= Bobby Womack discography =

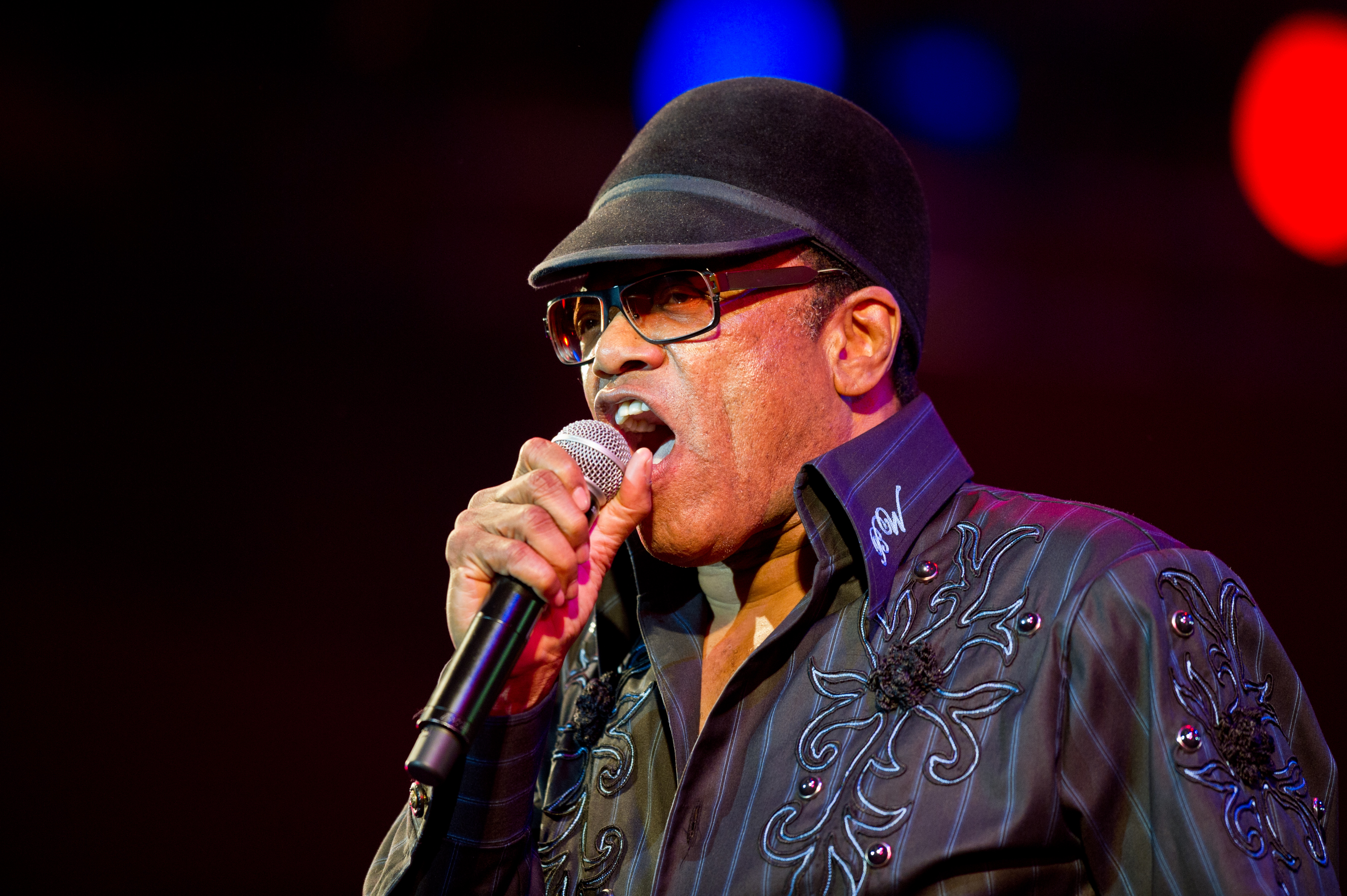
- Studio albums: 28
- Live albums: 3
- Compilation albums: 9
- Singles: 47

The discography of American recording artist Bobby Womack consists of 28 studio albums, 3 live albums, 9 compilation albums, and 47 singles.

== Albums ==
=== Studio albums ===
List of studio albums, with selected chart positions, sales figures, and certifications
Title	Album details	Peak chart positions			Sales	Certifications
Title	Album details	US	US R&B	UK	Sales	Certifications
Fly Me to the Moon	Released: January 1969; Label: Minit	174	34	—		
My Prescription	Released: February 1970; Label: Minit	—	44	—		
Communication	Released: September 15, 1971; Label: United Artists	83	7	—		
Understanding	Released: May 30, 1972; Label: United Artists	43	7	—		
Facts of Life	Released: June 8, 1973; Label: United Artists	37	6	—		
Lookin' for a Love Again	Released: January 11, 1974; Label: United Artists	85	5	—		
I Don't Know What the World Is Coming To	Released: March 28, 1975; Label: United Artists	126	20	—		
Safety Zone	Released: October 27, 1975; Label: United Artists	147	40	—		
BW Goes C&W	Released: 1976; Label: United Artists	—	—	—		
Home Is Where the Heart Is	Released: 1977; Label: Columbia	—	—	—		
Pieces	Released: 1978; Label: Columbia	—	—	—		
Roads of Life	Released: 1979; Label: Arista	—	55	—		
The Poet	Released: 1981; Label: Beverly Glen	29	1	—		
The Poet II	Released: 1984; Label: Beverly Glen	60	5	31		
So Many Rivers	Released: 1985; Label: MCA	66	5	28		
Someday We'll All Be Free	Released: 1985; Label: Beverly Glen	—	59	—		
Womagic	Released: 1986; Label: MCA	—	68	—		
The Last Soul Man	Released: 1987; Label: MCA	—	—	—		
Save the Children	Released: 1989; Label: SOLAR	—	—	—		
Resurrection	Released: August 16, 1994; Label: Continuum	—	91	87		
Back to My Roots	Released: August 24, 1999; Label: Capitol	—	—	—		
Traditions	Released: November 4, 1999; Label: Capitol	—	—	—		
Christmas Album	Released: 2000; Label: Indigo	—	—	—		
The Bravest Man in the Universe	Released: June 12, 2012; Label: XL	181	21	49		
"—" denotes releases that did not chart.

=== Live albums ===
List of studio albums, with selected chart positions, sales figures, and certifications
Title	Album details	Peak chart positions		Sales	Certifications
Title	Album details	US	US R&B	Sales	Certifications
Your Navy Presents Bobby Womack	Released: 1968; Label: United States Navy Recruitment	—	—		
The Womack "Live"	Released: 1970; Label: United Artists	188	13		
Soul Sensation Live	Released: 1998; Label: Sequel	—	—		
"—" denotes releases that did not chart.

=== Compilation albums ===
- 1975: Greatest Hits (United Artists) – US No. 142, R&B No. 30
- 1975: I Can Understand It (United Artists) – same tracks as on Greatest Hits
- 1986: Check it Out (Stateside SSL-6013)
- 1993: Midnight Mover: The Bobby Womack Collection (EMI USA)
- 1998: Red Hot + Rhapsody
- 1999: Traditions (The Right Stuff/Capitol/EMI)
- 2003: Lookin' For a Love: The Best of 1968–1976 (Stateside)
- 2004: Fly Me to the Moon/My Prescription (Stateside) 2 albums on one CD
- 2004: Understanding/Communication (Stateside)
- 2004: Womack Live/The Safety Zone (Stateside)
- 2004: Lookin' For A Love Again/B.W. Goes C&W (Stateside)
- 2004: Facts of Life/I Don't Know What the World Is Coming To (Stateside)
- 2013: Everything's Gonna Be Alright: The American Singles 1967-76 (Charly)
- 2014: Icon (Capitol/UMe)

== Singles ==
=== As lead artist ===
Year	Titles (A-side, B-side) Both sides from same album except where indicated	Peak chart positions			Certification	Title
Year	Titles (A-side, B-side) Both sides from same album except where indicated	US	US R&B	UK	Certification	Title
1965	"Nothing You Can Do" b/w "Get It While You Can"	—	—	—		Non-album tracks
1965	"I Found a True Love" b/w "A Lonesome Man"	—	—	—		Non-album tracks
1966	"What Is This" b/w "I Wonder"	—	—	—		Non-album tracks
1967	"Find Me Somebody" b/w "How Does It Feel"	—	—	—		Non-album tracks
1967	"Baby, I Can't Stand It" b/w "Trust Me"	—	—	—		Non-album tracks
1967	"Broadway Walk" b/w "Somebody Special" (from Fly Me to the Moon)	—	—	—		Non-album tracks
1968	"What Is This" b/w "What You Gonna Do (When Your Love Is Gone)" (Non-album track)	—	33	—		Fly Me to the Moon
1968	"Fly Me to the Moon" b/w "Take Me"	52	16	—		Fly Me to the Moon
1968	"California Dreamin'" b/w "Baby, You Oughta Think It Over"	43	20	—	BPI: Silver	Fly Me to the Moon
1969	"I Left My Heart in San Francisco" b/w "Love, the Time Is Now" (from Fly Me to the Moon)	—	48	—		My Prescription
1969	"It's Gonna Rain" b/w "Thank You"	—	43	—		My Prescription
1969	"How I Miss You Baby" b/w "Tried and Convicted"	93	14	—		My Prescription
1970	"More Than I Can Stand" b/w "Arkansas State Prison"	90	23	—		My Prescription
1970	"I'm Gonna Forget About You" b/w "Don't Look Back"	—	30	—		My Prescription
1970	"Everybody's Talkin'" b/w "Something"	—	—	—		The Womack "Live"
1971	"Breezin'" b/w "Azure Blue"; Both sides with Gábor Szabó	—	43	—		High Contrast (Gábor Szabó's album)
1971	"The Preacher"—Part 2 / "More Than I Can Stand" b/w Part 1	—	30	—		The Womack "Live"
1971	"Communication" b/w "Fire and Rain"	—	40	—		Communication
1972	"That's the Way I Feel About Cha" b/w "Come L'Amore"	27	2	—		Communication
1972	"Woman's Gotta Have It" b/w "(If You Don't Want My Love) Give It Back" (from Communication)	60	1	—		Understanding
1972	"Sweet Caroline (Good Times Never Seemed So Good)" /	51	16	—		Understanding
1973	"Harry Hippie"	31	8	—	US: Gold	Understanding
1973	"Across 110th Street" b/w "Hang On in There"	56	19	—	BPI: Silver	Across 110th Street
1973	"Nobody Wants You When You're Down and Out"	29	2	—		Facts of Life
1973	"I'm Through Trying to Prove My Love to You"	—	80	—		Facts of Life
1974	"Lookin' for a Love" (solo re-recording) b/w "Let It Hang Out"	10	1	—	US: Gold	Lookin' for a Love Again
1974	"You're Welcome, Stop On By" b/w "I Don't Want to Be Hurt by Ya Love Again"	59	5	—		Lookin' for a Love Again
1974	"I Don't Know" b/w "Yes Jesus Loves Me"	—	—	—		I Don't Know What the World Is Coming To
1975	"Check It Out" b/w "Interlude #2"	91	6	—		I Don't Know What the World Is Coming To
1975	"It's All Over Now" (with Bill Withers) b/w "Git It"	—	68	—		I Don't Know What the World Is Coming To
1975	"Where There's a Will, There's a Way" b/w "Everything's Gonna Be Alright"	—	13	—		Safety Zone
1976	"Daylight" b/w "Trust Me"	—	5	—		Safety Zone
1977	"Home Is Where the Heart Is" b/w "We've Only Just Begun"	—	43	—		Home Is Where the Heart Is
1977	"Standing in the Safety Zone" b/w "A Change Is Gonna Come"	—	—	—		Home Is Where the Heart Is
1978	"Wind It Up" b/w "Stop Before We Start"	—	—	—		Pieces
1978	"Trust Your Heart" b/w "When Love Begins Friendship Ends"	—	47	—		Pieces
1979	"How Could You Break My Heart" b/w "I Honestly Love You"	—	40	—		Roads of Life
1981	"Secrets" /	—	55	—		The Poet
1982	"If You Think You're Lonely Now"	—	3	—		The Poet
1982	"Where Do We Go from Here" b/w "Just My Imagination"	—	26	—		The Poet
1984	"It Takes a Lot of Strength to Say Goodbye" (with Patti LaBelle) b/w "Who's Foolin' Who"	—	76	—		The Poet II
1984	"Love Has Finally Come at Last" (with Patti LaBelle) b/w "American Dream"	88	3	—		The Poet II
1984	"Tell Me Why" b/w "Through the Eyes of a Child" (with Patti LaBelle)	—	54	60		The Poet II
1985	"Someday We'll All Be Free" b/w "I Wish I Had Someone to Go Home To"	—	74	—		Someday We'll All Be Free
1985	"I Wish He Didn't Trust Me So Much" b/w "Got to Be with You Tonight"	—	2	64		So Many Rivers
1985	"Let Me Kiss It Where It Hurts" b/w "Check It Out"	—	50	—		So Many Rivers
1985	"I'm So Proud" (with Cecil Womack) b/w "Searching for My Love"	—	—	—		Someday We'll All Be Free
1986	"Gypsy Woman" b/w "Whatever Happened to the Times?"	—	—	—		So Many Rivers
1986	"(I Wanna) Make Love to You" b/w "Whatever Happened to the Times?" (from So Many Rivers)	—	57	100		Womagic
1987	"How Could You Break My Heart" b/w "Give It Up"; UK-only release	—	—	86		Roads of Life
1987	"So the Story Goes" b/w "The Liam McCoy"; Both sides with Living in a Box	81	—	34		Non-album tracks
1987	"Living in a Box" b/w "I Can't Stay Mad" (from Womagic)	—	—	70		The Last Soul Man
1988	"Outside Myself" b/w "A Woman Likes to Hear That"	—	—	—		The Last Soul Man
1989	"Priorities" b/w Instrumental version of B-side	—	—	—		Save the Children
1989	"Save the Children" b/w Instrumental version of A-side	—	83	—		Save the Children
1991	"I Wish I'd Never Met You" (with Mica Paris); Featured on "If I Love U 2 Nite" CD single by Mica Paris	—	—	—		Non-album tracks
1993	"I'm Back for More" (with Lulu); CD single with four different mixes	—	—	27		Non-album tracks
1995	"It's a Man's Man's Man's World" (with Jeanie Tracy); CD single with seven different mixes	—	—	73		Non-album tracks
2004	"California Dreamin'" (re-release); 2. "Lookin' for a Love"; 3. "Holding On to My Baby's Love" (Non-album track); CD single	—	—	59		The Preacher
2012	"Please Forgive My Heart"; CD single with two different mixes	—	—	—		The Bravest Man in the Universe
"–" denotes releases that did not chart.

=== As featured artist ===
Year	Title	Peak chart positions										
Year	Title	US Pop	US R&B	AUS	AUT	BEL	GER	IRL	NLD	NZ	SWI	US
1962	"Lookin' for a Love" (The Valentinos featuring Bobby Womack)	72	8	—	—	—	—	—	—	—	—	—
1964	"It's All Over Now" (The Valentinos featuring Bobby Womack)	94	21	—	—	—	—	—	—	—	—	—
1985	"(No Matter How High I Get) I'll Still Be Looking Up to You" (Wilton Felder featuring Bobby Womack and Altrinna Grayson)	102	2	—	—	—	—	—	—	—	—	—
2010	"Stylo" (Gorillaz featuring Mos Def & Bobby Womack)	—	—	48	40	25	63	—	56	—	56	103
"—" denotes releases that did not chart.

== Other appearances (non-comprehensive) ==
Year	Song	Other artists	Album
1976	"Adagio"	Michael Quatro	Dancers, Romancers, Dreamers & Schemers
2001	"Get a Life"	Rae & Christian	Sleepwalking
2001	"Wake Up Everybody"	Rae & Christian	Sleepwalking
2010	"Cloud of Unknowing"	Gorillaz & Sinfonia ViVA	Plastic Beach
2011	"Bobby in Phoenix"	Gorillaz	The Fall
2015	"New Day Coming"	Rudimental	We the Generation
2026	"The Moon Cave"	Gorillaz, Asha Puthli, Dave Jolicoeur, Jalen Ngonda & Black Thought	The Mountain
