= Harry Womack =

American musical artist (1945–1974)

- Born: Harris Womack; June 25, 1945; Cleveland, Ohio, US
- Died: March 9, 1974 (aged 28) Los Angeles
- Genres: Gospel, rhythm and blues, soul, rock and roll, doo-wop
- Occupations: Singer, musician, instrumentalist
- Instruments: Vocals, bass
- Years active: 1962–1974
- Labels: Pennant, SAR, Chess, Jubilee, Clean
- Formerly of: The Valentinos

Harris "Harry" Womack (June 25, 1945 – March 9, 1974) was an American singer and musician, most notable for his tenure as a member of the family R&B quintet The Valentinos.

== Biography ==
=== Early life ===
Harris "Harry" Womack grew up the fourth of five sons to Friendly and Naomi Womack in Cleveland's east side. The brothers were very close and attached nicknames to one another— Harry's was "Goat.” Raised as Baptist, all five brothers began singing together when Harry was seven, forming The Womack Brothers. Like his brothers Bobby (1944–2014) and Cecil (1947–2013), Harry took up instruments, playing bass guitar before reaching his teenage years. Along with brothers Cecil and Curtis, Harry was a tenor vocalist while Bobby and Friendly, Jr. were baritones. In 1960, when he was 15, Sam Cooke signed the act to his SAR Records label, having told the brothers – and their father – that he was willing to work with them. Friendly Womack made Cooke promise that the brothers would continue to sing gospel and not what he referred to as "the devil's music".

=== Career ===
Following two gospel releases with SAR, Sam Cooke suggested the group change their sound and name. In 1962, he renamed them The Valentinos and produced and arranged the group's first major hit, "Looking for a Love", which was led by Bobby. The record became a hit and landed them an opening spot on James Brown's Revue. Following several modestly successful R&B releases, the Valentinos' next hit, "It's All Over Now", was released in 1964. While successful on the R&B chart, the song became internationally successful after The Rolling Stones covered it, and it has been covered by several bands hence.

Following Cooke's death in December 1964, SAR folded. Bobby Womack married Cooke's widow, Barbara, and left the group for a solo career. The Valentinos briefly disbanded before regrouping as a quartet in 1966, signing with Chess Records where they recorded the Northern soul hit, "Sweeter than the Day Before". However, Chess dropped the group after only two singles, and Cecil Womack followed Bobby out of the group after he married Mary Wells. In 1968, the remaining trio of Harry, Curtis and Friendly Jr. signed with Jubilee Records where they recorded the Cecil-composed "Two Lovers History" before being dropped in 1970.

In 1970, Harry started playing bass with Bobby, who had begun a successful solo career after several years in limbo due to the scandal surrounding his marriage to Barbara Cooke. He played on Bobby's album The Womack "Live", as well as contributing background vocals – along with the other Valentinos and Cecil Womack – to his solo records, starting with the 1970 release My Prescription.

Harry and the brothers featured in the background of Bobby's breakthrough hit, "That's the Way I Feel About Cha", as well as "Woman's Gotta Have It", both in 1972. In late 1973, they backed Bobby again on a remake of "Lookin' for a Love". Prior to that, the Valentinos emerged with a minor R&B hit of Bobby's "I Can Understand It", its success landing them a performing spot on the hit dance show, Soul Train.

In 1972 Bobby released the album Understanding. The album reached No. 43 on the Billboard pop albums chart and No. 7 on the R&B albums chart. One of the key songs from the album, "I Can Understand It", has become a soul classic, and Bobby later produced a cover version of it for The Valentinos.

Although it was assumed that Bobby's 1973 hit, "Harry Hippie", was about Harry, Bobby later said that the song was given to him by his collaborator and friend, country singer-songwriter Jim Ford. Nonetheless, Harry would dance during performances of the song, amusing the audience and Bobby. Harry's last professional recording was singing background (tenor) on Bobby's 1974 album Lookin' for a Love Again. The title track found success for a third time after its release.

Bobby described his brother as "bohemian" and "carefree". Harry had a confident stage presence and the ability to improvise in gigs. He was known to be soft-spoken, laid back and reflective, with a quick wit. He was quite reclusive, choosing to spend time with his friends.

=== Death ===
In March 1974, Bobby had noted a continuing escalation of relational problems between Harry and his girlfriend, Patricia, and suggested that instead of touring, Harry stay at his home while the rest of the band went on tour. On the night of March 9, shortly after arriving at Bobby's house, Patricia started an argument with Harry, claiming she had found a pair of panties in Bobby's room. She stabbed Harry fatally in the neck with a steak knife. The death left her 7-year-old son (from a previous relationship) who Harry cared for, and their 3-year-old daughter, fatherless. The undergarments later turned out to belong to a girlfriend of Bobby's. Harry is buried at Forest Lawn Memorial Park, Glendale.

A week after his death, his final recording on "Lookin' for a Love" reached number 1 on the R&B chart and number 10 on the pop chart, later selling two million copies.

Bobby performed "Harry Hippie" in tribute to Harry, for over four decades, until his death in 2014.
