= Better Love =

Better Love or A Better Love may refer to:

- "Better Love" (Katerine Duska song), 2019 song that represented Greece in the Eurovision Song Contest 2019
- "Better Love", song by Foxes from All I Need (Foxes album)
- "Better Love", song by Hozier from The Legend of Tarzan (film)
- "Better Love (Everybody's Looking for a Better Love)", song by Bobby Womack from Save the Children (album)
- "A Better Love", Top 20 hit by Londonbeat 1991
