= Communication (Bobby Womack album) =

Studio album by Bobby Womack
- Released: September 15, 1971
- Recorded: 1971
- Studio: United Artists, Los Angeles
- Genre: Soul, funk
- Length: 35:48
- Label: United Artists
- Producer: Bobby Womack

Bobby Womack chronology
My Prescription (1970)	Communication (1971)	Understanding (1972)

Singles from Communication
- 1. "That's the Way I Feel About Cha" Released: November 17, 1971

Professional ratings
Review scores
Source	Rating
AllMusic	4/5 stars
The Encyclopedia of Popular Music	3/5 stars

Communication is the third studio album by American musician Bobby Womack. The album was released on September 15, 1971, by United Artists Records. It reached No. 5 on the Billboard R&B chart and No. 20 on the Billboard Jazz Chart in 1972. It included the hit single, "That's The Way I Feel About Cha", which charted at No. 2 on the Billboard R&B Singles chart and No. 27 on the Billboard pop chart. The album became Womack's breakthrough spawning the hit single "That's The Way I Feel About Cha" and a favorite Womack album track, "(If You Don't Want My Love) Give It Back", which Womack recorded three times after the original, the first remake, a slower acoustic version, was issued on the soundtrack of the film, Across 110th Street, and an instrumental by J. J. Johnson's band. The fourth time Womack recorded it was with Rolling Stones singer and musician Ron Wood. Womack recorded his own versions of James Taylor's "Fire and Rain", Ray Stevens' "Everything Is Beautiful" and featured a spoken word monologue in his cover of the Burt Bacharach and Hal David standard, "(They Long To Be) Close to You".

Actress Pam Grier and veteran singers Janice Singleton and Patrice Holloway sung background on the songs "Come l'Amore", "Give It Back" and "Yield Not to Temptation", a song Womack and his brothers, the Womack Brothers (later the Valentinos), recorded over a decade before with Bobby's older brother Curtis singing lead. Ironically, Bobby's brothers sing background with him on the remaining tracks. The album's instrumental background was provided by the legendary Muscle Shoals team. The track "Come l'Amore" was "covered" by James Brown in his Lyn Collins duet single, "What My Baby Needs Now (Is a Little More Loving)" though the lyrics are different and in different keys.

== Track listing ==
No.	Title	Writer(s)	Length
1.	"Communication"	Bobby Womack	4:30
2.	"Come l'Amore"	Bob Hilliard, Leon Ware	3:00
3.	"Fire and Rain"	James Taylor	4:30
4.	"(If You Don't Want My Love) Give It Back"	Bobby Womack	2:50
5.	"Medley: Monologue / (They Long to Be) Close to You"	Burt Bacharach, Hal David	9:30
6.	"Everything is Beautiful"	Ray Stevens	2:55
7.	"That's The Way I Feel About Cha"	Jimmy Grisby, Joe Hicks, Bobby Womack	5:03
8.	"Yield Not to Temptation"		3:02

== Personnel ==
- Bobby Womack – vocals, guitar, organ, string and horn arrangements
- Barry Beckett – piano, clavichord, harpsichord, electric piano, Moog synthesizer
- Tippy Armstrong, Jimmy Johnson – guitar
- Roger Hawkins – drums, percussion
- David Hood – bass
- Clayton Ivey, Truman Thomas – keyboards
- Harrison Calloway – trumpet
- Dale Quillen – trombone
- Ronnie Eades – baritone saxophone
- Harvey Thompson – tenor saxophone
- Friendly Womack, Jr., Curtis Womack, Harry Womack, Cecil Womack, Patrice Holloway, Pam Grier, Janice Singleton – backing vocals
- René Hall − string arrangements

Technical

- John Van Hamersveld − art direction
- Norman Seeff − photography

== Charts ==
Chart (1972)	Peak position
Billboard Pop Albums	83
Billboard Top Soul Albums	7
Billboard Top Jazz Albums	20

=== Singles ===
Year	Single	Chart positions	
Year	Single	US	US R&B
1971	"Communication"	-	40
1972	"That's The Way I Feel About 'Cha"	27	2
