= The Ride (Los Lobos album) =

Studio album by Los Lobos
- Released: May 4, 2004
- Studios: CRG (Rowland Heights); The Village (West Los Angeles; Big Stink (Hercules; Oslo Concert Hall (Oslo); Sputnik Sound (Nashville); CRC (Chicago)
- Genres: Chicano rock Roots rock Tex-Mex
- Length: 68:08
- Label: Hollywood/Mammoth
- Producer: Los Lobos

Los Lobos chronology
| Good Morning Aztlán (2002) | The Ride (2004) | Ride This - The Covers EP (2004) |

Professional ratings
Aggregate scores
| Source | Rating |
|---|---|
| Metacritic | 82/100 |
Review scores
| Source | Rating |
| AllMusic | 4/5 stars |
| Blender | 4/5 stars |
| Christgau’s Consumer Guide | (2-star Honorable Mention) |
| E! | B |
| Entertainment Weekly | A− |
| Q | 4/5 stars |
| Mojo | 4/5 stars |
| Now | 4/5 stars |
| Rolling Stone | 3/5 stars |
| Rolling Stone Album Guide | 4/5 stars |
| Tom Hull | B+ |

The Ride is a studio album by Los Lobos. It was released on May 4, 2004, by Hollywood / Mammoth Records. It features numerous guest musicians, including Bobby Womack, Tom Waits, Rubén Blades, Dave Alvin, Richard Thompson, Elvis Costello, Mavis Staples, and Garth Hudson. The album contains new material and also new versions of earlier Los Lobos songs.

== Track listing ==
| No. | Title | Writer(s) | Length |
|---|---|---|---|
| 1. | "La Venganza de Los Pelados" (featuring Café Tacuba) | David Hidalgo, Louie Pérez, Luís Torres | 4:51 |
| 2. | "Rita" | Hidalgo, Pérez | 5:20 |
| 3. | "Is This All There Is?" (featuring Little Willy G.) | Hidalgo, Pérez | 4:43 |
| 4. | "Charmed" | Hidalgo, Pérez | 5:00 |
| 5. | "Somewhere in Time" (featuring Dave Alvin) | Hidalgo, Pérez, Dave Alvin | 4:15 |
| 6. | "Wicked Rain" / "Across 110th Street" (featuring Bobby Womack) | Cesar Rosas / Bobby Womack, J. J. Johnson | 8:14 |
| 7. | "Kitate" (featuring Tom Waits and Martha Gonzalez) | Hidalgo, Pérez, Tom Waits | 3:29 |
| 8. | "Hurry Tomorrow" | Rosas, Robert Hunter | 4:33 |
| 9. | "Ya Se Va" (featuring Rubén Blades) | Hidalgo, Rosas, Rubén Blades | 4:54 |
| 10. | "Wreck of the Carlos Rey" (featuring Richard Thompson) | Hidalgo, Pérez | 5:58 |
| 11. | "A Matter of Time" (featuring Elvis Costello) | Hidalgo, Pérez | 2:55 |
| 12. | "Someday" (featuring Mavis Staples) | Hidalgo, Pérez | 4:39 |
| 13. | "Chains of Love" | Hidalgo, Pérez | 5:47 |

Hidden track
| No. | Title | Length |
|---|---|---|
| 14. | "Phone Call from Rita" | 0:31 |

Japanese bonus tracks
| No. | Title | Writer(s) | Length |
|---|---|---|---|
| 14. | "Monstra’s Out" |
| 15. | "Jockey Full of Bourbon" | Tom Waits |

== Personnel ==
The specific contributions of the members of Los Lobos are not mentionedon the album, but this is the usual:

- David Hidalgo – vocals, guitar, accordion, fiddle, requinto jarocho
- Louie Pérez – vocals, guitar, drums, jarana
- Cesar Rosas – vocals, guitar, bajo sexto
- Conrad Lozano – vocals, bass, guitarron
- Steve Berlin – keyboards, woodwinds

Additional musicians

Credits adapted from the album's liner notes.

- Cougar Estrada – drums, percussion on all tracks
- Victor Bisetti – additional percussion
- Little Willy G. – vocals (3)
- Dave Alvin – vocals (5)
- Bobby Womack – vocals (6)
- Tom Waits – vocals (7)
- Martha Gonzalez – vocals (7)
- Rubén Blades – vocals (9)
- Richard Thompson – vocals (10)
- Elvis Costello – vocals (11)
- Mavis Staples – vocals (12)
- Elfego Buendia – vocals (1)
- Alejandro Flores – quinta guapanguera, requinto (1)
- Emmanuel de Real – jarana, keyboards (1)
- Joselo Rangel – guitar (1)
- Garth Hudson – keyboards (1, 11, 13)
- Mitchell Froom - keyboards (2)
- Greg Leisz - pedal steel guitar (2, 5, 11)
- Rev. Charles Williams - piano (6), organ (6), clavinet (12)
- Francisco Torres - trombone (7)
- Alberto Salas - piano (9)
- Lonnie Jordan - organ (12)

Production

- Los Lobos – producer
- Robert Carranza – engineer, mixing
- Seth McLain – engineer
- Jeff Hooper – engineer
- Tom Waits – engineer
- Joe Ross – engineer
- Mat Lejeune – engineer
- Emmanuel de Real – engineer
- Luis Román – engineer
- Chris Holmes – mixing assistant
- Robert Hadley – mastering
- Louie Perez – art direction
- Al Quattrocchi – art direction
- Jeff Smith – art direction
- Tornado Design – design, photography
- Max Aguilera-Hellweg – photography

== Charts ==
| Chart (2004) | Peak position |
|---|---|
| Belgian Albums (Ultratop Flanders) | 74 |
| Italian Albums (FIMI) | 45 |
| Norwegian Albums (VG-lista) | 34 |
| Swedish Albums (Sverigetopplistan) | 46 |
| US Billboard 200 | 75 |
