= Across 110th Street =

1972 film by Barry Shear

- Theatrical poster
- Directed by: Barry Shear
- Screenplay by: Luther Davis
- Story by: Barry Shear
- Based on: Across 110th 1970 novel by Wally Ferris
- Produced by: Anthony Quinn; Fouad Said; Barry Shear
- Starring: Anthony Quinn; Yaphet Kotto; Anthony Franciosa
- Cinematography: Jack Priestley
- Edited by: Byron Brandt; Carl Pingitore
- Music by: Bobby Womack; J. J. Johnson
- Production company: Film Guarantors
- Distributed by: United Artists
- Release date: December 19, 1972
- Running time: 102 minutes
- Country: United States
- Language: English
- Box office: $10 million

Across 110th Street is a 1972 American neo-noir action thriller film (Note: The film contains elements of blaxploitation films and is sometimes grouped along with them, but there is disagreement about whether the term applies.) directed by Barry Shear and starring Yaphet Kotto, Anthony Quinn, Anthony Franciosa and Paul Benjamin. Adapted from the novel Across 110th by Wally Ferris, the film is set in Harlem, New York and takes its name from 110th Street, the traditional dividing line between Harlem and Central Park that functioned as an informal boundary of race and class in 1970s New York City. The film received negative critical reviews upon release for its violent content and perceived unoriginality, though modern critical and academic assessment of the film has been more positive. The film was the first to use an Arriflex 35BL camera, which enabled the extensive on-location shooting desired by Shear.

== Plot ==
Ex-convict Jim Harris and his two accomplices attempt to rob a Harlem count house for the Mafia run by local black gangsters. The heist goes awry and Harris murders both the black gangsters and the white mobsters before fleeing and murdering two policemen as they escape. Word of the robbery reaches Don Gennarro, whose family holds territory in Harlem. Afraid that they will lose ground to the black gangsters, he sends his son-in-law and enforcer Nick to deal with the problem. Back in Harlem, Captain Frank Mattelli arrives at the scene and learns no one is willing to talk out of Omertà, distrust of police, bribery, or a combination of the three. Mattelli is a veteran of the Harlem area and prides himself on knowing it, but is prejudiced against blacks and violent with suspects. He meets the black Lt. Pope, a relatively inexperienced investigator, who informs Mattelli that he has been assigned the case. Mattelli protests before a superior pulls him and aside and informs him that Pope is leading the case for political reasons. Nick pays a visit to "Doc" Johnson, the head of the black mob in Harlem, to confront him over the lack of security during the robbery and declare his intentions to capture and torture the robbers. The two trade insults and Johnson tells Nick that it is unwise for Italians to come up to Harlem to murder black men. Johnson's henchman, Shevvy, makes rounds in the black community to solicit information from Jim's girlfriend Gloria (it is revealed later in the film that Jim formerly worked for Doc Johnson) and bribe bystanders into silence. Gloria confronts Jim about the money and demands he give it back, but Jim snaps at her that he is an ex-con with no education and that he would only be able to perform menial, servile jobs.

The police find the getaway car ditched in the river, and Shevvy bribes another policeman to receive the information. The police arrest the former owner of the car, who reveals that he sold it the previous week. Mattelli berates the man, calling him a junkie and beating him before Pope intervenes and the two argue about Mattelli's methods and racist behavior. Shevvy, Nick, and his men visit the man's wife and pressure her into revealing to whom they sold the car. They later find the driver, Henry J. at a club, where he has been openly spending the money. Nick breaks a glass in Henry J's face, beats him, and abducts him. Henry J later dies in the ambulance en route to the hospital, and it is later revealed that he was also crucified and castrated during his torture. Mattelli visits Doc Johnson and implores him to stop the violence, but Johnson feigns ignorance and blames the Italians. Affronted that Mattelli is ordering him around, Doc orders Shevvy to throw him out of his office, but Pope intervenes, learning that Mattelli is on the take from Doc Johnson. Doc attempts to bribe Pope, but Pope refuses his money. The men visit Henry J's estranged wife, where they learn that the two never legally married. Mattelli is prepared to tell her about the true nature of her husband's death, but Pope lies and says that he died in a hit-and-run. After getting Jim's name from Mrs. Jackson, Mattelli hands her a wad of cash on the way out.

Shevvy and his thugs torture the owner of the laundry where Jim's accomplice Joe works for information regarding his location. Joe takes his cut of the heist from Jim and prepares to leave town, but gets in a cab driven by one of Shevvy's men. When the cabbie drives him into an ambush, Joe manages to drive away while shooting one of the thugs. Jim relocates to an abandoned tenement where he used to live in order to hide from his pursuers. Joe flees into a construction site, where Nick launches into a racist tirade against him, torturing him into revealing Jim's name before dropping him off the side of the building. Shevvy and his henchmen look visibly disturbed during the torture. Jim has an epilepsy flareup and requires his medicine, which makes Gloria inadvertently lead his pursuers to his hideout. Doc phones and informs Pope where Harris is hiding. While Jim and Gloria daydream about their future plans, Nick and his henchmen arrive at the tenement and exchange gunfire. In the initial shootout, Gloria and one of Nick's henchmen are killed. Jim then murders Nick before chasing a fleeing henchman into the street and gunning down both him and the getaway driver. The police chase Jim onto the roof where he guns down multiple pursuing policemen. After being mortally wounded by multiple police snipers, Jim throws his bag of money to a group of school children below. Mattelli attempts to apprehend Jim, but stumbles and drops his gun. He is almost killed by Jim but is saved by Pope, who delivers the killing blow. While Pope holsters his weapon, Shevvy shoots Mattelli in the head with a silenced pistol from an adjacent rooftop, and he collapses to the ground while holding Pope's hand.

== Cast ==
- Anthony Quinn as Captain Frank Mattelli
- Yaphet Kotto as Lieutenant William Pope
- Anthony Franciosa as Nick D'Salvio
- Paul Benjamin as Jim Harris
- Ed Bernard as Joe Logart
- Richard Ward as "Doc" Johnson
- Antonio Fargas as Henry J. Jackson
- Norma Donaldson as Gloria Roberts
- Gilbert Lewis as Shevvy
- Marlene Warfield as Mrs. Jackson
- Nat Polen as Lieutenant Reilly
- Tim O'Connor as Lieutenant Hartnett
- Gloria Hendry as Laurelene
- Burt Young as Lapides
- Charles McGregor as Chink
- Paul Harris as "Mr. C."
- Janet Sarno as Teresa D'Salvio
- Robert Sacchi as Jerry
- Arnold Williams as Glenn Fears
- Frank Macetta as Don Gennarro
- Ric Mancini as Police Detective

== Production ==
Anthony Quinn, who also served as executive producer, originally wanted John Wayne and then Kirk Douglas for the lead role of Captain Mattelli. Both passed, as did Burt Lancaster, leaving Quinn to take the part. Additionally, he hoped to get Sidney Poitier to play Lt. Pope. Upon hearing the news, Harlem residents disagreed with the choice, claiming Poitier was too Hollywood and not urban enough for the role. Quinn relented, and Yaphet Kotto was chosen to play Pope.

In keeping with the film's themes, Shear insisted on filming in real New York locations, despite the warnings of Hollywood colleagues regarding labor costs, permits and the supposed dangers of Harlem. Shear employed Fouad Said as a co-producer, who had extensive experience in location shooting, starting with the TV series I Spy. The series had pioneered the mixture of studio and location footage, largely due to eschewing the use of Mitchell cameras for the new Arriflex 35 IIC. For Across 110th Street, Said persuaded Volker Bahnemann, Vice President of the U.S. ARRI division, to allow his crew to use the then-new Arriflex 35BL camera for one week, marking its first use for a feature film. The camera was self-blimped and ideal for handheld shooting, due to its flexibility and quietness. Cinematographer Jack Priestley said it was tremendously helpful, particularly in small rooms and confined quarters, and predicted it would revolutionize the film industry. Said was ultimately able to keep the camera for another four weeks, with 95% of the movie filmed at 60 different interior and exterior locations in Harlem. Camera operator Sol Negrin said that its use also eliminated the need for post-production dubbing.

== Release ==
The film earned an estimated $3.4 million in North American rentals in 1973.

- In 1973 it was banned by the South African Publications Control Board.
- In 1984 it was released on VHS by Key Video, one of CBS/Fox's home video lines.
- In 2001 it was released on DVD.
- In 2010 it was digitized in High Definition (1080i) and broadcast on MGM HD.
- In September 2014 it was released on Blu-ray by Kino Lorber.
- In May 2025, it was released on 4K Ultra HD Blu-ray by Shout! Studios as a part of their Blaxploitation Classics Vol. 1 set.

== Reception ==
Among contemporary reviews, Roger Greenspun of The New York Times wrote "It manages at once to be unfair to blacks, vicious towards whites and insulting to anyone who feels that race relations might consist of something better than improvised genocide ... By the time it is over virtually everybody has been killed—by various means, but mostly by a machine gun that makes lots of noise and splatters lots of blood and probably serves as the nearest substitute for an identifiable hero." Variety wrote that the film "is not for the squeamish. From the beginning it is a virtual blood bath. Those portions of it which aren't bloody violent are filled in by the squalid location sites in New York's Harlem or equally unappealing ghetto areas leaving no relief from depression and oppression. There's not even a glamorous or romantic type character or angle for audiences to fantasy-empathize with."

Gene Siskel gave the film one-and-a-half stars out of four and wrote "The film breaks no new ground, remaining content to combine familiar elements from 'In the Heat of the Night' (modern black cop vs. traditional white cop) and at least a half-dozen urban melodramas in which Italians and blacks go at each other with guns and mouths blazing." Gary Arnold of The Washington Post slammed the film as "a crime melodrama at once so tacky and so brutal that one feels tempted to swear out a warrant for the arrest of the filmmakers." Kevin Thomas of the Los Angeles Times wrote that the film "self-destructs by consistently selling out to stomach-churning displays of unrelieved violence... that the grisliness depicted so graphically in 'Across 110th Street' is true to life is undisputable; it's the manner and extent of its depiction on the screen that's deplorable."

In 1973, veteran black Chicago journalist Lu Palmer opened his alternative newspaper Black X-Press Info Paper with a review of Across 110th Street. He reflected that the film was particularly thoughtful and well-acted compared to many other low-budget blaxploitation pictures of the era and noted that "this flick ought to be carefully studied — again, for its images and messages."

Across 110th Street presently holds a score of 85% at Rotten Tomatoes, based on 20 reviews.

== Soundtrack ==
Across 110th Street Soundtrack

Soundtrack album by Bobby Womack and J. J. Johnson
- Released: December 1972
- Recorded: 1972
- Genre: R&B
- Length: 30:13
- Label: United Artists
- Producer: Bobby Womack

Bobby Womack and J. J. Johnson chronology
Understanding (1972)	Across 110th Street Soundtrack (1972)	Facts of Life (1973)

Singles from Across 110th Street
- 1. "Across 110th Street" Released: February 8, 1973

The songs were written and performed by Bobby Womack, while the score was composed and conducted by J. J. Johnson. The album is predominantly soul music with funk and rock influences, with Johnson's score adding elements of jazz.

The title song reached No. 19 on the Billboard Hot Soul Singles chart and No. 56 on the Hot 100 in 1973 and was later featured in Quentin Tarantino's Jackie Brown (1997) and Ridley Scott's American Gangster (2007). Its lyrics reflect the broader themes of impoverishment and desperation in the film, where characters feel beaten down by poverty and must do whatever it takes to stay alive. Richie Unterberger of AllMusic likened the song, particularly its "attitude", to Curtis Mayfield's "Superfly".

The version of the song appearing in the film differs from the hit album and single version.

=== Track listing ===
All songs written by Bobby Womack, except where noted.

Side one

1. "Across 110th Street" (Bobby Womack, J.J. Johnson) – 3:45
2. "Harlem Clavinette (Instrumental)" (Johnson) – 2:12
3. "If You Don't Want My Love" – 2:27
4. "Hang On in There (Instrumental)" – 2:45
5. "Quicksand" – 1:37
6. "Harlem Love Theme (Instrumental)" (Johnson) – 3:07

Side two

1. "Across 110th Street (Instrumental)" (Womack, Johnson) – 2:26
2. "Do It Right" – 2:59
3. "Hang On in There" – 2:23
4. "If You Don't Want My Love (Instrumental)" – 3:03
5. "Across 110th Street – Part II" (Womack, Johnson) – 2:52
- Tracks 1, 3, 5, 8, 9 and 11 performed by Bobby Womack and Peace.
- Tracks 2, 4, 6, 7 and 10 performed by J. J. Johnson and his Orchestra.

=== Personnel ===
- Unidentified orchestra including
  - Carol Kaye – electric bass
  - Emil Richards – percussion
