= I Can Understand It =

"I Can Understand It" is a soul classic written and originally recorded by rhythm and blues musician Bobby Womack, who originally recorded the song for his top ten album, Understanding, released in late 1972. The Womack version was done in a more blues style.

== New Birth recording ==
In 1973, New Birth recorded a James Brown-esque style recording of the song with lead singer Leslie Wilson, who sounded like Womack, was vocally influenced by Sam Cooke. Their fast-paced version peaked at number four on the R&B charts and number thirty-five on the Hot 100. The New Birth version is the better-known version and has garnered praise.

== Other versions ==
- Bobby Womack's brothers, The Valentinos, also recorded the song. Their version was released as a single, and became a chart hit.
- In 1975 Columbia records released a third version of this classic track. The least known of the three, this version by Kokomo, a British-soul group, includes delicately mixed congas with a tempo similar to New Birth's and is perhaps, musically, the funkiest of the three. This version peaked at #13 on the US Disco File Top 20 chart. Lead singer Tony O'Malley's vocal style is reminiscent of [Dr. John]'s. The background harmonies and ad-libs make this an outstanding track.
