= Across 110th Street (song) =

Single by Bobby Womack & Peace

from the album Across 110th Street
- B-side: "Hang On In There"
- Released: February 1973
- Length: 3:45
- Label: United Artists UA-XW196-W
- Songwriters: Bobby Womack, J.J. Johnson
- Producer: Bobby Womack

Bobby Womack & Peace singles chronology
| "Harry Hippie" (1972) | "Across 110th Street" (1973) | "Nobody Wants You When You're Down and Out" (1973) |

"Across 110th Street" is a single by Bobby Womack, from the soundtrack and film of the same name that starred Anthony Quinn and Yaphet Kotto. It was released in 1973.

== Background ==
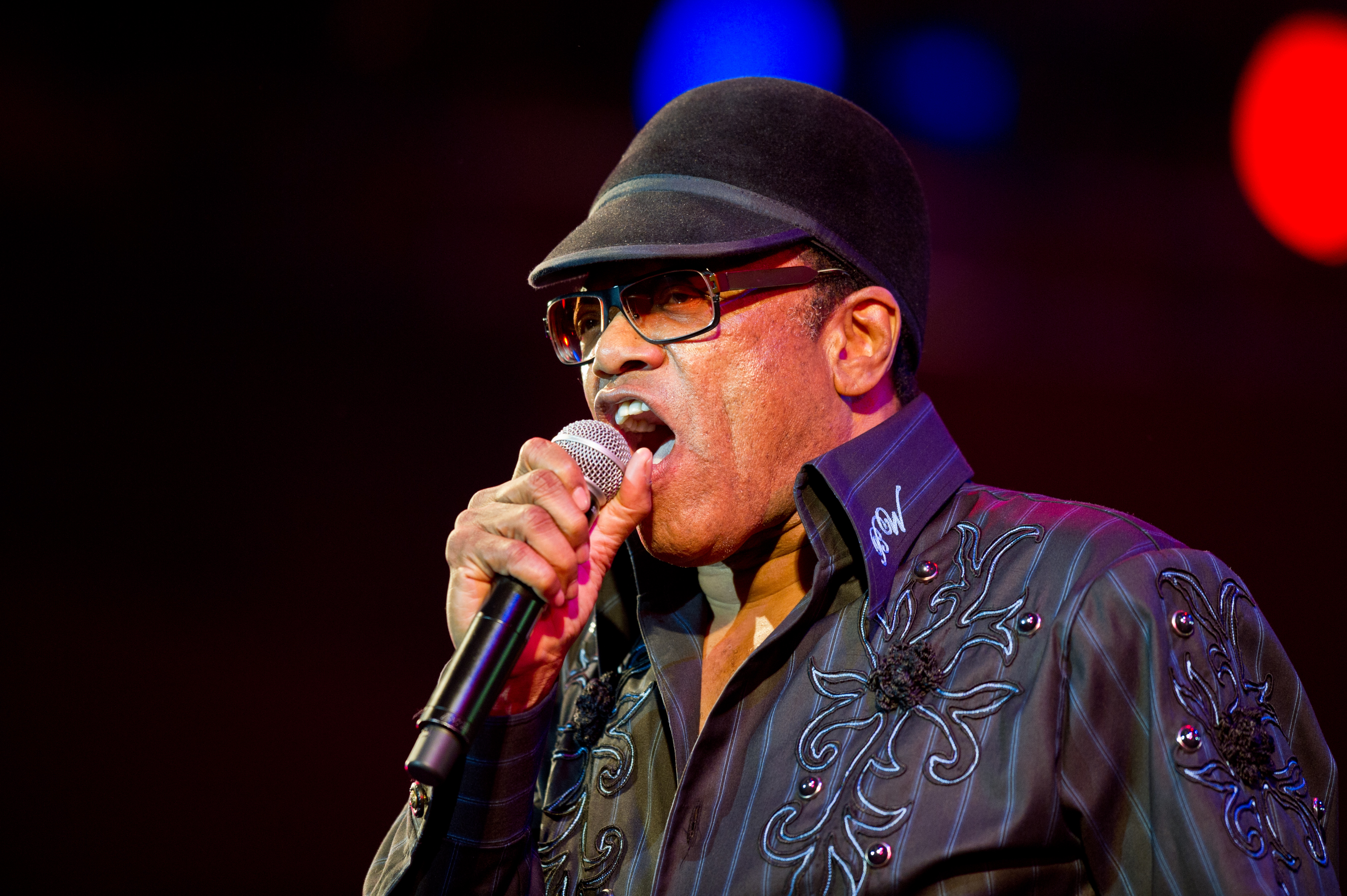
Bobby Womack at Roskilde Festival 2010

The single was released in February 1973 on the United Artists label. Credited to Bobby Womack and Peace, who had a hit previously with "Harry Hippie", it was composed by B. Womack and J. J. Johnson. Its B-side was "Hang On In There", composed by B. Womack. The March 31 issue of Billboard reported that it was his fourth hit in a year. For the week ending May 5, 1973 with the single in its sixth week in the charts, the Billboard best selling soul singles chart showed the single was at position 24 with the previous week's position being 19. Meanwhile, the chart showed the album in its 14th week, maintaining its position at 15.

== Personnel ==
- Unidentified orchestra including
  - Carol Kaye – electric bass
  - Emil Richards – percussion

== Certifications ==
| Region | Certification | Certified units/sales |
|---|---|---|
| United Kingdom (BPI) | Silver | 200,000^{‡} |
^{‡} Sales+streaming figures based on certification alone.

== Chart performance ==
| Chart (1973) | Peak position |
|---|---|
| US Billboard Hot 100 | 56 |
| US Billboard Best Selling Soul Singles | 19 |

== Single releases ==
- Bobby Womack & Peace - "Across 110th Street" / "Hang On In There" - United Artists XW 196 - 1973

== Other versions ==
- It is covered by Calvin Richardson on his 2009 album Facts of Life – The Soul of Bobby Womack and by Ania Dąbrowska on her Ania Movie (October 2015). A version featuring Bobby Womack appears on the Los Lobos album The Ride in a medley with the song "Wicked Rain".

== Popular culture ==
- The song was given a revival when it was prominently featured in Quentin Tarantino's 1997 film Jackie Brown. It was also featured in Ridley Scott's 2007 film American Gangster. 50 Cent told NME that 110th Street was the first song with which "he fell in love...because of how the situation was for black people in America at that time, there were a lot of struggle songs around. It seemed to be something that really moved the people around me. I felt the power of music to raise people up; to make them angry or proud."
