= So Many Rivers (Bobby Womack album) =

Studio album by Bobby Womack
- Released: 1985
- Recorded: 1985
- Genre: R&B
- Length: 41:01
- Label: MCA
- Producer: Bobby Womack, James Gadson

Bobby Womack chronology
The Poet II (1984)	So Many Rivers (1985)	Someday We'll All Be Free (1985)

So Many Rivers is the fifteenth studio album by American singer-songwriter Bobby Womack. The album was released in 1985 on MCA Records. The album debuted at number 66 on the Billboard 200.

== Critical reception ==
Professional ratings
Review scores
Source	Rating
AllMusic	3/5 stars
The Encyclopedia of Popular Music	2/5 stars

So Many Rivers was ranked number 8 among the "Albums of the Year" for 1985 by NME.

== Track listing ==
No.	Title	Writer(s)	Length
1.	"I Wish He Didn't Trust Me So Much"	Harold Payne, James Eubanks, Peter Luboff	3:54
2.	"So, Baby, Don't Leave Home Without It"	Bobby Womack, Harold Payne	4:02
3.	"So Many Rivers"	Bobby Womack, Jim Ford	4:22
4.	"Got to Be with You Tonight"	Bobby Womack, Harold Payne	4:00
5.	"Gypsy Woman"	Curtis Mayfield	4:23
6.	"Whatever Happened to the Times?"	Bobby Womack, Jim Ford	4:16
7.	"Let Me Kiss It Where It Hurts"	Bobby Womack	4:45
8.	"Only Survivor"	Cecil Womack, Linda Womack	3:49
9.	"That's Where It's At"	Sam Cooke	3:42
10.	"Check It Out"	Bobby Womack, Jim Ford	3:48

== Personnel ==
- Bobby Womack - vocals, percussion, backing vocals
- David T. Walker, Jeff Baxter, Robert Palmer - guitar
- David Shields, Nathan Watts - bass guitar
- Dan Lee Butts, Michael Wycoff - keyboards
- Frank "Rusty" Hamilton - synthesizer
- James Gadson - percussion, backing vocals
- Paulinho Da Costa - percussion
- Dorothy Ashby - harp
- Alltrinna Grayson, Curtis Womack, Friendly Womack, Jr., Kathy Bloxson, Kathy Wesley, Mary "Baby Sister" Clayton, Stephanie Spruill, the Waters, Vesta Williams - backing vocals
