= I Don't Know What the World Is Coming To =

Studio album by Bobby Womack
- Released: March 28, 1975
- Recorded: 1974
- Studio: Paramount, Hollywood, California
- Genre: R&B
- Length: 40:54
- Label: United Artists
- Producer: Bobby Womack

Bobby Womack chronology
Lookin' for a Love Again (1974)	I Don't Know What the World Is Coming To (1975)	Safety Zone (1975)

Professional ratings
Review scores
Source	Rating
AllMusic	4.5/5 stars
The Encyclopedia of Popular Music	3/5 stars

I Don't Know What the World Is Coming To is the seventh studio album by American singer-songwriter Bobby Womack. The album was released on March 28, 1975, by United Artists Records. The album debuted at number 126 on the Billboard 200.

In 1978 British rock singer Rod Stewart lifted the melody from "(If You Want My Love) Put Something Down On It" for his hit song "Da Ya Think I'm Sexy?"

== Track listing ==
No.	Title	Writer(s)	Length
1.	"Medley: Interlude #1 / I Don't Know"	Bobby Womack, Truman Thomas	3:14
2.	"Superstar"	Cecil Womack, Mary Womack	3:36
3.	"(If You Want My Love) Put Something Down On It"	Bobby Womack, Cecil Womack	3:43
4.	"Git It"	Bobby Womack, Leon Ware	4:23
5.	"What's Your World"	Leon Ware	5:14
6.	"Check It Out"	Bobby Womack	3:50
7.	"Interlude #2"	Bobby Womack	3:51
8.	"Jealous Love"	Bobby Womack, Cecil Womack	5:48
9.	"It's All Over Now" (featuring Bill Withers)	Bobby Womack	2:55
10.	"Yes, Jesus Loves Me"	Traditional; arranged by Bobby Womack and Roger Dollarhide	4:23

== Personnel ==
- Bobby Womack - guitar, bass guitar, vocals
- Glen Goins, Charles Fullilove, Ken Khristian, Larry Otis - guitar
- Sneaky Pete Kleinow - pedal steel guitar
- Tommy Cogbill, Paul Stallworth, Chuck Rainey - bass guitar
- Truman Thomas, Roger Dollarhide, David Foster, Bobby Wood, William Smith, Leon Ware - keyboards
- Robert Robertie, Ron Selico, Jim Keltner, Bill Braun, Bill Lordan, Larry Zack, Soko Richardson - drums
- Joe Lala - congas
- Jonathan Blair - electric violin
- Cosme DeAguero - vibraphone
- Catherine Gotthoffer - harp
- René Hall - strings
- Bill Withers - vocals on "It's All Over Now"
- Cindy "Sundray" Scott - answer vocals on "What's Your World"
- Linda Lawrence - answer vocals on "Interlude #2"

Technical

- Truman Thomas - associate producer
- Roger Dollarhide - engineer
- Bob Cato, Lloyd Ziff - art direction
- Ria Lewerke - design
- Doug Metzler - photography
