= SAR Records =

Defunct US record label

SAR Records was a record company founded by soul music legend Sam Cooke in 1961. The meaning of "SAR" has been disputed; it has been listed as "Sam & Alex Records" (J.W. Alexander was Cooke's business, song-writing associate, and friend) and also as "Sam, Alex, & Roy Records" (Roy being S. R. Crain, Cooke's mentor from his Soul Stirrers days, as well as his pop road manager).

The label did not feature Cooke, but rather featured all of Cooke's artists such as the latter-day Soul Stirrers with Jimmie Outler and Johnnie Taylor singing lead, The Valentinos (including Bobby Womack), Billy Preston, Mel Carter, The Simms Twins, Johnnie Morisette, L. C. Cooke (Cooke's younger brother), as well as Johnnie Taylor as a pop soloist.

One notable release on SAR was the original version of "It's All Over Now" by The Valentinos which would later be covered by the Rolling Stones.

The label was intended to be a place where Sam Cooke could expand his artistic abilities as a writer/producer and to give other struggling African-American artists a venue to record during the racially charged 1960's. Cooke did record two songs on the label, however, that have only been released since 2001: the solo side of his gospel song "That's Heaven to Me", and "Somewhere There's a Girl" (a secular version of The Valentino's "Somewhere There's a God").

The label folded after Sam Cooke's death on December 11, 1964.

A 2-CD compilation, Sam Cooke's SAR Records Story 1959–1965, was released in 1994 by ABKCO Records.

== See also ==
- List of record labels
