= Jackie Brown =

1997 film by Quentin Tarantino

- Theatrical release poster
- Directed by: Quentin Tarantino
- Written by: Quentin Tarantino
- Based on: Rum Punch by Elmore Leonard
- Produced by: Lawrence Bender
- Starring: Pam Grier; Samuel L. Jackson; Robert Forster; Bridget Fonda; Michael Keaton; Robert De Niro
- Cinematography: Guillermo Navarro
- Edited by: Sally Menke
- Production company: A Band Apart
- Distributed by: Miramax Films
- Release dates: December 8, 1997 (Ziegfeld Theatre); December 25, 1997 (United States)
- Running time: 154 minutes
- Country: United States
- Language: English
- Budget: $12 million
- Box office: $74.7 million

Jackie Brown is a 1997 American crime film written and directed by Quentin Tarantino, based on the 1992 novel Rum Punch by Elmore Leonard. It stars Pam Grier, Samuel L. Jackson, Robert Forster, Bridget Fonda, Michael Keaton and Robert De Niro. In the film, Jackie Brown (Grier), a flight attendant, becomes embroiled in a battle to smuggle money between the United States and Mexico.

Jackie Brown pays homage to 1970s blaxploitation films, particularly Coffy and Foxy Brown, both of which also starred Grier. It is the only feature-length film directed by Tarantino that was based on another work.

Jackie Brown was released in the United States on December 25, 1997, by Miramax Films. It received positive reviews and grossed $74.7 million worldwide on a $12 million budget. It was both Grier and Forster's first lead role in a major film for many years, and earned a nomination for the Academy Award for Best Supporting Actor for Forster, and Golden Globe Award nominations for Jackson and Grier.

== Plot ==
Jackie Brown, a flight attendant, smuggles money from Mexico into the United States for Ordell Robbie, a gun runner in Los Angeles. When Beaumont Livingston—Ordell's bagman—is arrested, Ordell hires bail bondsman Max Cherry to bail him out. Ordell then lures Beaumont into the trunk of a car and murders him.

Acting on information Beaumont already provided, ATF agent Ray Nicolette and LAPD detective Mark Dargus intercept Jackie with Ordell's cash and a bag of cocaine, which Jackie didn't know was with the money. After Jackie is sent to jail, Ordell has Max pay her bail. Upon meeting Jackie, Max immediately becomes smitten. Jackie requests that Max takes her to a bar to get a drink, where Max reveals that Beaumont is dead. After Jackie arrives home, Ordell arrives at Jackie's apartment to kill her, but she pulls out a gun she stole from Max's glovebox. Jackie negotiates a deal with Ordell; she will pretend to help the authorities while smuggling in the remaining $550,000 of Ordell's money.

Ordell replaces Beaumont with Louis Gara, a criminal associate and former cellmate who was recently released from prison. Melanie Ralston, one of Ordell's mistresses, asks Louis to betray Ordell and take the money for themselves. Louis tells Ordell, but Ordell replies that he is not concerned about her, given that he knows that she is not to be trusted.

Unaware of the plan to smuggle in $550,000, Nicolette and Dargus devise a sting to catch Ordell during a transfer of $50,000. Jackie plans to keep the remaining $500,000 for herself. She recruits Max, offering him a 10% cut. During a test run, Jackie smuggles in $10,000, with Nicolette and Dargus aware, to swap with Sheronda, one of Ordell's girlfriends, at a shopping mall. After Jackie leaves, Max observes an unknown woman swap bags with Sheronda. He informs Jackie and she confronts Ordell, who reveals that he sent Simone Hawkins, another mule, to secure his money as a backup.

On the day of the transfer, Ordell discovers that Simone has left town with the $10,000. He reluctantly recruits Melanie to perform the swap instead. Jackie enters a dressing room in a department store to try on a suit. Although she told Nicolette that the exchange will take place in the food court, she told Ordell that she will swap bags in the dressing room. However, the bag contains only $40,000; Jackie leaves the rest in the dressing room for Max to pick up. Jackie takes $5,000 and places it on top of the bag she gives to Melanie. Jackie runs to the food court and finds Nicolette, claiming that Melanie burst into the dressing room and stole the money.

During the exchange, Melanie is uncooperative. In the parking lot, after she makes fun of Louis for forgetting where they parked, Louis fatally shoots her. Louis tells Ordell about Melanie. They then discover that most of the money is missing. When Louis recalls seeing Max at the shopping mall, an enraged Ordell kills Louis. Ordell tries to contact Max, but instead gets Winston, Max's business partner, who passes on the message.

Ordell instructs Max to tell Jackie that he will kill them both if she does not return the money, and that if she goes to the police, he will name her as an accessory. Max goes to the house where Ordell is staying, and tells him that Jackie, frightened, is waiting in Max's office with the money. Ordell holds Max at gunpoint as they enter his office. Jackie yells that Ordell has a gun. Nicolette, Dargus and Winston, hiding in the back, ambush him and shoot him dead. With Ordell, Louis, and Melanie dead, the charges against Jackie are dropped, and she plans a trip to Madrid. Max declines an invitation to join her. They kiss goodbye and he watches her drive away.

== Cast ==
- Pam Grier as Jackie Brown
- Samuel L. Jackson as Ordell Robbie
- Robert Forster as Max Cherry
- Bridget Fonda as Melanie Ralston
- Michael Keaton as ATF Agent Ray Nicolette
- Robert De Niro as Louis Gara
- Michael Bowen as LAPD Detective Mark Dargus
- Chris Tucker as Beaumont Livingston
- LisaGay Hamilton as Sheronda
- Tommy "Tiny" Lister Jr. as Winston
- Hattie Winston as Simone Hawkins
- Sid Haig as Judge
- Aimee Graham as Amy, Billingsley Salesgirl
- Gillian Iliana Waters as Mossberg 500 Tammy Jo
- Michelle Berube as Beretta 12S Brittany
- Denise Crosby as Public Defender
- Ellis E. Williams as Cockatoo Bartender
- T'Keyah Crystal Keymáh as Raynelle
- Quentin Tarantino as Voice on Answering Machine

== Production ==
=== Development ===
After completing Pulp Fiction (1994), Quentin Tarantino and Roger Avary acquired the film rights to Elmore Leonard's novels Rum Punch, Freaky Deaky and Killshot. Tarantino initially planned to film either Freaky Deaky or Killshot and have another director make Rum Punch, but he changed his mind after re-reading Rum Punch, saying that he "fell in love" with the novel all over again. Killshot was subsequently adapted into a film released in 2008, produced by Jackie Brown producer Lawrence Bender.

While adapting Rum Punch into a screenplay, Tarantino changed the ethnicity of the main character from White to Black, as well as renaming her from Burke to Brown, titling the screenplay Jackie Brown. Tarantino hesitated to discuss the changes with Leonard, finally speaking with Leonard as the film was about to start shooting. Leonard loved the screenplay, considering it the best of the twenty-six screen adaptations of his novels and short stories, and also stating that it was possibly the best screenplay he had ever read.

Tarantino's screenplay otherwise closely followed Leonard's novel, incorporating elements of Tarantino's trademark humor and pacing. The screenplay was also influenced by blaxploitation films, but Tarantino said Jackie Brown is not a blaxploitation film.

Jackie Brown alludes to Grier's career in many ways. The film's poster resembles those of Grier's films Coffy (1973) and Foxy Brown (1974) and includes quotes from both films. The typeface for the film's opening titles was also used for those of Foxy Brown; some of the background music is taken from these films, including four songs from Roy Ayers's original score for Coffy.

The film's opening sequence recreates that of The Graduate (1967), in which Dustin Hoffman passes wearily through Los Angeles International Airport past white tiles to a somber "The Sound of Silence" by Simon and Garfunkel. In Jackie Brown, Grier walks to a soaring soul music song, "Across 110th Street" by Bobby Womack, which is from the film Across 110th Street, from the blaxploitation genre, just like Foxy Brown and Coffy.

=== Casting ===
Tarantino wanted Pam Grier to play the title character. She previously read for the Pulp Fiction character Jody, but Tarantino did not believe that audiences would find it plausible for Eric Stoltz to yell at her.

Grier did not expect Tarantino to contact her after the success of Pulp Fiction. When she showed up to read for Jackie Brown, Tarantino had posters of her films in his office. She asked if he had put them up because she was coming to read for his film, and he responded that he was actually planning to take them down before her audition, to avoid making it look like he wanted to impress her.

Several years after the release of the movie, Sylvester Stallone claimed that he turned down the role of Louis Gara. Tarantino considered Paul Newman, Gene Hackman and John Saxon for the role of Max Cherry, before casting Robert Forster.

=== Shooting ===
The film was shot between May and August 1997, having a post-production period of just three months. During this time, Miramax were known for completing films in a short manner, often in time for the end of year awards season, with Scream 2 also having been released in December 1997 following a shooting period between June and August 1997. Shortly after completing Jackie Brown, Bridget Fonda dyed her hair brown and started working on the film Break Up, which Miramax produced as part of a joint venture with Avi Lerner's Nu Image/Millennium Films.

==== Out of Sight ====
While Jackie Brown was in production, Universal Pictures was preparing to begin production on director Steven Soderbergh's 1998 film Out of Sight, an adaptation of Leonard's 1996 novel Out of Sight, which also features the character of Ray Nicolette, and waited to see whom Tarantino would cast as Nicolette for Jackie Brown. Michael Keaton was hesitant to take the part of Ray Nicolette, although Tarantino wanted him for it. Keaton subsequently agreed to play Nicolette again in Out of Sight, uncredited, appearing in one brief scene. Although the legal rights to the character were held by Tarantino and Miramax, as Jackie Brown had been produced first, Tarantino insisted that Miramax not charge Universal for using the character in Out of Sight.

== Reception ==
=== Critical response ===
Review aggregation website Rotten Tomatoes gives it an approval rating of 88% based on 97 reviews and an average rating of 7.60/10. The site's consensus is: "Although somewhat lackadaisical in pace, Jackie Brown proves to be an effective star vehicle for Pam Grier while offering the usual Tarantino wit and charm." Metacritic gives the film a 64 out of 100, based on 23 critic reviews, indicating "generally favorable" reviews. Audiences polled by CinemaScore gave the film an average grade of "B" on a scale of A+ to F.

Roger Ebert of the Chicago Sun-Times rated the film four stars out of four, writing that "Tarantino leaves the hardest questions for last, hides his moves, conceals his strategies in plain view, and gives his characters dialogue that is alive, authentic and spontaneous". He also ranked the film as one of his favorites of 1997.

Movie critic Mark Kermode for BBC Radio 5 Live lists Jackie Brown as his favorite film by Quentin Tarantino. Samuel L. Jackson, who appears frequently in Tarantino's films, named his character of Ordell Robbie as one of his favorite roles.

=== Box office ===
The film grossed $39.7 million in the United States and Canada, and $35.1 million in other territories, for a total gross of $74.7 million, against a budget of $12 million. In its opening weekend, the film grossed $9.3 million, finishing fifth at the box office.

=== Controversy ===
Jackie Brown has attracted criticism for its use of the racial slur "nigger", which is used 38 times, the most in any Tarantino film until Django Unchained (2012) and The Hateful Eight (2015). During an interview with Manohla Dargis, Tarantino said, "The minute any word has that much power, as far as I'm concerned, everyone on the planet should scream it. No word deserves that much power."

The filmmaker Spike Lee criticized the film's use of the word and said, "I'm not against the word, and I use it, but not excessively. And some people speak that way. But, Quentin is infatuated with that word. What does he want to be made – an honorary black man? And he uses it in all his pictures: Pulp Fiction and Reservoir Dogs ... I want Quentin to know that all African-Americans do not think that word is trendy or slick." Lee took his concerns to the film's producers, Harvey Weinstein and Lawrence Bender.

The film critic Pascoe Soyurz said, "I wouldn't necessarily align myself with Spike Lee, but I do have some reservations about a film of this kind coming out at this time. It seems to me there's a kind of culture-vulture feel to it. I'm concerned about the whole 'blaxploitation' thing. Hollywood is a dream factory but it was Hollywood that created some of the most negative images of black people, which had major effects on the way we were perceived around the world." He concludes by stating that Tarantino's use of the word "devalues the word and the word has a lot of significance".

=== Awards ===
Grier and Jackson were nominated for Golden Globe Awards (Grier for Best Actress – Motion Picture Musical or Comedy and Jackson for Best Actor – Motion Picture Musical or Comedy). Forster was nominated for an Academy Award for Best Supporting Actor. The film was also nominated for the prestigious Grand Prix of the Belgian Syndicate of Cinema Critics. In 2008, the film was selected by Empire magazine as one of The 500 Greatest Movies of All Time, ranking at #215.

At the 48th Berlin International Film Festival, Jackson won the Silver Bear for Best Actor award.

Award	Date of ceremony	Category	Recipients	Result
Academy Awards	March 23, 1998	Best Supporting Actor	Robert Forster	Nominated
Awards Circuit Community Awards	3rd ACCAs	Best Adapted Screenplay	Quentin Tarantino	Nominated
Awards Circuit Community Awards	3rd ACCAs	Best Actress	Pam Grier	Nominated
Awards Circuit Community Awards	3rd ACCAs	Best Supporting Actor	Robert Forster	Nominated
Awards Circuit Community Awards	3rd ACCAs	Best Film Editing	Sally Menke	Nominated
Awards Circuit Community Awards	3rd ACCAs	Honorable Mentions (The Next Ten Best Picture Contenders)		Nominated
Berlin International Film Festival	February 11 to 22, 1998	Golden Berlin Bear	Quentin Tarantino	Nominated
Berlin International Film Festival	February 11 to 22, 1998	Silver Bear for Best Actor	Samuel L. Jackson	Won
Chicago Film Critics Association	March 1, 1998	Best Actress	Pam Grier	Nominated
Chicago Film Critics Association	March 1, 1998	Best Supporting Actor	Robert Forster	Nominated
Golden Globe Award	January 18, 1998	Best Actor – Motion Picture Musical or Comedy	Samuel L. Jackson	Nominated
Golden Globe Award	January 18, 1998	Best Actress – Motion Picture Musical or Comedy	Pam Grier	Nominated
Kansas City Film Critics Circle Awards	32nd KCFCC Awards	Best Supporting Actor	Robert Forster	Won
Saturn Awards	24th Saturn Awards	Best Actress	Pam Grier	Nominated
Saturn Awards	24th Saturn Awards	Best Supporting Actor	Robert Forster	Nominated
Screen Actors Guild Award	March 8, 1998	Outstanding Performance by a Female Actor in a Leading Role	Pam Grier	Nominated

== Soundtrack ==
The soundtrack album for Jackie Brown, titled Jackie Brown, was released on December 9, 1997.

Songs by a variety of artists are heard throughout the film, including The Delfonics' "La-La Means I Love You" and "Didn't I (Blow Your Mind This Time)", Bill Withers's "Who Is He", The Grass Roots' "Midnight Confessions", Johnny Cash's "Tennessee Stud", Bloodstone's "Natural High", and Foxy Brown's "(Holy Matrimony) Married to the Firm". There are several songs included that were featured in blaxploitation films as well, including Bobby Womack's "Across 110th Street", from the film Across 110th Street, and Pam Grier's "Long Time Woman", from her 1971 film The Big Doll House. The original soundtrack also features separate tracks with dialogue from the film. Instead of using a new film score, Tarantino incorporated Roy Ayers's funk score from the film Coffy.

A number of songs used in the film do not appear on the soundtrack, such as "Cissy Strut" by The Meters and "Piano Impromptu" by Dick Walter.

== Home media and ownership ==
On August 4, 1998, Jackie Brown was released on VHS in the United States by Disney's Buena Vista Home Entertainment (under the Miramax Home Entertainment banner). A US LaserDisc release followed on September 30, 1998, and that year, the film was also released on LaserDisc in Hong Kong, France, Japan and the United Kingdom. The Japanese LaserDisc was released by Amuse Video, while the Hong Kong LaserDisc was released by Intercontinental Video. The Hong Kong LaserDisc has release specific artwork which features Bridget Fonda's character prominently on the cover, with nearly all other releases featuring Pam Grier's character prominently on the cover.

In the United States, a Special Edition DVD was released in 2002 by Miramax Home Entertainment. It includes an introduction from Tarantino, an hour-long retrospective interview, a subtitle trivia track, chapter selection, a half-hour "making-of" documentary (How It Went Down), the entire "Chicks Who Love Guns" video as seen in the film, many deleted and alternate scenes including an alternate opening title sequence, Siskel and Ebert's reviews, Jackie Brown appearances on MTV, TV spots and theatrical trailers, written reviews, articles and filmographies, and more than an hour of trailers for Pam Grier and Robert Forster films dating onward from the 1960s. The box also includes a mini-poster of the film, and on the reverse, two other mini-posters of Grier and Forster, both similar to the album cover. Although the Special Edition DVD states that the film is presented in a 2.35:1 aspect ratio, it was actually shot with a 1.85:1 ratio, the only Tarantino-directed film to date shot in the ratio, with the exception of his segment in the film Four Rooms, "The Man from Hollywood". Outside of the US, the film had already been released on DVD prior to 2002. In Australia (Region 4) it was released on DVD on June 17, 1999 by Roadshow Entertainment, who had an Australian distribution agreement with Miramax at the time. Roadshow Entertainment had also handled the film's theatrical release in the country.

In 2010, Disney sold Miramax to Filmyard Holdings, with the latter company being a private equity consortium involving firms such as Colony Capital and Tutor-Saliba Corporation. Filmyard Holdings temporarily sublicensed the home media rights for much of Miramax's catalog to Lionsgate. On October 4, 2011, Lionsgate Home Entertainment released Jackie Brown on Blu-ray alongside Pulp Fiction. The film is presented in 1080p high definition in its original 1.85:1 aspect ratio with a DTS-HD Master Audio 5.1 soundtrack. In the 2010s, Filmyard/Lionsgate removed the 1987-1998 Miramax logo from many reissue prints for Miramax films, replacing it with the later Miramax opening logo, which features the New York City skyline. This was the case with Jackie Brown, one of the last films to feature the 1987 Miramax opening logo.

Filmyard Holdings sold Miramax to Qatari state-owned company beIN Media Group in March 2016. In April 2020, ViacomCBS (now known as Paramount Skydance) bought a 49% stake in Miramax from beIN, which gave them the rights to Miramax's 700 film library. The film was subsequently reissued on Blu-ray and DVD by Paramount Pictures Home Entertainment on September 22, 2020, with this being one of many Miramax films reissued on DVD/Blu-ray by Paramount around this time.

In 2023, Tarantino is rumored to have personally bought back the rights to Jackie Brown, along with both Kill Bill films, although this has never been officially confirmed. If true, it would leave Pulp Fiction as his only Miramax film still confirmed to be under the control of Qatar/Paramount. On their official website Miramax still currently list Jackie Brown as one of the films in their library. Tarantino has had a contentious relationship with the current owners of Miramax, as in 2021 they tried to sue him over his plans to sell non-fungible tokens (NFTs) related to his film Pulp Fiction. Lionsgate later announced in May 2023 that they had reacquired the home video distribution rights to Jackie Brown, along with both Kill Bill films, and would be working in conjunction with Tarantino on future releases. All three films were released on Blu-ray and DVD on October 10, 2023, with a 4K remaster of Jackie Brown being released digitally and on Ultra HD Blu-ray on January 21, 2025. It featured several special features from past releases, along with a new critic roundtable video feature.

== See also ==
- Life of Crime (2013)
- Heist film
- List of hood films
- List of works by Quentin Tarantino
