= Someday We'll All Be Free (album) =

Studio album by Bobby Womack
- Released: 1985
- Recorded: 1985
- Studios: Yamaha, Glendale, California; Hit City West, Los Angeles
- Genre: R&B
- Length: 32:17
- Label: Beverly Glen Music
- Producers: Bobby Womack, Patrick Moten; "I Wish I Had Someone to Go Home To" by Andrew Loog Oldham, James Gadson

Bobby Womack chronology
So Many Rivers (1985)	Someday We'll All Be Free (1985)	Womagic (1986)

Professional ratings
Review scores
Source	Rating
AllMusic	3/5 stars
The Encyclopedia of Popular Music	2/5 stars

Someday We'll All Be Free is the sixteenth studio album by American singer-songwriter Bobby Womack. The album was released in 1985, by Beverly Glen Music.

The original version of the song "I Wish I Had Someone to Go Home To" appeared on Womack's album The Poet II, from 1984.

== Track listing ==
No.	Title	Writer(s)	Length
1.	"I'm So Proud"	Cecil Womack	5:01
2.	"Someday We'll All Be Free"	Donny Hathaway, Edward Howard	6:14
3.	"Gifted One"	Cecil Womack, Linda Womack	4:28
4.	"Falling in Love Again"	Bobby Womack	5:21
5.	"Searching for My Love"	Bobby Moore	3:43
6.	"In Over My Heart"	Bobby Womack	3:50
7.	"I Wish I Had Someone to Go Home To"	Cecil Womack, Linda Womack	3:40

== Personnel ==
- Bobby Womack - vocals, guitar
- Charles Fearing, Craig T. Cooper, David T. Walker - guitar
- Abraham Laboriel, David Shields, Freddie Washington, James Jamerson, Nathan East - bass guitar
- Dale Ramsey, Patrick Moten - keyboards
- Clarence McDonald, Dean Gant, Lathan Omar, Ramsey Embick - synthesizer
- Craig T. Cooper, Harvey Mason, James Gadson, Ricky Lawson - drums, drum machine
- Dorothy Ashby - harp
- Eddie "Bongo" Brown, Paulinho Da Costa - percussion
- Don Myrick - saxophone
- Chuck Findley, Gary Grant, Jerry Hey - trumpet
- Angela Winbush, Marva King, the Waters, Van Ross Redding, Vesta Williams - backing vocals

Technical

- Otis Smith - executive producer
- Norman Seeff - cover photography
