= Safety Zone (album) =

Studio album by Bobby Womack
- Released: October 27, 1975
- Recorded: 1975
- Studio: Wally Heider (San Francisco); The Village Recorder (West Los Angeles)
- Genre: R&B
- Length: 42:22
- Label: United Artists
- Producer: David Rubinson

Bobby Womack chronology
I Don't Know What the World Is Coming To (1975)	Safety Zone (1975)	BW Goes C&W (1976)

Professional ratings
Review scores
Source	Rating
AllMusic	3/5 stars
The Encyclopedia of Popular Music	3/5 stars

Safety Zone is the eighth studio album by American singer-songwriter Bobby Womack. The album was released on October 27, 1975, by United Artists Records. The album debuted at number 147 on the Billboard 200.

Although the track "Trust in Me" is a Womack composition, it was initially recorded by Janis Joplin for her 1971 album Pearl. Womack also played acoustic guitar on that recording.

== Track listing ==
All tracks composed by Bobby Womack; except where indicated

No.	Title	Writer(s)	Length
1.	"Everything's Gonna Be Alright"		7:02
2.	"I Wish It Would Rain"	Barrett Strong, Norman Whitfield, Roger Penzabene	4:19
3.	"Trust in Me"		3:51
4.	"Where There's a Will, There's a Way"		6:25
5.	"Love Ain't Something You Can Get for Free"	Melvin Ragin, Ray Parker Jr.	3:24
6.	"Something You Got"	Chris Kenner	5:30
7.	"Daylight"	Bobby Womack, Harold Payne	3:31
8.	"I Feel a Groove Comin' On"		8:33

== Personnel ==
- Bobby Womack - guitar, vocals
- Wah Wah Watson - guitar, associate producer
- Louis Johnson, Willie Weeks - bass
- Sonny Burke - piano, synthesizer
- Herbie Hancock - piano on "I Feel a Groove Comin' On"
- James Gadson, Scott Mathews - drums
- Bill Summers - percussion
- Greg Wright, Ivory Stone, Julia Tillman Waters, Lorna Willard, Pointer Sisters, The Valentinos - backing vocals
