= The Last Soul Man =

Studio album by Bobby Womack
- Released: 1987
- Recorded: 1987
- Genre: Soul
- Length: 45:34
- Label: MCA
- Producers: Bobby Womack, Frank "Rusty" Hamilton; Chips Moman

Bobby Womack chronology
Womagic (1985)	The Last Soul Man (1987)	Save the Children (1989)

The Last Soul Man is a studio album by the American musician Bobby Womack, released in 1987 on MCA Records. "Living in a Box" is a cover of the Living in a Box song.

== Critical reception ==
Professional ratings
Review scores
Source	Rating
AllMusic	3/5 stars
The Encyclopedia of Popular Music	2/5 stars
New Musical Express	8/10
The Philadelphia Inquirer	3/4 stars
The Rolling Stone Album Guide	2/5 stars

The Philadelphia Inquirer called "I Still Love You" "gorgeous soul music for the '80s." The Chicago Tribune noted that "few singers today can match the power of Womack's raspy voice." The Orange County Register listed the album as the sixth best of 1987.

== Track listing ==
No.	Title	Writer(s)	Length
1.	"Living in a Box"	Marcus Vere, Steve Pigott	4:45
2.	"When the Weekend Comes" (featuring Sly Stone)	Bobby Womack, Harold Payne	4:46
3.	"I Still Love You"	Womack	4:40
4.	"Gina"	Womack	5:04
5.	"A World Where No One Cries"	Womack, Payne	4:40
6.	"A Woman Likes to Hear That"	Womack, Payne	4:26
7.	"Real Love Please Stand Up"	Lawrence "Butch" Morris, Erma Shaw	3:49
8.	"The Things We Do (When We're Lonely)"	Dean Pitchford, Tom Snow	4:25
9.	"Falling in Love Again"	Womack, Dan Christian	4:21
10.	"Outside Myself"	Barbara Rothstein, George Michael Elian, Richard Ash	4:20
