= Resurrection (Bobby Womack album) =

Studio album by Bobby Womack
- Released: August 16, 1994
- Recorded: 1994
- Genre: R&B
- Length: 60:07
- Label: Continuum Records
- Producer: Bobby Womack

Bobby Womack chronology
Save the Children (1989)	Resurrection (1994)	Back to My Roots (1999)

Resurrection is the twentieth album by American singer-songwriter Bobby Womack. The album was released on August 16, 1994, by Continuum Records.

== Track listing ==
No.	Title	Length
1.	"Good Ole Days"	4:07
2.	"You Made Me Love Again"	4:10
3.	"So High On Your Love"	4:53
4.	"Don't Break Your Promise (Too Soon)"	4:58
5.	"Forever Love"	4:43
6.	"Please Change Your Mind"	3:45
7.	"Trying Not to Break Down (Duet With Ronald Isley)"	5:25
8.	"Cousin Henry"	6:11
9.	"Centrefield"	4:32
10.	"Goin' Home"	5:44
11.	"Walking On the Wildside"	4:58
12.	"Cry Myself to Sleep"	3:43
13.	"Wish"	5:12
14.	"Color Him Father"	4:31

== Personnel ==
- Bobby Womack - vocals, guitar, arrangements
- Keith Richards, Michael Thompson, Ronnie Wood, Scott McKinstry - guitar
- Larry Kimpel - bass guitar
- Dana Greene, Frank "Rusty" Hamilton, Patrick Moten - keyboards
- Arnold Ramsey, Charlie Watts, Gus Anthony Flores - drums
- Lloyd Tolbert - drums, keyboards
- Earl Mallory, Eddie Synigal, Gerald Albright - saxophone
- Bernard Baisden, Bob Mauzey, Joe Campbell - trombone
- The Valentinos - backing vocals
- Dana Greene (track: 13), Jodi M. Laba (tracks: 1, 10, 12), Rod Stewart (track: 4), Ronald Isley (track: 7) - vocals
