= Womagic =

Studio album by Bobby Womack
- Released: 1986
- Recorded: 1986
- Studio: Yamaha, Glendale, California
- Genre: R&B
- Label: MCA
- Producer: Bobby Womack, Chips Moman, Wayne Linsey

Bobby Womack chronology
Someday We'll All Be Free (1985)	Womagic (1986)	The Last Soul Man (1987)

Professional ratings
Review scores
Source	Rating
AllMusic	3/5 stars
The Encyclopedia of Popular Music	2/5 stars

Womagic is the seventeenth studio album by American singer-songwriter Bobby Womack. The album was released in 1986, by MCA Records.

== Track listing ==
No.	Title	Writer(s)	Length
1.	"(I Wanna) Make Love to You"	Jerry Lynn Williams	4:22
2.	"When the Weekend Comes"	Bobby Womack, Harold Payne	5:33
3.	"The Things We Do (When We're Lonely)"	Dean Pitchford, Tom Snow	3:51
4.	"I Can't Stay Mad"	Bobby Womack, Harold Payne	4:13
5.	"Can'tcha Hear the Children Calling"	Bobby Womack, Harold Payne	4:34
6.	"Outside Myself"	Barbara Rothstein, George Michael Elian, Richard E. Ash	3:17
7.	"I Ain't Got to Love Nobody Else"	Charlie Lee Moore, Lee W. Jones, Jr., Robert Wrightsil	3:20
8.	"More Than Love"	Bobby Wood, Roger Cook	3:25
9.	"It Ain't Me"	Dwania Kyles, Mabon "Teenie" Hodges	4:45
