= The Poet II =

Studio album by Bobby Womack
- Released: March 1984
- Recorded: 1983
- Genre: R&B
- Length: 41:32
- Label: Beverly Glen Music
- Producer: Bobby Womack, Andrew Loog Oldham, James E. Gadson

Bobby Womack chronology
The Poet (1981)	The Poet II (1984)	So Many Rivers (1985)

Professional ratings
Review scores
Source	Rating
AllMusic	3/5 stars
The Encyclopedia of Popular Music	2/5 stars
Record Collector	5/5 stars

The Poet II is the fourteenth studio album by American musician Bobby Womack. The album was released in 1984, by Beverly Glen Music. The album features three duets with Patti LaBelle, including the top three R&B charted ballad, "Love Has Finally Come at Last", and the more modest follow-up, "It Takes a Lot of Strength to Say Goodbye". It also includes the top 75 UK dance hit, "Tell Me Why". NME named it the best album of 1984.

== Track listing ==
No.	Title	Writer(s)	Length
1.	"Love Has Finally Come at Last"	Bobby Womack, Patrick Moten	5:36
2.	"It Takes a Lot of Strength to Say Goodbye"	Chris Brubeck	3:52
3.	"Through the Eyes of a Child"	Bobby Womack, Jim Ford	5:21
4.	"Surprise, Surprise"	Bobby Womack, Jim Ford	3:38
5.	"Tryin' to Get Over You"	Bobby Womack, Jim Ford	4:16
6.	"Tell Me Why"	Bobby Womack, Jim Ford	6:16
7.	"Who's Foolin' Who"	Bobby Womack, Jim Ford	4:02
8.	"I Wish I Had Someone to Go Home To"	Cecil Womack, Linda Womack	3:47
9.	"American Dream"	Bobby Womack, Jim Ford	4:40

"American Dream" contains an excerpt from Martin Luther King Jr.'s 1963 speech "I Have a Dream"

== Personnel ==
- Bobby Womack – vocals, lead guitar, rhythm guitar, arrangements
- Patti LaBelle – vocals
- Courtney Sappington, David T. Walker, George Benson, Robert Palmer – guitar
- David Shields – bass
- Michael Wycoff – keyboards
- Denzil "Broadway" Miller, Frank "Rusty" Hamilton – synthesizer
- James E. Gadson – drums
- Fred Johnson – electronic drums
- Paulinho da Costa – percussion
- Frank "Rusty" Hamilton − harmonica
- Fernando Harkless, Fred Wesley, Harry Kim, Sidney Muldrow, Thurman Green, Wilton Felder – horns
- Dorothy Ashby – harp
- James Gadson, Kathy Bloxson, Regina Womack, the Valentinos, Luther Waters, Julia Waters, Oren Waters, Maxine Waters – background vocals
- David Blumberg – string arrangements

Technical

- Otis Smith – executive producer
- Barney Perkins − mix engineer
