= Back to My Roots (album) =

Studio album by Bobby Womack
- Released: August 24, 1999
- Recorded: 1999
- Genre: Gospel
- Length: 60:11
- Label: The Right Stuff/Capitol/EMI Records
- Producer: Bobby Womack

Bobby Womack chronology
Resurrection (1994)	Back to My Roots (1999)	Traditions (1999)

Professional ratings
Review scores
Source	Rating
AllMusic	4.5/5 stars
The Encyclopedia of Popular Music	3/5 stars

Back to My Roots is the 21st studio album by American singer-songwriter Bobby Womack. The album was released on August 24, 1999, by The Right Stuff Records and Capitol Records.

== Track listing ==
No.	Title	Writer(s)	Length
1.	"Opening Narration"		1:17
2.	"Rug"		5:14
3.	"Stand by Me"	Sam Cooke, J. W. Alexander, Junior Walker	2:39
4.	"Oh Happy Day"	Johann Freylinghausen, Philip Doddridge, Edward F. Rimbault	7:04
5.	"Jesus Be a Fence Around Me"		3:16
6.	"What a Friend We Have in Jesus"	Joseph M. Scriven, Charles C. Converse	3:18
7.	"Where There's a Will There's a Way"		3:33
8.	"I'm Coming Home"		3:24
9.	"It Is Well"		4:46
10.	"Motherless Child"	Traditional	5:19
11.	"Bridge over Troubled Water"	Paul Simon	4:17
12.	"Looking Back"		3:26
13.	"Ease My Troubled Mind"		5:13
14.	"Nearer My God to Thee"		4:55
15.	"Cousin Henry"		5:44
16.	"A Hundred Pounds of Clay"	Bobby Elgin, Luther Dixon, Eddie Snyder	4:09
17.	"Amen/This Little Light of Mine/Closing Narration"		3:39
