= Lookin' for a Love Again =

Studio album by Bobby Womack
- Released: January 11, 1974
- Recorded: 1973
- Studio: Muscle Shoals, Muscle Shoals, Alabama
- Genre: Soul, funk
- Length: 31:11
- Label: United Artists
- Producer: Bobby Womack

Bobby Womack chronology
Facts of Life (1973)	Lookin' for a Love Again (1974)	I Don't Know What the World Is Coming To (1975)

Professional ratings
Review scores
Source	Rating
AllMusic	4/5 stars
The Encyclopedia of Popular Music	3/5 stars

Lookin' for a Love Again is the sixth studio album by American musician Bobby Womack. The album was released on January 11, 1974, by United Artists Records. The album reached #85 on the Billboard U.S. Pop Charts and #5 on the Billboard R&B Charts. It included the hit single "Lookin' for a Love", which charted No. 1 on the Billboard R&B Singles chart and No. 10 on the Billboard Hot 100.

Harry Womack and his other brothers are featured singing background vocals on the album, as they had with previous Bobby releases, and they re-sang their original 1962 hit when they were the Valentinos. Although Bobby had rehearsed the song, he wasn't going to feature it, but eventually went ahead at the insistence of one of his musicians.

== Track listing ==
All tracks composed by Bobby Womack; except where indicated

No.	Title	Writer(s)	Length
1.	"Lookin' for a Love"	J. W. Alexander, Zelda Samuels	2:37
2.	"I Don't Wanna Be Hurt by Ya Love Again"		3:26
3.	"Doing It My Way"		5:36
4.	"Let It Hang Out"		2:22
5.	"Point of No Return"	Jim Ford	2:44
6.	"You're Welcome, Stop on By"	Womack, Truman Thomas	3:40
7.	"You're Messing Up a Good Thing"	Clayton Ivey, Frank Johnson, Terry Woodford	2:34
8.	"Don't Let Me Down"	Thomas	2:04
9.	"Copper Kettle"	Albert Frank Beddoe	3:17
10.	"There's One Thing That Beats Failing"	Womack, Thomas	2:42

== Personnel ==
- Bobby Womack - guitar, vocals, string arrangements
- Rhino Rheinardt, Tippy Armstrong - guitar
- Pete Carr - lead guitar
- Jimmy Johnson - rhythm guitar
- David Hood - bass
- Barry Beckett - Electric Piano, Piano, Moog
- Clayton Ivey - Organ, Clavichord
- Truman Thomas - Electric Piano, Clavichord
- Roger Hawkins - drums
- Friendly Womack, Jr., Curtis Womack, Cecil Womack, Harry Womack - background vocals
- René Hall - string arrangements
- Muscle Shoals Horn Section - horns

Technical

- Gregg Hamm, Jerry Masters, Karat Faye - engineer
- John Kehe, Ria Lewerke - design

== Charts ==
Chart (1974)	Peak position
Billboard Pop Albums	85
Billboard Top Soul Albums	5

=== Singles ===
Year	Single	Chart positions	
Year	Single	U.S. Billboard Hot 100	US R&B
1974	"Lookin' for A Love"	10	1
1974	"You're Welcome, Stop On By"	59	5
