= I Wish He Didn't Trust Me So Much =

1985 song recorded by Bobby Womack

"I Wish He Didn't Trust Me So Much" is a song written by Harold Payne, Pete Luboff & James Eubanks and recorded by soul musician Bobby Womack, released as the leading track off his 1985 album, So Many Rivers, the so-called trilogy to The Poet series of records Womack recorded for Los Angeles–based Beverly Glen Records. The song became one of Womack's final R&B chart-topping hits peaking at number-two on the chart. Womack also shot his first-ever music video with the song which showed Womack singing the song live in a recording studio (the recorded version had different vocals). The song was later referenced by rapper Nas on his song "Blunt Ashes" which talked about Womack's quick marriage to Sam Cooke's widow Barbara Campbell.

== Reception ==
Spin wrote, "This is adult material, friends, in which a man remorsefully confronts everything vile, masochistic, or otherwise depraved about his own sexual being – and then decides to really get into it.
