= Harry Hippie =

Single by Bobby Womack

from the album Understanding
- A-side: "Sweet Caroline (Good Times Never Seemed So Good)"
- Released: December 1972
- Recorded: 1972
- Studio: American Studios, Memphis, Tennessee
- Genre: R&B, deep soul, country soul
- Length: 3:51
- Label: United Artists
- Songwriter: Jim Ford
- Producer: Bobby Womack

Bobby Womack singles chronology
"Woman's Gotta Have It" (1972)	"Harry Hippie" (1972)	"Across 110th Street" (1973)

"Harry Hippie" is a 1972 song written by Jim Ford, who wrote it for singer Bobby Womack as a dedication to his brother, bass guitarist Harry Womack.

== Background ==
The song was loosely based on Bobby's brother's carefree behavior and was originally recorded as a funny tribute to his brother, that turned tragic when Harry Womack was killed by his girlfriend during a fight in 1974. From then on until his death, Bobby Womack sung the song as a dedication to his late brother.

Womack explains the story behind the song and its aftermath:

"Harry was the bass player and tenor for the brothers when we were the Valentinos. He lived a very carefree life. As a child he always said he wanted to live on an Indian reservation. We used to joke about it, but when we got older he was the same way. He always thought I wanted the materialistic things and I said, 'I just want to do my music. My music put me into that comfortable territory.' He didn't want the pressure. We used to laugh and joke about the song when I'd sing it. When he was brutally killed in my home, it was by a jealous girlfriend who he'd lived with for five years. She fought a lot, violence. And in our home it was considered to be worth less than a man to fight a woman, so he didn't fight back and she stabbed him to death. At the time I was in Seattle doing a gig and he was going to join me when we got back. Previously I had hired a new bass player because I felt it would help Harry's relationship with his spouse if he wasn't on the road. And that turned out to be very sour. He ended up losing his life behind it. At that time, "Harry Hippie" wasn't a joke anymore; I had lost a brother. I still do that song in his honor today."

— Bobby Womack

== Chart performance ==
The song was a top-10 R&B hit for Womack when issued as a single in 1973, reaching number eight on the chart, and was Womack's second top-40 hit on the Billboard Hot 100 peaking at number 31 on the chart.

Chart (1972/73)	Peak position
US Billboard Hot 100	31
US Best Selling Soul Singles (Billboard)	8
