= Save the Children (Bobby Womack album) =

Studio album by Bobby Womack
- Released: 1989
- Recorded: 1989
- Genre: Soul
- Length: 48:23
- Label: SOLAR
- Producer: Bobby Womack, Frank "Rusty" Hamilton, Keg Johnson

Bobby Womack chronology
The Last Soul Man (1987)	Save the Children (1989)	Resurrection (1994)

Save the Children is a studio album by American singer-songwriter Bobby Womack. The album was released in 1989 by SOLAR Records. Womack stated that it was influenced by Marvin Gaye's What's Going On.

== Critical reception ==
Professional ratings
Review scores
Source	Rating
AllMusic	2/5 stars

The Philadelphia Inquirer wrote that the album "doesn't play as effectively to Womack's strengths, and frequently eschews the singer's gospel roots for the soul-pop sound of Stevie Wonder's '70s albums."

== Track listing ==
No.	Title	Writer(s)	Length
1.	"Save the Children"	Bobby Womack, Harold Payne	6:32
2.	"Priorities"	Garland Thornton, Wilmer Raglin	5:24
3.	"Too Close for Comfort"	Bobby Womack, Harold Payne	4:50
4.	"Baby I'm Back"	Juan Lively	4:35
5.	"She's My Girl"	Cecil Womack, Kevin Womack	3:57
6.	"Free Love"	Keg Johnson, Sigidi Abdullah	6:02
7.	"How Can It Be"	Bobby Womack, Frank "Rusty" Hamilton, Harold Payne	4:37
8.	"Tough Job"	Bobby Womack, Jon Benson	4:14
9.	"Now We're Together"	Juan Lively, Khalid Thomas	3:46
10.	"Better Love (Everybody's Looking for a Better Love)"	Wilmer Raglin	4:39

== Personnel ==
- Bobby Womack - vocals, guitar
- Curtis Womack, Friendly Womack, Jr. - vocals on "Baby I'm Back"
- Carlos Santana - guitar on "Too Close for Comfort" and "Tough Job"
- Blake Smith - guitar
- Ray Gilliard - bass guitar
- Alicia McCracken, Frank Hamilton, Patrick Moten - keyboards
- Ananias Chambers, Gus Anthony Flores - percussion
- Bernard Baisden, Gerald Albright, Joe Campbell, Lesli Carroll, Nolan Smith, Rastine Calhoun - horns
- Alice Echols, Brandy Diana Moss, Brenda Lee Eager, Hillard Wilson, Lana Clarkson, Michelle Layborn, Pamela Starks, Patricia Henley - backing vocals
- Brad Cole, Cecil Womack, Frank "Rusty" Hamilton, William Zimmerman - programming
- Ron Wood - cover painting
