= That's the Way I Feel About Cha =

Single by Bobby Womack

from the album Communication
- B-side: "Come L'Amore"
- Released: 1972
- Recorded: 1971
- Genre: Soul, R&B
- Length: 5:08 (album version); 3:33 (single version)
- Label: United Artists
- Songwriter(s): Bobby Womack, Jim Grisby, Joe Hicks
- Producer(s): Bobby Womack

Bobby Womack singles chronology
| "The Preacher (Part 2)/More than I Can Stand" (1971) | "That's the Way I Feel About Cha" (1972) | "Sweet Caroline" (1972) |

"That's the Way I Feel About Cha" is a 1972 single co-written, produced and recorded by American rhythm and blues/soul music performer, Bobby Womack, and also became the musician's first crossover Top 40 single on the Billboard Hot 100, reaching number 27. On the US Billboard R&B chart it peaked at number two, starting a four-year run of R&B hits for Womack during that decade.

The single, co-written by Womack, John Grisby and Joe Hicks, was the second release off Womack's Communication album. It put Womack on the musical map as a solo artist, after he started his career as lead singer of the family musical group The Valentinos, and a period where he achieved success as a sideman for soul acts such as Aretha Franklin and Wilson Pickett, and rock singers such as Janis Joplin and Sly Stone.

The song would inspire a few cover versions, with the most notable ones coming from Aretha Franklin from her album Hey Now Hey (The Other Side of the Sky) (1973), and also from the blues singer O.V. Wright.

The single featured Womack's brothers from the Valentinos singing background and instrumental background by the Muscle Shoals instrumental band. Womack played his rhythm guitar in sessions. The guitar riff was provided by Jimmy Johnson.
