= Bobby Womack =

American singer-songwriter (1944–2014)

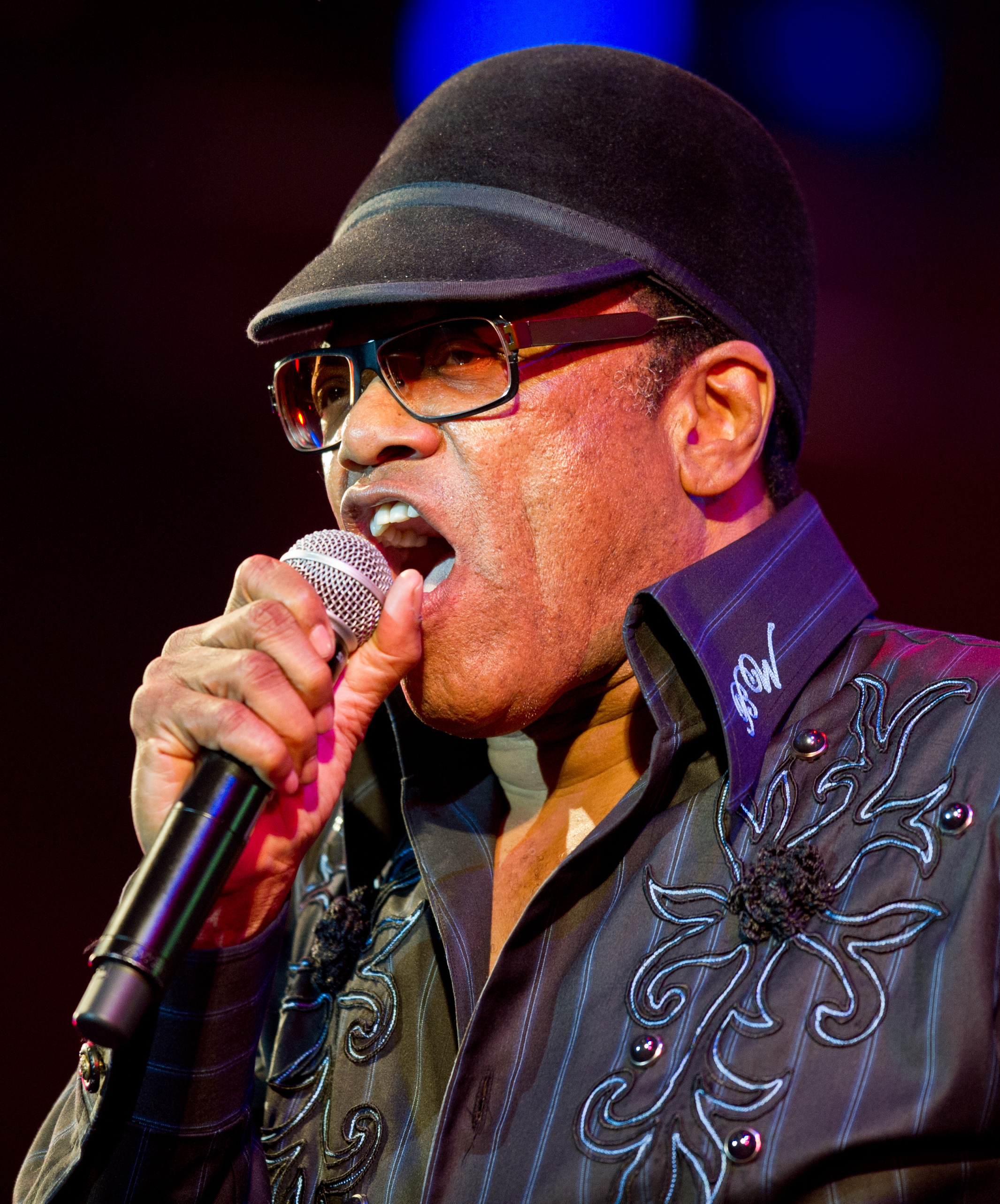
- Womack performing with Gorillaz in 2010

Background information
- Born: Robert Dwayne Womack; March 4, 1944; Cleveland, Ohio, U.S.
- Died: June 27, 2014 (aged 70) Los Angeles, California, U.S.
- Genres: Soul; R&B; gospel; blues; doo-wop; funk; soul blues; southern soul; progressive rock
- Occupations: Singer; songwriter; guitarist; record producer
- Instruments: Vocals; guitar
- Years active: 1952–2014
- Labels: XL; Pennant; SAR; Him; Checker; United Artists; Minit; Beverly Glen; The Right Stuff; Solar; MCA; Columbia; Castle; Indigo
- Website: Official website
- Bobby Womack's voice from the BBC programme Front Row, December 26, 2012.

Robert Dwayne Womack (/ˈwoʊmæk/ WOH-mak; March 4, 1944 – June 27, 2014) was an American singer-songwriter and guitarist. Starting in the early 1950s as the lead singer of his family musical group the Valentinos and as Sam Cooke's backing guitarist, Womack's career spanned more than 60 years and multiple styles, including R&B, blues, doo-wop, gospel, funk, and soul.

Womack was a prolific songwriter who wrote and originally recorded "It's All Over Now" with his brothers, the Valentinos (a song that later became the Rolling Stones' first UK number one hit) and New Birth's "I Can Understand It". As a singer, he is most notable for the hits "Lookin' for a Love", "That's the Way I Feel About Cha", "Woman's Gotta Have It", "Harry Hippie", "Across 110th Street", and his 1980s hits "If You Think You're Lonely Now" and "I Wish He Didn't Trust Me So Much".

In 2009, Womack was inducted into the Rock and Roll Hall of Fame and the Rhythm and Blues Music Hall of Fame in 2025.

== Early life ==
Womack was born in the Fairfax neighborhood of Cleveland, Ohio, near East 85th Street and Quincy Avenue, to Naomi Womack and Friendly Womack, the third of five sons. Friendly Jr. and Curtis were Bobby's older brothers, and Harry and Cecil were his younger brothers. They all grew up in the Cleveland slums, so poor that the family would fish pig snouts out of the local supermarket's trash. He had to share a bed with his brothers. His mother told him he could "sing his way out of the ghetto." Recalling his childhood, Bobby said, "we came up very poor. My kids have had a much better life than I'd ever thought of livin,'" and, "the neighborhood was so ghetto that we didn't bother the rats and they didn't bother us."

Raised Baptist, their mother played the organ for the church choir, and their father was a steelworker, part-time minister, and musician who played the guitar and also sang gospel. Their father repeatedly ordered his sons to not touch his guitar while he was away, yet all five brothers regularly played it while their father was at work. One night, eight-year-old Bobby broke a guitar string, then tried to replace the string with a shoelace. After Friendly deduced that Bobby (who was missing a shoelace) had broken the string, he offered Bobby the chance to play the guitar for him in lieu of a whipping:

Man, I played Andrés Segovia, Elmore James and B.B. King. Even with one string short, I played classical music, soul, country and western, and rock'n'roll. I played my ass off. Every lick I knew and then some I didn't. When I finished, Dad was in shock. He couldn't believe how good I had got and he'd been real selfish holding on to that guitar for himself.

Soon afterwards, Friendly bought guitars for all five of his sons. Because Bobby was left-handed, he flipped his guitar upside-down to play, not knowing that the guitar could have been restrung to accommodate a left-handed player.

== Career ==
By the mid-1950s, 10-year-old Bobby was touring with his brothers on the midwest gospel circuit as The Womack Brothers, along with Naomi on organ and Friendly Sr. on guitar. In 1954, under the moniker Curtis Womack and the Womack Brothers, the group issued the Pennant single, "Buffalo Bill". More records followed.

Sam Cooke, the lead singer of the Soul Stirrers, first saw the group performing in the mid-1950s. He became their mentor and helped them go on tour. They went on national tours with the Staple Singers. Even though Curtis often sang lead, Bobby was allowed to sing alongside him, showcasing his gruff baritone vocals in contrast to his older brother's smoother tenor. During performances, Bobby would sometimes imitate the role of a preacher, which later became his nickname. At just 16, Bobby dropped out of high school.

At the beginning of the 1960s, Cooke formed SAR Records and signed the quintet to the label in 1961, where they released a handful of gospel singles. Then, Cooke changed their name to the Valentinos, relocated them to Los Angeles and convinced them to transition from gospel music to secular soul-and pop-influenced sound. Cooke produced and arranged the group's first hit single, "Lookin' for a Love", which was a pop version of the gospel song "Couldn't Hear Nobody Pray", which they had recorded earlier. The song became an R&B hit and helped land the group an opening spot for James Brown's tour. The group's next hit came in 1964 with the country-tinged "It's All Over Now", co-composed by Bobby. Their version was rising on the charts when the Rolling Stones covered it.

Womack was also a member of Cooke's band, touring and recording with him from 1961. The Valentinos' career was left shaky after Sam Cooke was shot and killed in a Los Angeles motel. Devastated by the news, the brothers disbanded and SAR Records folded. Womack attempted to start his solo career in 1965, first recording for Him Records and later the Chess Records subsidiary, Checker Records. Womack faced backlash after his marriage to Cooke's widow Barbara. He would go to radio stations and disc jockeys would throw away his records. He continued to work as a session musician. Between 1965 and 1968, he toured and recorded with Ray Charles.

=== 1967–1972: Early solo career ===
Circa 1965, Womack relocated to Memphis, Tennessee, where he worked at Chips Moman's American Studios. Womack played guitar on recordings by Joe Tex and the Box Tops, and he played guitar on several of Aretha Franklin's albums, including Lady Soul, but not on the hit song "Chain of Fools", as erroneously reported. His work as a songwriter caught the ear of music executives after Wilson Pickett took a liking to some of Womack's songs and insisted on recording them. Among the songs were "I'm a Midnight Mover" and "I'm in Love".

In 1968, Bobby signed with Minit Records and recorded his first solo album, Fly Me to the Moon, where he scored his first major hit with a cover of the Mamas and the Papas's "California Dreamin'". In 1969, Womack forged a partnership with Gábor Szabó and with Szabó, penned the instrumental "Breezin'", later a hit for George Benson. Womack also worked with rock musicians Sly and the Family Stone and Janis Joplin, contributing vocals and guitar work on the Family Stone's accomplished album There's a Riot Goin' On, and penning the ballad "Trust Me", for Joplin on her album Pearl. Womack was one of the last people to see Joplin alive, having visited her hours before she died at the Landmark Hotel in Los Angeles, California.

After two more albums with Minit, Womack switched labels, signing with United Artists where he changed his attire and his musical direction with the album Communication. The album bolstered his first top 40 hit, "That's the Way I Feel About Cha", which peaked at number two R&B and number 27 on the Billboard Hot 100 in the spring of 1972.

=== 1972–1989: Solo success ===
Following Communication, Womack's profile was raised with two more albums, released in 1972. The first was Understanding, noted for the track "I Can Understand It", later covered by the funk band New Birth and a three-sibling lineup of Bobby's old group, the Valentinos, and two hit singles, "Woman's Gotta Have It" and "Harry Hippie". The latter song was written for Womack by Jim Ford in a country version, which Womack re-arranged in an R&B version. "Harry Hippie" later became Womack's first single to be certified gold. "Woman's Gotta Have It" became Womack's first single to hit number one on the R&B charts.

Another hit album released after Understanding was the soundtrack to the blaxploitation film Across 110th Street. The title track became popular during its initial 1972 release and later would be played during the opening and closing scenes of the 1997 film Jackie Brown. In 1973, Womack released another hit album, Facts of Life, and had a top 40 hit with "Nobody Knows You When You're Down and Out," an older song Sam Cooke had done years before.

In 1974, Womack released his most successful single during this period with a remake of his first hit single, "Lookin' for a Love". His solo version of the song became even more successful than the original with the Valentinos, becoming his second number-one hit on the R&B chart and peaking at number ten on the Billboard Hot 100, becoming his only hit to reach that high on the pop chart. The song was featured on the album Lookin' for a Love Again and featured the minor hit "You're Welcome, Stop on By", later covered by Rufus & Chaka Khan. Womack's career began stalling after Womack received the news of his brother Harry's death. Womack continued to record albums with United Artists through 1975 and 1976 but with less success than previous albums. In 1975, Womack collaborated with Rolling Stones member Ronnie Wood, on Wood's second solo album, Now Look. In 1976, Womack contributed guitar to progressive rock keyboardist Michael Quatro's album Dancers, Romancers, Dreamers & Schemers. Also in 1976, Womack organized a benefit at the Hollywood Palladium to raise funds for his friend, singer Jackie Wilson, who had suffered a heart attack.

Womack languished with his own recordings during the late 1970s but continued to be a frequent collaborator with other artists, most notably Wilton Felder of the Crusaders. After his son Truth Bobby died in 1978, Womack formed a production company named Truth. He hired a new co-producer and Keyboardist, Patrick Moten who worked with Ike Turner and Natalie Cole, and released the album Roads of Life on Arista Records in 1979.

In 1980, Wilton Felder released the album Inherit the Wind on MCA Records, which featured Womack. He had a soulful song featuring on the Wilton Felder single "(No Matter How High I Get) I'll Still Be Looking Up to You", which was originally recorded in 1979 as a bonus track for the same 1980 album although it was officially released in 1985. This song became a soul classic, notably in the UK—Robbie Vincent at Radio London included the track as one of his all-time winners in October 1982. In 1981, Womack signed with Beverly Glen Records and had his first R&B top 10 single in five years—since the 1976 single "Daylight"—with "If You Think You're Lonely Now" that peaked at number three on the R&B singles chart. His accompanying album The Poet include "Secrets", and "Where Do We Go from Here" reached number one on the R&B album charts and is now seen as the high point of his long career, bringing him wider acclaim not only in the U.S. but also in Europe. He had two more R&B top 10 singles during the 1980s including the Patti LaBelle duet, "Love Has Finally Come at Last" (1984), and "I Wish He Didn't Trust Me So Much" (1985). In 1986, Bobby recorded the song "Living in a Box" with new group Living in a Box.

=== 1990–2014: Later career ===
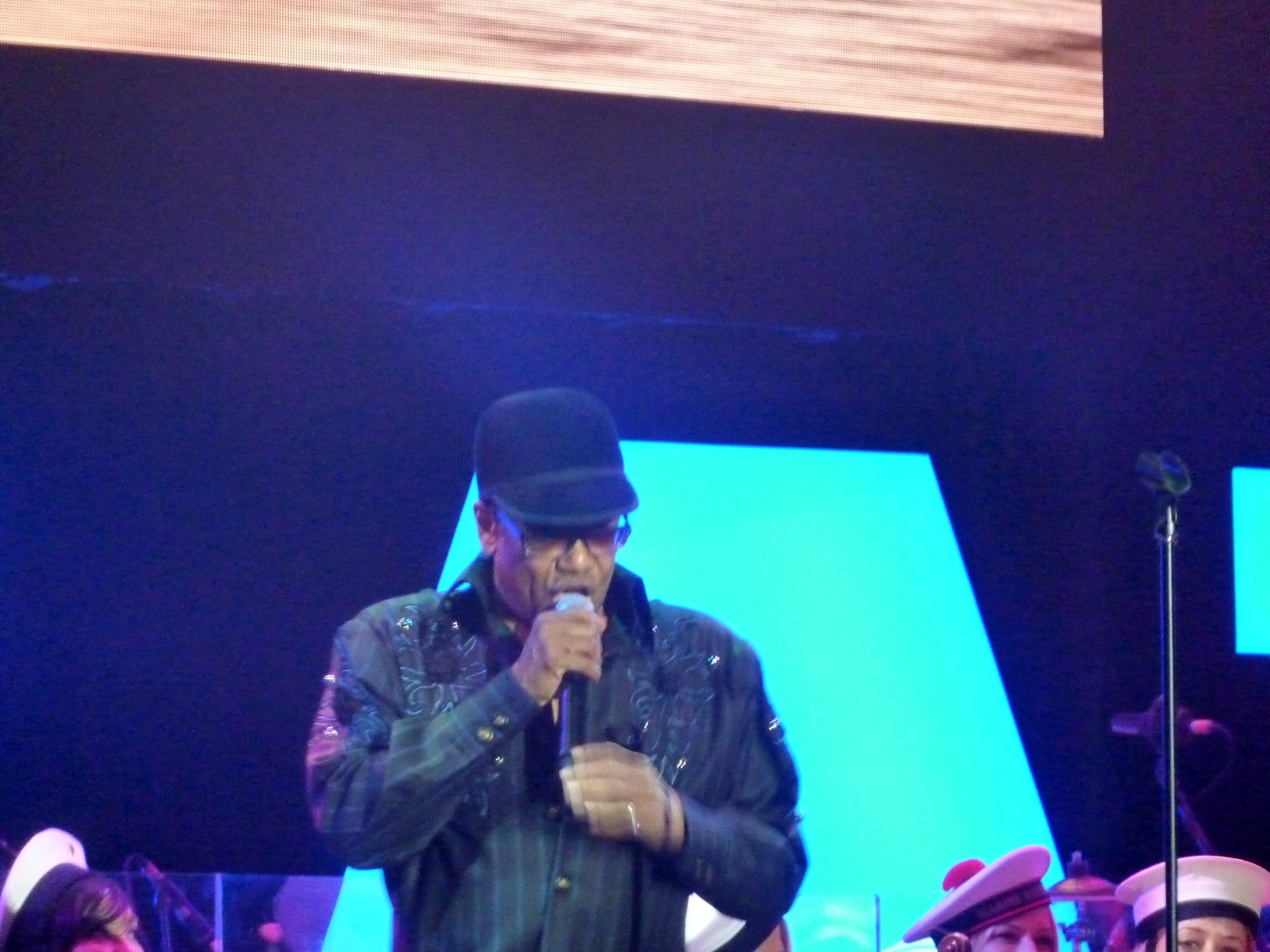
Womack performing in 2010

In 1993 Bobby Womack and Lulu released song "I'm Back for More". Womack's solo career started to slow down after 1994. In the mid-1990s, he released his twentieth studio album, Resurrection, on his close friend's Ronnie Wood's label. The album included session background work from admiring associates that included Rod Stewart, Ronald Isley, Keith Richards and Charlie Watts. His remaining brothers from the Valentinos, Curtis, Friendly and Cecil, featured as background singers. Two singles from the album—a duet with Ronald Isley, "Tryin' Not to Break Down", and "Forever Love"—appeared on the Billboard R&B chart, but although the album contained two of Womack's best latter songs, "Cousin Henry" and "Don't Break Your Promise (Too Soon)", the album received a mixed critical reception. Judges sitting in the high court in London in 2003 ruled that Bobby Womack stole the song "Cry Myself to Sleep" which appeared on the album from Liverpool musician and songwriter Mark Thomas, who never received the outstanding royalty payments due to him.

A gospel album, Back to My Roots, appeared at the end of the decade, but Womack largely concentrated on session and guest work for the next ten years.

In 1986, The Manhattans released the album Back To Basics, which contained songs written and produced by Womack. Womack contributed vocals and acoustic guitar to the songs "Where Did We Go Wrong" (duet with Regina Belle), "I'm Through Trying to Prove My Love to You", "Mr D.J." and "Back into the Night".

He is the featured vocalist on June Yamagishi's My Pleasure album, on "Inherit The Wind", a track credited to Wilton Felder, and with Allen Toussaint on "Sputin", and he contributed vocals to Rae & Christian's version of "Wake Up Everybody". Other collaborations included "You Got What It Takes" with Diane Schuur, "Ain't Nothing Like The Lovin' We Got" with Shirley Brown, "Break the Chain" with Andrew Love & Wayne Jackson and "It's a Man's Man's Man's World" with Jeanie Tracy.

In 1989, Womack sang on Todd Rundgren's "For the Want of a Nail" on the album Nearly Human. In 1998, he performed George Gershwin's "Summertime" with The Roots for the Red Hot Organization's compilation album Red Hot + Rhapsody, a tribute to Gershwin, which raised money for various charities devoted to increasing AIDS awareness and fighting the disease.

In October 1992, Womack held four tribute concert for his friend Eddie Kendricks. Womack planned the concert before Kendricks, who suffered from lung cancer, died on October 5, 1992. Womack headlined the concert; other performers included Chaka Khan, Mary Wilson, and Bill Withers.

In 2010, Womack contributed lyrics and sang on "Stylo" alongside Mos Def, the first single from the third Gorillaz album Plastic Beach. Womack was told to sing whatever was on his mind during the recording of "Stylo". "I was in there for an hour going crazy about love and politics, getting it off my chest," said Womack. He also provided vocals on the song "Cloud of Unknowing" in addition to the song "Bobby in Phoenix" on their December 2010 release The Fall.

A new album was released on June 12, 2012, by XL Recordings. The album, The Bravest Man in the Universe, was produced by Damon Albarn and Richard Russell. The first Song "Please Forgive My Heart" was offered as a free download on XL Recordings' official website on March 8, 2012. Contact Music reported that Womack was working on a blues album called Living in the House of Blues, featuring collaborations with Stevie Wonder, Snoop Dogg, and Rod Stewart. In an interview with Uncut, Womack revealed that the follow-up album would now be called The Best Is Yet to Come and feature Teena Marie and Ronnie Isley.

Womack sang a duet with Van Morrison titled "Some Peace of Mind" on Morrison's 2015 album Duets: Re-working the Catalogue. Womack collaborated with Rudimental on "New Day", a song taken from their second studio album, We the Generation. He had expressed an interest in working with the group, and they had exchanged ideas. Following Womack's death, his wife sent the group an a cappella vocal that he had recorded for them, and they pieced together the track.

Womack's final concert was June 14, 2014, at the Bonnaroo Music Festival in Tennessee.

== Personal life ==
=== Marriages ===
On February 26, 1965, 77 days after Sam Cooke's death, 20-year-old Womack and Cooke's widow Barbara Cooke, who was 9 years his senior, attempted to marry at the Los Angeles county courthouse. Womack wore one of Cooke's suits to the courthouse and the media was present to record the event, but their application was rejected. According to the Los Angeles Sentinel, it was denied because Womack was under 21 years old and did not have his parents' permission to marry. They were married the following week on March 5, the day after his 21st birthday. Their marriage was considered a scandal by some in the music business and Womack found himself ostracized in the soul music world. Womack's brothers turned against him, as did his audiences and disc jockeys. Cooke's family was also enraged. His brothers Charles and David Cook broke Womack's jaw during an attack at a hotel in Chicago. Womack later claimed he initially went to Barbara's side to console her following Cooke's death for fear that if she were left alone, she would "do something crazy."

In 1970, Womack and Barbara separated after she discovered he was having sex with his 17-year-old stepdaughter Linda Cooke (daughter of Barbara and Sam Cooke). In the ensuing tussle, Barbara fired a gun at her husband and the bullet grazed his head. Their divorce was finalized in 1971. According to Womack, Linda never spoke to her mother again.

Womack married his second wife Evelyn Evans when he was 29. She was his personal secretary.

On December 31, 1975, Womack married his third wife, 19-year-old Regina Banks. Together they had three children. In the early 1990s, Regina left him and went to New York. They later remarried in 2013.

=== Children ===
Womack had six children, with two dying before him.

Womack's firstborn from his marriage to Barbara, Vincent Dwayne Womack, was born in 1966. He died by suicide at the age of 21 by a self-inflicted gunshot wound to the head. Barbara had three children from her previous marriage to Sam Cooke: Linda (born 1953), Tracy (born 1960), and Vincent Lance (1961–1963), who drowned in the family pool aged 18 months.

Womack had two sons: Truth Bobby (1978–1978) and Bobby Truth, and a daughter, GinaRe, with his wife Regina. Truth Bobby, whose name was suggested by Womack's friend Sly Stone, died aged 4 months old after falling into a coma when he was found "wedged between the wall and the bed." His death caused Womack to delve deeper into drug addiction. Bobby Truth got involved with gangs and was sent to a youth detention center at about 11 or 12 years old.

Womack fathered two sons, Cory and Jordan, from his relationship with Jody Laba.

=== Family ===
In 1974, Bobby's brother Harry Womack was fatally stabbed in the neck with a steak knife by his girlfriend Patricia Wilson in a jealous rage. She had found another woman's clothes in a room he was occupying at Bobby's house. It turned out that the clothes actually belonged to Bobby's girlfriend. After his death, Bobby established the Harry James Womack Memorial Scholarship Fund in his memory. The $50,000 scholarship fund was to aid minority students complete college, because Harry had always "wished he had gone on and gotten a degree."

Bobby's former stepdaughter, Linda Cooke, co-wrote his 1972 hit song "Woman's Gotta Have It." They collaborated in the late 1970s for her planned debut album. She married Bobby's younger brother Cecil Womack, and the duo teamed up as Womack & Womack.

=== Drug addiction and health issues ===
Womack opened up about his frequent drug use in his memoir, Midnight Mover. Womack said he began using cocaine sometime in the late 1960s. He had become close friends with Sly Stone, and was an enthusiastic participant in Stone's infamous drug binges. Womack told Rolling Stone in 1984: "I was really off into the drugs. Blowing as much coke as I could blow. And drinking. And smoking weed and taking pills. Doing that all day, staying up seven, eight days. Me and Sly [Stone] were running partners."

In 1974, Womack experienced "temporary blindness" after he suffered a concussion from a blow to his head when he flipped backwards over an amplifier during a recording session.

His cocaine use turned into an addiction by the late 1970s. Womack partially attributed his drug addiction to his infant son Truth's death in 1978, which he said changed him forever. Throughout most of the 1980s, Womack struggled with a worsening addiction. During this period his career slowed down significantly, partly as a result of his drug usage. In 1985, after completing 14 one-nighters, Womack was hospitalized after experiencing a blood circulation problem in his left leg. Toward the end of the 1980s, he went into a rehabilitation center to get over his cocaine addiction, which he said he conquered.

Womack survived prostate cancer. A series of health problems would follow, including type 2 diabetes, pneumonia, colon cancer, and early signs of Alzheimer's disease.

Womack developed diabetes in his later years. It was revealed in March 2012 that he had been diagnosed with colon cancer after Bootsy Collins reported it on his Facebook page. Womack announced afterwards that he was to undergo cancer surgery. On May 24, 2012, it was announced that his surgery to remove a tumor from his colon had been successful and he was declared cancer free. On January 1, 2013, Womack admitted that he was struggling to remember his songs and other people's names, and later he was diagnosed with early stages of Alzheimer's disease.

== Death ==
Womack died at his home in Tarzana, California, at the age of 70, on June 27, 2014. He was cremated, and his ashes were interred at the Forest Lawn Memorial Park Cemetery in Glendale, California, in The Great Mausoleum, Memorial Terrace, Memorial Terrace Columbarium.

== Musical legacy ==
In 2009, Calvin Richardson was chosen to record a tribute album to Womack to coincide with Womack's induction into the Rock and Roll Hall of Fame. The Grammy-nominated album was entitled Facts of Life: The Soul of Bobby Womack. It reached No. 30 on the US R&B chart.

In early 2012, Womack's career was the subject of the documentary show Unsung on TV One.

== Awards and nominations ==
In 2009, Womack was inducted into the Rock and Roll Hall of Fame. However, his original vocal group, his brothers, The Valentinos (Friendly Womack Jr., Curtis Womack, Harry Womack and Cecil Womack), were not inducted with him.

In 2011, Womack received his first Grammy nomination for Best Short-Form Music Video for "Stylo" shared with Mos Def & Gorillaz.

In September 2025, Womack was selected for induction into the National Rhythm and Blues Hall of Fame and is slated to be inducted on October 26, 2025.

== Discography ==
- Fly Me to the Moon (1969)
- My Prescription (1970)
- Communication (1971)
- Understanding (1972)
- Facts of Life (1973)
- Lookin' for a Love Again (1974)
- I Don't Know What the World Is Coming To (1975)
- Safety Zone (1975)
- BW Goes C&W (1976)
- Home Is Where the Heart Is (1977)
- Pieces (1978)
- Roads of Life (1979)
- The Poet (1981)
- The Poet II (1984)
- So Many Rivers (1985)
- Someday We'll All Be Free (1985)
- Womagic (1986)
- The Last Soul Man (1987)
- Save the Children (1989)
- Resurrection (1994)
- Back to My Roots (1999)
- Traditions (1999)
- The Bravest Man in the Universe (2012)
