= Understanding (Bobby Womack album) =

Studio album by Bobby Womack
- Released: March 30, 1972
- Recorded: 1972
- Studio: American Sound, Memphis, Tennessee; Muscle Shoals, Muscle Shoals, Alabama
- Genre: Soul, funk
- Length: 35:31
- Label: United Artists
- Producer: Bobby Womack

Bobby Womack chronology
Communication (1971)	Understanding (1972)	Facts of Life (1973)

Singles from Understanding
- 1. "Woman's Gotta Have It" Released: April 22, 1972; 2. "Sweet Caroline" Released: July 27, 1972; 3. "Harry Hippie" Released: December 1972

Professional ratings
Review scores
Source	Rating
AllMusic	4.5/5 stars
The Encyclopedia of Popular Music	3/5 stars

Understanding is the fourth studio album by American musician Bobby Womack. The album was released on March 30, 1972, by United Artists Records. Womack recorded Understanding in Memphis, Tennessee, at American Sound Studio and in Muscle Shoals Sound Studios in Muscle Shoals, Alabama. At Muscle Shoals, he utilized top session players, including drummer Roger Hawkins, guitarists Jimmy Johnson and Tippy Armstrong, bassist David Hood and keyboardist Barry Beckett.

The album reached No. 43 on the Billboard pop albums chart and No. 7 on the R&B albums chart. One of the key songs from the album, "I Can Understand It", has become a soul classic and was a major hit for New Birth the following year. The song was also covered by Womack's brothers the Valentinos (Curtis, Harry and Friendly, Jr.) with production from Bobby. The brothers sing background on the original version. The album version of "I Can Understand It" became a huge club hit in the northeast underground soul and gay clubs prior to the birth of disco. At that time, DJs skillfully played the cut directly from the album. New York City record stores began selling the album briskly when they noticed a highly diverse customer base buying Womack's music.

== Singles ==
The first single released from Understanding was "Woman's Gotta Have It", a warning to a man who was taking his wife for granted, which Womack co-wrote with Darryl Carter and Linda Cooke Womack (Sam Cooke’s daughter). Recorded at American Sound, personnel on the track included Mike Leech on bass, Reggie Young on guitar, Hayward Bishop on drums and percussion, Bobby Wood on piano and Bobby Emmons on organ. With emphasis on Leech’s bass based on a slowed-down version of the bassline on Marvin Gaye's "What's Going On", the track was Womack’s first Number One R&B hit, topping the charts in the spring of 1972. He followed with a cover of Neil Diamond’s 1969 hit "Sweet Caroline (Good Times Never Seemed So Good)". The song had moderate success on the R&B charts, perhaps on the strength of Womack's two previous hits. However, black radio deejays played the B-side, "Harry Hippie."

When the label flipped the single, "Harry Hippie" became the hit, reaching number eight on the R&B charts early in 1973 and giving the artist his first certified gold single. "Harry Hippie" had special meaning to Womack because the song was an ode to his brother Harry, who was found stabbed to death two years later.

Womack explains, "Harry was the bass player and tenor for the brothers when we were the Valentinos. He lived a very carefree life. As a child he always said he wanted to live on an Indian reservation. We used to joke about it, but when we got older he was the same way. He always thought I wanted the materialistic things and I said, 'I just want to do my music. My music put me into that comfortable territory.' He didn’t want the pressure. We used to laugh and joke about the song when I’d sing it. When he was brutally killed in my home, it was by a jealous girlfriend who he’d lived with for four years. She fought a lot, violence. And in our home it was considered to be worth less than a man to fight a woman, so he didn’t fight back and she stabbed him to death. At the time I was in Seattle doing a gig and he was going to join me when we got back. Previously I had hired a new bass player because I felt it would help [Harry’s] relationship with his partner if he weren’t on the road. And that turned out to be very sour. He ended up losing his life behind it. At that time ['Harry Hippie'] wasn’t a joke anymore; I had lost a brother. I still do that song in his honor today."

== Track listing ==
No.	Title	Writer(s)	Length
1.	"I Can Understand It"	Womack	6:36
2.	"Woman's Gotta Have It"	Womack, Linda Womack, Darryl Carter	3:35
3.	"And I Love Her"	John Lennon, Paul McCartney	2:46
4.	"Got to Get You Back"	Chris Green, Jerry Lynn Williams	2:53
5.	"Simple Man"	Womack, Joe Hicks	5:58
6.	"Ruby Dean"	Womack, Joe Hicks	3:27
7.	"Thing Called Love"	Edward Wright, Joe Hicks	3:57
8.	"Sweet Caroline"	Neil Diamond	3:13
9.	"Harry Hippie"	Jim Ford	3:40

== Personnel ==
- Bobby Womack - vocals, guitar
- Tippy Armstrong, Jimmy Johnson, Reggie Young - guitar
- David Hood, Mike Leech - bass
- Barry Beckett, Bobby Emmons, Bobby Wood - keyboards
- Hayward Bishop, Roger Hawkins - drums, percussion
- Ronnie Eades, Harvey Thompson - saxophone
- Harrison Calloway, Jr. - trumpet
- Dale Quillen - trombone
- Friendly Womack, Jr., Curtis Womack, Harry Womack, Cecil Womack, Janice Singleton, Pam Grier, Patrice Holloway - background vocals
- Mike Leech, René Hall - arrangements

== Charts ==
Chart (1972)	Peak position
Billboard Pop Albums	43
Billboard Top Soul Albums	7

=== Singles ===
Year	Single	Chart positions	
Year	Single	US	US R&B
1972	"Woman's Gotta Have It"	60	1
1972	"Sweet Caroline (Good Times Never Seemed So Good)"	51	16
1973	"Harry Hippie"	31	8
