= Facts of Life (album) =

Studio album by Bobby Womack
- Released: June 8, 1973
- Recorded: 1973
- Genre: Soul, funk
- Length: 34:30
- Label: United Artists
- Producer: Bobby Womack

Bobby Womack chronology
Understanding (1972)	Facts of Life (1973)	Lookin' for a Love Again (1974)

Professional ratings
Review scores
Source	Rating
AllMusic	4.5/5 stars
The Encyclopedia of Popular Music	3/5 stars

Facts of Life is the fifth studio album by American musician Bobby Womack. The album was released on June 8, 1973, by United Artists Records. The album raced to No. 6 on the US Billboard R&B chart. It also charted at No. 37 on the Billboard Pop chart. The album included the hit single "Nobody Wants You When You're Down and Out" (which charted No. 2 on the Billboard R&B Singles chart).Recorded in Muscle Shoals, Alabama.

== Track listing ==
No.	Title	Writer(s)	Length
1.	"Nobody Wants You When You're Down and Out"	James Cox	2:59
2.	"I'm Through Trying to Prove My Love to You"	Womack	3:51
3.	"If You Can't Give Her Love (Give Her Up)"	Clayton Ivey, Phillip Mitchell	2:49
4.	"That's Heaven to Me"	Sam Cooke	2:53
5.	"Medley: Holdin' on to My Baby's Love / Nobody"	Womack, George Jackson, Raymond Moore	3:13
6.	"Medley: Fact of Life / He'll Be There When the Sun Goes Down"	Womack	6:21
7.	"Can't Stop a Man in Love"	George Soulé, Terry Woodford	2:24
8.	"The Look of Love"	Burt Bacharach, Hal David	3:51
9.	"Natural Man"	Carole King, Gerry Goffin, Jerry Wexler	2:48
10.	"All Along the Watchtower"	Bob Dylan	3:21

== Personnel ==
- Bobby Womack - guitar, vocals, string and horn arrangements
- Pete Carr, Jimmy Johnson, Dave Turner - guitar
- David Hood, Jerry Masters - bass
- Barry Beckett, Clayton Ivey - keyboards
- Roger Hawkins - drums

Technical

- Jerry Masters, Kerry McNab, Christina Hersch, Steve Melton - engineer
- Mike Salisbury - art direction, design
- Philip Hays - cover illustration

== Charts ==
Chart (1973)	Peak position
Billboard Pop Albums	37
Billboard Top Soul Albums	6

=== Singles ===
Year	Single	Chart positions	
Year	Single	US	US R&B
1973	"Nobody Wants You When You're Down and Out"	29	2
1973	"I'm Through Trying to Prove My Love to You"	—	80
