= It's All Over Now =

1964 song by Bobby Womack and Shirley Womack

"It's All Over Now" is a song written by Bobby Womack and his sister-in-law Shirley Womack. It was first released by the Valentinos, featuring Bobby Womack, in 1964, as the follow-up to their first hit, "Lookin' for a Love". The Rolling Stones heard it on its release and quickly recorded a cover version, which became their first number one hit in the United Kingdom, in July 1964.

== The Valentinos version ==
The Valentinos recorded the song at United Recording in Hollywood on March 24, 1964, and released it two months later. It entered the Billboard Hot 100 on June 27, 1964, and stayed on the chart for two weeks, peaking at number 94.

=== Personnel ===
- Bobby Womack – lead vocals, guitar, co-writer
- Cecil Womack – background vocals
- Harry Womack – background vocals
- Friendly Womack Jr. – background vocals
- Curtis Womack – background vocals
- Sam Cooke – producer

== The Rolling Stones version ==
"It's All Over Now"

Single by the Rolling Stones
- B-side: "Good Times, Bad Times"
- Released: 26 June 1964
- Recorded: 10 June 1964
- Studio: Chess (Chicago)
- Genre: R&B, rock and roll
- Length: 3:27
- Label: Decca F11934
- Songwriters: Bobby Womack, Shirley Womack
- Producer: Andrew Loog Oldham

Rolling Stones UK singles chronology
"Not Fade Away" (1964)	"It's All Over Now" (1964)	"Little Red Rooster" (1964)

Rolling Stones US singles chronology
"Tell Me" (1964)	"It's All Over Now" (1964)	"Time Is on My Side" (1964)

The Rolling Stones landed in New York on June 1, 1964, for their first North American tour, around the time the Valentinos' recording was released. New York radio DJ Murray the K played the song to the Rolling Stones. He also played the Stones' "King Bee" (their Slim Harpo cover) the same night and remarked on their ability to achieve an authentic blues sound. After hearing "It's All Over Now" on that WINS show, the band recorded their version nine days later at Chess Studios in Chicago. Years later, Bobby Womack said in an interview that he had told Sam Cooke he did not want the Rolling Stones to record their version of the song, and that he had told Mick Jagger to get his own song. Cooke convinced him to let the Rolling Stones record the song. Six months later, after receiving the royalty check for the song, Womack told Cooke that Mick Jagger could have any song he wanted.

The Rolling Stones' version of "It's All Over Now" is the most famous version of the song. It was first released as a single in the UK, where it peaked at number 1 on the UK Singles Chart, giving the Rolling Stones their first number one hit. It was the band's third single released in America, and stayed in the Billboard Hot 100 for ten weeks, peaking at number 26. Months later it appeared on their second American album, 12 X 5. The song was a big hit in Europe and was part of the band's live set in the 1960s. Cash Box described it as a "contagious cover of the Valentinos' click" and "an infectious thumper that should head right for chartsville."

In his 2010 autobiography, Life, Keith Richards says that John Lennon criticized his guitar solo on this song and Richards agreed that it was not one of his best.

In 1964 Bill Wyman said, "We just liked the sound of it. We didn't think it sounded country and western until we read it somewhere. It's the 12-string guitar and harmonising that do it. Every one of our records has been different. We don't want to do the same old thing every time or people will get fed up with it."

=== Personnel ===
- Mick Jagger – lead vocals
- Keith Richards – electric lead guitar, backing vocals
- Brian Jones – 12-string electric rhythm guitar, backing vocals
- Bill Wyman – bass
- Charlie Watts – drums
- Ian Stewart – piano

=== Charts ===
Chart (1964)	Peak position
Australia (Kent)	9
Belgium (Ultratop 50 Flanders)	8
Canada Top Singles (RPM)	26
Finland (Soumen Virallinen)	11
Germany (GfK)	14
Ireland (IRMA)	2
Netherlands (Single Top 100)	1
New Zealand (Lever Hit Parade)	2
Norway (VG-lista)	5
Sweden (Kvällstoppen)	3
Sweden (Tio i Topp)	2
UK (Melody Maker)	1
UK Singles (Official Charts)	1
US Billboard Hot 100	26

== Other notable versions ==
- John Anderson on the 1985 album Tokyo, Oklahoma. His version peaked at number 15 on the Billboard Hot Country Singles & Tracks chart.
- Crveni Koralji on Otiđi od nje
- Tunel on Do poslednje kapi...
- Molly Hatchet on the 1979 album Flirtin' with Disaster
- Ry Cooder on the 1974 album Paradise and Lunch
- The Grateful Dead played the song in concert 160 times, with Bob Weir singing lead.
- Rod Stewart on his 1970 album Gasoline Alley
- Waylon Jennings on the album The One and Only Waylon Jennings
- The Dirty Dozen Brass Band on the 1989 album Voodoo featuring Dr. John on vocals

== See also ==
- List of number-one singles from the 1960s (UK)
