= The Valentinos =

American family R&B group

- Also known as: The Womack Brothers
- Origin: Cleveland, Ohio, U.S.
- Genres: Gospel, R&B, soul, doo-wop
- Years active: 1952–1974
- Labels: Pennant, SAR, Chess, Jubilee, Clean
- Past members: Friendly Womack, Jr. Curtis Womack; Bobby Womack; Harry Womack; Cecil Womack

The Valentinos (also known as The Womack Brothers) was an American family R&B group from Cleveland, Ohio, best known for launching the careers of brothers Bobby Womack and Cecil Womack. Bobby went on to find greater fame as a solo artist while Cecil became successful as a member of the husband and wife duo of Womack & Womack with Linda Cooke. The group was well known for R&B hits such as the original versions of "Lookin' for a Love", notably covered by the J. Geils Band and later a solo hit for Bobby Womack, and "It's All Over Now", covered by the Rolling Stones.

== Biography ==
=== Origins ===
The foundation of the Valentinos started in church where the five Womack brothers – Friendly, Jr. (born 1941), Curtis (1942–2017), Bobby (1944–2014), Harry (1945–1974) and Cecil (1947–2013) – performed at their father Friendly's church located from the East 85th & Quincy area of Cleveland. The group started out around 1952 when eight-year-old Bobby Womack played guitar for his father after he had broken a string. Following this, he discovered that all five of his sons could sing, forming the Womack Brothers.

Attracting a gospel following, in 1954, the group, under the name Curtis Womack and the Womack Brothers, cut a single, "Buffalo Bill" with the Pennant label; Bobby Womack was only ten years old at the time of the recording. In 1956, Sam Cooke discovered the group performing while he and his then group, the Soul Stirrers, were headlining and was so impressed with the brothers that he promised to help the group advance in their careers. In 1960, a couple of years after he founded SAR Records and becoming a crossover solo sensation, Cooke made good on his promise signing the teenage act to the label. The group arrived to California in a beat-up Cadillac prior to Cooke signing them.

Still going by The Womack Brothers, SAR cut two gospel singles the group recorded in 1961 and 1962 including "Somebody's Wrong" and "Couldn't Hear Nobody Pray". After the singles failed to chart, Cooke advised the group to go a secular direction. Upon this, they changed their name to the Valentinos and while both Bobby and Curtis continued to switch leads, Sam Cooke reportedly favored Bobby and while some SAR singles featured Curtis in lead, the Bobby-led singles garnered the most airplay.

=== Success ===
Shortly afterwards, the group under its new moniker, recorded "Lookin' for a Love", which was a pop rendition of "Couldn't Hear Nobody Pray". The song peaked at number eight on the R&B charts and number 72 on the Billboard Hot 100, going on to sell two million copies. The hit landed them an opening spot on James Brown & The Famous Flames' national tour.

In early 1964, the group issued their next hit, "It's All Over Now", which was co-written by Bobby and sister-in-law Shirley. Prior to them releasing it, however, word got around that the Rolling Stones wanted to cover it. Despite Bobby's initial protests, the Stones were eventually allowed to release it and their version became their first national hit in the U.S. Bobby's anger cooled after he received his first royalty check for the single following the Stones' release of the single.

Around 1963, Bobby Womack began touring as Sam Cooke's backing guitarist. Bobby added instrumentation to several of Cooke's albums including Night Beat and Ain't That Good News. Around the same time Bobby was one of the first people to hear Cooke's chilling anthem, "A Change Is Gonna Come". In December 1964, the Valentinos' career was put in jeopardy when Cooke was suddenly shot and killed while at a Los Angeles motel.

=== Scandal ===
Struggling to deal with the sudden loss of Cooke, the group temporarily broke up. Not long after Cooke was buried, however, in February of the following year, Bobby, just before his 21st birthday married Cooke's widow, 29-year-old Barbara Cooke. Womack, his family and friends later say that Barbara fell in love with Bobby and convinced him to marry her. Womack even wore one of Sam's suits to the wedding by Barbara's request. The marriage angered many of Cooke's loyal fans due to the fact that Cooke's death was still being investigated at the time. In response to the negative attention, Bobby chose to leave the Valentinos and start his solo career in 1965, first recording for Him Records and later the Chess Records subsidiary, Checker. But due to the Cooke scandal, radio deejays refused to play his records and onstage, he was often referred to as "the kid that married Sam Cooke's wife". Womack settled on session work for the time being as a rhythm guitarist, beginning in 1966, while the rest of the Valentinos, who had initially disbanded following Cooke's death, were urged by Bobby to regroup.

=== Bobby Womack's success, Harry Womack's death and breakup ===
Following Cooke's death, SAR Records folded and the remaining Valentinos auditioned for several record labels before Chess Records picked them up. In 1966, they recorded two singles, "Do It Right" and "Let's Get Together" but both singles failed to chart and the brothers were dropped from the label soon after. Following this, the youngest Valentino, Cecil Womack, was the next brother to leave the group after he decided to marry former Motown singer Mary Wells. Cecil was 19 at the time of the marriage, Wells was 23. In 1968, Wells and Cecil helped the brothers get signed to Jubilee Records. Several of the brothers - including Bobby - contributed to the sessions of Mary Wells' Jubilee album Servin' Up Some Soul, many of the tracks being Cecil and Mary compositions. That same year, the remaining trio of Friendly, Jr., Curtis and Harry recorded the single "Tired of Being Nobody" followed by the Cecil Womack penned "Two Lovers History" before calling it a day.

Meanwhile, Bobby Womack's career was on a rise again, this time as a session musician and songwriter. After contributing guitar to recordings by Aretha Franklin, he gave up some of his compositions to Wilson Pickett, who later took the Womack single, "I'm in Love", to the top 40 on the pop and soul charts. Several of Womack's other songs including "I'm a Midnight Mover" were recorded by Pickett. Following this success, Minit Records signed Bobby and released the album Fly Me to the Moon, which featured the singer's first charted hit, a cover of the Mamas & the Papas' "California Dreaming". Once again being able to have a career after years of struggle following his marriage to Barbara Cooke, Womack continued his session work, working with musicians such as Gábor Szabó, with whom he wrote "Breezin'". By 1970, Womack's brothers rejoined him as background vocalists on his work, starting with the 1970 release of his second solo album, My Prescription.

In 1971, Bobby signed with United Artists Records and released his breakthrough album, Communication, which featured the top ten R&B hit, "That's the Way I Feel About Cha", to which the rest of his brothers (the Valentinos) contributed background vocals. The brothers featured on several of Womack's other albums over the years including Understanding, Facts of Life and Lookin' for a Love Again, the latter album in which the brothers re-recorded "Lookin' for a Love" in a modern funk setting. The remake later shot up to number one R&B and number ten pop becoming the biggest hit the brothers ever sang on, selling over two million copies. Bobby Womack later produced a version of "I Can Understand It" for the remaining Valentinos, releasing it on the Clean Records label. The song gave the Valentinos some traction again on the R&B charts leading to them appearing on Soul Train where Bobby was a frequent guest.

However, this period of success was short-lived. On March 9, 1974, Harry Womack was stabbed to death by his girlfriend during a fight while living in Bobby's Los Angeles home. Bobby said later that he received a phone call from his oldest brother Friendly, Jr., who told him of what had happened to Harry. Bobby was then doing an interview for a local radio station while "Lookin' for a Love" was rising on the charts when he got the call. Bobby said he was shocked by the news and tried to escape the building of the station, later landing in a hospital from his fall where he made a full recovery. In response, Bobby moved his entire family including parents Friendly and Naomi to California to strengthen a fragile family bond. The Valentinos ceased recordings as a group after Harry's death, settling on background work with brother Bobby.

=== Post-breakup ===
Bobby Womack's solo career struggled following the death of his brother as did the careers of the other ex-Valentinos. In 1982, Bobby Womack's solo career received a boost with the release of "If You Think You're Lonely Now", which featured his surviving brothers and other singers backing him. The following year, Cecil Womack, now married to Linda Cooke, Sam Cooke's daughter and Bobby's former stepdaughter, began finding success on his own with Linda as the duo Womack & Womack, releasing the album, Love Wars, which boosted the hit single, "Baby I'm Scared of You", which Cecil and Linda wrote. The duo later had a hugely successful international hit with "Teardrops". Friendly Womack and Curtis Womack continued to provide background vocals for brother Bobby's recordings until the nineties when both singers announced retirements.

An estrangement in the family occurred following the 1977 divorce of Cecil Womack and Mary Wells as it was alleged that a reason for the divorce (filed by Cecil) was due to Mary Wells carrying on an extramarital affair with Curtis. Curtis and Mary continued to date and in 1986, Wells gave birth to Curtis' daughter Sugar. Mary and Cecil had three children during their marriage including record producer Meech Wells (born Cecil Womack, Jr.). In the late eighties, disenchanted with life in the United States and searching for their African roots, Cecil and Linda Womack and their children moved to an African country and changed their name to the Zekkariyas where they continued recording music. As a songwriting team for Philadelphia International Records, the couple wrote hits for Teddy Pendergrass and Patti LaBelle. Cecil died on February 1, 2013, in Africa. In 2009, Bobby Womack was inducted to the Rock & Roll Hall of Fame. During the ceremony, he performed his 1972 hit "Across 110th Street", his 1982 hit, "If You Think You're Lonely Now", and the Valentinos' original hit "It's All Over Now", in which Rolling Stone member Ron Wood backed him. (The Stones made a successful cover version of the song). Wood inducted Womack to the Hall. Womack's family with the exception of Cecil Womack was present for the induction ceremony. The family patriarch and founder of the Womack Brothers, Friendly Womack, Sr., died of cancer in 1981. Their mother, Naomi, died in December 2011.

Some of the group's recordings are most noted for their covers by artists of various genres. Alongside the Rolling Stones, Solomon Burke and Wilson Pickett recorded covers of the Valentinos tunes "Everybody Wants to Fall in Love" and "I Found a True Love", both of which were written solely by Bobby. In 1971, the J Geils Band covered "Lookin' for a Love" a couple years before the brothers re-recorded it for Bobby's solo release, Lookin' for a Love Again. Another composition that was first recorded by Bobby as a solo release and revived by the Valentinos a year later, "I Can Understand It", became a major hit for the funk band New Birth. Prior to her later work with Cecil, Linda helped Bobby co-write the hit "A Woman's Gotta Have It", which also featured Cecil singing background for his brother. Cecil and Linda's composition, "Love TKO", a major hit for Teddy Pendergrass, has been covered several times.

== Naming controversy ==
A popular Australia-based rock combo attempted to appropriate the name of the original Valentinos but had to change their name when faced with the threat of possible litigation by Bobby and his brothers. This group later changed their name to the Lost Valentinos.

Since then, an a cappella doo-wop group and a Detroit-based rock band have also tried to use the original group's name.

== Deaths ==
Four of the five Womack brothers/Valentinos are now deceased.

- Harry died on March 9, 1974
- Cecil died on February 1, 2013,
- Bobby died on June 27, 2014,
- Curtis on May 21, 2017.

Only Friendly Jr. - the eldest brother - remains alive.

== Cover versions ==
- "It's All Over Now" - The Rolling Stones, Rod Stewart, Ry Cooder, Molly Hatchet, Johnny Winter, The Grateful Dead, The Sharks, Bobby Womack (solo), Social Distortion
- "Looking For A Love" - The J. Geils Band, Ryan Shaw, Bobby Womack (solo)
- "I Found A True Love" - Wilson Pickett
- "I'm A Midnight Mover" - Wilson Pickett
- "I'm In Love" - Wilson Pickett
- "Everybody Wants To Fall in Love" - Solomon Burke
- "I Can Understand It" - New Birth

== Partial discography ==
The Valentinos' national and regional hit songs included:

- "Lookin' For A Love" (SAR 132)
- "Baby, Lots of Luck" (SAR 144)
- "It's All Over Now" (SAR 152)
- "Everybody Wants To Fall In Love" (SAR 155)
- "I Found A True Love" (Checker 1122)
- "Do It Right" (Chess 1952)
- "What About Me" (Chess 1952)
- "I'm Gonna Forget About You" (Chess CH-9152)
- "Let's Get Together" (Chess 1977)
- "Sweeter Than The Day Before" (Chess 1977)
- "Tired of Being Nobody" (Jubilee 5636)
- "Two Lovers History" (Jubilee 5650)
- "I Can Understand It" (Clean 60005)
- "Stay Away" (Clean 60007)

In 2015, The Valentinos' Lookin' for a Love: The Complete SAR Recordings was released on CD for the first time.
