= Shoot Out at the Fantasy Factory =

Studio album by Traffic
- Released: February 1973
- Recorded: 1972
- Studios: Strawberry Hill Studios, Jamaica
- Genre: Progressive rock
- Length: 39:18
- Label: Island
- Producer: Steve Winwood

Traffic chronology
The Low Spark of High Heeled Boys (1971)	Shoot Out at the Fantasy Factory (1973)	On the Road (1973)

Shoot Out at the Fantasy Factory is the sixth studio album by English rock band Traffic released in 1973. It followed their 1971 album The Low Spark of High Heeled Boys and contained five songs. Shoot Out, while achieving poorer reviews than its predecessor, did reach number six on the Billboard Pop Albums chart, one space higher than Low Spark had peaked in 1972. Like its predecessor, the original jacket for the Shoot Out LP had its top right and bottom left corners clipped. The album was remastered for CD in 2003.

The album was recorded with four members of the Muscle Shoals Rhythm Section (bassist David Hood, drummer Roger Hawkins, keyboardist Barry Beckett, and guitarist Jimmy Johnson). Hood and Hawkins appear on all the songs, and are listed as members of Traffic on the album sleeve. Beckett and Johnson only play on "Tragic Magic". Hood, Hawkins & Beckett would go on tour with the band as evidenced by the subsequent On the Road album.

== Reception ==
Professional ratings
Review scores
Source	Rating
AllMusic	3/5 stars
Christgau's Record Guide	C

Rolling Stone had a subdued reaction, saying that most of the songs are too even-tempered and uniform in structure and tone, but that "Evening Blue" and "(Sometimes I Feel So) Uninspired" are high points. They summarized that the album "embodies the inconsistencies that beset the band as well as the high points that have kept Traffic moving."

Retrospective reviews were less forgiving, with AllMusic stating that both the compositions and the performances are uniformly weak, adding up to "a competent, if perfunctory effort in the band's familiar style", while Village Voice critic Robert Christgau's review consisted of a single sentence followed by the note 'Giveaway: "(Sometimes I Feel So) Uninspired."'

== Track listing ==
All tracks are written by Steve Winwood and Jim Capaldi, except where indicated.

Side one
No.	Title	Length
1.	"Shoot Out at the Fantasy Factory"	6:05
2.	"Roll Right Stones"	13:40
Total length:		19:45

Side two
No.	Title	Writer(s)	Length
3.	"Evening Blue"		5:19
4.	"Tragic Magic"	Chris Wood	6:43
5.	"(Sometimes I Feel So) Uninspired"		7:31
Total length:			19:33 (39:18)

== Versions of the album ==
The original, full-length master of Shoot Out at the Fantasy Factory was initially only heard on the U.S. vinyl version. This was at a time when Island Records was manufactured and distributed by Capitol Records. When Island's distribution deal with Capitol ended, Traffic submitted a revised master in which "Roll Right Stones" and "Uninspired" were remixed and faded out early. "Uninspired" was shortened by about 15 seconds and "Roll Right Stones" by a full two minutes. This shortened master was used for all subsequent copies of the album until May 2003. With Island's 2003 remaster of the album, the original full-length versions of these songs finally became available on CD. LPs and CDs with the shortened versions of these songs commonly falsely list the longer times for them.

== Personnel ==
=== Traffic ===
- Steve Winwood – lead and backing vocals, acoustic piano, organ, guitars
- Chris Wood – saxophones, flute
- David Hood – bass
- Roger Hawkins – drums
- Jim Capaldi – percussion, backing vocals (2)
- Rebop Kwaku Baah – percussion

=== Additional personnel ===
- Barry Beckett – keyboards (4)
- Jimmy Johnson – clarinet (4)

== Production ==
- Steve Winwood – producer
- Jim Capaldi – producer
- Jerry Masters – engineer
- Steve Melton – engineer
- Tony Wright – cover illustrations
- Tommy Wright – photography

== Charts ==
=== Weekly charts ===
Chart (1973)	Peak position
Australian Albums (Kent Music Report)	35
Canada Top Albums/CDs (RPM)	2
Italian Albums (Musica e Dischi)	20
US Billboard 200	6

=== Year-end charts ===
Chart (1973)	Peak position
US Billboard 200	62

== Certifications ==
Region	Certification	Certified units/sales
United Kingdom (BPI)	Gold	100,000^{^}
United States (RIAA)	Gold	500,000^{^}
^{^} Shipments figures based on certification alone.
