= Chastity (disambiguation) =

Chastity is the sexual behavior of a man or woman acceptable to the ethical norms and guidelines of a certain culture, civilization or religion.

Chastity may also refer to:

== Arts and entertainment ==
- Chastity (1923 film), an American silent drama film
- Chastity (1969 film), a film starring Cher
  - Chastity (soundtrack), Cher's soundtrack album to the film

== Other uses ==
- Chastity (given name), includes list of people and fictional characters with the name
- Operation Chastity, an aborted World War II plan to construct an artificial harbour in Quiberon Bay, France

== See also ==
- The law of chastity, a moral code taught by The Church of Jesus Christ of Latter-day Saints
- Chaste (Marvel Comics)
