= Roger Hawkins (drummer) =

American drummer (1945–2021)

- Hawkins in 1980

Background information
- Born: October 16, 1945; Mishawaka, Indiana, United States
- Died: May 20, 2021 (aged 75) Sheffield, Alabama, United States
- Genres: Soul, R&B, Rock
- Occupation: Session musician
- Instruments: Drums, percussion
- Formerly of: Muscle Shoals Rhythm Section

Roger G. Hawkins (October 16, 1945 – May 20, 2021) was an American drummer best known for playing as part of the studio backing band known as the Muscle Shoals Rhythm Section (also known as the Swampers) of Alabama. Rolling Stone ranked Hawkins number 31 on its list of greatest drummers.

== Biography ==
Hawkins's drumming can be heard on dozens of hit singles, including tracks by Percy Sledge ("When a Man Loves a Woman"), Aretha Franklin ("Respect", "I Never Loved a Man (The Way I Love You)" etc.), Wilson Pickett ("Mustang Sally", "Land of 1000 Dances"), The Staple Singers, Johnnie Taylor, Bobby Womack, Clarence Carter, Etta James, Duane Allman, Joe Cocker, Paul Simon, Bob Seger, Bonnie Bramlett, Bobby "Blue" Bland, Boz Scaggs, Albert King, Traffic, Rod Stewart, Dan Penn, Lulu, and Willie Nelson. He also recorded with Eric Clapton in the early 80's.

"Playing with the same guys for so long, well, it's really hard to impress Barry, David or Jimmy because they've heard me do it before. And it's the same with them. I mean, if Barry plays a hot lick, I don't congratulate him; he's supposed to do that. I don't know what it is, but when the four of us sit down to play, it's almost like a burden has been lifted from our shoulders. It's like, "Hey, we're home."

— Roger Hawkins

Hawkins died at age 75 at his home in Sheffield, Alabama. Hawkins had suffered from numerous health problems including chronic obstructive pulmonary disease.

== Top 40 US hits ==
Artist	Song title	US charts	highest charting date	Miscellaneous
Percy Sledge	When a Man Loves a Woman	#1	April 30, 1966	
Wilson Pickett	Land of a 1000 Dances	#6	August 13, 1966	
James & Bobby Purify	I'm Your Puppet	#6	October 22, 1966	
Wilson Pickett	Mustang Sally	#22	December 10, 1966	
Etta James	Tell Mama	#23	December 30, 1967	
Aretha Franklin	I Never Loved a Man (The Way I Love You)	#9	March 18, 1967	
Aretha Franklin	Respect	#1	May 6, 1967	
Aretha Franklin	Chain of Fools	#2	December 16, 1967	
Aretha Franklin	Since You've Been Gone	#5	March 2, 1968	
Percy Sledge	Take Time to Know Her	#11	April 6, 1968	
Aretha Franklin	Think	#7	May 25, 1968	
Clarence Carter	Slip Away	#6	August 17, 1968	
Wilson Pickett	Hey Jude	#23	January 4, 1969	Duane Allman, guitar
R.B. Greaves	Take a Letter Maria	#2	October 25, 1969	
The Staple Singers	Heavy Makes You Happy	#27	March 20, 1971	
The Staple Singers	Respect Yourself	#12	November 13, 1971	
The Staple Singers	I'll Take You There	#1	April 15, 1972	
Mel & Tim	Starting All Over Again	#19	September 16, 1972	
Paul Simon	Kodachrome	#2	June 2, 1973	
Paul Simon	Loves Me Like a Rock	#2	August 18, 1973	vocals by the Dixie Hummingbirds
Paul Simon	Still Crazy After All These Years	#40	December 6, 1975	
Bob Seger	Mainstreet	#24	May 4, 1977	Silver Bullet Band
Bob Seger	We've Got Tonight	#13	November 25, 1978	Silver Bullet Band
Bob Seger	Old Time Rock & Roll	#28	May 5, 1979	Silver Bullet Band

== Collaborations ==
With Alabama

- 40-Hour Week (RCA Records, 1985)
- The Touch (RCA Records, 1986)

With Paul Anka

- Feelings (United Artists Records, 1975)

With Patti Austin

- Body Language (CTI Records, 1980)
- In My Life (CTI Records, 1983)

With Joan Baez

- Honest Lullaby (Portrait Records, 1979)

With William Bell

- Wow... (Stax Records, 1971)
- Phases of Reality (Stax Records, 1972)

With Bobby Bland

- Midnight Run (Malaco Records, 1989)
- Portrait of the Blues (Malaco Records, 1991)
- Sad Street (Malaco Records, 1995)
- Blues at Midnight (Malaco Records, 2003)

With Bonnie Bramlett

- Lady's Choice (Capricorn Records, 1976)

With Dee Dee Bridgewater

- Dee Dee Bridgewater (Atlantic Records, 1976)

With Dianne Brooks

- Back Stairs in My Life (Reprise Records, 1976)

With James Brown

- The Original Disco Man (Polydor Records, 1979)

With Randy Brown

- Midnight Desire (Chocolate City, 1980)

With Shirley Brown

- Joy & Pain (Malaco Records, 1993)

With Peabo Bryson

- Peabo (Bullet Records, 1976)

With Jimmy Buffett

- Beach House on the Moon (Island Records, 1999)

With Solomon Burke

- King Solomon (Atlantic Records, 1968)
- Proud Mary (Ola, 1969)

With Billy Burnette

- Gimme You (Columbia Records, 1981)

With JJ Cale

- Really (A&M Records, 1972)

With Canned Heat

- One More River to Cross (Atlantic Records, 1973)

With Kim Carnes

- Sailin' (A&M Records, 1976)

With Clarence Carter

- This is Clarence Carter (Atlantic Records, 1968)
- Testifyin' (Atlantic Records, 1969)
- The Dynamic Clarence Carter (Atlantic Records, 1969)

With Beth Nielsen Chapman

- Hearing It First (Capitol Records, 1980)

With Cher

- 3614 Jackson Highway (Atco Records, 1969)

With Eric Clapton

- Money and Cigarettes (Warner Bros. Records, 1983)

With Jimmy Cliff

- Another Cycle (Island Records, 1971)

With Joe Cocker

- Luxury You Can Afford (Asylum Records, 1978)

With Ry Cooder

- Boomer's Story (Reprise Records, 1972)

With Steve Cropper

- Night After Night (MCA Records, 1982)

With Gail Davies

- The Game (Warner Bros. Records, 1980)

With Mink DeVille

- Sportin' Life (Polydor Records, 1985)

With Willy DeVille

- Horse of a Different Color (EastWest Records, 1999)

With The Dramatics

- Joy Ride (ABC, 1976)

With José Feliciano

- Sweet Soul Music (Private Stock Records, 1976)

With Eddie Floyd

- Soul Street (Stax Records, 1974)

With Aretha Franklin

- Aretha Arrives (Rhino Records, 1967)
- Lady Soul (Rhino Records, 1968)
- Aretha Now (Atlantic Records, 1968)
- Soul '69 (Atlantic Records, 1969)
- This Girl's in Love with You (Atlantic Records, 1970)
- Spirit in the Dark (Atlantic Records, 1970)
- Hey Now Hey (The Other Side of the Sky) (Atlantic Records, 1973)

With Glenn Frey

- No Fun Aloud (Asylum Records, 1982)
- Soul Searchin' (MCA Records, 1988)

With Art Garfunkel

- Breakaway (Columbia Records, 1975)
- Watermark (Columbia Records, 1977)

With Barry Goldberg

- Barry Goldberg (Atco Records, 1974)

With James Govan

- I'm in Need (Charity, 1987)

With John P. Hammond

- Southern Fried (Atlantic Records, 1971)
- Can't Beat the Kid (Capricorn Records, 1975)

With Ronnie Hawkins

- Ronnie Hawkins (Cotillion Records, 1970)

With Levon Helm

- Levon Helm (ABC Records, 1978)
- Levon Helm (Capitol Records, 1982)

With Loleatta Holloway

- Loleatta Holloway (Goldon Mind Records, 1979)
- Love Sensation (Goldon Mind Records, 1980)

With Etta James

- Tell Mama (Cadet Records, 1968)
- Seven Year Itch (Island Records, 1988)
- Stickin' to My Guns (Island Records, 1990)
- The Right Time (Elektra Records, 1992)

With Margie Joseph

- Margie Joseph Make a New Impression (Volt Records, 1971)

With Nick Kamen

- Nick Kamen (WEA, 1987)

With Albert King

- Lovejoy (Stax Records, 1971)

With Julian Lennon

- Valotte (Atlantic Records, 1984)

With Lulu

- New Routes (Atlantic Records, 1970)

With Mary MacGregor

- Torn Between Two Lovers (Ariola Records, 1976)

With Lonnie Mack

- The Hills of Indiana (Elektra Records, 1971)
- Roadhouses and Dance Halls (Epic Records, 1988)

With Mac McAnally

- Nothing but the Truth (Geffen, 1983)
- Knots (MCA Records, 1994)

With Delbert McClinton

- Second Wind (Capricorn Records, 1978)
- The Jealous Kind (Capitol Records, 1980)
- Plain from the Heart (Capitol Records, 1981)

With Mel and Tim

- Starting All Over Again (Stax Records, 1972)
- Mel & Tim (Stax Records, 1973)

With Frankie Miller

- Standing on the Edge (Capitol Records, 1982)

With Ronnie Milsap

- Ronnie Milsap (Warner Bros. Records, 1971)
- Keyed Up (RCA Records, 1983)

With Jackie Moore

- Make Me Feel Like a Woman (Kayvette, 1975)

With Willie Nelson

- Phases and Stages (Atlantic Records, 1974)

With Laura Nyro

- Christmas and the Beads of Sweat (Columbia Records, 1970)

With The Oak Ridge Boys

- American Made (MCA Records, 1983)
- Deliver (MCA Records, 1983)
- Step On Out (MCA Records, 1985)
- Seasons (MCA Records, 1986)

With Odetta

- Odetta Sings (Polydor Records, 1970)

With Danny O'Keefe

- Danny O'Keefe (Cotillion, 1970)

With Tony Orlando

- Tony Orlando (Elektra, 1978)

With Dan Penn

- Nobody's Fool (Bell Records, 1973)
- Do Right Man (Sire Records, 1994)
- Blue Nite Lounge (Dandy Records, 2000)
- Something About the Night (Dandy Records, 2016)

With Wilson Pickett

- The Exciting Wilson Pickett (Atlantic Records, 1966)
- The Wicked Pickett (Atlantic Records, 1967)
- The Sound of Wilson Pickett (Atlantic Records, 1967)
- Hey Jude (Atlantic Records, 1969)
- Right On (Atlantic Records, 1970)
- Don't Knock My Love (Atlantic Records, 1971)
- Funky Situation (Big Tree Records, 1978)

With Don Preston

- Been Here All The Time (Shelter Records, 1974)

With Primal Scream

- Give Out but Don't Give Up (Sire Records, 1994)

With Eddie Rabbitt

- Loveline (Elektra Records, 1979)

With Helen Reddy

- Take What You Find (Capitol Records, 1980)

With Little Richard

- The Rill Thing (Reprise Records, 1970)

With Johnny Rivers

- The Road (Atlantic Records, 1974)
- Borrowed Time (RSO Records, 1980)

With Linda Ronstadt

- Linda Ronstadt (Capitol Records, 1971)

With Billy Joe Royal

- Tell It Like It Is (Atlantic Records, 1989)

With Calvin Russell

- Calvin Russell (Last Call Records, 1997)
- Sam (Last Call Records, 1999)

With Leon Russell

- Leon Russell and the Shelter People (Shelter Records, 1971)

With Boz Scaggs

- Boz Scaggs (Atlantic Records, 1969)
- My Time (Columbia Records, 1972)

With Bob Seger

- Back in '72 (Reprise Records, 1973)
- Beautiful Loser (Capitol Records, 1975)
- Night Moves (Capitol Records, 1976)
- Stranger in Town (Capitol Records, 1978)
- Against the Wind (Capitol Records, 1980)
- The Distance (Capitol Records, 1982)

With Joe Simon

- Easy to Love (Spring Records, 1977)

With John Simon

- John Simon's Album (Warner Bros. Records, 1970)

With Paul Simon

- There Goes Rhymin' Simon (Columbia Records, 1973)
- Still Crazy After All These Years (Columbia Records, 1975)

With Percy Sledge

- The Percy Sledge Way (Atlantic Records, 1967)
- I'll Be Your Everything (Capricorn Records, 1974)

With Mavis Staples

- Mavis Staples (Volt Records, 1969)
- Only for the Lonely (Volt Records, 1970)
- Oh What a Feeling (Warner Bros. Records, 1979)

With The Staple Singers

- Be Altitude: Respect Yourself (Stax Records, 1972)
- Unlock Your Mind (Warner Bros. Records, 1978)

With Starland Vocal Band

- 4 X 4 (Windsong, 1980)

With Candi Staton

- Candi (Warner Bros. Records, 1974)

With Cat Stevens

- Izitso (A&M Records, 1977)

With B. W. Stevenson

- Rainbow Down the Road (Amazing Records, 1990)

With Rod Stewart

- Atlantic Crossing (Warner Bros. Records, 1975)
- A Night on the Town (Warner Bros. Records, 1976)

With Billy Swan

- Four (Columbia Records, 1977)

With The Sweet Inspirations

- Sweets for My Sweet (Atlantic Records, 1969)

With Keith Sykes

- The Way That I Feel (Midland Records, 1977)

With Alex Taylor

- Dinnertime (Capricorn Records, 1972)

With Kate Taylor

- It's in There (CBS Records, 1979)

With Traffic

- Shoot Out at the Fantasy Factory (Island Records, 1973)

With Vaya Con Dios

- Roots and Wings (Ariola Records, 1995)

With Wendy Waldman

- Gypsy Symphony (Warner Bros. Records, 1974)

With Tony Joe White

- The Train I'm On (Warner Brothers, 1972)
- Closer to the Truth (Festival Records, 1991)

With Bobby Womack

- Communication (United Artists Records, 1971)
- Understanding (United Artists Records, 1972)
- Facts of Life (United Artists Records, 1973)
- Lookin' for a Love Again (United Artists Records, 1974)
- Home Is Where the Heart Is (Columbia Records, 1977)
- Pieces (Columbia Records, 1978)
- Roads of Life (Arista Records, 1979)

== Notes ==
- Weinberg, Max (2004). The Big Beat: Conversations with Rock's Greatest Drummers. Hudson Music. pp. 44–59. ISBN 978-0634082757.
- Whitburn, Joel (1992). The Billboard Book of Top 40 Hits. Billboard Books. ISBN 978-0823082803.
- Muscle Shoals Sound (liner notes). Various Artists. Rhino Records. 1993. R2-71517.
- The Exciting Wilson Pickett (liner notes). Wilson Pickett. Atlantic Records. 2002.
- Greatest Hits (liner notes). Bob Seger. Capitol Records. 1994.
