= Roads of Life =

Studio album by Bobby Womack
- Released: 1979
- Recorded: 1979
- Studio: Muscle Shoals, Sheffield, Alabama; Magic Wand, Los Angeles, California
- Genre: R&B, soul
- Length: 38:42
- Label: Arista
- Producer: Bobby Womack, Patrick Moten, the Muscle Shoals Rhythm Section

Bobby Womack chronology
Pieces (1978)	Roads of Life (1979)	The Poet (1981)

Roads of Life is the twelfth studio album by American musician Bobby Womack. It was released in 1979 by Arista Records. It was dedicated to his late son Truth Womack (January 27, 1978 – June 2, 1978). The album was Bobby Womack's only album for Arista Records. It reached number 55 on the Top Soul Albums charts.

== Critical reception ==
Professional ratings
Review scores
Source	Rating
AllMusic	2/5 stars
The Virgin Encyclopedia of R&B and Soul	2/5 stars

The Bay State Banner noted that "most of Womack's ... session choices are California jazz men whose preoccupations are far from the vernacular vamping you hear in progressive disco boogie or the baroque elegance of such Chicago soul dreams as Tyrone Davis and Peabo Bryson songs."

== Track listing ==
No.	Title	Writer(s)	Length
1.	"The Roads of Life"	Bobby Womack, Cecil Womack	5:28
2.	"How Could You Break My Heart"	Bobby Womack, Patrick Moten	5:17
3.	"Honey Dripper Boogie"	Bobby Womack	4:51
4.	"The Roots in Me"	Bobby Womack, Leon Ware	4:49
5.	"What Are You Doin'"	Bobby Womack, Cecil Womack	4:29
6.	"Give It Up"	Bobby Womack, Cecil Womack	4:39
7.	"Mr. D.J. Don't Stop the Music"	Bobby Womack	5:17
8.	"I Honestly Love You"	Peter Allen, Jeff Barry	3:50

== Personnel ==
- Bobby Womack - lead vocals, guitar
- Larry Byrom, Jimmy Johnson, Howie McDonald, Cecil Womack, Reggie Young - guitar
- David Hood, Anthony Willis, Bob Wray - bass
- Jack Ashford, Eddie "Bongo" Brown, Jimmy "Bebop" Evans, Roger Hawkins - drums, percussion
- Barry Beckett, Tim Henson, Randy McCormick, Patrick Moten - keyboards
- Ben Cauley, Charles Rose, Harrison Calloway, Harvey Thompson, Ronnie Eades, Wayne Jackson - horns
- Melissa Manchester - guest vocals on "The Roots in Me"
- Pat Hodges, Denita James, Jessica Smith (Hodges, James & Smith) - backing vocals
- Leon Ware - vocal arrangements

== Charts ==
Chart (1979)	Peak position
Top Soul Albums	55

=== Singles ===
Year	Single	Chart positions
Year	Single	US R&B
1978	"How Could You Break My Heart "	40
