= Pieces (Bobby Womack album) =

Studio album by Bobby Womack
- Released: 1978
- Recorded: 1978
- Studio: Muscle Shoals, Sheffield, Alabama; United Sound Systems, Detroit, Michigan
- Genre: R&B
- Length: 33:59
- Label: Columbia
- Producer: Don Davis

Bobby Womack chronology
Home Is Where the Heart Is (1976)	Pieces (1978)	Roads of Life (1979)

Professional ratings
Review scores
Source	Rating
Allmusic	3/5 stars
The Encyclopedia of Popular Music	2/5 stars

Pieces is the eleventh studio album by American singer-songwriter Bobby Womack. The album was released in 1978, by Columbia Records.

== Track listing ==
No.	Title	Writer(s)	Length
1.	"It's Party Time"	Don Davis, Willie Schofield	4:09
2.	"Trust Your Heart"	Bobby Womack, Don Davis, Leon Ware	3:56
3.	"Stop Before We Start"	Arenita Walker, Cynthia Girty	3:27
4.	"When Love Begins Friendship Ends"	Allee Willis	5:19
5.	"Wind It Up"	Bobby Womack, Cecil Womack, Leon Ware	3:57
6.	"Is This the Thanks I Get"	Jimmy George, John Hammond	3:19
7.	"Caught Up in the Middle"	Don Davis, Jerry Don Stephens, Ronnie McNeir	5:21
8.	"Never Let Nothing Get the Best of You"	Bobby Womack, Cecil Womack	4:31

== Personnel ==
- Bobby Womack - guitar, vocals
- Glen Goins, Jimmy Johnson, Eddie Willis - guitar
- Aaron Willis, Anthony Willis - guitar, bass
- Bruce Nazarian - guitar, ARP synthesizer
- Michael Henderson, David Hood - bass
- Barry Beckett - keyboards
- Rudy Robinson - keyboards, synthesizer, clavinet, vibraphone
- Roger Hawkins, Dwayne Lomax - drums
- Larry Fratangelo, Barbara Huby - percussion
- Kerry Campbell - saxophone
- Candi Staton - vocals on "Trust Your Heart" and "Stop Before We Start"
- Brandye, David Ruffin - backing vocals
- Detroit Horns, Horny Horns - horns
- Detroit Symphony Orchestra - strings
- David Van De Pitte, Wade Marcus, Fred Wesley, Jeffrey Steinberg, Bernie Worrell, Rudy Robinson - arrangements

Technical

- Roger Williams - artwork, design
