= Still Crazy After All These Years =

Studio album by Paul Simon
- Released: October 25, 1975
- Studios: A&R Recording, New York
- Genre: Jazz pop
- Length: 35:24
- Label: Columbia
- Producers: Paul Simon; Phil Ramone

Paul Simon chronology
Paul Simon in Concert: Live Rhymin' (1974)	Still Crazy After All These Years (1975)	Greatest Hits, Etc. (1977)

Singles from Still Crazy After All These Years
- 1. "Gone at Last" Released: August 1975; 2. "My Little Town" Released: October 1975; 3. "50 Ways to Leave Your Lover" Released: December 1975; 4. "Still Crazy After All These Years" Released: March 1976

Retrospective professional ratings
Review scores
Source	Rating
AllMusic	4.5/5 stars
Blender	4/5 stars
Chicago Tribune	3/4 stars
Christgau's Record Guide	B
Encyclopedia of Popular Music	4/5 stars
Entertainment Weekly	B+
The Guardian	4/5 stars
Record Collector	4/5 stars
The Rolling Stone Album Guide	5/5 stars
Uncut	4/5 stars

Still Crazy After All These Years is the fourth solo studio album by American singer-songwriter Paul Simon, released on October 25, 1975, by Columbia Records. Recorded and released in 1975, the album produced four U.S. Top 40 hits: "50 Ways to Leave Your Lover" (No. 1), "Gone at Last" (No. 23, credited to Paul Simon/Phoebe Snow), "My Little Town" (No. 9, credited to Simon & Garfunkel), and the title track (No. 40). It won two Grammy Awards for Album of the Year and Best Male Pop Vocal Performance in 1976.

== Recording ==
"My Little Town" reunited Simon with former partner Art Garfunkel on record for the first time since 1970, while "Gone at Last" was a duet between Simon and Phoebe Snow. Two tracks featured members of the Muscle Shoals Rhythm Section as a backing band.

== Notable cover versions ==
Herbie Hancock recorded a version of "I Do It for Your Love", featuring Paul Simon, on his 2005 album Possibilities.

== Track listing ==
All tracks are written by Paul Simon.

Side one
No.	Title	Length
1.	"Still Crazy After All These Years"	3:26
2.	"My Little Town"	3:51
3.	"I Do It for Your Love"	3:35
4.	"50 Ways to Leave Your Lover"	3:37
5.	"Night Game"	2:58
Total length:		17:27

Side two
No.	Title	Length
6.	"Gone at Last"	3:40
7.	"Some Folks' Lives Roll Easy"	3:14
8.	"Have a Good Time"	3:26
9.	"You're Kind"	3:20
10.	"Silent Eyes"	4:12
Total length:		17:52 35:19

== Personnel ==
- Paul Simon – vocals, acoustic guitar (2, 3, 4, 9), electric guitar (5), string arrangements (7), horn arrangements (7, 9)
- Barry Beckett – Fender Rhodes (1), acoustic piano (2)
- Bob James – woodwind arrangements (1), string arrangements (1, 3), Fender Rhodes (7, 8)
- Kenneth Ascher – Fender Rhodes (3), organ (4)
- Sivuca – accordion (3), vocal solo (3)
- Richard Tee – acoustic piano (6)
- Leon Pendarvis – acoustic piano (10)
- Pete Carr – electric guitar (2)
- Joe Beck – electric guitar (3, 8, 9)
- Jerry Friedman – electric guitar (3)
- Hugh McCracken – electric guitar (4, 7, 8), acoustic guitar (9)
- John Tropea – electric guitar (4)
- David Hood – bass (1, 2)
- Tony Levin – bass (3, 4, 5, 7–10)
- Gordon Edwards – bass (6)
- Roger Hawkins – drums (1, 2)
- Steve Gadd – drums (3, 4, 7–10)
- Grady Tate – drums (6)
- Ralph MacDonald – percussion (2, 3, 4, 6, 8)
- Toots Thielemans – harmonica (5)
- Michael Brecker – tenor sax solo (1), saxophone (7)
- Eddie Daniels – saxophone (7)
- David Sanborn – saxophone (7)
- Phil Woods – alto sax solo (8)
- David Mathews – horn arrangements (2, 8)
- Art Garfunkel – vocals (2)
- Patti Austin – backing vocals (4)
- Valerie Simpson – backing vocals (4, 8)
- Phoebe Snow – backing vocals (4), vocals (6)
- The Jessy Dixon Singers – backing vocals (6)
- Chicago Community Choir – backing vocals (10)

== Production ==
- Paul Simon – producer
- Phil Ramone – producer, engineer
- Jerry Masters – engineer (2)
- Glenn Berger – recording
- Bert Szerlip – recording
- John Berg – design
- Anthony Maggiore – design
- Edie Baskin – cover photography

== Charts ==
=== Weekly charts ===
Chart (1975–76)	Position
Australian Kent Music Report Albums Chart	39
Canadian RPM Albums Chart	8
Dutch Mega Albums Chart	11
Finnish Albums Chart	29
Japanese Oricon Albums Chart	18
New Zealand Albums Chart	24
Norwegian Albums Chart	8
Swedish Albums Chart	9
UK Albums Chart	6
United States Billboard Pop Albums	1

=== Year-end charts ===
Chart (1975)	Position
Canadian Albums Chart	82
Chart (1976)	Position
Canadian Albums Chart	64
U.S. Billboard Year-End	14

== Certifications ==
Region	Certification	Certified units/sales
Canada (Music Canada)	Platinum	100,000^{^}
United Kingdom (BPI)	Gold	100,000^{^}
United States (RIAA)	Gold	500,000^{^}
^{^} Shipments figures based on certification alone.
