= Hey Jude (Wilson Pickett album) =

Studio album by Wilson Pickett
- Released: February 1969
- Recorded: November 1968
- Studio: FAME (Muscle Shoals, Alabama)
- Genre: R&B; Southern soul; Southern rock
- Length: 31:08
- Label: Atlantic
- Producer: Rick Hall, Tom Dowd

Wilson Pickett chronology
The Midnight Mover (1968)	Hey Jude (1969)	Right On (1970)

Professional ratings
Review scores
Source	Rating
AllMusic	3/5 stars

Hey Jude is the ninth studio album by soul singer Wilson Pickett, recorded at FAME Studios in Muscle Shoals, Alabama, and released in 1969. The title track, a cover of the Beatles song of the same name, was a success, peaking at No. 13 on the Billboard R&B singles chart and No. 23 on the top 200. Also released as a single was a cover of Steppenwolf's "Born to Be Wild", which was less successful.

The album is particularly noteworthy for the early appearance of guitarist Duane Allman, later founder of the Allman Brothers Band, who made some of his first recordings as a sideman on the album. His guitar work on the title track is credited as what first drew Eric Clapton to him, who two years later invited Allman to join him as part of Derek and the Dominos. Allman's performance on the album also compelled Atlantic Records executive Jerry Wexler to buy out his recording contract and use him in further Atlantic recording sessions, beginning his prolific career as a session musician. Pickett is also backed by members of the Muscle Shoals Rhythm Section on the album. Rhythm Section member Jimmy Johnson later credited Allman's performance on this album as the beginning of Southern Rock.

== Track listing ==
1. "Save Me" (George Jackson, Dan Greer) – 2:37
2. "Hey Jude" (John Lennon, Paul McCartney) – 4:07
3. "Back in Your Arms" (Larry Chambers, George Jackson, Melvin Leakes, Raymond Moore) – 2:57
4. "Toe Hold" (Isaac Hayes, David Porter) – 2:50
5. "Night Owl" (Don Covay) – 2:22
6. "My Own Style of Loving" (George Jackson, Melvin Leakes, Raymond Moore) – 2:44
7. "A Man and a Half" (Larry Chambers, George Jackson, Melvin Leakes, Raymond Moore) – 2:52
8. "Sit Down and Talk This Over" (Wilson Pickett, Bobby Womack) – 2:21
9. "Search Your Heart" (George Jackson, Raymond Moore) – 2:46
10. "Born to Be Wild" (Mars Bonfire) – 2:46
11. "People Make the World" (Bobby Womack) – 2:46

== Personnel ==
- Wilson Pickett – vocals
- Duane Allman, Jimmy Johnson, Albert S. Lowe, Jr – guitars
- Jerry Jemmott, David Hood – bass guitar
- Barry Beckett – piano
- Marvell Thomas – organ
- Roger Hawkins – drums
- Gene "Bowlegs" Miller, Jack Peck – trumpet
- Joe Arnold, Aaron Varnell – tenor saxophone
- James Mitchell – baritone saxophone
- The Sweet Inspirations – backing vocals

Technical

- Loring Eutemey – sleeve design
- Jim Cummins – cover photography

== Charts ==
Chart (1969)	Peak position
Billboard Pop Albums	97
Billboard Top Soul Albums	15

Singles

Year	Single		
Year	Single	US Pop	US R&B
1969	"Hey Jude"	23	13
1969	"Born to Be Wild"	64	41
