= Wilson Pickett in Philadelphia =

Studio album by Wilson Pickett
- Released: 1970
- Recorded: 1970
- Studio: Sigma Sound, Philadelphia, Pennsylvania
- Genre: Soul
- Length: 26:49
- Label: Atlantic
- Producer: Kenny Gamble and Leon Huff

Wilson Pickett chronology
Hey Jude (1969)	Wilson Pickett in Philadelphia (1970)	Right On (1970)

Professional ratings
Review scores
Source	Rating
AllMusic	4.5/5 stars
Christgau's Record Guide	B+

Wilson Pickett in Philadelphia is an album by singer Wilson Pickett, released in 1970. After cutting many of his earlier albums in the Deep South (Memphis and Muscle Shoals), Pickett headed to Philadelphia to work with Gamble and Huff at Sigma Sound Studios. The album features two of Pickett's most popular singles from the early 1970s, "Engine No. 9" (No. 14 Pop, No. 3 R&B) and "Don't Let the Green Grass Fool You" (No. 17 Pop, No. 2 R&B).

== Track listing ==
1. "Run Joey Run" (Kenny Gamble, Leon Huff) 2:37
2. "Help the Needy" (Bobby Eli) 2:31
3. "Come Right Here" (Victor Drayton, Reginald Turner) 2:35
4. "Bumble Bee (Sting Me)" (Victor Drayton, Bunny Sigler, Reginald Turner) 2:13
5. "Don't Let the Green Grass Fool You" (Jerry Akines, Johnny Bellman; Drayton, Turner) 2:46
6. "Get Me Back on Time, Engine Number 9 (Part I)" (Gamble, Huff) 2:46
7. "Get Me Back on Time, Engine Number 9 (Part II) (Gamble, Huff) 3:37
8. "Days Go By" (Ugene Dozier, Bunny Sigler) 2:24
9. "International Playboy" (Bernard Broomer, Ugene Dozier, Lee Phillips, Bunny Sigler) 2:26
10. "Ain't No Doubt About It" (Kenny Gamble, Leon Huff) 2:19

== Personnel ==
- Wilson Pickett - lead vocals
- Vincent Montana Jr. - vibraphone, percussion
- Ronnie Baker - bass
- Thom Bell - organ
- Earl Young - drums
- Roland Chambers, Bobby Eli, Norman Harris - guitar
- Gene Dozier, Lenny Pakula - keyboards, piano
- Sam Reed & His Horn Section - horns
- Don Renaldo & His String Section - strings

== Charts ==
The album reached number 12 on the soul albums chart in the United States. "Engine Number 9" charted at number 14 on the Billboard Hot 100 and number 3 on the R&B Singles chart. "Don't Let the Green Grass Fool You" charted at number 17 on the Hot 100 and number 2 on the R&B chart.

Chart (1970)	Peak position
Billboard Pop Albums	64
Billboard Top Soul Albums	12

=== Singles ===
Year	Single	Chart positions	
Year	Single	US Pop	US R&B
1970	"Engine Number 9"	14	3
1971	"Don't Let The Green Grass Fool You"	17	2
1973	"International Playboy"	-	30
