= Home Is Where the Heart Is =

Home Is Where the Heart Is may refer to:

- Home Is Where the Heart Is (David Cassidy album), 1976
- Home Is Where the Heart Is (Bobby Womack album), 1976
- Home Is Where the Heart Is (David Grisman album), 1988
- "Home Is Where the Heart Is" (song), a 2013 song by Bliss n Eso
- "Home Is Where The Heart Is", is a song by Elvis Presley from the soundtrack for Kid Galahad, 1962
- "Home Is Where The Heart Is", is a song by Bobby Womack from the album Home Is Where the Heart Is, 1976
- "Home Is Where The Heart Is", is a song by David Grisman from the album Home Is Where the Heart Is, 1988
- "Home Is Where The Heart Is", is a 1977 song by Gladys Knight & the Pips
- "Home Is Where The Heart Is", is a song by Sally Fingerett

== See also ==
- Home Is Where the Hart Is, a 1987 American film starring Leslie Nielsen
- Where the Heart Is (disambiguation)
