= Where the Heart Is =

Where the Heart Is may refer to:

== Film ==
- Where the Heart Is (1990 film), a film starring Dabney Coleman and Uma Thurman
- Where the Heart Is, a 1998 film directed by Robert Guédiguian
- Where the Heart Is (2000 film), a film starring Ashley Judd and Natalie Portman

== Television ==
- Where the Heart Is (American TV series), an American soap opera which ran from 1969 to 1973
- Where the Heart Is (British TV series), a British serial drama which ran from 1997 to 2006
- Where the Heart Is (2008 TV series), a 2008 Malaysian-Singaporean TV drama
- "Where the Heart Is" (Everwood), an episode of Everwood

== Other media ==
- Where the Heart Is (novel), a novel by Billie Letts, basis for the 2000 film
- "Where the Heart Is", a song by Soft Cell from The Art of Falling Apart

== See also ==
- Home Is Where the Heart Is (disambiguation)
