= Take What You Find =

Studio album by Helen Reddy
- Released: June 1980
- Recorded: 1980
- Studios: Muscle Shoals Sound Studio, Sheffield, Alabama, Sound Labs, Nashville, Tennessee
- Length: 31:07
- Label: Capitol
- Producer: Ron Haffkine

Helen Reddy chronology
Reddy (1979)	Take What You Find (1980)	Play Me Out (1981)

Take What You Find is the twelfth studio album by Australian-American pop singer Helen Reddy, released in 1980 by Capitol Records. It was her last album while under contract with the aforementioned record label before signing with MCA Records. Like the previous three—We'll Sing in the Sunshine, Live in London, and Reddy—it failed to sell enough copies to reach Billboard magazine's list of the 200 Top LP's & Tapes of the week in the US but also became her first studio LP that didn't have a single appearing on either the Billboard Hot 100 or the magazine's Easy Listening chart.

== Single ==
The album version of the title song was released in the 7-inch format, and an extended version, which had a running time of 5:01, was printed as a 12-inch single. In his retrospective review of Reddy's 1983 album Imagination, AllMusic's Joe Viglione wrote, "It is interesting how the pop divas of the '70s and '80s took some risks." Olivia Newton-John's 1981 hit song "Physical" was banned by a few conservative radio stations at the time because of the sexually suggestive lyrics, but the view of casual sex that Reddy had already sung about the previous year in "Take What You Find" goes so far as to recommend taking any sexual encounter available, even if it means lowering one's standards:

Instant love keeps it light
Just enough to fill the night
High ideals left behind
Looking for love but you take what you find

== Reception ==
Professional ratings
Review scores
Source	Rating
AllMusic	2/5 stars

Charles Donovan's retrospective review on AllMusic described the new tack Reddy was taking: "In search of a harder rock edge, Reddy employed Dr. Hook producer Ron Haffkine for Take What You Find, but despite tougher material like 'Killer Barracuda,' this was essentially another MOR-focused collection. Whatever artistic development there might have been failed to reverse Reddy's commercial decline." The reviewer for Billboard magazine also noted the different feel of this project. "The sound is funkier and harder-edged than we've come to expect from Reddy, as she tackles such tough topic matter as 'Killer Barracuda'," in which she describes a rather vicious love-'em-and-leave-'em type.

== Track listing ==
Side 1

1. "Take What You Find" (Julie Didier, Casey Kelly) – 3:06
2. "Killer Barracuda" (Kris Kristofferson) – 3:08
3. "A Way with the Ladies" (Dennis Locorriere, Ray Sawyer) – 2:48
4. "Love's Not the Question" (Hazel Smith) – 3:34
5. "Last of the Lovers" (Robert Byrne) – 3:10

Side 2

1. "The One I Sing My Love Songs To" (Wayland Holyfield) – 3:10
2. "Wizard in the Wind" (Andrew Paul) – 3:14
3. "All I Really Need Is You" (Shel Silverstein) – 2:08
4. "Midnight Sunshine" (Shel Silverstein) – 3:08
5. "That Plane" (Dennis Locorriere, Ray Sawyer, Shel Silverstein) – 3:41

== Personnel ==
- Helen Reddy – vocals
- Ron Haffkine – producer; musical director
- Mike Lewis – string and horn arranger
- Shane Keister – string and horn arranger; musician
- Jim Cotton – recording engineer
- Steve Melton – recording engineer
- Chuck Ainlay – assistant engineer
- David Cherry – assistant engineer
- Pat Holt – assistant engineer
- Joe Scaife – assistant engineer
- Mary McLemore – assistant engineer
- Ted Hacker – production coordinator
- Skip McQuinn – production coordinator
- Kevin Horan (Chicago Sun-Times) – photography
- Roy Kohara – art direction
- Phil Shima – design
- Mickey Buckins – musician
- Larry Byrom – musician
- Roger Hawkins – musician
- David Hood – musician
- Clayton Ivey – musician
- Jimmy Johnson – musician
- Mac McAnally – musician
- Randy McCormick – musician
- Rod Smarr – musician
- The Shelly Kurland Strings – strings
- The Nashville Horns – horns
- Sheri Kramer – background vocals
- Lisa Silver – background vocals
- Diane Tidwell – background vocals

- recorded at Muscle Shoals Sound Studio, Sheffield, Alabama, and Sound Lab, Nashville, Tennessee
