= A Night on the Town (Rod Stewart album) =

Studio album by Rod Stewart
- Released: 18 June 1976
- Recorded: December 1975–April 1976
- Studios: Cherokee, Los Angeles; Muscle Shoals, Sheffield; Criteria, Miami; Caribou Ranch, Nederland
- Genre: Rock
- Length: 41:19
- Labels: Riva, Warner Bros.
- Producer: Tom Dowd

Rod Stewart chronology
Atlantic Crossing (1975)	A Night on the Town (1976)	Foot Loose & Fancy Free (1977)

Singles from A Night on the Town
- 1. "Tonight's the Night (Gonna Be Alright)" Released: May 1976 (UK); 2. "The Killing of Georgie (Part I and II)" Released: August 1976 (UK); 3. "The First Cut Is the Deepest / I Don't Want To Talk About It" Released: April 1977

Professional ratings
Review scores
Source	Rating
AllMusic	4.5/5 stars
Christgau's Record Guide	B
Rolling Stone	(favourable)
The Rolling Stone Album Guide	3.5/5 stars

A Night on the Town is Rod Stewart's seventh album, released on June 18th, 1976. The cover art is based on Pierre-Auguste Renoir's painting Bal du moulin de la Galette, with Stewart inserted in the centre in period costume. On 30 June 2009, Rhino reissued the album as a two-disc CD with bonus tracks. A Night on the Town was Stewart's last UK number-one studio album until Time in 2013.

The album is regarded as one of Stewart's finest. "The Killing of Georgie" is one of Stewart's most hard-hitting sets of lyrics, a melancholic tale of a gay friend who is cast out by his family and becomes a sensation in the New York nightlife, only to be murdered by a New Jersey gang during an attempted robbery. Controversial "Tonight's the Night" was a No. 1 hit but was banned by some radio stations due to the very obvious lyrics about sex and loss of virginity. A cover of Cat Stevens' "The First Cut Is the Deepest" was also a success and has since become one of Stewart's signature songs.

== Track listing ==
=== Original release ===
Side one – Slow Side
No.	Title	Writer(s)	Length
1.	"Tonight's the Night (Gonna Be Alright)"	Rod Stewart	3:54
2.	"The First Cut Is the Deepest"	Cat Stevens	4:31
3.	"Fool for You"	Stewart	3:49
4.	"The Killing of Georgie (Part I and II)"	Stewart	6:28

Side two – Fast Side
No.	Title	Writer(s)	Length
1.	"The Balltrap"	Stewart	4:37
2.	"Pretty Flamingo"	Mark Barkan	3:27
3.	"Big Bayou"	Gib Guilbeau	3:54
4.	"The Wild Side of Life"	Arlie Carter, William Warren	5:09
5.	"Trade Winds"	Ralph MacDonald, William Salter	5:16

=== 2009 re-release ===
Disc one
No.	Title	Length
1.	"Tonight's the Night (Gonna Be Alright)"	3:56
2.	"The First Cut Is the Deepest"	4:28
3.	"Fool for You"	3:47
4.	"The Killing of Georgie (Part I and II)"	6:22
5.	"The Balltrap"	4:41
6.	"Pretty Flamingo"	3:32
7.	"Big Bayou"	3:55
8.	"The Wild Side of Life"	5:10
9.	"Trade Winds"	5:28
10.	"Rosie"	3:50

Disc two
No.	Title	Length
1.	"Share" (Studio Outtake)	4:19
2.	"Tonight's the Night (Gonna Be Alright)" (Early version)	3:51
3.	"The First Cut Is the Deepest" (Early version)	3:48
4.	"Fool for You" (Early version)	3:40
5.	"The Killing of Georgie (Part I)" (Early version)	4:22
6.	"The Balltrap" (Early version)	4:40
7.	"Pretty Flamingo" (Early version)	3:26
8.	"Big Bayou" (Early version)	4:13
9.	"The Wild Side of Life" (Early version)	4:47
10.	"Trade Winds" (Early version)	4:44
11.	"Rosie" (Early version)	4:21
12.	"Get Back" (From the soundtrack All This and World War II)	4:05
13.	"The Killing Of Georgie [Part II]" (Alternate Vocals)	3:28
14.	"Tonight's The Night [Gonna Be Alright]" (Spoken Excerpt)	0:44

== Personnel ==
- Rod Stewart – vocals
- Donald Dunn, Bob Glaub, David Hood, Lee Sklar, Willie Weeks – bass guitar
- Pete Carr, Steve Cropper, Jesse Ed Davis, David Lindley, Billy Peek, Fred Tackett, Joe Walsh – guitar
- Barry Beckett, David Foster, John Barlow Jarvis, J. Smith – keyboards
- Roger Hawkins, Al Jackson Jr., Andy Newmark, Rick Shlosser – drums
- Joe Lala, Tommy Vig – percussion
- Jimmy Horowitz, Mel Lewis, Arif Mardin – string arrangements
- Tower of Power horn section – French horn
- Plas Johnson, Jerry Jumonville – tenor saxophone

== Charts ==
=== Weekly charts ===
Chart (1976–77)	Peak position
Australian Albums (Kent Music Report)	1
Canada Top Albums/CDs (RPM)	1
Dutch Albums (Album Top 100)	5
Finnish Albums (The Official Finnish Charts)	29
German Albums (Offizielle Top 100)	29
Japanese Albums (Oricon)	23
New Zealand Albums (RMNZ)	1
Norwegian Albums (VG-lista)	1
Swedish Albums (Sverigetopplistan)	1
UK Albums (Official Charts)	1
US Billboard 200	2

=== Year-end charts ===
Chart (1976)	Peak position
Australia Albums (Kent Music Report)	2
Canada Top Albums/CDs (RPM)	11
Dutch Albums (Album Top 100)	46
New Zealand Albums (RMNZ)	2
UK Albums (OCC)	5

Chart (1977)	Peak position
Australia Albums (Kent Music Report)	14
New Zealand Albums (RMNZ)	3
US Billboard 200	31

== Certifications ==
Region	Certification	Certified units/sales
Australia (ARIA)	6× Platinum	420,000^{^}
Canada (Music Canada)	2× Platinum	200,000^{^}
Sweden (GLF)	Gold	50,000
United Kingdom (BPI)	Platinum	1,000,000
United States (RIAA)	2× Platinum	2,000,000^{^}
^{^} Shipments figures based on certification alone.
