= BW Goes C&W =

Studio album by Bobby Womack
- Released: June 11, 1976
- Genre: Soul, country, country soul
- Length: 27:38
- Label: United Artists
- Producer: Bobby Womack

Bobby Womack chronology
Safety Zone (1975)	BW Goes C&W (1976)	Home Is Where the Heart Is (1976)

Professional ratings
Review scores
Source	Rating
AllMusic	1/5 stars
The Encyclopedia of Popular Music	2/5 stars

BW Goes C&W is the ninth studio album by American singer-songwriter Bobby Womack. The album was released on June 11, 1976, by United Artists Records. The album was released amid growing tensions between Womack and United Artists Records, who strongly opposed Womack releasing a country album at a time when many soul artists were moving towards glossier R&B and disco. United Artists relented and allowed the album's release after Womack agreed not to use the original title Step Aside, Charley Pride, Give Another Nigger a Try. Poor sales and negative critical reception resulted in Womack leaving United Artists for Columbia Records.

== Track listing ==
No.	Title	Writer(s)	Length
1.	"Don't Make This the Last Date"	Cecil Womack	3:12
2.	"Behind Closed Doors"	Kenny O'Dell	2:32
3.	"Bouquet of Roses"	music: Steve Nelson; lyrics: Bob Hilliard	2:43
4.	"Tired of Living in the Country"	Sam Cooke	2:01
5.	"Tarnished Rings"	Roger Dollarhide	2:39
6.	"Big Bayou"	Gib Guilbeau	2:50
7.	"Song of the Mockingbird"	David Lovelace, Greg Attaway	3:10
8.	"I'd Be Ahead If I Could Quit While I'm Behind"	Jim Ford	2:34
9.	"You"	D. Warner	2:40
10.	"I Take It On Home"	Kenny O'Dell	3:17

== Personnel ==
- Bobby Womack - vocals, guitar, primary artist
