= Atlantic Crossing =

Studio album by Rod Stewart
- Released: 15 August 1975
- Recorded: April–June 1975
- Studios: A&R (New York); Criteria (Miami); Wally Heider's Studio 3 (Hollywood); Hi Recording; Muscle Shoals (Alabama)
- Genre: Pop rock
- Length: 44:27
- Labels: Riva; Warner Bros.
- Producer: Tom Dowd

Rod Stewart chronology
Smiler (1974)	Atlantic Crossing (1975)	A Night on the Town (1976)

Singles from Atlantic Crossing
- 1. "Sailing" Released: 8 August 1975 (UK); 2. "This Old Heart of Mine" Released: November 1975 (UK)

Atlantic Crossing is the sixth solo album by Rod Stewart. Released on 15 August 1975, and recorded in five American studios including Muscle Shoals, Alabama, between April and June 1975, it was produced by Tom Dowd, and peaked at number one in the UK (his fourth solo album to do so), and number nine on the Billboard Top Pop Albums chart. The album was divided into a fast side and a slow side, apparently at the suggestion of Stewart's then-girlfriend, Swedish actress Britt Ekland. Stewart would repeat the format for his next two albums. The album contained two of Stewart's most popular songs, "Sailing" and "I Don't Want to Talk About It”, and classic rock favourites "Three Time Loser" and "Stone Cold Sober". The album was the 14th of Stewart's career, starting with Jeff Beck's Truth in 1968, and his sixth solo.

== Recording ==
The album was recorded in five different American studios: A&R (New York), Criteria (Miami), Wally Heider's Studio 3 (Hollywood), Hi Recording Studio (Memphis), and Muscle Shoals (Alabama) between April and June 1975, and produced by Tom Dowd, who had been the engineer or producer for many of Stewart's heroes during Dowd's time at Atlantic Records.

With Atlantic Crossing, Stewart ended his association with Ronnie Wood, Ian McLagan and the stable of musicians who had been his core collaborators on his classic run of albums for Mercury Records, fusing soul and folk. Instead, he used a group of session musicians, including The Memphis Horns and Booker T. and the MG's. The only song performed from this album on The Faces' final US tour in autumn 1975 was "Three Time Loser", and the rest of the group heavily disliked Stewart's change in musical direction on this album. Following the success of the album, and his move to the U.S., Stewart announced his exit from the Faces by the end of the year.

== Release ==
"Sailing" was a number one hit in the UK in September 1975, and returned to the UK Top 3 a year later when it was used as the theme for the BBC series Sailor; both acoustic and electric guitars in the song were played by Pete Carr. In 1977, almost two years after the album was released, Stewart scored another UK number one from the album with the double A-side single "I Don't Want to Talk About It" and "The First Cut Is the Deepest" (from the album A Night on the Town - 1976).

In 2009, Rhino Records released a two-disc version of the album with bonus tracks.

== Reception ==
Professional ratings
Review scores
Source	Rating
AllMusic	4.5/5 stars
Christgau's Record Guide	B+
Rolling Stone	(average)
The Rolling Stone Album Guide	3/5 stars

== Track listing ==
Fast Side (Side One)

1. "Three Time Loser" (Rod Stewart) – 4:03
2. "Alright for an Hour" (Stewart, Jesse Ed Davis) – 4:17
3. "All in the Name of Rock 'N' Roll" (Stewart) – 5:02
4. "Drift Away" (Mentor Williams) – 3:43
5. "Stone Cold Sober" (Stewart, Steve Cropper) – 4:12

Slow Side (Side Two)

1. "I Don't Want to Talk About It" (Danny Whitten) – 4:47
2. "It's Not the Spotlight" (Barry Goldberg, Gerry Goffin) – 4:21
3. "This Old Heart of Mine" (Lamont Dozier, Brian Holland, Eddie Holland, Sylvia Moy) – 4:04
4. "Still Love You" (Stewart) – 5:08
5. "Sailing" (Gavin Sutherland) – 4:37

=== 2009 two disc re-release ===
Disc one

Track 1 – 10 features the original album.

11. "Skye Boat Song (The Atlantic Crossing Drum & Pipe Band)" (Harold Boulton, Annie MacLeod) 4:13

Disc two

1. "To Love Somebody" (with Booker T. & The MG's) (Barry Gibb, Robin Gibb) – 4:12
2. "Holy Cow" (with Booker T. & The MG's) (Allen Toussaint) – 3:16
3. "Return to Sender" (with Booker T. & The MG's) (Otis Blackwell, Scott Winfield) – 3:42
4. "Three Time Loser" [Alternate Version] (Stewart) – 4:40
5. "Alright for an Hour" [Alternate Version] (Stewart, Davis) – 4:36
6. "All in the Name of Rock 'n' Roll" [Alternate Version] (Stewart) – 5:00
7. "Drift Away" [Alternate Version] (Williams) – 3:58
8. "Too Much Noise" [Early Version of "Stone Cold Sober"] (Stewart, Cropper) – 3:24
9. "I Don't Want to Talk About It" [Alternate Version] (Whitten) – 4:56
10. "It's Not the Spotlight" [Alternate Version] (Goldberg, Goffin) – 4:27
11. "This Old Heart of Mine" [Alternate Version] (with Booker T. & The MG's) (Holland-Dozier-Holland, Moy) – 3:54
12. "Still Love You" [Alternate Version] (Stewart) 4:57
13. "Sailing" [Alternate Version] (Sutherland) 4:39
14. "Skye Boat Song (The Atlantic Crossing Drum & Pipe Band)" [Alternate Version] (Boulton, MacLeod) 4:20

== Personnel ==
- Rod Stewart – vocals
- Pete Carr – acoustic guitar and electric guitar on Sailing
- Steve Cropper, Jesse Ed Davis, Fred Tackett, Jimmy Johnson – guitar
- Barry Beckett, Albhy Galuten – keyboards
- Booker T. Jones – Hammond organ
- Donald Dunn, Bob Glaub, David Hood, Lee Sklar – bass guitar
- David Lindley – mandolin, violin
- Willie Correa, Roger Hawkins, Al Jackson Jr., Nigel Olsson – drums, percussion
- The Memphis Horns – trumpet, trombone, saxophone
- Cindy & Bob Singers, The Pets & The Clappers – backing vocals

String arrangements by Arif Mardin and James Mitchell

Album design and art direction by John Kosh; illustration by Peter Lloyd

== Charts ==
=== Weekly charts ===
Chart (1975-78)	Peak position
Australian Albums (Kent Music Report)	1
Canada Top Albums/CDs (RPM)	21
Dutch Albums (Album Top 100)	2
Finnish Albums (The Official Finnish Charts)	10
German Albums (Offizielle Top 100)	11
Italian Albums (Musica e Dischi)	23
Japanese Albums (Oricon)	87
New Zealand Albums (RMNZ)	2
Norwegian Albums (VG-lista)	1
Spanish Albums (AFYVE)	18
Swedish Albums (Sverigetopplistan)	5
UK Albums (Official Charts)	1
US Billboard 200	9

=== Year-end charts ===
Chart (1975)	Peak position
Australian Albums (Kent Music Report)	11
Dutch Albums (Album Top 100)	15
New Zealand Albums (RMNZ)	2
UK Albums (OCC)	3

Chart (1976)	Peak position
Australian Albums (Kent Music Report)	17
German Albums (Offizielle Top 100)	39
New Zealand Albums (RMNZ)	12
UK Albums (OCC)	22

Chart (1977)	Peak position
New Zealand Albums (RMNZ)	6

Chart (1978)	Peak position
New Zealand Albums (RMNZ)	30

== Certifications ==
Region	Certification	Certified units/sales
Australia (ARIA)	4× Platinum	400,000
Germany (BVMI)	Gold	250,000^{^}
Hong Kong (IFPI Hong Kong)	Gold	10,000^{*}
Sweden (GLF)	Gold	200,000
United Kingdom (BPI)	Platinum	300,000^{^}
United States (RIAA)	Gold	500,000^{^}
^{*} Sales figures based on certification alone.^{^} Shipments figures based on certification alone.
