= Pete Carr =

American guitarist and record producer (1950–2020)

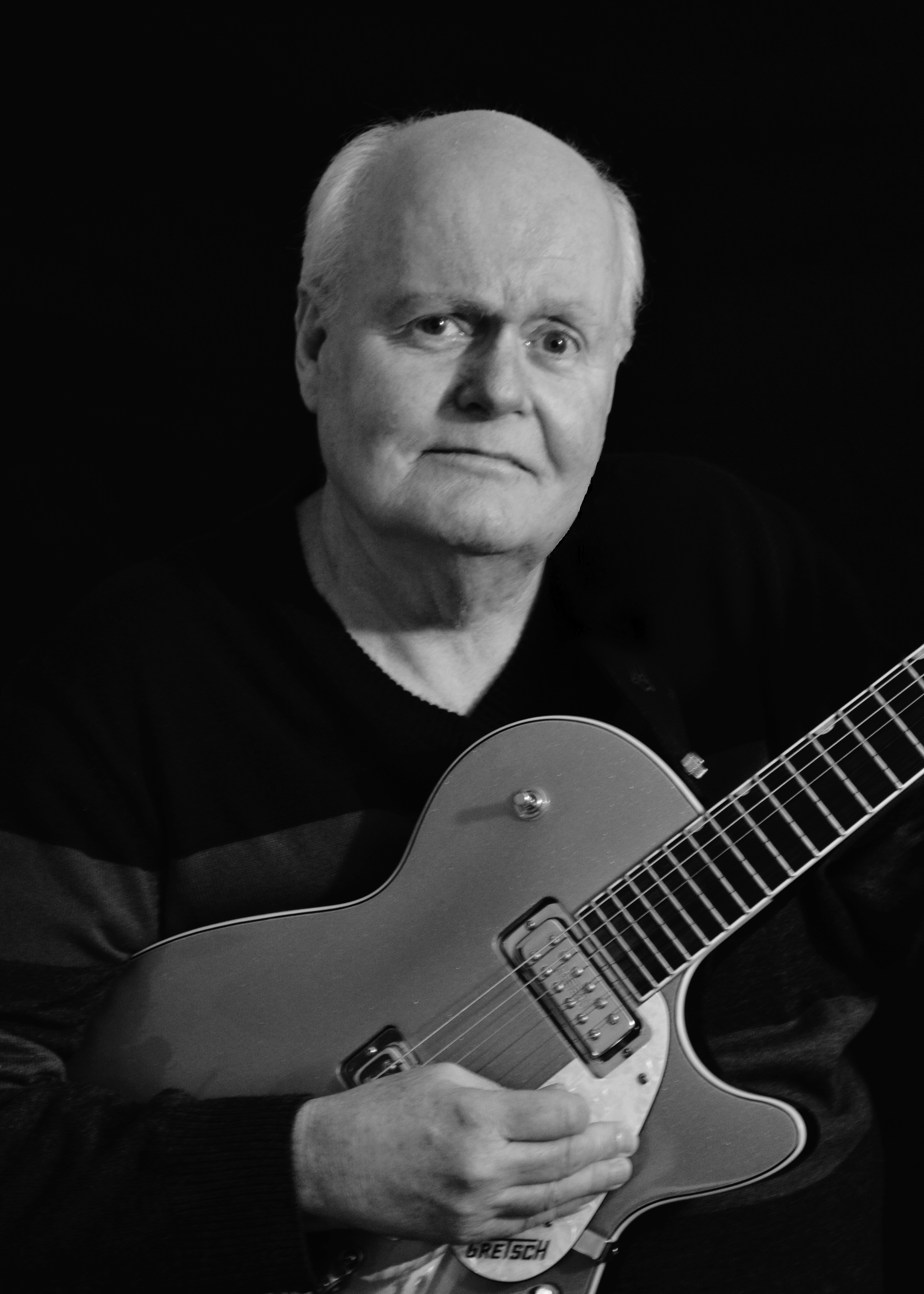
- Carr in 2014

Background information
- Born: Jesse Willard Carr; April 22, 1950; Daytona Beach, Florida, U.S.
- Died: June 27, 2020 (aged 70) Florence, Alabama, U.S.
- Occupations: Musician, songwriter, record producer
- Years active: 1965–2020
- Formerly of: LeBlanc and Carr, Hour Glass, Muscle Shoals Rhythm Section, Bob Seger, Rod Stewart, Simon and Garfunkel

Jesse Willard "Pete" Carr (April 22, 1950 – June 27, 2020) was an American guitarist. Carr contributed session work to recordings by Joan Baez, Luther Ingram, Bob Seger, Paul Simon, Willie Nelson, Joe Cocker, Boz Scaggs, Percy Sledge, The Staple Singers, Rod Stewart, Barbra Streisand, Wilson Pickett, Hank Williams, Jr., and many others, from the 1970s onward.

Carr recorded and produced four solo albums and was half of the duet LeBlanc and Carr. He recorded extensively at FAME Recording Studio in Muscle Shoals, Alabama and Muscle Shoals Sound Studio in Sheffield, Alabama. He was lead guitarist for the famed Muscle Shoals Rhythm Section. Carr was known for versatility, using both electric and acoustic guitars to perform a vast array of musical styles including folk, rock, pop, country, blues and soul.

In addition, Carr added depth to his understanding of the recording studio environment by engineering and producing numerous albums over the years which has led to several Grammy nominations. In 1974, Paul Simon's There Goes Rhymin' Simon album was nominated for two Grammy Awards; and Against the Wind by Bob Seger earned two Grammys in 1981. In addition, Carr co-produced Seger's Stranger in Town album which featured the hit "Old Time Rock and Roll".

== Early life ==
Carr was born in Daytona Beach, Florida and started to play the guitar at age 13. The Beatles and the Rolling Stones were major influences on his early interest in music. Carr later became interested in guitar instrumentals such as "Walk, Don't Run" by The Ventures, which he learned note for note by listening to the record. Around this time a guitar player from Memphis, Travis Wammack, released an instrumental guitar record named "Scratchy". The other side of the record was named "Fire Fly". When Carr heard "Scratchy" on the radio he was so impressed he immediately went out and bought the record. Carr also learned from listening to guitarists such as James Burton, Jeff Beck, Eric Clapton, Duane Allman, Ted Connors, and Chet Atkins.

At the age of 15, Carr went to see the Allman Joys play at the Club Martinique in Daytona Beach. Carr, with guitar case in hand, introduced himself when the band took a break and asked Gregg Allman to show him some guitar lines. Gregg replied, "That's my brother, Duane's, department." At that point Carr introduced himself to Duane Allman. That meeting began a friendship which lasted until Allman's tragic death in a motorcycle crash October 29, 1971.

In 1968, Carr, Gregg Allman, Duane Allman, Paul Hornsby, and Johnny Sandlin, in a group named Hour Glass, played together on the Power of Love album. Also in 1968, Hour Glass recorded songs in Muscle Shoals, Alabama, at Rick Hall's FAME Studios which was known for innovative productions and great sound. One song recording at FAME, "Sweet Little Angel", was later released in a Duane Allman Anthology set.

== Session work ==
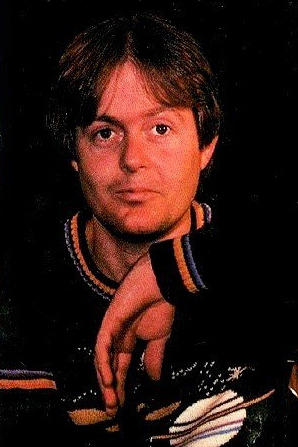
Carr during his studio years

Carr found that he preferred session work in recording studios along with the engineering and producing aspects of music, so he moved to Muscle Shoals, Alabama, around the age of 20 to pursue a studio career. Johnny Wyker and Court Pickett would soon start work on their Motorcycle Mama album under the name of "Sailcat". Carr contributed as musician, engineer, and producer on this project. The album was a commercial success for the new Muscle Shoals producer; afterward, Carr replaced Eddie Hinton as lead guitarist for the Muscle Shoals Rhythm Section.

The 1970s were among the most productive of the Muscle Shoals Rhythm Section as the cream of rock, pop, and soul found their way to 3614 Jackson Highway in Sheffield, Alabama. Carr played on almost all sessions recorded at the studio for the next 10 years. A good example of Carr's musical ability and taste is the standout guitar lines he played on the Bob Seger hit "Mainstreet". The Rhythm Section (including Carr) co-produced Paul Simon's There Goes Rhymin' Simon which earned them a Grammy nomination in 1974.

Carr continued as the premier session guitarist in the Muscle Shoals area playing on projects for artists recording at the main studios and also produced two guitar instrumental albums himself. It strengthened Carr's reputation as one of the South's best studio session guitarists, as well as an artist in his own right. Jerry Wexler, a world-renowned record executive and producer, helped Carr find a record label for his productions. Carr put together a group with Lenny LeBlanc, LeBlanc & Carr, and created the album Midnight Light as both artist and producer. The song "Falling" became a big hit for them. "Falling" was mixed at FAME Studios which is where Carr did most of the mixing for his production projects. The group's first tour was with Lynyrd Skynyrd on their Street Survivors Tour which ended tragically with an airplane crash in Mississippi on October 20, 1977. After this tragedy, and other band problems, Carr decided to return to the studio.

Pete Carr had distinguished himself as the only studio musician in the Muscle Shoals area to succeed as studio musician, artist, composer, engineer, and producer. Tom Dowd called Carr to Los Angeles to play on a Rod Stewart album which produced the big hit "Tonight's The Night". Carr's guitar playing was a prominent part of the hit. He layered rhythm and lead guitars throughout the song. In 1981 Carr was chosen to play for the Simon and Garfunkel Reunion World Tour and the HBO Central Park Concert on September 19, 1981, where he played acoustic and electric guitar. Over half a million people were in attendance for the concert.

Rolling Stone magazine gave Carr a rave review for his bluesy and tasty electric guitar solo on the Barbra Streisand song "Make it Like a Memory" from her Grammy award-winning album Guilty. It was the biggest selling album in Streisand's career. On the song "Woman in Love" from the same album, Carr's opening harmony guitar lines were notably unique and hard to categorize but effective in introducing the Streisand hit.

Carr's contribution to American music continues to be heard daily around the globe. Songs featuring Carr's lead guitar such as Bob Seger's "Mainstreet" and Paul Simon's "Kodachrome" are standards. During the Falklands War of 1982, as British battle ships set sail to reclaim the Islands the BBC (The British Broadcasting Corporation) played the Rod Stewart song "Sailing" nationwide. "Sailing" featured Carr's acoustic and electric guitar playing.

== Personal Discography ==
- Not A Word On It (1976)
- Multiple Flash (1978)
- Play That Guitar (2008)
- Pete Carr Unreleased (2022, posthumously)

== Collaborations ==
With Barbra Streisand

- Guilty (Columbia Records, 1980)

With Paul Simon

- There Goes Rhymin' Simon (Columbia Records, 1973)
- Still Crazy After All These Years (Columbia Records, 1975)

With Joan Baez

- Honest Lullaby (Portrait Records, 1979)

With Willie Nelson

- Phases and Stages (Atlantic Records, 1974)

With Dee Dee Bridgewater

- Dee Dee Bridgewater (Atlantic Records, 1976)

With Cat Stevens

- Izitso (A&M Records, 1977)

With Donovan

- Lady of the Stars (RCA Records, 1984)

With Mary MacGregor

- Torn Between Two Lovers (Ariola Records, 1976)

With Paul Anka

- Feelings (United Artists Records, 1975)

With Livingston Taylor

- Livingston Taylor (Atco Records, 1970)

With Art Garfunkel

- Breakaway (Columbia Records, 1975)
- Watermark (Columbia Records, 1977)
- Scissors Cut (Columbia Records, 1981)

With Rod Stewart

- Atlantic Crossing (Warner Bros. Records, 1975)
- A Night on the Town (Warner Bros. Records, 1976)

With Joe Cocker

- Luxury You Can Afford (Asylum Records, 1978)

With Gail Davies

- The Game (Warner Bros. Records, 1980)
- Givin' Herself Away (Warner Bros. Records, 1982)

With Kim Carnes

- Sailin' (A&M Records, 1976)

With Levon Helm

- Levon Helm (Capitol Records, 1982)

With Johnny Rivers

- The Road (Atlantic Records, 1974)

With Mavis Staples

- Oh What a Feeling (Warner Bros. Records, 1979)

With Bob Seger

- Back in '72 (Reprise Records, 1973)
- Beautiful Loser (Capitol Records, 1975)
- Night Moves (Capitol Records, 1976)
- Stranger in Town (Capitol Records, 1978)
- Against the Wind (Capitol Records, 1980)
- The Distance (Capitol Records, 1982)
- Like a Rock (Capitol Records, 1986)

With Candi Staton

- Candi (Warner Bros. Records, 1974)

With Boz Scaggs

- My Time (Columbia Records, 1972)

With José Feliciano

- Sweet Soul Music (Private Stock Records, 1976)

With Wendy Waldman

- Gypsy Symphony (Warner Bros. Records, 1974)

== Awards and achievements ==
- 2023 Inductee into the Alabama Music Hall of Fame.
- 2020 Inductee into the Florida Music Hall of Fame.
- 2019 Inductee into the Southern Rock Hall of Fame.
- 2008 Inductee into the Musicians Hall of Fame in Nashville, TN
- 2005 Alabama Music Hall of Fame Achiever (Studio Musician Award)
- "Falling" - Named BMI Millionaire song (one million or more radio plays)
- "Falling" - Named one of Billboard's all-time favorite Top 40 Hits

== Award-winning recordings on which Pete Carr played ==
Billboard #1 Singles:

- "If Loving You is Wrong" (1972) by Luther Ingram (R&B)
- "Tonight's the Night" (1976–1977) by Rod Stewart
- "Torn Between Two Lovers" (1977) by Mary MacGregor
- "Woman in Love" (1980) by Barbra Streisand.
- "What Kind of Fool" (1981) by Barbra Streisand.

Billboard #1 Albums:

- Still Crazy After All These Years (1975) by Paul Simon
- Against the Wind (1980) by Bob Seger
- Guilty (1980) by Barbra Streisand

Grammy Award Winning Albums:

- Still Crazy After All These Years (1976) by Paul Simon
- Against the Wind (1980) by Bob Seger (co-producer and guitar)
- Guilty (1981) by Barbra Streisand

Grammy Nominated Albums:

- There Goes Rhymin' Simon (1974) by Paul Simon (co-producer and guitar)
- Still Crazy After All These Years (1976) by Paul Simon
- Against the Wind (1980) by Bob Seger (co-producer and guitar)
- Guilty (1981) by Barbra Streisand

Grammy Nominated Record of the Year:

- "Woman in Love" (1981) by Barbra Streisand

== Personal life ==
Carr resided in Florence, Alabama, with his wife, Charlotte Price Carr. His one child, John A. Carr, is a professor at the University of North Alabama. Pete Carr died on June 27, 2020, at the age of 70.
