= Home Is Where the Heart Is (Bobby Womack album) =

Studio album by Bobby Womack
- Released: 1977
- Recorded: 1976
- Genre: R&B
- Length: 33:55
- Label: Columbia
- Producer: Bobby Womack

Bobby Womack chronology
BW Goes C&W (1976)	Home Is Where the Heart Is (1977)	Pieces (1978)

Professional ratings
Review scores
Source	Rating
AllMusic	3/5 stars
The Encyclopedia of Popular Music	2/5 stars

Home Is Where the Heart Is is the tenth studio album by American singer-songwriter Bobby Womack. The album was released in 1977, by Columbia Records.

== Track listing ==
No.	Title	Writer(s)	Length
1.	"Home Is Where the Heart Is"	Phillip Mitchell	3:20
2.	"Just a Little Bit Salty"	Eddie Hinton	3:18
3.	"Standing in the Safety Zone"	Bobby Womack, Harold Payne	5:14
4.	"One More Chance on Love"	Bobby Womack, Harold Payne	6:38
5.	"How Long (Has This Been Goin' On)"	Paul Carrack	2:52
6.	"I Could Never Be Satisfied"	Henry Bush, Sir Mack Rice	2:22
7.	"Something for My Head"	Phillip Mitchell	3:00
8.	"A Change Is Gonna Come"	Sam Cooke	3:12
9.	"We've Only Just Begun"	Paul Williams, Roger Nichols	3:59

== Personnel ==
- Bobby Womack - lead and rhythm guitar, vocals
- Charles Fullilove - lead guitar
- Jimmy Johnson - rhythm guitar
- Eddie Hinton - acoustic guitar on "A Little Bit Salty"
- Wayne Perkins - lead guitar on "One More Chance On Love" and "We've Only Just Begun"
- David Hood - bass
- Barry Beckett - keyboards
- Sonny Burke - keyboards on "One More Chance On Love"
- Roger Hawkins - drums, percussion
- Tom Roady - percussion
- Dashilell Humdy, Harvey Thompson - tenor saxophone
- Ronald Eades - baritone saxophone
- Alan Deville, Ben Culley, Harrison Calloway, Lester Smith - trumpet
- Dale Quillen, Zaimos Rowan - trombone
- Bruce Sundano, Cassietta George, Cecil Womack, Curtis Womack, Eddie Hokensen, Edwiges Gonzales, Friendly Womack, Jr., Joe Esposito, Josephine Howard, Peggy Young, The Valentinos - backing vocals

Technical

- Carrot Faye, Gregg Hamm, Roger Dollarhide, Steve Melton, Bob "Inky" Incorvaia, Jerry Masters - engineer
- Kenneth McGowan - photography
