= Right On (Wilson Pickett album) =

Studio album by Wilson Pickett
- Released: 1970
- Recorded: Late 1969
- Studio: Criteria, Miami, Florida
- Genre: R&B, soul
- Length: 38:14
- Label: Atlantic
- Producer: Dave Crawford, Jerry Wexler, Rick Hall, Tom Dowd

Wilson Pickett chronology
Wilson Pickett in Philadelphia (1970)	Right On (1970)	Don't Knock My Love (1972)

Professional ratings
Review scores
Source	Rating
AllMusic	3/5 stars
Christgau's Record Guide	B

Right On is an album by R&B and soul singer Wilson Pickett, released in 1970. Hit covers of the Supremes' "You Keep Me Hangin' On" (No. 16 R&B, No. 92 Pop) and the Archies' "Sugar, Sugar" (No. 4 R&B, No. 25 Pop), as well as the Pickett original "She Said Yes" (No. 20 R&B, No. 68 Pop) came from these sessions. The album, however, had dismal sales, staying in the bottom parts of the Billboard 200.

The backing band was Cold Grits; consisting of keyboardist Billy Carter, bassist Harold Cowart, guitarist Jimmy O'Rourke and drummer Ron "Tubby" Ziegler; and the Muscle Shoals Rhythm Section.

== Track listing ==
1. "Groovy Little Woman" (Ernest Smith, Pickett) 2:38
2. "Funky Way" (Pickett, Dave Crawford) 2:29
3. "Sugar, Sugar" (Jeff Barry, Andy Kim) 2:56
4. "Sweet Inspiration" (Dan Penn, Spooner Oldham) 2:53
5. "This Old Town" (William R. Stevenson, Don Covay, Pickett) 3:23
6. "You Keep Me Hangin' On" (Holland, Dozier, Holland) 4:54
7. "Lord, Pity Us All" (Mac Rebennack) 3:19
8. "It's Still Good" (Jerry Williams Jr., Gary U.S. Bonds) 2:36
9. "Woman Likes To Hear That" (George Jackson) 2:51
10. "She Said Yes" (Pickett, William R. Stevenson, Don Covay, Johnny Nash) 3:13
11. "Hey Joe" (Billy Roberts) 3:03
12. "Steal Away" (Traditional; arranged by Tom Dowd) 3:50

== Personnel ==
- Wilson Pickett – vocals
- Eddie Hinton – lead guitar
- Jimmy O'Rourke – guitar
- Jimmy Johnson – rhythm guitar
- David Hood, Harold Cowart – bass guitar
- Barry Beckett, Billy Carter – keyboards
- Roger Hawkins, Ron "Tubby" Zeigler – drums
- Cissy Houston, Jackie Verdell, John Utley, Judy Clay – backing vocals

Technical

- Chuck Kirkpatrick, Jerome Gasper, Lew Hahn, Ron Albert – engineer
- Haig Adishian – cover design
- Jim Cummins, Stephen Paley – photography

== Charts ==
Chart (1970)	Peak position
Billboard Pop Albums	197
Billboard Top Soul Albums	36

=== Singles ===
Year	Single	Chart positions	
Year	Single	US Pop	US R&B
1969	"You Keep Me Hangin' On"	92	16
1970	"Sugar, Sugar"	25	4
1970	"She Said Yes"	68	20
