= Chastity (1969 film) =

Film by Alessio de Paola

- Theatrical release poster
- Directed by: Alessio de Paola
- Written by: Sonny Bono
- Produced by: Sonny Bono
- Starring: Cher; Barbara London; Stephen Whittaker
- Cinematography: Ben Colman
- Edited by: Hugo Grimaldi
- Music by: Sonny Bono
- Production company: Progress Motion Pictures
- Distributed by: American International Pictures
- Release date: June 24, 1969
- Running time: 83 minutes
- Country: United States
- Language: English

Chastity is a 1969 American romance drama film directed by Alessio de Paola and starring American singer-actress Cher, in her first film role without her then-husband Sonny Bono. Written and produced as a star vehicle for her by Sonny Bono, it was a box-office failure and deterred her from acting in films for more than a decade.

== Plot ==
Chastity (Cher) is a young hippie runaway who drifts and hitchhikes aimlessly, reflecting on life and love. She survives by her wits, engaging in occasional scams (such as pretending to be a gas station attendant and keeping customers' payments) and accepting offers of rides, food, and lodging from men she meets, but firmly and coldly rejecting any sexual advances that come with these offers. Sometimes she is childlike, other times she is angry or destructive for seemingly no reason. She chose the name "Chastity" for herself from the dictionary because it meant "abstinence, purity, freedom from ornamentation, simplicity".

Chastity meets a law student named Eddie (Stephen Whittaker) who is kind to her, and briefly stays with him at his house. Next she crosses the border into Mexico and ends up in a brothel run by lesbian madam Diana Midnight (Barbara London). After Chastity rips off an inexperienced young male customer, Diana takes a personal interest in her and the two begin a brief romantic relationship. At first, Chastity seems happy with Diana, despite Chastity's expressed hatred of being touched. But Chastity soon becomes angry with Diana, leaves, and returns to Eddie, whom she renames "Andre".

Eddie and Chastity live together for a short time and Chastity seems to finally be settled in a traditional relationship. But while Eddie is out, Chastity begins to hear in her head the voices of her parents talking about how she was sexually abused when she was younger (providing the motivation for Chastity's behavior). Crying and traumatized, Chastity overturns the dining-room table, writes "I think I love you" on Eddie's kitchen wall, and runs away again, heading for the highway. A truck driver pulls up to offer her a lift, but Chastity hesitates about getting in. The film ends without showing whether she accepts the ride.

== Cast ==
- Cher as Chastity
- Barbara London as Diana Midnight
- Stephen Whittaker as Eddie (aka Andre)
- Tom Nolan as Tommy
- Danny Zapien as Pimp
- Elmer Valentine as First Truck Driver
- Burke Rhind as Salesman
- Richard Armstrong as Husband
- Autumn as Prostitute
- Joe Light as Master of Ceremonies
- Dolly Hunt as Lady in Church
- Jason Clark as Second Truck Driver (as Jason Clarke)

== Production notes ==
By 1968, the duo of Sonny & Cher were losing popularity, partly because young people disagreed with the duo's anti-drug stance and associated them and their music with an older, more conservative generation. The film Chastity was planned to reconnect with the younger audience, make Cher a major movie star, and establish Sonny in the film business. Sonny stated that the film was about "the increase in frigidity and the increase in lesbianism...the lack of manhood. The independence women have acquired but don't necessarily want. So many young girls are just spinning their wheels."

The Bonos invested $500,000 of their own money into the film, even pawning the furniture from their Bel Air mansion to raise funds. When Chastity failed at the box office, the couple lost their investment and ended up owing the U.S. government $270,000 in taxes. Although the movie overall received poor notices, Cher did receive some positive reviews for her acting.

A soundtrack to the film was also released, consisting almost entirely of instrumentals except for one song sung by Cher and produced by Sonny, "Chastity's Song (Band of Thieves)" which was also released as a single. The single and soundtrack LP were also commercial failures, and contributed to ATCO Records' decision that Cher work with a different producer on her next solo album, 3614 Jackson Highway.

Filmed in the city of Phoenix, Arizona, in the latter half of 1968, locations in the city still exist over 50 years later. Early in the film, 'Chastity' is hit on by a man in a car, in front of "Macayo's", a Mexican-food establishment. Another scene has her leaving St. Mary's, a church in the downtown area. Outdoor scenes for Mexico were filmed in Phoenix's Encanto Park; in another scene she walks along 35th Avenue and in the distance is Camelback Mountain, which today cannot be seen from this locale.

Sonny and Cher conceived their child Chaz Bono during the making of the film.
