= Chastity (soundtrack) =

Chastity - The Motion Picture Music Soundtrack

Soundtrack album by Cher
- Released: June 20, 1969
- Recorded: 1969
- Genre: Pop
- Length: 28:10
- Label: Atco
- Producer: Sonny Bono

Cher chronology
3614 Jackson Highway (1969)	Chastity (1969)	Chér (1971)

Singles from Chastity Motion Picture
- 1. "Chastity's Song (Band of Thieves)" Released: June 2, 1969

Chastity is the first soundtrack album featuring American singer-actress Cher, released on June 20, 1969 by Atco. It was released to promote and accompany the 1969 motion picture, Chastity. The album, like the film from which it came, was a commercial failure.

== Album information ==
The Chastity album was released in the summer of 1969, the same date as Cher's album 3614 Jackson Highway, and was written and produced by Sonny Bono. The soundtrack is largely instrumental, with vocals by Cher on the track "Chastity's Song (Band of Thieves)" (the only song on the album written by Elyse Weinberg). This song was also released as a single, with "I Walk on Guilded Splinters" as the B-side. In a review of the song, Billboard wrote that Cher delivered a "sensitive treatment" and that the single had "both play and sales potential".

The St. Petersburg Times considered "Chastity's Song", "Chastity Walk" and "Chastity Love Theme" highlights in its review of the album.

== Track listing ==
All tracks written by Sonny Bono except "Chastity's Song (Band of Thieves)" by Elyse J. Weinberg.

Side one
No.	Title	Length
1.	"Chastity's Song (Band of Thieves)" (lead vocals by Cher)	2:59
2.	"Chastity Overture"	2:35
3.	"Motel I"	2:04
4.	"Chastity Walk"	1:46
5.	"Flowers (Love of a Family)"	2:18
6.	"Chastity Love Theme"	2:02

Side two
No.	Title	Length
1.	"Chastity Titles"	3:32
2.	"Motel II"	2:32
3.	"Chastity Carousel"	2:28
4.	"Mexico"	1:21
5.	"Chastity (Closing Theme)"	3:42

== Personnel ==
- Cher – lead vocals
- Sonny Bono – record producer
- Stan Ross – sound engineer
- Don Peake – arrangement assistance
- Greg Poree – arrangement assistance (track 1)
- Alessio de Paola – photography
