= David Hood =

American bassist and Muscle Shoals session player (born 1943)

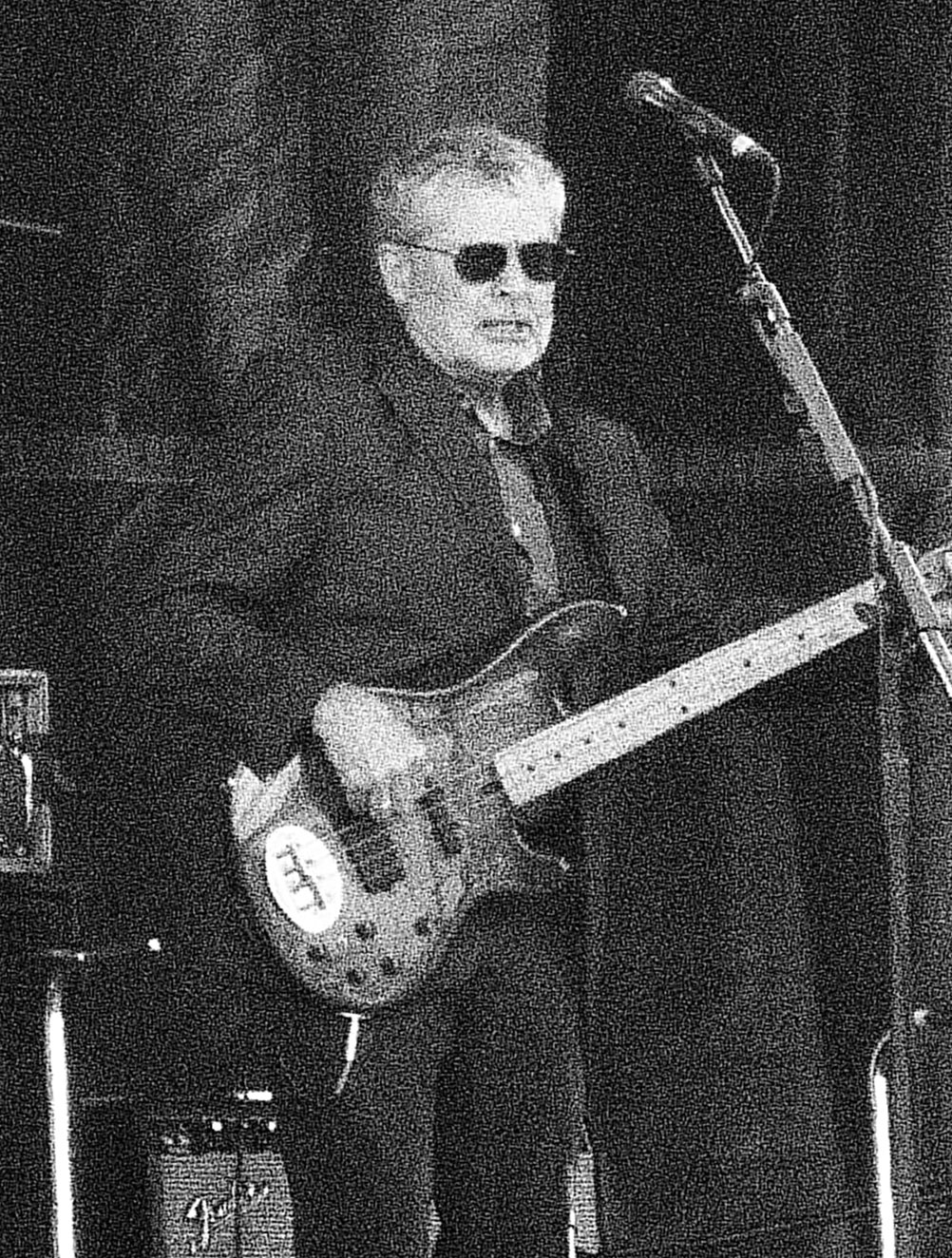
- Hood performing with The Waterboys in 2015

Background information
- Born: September 21, 1943 (age 83); Sheffield, Alabama U.S.
- Genres: Soul, R&B, blues, Rock
- Occupation: Session musician
- Instruments: Bass guitar, trombone
- Formerly of: Muscle Shoals Rhythm Section

David Hood (born September 21, 1943) is an American musician, hailing from Muscle Shoals, Alabama, He is known for playing the bass guitar and trombone, and is a member of the Alabama Music Hall of Fame.

== Early life and education ==
Hood was born in Sheffield, Alabama and attended the University of North Alabama.

== Career ==
Hood started his career playing with the Mystics and as a backup musician at FAME Studios. He went on to co-found Muscle Shoals Sound Studio, where he produced songs for Willie Nelson, Cher and others. He played bass on albums by Aretha Franklin, Boz Scaggs, William Bell, Traffic, the Staple Singers, Leon Russell, Joe Cocker, Albert King, Odetta, John Hiatt, Etta James, Percy Sledge, Cat Stevens, Wendy Waldman, Julian Lennon, Paul Simon, Lulu, Shirley Brown, Glenn Frey, Joan Baez, Tony Joe White, Linda Ronstadt, Paul Anka, Rod Stewart, Solomon Burke, J. J. Cale, Art Garfunkel, Bob Seger, Shelby Lynne, Bugs Bunny, and Frank Black. Hood appeared in 2009 on Klaus Voormann's solo album A Sideman's Journey. He participated in the Waterboys album, Modern Blues, recorded mainly in Nashville, and toured with them from 2014 to 2016.

== Personal life ==
Hood is married to Judy Sockwell Hood. Hood's son, Patterson Hood, is the frontman and one of two (formerly three) songwriters for Drive-By Truckers.

== Collaborations ==
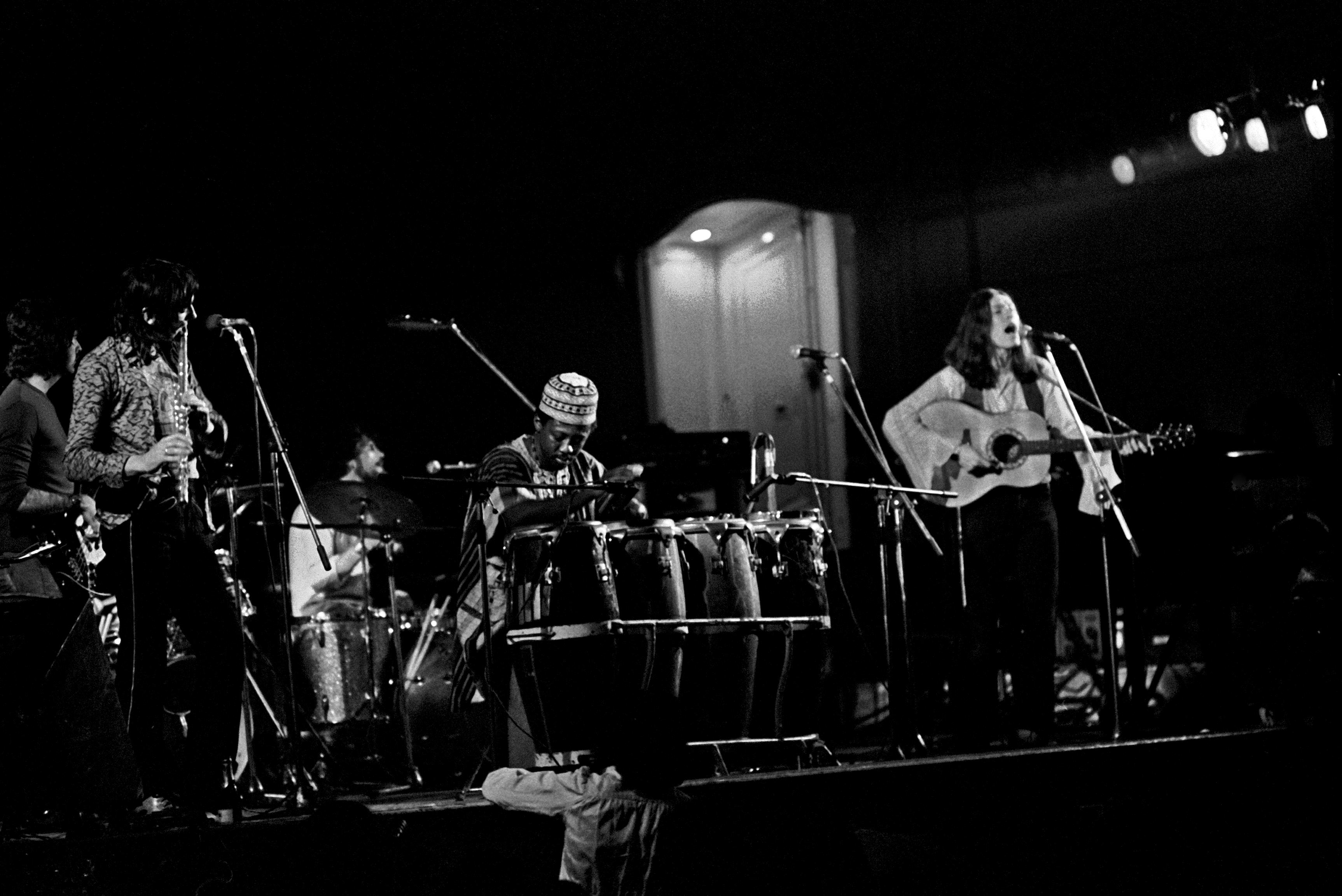
Hood (far left) with Traffic in 1973

With Paul Anka

- Feelings (United Artists Records, 1975)

With Nicole Atkins

- Italian Ice (Single Lock Records, 2020)

With Patti Austin

- Body Language (CTI Records, 1980)
- In My Life (CTI Records, 1983)

With Joan Baez

- Honest Lullaby (Portrait Records, 1979)

With William Bell

- Wow... (Stax Records, 1971)
- Phases of Reality (Stax Records, 1972)

With Frank Black and Reid Paley

- Paley & Francis (Cooking Vinyl, 2011)

With Frank Black

- Honeycomb (Cooking Vinyl, 2005)
- Fast Man Raider Man (Cooking Vinyl, 2006)

With Bobby Bland

- Midnight Run (Malaco Records, 1989)
- Portrait of the Blues (Malaco Records, 1991)
- Sad Street (Malaco Records, 1995)
- Memphis Monday Morning (Malaco Records, 1998)
- Blues at Midnight (Malaco Records, 2003)

With Bonnie Bramlett

- Lady's Choice (Capricorn Records, 1976)
- Beautiful (Rockin' Camel, 2008)

With Dee Dee Bridgewater

- Dee Dee Bridgewater (Atlantic Records, 1976)

With Dianne Brooks

- Back Stairs in My Life (Reprise Records, 1976)

With James Brown

- The Original Disco Man (Polydor Records, 1979)

With Randy Brown

- Midnight Desire (Chocolate City, 1980)

With Shirley Brown

- Joy & Pain (Malaco Records, 1993)
- Unleashed (Malaco Records, 2009)

With Peabo Bryson

- Peabo (Bullet Records, 1976)

With Jimmy Buffett

- Beach House on the Moon (Island Records, 1999)

With Solomon Burke

- Proud Mary (Ola, 1969)

With Billy Burnette

- Gimme You (Columbia Records, 1980)

With JJ Cale

- Really (A&M Records, 1972)

With Kate Campbell

- Monuments (Evangeline Records, 2003)
- 1000 Pound Machine (Large River Music, 2012)

With Kim Carnes

- Sailin' (A&M Records, 1976)

With Clarence Carter

- This is Clarence Carter (Atlantic Records, 1968)
- Testifyin (Atlantic Records, 1969)
- All Y'all Feeling Alright (Cee Gee Entertainment, 2003)

With Beth Nielsen Chapman

- Hearing It First (Capitol Records, 1980)

With Cher

- 3614 Jackson Highway (Atco Records, 1969)

With Jimmy Cliff

- Another Cycle (Island Records, 1971)

With Joe Cocker

- Luxury You Can Afford (Asylum Records, 1978)

With A. J. Croce

- Just Like Medicine (Compass Records, 2017)

With Steve Cropper

- Night After Night (MCA Records, 1982)
- Dedicated – A Salute to the 5 Royales (429 Records, 2011)

With Sheryl Crow

- Threads (Big Machine Records, 2019)

With Billy Ray Cyrus

- The SnakeDoctor Circus (BBR, 2019)

With Gail Davies

- The Game (Warner Bros. Records, 1980)

With Mink DeVille

- Sportin' Life (Polydor Records, 1985)

With Willy DeVille

- Horse of a Different Color (EastWest Records, 1999)

With The Dramatics

- Joy Ride (ABC, 1976)

With José Feliciano

- Sweet Soul Music (Private Stock Records, 1976)

With Eddie Floyd

- Soul Street (Stax Records, 1974)

With Aretha Franklin

- This Girl's in Love with You (Atlantic Records, 1970)
- Spirit in the Dark (Atlantic Records, 1970)

With Glenn Frey

- No Fun Aloud (Asylum Records, 1982)
- The Allnighter (MCA Records, 1984)
- Soul Searchin' (MCA Records, 1988)

With Art Garfunkel

- Breakaway (Columbia Records, 1975)
- Watermark (Columbia Records, 1977)

With Barry Goldberg

- Two Jews Blues (Buddah Records, 1969)
- Barry Goldberg (Atco Records, 1974)

With James Govan

- I'm in Need (Charity, 1987)

With John P. Hammond

- Southern Fried (Atlantic Records, 1971)

With Ronnie Hawkins

- Ronnie Hawkins (Cotillion Records, 1970)

With Levon Helm

- Levon Helm (ABC Records, 1978)
- Levon Helm (Capitol Records, 1982)

With Jason Isbell

- Sirens of the Ditch (New West Records, 2007)

With Etta James

- Tell Mama (Cadet Records, 1968)
- The Right Time (Elektra Records, 1992)

With Margie Joseph

- Margie Joseph Make a New Impression (Volt Records, 1971)

With Albert King

- Lovejoy (Stax Records, 1971)

With Jim Lauderdale

- Black Roses (Sky Crunch Records, 2013)
- London Southern (Proper Records, 2017)

With Bettye LaVette

- The Scene of the Crime (ANTI-, 2007)

With Julian Lennon

- Valotte (Atlantic Records, 1984)

With Lulu

- New Routes (Atlantic Records, 1970)

With Shelby Lynne

- Tears, Lies and Alibis (Everso, 2010)

With Mary MacGregor

- Torn Between Two Lovers (Ariola Records, 1976)

With Lonnie Mack

- The Hills of Indiana (Elektra Records, 1971)

With Mac McAnally

- Nothing but the Truth (Geffen, 1983)

With Delbert McClinton

- Second Wind (Capricorn Records, 1978)
- The Jealous Kind (Capitol Records, 1980)
- Plain from the Heart (Capitol Records, 1981)

With Bill Medley

- Still Hung Up for You (RCA Records, 1985)

With Mel and Tim

- Starting All Over Again (Stax Records, 1972)
- Mel & Tim (Stax Records, 1973)

With Frankie Miller

- Standing on the Edge (Capitol Records, 1982)

With Jackie Moore

- Make Me Feel Like a Woman (Kayvette, 1975)

With Willie Nelson

- Phases and Stages (Atlantic Records, 1974)

With Laura Nyro

- Christmas and the Beads of Sweat (Columbia Records, 1970)

With The Oak Ridge Boys

- American Made (MCA Records, 1983)
- Deliver (MCA Records, 1983)
- Step On Out (MCA Records, 1985)
- Seasons (MCA Records, 1986)

With Odetta

- Odetta Sings (Polydor Records, 1970)

With Danny O'Keefe

- Danny O'Keefe (Cotillion, 1970)

With Tony Orlando

- Tony Orlando (Elektra, 1978)

With Lindi Ortega

- Faded Gloryville (Last Gang Records, 2015)

With Dan Penn

- Nobody's Fool (Bell Records, 1973)
- Do Right Man (Sire Records, 1994)
- Something About the Night (Dandy Records, 2016)

With Wilson Pickett

- Hey Jude (Atlantic Records, 1969)
- Right On (Atlantic Records, 1970)
- Don't Knock My Love (Atlantic Records, 1971)

With Don Preston

- Been Here All The Time (Shelter Records, 1974)

With Primal Scream

- Give Out but Don't Give Up (Sire Records, 1994)

With Eddie Rabbitt

- Loveline (Elektra Records, 1979)

With Helen Reddy

- Take What You Find (Capitol Records, 1980)

With Johnny Rivers

- The Road (Atlantic Records, 1974)
- Borrowed Time (RSO Records, 1980)

With Linda Ronstadt

- Linda Ronstadt (Capitol Records, 1971)

With Billy Joe Royal

- Billy Joe Royal (Atlantic Records, 1992)

With Calvin Russell

- Calvin Russell (Last Call Records, 1997)
- Sam (Last Call Records, 1999)

With Leon Russell

- Leon Russell and the Shelter People (Shelter Records, 1971)

With Carlos Santana

- Havana Moon (CBS Records, 1983)

With Boz Scaggs

- Boz Scaggs (Atlantic Records, 1969)
- My Time (Columbia Records, 1972)

With Bob Seger

- Back in '72 (Reprise Records, 1973)
- Beautiful Loser (Capitol Records, 1975)
- Night Moves (Capitol Records, 1976)
- Stranger in Town (Capitol Records, 1978)
- Against the Wind (Capitol Records, 1980)
- The Distance (Capitol Records, 1982)

With Joe Simon

- Easy to Love (Spring Records, 1977)

With John Simon

- John Simon's Album (Warner Bros. Records, 1970)

With Paul Simon

- There Goes Rhymin' Simon (Columbia Records, 1973)
- Still Crazy After All These Years (Columbia Records, 1975)

With Percy Sledge

- The Percy Sledge Way (Atlantic Records, 1967)
- I'll Be Your Everything (Capricorn Records, 1974)
- Percy! (Monument Records, 1983)
- Wanted Again (Demon Records, 1989)

With Starland Vocal Band

- 4 X 4 (Windsong, 1980)

With Mavis Staples

- Mavis Staples (Volt Records, 1969)
- Only for the Lonely (Volt Records, 1970)
- Oh What a Feeling (Warner Bros. Records, 1979)

With The Staple Singers

- Be Altitude: Respect Yourself (Stax Records, 1972)
- Unlock Your Mind (Warner Bros. Records, 1978)

With Candi Staton

- Candi (Warner Bros. Records, 1974)
- Life Happens (Beracah Records, 2014)

With B. W. Stevenson

- Rainbow Down the Road (Amazing Records, 1990)

With Cat Stevens

- Izitso (A&M Records, 1977)

With Rod Stewart

- Atlantic Crossing (Warner Bros. Records, 1975)
- A Night on the Town (Warner Bros. Records, 1976)

With Billy Swan

- Four (Columbia Records, 1977)

With The Sweet Inspirations

- Sweets for My Sweet (Atlantic Records, 1969)

With Kate Taylor

- It's in There (CBS Records, 1979)

With Traffic

- Shoot Out at the Fantasy Factory (Island Records, 1973)
- On the Road (Island Records, 1973)

With Toulouse

- Toulouse (Magique, 1976)

With Vaya Con Dios

- Roots and Wings (Ariola Records, 1995)

With Wendy Waldman

- Gypsy Symphony (Warner Bros. Records, 1974)

With Leslie West

- Soundcheck (Provogue Records, 2015)

With John Paul White

- Beulah (Single Lock Records, 2016)
- The Hurting Kind (Single Lock Records, 2019)

With Tony Joe White

- The Train I'm On (Warner Brothers, 1972)
- Closer to the Truth (Festival Records, 1991)

With Bobby Womack

- Communication (United Artists Records, 1971)
- Understanding (United Artists Records, 1972)
- Facts of Life (United Artists Records, 1973)
- Lookin' for a Love Again (United Artists Records, 1974)
- Home Is Where the Heart Is (Columbia Records, 1977)
- Pieces (Columbia Records, 1978)
- Roads of Life (Arista Records, 1979)
