= 3614 Jackson Highway =

Studio album by Cher
- Released: June 20, 1969
- Recorded: April 1969
- Studio: Muscle Shoals (Sheffield, Alabama)
- Genres: Folk rock; pop rock; blue-eyed soul
- Length: 33:08
- Labels: ATCO; Rhino Entertainment
- Producers: Jerry Wexler; Tom Dowd; Arif Mardin

Cher chronology
Chér's Golden Greats (1968)	3614 Jackson Highway (1969)	Chastity (1969)

Singles from 3614 Jackson Highway
- 1. "I Walk on Guilded Splinters" Released: June 2, 1969; 2. "For What It's Worth" Released: August 4, 1969

3614 Jackson Highway is the sixth album by American singer-actress Cher, released on June 20, 1969, by ATCO. This album was a commercial failure, peaking at 160, although it received praise and positive reviews from the music critics. 3614 Jackson Highway was the address of Muscle Shoals Sound Studios, where the album, by and large a collection of covers, was recorded.

== Album information ==
3614 Jackson Highway was released in the summer of 1969. It remains Cher's first and last solo studio album for Atco, and was produced by Jerry Wexler, Tom Dowd and Arif Mardin. The cover is a photograph of Cher with the Muscle Shoals Rhythm Section musicians featured on the album. They are: front row, left to right: guitarist Eddie Hinton, bassist David Hood, Sonny Bono, Cher, producer Jerry Wexler, background vocalist Jeannie Greene, background vocalist Donna Jean Godchaux, and producer Tom Dowd. Back row, left to right: lead guitarist Jimmy Johnson, producer Arif Mardin, drummer Roger Hawkins and keyboardist Barry Beckett. Missing were background vocalists Mary Holiday and Sue Pilkington.

The ambitious record was conceived as a way to bring success to Cher, as well as the husband-and-wife duo Sonny & Cher, after a two-year period of commercial failure. The constant evolution of pop culture left the formulaic nature of Sonny & Cher's musical endeavors obsolete; pop music had continued to transform into a more political style marked by anti-war songs protesting the conflict in Vietnam. For months the duo maintained a nightclub act, but audience response was less than positive.

Although the album was largely ignored by the public, critical reception was enthusiastic. Cher's maturing vocals, along with the sophisticated instrumentation and arrangements, garnered praise.

In 1968 and 1969 Cher recorded songs for an album with a tentative release in 1970. For unknown reasons the album was cancelled and five of the tracks were released as singles. The remaining five remained unreleased until 2001 when Rhino Records released a limited edition of 3614 Jackson Highway with the unreleased songs as bonus tracks.

== Singles ==
"I Walk on Guilded Splinters" was released as a single in June 1969.

"For What It's Worth" was released as a single with "(Just Enough To Keep Me) Hangin' On" as its b-side (ATCO Records, 45-6704). Cash Box wrote that Cher's version of the song "proves it as timely today as it was a few years back", highlighting "emphasis on the lyric in a performance that features some excellent Top 40 and FM production touches". Billboard predicted the single would "prove one of Cher's biggest hits", describing her as "in top vocal form in this infectious entry". Cher's cover did not make the Billboard Hot 100 but it did reach #125 in Bubbling Under Hot 100. and #88 in Canada. AllMusic retrospectively called her version "mature [and] forceful".

== Critical reception ==
Professional ratings
Review scores
Source	Rating
AllMusic	4/5 stars

Billboard described the album by Cher as "an impressive collection", wrote that her "brief emotional vocal work gives new meaning to these gems", and called it "her most interesting and therefore her most commercial package in quite some time". Record World wrote that Cher traveled to Muscle Shoals to take advantage of its "marvelous vibrations", and noted that "some mighty fine producers, engineers and musicians" backed her on the album. Cash Box wrote that Cher delivered a "polished set" with "plenty of sales potential", and noted that the album's selection of tunes is "especially impressive".

In a retrospective review Mark Deming of AllMusic wrote that Cher recorded "arguably the finest album of her career", adding that the record "still sounds like a revelation four decades after it was released".

== Track listing ==
Side one
No.	Title	Writer(s)	Length
1.	"For What It's Worth"	Stephen Stills	2:22
2.	"(Just Enough to Keep Me) Hangin' On"	Buddy Mize; Ira Allen	3:18
3.	"(Sittin' On) The Dock of the Bay"	Steve Cropper; Otis Redding	2:41
4.	"Tonight I'll Be Staying Here With You"	Bob Dylan	3:08
5.	"I Threw It All Away"	Bob Dylan	2:49
6.	"I Walk on Guilded Splinters"	Dr. John Creaux	2:32

Side two
No.	Title	Writer(s)	Length
1.	"Lay, Baby, Lay"	Bob Dylan	3:36
2.	"Please Don't Tell Me"	Carroll W. Quillen; Grady Smith	3:36
3.	"Cry Like a Baby"	Spooner Oldham; Dan Penn	2:46
4.	"Do Right Woman, Do Right Man"	Chips Moman; Penn	2:46
5.	"Save the Children"	Eddie Hinton	2:54

2001 CD edition bonus tracks
No.	Title	Writer(s)	Length
12.	"Easy to Be Hard"	Galt MacDermot; James Rado; Gerome Ragni	3:44
13.	"I Believe"	Ervin Drake; Irwin Graham; Jimmy Shirl; Al Stillman	3:55
14.	"Danny Boy"	Frederic Weatherly	5:20
15.	"Momma Look Sharp"	Sherman Edwards	3:33
16.	"It Gets Me Where I Want to Go"	Gabriel Lapano; Lance Wakely	3:10
17.	"You've Made Me So Very Happy"	Brenda Holloway; Patrice Holloway; Frank Wilson; Berry Gordy	2:43
18.	"Yours Until Tomorrow"	Gerry Goffin; Carole King	2:51
19.	"The Thought of Loving You"	David White	2:24
20.	"The First Time"	Sonny Bono	3:24
21.	"Chastity's Song (Band of Thieves)"	Elyse J. Weinberg	3:08
22.	"Chastity's Song (Band of Thieves)" (stereo album version)	Weinberg	3:05
23.	"Superstar"	Bonnie Bramlett; Delaney Bramlett; Leon Russell	3:07

== Personnel ==
- Cher – lead vocals
- Jimmy Johnson – rhythm guitar
- Eddie Hinton – lead guitar
- Barry Beckett – keyboards
- David Hood – bass guitar
- Roger Hawkins – drums
- Jeanie Greene, Donna Jean Godchaux (née Thatcher), Mary Holladay, Sue Pilkington – backing vocalists

Production

- Jerry Wexler – record producer
- Tom Dowd – record producer
- Arif Mardin – record producer
- Stan Vincent – record producer
- Greg Poree – arrangement assistance

Design

- Stephen Paley – photography
- Bryan Lasley – art direction
- Patrick Pending – art direction

== Charts ==
Weekly chart performance for 3614 Jackson Highway
Chart (1969)	Peak position
US Billboard 200	160
