= Sad Street =

Studio album by Bobby "Blue" Bland
- Released: 1995
- Studio: Muscle Shoals
- Genre: Blues
- Label: Malaco
- Producers: Wolf Stephenson, Tommy Couch

Bobby "Blue" Bland chronology
Turn on Your Love Light: The Duke Recordings Vol. 2 (1994)	Sad Street (1995)	That Did It!: The Duke Recordings Vol. 3 (1996)

Sad Street is an album by the American musician Bobby "Blue" Bland. It was released in 1995.

The album was nominated for a Grammy Award for "Best Contemporary Blues Album". It peaked at No. 11 on the Billboard Blues Albums chart.

== Production ==
Sad Street was produced by Wolf Stephenson and Tommy Couch. It was recorded with the Muscle Shoals house band; string arrangements were done in Miami, Florida. The title song was written by George Jackson, with many others provided by the songwriting partnership of Sam Mosley and Robert Johnson.

== Critical reception ==
Professional ratings
Review scores
Source	Rating
AllMusic	2/5 stars
The Commercial Appeal	3.5/4 stars
The Encyclopedia of Popular Music	3.5/5 stars
MusicHound R&B: The Essential Album Guide	1/5 stars
(The New) Rolling Stone Album Guide	3/5 stars

The Commercial Appeal opined that "Bland gets deep into the blues," writing that "'Double Trouble' deals with the age-old blues dilemma of dealing with a troublesome wife and girlfriend." The Tampa Tribune thought that the album "perfectly captures his wistful romanticism and raspy-smooth vocals."

Texas Monthly concluded that Malaco's "synthesizer-and-strings approach has kept him contemporary without making him sound foolish." The San Antonio Express-News noted that "Sad Street find Bland still working a smooth, sophisticated, but unmistakably blues-driven, groove."

AllMusic wrote that "Malaco's well-oiled, violin-enriched studio sound fit Bland's laid-back contemporary approach just fine (even if his voice admittedly wasn't what it used to be)." MusicHound R&B: The Essential Album Guide agreed that Bland's voice was "a ravaged hulk by this point." The Sunday Times deemed Sad Street a "gritty" album that proved Bland's "Southern blues credentials."

== Track listing ==
No.	Title	Length
1.	"Double Trouble"
2.	"Sad Street"
3.	"God Bless the Child That's Got His Own"
4.	"Tonight's the Night (It's Gonna Be Alright)"
5.	"My Heart's Been Broken Again"
6.	"I've Got a Twenty Room House"
7.	"Mind Your Own Business"
8.	"I Wanna Tell You About the Blues"
9.	"I Had a Dream Last Night"
10.	"Let's Have Some Fun"
