= Barry Beckett =

American keyboardist and record producer (1943–2009)

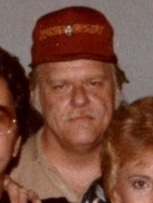

Background information
- Born: Barry Edward Beckett; February 4, 1943; Birmingham, Alabama, U.S.
- Died: June 10, 2009 (aged 66) Hendersonville, Tennessee, U.S.
- Occupations: Keyboardist; record producer
- Instrument: Keyboards
- Formerly of: Muscle Shoals Rhythm Section

Barry Edward Beckett (February 4, 1943 – June 10, 2009) was an American keyboardist, session musician, record producer, and studio founder. He is best known for his work with David Hood, Jimmy Johnson, and Roger Hawkins, his bandmates in the Muscle Shoals Rhythm Section, which performed with numerous notable artists on their studio albums and helped define the "Muscle Shoals sound".

Among the artists Beckett recorded with were Bob Dylan, Boz Scaggs, Paul Simon, Rod Stewart, Duane Allman, Lynyrd Skynyrd, Bob Seger, Southside Johnny and the Asbury Jukes, Dire Straits, the Proclaimers and Phish. He was also briefly a member of the band Traffic.

== Biography ==
Beckett was born in Birmingham, Alabama. He rose to prominence as a member of the rhythm section at the Sheffield, Alabama-based Muscle Shoals Sound Studio, of which he was one of the founders in 1969. As a founding member of the Muscle Shoals Rhythm Section, he helped define what became known as the Muscle Shoals sound. In addition, the studio produced such chart-making hits as "Torn Between Two Lovers" by Mary MacGregor and the Sanford-Townsend Band's "Smoke from a Distant Fire".

In 1973, Beckett took to the road in the expanded lineup of Traffic; recordings from this tour were released on the band's live album On the Road.

Beckett was co-producing with Jerry Wexler when, in 1979, Bob Dylan called on Wexler to produce the sessions for the album Slow Train Coming. Beckett not only co-produced the album but played piano and organ throughout. (He did not go on the road as a gospel tours musician behind Dylan, but he was back in the studio with him in February 1980 to co-produce, again with Wexler, the album Saved, on which he was replaced on keyboards by Spooner Oldham and Terry Young after the session of February 12, 1980, and so plays only on the album's title track, "Solid Rock", "What Can I Do for You?" and "Satisfied Mind".) On the album liner notes Beckett is billed as co-producer and as "special guest artist".

Beckett moved to Nashville in 1982 to become A & R country music director for Warner Bros. Records and co-produced Williams, Jr.'s records with Jim Ed Norman. Beckett produced records independently after leaving Warner Bros. Records.

He also played on Paul Simon's albums There Goes Rhymin' Simon and Still Crazy After All These Years, which reached number 1 on the Billboard 200 pop chart.

Beckett died from complications of a stroke at his home in Hendersonville, Tennessee, aged 66.

== Awards and honors ==
- In 1995, Beckett was inducted into the Alabama Music Hall of Fame as a member of the Muscle Shoals Rhythm Section.

== Collaborations ==
With Solomon Burke

- Proud Mary (Ola, 1969)

With Etta James

- Tell Mama (Cadet Records, 1968)
- Seven Year Itch (Island Records, 1988)
- Stickin' to My Guns (Island Records, 1990)
- Love's Been Rough on Me (Private Music, 1997)

With Bob Seger

- Back in '72 (Reprise Records, 1973)
- Beautiful Loser (Capitol Records, 1975)
- Night Moves (Capitol Records, 1976)
- Stranger in Town (Capitol Records, 1978)
- Against the Wind (Capitol Records, 1980)
- The Distance (Capitol Records, 1982)
- The Fire Inside (Capitol Records, 1991)

With Joan Baez

- Honest Lullaby (Portrait Records, 1979)

With Willie Nelson

- Phases and Stages (Atlantic Records, 1974)

With Feargal Sharkey

- Songs from the Mardi Gras (Virgin Records, 1991)

With William Bell

- Wow... (Stax Records, 1971)
- Phases of Reality (Stax Records, 1972)

With Julian Lennon

- Valotte (Atlantic Records, 1984)

With Cher

- 3614 Jackson Highway (Atco Records, 1969)

With Vince Gill

- When I Call Your Name (MCA Records, 1989)
- Pocket Full of Gold (MCA Records, 1991)
- When Love Finds You (MCA Records, 1994)

With Kim Carnes

- Sailin' (A&M Records, 1976)

With Boz Scaggs

- Boz Scaggs (Atlantic Records, 1969)
- My Time (Columbia Records, 1972)
- Some Change (Virgin Records, 1994)

With Mary MacGregor

- Torn Between Two Lovers (Ariola Records, 1976)

With Mark Knopfler

- Golden Heart (Vertigo Records, 1996)

With John P. Hammond

- Southern Fried (Atlantic Records, 1971)

With Mavis Staples

- Mavis Staples (Volt Records, 1969)
- Only for the Lonely (Volt Records, 1970)
- Oh What a Feeling (Warner Bros. Records, 1979)

With Wilson Pickett

- Hey Jude (Atlantic Records, 1969)
- Right On (Atlantic Records, 1970)
- Don't Knock My Love (Atlantic Records, 1971)

With Paul Anka

- Feelings (United Artists Records, 1975)

With John Michael Montgomery

- What I Do the Best (Atlantic Records, 1996)

With Steve Cropper

- Night After Night (MCA Records, 1982)

With Eddie Rabbitt

- Loveline (Elektra Records, 1979)

With Dee Dee Bridgewater

- Dee Dee Bridgewater (Atlantic Records, 1976)

With Albert King

- Lovejoy (Stax Records, 1971)

With Paul Simon

- There Goes Rhymin' Simon (Columbia Records, 1973)
- Still Crazy After All These Years (Columbia Records, 1975)

With Wendy Waldman

- Gypsy Symphony (Warner Bros. Records, 1974)

With Wynonna Judd

- Wynonna (Curb Records, 1992)
- Tell Me Why (Curb Records, 1993)

With Levon Helm

- Levon Helm (ABC Records, 1978)
- Levon Helm (Capitol Records, 1982)

With Trace Adkins

- Dreamin' Out Loud (Capitol Records, 1996)

With Aretha Franklin

- This Girl's in Love with You (Atlantic Records, 1970)
- Spirit in the Dark (Atlantic Records, 1970)

With Candi Staton

- Candi (Warner Bros. Records, 1974)
- His Hands (Honest Records, 2006)

With Donovan

- Lady of the Stars (RCA Records, 1984)

With Dolly Parton

- White Limozeen (Columbia Records, 1989)

With John Prine

- Storm Windows (Asylum Records, 1980)

With Aaron Neville

- The Tattoeed Heart (A&M Records, 1995)

With Kenny Chesney

- All I Need to Know (BNA Records, 1995)
- Me and You (BNA, 1996)

With Joe Cocker

- Luxury You Can Afford (Asylum Records, 1978)

With Ronnie Hawkins

- Ronnie Hawkins (Cotillion Records, 1970)

With Lulu

- New Routes (Atlantic Records, 1970)

With Beth Nielsen Chapman

- Hearing It First (Capitol Records, 1980)

With Dion DiMucci

- Velvet and Steel (Epic Records, 1986)

With Ilse DeLange

- World of Hurt (Warner Bros. Records, 1998)
- Bad Company - Stories Told & Untold (1996) – Barry Beckett — electric piano (Wurlitzer), organ

With Dion DiMucci

- Velvet and Steel (DaySpring Records, 1987)

With Chely Wright

- Woman in the Moon (Mercury Records, 1994)

With Odetta

- Odetta Sings (Polydor Records, 1970)

With Laura Nyro

- Christmas and the Beads of Sweat (Columbia Records, 1970)

With Johnny Rivers

- The Road (Atlantic Records, 1974)

With Bob Dylan

- Slow Train Coming (Columbia Records, 1979)
- Saved (Columbia Records, 1980)

With Peabo Bryson

- Peabo (Bullet Records, 1976)

With Ricky Van Shelton

- A Bridge I Didn't Burn (Columbia Records, 1993)

With J. J. Cale

- Really (A&M Records, 1972)

With Art Garfunkel

- Breakaway (Columbia Records, 1975)
- Watermark (Columbia Records, 1977)

With Rosanne Cash

- King's Record Shop (Columbia Records, 1987)

With Michael Martin Murphey

- Tonight We Ride (Warner Bros. Records, 1986)

With José Feliciano

- Sweet Soul Music (Private Stock Records, 1976)

With Cat Stevens

- Izitso (A&M Records, 1977)

With Leon Russell

- Leon Russell and the Shelter People (Shelter Records, 1971)

With Rod Stewart

- Atlantic Crossing (Warner Bros. Records, 1975)
- A Night on the Town (Warner Bros. Records, 1976)

With Glenn Frey

- The Allnighter (MCA Records, 1984)
- Soul Searchin' (MCA Records, 1988)

With Linda Ronstadt

- Linda Ronstadt (Capitol Records, 1971)

With Rodney Crowell

- Diamonds & Dirt (Columbia Records, 1988)
- Keys to the Highway (Columbia Records, 1989)
- Life Is Messy (Columbia Records, 1992)

With John P. Hammond

- So Many Roads (Vanguard Records, 1965)
