= Muscle Shoals Rhythm Section =

Group of American session musicians

- Origin: Muscle Shoals, Alabama, U.S.
- Genres: R&B, soul, country
- Years active: 1960s–present
- Past members: Norbert Putnam; David Briggs; Jerry Carrigan; Barry Beckett; Roger Hawkins; David Hood; Jimmy Johnson

The Muscle Shoals Rhythm Section is a group of American session musicians based in the northern Alabama town of Muscle Shoals. One of the most prominent American studio house bands from the 1960s to the 1980s, these musicians, individually or as a group, have been associated with more than 500 recordings, including 75 gold and platinum hits. They were masters at creating a southern combination of R&B, soul and country music known as the "Muscle Shoals sound" to back up black artists, who were often in disbelief to learn that the studio musicians were white. From 1962 to 1969, two groups used the name "Muscle Shoals Rhythm Section", both associated with Rick Hall at FAME Studios in Muscle Shoals.

The original group hired by Hall in the early 1960s was Norbert Putnam, David Briggs, and Jerry Carrigan, who created hit records that brought recognition and stature to this unknown and out-of-the-way studio. Courted by Nashville studios, Putnam, Briggs, and Carrigan left Muscle Shoals to pursue independent careers.

To replace them, Hall hired Barry Beckett, Roger Hawkins, David Hood and Jimmy Johnson, who were initially called "the Second FAME Gang" but became widely known as "The Swampers". The Swampers recorded, produced, or engineered hits by Aretha Franklin, Wilson Pickett, Percy Sledge, the Rolling Stones, Bob Dylan, Paul Simon, Leon Russell, Lynyrd Skynyrd, Rod Stewart, Bob Seger and the Staple Singers. The Swampers were the subject of the 2013 documentary film Muscle Shoals, winner of the 2013 Boulder International Film Festival Grand Prize. They were mentioned by name in the lyrics of "Sweet Home Alabama" (1974) by Lynyrd Skynyrd and appear on the cover of Cher's 1969 album 3614 Jackson Highway.

Aretha Franklin recorded her 1967 hit "I Never Loved a Man (The Way I Love You)" at FAME, with the Swampers providing the accompaniment. After Franklin's husband Ted White started an altercation, producer Jerry Wexler decided to continue recording the LP in New York, again using the Swampers. The group also accompanied Franklin on other albums, such as Lady Soul, Aretha Arrives, Aretha Now and This Girl's in Love with You.

In 1969, the Swampers parted ways with FAME Studios and founded Muscle Shoals Sound Studios. Hall founded a third FAME rhythm section: Freeman Brown (drums), Jesse Boyce (bass), Junior Lowe (guitar), Clayton Ivey (keyboard) and a four-man brass section. They were a blend of African American and white, and sometimes they were called the FAME Gang.

In 2008, the original FAME group and the Swampers were inducted into the Alabama Music Hall of Fame and into the Musicians Hall of Fame.

== History ==
In 1958, Rick Hall, a musician and songwriter in Florence, Alabama, befriended Tom Stafford, whose father owned a pharmacy in downtown Florence. Above the pharmacy, up some rickety stairs, Stafford had some recording gear. Stafford, Hall, and Billy Sherrill created "SPAR" (an acronym for Stafford Publishing And Recording). Hall asked some 16-year-old members of a local band—Norbert Putnam, David Briggs and Jerry Carrigan—to make some song demos. It was here that these young musicians were first exposed to creating original parts on new songs, and they became proficient at it. Also frequenting these rooms were future musical elites, such as Donnie Fritts, Spooner Oldham, Terry Thompson and Dan Penn. Stafford and Sherrill later ejected Hall from the partnership, and Hall's humiliation fueled him to attempt to outdo them as their competitor.

=== Achieving recording industry stature ===
In 1961, Hall took out a loan to buy an abandoned brick warehouse in Muscle Shoals, Alabama, to make a recording studio. Muscle Shoals is one of four towns in northwest Alabama clustered along the Tennessee River; the others are Florence, Sheffield, and Tuscumbia. His rhythm section (piano, bass and drums) was Briggs, Putnam, and Carrigan.

One of Hall's first protégés was an African American bellhop at the Sheffield Hotel named Arthur Alexander, who had written some songs. Hall was a demanding taskmaster, and his recording session required 30 or 40 takes to get the rhythm tracks he wanted. The song, "You Better Move On" rose to number 24 on Billboard's Hot 100 in March 1962, and two years later, cover versions were recorded by both The Hollies and The Rolling Stones. Arthur Alexander was flown to Philadelphia to appear on Dick Clark's American Bandstand. The success stunned the big-city studios; the music industry quickly took notice of this unknown little studio called FAME (Florence Alabama Music Enterprises).

Well-known producers began coming to Muscle Shoals to record with this house band to capture the perceived "Muscle Shoals sound". Atlanta producer Bill Lowery brought The Tams, who recorded "What Kind of Fool (Do You Think I Am)", and Nashville's Felton Jarvis brought Tommy Roe to record "Everybody". Percy Sledge's cousin, Jimmy Hughes recorded "Steal Away" with the same teenaged session players, and it rose to #17 on the Billboard Hot 100 It was followed by "Neighbor, Neighbor" and "Why Not Tonight"– both of which made the charts. Hall stated, "Those hits showed that FAME could be musically diverse, and they announced our open-door policy toward other labels". Rick Hall's financial success from "You Better Move On" gave him the capital to secure land in Muscle Shoals City, where, in 1962, he built a first-rate studio at 603 Avalon Avenue patterned after Owen Bradley's in Nashville. Some 50 years later, the building would be listed on the National Register of Historic Places.

Before long, Nashville music moguls Ray Stevens, Bob Beckham and Felton Jarvis made overtures to lure away Hall's backing musicians, saying that in Nashville, they would make four times the money Rick Hall was paying them. They resigned as a group to pursue independent careers in Nashville, and Hall was without his hit-making rhythm section. The replacement musicians were initially called "the Second FAME Gang" but were later nicknamed "The Swampers".

=== Swampers' early days ===
The core group of Rick Hall's new rhythm section was:

- Barry Beckett— keyboards
- Roger Hawkins— drums
- David Hood— bass
- Jimmy Johnson— guitar

Affectionately called The Swampers, but later officially adopting the name The Muscle Shoals Rhythm Section, this group achieved extraordinary success as one of the best-known group of session musicians of their era. The nickname "The Swampers" was coined by producer Denny Cordell during recording sessions for Leon Russell because of their "funky, soulful Southern 'swamp' sound".

Guitarist Jimmy Johnson was the first FAME employee and did many jobs there, including playing rhythm guitar, engineering, and sweeping the floors. In 1964, drummer Roger Hawkins was hired. When bass player David Hood first received the call that a job at FAME had opened up, he was working at his father's tire store.

Keyboard player Barry Beckett knew nothing about Muscle Shoals in 1967, but was hired on a session there, James and Bobby Purify's "I'm Your Puppet". He said, "Every night I would just sit there and listen to the tape [still without vocals] over and over again", and said, "that was amazing." With no firm job offer, Beckett moved his family from Florida to Muscle Shoals and was eventually hired. On the many hit records out of Muscle Shoals, there were many incidences where other musicians would join or substitute, including Chips Moman (guitar), Junior Lowe (guitar), Dan Penn, Tommy Cogbill, Pete Carr (guitar), Spooner Oldham (organ and piano).

According to music writer Carla Jean Whitley, more than a few people were surprised to learn that the musicians backing many notable black artists were white. Whitley said, "There were many producers accused of lying [about it]...Rod Stewart was one of those who took his producer out and said, 'seriously?' " In the early 1960s, it was not a routine practice to have the same musicians as a "house band" for recording different artists, the exceptions being Motown and Stax Records. Hall wanted to obtain a consistent sound rather than have unfamiliar musicians on each session. The New York Times called the Muscle Shoals sound "indigenous American music, a distinctly Southern amalgamation of rhythm & blues, soul, and country music".

Atlantic Records executive Jerry Wexler became acquainted with Hall and brought artists such as Wilson Pickett and Aretha Franklin to record at FAME with the group of southern musicians based on their previous string of hit recordings.

=== 1967 Aretha Franklin session ===
In January 1967, Jerry Wexler brought Aretha Franklin, then in her mid-20s, to Muscle Shoals for her first session for Atlantic. During this first session with the Swampers for "I Never Loved a Man the Way I Love You", Franklin's husband at the time, Ted White, who had been cordial at first, became belligerent. White had secretly been sharing a bottle of vodka with the horn section during the session. White then demanded that Ken Laxton, the trumpet player, be fired for making passes at Aretha. Hall and Wexler reluctantly agreed. About an hour later, White burst into the control room and demanded that the sax player be fired, saying, "He's flirting with my wife". The producers then fired the sax player. By this time everyone was exhausted and the rapidly-deteriorating session was terminated.

An hour later, Rick Hall, who had begun drinking after the session ended, went to Aretha and Ted's hotel room at the Downtowner Hotel in Florence "to try to smooth things over", but a fist fight erupted between Hall and White, with Aretha joining in to try to get Hall out. Hall then screamed, cursed and pounded the door, arousing Wexler, whose room was nearby. Wexler was horrified. Hall went to the lobby, called Aretha's room, and told Ted he'd better get out of town. They left the following day.

The only song that had been finished, "I Never Loved a Man (The Way I Love You)", went on to number one on Billboard's R&B Selling chart and number nine on the Billboard Hot 100, so Atlantic Records wanted the Swampers, but without Hall and without Muscle Shoals. The solution was to fly the Swampers to New York to record at Atlantic Studios. Less than a month later, The Swampers were in New York recording "Respect", Aretha's first hit that held the number one R&B spot for eight weeks and was number one on the pop charts for two weeks. Rolling Stone named it as the fifth-best song of all time. Some of the other songs for Aretha were Do Right Woman, Do Right Man, Think, Share Your Love With Me, and Call Me.

=== 1969: independence ===
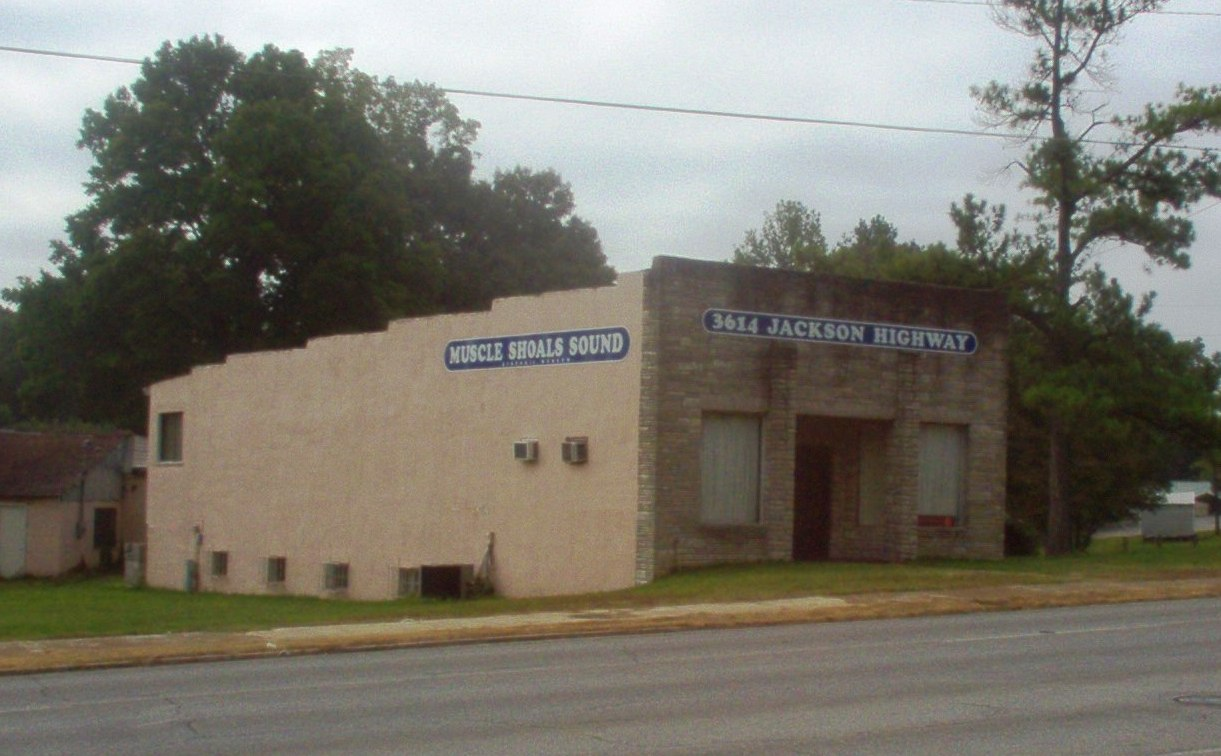
3614 Jackson Highway, September 2007

In 1969, after a financial dispute, the Swampers broke away from Rick Hall and FAME to purchase a tiny studio with burlap-covered walls at 3614 Jackson Highway. They were aided in the process by Wexler, who arranged a loan from Atlantic Records to make much-needed equipment upgrades to 8-track recording machines that were compatible with Atlantic's equipment. The Swampers were to pay the loans back by providing studio time. At first, Hawkins and Johnson had more ownership, but subsequently they made Hood and Beckett equal partners at no cost. The Muscle Shoals Rhythm Section created more than 50 hits at this studio.

The studio's sole bathroom was often used as a sound booth. The musicians would listen out on the porch to make final judgement on finished songs. David Hood said, "The building was a crackerbox building. A loud truck driving down the street or a heavy rainstorm, you'd have to stop working, because it was not built as a studio. It was a just a commercial building that had been adapted for studio use."

They asked themselves, "What are we going to call this place?" David Hood suggested the name, "Muscle Shoals Sound" and they all laughed. The joke was that the new studio, technically was in Sheffield, not Muscle Shoals. Only locals would know that, because the towns melded together. Since they had had a dispute with Rick Hall, Hood said, "So I thought, let's call it 'Muscle Shoals Sound' just to get at Rick." They also trademarked the name "The Muscle Shoals Rhythm Section".

Things were lean the first year. Finally they had a hit single with "Take a Letter Maria" by R.B. Greaves. The song reached number two on the Hot 100 and was certified gold. In 1971, Atlantic Records moved their Muscle Shoals business to Criteria Studios in Miami and asked the Swampers to move there. When the Swampers refused, Atlantic called their loan on the new equipment. About this time, Stax Records in Memphis was facing financial difficulties and began outsourcing work to Muscle Shoals.

More and more business from established artists then came to the Swampers, replacing the lost Atlantic Records business. From this point, the studio began turning out hits such as Leon Russell's "Tight Rope", the Staple Singers' "I'll Take You There" and Paul Simon's "Kodachrome".

=== 1969 Rolling Stones session ===
The Rolling Stones, newly signed to Atlantic Records, arrived in Sheffield, Alabama, in December, 1969, two nights after a performance in West Palm Beach, Florida. They had been assured that the planned recording session could be kept secret. The little studio at 3614 Jackson Highway was still in its infancy, with only one hit thus far, plus a Cher album that was not a commercial success. Rick Hall sardonically said, "The Rolling Stones thought they were cutting at FAME".

The Stones were there three days, spending most of their time in the studio engineered by Swamper Jimmy Johnson. The first night, they recorded "You Gotta Move"; the second night, "Brown Sugar", the third, "Wild Horses". Mick Jagger wrote three verses on a stenographer's pad on the spot for "Brown Sugar", which made number 490 on Rolling Stone's list of the 500 top songs ever recorded. Swamper David Hood's son who was there said, "Their visit was kept a secret from most of the locals, and the world's biggest rock and roll band came, recorded and left (headed for infamy at Altamont, no less) without the conservative townsfolk even knowing they were there." On the documentary film, Muscle Shoals, Keith Richards said of the sessions, "I don't think we'd been quite so prolific ever."

== Swampers session approach ==
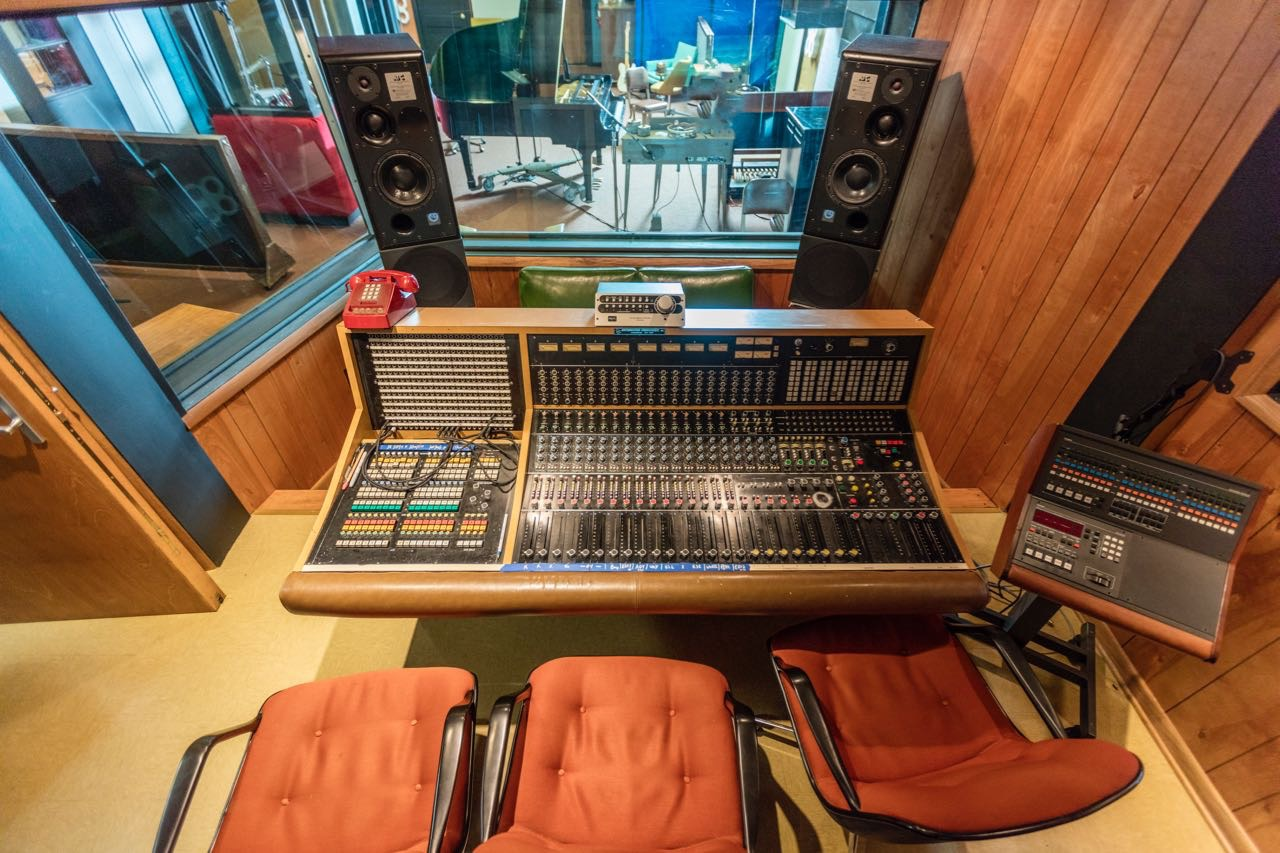
2016 photo of Muscle Shoals Sound Studio 1969 API Console

When Atlantic Records recorded in New York, the typical procedure was to hire an arranger who would come up with the song style from a demo recording and write out the parts for all musicians. In the session, musicians would come in and just play what was written for them. If it was not successful, the arranger was to blame. In Muscle Shoals and other Southern studios, the process was quite different. The musicians rarely read music, and usually nothing was written in advance; it was called a "head session".

As an example, in the Muscle Shoals recording of Wilson Pickett's classic hit "Land of 1000 Dances", Jerry Wexler chose the song–it was to be a cover version of a song by Chris Kenner. In its original state, it was much too slow and had a honky-tonk piano sound. Wexler had faith that the Swampers could make something out of it.

When the session started, the Swampers began trying different rhythm patterns, dance beats and tempos for the song. After an hour of this, nothing was gelling. Then Chips Moman hit on a guitar lick that set the basic groove and everyone fell in. The arrangement built communally. They decided to break it up by putting a solo drum interlude. During this, Pickett started screaming over the drummer, "nah, nah nah nah nah," then said, "I need somebody to help me now". It was captured on tape, and the players were summoned to the control room, where Rick Hall shouted, "Guys, we are now cutting a smash record". Musicians Moman and Cogbill disagreed, saying that there was no intro and no turnaround— the song was far from finished. Pickett borrowed the line, "nah, nah nah nah nah" and its melody from Cannibal & The Headhunters' 1965 version of "Land of 1000 Dances". What started as an ad lib by Frankie Garcia (Cannibal) from a live performance was then incorporated into their recording of the song, which reached number 30 on the Billboard Hot 100 chart in early 1965. It was not part of Chris Kenner's own original 1962 recording.

In Hall's autobiography, he said Pickett suggested singing the count off, "one, two, three". Wexler told a different story and stated, "After dozens of abortive attempts, I came up with an idea. 'Sing the counts, Wilson', I suggested. 'Make the counts part of the intro' ". Hall said that was crazy—who ever heard of singing a count off? Pickett said, "let me show you," and got the horn players (Wayne Jackson, Charlie Chalmers, Andrew Love and Floyd Newman) to hit a chord.

The bass lick that followed was actually a second count off and took trials by three bass players. Moman suggested they allow Tommy Cogbill (guitar player) to switch to bass and give it a try. Cogbill put Vaseline on his fingertips and delivered the lick.

Since they were recording in mono on one track, all had to now play it correctly from start to finish. If anyone missed his part, they all would have had to do the entire song from the beginning, and repetition often loses a song's excitement, due to fatigue. Hall said, "everybody looked at each other like, 'If you miss this, man, you're dead'." When they succeeded, there were high fives all around the studio. Hall said, "When you hear that record today, you can tell that everybody was feeding off the enthusiasm of everybody else in that room".

== Later years ==
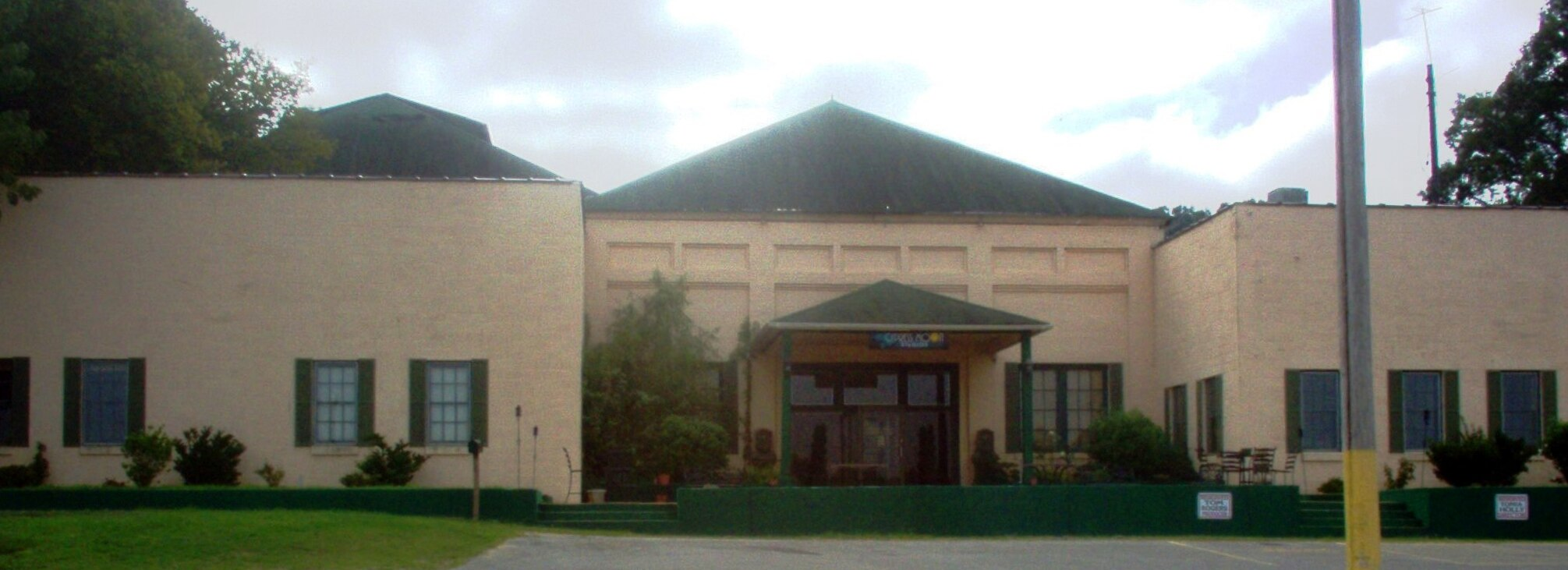
Muscle Shoals Sound - New Location

The Muscle Shoals Rhythm Section closed the original on Jackson Highway in April, 1979, and moved to a new studio at 1000 Alabama Avenue in nearby Sheffield. The town leaders sold Sheffield's abandoned 31,000 square feet (2,900 m^{2}) Armory to the Swampers at an unbeatable price, to counter a nearby city's offer to lure them away. That year, the new studio recorded the Bob Dylan album Slow Train Coming, co-produced by Barry Beckett, who also performed on it. The new studio marked a new beginning for Beckett, Hawkins, Hood and Johnson, allowing them to move toward production and publishing rather than performing. They continued to operate there until 1985, when they closed the business. They sold it to their longtime friend Tommy Couch, owner of Malaco Records, based in Jackson, Mississippi. At that time, three of the Swampers joined other session players, such as the keyboardist Carson Whitsett, backing Bobby "Blue" Bland and other artists recording for the Malaco label. They occasionally worked at other studios.

Beckett left Alabama in 1982 to move to Nashville, where he became A&R man for Warner Music Group. He later worked independently with Alabama, Asleep at the Wheel, Kenny Chesney and others. He performed on recording sessions until 2005, when health problems forced him to retire. He died in 2009 at age 66.

During the 1990s and later, the group continued working as a studio band, often with Clayton Ivey on keyboards, for artists including Gregg Allman (All Night All Stars), T. Graham Brown, Jimmy Buffett, Melissa Etheridge, John Hiatt, the Oak Ridge Boys, Johnny Paycheck, Etta James, and Joe Louis Walker.

== Honors and awards ==
Lynyrd Skynyrd referred to the musicians as "The Swampers" in the 1974 song "Sweet Home Alabama":

"Now, Muscle Shoals has got the Swampers
And they've been known to pick a song or two
Lord, they get me off so much
They pick me up when I'm feeling blue
Now, how 'bout you?"

The Muscle Shoals Rhythm Section, individually or as a group, have been associated with more than 500 recordings, including 75 gold and platinum hits. They appeared on the cover of Cher's 1969 album 3614 Jackson Highway. Four members were inducted into the Alabama Music Hall of Fame in 1995 and also received a "Lifework Award for Non-Performing Achievement". In 2008, the Muscle Shoals Rhythm Section was inducted into the Nashville-based Musicians Hall of Fame, along with Swampers musicians Pete Carr (guitar), Spooner Oldham (organ and piano), Albert S. Lowe Jr., Clayton Ivey, Randy McCormick, and Will McFarlane. In 2019, the original Muscle Shoals Rhythm Section, including Norbert Putnam, David Briggs, Jerry Carrigan, Terry Thompson, Earl "Peanut" Montgomery, Joe South and Reggie Young, was inducted, as well as the Muscle Shoals Horn Section. Aaron Brown, Harrison Calloway, Ronny Eades, Charles Rose, and Harvey Thompson.

The Muscle Shoals Rhythm Section is featured in the 2013 documentary film Muscle Shoals, which won the Grand Prize in the 2013 Boulder International Film Festival.

== Selected recordings ==
| Song | Artist | Date | Charting on US Pop chart | Notes |
|---|---|---|---|---|
| "Mustang Sally" | Wilson Pickett | recorded November 4, 1966 | #9 | |
| "I Never Loved a Man (The Way I Love You)" | Aretha Franklin | recorded January 24, 1967 | #9 | |
| "Respect" | Aretha Franklin | recorded February 14, 1967 | #1 | |
| "Tell Mama" | Etta James | October 1967 | #23 | |
| "Take Time to Know Her" | Percy Sledge | recorded February 1, 1968 | #11 | |
| "Hey Jude" | Wilson Pickett | recorded November 27, 1968 | #23 | featuring Duane Allman on guitar |
| "Making Love (At the Dark End of the Street)" | Clarence Carter | recorded January 6, 1969 | | |
| "Take a Letter, Maria" | R. B. Greaves | recorded August 19, 1969 | #2 | |
| "I'll Take You There" | The Staple Singers | September 1971 | #1 | |
| "Kodachrome" | Paul Simon | recorded 1973 | #2 | |
| "Mainstreet" | Bob Seger | recorded 1976 | #24 | |

== See also ==
- Muscle Shoals Horns
- The Funk Brothers
- Booker T. & the M.G.'s
- Hi Rhythm Section
- The J.B.'s
- The Memphis Boys
- The Nashville A-Team
- Compass Point All Stars
- Tower of Power Horn Section
- MFSB
- The Love Unlimited Orchestra
- Abnuceals Emuukha Electric Symphony Orchestra by Frank Zappa
- The Wrecking Crew
- The Section
- Eddie Hinton
- Category:Muscle Shoals Rhythm Section members
