= Mavis Staples discography =

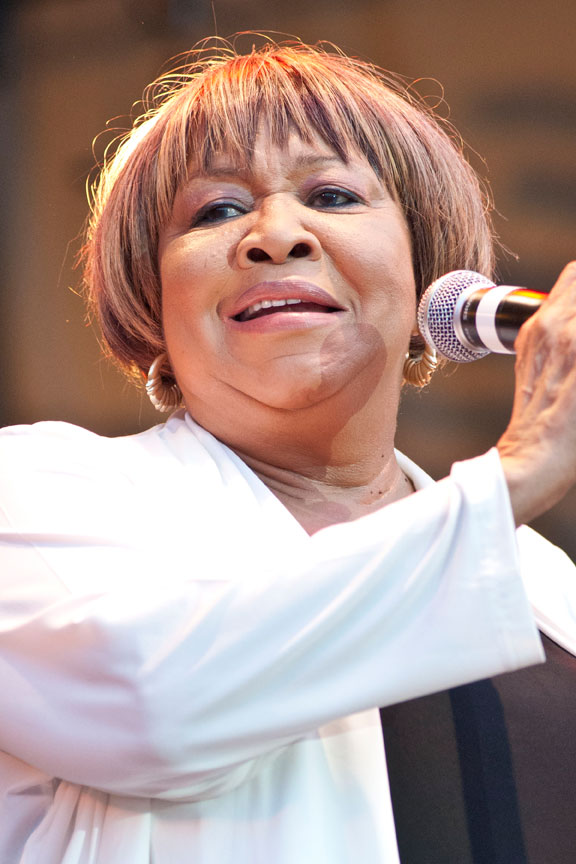
- Mavis Staples performs at the Chicago Annual Blues Festival on June 10, 2012.
- Studio albums: 13
- EPs: 1
- Soundtrack albums: 1
- Live albums: 3
- Compilation albums: 3
- Tribute albums: 1
- Singles: 51

American singer Mavis Staples was born in Chicago, Illinois on July 10, 1939. Her initial recordings were as a member of her family group, the Staple Singers. Led by her father Roebuck "Pops" Staples the Staple Singers were major artists in gospel and soul music from 1957 to 1969. Commencing releasing albums as a solo artist in 1969, Mavis Staples has released 13 studio albums, two live albums, three compilations, one soundtrack, one EP, and 51 singles over a career spanning five decades.

== Albums ==
=== Studio albums ===
Title	Details	Peak chart positions							
Title	Details	US	BEL (FL)	NLD	NZ	SCO	SWE	SWI	UK Down.
Mavis Staples	Released: June 16, 1969; Label: Volt; Formats: CD, LP, cassette, digital download, streaming	—	—	—	—	—	—	—	—
Only for the Lonely	Released: October 12, 1970; Label: Volt; Formats: CD, LP, cassette, digital download, streaming	188	—	—	—	—	—	—	—
Oh What a Feeling	Released: July 16, 1979; Label: Warner Bros.; Formats: CD, LP, digital download, streaming	—	—	—	—	—	—	—	—
Time Waits for No One	Released: May 19, 1989; Label: Paisley Park; Formats: CD, LP, cassette, digital download, streaming	—	—	79	—	—	—	—	—
The Voice	Released: August 24, 1993; Label: Paisley Park; Formats: CD, cassette, digital download, streaming	—	—	—	—	—	—	—	—
Spirituals & Gospel: Dedicated to Mahalia Jackson (with Lucky Peterson)	Released: November 5, 1996; Label: Verve; Formats: CD, cassette, digital download, streaming	—	—	—	—	—	—	—	—
Have a Little Faith	Released: August 17, 2004; Label: ANTI-; Formats: CD, LP, digital download, streaming	—	—	—	—	—	—	—	—
We'll Never Turn Back	Released: April 24, 2007; Label: ANTI-; Formats: CD, LP, digital download, streaming	180	56	40	—	—	14	—	— (Note: We'll Never Turn Back did not enter the UK Album Downloads Chart, but peaked at number 14 on the UK Hip Hop and R&B Albums Chart)
You Are Not Alone	Released: September 14, 2010; Label: ANTI-; Formats: CD, LP, digital download, streaming	69	64	78	38	—	30	—	— (Note: You Are Not Alone did not enter the UK Album Downloads Chart, but peaked at number 27 on the UK Independent Albums Chart.)
One True Vine	Released: June 25, 2013; Label: ANTI-; Formats: CD, LP, digital download, streaming	67	130	47	36	—	33	—	— (Note: One True Vine did not enter the UK Album Downloads Chart, but peaked at number 35 on the Official Record Store Chart.)
Livin' on a High Note	Released: February 19, 2016; Label: ANTI-; Formats: CD, LP, digital download, streaming	— (Note: Livin' on a High Note did not enter the US Billboard 200, but it did peak at number 89 on the Current Album Sales chart.)	105	89	—	—	—	74	— (Note: Livin' on a High Note did not enter the UK Album Downloads Chart, but peaked at number 12 on the Official Record Store Chart.)
If All I Was Was Black	Released: November 17, 2017; Label: ANTI-; Formats: CD, LP, digital download, streaming	— (Note: If All I Was Was Black did not enter the US Billboard 200, but it did peak at number 94 on the Top Album Sales chart.)	106	—	— (Note: If All I Was Was Black did not enter the New Zealand Albums Chart, but peaked at number 10 on the New Zealand Heatseekers chart.)	—	—	—	— (Note: If All I Was Was Black did not enter the UK Album Downloads Chart, but peaked at number 21 on the Official Record Store Chart.)
We Get By	Released: May 24, 2019; Label: ANTI-; Formats: CD, LP, digital download, streaming	— (Note: We Get By did not enter the US Billboard 200, but it did peak at number 43 on the Top Album Sales chart.)	171	—	—	54	—	100	100
Sad and Beautiful World	Released: November 7, 2025; Label: ANTI-; Formats: CD, LP, digital download, streaming	— (Note: Sad and Beautiful World did not enter the US Billboard 200, but it did peak at number 46 on the Top Current Album Sales chart.)	125	—	—	45	—	68	23

=== Live albums ===
Title	Details	Peak chart positions		
Title	Details	US Gospel	US Blues	US Indie
Live: Hope at the Hideout	Released: November 4, 2008; Label: ANTI-; Formats: CD, digital download, streaming	17	—	—
Live in London	Released: February 8, 2019; Label: ANTI-; Formats: CD, LP, digital download, streaming	—	2	32
Carry Me Home	Released: March 20, 2022; Label: ANTI-; Formats: CD, LP, digital download, streaming	—	—	—

=== Soundtrack albums ===
Title	Details	Peak chart positions
Title	Details	US R&B
A Piece of the Action	Released: October 10, 1977; Label: Curtom; Formats: CD, LP, cassette, 8-track, digital download, streaming	51

=== Compilation albums ===
Title	Details
Don't Change Me Now	Released: August 25, 1988; Label: Stax, Volt; Formats: CD, LP, digital download, streaming
Mavis Staples / Only for the Lonely	Released: May 3, 1993; Label: Stax, Volt
Mavis Staples	Released: December 20, 1995; Label: HDH; Formats: CD, LP, cassette, digital download, streaming

=== Tribute albums ===
Title	Details
I'll Take You There: An All-Star Concert Celebration	Released: June 2, 2017; Label: Blackbird Presents; Formats: CD, LP, digital download, streaming

== Extended plays ==
Title	Album details	Peak chart positions
Title	Album details	US Gospel
Your Good Fortune	Released: April 21, 2015; Label: ANTI-	10

== Singles ==
=== As lead artist ===
Title	Year	Peak chart positions				Album
Title	Year	US	US R&B	US Gospel	US AAA	Album
"Crying in the Chapel" (with the Staple Singers)	1968	—	—	—	—	Non-album single
"Soul-A-Lujah" (with Johnnie Taylor, Eddie Floyd, William Bell, Pervis Staples, Carla Thomas and Cleotha Staples)	1969	—	—	—	—	Boy Meets Girl
"Never, Never Let You Go" (with Eddie Floyd)	1969	107	—	—	—	Boy Meets Girl
"Love's Sweet Sensation" (with William Bell)	1969	—	—	—	—	Boy Meets Girl
"You're Driving Me (To the Arms of a Stranger)"	1969	—	—	—	—	Mavis Staples
"I Have Learned to Do Without You"	1970	87	13	—	—	Only for the Lonely
"Endlessly"	1972	109	30	—	—	Only for the Lonely
"A Piece of the Action"	1977	—	47	—	—	A Piece of the Action (Soundtrack)
"Tonight I Feel Like Dancing"	1979	—	91	—	—	Oh What a Feeling
"Oh What a Feeling"	1979	—	—	—	—	Oh What a Feeling
"Love Gone Bad"	1983	—	—	—	—	Mavis Staples
"Show Me How It Works"	1986	—	68	—	—	Wildcats (Soundtrack)
"Oh Happy Day" (with Aretha Franklin)	1987	—	—	— (Note: "Oh Happy Day" did not enter the Hot Gospel Songs chart, but did peak at number 14 on the Gospel Digital Song Sales chart.)	—	One Lord, One Faith, One Baptism
"20th Century Express"	1989	—	—	—	—	Time Waits for No One
"Jaguar"	1989	—	—	—	—	Time Waits for No One
"Time Waits for No One"	1989	—	63	—	—	Time Waits for No One
"Christmas Vacation"	1989	—	—	— (Note: "Christmas Vacation" did not enter the Hot Gospel Songs chart, but did peak at number 19 on the Gospel Streaming Songs chart.)	—	Non-album single
"Melody Cool"	1990	—	36	—	—	Graffiti Bridge
"The Voice"	1993	—	—	—	—	The Voice
"Blood Is Thicker Than Time"	1993	—	—	—	—	The Voice
"Holding on to Your Love"	1994	—	—	—	—	Mavis Staples
"Step Into the Light"	2004	—	—	—	—	Have a Little Faith
"Have a Little Faith"	2004	—	—	—	—	Have a Little Faith
"God Is Not Sleeping"	2004	—	—	25	—	Have a Little Faith
"I'll Be Rested"	2007	—	—	—	—	We'll Never Turn Back
"On My Way"	2007	—	—	—	—	We'll Never Turn Back
"Down in Mississippi"	2007	—	—	—	—	We'll Never Turn Back
"Waiting for My Child" (Live)	2008	—	—	—	—	Live: Hope at the Hideout
"Freedom Highway" (Live)	2008	—	—	—	—	Live: Hope at the Hideout
"Wrote a Song for Everyone"	2010	—	—	—	—	You Are Not Alone
"I Belong to the Band"	2010	—	—	—	—	You Are Not Alone
"Black Stars (Come Back Home)"	2011	—	—	—	—	Willie Henderson & Friends Again
"Happy Xmas (War Is Over)" (with Sean Lennon, Jeff Tweedy, and the Harlem Gospel Choir)	2012	—	—	— (Note: "Happy Xmas (War Is Over)" did not enter the Hot Gospel Songs chart, but did peak at number three on the Gospel Digital Song Sales chart.)	—	Non-album single
"Can You Get to That"	2013	—	—	—	—	One True Vine
"I Like the Things About Me"	2013	—	—	—	—	One True Vine
"Your Good Fortune"	2015	—	—	—	—	Your Good Fortune
"Fight"	2015	—	—	—	—	Your Good Fortune
"High Note"	2016	—	—	—	—	Livin' on a High Note
"Love and Trust"	2016	—	—	—	—	Livin' on a High Note
"If All I Was Was Black"	2017	—	—	—	—	If All I Was Was Black
"Little Bit"	2017	—	—	—	—	If All I Was Was Black
"Build a Bridge"	2017	—	—	—	—	If All I Was Was Black
"Ain't No Doubt About It" (featuring Jeff Tweedy)	2017	—	—	—	—	If All I Was Was Black
"No Time for Cryin'" (Live)	2018	—	—	—	—	Live in London
"Love and Trust" (Live)	2019	—	—	—	—	Live in London
"Slippery People" (Live)	2019	—	—	—	—	Live in London
"Change"	2019	—	—	—	27	We Get By
"Anytime"	2019	—	—	—	—	We Get By
"We Get By" (featuring Ben Harper)	2019	—	—	—	—	We Get By
"I'll Be Gone" (with Norah Jones)	2019	—	—	—	—	Non-album singles
"All In It Together"	2020	—	—	—	—	Non-album singles
"Godspeed" (Frank Ocean cover)	2025	—	—	—	—	Sad and Beautiful World
"Beautiful Strangers" (Kevin Morby cover)	2025	—	—	—	—	Sad and Beautiful World
"Sad and Beautiful World" (Sparklehorse cover)	2025	—	—	—	—	Sad and Beautiful World
"Human Mind"	2025	—	—	— (Note: "Human Mind" did not enter the Billboard Hot Gospel Songs chart, but peaked at number 10 on the Gospel Digital Song Sales chart.)	20	Sad and Beautiful World

=== As featured artist ===
Title	Year	Peak chart positions						Album
Title	Year	US	US Rock	US AAA	US Rap Dig.	CAN Dig.	CAN Rock	Album
"I'll Take You There" (Bebe & Cece Winans featuring Mavis Staples)	1992	90	—	—	—	—	—	Different Lifestyles
"Build a Levee" (Natalie Merchant featuring Mavis Staples)	2002	—	—	17	—	—	—	Motherland
"I Give You Power" (Arcade Fire featuring Mavis Staples)	2017	—	33	18	—	39	40	Non-album single
"Witness" (Benjamin Booker featuring Mavis Staples)	2017	—	—	29	—	—	—	Witness
"Let Me Out" (Gorillaz featuring Pusha T and Mavis Staples)	2017	— (Note: "Let Me Out" did not enter the Billboard Hot 100, but did peak at number 15 on the Bubbling Under Hot 100 extension chart.)	7	—	14	50	—	Humanz
"Nina Cried Power" (Hozier featuring Mavis Staples)	2018	—	13	1	—	—	27	Wasteland, Baby!

== Other charted songs ==
Title	Year	Peak chart positions	Album
Title	Year	US Gospel Dig.	Album
"Wrote a Song for Everyone"	2010	14	You Are Not Alone
"You Are Not Alone"	2010	2	You Are Not Alone
"Every Step"	2015	20	One True Vine
"I'll Take You There (Encore)"	2017	9	Live: Hope at the Hideout

== Other appearances ==
Title	Year	Album
"I Ain't Particular" (William Bell and Mavis Staples)	1969	Girl Meets Boy
"Ain't That Good" (Eddie Floyd and Mavis Staples)	1969	Girl Meets Boy
"I Thank You" (William Bell and Mavis Staples)	1969	Girl Meets Boy
"Hold on This Time" (William Bell and Mavis Staples)	1969	Girl Meets Boy
"That's the Way Love Is" (Johnnie Taylor and Mavis Staples)	1969	Girl Meets Boy
"Piece of My Heart" (Eddie Floyd and Mavis Staples)	1969	Girl Meets Boy
"Leave the Girl Alone" (William Bell and Mavis Staples)	1969	Girl Meets Boy
"Strung Out" (William Bell and Mavis Staples)	1969	Girl Meets Boy
"We Need Power" (Live) (Aretha Franklin and Mavis Staples)	1987	One Lord, One Faith, One Baptism
"Packing Up, Getting Ready to Go" (Live) (Aretha Franklin, Mavis Staples, Joe Ligon and the Franklin Sisters)	1987	One Lord, One Faith, One Baptism
"A Song for You"	1991	Music Of Quality And Distinction, Vol. 2
"We Will" (David Robertson featuring Mavis Staples)	1994	Soul Embrace
"Turn It Around"	1996	In Harmony with the Homeless
"Gotta Serve Somebody"	1996	Tangled Up in Blues: Songs of Bob Dylan - This Ain't No Tribute
"Gonna Change My Way of Thinking" (Bob Dylan and Mavis Staples)	2003	Gotta Serve Somebody: The Gospel Songs of Bob Dylan
"When the Saints Go Marching In" (Dr. John featuring Mavis Staples)	2004	N'Awlinz: Dis Dat or D'Udda
"Lay My Burden Down" (Dr. John featuring Mavis Staples and the Dirty Dozen Brass Band)	2004	N'Awlinz: Dis Dat or D'Udda
"See That My Grave Is Kept Clean"	2004	Lightning in a Bottle: A One Night History of the Blues
"Men Are Just Like Street Cars" (Natalie Cole, Mavis Staples and Ruth Brown)	2004	Lightning in a Bottle: A One Night History of the Blues
"Hard Times Come Again No More"	2004	Beautiful Dreamer: The Songs of Stephen Foster
"Touch My Heart"	2004	Touch My Heart: A Tribute to Johnny Paycheck
"You Must Have That True Religion"	2005	I Believe to My Soul
"Keep on Pushing"	2005	I Believe to My Soul
"That's Enough" (Mavis Staples and Billy Preston)	2005	I Believe to My Soul
"God Is Not Sleeping" (Live)	2005	Broadcasts. Vol. 13
"Take a Look at Yourself"	2006	Willie Henderson & Friends Again
"Waiting for My Child to Come Home" (Mavis Staples and Patty Griffin)	2009	Oh Happy Day
"Respect Yourself" (Aaron Neville featuring Mavis Staples)	2013	Bring It on Home...The Soul Classics
"Move Along Train" (Live) (Mavis Staples and the Levon Helm Band)	2013	Love for Levon: A Benefit to Save the Barn
"Wish I Had Answered" (Mavis Staples with North Mississippi Allstars)	2014	Take Me to the River (Music from the Motion Picture)
"I've Been Buked" (Mavis Staples with North Mississippi Allstars)	2014	Take Me to the River (Music from the Motion Picture)
"Lay My Burden Down" (Live)	2016	The Musical Mojo of Dr. John; Celebrating Mac and His Music
"The Root" (Greenleaf Main Title Theme)	2016	Greenleaf: The Gospel Companion Soundtrack, Vol. 1
"The Root" (Main Title) (Remix)	2017	Greenleaf: Soundtrack, Vol. 2
"Why" (Dolly Parton and Mavis Staples)	2018	Dumplin' (Original Motion Picture Soundtrack)
"Pulling the Pin" (Run the Jewels featuring Mavis Staples and Josh Homme)	2020	Run the Jewels 4
"We Go Back" (Buddy Guy featuring Mavis Staples)	2022	The Blues Don't Lie

== Music videos ==
Title	Year
"Oh Happy Day" (Aretha Franklin and Mavis Staples)	1987
"Time Waits for No One"	1989
"The Voice"	1993
"I Like the Things About Me"	2013
"If All I Was Was Black"	2017
"Nina Cried Power" (Hozier featuring Mavis Staples)	2018
"No Time for Cryin'" (Live)	2018
"Love and Trust" (Live)	2019
"Slippery People" (Live)	2019
