= Build a Bridge =

Build a Bridge may refer to:

- Build a Bridge, a 2006 album by Audra McDonald
- "Build a Bridge", a song by Limp Bizkit from their 2003 album Results May Vary
- "Build a Bridge", a song by Mavis Staples from her 2017 album If All I Was Was Black
- Build a Bridge, a game by BoomBit Games with over 10M downloads.
