= Give, Get, Take and Have =

Studio album by Curtis Mayfield
- Released: 1976
- Genre: Funk; soul; disco
- Length: 31:50
- Label: Curtom
- Producer: Curtis Mayfield

Curtis Mayfield chronology
Sparkle (with Aretha Franklin) (1976)	Give, Get, Take and Have (1976)	A Piece of the Action (with Mavis Staples) (1977)

Give, Get, Take and Have is a studio album by Curtis Mayfield, released in 1976 under Curtom Records. The track "P.S. I Love You" was later featured in the film Superbad and on its accompanying soundtrack.

== Critical reception ==
Professional ratings
Review scores
Source	Rating
AllMusic	link
Christgau's Record Guide	B
Rolling Stone	(not rated) link

In Christgau's Record Guide: Rock Albums of the Seventies (1981), Robert Christgau said the album "meanders more than is conscionable" but was "most pleased to report that the opener, 'In My Arms Again,' is the first top-notch song [Mayfield]'s written for himself since 'Super Fly,' (somebody bad riffing on guitar—sounds like . . . Curtis Mayfield), and that the three that follow rock and roll."

== Track listing ==
All tracks composed by Curtis Mayfield.

No.	Title	Length
1.	"In Your Arms Again (Shake It)"	4:27
2.	"This Love Is Sweet"	3:11
3.	"P.S. I Love You"	4:00
4.	"Party Night"	3:48
5.	"Give a Little Bit (Give, Get, Take and Have)"	3:36
6.	"Soul Music"	4:01
7.	"Only You Babe"	4:23
8.	"Mr. Welfare Man"	5:36

== Personnel ==
- Rich Tufo - arrangements
- Fred Breitberg, Roger Anfinsen - engineer
- Ed Thrasher - art direction, photography
- Curtis Mayfield, Gary Thompson, Phil Upchurch - guitars
- Floyd Morris, Rich Tufo - keyboards
- Donnell Hagan - drums
- Joseph "Lucky" Scott - bass
- Henry Gibson - congas, percussion
