= Live in London (Mavis Staples album) =

Live album by Mavis Staples
- Released: February 8, 2019
- Recorded: July 9–10, 2018
- Venue: Union Chapel (London, England)
- Genre: R&B; soul
- Length: 56:29
- Label: Anti-
- Producer: Mavis Staples

Mavis Staples chronology
If All I Was Was Black (2017)	Live in London (2019)	We Get By (2019)

Singles from Live from London
- 1. "No Time for Cryin'" Released: November 5, 2018; 2. "Love and Trust" Released: January 21, 2019; 3. "Slippery People" Released: February 5, 2019

Live in London is the second live album by American R&B, soul and gospel singer Mavis Staples. It was released on February 8, 2019, by Anti-. The album was recorded on July 9 and 10, 2018, at Union Chapel in London, England.

== Background ==
The album was announced on November 5, 2018. The album is Staples first live album since 2008's Live at the Hideout. The album was recorded during two shows at London's Union Chapel in July 2018.

== Promotion and release ==
The first single from the album, "No Time for Cryin'", was released on November 5, 2018, along with the album's preorder. "Love and Trust" was released as the second single on January 21, 2019. The third and final single, "Slippery People", was released on February 5. All three singles were accompanied by live videos filmed at Union Chapel.

== Critical reception ==
Professional ratings
Aggregate scores
Source	Rating
Metacritic	79/100
Review scores
Source	Rating
AllMusic	4/5 stars
American Songwriter	4/5 stars
PopMatters	8/10 stars
Chicago Tribune	3/4 stars
Pitchfork	6.8/10

Live in London received generally favorable reviews upon release. At Metacritic, which assigns a normalized rating out of 100 to reviews from mainstream publications, the album received an average score of 79, based on 8 reviews.

== Track listing ==
No.	Title	Writer(s)	Length
1.	"Love and Trust"	Ben Harper	4:39
2.	"Who Told You That"	Jeff Tweedy	3:13
3.	"Slippery People"	David Byrne; Christopher Frantz; Jerry Harrison; Martina Weymouth	3:52
4.	"What You Gonna Do" (Intro)		0:37
5.	"What You Gonna Do"	Roebuck "Pops" Staples	4:06
6.	"Take Us Back"	Benjamin Booker	4:39
7.	"You Are Not Alone"	Tweedy	4:20
8.	"No Time for Cryin'"	Tweedy; Mavis Staples	5:22
9.	"Can You Get to That"	George Clinton; Ernie Harris	3:18
10.	"Let's Do It Again"	Curtis Mayfield	5:48
11.	"Dedicated"	Justin Vernon; Matthew Ward	4:47
12.	"We're Gonna Make It"	Gene Barge; Billy Davis; Raynard Miner; Carl William Smith	4:24
13.	"Encore: Happy Birthday"		1:01
14.	"Touch a Hand"	Homer Banks; Carl Hampton; Raymond Jackson	6:34
Total length:			56:29

== Personnel ==
Adapted from the album liner notes.

- Mavis Staples – vocals, producer
- Rick Holmstrom – guitar, background vocals
- Jeff Turmes – bass, background vocals
- Stephen Hodges – drums
- Donny Gerrard – background vocals
- Vicki Randle – background vocals
- Shelia Sachs – album design
- Rob Schnapf – mixing, editing
- Mark Chalecki – mastering
- Paul Hurt – recording
