= Hydraulic Groove =

Studio album by Rick Holmstrom
- Released: 2002
- Genre: Blues; electronica
- Length: 62:23
- Label: Tone-Cool
- Producer: Rick Holmstrom; Genome

Rick Holmstrom chronology
Gonna Get Wild (2000)	Hydraulic Groove (2002)	Live at the Cafe Boogaloo (2006)

Hydraulic Groove is an album by the American musician Rick Holmstrom, released in 2002. He posted several of the tracks to his web site prior to the album's release, to gauge the reaction of fans. Holmstrom supported the album with a North American tour.

== Production ==
The album was produced by Holmstrom and Genome. Holmstrom was backed by Ron Dziubla on saxophone, turntables, and keyboards; Donny Gruendler on drums; and Dale Jennings on bass. He used samples, backwards guitar, effects, signal processing, and drum loops on some of the tracks; he spent weeks helping to edit the music. Holmstrom was inspired in part by working on R. L. Burnside's Wish I Was in Heaven Sitting Down, which used basic blues tracks that were then electronically manipulated. Holmstrom also appreciated Moby's use of samples on Play. Many tracks were recorded or mixed by Rob Schnapf. Holmstrom sought to retain the "greasy" feel of the basic tracks, while also avoiding the overly-produced sound of late-eighties and early-nineties blues records. Donny Gerrard contributed backing vocals to the album; John Medeski played keyboards on a couple of tracks. "These Roads" samples the work of Robert Ward. "Shake It, Part 2" contains a snippet of a live performance by Rufus Thomas. "Pee Wee's Nightmare" is an homage to Pee Wee Crayton. In 2010, Holmstrom questioned whether the album's combination of blues sounds and electronica was an artistic success.

== Critical reception ==
Professional ratings
Review scores
Source	Rating
The Ottawa Citizen	4.5/5 stars
The Penguin Guide to Blues Recordings	2.5/4 stars
The Press of Atlantic City	3/4 stars
Winston-Salem Journal	3/4 stars

Guitar Player stated that "Holmstrom's solos have fangs, and whether he's tearing up Chicago blues, rockabilly, New Orleans funk, or his own brand of psychedelic lounge-jazz ... Holmstrom's toothy tone keeps each one of these addictive grooves centered on the blues." Billboard labeled the album "dub blues" and "blues for the avant mind." The Ottawa Citizen opined that "Holmstrom's trademark coiled-wire guitar and economical vocals are the epitome of the blues."

The Lincoln Journal Star compared Holmstrom to Beck, but thought that "Holmstrom's grounding in tradition gives his music even deeper roots than that of young Mr. Hansen and makes its avant-garde turn even more stunning." The Intelligencer Journal called the album "an ear-opener, breathing life into a musical form that is too often treated with the stifling reverence reserved for a museum piece." The Chicago Tribune listed Hydraulic Groove as the fifth best blues album of 2002, concluding that "[thousands of] guitarists practice the art of solo improvisation in blues today, but few are as effectively forward-thinking as ... Holmstrom."

== Track listing ==
Hydraulic Groove track listing
No.	Title	Length
1.	"These Roads"	3:40
2.	"Bobo the Hobo"	4:48
3.	"Last to Know"	4:32
4.	"Pee Wee's Nightmare"	5:10
5.	"Shake It, Part 2"	3:44
6.	"My Maria"	3:44
7.	"Back It Up"	3:13
8.	"Gravy"	3:11
9.	"Harlan Shuffle"	3:38
10.	"Tell Me"	2:59
11.	"I'm Gone"	3:36
12.	"Roll Tape"	5:23
13.	"Shake It, Part 2" (DJ Logic Remix)	3:45
14.	"Knock Yourself Out" (Genome Remix)	2:56
15.	"Hamp's Hump"	8:04
Total length:		62:23
