= We Get By =

Studio album by Mavis Staples
- Released: May 24, 2019
- Studio: Henson (Hollywood)
- Genre: R&B; soul
- Length: 36:52
- Label: Anti-
- Producer: Ben Harper

Mavis Staples chronology
Live in London (2019)	We Get By (2019)	Carry Me Home (2022)

Singles from We Get By
- 1. "Change" Released: March 20, 2019; 2. "Anytime" Released: April 17, 2019; 3. "We Get By" Released: May 15, 2019

Professional ratings
Aggregate scores
Source	Rating
AnyDecentMusic?	7.7/10
Metacritic	82/100
Review scores
Source	Rating
AllMusic	4/5 stars
American Songwriter	4.5/5 stars
Exclaim!	8/10
The Guardian	4/5 stars
Mojo	4/5 stars
Q	4/5 stars
Pitchfork	7.5/10
Rolling Stone	3.5/5 stars
Uncut	8/10
Under the Radar	8/10

We Get By is the fourteenth studio album by American R&B, soul and gospel singer Mavis Staples. It was released on May 24, 2019, by Anti-.

The album's cover features the photograph "Outside Looking In" by Gordon Parks from his 1956 photo essay The Restraints: Open and Hidden. The album was chosen as a 'Favorite Blues Album' by AllMusic.

== Background ==
The album was announced on March 20, 2019. It was produced and written by Ben Harper. Staples and Harper had previously collaborated on "Love and Trust", a song from Staples' 2016 album, Livin' on a High Note. The album's lead single, "Change", was released on the same day, along with the album's pre-order. In a statement, Staples said, "These songs are delivering such a strong message. We truly need to make a change if we want this world to be better."

== Track listing ==
All tracks are written by Ben Harper; music on "Anytime" composed with Jason Mozersky.

No.	Title	Length
1.	"Change"	2:56
2.	"Anytime"	2:48
3.	"We Get By" (featuring Ben Harper)	3:35
4.	"Brothers and Sisters"	3:33
5.	"Heavy on My Mind"	3:40
6.	"Sometime"	2:40
7.	"Never Needed Anyone"	3:37
8.	"Stronger"	3:14
9.	"Chance on Me"	3:30
10.	"Hard to Leave"	3:06
11.	"One More Change"	4:13
Total length:		36:52

== Personnel ==
Credits adapted from the album's liner notes.

- Mavis Staples – vocals, co-production
- Ben Harper – production
- Rick Holmstrom – guitar, co-production
- Jeff Turmes – bass, co-production
- Stephen Hodges – drums, co-production
- Donny Gerrard – vocals, co-production
- C.C. White – backing vocals
- Laura Mace – backing vocals
- Ethan Allen – co-production, recording, mixing
- Matt Tuggle – engineering assistance
- Gordon Parks – cover photograph ("Outside Looking In")

== Charts ==
Chart (2019)	Peak position
Belgian Albums (Ultratop Flanders)	171
Belgian Albums (Ultratop Wallonia)	114
French Albums (SNEP)	113
Scottish Albums (OCC)	54
Swiss Albums (Schweizer Hitparade)	100
