= Sad and Beautiful World =

2025 album by Mavis Staples

Studio album by Mavis Staples
- Released: November 7, 2025
- Studios: Lost Boy; Chicago Recording Company; Studio D
- Genres: Gospel; soul; folk; blues
- Length: 38:17
- Label: Anti-
- Producer: Brad Cook

Mavis Staples chronology
Carry Me Home (2022)	Sad and Beautiful World (2025)

Singles from Sad and Beautiful World
- 1. "Godspeed" Released: June 10, 2025; 2. "Beautiful Strangers" Released: August 26, 2025; 3. "Sad and Beautiful World" Released: September 30, 2025; 4. "Human Mind" Released: November 3, 2025

Sad and Beautiful World is the fourteenth solo studio album by American R&B and gospel singer Mavis Staples. The album was released on November 7, 2025, via Anti-, to digital download, streaming, CD, and LP formats. It was produced by Brad Cook and features songwriting credits from Allison Russell, Andrew Hozier-Byrne, Curtis Mayfield, David Rawlings, Eddie Hinton, Frank Ocean, Gillian Welch, Jack Rhodes, Malay, Kathleen Brennan, Kevin Morby, Leonard Cohen, Mark Linkous, Red Hayes, and Tom Waits. The album is composed almost exclusively of covers, and features songs by artists including Mayfield, Hinton, Ocean, Welch, Morby, Cohen, Waits, Sparklehorse, and Porter Wagoner.

Sad and Beautiful World was supported by the releases of four singles, "Godspeed" on June 10, 2025, "Beautiful Strangers" on August 26, 2025, "Sad and Beautiful World" on September 30, 2025, and "Human Mind" on November 3, 2025. "Human Mind" peaked at number 20 on the Billboard Adult Alternative Airplay chart and number 10 on the Gospel Digital Song Sales chart. The album was also supported by a tour of the United States, which began in late 2025 and lasted until early 2026.

Sad and Beautiful World was praised by critics, many of whom appreciated the album's production style and emotional impact. It appeared on several year-end lists of 2025, and the songs "Beautiful Strangers" and "Godspeed" each received awards at the 2026 Grammy Awards, and at the 2027 Grammy Awards the songs "Human Mind" and "Sad and Beautiful World" received nominations. The album itself received Grammy nominations for Best Americana Album and Best Album Cover, and at the 2026 Libera Awards received the award of Best Soul/Funk Record and a nomination for Record of the Year. The album was commercially successful, debuting in the top-50 on multiple charts, both in the United States and internationally. In the United States, the album debuted at number 46 on the Billboard Top Current Album Sales chart, number 2 on the Top Blues Albums chart, and number 5 on the Top Gospel Albums chart. It also received notable attention in the United Kingdom.

== Release and promotion ==
The lead single from Sad and Beautiful World, titled "Godspeed", was released on June 10, 2025. The following single, "Beautiful Strangers", was released on August 26, 2025. With the release of "Beautiful Strangers", Sad and Beautiful World was announced. The title track, "Sad and Beautiful World", was released on September 30, 2025, as the album's third single, and "Human Mind" was released on November 3, 2025, as the album's fourth. In support of the album, Staples toured the United States from September 2025 to February 2026.

== Development ==
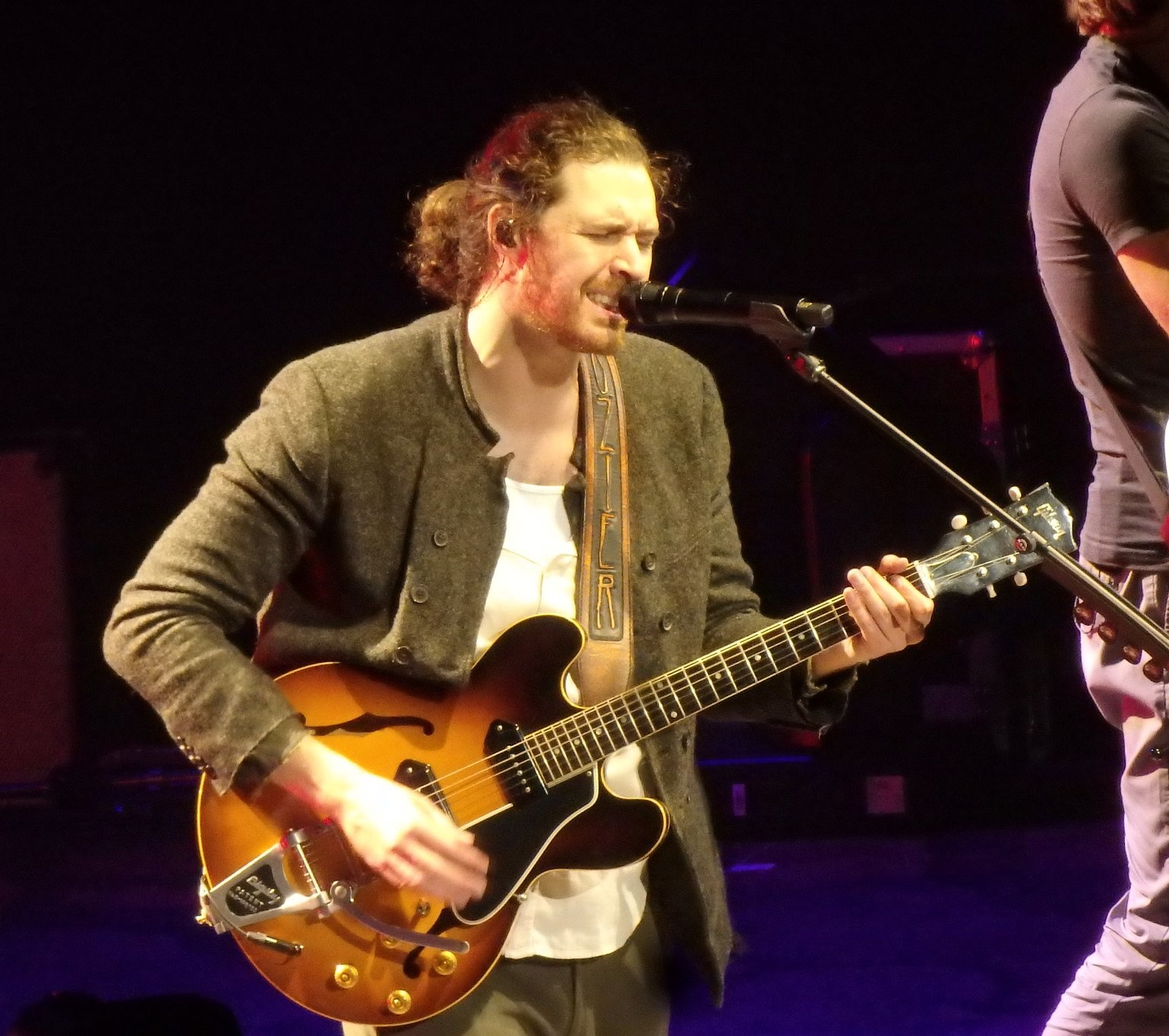
Hozier (pictured) and Allison Russell wrote "Human Mind", the only original track on Sad and Beautiful World.

=== Lyrics and theme ===
Sad and Beautiful World consists almost entirely of covers, with "Human Mind" being the only original track on the album.

Critics observed that Sad and Beautiful World continues Staples' long‑standing engagement with themes of social conscience, resilience, and spiritual perseverance. Jim Hynes of Glide wrote that the album reflects "these times of protest and divisiveness," observing that Staples' performances convey "conviction and earned wisdom in every word she sings." It was also emphasized the album's themes balanced between both sorrow and hope. Steve Horowitz of PopMatters described Staples' voice as "honeyed," noting that "there is a sweetness that comes across even as she sings about war and injustice." Jonathan Bernstein of Rolling Stone similarly argued that the record functions as a late‑career attempt at optimism, calling it "a document of a legend brimming with life even as they directly confront their own mortality." Overall, the album was observed to contain tension between grief and perseverance. Janne Oinonen of The Line of Best Fit identified a sense of "battered hopefulness," arguing that Staples' performances demonstrate "a determination to stand firm in the belief in [the] essential goodness of humanity against often overwhelming evidence to the contrary."

=== Styles and composition ===
The album demonstrates the styles of gospel, soul, folk, and blues. Critics praised Staples' ability to reinterpret material across genres and eras. Bernstein noted that the album "transforms disparate material across genres and decades… into her most powerful statement as a solo artist in more than a decade," while David Hutcheon of Mojo noted that the selections "tell both her story and the stories she needs to tell." Several critics commented on the combination of both Staples and guest musicians. Oinonen identified "Chicago" as the album’s most sonically forceful moment, making note of the "gnarly, biting duelling guitars of Derek Trucks and 89‑year‑old Chicago Blues legend Buddy Guy," and called it "a bravura performance from all concerned."

Overall, reviewers characterized the album's musical style as roots‑oriented, centered around Staples' vocals. Bernstein summarized the effect by noting that her voice "has only gathered gravitas and richness," allowing her to "explore, rediscover, and poke holes at her lifetime of righteous optimism."

=== Recording and production ===
"Human Mind"
"Human Mind" demonstrates the album's acclaimed "rich and warm" production style.

Reviewers widely praised Cook's production, which centered Staples' voice. It was acclaimed that he "smartly recorded Staples' voice first with minimum accompaniment before adding an all-star roster of background singers and players," a method that several critics said preserved the intimacy and clarity of her delivery. Oinonen wrote that Cook "wisely never shifts the spotlight from Staples' vocal," describing the arrangements as "rich and warm but never… cluttered or excessively busy." Hutcheon wrote that the album's contributors "share a knack for keeping out of sight, leaving the focus on Staples." Cook featured a number of various musicians on the album, including Justin Vernon, Katie Crutchfield, MJ Lenderman, Patterson Hood, Sam Beam, and Jeff Tweedy. Hynes described the album as a "major call for unity," comparing its multigenerational cast to "that proverbial big gospel tent."

== Reception ==
Professional ratings
Aggregate scores
Source	Rating
AnyDecentMusic?	8.3/10
Metacritic	90/100
Review scores
Source	Rating
AllMusic	4/5 stars
Classic Rock	8/10
Glide Magazine	8/10
Mojo	5/5 stars
PopMatters	9/10
Record Collector	4/5 stars
Rolling Stone	4/5 stars
The Line of Best Fit	8/10
Uncut	9/10
Under the Radar	8/10 stars

=== Critical ===
Sad and Beautiful World was met with widespread acclaim from music critics upon its release. At Metacritic, which assigns a normalized rating out of 100 to reviews from mainstream critics, the album has an average score of 90, based on fourteen reviews, indicating "universal acclaim".

Andy Kellman of AllMusic highlighted Sad and Beautiful World as an emotional return for Staples, emphasizing both the strength of her interpretive abilities and the clarity of Cook's production. He labelled "Human Mind" as a standout track for its personal lyrics. The remainder of the album's material was praised for suiting Staples' voice naturally. Kellman observed that the album contained loss, perseverance, and social conscience. He praised the record's blend of gospel, blues, country, soul, and rock.

Jonathan Bernstein of Rolling Stone characterized Sad and Beautiful World as a distinguished late-career release that underscores Mavis Staples' long standing reputation as an exceptional interpreter of song. Bernstein observed that Staples reimagines material spanning multiple genres and eras, while maintaining a cohesive style. Bernstein went on to described the album as both a retrospective survey of her seven-decade career. He also emphasized Cook's restrained production approach, which was noted for being well-blended with Staples' vocals.

=== Commercial ===
Sad and Beautiful World contained two charted songs, the first of which being "Human Mind", which impacted adult alternative-formatted radio stations in the United States after being released to radio on November 3, 2025. The song debuted at number 37 on Billboard's Adult Alternative Airplay chart for the chart week dated to November 29, 2025. In the chart week dated to January 31, 2026, the song rose 21-20 to reach its peak on the chart. It remained on the chart for fourteen weeks. On the Gospel Digital Song Sales chart, the song peaked at number 10, and remained on the chart for one week. The album track "Chicago" peaked at number 4 on the UK Christian Songs chart.

The album itself received prominent commercial success, both in the United States and internationally. On the Ultratop Flanders' Belgian Albums chart, the album debuted at number 125, and on the Official Charts Company's Scottish Albums chart, it debuted at number 45. In the UK, the album did not enter the Official Albums Chart; however, it did achieve peaks of number 23 on the Official Album Downloads Chart, number 7 on the Official Americana Albums Chart, and number 16 on the Official Independent Albums Chart. It also peaked at number 43 on the Official Album Sales Chart and number 48 on the Official Physical Albums Chart. In the United States, the album did not enter the overall Billboard 200 chart or supportive Top Album Sales chart, but peaked at number 46 on the Top Current Album Sales chart, number 2 on the Top Blues Albums chart, and number 5 on the Top Gospel Albums chart.

=== Industry awards ===
==== Album ====
Year	Organization	Category	Result	Ref.
2026	Libera Awards	Record of the Year	Nominated	
2026	Libera Awards	Best Soul/Funk Record	Won	
2027	Grammy Awards	Best Americana Album	Pending	
2027	Grammy Awards	Best Album Cover	Pending	

==== Song-specific ====
Year	Organization	Nominee / work	Category	Result	Ref.
2026	Grammy Awards	"Beautiful Strangers"	Best American Roots Performance	Won	
2026	Grammy Awards	"Godspeed"	Best Americana Performance	Won	
2027	Grammy Awards	"Human Mind"	Best American Roots Performance	Pending	
2027	Grammy Awards	"Sad and Beautiful World"	Best Americana Performance	Pending	

=== Year-end lists ===
Year-end lists
Publication	Accolade	Rank	Ref.
Glide Magazine	20 Best Albums of 2025	—N/a	
Metacritic	Best Music and Albums for 2025	8	
Mojo	50 Best Albums of 2025	15	
Rolling Stone	100 Best Albums of 2025	67	
So It Goes	STE's Best Albums of 2025	32	
The New York Times	20 Best Albums of 2025	20	

== Track listing ==
Sad and Beautiful World track listing
No.	Title	Writer(s)	Original artist(s)	Length
1.	"Chicago"	Tom Waits; Kathleen Brennan	Tom Waits	2:38
2.	"Beautiful Strangers"	Kevin Morby	Kevin Morby	5:58
3.	"Sad and Beautiful World"	Mark Linkous	Sparklehorse	4:06
4.	"Human Mind"	Andrew Hozier-Byrne; Allison Russell	Mavis Staples	3:12
5.	"Hard Times"	David Todd Rawlings; Gillian Welch	Gillian Welch	4:45
6.	"Godspeed"	Christopher Breaux; James Ho	Frank Ocean	2:50
7.	"We Got to Have Peace"	Curtis Mayfield	Curtis Mayfield	3:33
8.	"Anthem"	Leonard Cohen	Leonard Cohen	3:04
9.	"Satisfied Mind"	Jack Rhodes; Red Hayes	Porter Wagoner	3:47
10.	"Everybody Needs Love"	Eddie Hinton	Eddie Hinton	4:24
Total length:				38:17

== Personnel ==
Credits adapted from the album's liner notes.

=== Musicians ===
- Mavis Staples – lead vocals
- Phil Cook – acoustic guitar (tracks 1, 4, 9), piano (2–9), organ (4, 5, 7, 9, 10); electric guitar, Wurlitzer (4); synthesizers (6, 8)
- Brad Cook – drum programming (1, 4), bass synthesizer (1), vibraphone (2), acoustic guitar (3, 4), bass (3, 4, 7–10), synthesizers (3, 7, 8), tambourine (5), horn arrangement (6)
- Matt McCaughan – drums (1–4, 6), percussion (1, 7), OP-1 bass (2), drum programming (4, 6), synthesizers (7)
- Matt Douglas – saxophone (1–4, 6, 8)
- Rick Holmstrom – electric guitar (1, 2, 4, 7, 9, 10)
- Sam Beam – background vocals (1)
- Buddy Guy – electric guitar (1)
- MJ Lenderman – electric guitar (2, 3, 8), background vocals (3), drums (8, 10), acoustic guitar (10)
- Nathan Stocker – acoustic guitar (2, 6–8), electric guitar (6–8), synthesizers (7)
- Nathaniel Rateliff – background vocals (2, 10)
- Tré Burt – harmony vocals (2)
- Colin Croom – pedal steel (3, 9)
- Amy Ray – background vocals (3)
- Anjimile – background vocals (4, 8)
- Kara Jackson – background vocals (5, 8), outro poem (6)
- Spencer Tweedy – drums (5, 9)
- Katie Crutchfield – background vocals (5, 10)
- Derek Trucks – slide guitar (5)
- Jeff Tweedy – bass (5)
- Will Miller – EVI bass synthesizer (6, 7), trumpet (6, 8)
- Trevor Hagen – trumpet (6)
- Eric Burton – harmony vocals (7)
- Andrew Marlin – mandolin (7)
- Justin Vernon – background vocals (9)
- Bonnie Raitt – background vocals, slide guitar (10)
- Patterson Hood – background vocals (10)
- Andy Kaulkin – piano (10)

=== Technical and visuals ===
- Brad Cook – production, engineering (all tracks); mixing (1–9)
- Paul Voran – engineering (all tracks), mixing (1–9)
- Justin Vernon – additional engineering
- Tom Schick – additional engineering
- Joel Jaffe – additional engineering
- Mathieu Lejeune – additional engineering
- Jonathan Lackey – additional engineering
- Brian Hernandez – additional engineering assistance
- Jimmy Mahoney – additional engineering assistance
- Chris Shaw – mixing (10)
- Tim Smiley – mastering
- Elizabeth De La Piedra – photography
- Trevor Hernandez – layout, design
- Lauren N. Bailey – layout, design

== Charts ==
Chart performance for Sad and Beautiful World
Chart (2025)	Peak position
Belgian Albums (Ultratop Flanders)	125
Scottish Albums (Official Charts)	45
Swiss Albums (Schweizer Hitparade)	68
UK Album Downloads (Official Charts)	23
UK Americana Albums (Official Charts)	7
UK Independent Albums (Official Charts)	16
US Top Blues Albums (Billboard)	2
US Top Current Album Sales (Billboard)	46
US Top Gospel Albums (Billboard)	5

== Release history ==
Release history and formats for Sad and Beautiful World
Region	Date	Format(s)	Label(s)	Ref.
Various	November 7, 2025	Digital download; streaming; CD; LP	ANTI-	
