= You Are Not Alone (Mavis Staples album) =

Studio album by Mavis Staples
- Released: September 14, 2010
- Recorded: 2010
- Studio: The Wilco Loft (Chicago)
- Length: 45:13
- Label: Anti-
- Producer: Jeff Tweedy

Mavis Staples chronology
Live: Hope at the Hideout (2008)	You Are Not Alone (2010)	One True Vine (2013)

Professional ratings
Aggregate scores
Source	Rating
Metacritic	81/100
Review scores
Source	Rating
AllMusic	3.5/5 stars
The A.V. Club	A−
Billboard	4.5/5 stars
Chicago Tribune	3.5/4 stars
Entertainment Weekly	A−
Paste	9.1/10
Pitchfork	8.2/10
PopMatters	7/10
Rolling Stone	3.5/5 stars
Spin	6/10

You Are Not Alone is the eighth studio album by American gospel and soul singer Mavis Staples, released September 14, 2010, through Anti-. It won the Grammy Award for Best Americana Album at the 53rd Grammy Awards.

== Reception ==
At Metacritic, which assigns a normalized rating out of 100 to reviews from mainstream critics, the album received an average score of 81, based on 16 reviews, which indicates "universal acclaim".

== Track listing ==
You Are Not Alone track listing
No.	Title	Writer(s)	Length
1.	"Don't Knock"	Roebuck Staples	2:30
2.	"You Are Not Alone"	Jeff Tweedy	3:57
3.	"Downward Road"	R. Staples	3:08
4.	"In Christ There Is No East or West"	Traditional; Tweedy^{[a]}	3:36
5.	"Creep Along Moses"	Traditional; Tweedy^{[a]}	2:57
6.	"Losing You"	Randy Newman	2:52
7.	"I Belong to the Band"	Reverend Gary Davis	3:31
8.	"Last Train"	Allen Toussaint	4:29
9.	"Only the Lord Knows"	Tweedy	3:44
10.	"Wrote a Song for Everyone"	John Fogerty	3:47
11.	"We're Gonna Make It"	Gene Barge; Billy Davis; Raynard Miner; Carl William Smith	3:27
12.	"Wonderful Savior"	Traditional; Mavis Staples^{[a]}	2:05
13.	"Too Close / On My Way to Heaven"	Alex Bradford Jr.^{[b]}; R. Staples^{[b]}	5:10
Total length:			45:13

=== Notes ===
- ^{^[a]} signifies an arranger.
- ^{^[b]} Bradford is credited for writing "Too Close" and Staples is credited for writing "On My Way to Heaven".

== Personnel ==
Credits adapted from the album's liner notes.

- Mavis Staples – lead vocals
- Rick Holmstrom – guitar (all tracks), background vocals (track 11)
- Jeff Turmes – bass, guitar (all tracks); second guitar (1), background vocals (11)
- Stephen Hodges – drums, percussion
- Donny Gerrard – vocals
- Jeff Tweedy – production (all tracks), bass (1), acoustic guitar (2, 4, 9, 10); fuzz guitar, background vocals (9)
- Tom Schick – engineering, mastering
- Mark Greenberg – engineering assistance (all tracks), celeste (2), vibraphone (4)
- Jason Tobias – additional engineering, technical support
- Nora O'Connor – background vocals (1–5, 7, 8, 10–13)
- Kelly Hogan – background vocals (1–3, 5, 8, 10–13)
- Patrick Sansone – Wurlitzer (2, 8, 11), piano (2, 9, 10), vibraphone (2); celeste, Mellotron (4); tambourine (7), organ (8, 11), background vocals (9)
- Richard Parenti – background vocals (4, 7)
- Chris Strong – photography
