= Live: Hope at the Hideout =

Live album by Mavis Staples
- Released: November 4, 2008
- Recorded: June 23, 2008
- Venue: The Hideout Inn
- Genre: R&B, gospel
- Label: Anti-

Mavis Staples chronology
We'll Never Turn Back (2007)	Live: Hope at the Hideout (2008)	You Are Not Alone (2010)

Professional ratings
Review scores
Source	Rating
AllMusic	3/5 stars
Pitchfork	7.6/10

Live: Hope at the Hideout is the first live album by Mavis Staples. It was recorded at Chicago's Hideout. The album was nominated for Best Contemporary Blues Album at the 52nd Annual Grammy Awards (held on January 31, 2010). The album was recorded at The Hideout Inn in Staples' hometown of Chicago.

== Track listing ==
1. "For What's It's Worth" – 2:52
2. "Eyes on the Prize" – 5:21
3. "Down in Mississippi" – 4:32
4. "Wade in the Water" – 6:34
5. "Waiting for My Child" – 4:27
6. "This Little Light" – 4:48
7. "Why Am I Treated So Bad" – 8:18
8. "Freedom Highway" – 4:37
9. "We Shall Not Be Moved" – 7:46
10. "Circle Intro (Encore)" – 3:02
11. "Will the Circle Be Unbroken (Encore)" – 6:01
12. "On My Way (Encore)" – 6:01
13. "I'll Take You There (Encore)" – 4:19

== Personnel ==
- Mavis Staples – vocals
- Rick Holmstrom – guitar
- Jeff Turmes – bass
- Stephen Hodges – drums
- Chavonne Morris – backing vocals
- Donny Gerrard – backing vocals
- Yvonne Staples – backing vocals
