= Only for the Lonely =

Studio album by Mavis Staples
- Released: October 12, 1970
- Studio: Stax Recording Company; Muscle Shoals Sound Studio; A&R Recording Studios
- Genre: R&B; soul
- Length: 28:12
- Label: Volt
- Producer: Don Davis

Mavis Staples chronology
Mavis Staples (1969)	Only for the Lonely (1970)	A Piece of the Action (1977)

Singles from Only for the Lonely
- 1. "I Have Learned to Do Without You" Released: June 1970; 2. "Endlessly" Released: August 1972

Only for the Lonely is the second solo studio by American rhythm and blues and gospel singer Mavis Staples. It was released on October 12, 1970, by Volt Records.

== Critical reception ==
Professional ratings
Review scores
Source	Rating
AllMusic	4/5 stars

In the Billboard issue dated October 24, 1970, a review was published saying, "This album is at once dramatic and sensuous, and warm and appealing. Mavis Staples is cast in the same mold that produced recording greats like Aretha Franklin, Nancy Wilson and Etta James, and she can really deliver a song. Included here are "It Makes Me Want to Cry," "How Many Times," "Since I Fell for You" and "Endlessly".

Cashbox published a review of the album in the issue dated October 31, 1970, which said, "Mavis Staples is a brilliant songstress with an incredibly powerful voice. Listening to her perform on an album, one cannot help but feel that she is in fact performing live in your living room. "I Have Learned to Do Without You," "Endlessly," "Since I Fell for You," and "It Makes Me Wanna Cry," are among the more impressive cuts, but each is a gem in its own right. For Mavis, it's the second release in a bright, shining career."

== Track listing ==
Side one
No.	Title	Writer(s)	Length
1.	"I Have Learned to Live Without You"	David Jordan; Don Davis; J. J. Barnes	4:09
2.	"How Many Times"	George Soule; Oscar Franck; Terry Woodford	3:21
3.	"Endlessly"	Brook Benton; Clyde Otis	3:08
4.	"You're the Fool"	Sharon McMahan	2:40

Side two
No.	Title	Writer(s)	Length
1.	"Since I Fell for You"	Buddy Johnson	3:34
2.	"What Happened to the Real Me"	Helga Penzabene	2:35
3.	"Since You Became a Part of My Life"	Bobby Eaton; Fred Bridges; Richard Knight	3:30
4.	"It Makes Me Wanna Cry"	Davis; Homer Banks	2:50
5.	"Don't Change Me Now"	Darryl Carter; Fred Briggs; Sam Ballard	2:25

2001 CD reissue bonus tracks
No.	Title	Writer(s)	Original release	Length
10.	"Security"	Otis Redding	Mavis Staples (1969)	2:47
11.	"Son of a Preacher Man"	John Hurley; Ronnie Wilkins	Mavis Staples (1969)	2:17
12.	"You Send Me"	L.C. Cook	Mavis Staples (1969)	2:56
13.	"A House Is Not a Home"	Burt Bacharach; Hal Davis	Mavis Staples (1969)	4:27
14.	"That's the Way Love Is" (with Johnnie Taylor)	Deadric Malone	Boy Meets Girl (1969)	2:24
Total length:				43:03

== Personnel ==
Adapted from the album liner notes.

- Barry Beckett, Rudy Robinson - keyboards
- Joel Brodsky - photography
- Vernon Bullock - guitar, keyboards
- Ron Capone - engineer
- Steve Cropper, Eddie Hinton, Ray Monette - guitar
- Don Davis - engineer
- Donald Dunn, David Hood, Tony Newton - bass guitar
- Eli Fountain - percussion, saxophone
- Marlin Greene - engineer
- Don Hahn - producer, engineer
- Roger Hawkins, Al Jackson Jr., George McGregor - drums
- Isaac Hayes - organ
- David Krieger - art direction
- Herb Kole - art supervisor
- Horace Ott - string arrangements
- Paul Richmond - mastering
- Mavis Staples - lead vocals
- Marvell Thomas - piano
