= Have a Little Faith (Mavis Staples album) =

Studio album by Mavis Staples
- Released: August 17, 2004
- Genre: Soul, blues, gospel
- Length: 52:08
- Label: Alligator
- Producer: Jim Tullio, Mavis Staples

Mavis Staples chronology
| Spirituals & Gospel (1996) | Have a Little Faith (2004) | We'll Never Turn Back (2007) |

Have a Little Faith is the sixth solo studio album by the American soul and gospel singer Mavis Staples, which was released by Alligator Records on August 17, 2004.

The album was released after a hiatus of roughly eight years, during which Staples lost her father, singer, songwriter, and guitarist Roebuck "Pops" Staples, and stopped touring in order to deal with the illness of her sister Cleotha. Upon completing the recording, which she financed from her savings, she was turned down by a dozen labels before Alligator expressed interest. She recalled: "You have some companies don't want to sign older artists. It just happened that I finally got the message." "I made this record... with my own money and shopped it around. I thought, if I have to sell it out of the trunk of my car, I will." Regarding the album title, Staples commented: "all we need is a little faith, just about the size of a mustard seed."

Have a Little Faith initiated a period in which Staples returned to recording on a more regular basis, and in which there was a resurgence of interest in her work.

== Reception ==
Professional ratings
Review scores
| Source | Rating |
|---|---|
| AllMusic | 4/5 stars |
| Cross Rhythms | 9/10 stars |

In a review for AllMusic, Thom Jurek called the album "a glorious return for Staples... capable of inspiring those who are lucky enough to encounter it," and noted that "one can feel the presence and influence of Pops on these sides."

A writer for Cross Rhythms described the album as "Timeless music from a true musical giant," and commented: "Mavis' core audience, and a good cross-section of gospel music lovers, should enjoy this."

Margaret Moser of The Austin Chronicle called the music "a traditional Staple offering of sacred tunes and contemporary message music, blended in a timeless groove rising from the Mississippi Delta into the heavens above."

Writing for the Chicago Tribune, Greg Kot described the recording as "one of the finest albums in Mavis Staples' career... a blues-tinged gospel album about making the most of troubled times, a message that Staples has been delivering her entire life."

A reviewer for Billboard wrote: "Staples' performance is a constant delight. Have a Little Faith is a glorious album of tremendous emotional depth, a work that reaffirms Staples' place among the finest singers in modern American music."

The Chicago Reader's David Whiteis praised the track titled "God Is Not Sleeping," on which "her choked delivery approaches the wracked spiritual fervor that made her 50s Vee-Jay performances some of the most apocalyptic in the gospel canon."

== Track listing ==
| No. | Title | Writer(s) | Length |
|---|---|---|---|
| 1. | "Step Into the Light" | Mavis Staples; David Resnik; Jim Tullio; Robert Edward Rosa | 4:46 |
| 2. | "Pops Recipe" | Staples; Tullio; LeRoy P. Marinell | 5:26 |
| 3. | "Have a Little Faith" | Tullio; Jim Weider | 4:35 |
| 4. | "God Is Not Sleeping" | Barrington Levy; Phil Roy | 5:49 |
| 5. | "A Dying Man's Plea" | Traditional; additional lyrics by Pops Staples | 3:49 |
| 6. | "Ain't No Better Than You" | Billy Valentine; Bob Thiele Jr.; Roy | 4:13 |
| 7. | "I Wanna Thank You" | Brenda Burns | 4:49 |
| 8. | "I Still Believe in You" | Billy Osborne; Brenda Lee Eager | 3:31 |
| 9. | "At the End of the Day" | Tullio; Marinell | 3:56 |
| 10. | "There's a Devil on the Loose" | Burns | 3:34 |
| 11. | "In Times Like These" | Tullio; Marinell | 3:50 |
| 12. | "Will the Circle Be Unbroken?" | Ada R. Habershon; Charles H. Gabriel; arranged by Pops Staples | 3:21 |
| Total length: | | | 52:08 |

== Personnel ==
- Mavis Staples – vocals
- Jim Tullio – acoustic, electric and bass guitars, drums, percussion, backing vocals
- Chris "Hambone" Cameron – organs, clavinet, baritone saxophone, horn samples
- Jim Weider – electric guitar, acoustic slide guitar
- Shawn Christopher – backing vocals
- Yvonne Gage – backing vocals
- Arno Lucas – backing vocals
- Rene Monahan – backing vocals
- Stevie Robinson – backing vocals
- Michael Scott – backing vocals

=== Additional musicians ===
- John Martyn – Mutron guitar (track 1)
- David Resnick – acoustic slide guitar (track 1), electric guitar (track 7)
- John Scully – synthesizer (track 2), strings (track 9)
- Bob Lizik – bass guitar (track 2)
- Hank Guaglianone – drums (tracks 2, 6 and 11)
- Greg Marsh – percussion (track 2)
- Erik Scott – bass guitar (track 3)
- Larry Beers – drums (track 3)
- John Giblin – bass and electric guitar (track 4)
- David Onderdonk – acoustic guitar (track 4)
- Mark Walker – percussion (track 4)
- John Rice – electric guitar, dobro, bouzouki, fiddle (track 5)
- Foley McCreary – bass guitar (track 6)
- Pops Staples – electric guitar (track 7 and 10)
- Maurice Houston – bass guitar (tracks 7 and 10)
- Richard Gibbs – organ (track 7), synthesizer (track 10)
- Tim Austin – drums (tracks 7, 8 and 10)
- Will Crosby – guitar (track 8)
- Jack Chatman – bass guitar (track 8)
- Bill Ruppert – electric guitar (tracks 9 and 11)
- Matt Walker – drums (track 9)
- Mark Skyer – electric guitar (track 10)
- Alan Berliant – bass guitar (track 11)
- Lew London – acoustic slide guitar (track 12)
- Paul Mertens – bass harmonica (track 12)
- The Dixie Hummingbirds – backing vocals (track 1)
- Chicago Music Community Choir – backing vocals (track 11)

=== Technical personnel ===
- Jim Tullio and Mavis Staples – producers
- Mavis Staples – executive producer
- Doug McBride – additional engineer
- Maurice Houston – additional engineer
- Joshua Cutsinger – additional engineer
- John Giblin – additional engineer
- Chris Cameron – additional engineer
- Foley McCreary – additional engineer
- Chris Steinmetz – additional engineer
- Randy Friel – additional engineer
- Shelly Yakus – mixing and mastering
- Michael Newman – mixing and mastering
- Scott Steiner – mixing (track 11)
- Jim Tullio – mixing (track 11)
