= If All I Was Was Black =

Studio album by Mavis Staples
- Released: November 17, 2017
- Recorded: May 2017
- Studio: The Loft (Chicago)
- Genres: R&B; soul
- Length: 34:33
- Label: Anti-
- Producer: Jeff Tweedy

Mavis Staples chronology
Livin' on a High Note (2016)	If All I Was Was Black (2017)	Live in London (2019)

Singles from If All I Was Was Black
- 1. "If All I Was Was Black" Released: September 11, 2017; 2. "Little Bit" Released: October 12, 2017; 3. "Build a Bridge" Released: November 7, 2017; 4. "Ain't No Doubt About It" Released: November 14, 2017

If All I Was Was Black is the thirteenth studio album by American R&B, soul, and gospel singer Mavis Staples. It was released on November 17, 2017, by ANTI- Records. The album was written and produced by Jeff Tweedy.

== Background ==
The album's announced on September 11, 2017. The album consists of 11 songs, all of which were written by Jeff Tweedy. Staples said she hoped the album will "bring us all together as a people. That's what I hope to do. You can't stop me. You can't break me. I'm too loving. These songs are going to change the world." Tweedy described the message of the album, saying, "I’ve always thought of art as a political statement in and of itself—that it was enough to be on the side of creation and not destruction. But there is something that feels complicit at this moment in time about not facing what is happening in this country head on."

== Release and promotion ==
The lead single, "If All I Was Was Black", was released on September 11, 2017, along with the album's pre-order. "Little Bit" was released as the second single from the album on October 12, 2017. The third single, "Build a Bridge", was released on November 7, 2017. "Ain't No Doubt About It" was released as the fourth and final single on November 14, 2017. A music video for "If All I Was Was Black" was released on February 12, 2018.

== Critical reception ==
Professional ratings
Aggregate scores
Source	Rating
Metacritic	80/100
Review scores
Source	Rating
AllMusic	4/5 stars
The A.V. Club	B
Drowned in Sound	8/10
The Guardian	4/5 stars
The Observer	4/5 stars
Paste	8.4/10
Pitchfork	7.6/10
Q	4/5 stars
Rolling Stone	3.5/5 stars
Slant Magazine	3.5/5 stars

If All I Was Was Black received generally favorable reviews upon release. At Metacritic, which assigns a normalized rating out of 100 to reviews from mainstream publications, the album received an average score of 80, based on 18 reviews.

== Track listing ==
All tracks are written by Jeff Tweedy; "If All I Was Was Black", "No Time for Crying", and "We Go High" written with Mavis Staples.

If All I Was Was Black track listing
No.	Title	Length
1.	"Little Bit"	3:51
2.	"If All I Was Was Black"	3:56
3.	"Who Told You That"	2:48
4.	"Ain't No Doubt About It" (featuring Jeff Tweedy)	3:18
5.	"Peaceful Dream"	3:20
6.	"No Time for Crying"	4:37
7.	"Build a Bridge"	3:38
8.	"We Go High"	3:26
9.	"Try Harder"	3:51
10.	"All Over Again"	1:52
Total length:		34:33

== Personnel ==
Adapted from the album's liner notes.

- Mavis Staples – vocals
- Jeff Tweedy – guitar, bass, percussion, vocals, production
- Spencer Tweedy – drums, percussion, cover art
- Rick Holmstrom – guitar
- Jeff Turmes – bass
- Stephen Hodges – drums, percussion
- Donny Gerrard – backing vocals
- Vicki Randle – backing vocals
- Kelly Hogan – backing vocals
- Akenya Seymour – backing vocals
- Glenn Kotche – percussion
- Scott Ligon – Clavinet, piano, organ, Wurly, guitar
- Tom Schick – engineering, mixing
- Bob Ludwig – mastering
- Mark Greenberg – engineering assistance, cover art
- Zoran Orlic – cover photo

== Charts ==
Chart (2017)	Peak position
Belgian Albums (Ultratop Flanders)	106
New Zealand Heatseeker Albums (RMNZ)	10
