= Time Waits for No One (Mavis Staples album) =

Studio album by Mavis Staples
- Released: May 24, 1989
- Recorded: 1988–1989
- Studios: Paisley Park, Chanhassen, Minnesota, US; Ardent, Memphis, Tennessee, US; Sunset Sound, Hollywood, California, US
- Length: 39:11
- Label: Paisley Park
- Producers: Prince; Al Bell, Homer Banks, Lester Snell on "20th Century Express" & "The Old Songs"

Mavis Staples chronology
Oh What a Feeling (1979)	Time Waits for No One (1989)	The Voice (1993)

Professional ratings
Review scores
Source	Rating
AllMusic	3/5 stars

Time Waits for No One is the fourth solo studio album by American soul singer Mavis Staples. The album was her first on Prince's Paisley Park Records label and was released on May 24, 1989. The album includes six Prince-penned songs and two songs written by Homer Banks and Lester Snell. Shortly after this album, she continued her collaboration with Prince. In September 1989, she recorded the song "Melody Cool" which would appear in the 1990 movie Graffiti Bridge, as well as on its soundtrack, and on her 1993 follow-up album The Voice.

== Track listing ==
All tracks are written by Prince; except where noted.

No.	Title	Writer(s)	Length
1.	"Interesting"		4:28
2.	"20th Century Express"	Homer Banks, Lester Snell	3:54
3.	"Come Home"		5:29
4.	"Jaguar"		5:29
5.	"Train"		4:27
6.	"The Old Songs"	Banks, Snell	5:02
7.	"I Guess I'm Crazy"		4:10
8.	"Time Waits for No One"	Prince, Mavis Staples	6:12
Total length:			39:11

== Personnel ==
=== Musicians ===
- Mavis Staples – vocals
- Prince – all other instruments, drums, backing vocals
- Sheila E. – drums, percussion, co-lead vocals on "Time Waits for No One"
- Lester Snell – keyboards
- Eric Leeds – saxophone
- Atlanta Bliss – trumpet
- Miko Weaver – guitar on "Interesting"
- Boni Boyer, Dr. Fink – keyboards on "Interesting"
- Levi Seacer – bass on "Interesting"
- Ray Griffin – bass on "20th Century Express"
- Michael Toles – guitar on "The Old Songs"
- Lawrence Harper – drums on "The Old Songs"

=== Technical ===
- Joe Blaney, William C. Brown III, Susan Rogers, Coke Johnson, Eddie Garcia, Sal Greco – engineer
- Greg Gorman – photography
