= Mavis Staples (album) =

Studio album by Mavis Staples
- Released: June 16, 1969
- Genre: R&B, soul
- Length: 33:51
- Label: Volt
- Producer: Steve Cropper; Al Bell

Mavis Staples chronology
Mavis Staples (1969)	Only for the Lonely (1970)

Singles from Mavis Staples
- 1. "You're Driving Me (To the Arms of a Stranger)" Released: August 1969

Mavis Staples is the debut solo studio by American rhythm and blues and gospel singer Mavis Staples. It was released on June 16, 1969, by Volt Records.

== Critical reception ==
Professional ratings
Review scores
Source	Rating
AllMusic	3/5 stars

Cashbox published a review of the album in the issue dated June 28, 1969, which said, "Mavis Staples, of the famed Staple Singers gospel group, goes solo and soul in this Steve Cropper-produced set, and the album's appeal could easily spread to the underground/contemporary market. Mavis unleashes a trained, experienced and powerful voice on such items as "The Choking Kind," "A House Is Not a Home," "Son of a Preacher Man," "Chained," "Security" and "You Send Me."

== Track listing ==
Side one
No.	Title	Writer(s)	Length
1.	"Until I Met You"	Willie Hutch	2:48
2.	"Sweet Things You Do"	Alvertis Isbell; Booker T. Jones; Eddie Floyd	2:38
3.	"The Choking Kind"	Harlan Howard	3:24
4.	"You're Driving Me (To the Arms of a Stranger)"	Fred Briggs	3:23
5.	"A House Is Not a Home"	Burt Bacharach; Hal David	4:27

Side two
No.	Title	Writer(s)	Length
1.	"Security"	Otis Redding	2:47
2.	"Son of a Preacher Man"	John Hurley; Ronnie Wilkins	2:17
3.	"Pick Up the Pieces"	Don Davis; Briggs; Kent Barker	3:06
4.	"Chained"	Frank Wilson	2:50
5.	"Good to Me"	Julius Green; Redding	3:15
6.	"You Send Me"	L.C. Cook	2:56

== Personnel ==
Adapted from the album liner notes.

- Barry Beckett - keyboards
- Al Bell - producer
- Ron Capone - engineer
- Steve Cropper - producer, arranger, guitar
- James Alexander, Donald Dunn, David Hood - bass guitar
- Willie Hall, Roger Hawkins, Al Jackson Jr. - drums
- Isaac Hayes - organ
- Eddie Hinton - guitar
- Beverly Parker - cover design
- Bob Smith - cover photography
- Mavis Staples - lead vocals
- Marvell Thomas - piano
- Honeya Thompson - art direction
