= Oh What a Feeling (album) =

Studio album by Mavis Staples
- Released: July 16, 1979
- Studios: Muscle Shoals (Sheffield, Alabama); The Hit Factory (New York City, New York)
- Genres: Pop; R&B; soul
- Label: Warner Bros.
- Producers: Jerry Wexler; Barry Beckett

Mavis Staples chronology
A Piece of the Action (1977)	Oh What a Feeling (1979)	Time Waits for No One (1989)

Singles from Oh What a Feeling
- 1. "Tonight I Feel Like Dancing" Released: May 1979; 2. "Oh What a Feeling" Released: August 1979

Oh What a Feeling is a studio album by American R&B, soul and gospel singer Mavis Staples. It was released on July 16, 1979, by Warner Bros. Records.

== Critical reception ==
A review published by Billboard in the July 28, 1979, issue said, "Well known vocalist from the Staple Singers steps out on her second solo effort with a mixture of uptempo, disco flavored songs and midtempo, soulful ballads. Staples voice is fluid, strong and gutsy, giving this LP much the same appeal which highlighted Cheryl Lynn's exhilarating debut last year. Also contributing to this album's success is the instrumentation which is provided by the Muscle Shoals Horns, guitarists Mark Knopfler, Pele Can and others. Best cuts "Let Love Come Between Us", "Oh What a Feeling", "Loving You", "Tonight I Feel Like Dancing", and "I've Been to the Well Before"." The New York Times stated that Staples "remains a fine, fervent, huskily sensitive singer, and most of this disk does her justice."

Cashbox said, "Mavis gave the Staple Singers that distinct, gritty vocal sound, and on Oh What a Feeling she proves just how versatile she is. She soars through a mixed bag of styles on the LP - disco, gospel, straight ahead R&B and gospel - and performs them all in flawless fashion. A torchy ballad, "I Miss You", the disco hit, "Tonight I Feel Like Dancing", and the R&B flavored title cut are the LP's highpoints." The Bay State Banner opined that "it's a big comedown to realize veteran producers and idolized individuals like Jerry Wexler have so little idea of what makes successful singers tick, and have so little regard for them that they put them in embarrassing situations as this one."

== Track listing ==
Side one
No.	Title	Writer(s)	Length
1.	"Tonight I Feel Like Dancing"	Barry Beckett; George Jackson; Marc Giacomelli; Peter Alves	6:08
2.	"Let Love Come Between Us"	Joe Sobotka; John Wyker	3:26
3.	"Loving You"	Al Green; Fred Jordan; Reuben Fairfax, Jr.	4:08
4.	"I Don't Want to Lose My Real Good Thing"	Larry John McNally	3:16
5.	"I've Been to the Well Before"	Paul Kelly	3:57

Side two
No.	Title	Writer(s)	Length
1.	"Oh What a Feeling"	Jerry Weaver; Tom Jones III	3:03
2.	"If I Can't Have You"	Kelly	4:50
3.	"You're Made That Way"	Jeff Baxter; Keith Knudsen; Michael McDonald	3:57
4.	"I Miss You (Since You're Gone)"	Kelly	5:05
5.	"We Got Love"	Kelly	2:48

== Personnel ==
Adapted from the album liner notes.

- Harrison Calloway - horn arrangements
- Cynthia Douglas - background vocals
- Donna Davis - background vocals
- Pamela Vincent - background vocals
- David Hood - bass guitar
- Jesse Boyce - bass guitar
- Roger Hawkins - drums
- Gregg Hamm - engineer
- Joe Barbaria - engineer
- Bill Fair - assistant engineer
- Bruce Bachhalter - assistant engineer
- David Yates - assistant engineer
- Bobby Hata - mastering
- Stuart J. Romaine - mastering
- Steve Melton - remix engineer ("Tonight I Feel Like Dancing")
- Jimmy Johnson - guitar
- Larry Byrom - guitar
- Mark Knopfler - guitar
- Mose Dillard - guitar
- Pete Carr - guitar
- Muscle Shoals Horns - horns
- Barry Beckett - producer, keyboards, synthesizers
- Chris Koelle - make-up
- Tom Roady - percussion
- Sherman Weisburd - photography
- Jerry Wexler - producer
- Paul Wexler - supervisor
- Jerry Simpson - remix supervisor ("Tonight I Feel Like Dancing")
