= Livin' on a High Note =

Studio album by Mavis Staples
- Released: February 19, 2016
- Length: 38:36
- Label: Epitaph
- Producer: M. Ward

Mavis Staples chronology
One True Vine (2013)	Livin' on a High Note (2016)	If All I Was Was Black (2017)

Professional ratings
Aggregate scores
Source	Rating
Metacritic	76/100
Review scores
Source	Rating
AllMusic	3/5 stars
Consequence of Sound	B
The Guardian	3/5 stars
Pitchfork	7.4/10
PopMatters	8/10
Q	4/5 stars
Rolling Stone	4/5 stars
The Telegraph	4/5 stars
Uncut	8/10
Under the Radar	7.5/10

Livin' on a High Note is the tenth solo studio album by American musician Mavis Staples. It was released in February 2016 under Epitaph. Rolling Stone placed the album on its 45 Best Albums of 2016 So Far list.

== Track listing ==
No.	Title	Writer(s)	Length
1.	"Take Us Back"	Benjamin Booker	3:16
2.	"Love and Trust"	Ben Harper	3:19
3.	"If It's a Light"	Charity Rose Thielen	3:04
4.	"Action"	Merrill Garbus	3:06
5.	"High Note"	Valerie June	3:31
6.	"Don't Cry"	M. Ward	2:48
7.	"Tomorrow"	Jon Batiste, Aloe Blacc	3:20
8.	"Dedicated"	Justin Vernon, Ward	3:55
9.	"History, Now"	Neko Case, Donny Gerrard, Laura Veirs	2:07
10.	"One Love"	Aaron Livingston	3:10
11.	"Jesus Lay Down Beside Me"	Nick Cave	4:05
12.	"MLK Song"	Martin Luther King Jr., Ward	2:55
