= A Piece of the Action (soundtrack) =

Soundtrack album by Mavis Staples
- Released: October 10, 1977
- Studios: Curtom Studios (Chicago, Illinois)
- Genres: Funk, soul
- Length: 30:16
- Label: Curtom
- Producer: Curtis Mayfield

Mavis Staples chronology
Only for the Lonely (1970)	A Piece of the Action (1977)	Oh What a Feeling (1979)

Curtis Mayfield chronology
Give, Get, Take and Have (1976)	A Piece of the Action (1977)	Short Eyes (1977)

Singles from A Piece of the Action
- 1. "A Piece of the Action" Released: November 1977

Professional ratings
Review scores
Source	Rating
AllMusic	3/5 stars

A Piece of the Action is a soundtrack album by American rhythm and blues and gospel singer Mavis Staples, from the 1977 film of the same name. It was released on October 10, 1977, by Curtom Records.

== Critical reception ==
In the October 22, 1977 issue, Billboard reviewed the album: "Staples soulfully interprets the musical score, written and produced by Curtis Mayfield, of the flick starring Sidney Poitier, Bill Cosby and James Earl Jones. Staples and Mayfield collaborated previously on "Let's Do It Again", although then supported by her singing sisters. Mayfield's funky rhythms and evocative lyrics are among the composer's better recent efforts. While Staples' throaty vocals remain passionate, Mayfield's backup session men supply the funk. Best cuts: "Chocolate City", "A Piece of the Action", "'Til Blossoms Bloom" and "Koochie, Koochie, Koochie".

== Track listing ==
Side one
No.	Title	Writer(s)	Length
1.	"Chocolate City"	Curtis Mayfield; Rich Tufo; Keni Burke; Quinton Joseph; Henry Gibson; Gary Thompson	5:13
2.	"Of Whom Shall I Be Afraid"	Mayfield	3:10
3.	"Orientation"	Mayfield	3:08
4.	"A Piece of the Action"	Mayfield	4:22

Side two
No.	Title	Writer(s)	Length
1.	"Good Lovin' Daddy"	Mayfield	3:04
2.	"'Til Blossoms Bloom"	Mayfield; Gil Askey	3:08
3.	"Koochie, Koochie, Koochie"	Mayfield	2:47
4.	"Getting Deeper" (Instrumental)	Mayfield	5:24

== Personnel ==
Adapted from the album liner notes.

- Roger Anfinsen - engineer
- Gil Askey - strings and horn arrangements
- Fred Breitberg - engineer
- Sol Bobrov - string and horn contractor
- Mattie Butler - background vocals
- Tony D'Orio - cover portrait
- Marc Hauser - cover portrait
- Denese Heard - background vocals
- Henry Hicks Jr. - background vocals
- Ricki Linton - background vocals
- Curtis Mayfield - producer, rhythm arrangements
- Rich Tufo - keyboards, strings and horn arrangements
- Jim Schubert - art direction and design
- Alfonso Surrett - background vocals
- Keni Burke - bass
- Joseph "Lucky" Scott - bass
- Donelle Hagan - drums
- Quinton Joseph - drums
- Henry Gibson - congas, percussion
- Floyd Morris - keyboards, synthesizers
- Curtis Mayfield, Gary Thompson - guitars
