= We'll Never Turn Back =

Studio album by Mavis Staples
- Released: April 24, 2007
- Recorded: August 2006–2007
- Studios: Sound City, Van Nuys, California
- Genres: Gospel, soul, blues
- Length: 57:48
- Label: Anti-
- Producer: Ry Cooder

Mavis Staples chronology
Have a Little Faith (2004)	We'll Never Turn Back (2007)	Live: Hope at the Hideout (2008)

We'll Never Turn Back is the seventh studio album by American gospel and soul singer Mavis Staples, released April 24, 2007, on Anti-. Recorded in 2007 and produced by roots rock and blues musician Ry Cooder, it is a concept album with lyrical themes relating to the Civil Rights Movement of the 1950s and 1960s. Upon its release, We'll Never Turn Back received positive reviews from most music critics. It was also named one of the best albums of 2007 by several music writers and publications.

The cover photo shows two young black women at a civil rights demonstration in the South, early 1960s.

== Reception ==
=== Critical response ===
Professional ratings
Aggregate scores
Source	Rating
Metacritic	76/100
Review scores
Source	Rating
AllMusic	3.5/5 stars
Chicago Sun-Times	3.5/4 stars
Entertainment Weekly	B+
The Guardian	4/5 stars
The Independent	5/5 stars
Mojo	4/5 stars
MSN Music (Consumer Guide)	A−
Now	5/5 stars
PopMatters	7/10
USA Today	3.5/4 stars

We'll Never Turn Back received positive reviews from most music critics. At Metacritic, which assigns a normalized rating out of 100 to reviews from mainstream critics, the album received an average score of 76, based on 14 reviews, which indicates "generally favorable reviews". AllMusic writer Thom Jurek commended Staples for her vocal ability and performance, while calling it "the kind of album we need at the moment, one that doesn't flinch from the tradition but doesn't present it as a museum piece either". The Boston Globe's Renée Graham praised Staples's singing and additional songwriting on the album, stating "Mavis Staples doesn't so much sing a song as baptize it in truth". Caroline Sullivan of The Guardian praised her performance, stating "Staples is magnificent… Her voice is in tatters by the closing 'Jesus Is On the Mainline', and the memory lingers long after those ragged final notes". Entertainment Weekly's Will Hermes gave We'll Never Turn Back a B+ rating and described Staples's voice as "rich, weathered, and full of fire". Evening Standard writer Pete Clark gave it four out of four stars and praised Ry Cooder's production.

Jon Pareles of The New York Times called the album "bluesy, unvarnished, gutsy and knowing", and he described its music as "righteous, not self-righteous, and never far from roots in the Mississippi mud". However, PopMatters writer Lester Feder expressed that its "musical sophistication" can overshadow Staples's lyrics, stating "the album’s sound is so easy on the ears that it is extremely tempting to let it drown out the challenging sentiments of her words". In his consumer guide for MSN Music, music critic Robert Christgau gave We'll Never Turn Back an A− rating, indicating "the kind of garden-variety good record that is the great luxury of musical micromarketing and overproduction. Anyone open to its aesthetic will enjoy more than half its tracks". Christgau praised Staples's performance and wrote "she doesn't merely revive rousing old songs--she brings their moral passion into the present". Both USA Today and the Chicago Sun-Times gave it ratings of three-and-a-half out of four stars. Jim DeRogatis of the latter publication wrote that Staples "infuses the material with a passion and urgency undiminished by the passing of time", and he discussed the relevance of the album's themes to current events, stating:

In many corners, from grammar school social studies classes to the studio occupied until only recently by Don Imus, the Civil Rights movement of the early '60s is ancient history. But as the federal response to Hurricane Katrina sadly illustrated, institutionalized racism has hardly disappeared. Rather than an exercise in nostalgia, the eighth solo album of Mavis Staples' long and storied career is therefore as vital and relevant as today's headlines.

— Jim DeRogatis

The Washington Post's Bill Friskics-Warren shared a similar sentiment in his review, writing "Staples reinvests… with the moral authority to speak to social and economic injustices that persist today" and "rarely have 'remakes' sounded so tonic or inspired". The album received an A rating from the Boston Herald, which wrote "In the course of celebrating a landmark, Staples and Cooder make one of their own". We'll Never Turn Back also received perfect ratings from The Independent and NOW magazine. LA Weekly's Ernest Hardy gave it a rave review and lauded the album's sound, writing "Powerfully raw, suggestive blues is the foundation of the CD, but that root allows the collaborators to sprawl through other genres, reminding you of the connections between them all — blues and gospel, spirituals and jazz".

=== Accolades ===
We'll Never Turn Back was named one of the best albums of 2007 by several music writers and publications, including PopMatters (number 11) and The Austin Chronicle (number five). The album was ranked number 48 on Rolling Stone magazine's list of the Top 50 Albums of 2007. Los Angeles Times columnist Todd Martens named We'll Never Turn Back the second best album of the year, and Greg Kot of the Chicago Tribune ranked it number one on his list of the best albums of 2007.

== Track listing ==
- All songs were produced by Ry Cooder.

No.	Title	Writer(s)	Length
1.	"Down in Mississippi"	J. B. Lenoir	4:57
2.	"Eyes on the Prize"	Traditional	4:06
3.	"We Shall Not Be Moved"	Traditional	4:31
4.	"In the Mississippi River"	M. Jones	4:26
5.	"On My Way"	Traditional	4:10
6.	"This Little Light of Mine"	Ry Cooder, Traditional	3:22
7.	"99 and 1/2"	Ry Cooder, Mavis Staples, Traditional	4:46
8.	"My Own Eyes"	D. Bartlett, Ry Cooder, Mavis Staples	7:18
9.	"Turn Me Around"	Traditional	3:52
10.	"We'll Never Turn Back"	Bertha Gober	4:06
11.	"I'll Be Rested"	Ry Cooder, Joachim Cooder, Mavis Staples	5:44
12.	"Jesus Is on the Main Line"	Mavis Staples, Traditional	6:31

== Personnel ==
Credits for We'll Never Turn Back adapted from liner notes.

- Aisha Ayers – production assistant
- David Bartlett – photography
- Joachim Cooder – percussion, arranger, producer
- Ry Cooder – guitar, mandolin, arranger, producer
- Mike Elizondo – bass, piano
- Bettie Mae Fikes – background vocals
- Bernie Grundman – mastering
- Rutha Mae Harris – background vocals
- Andy Kaulkin – executive producer
- Jim Keltner – drums
- Ladysmith Black Mambazo – background vocals
- Rep. John Lewis – liner notes
- Pete Martinez – assistant
- Charles Neblett – background vocals
- Martin Pradler – engineer, mixing
- Joshua Douglas Smith – assistant
- Mavis Staples – arranger, vocals, author
- Chris Strong – portraits
- Susan Titelman – session photographer

== Chart history ==
Chart	Provider(s)	Peak position
Billboard 200 (U.S.)	Billboard	180
Billboard Independent Albums (U.S.)	Billboard	20
Billboard Top R&B/Hip-Hop Albums (U.S.)	Billboard	99

== See also ==
- Civil rights movement in popular culture
