= Human Mind =

Single by Mavis Staples

from the album Sad and Beautiful World
- Released: November 3, 2025
- Genre: Blues
- Length: 3:12
- Label: ANTI-
- Songwriters: Hozier; Allison Russell
- Producer: Brad Cook

Mavis Staples singles chronology
"Sad and Beautiful World" (2025)	"Human Mind" (2025)

"Human Mind" is a song recorded by the American R&B and gospel singer Mavis Staples, written by the Irish singer-songwriter Hozier and Canadian singer-songwriter Allison Russell, and produced by Brad Cook. The song was released on November 3, 2025, via ANTI-, as the fourth and final single for Staples' fourteenth solo studio album, Sad and Beautiful World.

== Release and promotion ==
"Human Mind" was first announced in August 2025, when it was revealed be featured as a track on Sad and Beautiful World. On November 4, 2026, the song was promoted with a performance by Staples on Stephen Colbert's The Late Show. It was released to radio on November 3, 2025. On November 7, 2025, it was released to digital download, streaming, CD, and LP formats as a member of the full album. It was published via Po Girl Music, Concord Music Publishing LLC, The Evolving Music Co. Ltd., and Sony Music Publishing.

== Development ==
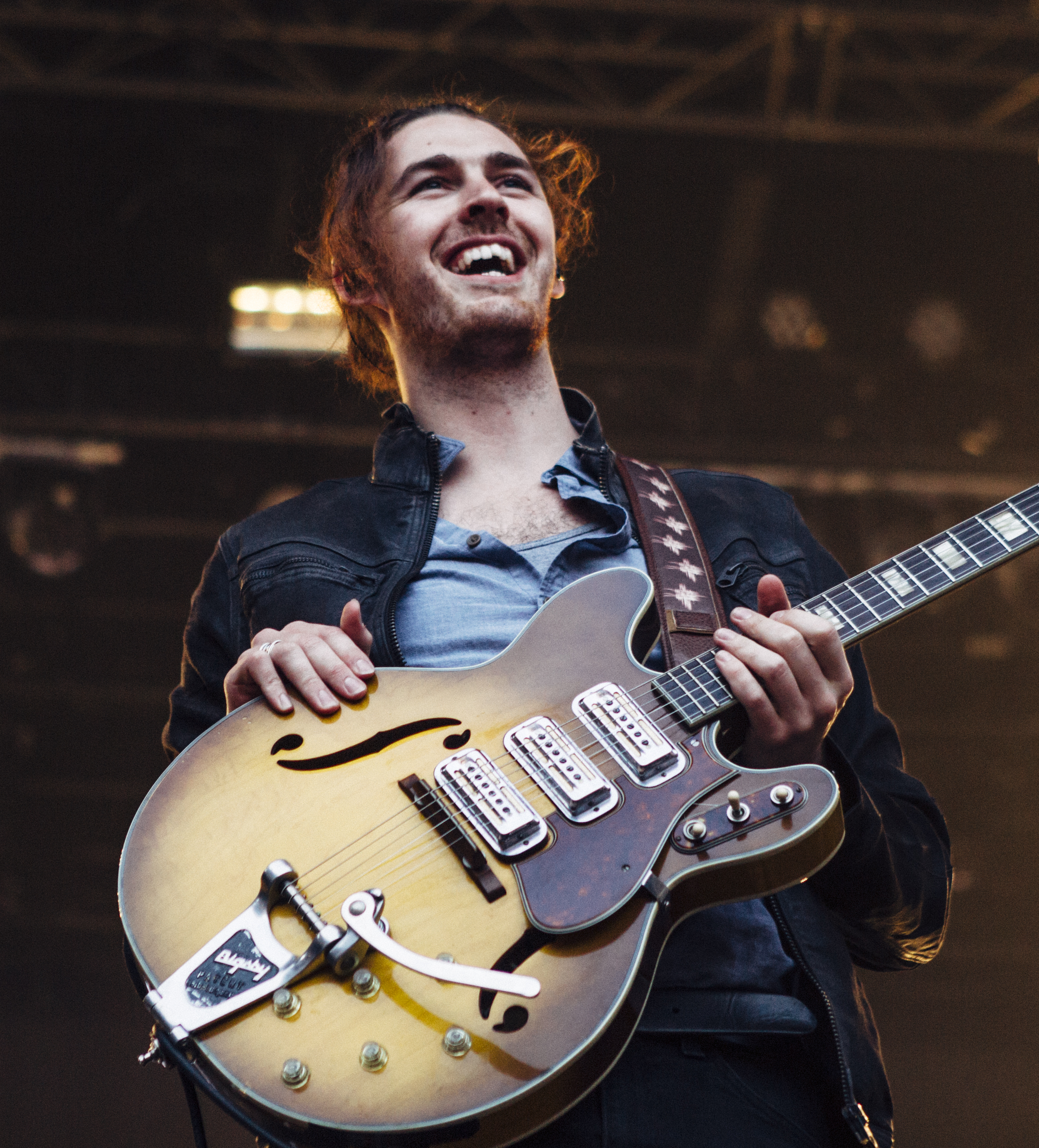
Hozier (pictured in 2015) co-wrote "Human Mind" alongside Allison Russell.

=== Lyrics and meaning ===
The first verse of "Human Mind" sees Staples' lament over "burning hillsides," "children dying by machines of war," and other references to family members of hers who have passed away. In the chorus, however, she, she goes on to "cautiously celebrate humanity," in attempt to "[express] a measure of hope for our near-broken world." The second verse in the song begins with "I am the last, Daddy, last of us," a reference to Staples being the only surviving member of the Staples Singers. "Daddy" in this context has been interpreted to mean either Staples' biological father or the God in Christianity. Staples explained that she had cried the first time she heard this particular lyric. The song has been compared to "Nina Cried Power", a previous collaboration between Staples and Hozier, as they both "[reckon] with the psychological toll of speaking out about injustice and cruelty, but [evolve] into a vow to keep fighting." Summatively, the song is themed around overcoming adversity, and "acknowledging the complexities, contradictions, violence and heartbreak of our world, while still finding hope and goodness in people."

=== Composition ===
"Human Mind" has been described as a "pensive" and "bluesy" composition that synthesizes elements of folk, gospel, and Southern soul within a restrained, contemplative arrangement. The track incorporates warm brass textures alongside the characteristic Southern soul timbres of piano and organ, contributing to what reviewers identified as an "overtly gospel feel." Additional commentary noted the presence of "smooth rhythms" and subtle folk inflections, which temper the song's blues‑gospel foundation. The song is composed in the key of F at 79 beats per minute and set in 4/4, employing descending gospel‑soul progressions that lend the verses a reflective, somber quality before resolving into a more open and hopeful chorus. Staples' vocal performance is delivered with measured clarity and emotional restraint, allowing the lyrical themes of perseverance and cautious optimism to remain central. The arrangement, featuring acoustic and electric guitars, Wurlitzer piano, organ, drum machine textures, and saxophone which critics identified as significant in the track's expression.

"Human Mind"
"Human Mind" demonstrates an acclaimed "rich and warm" production style.

=== Recording and production ===
"Human Mind" was the first track from Sad and Beautiful World to be recorded. The song was produced by Cook, who oversaw the project's overall direction and also produced the album's remaining nine tracks. Cook's role extended beyond production to include contributions on acoustic guitar, bass, and drum machine programming. Cook, Brian Hernandez, and Phil Cook served as the primary recording engineers, while vocal tracking was handled by Jonathan Lackey and Mat Lejeune. The song was subsequently mixed by Cook in collaboration with Paul Voran. Final mastering was completed by Tim Smiley.

== Reception ==
=== Critical ===
Rolling Stone's Jonathan Bernstein praised "Human Mind" as it "lays out her philosophy most plainly," going on to say, "of all the songs written for Mavis in recent years, none speak to her radiant work better." Bernstein described Staples' beliefs as "battered but beautiful," with lyrics describing that, "even when [Mavis'] own hope in humanity has been cracked, she can find a way to let the light get in." Andrew Gulden of Americana Highway praised the song's "gumption and guarded optimism" Highway Queens described the song as a "brilliant job," observing that the song "tells us the state of the world and gives us all hope in the line 'you’ll find good in it sometimes.'" James Pollard of AP News labelled the song among the best of its album.

=== Commercial ===
"Human Mind" impacted adult alternative-formatted radio stations in the United States, after being released to radio on November 3, 2025. The song debuted at number 37 on Billboard's Adult Alternative Airplay chart for the chart week dated to November 29, 2025. In the chart week dated to January 31, 2026, the song rose 21–20 to reach its peak on the chart. It remained on the chart for eleven weeks. On the Gospel Digital Song Sales chart, the song peaked at number 10, and remained on the chart for one week.

=== Accolades ===
Year	Organization	Category	Result	Ref.
2027	Grammy Awards	Best American Roots Performance	Pending	

== Personnel ==
Credits adapted from Tidal Music.

- Allison Russell – writer
- Andrew Hozier-Byrne – writer
- Anjimile – background vocals
- Brad Cook – producer, acoustic guitar, bass, drum machine, mixer, recording engineer
- Brian Hernandez – recording engineer
- Jonathan Lackey – vocal recording engineer
- Mat Lejeune – vocal recording engineer
- Matt Douglas – saxophone
- Matt McCaughan – drum kit, drum machine
- Mavis Staples – lead vocals
- Paul Voran – mixer
- Phil Cook – acoustic guitar, electric guitar, organ, piano (Wurlitzer), recording engineer
- Tim Smiley – masterer

== Charts ==
Chart performance for "Human Mind"
Chart (2025–2026)	Peak position
US Adult Alternative Airplay (Billboard)	20
US Gospel Digital Song Sales (Billboard)	10

== Release history ==
Release history and formats for "Human Mind"
Region	Date	Format(s)	Label(s)	Ref.
United States	November 3, 2025	Adult alternative radio	ANTI-	
Various	November 7, 2025	Digital download; streaming; CD; LP; (with Sad and Beautiful World)	ANTI-	
