= One True Vine =

Studio album by Mavis Staples
- Released: June 25, 2013
- Recorded: 2012
- Genres: Gospel, soul, blues
- Label: Anti-
- Producer: Jeff Tweedy

Mavis Staples chronology
You Are Not Alone (2010)	One True Vine (2013)	Livin' on a High Note (2016)

Professional ratings
Aggregate scores
Source	Rating
Metacritic	81/100
Review scores
Source	Rating
AllMusic	4/5 stars
The A.V. Club	A−
Consequence of Sound	4/5 stars
Entertainment Weekly	A−
The Independent	4/5 stars
Mojo	4/5 stars
The Observer	4/5 stars
Paste	8.6/10
Pitchfork	7.4/10
The Telegraph	5/5 stars

One True Vine is the ninth solo studio album by Mavis Staples. It was released in June 2013 by Anti-. It is her 13th studio album, and the second on which she collaborated with record producer and Wilco frontman Jeff Tweedy. Tweedy also played most of the instruments on the album, with the exception of the drums, which were played by his son, Spencer Tweedy. The album was recorded at the Wilco Loft in Chicago, and while working on it, Staples commuted back and forth between the Loft (on Chicago's North Side) and her home on Chicago's South Side. One True Vine debuted at No. 67 on the Billboard 200 chart dated for July 13, 2013, marking the highest-peaking entry for Staples on the chart so far.

== Track list ==
No.	Title	Writer(s)	Length
1.	"Holy Ghost"	Alan Sparhawk	2:42
2.	"Every Step"	Jeff Tweedy	4:02
3.	"Can You Get to That"	George Clinton, Ernie Harris	2:57
4.	"Jesus Wept"	Tweedy	4:47
5.	"Far Celestial Shore"	Nick Lowe	2:55
6.	"What Are They Doing In Heaven Today?"	Washington Phillips	4:03
7.	"Sow Good Seeds"	Public Domain	2:50
8.	"I Like the Things About Me"	Roebuck Staples, Martha Stubbs	3:57
9.	"Woke Up This Morning (With My Mind on Jesus)"	Public Domain	2:56
10.	"One True Vine"	Tweedy	3:42

== Personnel ==
- Mavis Staples - lead vocals
- Jeff Tweedy - guitars; bass; horn arrangements on tracks 4 and 6; background vocals on track 3; percussion on tracks 8 and 9; Wurlitzer electric piano and piano on track 4; OP1 synthesizer on track 5; marxophone, Mellotron and organ on track 6; slide guitar on track 7
- Spencer Tweedy - drums on tracks 2–10; percussion on tracks 2, 5, 7, 8 and 9
- Mark Greenberg - Wurlitzer electric piano on track 1
- Scott Ligon - piano on track 10
- Rick Holmstrom - electric guitar on track 7
- Paul Von Mertens - clarinet on tracks 4 and 6; baritone saxophone and horn arrangements on track 6
- Andrew Baker - bass trumpet on tracks 4 and 6; euphonium on track 6
- Donny Gerrard - background vocals on tracks 1–9; percussion on tracks 4 and 8
- Kelly Hogan - background vocals on tracks 1–9
- Tiffany "Makeda" Francisco - background vocals on tracks 1–9
- Liam Cunningham - background vocals on track 8

== Charts ==
Chart (2014)	Peak position
UK Christian & Gospel Albums (OCC)	1
UK R&B Albums (Official Charts)	14
US Billboard 200	67
US Top Gospel Albums (Billboard)	2
US Independent Albums (Billboard)	15
US Top R&B/Hip-Hop Albums (Billboard)	15
US Indie Store Album Sales (Billboard)	7
