= The Voice (Mavis Staples album) =

Studio album by Mavis Staples
- Released: August 24, 1993
- Recorded: 1990–1993
- Studio: Paisley Park, Chanhassen, Minnesota, US
- Genre: Soul
- Length: 53:41
- Label: Paisley Park
- Producer: Prince, Bernard Belle, Rick Brown, Ivan Hampden, Jr., Kirk Johnson, Emmanuel Rahiem LeBlanc, Danny Madden, Ricky Peterson, Statik, J.D. Steele, Michael Stokes, Tom Tucker, Gordon Williams

Mavis Staples chronology
| Time Waits for No One (1989) | The Voice (1993) | Spirituals & Gospel (1996) |

Singles from The Voice
- 1. "The Voice" Released: 1993; 2. "Blood Is Thicker Than Time" Released: 1993

Professional ratings
Review scores
| Source | Rating |
|---|---|
| AllMusic | 2/5 stars |
| Cross Rhythms | 4/5 stars |

The Voice is the fifth solo studio album by American soul singer Mavis Staples. This album was her second for Prince's Paisley Park Records label and was released on August 24, 1993. The song "Melody Cool" from the 1990 movie Graffiti Bridge appeared on this album as well as the movie soundtrack. The song "Positivity" is a cover of Prince's version from the 1988 album Lovesexy.

== Track listing ==
All tracks are written by Prince; except where noted.

| No. | Title | Writer(s) | Length |
|---|---|---|---|
| 1. | "The Voice" | Rosie Gaines, Prince | 4:13 |
| 2. | "House in Order" | | 4:44 |
| 3. | "Blood is Thicker than Time" | | 3:13 |
| 4. | "You Will Be Moved" | | 4:11 |
| 5. | "All Because of You" | Billy Beck, Rick Brown | 5:06 |
| 6. | "The Undertaker" | Michael B., Levi Seacer Jr., Prince, Sonny T. | 7:26 |
| 7. | "Melody Cool" | | 3:46 |
| 8. | "Kain't Turn Back" | Bernard Belle, Raymond Watkins | 4:03 |
| 9. | "I'll Be Right There" | Emmanuel Rahiem LeBlanc, Gordon Williams | 4:03 |
| 10. | "A Man Called Jesus" | | 3:55 |
| 11. | "Why" | Mike Ferguson, Ivan Hampden, Danny Madden, Paulette McWilliams | 4:27 |
| 12. | "Positivity" | | 4:34 |
| Total length: | | | 53:41 |
