= Carry Me Home (album) =

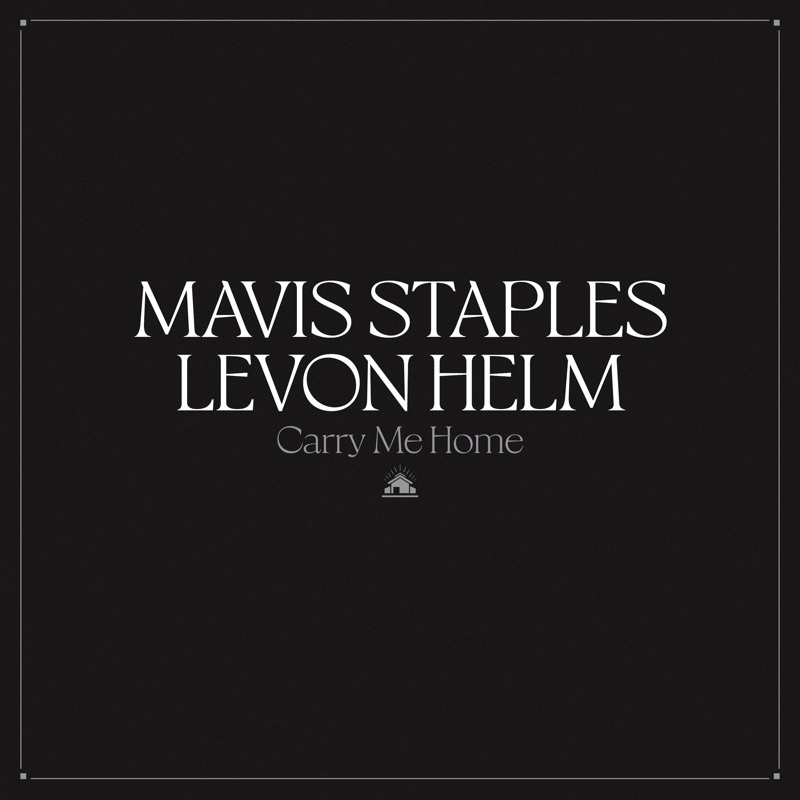

Live album by Levon Helm and Mavis Staples
- Released: May 20, 2022
- Recorded: June 3, 2011
- Venues: Levon Helm Studios, Woodstock, New York, United States
- Genres: Roots rock, rhythm and blues
- Length: 54:36
- Language: English
- Label: Anti-
- Producer: Larry Campbell

Levon Helm chronology
The Midnight Ramble Sessions, Volume Three (2014)	Carry Me Home (2022)

Mavis Staples chronology
We Get By (2019)	Carry Me Home (2022)	Sad and Beautiful World (2025)

Carry Me Home is a 2022 collaborative album between Americans roots rock drummer Levon Helm and soul singer Mavis Staples, released on Anti-. Made from sessions recorded at Helm's studio in 2011, shortly before his death, the album has received praise from critics.

== Critical reception ==
Professional ratings
Aggregate scores
Source	Rating
AnyDecentMusic?	7.5/10
Metacritic	83/100
Review scores
Source	Rating
AllMusic	4/5 stars
The Arts Desk	3/5 stars
American Songwriter	4/5 stars
The Guardian	4/5 stars
Mojo	4/5 stars
Record Collector	4/5 stars
Pitchfork	7.5/10
PopMatters	8/10
Uncut	8/10

According to the review aggregator Metacritic, Carry Me Home received "universal acclaim" based on a weighted average score of 83 out of 100 from eight critic scores. Editors at AnyDecentMusic? characterized critical consensus as a 7.5 out of 10, with eight reviews. The editors of AllMusic scored the album four out of five stars, with reviewer Mark Deming noting that "it's an excellent document of the simple, powerfully eloquent magic that happens when Mavis Staples steps before a vocal mike and lets her spirit elevate all around her". For Pitchfork, Grayson Haver Currin rated this release a 7.5 out of 10, summing it up as "a jubilant lesson in living history" with Helm's drumming, Staples' singing, and their dual backing bands noted as powerful ensembles, as well as the political and religious themes of the lyrics. In The Guardian, Alexis Petridis rated Carry Me Home four out of five stars, also pointing out Staples' "big, arresting, church-reared voice with a gritty undertow" that commands the performance. For American Songwriter, Lee Zimmerman rated the album a four out of five, writing that it "resonates in a meaningful and mighty way". For PopMatters, Steve Horowitz pointed out the recording's strong vocal performance by Staples and the varied accompaniment that allows her to take the lead on certain tracks; he rated it an eight out of 10.

== Track listing ==
1. "This Is My Country" (Curtis Mayfield) – 4:34
2. "Trouble in My Mind" (Richard M. Jones) – 5:04
3. "Farther Along" (W. B. Stevens) – 4:22
4. "Hand Writing on the Wall" (Dottie Peoples, Harvey Lee Watkins, Jr.) – 4:06
5. "I Wish I Knew How It Would Feel to Be Free" (Dick Dallas, Billy Taylor) – 3:42
6. "Move Along Train" (Roebuck "Pops" Staples) – 3:27
7. "This May Be the Last Time" (Roebuck "Pops" Staples) – 4:38
8. "When I Go Away" (Larry Campbell) – 5:16
9. "Wide River to Cross" (Buddy Miller, Julie Miller) – 5:08
10. "You Got to Move" (Mississippi Fred McDowell) – 2:41
11. "You Got to Serve Somebody" (Bob Dylan) – 5:36
12. "The Weight" (Robbie Robertson) – 5:56

== Personnel ==
Levon Helm Band

- Steven Bernstein – trumpet
- Larry Campbell – harmony vocals, guitar, mandolin, production
- Jay Collins – tenor saxophone
- Clark Gayton – trombone
- Amy Helm – harmony vocals
- Levon Helm – drums, vocals, executive production
- Erik Lawrence – baritone saxophone
- Brian Mitchell – piano, keyboards
- Byron Isaacs – bass guitar
- Teresa Williams – harmony vocals
- Jim Weider – guitar

Mavis Staples Band

- Donny Gerrard – harmony vocals
- Stephen Hodges – drums
- Rick Holmstrom – guitar
- Vicki Randle – harmony vocals
- Mavis Staples – vocals, executive production
- Yvonne Staples – harmony vocals
- Jeff Turmes – bass guitar

Technical personnel

- Mark Chalecki – audio mastering at Little Red Book Mastering
- Justin Guip – audio engineering
- Brendan McDonough – assistant engineering
- Landon Speers – photography
