= Rick Holmstrom =

American singer

- Born: May 30, 1965 (age 61); Fairbanks, Alaska, United States
- Genres: Electric blues, West Coast blues, rhythm and blues
- Occupations: Guitarist, singer, songwriter, record producer
- Instruments: Guitar, vocals
- Years active: 1985–present
- Labels: Black Top, Tone-Cool, M.C.
- Website: rickholmstrom.com

Rick Holmstrom (born May 30, 1965) is an American electric blues and rhythm and blues guitarist, singer and songwriter. Holmstrom has previously worked with William Clarke, Johnny Dyer, and Rod Piazza. He is currently the bandleader for Mavis Staples. In addition, Holmstrom has played and recorded with Jimmy Rogers, Billy Boy Arnold, Booker T. Jones, Jody Williams, and R. L. Burnside.

One critic observed of Holmstrom, "he delivers music with technical savvy and traditional stylings, without sacrificing originality and pure adventure".

== Early life ==
Rick Holmstrom was born in Fairbanks, Alaska, United States, one of three children and the only son of Larry and Diane Holmstrom. His paternal grandfather, Francis O. Holmstrom, was a native of Everett, Washington, who moved to Fairbanks during the early part of the middle 20th century, and owned a jewelry store in downtown Fairbanks for many years. Holmstrom grew up in Fairbanks, where his father worked as a broadcaster and broadcasting executive, and also headed the Fairbanks office of the Governor of Alaska under governor Jay Hammond.

== Music career ==
After relocating to Southern California, and while attending college in Redlands, California, Holmstrom joined a local blues group. Holmstrom also went to blues concerts, where he played guitar with Smokey Wilson and Junior Watson.

He joined William Clarke's backing band, and played both lead and rhythm guitar for three years up to 1988. That same year, Holmstrom suffered a significant tragedy in his family, as his father and one of his sisters were killed in a whitewater rafting accident in Alaska's Wrangell-St. Elias National Park. Later joining forces with Johnny Dyer, Holmstrom played on his albums, Listen Up (1994) and Shake It! (1995). He moved on to join Rod Piazza's backing group, the Mighty Flyers and, in 1996, released his first solo album, Lookout! on Black Top Records. It was an instrumental affair, about which one reviewer noted "Holmstrom's inventive ideas are top-notch, making each track stand mightily on its own".

However, Holmstrom continued to perform with Piazza, and help him record Tough and Tender (1997). By 2000, Holmstrom's second solo effort, Gonna Get Wild was released on Tone-Cool Records, and he stayed long enough with Piazza's backing ensemble to participate on Beyond the Source (2001). Holmstrom's next release, Hydraulic Groove (2002) is one of his most daring efforts, where he used loops and samples, and incorporated elements of acid jazz/nu-jazz, funk and trip hop to his blues, featuring guest performances by John Medeski and DJ Logic. Hydraulic Groove peaked at number 9 in the Billboard Top Blues Albums chart. In 2005, Holmstrom played at the Dark Season Blues festival. Holmstrom turned to record production duties for other musicians before, in 2006, releasing Live at the Cafe Boogaloo.

Holmstrom switched record labels to M.C. Records, and in 2007 issued Late in the Night.

== With Mavis Staples ==
Since 2007, Holmstrom, along with his trio (Jeff Turmes on bass, and Stephen Hodges on drums) from the Late in the Night recording, have frequently toured and recorded with Mavis Staples. They appear on her 2008 album, Live: Hope at the Hideout, her 2010 Grammy Award-winning album, You Are Not Alone, and her 2017 album, If All I Was Was Black.

Staples, in turn, appeared on Holmstrom's 2012 album, Cruel Sunrise.

== Discography ==
Year	Title	Record label
1996	Lookout!	Black Top
2000	Gonna Get Wild	Tone-Cool
2002	Hydraulic Groove	Tone-Cool
2006	Live at the Cafe Boogaloo	Tone-Cool
2007	Late in the Night	M.C. Records
2012	Cruel Sunrise	M.C. Records
2021	See That Light	LuEllie Records
2022	Get It!	LuEllie Records

== See also ==
- List of electric blues musicians
