= Donny Gerrard =

Canadian singer (1946–2022)

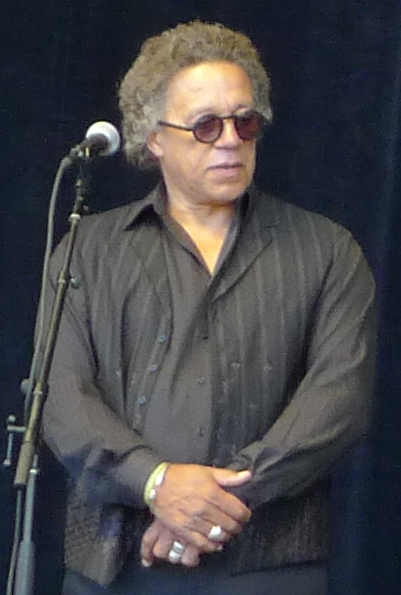
- Gerrard at Outside Lands 2011

Background information
- Born: Donald Bradford Gerrard; March 19, 1946; Vancouver, British Columbia, Canada
- Died: February 3, 2022 (aged 75) Santa Fe, New Mexico, U.S.
- Occupation: Singer
- Formerly of: Skylark

Donald Bradford Gerrard (March 19, 1946 – February 3, 2022) was a Canadian singer. He was a member of the band Skylark in the early 1970s, and in later years performed and recorded as a baritone backup singer for artists such as Mavis Staples.

== Early life ==
Gerrard was born in Vancouver, Canada, on March 19, 1946. He began singing as a child and his talents became noticed when he was in high school. He and Al Foreman formed a group called "Donny Gerrard and the Checkmates" after the latter heard him sing at church community event in 1961. The band performed for three years before breaking up. He subsequently had a sojourn in Hawaii with another band, before coming back to Canada and reuniting with Foreman in Night Train Revue as its bassist for the next two years. Gerrard later relocated to the United States and started out performing in flash Vegas lounge acts. He was also part of a group that disbanded after Floyd Sneed became a member of Three Dog Night.

== Career ==
Gerrard successfully auditioned as lead vocalist for Skylark in the early 1970s, with his performance leaving an impression on David Foster. He sang with the band on its self-titled album in 1972, and was lead singer on their hit single, "Wildflower". It ultimately lasted 21 weeks on the Billboard charts.

After Skylark disbanded in 1973, Gerrard commenced his solo career. He released his first single titled "(Baby) Don't Let It Mess Your Mind" in 1975 with The Rocket Record Company label. He issued another single, "Greedy for Your Love" in 1976, the same year he released a self-titled album with the Greedy label in Los Angeles. However, his solo career never took off with the success his record label desired. He released his last single "Stay a While With Me" in 1977, before becoming a backing vocalist.

In 1985, Gerrard appeared in a duet on the St. Elmo's Fire soundtrack along with Amy Holland. The ballad from David Foster, "Love Theme from St. Elmo's Fire (For Just a Moment)" was a slower version of the film's main theme song with added lyrics. He would also contribute vocals to Foster's charity single "Tears Are Not Enough," sung by a cavalcade of Canadian celebrities to raise money for the famine in Ethiopia.

Gerrard was a backup singer for musicians such as Elton John, Bruce Springsteen, and Cher. He sang backup for Mavis Staples on her album One True Vine, and at live performances, including at the Lincoln Center in 2014. He continued to perform with Staples, and can be heard on her 2016 album, Livin' on a High Note. His final known contribution was in her album We Get By, released in 2019.

== Personal life ==
Gerrard was married to Myra until his death. Together, they had one child (Cooper). He also had another child (Traie Payne) from a previous relationship before he was married.

While receiving hospice care at his home in Santa Fe, New Mexico, Gerrard died on February 3, 2022, at the age of 75. He suffered from cancer prior to his death.
