= Mavis Staples =

American R&B and gospel singer (born 1939)

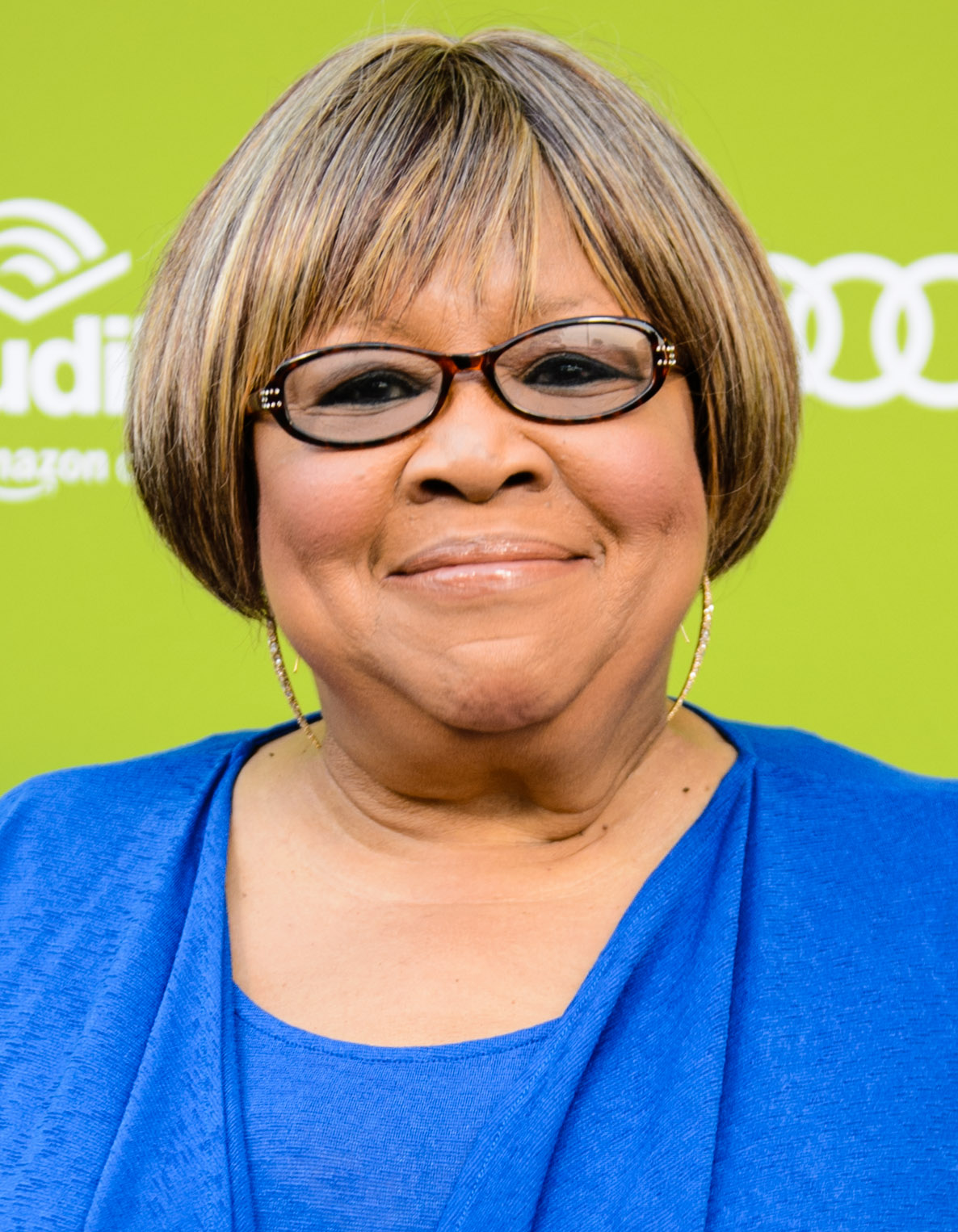
- Staples at the Montclair Film Festival in 2015

Background information
- Born: July 10, 1939 (age 87); Chicago, Illinois, U.S.
- Genres: R&B; soul; gospel; Americana
- Occupations: Singer; activist
- Years active: 1950–present
- Labels: Epic; Stax/Volt; Curtom; Alligator; Anti-; Paisley Park/Warner Bros.; Verve; ANTI-
- Spouse: Spencer Leak (m. 1964; div. 1972)
- Website: mavisstaples.com

Mavis Staples (born July 10, 1939) is an American rhythm and blues and gospel singer and civil rights activist. Named one of the "Greatest Singers of all Time" by Rolling Stone, she rose to fame as a member of her family's band the Staple Singers, of which she is the last surviving member. During her time in the group, she recorded the hit singles "I'll Take You There" and "Let's Do It Again". In 1969, Staples released her self-titled debut solo album.

Staples continued to release solo albums throughout the following decades and collaborated with peers such as Aretha Franklin, Prince, Arcade Fire, Nona Hendryx, Ry Cooder, David Byrne, and former romantic partner Bob Dylan. Her eighth studio album You Are Not Alone (2010), earned critical acclaim, and became her first album as a soloist to reach number one on a Billboard chart, peaking atop the Top Gospel Albums chart. It also earned Staples her first Grammy Award win. Following this, she released the albums One True Vine (2013), Livin' on a High Note (2016), If All I Was Was Black (2017), and We Get By (2019). Over the years, Staples collaborated with modern artists such as Hozier on the single "Nina Cried Power", and Jon Batiste on the We Are track "Mavis", which earned her a Grammy Award for Album of the Year, as a featured artist.

As member of the Staple Singers, Staples is the recipient of the Grammy Lifetime Achievement Award, as well as an inductee into the Rock and Roll Hall of Fame (1999) and the Gospel Music Hall of Fame (2018). As a solo artist, she has won five solo Grammy Awards, and was inducted into the Blues Hall of Fame as a soloist. In 2016, she was made a Kennedy Center Honoree. In 2019, the Rock and Roll Hall of Fame honored her with their inaugural Rock Hall Honors Award for her career.

== Biography ==
Mavis Staples was born in Chicago, Illinois, on July 10, 1939, to mother Oceola Staples and father Roebuck "Pops" Staples. She grew up with four siblings: Pervis (a brother), and Cleotha, Yvonne, and Cynthia (sisters).

Mavis attended elementary school with Lou Rawls and Sam Cooke. She began her singing career with her family's musical group, the Staple Singers, in 1950. Their first paid performance was at a Chicago church. Initially singing locally at churches and appearing on a weekly radio show, the Staples scored a hit in 1956 with "Uncloudy Day" for the Vee-Jay label.

When Mavis graduated from Parker High School (later named Paul Robeson High School) in 1957, the Staple Singers took their music on the road. Led by family patriarch Roebuck "Pops" Staples on guitar, and including the voices of Mavis and her siblings Cleotha, Yvonne, and Pervis, the Staples were called "God's Greatest Hitmakers".

With Mavis' voice and Pops' songs, singing, and guitar playing, the Staples evolved from popular gospel singers (with recordings on United Records and Riverside Records, as well as Vee-Jay) to become the most influential spirituality-based group in America. By the mid-1960s the Staple Singers, inspired by Pops' close friendship with Martin Luther King Jr., became the spiritual and musical voices of the civil rights movement. They covered contemporary hits that conveyed positive messages, including Bob Dylan's "A Hard Rain's a-Gonna Fall" and a version of Stephen Stills' "For What It's Worth".

During a December 20, 2008, appearance on National Public Radio's news show Wait Wait... Don't Tell Me!, when Staples was asked about her past personal relationship with Dylan, she admitted that they "were good friends, yes indeed" and that he had asked her father for her hand in marriage.

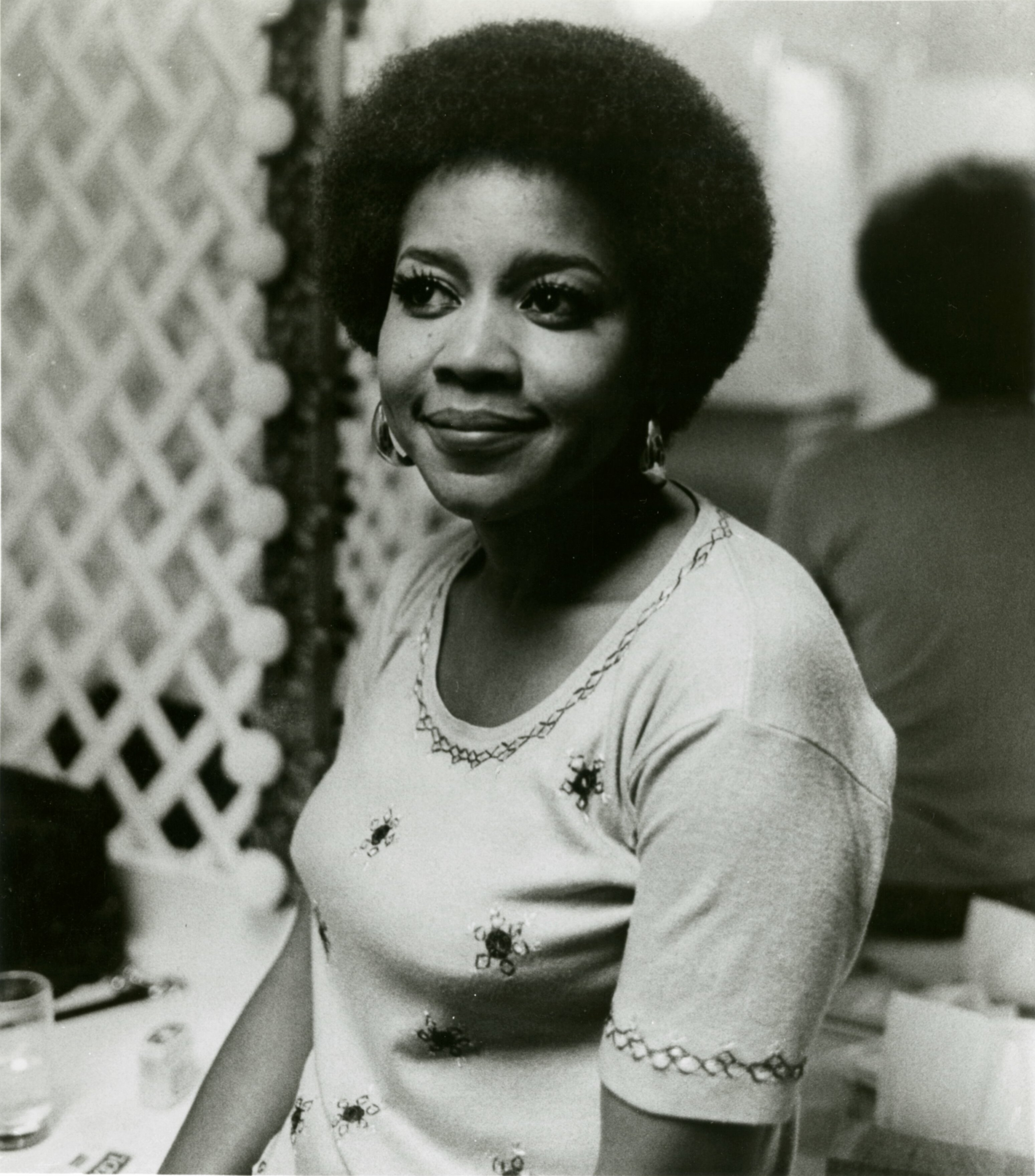
Staples in 1971, while signed to Stax Records

The Staples sang "message" songs like "Long Walk to D.C." and "When Will We Be Paid?," bringing their moving and articulate music to a huge number of young people. The group signed to Stax Records in 1968, joining their gospel harmonies and deep faith with musical accompaniment from members of Booker T. and the MGs. The Staple Singers hit the top 40 eight times between 1971 and 1975, including two No. 1 singles, "I'll Take You There" (produced by Al Bell and recorded and mixed by Terry Manning) and "Let's Do It Again", and the No. 2 single "Who Took the Merry Out of Christmas?".

Mavis made her first solo foray while at Epic Records with the Staple Singers, releasing a lone single "Crying in the Chapel" to little fanfare in the late 1960s. The single was finally re-released on the 1994 Sony Music collection Lost Soul. Her first solo album would not come until a 1969 self-titled release for the Stax label. After another Stax release, Only for the Lonely, in 1970, she released a soundtrack album, A Piece of the Action, on Curtis Mayfield's Curtom label. A 1984 album (also self-titled) preceded two albums under the direction of rock star Prince; 1989's Time Waits for No One, followed by 1993's The Voice, which People magazine named one of the Top Ten Albums of 1993. Her 1996 release, Spirituals & Gospels: A Tribute to Mahalia Jackson, was recorded with keyboardist Lucky Peterson. The recording honors Mahalia Jackson, a close family friend and a significant influence on Mavis Staples's life.

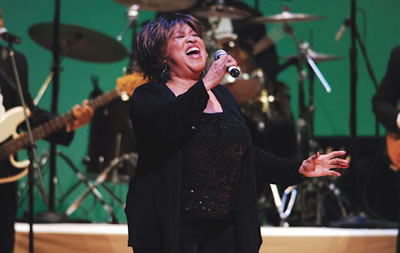
Staples singing during the 2006 NEA National Heritage Fellows concert.

Staples made a major national return with the release of the album Have a Little Faith on Chicago's Alligator Records, produced by Jim Tullio, in 2004. The album featured spiritual music, some of it semi-acoustic.

In 2004, Staples contributed to a Verve release by legendary jazz-rock guitarist, John Scofield. The album, entitled That's What I Say, was a tribute to the great Ray Charles and led to a live tour featuring Staples, John Scofield, pianist Gary Versace, drummer Steve Hass, and bassist Rueben Rodriguez. A new album for Anti- Records entitled We'll Never Turn Back was released on April 24, 2007. The Ry Cooder-produced concept album focuses on gospel songs of the civil rights movement and also included two new original songs by Cooder.

Her voice has been sampled by some of the biggest selling artists, including Salt 'N' Pepa, Ice Cube, Ludacris, and Hozier. Staples has recorded with a wide variety of musicians, from her friend, Bob Dylan (with whom she was nominated for a 2004 Grammy Award in the "Best Pop Collaboration With Vocals" category for their duet on "Gonna Change My Way of Thinking", from the album Gotta Serve Somebody: The Gospel Songs of Bob Dylan) to The Band, Ray Charles, Prince, Nona Hendryx, George Jones, Natalie Merchant, Ann Peebles, and Delbert McClinton. She has provided vocals on current albums by Los Lobos and Dr. John, and she appears on tribute albums to such artists as Johnny Paycheck, Stephen Foster and Bob Dylan.

In 2003, Staples performed in Memphis at the Orpheum Theater alongside a cadre of her fellow former Stax Records stars during "Soul Comes Home," a concert held in conjunction with the grand opening of the Stax Museum of American Soul Music at the original site of Stax Records, and appears on the CD and DVD that were recorded and filmed during the event. In 2004, she returned as guest artist for the Stax Music Academy's SNAP! Summer Music Camp and performed again at the Orpheum with 225 of the academy's students. In June 2007, she again returned to the venue to perform at the Stax 50th Anniversary Concert to Benefit the Stax Museum of American Soul Music, produced by Concord Records, who now owns and has revived the Stax Records label.

Staples was a judge for the 3rd and 7th annual Independent Music Awards to support independent artists.

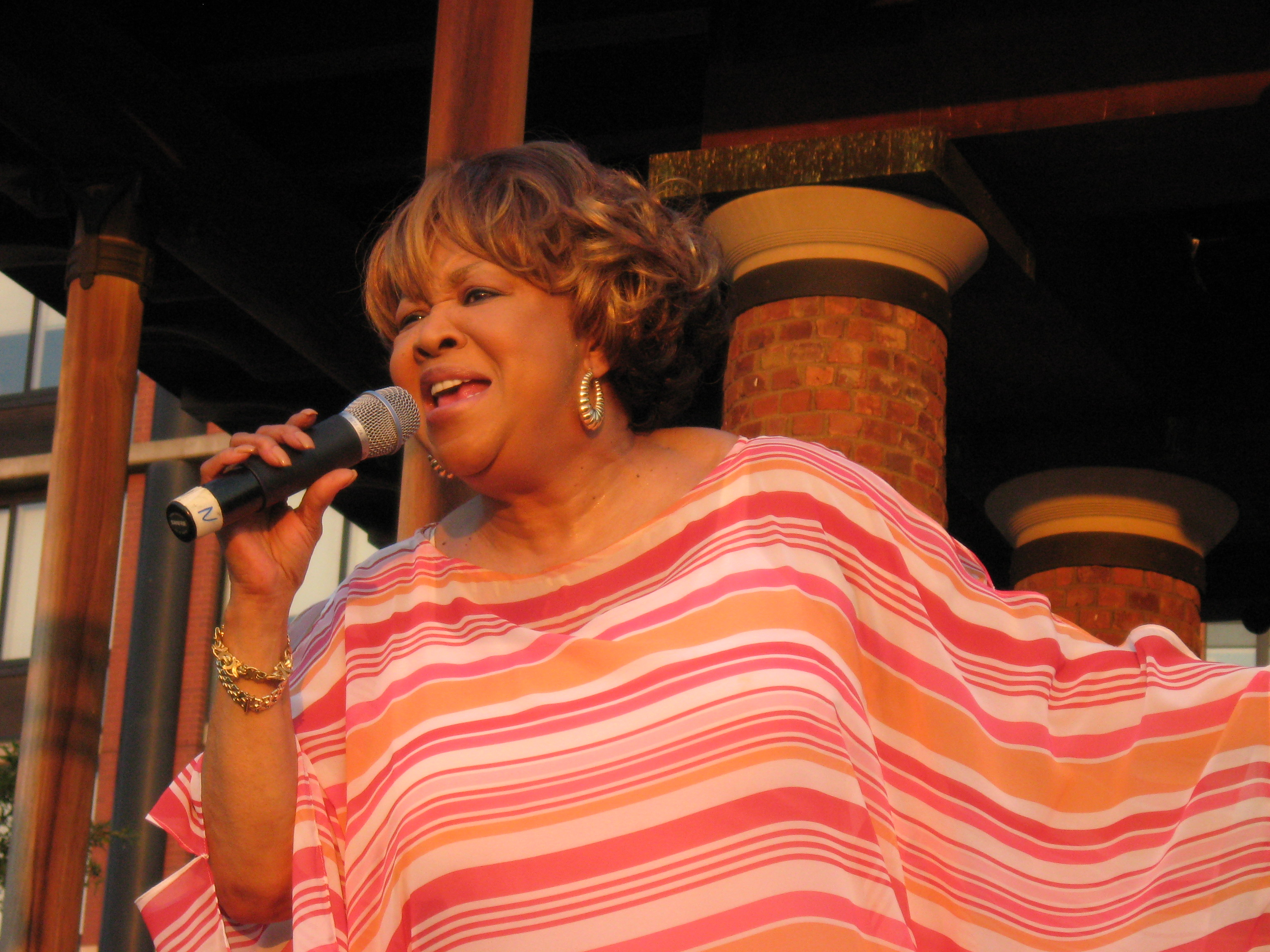
Staples singing in Brooklyn, New York (2007)

In 2009, Staples, along with Patty Griffin and The Tri-City Singers, released a version of the song "Waiting For My Child To Come Home" on the compilation album Oh Happy Day: An All-Star Music Celebration.

On October 30, 2010, Staples performed at the Rally to Restore Sanity and/or Fear alongside singer Jeff Tweedy. In 2011 she was joined on-stage at the Outside Lands Music And Arts Festival by Arcade Fire singer Win Butler. The two performed a version of "The Weight" by The Band.

Staples also performed at the 33rd Kennedy Center Honors, singing in a tribute to honoree Paul McCartney.

Staples headlined on June 10, 2012, at Chicago's Annual Blues Festival in Grant Park.

On April 9, 2013, Staples attended an event with other musicians at the White House for a celebration of soul music.

On June 27, 2015, Staples performed on the Park Stage of Glastonbury Somerset UK. On October 31, 2015, Staples performed with Joan Osborne in Washington, D.C., at The George Washington University's Lisner Auditorium as part of their Solid Soul Tour.

In February 2016, Staples's album Livin' on a High Note was released. Produced by M. Ward, the album features songs written specifically for Staples by Nick Cave, Justin Vernon, tUnE-yArds, Neko Case, Aloe Blacc, and others. Discussing the album Staples said:

I've been singing my freedom songs and I wanted to stretch out and sing some songs that were new. I told the writers I was looking for some joyful songs. I want to leave something to lift people up; I'm so busy making people cry, not from sadness, but I'm always telling a part of history that brought us down and I'm trying to bring us back up. These songwriters gave me a challenge. They gave me that feeling of, 'Hey, I can hang! I can still do this!' There's a variety, and it makes me feel refreshed and brand new. Just like Benjamin Booker wrote on the opening track, 'I got friends and I got love around me, I got people, the people who love me.' I'm living on a high note, I'm above the clouds. I'm just so grateful. I must be the happiest old girl in the world. Yes, indeed.

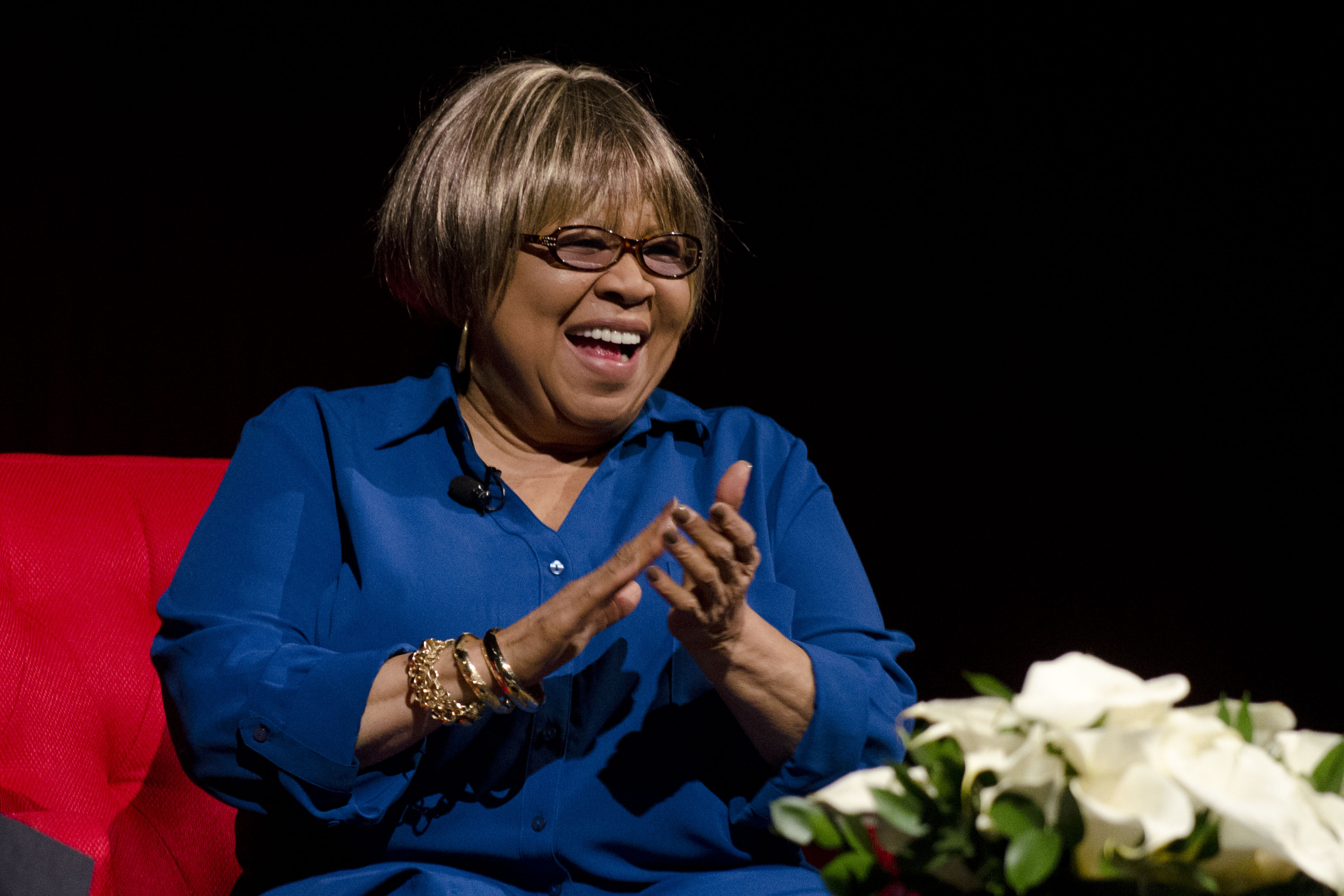
Staples at the LBJ Library in Austin, Texas (2014)

In January 2017, Staples was featured as a guest vocalist on "I Give You Power", a single from Arcade Fire benefiting the American Civil Liberties Union. In February 2017, Staples appeared on NPR's Wait, Wait ... Don't Tell Me! in the "Not My Job" segment, answering questions about the rock band The Shaggs. In April 2017, "Let Me Out", a single from the fifth studio album by Gorillaz, Humanz, was released, featuring Staples and rapper Pusha T.

Staples's sixteenth album If All I Was Was Black was released on November 17, 2017. The record was again produced by Jeff Tweedy and contains all original songs cowritten by Mavis and Tweedy. Following the release, Staples toured with Bob Dylan. She also appeared on the 2017/18 Hootenanny. In 2018, she sang on Hozier's single "Nina Cried Power".

In May 2019, Staples celebrated her 80th birthday with a concert at the Apollo Theater, 63 years after first appearing at the theater as a teenager with her family band, the Staple Singers, in 1956. The show, which featured special guest artists, including David Byrne and Norah Jones, is one of a series of collaborative concerts she staged in May to commemorate her 80th birthday. She also performed at the 2019 Glastonbury Festival.

In June 2020, Staples collaborated with Run the Jewels on the track "Pulling the Pin" from their studio album RTJ4. In 2022, Staples released Carry Me Home, a collaborative effort with the late Levon Helm that they recorded together at Helm's Midnight Ramble in 2011. In 2025, she released a new solo album entitled Sad and Beautiful World. The album's title track is a cover of the Sparklehorse song, with the album also including covers of songs by artists such as Tom Waits, Leonard Cohen, Frank Ocean and Kevin Morby.

== Film and television ==
External videos
- Mavis Staples: "I'll Take You There", 2:44, The White House

During her career, Staples has appeared in many films and television shows, including The Last Waltz, Graffiti Bridge, Wattstax, New York Undercover, Songs of Praise, Soul Train, Soul to Soul, The Psychiatrist, and The Cosby Show. Her music has been included in soundtracks for various other films and television shows such as The Help, My Blueberry Nights, Dumplin', Charlie Wilson's War, and CSI: Miami.

Staples performed the title theme song for 1989's National Lampoon's Christmas Vacation.

The documentary Lightning in a Bottle, directed by Antoine Fuqua, about the Salute to the Blues concert at Radio City Music Hall in February 2003 features a performance by Staples and many other notable musicians including B.B. King, Buddy Guy, and Bonnie Raitt.

Mavis!, the first feature documentary about Staples and the Staple Singers, directed by Jessica Edwards, had its world premiere at the South by Southwest Film Festival in March 2015. Mavis! screened in theaters and was broadcast on HBO in February 2016. In the same year, the documentary won a Peabody Award.

Staples has performed on various talk shows, including The Tonight Show with Jay Leno, Late Show with David Letterman, Conan, and The Ellen DeGeneres Show. On December 18, 2014, she was a featured performer on the final episode of The Colbert Report. On September 8, 2015, Staples was a featured performer on the premiere episode of The Late Show with Stephen Colbert.

On June 15, 2019, Staples appeared as the featured musical guest on the CBS This Morning "Saturday Sessions" segment, where she played songs from her We Get By.

Staples's performances with the Staple Singers and with Mahalia Jackson at the 1969 Harlem Cultural Festival are a highlight of the 2021 music documentary Summer of Soul.

== Personal life ==
Mavis Staples married Chicago mortician Spencer Leak in 1964; they divorced eight years later, when Staples would not end her music career to stay home. She has no children.

Staples met singer-songwriter Bob Dylan in 1962 and the two became romantically involved for a time. In the 2015 documentary Mavis!, she revealed that Dylan once proposed to her, and she turned him down, feeling that both of them were too young. The pair have remained friends and occasional collaborators ever since.

As of 2026, Mavis Staples resides in Chicago, Illinois.

== Awards and honors ==
Year	Association	Category	Nominated work	Result
1961	Grammy Awards	Best Inspirational Performance	Swing Low (with The Staples Singers)	Nominated
1968	Grammy Awards	Best Soul Gospel Performance	Long Walk to D.C. (with The Staples Singers)	Nominated
1971	Grammy Awards	Best R&B Performance by a Duo or Group with Vocals	Respect Yourself (with The Staples Singers)	Nominated
1972	Grammy Awards	Best R&B Performance by a Duo or Group with Vocals	I'll Take You There	Nominated
1973	Grammy Awards	Best R&B Performance by a Duo or Group with Vocals	"Be What You Are"	Nominated
1988	Grammy Awards	Best Soul Gospel Performance by a Duo or Group, Choir or Chorus	"Oh Happy Day" (with The Staples Singers)	Nominated
1995	CableACE Awards	Performance in a Music Special or Series	"VH1 Honors" (with Al Green and Bonnie Raitt)	Nominated
2003	Grammy Awards	Best Pop Collaboration with Vocals	"Gonna Change My Way of Thinking" (with Bob Dylan)	Nominated
2004	Grammy Awards	Best Gospel Performance	"Lay My Burden Down"	Nominated
2005	Grammy Awards	Lifetime Achievement Award	The Staples Singers	Won
2005	Blues Music Awards	Album of the Year	Have a Little Faith	Won
2005	Blues Music Awards	Soul Blues Album	Have a Little Faith	Won
2005	Blues Music Awards	Song of the Year	"Have a Little Faith"	Won
2005	Blues Music Awards	Soul Blues Female Artist	Mavis Staples	Won
2006	Blues Music Awards	Soul Blues Female Artist	Mavis Staples	Won
2007	Blues Music Awards	Soul Blues Female Artist	Mavis Staples	Nominated
2007	Americana Music Honors & Awards	Spirit of Americana/Free Speech Award	Mavis Staples	Won
2009	Grammy Awards	Best Contemporary Blues Album	Live: Hope at the Hideout	Nominated
2010	Grammy Awards	Best Americana Album	You Are Not Alone	Won
2013	Grammy Awards	Best Americana Album	One True Vine	Nominated
2015	Grammy Awards	Best American Roots Performance	"See That My Grave is Kept Clean"	Won
2017	Blues Music Awards	Soul Blues Female Artist	Mavis Staples	Won
2018	Blues Music Awards	Soul Blues Female Artist	Mavis Staples	Won
2019	Americana Music Honors & Awards	Artist of the Year	Mavis Staples	Nominated
2019	Americana Music Honors & Awards	Spirit of Americana/Free Speech Award	Mavis Staples	Won
2020	Blues Music Awards	Entertainer of the Year	Mavis Staples	Nominated
2020	Blues Music Awards	Instrumentalist - Vocals	Mavis Staples	Won
2021	UK Americana Awards	Lifetime Achievement Award	Mavis Staples	Won
2022	Grammy Awards	Album of the Year	We Are (with Jon Batiste and others, as a songwriter)	Won
2026	Grammy Awards	Best American Roots Performance	"Beautiful Strangers"	Won
2026	Grammy Awards	Best Americana Performance	"Godspeed"	Won
2027	Grammy Awards	Best Americana Performance	"Sad and Beautiful World"	Pending
2027	Grammy Awards	Best American Roots Performance	"Human Mind"	Pending
2027	Grammy Awards	Best Americana Album	Sad and Beautiful World	Pending

In 1999, The Staple Singers were inducted into the Rock and Roll Hall of Fame by Lauryn Hill.

In 2005, Mavis and the Staple Singers were honored with a Grammy Lifetime Achievement Award.

Mavis Staples is a recipient of a 2006 National Heritage Fellowship, awarded by the National Endowment for the Arts, which is the United States' highest honor in the folk and traditional arts.

Staples was named No. 56 on Rolling Stone magazine's 2008 list of the 100 Greatest Singers of All Time.

On February 13, 2011, Staples won her first Grammy award in the category for Best Americana Album for You Are Not Alone. In her acceptance speech, a shocked and crying Staples said, "This has been a long time coming".

On May 7, 2011, Staples was awarded an honorary doctorate from Berklee College of Music in Boston, Massachusetts.

On May 6, 2012, Staples was awarded an honorary doctorate, and performed "I'll Take You There" with current and graduating students at Columbia College Chicago's 2012 Commencement Exercise in Chicago, Illinois, at the historic Chicago Theatre.

Staples was recognized as a 2016 Kennedy Center Honoree at the 39th annual gala event held in Washington, D.C.

In 2017, Staples was inducted in to the Blues Hall of Fame.

In 2018, Staples received a Lifetime Achievement at the National Arts Awards.

On January 30, 2020, she received a Lifetime Achievement from the SFJAZZ Gala.

On November 6, 2021, Staples was inducted as a Laureate at the 57th Laureate Convocation of the Lincoln Academy of Illinois, and awarded the Order of Lincoln (the State's highest honor) by the Governor of Illinois.

In 2023, Rolling Stone ranked Staples at No. 46 on their list of the 200 Greatest Singers of All Time.

In 2024, Staples received the Golden Plate Award of the American Academy of Achievement, presented by Awards Council members Gen. Charles Q. Brown Jr. and Leymah Gbowee at a ceremony in New York City.

== Discography ==
- Mavis Staples (1969)
- Only for the Lonely (1970)
- Oh What a Feeling (1979)
- Time Waits for No One (1989)
- The Voice (1993)
- Spirituals & Gospel: Dedicated to Mahalia Jackson (with Lucky Peterson) (1996)
- Have a Little Faith (2004)
- We'll Never Turn Back (2007)
- You Are Not Alone (2010)
- One True Vine (2013)
- Livin' on a High Note (2016)
- If All I Was Was Black (2017)
- We Get By (2019)
- Sad and Beautiful World (2025)

Awards
Preceded by Charlie Daniels	First Amendment Center/AMA "Spirit of Americana" Free Speech Award; 2007	Succeeded by Joan Baez
