= The Wham of that Memphis Man =

The Wham of That Memphis Man

Studio album by Lonnie Mack
- Released: 1963
- Recorded: 1963, Cincinnati, Ohio
- Length: 32:16
- Label: Fraternity
- Producer: Harry Carlson

Lonnie Mack chronology
The Wham of That Memphis Man (1963)	Glad I'm in the Band (1969)

Professional ratings
Review scores
Source	Rating
AllMusic	5/5 stars
Rolling Stone	(positive)

The Wham of That Memphis Man is the first album by Lonnie Mack. It was recorded in several sessions beginning in March 1963 and was released by the small Cincinnati label Fraternity Records in October 1963. It reached just #103 on the charts, but music critic Jimmy Guterman ranked it No. 16 in his book The 100 Best Rock 'n' Roll Records of All Time.

Mack is considered a pioneer of virtuoso rock guitar soloing and a key stylistic forerunner of the blues rock and Southern rock guitar genres, for his fast-paced instrumental solos, including his 1963 hit singles, "Memphis" and "Wham!", both of which are on this album.

The album also included several Mack vocals, done primarily in the country-esque blues/gospel style for which he became well known. Regarding the vocals on this album, music critic Bill Millar said: "For consistency and depth of feeling – the best blue-eyed soul is defined by Lonnie Mack's ballads and virtually everything the Righteous Brothers recorded...Lonnie Mack wailed a soul ballad as gutsily as any black gospel singer. The anguished inflections which stamped his best songs had a directness which would have been wholly embarrassing in the hands of almost any other white vocalist."

The album has been re-released at least ten times, most recently on the Ace label in 2016.

== Track listing ==
1. "Wham!" (Lonnie Mack)
2. "Where There's a Will There's a Way" (L. Williams)
3. "The Bounce" (Charles Fizer, Walter Ward, Eddie Lewis)
4. "I'll Keep You Happy" (Hank Ballard)
5. "Memphis" (Chuck Berry)
6. "Baby What's Wrong" (Jimmy Reed)
7. "Down and Out" (Lonnie Mack)
8. "Satisfied" (Martha Carson)
9. "Susie-Q" (Dale Hawkins, Stan Lewis, Eleanor Broadwater)
10. "Why" (Lonnie Mack)
11. "Down in the Dumps" (Lonnie Mack)

The track listing shows the eleven tracks in the order in which they appeared on the original release. An expanded version of the album, incorporating the original cover art, was released in 1969 by Elektra Records under the title "For Collectors Only". It adds two 1964 tracks ("Farther on Down the Road" and "Chicken Pickin'") to those on the original release. It begins with "Wham!" as track 1, as on the original, but thereafter the track order differs completely from that of the original 1963 album.

All of the album's songs appear on the 1999 Ace CD Memphis Wham!, though not in the same order, and with some different mixes (this CD has 24 tracks in total).

== Personnel ==
- Lonnie Mack – guitar, vocals
- James Edmondson — guitar on "Memphis" and "Down in the Dumps"
- Wayne Bullock – bass
- David Byrd – keyboards
- Truman Fields – keyboards
- Fred Stemmerding - piano
- Ron Grayson – drums
- Don Henry – saxophone and maracas on "Memphis" and "Down in the Dumps"
- Marv Lieberman – saxophone
- Irv Russotto – saxophone
- Bill Jones – bass
- The Charmaines – background vocals
