= Rusty York =

American singer-songwriter (1935–2014)

- Birth name: Charles Edward York
- Born: May 24, 1935; Harlan, Kentucky, U.S.
- Died: January 26, 2014 (aged 78); Redington Shores, Florida, U.S.
- Genres: Bluegrass, country, rockabilly
- Occupation(s): Musician, guitarist, singer, songwriter
- Instrument(s): Guitar, banjo
- Years active: 1950s–2014
- Labels: Starday, King, Chess, Jewel

Charles Edward "Rusty" York (May 24, 1935 – January 26, 2014) was an American musician and singer, and member of the Rockabilly Hall of Fame. He is probably best known for his rockabilly song "Sugaree".

== Biography ==
=== Early years ===
York was born in Harlan, Kentucky. His father worked in coal mines, while having trouble holding a job. His father bought him a guitar and taught him the only chord he knew; young York was mainly self-taught.

York listened to the Grand Ole Opry on Saturday nights and to the Mid-Day Merry-Go-Round and Cas Walker programs from Knoxville radio. A 1951 concert appearance by Earl Scruggs and the Foggy Mountain Boys inspired him. York's earliest idols were bluegrass artists: Jimmie Skinner, Lester Flatt and Scruggs.

In 1952, York's family moved to the Over-the-Rhine area of Cincinnati, Ohio. Within a few weeks, his father died, and York took a kitchen job at Walt's Restaurant. As a result, he never finished high school. York later became an office boy in a stockbroker firm.

=== Musical career ===
York began playing in local clubs with Wilson Spivey during the evenings. York obtained a five-string banjo and began to learn the Scruggs style. York then started a bluegrass duo with Willard Hale, playing locally with Jimmie Skinner and Hylo Brown. They soon started playing more mostly rock-and-roll songs, but would still perform about 15 minutes of bluegrass nightly.

York and Hale cut a version of Buddy Holly's "Peggy Sue" for King, with a remake of Roy Brown's "Shake 'Em Up Baby" on the B-side. York then teamed up with Midwestern Hayride's vocalist Bonnie Lou in a rockabilly project. They recorded "Let The School Bell Ring, Ding A Ling", written by Henry Glover, backed by a cover of Billy & Lillie's hit "La Dee Dah".

=== The Cajuns ===
By 1958, York had assembled a band, the Cajuns, which consisted of York on vocals and guitar, Bill Lanham on bass, saxophone player Jimmy Risch, John Bower on piano, and Rick Lundy on drums. In 1959, the group backed Jackie Shannon (later known as Jackie DeShannon) on "Just Another Lie". The B-side, "Cajun Blues", was an instrumental by the Cajuns, and recorded for Fraternity. In 1959, they also recorded "Just Another Lie", also for Fraternity.

=== "Sugaree" ===
Later in 1959, Pat Nelson rented the King studio for an independent session intended for his PJ label. York recorded a single, with an up-tempo version of instrumental "She'll Be Coming 'Round the Mountain" on one side, re-titled "Red Rooster", and Marty Robbins' composition, "Sugaree", on the other side. In 1959, "Sugaree" reached No. 77 on the Billboard Hot 100. Soon, York toured with Dick Clark with a sellout appearance at the Hollywood Bowl. York and the Cajuns opened the show.

== Later years ==
By the 1960s, York had returned to bluegrass and turned towards country music. In 1961, he started building a studio in his garage.

By the early 1970s, York had retired from performing to concentrate on his Jewel Records imprint/studio full-time. Jewel continued to operate out of Cincinnati throughout the 1980s and 1990s, and into the 21st century. He continued to play music. After selling the Jewel Recording Studio in 2008, York and his family moved to Florida.

York died on January 26, 2014, in Redington Shores, Florida, after a long bout with degenerative brain disease. He was 78.

== Discography ==
- 1960 – Rust York and the Kentucky Mountain Boys
- 1968 – Sings Like Crazy
- 1973 – Dueling Banjos (with Lonnie Mack)
- 1981 – Rock 'n' Memories
- 2001 – Early Bluegrass
- 2004 – Rusty Rocks

== Musical contributions ==
- "Shake 'Em Up Baby"
- "Peggy Sue"
- "Sugaree"
- "Red Rooster"
- "The Lock On Your Heart"
- "Don't Do It"
- "Sadie-Mae"
- "Margaret Ann"
- "That's What I Need"
- "Just Like You"
- "Love Struck"
- "Goodnight [!!] Cincinnati, Goodmorning [!!] Tennessee"
- "Tore Up Over You"
- "Tremblin'"
- "I Might Just Walk Right Back Again"
- "Sally Was A Good Old Girl"
- "Big Man, Big House"
- "Crazy"
- "Sing The Girls A Song, Bill"
