= Fear No Evil =

Fear No Evil may refer to:

== Books ==
- Fear No Evil (book), a 1998 book by Natan Sharansky

== Films ==
- Fear No Evil (1945 film), directed by Giuseppe Maria Scotese
- Fear No Evil (1969 film), a made-for-television horror film
- Fear No Evil (1981 film), horror film directed by Frank LaLoggia

== Music ==
- Fear No Evil (Grim Reaper album), 1985
- Fear No Evil (Robert Ward album), 1991
- Fear No Evil (Slaughter album), 1995
- Fear No Evil (Doro album), 2009

== See also ==
- "...I will fear no evil", a phrase in Psalm 23 of the bible
- I Will Fear No Evil, a 1970 science fiction novel by Robert A. Heinlein
