= Plan 9 =

Plan 9 or Plan Nine may refer to:

== Music ==
- Plan 9 (band), a psychedelic rock band from Rhode Island
- Plan 9, an album by Big Guitars From Memphis with Rick Lindy
- "Plan 9", a song on the 1993 album Gorgeous by electronica band 808 State
- "Plan 9 Channel 7", a song on the 1979 album Machine Gun Etiquette by punk group The Damned
- Plan 9 Records, an independent record label that was owned by Glenn Danzig of Misfits

== Other uses ==
- Plan 9 (2015 film), an independent 2015 film as a parody remake of the original
- Plan 9 from Bell Labs, an operating system developed by Bell Laboratories as Unix's successor
  - Plan 9 from User Space, a port of many Plan 9 from Bell Labs libraries and applications to Unix-like operating systems
  - 9P (protocol), a network protocol developed as part of Plan 9 from Bell Labs sometimes referred to as Plan 9 Filesystem Protocol
- Plan 9 from Outer Space, a 1959 science fiction film directed by Ed Wood, Jr.
  - Plan 9 from Outer Space (video game), based on the film
- Plan Nine Publishing
- Breaking Benjamin, who went by "Plan 9" during 1999
