= Live! Attack of the Killer V =

Live album by Lonnie Mack
- Released: 1990
- Recorded: December 14–16, 1989
- Venue: FitzGerald's Nightclub, Berwyn, Illinois
- Genre: Blues
- Label: Alligator
- Producer: Lonnie Mack, Bruce Iglauer

Lonnie Mack chronology
Roadhouses & Dance Halls (1988)	Live! Attack of the Killer V (1990)	Live at Coco's (1998)

Live! Attack of the Killer V is an album by the American musician Lonnie Mack, released in 1990. Mack returned to Alligator Records due to displeasure with his previous label, Epic Records. Its title was inspired by Mack's Gibson Flying V guitar and popular news stories about killer bees. Mack supported the album with a North American tour.

== Production ==
Produced by Mack and Alligator Records label head Bruce Iglauer, the album was recorded December 14–16, 1989, at FitzGerald's Nightclub. Mack was backed by Dumpy Rice on piano, Maxwell Schauf on drums, and Michael Freeman on bass. He used a Bigsby whammy bar. "I Found a Love" is a cover of the Wilson Pickett song. "Riding the Blinds" was written by Don Nix. "The Move" is an instrumental.

== Critical reception ==
Professional ratings
Review scores
Source	Rating
All Music Guide to the Blues	3/5 stars
The Cincinnati Enquirer	3.5/5 stars
The Encyclopedia of Popular Music	2/5 stars
The Rolling Stone Album Guide	2/5 stars
The Tampa Tribune	3.5/4 stars

The Washington Post noted that "even more impressive than his long shadow is just how powerful, vital and convincing his voice and guitar remain." USA Today listed the album among the best live releases of 1990. The Cincinnati Enquirer praised the "sneaky blues lines".

The Tampa Tribune called Live! "a convincing, caught-live players album." The Morning Call labeled Mack "one of the most versatile and ferocious performers going." The Age said that his playing "is as fast, clear and crisp as ever."

== Track listing ==
No.	Title	Length
1.	"Riding the Blinds"
2.	"Natural Disaster"
3.	"Stop"
4.	"Medley: Camp Washington Chili/If You Have to Know"
5.	"Satisfy Suzie"
6.	"I Found a Love"
7.	"The Move"
8.	"Cincinnati Jail"
