= Let Them Talk (Little Willie John song) =

"Let Them Talk" is a 1959 Little Willie John song written by Sonny Thompson, on King Records produced by Henry Glover. The lyrics begin: "Let them talk if they want to, talk don't bother me... I want the whole wide world to know: I love you so..."

The song has been covered by many artists including George Benson, James Booker on his album Live from Belle Vue (2015), Lonnie Mack on his album Glad I'm in the Band (1969), James Brown on his album Say It Loud - I'm Black and I'm Proud (1969), and was the title track for albums by Marva Wright (2000), Gary U.S. Bonds (2009) and Hugh Laurie (2011).
