= Rhythm of the People =

Studio album by Robert Ward
- Released: 1993
- Studio: Arlyn
- Genre: R&B, blues
- Label: Black Top
- Producer: Hammond Scott

Robert Ward chronology
Fear No Evil (1991)	Rhythm of the People (1993)	Hot Stuff (1995)

Rhythm of the People is an album by the American musician Robert Ward, released in 1993.

== Production ==
Produced by Hammond Scott, the majority of the album was recorded at Arlyn Studios, in Austin, Texas. "I Found a Love" was recorded in New Orleans, with bass player George Porter Jr. The Kamikaze Horns played on some of the songs. Ward's wife Roberta sang on some of the gospel-influenced tracks. Ward used his Magnatone amp on the album. The musician felt that Rhythm of the People was a better representation of his musical interests than his previous album, Fear No Evil.

== Critical reception ==
Professional ratings
Review scores
Source	Rating
AllMusic	2.5/5 stars
Chicago Tribune	3/4 stars
Robert Christgau	(dud)
DownBeat	2/5 stars
The Encyclopedia of Popular Music	3/5 stars
Los Angeles Times	3.5/4 stars
MusicHound Blues: The Essential Album Guide	3/5 stars
Toronto Sun	4/5 stars

The Edmonton Journal noted that "Ward's taste for fast, gutsy, clear, making-every-note-count attacks on the fingerboard was an influence on Stevie Ray Vaughan and others." The Chicago Tribune stated that "a couple of alleged originals borrow too heavily from vintage R & B sources." The Denver Post opined that "the element of surprise is gone—and some of Ward's new songs are a little preachy... But there still are enough beautiful classic-soul moments."

The Gazette determined that "a tastier mix of contemporary soul, gospel and R&B is hard to imagine." The Los Angeles Times concluded that "Ward seems so re-energized that he occasionally pushes his voice too hard, but the music is punchier and its gospel-rooted flavor and message are even more in evidence." The Toronto Sun deemed the album "essential for anyone who's ever thrilled to the sounds of Stax-Volt, Motown, or '60s soul and R & B in general."

AllMusic wrote that Ward's "vocals don't sound nearly as hearty this time around, and a some of the songs just aren't up to par."

== Track listing ==
No.	Title	Length
1.	"A Good Man"
2.	"The Real Deal"
3.	"Say What You Mean"
4.	"White Fox"
5.	"You Can't Stop My Lovin' Now"
6.	"Children of the World (Don't Forget to Pray)"
7.	"All Proud Races"
8.	"I Do What I Want"
9.	"What a Friend We Have in Jesus"
10.	"Some Things"
11.	"Soap Opera Blues"
12.	"I Found a Love"
13.	"Twiggs County"
