= Hound Dog Man =

Hound Dog Man may refer to:

- Hound-Dog Man, a 1959 film

- The title song, "Hound-Dog Man", from the film by Fabian Forte

- "Hound Dog Man", an American song written by Tommy Stuart (ASCAP). Stuart allowed 1/6th credit to Barbara Orbison & 1/6th credit to Terry Woodford on the sales of this version only due to some word changes Woodford & Orbison had made leaving Stuart with 2/3 writers on the sales, 100% on the airplay and no credits for anyone else on any other version released. In tribute to Elvis Presley, Roy Orbison performed the song on Austin City Limits.
- "Hound Dog Man", a song recorded by Lonnie Mack with Stevie Ray Vaughan, from the 1985 album Strike Like Lightning
- "Hound Dog Man", a song recorded by Glen Campbell, from the 1979 album Highwayman (Glen Campbell album). Campbell performed the song live at Ford's Theatre in Washington, D.C. in 1979 with President Jimmy Carter and First Lady Rosalynn Carter in the audience.
