= Reason Amplifier Company =

- Company type: Private
- Industry: Musical instruments
- Founded: c. 2008
- Founder: Obeid Khan, Anthony Bonadio
- Headquarters: St. Louis, Missouri, U.S.
- Products: Guitar amplifiers, speaker cabinets

Reason Amplifier Company was an American manufacturer of high-end, boutique guitar amplifiers and speaker cabinets based in St. Louis, Missouri. Founded by amp designer Obeid Khan and cabinet builder Anthony Bonadio, the company was known for its "StackMode" technology, which allowed two independent amplifier channels to be played in series.

== History ==
Reason Amplifiers was formed when Obeid Khan, an electrical engineer and amp designer, approached Anthony Bonadio, a veteran cabinet maker, to build a housing for a new amplifier prototype. Khan had previously gained industry prominence for his work at St. Louis Music, where he designed the Ampeg Vintage Club series and the Crate Blue Voodoo and Vintage Series. Bonadio brought experience in high-end speaker enclosure design and manufacturing for other boutique brands.

The company name was derived from the founders' philosophy that a new amplifier company should only exist if there was a "reason" to create a design that offered a distinct functional advantage over existing paradigms.

== Technical Innovation: StackMode ==
The hallmark of the Reason amplifier line was a proprietary circuit design coined "StackMode" by Obeid Khan. While most multi-channel amplifiers operate in an "A/B" fashion (switching between one channel or the other), StackMode allowed the user to run the "Normal" and "Bright" channels in series. In this mode, the signal from the first channel flows into the second, allowing the gain and EQ of the first stage to shape the behavior of the second.

The company produced a range of matching cabinets, designed by Bonadio with specific internal dimensions to complement the frequency response of the StackMode circuitry.

== Legacy ==
The company's partnership eventually concluded as the founders moved on to other projects. Obeid Khan went on to found Khan Audio and played a central role in the modern revival of the Magnatone amplifier brand. His later "Khan Pak" series and other designs continue to utilize the engineering principles and "bright-voiced" design philosophies established during the Reason years.

== See also ==
- Guitar amplifier
- Boutique amplifier
- Magnatone
