= Lonnie Mack =

American musician (1941–2016)

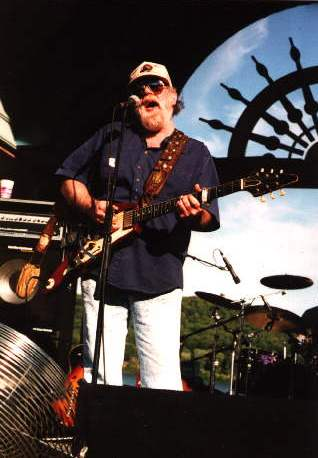
- Mack in 2003

Background information
- Born: Lonnie McIntosh; July 18, 1941; West Harrison, Indiana, U.S.
- Died: April 21, 2016 (aged 74) Nashville, Tennessee, U.S.
- Genres: Blues rock; blue-eyed soul; blues; country; Southern rock; rockabilly; gospel; bluegrass
- Occupations: Musician; songwriter
- Instruments: Guitar; vocals
- Years active: 1954–2004; 2007–2011
- Labels: Fraternity; Elektra; Alligator; Capitol; Jewel; King; Ace; Epic; Flying V; Sage; Esta Records

Lonnie McIntosh (July 18, 1941 – April 21, 2016), known as Lonnie Mack, was an American singer-songwriter and guitarist. He was an early influence in the development of blues rock music, Southern rock music, and rock guitar soloing.

Mack emerged in 1963 with his breakthrough LP, The Wham of that Memphis Man. It earned him lasting renown as both a blue-eyed soul singer and a lead guitar innovator. The album's instrumental tracks included two hit singles, "Memphis" and "Wham". In them, Mack, using "top-quality technique" and "pristine" phrasing, added "edgy, aggressive, loud, and fast" melodies and runs to the predominant chords-and-riffs pattern of early rock guitar. Mack's early instrumentals raised the bar for rock guitar proficiency, helped launch the electric guitar to the top of soloing instruments in rock, and served as prototypes for the lead guitar styles of blues rock and Southern rock.

Shortly after the album's release, however, the British Invasion hit American shores, and Mack's recording career "withered on the vine". He regularly toured small venues until 1968, when Rolling Stone magazine rediscovered him, and Elektra Records signed him to a three-album contract. He was soon performing in major venues, but his multi-genre Elektra albums downplayed his lead guitar and blues rock appeal and record sales were modest. He became increasingly unhappy with the music business during this period and finally left Elektra in 1971. Over the next fourteen years, he functioned as a low-profile multi-genre recording artist, roadhouse performer, sideman, and music-venue proprietor.

In 1985, Mack resurfaced with a successful blues rock LP, Strike Like Lightning, a promotional tour featuring celebrity guitarist sit-ins, and a Carnegie Hall concert with Roy Buchanan and Albert Collins. In 1986, he headlined the Great American Guitar Assault Tour with Buchanan and Dickey Betts. In 1990, he released another well-received blues rock album, Lonnie Mack Live! Attack of the Killer V, then retired from recording. He continued to perform, mostly in small venues, until 2004.

== Early life and musical influences ==
Shortly before Mack's birth, his family moved from Appalachian (eastern) Kentucky to Dearborn County, Indiana, on the banks of the Ohio River. One of five children, he was born to parents Robert and Sarah Sizemore McIntosh on July 18, 1941, in West Harrison, Indiana, near Cincinnati, Ohio. He was raised on a series of nearby sharecropping farms.

Using a floor-model radio powered by a truck battery, his family routinely listened to the Grand Ole Opry country music show. Continuing to listen after the rest of the family had retired for the night, Mack became a fan of rhythm and blues and traditional black gospel music.

He began playing guitar at the age of seven, after trading his bicycle for a Lone Ranger model acoustic guitar. His mother taught him basic chords, and he was soon playing bluegrass guitar in the family band. Mack recalled that when he was "seven or eight years old" an uncle from Texas introduced him to blues guitar and that when he was about ten years of age, an "old black man" named Wayne Clark introduced him to "Robert Johnson style guitar". He soon taught himself to merge finger-picking country guitar with acoustic blues-picking, to produce a hybrid style which, Mack said, "sounded like rockabilly, but before rockabilly".

His musical influences remained diverse as he refined his playing and singing styles. In his pre-teen years, Mack was mentored by blind singer-guitarist Ralph Trotto, a country-gospel performer. Mack cited country picker Merle Travis, blues guitarist T-Bone Walker, R&B guitarist Robert Ward, and pop/jazz guitarist Les Paul as significant guitar influences. Significant vocal influences included R&B singers Jimmy Reed, Ray Charles, Bobby "Blue" Bland, and Hank Ballard, country singer George Jones, traditional black gospel singer Archie Brownlee, and soul music singer Wilson Pickett. Mack recorded tunes associated with most of these artists.

== Career ==
Mack's career-long pattern of switching and mixing within the entire range of white and black Southern roots music genres made him "as difficult to market as he was to describe." He enjoyed periods of significant commercial success as a rock artist in the 1960s and 1980s, but was mostly absent from the rock spotlight for two long stretches of his career (1971–1984 and 1991–2004), during which he continued to perform, mostly in small venues, as a roots-rock "cult figure". In the end, his "influence and standing among musicians far exceeded his (commercial) success."

In 1954, at age 13, Mack dropped out of school after a fight with a teacher. Large and mature-looking for his age, he obtained a counterfeit ID and began performing professionally in bars around Cincinnati with a band led by drummer Hoot Smith. As a 14-year-old professional electric guitarist in 1955, he "was earning $300. per week—more than most workers in the area's casket and whiskey factories." At 15, he was performing on local TV with his band, the Twilighters. He played guitar on several low-circulation recordings in the late 1950s.

In the early 1960s he became a session guitarist with Fraternity Records, a small Cincinnati label. In 1963, he recorded two hit singles for Fraternity, the proto-blues-rock guitar instrumentals "Memphis" and "Wham!". He soon recorded additional tunes to flesh out his debut album, The Wham of that Memphis Man. Mack made some notable recordings later, particularly in the 1980s, but his debut album (released October 1963) is widely considered the centerpiece of his career. It became a perennial critics' favorite:

- 1968: Guitar: "...in a class by himself."...Vocals: "...sincerity and intensity that's hard to find anywhere." – Alec Dubro, Rolling Stone, calling for re-issuance of Mack's discontinued 1963 debut album.
- 1987: "With so many trying to copy this same style, this album sounds surprisingly modern. Not many have done it this well, though." – Gregory Himes, The Washington Post
- 1992: "The first of the guitar-hero records is also one of the best, and for perhaps the last time, the singing on such a disc is worthy of the guitar histrionics." – Jimmy Guterman, ranking the album No. 16 in The 100 Best Rock 'n' Roll Records of All Time
- 2007: "...a spectacular feast of down-home blues, gospel, R&B, and country chicken-pickin'...a unique vision of American roots music [that was] five years ahead of the British blues-rockers." – Dave Rubin, Inside the Blues, 1942–1982
- 2016: "Of all the Mack material available this is the one [album] I'd regard as absolutely essential." – Dave Stephens, Toppermost

He recorded many additional sides for Fraternity between 1963 and 1967, but few, if any, were broadly released or strongly promoted, and none charted. Three decades later, Ace Records (UK) packaged the entirety of Mack's Fraternity output (previously released, unreleased, alternate takes, and demos) in a series of compilations. In the mid-1960s, however, Mack's commercial prospects were stymied by Fraternity's thin financial resources and, even more, by the arrival of the overwhelmingly popular British Invasion only two months after release of The Wham of that Memphis Man. "It looked like the guitar wizard was ready to bust out when the music world was turned on its ear. [In] February 1964, The Beatles appeared on the Ed Sullivan Show, and Mack's [recording] career withered on the vine."

Although his recording career had stalled, Mack stayed busy as a performer, criss-crossing the country with one-night stands. "The '60s, man, we was full of piss and vinegar, nothing bothered us. We had bennies, like the truckers had [and] we just stayed on the road all the time." During that time, "[we] performed with just about everybody, [from] Jimi Hendrix [to] The Everly Brothers, Chuck Berry, and Dick and Dee Dee." He also took on session work with James Brown, Freddie King, Joe Simon, Albert Washington, and other R&B/soul artists.

In 1968, at the height of the blues-rock era, Elektra Records bought out Mack's dormant Fraternity recording contract and moved him to Los Angeles to record three albums. In November 1968, the newly founded Rolling Stone magazine published a rave review of Mack's discontinued 1963 debut album, persuading Elektra to re-issue it. He was soon performing in major rock venues, including the Fillmore East, the Fillmore West, and the Cow Palace. He opened for Elektra label-mate The Doors and played lead guitar for them at multiple concert tour appearances. He also shared the stage with Crosby, Stills & Nash, Johnny Winter, and Elvin Bishop, among others.

It was the hippie era, however, and Mack's rustic, blue-collar persona made for a rough fit with commercial rock's target demographic. John Morthland wrote: "[All] the superior chops in the world couldn't hide the fact that chubby, country Mack probably had more in common with Kentucky truck drivers than he did with the new rock audience." In addition, after two multi-genre Elektra albums (both recorded in 1969) that downplayed his blues-rock strengths, including his guitar, Mack himself was dissatisfied: "My music wasn't working that good then. I ain’t really happy with a lot of the stuff I did there."

At that point in his career, Mack took a break from performing and recording. According to The Doors' lead guitarist Robbie Krieger, Mack was seen during this period "selling Bibles out of the back of his car." He also worked as a talent scout for Elektra's A&R department, where he was instrumental in the signing of Mickey Newbury. In 1971, with one album left to complete his contract with Elektra, Mack moved to Nashville. There, he recorded The Hills of Indiana, a multi-genre (but country-flavored) LP with a vocal emphasis. It included only one track showcasing his guitar virtuosity, "Asphalt Outlaw Hero". The Hills of Indiana attracted little attention.

Early in his time with Elektra, Mack began missing the connection he had felt with small-town audiences and, in time, he soured on the fantasy of rock celebrity status. "[It had] a lot to do with how much value you put on money as opposed to what makes you happy. I wasn't happy. So one of the best-feeling moments I ever had was when that L.A. sign was in my rear-view mirror and I was free again." On another occasion, Mack said: "Seems like every time I get close to really making it, to climbing to the top of the mountain, that's when I pull out. I just pull up and run." Upon Mack's death in 2016, music historian Dick Shurman observed that Mack's temperament "wasn't suited to stardom. I think he'd rather have been hunting and fishing. He didn't like cities or the (music) business."

In 1971, with his Elektra contract completed, Mack went home to southern Indiana, where, for more than a decade, he was a roadhouse performer, sideman, and low-profile country/bluegrass recording artist. During this period, he reportedly lived "on a riverbank" with no telephone or electricity while owning and operating a nightclub in Covington, Kentucky, and an outdoor country music venue in Friendship, Indiana.

In 1974, his composition "Watch Out for Lucy" was recorded by both Dobie Gray and Bobby Penn. Gray managed to get to no. 107 on the US Hot 100 Bubbling Under chart in September, and Penn got to no. 56 on the Cash Box Country Top 75 in October.

In 1975, Mack was shot during an altercation with an off-duty police officer. The experience inspired Mack's tune, "Cincinnati Jail", a rowdy, guitar-and-vocal rock number that he favored in live performances later in his career.

In 1983, Mack relocated to Austin, Texas, for a collaboration with his blues-rock disciple, guitarist Stevie Ray Vaughan. Vaughan persuaded Mack to return to the studio, with Vaughan in production and backup roles, but Mack's return was postponed by a lengthy illness that Mack attributed to "so much drinkin' and carryin' on". In 1985, Mack staged a "full-fledged comeback" with the blues-rock album, Strike Like Lightning (co-produced by Vaughan and Mack), a tour featuring guest appearances by Vaughan, Ry Cooder, Keith Richards, and Ronnie Wood, and a concert at Carnegie Hall with Albert Collins and Roy Buchanan.

In 1986, Mack joined Buchanan and Dickey Betts for the Great American Guitar Assault Tour. He released three more albums over the next four years, including his last, in 1990, a blues-rock LP entitled Lonnie Mack Live! – Attack of the Killer V!. Then, worn from the constant touring required to sell records, he ended his recording career. However, he continued to play the roadhouse and festival circuits at his own pace through 2004.

== "Memphis" and "Wham!" ==
On March 12, 1963, at the end of a recording session backing the Charmaines, Mack was offered the remaining twenty minutes of studio-rental time. He recorded an energetic instrumental take-off on Chuck Berry's "Memphis, Tennessee". He had improvised it a few years earlier, when his keyboardist, Denzil "Dumpy" Rice, who normally sang and played the Berry tune, missed a performance. Mack didn't know the tune's lyrics, but when the audience called for it, he improvised a highly embellished electric guitar instrumental grounded in Berry's melody. He made the instrumental a regular feature of his live act, calling it simply "Memphis".

As recorded in 1963, "Memphis" featured a brisk melodic blues solo within a rockabilly/Memphis soul framework, augmented by a rock drum-beat. It represented a significant advance in rock guitar virtuosity, beyond both the prevailing chords-and-riffs standard of Chuck Berry and the "inherently simple" melodic solos of earlier rock guitar icons, e.g., Link Wray, Duane Eddy and Hank Marvin.

Mack recalled that, upon recording the tune, "It didn't mean a thing to me. I left to go on the road. We hit every roadhouse between Cincinnati and Miami, but we didn't have time to listen to the radio, so I didn't know what was going on [until] we were backing Chubby Checker one night. [T]he disc jockey came runnin' up to me, saying, 'You got the No. 1 record on our station!'" By late June, "Memphis" had risen to No. 4 on Billboard's R&B chart and No. 5 on Billboard's pop chart. According to The Book of Golden Discs, it sold over one million copies. The popularity of "Memphis" led to bookings at larger venues, at least one tour in the UK, and performances with Chuck Berry.

Still in 1963, Mack released "Wham!", a gospel-esque guitar rave-up. It reached No. 24 on Billboard's Pop chart in September. Although "Memphis" was the bigger hit, many associate the faster-paced "Wham!" (and the lesser-known, but still faster "Chicken-Pickin" from 1964) with the guitar style he pioneered. From Legends of Rock Guitar:

[In Wham!, Mack] can be heard using the chordal licks of early rock guitar greats, but he infuses his breaks with string bends, pentatonic runs, and mature blues chops, all of which eventually became trademarks of Eric Clapton, Mike Bloomfield and Stevie Ray Vaughan...A tight chordal riff laid over a fast boogie-woogie rhythm sets the tone for the cut, which contains guitar breaks, vibrato arm highlights, echoey single-note lines, and the repetitive string-pushing licks that eventually became so prevalent in Jeff Beck's guitar style.

Mack's early guitar recordings remain closely identified with the dawn of virtuoso blues-rock guitar. Music critic Bill Millar: "The term ‘influential’ is applied to almost anyone these days but there's still a case for saying that the massively popular blues-rock guitar genre can be traced way back to the strength, power and emotional passion of Lonnie Mack."

== Guitar style and technique ==
While still a child, Mack learned fleet-fingered bluegrass and country guitar styles while playing at home in his "family band". By his late teens, Mack had expanded his six-string repertoire to include blues, rockabilly, and the percussive chordal riffing of early rock's Chuck Berry.

In the early 1960s, using a bluegrass-style flatpicking technique, he innovated rock guitar solos with a then-perceived "peculiar running quality" at "a million notes per minute". By 1963, the year of "Memphis" and "Wham!", Mack's ability to rapidly "exploit the entire range" of the guitar with "top-quality technique" and "pristine" phrasing was considerably above the rock music standard. In "Memphis", "Wham!", "Chicken Pickin", "Suzie-Q", and other early-1960s instrumentals, he augmented rock guitar's then-prevailing chords-and-riffs accompaniment style with brisk leads combining melodies, runs, and "mature blues chops". His pattern of alternating between agile melodic leads and rhythmic chordal riffs was soon emulated by Jeff Beck and later by Stevie Ray Vaughan, among others.

Mack enhanced his guitar sound with vibrato effects. In his early recordings, he used a 1950s-era Magnatone amplifier to produce a constant, electronically generated, watery-sounding vibrato, in the style of R&B guitarist Robert Ward. Throughout his career, he also used a manually operated Bigsby vibrato arm to bend the pitch selectively. He typically cradled the arm in the fourth finger of his picking hand, toggling it while continuing to pick. He often fanned it rapidly to the tempo of his simultaneous tremolo picking, to produce a machine-gunned, single-note, "shuddering" sound. Neil Young considers Mack a vibrato arm pioneer: "Did I do that first? No. You've got to look at guys like Lonnie Mack. He showed everybody how to use a [vibrato arm]." Reportedly, the device was given its common nickname, "whammy bar", in recognition of Mack's early demonstration of skill with it in "Wham!".

While some of Mack's signature performance elements had appeared in early rock saxophone and keyboard solos, a seamless combination of all was essentially unheard in rock guitar before Mack. Rock historian Dave Stephens rates Mack's overall guitar sound "highly distinctive, dare I say, unique; in the early rock era only Link Wray and Duane Eddy could match him for instant recognition."

== Mack's role in the evolution of rock lead guitar ==
Although notable commercial success was periodic and fleeting, Mack's early-1960s recordings became rock guitar trendsetters. They raised the bar for rock guitar proficiency, helped propel the electric guitar to the top of soloing instruments in rock, and served as prototypes for the genres of blues rock and Southern rock.

Interviewed for a biography of Southern rock guitar legend Duane Allman, guitarist and early Allman associate Mike Johnstone recalled the professional impact of Mack's rock guitar proficiency when he and Allman were starting out:

Now, [in 1963], there was a popular song on the radio called 'Memphis'—an instrumental by Lonnie Mack. It was the best guitar-playing I'd ever heard. All the guitar-players were [saying] 'How could anyone ever play that good? That's the new bar. That's how good you have to be now.'

Another player of that era observed: "Lonnie Mack made the other guitar-slingers of the day – Duane Eddy, Dick Dale, the Ventures – sound tame by comparison. Only Travis Wammack and Link Wray came close."

Mack's "edgy, aggressive, loud, and fast" blues guitar sound is also credited with a key role in the electric guitar's rise to the top of soloing instruments in rock. Blues critic Shawn Hagood wrote:

His playing was faster, louder, more aggressive than anything people were used to hearing. He essentially paved the way for the electric guitar to become a soloing instrument in rock music. A true blues-rock pioneer, the genre would not have been the same – indeed, much of rock music might not have been the same – without his innovative way of treating the electric guitar as a lead soloing instrument in rock – edgy, aggressive, loud and fast.

Former Elektra A&R executive James Webber agrees:

Lonnie took rock guitar playing to a whole different level. You had to really play now. [B]efore Lonnie, the sax guys did all of the lead work. He made the guitar the preeminent lead instrument.

Mack's early-1960s guitar tracks are said to have set the stage for blues-rock guitar and Southern rock guitar, styles that first enjoyed broad popularity a few years later. From Legends of Rock Guitar (1997):

[Mack] is essentially the missing guitar link between the twangy, multi-string riffing of rockabilly and the bluesy, string-pushing players of the mid-sixties. He also made the crucial bridge between the black blues and white hillbilly music via his lead work...In all, it is not an exaggeration to say that Lonnie Mack was well ahead of his time in 1963. His bluesy solos predated the pioneering blues-rock guitar work of Jeff Beck, Eric Clapton, and Mike Bloomfield by nearly two years. [Since] they are considered "before their time", the chronological significance of Lonnie Mack for the world of rock guitar is that much more remarkable.

Southern rock (Allman Brothers) lead guitarist Warren Haynes expressed a similar assessment:

Guitar players, true musicians, and real music fans realize that Lonnie was the Jimi Hendrix of his time. Between the era of Chuck Berry and the era of Hendrix there were a handful of guitar players like Lonnie Mack who were making ground-breaking music that paved the way for the [lead guitar] Revolution. People like Dickey Betts and Stevie Ray Vaughan would tell you that without Lonnie they wouldn't be who they were. That goes for all of us.

Mack's 1963 debut album has been called "the first of the guitar hero records" for its introduction of flashy, technically challenging melodies and runs to rock guitar solos. As such, it is said to have begun rock guitar's "modern" era. In 1980, "Memphis" (1963) led Guitar World magazine's list of rock guitar's top-five "landmark" recordings, ahead of entire albums by Jimi Hendrix, Eric Clapton, Elvin Bishop, and Mike Bloomfield, whose own late-1960s blues-infused solos exemplified rock's lead guitar "revolution".

According to The New York Times, Mack's guitar style was "a seminal influence on a long list of British and American" rock guitar soloists. Guitarists who have identified Mack as a major or significant influence include Stevie Ray Vaughan (blues rock), Jeff Beck (blues rock, jazz-rock), Neil Young (hard rock; country-tinged folk rock), Ted Nugent (hard rock), Dickey Betts (Southern rock), Warren Haynes (Southern rock), Ray Benson (Western swing), Rick Derringer (hard rock; blues rock), Bootsy Collins (funk), Adrian Belew (impressionist rock), Wayne Perkins (multi-genre), and Tyler Morris (multi-genre). According to a variety of sources, Mack similarly influenced guitarists Joe Bonamassa (blues rock), Eric Clapton (blues rock), Duane Allman (Southern rock), Gary Rossington (Southern rock), Steve Gaines (Southern rock), Dan Toler (Southern rock), Mike Bloomfield (blues rock), Jerry Garcia (psychedelic rock), Jimi Hendrix (psychedelic blues rock), Keith Richards (blues rock), Jimmy Page (blues rock), and Danny Gatton (blues rock; jazz rock).

Mack said: "It's a great honor to be able to [inspire other artists]. What you do in this business, your whole thing is givin' stuff away. But that makes you feel good, makes you feel like you've really done something."

== Mack's 1958 Gibson Flying V Guitar, "Number 7" ==
Mack was closely identified with the distinctive-looking Gibson Flying V guitar that first appeared in 1958. When he was seventeen, he bought the seventh Flying V off the first-year production line, naming it "Number 7". Mack was viscerally attracted to the arrow-like shape of the guitar. Mack played "Number 7" almost exclusively throughout his career. The title of Mack's final album, Attack of the Killer V, was a reference to his guitar.

Early in his career, Mack added a Bigsby vibrato bar to the guitar. It required mounting a steel crossbeam approximately six inches below the apex of the "V", giving the guitar a unique appearance. Mack favored thick (heavy) strings, i.e., .010, .012, .018w, .028, .038, .052. He typically only bent the first (higher) two, and used a wound string only for the third. He said that the wound third string was important to his sound.

In 1993, Gibson Guitar Corporation issued a limited-run "Lonnie Mack Signature Edition" of Number 7. In 2010, it was featured in Star Guitars: 101 Guitars That Rocked The World. In 2011, Walter Carter, author of The Guitar Collection, named Number 7 one of the world's "150 most elite guitars". In 2012, Rolling Stone magazine named it one of "20 iconic guitars".

After Mack's death, "Number 7" was held by his heirs until it was sold at auction for $550,000. on October 15, 2026.

== "Blue-eyed soul" vocals ==
Throughout his career, Mack's vocals blended white and black Southern roots influences. One commentator dubbed his singing style "country-esque blues". His best-known vocals were gospel-inspired "blue-eyed soul" ballads. Most failed to chart, but they have consistently drawn praise from critics and popular music historians:

- 1968: "It is truly the voice of Lonnie Mack that sets him apart...primarily a gospel singer...sincerity and intensity that's hard to find anywhere." – Alec Dubro, Rolling Stone
- 1983: "Ultimately—for consistency and depth of feeling—the best blue-eyed soul is defined by Lonnie Mack's ballads and virtually everything The Righteous Brothers recorded. Lonnie Mack wailed a soul ballad as gutsily as any black gospel singer. The anguished inflections which stamped his best songs had a directness which would have been wholly embarrassing in the hands of almost any other white vocalist." – Bill Millar, History of Rock
- 1992: "The first of the guitar-hero records is also one of the best. And for perhaps the last time, the singing on such a disc was worthy of the guitar." – Jimmy Guterman, The 100 Best Rock 'n' Roll Records Of All Time
- 2001: ""Why?", Mack wails, transforming it into a word of three syllables. "Why-y-y?" It's sweaty slow-dance stuff, with an organ intro, a stinging guitar solo, and, after the last emotional chorus, four simple notes on the guitar as a coda. There's no sadder, dustier, beerier song in all of Rock". – James Curtis, Fortune
- 2002: "For me, his vocal records became a metaphor for soul music; when I heard them, I finally understood what the term meant." – Randy McNutt, Guitar Towns
- 2009: "[Mack's "Why?" (1963) is] the greatest deep soul record ever made ... you can feel the ground shaking under [Mack's] feet ... a cry of anguish so extreme you have to close your eyes in shame over witnessing it ... Mack's scream at the end has never been matched. God help us if anyone ever tops it. – Greil Marcus, Songs Left Out of Nan Goldin's Ballad of Sexual Dependency
- 2016: "Up to April the 21st 2016, the day he died, Lonnie Mack was the best living white soul singer in the world, so good that he could even be mentioned in the same sentence as some of the all-time great black stars of what is essentially a black genre, and yes, I'm talking about the likes of Bobby Bland, Wilson Pickett and others." – Dave Stephens, Toppermost
- 2021: "A major branch of Soul straddled the line between R&B and Country. The blue-eyed soul singer who might best demonstrate this is Lonnie Mack, [whose] influence and standing among musicians far exceeded his [commercial] success." – James E. Perrone, Listen To Soul! Exploring a Musical Genre

Representative blue-eyed-soul vocals from his catalog include:

- "Why" (The Wham of that Memphis Man, 1963)
- "Where There's A Will" (The Wham of that Memphis Man, 1963)
- "Baby, What's Wrong?" (The Wham of that Memphis Man, 1963)
- "Satisfied" (The Wham of that Memphis Man, 1963)
- "She Don't Come Here Anymore" (Glad I'm in the Band, 1969)
- "Let Them Talk" (Glad I'm in the Band, 1969)
- "My Babe" (Whatever's Right 1969)
- "Gotta Be An Answer" (Whatever's Right, 1969)
- "Stormy Monday" (live, Live at Coco's, rec. 1983, rel. 1999)
- "Why" (live, Live at Coco's, rec. 1983, rel. 1999)
- "The Things I Used To Do" (live, Live at Coco's, rec. 1983, rel. 1999)
- "Stop" (Strike Like Lightning, 1985)
- "I Found A Love" (live, Attack of the Killer V, 1990)
- "Stop" (live, Attack of the Killer V, 1990)

== Final years ==
Mack released his final album, Live! Attack of the Killer V, in 1990, but continued to perform, mostly in small venues, into the early 2000s. His last commercial performances were in 2004. Although he soon found that he "miss[ed] the stage, performing, and making people happy", he remained retired except for a handful of isolated special appearances over the next few years:

On February 17, 2007, he performed "Cincinnati Jail" at a Nashville organ-transplant benefit concert for Pure Prairie League singer-bassist Michael Reilly. On November 15, 2008, he performed "Wham!" at the Rock and Roll Hall of Fame's 93rd birthday salute to electric guitar pioneer, Les Paul. Later in the evening, he participated in a blues jam with Les Paul and a lineup of prominent rock guitarists.

On April 4, 2009, at age 67, he spontaneously took the stage at a rural Tennessee roadhouse, performing "Cincinnati Jail" with an electric guitar borrowed from the house band's lead player, who wrote:

He made a couple of adjustments and then proceeded to begin OFFICIALLY TEARING THE ROOF OFF THE PLACE. He peeled the paint off the walls with my rig. His (my?) guitar was smoking. Sounded like the breathing of a very large, wild animal. His band leading skills were also awesome. Lots of pointing at people to change dynamics and cue solos. He owned the stage and had everybody doing exactly what he wanted them to do. Crowd went nuts, people were taking pics with their camera phones. People were screaming, everybody started dancing, it was great. He cut my other lead player's head clean off when they were swapping licks, [which] was pretty funny, as [my other lead player] is a big Eddie Van Halen-style flash player. Bottom line – His playing is still awesome. Tone is very much in the fingers. He made my rig absolutely come alive in ways I've never heard.

In 2010, again with a borrowed guitar, he performed "Memphis" at the final reunion of his "Memphis"-era band. There is no account of Mack performing thereafter.

In 2011, he released a handful of kitchen-table acoustic recordings via the internet. About that time, he was also reportedly working on a memoir and engaged in a songwriting collaboration with award-winning country and blues tunesmith Bobby Boyd.

In 2012, early rock guitar sensation Travis Wammack asked Mack to join him on a proposed tour to be billed as "Double Mack Attack". Mack declined, saying that he "...wasn't in good shape. He said he can't play standing up any more [and] it's hard to hold a Flying V sitting down."

Mack died from natural causes on April 21, 2016 (age 74) at Centennial Medical Center, Nashville, Tennessee. In the media, his death was overshadowed by that of rock superstar Prince, who died on the same day.

== Discography ==
=== Original studio albums ===
- 1964: The Wham of that Memphis Man!
- 1969: Glad I'm in the Band
- 1969: Whatever's Right
- 1971: The Hills of Indiana
- 1973: Dueling Banjos (with Rusty York)
- 1977: Home at Last
- 1978: Lonnie Mack with Pismo
- 1985: Strike Like Lightning
- 1986: Second Sight
- 1988: Roadhouses & Dance Halls
- 1999: South (rec. 1978)

=== Live albums ===
- 1990: Live! Attack of the Killer V (recorded December 1989)
- 1998: Live At Coco's (recorded 1983)
- 2025: Lonnie Mack Live From Louisville 1992 (recorded 1992)

=== Re-issues and compilations ===
- 1970: For Collectors Only (re-issue of The Wham of that Memphis Man with two additional tunes from 1964)

=== Session work (guitar) ===
Year	Artist	Album
1965	Freddie King	Freddie King Sings Again
1967	James Brown	James Brown Sings Raw Soul
1970	The Doors	Morrison Hotel (bass guitar)
1974	Dobie Gray	Hey, Dixie
1981	Ronnie Hawkins	Legend in His Spare Time
1986	Tim Krekel/The Sluggers	Over The Fence
1996	Wayne Perkins	Mendo Hotel
1998	Jack Holland	The Pressure's All Mine
1999	Albert Washington	Albert Washington with Lonnie Mack (rec. 1967)
2000	The Crudup Brothers	Franktown Blues
2006	The Charmaines	Gigi & The Charmaines (rec. 1962–1963)
2007	Stevie Ray Vaughan	Solos, Sessions & Encores (live version of "Oreo Cookie Blues" rec. 1985)

== Career recognition and awards ==
Year	Award or recognition
1980	Guitar World magazine rated Memphis (1963) the most significant "landmark" in the history of rock guitar.
1992	Jimmy Guterman ranked Mack's 1963 debut album No. 16 in his book, The 100 Best Rock 'n' Roll Records of All Time.
1993	Gibson Guitar Corporation issued a limited-run "Lonnie Mack Signature Edition" of "Number 7".
1998	The Cincinnati Enquirer gave Mack its Pop Music Award ("Cammy") for "Lifetime Achievement".
2001	Southeastern Indiana Musician's Association Hall of Fame induction.
2001	International Guitar Hall of Fame induction.
2002	Mack's second "Lifetime Achievement" Cammy.
2005	Rockabilly Hall of Fame induction.
2006	The Southern Legends Entertainment & Performing Arts Hall of Fame induction.
2010	Dave Hunter featured "Number 7" in his book, Star Guitars: 101 Guitars That Rocked The World
2011	Walter Carter featured "Number 7" in his book, The Guitar Collection, calling it one of the world's 150 "most elite guitars".
2012	Rolling Stone featured "Number 7" in an article entitled 20 Iconic Guitars.

== Further reading and listening ==
- Interviews and commentaries
1. Guralnick, "Lonnie Mack: Funky Country Living", 2020.
2. McNutt, "McGonigal, Ohio: Lonnie on the Move", 2002.
3. Interview by John Broughton on Australian radio, 2000.
4. McDevitt, "Unsung Guitar Hero Lonnie Mack", Gibson Lifestyle on-line, 2007
5. Smith, "The Guitar Player's Guitar Player: Gritz Speaks With Guitar Hero Lonnie Mack", June 2000
6. Nager, "Guitar Greatness", Cincinnati Enquirer (Cincinnati.com), March 13, 1998
7. Schaber, "Mule Train", Cincinnati Magazine, October 2000 issue, pp. 74–83
- Guitar and gear
1. O'Hara, "Lonnie Mack's Flying V", The Unique Guitar Blog, December 23, 2009
2. Forte, "Lonnie Mack: That Memphis Man is Back", 1978, p. 20, as quoted in Guitar Player staff, "We Lost Another Guitar Hero", Guitar Player magazine on-line, April 21, 2016
3. Fjestadt & Meiners, "Lonnie Mack's Bigsby-Enhanced Korina Flying V", 2007.
4. House, "Celebrity-Owned Flying V", Reverb.com, 2017.
- Documentaries
1. "Blues-rock Virtuoso Lonnie Mack Rambles On", with Ed Ward, NPR radio, July 31, 2008
2. "Lonnie Mack Special" with Lee Hay, WVXU Radio (Cincinnati), April 25, 2016
3. "Lonnie Mack", two-hour documentary, Dr Boogie radio show on Classic 21 radio (Belgium, en Francais), April 2016.
- Posthumous editorials, tributes, and reviews
1. New York Times: Grimes, "Lonnie Mack, Singer and Guitarist Who Pioneered Blues-Rock, Dies At 74", New York Times on-line, April 22, 2018
2. Washington Post: McArdle, "Lonnie Mack, guitarist and singer who influenced blues and rock acts, dies at 74", Washington Post on-line, April 25, 2016
3. Houston Chronicle: Dansby, "Music and Death 2016", Houston Chronicle on-line, December 29, 2016
4. Rolling Stone: Kreps, "Lonnie Mack, Blues-Rock Guitar Great, Dead at 74", Rolling Stone online, April 23, 2016
5. Guitar World: "Pioneering Guitarist Lonnie Mack Dead at 74", Guitar World on-line, April 22, 2016
6. Downbeat: Reed, "Blues Guitarist Lonnie Mack Dies at 74", Downbeat on-line, April 22, 2016.
7. American Blues Scene: Kerzner, "Breaking: Pioneering Guitarist Lonnie Mack Dead at 74", April 22, 2016
8. Keeping The Blues Alive: Hagood, "Lonnie Mack: Remembering His Trailblazing Blues-Rock Guitar Virtuosity", Keeping the Blues Alive, April 29, 2016
9. Toppermost: Stephens, "Lonnie Mack", TopperMost on-line, April 2016.
