= The Charmaines =

American vocal trio

- Also known as: Gigi and the Charmaines
- Origin: Cincinnati, Ohio, United States
- Genres: Rhythm and blues, soul, pop
- Years active: 1960–1974
- Labels: Fraternity Records, King, Columbia Records; Ace Records
- Past members: Gigi Jackson; Irene Vinegar; Dee Watkins; Jerri Jackson

The Charmaines were an American female vocal trio of the 1960s, described by the NME as sassy as The Supremes and The Marvelettes.

== Personnel ==
Supported by Irene Vinegar and Dee Watkins, the group's lead singer and sometime lyricist was Gigi Jackson. Born Marian Jackson, later known as Gigi Griffin, after marrying her producer Herman Griffin, Jackson started her career in a family band called the Jackson Sisters. On specific recordings, Watkins was replaced by Gigi's sister, Jerri Jackson, who later recorded in her own right.

Irene Vinegar died on June 20, 2021, at the age of 80. Gigi Jackson died on August 2, 2024, at the age of 83.

== Career ==
The Charmaines were considered Cincinnati's leading female R&B trio in the early 1960s, notably as a backing unit for many better-known artists on the King label, including Conway Twitty, James Brown, Hawkshaw Hawkins, Little Willie John, Bobby Freeman, and Gary U.S. Bonds As a group in their own right, The Charmaines' first single was Rockin’ Old Man (late 1960) with lyrics by Jackson and backed with If You Were Mine. The nearest they came to a hit was #117 on the Billboard chart in 1961 with What Kind Of Girl (Do You Think I Am), which out-sold a rival version of the same song by Erma Franklin.

It was in the time left over at the end of one of their King recording sessions that fellow Fraternity artist Lonnie Mack got the opportunity to record his first improvised hit Memphis. The Charmaines went on to appear on Lonnie Mack's best-known album Wham of That Memphis Man and recordings of comedian-singer Jack Larson. They would also record for Columbia and other labels - including two Canadian labels, Red Leaf ("Hypnotized" / "The One For Me") and RCA Canada (backing Lynda Layne on "I'm Your Pussycat") - when they were based out of Toronto ca. 1965.

== Rediscovery ==
In 2006, a 28-track compilation of the trio's 1960s recordings was issued on Ace Records and described by Record Collector as a delight for Northern fans and all-girl group collectors. In 2012, NME celebrated The Charmaines as one of the unfairly forgotten girl groups of the 1960s. On the death of Lonnie Mack in April 2016, The Charmaines were one of the groups featured in a Lonnie Mack special on Classic 21's radio show Dr Boogie
