= FitzGerald's American Music Festival =

Chicago-based annual event

FitzGerald's American Music Festival is an annual festival which takes place just west of Chicago in Berwyn, Illinois. In 2013, it is a 4-day festival over the July 4 holiday. The festival focuses on roots music, and presents performers from around the United States.

== History ==
FitzGerald's American Music Festival began in 1981 as a weekend event, organized by the operators of the Fitzgerald Night Club, with an appearance by Stevie Ray Vaughan. The first year there were four bands.

In 1997 the festival, by then stretching over four days, featured Neal Coty and the Hackberry Ramblers.

In 2011 the Friday evening entertainment included Cathy Richardson and Michelle Malone.

In 2013 the festival featured more than 40 artists on three stages. Performers included Dave Alvin, NRBQ, Marcia Ball, Brave Combo, James McMurtry, Bottle Rockets, Jon Dee Graham, Pat McLaughlin, Jimmy LaFave — plus up-and-coming artists like St. Paul & the Broken Bones, Warren Hood Band, Luke Winslow King, Sarah & the Tall Boys, Luella & the Sun and Lost and Nameless Orchestra. And from around the Chicago music scene — Dolly Varden, Girl Group Chicago, The Westies, Cathy Richardson Band, The Blisters, Expo '76 and Tributosaurus. The festival also included a Paladins reunion and some Tex-Mex fun with Mac Baca & Los TexManiacs.

The 2014 festival included a performance by Chuck Mead & His Grassy Knoll Boys, and in 2016 the singer/songwriter Jon Dee Graham took part.

== T-shirts ==
Each year a T-shirt with a newly created design is available to attendees at the festival. The designs are created by local artists.
