= Cathy Carr (singer) =

- Promotional photograph of Cathy Carr, 1956

Background information
- Born: Angelina Helen Catherine Cordovano; June 28, 1936; The Bronx, New York, U.S.
- Died: November 22, 1988 (aged 52) Fayetteville, New York, U.S.
- Genres: Traditional pop
- Years active: 1953–1966
- Labels: Coral, Fraternity, Roulette, London, Smash, Laurie, RCA, Dot
- Website: Biography

Angelina Helen Catherine Cordovano (June 28, 1936 – November 22, 1988), known professionally as Cathy Carr, was an American pop singer.

== Career ==
She was born in The Bronx. As a child, she appeared on The Children's Hour, a television show locally aired in New York; sponsored by Horn & Hardart, a cafeteria chain which had locations in New York and Philadelphia. She later became a singer and dancer with the USO and joined big band orchestras such as those of Sammy Kaye and Johnny Dee.

In 1953 she signed with Coral Records, but had no hits for them, later switching to Fraternity Records, a small company based in Cincinnati, Ohio, in early 1955. It was for Fraternity that she had her only major hit, "Ivory Tower", which was her third record for Fraternity.

She never had another big hit, though in 1959 she had two small successes for Roulette Records. She recorded one single for Smash Records in 1961, which was a more mature song, but went back to recording teenage pop on Laurie Records in 1962. She moved to RCA to record a number of albums of standards, before Laurie released her final single in 1967. Her first LP was reissued on Dot Records in 1966.

At the time of her 1956 hit, she recorded a lot of high school pop, not moving on to more mature songs and standards until her pop career was all but over. The CD age saw an unofficial release of selected singles, which showed her preference to seem younger than she was and did not include her attempts at more mature songs.

== Death ==
Carr died from ovarian cancer on November 22, 1988, in Fayetteville, New York.

== Albums ==
Date of Release	Title	Label	Cat. No	Notes
February 1957	Ivory Tower	Fraternity	F-1005	
1959	Shy	Roulette	SR-25077	
1964	Songs for Sentimentalists	RCA Canada	LPM-2913 (mono); LSP-2913(Stereo)	
1966	Travel by Carr	RCA Canada	PC-1050 (mono); PCS-1050 (Stereo)	
1966	Ivory Tower	Dot	DLP-3674 (mono); DLP-25674 (Stereo)	Reissue of LP on Fraternity; Stereo Version is Rechanelled

== Singles ==
Date of Release	Title	Label	Cat. No	Notes
1953	Half Pint Boogie c/w Heartbroken	Coral	60907	
1953	Somebody Told You A Lie c/w I Just Can't Get That Melody Out Of My Mind	Coral	60988	
1953	I'll Cry At Your Wedding c/w Cryin' for the Carolines	Coral	61092	
1955	I Never Really Stopped Loving You c/w Warm Your Heart	Fraternity	F-712	
1955	Morning, Noon and Night c/w Towards Evenin'	Fraternity	F-718	
1956	Ivory Tower c/w Please, Please Believe Me	Fraternity	F-734	
1956	I'll Cry At Your Wedding c/w Heartbroken	Coral	9-61646	Presumably released by Coral to capitalise on the popularity of Ivory Tower
1956	Heart Hideaway c/w The Boy On Page 35	Fraternity	F-743	
1956	Oh Baby c/w Waltzing To The Blues	Fraternity	F-750	
1957	Una Momento c/w It Looks Like Love	Fraternity	F-757	
1957	Wild Honey c/w Speak For Yourself, John	Fraternity	F-765	
1957	House of Heartaches c/w Presents From The Past	Fraternity	F-782	
1958	Doll Baby c/w Don't Come To My Party	Fraternity	F-793	
1958	To Know Him Is To Love Him c/w Put Away The Invitation	Roulette	R-4107	
1959	First Anniversary c/w With Love	Roulette	R-4125	
1959	I'm Gonna Change Him c/w The Little Things You Do	Roulette	R-4152	
1959	Shy c/w Personal Secret	Roulette	R-4187	
1960	Little Sister c/w Dark River	Roulette	R-4219	
1960	A Little Time c/w What Do I Do Now	Roulette	R-4248	
1960	I Want To Be Your Pet c/w Golden Locket	Roulette	R-4296	
1961	Johnny's Song c/w Someone Told You A Lie	Roulette	R-4323	
1961	Yearning c/w Baseball He Loves	Roulette	R-4367	
1961	I Can't Begin To Tell You c/w You're Breaking My Heart	Roulette	R-4383	
1961	Footprints In The Snow c/w Nein Nein Fraulein	Smash	S-1726	
1962	Ivory Tower c/w Should I Believe Him	Laurie	LR-3133	Ivory Tower is a new recording
1962	Sailor Boy c/w Next Time The Band Plays A Waltz	Laurie	LR-3147	
1963	I Waded In The Water c/w In Place Of You	Laurie	LR-3161	
1963	My Favourite Song c/w The Ghost Of A Broken Heart	Laurie	LR-3206	
1967	When You Come Home Again c/w The Ghost Of A Broken Heart	Laurie	LR-3378	

== Sources ==
- Biography on the Iceberg.com site
- Discographical information from Global Dog Productions
