= Whatever's Right =

Studio album by Lonnie Mack
- Released: 1969
- Label: Elektra
- Producer: Russ Miller

Lonnie Mack chronology
Glad I'm in the Band (1969)	Whatever's Right (1969)	The Hills of Indiana (1971)

Professional ratings
Review scores
Source	Rating
AllMusic	2.5/5 stars
Rolling Stone (original)	(favorable)

Whatever's Right was a 1969 album by Lonnie Mack.

== Track listing ==
1. "Untouched by Human Love" (Norman Simon, Dick Roman) 3:40
2. "I Found a Love" (Wilson Pickett, Willie Schofield, Robert West) 3:34
3. "Share Your Love With Me" (Deadric Malone, Alfred Braggs) 4:12
4. "Teardrops on Your Letter" (S. Scott) 4:14
5. "Baby What You Want Me to Do" (Jimmy Reed) 2:53
6. "Mt. Healthy Blues" [instrumental] (Mack) 6:50
7. "What Kind of World Is This?" (Troy Seals) 4:05
8. "My Babe" (Willie Dixon) 2:36
9. "Things Have Gone to Pieces" (Leon Payne) 2:55
10. "Gotta Be an Answer" (Mack) 2:43

== Personnel ==
- Lonnie Mack - guitar, vocals, 6-string bass
- Rusty York - harmonica
- Bruce Botnick - engineer
- Jack Brickles - harmonica
- David Byrd - keyboards
- Roy Christiansen - cello
- Tim Drummond - bass
- Ron Grayson - drums
- Timothy Hedding - organ
- Jac Holzman - production co-ordination
- Jerry Love - drums
- Denzil "Dumpy" Rice - piano
- Leslie Asch, E. Brenden Harkin - horn arrangements
- Sherlie Matthews - vocals

== Earlier recording ==
"Untouched By Human Love" was originally released in 1963, by the soul/jazz singer Azie Mortimer on the Troy Records label.
