= Ivory Tower (1956 song) =

Single by Gale Storm

from the album Gale's Great Hits
- B-side: "I Ain't Gonna Worry"
- Released: March 1956
- Recorded: 1955
- Genre: Traditional pop
- Length: 2:41
- Label: Dot
- Songwriter(s): Jack Fulton, Lois Steele

Gale Storm singles chronology
"Why Do Fools Fall In Love" (1956)	"Ivory Tower" (1956)	"Tell Me Why" (1956)

"Ivory Tower" is a popular song written by Jack Fulton and Lois Steele. Popular versions by Cathy Carr and Gale Storm, and a rhythm & blues version by Otis Williams all received major popularity in 1956.

"Ivory Tower"

Single by Cathy Carr

from the album Ivory Tower
- B-side: "Please, Please Believe Me"
- Released: March 1956
- Recorded: 1955
- Genre: Traditional pop
- Length: 2:29
- Label: Fraternity
- Songwriter(s): Jack Fulton, Lois Steele

Cathy Carr singles chronology
"Morning, Noon and Night" (1955)	"Ivory Tower" (1956)	"I'll Cry At Your Wedding" (1956)

"Ivory Tower"

Single by Otis Williams and the Charms
- B-side: "In Paradise"
- Released: March 1956
- Recorded: 1955
- Genre: R&B
- Length: 2:15
- Label: DeLuxe
- Songwriter(s): Jack Fulton, Lois Steele

Otis Williams and the Charms singles chronology
"That's Your Mistake" (1956)	"Ivory Tower" (1956)	"United" (1957)

== Recorded versions ==
- Cathy Carr (1956) went to number 2 on the Top 100. Overseas, her version achieved number 2 on the Australian chart.
- Hank Locklin
- Gale Storm (1956) went to number 6 on the Billboard pop charts
- Porter Wagoner
- Otis Williams and the Charms (1956) reached number 5 on Billboard's R&B chart and number 11 on the pop chart.
- Connie Francis
- Compare a song recorded by Eileen Rodgers in 1956 called "Unwanted Heart", written by Ray Conniff, and released on 4 June, as Columbia catalogue 40708, which is uncannily similar.
