= The Hills of Indiana =

Studio album by Lonnie Mack
- Released: 1971
- Genre: Country rock; roots rock
- Label: Elektra
- Producer: Lonnie Mack, Russ Miller

Lonnie Mack chronology
Whatever's Right' (1969)	The Hills of Indiana (1971)	Dueling Banjos (1973)

Professional ratings
Review scores
Source	Rating
Allmusic	3.5/5 stars

The Hills of Indiana is a 1971 album by Lonnie Mack. The album marked a divergence from Mack's previous recordings by focusing on country rock and roots rock instead of blues rock and rhythm and blues.

== Track listing ==
1. "Asphalt Outlaw Hero" (Don Nix) 3:04
2. "Florida" (Don Nix) 3:08
3. "Lay It Down" (Gene Thomas) 3:51
4. "The Hills of Indiana" (Mack) 3:42
5. "Uncle Pen" (Bill Monroe) 1:51
6. "Bicycle Annie" 5:09
7. "A Fine Way to Go" (Carole King) 3:07
8. "Rings" (Eddie Reeves, Alex Harvey) 3:12
9. "The Man in Me" (Bob Dylan) 3:08
10. "She Even Woke Me Up to Say Goodbye" (Mickey Newbury, Doug Gilmore) 3:19
11. "All Good Things Will Come to Pass" (Don Nix) 3:27
12. "Three Angels" (Don Nix) 4:31

== Personnel ==
- Lonnie Mack - guitar, vocals
- Buddy Spicher - fiddle
- David Briggs - keyboards
- Lloyd Green - steel guitar
- Don Nix - baritone saxophone, vocals on "Three Angels"
- Troy Seals - bass, vocals
- Barry Beckett - keyboards
- Kenny Buttrey - drums
- Tim Drummond - bass guitar
- Roger Hawkins - drums
- David Hood - bass guitar
- Mount Zion Singers - vocals
- Wayne Perkins - guitar
- Norbert Putnam - bass, horn and string arrangements
