= Songs for Sentimentalists =

Studio album by Cathy Carr
- Released: 1964
- Genre: Traditional pop
- Length: 30:22
- Label: RCA Victor
- Producer: W. A. Gillmeister and Marcel LeBlanc

Cathy Carr chronology
Shy (1959)	Songs for Sentimentalists (1964)	Travel by Carr (1965)

Songs for Sentimentalists is an album released by Cathy Carr on the RCA Victor label in 1964.

It marks the end of Carr's attempts to revive her commercial pop career; instead, she opted for an album of standards from the early 20th century.

== Track listing ==
Side 1:

1. "Let Me Call You Sweetheart" (Leo Friedman - Beth Slater Whitson) – 2:14
2. "When I Lost You" (Irving Berlin) – 2:33
3. "Show Me the Way to Go Home" (James Campbell - Reginald Connelly) – 2:02
4. "All by Myself" (Irving Berlin) – 2:23
5. "My Melancholy Baby" (Ernie Burnett - George A. Norton) – 3:05
6. "I'm Always Chasing Rainbows" (Harry Carroll - Joseph McCarthy) – 1:45

Side 2:

1. "Me and My Shadow" (Al Jolson - Billy Rose - Dave Dreyer) – 2:20
2. "After You've Gone" (Turner Layton - Henry Creamer) – 2:15
3. "Embraceable You" (George Gershwin - Ira Gershwin) – 2:31
4. "It Had to Be You" (Isham Jones - Gus Kahn) – 2:42
5. "One for My Baby" (Harold Arlen - Johnny Mercer) – 3:05
6. "I'll See You in My Dreams" (Isham Jones - Gus Kahn) – 2:44
