= Roadhouses & Dance Halls =

Studio album by Lonnie Mack
- Released: 1988
- Studio: Muscle Shoals
- Genre: Rock, country, blues
- Label: Epic
- Producer: Barry Beckett, Lonnie Mack

Lonnie Mack chronology
Second Sight (1986)	Roadhouses & Dance Halls (1988)	Live! Attack of the Killer V (1990)

Roadhouses & Dance Halls is an album by the American musician Lonnie Mack, released in 1988. He supported the album with a North American tour. The first single was "Too Rock for Country, Too Country for Rock and Roll". Roadhouses & Dance Halls was a commercial failure, and Mack was subsequently dropped by Epic Records.

== Production ==
The album was coproduced by Barry Beckett. Mack was backed by some of the Muscle Shoals session musicians. He wanted the album to incorporate more country music influences; he also focused more on a band sound rather than songs that merely showcased his guitar solos. Mack played a 1958 Gibson Flying V. "50's/60's Man" acknowledges that Mack's musical style was formed in the late 1950s and early 1960s. "Hard Life", on which David Lindley played slide guitar, is about an older musician navigating the touring lifestyle and music industry. "Cocaine Blues" is a cover of the murder ballad; Mack was unsure of the songwriter of the version on which he based his take. "High Blood Pressure" was originally performed by Huey Smith. "Sexy Ways" and "Annie Had a Baby" are covers of the Hank Ballard songs.

== Critical reception ==
Professional ratings
Review scores
Source	Rating
AllMusic	2/5 stars
The Cincinnati Post	4/5 stars
The Philadelphia Inquirer	3.5/4 stars
The Rolling Stone Album Guide	2.5/5 stars
The Virgin Encyclopedia of the Blues	3/5 stars

The Toronto Star stated that "Mack still delivers with an up-the-gut intensity that gives this straight-driving set an almost-live feel." The Chicago Tribune said that the "unrepentant rock romantic and guitar hero [cranks] out more no-frills boogie, blues and country funk on his first major label release in some time." The Cincinnati Post praised Mack's "whiskey-soaked vocals". The Arizona Daily Star noted that "Mack's honky-tonk spirit and greasy, unrefined style remain intact." The Boston Globe labeled Mack "one of a kind in an industry full of imitators". The Buffalo News opined, "For all his road wisdom, Mack is as fresh as a man just starting out."

In 2001, The Philadelphia Inquirer called the album "a splendid showcase for his tough but soulful roadhouse style."

== Track listing ==
No.	Title	Length
1.	"Too Rock for Country, Too Country for Rock and Roll"
2.	"50's/60's Man"
3.	"Lucille"
4.	"Medley: Sexy Ways/Annie Had a Baby"
5.	"Plain Jane (In a Mustang)"
6.	"Honky Tonk Man"
7.	"Riding the Blinds"
8.	"High Blood Pressure"
9.	"Cocaine Blues"
10.	"Hard Life"
