= Jewel Records (Cincinnati record label) =

Jewel Records was a record label which discs were pressed by the Scranton Button Company. Jewel is one of the big three record companies out of Cincinnati, Ohio. The two most famous, King Records and Fraternity Records, were responsible for several hits over the years from a wide range of genres. Two prominent figures who recorded for Jewel were Lonnie Mack, who did two singles for the label in 1970, and Albert Washington.

== See also ==
- List of record labels
