= Glad I'm in the Band =

Studio album by Lonnie Mack
- Released: 1969
- Label: Elektra
- Producer: Russ Miller

Lonnie Mack chronology
The Wham of that Memphis Man (1964)	Glad I'm in the Band (1969)	Whatever's Right (1969)

Professional ratings
Review scores
Source	Rating
AllMusic	3/5 stars
Rolling Stone	(positive)

Glad I'm in the Band is a 1969 album by the American guitarist Lonnie Mack. It is his second studio album, succeeding his debut, The Wham of that Memphis Man, from 1963. The album included two re-recorded tracks from Wham. “Why”, and the instrumental cover of Chuck Berry's "Memphis."

== Track listing ==
All tracks composed by Lonnie Mack, except where indicated.

1. "Why" 4:20
2. "Save Your Money" 2:48
3. "Old House" (H.Bynum-G.Jones) 3.05
4. "Too Much Trouble" (Drummond-Keith-Stokes) 2:02
5. "In the Band" (L.Mack-B.Salyer) 1:42
6. "Let Them Talk" (Sonny Thompson) 4:15
7. "Memphis" (Chuck Berry) 2:28
8. "Sweat and Tears" (David Byrd) 4:14
9. "Roberta" (Al Smith, John Vincent) 2:20
10. "Stay Away from My Baby" (Ray Pennington) 3:45
11. "She Don't Come Here Anymore" (Mack, Wayne Bullock) 4:24

== Personnel ==
- Lonnie Mack – guitar, vocals
- Bruce Botnick – engineer
- David Byrd – bass, keyboards, voices
- Tim Drummond – bass
- Jac Holzman – production supervisor
- Maxwell Davis – horn arrangements
- Mac Elsensohn – drums
- Sebastian Dangerfield – voices
- Billy Salyer – drums
