= FitzGerald's Nightclub =

Historic music club in Chicago, Illinois

- FitzGerald's
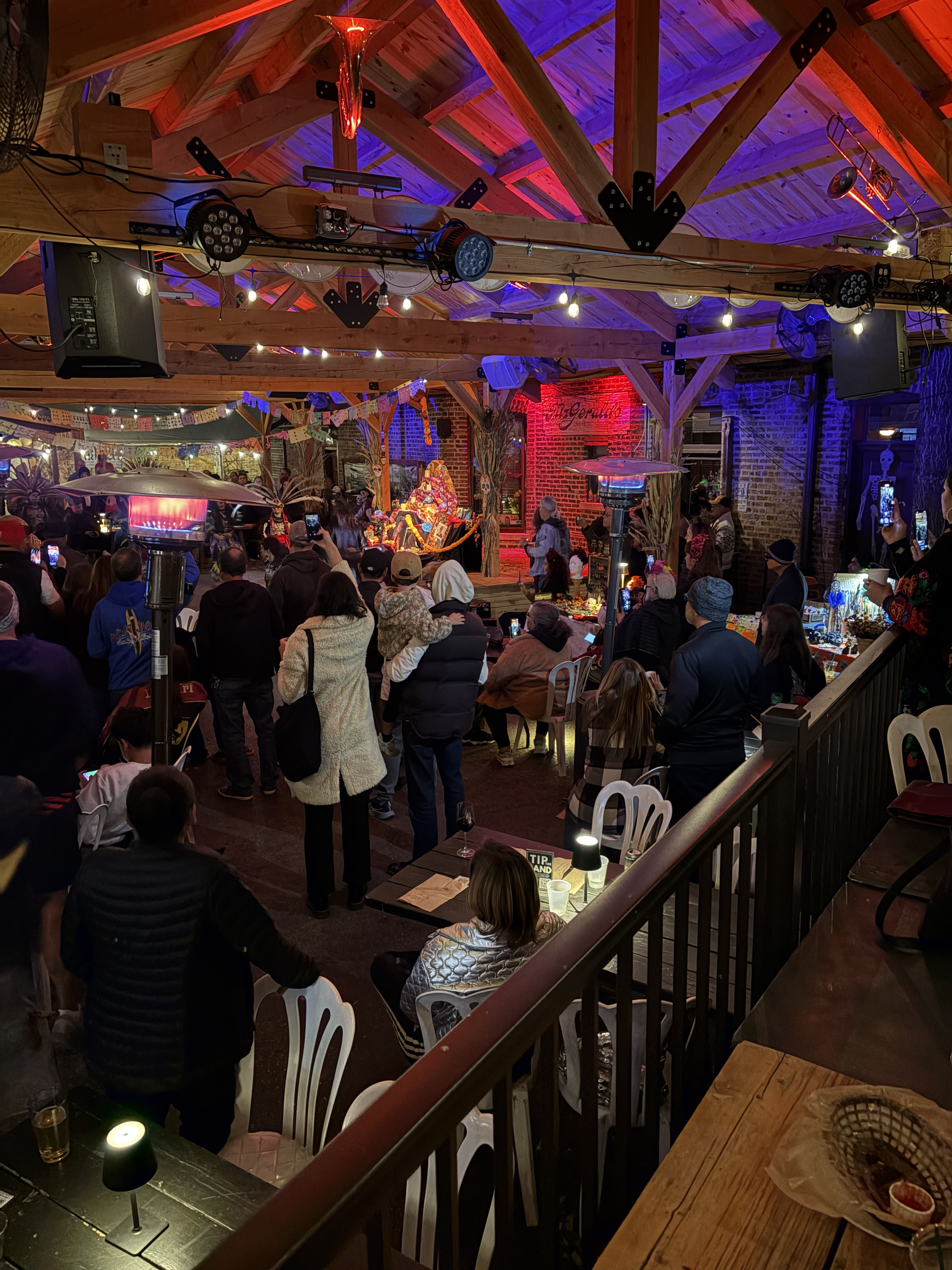
- Pavilion at Fitzgerald's Nightclub, 2025

- Location within Chicago metropolitan area
- Former names: Oakwyn Athletic Club (1920–1933); Club Ritz (1933–1934); Club Whitehall (1934–1944); Ranucci's Night Spot (1944–1948); The Hunt Club (1948–1962); Deer Lodge (1962–1980)
- Address: 6615 Roosevelt Rd
- Location: Berwyn, Illinois
- Coordinates: 41°51.912′N 87°47.382′W
- Owner: Will Duncan and Jess King
- Type: Live music venue, nightclub, historic roadhouse

Construction
- Opened: 1980

Website
- www.fitzgeraldsnightclub.com

FitzGerald's Nightclub is a historic American roots music club and tavern in Berwyn, Illinois, a western suburb of Chicago. Known for its distinct, rustic Northwoods aesthetic, the location became the first music venue or nightclub in Illinois to be listed on the National Register of Historic Places in 2025, a designation recognizing its cultural and community significance over more than a century.

The club is best known for its annual FitzGerald's American Music Festival (AMF), which is held every Fourth of July weekend.

== Layout and facilities ==
The venue known as FitzGerald's Nightclub is located at 6615 W. Roosevelt Road in Berwyn, Illinois, and has expanded over time into a multi-building live-music campus that spans several adjacent properties. The complex is divided into distinct performance and dining spaces that connect via a central courtyard.

- FitzGerald's Nightclub (Main Room): This is the primary venue, featuring a bar and the main stage. According to venue listings, its standing capacity is up to 400 people in one configuration.
- Babygold BBQ: The in-house American barbecue restaurant is attached to the Nightclub. It provides a full-service menu—known for its traditional 'cue and Cajun-influenced dishes—for the entire facility, including the Nightclub, Sidebar, courtyard, and private dining spaces.
- The Sidebar: An adjacent building that functions as a neighborhood cocktail lounge and offers a more intimate performance venue with its own stage and bar.
- The Pavilion: A central patio area connecting the buildings features an exterior bar and a permanent, open-sided Pavilion structure, constructed in 2025, which includes an additional stage for outdoor performances.

== History ==
The building's history spans over a century, beginning as early as 1911. From 1911 to 1917, it was zoned as a dance hall.

During the Prohibition era, the venue briefly operated as an "athletic club". Following the repeal of Prohibition, it became Club Ritz, which was known to be a hangout for members of Al Capone's gang, including Jack "Machine Gun" McGurn. In 1934, the Berwyn Mayor shut down Club Ritz due to its ties to the crime syndicate. It was subsequently reopened under "reputable" management.

As the United States reeled from the Great Depression, Club Whitehall (1934–1944) followed big band music and swing music trends.

Ranucci's Night Spot (1944–1948), was known as a restaurant and night spot during this period.

In the 1950s and 60s, operating as The Hunt Club, it hosted early jazz legends such as trombonist Turk Murphy and pianist Lil Hardin Armstrong.

Deer Lodge (1962–1980) featured pool tables and a fortune teller. The Salty Dogs jazz ensemble performed here and were later featured at the inaugural American Music Festival in 1982.

The FitzGerald family, led by Bill, Chris, and their father Chris Sr., purchased the building on Roosevelt Road in March 1980. They transformed the former Deer Lodge into FitzGerald's Nightclub, establishing its long-standing focus on roots, blues, jazz, and Americana music, and launched the AMF the following year.

Current ownership (2020–Present): Will Duncan and Jess King purchased the venue from the retiring FitzGerald family in March 2020, just days before the COVID-19 pandemic shutdown.

King successfully led the application that resulted in the nightclub being listed on the National Register of Historic Places in 2025, a designation recognizing the building's cultural and community significance.

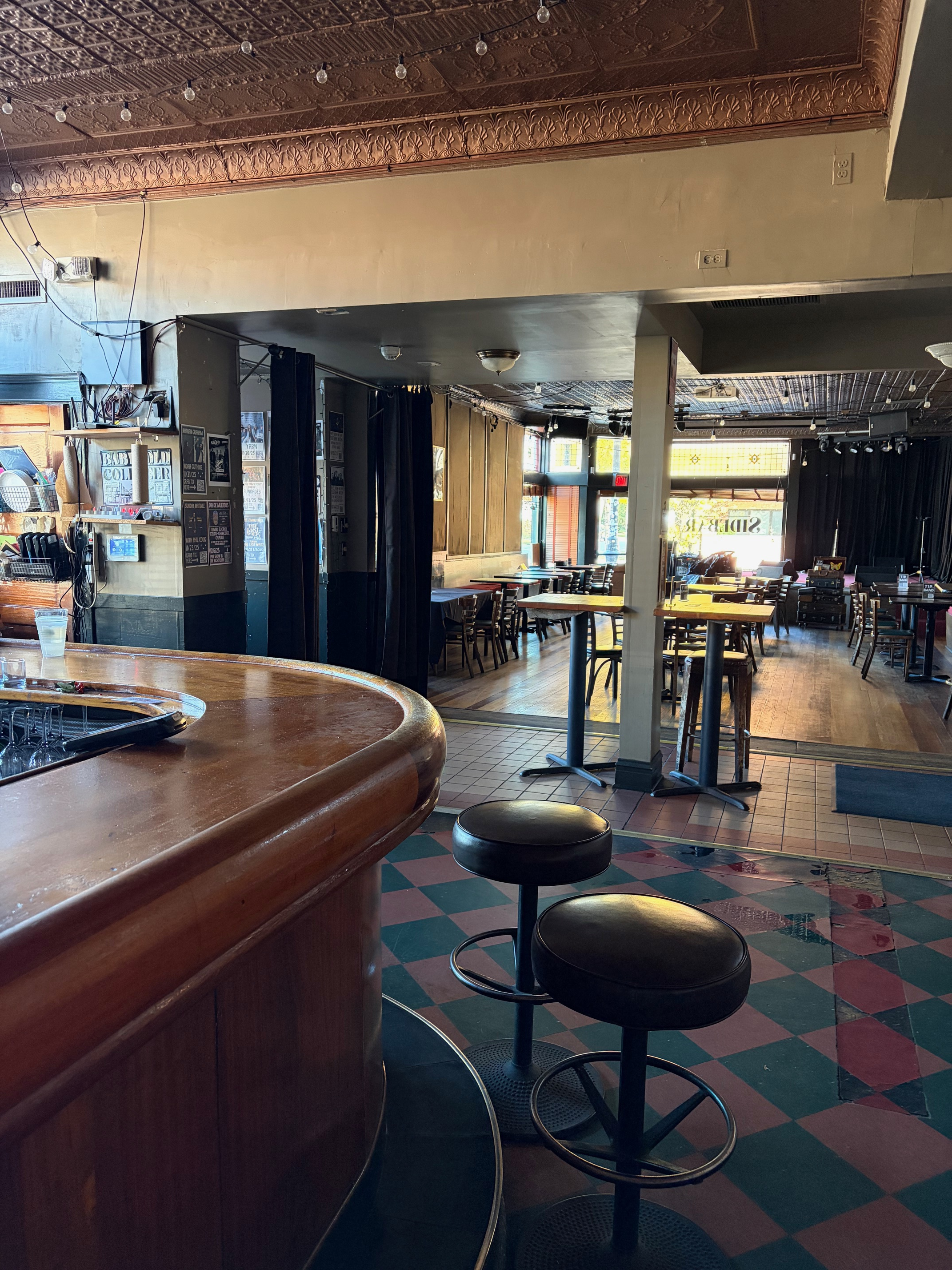
Sidebar at Fitzgerald's Nightclub

== Notable performers and musical focus ==
FitzGerald's is distinguished by its deep affinity for Louisiana and Texas roots music, a genre focus established early by the FitzGerald family. This commitment to regional sounds has attracted both music legends and rising stars.

=== Americana / Roots ===
The club serves as a pillar for acclaimed American roots songwriters and Americana acts. The venue has hosted frequent performances by legendary artists such as Steve Earle and James McMurtry. Notable performances also include Lucinda Williams (who performed two sets celebrating the 20th anniversary of her seminal album, Car Wheels on a Gravel Road), and the English songwriter Nick Lowe. The club has also welcomed Alejandro Escovedo, Joe Ely, and Charlie Parr.

=== Louisiana and Texas roots music ===
The club is credited with introducing Zydeco music to many Chicago audiences, hosting the genre's founder, Clifton Chenier, in the early 1980s. This Louisiana legacy is carried on by his son, C.J. Chenier & The Red Hot Louisiana Band, who frequently headline the American Music Festival. The commitment to the boogie-woogie sound began when the club booked Marcia Ball as its first national touring act in 1981. Contemporary New Orleans heavyweight Trombone Shorty, guitarist Sonny Landreth, and the famed Preservation Hall Jazz Band have all performed at the venue. Early in his career, Texas blues-rock legend Stevie Ray Vaughan performed at the club's inaugural 4th of July event in 1981.

=== Blues, soul and gospel ===
The venue serves as an important location in the history of blues recordings. The late blues great Koko Taylor recorded her only live album, "Live From Chicago – An Audience With The Queen", on the Berwyn stage over three nights in January 1987. The club has also hosted soul and gospel legends such as Otis Clay and Mavis Staples, as well as blues/soul vocalist Shemekia Copeland.

=== Rock ===
The club hosts diverse rock and world music acts, including the Mexican-American rock band Los Lobos, and rock bands like The Wallflowers and The Blasters (featuring Dave Alvin). The venue has also been a filming location for major pop artists; the music video for the Bon Jovi single "Lost Highway" was shot largely at FitzGerald's in July 2007. A notable 1997 performance by Steve Earle (just after the release of his album El Corazon) was preserved in the WXRT Archives and later broadcast in 2020 as part of the radio station's "Live From The XRT Archives" series.

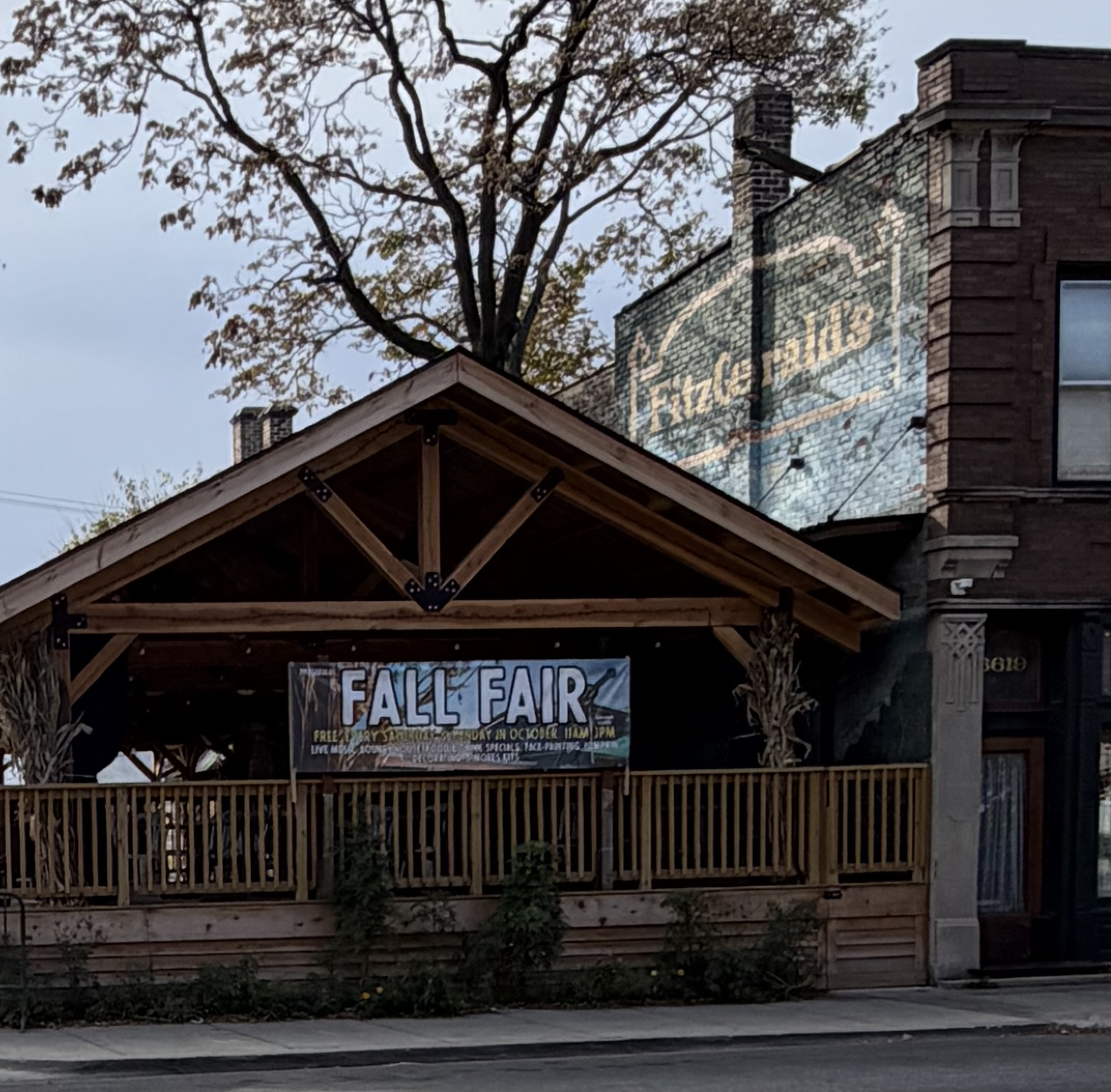
Fitgerald's Nightclub exterior

== Recurring events ==
The nightclub hosts several long-standing weekly and annual events that underscore its focus on community and roots music genres:

American Music Festival (AMF): The club's signature event is an annual, multi-day music festival held every Fourth of July weekend. Founded in 1981, it is noted as one of the longest-running roots music festivals in the United States.

Tuesday Bluesday: A popular, monthly live blues concert series held in partnership with WDCB 90.9 FM. The series was established with WDCB host Tom Marker, who gained prominence as a longtime champion of Chicago blues and hosted the concerts from 2015.

Mardi Gras Celebration: An annual event celebrating the club's "special love for music from Texas and Louisiana," often featuring Zydeco, New Orleans brass, and blues acts.

"It's a Wonderful Life" Viewing Party: A seasonal tradition where the SideBar is transformed into "Nick's", the fictional rough-and-tumble bar from the film. The event, held in December, features the film screening, an antique cash register, and a custom menu of cocktails inspired by the movie, such as the "Flaming Rum Punch" and "Zu-Zu's Petals."

The "Golden Ticket" concert is an annual, mystery-themed event designed to inject a sense of surprise and anticipation for attendees by offering a show with unannounced acts.

== Cultural references ==
FitzGerald's is also known for its classic, rustic Northwoods aesthetic, which has attracted filmmakers. The venue has been used as a filming location for several major motion pictures, including The Color of Money (1986), starring Tom Cruise and Paul Newman, A League of Their Own (1992), starring Tom Hanks and Geena Davis, and Adventures in Babysitting (1987), starring Elisabeth Shue.
