= Strike Like Lightning =

Studio album by Lonnie Mack
- Released: 1985
- Genre: Blues; R&B
- Label: Alligator
- Producer: Stevie Ray Vaughan, Lonnie Mack

Lonnie Mack chronology
Lonnie Mack with Pismo (1977)	Strike Like Lightning (1985)	Second Sight (1986)

Strike Like Lightning is an album by the American musician Lonnie Mack, released in 1985. The working title was Return of the Flying V, after Mack's 1958 Gibson Flying V. Regarded as a comeback album, Strike Like Lightning was a commercial success.

== Production ==
Recorded in Austin, Texas, the album was coproduced by Stevie Ray Vaughan, who also played guitar on some of the songs. The recording sessions were delayed while Mack recovered from health issues. Tim Drummond played bass on the album; Stan Szelest played keyboards. "Double Whammy" is a takeoff on Mack's first hit, "Wham!" Vaughan played a National steel guitar on "Oreo Cookie Blues" and sang on "If You Have to Know". "Stop" is a reworked version of Mack's "Why".

== Critical reception ==
Professional ratings
Review scores
Source	Rating
Robert Christgau	B+
The Encyclopedia of Popular Music	3/5 stars
The Rolling Stone Album Guide	3/5 stars

The Globe and Mail called the album "raw and raunchy" and "a solid reminder of why Mack is regarded as a pioneer of the electric blues-guitar style that dominated rock in the late sixties." The Kingston Whig-Standard wrote that "Mack has a whipsaw-raspy country-blues voice that any of today's rockers would kill for." The Daily Oklahoman stated that the songs "are distinguished by Mack's trademark—stinging, low-register, twangy guitar—and his raspy, born-for-the-blues vocals."

The Omaha World-Herald deemed the album "rolling rhythm and blues that avoids the cliches and pitfalls of usual guitar albums." The Dallas Morning News praised the "great playing, inventive blues songwriting, and some of the best blues vocals in a long, long time." New Orleans music magazine Wavelength wrote that Mack's guitar soloing and singing were great, but criticized Vaughan's production for "shoddy arrangements, [...] plodding drumbeats", and poor sound quality.

== Track listing ==
No.	Title	Length
1.	"Hound Dog Man"
2.	"Satisfy Susie"
3.	"Stop"
4.	"Long Way from Memphis"
5.	"Double Whammy"
6.	"Strike Like Lightning"
7.	"Falling Back in Love with You"
8.	"If You Have to Know"
9.	"You Ain't Got Me"
10.	"Oreo Cookie Blues"
