= Robert Ward (blues musician) =

American blues musician (1938–2008)

Robert June Ward, Sr.
- Born: Robert June Ward; October 15, 1938; Luthersville, Georgia, United States
- Died: December 25, 2008 (aged 70) Dry Branch, Georgia, United States
- Genres: Blues; soul
- Occupations: Musician, songwriter
- Instruments: Vocals, guitar
- Years active: 1960s–70s, 1990s–2008
- Labels: LuPine, Black Top, Delmark

Robert June Ward Sr. (October 15, 1938 – December 25, 2008) was an American blues and soul guitarist. He was known for founding the Ohio Untouchables, the band that later would become the Ohio Players. He played the guitar with a unique tone soaked in vibrato coming from a Magnatone amplifier.

== Biography ==
Born in Luthersville, Georgia, he moved to Dayton, Ohio in 1960 and formed the Ohio Untouchables. The group released several singles on LuPine including "Your Love Is Amazing" which would become one of Ward's signature songs. They also recorded the guitar workout, "Forgive Me Darling", which was loosely modelled on Bo Diddley's, "I'm Sorry". Ward left the group in 1965.

He moved to the Detroit area, actually residing in Toledo, Ohio, and released singles under his name in the late 1960s. He disappeared from the music scene in the 1970s, after working as a session player for Motown. In 1977, both his wife and mother died, and Ward relocated to Grantville, Georgia.

In the early 1990s he returned to the spotlight. He was rediscovered by Black Top Records and released his first solo album Fear No Evil in 1991. It included a re-recording of "Forgive Me Darling". He released two more albums in the next four years for the label. In the mid-1990s he did limited touring, including a date in Minneapolis with Curtis Obeda and The Butanes, and several dates in Michigan including Kalamazoo, Three Rivers and Grand Rapids. After the label went defunct in the late 1990s, WRKR Kalamazoo blues DJ Marty Spaulding, who Robert had appointed his manager, arranged a recording contract with Delmark Records to release New Role Soul in 2000. In his last years he had health problems, including two strokes, which prevented him from performing or recording.

On December 25, 2008, Ward died at his home in Dry Branch, Georgia.

== Discography ==
- 1991: Fear No Evil (Black Top)
- 1993: Rhythm of the People (Black Top)
- 1995: Hot Stuff (Relic), a collection of his early sides from the 1960s
- 1995: Black Bottom (Black Top)
- 2000: New Role Soul (Delmark)
