= Fear No Evil (Robert Ward album) =

Studio album by Robert Ward
- Released: 1991
- Genre: Blues, soul
- Label: Black Top
- Producer: Hammond Scott

Robert Ward chronology
Fear No Evil (1991)	Rhythm of the People (1993)

Fear No Evil is an album by the American musician Robert Ward, released in 1991. He is credited with his band, the Black Top All-Stars. Ward supported the album with a North American tour. Ann Peebles covered the title track on her 1992 album, Full Time Love.

== Production ==
Recorded in New Orleans, Fear No Evil was produced by Hammond Scott. Ward used a pronounced tremolo in his guitar playing. George Porter Jr. played bass on the album. Mark "Kaz" Kazanoff led the horn section. Some songs dated to Ward's Ohio Untouchables days. Ward's wife, Roberta, sang on "Strictly Reserved for You".

== Critical reception ==
Professional ratings
Review scores
Source	Rating
AllMusic	5/5 stars
Chicago Tribune	3.5/4 stars
Robert Christgau	A−
MusicHound Blues: The Essential Album Guide	5/5 stars
The Penguin Guide to Blues Recordings	4/4 stars
The Philadelphia Inquirer	3/4 stars

USA Today called Ward "an overlooked virtuoso." OffBeat considered Fear No Evil "one of the great soul discs of recent years." The Chicago Tribune wrote that it "crackles with funky, Memphis soul arrangements, gospel-blues vocals ... and, most of all, Ward's distinctive guitar playing." Robert Christgau considered Ward to be "a better-than-average writer, a hooky arranger, and a sneaky soloist you remember for the wobbly sound of his Magnatone amp alone."

The New York Times determined that "the percussive urgency of '60s soul and '70s funk ... fuels Robert Ward's superb Fear No Evil." The Commercial Appeal praised the "jovial quips" and "explosive solos." The Colorado Springs Gazette-Telegraph listed Fear No Evil among the 10 best albums of 1991.

AllMusic deemed Fear No Evil "one of the classic blues/soul albums of the '90s."

== Track listing ==
No.	Title	Length
1.	"Your Love Is Amazing"
2.	"Born to Entertain"
3.	"Forgive Me Darling"
4.	"Your Love Is Real"
5.	"Something for Nothing"
6.	"Fear No Evil"
7.	"Trying My Best (Not to Never Do Wrong)"
8.	"Strictly Reserved for You"
9.	"So Tired of Wandering"
10.	"Blessings"
11.	"Newborn Music"
12.	"K-Po-Kee"
13.	"Lord Have Mercy on Me"
14.	"Dry Spell"
