= Magnatone =

Brand of electric guitars and amplifiers

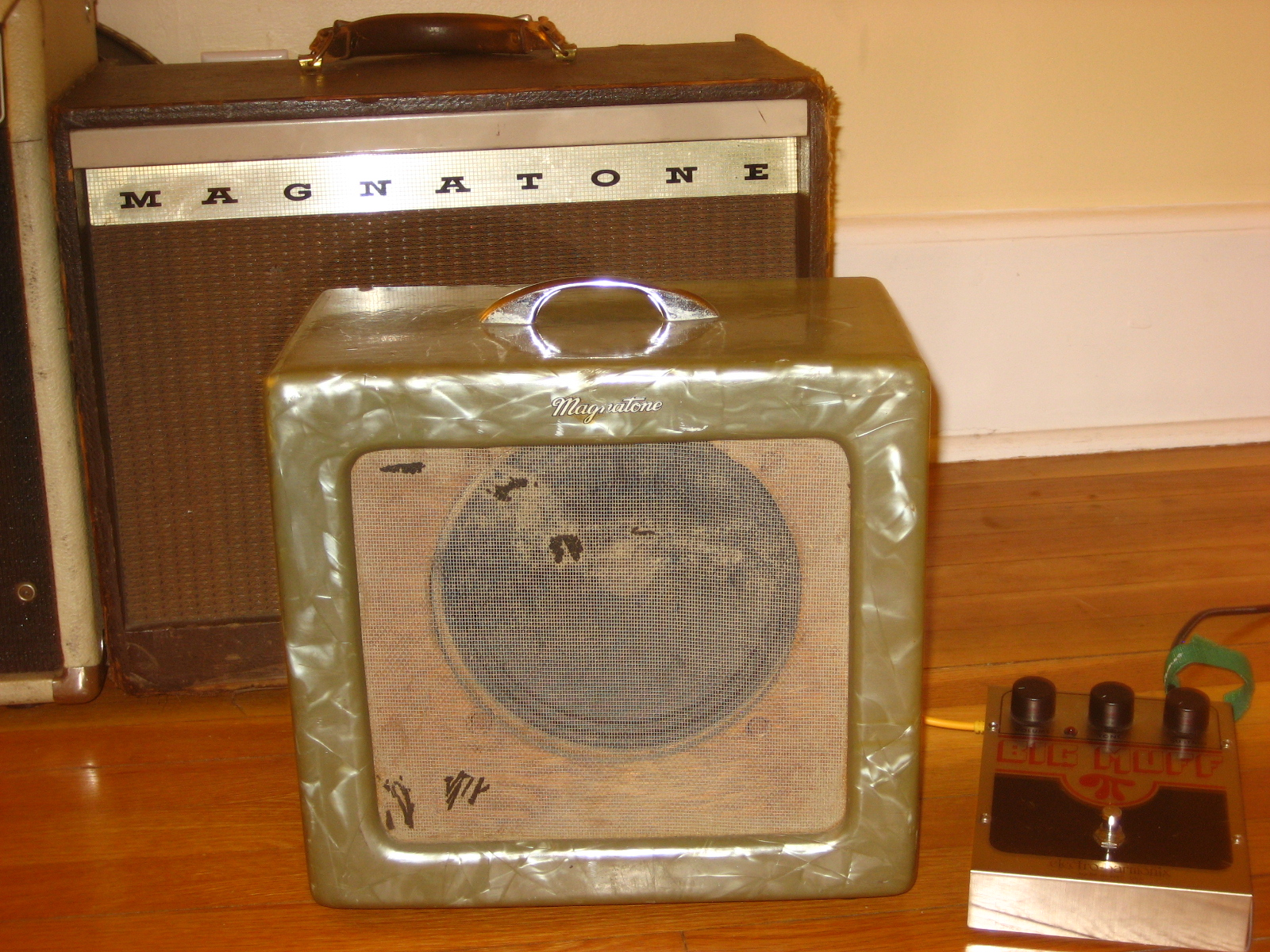
front: Magnatone Varsity (c.1953) rear: Magnatone 213 Troubador (c.1957) providing true vibrato called F.M.Vibrato.

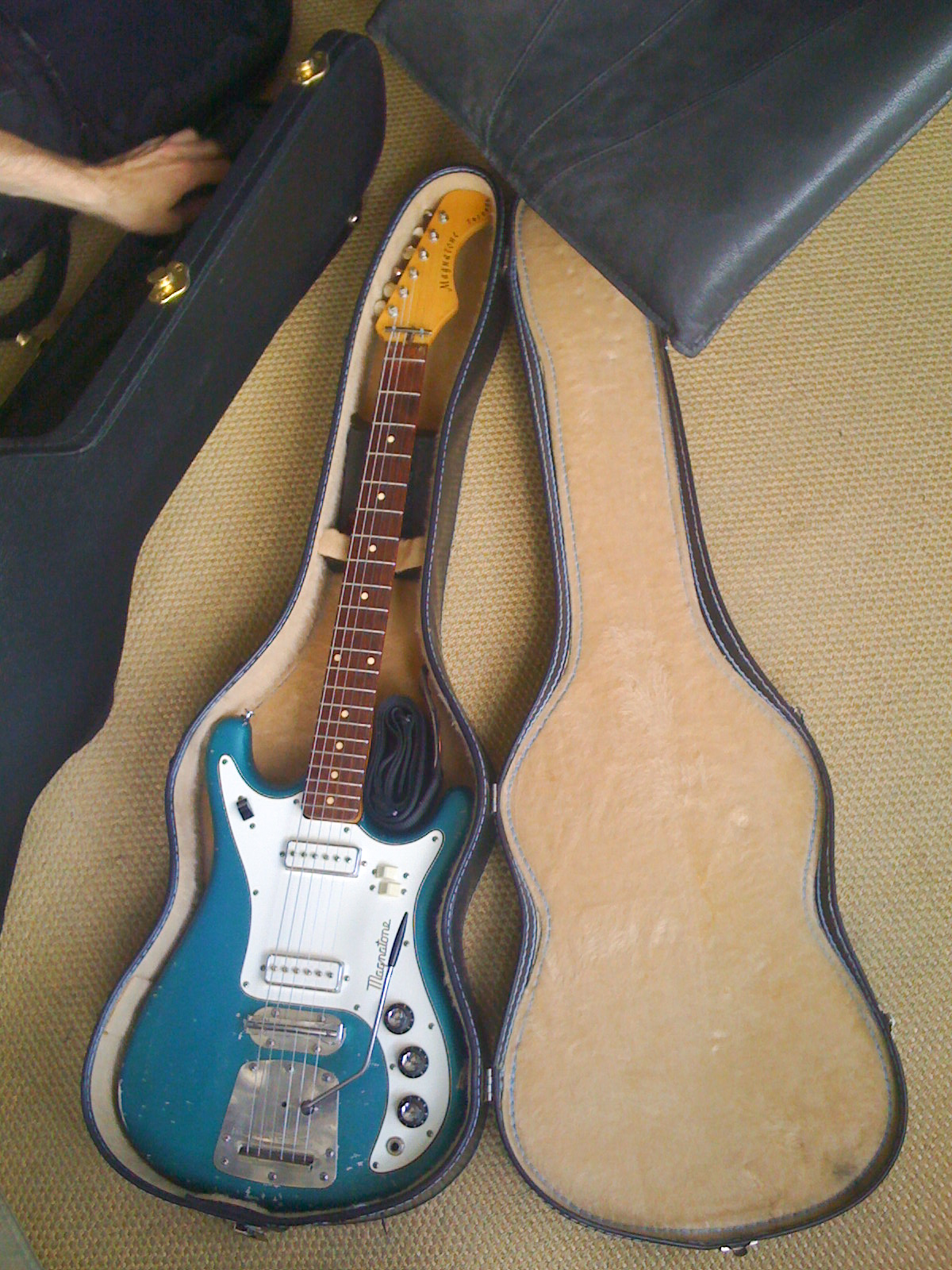
Magnatone guitar

Magnatone is an American company that produces guitar amplifiers. The company was founded in 1937, producing amps and guitars until closing down in 1969. The brand was revived in 2013 by Ted Kornblum to produce both new amp models and models that pay tribute to Magantone's original era.

== History ==
Magnatone amplifiers began in the late 1930s as the Dickerson Musical Instrument Company founded by Delbert J. Dickerson in southern California. Beginning in the late 1930s, Magna Electronics was known as Dickerson Musical Instrument Manufacturing Company and produced amplifiers, Hawaiian and steel guitars.

In the 1940s, Gaston Fator Guitar Studios in Los Angeles bought the business from Dickerson. Fator owned it for a few years, and then sold it to Art Duhamell around 1946, who changed the name to Magnatone.

In the 1950s and 1960s, the company produced vibrato-equipped amplifiers which were used by musicians including Buddy Holly and Lonnie Mack. The 'real' vibrato effect called F.M. Vibrato was distinct in sound and design from the more common tremolo circuits found on Fender amplifiers.

In the hands of its new owner, Art Duhamell, the amplifier and guitar brand name was changed to Magnatone, and the company name was Magna Electronics Company. Duhamell built Magnatones alongside record players, radios, and speakers. By 1950, Magna expanded from their Jefferson Boulevard, Los Angeles location with three new buildings at 9749 S. Freeman Ave. and employed more than twenty-five employees.

Paul Bigsby designed solid-body guitars for Magnatone from 1955–1957.

Pioneering blues-rock guitar soloist Lonnie Mack used Magnatone vibrato amps almost exclusively. A Magnatone amp was also the basis of the signature guitar sound of Robert Ward. They are still used today by musicians including Neil Young, who uses a 280 Stereo in his live rig.

== Revival ==
The brand was revived in early 2013 with a line of boutique amps, some of which are reproductions of previous Magnatone designs. The brand name was revived by Ted Kornblum (formerly of Ampeg and St. Louis Music), and input on the amps' respective designs was provided by Billy Gibbons and Neil Young's guitar tech, Larry Cragg. The new line of six different Magnatone models debuted at the 2013 NAMM Show in Anaheim, California.
