= Rick Lindy =

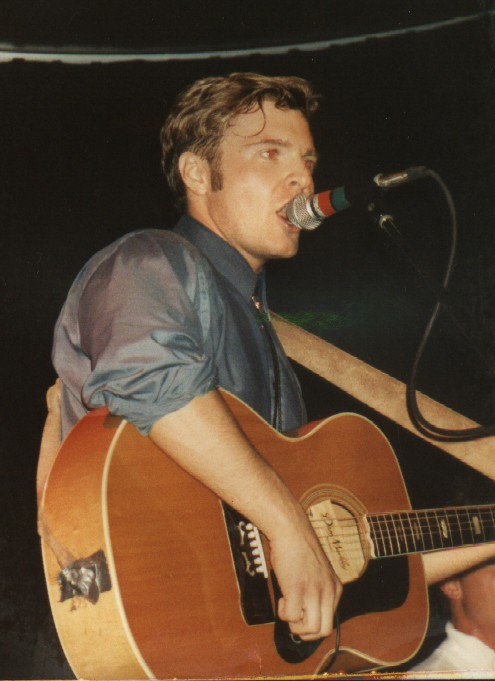

Background information
- Born: Richard Lindy Schwartz, Jr. June 30, 1967 (age 58)
- Origin: Chicago, Illinois
- Genres: Rockabilly, Country
- Occupation: Musician
- Instruments: Vocals, guitar
- Years active: 1990–present

Rick Lindy (born June 30, 1967) is an actor and country/rockabilly musician from Chicago, Illinois. He has performed with the Big Guitars from Memphis as well as leading his own band, Rick Lindy and the Wild Ones. An earlier band, the Cyclones, backed up Hayden Thompson for a show on Oct 2, 1992. Lindy's first solo single, "Working Man Blues" (1990), was produced by John Capps and featured DJ Fontana on drums.

== Acting ==
As a stage actor, Lindy has appeared in several plays and musicals, including 1776, The Music Man, The Sound of Music, A View from the Bridge, How to Succeed in Business Without Really Trying, South Pacific, Annie Get Your Gun and Bye Bye Birdie.

== The Serendipity Singers ==
From 1990 to 1992 Lindy toured as a member of The Serendipity Singers folk group.

== Rick Lindy and The Lost Wages ==
Lindy formed the band Rick Lindy and The Lost Wages in 1991. The line-up included Lindy on vocals and rhythm guitar, Craig Reedus on lead guitar, Jim Zielinski on bass and Ron Fitzgerald on drums.

== Rick Lindy and The Cyclones ==
Lindy formed the band Rick Lindy and The Cyclones in 1992. The line-up included Lindy on vocals and rhythm guitar, Steve Dvorak on lead guitar, Butch Nelson on drums and Todd Menke on upright bass.

== Big Guitars from Memphis ==
Lindy joined the ever changing cast of musicians that form Big Guitars from Memphis in 1995 and performed with them until 2000. The line-up at that point was Lindy on vocals and rhythm guitar, John Ivan on lead guitar, Buddha Slim on keyboards and bass and Butch Nelson on drums. The debut TV appearance for this line up was in May 1996 on the Danish TV show "Apollo" with The Georgia Satellites and Herman's Hermits.

The band toured the world, including Austria, Denmark, Norway, Germany, Sweden, Scotland and England. The band shared the stage with artists such as Robert Gordon, Charlie McCoy, Hank Thompson, Wanda Jackson, Carlene Carter and The Derailers.

During Lindy's time with the band, there were several different bass players and drummers. John Ivan is the only constant member of the band.

== Rick Lindy and the Wild Ones ==
Rick Lindy and The Wild Ones were formed in 2000 and were once described as "Dave Edmunds goes country". The band has played shows in Norway, Denmark, Germany, Sweden and the Faeroe Islands. The Wild Ones have released two CDs, "Wild Side of Town" and "American Dream." both on the Norwegian label Flipside Records. The current line-up includes Lindy on vocals and guitar, James Lynch (guitar), Jason Minor (guitar), Jim Matheson (guitar), Ben Mason (bass), Tracy Shepard (drums). Previous members include Jim Nelson (bass), Todd Menke (guitar), Andy Trippi (drums), Nate Adams (stand up bass) Ray Kainz (guitar), Malcolm Didier (bass), Mike Hosman(drums), Joe Smith (drums), Dave Elliot (guitar), Eric T. Stoliker (bass) and Gary Bloom (keyboards).

== Partial discography ==
Big Guitars from Memphis

- 8 Ball (1996)
- Plan 9 (1997)
- The Best of Big Guitars From Memphis (1998)
- The Ten Most Wanted (2000)

Rick Lindy and the Wild Ones

- Wild Side of Town (Flipside, 2001)
- American Dream (Flipside, 2002)
- Rockin' the Jukebox (Volume 1) (Chevere/Roxy, 2016)
- Rockin' the Jukebox (Volume 2) (Chevere/Roxy, 2017)
- Something to Sing About (Chevere/Roxy, 2018)

Rick Lindy (solo)

- "Working Man Blues" / "Tantalize My Heart" (45 single, 1990)
- Jump Swing (Chevere/Roxy, 2018)
- Rick Lindy sings Roy Orbison (Chevere/Roxy, 2019)
- Rick Lindy salutes Johnny Cash (Chevere/Roxy, 2020)
- Rick Lindy salutes The Beatles (Chevere/Roxy, 2020)
- Rick Lindy salutes Elvis Presley's Aloha from Hawaii Concert (Chevere/Roxy, 2020)
- Rick Lindy sings Buddy Holly (Chevere/Roxy, 2020)
- Rick Lindy's Rockin' Swingin' Christmas (Chevere/Roxy, 2020)
