= Fraternity Records =

American record label based in Cincinnati

Fraternity Records is a small record label based in Cincinnati, Ohio. It was started by Harry Carlson and silent partner Dr. Ashton Welsh in 1954. The first recording to be released on Fraternity was Jerri Winters' "Winter's Here". The first hit was Cathy Carr's rendition of a Tin Pan Alley song, "Ivory Tower" in 1956. It made #2, besting a cover version by Otis Williams & the Charms. A year later came the Jimmy Dorsey #2 charting instrumental "So Rare", the famous bandleader's final hit before his death. 1959 saw another big hit, Bill Parsons' "The All American Boy", which also peaked at #2 on the Billboard pop charts. Parsons was a friend of country singer Bobby Bare and it was actually Bare's voice heard on the hit record. Parsons sang on the B-side. Fraternity also leased songs from smaller labels, including one track by Jackie Shannon (later Jackie DeShannon).

Fraternity's biggest-selling hit was Lonnie Mack's 1963 guitar instrumental cover of the Chuck Berry song "Memphis", which rose to #5 on Billboard′s Pop chart and #4 on Billboard′s R&B chart.

The final national Top 40 hit for the label was "Then You Can Tell Me Goodbye" by The Casinos, which reached #6 on the Billboard pop chart in 1967.

Shad O'Shea purchased the company from Carlson in 1975.

Applegate Recording Society was also a subsidiary label of Fraternity.

UK reissue label Ace Records Ltd. currently makes a large handful of Fraternity recordings available on compact disc albums and digital downloads, including the original big hits mentioned here.

== See also ==
- List of record labels
