= Aretha Franklin discography =

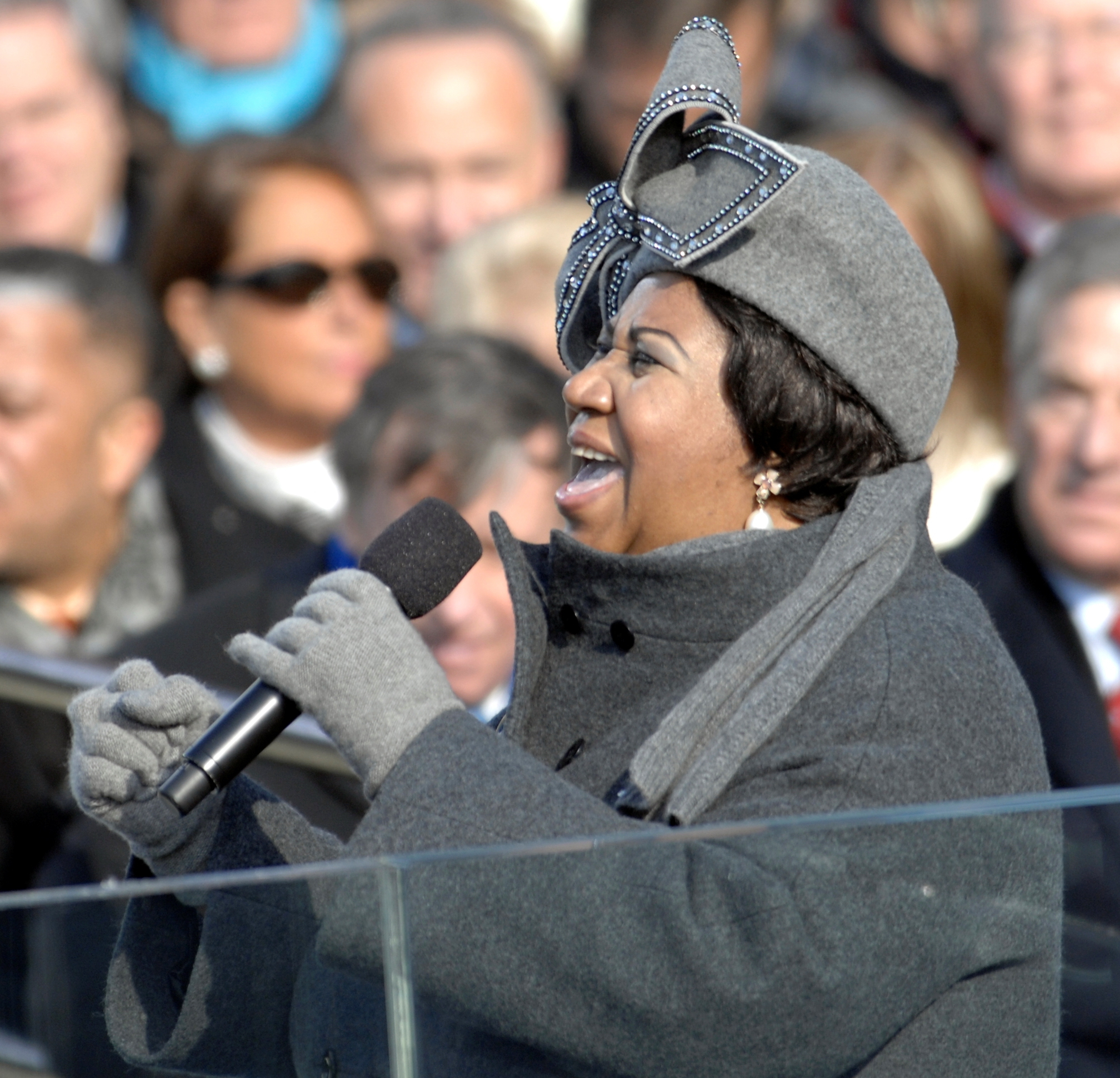
- Franklin performing at President Barack Obama's inauguration in 2009
- Studio albums: 38
- Soundtrack albums: 1
- Live albums: 6
- Compilation albums: 64
- Singles: 131

This discography documents the releases of albums and singles by Aretha Franklin. Widely regarded as the "Queen of Soul", she has sold more than 75 million records worldwide, making her one of the best-selling R&B female artists of all time. Billboard ranks her as the 34th Greatest Artist of all time. Franklin has scored 73 entries on the Billboard Hot 100, the most among women for nearly 50 years until Nicki Minaj passed her in 2017. Billboard listed her as the 41st Top Gospel Artist of the 2010s. She has accumulated 20 No. 1 hits on Billboard's Hot R&B/Hip-Hop Songs.

Amazing Grace remains the biggest-selling live gospel album of all time, being certified 2× Platinum in the US. According to RIAA database, Franklin has sold 16.5 million albums and singles in the US (based on certifications).

She is ranked first among female vocalists with the most Billboard chart hits during the rock era (1955–2012) with a total of 88 according to Joel Whitburn's Record Research. In total cumulative weeks, Franklin is the seventh most successful female artist on the Billboard 200 with a total of 995 cumulative weeks on the chart behind Rihanna, Whitney Houston, Adele, Madonna, Barbra Streisand and Taylor Swift.

== Albums ==
=== Studio albums ===
Album	Year	Peak chart positions										Sales	Certifications	Record label
Album	Year	US	US R&B /HH	AUS	CAN	FRA	GER	NL	NZ	SWI	UK	Sales	Certifications	Record label
Aretha	1961	—	—	—	—	—	—	—	—	—	—			Columbia
The Electrifying Aretha Franklin	1962	—	—	—	—	—	—	—	—	—	—			Columbia
The Tender, the Moving, the Swinging Aretha Franklin	1962	69	—	—	—	—	—	—	—	—	—			Columbia
Laughing on the Outside	1963	—	—	—	—	—	—	—	—	—	—			Columbia
Unforgettable: A Tribute to Dinah Washington	1964	—	—	—	—	—	—	—	—	—	—			Columbia
Runnin' Out of Fools	1964	84	9	—	—	—	—	—	—	—	—			Columbia
Yeah	1965	101	8	—	—	—	—	—	—	93	—			Columbia
Soul Sister	1966	132	8	—	—	—	—	—	—	—	—			Columbia
I Never Loved a Man the Way I Love You	1967	2	1	—	2	—	—	—	—	—	36		RIAA: Gold	Atlantic
Take It Like You Give It	1967	—	—	—	—	—	—	—	—	—	—			Columbia
Aretha Arrives	1967	5	1	—	18	—	—	—	—	—	—			Atlantic
Lady Soul	1968	2	1	—	—	—	18	—	—	—	25		RIAA: Gold	Atlantic
Aretha Now	1968	3	1	—	12	—	26	—	—	—	6		RIAA: Gold	Atlantic
Soul '69	1969	15	1	—	15	—	—	—	—	—	9			Atlantic
Soft and Beautiful	1969	—	29	—	—	—	—	—	—	—	—			Columbia
This Girl's in Love with You	1970	17	2	8	18	—	—	—	—	—	—			Atlantic
Spirit in the Dark	1970	25	2	25		—	—	—	—	—	—			Atlantic
Young, Gifted and Black	1972	11	2	53	—	—	—	—	—	—	—		RIAA: Gold	Atlantic
Hey Now Hey (The Other Side of the Sky)	1973	30	2	—	—	—	—	—	—	—	—			Atlantic
Let Me in Your Life	1974	14	1	88	15	—	—	—	—	—	—			Atlantic
With Everything I Feel in Me	1974	57	6	—	—	—	—	—	—	—	—			Atlantic
You	1975	83	9	—	—	—	—	—	—	—	—			Atlantic
Sweet Passion	1977	49	6	—	—	—	—	—	—	—	—			Atlantic
Almighty Fire	1978	63	12	—	63	—	—	—	—	—	—			Atlantic
La Diva	1979	146	25	—	—	—	—	—	—	—	—			Atlantic
Aretha	1980	47	6	—	—	—	—	—	—	—	—			Arista
Love All the Hurt Away	1981	36	4	—	—	—	—	—	—	—	—			Arista
Jump to It	1982	23	1	—	—	—	—	—	—	—	—		RIAA: Gold	Arista
Get It Right	1983	36	4	—	—	—	—	—	—	—	—			Arista
Who's Zoomin' Who?	1985	13	3	15	13	—	46	50	6	21	49		RIAA: Platinum; BPI: Silver; MC: Platinum; RMNZ: Gold	Arista
Aretha	1986	32	7	33	56	—	45	60	20	23	51		RIAA: Gold; MC: Gold	Arista
Through the Storm	1989	55	21	108	71	—	61	—	—	19	46			Arista
What You See Is What You Sweat	1991	153	28	164	56	—	—	—	—	26	—	US: 179,000		Arista
A Rose Is Still a Rose	1998	30	7	173	—	59	—	—	—	36	—	US: 294,000	RIAA: Gold	Arista
So Damn Happy	2003	33	11	—	—	106	—	—	—	—	—	US: 304,000		Arista
This Christmas, Aretha	2008	102	—	—	—	—	—	—	—	—	—			DMI
Aretha: A Woman Falling Out of Love	2011	54	15	—	—	—	—	—	—	—	—			Aretha
Aretha Franklin Sings the Great Diva Classics	2014	13	3	30	—	44	—	—	32	30	32			RCA
"—" denotes a recording that did not chart or was not released in that territory.

=== Live albums ===
Album	Year	Peak chart positions					Certifications	Record label
Album	Year	US	US R&B /HH	CAN	HUN	JP	Certifications	Record label
Songs of Faith	1965	—	—	—	—	—		Checker
Aretha in Paris	1968	13	2	14	—	—		Atlantic
Aretha Live at Fillmore West	1971	7	1	18	—	191	RIAA: Gold	Atlantic
Amazing Grace	1972	7	2	23	—	42	RIAA: 2× Platinum	Atlantic
One Lord, One Faith, One Baptism	1987	106	25	—	—	—		Arista
Gospel Greats	1999	—	—	—	—	—		Atlantic
Don't Fight the Feeling: Live at Fillmore West (with King Curtis)	2005	—	—	—	—	157		Rhino
Oh Me Oh My: Aretha Live in Philly, 1972	2007	—	—	—	40	—		Rhino
"—" denotes a recording that did not chart or was not released in that territory.

=== Soundtrack albums ===
Album	Year	Peak chart positions			Certifications	Record label
Album	Year	US	US R&B /HH	CAN	Certifications	Record label
Sparkle	1976	18	1	58	RIAA: Gold	Atlantic

=== Compilation albums ===
Album	Year	Peak chart positions											Sales	Certifications	Record label
Album	Year	US	US R&B /HH	AUS	BEL (WA)	CAN	FRA	GER	HUN	NL	NZ	UK	Sales	Certifications	Record label
Take a Look	1967	173	22	—	—	—	—	—	—	—	—	—			Columbia
Aretha Franklin's Greatest Hits	1967	94	10	—	—	—	—	—	30	—	—	—			Columbia
Aretha Franklin's Greatest Hits Volume II	1968	—	—	—	—	—	—	—	—	—	—	—			Columbia
Aretha's Gold	1969	18	1	—	—	22	—	—	—	—	—	—		ARIA: Gold	Atlantic
Today I Sing the Blues	1969	—	—	—	—	—	—	—	—	—	—	—			Columbia
Aretha's Greatest Hits	1971	19	3	—	—	27	—	—	—	—	—	—			Atlantic
In the Beginning: The World of Aretha Franklin 1960–1967	1972	160	—	—	—	—	—	—	—	—	—	—			Columbia
The Best of Aretha Franklin	1973	—	—	—	—	—	—	—	—	—	—	—			Atlantic
Ten Years of Gold	1976	135	29	—	—	—	—	—	—	—	—	—			Atlantic
The Legendary Queen of Soul	1981	209	—	—	—	—	—	—	—	—	—	—			Columbia
Sweet Bitter Love	1982	—	—	—	—	—	—	—	—	—	—	—			Columbia
Aretha's Jazz	1984	—	—	—	—	—	—	—	—	—	—	—			Atlantic
The Best of Aretha Franklin	1984	—	—	25	—	—	—	—	—	—	—	91		BPI: Silver	Atlantic
30 Greatest Hits	1985	6	1	16	—	9	—	—	—	—	—	16	US: 18,000	BPI: Silver	Atlantic
Aretha Sings the Blues	1985	—	—	—	—	—	—	—	—	—	—	—			Columbia
The First Lady of Soul	1986	—	—	—	—	—	—	—	—	—	—	89		BPI: Silver	Stylus
20 Greatest Hits	1987	—	—	—	—	—	—	—	—	—	—	—		SNEP: 2× Gold	WEA
Aretha After Hours	1987	—	—	—	—	—	—	—	—	—	—	—			Columbia
Jazz to Soul	1992	—	—	—	—	—	—	—	—	—	—	—			Columbia
Queen of Soul: The Atlantic Recordings	1992	—	99	17	—	—	—	—	—	—	—	—	US: 72,000	AUS: Gold	Rhino
Chain of Fools	1993	—	—	—	—	—	—	—	—	—	—	—			Rhino
Greatest Hits: 1980–1994	1994	85	23	82	—	—	—	75	—	—	—	27	US: 439,000	RIAA: Platinum; BPI: Silver	Arista
The Very Best of Aretha Franklin, Vol. 1: The 60's	1994	105	10	13	—	—	108	—	—	—	—	—	US: 1,100,000	RIAA: Platinum; SNEP: Gold	Rhino
The Very Best of Aretha Franklin, Vol. 2: The 70's	1994	—	—	—	—	—	—	—	—	—	—	—			Rhino
Queen of Soul: The Very Best of Aretha Franklin	1994	—	—	—	—	—	—	—	—	—	—	20		BPI: Gold	Rhino
Sings Standards	1996	—	—	—	—	—	—	—	—	—	—	—			Sony Music
The Early Years	1997	—	—	—	—	—	—	—	—	—	—	—			Legacy
A Natural Woman & Other Hits	1997	—	—	—	—	—	—	—	—	—	—	—			Rhino
Respect & Other Hits	1997	—	—	—	—	—	—	—	—	—	—	—		RIAA: Gold	Rhino
The Delta Meets Detroit: Aretha's Blues	1998	—	—	—	—	—	—	—	—	—	—	—			Rhino
Spanish Harlem	1998	—	—	—	—	—	—	—	—	—	—	—			Rhino
Think & Other Hits	1998	—	—	—	—	—	—	—	—	—	—	—			Rhino
This Is Jazz, Vol. 34	1998	—	—	—	—	—	—	—	—	—	—	—			Sony Music
Greatest Hits	1998	—	—	189	—	—	—	—	—	—	—	38		BPI: Gold	Global TV
Love Songs	2001	—	—	—	—	—	—	—	—	—	—	—			Sony Music
Aretha's Best	2001	49	4	—	—	—	—	—	—	—	—	—	US: 169,000		Rhino
Respect: The Very Best of Aretha Franklin	2002	—	—	34	—	—	—	96	—	22	14	15		BPI: Gold	Warner Music
The Queen in Waiting: The Columbia Years (1960–1965)	2002	—	—	—	—	—	—	—	—	—	—	—			Legacy
Platinum & Gold Collection	2003	—	—	—	—	—	—	—	—	—	—	—	US: 495,000		Arista
Rare & Unreleased Recordings from the Golden Reign of the Queen of Soul	2007	—	87	—	—	—	—	—	—	—	—	—			Atlantic
Jewels in the Crown: All-Star Duets with the Queen	2007	54	7	186	—	—	—	—	—	—	—	—			Arista
A Deeper Love: The Best of Aretha Franklin	2009	—	—	—	—	—	—	—	—	—	—	—			Sony BMG
Sunday Morning Classics	2009	—	—	—	—	—	—	—	—	—	—	—			Columbia
Original Album Series	2009	—	—	22	—	—	—	—	—	—	—	44			Rhino
The Very Best of Aretha Franklin	2010	—	—	—	—	—	—	—	—	—	—	59			Rhino
Great American Songbook	2011	—	—	—	—	—	—	—	—	—	—	—			Legacy
More Gospel Greats	2011	—	—	—	—	—	—	—	—	—	—	—			Rhino
Take a Look: Aretha Franklin Complete on Columbia	2011	—	—	—	—	—	—	—	—	—	—	—			Legacy
Knew You Were Waiting: The Best of Aretha Franklin 1980–1998	2012	—	—	—	—	—	—	—	—	—	—	—			Legacy
The Very Best of Aretha Franklin & Otis Redding Together (with Otis Redding)	2012	78	—	20	—	—	—	—	—	—	11	—		BPI: Silver	Rhino
Soul Queen	2012	—	—	—	11	—	140	—	—	34	—	15			Rhino
Original Album Series Vol. 2	2013	—	—	—	—	—	—	—	37	—	—	—			Atlantic
The Queen Greatest Hits	2013	—	—	—	—	—	—	—	—	—	—	—			Sony Music
The Queen of Soul (box set)	2014	—	—	—	124	—	—	—	—	—	—	—			Atlantic
The Real... Aretha Franklin – The Ultimate Collection	2014	—	—	—	—	—	—	—	—	—	—	—			RCA
The Atlantic Albums Collection	2015	—	—	—	—	—	—	—	—	—	—	—			Atlantic
A Brand New Me	2017	—	—	23	22	—	79	64	—	22	36	45			Rhino, Atlantic
The Atlantic Singles Collection 1967–1970	2018	65	7	—	79	—	—	—	22	—	—	—			Rhino, Atlantic
The Queen of Soul	2018	—	—	—	123	—	—	—	—	34	—	45			Rhino, Atlantic
The Genesis of Aretha Franklin	2021	—	—	—	—	—	—	—	—	—	—	—			Columbia
The Glory of Aretha Franklin	2021	—	—	—	—	—	—	—	—	—	—	—			Arista, RCA
The Genius of Aretha Franklin	2021	—	—	—	—	—	—	—	32	—	—	—			Atlantic
Aretha (4-CD box set & digital edition; also 2-LP & 1-CD highlights)	2021	—	—	—	120	—	152	—	11	—	—	—			Rhino
"—" denotes a recording that did not chart or was not released in that territory.

== Singles ==
=== The JVB era (1956–1959) ===
Year	Single
1956	"Never Grow Old" ^{[A]}
1959	"Precious Lord (Part 1)" ^{[B]}

Notes

- ^{A} "Never Grow Old" was reissued by Checker Records in 1957, 1968 and 1973.
- ^{B} "Precious Lord (Part 1)" was reissued by Checker Records in 1960 and 1969.

=== The Columbia era (1960–1966) ===
Single	Year	Single information	Peak chart positions					Album
Single	Year	Single information	US	US R&B	US A/C	AUS	CAN	Album
"Today I Sing the Blues" c/w "Love Is the Only Thing"	1960	October 1960; Columbia; "Today I Sing the Blues" - 41793-51461; "Love Is the Only Thing" - 41793-51462	—	10	—	—	—	Aretha: With The Ray Bryant Combo
"Won't Be Long" c/w "Right Now"	1960	December 1960; Columbia; "Right Now" - 41923-52417; "Won't Be Long" - 41923-52418	76	7	—	—	—	Aretha: With The Ray Bryant Combo
"Are You Sure" b/w "Maybe I'm a Fool"	1961	April 1961; Columbia; "Are You Sure" - 41985-53175; "Maybe I'm a Fool" - 41985-53176	—	—	—	—	—	Aretha: With The Ray Bryant Combo
"Rock-a-Bye Your Baby with a Dixie Melody" (A-side)	1961	September 1961; Columbia; "Rock-a-Bye Your Baby with a Dixie Melody" - 42157-54730; "Operation Heartbreak" - 42157-54731	37	—	—	30	12	The Electrifying Aretha Franklin
"Operation Heartbreak" (B-side)	1961	September 1961; Columbia; "Rock-a-Bye Your Baby with a Dixie Melody" - 42157-54730; "Operation Heartbreak" - 42157-54731	—	6	—	—	—	non-album track
"I Surrender, Dear" (A-side)	1962	January 1962; Columbia; "I Surrender, Dear" - 42266-55745; "Rough Lover" - 42266-55746	87	—	—	—	—	The Electrifying Aretha Franklin
"Rough Lover" (B-side)	1962	January 1962; Columbia; "I Surrender, Dear" - 42266-55745; "Rough Lover" - 42266-55746	94	—	—	—	—	The Electrifying Aretha Franklin
"Don't Cry, Baby" c/w "Without the One You Love"	1962	June 1962; Columbia; "Without the One You Love" - 42456-57127; "Don't Cry, Baby" - 42456-57128	92	—	—	—	—	The Tender, the Moving, the Swinging Aretha Franklin
"Just for a Thrill" (A-side)	1962	August 1962; Columbia; "Try a Little Tenderness" - 42520-57690; "Just for a Thrill" - 42520-57691	111	—	—	—	—	The Tender, the Moving, the Swinging Aretha Franklin
"Try a Little Tenderness" (B-side)	1962	August 1962; Columbia; "Try a Little Tenderness" - 42520-57690; "Just for a Thrill" - 42520-57691	100	—	—	—	—	The Tender, the Moving, the Swinging Aretha Franklin
"Trouble in Mind" c/w "God Bless the Child" (from The Tender, the Moving, the Swinging Aretha Franklin)	1962	c. November–December 1962; Columbia; "Trouble in Mind" - 42625-58445; "God Bless the Child" - 42625-58446	86	—	—	—	—	non-album tracks
"Here's Where I Came In (Here's Where I Walk Out)" (A-side)	1963	May 1963; Columbia; "Say It Isn't So" - 42796-71349; "Here's Where I Came In" - 42796-71350	125	—	—	—	—	non-album tracks
"Say It Isn't So" (B-side)	1963	May 1963; Columbia; "Say It Isn't So" - 42796-71349; "Here's Where I Came In" - 42796-71350	113	—	—	—	—	Laughing on the Outside
"Skylark" c/w "You've Got Her" (non-album track)	1963	September 1963; Columbia; "You've Got Her" - 42874-71348; "Skylark" - 75734	—	—	—	—	—	Laughing on the Outside
"Kissin' by the Mistletoe" c/w "Johnny" (non-album track)	1963	December 1963; Columbia; "Kissin' by the Mistletoe" - 42933-76424; "Johnny" 42933-76425	—	—	—	—	—	An All-Star Christmas
"Soulville" c/w "Evil Gal Blues"	1964	c. March–April 1964; Columbia; "Evil Gal Blues" - 43009-77198; "Soulville" - 43009-77218	121	—	—	—	—	Unforgettable: A Tribute to Dinah Washington
"Runnin' Out of Fools" c/w "It's Just a Matter of Time"	1964	c. August–September 1964; Columbia; "Runnin' Out of Fools" - 43113-78448; "It's Just a Matter of Time" - 43113-78453	57	30	—	—	—	Runnin' Out of Fools
"Winter Wonderland" c/w "The Christmas Song (Chestnuts Roasting on an Open Fire)"	1964	c. November–December 1964; Columbia; "The Christmas Song" - 43177-79156; "Winter Wonderland" - 43177-79157	—	—	—	—	—	non-album single
"Can't You Just See Me" (A-side)	1965		96	—	—	—	—	Soul Sister
"Little Miss Raggedy Ann" (B-side)	1965		—	—	—	—	—	non-album single
"One Step Ahead"	1965		119	18	—	—	—	non-album single
"(No, No) I'm Losing You"	1965		114	—	34	—	—	Soul Sister
"You Made Me Love You"	1965		109	—	32	—	—	Soul Sister
"Tighten Up Your Tie, Button Up Your Jacket"	1966		—	—	—	—	—	Take It Like You Give It
"Until You Were Gone"	1966		—	—	—	—	—	Soul Sister
"Cry Like a Baby"	1966		113	27	—	—	—	Soul Sister
"—" denotes a recording that did not chart or was not released in that territory.

The following singles were released or re-released after Franklin left Columbia.

Single	Year	Peak chart positions			Album
Single	Year	US	US R&B	CAN	Album
"Lee Cross"	1967	—	31	—	Take It Like You Give It
"Take a Look"	1967	56	28	36	Take a Look
"Mockingbird"	1967	94	—	57	Runnin' Out of Fools
"Soulville" (re-release)	1968	83	—	—	Unforgettable: A Tribute to Dinah Washington
"Jim"	1969	—	—	—	Soft and Beautiful
"Today I Sing the Blues" (re-recording)	1969	101	—	—	Soul '69
"—" denotes a recording that did not chart or was not released in that territory.

=== The Atlantic era (1967–1979) ===
Single	Year	Peak chart positions									Certifications	Album
Single	Year	US	US R&B	US A/C	AUS	BEL (WA)	CAN	GER	NL	UK	Certifications	Album
"I Never Loved a Man (The Way I Love You)" (A-side)	1967	9	1	—	—	—	5	—	—	—	RIAA: Gold	I Never Loved a Man the Way I Love You
"Do Right Woman — Do Right Man" (B-side)	1967	—	37	—	—	—	—	—	—	—		I Never Loved a Man the Way I Love You
"Respect"	1967	1	1	—	14	18	3	23	7	10	RIAA: Gold; BPI: Platinum	I Never Loved a Man the Way I Love You
"Baby I Love You"	1967	4	1	—	51	—	3	—	—	39	RIAA: Gold; BPI: Gold	Aretha Arrives
"(You Make Me Feel Like) A Natural Woman"	1967	8	2	—	36	—	11	—	28	79	BPI: Platinum	Lady Soul
"Chain of Fools"	1967	2	1	—	51	23	4	36	12	37	RIAA: Gold	Lady Soul
"(I Can't Get No) Satisfaction"	1968	—	—	—	—	—	—	—	—	37		Aretha Arrives
"(Sweet Sweet Baby) Since You've Been Gone" (A-side)	1968	5	1	—		—	6	—	22	47	RIAA: Gold	Lady Soul
"Ain't No Way" (B-side)	1968	16	9	—	—	—	—	—	—	—		Lady Soul
"Think" (A-side)	1968	7	1	—	49	25	6	32	12	26	RIAA: Gold; BPI: Silver	Aretha Now
"You Send Me" (B-side)	1968	56	28	—	—	—	—	—	—	—		Aretha Now
"The House That Jack Built" (A-side)	1968	6	2	—	—	—	11	34	—	—		Aretha's Gold
"I Say a Little Prayer" (B-side)	1968	10	3	—	8	7	—	29	3	4	RIAA: Gold; BPI: Platinum	Aretha Now
"See Saw" (A-side)	1968	14	9	—	29	47	11	—	19	—	RIAA: Gold	Aretha Now
"My Song" (B-side)	1968	31	10	—	—	—	—	—	—	—		Non-album single
"The Weight" (A-side)	1969	19	3	—	38	—	12	—	—	—		This Girl's in Love with You
"Tracks of My Tears" (B-side)	1969	71	21	—	—	—	—	—	—	—		Soul '69
"I Can't See Myself Leaving You" (A-side)	1969	28	3	—	—	—	22	—	—	—		Aretha Now
"Gentle on My Mind" (B-side)	1969	76	50	—	—	—	—	—	—	—		Soul '69
"Share Your Love with Me"	1969	13	1	—	—	—	16	—	—	—		This Girl's in Love with You
"Eleanor Rigby"	1969	17	5	—	91	—	19	—	—	—		This Girl's in Love with You
"Call Me" (A-side)	1970	13	1	—	—	—	11	—	—	—		This Girl's in Love with You
"Son of a Preacher Man" (B-side)	1970	13	—	—	—	—	—	—	—	—		This Girl's in Love with You
"Don't Play That Song (You Lied)" (with The Dixie Flyers)	1970	11	1	—	—	—	13	—	—	13	RIAA: Gold	Spirit in the Dark
"Spirit in the Dark" (with The Dixie Flyers) (A-side)	1970	23	3	—	—	—	48	—	—	—		Spirit in the Dark
"The Thrill Is Gone" (with The Dixie Flyers) (B-side)	1970	—	3	—	—	—	—	—	—	—		Spirit in the Dark
"Border Song (Holy Moses)" (A-side)	1970	37	5	—	—	—	35	—	—	—		Young, Gifted and Black
"You and Me" (with The Dixie Flyers) (B-side)	1970	37	5	—	—	—	—	—	—	—		Spirit in the Dark
"You're All I Need to Get By"	1971	19	3	—	—	—	32	—	—	—		Aretha's Greatest Hits
"Bridge Over Troubled Water" (A-side)	1971	6	1	40	—	—	8	—	—	—	RIAA: Gold	Aretha's Greatest Hits
"A Brand New Me" (B-side)	1971	6	1	72	—	—	—	—	—	—		Young, Gifted and Black
"Spanish Harlem"	1971	2	1	6	17	—	5	6	2	14	RIAA: Gold	Aretha's Greatest Hits
"Rock Steady" (A-side)	1971	9	2	—	—	—	12	44	—	81	RIAA: Gold	Young, Gifted and Black
"Oh Me Oh My (I'm a Fool for You Baby)" (B-side)	1971	73	9	—	—	—	73	—	—	—		Young, Gifted and Black
"Day Dreaming"	1972	5	1	11	—	—	13	—	—	—	RIAA: Gold	Young, Gifted and Black
"All the King's Horses" (A-side)	1972	26	7	—	—	—	70	—	—	—		Young, Gifted and Black
"April Fools" (B-side)	1972	—	7	—	—	—	—	—	—	—		Young, Gifted and Black
"Wholy Holy"	1972	81	49	—	—	—	—	—	—	—		Amazing Grace
"Master of Eyes (The Deepness of Your Eyes)"	1973	33	8	—	—	—	61	—	—	—		Hey Now Hey (The Other Side of the Sky)
"Angel"	1973	20	1	44	—	—	47	—	—	37		Hey Now Hey (The Other Side of the Sky)
"Until You Come Back to Me (That's What I'm Gonna Do)"	1973	3	1	33	—	—	8	—	—	26	RIAA: Gold	Let Me In Your Life
"I'm in Love"	1974	19	1	—	—	—	22	—	—	—		Let Me In Your Life
"Ain't Nothing Like the Real Thing"	1974	47	6	—	—	—	44	—	—	—		Let Me In Your Life
"Without Love"	1974	45	6	—	—	—	63	—	—	—		With Everything I Feel in Me
"With Everything I Feel in Me"	1975	—	20	—	—	—	—	—	—	—		With Everything I Feel in Me
"Mr. D.J. (5 for the D.J.)"	1975	53	13	—	—	—	—	—	—	—		You
"You"	1976	—	15	—	—	—	—	—	—	—		You
"Something He Can Feel"	1976	28	1	—	—	—	—	—	—	—		Sparkle
"Jump" (A-side)	1976	72	17	—	—	—	—	—	—	—		Sparkle
"Hooked on Your Love" (B-side)	1976	—	17	—	—	—	—	—	—	—		Sparkle
"Look Into Your Heart"	1977	82	10	—	—	—	77	—	—	—		Sparkle
"Break It to Me Gently"	1977	85	1	—	—	—	—	—	—	—		Sweet Passion
"When I Think About You"	1977	—	16	—	—	—	—	—	—	—		Sweet Passion
"Almighty Fire (Woman of the Future)"	1978	103	12	—	—	—	—	—	—	—		Almighty Fire
"More Than Just a Joy"	1978	—	51	—	—	—	—	—	—	—		Almighty Fire
"Ladies Only"	1979	—	33	—	—	—	—	—	—	—		La Diva
"Half a Love"	1979	—	65	—	—	—	—	—	—	—		La Diva
"—" denotes a recording that did not chart or was not released in that territory.

=== The Arista era (1980–2007) ===
Single	Year	Peak chart positions										Certifications	Album
Single	Year	US	US R&B	US A/C	US Dan	AUS	CAN	GER	NL	NZ	UK	Certifications	Album
"United Together"	1980	56	3	—	—	—	—	—	—	—	—		Aretha (1980)
"What a Fool Believes"	1981	—	17	—	39	—	—	—	—	—	46		Aretha (1980)
"Come to Me"	1981	84	39	—	—	89	—	—	—	—	—		Aretha (1980)
"Love All the Hurt Away" (with George Benson)	1981	46	6	—	—	—	—	—	—	42	49		Love All the Hurt Away
"Hold On, I'm Comin'"	1981	—	—	—	53	—	—	—	—	—	—		Love All the Hurt Away
"It's My Turn"	1981	—	29	—	—	—	—	—	—	—	—		Love All the Hurt Away
"Livin' in the Streets"	1982	—	—	—	—	—	—	—	—	—	—		Love All the Hurt Away
"Jump to It"	1982	24	1	—	4	—	—	—	—	—	42		Jump to It
"Love Me Right"	1982	—	22	—	—	—	—	—	—	—	—		Jump to It
"This Is for Real"	1983	—	63	—	—	—	—	—	—	—	—		Jump to It
"Get It Right"	1983	61	1	—	9	—	—	—	—	—	74		Get It Right
"Every Girl (Wants My Guy)"	1983	—	7	—	—	—	—	—	—	—	—		Get It Right
"Freeway of Love"	1985	3	1	11	1	6	5	—	31	3	68		Who's Zoomin' Who?
"Who's Zoomin' Who"	1985	7	2	10	1	38	19	42	30	23	11		Who's Zoomin' Who?
"Sisters Are Doin' It for Themselves" (with Eurythmics)	1985	18	66	—	10	15	33	22	20	6	9		Who's Zoomin' Who?
"Another Night"	1986	22	9	21	4	67	44	53	—	—	54		Who's Zoomin' Who?
"Freeway of Love" (re-release)	1986	—	—	—	—	—	—	—	—	—	51		Who's Zoomin' Who?
"Ain't Nobody Ever Loved You"	1986	—	30	—	9	—	94	—	—	—	78		Who's Zoomin' Who?
"Jumpin' Jack Flash"	1986	21	20	—	33	36	21	42	—	43	58		Aretha (1986)
"Jimmy Lee"	1986	28	2	17	19	—	64	—	—	42	46		Aretha (1986)
"I Knew You Were Waiting (For Me)" (with George Michael)	1987	1	5	2	12	1	4	5	1	3	1	ARIA: Gold; BPI: Platinum; NVPI: Gold	Aretha (1986)
"Rock-A-Lott"	1987	82	25	—	4	—	—	—	—	—	84		Aretha (1986)
"If You Need My Love Tonight" (with Larry Graham)	1987	—	88	—	—	—	—	—	—	—	—		Aretha (1986)
"Oh Happy Day"	1988	—	—	—	—	—	—	—	—	—	—		One Lord, One Faith, One Baptism
"If Ever a Love There Was" (with Four Tops)	1988	—	31	26	—	—	—	—	—	—	—		Through the Storm
"Through the Storm" (with Elton John)	1989	16	17	3	—	63	18	—	—	—	41		Through the Storm
"It Isn't, It Wasn't, It Ain't Never Gonna Be" (with Whitney Houston)	1989	41	5	—	18	—	43	—	—	—	29		Through the Storm
"Gimme Your Love" (with James Brown)	1989	—	48	—	—	—	—	—	—	—	79		Through the Storm
"Everyday People"	1991	—	13	—	33	159	—	—	—	—	69		What You See Is What You Sweat
"Someone Else's Eyes"	1991	—	53	—	—	—	—	—	—	—	—		What You See Is What You Sweat
"What You See Is What You Sweat"	1991	—	—	—	—	—	—	—	—	—	—		What You See Is What You Sweat
"Ever Changing Times" (with Michael McDonald)	1992	—	19	11	—	—	38	—	—	—	—		What You See Is What You Sweat
"Someday We'll All Be Free"	1992	—	—	—	—	—	—	—	—	—	—		Malcolm X
"A Deeper Love"	1994	63	30	—	1	135	—	78	31	—	5		Greatest Hits: 1980–1994
"Willing to Forgive"	1994	26	5	22	—	—	—	—	—	—	17		Greatest Hits: 1980–1994
"Jump to It" (CJ's Master Mix)	1994	—	—	—	18	—	—	—	—	—	—		Non-album single
"Honey"	1994	114	30	—	—	—	—	—	—	—	—		Greatest Hits: 1980–1994
"It Hurts Like Hell"	1996	116	51	—	—	—	—	—	—	—	—		Waiting to Exhale: Original Soundtrack Album
"A Rose Is Still a Rose"	1998	26	5	—	1	—	—	—	—	—	22	RIAA: Gold	A Rose Is Still a Rose
"Here We Go Again"	1998	76	24	—	1	—	—	—	—	—	68		A Rose Is Still a Rose
"The Only Thing Missin'"	2003	—	53	—	7	—	—	—	—	—	—		So Damn Happy
"Wonderful"	2003	—	46	—	—	—	—	—	—	—	—		So Damn Happy
"Never Gonna Break My Faith" (with Mary J. Blige)	2007	—	103	—	—	—	—	—	—	—	—		Jewels in the Crown: All-Star Duets with the Queen
"Put You Up on Game" (with Fantasia)	2007	—	41	—	—	—	—	—	—	—	—		Jewels in the Crown: All-Star Duets with the Queen
"—" denotes a recording that did not chart or was not released in that territory.

=== The final years (2008–2018) ===
Year	Single	Peak chart positions		Album
Year	Single	US R&B	US Dan	Album
2009	"Angels We Have Heard on High"	—	—	This Christmas, Aretha
2011	"How Long I've Been Waiting"	91	—	Aretha: A Woman Falling Out of Love
2014	"Rolling in the Deep" (The Aretha Version)	47	1	Aretha Franklin Sings the Great Diva Classics
"—" denotes a recording that did not chart or was not released in that territory.

=== Billboard Hot 100 Year-End performances ===
Year	Song	Year-End Position
1967	"Respect"	13
1967	"Baby I Love You"	59
1967	"I Never Loved a Man (The Way I Love You)"	75
1968	"(Sweet Sweet Baby) Since You've Been Gone"	46
1968	"I Say a Little Prayer"	93
1968	"Think"	94
1970	"Call Me"	100
1971	"Spanish Harlem"	49
1971	"Bridge over Troubled Water"	52
1972	"Day Dreaming"	61
1974	"Until You Come Back to Me (That's What I'm Gonna Do)"	11
1985	"Freeway of Love"	43
1985	"Who's Zoomin' Who"	94
1987	"I Knew You Were Waiting (For Me)" (with George Michael)	36
1998	"A Rose Is Still a Rose"	95

== Other appearances ==
Song	Year	Album
"What Have I Got To Lose" (Four Tops feat. Aretha Franklin)	1983	Back Where I Belong
"Sisters Are Doin' It for Themselves" (duet with Eurythmics)	1985	Be Yourself Tonight
"Someday We'll All Be Free"	1992	Malcolm X (soundtrack)
"If I Lose"	1992	White Men Can't Jump (soundtrack)
"Standing On The Rock Of Love"	1992	Bebe's Kids
"O Christmas Tree"	1992	A Very Special Christmas 2
"What Now My Love" (duet with Frank Sinatra)	1993	Duets
"Respect" (live version)	1994	Grammy's Greatest Moments Volume II
"Bridge over Troubled Water" (live version)	1994	Grammy's Greatest Moments Volume III
"The Makings of You"	1994	A Tribute to Curtis Mayfield
"It Hurts Like Hell"	1995	Waiting to Exhale: Original Soundtrack Album
"You've Got a Friend" (BeBe & CeCe Winans feat. Aretha Franklin)	1995	Tapestry Revisited: A Tribute to Carole King
"Christmas Here With You" (Four Tops feat. Aretha Franklin)	1995	Christmas Here With You
"White Christmas" (Four Tops feat. Aretha Franklin)	1995	Christmas Here With You
"Silent Night" (Four Tops feat. Aretha Franklin)	1995	Christmas Here With You
"Somewhere"	1996	Somewhere: The Songs of West Side Story
"Back To Living Again"	1996	New World Order (album)
"I'll Fly Away"	1997	Diana, Princess of Wales: Tribute
"Think (Live)"	1997	Live On Letterman (Music from The Late Show)
"R-E-S-P-E-C-T" (with The Blues Brothers)	1998	Blues Brothers 2000 (soundtrack)
"Chain of Fools" (live, duet with Mariah Carey)	1998	VH1 Divas Live
"Don't Waste Your Time" (duet with Mary J. Blige)	1999	Mary
"Carry The Flame"	2002	Salt Lake City 2002 Official Music Of The Games
"A House Is Not a Home"	2005	So Amazing: An All-Star Tribute to Luther Vandross
"A Message from Aretha"	2005	I Gotta Make It
"Gotta Make It (Remix)" (Trey Songz feat. Aretha Franklin & Juvenile)	2005	I Gotta Make It
"Never Gonna Break My Faith" (duet with Mary J. Blige)	2006	Bobby - Original Soundtrack
"You've Got a Friend" (Ronald Isley feat. Aretha Franklin)	2010	Mr. I
"Ooh Baby Baby" (duet with Smokey Robinson, live December 1, 1979)	2011	The Best of Soul Train Live
"How Do You Keep the Music Playing?" (duet with Tony Bennett)	2011	Duets II (Tony Bennett album)
"O Tannenbaum" (Jazz at Lincoln Center Orchestra & Wynton Marsalis feat. Aretha Franklin)	2019	Big Band Holidays II
"Never Gonna Break My Faith" (ft. The Boys Choir of Harlem. 4.7.2020: Nr. 1 Billboard Gospel Song Chart)	2020	

== See also ==
- List of number-one hits (United States)
- List of artists who reached number one in the United States
- List of number-one dance hits (United States)
- List of artists who reached number one on the U.S. dance chart
