= Aretha's Best =

Compilation album by Aretha Franklin
- Released: May 15, 2001
- Genre: R&B
- Length: 70:07
- Label: Rhino

Aretha Franklin chronology
Love Songs (2001)	Aretha's Best (2001)	Respect: The Very Best of Aretha Franklin (2002)

Aretha's Best is a greatest hits compilation by Aretha Franklin released in 2001. This "best of" album contains 20 tracks which were recorded by Franklin from 1967-1987.

== Critical reception ==
Professional ratings
Review scores
Source	Rating
AllMusic	4.5/5 stars

Stephen Thomas Erlewine of AllMusic writes, "Rhino's Aretha's Best is notable for attempting to squeeze highlights of every era of Aretha's career onto one disc."

== Chart performance ==
Aretha's Best peaked at number 49 on the Billboard 200.

== Track listing ==
All track information and credits adapted from the album's liner notes.

No.	Title	Writer(s)	Original album	Length
1.	"Respect"	Otis Redding	I Never Loved a Man the Way I Love You (1967)	2:25
2.	"Think"	Aretha Franklin; Ted White	Aretha Now (1968)	2:19
3.	"Freeway of Love"	Narada Michael Walden; Jeffrey Cohen	Who's Zoomin' Who? (1985)	5:52
4.	"Baby, I Love You"	Ronnie Shannon	Aretha Arrives (1967)	2:43
5.	"(You Make Me Feel Like) A Natural Woman"	Carole King; Gerry Goffin; Jerry Wexler	Aretha in Paris (1968)	2:45
6.	"Day Dreaming"	Aretha Franklin	Young, Gifted and Black (1972)	4:00
7.	"I Say a Little Prayer"	Burt Bacharach; Hal David	Aretha Now	3:35
8.	"The House That Jack Built"	Bobby Lance; Fran Robbins	Released as Single (1968)	2:21
9.	"(Sweet Sweet Baby) Since You've Been Gone"	Aretha Franklin; Ted White	Lady Soul (1968)	2:26
10.	"Spanish Harlem"	Jerry Leiber; Phil Spector	Aretha's Greatest Hits (1971)	3:34
11.	"Jump To It"	Luther Vandross; Marcus Miller	Jump to It (1982)	4:16
12.	"I Knew You Were Waiting (For Me)" (duet with George Michael)	Simon Climie; Dennis Morgan	Aretha (1986)	4:01
13.	"Chain of Fools"	Don Covay	Released as Single (1967)	2:49
14.	"Rock Steady"	Aretha Franklin	Young, Gifted and Black (1972)	3:14
15.	"Who's Zoomin' Who"	Aretha Franklin; Preston Glass; Narada Michael Walden	Who's Zoomin' Who? (1985)	4:44
16.	"Until You Come Back to Me (That's What I'm Gonna Do)"	Clarence Paul; Stevie Wonder; Morris Broadnax	Let Me in Your Life (1974)	3:27
17.	"I Never Loved a Man (The Way I Love You)"	Ronnie Shannon	I Never Loved a Man the Way I Love You (1967)	2:51
18.	"Call Me"	Aretha Franklin	This Girl's in Love with You (1970)	3:56
19.	"Do Right Woman, Do Right Man"	Dan Penn; Chips Moman	I Never Loved a Man the Way I Love You (1967)	3:16
20.	"Bridge over Troubled Water"	Paul Simon	Aretha's Greatest Hits (1971)	5:33
Total length:				70:07

== Charts ==
Chart (2018)	Peak position
Canadian R&B Albums (Nielsen Soundscan)	22
US Billboard 200	49
US Top Album Sales (Billboard)	31
US Top Catalog Albums (Billboard)	2
US Top R&B Albums (Billboard)	4
US Top R&B/Hip-Hop Albums (Billboard)	25
