= Aretha Franklin: Live at Radio City Music Hall =

- Tour by Aretha Franklin
- Location: Manhattan, New York City,
- Venue: Radio City Music Hall
- Start date: 7 July 1989
- End date: 15 June 2014
- Legs: 16
- No. of shows: 16

Aretha Franklin: Live at Radio City Music Hall is a 2-night/3-night show. It was performed at Radio City Music Hall in New York City.

== Background ==
On July 6–7, 1989, Franklin began the show featuring 7 musicians, consisting of a full orchestra and band. It features Peabo Bryson.

On March & August 9 & 10, 1990, Franklin returned once again to feature her upcoming songs from her upcoming 1991 album.

On September 13–14, 1991, Franklin almost turned a concert into a fashion show.

On February 17–18, 2012, Franklin made a tribute to the late Whitney Houston.

On June 14–15, 2014, Franklin invited The Williams Brothers to perform with her. It was her last concert 4 years ago before her death.

== Track listing ==
=== Original release ===
July 6–7, 1989
No.	Title	Writer(s)	Length
1.	"Say That You Love Me Again"
2.	"Jumpin' Jack Flash"	Keith Richards, Mick Jagger
3.	"(You Make Me Feel Like) A Natural Woman"	Gerry Goffin, Carole King, Jerry Wexler
4.	"It's My Turn"	Carole Bayer Sager
5.	"I Never Loved a Man (The Way I Love You)"	Ronnie Shannon
6.	"Rock Steady"	Aretha Franklin
7.	"I Say a Little Prayer"	Burt Bacharach, Hal David
8.	"Chain of Fools"	Don Covay
9.	"Something He Can Feel"	Curtis Mayfield
10.	"Respect"	Otis Redding
11.	"I Knew You Were Waiting (For Me) (with Peabo Bryson)"	Simon Climie, Dennis Morgan
12.	"Tonight I Celebrate My Love (with Peabo Bryson)"	Gerry Goffin, Michael Masser
13.	"Try to Remember"	Tom Jones
14.	"Freeway of Love"	Jeffrey Cohen, Narada Michael Walden

March 3, August 9–10, 1990
No.	Title	Writer(s)	Length
1.	"Shine a Light (Rolling Stones song)"	Keith Richards, Mick Jagger
2.	"United Together"	Phil Perry, Chuck Jackson
3.	"(You Make Me Feel Like) A Natural Woman"	Gerry Goffin, Carole King, Jerry Wexler
4.	"Who's Zoomin' Who"	Aretha Franklin, Preston Glass, Narada Michael Walden
5.	"Until You Come Back to Me (That's What I'm Gonna Do)"	Morris Broadnax, Clarence Paul, Stevie Wonder
6.	"Spanish Harlem"	Jerry Leiber, Phil Spector
7.	"Angel"	Carolyn Franklin, Sonny Sanders
8.	"Respect"	Otis Redding
9.	"Everchanging Times"	Burt Bacharach, Bill Conti, Carole Bayer Sager
10.	"Someone Else's Eyes"	Burt Bacharach, Bruce Roberts, Carole Bayer Sager
11.	"Dr. Feelgood (Love Is a Serious Business)"	Aretha Franklin, Ted White
12.	"We Need Power"	TBA
13.	"Once Before I Go"	Peter Allen
14.	"I Dreamed a Dream"	Claude-Michel Schönberg

September 13–14, 1991
No.	Title	Writer(s)	Length
1.	"TBA"	TBA

May 1–2, 1993
No.	Title	Writer(s)	Length
1.	"TBA"	TBA

March 21–22, 2008
No.	Title	Writer(s)	Length
1.	"(Your Love Keeps Lifting Me) Higher and Higher"	Gary Jackson, Raynard Miner, Carl Smith
2.	"My Funny Valentine"	Richard Rodgers
3.	"Respect"	Otis Redding
4.	"Don't Play That Song (You Lied)"	Ahmet Ertegun, Betty Nelson
5.	"I Adore You"	TBA
6.	"Chain of Fools"	Don Covay
7.	"Moody's Mood for Love"	Dorothy Fields, Eddie Jefferson
8.	"Ain't No Way"	Carolyn Franklin
9.	"I Remember"	Keyshia Cole, Greg Curtis
10.	"Precious Memories"	John Wright
11.	"Easter Parade"	Irving Berlin

September 17–18, 2009
No.	Title	Writer(s)	Length
1.	"Respect"	Otis Redding
2.	"Sparkle"	Curtis Mayfield
3.	"Baby I Love You"	Ronnie Shannon
4.	"As If We Never Said Goodbye"	Andrew Lloyd Webber
5.	"Chain of Fools"	Don Covay
6.	"Ain't Nothing Like the Real Thing"	Ashford & Simpson
7.	"Day Dreaming"	Aretha Franklin
8.	"Think"	Aretha Franklin, Ted White
9.	"Call Me"	Aretha Franklin
10.	"Hooked on Your Love"	Curtis Mayfield
11.	"Ain't No Way"	Carolyn Franklin
12.	"One Night with the King"
13.	"Let Us Go Back to the Old Landmark"	W. Herbert Brewster
14.	"If You Believe"	Charlie Smalls

February 17–18, 2012
No.	Title	Writer(s)	Length
1.	"(Your Love Keeps Lifting Me) Higher and Higher"	Gary Jackson, Raynard Miner, Carl Smith
2.	"Sweet Bitter Love"
3.	"The House That Jack Built"	Bobby Lance, Fran Robbins
4.	"Something He Can Feel"	Curtis Mayfield
5.	"I Never Loved a Man (The Way I Love You)"	Ronnie Shannon
6.	"(You Make Me Feel Like) A Natural Woman"	Gerry Goffin, Carole King, Jerry Wexler
7.	"The Greatest Love of All"	Linda Creed
8.	"I Will Always Love You"	Dolly Parton
9.	"Bridge Over Troubled Water"	Paul Simon
10.	"Spirit in the Dark"	Aretha Franklin
11.	"Respect"	Otis Redding
12.	"Jump to It"	Luther Vandross, Marcus Miller
13.	"Chain of Fools"	Don Covay

June 14–15, 2014
No.	Title	Writer(s)	Length
1.	"(Your Love Keeps Lifting Me) Higher and Higher"	Gary Jackson, Raynard Miner, Carl Smith
2.	"I Say a Little Prayer"	Burt Bacharach, Hal David
3.	"Angel"	Carolyn Franklin, Sonny Sanders
4.	"I Never Loved a Man (The Way I Love You)"	Ronnie Shannon
5.	"Amazing Grace"	John Newton
6.	"It's My Turn"	Carole Bayer Sager, Michael Masser
7.	"I Will Always Love You"	Dolly Parton
8.	"It's About Time for a Miracle"	Beverly Crawford
9.	"Something He Can Feel"	Curtis Mayfield
10.	"Respect"	Otis Redding

== Personnel ==
- Aretha Franklin – vocals,
