= Respect (Aretha Franklin recording) =

Single by Aretha Franklin

from the album I Never Loved a Man the Way I Love You
- B-side: "Dr. Feelgood"
- Released: April 10, 1967
- Recorded: February 14, 1967
- Studio: Atlantic, New York City
- Genre: Soul; R&B
- Length: 2:29
- Label: Atlantic
- Songwriter: Otis Redding
- Producers: Jerry Wexler & Arif Mardin

Aretha Franklin singles chronology
"I Never Loved a Man (The Way I Love You)" (1967)	"Respect" (1967)	"Baby I Love You" (1967)

"Respect" is a song recorded by American singer Aretha Franklin. It is a cover of the original song written and recorded by Otis Redding, and which Franklin rearranged and reshaped to give the perspective of a woman as opposed to Redding's male perspective. The music in the two versions is significantly different, while a few changes in the lyrics resulted in different narratives around the theme of human dignity that have been interpreted as commentaries on gender roles, relationships and "respect". Franklin's rendition of the song was released on April 10, 1967, by Atlantic Records as the second single from her breakthrough debut Atlantic album I Never Loved a Man the Way I Love You.

Upon its release, the song became an immediate hit, reaching number one on the Billboard Hot 100, where it stayed for two weeks and won Franklin two Grammy Awards at the 1968 ceremony, including the first of eight consecutive Grammys for Best Female R&B Vocal Performance.

The song has since been held as a protest anthem, thanks to its connections to both the civil rights movement of the 1960s and the second-wave feminist movement of the 1970s. It has since been heralded as Franklin's signature song despite her celebrated career of hit singles spanning thirty years. In 1998, Franklin re-recorded the tune for addition to the film and soundtrack to Blues Brothers 2000. It is also the title of Franklin's estate-approved biopic, released in 2021 and starring Jennifer Hudson, who portrayed Franklin.

Considered one of the best R&B songs of its era, the song has made several best-of lists, including being ranked the greatest song of all time by Rolling Stone in 2021 and again in 2024, and the fourth greatest "protest song" of all time by the same publication in 2025. It was inducted into the Grammy Hall of Fame in 1987 and the Library of Congress' National Recording Registry in 2002. It was also included in the list of "Songs of the Century", by the Recording Industry of America and the National Endowment for the Arts.

== Background and recording ==
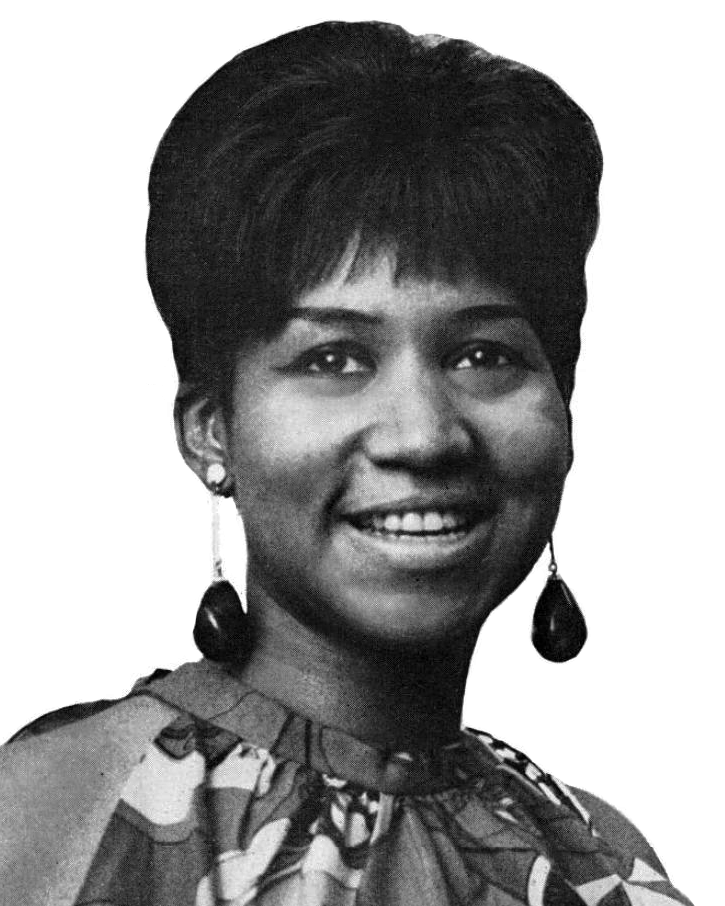
Franklin in 1967, the year of the recording of "Respect".

Aretha Franklin spent the first six years of her secular recording career under Columbia Records in between the ages of 18 and 24. None of her albums or singles under the label ever made the top ten of the major record charts, including Billboard and Cashbox, with only a cover of "Rock-a-Bye Your Baby with a Dixie Melody", becoming a moderate top 40 hit on the pop charts. By November 1966, her contract with the label expired despite the struggling performer owing the label money. Still, her contract was sold off to Atlantic Records that same month.

Not too long after Franklin signed, Atlantic began booking studio time for the singer. Noting that Franklin was being vocally held back on her Columbia recordings, producer Jerry Wexler stated his intention of having Franklin record more blues and gospel-inflected R&B music, which was by then was given the name "soul music". Franklin's first recording sessions were booked at FAME Studios in Alabama, recorded by engineer Tom Dowd beginning in January 1967. During what turned out to be Franklin's only session at FAME, Franklin and the Muscle Shoals Rhythm Section, affectionately known as the "Swampers", recorded the Ronnie Shannon composition, "I Never Loved a Man (The Way I Love You)".

Despite the successful session, the recording of the B-side, "Do Right Woman, Do Right Man", was abruptly canceled after Franklin's then-husband and manager Ted White got into a physical altercation with the studio's owner, resulting in Franklin and White abruptly returning to New York. According to Wexler, it took ten business days before Franklin called Wexler and asked to book a new session at Atlantic Recording Studios, instead of FAME. Wexler agreed and with Dowd and the Muscle Shoals musicians, in addition to her sisters Erma and Carolyn, Franklin recorded "Do Right Woman, Do Right Man". Not too long afterwards, Atlantic issued "I Never Loved a Man" as a single that February. It became Franklin's breakthrough hit on both the pop and R&B charts, reaching number nine on the Billboard Hot 100 and peaking at number one on the Top Selling R&B Singles chart, becoming her first of what would become 20 number one hits on the latter chart. The b-side, "Do Right Woman, Do Right Man", was received so well by R&B radio that it appeared on the chart, peaking at number 37.

Franklin entered Atlantic Recording Studios on Valentine's Day, February 14, 1967 to record yet another session on a song she had requested to cover called "Respect", a song that had originally been a hit for fellow soul singer Otis Redding back in 1965. Franklin had been a fan of the song and performed the song during live shows for a couple of years. Franklin had decided to flip the gender of the lyrics, with help from her sisters Erma and Carolyn. Franklin instructed the rhythm section how to perform her established arrangement of the "stop-and-stutter" syncopation, and in the studio she worked out new parts for the backing singers.

For the song's bridge, King Curtis' tenor saxophone soloed over the chords from Sam & Dave's song "When Something Is Wrong with My Baby". Franklin played piano for the number; in an interview, Spooner Oldham explained it was not uncommon for Franklin herself to play accompanying piano. The overall arrangement was by co-producer Arif Mardin, based on the ideas Franklin brought in. Said Mardin: "I have been in many studios in my life, but there was never a day like that. It was like a festival. Everything worked just right."

=== Analysis and subtext ===
According to Dobkin, Franklin's version was refashioned as a declaration from a strong, confident woman, who believes she has everything her man wants and does not wrong him, while demanding his "respect" – in the form of appropriate levels of physical attention. The repeated "sock it to me" line, sung by Franklin's sisters, was an idea that Carolyn and Aretha had worked out together; spelling out "R-E-S-P-E-C-T" was (according to engineer Tom Dowd) Carolyn's idea. The phrase "sock it to me" became a household expression. In an interview with WHYY's Fresh Air in 1999, Aretha said, "Some of the girls were saying that to the fellas, like 'sock it to me' in this way or 'sock it to me' in that way. It's not sexual. It was nonsexual, just a cliché line."

Franklin's version of the song contains the famous lines (as printed in the lyrics included in the 1985 compilation album Atlantic Soul Classics):

R-E-S-P-E-C-T
Find out what it means to me
R-E-S-P-E-C-T
Take care of... TCB

"TCB" is an abbreviation, commonly used in the 1960s and 1970s, meaning "taking care of business", African-American slang for pleasing one's partner. "TCB in a flash" later became Elvis Presley's motto and signature. "R-E-S-P-E-C-T" and "TCB" are not present in Redding's 1965 version, but he incorporated Franklin's ideas in his later performances with the Bar-Kays.

According to Detroit Free Press critic Brian McCollum, "Franklin's song has been dissected in books and academic papers, held up as a groundbreaking feminist and civil rights statement in an era when such declarations weren't always easy to make." When asked about her audacious stance amidst the feminist and Civil Rights Movement, Franklin told the Detroit Free Press, "I don't think it's bold at all. I think it's quite natural that we all want respect—and should get it."

== Release ==
=== Song launch ===
The song was featured as the opening track of Franklin's 1967 breakthrough Atlantic Records debut album, I Never Loved a Man the Way I Love You. As "I Never Loved a Man (The Way I Love You)" was making its peak inside the top ten of the Hot 100, Atlantic quickly released Franklin's rendition of "Respect" as a single to keep up demand on April 10, 1967, with the Franklin-composed "Dr. Feelgood (Love Is a Serious Business)" as the B-side, just weeks after Franklin's 25th birthday under the label number 2403. In the April 22, 1967 issue of Billboard, Jerry Wexler wrote a letter to distributors from Atlantic, stating "in response to overwhelming demand from dealers, one stops, DJ's and distributors, we are rush-releasing 'Respect' by Aretha Franklin from her hit Atlantic album, I Never Loved a Man The Way I Love You."

=== Critical reception ===
In its April 22, 1967 review of the single, Cashbox called the song a "frantic, driving, wailing, up-beat workout." On their April 22 issue, Billboard cited the song as a "Top 20 Pop Spotlight Single", writing that Franklin's rendition of "Respect" was a "driving revival... destined to follow the same successful groove [as 'I Never Loved a Man']."

=== Chart performance ===
"Respect" entered the Billboard Hot 100 on the week of April 29, 1967 at number 50, becoming the biggest debut of that week. In the following week (May 6), it rose to number 26, giving Franklin her third Top 40 entry and her second successive Top 40 single since joining Atlantic. In its third week, it rose to the Top 20 at number 14, subsequently entering the top five on May 20. On the week of June 3, it replaced the Rascals' "Groovin'" as the number one song in the country on the Billboard Hot 100, becoming Franklin's first chart-topper, staying for two weeks.

It repeated this success on the Top Selling R&B Singles chart, entering the chart at number 19 on the week of May 6. Just two weeks later for the week ending May 20, it replaced Martha and The Vandellas' "Jimmy Mack" as the number one R&B single of the country, where it would stay for eight consecutive weeks, making it Franklin's longest running number one single ever in her career. The song repeated this success on the Cashbox chart, where it peaked at number one on the Top 100 Singles chart in its June 3rd issue. The song also broke Franklin through internationally as well, peaking at number ten on the UK singles chart, while also reaching the top ten in Canada and the Netherlands, peaking inside the top 20 in Australia, Austria and Belgium while being moderately successful in West Germany and Italy.

== Legacy ==
=== Awards and accolades ===
For its year-end list, Billboard ranked the song the 13th biggest single of 1967, one of three songs by Franklin to make the list, with "Baby I Love You" at 59 and "I Never Loved a Man (The Way I Love You)" at number 75. The success of the song led to Franklin winning her first two Grammy Awards at the 1968 ceremony, winning Best Rhythm and Blues Recording and Best Female R&B Vocal Performance. It was notable as the last win in the former category and the first in the latter. This would end up being the first of what turned out to be eight consecutive Grammys in the category for Best Female R&B Vocal Performance, a streak that wouldn't end until the 1976 ceremony.

=== Cultural and social impact ===
According to NPR, "So much of what made 'Respect' a hit—and an anthem—came from Aretha Franklin's re-arrangement," including the Muscle Shoals musician's soulful guitar hook, the background vocals, and the added sax solo/chords. The changes in lyrics and production drove Franklin's version to become an anthem for the increasingly large Civil Rights and Women's Rights movements. She altered the lyrics to represent herself, a strong woman demanding respect from her man. Franklin's demands for "Respect" were "associated either with black freedom struggles or women's liberation."

Otis Redding himself was impressed with the performance of the song. At the Monterey Pop Festival in the summer of the cover's release, he was quoted playfully describing "Respect" as the song "that a girl took away from me, a friend of mine, this girl she just took this song". "When her hit single 'Respect' climbed the charts in July 1967, some fans declared that the summer of 1967 was 'the summer of 'Retha, Rap, and Revolt.'"

"Respect" has appeared in dozens of films and still receives consistent play on radio stations. In the 1970s, Franklin's version of the song came to exemplify the feminist movement. Producer Wexler said in a Rolling Stone interview, that Franklin's song was "global in its influence, with overtones of the civil-rights movement and gender equality. It was an appeal for dignity." Although she had numerous hits after "Respect", and several before its release, the song became Franklin's signature song and her best-known recording. I Never Loved a Man the Way I Love You was ranked eighty-third in Rolling Stone's "500 Greatest Albums of All Time" in 2003. A year later, "Respect" was fifth in the magazine's "500 Greatest Songs of All Time".

In 2021, when The 500 Greatest Songs Of All Time was updated again, Franklin's cover of "Respect" was moved up to number 1. Bob Dylan's song "Like A Rolling Stone", which was originally at number 1, is now listed at number 4. In 2025, the publication ranked Franklin's cover at number 4 on its list of "The 100 Best Protest Songs of All Time." In 2026, almost 60 years after its release, the song was included in Esquire's list of the "25 Most American Songs of All Time" with journalist Alan Light writing that the song would "forever be considered pop’s peak statement of female empowerment, expanding the concept of America as the 'land of the free.'" In June 2026, CBS News included the song in its list of the 250 essential American songs of the past 250 years.

=== Cover versions ===
Because Franklin made "Respect" a hit, many who sample or cover the song refer to her version rather than the original version by Otis Redding's. The Supremes and the Temptations were the two most successful acts signed to Berry Gordy Jr.'s Motown record label. Gordy decided to pair them up on a collaborative LP titled Diana Ross & the Supremes Join The Temptations. To accompany the release of the LP, Gordy organized a prime-time special TV program entitled TCB, a commonly used abbreviation for "Taking Care of Business". Among the songs performed on the program was a cover of Aretha Franklin's version of "Respect". The two groups took Franklin's message to new heights as the male versus female duet illustrated a battle in which each gender demanded their own respect. Additionally, the cover highlights the Supremes' own battle for racial equality. Much like Aretha Franklin, the Supremes’ rise to fame coincided with the civil rights movement, in which these women used their fame and status to assist the fight for racial equality. The Supremes were the Motown group which most successfully broke down racial boundaries within the popular music industry. They represented racial integration, black empowerment, and black womanhood, and their cover of "Respect" with the Temptations illustrates that.

Stevie Wonder also covered the song on his 1967 album I Was Made to Love Her.

Reba McEntire recorded her rendition for her self-titled album Reba in 1988. McEntire also performed the song at the CMA Awards the same year. A house music cover version with altered lyrics was released by American R&B singer Adeva in 1989, reaching No. 17 on the UK Singles Chart and was featured on her debut album. In 2012, Melanie Amaro recorded an uptempo version of the song for a Pepsi commercial alongside Elton John as a part of her prize for winning the first season of The X Factor. The single peaked at #3 on Billboard's Dance Club Songs chart and was #42 for the chart's year-end list in 2012.

== Personnel ==
- Aretha Franklin – lead vocals, piano
- Spooner Oldham – Hammond organ
- Chips Moman, Jimmy Johnson – guitar
- Tommy Cogbill – bass guitar
- Roger Hawkins – drums
- King Curtis – tenor saxophone
- Charles Chalmers – tenor saxophone
- Willie Bridges – baritone saxophone
- Melvin Lastie – cornet
- Carolyn Franklin – background vocals
- Erma Franklin – background vocals

Additional personnel

- Jerry Wexler and Arif Mardin – producers
- Tom Dowd – engineer
- Arif Mardin – arranger

== Charts ==
Chart (1967)	Peak position
Australia (Kent Music Report)	14
Austria (Ö3 Austria Top 40)	17
Belgium (Ultratop 50 Wallonia)	18
Canada Top Singles (RPM)	3
Italy (FIMI)	26
Netherlands (Single Top 100)	7
Scottish Singles Sales (Official Charts)	19
UK Singles (Official Charts)	10
US Billboard Hot 100	1
US Hot Rhythm & Blues Singles (Billboard)	1
West Germany (GfK)	23

Chart (2018)	Peak position
Ireland (IRMA)	75
Sweden Heatseeker (Sverigetopplistan)	1

== Certifications and sales ==
Region	Certification	Certified units/sales
Denmark (IFPI Danmark)	Gold	45,000^{‡}
France (SNEP)	Platinum	200,000^{‡}
Germany (BVMI)	Gold	300,000^{‡}
Italy (FIMI)	Platinum	100,000^{‡}
New Zealand (RMNZ)	2× Platinum	60,000^{‡}
Spain (Promusicae)	Platinum	60,000^{‡}
United Kingdom (BPI)	2× Platinum	1,200,000^{‡}
United States (RIAA)	Gold	1,000,000^{^}
^{^} Shipments figures based on certification alone.^{‡} Sales+streaming figures based on certification alone.
