= Tommy Cogbill =

American bassist, guitarist and record producer(1932–1982)

- Born: Thomas Clark Cogbill; April 8, 1932; Johnson Grove, Tennessee, U.S.
- Died: December 7, 1982 (aged 50) Nashville, Tennessee, U.S.
- Genres: Soul music, R&B, country music
- Occupations: Musician, songwriter, record producer
- Instruments: Bass guitar, guitar

Thomas Clark Cogbill (April 8, 1932 – December 7, 1982) was an American bassist, guitarist and record producer known for his work in R&B, soul and country music.

== Life and career ==
Cogbill was born in Johnson Grove, Tennessee. He was a highly sought-after session and studio musician who appeared on many now-classic recordings of the 1960s and 1970s, especially those recorded in Nashville, Memphis and Muscle Shoals. He has been credited as an influence by many bass guitarists, including Jerry Jemmott and Jaco Pastorius. In the late 1960s and early 1970s Cogbill worked as a record producer at American Sound Studio in Memphis and was part of the studio's house rhythm section, known as the Memphis Boys.

One of the best-known recordings featuring his bassline was Dusty Springfield's 1969 hit "Son of a Preacher Man", produced by Jerry Wexler and Tom Dowd. Other major artists he recorded with include King Curtis, Joe Tex, Elvis Presley, Aretha Franklin (Cogbill played the bassline on "Chain of Fools"), Dobie Gray, Kris Kristofferson, J. J. Cale, Wilson Pickett (Cogbill played the bassline on "Funky Broadway"), Chuck Berry, Dolly Parton, Bob Seger, and Neil Diamond. He also produced and played bass on King Curtis's single "Memphis Soul Stew" in 1967. He also produced and played bass on "Everlasting Love" by Carl Carlton, a hit in 1974.

Cogbill died of a stroke on December 7, 1982, in Nashville, aged 50.

== Discography, albums ==
- The Exciting Wilson Pickett, Wilson Pickett, 1966
- Wicked Pickett, Wilson Pickett, 1966
- The Sound of Wilson Pickett, Wilson Pickett, 1967
- I'm in Love, Wilson Pickett, 1968
- I Never Loved a Man the Way I Love You, Aretha Franklin, 1967
- Aretha Arrives, Aretha Franklin, 1967
- For Your Precious Love, Oscar Toney Jr., 1967
- Lady Soul, Aretha Franklin, 1968
- Aretha Now, Aretha Franklin, 1968
- Soul '69, Aretha Franklin, 1969
- From Elvis in Memphis, Elvis Presley, 1969
- From Memphis to Vegas/From Vegas to Memphis, Elvis Presley, 1969
- Dusty in Memphis, Dusty Springfield, 1969
- Memphis Underground, Herbie Mann, 1969
- Spills the Beans, Joe Tex, 1972
- Raised on Rock, Elvis Presley, 1973
- Good Times, Elvis Presley, 1974
- Seven, Bob Seger, 1974
- Michael Murphey, Michael Martin Murphey, 1974
- Okie, J. J. Cale, 1974
- Hey Dixie, Dobie Gray, 1974
- You and Me Together, James and Bobby Purify, 1975
- Easy as Pie, Bily "Crash" Craddock, 1976
- So Lonesome Tonight, Charlie Rich, 1977
- Crash, Bily "Crash" Craddock, 1977
- Starting All Over Again, Don Gibson, 1978
- Where to Now, Charlie Dore, 1979
- Slow Dancing, Ben Moore, 1979
- Hollywood, Tennessee, Crystal Gayle, 1981
- Billy Vera & the Beaters, Billy Vera & the Beaters, 1981

== Discography, songs ==
Song title	Title	Recording date	US charts	R&B charts	UK charts
Land of 1000 Dances	Wilson Pickett	May 11, 1966	6	1	22
Mustang Sally	Wilson Pickett	October 13, 1966	23	6	28
I Never Loved a Man (The Way I Love You)	Aretha Franklin	October 13, 1966	9	1	
Do Right Woman, Do Right Man	Aretha Franklin	January 24, 1967		37	
Funky Broadway	Wilson Pickett	February 1, 1967	8	1	43
Respect	Aretha Franklin	February 14, 1967	1	1	10
(You Make Me Feel Like) A Natural Woman	Aretha Franklin	February 17, 1967	8	2	
Baby I Love You	Aretha Franklin	1967	4	1	39
Chain of Fools	Aretha Franklin	July 8, 1967	2	1	1
I’m in Love	Wilson Pickett	July 1, 1967	45	4	
Memphis Soul Stew	King Curtis	July 5, 1967	33	6	
(Sweet Sweet Baby) Since You've Been Gone	Aretha Franklin	December 16, 1967	5	1	47
Think	Aretha Franklin	April 15, 1968	7	1	26
Suspicious Minds	Elvis Presley	January, 1969	1		
Soul Deep	The Box Tops	June 1969	18	-	22

== Collaborations ==
- The Exciting Wilson Pickett - Wilson Pickett (1966)
- The Wicked Pickett - Wilson Pickett (1967)
- I Never Loved a Man the Way I Love You - Aretha Franklin (1967)
- The Sound of Wilson Pickett - Wilson Pickett (1967)
- Aretha Arrives - Aretha Franklin (1967)
- I'm in Love - Wilson Pickett (1968)
- King Solomon - Solomon Burke (1968)
- Lady Soul - Aretha Franklin (1968)
- I Wish I Knew - Solomon Burke (1968)
- Aretha Now - Aretha Franklin (1968)
- Dusty in Memphis - Dusty Springfield (1969)
- Soul '69 - Aretha Franklin (1969)
- Soulful - Dionne Warwick (1969)
- Hey Now Hey (The Other Side of the Sky) - Aretha Franklin (1973)
- Giant of Rock 'n' Roll - Ronnie Hawkins (1974)
- Michael Murphey - Michael Martin Murphey (1974)
- Living and Dying in 3/4 Time - Jimmy Buffett (1974)
- Seven - Bob Seger (1974)
- A1A - Jimmy Buffett (1974)
- Okie - J. J. Cale (1974)
- Regeneration - Roy Orbison (1976)
- Troubadour - J. J. Cale (1976)
- When I Dream - Crystal Gayle (1978)
- Love Has No Reason - Debby Boone (1980)
- These Days - Crystal Gayle (1980)
- Shades - J. J. Cale (1981)
- Hollywood, Tennessee - Crystal Gayle (1981)
- Grasshopper - J. J. Cale (1982)
- True Love - Crystal Gayle (1982)
- Burlap & Satin - Dolly Parton (1983)

== See also ==
- Southern soul
- R&B
- Soul music
- Country
