= Take a Look (Aretha Franklin album) =

1967 compilation album by Aretha Franklin

Compilation album by Aretha Franklin
- Released: September 5, 1967
- Genre: Rhythm and blues
- Label: Columbia
- Producer: Robert Mersey

Aretha Franklin chronology
Aretha Arrives (1967)	Take a Look (1967)	Lady Soul (1968)

Take a Look is a compilation album by Aretha Franklin. It was released on September 5, 1967, by Columbia Records. In Europe this album was released by CBS Records, and was titled Soul, Soul, Soul.

JazzTimes noted, "Despite the label’s frequent and obvious lapses in judgment, Take a Look provides ample evidence that Columbia did indeed sign an artist who was destined for greatness."

== Track listing ==
Side one
No.	Title	Writer(s)	Length
1.	"Lee Cross"	Ted White
2.	"Operation Heartbreak"	Al Kasha, Alan Thomas, Curtis Williams
3.	"Bill Bailey, Won't You Please Come Home?"	Hughie Cannon
4.	"I'll Keep on Smiling"	Aretha Franklin
5.	"I Won't Cry Anymore"	Al Frisch, Fred Wise

Side two
No.	Title	Writer(s)	Length
1.	"Take a Look"	Aretha Franklin
2.	"Won't Be Long"	J. Leslie McFarland
3.	"Until You Were Gone"	Joy Byers
4.	"Blue Holiday"	Willie Denson, Luther Dixon
5.	"Follow Your Heart"	Van McCoy
