= Lady Soul =

1968 studio album by Aretha Franklin

Studio album by Aretha Franklin
- Released: January 22, 1968
- Recorded: February 16 – December 20, 1967
- Studio: FAME Studios
- Genres: R&B; soul
- Length: 29:51
- Label: Atlantic (SD 8176)
- Producer: Jerry Wexler

Aretha Franklin chronology
Take a Look (1967)	Lady Soul (1968)	Aretha Now (1968)

Singles from Lady Soul
- 1. "(You Make Me Feel Like) A Natural Woman" Released: September 1967; 2. "Chain of Fools" Released: November 1967; 3. "(Sweet Sweet Baby) Since You've Been Gone"/"Ain't No Way" Released: March 1968

Professional ratings
Review scores
Source	Rating
AllMusic	5/5 stars
The Encyclopedia of Popular Music	5/5 stars
Q	5/5 stars
The Rolling Stone Album Guide	5/5 stars

Lady Soul is the twelfth studio album by American singer Aretha Franklin, released on January 22, 1968, by Atlantic Records. The album stayed at #1 for sixteen weeks on Billboard's R&B album chart, and it hit number 2 on the pop album chart (underneath Paul Mauriat) during a year-long run.

== Background ==
Lady Soul was Franklin's third R&B chart-topper and reached number two on the Billboard 200, tying with I Never Loved a Man the Way I Love You for her highest-charting album on the pop chart. The album also included some of her biggest hit singles: "Chain of Fools" (number 2 Pop), and "(You Make Me Feel Like) A Natural Woman" (number 8 Pop), and "(Sweet Sweet Baby) Since You've Been Gone" (number 5 Pop). It sold more than a million copies in the United States. The album was reissued on Rhino Records in a deluxe edition in 1995.

Gospel/R&B singer Cissy Houston (mother of Whitney Houston) and her group the Sweet Inspirations are credited as background vocals on several tracks, along with Aretha's sisters Carolyn Franklin and Erma Franklin. Eric Clapton, at the time a member of the band Cream, is credited as the guitarist on the track "Good to Me as I Am to You".

Lady Soul peaked at number 1, number 2 and number 3 on Billboard's Black Albums, Pop Albums and Jazz Albums charts respectively. The single "Ain't No Way" – B-Side of "(Sweet, Sweet, Baby) Since You've Been Gone" – peaked at number 9 on the Black Singles chart and number 16 on the Pop Singles chart.

== Legacy ==
The album was included in the book 1001 Albums You Must Hear Before You Die.

In 2003, the TV network VH1 named Lady Soul the 41st greatest album of all time. In 2003 and 2012, it ranked at number 85 on Rolling Stone's list "The 500 Greatest Albums of All Time". It rose to number 75 in a 2020 reboot of the list. The album was rated the 29th best album of the 1960s by Pitchfork.

== Track listing ==
All tracks produced by Jerry Wexler with Tom Dowd as and recording engineer.

A Side
No.	Title	Writer(s)	Length
1.	"Chain of Fools"	Don Covay	2:46
2.	"Money Won't Change You"	James Brown; Nat Jones	2:08
3.	"People Get Ready"	Curtis Mayfield	3:42
4.	"Niki Hoeky"	Jim Ford; Lolly Vegas; Pat Vegas	2:31
5.	"(You Make Me Feel Like) A Natural Woman"	Gerry Goffin; Carole King; Jerry Wexler	2:44

B Side
No.	Title	Writer(s)	Length
1.	"(Sweet Sweet Baby) Since You've Been Gone"	Aretha Franklin; Ted White	2:25
2.	"Good to Me As I Am To You"	Franklin; White	3:56
3.	"Come Back Baby"	Walter Davis	2:25
4.	"Groovin'"	Felix Cavaliere; Eddie Brigati	2:57
5.	"Ain't No Way"	Carolyn Franklin	4:17

CD reissue bonus tracks
No.	Title	Writer(s)	Length
1.	"Chain of Fools" (Unedited Version)	Covay	4:22
2.	"(You Make Me Feel Like) A Natural Woman" (Mono Single Version)	Goffin; King; Wexler	2:49
3.	"Since You've Been Gone (Sweet Sweet Baby)" (Mono Single Version)	Franklin; White	2:49
4.	"Ain't No Way" (Mono Single Version)	Carolyn Franklin	4:12

Notes

- Chain of Fools (Unedited Version) was originally issued on the 1973 compilation album The Best of Aretha Franklin.

== Charts ==
Chart (1968)	Peak position
U.S. Billboard Top Pop Albums	2
U.S. Billboard Top Soul Albums	1
U.S. Billboard Top Jazz Albums	3

== Singles ==
Year released	Title	US Pop	US R&B
September 7, 1967 (Atlantic single #2441)	"You Make Me Feel Like A (Natural Woman)"	8	2
November 22, 1967 (Atlantic single #2464)	"Chain of Fools"	2	1
February 9, 1968 (Atlantic single #2486)	"Since You've Been Gone (Sweet Sweet Baby)"	5	1
February 9, 1968 (Atlantic single #2486)	"Ain't No Way"	16	8

Note: Numbers in italic (following original single release information) denote peak positions on Billboard's "Top/Best Selling R&B Singles" and "Hot 100" charts respectively – courtesy BPI Communications and Joel Whitburn's Record Research Publications.

== Personnel ==
- Aretha Franklin – vocals, backing vocals, piano
- Eric Clapton, Jimmy Johnson, Joe South, Bobby Womack – guitar
- Tommy Cogbill – bass guitar
- Gene Chrisman, Roger Hawkins – drums
- Warren Smith – vibraphone
- Spooner Oldham – keyboards, electric piano, organ
- Bernie Glow, Joe Newman, Melvin Lastie – trumpet
- Tony Studd – trombone
- King Curtis – tenor saxophone
- Frank Wess, Seldon Powell – flute, tenor saxophone
- Haywood Henry – baritone saxophone
- The Sweet Inspirations – backing vocals
- Carolyn Franklin – backing vocals
- Cissy Houston – backing vocals

== See also ==
- List of number-one R&B albums of 1968 (U.S.)
