= (Sweet Sweet Baby) Since You've Been Gone =

1968 single by Aretha Franklin

Single by Aretha Franklin

from the album Lady Soul
- B-side: "Ain't No Way"
- Released: March 1968
- Genre: Soul
- Length: 2:25
- Label: Atlantic
- Songwriters: Aretha Franklin, Teddy White
- Producer: Jerry Wexler

Aretha Franklin singles chronology
| "(I Can't Get No) Satisfaction" (1968) | "(Sweet Sweet Baby) Since You've Been Gone" (1968) | "Think" (1968) |

"(Sweet Sweet Baby) Since You've Been Gone" is a song by singer Aretha Franklin. Released as a single from her Lady Soul album in 1968, the song was successful, debuting at number 31 and peaking at number 5 on the Billboard Hot 100 for five weeks, and spending three weeks at number 1 on the Hot Rhythm & Blues Singles chart. The B-side, "Ain't No Way", was also a hit, peaking at number 16 on the Hot 100 and number 9 on the Hot Rhythm & Blues Singles chart.

Cash Box called the song a "powerhouse of vocal energy and tingling ork backup to build another emotional blockbuster."

A live recording was featured on the 1968 album Aretha in Paris.

The song was co-written by Franklin and her then husband Ted White.

== Personnel ==
- Aretha Franklin - lead vocals
- Jimmy Johnson and Bobby Womack - guitars
- Spooner Oldham - Fender Rhodes electric piano
- Tommy Cogbill - bass guitar
- Roger Hawkins - drums
- Melvin Lastie, Joe Newman, Bernie Glow - trumpets
- Tony Studd - bass trombone
- King Curtis, Seldon Powell, Frank Wess - tenor saxophones
- Haywood Henry - baritone saxophone
- The Sweet Inspirations, Carolyn Franklin & Erma Franklin - background vocals
- horn arrangement: Arif Mardin

== Covers ==
Gary Puckett & The Union Gap released a version of the song on their 1968 album, Young Girl.

Ramsey Lewis recorded an instrumental version on his 1968 album, Maiden Voyage. His version did see #100 in Canada.

Kate Ceberano released a version of the song on her 1989 album, Brave.

Whitney Houston performed the song in a tribute to Franklin on her 1997 HBO special, Classic Whitney Live from Washington, D.C.. The song was included in a medley with Franklin's "Baby I Love You" and "Ain't No Way".

== Chart positions ==
| Charts | Peak position |
|---|---|
| U.S. Billboard Hot 100 | 5 |
| U.S. Billboard Hot Rhythm & Blues | 1 |
| CAN RPM Top 100 | 6 |
