= The Best of Aretha Franklin =

1973 compilation album by Aretha Franklin

Compilation album by Aretha Franklin
- Released: 1973
- Recorded: 1967–1971
- Genres: R&B, soul
- Label: Atlantic
- Producer: Tom Dowd

Aretha Franklin chronology
Hey Now Hey (The Other Side of the Sky) (1973)	The Best of Aretha Franklin (1973)	Let Me in Your Life (1974)

The Best of Aretha Franklin is a 1973 compilation by Aretha Franklin. It contains alternate takes and is one of only a few quadraphonic releases. It was reissued on DVD-Audio by Rhino Handmade in August 2010. It is not to be confused with a 1984 compilation of the same name.

== Track listing ==
1. "Respect" - 2:24
2. "Baby, I Love You" - 2:46
3. "Chain of Fools" - 4:22
  - an alternate version exclusive to this compilation
4. "Rock Steady" - 4:19
  - contains an alternate introduction exclusive to this compilation
5. "Spanish Harlem" - 3:40
6. "Don't Play That Song" - 2:48
7. "Dr. Feelgood" - 3:18
8. "Day Dreaming" - 3:49
9. "I Say A Little Prayer" - 3:22
10. "(You Make Me Feel Like) A Natural Woman" - 2:43
11. "Call Me" - 3:24
12. "Bridge over Troubled Water" - 5:30
