= Take It Like You Give It =

1967 studio album by Aretha Franklin

Studio album by Aretha Franklin
- Released: April 4, 1967
- Genre: Soul, R&B
- Length: 26:42
- Label: Columbia
- Producer: Bob Johnston, Bobby Scott, Clyde Otis, Robert Mersey

Aretha Franklin chronology
I Never Loved a Man the Way I Love You (1967)	Take It Like You Give It (1967)	Aretha Arrives (1967)

Singles from Take It Like You Give It
- 1. "Tighten Up Your Tie, Button Up Your Jacket (Make It for the Door)" Released: February 1966; 2. "Lee Cross" Released: 1967

Take It Like You Give It is the tenth studio album by American singer Aretha Franklin. The album was released in April 4, 1967 by Columbia Records.

== Background ==
Due to her worsening relations with Columbia Records in late 1966, this was the last album of Franklin's on the label to only feature previously unreleased songs.

== Track listing ==
Side One

1. "Why Was I Born?" (Oscar Hammerstein II, Jerome Kern) – 2:52
2. "I May Never Get to Heaven" (Buddy Killen, Bill Anderson) – 3:27
3. "Tighten Up Your Tie, Button Up Your Jacket (Make It Easy for the Door)" (Billy Dawn Smith) – 1:58
4. "Her Little Heart Went to Loveland" (Buddy Kaye, Philip Springer) – 2:34
5. "Lee Cross" (Ted White) – 2:53
6. "Take It Like You Give It" (Aretha Franklin) – 1:50

Side Two

1. "Only the One You Love" (Eddie Snyder, Charles Singleton) – 2:23
2. "Deeper" (Rudy Clark) – 2:03
3. "Remember Me" (Van McCoy, Clyde Otis) – 2:12
4. "Land of Dreams" (Aretha Franklin) – 2:12
5. "A Little Bit of Soul" (Milton Bland, McKinley Mitchell, David Wilkinson) – 2:18

== Personnel ==
- Robert Mersey – conductor on "Why Was I Born?", "Tighten Up Your Tie, Button Up Your Jacket (Make It for the Door)" and "Lee Cross", producer on "Lee Cross"
- Belford Hendricks – conductor on "Land of Dreams" and "A Little Bit of Soul"
- Bob Johnston – producer on "Why Was I Born?" and "Tighten Up Your Tie, Button Up Your Jacket (Make It for the Door)"
- Bobby Scott – producer on "I May Never Get to Heaven"
- Clyde Otis – producer on tracks A4, A6, B1 to B5
- Vernon Smith – cover photography
