= Chain of Fools =

Single by Aretha Franklin

from the album Lady Soul
- B-side: "Prove It"
- Released: November 1967
- Studio: FAME Studios (Muscle Shoals)
- Genre: R&B, soul, rock
- Length: 4:03 (original recording); 2:47 (edit)
- Label: Atlantic
- Songwriter: Don Covay
- Producer: Jerry Wexler

Aretha Franklin singles chronology
"(You Make Me Feel Like) A Natural Woman" (1967)	"Chain of Fools" (1967)	"(I Can't Get No) Satisfaction" (1968)

"Chain of Fools" is a song written by Don Covay. Aretha Franklin first released the song as a single in 1967, which hit number one on the Billboard Hot Rhythm & Blues chart and number two on the Billboard Hot 100. It later appeared on her 1968 album Lady Soul.

== History ==
When asked by Atlantic Records producer Jerry Wexler to write songs for Otis Redding, Don Covay recorded a demo of "Chain of Fools", a song he had written in his youth while singing gospel with his brothers and sisters. After listening to the demo, Wexler chose to give the song to Aretha Franklin rather than Redding.

The song was edited down from 4:03 to 2:47 for the original Lady Soul LP & 45 rpm single; the original long version first appeared on the quadraphonic LP The Best of Aretha Franklin in 1973, and later on the 1995 remaster of Lady Soul on Rhino Records.

== Reception ==
Cash Box magazine said that the song was "a smashing entry that will top both blues and pop charts" with "heavy rhythmic push, and an overwhelming vocal impact."

The single reached number one on the U.S. R&B chart, staying there for four weeks. "Chain of Fools" also peaked at number two on the Billboard Hot 100, behind "Judy in Disguise (With Glasses)" by John Fred & His Playboy Band. It won the Grammy Award for Best Female R&B Vocal Performance, and later a Grammy Hall of Fame Award. In 2004, it was ranked #249 on Rolling Stone's list of The 500 Greatest Songs of All Time. The tremolo guitar in the song's introduction was played by Joe South.

Live recordings have appeared on the albums Aretha in Paris (1968) and VH1 Divas Live (1998, with Mariah Carey).

== Personnel ==
- Aretha Franklin – lead vocals, piano
- Jimmy Johnson, Joe South – electric guitar
- Spooner Oldham – Wurlitzer electronic piano
- Tommy Cogbill – bass guitar
- Roger Hawkins – drums
- The Sweet Inspirations, Carolyn Franklin, Erma Franklin, Ellie Greenwich – background vocals

== Charts ==
Chart (1967–68)	Peak position
Canada RPM Top 100	4
UK Singles Chart	37
US Billboard Hot 100	2
US Billboard Hot Rhythm & Blues	1
US Cash Box Top 100	1

== Notable cover versions ==
- In 1969, Finnish jazz singer Carola tried out rhythm & blues, recording a television video of "Chain of Fools". The tongue-in-cheek choreography by Heikki Värtsi included girl group dancing and Carola whipping a man in a cave.
- Cynthia Erivo and Jennifer Hudson each covered the song as Aretha Franklin, respectively, for the miniseries Genius: Aretha (2021) and the biographical film Respect (2021).

== Uses in pop culture ==
Tomika (Maryam Hassan) sings an excerpt from the song in the 2003 film School of Rock.
