= Operation Heartbreak =

Single by Aretha Franklin
- A-side: "Rock-a-Bye Your Baby with a Dixie Melody"
- Released: September 1961
- Genre: Soul
- Length: 3:03
- Label: Columbia Records 42157
- Songwriter(s): Al Kasha, Alan Thomas, Curtis Williams

Aretha Franklin singles chronology
"Are You Sure" (1961)	"Operation Heartbreak" (1961)	"I Surrender, Dear" (1962)

"Operation Heartbreak" is a song written by Al Kasha, Alan Thomas, and Curtis Williams and performed by Aretha Franklin. The song reached #6 on the U.S. R&B chart in 1961.

The song's A-side, "Rock-a-Bye Your Baby with a Dixie Melody", reached #37 on the Billboard Hot 100.

== Chart performance ==
=== Aretha Franklin ===
Chart	Peak position
U.S. R&B chart	6
