= Aretha Arrives =

1967 studio album by Aretha Franklin

Studio album by Aretha Franklin
- Released: August 4, 1967
- Recorded: June 20–23, 1967
- Studio: Atlantic Studios, (New York City, New York)
- Genre: Deep soul; Southern soul; R&B; soul
- Length: 36:30
- Label: Atlantic, Rhino
- Producer: Jerry Wexler

Aretha Franklin chronology
Take It Like You Give It (1967)	Aretha Arrives (1967)	Take a Look (1967)

Singles from Aretha Arrives
- 1. "Baby I Love You" Released: July 1, 1967; 2. "(I Can't Get No) Satisfaction" Released: 1968

Professional ratings
Review scores
Source	Rating
AllMusic	3/5 stars
The Encyclopedia of Popular Music	4/5 stars

Aretha Arrives is the eleventh studio album by American singer Aretha Franklin. The album was released on August 4, 1967 by Atlantic Records. Its first single release was "Baby I Love You", a million-selling Gold 45, which hit #1 R&B and #4 on the Billboard Hot 100, followed by her cover version of The Rolling Stones' "(I Can't Get No) Satisfaction" in 1968. This was her second album for Atlantic. The sessions for the album were delayed because Franklin shattered her elbow in an accident during a Southern tour. She decided she was ready to record before her doctor thought she was ready. While she still did not have full mobility, she provided piano accompaniment on the slower songs and played with her left hand only on "You Are My Sunshine". In 2024, the song Prove It from the album was sampled by Canadian rapper Drake on his single The Heart Part 6.

It eventually sold approximately 400,000 copies in the United States.

== Reception ==
After the album's release, Rolling Stone stated: "...neither the sophistication nor the subtlety of the musicians involved gets in the way of the basic primitivism of Aretha's music. The best cuts on the record hit with tremendous immediacy and force, and do so in an entirely artistic way. The only hang-ups are the occasional reliance on unnecessary gimmicks, and the weakness of some of the material."

In 2004, Q ranked the album at number 1 in its list of "20 Forgettable Follow-Ups to Big Albums".

== Track listing ==
Side one
No.	Title	Writer(s)	Length
1.	"Satisfaction"	Mick Jagger, Keith Richards	2:35
2.	"You Are My Sunshine"	Jimmie Davis, Charles Mitchell	4:18
3.	"Never Let Me Go"	Joe Scott	2:50
4.	"96 Tears"	Rudy Martinez	2:12
5.	"Prove It"	Randy Evretts, Horace Ott	2:58
6.	"Night Life"	Willie Nelson, Walt Breeland, Paul Buskirk	3:10

Side two
No.	Title	Writer(s)	Length
7.	"That's Life"	Dean Kay, Kelly Gordon	4:25
8.	"I Wonder"	Cecil Gant, Raymond Leveen	4:21
9.	"Ain't Nobody (Gonna Turn Me Around)"	Carolyn Franklin	2:31
10.	"Going Down Slow"	St. Louis Jimmy Oden	4:27
11.	"Baby, I Love You"	Ronnie Shannon	2:39

== Personnel ==
- Aretha Franklin – vocals, piano
- Jimmy Johnson, Joe South – guitar
- Tommy Cogbill – bass guitar
- Roger Hawkins – drums
- Teddy Sommer – vibraphone
- Spooner Oldham, Truman Thomas – piano, organ, electric piano
- Charles Chalmers, King Curtis – tenor saxophone
- Tony Studd – bass trombone
- Melvin Lastie – trumpet
- Gene Orloff – director of string section
- The Sweet Inspirations – background vocals on "Ain't Nobody"
- Aretha, Carolyn and Erma Franklin – background vocals on "You Are My Sunshine", "96 Tears", "That's Life" and "Baby I Love You"
- Ralph Burns – string and French horn arrangements
- Arif Mardin, Tom Dowd – recording engineer, arrangements

== See also ==
- List of number-one R&B albums of 1967 (U.S.)
