= Ain't No Way =

1968 single by Aretha Franklin

Single by Aretha Franklin

from the album Lady Soul
- A-side: "(Sweet Sweet Baby) Since You've Been Gone"
- Released: March 1968
- Recorded: 1967
- Genre: Soul
- Length: 4:12
- Label: Atlantic
- Songwriter: Carolyn Franklin
- Producer: Jerry Wexler

Aretha Franklin singles chronology
"(I Can't Get No) Satisfaction" (1968)	"Ain't No Way" (1968)	"Think" (1968)

"Ain't No Way" is a song written by singer-songwriter Carolyn Franklin and sung by her elder sister Aretha Franklin as the B-side to her 1968 hit, "(Sweet Sweet Baby) Since You've Been Gone". This song should not be confused with a different song of the same title, recorded by Aretha Franklin on her 2003 CD So Damn Happy: "Ain't No Way" by Barry J. Eastmond and Gordon Chambers.

== History ==
Written by Carolyn Franklin, the song was recorded by her sister Aretha and featured on her acclaimed 1968 Lady Soul album. Released as the B-side of her top-five hit single, "(Sweet Sweet Baby) Since You've Been Gone", the song peaked at number 16 on the Billboard Hot 100 and number 9 on the Hot R&B Singles Chart in 1968. Carolyn and members of the Sweet Inspirations performed backing vocals on the track. The Sweet Inspirations' founder Cissy Houston showcased her operatic upper range during Franklin's bridges and the ending of the track.

== Covers ==
- In 1974, Shirley Brown recorded an outtake cover of the track in her album Woman to Woman.
- In 1983, Whitney Houston made her world debut on The Merv Griffin Show singing the tune with mother Cissy Houston. Whitney performed the track several times during her 1994 U.S. Bodyguard World Tour. In 1997, she performed it live on her 1997 HBO special, Classic Whitney Live from Washington, D.C., and the 1999 VH-1 Divas Live special as a duet with Mary J. Blige.
- In 1988, singer Jean Carn covered the song for her album You're a Part of Me.
- In 1991, Cheryl Pepsii Riley scored a top 50 US R&B hot with a version produced by Full Force taken from her album Chapters.
- In 2005, Mary J. Blige covered the track as a duet with Patti LaBelle on LaBelle's Classic Moments album, with their version peaking at number 18 on the R&B charts. LaBelle had previously performed the song in tribute to Franklin twice in 1994, at the Essence Awards and the Kennedy Center Honors.
- Christina Aguilera performed the song in 2011 to great acclaim in a tribute to Aretha Franklin during the 53rd Grammy Awards.
- Amber Riley, who portrays Mercedes Jones in TV series Glee, covered the song in 2011 for the show's season 2 episode 17 ”A Night of Neglect”.
- In 2011, Joe Bonamassa and Beth Hart covered the song in their collaborative album, Don't Explain.
- In 2013, singer Sasha Allen performed the song in the U.S. TV series The Voice.
- In December 2017, singer Demi Lovato covered the song for Spotify Singles.
- In 2017, British group Corners sampled the song in their track of the same name on their debut album, Corners.
- In 2018, singer Ledisi covered the song as a tribute at the BLACK GIRLS ROCK! awards.
- For the television special Aretha! A GRAMMY Celebration for the Queen of Soul, Jennifer Hudson, who was chosen by Franklin to portray her in her biopic, performed the song to widespread acclaim as part of a medley including "Respect" and "Think".
- Cynthia Erivo covered the song for the BBC Proms 2022.

== Credits ==
- Lead vocal and piano by Aretha Franklin
- Background vocals by the Sweet Inspirations and Carolyn Franklin
- Additional background vocals by Cissy Houston
- Produced by Jerry Wexler

== Charts ==
Charts (1968)	Peak position
U.S. Billboard Hot 100	16
U.S. Billboard Hot Rhythm & Blues	9
