= I Never Loved a Man the Way I Love You =

1967 studio album by Aretha Franklin

Studio album by Aretha Franklin
- Released: March 10, 1967
- Recorded: January 10 – February 26, 1967
- Studios: FAME Studios, Muscle Shoals, Alabama; Atlantic Recording Studios, New York City, New York
- Genre: Southern soul
- Length: 32:51
- Label: Atlantic
- Producer: Jerry Wexler

Aretha Franklin chronology
Soul Sister (1966)	I Never Loved a Man the Way I Love You (1967)	Take It Like You Give It (1967)

Singles from I Never Loved a Man the Way I Love You
- 1. "I Never Loved a Man (The Way I Love You)" Released: February 10, 1967; 2. "Respect" Released: April 11, 1967 (Charted on April 29)

I Never Loved a Man the Way I Love You is the ninth studio album by American singer Aretha Franklin, released on March 10, 1967, by Atlantic Records. It was Franklin's first release under her contract with the label, following her departure from Columbia Records after eight unsuccessful jazz standard albums, and marked a commercial breakthrough for her, becoming her first top 10 album in the United States, reaching number 2 on the Billboard 200. Two singles were released to promote the album: "Respect" (an Otis Redding cover) and "I Never Loved a Man (The Way I Love You)". The former topped the Billboard Hot 100, while the latter reached the top 10.

Although initially released to a mixed critical response, the album was eventually widely reappraised and is now regarded as one of the greatest and most influential albums of all time, being included in Rolling Stone's "The 500 Greatest Albums of All Time" list, in which it was ranked at number 13 in the 2020 iteration, as well as in the book 1001 Albums You Must Hear Before You Die. Franklin's cover of "Respect" became her signature song and was ranked by Rolling Stone as the greatest song of all time in 2021.

== Recording and production ==
"Respect"
Aretha Franklin version of Otis Redding's "Respect" from I Never Loved a Man the Way I Love You

I Never Loved a Man the Way I Love You is Aretha's first album with Atlantic Records. The title track was recorded at FAME Studios in Muscle Shoals, Alabama. After an altercation broke out between Franklin's then husband, Ted White, trumpeter Ken Laxton and FAME studios owner/producer Rick Hall, producer Jerry Wexler arranged to continue recording the LP at Atlantic Studios, New York. The B-side, "Do Right Woman, Do Right Man", was unfinished at FAME studios as the session ended abruptly. Members of the Muscle Shoals rhythm section were flown to New York to complete "Do Right Woman" and a number of other tracks (including "Respect"). There was a discrepancy in the tape-recording speeds of the two studios. The foundation track of "Do Right Woman" recorded at Muscle Shoals and the later tracks added at Atlantic's New York studio are slightly out of tune with each other: Producer Chips Moman regretted that the piano was faintly sharp.

== Reception and legacy ==
Professional ratings
Review scores
Source	Rating
AllMusic	5/5 stars
The Rolling Stone Album Guide	5/5 stars
Robert Christgau	A

The record spent several weeks at number 2 on the main Billboard album chart and 14 weeks at number 1 in the magazine's Top R&B Albums chart. It was certified Gold by the RIAA in 1967, eventually selling nearly two million. It was voted number 352 in the third edition of Colin Larkin's All Time Top 1000 Albums (2000). In 2003, it was ranked number 83 on Rolling Stone magazine's 2003 list of the 500 greatest albums of all time, 84 in a 2012 revised list and 13 in the 2020 edition. The album was also included in both the 1001 Albums You Must Hear Before You Die (2010) and 1,000 Recordings to Hear Before You Die (2008). When Rolling Stone listed the "Women in Rock: 50 Essential Albums" in 2002 and again 2012, the album was named at number one. The album included two top-10 singles: "Respect" was a number-1 single on Billboard's Hot 100 Pop singles chart, and "I Never Loved a Man (The Way I Love You)" peaked at number 9. The album was rated the 10th best album of the 1960s by Pitchfork.

In 1967, Rolling Stone chided the album for "the lack of versatility on the part of the sidemen. The drums weren't hard enough, the guitar was weak, and the production lacked polish." In 2002, though, they placed the album at number 1 on their "Women in Rock: 50 Essential Albums" list. Music critic Robert Christgau, gave the album an A, stating that "Not all of the tracks sound inspired" but also that it was the best album she had made up until that point. Q included the album on their list of the "100 Greatest Albums Ever". Q also gave the album 4 stars and said "[the album] came out in May 1967 and was number 2 in America within weeks ... now it stands untainted by time. She seemed so much a force of nature it's strange to recall that this was actually her tenth album ..."

In the obituary for Aretha Franklin, Rolling Stone made this comment about I Never Loved a Man the Way I Love You: "It puts the emphasis not just on the great songs, or the amazing music, but on the person speaking them, her world, her story and whatever journey she's on in life. It rings out like revealed truth happening in real time, a declaration of independence."

In June 2026, CBS News included Dr. Feelgood (Love Is a Serious Business) in the album in its list of the 250 essential American songs of the past 250 years.

== Track listing ==
Side one
No.	Title	Writer(s)	Length
1.	"Respect"	Otis Redding	2:29
2.	"Drown in My Own Tears"	Henry Glover	4:07
3.	"I Never Loved a Man (The Way I Love You)"	Ronnie Shannon	2:51
4.	"Soul Serenade"	Curtis Ousley, Luther Dixon	2:39
5.	"Don't Let Me Lose This Dream"	Aretha Franklin, Ted White	2:23
6.	"Baby, Baby, Baby"	Aretha Franklin, Carolyn Franklin	2:54

Side two
No.	Title	Writer(s)	Length
7.	"Dr. Feelgood (Love Is a Serious Business)"	Aretha Franklin, Ted White	3:23
8.	"Good Times"	Sam Cooke	2:10
9.	"Do Right Woman, Do Right Man"	Dan Penn, Chips Moman	3:16
10.	"Save Me"	Aretha Franklin, Carolyn Franklin, Curtis Ousley	2:21
11.	"A Change Is Gonna Come"	Sam Cooke	4:20

1995 reissue bonus tracks
No.	Title	Writer(s)	Length
12.	"Respect" (stereo version)	Otis Redding	2:28
13.	"I Never Loved a Man (The Way I Love You)" (stereo version)	Ronnie Shannon	2:47
14.	"Do Right Woman, Do Right Man" (stereo version)	Dan Penn, Chips Moman	3:14

== Personnel ==
=== Musicians ===
- Aretha Franklin – piano, vocals
- Spooner Oldham – keyboards
- Jimmy Johnson, Chips Moman – guitar
- Tommy Cogbill – bass guitar
- Gene Chrisman, Roger Hawkins – drums
- Melvin Lastie – trumpet
- Charles Chalmers, King Curtis – tenor saxophone
- Willie Bridges – baritone saxophone
- Carolyn Franklin – background vocals
- Erma Franklin – background vocals
- Cissy Houston – background vocals

=== Technical ===
- Title track produced by Rick Hall (FAME Studios, Muscle Shoals, AL), Remaining tracks Jerry Wexler (Atlantic Recording Studios, New York, NY)
- Tom Dowd – arranger, recording engineer
- Arif Mardin – recording engineer
- Loring Eutemey – cover design
- Jerry Schatzberg – cover photography

== Charts ==
Chart performance for I Never Loved a Man the Way I Love You
Chart (1967)	Peak position
UK Albums (Official Charts)	36
US Billboard 200	2
US Top R&B/Hip-Hop Albums (Billboard)	1

== See also ==
- Album era
- List of number-one R&B albums of 1967 (U.S.)
