= I Never Loved a Man (The Way I Love You) =

Single by Aretha Franklin

from the album I Never Loved a Man the Way I Love You
- B-side: "Do Right Woman, Do Right Man"
- Released: February 10, 1967
- Recorded: January 24, 1967
- Studio: FAME Studios (Muscle Shoals, AL)
- Genre: Soul; blues; gospel
- Length: 2:51
- Label: Atlantic
- Songwriter: Ronnie Shannon
- Producer: Jerry Wexler

Aretha Franklin singles chronology
"Mockingbird" (1966)	"I Never Loved a Man (The Way I Love You)" (1967)	"Respect" (1967)

Official music audio
- "I Never Loved a Man (The Way I Love You)" on YouTube

"I Never Loved a Man (The Way I Love You)" is a 1967 single released by American soul singer Aretha Franklin. Released on Atlantic Records as the first big hit of her career and the lead single from her ninth studio album of the same name, it became a defining song for Franklin, peaking at number one on the rhythm and blues charts and number nine on the pop charts. The B-side was "Do Right Woman, Do Right Man". Before this Franklin had placed only two Top 40 singles on the pop chart during her modest tenure with Columbia Records.

== Background and recording ==
Aretha Franklin had made eight albums while under contract to Columbia Records but had remained commercially unsuccessful. When Columbia Records let Franklin's contract lapse in 1966, Atlantic Records producer Jerry Wexler quickly signed her, taking her in January 1967 to Muscle Shoals, Alabama, along with recording engineer Tom Dowd and Franklin's then-husband Ted White. Wexler had arranged for Chips Moman and Tommy Cogbill from Stax to join the Muscle Shoals Rhythm Section at Rick Hall's FAME Studios. Musicians on the record included Ken Laxton on trumpet, King Curtis and Charles Chalmers on tenor saxophone, Willie Bridges on baritone saxophone, Spooner Oldham on Wurlitzer electronic piano, Chips Moman and Jimmy Johnson on guitar, Tommy Cogbill on bass guitar, and Roger Hawkins on drums.

The first song they worked on was one that Franklin had brought with her, written by Ronnie Shannon. A previously unreleased demo version of the song was included as the opening track on the 2007 album Rare & Unreleased Recordings from the Golden Reign of the Queen of Soul.

After signing Franklin, Wexler requested her to record a blues song. Franklin later says of her Atlantic tenure that "they just told me to sit on the piano and sing". From the very first chord that Aretha played on the piano, it was clear to everyone that it was a magic moment. It was at that point that Spooner Oldham, who had been hired to play piano, stepped aside to play the electric piano. Within minutes of Franklin's recording, Wexler knew he had a hit.

The FAME session was later disrupted by a fight between Ted White and trumpeter Ken Laxton, leaving the B-side, "Do Right Woman, Do Right Man" unfinished. Wexler recorded more songs with Franklin in Atlantic's New York City studio, with some members of the Muscle Shoals Rhythm Section flown in to complete "Do Right Woman" and a number of other tracks (including "Respect"). There was a slight discrepancy in the tape recording speed of the Muscle Shoals FAME studio and the Atlantic's New York studio recorders. The foundation track of "Do Right Woman" recorded at Muscle Shoals and the subsequent tracks added at Atlantic's New York studio are very slightly out of tune with each other.

== Reception ==
Billboard described "I Never Loved a Man" as "a powerful blues wailer that will create much excitement in both pop and r&b markets." It rose to number 9 on the Billboard Hot 100 and became Franklin's first number one hit on the R&B chart. It was also the title of Franklin's first Atlantic LP. Franklin would soon become a superstar after the release of this song. The song has since been called a pivotal moment in rock and roll. It ranked number 189 on Rolling Stone's list of the 500 Greatest Songs of All Time. In 2009, the 1967 recording on Atlantic Records was inducted into the Grammy Hall of Fame.

== Personnel ==
=== Musicians ===
Source (album credits):

- Aretha Franklin – piano, vocals
- Spooner Oldham – keyboards
- Jimmy Johnson, Chips Moman – guitar
- Tommy Cogbill – bass guitar
- Gene Chrisman, Roger Hawkins – drums
- Melvin Lastie – trumpet
- Charles Chalmers, King Curtis – tenor saxophone
- Willie Bridges – baritone saxophone
- Carolyn Franklin – background vocals
- Erma Franklin – background vocals
- Cissy Houston – background vocals

=== Technical ===
- Produced by Rick Hall (FAME Studios, Muscle Shoals, AL)
- Tom Dowd – arranger, recording engineer
- Arif Mardin – recording engineer

== Legacy ==
The creation of the song is related in the 2005 BBC Two documentary series Soul Deep, including interviews with the original personnel including Franklin, Shannon (demonstrating the central riff on electric piano), and Wexler.

Swedish pop group Roxette included the song in their MTV Unplugged show, in 1993. The song was later covered by Aerosmith as "Never Loved a Girl" on 2004's Honkin' on Bobo a collection of old blues and R&B songs. The song has also been performed on American Idol by contestants Sabrina Sloan in season 6 and Alexis Grace in season 8. Both performances received much acclaim. Grammy Award winners Alicia Keys, Kelly Clarkson, Spencer Wiggins and Jennifer Hudson have also covered the song.

There are a number of renditions of this song on YouTube including Franklin performing it on the Lady Soul special from 1968. A live recording featured on the album Aretha in Paris (1968).

The song was sung by Maria Doyle in the 1991 Alan Parker film The Commitments, and appeared on the film's soundtrack album; it was also featured in the 1996 movie Bound. It also featured in the 1995 movie Major Payne, and the 2007 movie This Christmas, starring Loretta Devine

Garth Brooks recorded the song for the 2013 'Blue-Eyed Soul' album in the Blame It All on My Roots: Five Decades of Influences compilation.

== Chart positions ==
Charts	Peak position
R&B Singles Chart	1
Billboard Hot 100	9

== See also ==
- Muscle Shoals
- Muscle Shoals Rhythm Section
- FAME Studios

== Sources ==
- Dobkin, Matt (Jan 24, 2006). I Never Loved a Man The Way I Love You. Macmillan. ISBN 978-0-31231-829-1.
