= Ted White (music manager) =

American businessman, songwriter, and producer (1931–2020)

- Born: Theodore Richard White; March 25, 1931; Pensacola, Florida, U.S.
- Died: October 26, 2020 (aged 89); Detroit, Michigan, U.S.
- Occupations: Music manager; songwriter; producer; businessman
- Years active: 1960s–1970s
- Spouse: Aretha Franklin (m. 1961; div. 1969)
- Children: 1

Theodore Richard White (March 25, 1931 – October 26, 2020) was an American businessman, songwriter, music manager, and producer from Detroit, Michigan.

White was the manager and first husband of soul singer Aretha Franklin. As a songwriter, White wrote or co-wrote songs for Franklin, including "I Wonder (Where You Are Tonight)", "Lee Cross", "Dr. Feelgood", and "Think".

== Life and career ==
White was born in Pensacola, Florida, on March 25, 1931. He was described in 1968 as a dabbler in Detroit real estate and wheeler-dealer. He owned a chain of jukeboxes. White described himself as a sandlot promoter before he took over managing the career of singer Aretha Franklin in 1961.

White was introduced to Franklin by singer Della Reese at the Twenty Grand Club in Detroit. White had actually seen Franklin the first time at a party held at her house in 1954. After a few weeks of dating, they were married by a justice of the peace while touring Ohio in 1961, when Franklin was 19 and White was 30. Franklin's father, C.L. Franklin, opposed the union. White was described as a pimp by Motown producer Harvey Fuqua.

In 1964, White formed the record label Ston-Roc and produced the single "Talking About the People" / "Don't Ever Leave Me" by Tony & Tyrone. That year, Franklin recorded "Lee Cross" written by White, but it was released as a single by singer Walter Jackson instead. Franklin's version wasn't released until the album Take It Like You Give It in 1967. By that time, Franklin had parted ways with her first label Columbia Records and White negotiated a deal with Atlantic Records. White and Franklin co-wrote "Dr. Feelgood" and "Don't Let Me Lose This Dream" from her 1967 album I Never Loved a Man the Way I Love You, both of which have been covered by various artists. They also co-wrote a few songs from her albums Lady Soul (1968) and Aretha Now (1968) before their separation.

After White and Franklin separated in 1968, her brother, Cecil Franklin, took over managing her career. White was abusive during their marriage, having abused Franklin publicly at Atlanta's Regency Hyatt House Hotel. Gospel singer Mahalia Jackson said the Regency incident was not the first in which White was violent toward Franklin. Violence between White and Franklin was not unusual. In December 1969, White shot Charles Cook, younger brother of musician Sam Cooke, in the groin at Franklin's Detroit home during Cook's visit with Franklin. White and Franklin's divorce was finalized in 1969.

=== Ted White Jr. ===
White and Franklin had one son, Ted "Teddy" White Jr., born in February 1964. After the divorce, Teddy was raised by his father's family in Oak Park, Michigan. He spent holidays and weekends with his mother in Detroit. He played guitar for his mother before becoming a singer-songwriter, under the name Teddy Richards.

=== Death and in pop culture ===
White died on October 26, 2020, in Detroit, Michigan, aged 89. White was portrayed by Malcolm Barrett in the third season of the anthology series Genius, and by Marlon Wayans in the 2021 Aretha Franklin biopic Respect.

== Songwriting credits ==
- 1963: Aretha Franklin – "I Wonder (Where You Are Tonight)"
- 1964: Aretha Franklin – "Lee Cross"
- 1967: Aretha Franklin – "Dr. Feelgood"
- 1967: Aretha Franklin – "Don't Let Me Lose This Dream"
- 1968: Aretha Franklin – "Think"
- 1968: Aretha Franklin – "Good To Me As I Am To You"
- 1968: Aretha Franklin – "(Sweet Sweet Baby) Since You've Been Gone"
