= Do Right Woman, Do Right Man =

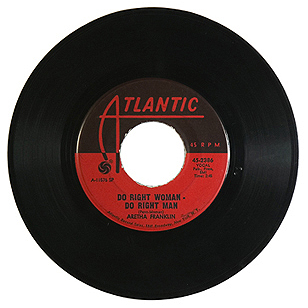

Single by Aretha Franklin

from the album I Never Loved a Man the Way I Love You
- A-side: "I Never Loved a Man (The Way I Love You)"
- Released: February 10, 1967
- Recorded: 1967
- Genre: Soul
- Length: 3:14
- Label: Atlantic
- Songwriters: Chips Moman; Dan Penn
- Producer: Jerry Wexler

Aretha Franklin singles chronology
"Mockingbird" (1967)	"Do Right Woman, Do Right Man" (1967)	"Respect" (1967)

"Do Right Woman, Do Right Man" (also written "Do Right Woman — Do Right Man") is a song written by Chips Moman and Dan Penn, and made famous by Aretha Franklin. Her version was released on February 10, 1967. Rolling Stone listed it as number 476 in their list of the 500 Greatest Songs of All Time.

== Production ==
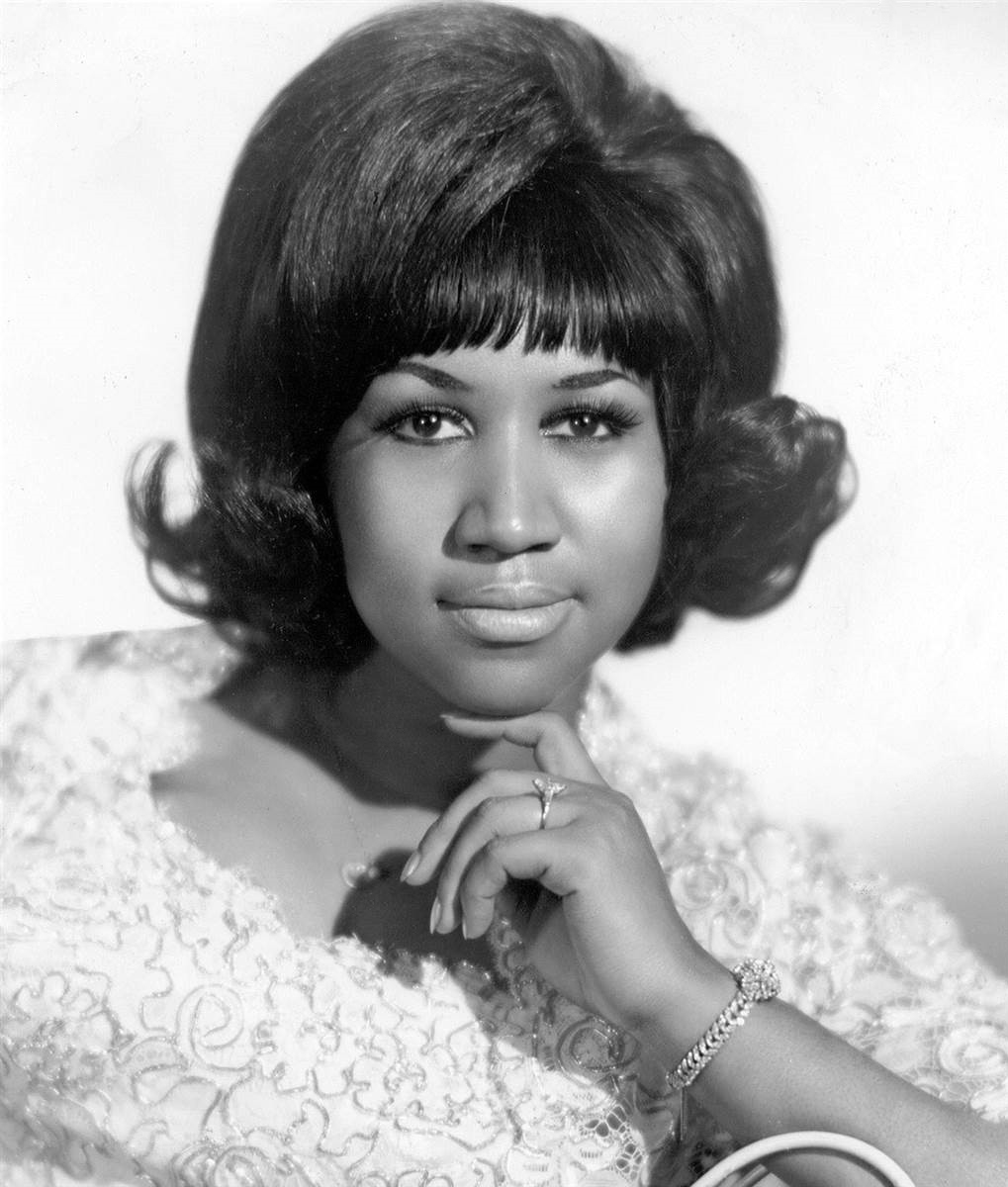
Franklin (pictured in 1968) disappeared for weeks while recording

"Do Right Woman, Do Right Man" was written by Chips Moman and Dan Penn. It was produced by Jerry Wexler.

Franklin began recording the song in 1967 at Rick Hall's FAME Studios in Muscle Shoals, Alabama, after completing "I Never Loved a Man (The Way I Love You)". During the session, Franklin's then-husband and manager Ted White got upset over something trumpeter Ken Laxton said, and at the motel afterwards Rick Hall's attempt to explain things resulted in a fight between him and White. The following morning, it was found that Franklin and White had left with the song still unfinished. Penn recalled:

"They cut 'I Never Loved a Man' and it was just romping stomping. It was an out and out smash. They cut 'Do Right Woman', it didn't sound right. She wouldn't even sing it. I think I sang it as it went down on the track. . . . They weren't going to cut any more at Rick Hall's because they had a little disagreement, and they had an eight-track in New York and wanted to go eight-track, so we all went up there."

I Never Loved a Man the Way I Love You was also recorded at FAME in the same session but after the altercation started by Ted White, producer Jerry Wexler decided to complete recording of the LP in New York. Franklin disappeared for several weeks according to one source, later reappearing in New York City. She then finished the song with the help of her sisters Carolyn and Erma. Penn recalled:

"She had put her sisters on it, she'd sang it over, she'd played piano herself, and I realised then you can make anything out of anything with a lot of tracks. I think maybe they had the bass drum and a snare and the bass that they used out of Alabama, and possibly the guitar. . . . And it was such a wonderful record when they played it back. It's still one of the best records I've ever heard by anybody – not 'cause it's my song, but just that record. It'll reach out and get you in your heart."

== Composition ==
At the beginning of the song, Franklin sings with a gospel-inspired tone, which continues through the bridge. Through overdubbing, Franklin plays both the piano and the organ.

According to Bill Janovitz of Allmusic, "Do Right Woman, Do Right Man" contrasts the power of temptation and rewards of fidelity. He notes that its melody is "soothing". Patricia Hill Collins writes that it has a feminist message, urging African-American men to respect women as their equals and not follow the then-common belief that it is "a man's world" by using or abusing them; she also writes that the song urges men to be loyal, responsible, and "sexually expressive".

Although the song is originally heavily inspired by soul, covers have different styles. For example, The Flying Burrito Brothers cover in 1969 was a "country-soul waltz".

== Critical reception ==
"Do Right Woman, Do Right Man" was the B-side recording of Franklin's single "I Never Loved a Man (The Way I Love You)" (No. 9 on the US Billboard 100), but it never charted by itself on pop charts in the US, Canada, or the UK. It did, however, rise to No. 37 on the US R&B chart. The song was included on Franklin's album I Never Loved a Man the Way I Love You.

Wexler called the song "perfection". In 2004, Rolling Stone selected "Do Right Woman, Do Right Man" as one of the 500 Greatest Songs of All Time at 473th. As of the 2010 edition, it is ranked 476th.

In the 1991 film Cape Fear, Max Cady (Robert De Niro) tries to seduce a teenage girl (Juliette Lewis) while dancing with her to the song.

The song was also featured in the 1995 film Dead Presidents.

== Covers ==
From Allmusic.

- Cher
- Dionne Warwick
- Joan Baez
- Etta James
- The Sweet Inspirations
- The Flying Burrito Brothers, featuring David Crosby on high harmony
- Barbara Mandrell, whose version went to number 17 on the country chart, 1971.
- Willie Nelson
- Dan Penn
- Kitty Wells
- Joe Cocker
- The Commitments
- Joe Tex
- Elkie Brooks
- Phoebe Snow
- William Bell
- Martina McBride
- Sinéad O'Connor
- The Three Degrees
- The Revelators
- Whitney Houston
- Delaney and Bonnie
- George Lewis
- Truckasaurus including Lisa Miller
