= Baby I Love You (Aretha Franklin song) =

Single by Aretha Franklin

from the album Aretha Arrives
- B-side: "Going Down Slow"
- Released: July 1, 1967
- Studio: Atlantic Studios (New York, NY)
- Genre: Rock; soul
- Length: 2:44
- Label: Atlantic
- Songwriter: Ronnie Shannon
- Producer: Jerry Wexler

Aretha Franklin singles chronology
"Respect" (1967)	"Baby I Love You" (1967)	"(You Make Me Feel Like) A Natural Woman" (1967)

"Baby I Love You" is a popular song by R&B singer Aretha Franklin. The only single release from her Aretha Arrives album in 1967, the song was a huge hit, peaking at number 4 on the Billboard Hot 100 Singles chart and spending two weeks at number-one on the Hot Rhythm & Blues Singles chart. In the UK, the song rose to number 39 in August 1967, spending four weeks on the chart. It was featured in Martin Scorsese's 1990 film Goodfellas. A live performance appears on the album Aretha in Paris (1968).

Georgian songwriter Ronnie Shannon, newly arrived in Detroit, met Franklin's husband and manager Ted White by chance at a barbershop. White requested Shannon write some songs specifically for Franklin. Shannon delivered "I Never Loved a Man (The Way I Love You)" and "Baby I Love You"—two tremendous successes.

Billboard described the single as a "driving rocker" that is "brought to life in this electric performance by Miss Franklin."

== Chart positions ==
Chart (1967)	Peak position
US Billboard Hot 100	4
US Hot R&B/Hip-Hop Songs (Billboard)	1
US Cashbox Top 100	3

== Covers ==
"Baby I Love You" has been covered by others, including Roberta Flack and Donny Hathaway.
