= Queen of Soul: The Atlantic Recordings =

1992 box set by Aretha Franklin

Box set by Aretha Franklin
- Released: September 29, 1992
- Recorded: 1967–1976
- Genres: Soul; rhythm and blues
- Length: 298:42
- Label: Atlantic/Rhino
- Producer: Various

Aretha Franklin chronology
What You See Is What You Sweat (1991)	Queen of Soul: The Atlantic Recordings (1992)	Greatest Hits: 1980–1994 (1994)

2014 Rhino Records cover

Professional ratings
Review scores
Source	Rating
AllMusic	(1992)
AllMusic	(2014)
Baltimore Sun	4/4 stars
Encyclopedia of Popular Music	5/5 stars
Entertainment Weekly	A
NME	10/10
The Rolling Stone Album Guide	5/5 stars
The Village Voice	(Positive)

Queen of Soul: The Atlantic Recordings is an 86-track, four-disc box set detailing Aretha Franklin's Atlantic career, starting in 1967 with the landmark single "I Never Loved a Man (The Way I Love You)" and ending with 1976's "Something He Can Feel".

== Background ==
The set highlights Franklin's best moments and give a depth that is essential to the Queen's and soul music fans, but does not include any tracks recorded by Aretha for Atlantic after 1977. The liner notes include essays written for the box set by producers Jerry Wexler, Arif Mardin, and Tom Dowd, as well as contributors Ahmet Ertegun, Dave Marsh, David Ritz, and Thulani Davis. The album won a Grammy Award for Best Album Notes at the 35th Annual Grammy Awards, the first win in the category by a woman (Davis).

This release by Atlantic Records should not be confused with the February 2014 release by Rhino Records entitled The Queen of Soul. Both are 4-CD compilations. They share 75 tracks. The Atlantic release, however, contains 11 tracks not on the Rhino release, and the Rhino release has an additional 12 tracks not found on the Atlantic release.

As of 2003, sales in the United States have exceeded 72,000 copies, according to Nielsen SoundScan.

== Track listing ==
=== 1992 Atlantic Records release ===
Volume One
No.	Title	From album	Length
1.	"I Never Loved a Man (The Way I Love You)"	I Never Loved a Man the Way I Love You
2.	"Do Right Woman, Do Right Man"	I Never Loved a Man the Way I Love You
3.	"Save Me"	I Never Loved a Man the Way I Love You
4.	"Respect"	I Never Loved a Man the Way I Love You
5.	"Baby, Baby, Baby"	I Never Loved a Man the Way I Love You
6.	"Dr. Feelgood (Love Is a Serious Business)"	I Never Loved a Man the Way I Love You
7.	"(You Make Me Feel Like) A Natural Woman"	Lady Soul
8.	"Soul Serenade"	I Never Loved a Man the Way I Love You
9.	"Drown in My Own Tears"	I Never Loved a Man the Way I Love You
10.	"Chain of Fools"	Lady Soul
11.	"Baby, I Love You"	Aretha Arrives
12.	"Ain't Nobody (Gonna Turn Me Around)"	Aretha Arrives
13.	"(Sweet Sweet Baby) Since You've Been Gone"	Lady Soul
14.	"You Are My Sunshine"	Aretha Arrives
15.	"Going Down Slow"	Aretha Arrives
16.	"Never Let Me Go"	Aretha Arrives
17.	"I Wonder"	Aretha Arrives
18.	"Prove It"	Aretha Arrives
19.	"Good Times"	I Never Loved a Man the Way I Love You
20.	"Come Back Baby"	Lady Soul
21.	"A Change"	Aretha Now
22.	"You're a Sweet Sweet Man"	Aretha Now
23.	"Good to Me as I Am to You"	Lady Soul
24.	"People Get Ready"	Lady Soul
25.	"Ain't No Way"	Lady Soul

Volume Two
No.	Title	From album	Length
1.	"Think"	Aretha Now
2.	"See Saw"	Aretha Now
3.	"The House That Jack Built"	non album single (#45-2546)
4.	"Night Time Is the Right Time"	Aretha Now
5.	"I Say a Little Prayer"	Aretha Now
6.	"You Send Me"	Aretha Now
7.	"My Song"	B-side to "See Saw"
8.	"I Take What I Want"	Aretha Now
9.	"I Can't See Myself Leaving You"	Aretha Now
10.	"Night Life" (Live, 1968)	Aretha In Paris
11.	"Today I Sing the Blues"	Soul '69
12.	"Pitiful"	Soul '69
13.	"Tracks of My Tears"	Soul '69
14.	"River's Invitation"	Soul '69
15.	"Share Your Love with Me"	This Girl's in Love with You
16.	"It Ain't Fair"	This Girl's in Love with You
17.	"Sit Down and Cry"	This Girl's in Love with You
18.	"Honest I Do"	Spirit in the Dark
19.	"The Weight"	This Girl's in Love with You
20.	"When the Battle Is Over"	Spirit in the Dark
21.	"Eleanor Rigby"	This Girl's in Love with You
22.	"One Way Ticket"	Spirit in the Dark
23.	"Call Me"	This Girl's in Love with You
24.	"Pullin'"	Spirit in the Dark

Volume Three
No.	Title	From album	Length
1.	"Son of a Preacher Man"	This Girl's in Love with You
2.	"Try Matty's"	Spirit in the Dark
3.	"The Thrill Is Gone (From Yesterday's Kiss)"	Spirit in the Dark
4.	"Dark End of the Street"	This Girl's in Love with You
5.	"You and Me"	Spirit in the Dark
6.	"Let It Be"	This Girl's in Love with You
7.	"Spirit in the Dark"	Spirit in the Dark
8.	"Why I Sing the Blues"	Spirit in the Dark
9.	"Don't Play That Song (You Lied)"	Spirit in the Dark
10.	"Young, Gifted and Black"	Young, Gifted and Black
11.	"Border Song (Holy Moses)"	Young, Gifted and Black
12.	"A Brand New Me"	Young, Gifted and Black
13.	"You're All I Need to Get By"	non-album single
14.	"Spanish Harlem"	non-album single
15.	"Rock Steady"	Young, Gifted and Black
16.	"Oh Me Oh My (I'm a Fool for You Baby)"	Young, Gifted and Black
17.	"Day Dreaming"	Young, Gifted and Black
18.	"All the King's Horses"	Young, Gifted and Black
19.	"Bridge Over Troubled Water"	non-album single
20.	"Angel"	Hey Now Hey (The Other Side of the Sky)

Volume Four
No.	Title	From album	Length
1.	"Spirit in the Dark" (Reprise with Ray Charles)	Aretha Live at Fillmore West
2.	"How I Got Over"	Amazing Grace
3.	"So Swell When You're Well"	Hey Now Hey (The Other Side of the Sky)
4.	"Master of Eyes (The Deepness of Your Eyes)"	Hey Now Hey (The Other Side of the Sky)
5.	"Somewhere"	Hey Now Hey (The Other Side of the Sky)
6.	"I'm in Love"	Let Me in Your Life
7.	"Ain't Nothing Like the Real Thing"	Let Me in Your Life
8.	"Until You Come Back to Me (That's What I'm Gonna Do)"	Let Me in Your Life
9.	"Every Natural Thing"	Let Me in Your Life
10.	"Without Love"	With Everything I Feel in Me
11.	"With Everything I Feel in Me"	With Everything I Feel in Me
12.	"Mr. D.J. (5 for the D.J.)"	You
13.	"Look Into Your Heart"	Sparkle
14.	"Sparkle"	Sparkle
15.	"Rock with Me"	Sparkle
16.	"Break It to Me Gently"	Sweet Passion
17.	"Something He Can Feel"	Sparkle

=== 2014 Rhino Records release ===
Disc 1

1. "I Never Loved a Man (The Way I Love You)"
2. "Do Right Woman, Do Right Man"
3. "Respect"
4. "Drown in My Own Tears"
5. "Soul Serenade"
6. "Don't Let Me Lose This Dream"
7. "Baby, Baby, Baby"
8. "Dr. Feelgood (Love Is a Serious Business)"
9. "Good Times"
10. "Save Me"
11. "Baby, I Love You"
12. "Satisfaction"
13. "You Are My Sunshine"
14. "Never Let Me Go"
15. "Prove It"
16. "I Wonder"
17. "Ain't Nobody (Gonna Turn Me Around)"
18. "It Was You" (Aretha Arrives outtake)
19. "(You Make Me Feel Like) A Natural Woman"
20. "Chain of Fools"
21. "People Get Ready"
22. "Come Back Baby"
23. "Good to Me as I Am to You"
24. "(Sweet Sweet Baby) Since You've Been Gone"
25. "Ain't No Way"

Disc 2

1. "Think"
2. "You Send Me"
3. "I Say a Little Prayer"
4. "The House That Jack Built"
5. "You're a Sweet Sweet Man"
6. "I Take What I Want"
7. "A Change"
8. "See Saw"
9. "My Song"
10. "I Can't See Myself Leaving You"
11. "Night Life" (live)
12. "Ramblin'"
13. "Today I Sing the Blues"
14. "River's Invitation"
15. "Pitiful"
16. "Talk to Me, Talk to Me" (Soul '69 outtake)
17. "Tracks of My Tears"
18. "The Weight"
19. "Share Your Love with Me"
20. "Pledging My Love / The Clock"
21. "It Ain't Fair"
22. "Sit Down and Cry"
23. "Let It Be"
24. "Eleanor Rigby"
25. "Call Me"

Disc 3

1. "Son of a Preacher Man"
2. "Try Matty's"
3. "The Thrill Is Gone (From Yesterday's Kiss)"
4. "Dark End of the Street"
5. "You and Me"
6. "You're Taking Up Another Man's Place" (Spirit in the Dark outtake)
7. "Don't Play That Song"
8. "Why I Sing the Blues"
9. "Spirit in the Dark"
10. "My Way" (Spirit in the Dark outtake)
11. "One Way Ticket"
12. "Pullin'"
13. "Border Song (Holy Moses)"
14. "A Brand New Me"
15. "You're All I Need to Get By"
16. "Bridge Over Troubled Water"
17. "Spanish Harlem"
18. "Lean on Me"
19. "Spirit in the Dark" (Reprise With Ray Charles) (Live, 1971)

Disc 4

1. "Rock Steady"
2. "Young, Gifted and Black"
3. "All the King's Horses"
4. "Oh Me Oh My (I'm a Fool for You Baby)"
5. "Day Dreaming"
6. "Mary, Don't You Weep" (Live, 1972) – with James Cleveland & The Southern California Community Choir
7. "Climbing Higher Mountains" (Live, 1972) – with James Cleveland & The Southern California Community Choir
8. "Precious Memories" (Live, 1972) – with James Cleveland & The Southern California Community Choir
9. "Master of Eyes (The Deepness of Your Eyes)"
10. "Angel"
11. "Somewhere"
12. "So Swell When You're Well"
13. "I'm in Love"
14. "Ain't Nothing Like the Real Thing"
15. "Until You Come Back to Me (That's What I'm Gonna Do)"
16. "Look Into Your Heart"
17. "Sparkle"
18. "Something He Can Feel"

== Certifications ==
Region	Certification	Certified units/sales
Australia (ARIA)	Gold	35,000^{^}
^{^} Shipments figures based on certification alone.
