= The Atlantic Singles Collection 1967–1970 =

Compilation album by Aretha Franklin
- Released: September 28, 2018
- Recorded: January 1967 – August 1970
- Genre: Soul
- Length: 104:31
- Label: Rhino
- Producer: Nigel Reeve

Aretha Franklin chronology
A Brand New Me (2017)	The Atlantic Singles Collection 1967–1970 (2018)	The Queen of Soul (2018)

Professional ratings
Review scores
Source	Rating
PopMatters	10/10

The Atlantic Singles Collection 1967–1970 is a compilation album of singer Aretha Franklin, released by Rhino Records in September 2018 six weeks after Franklin's death. The album contains her first 17 singles for Atlantic Records released in the United States from her debut for the label "I Never Loved a Man (The Way I Love You)" of February 1967 through "Border Song (Holy Moses)" of October 1970. The Amazon sales website identifies these as digitally remastered versions of the original mono issues, although that is not indicated in the set's liner notes or packaging. The original recordings were produced by Jerry Wexler, at times in collaboration with Tom Dowd and Arif Mardin.

== Content ==
Most of these singles, both A- and B-sides, appeared on the Atlantic Records albums released by Franklin during the same years. Some singles were released ahead of those albums, with others appearing on the market after the album. All 17 A-sides made the top 40 on the Billboard Hot 100, while the first eight all charted in the top ten including her chart-topping signature song, "Respect". Six B-sides also made the Billboard chart independently, with her version of "I Say a Little Prayer" also making the top ten. Missing is her 1968 version of "(I Can't Get No) Satisfaction" released as a single in the United Kingdom only.

These singles are arguably the greatest work of Franklin's career. Of the 34 tracks on this set, seven appear on the Billboard list of her ten greatest songs, 16 appear on the Rolling Stone list of Franklin's greatest 50 songs, while half of the tally for Franklin's 20 essential songs according to The New York Times appear on this set.

Most tracks were recorded at Atlantic Studios in New York City with session musicians from FAME Studios in Muscle Shoals, Alabama. Franklin's initial session for Atlantic took place at the FAME Studios in Muscle Shoals, and two additional sessions took place at Criteria Studios in Miami. The Dixie Flyers credit refers to the musicians at the Criteria sessions.

== Track listing ==
=== Disc one ===
No.	Title	Writer(s)	Length
1.	"I Never Loved a Man (The Way I Love You)" (Atlantic 2386 Billboard No. 9)	Ronnie Shannon	2:47
2.	"Do Right Woman, Do Right Man" (Atlantic 2386b)	Chips Moman, Dan Penn	2:45
3.	"Respect" (Atlantic 2403 Billboard No. 1)	Otis Redding	2:26
4.	"Dr. Feelgood" (Atlantic 2403b)	Aretha Franklin, Ted White	3:18
5.	"Baby I Love You" (Atlantic 2427 Billboard No. 4)	Ronnie Shannon	2:40
6.	"Going Down Slow" (Atlantic 2427b)	St. Louis Jimmy Oden	3:16
7.	"(You Make Me Feel Like) A Natural Woman" (Atlantic 2441 Billboard No. 8)	Gerry Goffin, Carole King, Jerry Wexler	2:42
8.	"Baby, Baby, Baby" (Atlantic 2441b)	Aretha Franklin, Carolyn Franklin	2:48
9.	"Chain of Fools" (Atlantic 2464 Billboard No. 2)	Don Covay	2:45
10.	"Prove It" (Atlantic 2464b)	Randy Everetts, Horace Ott	2:58
11.	"(Sweet Sweet Baby) Since You've Been Gone" (Atlantic 2486 Billboard No. 5)	Aretha Franklin, Ted White	2:18
12.	"Ain't No Way" (Atlantic 2486b Billboard No. 16)	Carolyn Franklin	4:12
13.	"Think" (Atlantic 2518 Billboard No. 7)	Aretha Franklin, Ted White	2:15
14.	"You Send Me" (Atlantic 2518b Billboard No. 56)	Sam Cooke	2:25
15.	"The House That Jack Built" (Atlantic 2546 Billboard No. 6)	Bob Lance, Fran Robbins	2:18
16.	"I Say a Little Prayer" (Atlantic 2546b Billboard No. 10)	Burt Bacharach, Hal David	2:41
17.	"See Saw" (Atlantic 2574 Billboard No. 14)	Steve Cropper, Don Covay	2:42
18.	"My Song" (Atlantic 2574b Billboard No. 31)	David James Mattis	3:23
Total length:			53:46

=== Disc two ===
No.	Title	Writer(s)	Length
1.	"The Weight" (Atlantic 2603 Billboard No. 19)	Robbie Robertson	2:52
2.	"The Tracks of My Tears" (Atlantic 2603b Billboard No. 71)	Smokey Robinson, Warren Moore, Marvin Tarplin	2:53
3.	"I Can't See Myself Leaving You" (Atlantic 2619 Billboard No. 28)	Ronnie Shannon	3:00
4.	"Gentle on My Mind" (Atlantic 2619b Billboard No. 76)	John Hartford	2:26
5.	"Share Your Love with Me" (Atlantic 2650 Billboard No. 13)	Alfred Braggs	3:16
6.	"Pledging My Love / The Clock" (Atlantic 2650b)	Ferdinand Washington, Don Robey / David James Mattis, John Alexander	4:10
7.	"Eleanor Rigby" (Atlantic 2683 Billboard No. 17)	John Lennon, Paul McCartney	2:35
8.	"It Ain't Fair" (Atlantic 2683b)	Ronnie Miller	3:20
9.	"Call Me" (Atlantic 2706 Billboard No. 13)	Aretha Franklin	3:16
10.	"Son of a Preacher Man" (Atlantic 2706b)	John Hurley, Ronnie Wilkins	3:04
11.	"Spirit in the Dark" (Atlantic 2731 Billboard No. 23 §)	Aretha Franklin	2:58
12.	"The Thrill Is Gone" (Atlantic 2731b §)	Art Benson, Gail Petite	4:43
13.	"Don't Play That Song" (Atlantic 2751 Billboard No. 11 §)	Betty Nelson, Ahmet Ertegun	3:00
14.	"Let It Be" (Atlantic 2751b §)	John Lennon, Paul McCartney	3:28
15.	"Border Song (Holy Moses)" (Atlantic 2772 Billboard No. 37)	Bernie Taupin, Elton John	3:20
16.	"You and Me" (Atlantic 2772b §)	Aretha Franklin	2:54
Total length:			50:45

§ with the Dixie Flyers

== Collective personnel ==
- Aretha Franklin – vocals, piano
- Bernie Glow, Wayne Jackson, Melvin Lastie, Joe Newman, Ernie Royal, Richard Williams – trumpets
- Jimmy Cleveland, Urbie Green, Benny Powell, Tony Studd – trombones
- Pepper Adams, Willie Bridges, Charles Chalmers, King Curtis, George Dorsey, Haywood Henry, Andrew Love, Seldon Powell, Frank Wess – saxophones
- Jack Jennings, Warren Smith, Ted Summer – vibraphone
- Barry Beckett, Jim Dickinson, Junior Mance, Spooner Oldham, Billy Preston, Truman Thomas, Mike Utley – keyboards
- Duane Allman, Kenny Burrell, Eric Clapton, Cornell Dupree, Charlie Freeman, Eddie Hinton, Jimmy Johnson, Chips Moman, Joe South, Bobby Womack – guitars
- Ron Carter, Tommy Cogbill, David Hood, Jerry Jemmott, Tommy McClure, Chuck Rainey – bass
- Bruno Carr, Gene Chrisman, Sammy Creason, Roger Hawkins, Ray Lucas – drums
- Louis Golcdecha, Manuel Gonzales – percussion
- J.R. Bailey, Margaret Branch, Ronald Bright, Brenda Bryant, Carolyn Franklin, Erma Franklin, Evelyn Green, Ellie Greenwich, Cissy Houston, Wyline Ivy, Amanda Lattimore, Pat Lewis, Sammy Turner, The Sweet Inspirations – backing vocals
- Ralph Burns, Arif Mardin – string arrangements, conductor

== Charts ==
Chart (2018)	Peak position
Hungarian Albums (MAHASZ)	22
US Billboard 200	65
US Top R&B/Hip-Hop Albums (Billboard)	35
