= 30 Greatest Hits (Aretha Franklin album) =

Greatest hits album by Aretha Franklin
- Released: October, 1986
- Recorded: 1967–1974
- Genre: R&B
- Label: Atlantic

Aretha Franklin chronology
Who's Zoomin' Who? (1985)	30 Greatest Hits (1986)	Aretha (1986)

Professional ratings
Review scores
Source	Rating
The Rolling Stone Album Guide	5/5 stars

30 Greatest Hits is a 1985 Aretha Franklin compilation album. The album chronicles majority of Franklin's hit singles during the Atlantic Records era from 1967 up to 1974. Following Franklin's death, the album entered the top ten of the Billboard 200 albums chart at number seven in the week ending on August 25, 2018, earning 52,000 units, of which 18,000 were traditional sales. It climbed one spot higher the following week, becoming Franklin's highest-peaking compilation album in the United States. 30 Greatest Hits was conceived and developed in Canada by Warner Music Canada's Atlantic Records marketing manager Kim Cooke who chose the repertoire, sequenced the double album and supervised the liner notes which were written by long-time music journalist Larry Leblanc. Original master tapes were sourced from Atlantic and re-mastered in Toronto. The album was released in Canada in 1983 and was an immediate hit eventually achieving platinum sales. Atlantic Records U.S. was made aware of its existence and released it worldwide in 1985. It has remained in print ever since. 30 Greatest Hits has earned a number of global plaudits including a five star review in Rolling Stone Magazine. All Music Guide made it their Aretha compilation "pick" and wrote that it was "a great (Aretha) foundation that has yet to be equalled."

== Track listing ==
Disc 1

1. "I Never Loved a Man (The Way I Love You)"
2. "Respect"
3. "Do Right Woman, Do Right Man"
4. "Dr. Feelgood"
5. "Save Me"
6. "Baby I Love You"
7. "(You Make Me Feel Like) A Natural Woman"
8. "Chain of Fools"
9. "(Sweet Sweet Baby) Since You've Been Gone"
10. "Ain't No Way"
11. "Think"
12. "I Say a Little Prayer"
13. "The House That Jack Built"
14. "See Saw"
15. "The Weight"
16. "Share Your Love with Me"
17. "Eleanor Rigby"

Disc 2

1. "Call Me"
2. "Spirit in the Dark"
3. "Don't Play That Song (You Lied)"
4. "You're All I Need to Get By"
5. "Bridge over Troubled Water"
6. "Spanish Harlem"
7. "Rock Steady"
8. "Oh Me Oh My (I'm a Fool for You Baby)"
9. "Day Dreaming"
10. "Wholy Holy"
11. "Angel"
12. "Until You Come Back to Me (That's What I'm Gonna Do)"
13. "I'm in Love"

== Charts ==
=== Weekly charts ===
Chart (2018)	Peak position
Australian Albums (ARIA)	16
Canadian Albums (Billboard)	9
Dutch Albums (Album Top 100)	151
Irish Albums (IRMA)	78
Scottish Albums (OCC)	28
Swiss Albums (Schweizer Hitparade)	9
UK Albums (OCC)	16
US Billboard 200	6
US Top R&B/Hip-Hop Albums (Billboard)	5

=== Year-end charts ===
Chart (2018)	Position
US Top R&B/Hip-Hop Albums (Billboard)	96

== Certifications ==
Region	Certification	Certified units/sales
United Kingdom (BPI)	Silver	60,000^{‡}
^{‡} Sales+streaming figures based on certification alone.
