= Rare & Unreleased Recordings from the Golden Reign of the Queen of Soul =

Compilation album by Aretha Franklin
- Released: October 16, 2007
- Genres: R&B, Soul
- Length: 2:18:38
- Label: Rhino
- Producer: Jerry Wexler

Aretha Franklin chronology
So Damn Happy (2003)	Rare & Unreleased Recordings from the Golden Reign of the Queen of Soul (2007)	Jewels in the Crown: All-Star Duets with the Queen (2008)

Professional ratings
Review scores
Source	Rating
Allmusic	3.5/5 stars

Rare & Unreleased Recordings from the Golden Reign of the Queen of Soul is a 2007 two-disc compilation album featuring unreleased and rare songs by Aretha Franklin recorded between 1966 and 1973 on Atlantic Records. The liner notes, nominated for a Grammy at the 51st Annual Grammy Awards, were co-written by Jerry Wexler, who was responsible for producing the sound which solidified Franklin as a legend, and David Ritz, who co-authored Franklin's 1999 autobiography.

== Track listing ==
Disc one, tracks 10, 14 and 18, and disc two, track 1, previously released.

Disc one, track 13, and disc two, tracks 1, 2, 4, 5, 7, 8, 13 and 17, were written solely by Aretha Franklin; disc one, track 2, was co-written with Ted White.

Disc One
No.	Title	Length
1.	"I Never Loved a Man (The Way I Love You)" (Demo)
2.	"Dr. Feelgood (Love Is a Serious Business)" (Demo)
3.	"Sweet Bitter Love" (Demo)
4.	"It Was You" (Aretha Arrives Outtake)
5.	"The Letter" (Aretha Arrives Outtake)
6.	"So Soon" (Aretha Arrives Outtake)
7.	"Mr. Big" (Aretha Now Outtake)
8.	"Talk To Me, Talk To Me" (Soul '69 Outtake)
9.	"The Fool on the Hill" (This Girl's in Love with You Outtake)
10.	"Pledging My Love/The Clock" (Single B-Side)
11.	"You're Taking Up Another Man's Place" (Spirit in the Dark Outtake)
12.	"You Keep Me Hangin' On" (This Girl's in Love with You/Spirit in the Dark Outtake)
13.	"I'm Trying To Overcome" (This Girl's in Love with You/Spirit in the Dark Outtake)
14.	"My Way" (Spirit in the Dark Outtake)
15.	"My Cup Runneth Over" (Young, Gifted and Black Outtake)
16.	"You're All I Need to Get By" (Take 1)
17.	"You're All I Need to Get By" (Take 2)
18.	"Lean On Me" (Single B-Side)

Disc Two
No.	Title	Length
1.	"Rock Steady" (Alternate Mix - Young, Gifted and Black Outtake)
2.	"I Need A Strong Man (The To-To Song)" (Young, Gifted and Black Outtake)
3.	"Heavenly Father" (Young, Gifted and Black Outtake)
4.	"Sweetest Smile and the Funkiest Style" (Hey Now Hey (The Other Side of the Sky) Outtake)
5.	"This Is" (Hey Now Hey (The Other Side of the Sky) Outtake)
6.	"Tree of Life" (Hey Now Hey (The Other Side of the Sky) Outtake)
7.	"Do You Know" (Hey Now Hey (The Other Side of the Sky) Outtake)
8.	"Can You Love Again" (Hey Now Hey (The Other Side of the Sky) Outtake)
9.	"I Want to Be With You" (Hey Now Hey (The Other Side of the Sky) Outtake)
10.	"Suzanne" (Hey Now Hey (The Other Side of the Sky) Outtake)
11.	"That's The Way I Feel About Cha" (Hey Now Hey (The Other Side of the Sky) Outtake)
12.	"Ain't But The One" (with Ray Charles)
13.	"The Happy Blues" (Let Me in Your Life Outtake)
14.	"At Last" (Let Me in Your Life Outtake)
15.	"Love Letters" (Let Me in Your Life Outtake)
16.	"I'm In Love" (Alternate Vocal - Let Me in Your Life Outtake)
17.	"Are You Leaving Me" (Demo)

== Charts ==
Chart (2007)	Peak position
Japanese Albums (Oricon)	208
US Top R&B/Hip-Hop Albums (Billboard)	87
