= Aretha's Gold =

1969 greatest hits album by Aretha Franklin

Greatest hits album by Aretha Franklin
- Released: June 1969
- Recorded: 1966–1968
- Studios: Atlantic Studios, New York; FAME, Muscle Shoals
- Genre: R&B
- Length: 41:17
- Label: Atlantic
- Producer: Jerry Wexler

Aretha Franklin chronology
Soft and Beautiful (1969)	Aretha's Gold (1969)	This Girl's in Love with You (1970)

Singles from Aretha's Gold
- 1. "The House That Jack Built" Released: July 1968

Professional ratings
Review scores
Source	Rating
AllMusic	4.5/5 stars
Tom Hull	A+

Aretha's Gold is a greatest hits album by Aretha Franklin, released in 1969 at Atlantic Recording Corporation. The album's tracks were recorded at Atlantic Studios, New York City, except "I Never Loved a Man (The Way I Love You)" and "Do Right Woman, Do Right Man", which were recorded at the Fame Recording Studios, Muscle Shoals, Alabama.

The album was included in Robert Christgau's "Basic Record Library" of 1950s and 1960s recordings, published in Christgau's Record Guide: Rock Albums of the Seventies (1981).

== Track listing ==
Side One

1. "I Never Loved a Man (The Way I Love You)" (Ronnie Shannon) - 2:47
2. "Do Right Woman, Do Right Man" (Dan Penn, Chips Moman) - 3:15
3. "Respect" (Otis Redding) - 2:26
4. "Dr. Feelgood" (Franklin, Ted White) - 3:18
5. "Baby, I Love You" (Ronnie Shannon) - 2:39
6. "(You Make Me Feel Like) A Natural Woman" (Gerry Goffin, Carole King & Jerry Wexler) - 2:37
7. "Chain of Fools" (Don Covay) - 2:45

Side Two

1. "(Sweet Sweet Baby) Since You've Been Gone" (Franklin, White) - 2:18
2. "Ain't No Way" (Carolyn Franklin, White) - 4:12
3. "Think" (Franklin, White) - 2:15
4. "You Send Me" (Sam Cooke) - 2:25
5. "The House That Jack Built" (Bob Lance, Fran Robins) - 2:18
6. "I Say a Little Prayer" (Burt Bacharach, Hal David) - 3:30
7. "See Saw" (Steve Cropper, Covay) - 4:42

== Personnel ==
- Aretha Franklin – piano, vocals

== Charts ==
Chart performance
Chart (2026)	Peak position
Croatian International Albums (HDU)	17

== Certifications ==
Region	Certification	Certified units/sales
Australia (ARIA)	Gold	35,000^{^}
^{^} Shipments figures based on certification alone.

== See also ==
- List of number-one R&B albums of 1969 (U.S.)
