= A Brand New Me (Aretha Franklin album) =

2017 compilation album by Aretha Franklin, with the Royal Philharmonic Orchestra

Compilation album by Aretha Franklin with the Royal Philharmonic Orchestra
- Released: November 10, 2017
- Studio: Abbey Road Studio 1, London, England; RAK Studios, London, England; Shine Studios, Salisbury, England; G Studio Digital, Los Angeles, United States
- Label: Rhino; Atlantic
- Producer: Nick Patrick; Don Reedman

Aretha Franklin chronology
| Aretha Franklin Sings the Great Diva Classics (2014) | A Brand New Me (2017) | The Atlantic Singles Collection 1967–1970 (2018) |

Professional ratings
Review scores
| Source | Rating |
|---|---|
| AllMusic | 1.5/5 stars |
| The Irish Times | 3/5 stars |
| PopMatters | 7/10 stars |

A Brand New Me is a compilation album by American recording artist Aretha Franklin. It was released on November 10, 2017, by Rhino Records and Atlantic Records. The album features archival vocal performances that Franklin recorded for Atlantic Records accompanied by new orchestral arrangements by the Royal Philharmonic Orchestra and newly recorded backing vocals, in addition to the original (archived) background vocal and instrumental accompaniments. Producer Nick Patrick said of the album: "There is a reason that Aretha Franklin is called the 'Queen of Soul.' There is nothing more exciting than that incredible voice taking you on an emotional roller coaster ride through her amazing repertoire of songs. To have the opportunity to work with that voice on this project has been the greatest honor and to hear a symphony orchestra wrapped around those performances is breathtaking." Franklin died in August 2018, nine months after the album's release.

== Track listing ==
All Tracks produced by Nick Patrick and Don Reedman, with background vocal production assisted by Greg Field.

| No. | Title | Writer(s) | Length |
|---|---|---|---|
| 1. | "Think" | Aretha Franklin; Ted White |
| 2. | "Don't Play That Song (You Lied)" | Ahmet Ertegün; Betty Nelson |
| 3. | "I Say a Little Prayer" | Burt Bacharach; Hal David |
| 4. | "Until You Come Back to Me (That's What I'm Gonna Do)" | Stevie Wonder; Clarence Paul; Morris Broadnax |
| 5. | "Brand New Me" | Kenneth Gamble; Theresa Bell; Jerry Butler |
| 6. | "(You Make Me Feel Like) A Natural Woman" | Gerry Goffin; Carole King; Jerry Wexler |
| 7. | "Angel" | Carolyn Franklin; Sonny Saunders |
| 8. | "Border Song (Holy Moses)" | Elton John; Bernie Taupin |
| 9. | "Let It Be" | John Lennon; Paul McCartney |
| 10. | "People Get Ready" | Curtis Mayfield |
| 11. | "Oh Me Oh My (I'm a Fool for You Baby)" | Jim Doris |
| 12. | "You're All I Need to Get By" | Nickolas Ashford; Valerie Simpson |
| 13. | "Son of a Preacher Man" | John Hurley; Ronnie Wilkins |
| 14. | "Respect" | Otis Redding |

== Personnel ==
Credits adapted from Allmusic and the album's liner notes

- Aretha Franklin – lead vocals* (All tracks), piano* (1–5, 8–14)
- Patti Austin – background vocals (All Tracks)
- Nigel Barr – trombone
- Barry Beckett – organ (played by)*
- Kenneth Bichel – synthesizer*
- Graeme Blevins – tenor saxophone
- Margaret Branch – background vocals* (2, 4)
- Willie Bridges – saxophone*
- Brenda Bryant – background vocals* (2)
- Andy Caine – background vocals
- Timothy "Tim" Cansfield – guitar (All Tracks)
- Ben Castle – alto saxophone
- Charles Chalmers – tenor saxophone*
- Gene Chrisman – drums*
- Ann S. Clark – background vocals*
- Peter Cobbin – recording engineer
- Tommy Cogbill – guitar* (1, 3), bass guitar*
- Richard Cottle – brass arrangement
- Sammy Creason – drums* (2)
- Danny Cummings – percussion (1, 4, 9, 14)
- Jim Dickinson – additional keyboards* (2)
- Cornell Dupree – bass guitar*
- Joe Farrell – tenor saxophone*
- Howard "Buzz" Feiten – guitar (2)
- Lynn Fiddmont – background vocals (All Tracks)
- Greg Field – background vocals, recording engineer
- Erma Franklin – background vocals*
- Charlie Freeman – guitar* (2)
- Eric Gale – bass guitar*
- Simon Gardiner – trumpet
- Ellie Greenwich – background vocals*
- Mirriam Grey – background vocals
- Graham Harvey – piano
- Donny Hathaway – piano*, organ*
- Roger Hawkins – drums* (1, 3, 9, 10, 13, 14), saxophone*, background vocals*
- Eddie Hinton – guitar*
- Nigel Hitchcock – alto saxophone
- Matt Holland – trumpet
- David Hood – bass guitar*
- Al Jackson Jr. – drums*
- Wayne Jackson – trumpet*
- Jerry Jemmott – bass guitar* (1, 3)
- Jimmy Johnson – bass guitar*, acoustic guitar* (1, 9, 13, 14)
- Almeda Lattimore – background vocals* (2)
- Ledisi – background vocals (All Tracks)
- Adam Linsley – trumpet
- Andrew Love – tenor saxophone*
- Ray Lucas – drums*
- Arif Mardin – brass arrangements*
- Tommy McClure – bass guitar* (2)
- Hugh McCracken – bass guitar*, electric guitar*
- Clare McInerney – baritone saxophone
- Pete Murray – organ, acoustic piano (1, 4, 6–14), electric piano
- Floyd Newman – bass saxophone*
- Dewey "Spooner" Oldham – organ* (1, 10, 14)
- Nick Patrick – rhythm arrangements
- Steve Pearce – bass (played by) (All Tracks)
- Josh Phillips – project manager
- Valerie Pinkston – background vocals (All Tracks)
- Billy Preston – piano*, organ*
- Bernard Purdie – drums*
- Ryan Quigley – trumpet
- Chuck Rainey – bass guitar*
- Don Reedman – rhythm arrangements
- Nigel Reeve – mastering
- Royal Philharmonic Orchestra – orchestra (played by)
- Ralph Salmins – drums (All Tracks)
- Peter Schwier – recording engineer, audio mixing
- Giancarlo Sciama – project manager
- Neil Sidwell – trombone
- Steve Sidwell – conductor, brass arrangements, string arrangements
- Pat Smith – background vocals*
- Robin Smith – conductor, orchestral arrangements, string arrangements
- Joe South – guitar*
- Paul Spong – trumpet
- Ray Staff – mastering
- Sweet Inspirations – background vocals* (1, 3, 5, 6, 8, 10–13)
- Jamie Talbot – tenor saxophone
- Richard Tee – organ*
- Cécile Tournesac – digital editing
- Mike Utley – additional keyboards* (2)
- Chris Walden – musical arrangements, brass arrangements, orchestral arrangements, string arrangements
- Jerry Weaver – guitar*
- Kirsty Whalley – digital editing
- Alistar White – trombone
- Chris White – tenor saxophone
- Martin Williams – baritone saxophone
- Shena Winchester – background vocals
- Andy Wood – trombone
- Phil Woods – alto saxophone soloist*

Performances with an Asterisk (*) indicates sampled archive performances.

== Charts ==
Chart performance for A Brand New Me
| Chart (2017–18) | Peak position |
|---|---|
| Australian Albums (ARIA) | 23 |
| Belgian Albums (Ultratop Flanders) | 22 |
| Belgian Albums (Ultratop Wallonia) | 44 |
| Dutch Albums (Album Top 100) | 22 |
| French Albums (SNEP) | 74 |
| German Albums (Offizielle Top 100) | 64 |
| New Zealand Albums (RMNZ) | 36 |
| Portuguese Albums (AFP) | 21 |
| Scottish Albums (OCC) | 45 |
| Spanish Albums (Promusicae) | 44 |
| Swiss Albums (Schweizer Hitparade) | 57 |
| UK Albums (OCC) | 45 |
| US Top Classical Albums (Billboard) | 1 |
