= Fonzi Thornton =

American singer-songwriter

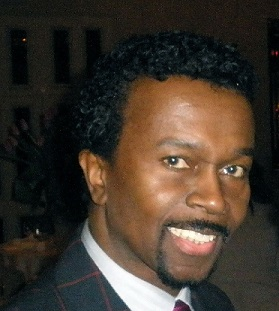
- Thornton in 2015

Background information
- Born: New York City, New York, United States
- Genres: R&B; pop; rock; gospel
- Occupations: Singer; songwriter; producer; vocal contractor
- Instrument: Vocals
- Years active: 1970–present
- Label: RCA

Alfonso "Fonzi" Thornton is an American vocalist, songwriter, producer and vocal contractor. In a career spanning 40 years, Thornton has sung backing vocals for top artists across many genres of music. His vocal credits can be found on the recordings of Aretha Franklin, Luther Vandross, Mick Jagger, Bryan Ferry, Roxy Music, Chic, Diana Ross, Garth Brooks, Ray Charles, Mariah Carey, Steely Dan, David Bowie, Robert Palmer, Patti LaBelle, Al Jarreau, Michael Jackson, Celine Dion, Phoebe Snow, Scritti Politti, Bette Midler, Lady Gaga and many others. In 2008, Thornton joined the musical entourage of Aretha Franklin as backing vocalist and vocal contractor and continued to accompany her in concert, on recordings and TV until her death in 2018.

== Early career ==
Born in East Harlem, New York, in his early teens, Alfonso {Fonzi} joined neighborhood vocal group, Shades of Jade and befriended a young Luther Vandross. Thornton and Vandross became soloists with Listen My Brother, the Apollo Theater’s 16 member artist development workshop and sang on camera during the second season of the children's show Sesame Street.

Later, Thornton gained a following on the NYC night club circuit with his band and self-titled vocal trio Fonzi. He and his group (renamed F360) toured England with Candi Staton and The Stylistics, then appeared with heavyweight Joe Frazier in a Miller Lite commercial.

== 1970–present ==
=== Chic ===
In the late 1970s, approached by producers Bernard Edwards and Nile Rodgers, Thornton joined the Chic organization as male vocalist on six albums and national concert tours. He can be heard on many of Chic's original recordings including "Good Times" and "My Forbidden Lover" from their 1979 Risqué. Thornton also appeared as the soloist on "You Can't Do It Alone" on Real People (1980).

After Chic disbanded in the early 1980s, Rodgers and Edwards continued to use the distinct backing vocals of Thornton on chart topping productions for artists like Mick Jagger, Diana Ross, David Bowie, The Power Station and Robert Palmer. In 2010, Nile Rodgers included remixes of "I Work For A Living" and "I'll Change My Game" (from Thornton's unreleased 1980 album produced by Rodgers and Edwards) on the Chic box set, Savoir Faire, released in France on Warner Bros. Most recently, Thornton provided backing vocals on Chic's 2015 release "I'll Be There".

=== Luther Vandross ===
From 1980 through 1982, Thornton rejoined his childhood friend Luther Vandross as a backup singer for his first two national tours. Besides singing on all of Vandross’ gold and platinum recordings, Thornton served as vocal contractor for every album, appeared on numerous TV shows, sat in on the singer's concerts and co-wrote songs on Luther's final four albums. In 1986, he sang alongside Vandross, Chaka Khan and others in the background chorus for David Bowie's single "Underground" from the film Labyrinth.

=== Roxy Music/Bryan Ferry ===
Crossing musical boundaries, in 1982 Thornton sang solo backing vocals on Roxy Music’s Avalon album and their world tour that followed. He performed with Bryan Ferry on several solo albums, on Saturday Night Live in 1987 and in 1985, at Live Aid. In 2007, Thornton reunited with Ferry on the Late Show with David Letterman for US debut of his CD Dylanesque, and in 2011 joined Ferry on his first U.S. tour in 15 years. In 2014, Thornton again joined Ferry, providing vocals on his most recent Avonmore album.

=== Solo career ===
In the spring of 1983, RCA Records released Thornton's debut urban soul-pop album The Leader (co-written and produced) featuring the lead single "Beverly", which reached number 43 on Billboard's R&B chart. Thornton's second solo album, titled Pumpin', was released in summer 1984 was representative of the dance/funk-rock vibe of the time. Both albums were re-released on UK Funkytown Grooves (2014).

== Later work ==
Thornton performs repeatedly at two events honoring life achievement in the arts – the Kennedy Center Honors (2003–2007 & 2015) and the Songwriters Hall of Fame (2001–2015).

He maintains his career as a session singer and appeared regularly in concert with Aretha Franklin. In October 2014, Thornton appeared with Aretha on the David Letterman Show to a standing ovation for her performance of Adele's Rolling in the Deep. Most recently, Thornton sang backup for Aretha's 2015 Kennedy Center Honors tribute to Carole King.

Thornton rejoined Bryan Ferry in concert on his 2014–2015 "Avonmore Tour" throughout Europe and the UK. He continued with Ferry on the 2016 "Avonmore Tour with shows in the UK, Europe and North America.

Thornton performed live on stage with Pearl Jam at Madison Square Garden on June 24–25, 2008 singing backup vocals on songs "All Night" "Who You Are" and "W.M.A."

Thorton provided backup vocals for Roxy Music's 50th anniversary tour 2022.

== Selected discography ==
Chic

- Real People (1980)
- Risqué (1979)

Roxy Music

- Avalon (1982)
- Heart Still Beating (1990)

Bryan Ferry

- Boys and Girls (1985)
- Mamouna (1994)
- Avonmore (2014)

Aretha Franklin

- Jump to It (1982)
- This Christmas, Aretha (2008)
- A Woman Falling Out of Love (2011)
- Aretha Franklin Sings the Great Diva Classics (2014)

Luther Vandross

- Never Too Much (1981)
- Give Me the Reason (1986)
- Dance with My Father (2003)
- Live Radio City Music Hall 2003 (2003)

Solo albums

- The Leader (1983)
- Pumpin' (1984)

Videos

- David Bowie: You've Been Around Colorized
- Aretha Franklin: Kennedy Center Honors 2015
- Bryan Ferry: Love Is The Drug
- Nile Rodgers & Chic: Le Freak
