= 30 Greatest Hits =

30 Greatest Hits may refer to:

- 30 Greatest Hits (Aretha Franklin album), 1985
- 30 Greatest Hits (Red Elvises album), 2006
- 30 Greatest Hits, an album by La Sombra, 1997
- Get Stoned (30 Greatest Hits), an album by The Rolling Stones, 1977
