= Aretha Franklin Sings the Great Diva Classics =

2014 studio album by Aretha Franklin

Studio album by Aretha Franklin
- Released: October 17, 2014
- Length: 40:26
- Label: RCA
- Producers: André "3000" Benjamin; Clive Davis; Antonio Dixon; Kenny "Babyface" Edmonds; Aretha Franklin; Terry Hunter; Eric Kupper; Harvey Mason, Jr.; Dapo Torimiro; Wayne Williams

Aretha Franklin chronology
A Woman Falling Out of Love (2011)	Aretha Franklin Sings the Great Diva Classics (2014)	A Brand New Me (2017)

Singles from Aretha Franklin Sings the Great Diva Classics
- 1. "Rolling in the Deep (The Aretha Version)" Released: September 29, 2014

Aretha Franklin Sings the Great Diva Classics is the thirty-eighth and final studio album by American singer Aretha Franklin. It was released by RCA Records on October 17, 2014. The album features ten cover versions of songs made famous by female recording artists, including Etta James, Gladys Knight, Alicia Keys, Destiny's Child, and others. Production on the album was overseen by André 3000, Antonio Dixon, Babyface, Harvey Mason, Jr. and Dapo Torimiro.

The album was Franklin's first and only recording for RCA, her first studio album to be released under a major label in 11 years (since the release of her 2003 studio album, So Damn Happy), and her first album since 1998 to be executively produced by Clive Davis, her boss at Arista Records, which has since folded into RCA. It is also her last studio album of entirely new and original recordings created prior to her death in 2018; the 2017 album A Brand New Me features vintage vocal performances from the 1960s and 1970s, paired with newer orchestral arrangements.

== Background ==
Aretha Franklin and music executive Clive Davis began their professional association in 1980 when she signed with Arista Records. During her time with the label, she achieved several hits, including the 1987 number one duet with singer George Michael, "I Knew You Were Waiting (For Me)." Both eventually moved on to other projects. In 2014, the pair reunited on Aretha Franklin Sings the Great Diva Classics, Franklin's first studio album to be released under a major label since the release of her 2003 studio album, So Damn Happy), and her first album since 1998 to be executively produced by Davis. Conceived as a cover album, it found her covering songs of several well-known female vocalists, including Etta James, Gladys Knight, and Destiny's Child, Davis called the album "purely and simply sensational" and said of Franklin, "She's on fire and vocally in absolutely peak form. What a thrill to see this peerless artist still showing the way, still sending shivers up your spine, still demonstrating that all contemporary music needs right now is the voice. What a voice." Production on the album includes R&B producers Kenny "Babyface" Edmonds and Harvey Mason, Jr., hip-hop musician André 3000, and house producers Terry Hunter and Eric Kupper among others.

== Promotion ==
The first single released from the album was a cover of English singer Adele's 2010 number-one hit "Rolling in the Deep", subtitled as "The Aretha Version", which also includes an interpolation of the Marvin Gaye and Tammi Terrell hit, "Ain't No Mountain High Enough". The song debuted at number 47 on the Billboard Hot R&B/Hip-Hop Songs chart. Franklin thus became the first woman, and fourth artist overall (following Lil Wayne, Jay-Z and James Brown), to place 100 songs on the chart (with her first entry on the chart being "Today I Sing the Blues" in 1960).

== Critical reception ==
Professional ratings
Aggregate scores
Source	Rating
Metacritic	66/100
Review scores
Source	Rating
AllMusic	2/5 stars
Billboard	3.5/5 stars
Cuepoint (Expert Witness)	A−
Entertainment Weekly	B−
Financial Times	3/5 stars
New York Daily News	4/5 stars
Rolling Stone	3.5/5 stars

At Metacritic, which assigns a normalized rating out of 100 to reviews from mainstream critics, Aretha Franklin Sings the Great Diva Classics has an average score of 66 based on nine reviews, indicating "generally favorable reviews". Rolling Stone journalist Will Hermes called the album a "delightful covers set" that showed that "Aretha can still step into the pop world at whim with total authority." Steve Morse, writing for The Boston Globe, noted that "Divas are everywhere these days, but there's still only one Aretha. At age 72, Franklin can still shut down the competition with a breathtaking, gospel-trained grace and power." New York Daily News editor Jim Farber found that "luckily, Franklin [...] acts more like a jazz singer, scatting and vamping her way through vocals that are ravenous and free, adventurous and loony. To her, these songs aren't destinations. They're vehicles for her to improvise and strut." Jon Pareles from The New York Times called Aretha Franklin Sings the Great Diva Classics a "fun album [of] a beloved voice applied to proven hits."

Financial Times editor Ludovic Hunter-Tilney noted that "the energy is heartening – but the results are mixed. Franklin pushes herself too hard in the more forceful passages of singing, a shrill edge entering her voice." Entertainment Weekly critic Tim Stack found that while Franklin "delivers a rollicking take on Adele's 'Rolling in the Deep'," the "covers of other lady icons — Chaka, Barbra, Etta — feel dated or ill-conceived. It all plays like the official soundtrack to Gay Pride 1977." AllMusic editor Andy Kellman wrote that "if there's one positive thing that can be said about the results, it's that Aretha sounds like she had a ball. The energy she put into these versions helps make up for the vocal shortcomings and audible use of Auto-Tune. She could have played it simple and straight, yet she clearly enjoyed the recording process, from melismatic accents to an abundance of personalized touches [...] Some of the creative moves are very questionable." In his reviews for The Daily Telegraph, Neil Mccormick concluded. "From the digitally tampered cover photo to the suspicion of digitally tampered vocals, this attempt to turn back the clock reeks of fakery and self-delusion."

== Commercial performance ==
In the United States, Aretha Franklin Sings the Great Diva Classics debuted at number 13 on the Billboard 200 and number three on the Top R&B/Hip-Hop Albums chart, selling 23,000 copies in its first week. It marked Franklin's highest-charting album since 1985, matching the peak of Who's Zoomin' Who? (1985) on both lists that year, as well as her best week sales frame since So Damn Happy (2003) shifted 27,000 in its third week on the chart. It also debuted at number one on Billboard's Top R&B Albums charts. Elsewhere, Aretha Franklin Sings the Great Diva Classics peaked at number 16 on the Italian Albums Chart, while also reaching the top thiry in Australia, Spain and Switzerland. In the United Kingdom, it opened at number 32 on the UK Albums Chart, becoming her highest-charting album since Soul '69, released in 1969.

== Track listing ==
Aretha Franklin Sings the Great Diva Classics track listing
No.	Title	Writer(s)	Producer(s)	Length
1.	"At Last" (originally performed by Glenn Miller; popularized by Etta James)	Mack Gordon; Harry Warren	Kenny "Babyface" Edmonds; Antonio Dixon; Clive Davis	3:53
2.	"Rolling in the Deep (The Aretha Version)" (originally performed by Adele)	Adele Adkins; Paul Epworth; Nickolas Ashford; Valerie Simpson	Edmonds; Dixon; Davis; Aretha Franklin	4:00
3.	"Midnight Train to Georgia" (originally performed by Cissy Houston; popularized by Gladys Knight & the Pips)	Jim Weatherly	Edmonds; Dixon; Davis; Franklin	4:21
4.	"I Will Survive (The Aretha Version)" (originally performed by Gloria Gaynor)	Freddie Perren; Dino Fekaris; Beyoncé Knowles; Anthony Dent; Mathew Knowles	Terry Hunter; DJ Wayne Williams; Franklin; Harvey Mason, Jr.^{[a]}	4:31
5.	"People" (originally performed by Barbra Streisand)	Jule Styne; Bob Merrill	Edmonds; Davis	4:04
6.	"No One" (originally performed by Alicia Keys)	Alicia Keys; Kerry Brothers, Jr.; George M. Harry	The Underdogs	4:01
7.	"I'm Every Woman" / "Respect" ("I'm Every Woman" originally performed by Chaka Khan)	Ashford; Simpson; Otis Redding	Eric Kupper	4:56
8.	"Teach Me Tonight" (originally performed by Dinah Washington)	Gene De Paul; Sammy Cahn	Edmonds; Dapo Torimiro; Davis	2:41
9.	"You Keep Me Hangin' On" (originally performed by The Supremes)	Holland–Dozier–Holland	Hunter; Williams; Mason, Jr.^{[a]}	4:41
10.	"Nothing Compares 2 U" (originally performed by The Family; popularized by Sinéad O'Connor)	Prince	André "3000" Benjamin	4:17
Total length:				40:26

Aretha Franklin Sings the Great Diva Classics: Dance Remixes
No.	Title	Length
1.	"Rolling in the Deep (The Aretha Version)" (Papercha$er remix)	5:16
2.	"Rolling in the Deep (The Aretha Version)" (Marc Stout & Tony Svejda remix)	6:10
3.	"Rolling in the Deep (The Aretha Version)" (Rosario & Cappo house mix)	7:13
4.	"Rolling in the Deep (The Aretha Version)" (Ralphi's Rolling in the Dub)	8:20
5.	"Rolling in the Deep (The Aretha Version)" (Wideboys club mix)	6:03
6.	"Rolling in the Deep (The Aretha Version)" (Mario Winans remix)	3:40
7.	"I Will Survive (The Aretha Version)" (Terry Hunter extended remix)	6:44
8.	"You Keep Me Hangin' On" (Terry Hunter extended remix)	6:56
9.	"I'm Every Woman" / "Respect" (Eric Kupper club mix)	8:24

Notes

- ^{^[a]} signifies a vocal producer
- "Rolling in the Deep (The Aretha Version)" contains an interpolation of "Ain't No Mountain High Enough" by Marvin Gaye & Tammi Terrell.
- "I Will Survive (The Aretha Version)" contains an interpolation of "Survivor" by Destiny's Child.

== Charts ==
=== Weekly charts ===
Weekly chart performance for Aretha Franklin Sings the Great Diva Classics
Chart (2014)	Peak position
Australian Albums (ARIA)	30
Belgian Albums (Ultratop Flanders)	81
Belgian Albums (Ultratop Wallonia)	46
Dutch Albums (Album Top 100)	49
French Albums (SNEP)	44
Italian Albums (FIMI)	16
South Korean International Albums (Gaon)	33
Spanish Albums (Promusicae)	26
Swiss Albums (Schweizer Hitparade)	30
UK Albums (Official Charts)	32
US Billboard 200	13
US Top R&B/Hip-Hop Albums (Billboard)	3

=== Year-end charts ===
Year-end chart performance for Aretha Franklin Sings the Great Diva Classics
Chart (2014)	Position
US Top R&B/Hip-Hop Albums (Billboard)	72
