= The Gay Sisters (group) =

American gospel music singing group

- From left to right, Evelyn, Mildred, and Geraldine.

Background information
- Genre: Gospel
- Years active: 1940s–1950s
- Labels: Savoy Records; Decca Records
- Past members: Evelyn Gay; Mildred Gay; Geraldine Gay

The Gay Sisters were an American Black gospel singing group in the 1950s. The three sisters, Evelyn Gay (1923–1984), Mildred Gay (1926–2002), and Geraldine Gay (1931–2010), were born and raised in Chicago and sang in a church choir led by their mother Fannie Gay. The sisters started performing and recording together in the late 1940s. The Gay Sisters are best known for their 1951 hit record "God Will Take Care of You", later recorded by Aretha Franklin.

== History ==
The Gay Sisters performed at the first gospel music concert, which was called the First Annual Negro Gospel Music Festival, at Carnegie Hall on October 1, 1950. At that concert, the Gay Sisters were on the same bill as Mahalia Jackson and the Clara Ward Singers. Evelyn and Mildred performed with their younger brother Donald, who was also known as the "Boy Preacher".

They are best known for their hit record "God Will Take Care of You" on Savoy Records in 1951. According to Bil Carpenter, "It sold an easy 100,000 units (an astounding amount of records for any genre to sell at the time), which in today's sales would be equal to the popularity of a platinum record."

The Gay Sisters recorded two songs for the Dolphin label in 1948, two songs for Exclusive Records in 1949, twelve songs for Savoy in 1951, and two songs for Decca Records in 1955. The twelve songs on Savoy were rereleased on an album in 1958.

Mildred sang soprano. Boyer wrote, "that the lyric soprano of Mildred was equal to that of Delois Barrett or Marion Williams." Evelyn played sanctified blues piano for the group; she is listed as one of the top ten pianists of the middle period of the Golden Age of Gospel Music. Geraldine was also a gospel pianist who added early bebop riffs and chords to her playing; she was called the "Erroll Garner of gospel."

Evelyn Gay accompanied and recorded with The Staple Singers on a small Chicago label, United, in 1953. She recorded with The Soul Stirrers, with and without Sam Cooke, on Specialty in 1957 and 1958.

In 1966, Geraldine and Donald recorded nine songs for Checker Records. Two of them were released: "Let Me Alone" and "He’s Calling Me".

Family members performed at the United States Bicentennial in 1976 at the Smithsonian Institution in Washington, DC.

After Evelyn died in 1984, Mildred, Geraldine, and Donald recorded several tracks on Anthony Heilbut's production, the Soul of Chicago. Geraldine also accompanied Lucy Smith Collier on this recording. After Mildred died in 2002, Geraldine and Donald made two records on The Sirens Records, In the Right Hands and Soulful Sounds.

== Influence ==
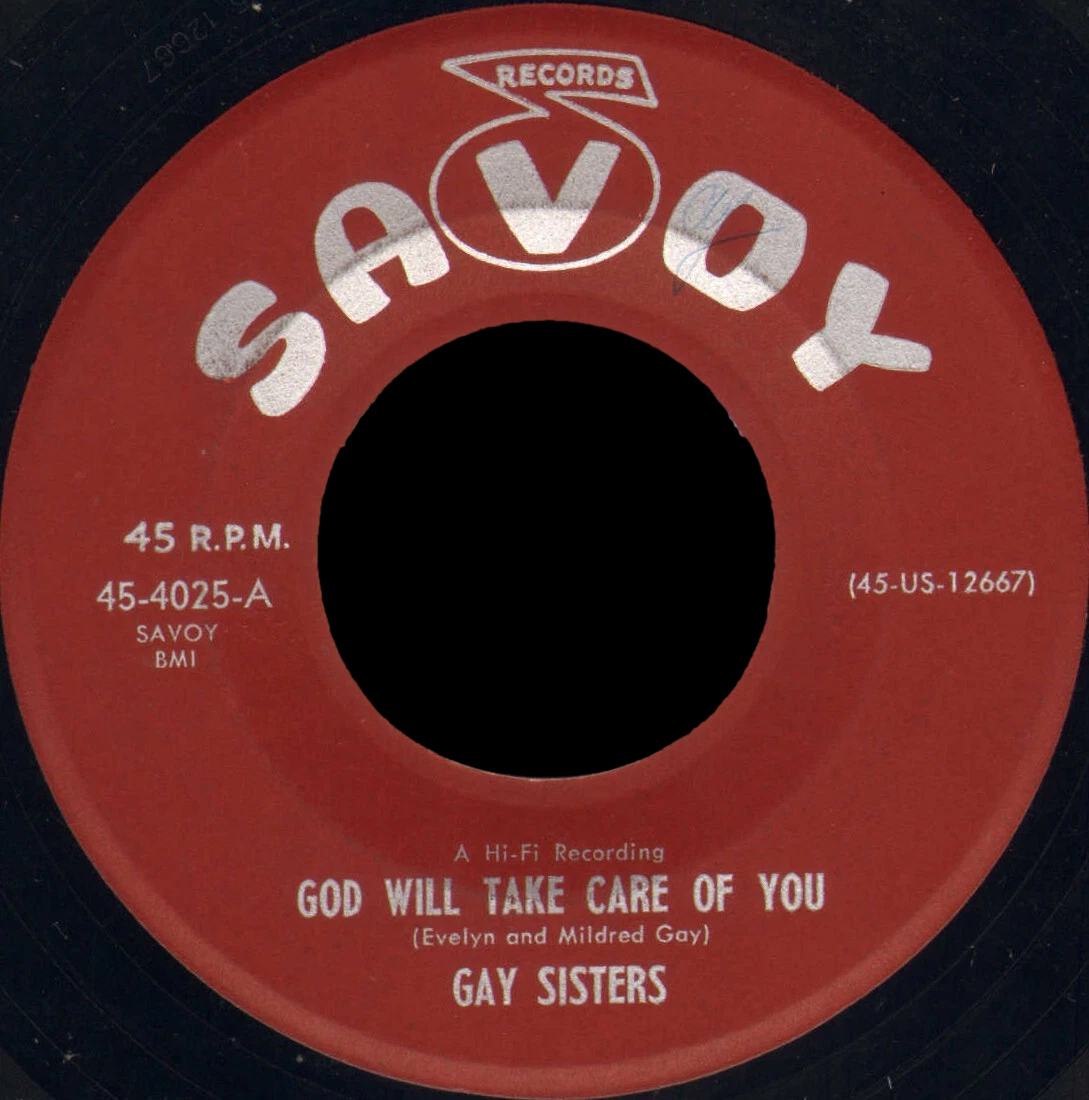
"God Will Take Care of You" (1951) was later covered by Aretha Franklin.

Aretha Franklin recorded "God Will Take Care of You" song on her Amazing Grace gospel live album with the Reverend James Cleveland and choir, in 1972, which sold over two million copies and won the 1973 Grammy for Best Soul Gospel performance. Cohen asserts, "The Gay Sisters' version of the song would've been the one that Franklin heard on the circuit, and Cleveland would've been well aware of it because of his affinity for the family (the Gay family)."

The group also influenced The Barrett Sisters.

== Family ==
The sisters' parents were Jerry (1897–1978) and Fannie (1907–1999) Gay. They also raised two sons, Robert (1924–1967) and Donald (born 1945). Robert was a jazz trumpet player who was known as "Little Diz". Robert Gay and Sonny Rollins did drug rehabilitation at the same time at the Federal Medical Center in Lexington, Kentucky. Sonny Rollins lived with the Gay family in Chicago before and after his drug treatment. As of 2025, Donald is the pastor of the Prayer Center Church of God in Christ in Chicago, Illinois, which was founded by Fannie Gay in 1959.Sacre, Robert (2013). Liner notes for the Gay Family compact disc (Media notes). Donald recorded another record, On a Glorious Day, in 2019.

Can I Get a Witness! Faith, Family, and Chicago Gospel Music is an account of The Gay Sisters written by Steven B. Dolins with Gregory Donald Gay, and includes a foreward by Sonny Rollins.

== Works ==
- Dixon, Jessy, Geraldine Gay, Donald Gay, and Nash Shaffer Jr. In the Right Hands. The Sirens Records SR-5010, 2004, compact disc.
- Franklin, Aretha. Amazing Grace. Atlantic, 1972.
- Gay Family. God Will Take Care of You. Recorded 1948–1977. Gospel Friend Records, 2013, compact disc.
- Gay, Donald. On a Glorious Day. The Sirens Records SR-5027, 2019.
- Gay, Geraldine, and Donald Gay. Soulful Sounds. The Sirens Records SR-5016, 2007, compact disc.
- The Soul of Chicago. Shanachie CD-6008, 1993, compact disc.
