= Aretha in Paris =

1968 live album by Aretha Franklin

Live album by Aretha Franklin
- Released: October 1968
- Recorded: May 7, 1968 (Paris, France)
- Genres: Deep soul, Southern soul, soul, R&B
- Labels: Atlantic (#8207), Atco Remasters
- Producer: Jerry Wexler

Aretha Franklin chronology
Aretha Now (1968)	Aretha in Paris (1968)	Soul '69 (1969)

Alternative cover
- UK cover

Professional ratings
Review scores
Source	Rating
AllMusic	2.5/5 stars
The Rolling Stone Album Guide	3/5 stars

Aretha In Paris is a live album by American singer Aretha Franklin, released in 1968, by Atlantic Records. The album was recorded in Paris, France, on May 7, 1968. It ended her Top Five streak, stalling at #13 on the Billboard album chart and experiencing meager sales.

It was reissued on compact disc through Rhino Records in the 1990s.

== Track listing ==
1. "(I Can't Get No) Satisfaction" (Mick Jagger, Keith Richards)
2. "Don't Let Me Lose This Dream" (Franklin, Teddy White)
3. "Soul Serenade" (Luther Dixon, Curtis Ousley)
4. "Night Life" (Willie Nelson, Walt Breeland, Paul Buskirk)
5. "Baby, I Love You" (Jimmy Holiday, Ronnie Shannon)
6. "Groovin'" (Eddie Brigati, Felix Cavaliere)
7. "(You Make Me Feel Like) A Natural Woman" (Carole King, Gerry Goffin, Jerry Wexler)
8. "Come Back Baby" (Ray Charles)
9. "Dr. Feelgood (Love Is a Serious Business)" (Franklin, Teddy White)
10. "(Sweet Sweet Baby) Since You've Been Gone" (Franklin, Teddy White)
11. "I Never Loved a Man (The Way I Love You)" (Ronnie Shannon)
12. "Chain of Fools" (Don Covay)
13. "Respect" (Otis Redding)

== Personnel ==
- Aretha Franklin - vocals, piano
- Carolyn Franklin - background vocals
- Charnessa Jones - background vocals
- Wyline Ivey - background vocals
- Jerry Weaver - guitar
- Gary Illingworth - piano
- George Davidson - drums
- Ron Jackson - trumpet
- David Squire - baritone saxophone
- Donald "Buck" Waldon - tenor saxophone
- Charlie Gabriel - tenor saxophone
- Donald Townes - trumpet
- Little John Wilson - trumpet
- Miller Brisker - tenor saxophone
- Rene Pitts - trombone
- Rodderick Hicks - bass
- Russell Conway - trumpet

== Charts ==
Chart (1968)	Peak position
US Billboard 200	13
US Top R&B/Hip-Hop Albums (Billboard)	2
