= This Christmas, Aretha =

2008 studio album by Aretha Franklin

This Christmas

Studio album by Aretha Franklin
- Released: October 14, 2008
- Recorded: June–August 2008
- Studios: Firehouse Recording Studios (Pasadena, CA); Studio A Recording (Dearborn, MI); Capitol Studios (Hollywood, CA); Legacy Studios (New York, NY); Glenwood Place Studios (Burbank, CA)
- Genres: R&B; Christmas
- Length: 51:00
- Label: DMI
- Producers: Aretha Franklin; Tena Clark

Aretha Franklin chronology
Jewels in the Crown: All-Star Duets with the Queen (2007)	This Christmas (2008)	A Woman Falling Out of Love (2011)

This Christmas is the first Christmas album and thirty-sixth studio album by American singer Aretha Franklin. Produced by Franklin and Tena Clark, it was originally released on October 14, 2008, as a Borders exclusive, consisting of eleven cover versions of Christmas standards and carols. In 2009, the album was reissued by DMI Records. This Christmas peaked at number 102 on the US Billboard 200.

== Critical reception ==
Professional ratings
Review scores
Source	Rating
About.com	3/5 stars
AllMusic	3/5 stars
MSN Music	3.5/5 stars
The Toronto Star	3/4 stars

Allmusic editor Andy Kellman wrote:

"the disc is filled mostly with the spiritual and relatively serious side of holiday material. The likes of "Silent Night," "Ave Maria," "Hark! The Herald Angels Sing," and "Angels We Have Heard on High" are given the kind of treatment only Aretha could grant .... It's not all reverence and reflection: best of all is a reading of "'Twas the Night Before Christmas" that can only be termed "personalized".

== Track listing ==
Credits taken from the album's liner notes.

This Christmas, Aretha track listing
No.	Title	Writer(s)	Producer(s)	Length
1.	"Angels We Have Heard on High"	James Chadwick	Tena Clark	5:26
2.	"This Christmas" (with Edward Franklin)	Donny Hathaway; Nadine McKinnor	Clark	5:23
3.	"My Grown-Up Christmas List"	David Foster; Linda Thompson-Jenner	Clark	5:15
4.	"The Lord Will Make a Way"	Traditional	Aretha Franklin	5:43
5.	"Silent Night"	Franz Gruber; Josef Mohr	Clark	5:06
6.	"Ave Maria"	Charles Gounod; Johann Sebastian Bach	Clark	4:57
7.	"Christmas Ain't Christmas (Without the One You Love)"	Kenneth Gamble; Leon Huff	Clark	3:53
8.	"14 Angels"	Engelbert Humperdinck	Franklin	2:08
9.	"One Night With the King"	Jeannie Tenney	Franklin	6:09
10.	"Hark! The Herald Angels Sing"	Charles Wesley; Felix Mendelssohn	Clark	5:24
11.	"'Twas the Night Before Christmas"	Clement C. Moore	Franklin	1:52

== Personnel ==
Credits adapted from the album's liner notes.

Vocalists

- Aretha Franklin – lead vocals (1, 4–7, 10), vocals (2, 3, 8, 9, 11)
- Edward Franklin – vocals (2)
- Tawatha Agee – backing vocals (4)
- Shelly Ponder – backing vocals (4)
- Fonzi Thornton – backing vocals (4, 7), BGV contractor (7)
- Brenda White-King – backing vocals (4, 7)
- Lisa Fischer – backing vocals (7)
- Vaneese Thomas – backing vocals (7)

The Fire Choir (Tracks 1, 5, 6 & 10)

- Bridgette Bryant
- Alvin Chea
- Lynne Fiddmont
- Wendy Fraser
- Dorian Holley
- Clydene Jackson
- Susie Stevens-Logan
- Carmen Twillie (also choir arrangements and conductor)
- Oren Waters
- Gerald White
- Terry Wood (also choir contractor)

Musicians

- Timothy Heinz – keyboards (1, 6, 10)
- James "Big Jim" Wright – keyboards (2, 3, 7)
- Richard Gibbs – acoustic piano (4, 9)
- Darryl Houston – organ (4, 9)
- Aretha Franklin – acoustic piano (5, 8)
- Paul Jackson Jr. – guitar (1, 2, 6, 7, 10)
- Matt Dahlgren – guitar (4, 9)
- Teddy Richards-White – guitar (4)
- Nathan East – bass (1–3, 6, 7, 10)
- Charles "Volley" Craig – bass (4, 8, 9)
- Ricky Lawson – drums (1–3, 6, 7, 10)
- Arthur Marbury – drums (4, 8, 9)
- Luis Conte – percussion (2, 3, 7)
- Michito Sanchez – percussion (7)
- Brandon Fields – saxophone (7)
- Onita Sanders – harp (8)

Music arrangements

- Bill Meyers – orchestral arrangements and conductor
- Suzie Katayama – orchestra contractor
- Timothy Heinz – rhythm arrangements (1, 6, 10)
- James "Big Jim" Wright – rhythm arrangements (2, 3, 7)
- Aretha Franklin – arrangements (4, 8)
- H. B. Barnum – conductor (4, 8, 9)

Production and Technical

- Ken Batchelor – A&R
- Tena Clark – producer (1–3, 5–7, 10, 11)
- Aretha Franklin – producer (4, 8, 9)
- Les Cooper – recording (1–3, 5–7, 10, 11)
- Todd Fairall – recording (4, 8, 9)
- Michael J. Powell – engineer (4, 8, 9), consultant (4, 8, 9)
- Al Schmitt – mixing, string recording
- Don Goodrick – assistant engineer
- George Gumbs – assistant engineer
- Tony Rizzo – assistant engineer
- Ed Woolley – assistant engineer
- Steve Genewick – Pro Tools editing
- Doug Sax – mastering at The Mastering Lab (Ojai, California)
- Ivy Skoff – production coordinator
- Ruth Bowen – product manager
- Diana Barnes – art direction, design
- Timothy White – photography
- Mia Morgan – styling
- Katherine Bocci – gown designs
- Renee Garnes – make-up
- Carlton Northern – hair
- Travolta Williams – hair

== Charts ==
Chart (2009–2011)	Peak position
US Billboard 200	102
US Top Holiday Albums (Billboard)	22
