= Soft and Beautiful =

1969 studio album by Aretha Franklin

Studio album by Aretha Franklin
- Released: April 1969
- Recorded: July 9–16, 1964
- Genre: Soul, R&B
- Length: 34:23
- Label: Columbia
- Producer: Clyde Otis

Aretha Franklin chronology
Soul '69 (1969)	Soft and Beautiful (1969)	Aretha's Gold (1969)

Soft and Beautiful is the fifteenth studio album by the American singer Aretha Franklin, released in the spring of 1969 by Columbia Records.

== Background ==
The album was recorded when Franklin was 22 years old between July 9 and 16, 1964, It was her last album on Columbia before she moved to Atlantic Records and until 1969, unreleased, although an alternative version of "A Mother's Love" appeared on Franklin's 1966 Columbia LP Soul Sister. It reached Number 29 on Billboard's R&B chart. Mark Bego, in Aretha Franklin: The Queen of Soul, called it "the most consistently paced album of her later Columbia years". Originally released by Columbia Records, the album was reissued on CD with her 1962 album The Tender, The Moving, The Swinging Aretha Franklin.

== Track listing ==
Side One

1. "Only the Lonely" (Sammy Cahn, Jimmy Van Heusen)
2. "I Wish I Didn't Love You So" (Frank Loesser)
3. "(Ah, the Apple Trees) When the World Was Young" (Johnny Mercer, M. Philippe-Gérard)
4. "Shangri-La" (Carl Sigman, Robert Maxwell, Matty Malneck)
5. "A Mother's Love" (Cliff Owens)

Side Two

1. "My Coloring Book" (John Kander, Fred Ebb)
2. "Jim" (Nelson Shawn, Caesar Petrillo, Edward Rose)
3. "Friendly Persuasion (Thee I Love)" (Paul Francis Webster, Dimitri Tiomkin)
4. "But Beautiful" (Johnny Burke, Jimmy Van Heusen)
5. "People" from Funny Girl (Jule Styne, Bob Merrill)

== Personnel ==
- Aretha Franklin – vocals
