= The House of Blue Lights (album) =

Studio album by Don Covay & The Jefferson Lemon Blues Band
- Released: 1969
- Studio: Herb Abramson's A-1 Studio
- Genre: Rhythm and blues, electric blues, soul blues, blues rock
- Label: Atlantic Records; Sepia Tone Records
- Producer: Don Covay

Don Covay & The Jefferson Lemon Blues Band chronology
See Saw	The House of Blue Lights	Country Funk

Professional ratings
Review scores
Source	Rating
AllMusic	4.5/5 stars

The House of Blue Lights is a rhythm and blues album by the soul music artist Don Covay & the Jefferson Lemon Blues Band. It was released in 1969 on Atlantic Records.

Unlike Covay's previous two more Southern soul oriented albums, Covay teamed with former Shirelles guitarist Joe Richardson and folk musician John Hammond in the Jefferson Lemon Blues Band, in an attempt at an underground blues rock.

The album was re-issued on compact disc on September 26, 2002 by Sepia Tone Records.

== Track listing ==
1. "Key to the Highway" (Big Bill Broonzy, Charles Segar) – 2:21
2. "Mad Dog Blues" (Don Covay, Joe Richardson) – 3:28
3. "The Blues Don't Knock" (John Denioa, Sidney Wyche) – 3:11
4. "Blues Ain't Nothin' but a Good Woman on Your Mind" (Covay, Richardson) – 3:12
5. "The House of Blue Lights, Pt. 1" (Covay) – 7:33
6. "Four Women" (Covay) – 3:34
7. "Steady Roller" (Covay, John Hammond Jr.) – 3:17
8. "Homemade Love" (Covay) – 6:26
9. "But I Forgive You Blues" (Hudson Whittaker) – 2:31
10. "Shut Your Mouth" (Dave Clowney) – 3:23
11. "The House of Blue Lights, Pt. 2" (Covay) – 4:09

== Personnel ==
=== The band ===
- Don Covay – vocals
- John Hammond, Jr. – guitar, harmonica
- Jerry Jemmott – bass
- Daniel Jones – drums
- Charles "Honeyman" Otis – drums
- Joe Richardson – guitar, vocals
- Butch Valentine – bass
- uncredited – Hammond organ

=== Technical staff ===
- Don Covay – arranger, producer
- Herb Abramson – engineer
- David Cheppa – mastering
