= A Woman Falling Out of Love =

2011 studio album by Aretha Franklin

Studio album by Aretha Franklin
- Released: May 3, 2011
- Recorded: 2006–10
- Genre: R&B
- Length: 60:59
- Label: Aretha's
- Producers: Curtiss Boone; Aretha Franklin (also exec.); Brian Garrett; Joseph Hall; Sanchez Harley; Marty Paich; Norman West

Aretha Franklin chronology
This Christmas, Aretha (2008)	A Woman Falling Out of Love (2011)	Aretha Franklin Sings the Great Diva Classics (2014)

A Woman Falling Out of Love is the thirty-seventh studio album by American singer Aretha Franklin. It was released by Franklin's own label Aretha's Records on May 3, 2011, in the United States. Sold exclusively through American retailer Walmart until June 3, it marked the singer's debut with her label following her departure from Arista Records and the release of the Christmas album This Christmas (2008). Featuring modern standards and familiar classics as well as guest vocalists Ronald Isley, Eddie Franklin, and Karen Clark-Sheard, Franklin produced most of the material herself.

Upon release, the album received a mixed reception by critics, many of whom praised Franklin's ambitions but found the sound of A Woman Falling Out of Love too generic and dated. With little promotion, the project debuted and peaked at number 54 on the US Billboard 200 album chart and dropped off the chart two weeks later. It also reached number 15 on the US Top R&B/Hip-Hop Albums. The lead single, opening track "How Long I've Waited", peaked at number 91 on Billboard's R&B chart. A Woman Falling Out of Love would remain Franklin's sole release with Aretha's Records.

== Background ==
In 2003, Franklin released her thirty-fifth studio album So Damn Happy with Arista Records. A breakaway from her previous album A Rose Is Still a Rose (1998) which had been recorded under the guidance of Clive Davis along with many famed hip hop producers and rappers, such as Lauryn Hill, Sean "Puffy" Combs, and Jermaine Dupri, Franklin collaborated with then-new Arista label head L.A. Reid and producers Burt Bacharach, Norman West, Gordon Chambers, and Jimmy Jam and Terry Lewis on a more traditional project. In the United States, So Damn Happy peaked at number 33 on the US Billboard 200, with first week sales of 28,000 copies, Franklin best career sales frame until 2014.

Though Clive Davis wanted her to stay with the label – following Arista's merger with the RCA Music Group of which he had become CEO – he and Franklin could not come to terms "on what things should be," leading to her departure. While she spoke with several other record companies, Franklin eventually decided to found her own independent record label, Aretha's Records, to release further music on it. Recording of A Woman Falling Out of Love began in 2006 and saw her working with producers Michael Powell and singers Shirley Caesar and Faith Hill. Initially expected to be released in the first quarter of 2007, its release was postponed and some early material, including Franklin's duets with Caesar and Hill as well as the title track and collaborations with Troy Taylor and Gordon Chambers, eventually omitted in favor of newer songs that were recorded between 2007 and 2010, "off and on between concerts, between commercials."

== Critical reception ==
Professional ratings
Review scores
Source	Rating
Los Angeles Times	2.5/4 stars
Rolling Stone	2.5/5 stars

Evelyn McDonnell from The Los Angeles Times wrote that "Never one for restraint, [Franklin] piles on the strings and keyboards, matching her multi-octave melismas with lavish instrumentation. A Woman Falling Out of Love is like a gourmet Sunday brunch buffet, overflowing with opulent deliciousness – indulgent, fattening, sugary, and just in time for Mother's Day." New York Daily News noted that the album "boasts some of Aretha's most acrobatic, sure and robust vocals in years. It's lively, funny and, if anything, overambitious." Rolling Stone critic Will Hermes found that "there are magic moments [...] but unmemorable songs and overcooked arrangements suggest too many opportunities squandered. Here's hoping The Roots, T Bone Burnett and Rick Rubin all submit producer applications for Her Majesty's next outing."

Washington Post editor Allison Stewart felt that the album "appears to indulge every wrong musical instinct Franklin has ever had. This is the sound of a legend doing exactly as she pleases, which in Franklin's case means plenty of lite R&B ballads and underdone covers of overdone standards [...] Franklin's miracle of a voice remains essentially intact, though she is no longer the matter-of-fact belter of old, relying instead on either Christina Aguilera-style oversinging or a weird, marble-mouthed mumble. The Chicago Sun-Times remarked that on A Woman Falling Out of Love Franklin's "in retreat. The songwriting is '70s, the production is '80s, the arrangements are pure '90s smooth jazz. Instead of a contemporary queen, we get an unsettling Eartha Kitt-enish cougar anthem, clumsy jazz-club scat singing, an icy reading of "Theme from A Summer Place" and an overthought gospel rendition of "My Country 'Tis of Thee." [...] The album's two bright spots come late in the sequence, and they both feature the songwriting of the underappreciated Norman West."

== Chart performance ==
A Woman Falling Out of Love was made available exclusively at Walmart stores and Walmart.com, beginning on May 3, 2011. The digital version of the album was offered on iTunes, Amazon and other digital retailers on June 3, 2011. In the week of May 21, 2011, it debuted and peaked at number 54 on the US Billboard 200 with first-week sales of 10,070 units, also reaching number 15 on the US Top R&B/Hip-Hop Albums. This marked Franklin's lowest-chart debut for a regular studio album since What You See Is What You Sweat (1991). A Woman Falling Out of Love dropped off the chart two weeks later.

== Track listing ==
No.	Title	Writer(s)	Producer(s)	Length
1.	"How Long I've Been Waiting"	Aretha Franklin	Aretha Franklin	5:19
2.	"Sweet Sixteen"	Joe Bihari; Riley B. King	Franklin	5:10
3.	"This You Should Know"	Franklin	Franklin	4:15
4.	"U Can't See Me"	Curtiss Boone	Curtiss Boone	5:05
5.	"A Summer Place"	Mack Discant; Max Steiner	Franklin	8:50
6.	"The Way We Were" (featuring Ronald Isley)	Alan Bergman; Marilyn Bergman; Marvin Hamlisch	Marty Paich	5:28
7.	"New Day"	Kecalf Franklin Cunningham; Norman West	Brian Garrett; Joseph Hall	4:17
8.	"Put It Back Together Again"	Norman West	Norman West	6:15
9.	"Faithful" (featuring Karen Clark Sheard)	Richard Smallwood	Sanchez Harley; Jacqui Whittman (co.); AyRon Lewis (ass.)	6:31
10.	"His Eye Is on the Sparrow" (featuring Eddie Franklin-White)	Civilla D. Martin; Charles H. Gabriel	Franklin	6:09
11.	"When 2 Become One"	Boone	Boone	4:56
12.	"My Country, 'Tis of Thee"	Samuel Francis Smith	Franklin	2:56

== Personnel ==
Credits adapted from the album's liner notes.

Vocalists

- Aretha Franklin – Vocals (1–4, 6–8, 11, Lead on 5, 9, 12)
- Brenda Corbett – Background Vocals (5, 12)
- Brenda White King – Background Vocals (12)
- Desmond Pringle – Background Vocals (9)
- Eddie Franklin-White – Lead Vocals (8, 10)
- Fonzi Thornton – Background Vocals (12)
- Karen Clark Sheard – Lead Vocals (9)
- Kevin Williams – Background Vocals (8)
- Kim Fleming – Background Vocals (9)
- Millie Scott – Background Vocals (5, 12)
- Miranda – Background Vocals (9)
- Nathan Young – Background Vocals (9)
- Norman West – Background Vocals (8)
- Rick Black – Background Vocals (8)
- Robert Bailey – Background Vocals (9)
- Ronald Isley – Vocals (6)
- San Stancil – Background Vocals (9)
- Shelly Ponder – Background Vocals (5, 12)
- Suzanne Young – Background Vocals (9)
- Vicki Hampton – Background Vocals (9)
- Victoria Purcell – Background Vocals (9)

String Section

- Amy Wickman – Violin (12)
- Anna Kostyuchek – Violin (12)
- Bob Peterson – Violin (12)
- Cameron Patrick – Violin (12)
- Caroline Campbell – Violin (12)
- Daphne Chen – Violin (12)
- Gina Kronstadt – Violin (12)
- Jimbo Ross – Viola (12)
- Joel Derouin – Concert Master (12)
- John Wittenberg – Violin (12)
- Leah Katz – Viola (12)
- Lesa Terry – Violin (12)
- Lisa Dondlinger – Violin (12)
- Mark Cargill – Violin (12)
- Miguel Martinez – Cello (12)
- Nancy Stein-Ross – Cello (12)
- Peggy Baldwin – Cello (12)
- Pam Gates – Violin (12)
- Robin Ross – Viola (12)
- Sharon Jackson – Violin (12)
- Susan Chatman – Violin (12)
- Yvette Deveraux – Violin (12)

Other Instrumentalists

- Aretha Franklin – Acoustic Piano (2, 3, 5, 10, 12)
- Andrew Gouché – Additional Bass (9)
- Arthur "Buster" Marbury – Drums (12)
- Calvin Rodgers – Drums (9)
- Catherine Thompson – Flute (12)
- Charles "Volley" Craig – Bass Guitar (2, 3, 5), Drums (12)
- Charlie Peterson – Trumpet (12)
- Chimbat Batmunkh – Synthesizer (12)
- Daniel Weatherspoon – Synthesizer (9)
- Darrell Houston – Organ played by (10, 12)
- Derrick Lee – Piano (9)
- Eric Darken – Percussion (9)
- George Shelby – Clarinet (12)
- Harry Kim – Trumpet (12)
- James "Big Jim" Wright – Organ played by (2, 3, 5)
- John Smith-Power – Guitar (9)
- Mark Baldwin – Guitar (9)
- Mike Mendingall – Synthesizer (2, 3, 5)
- Myron Bell – Drums (2, 3, 5)
- Patricia Skye – French Horn (12)
- Paul Loredo – French Horn (12)
- Reggie Hamilton – Bass Guitar
- Richard Gibbs – Electric Piano (2, 3, 5)
- Robert Watt – French Horn (12)
- Simeon Baker – Bass Guitar (9)
- Teddy Richards – Guitar (2, 3, 5)
- Terry Baker – Drums (9)
- Will Miller – Trumpet (12)

Technical

- Aretha Franklin – Musical Arrangements (2, 3, 5, 12)
- Alan Litten – Recording Engineer (Rhythm Section & Vocals)
- Alan Little – Recording Engineer (9)
- AyRon Lewis – Assistant Engineer (9)
- Brian Pastoria – Assistant Engineer (9)
- Deb Chase – Production Coordinator
- Derrick Lee – Musical Arrangements (9)
- Devon Hawkins – Assistant Engineer (9)
- Ernie Fields Jr. – Contractor
- H. B. Barnum – Musical Arrangements (2, 12)
- Jacqui Whittman – Production Coordinator
- James Waddell – Audio Mixing
- Lloyd Barry – String Arrangements (9)
- Marilyn Cathey – Production Coordinator
- Marty Paich – Musical Arrangements (6)
- Michael J. Powell – Assistant Engineer (9)
- Michael Teaney – Assistant Engineer (9)
- Nathan Young – Vocal Arrangements (9)
- Quentin Dennard II – Recording Engineer (7)
- Richard Smallwood – Vocal Arrangements (9)
- Rob Shelby – Assistant Engineer (9), Pro Tools Engineer
- Sean Harley – Pro Tools Engineer
- Sanchez Harley – Musical Arrangements, Audio Mixing (9), Recording Engineer (Vocals & Instrumental Overdubs on 9)
- Steve Beers – Assistant Mixing

== Charts ==
Chart (2011)	Peak position
US Billboard 200	54
US Top R&B/Hip-Hop Albums (Billboard)	15
