= Aretha Now =

1968 studio album by Aretha Franklin

Studio album by Aretha Franklin
- Released: June 14, 1968
- Recorded: December 1967 – April 1968
- Studios: Atlantic Studios, (New York City, New York)
- Genre: Soul
- Length: 29:23
- Label: Atlantic (#8186)
- Producer: Jerry Wexler

Aretha Franklin chronology
| Lady Soul (1968) | Aretha Now (1968) | Aretha in Paris (1968) |

Singles from Aretha Now
- 1. "Think"/"You Send Me" Released: May 2, 1968; 2. "I Say a Little Prayer" Released: July 26, 1968; 3. "I Can't See Myself Leaving You" Released: April 7, 1969

Professional ratings
Review scores
| Source | Rating |
|---|---|
| AllMusic | 4.5/5 stars |
| The Encyclopedia of Popular Music | 5/5 stars |
| The Rolling Stone Album Guide | 3.5/5 stars |

Aretha Now is the thirteenth album by the American singer Aretha Franklin, released on June 14, 1968, by Atlantic Records. Quickly certified Gold, it eventually reached a million in US sales. It hit No. 3 on Billboard's album chart, and became her highest chart success in the UK at No. 6.

In 1993, it was reissued on CD through Rhino Records. The album was rated the 133rd best album of the 1960s by Pitchfork. Mojo Magazine listed it as Franklin's sixth best album.

== Track listing ==
Information is based on the album's liner notes

Side one
| No. | Title | Writer(s) | Length |
|---|---|---|---|
| 1. | "Think" | Aretha Franklin, Ted White | 2:19 |
| 2. | "I Say a Little Prayer" | Burt Bacharach, Hal David | 3:36 |
| 3. | "See Saw" | Don Covay, Steve Cropper | 2:46 |
| 4. | "Night Time Is the Right Time" | Nappy Brown | 4:50 |
| 5. | "You Send Me" | Sam Cooke | 2:29 |

Side two
| No. | Title | Writer(s) | Length |
|---|---|---|---|
| 6. | "You're a Sweet Sweet Man" | Ronnie Shannon | 2:19 |
| 7. | "I Take What I Want" | Isaac Hayes, Mabon "Teenie" Hodges, David Porter | 2:33 |
| 8. | "Hello Sunshine" | King Curtis, Ronnie Miller | 3:03 |
| 9. | "A Change" | Dorian Burton, Clyde Otis | 2:27 |
| 10. | "I Can't See Myself Leaving You" | Shannon | 3:01 |

== Personnel ==
Information is based on the album's liner notes

- Aretha Franklin – lead vocals (all tracks), piano (1–5, 7, 10)
- Tommy Cogbill – guitar (1–3, 10), bass guitar (6, 8, 9)
- Carolyn Franklin – background vocals (6, 8, 9)
- Roger Hawkins – drums (all tracks)
- Jerry Jemmott – bass guitar (1–5, 7, 10)
- Jimmy Johnson – guitar (1, 3, 5, 6, 8–10)
- Bobby Womack – guitar (6, 8, 9)
- Spooner Oldham – Hammond organ (1, 5), electric piano (3, 6, 7, 10), piano (8)
- The Sweet Inspirations – background vocals (all tracks)
- Horns:
  - Floyd Newman – baritone saxophone
  - Willie Bridges – baritone saxophone (1, 3–5, 7, 10)
  - Charles Chalmers, Andrew Love – tenor saxophone
  - King Curtis, Seldon Powell – tenor saxophone
  - Bernie Glow, Wayne Jackson, Melvin Lastie, Joe Newman – trumpet
  - Haywood Henry – baritone saxophone (6, 8)
  - Tony Studd – bass trombone
  - Frank Wess – tenor saxophone, flute
- All arrangements by Tom Dowd and Arif Mardin
- Tom Dowd – engineering

== Charts ==
Billboard Music Charts (North America)

| Chart (1968) | Peak position |
|---|---|
| Pop Albums | 3 |
| R&B Albums | 1 |
| Jazz Albums | 9 |

== See also ==
- Album era
- List of Billboard number-one R&B albums of the 1960s
