= Amazing Grace (Aretha Franklin album) =

1972 live album by Aretha Franklin

Live album by Aretha Franklin
- Released: June 1, 1972
- Recorded: January 13–14, 1972
- Venues: New Temple Missionary Baptist Church, Los Angeles
- Genre: Gospel
- Length: 85:43
- Label: Atlantic
- Producers: Jerry Wexler, Arif Mardin, Aretha Franklin

Aretha Franklin chronology
Young, Gifted and Black (1972)	Amazing Grace (1972)	Hey Now Hey (The Other Side of the Sky) (1973)

Amazing Grace is a live album by American singer Aretha Franklin. It was recorded in January 1972 at the New Temple Missionary Baptist Church in Los Angeles, with Reverend James Cleveland and the Southern California Community Choir accompanying Franklin in performance. The recording was originally released as a double album on June 1, 1972, by Atlantic Records.

The album was a critical and commercial success, selling over two million copies in the United States alone and earning a double platinum certification. It also won Franklin the 1973 Grammy Award for Best Soul Gospel Performance. It remains the best selling disc of Franklin's entire recording career, as well as the highest selling live gospel music album of all time.

The arrangement of "God Will Take Care of You" was based on one recorded by The Gay Sisters in 1951. Cohen asserts: "The Gay Sisters' version of the song would've been the one that Franklin heard on the circuit, and (James) Cleveland would've been well aware of it because of his affinity for the (Gay) family."

Amazing Grace was remastered and re-released in 1999 as a two-compact disc set with many previously unreleased takes. A film of the same name documenting the making of the album premiered in 2018.

== Critical reception ==
Retrospective professional reviews
Review scores
Source	Rating
AllMusic	4.5/5 stars
Christgau's Record Guide	B+
The Encyclopedia of Popular Music	4/5 stars
The Great Rock Discography	7/10
MusicHound R & B: The Essential Album Guide	5/5 stars
The Rolling Stone Album Guide	5/5 stars

Reviewing for Rolling Stone in 1972, Jon Landau commented: "Amazing Grace is more a great Aretha Franklin album than a great gospel album. She plays havoc with the traditional styles but she sings 'like never before' on record. The liberation and abandon she has always implied in her greatest moments are now fully and consistently achieved." Landau found himself "struck first by the comprehensiveness and depth of the arrangement and then by the brilliance of her lead voice," hailing her performance as "a virtuoso display of gospel pyrotechnics, done with control and imagination." He was especially fond of the uptempo songs expressing "unqualified joy," saying they "hit with tremendous power."

Robert Christgau was less enthusiastic about the album, later writing in Christgau's Record Guide: Rock Albums of the Seventies (1981): "Because I don't think God's grace is amazing or believe that Jesus Christ is his son, I find it hard to relate to gospel groups as seminal as the Swan Silvertones and the Dixie Hummingbirds and have even more trouble with James Cleveland's institutional choral style. There's a purity and a passion to this church-recorded double-LP that I've missed in Aretha, but I still find that the subdued rhythm section and pervasive call-and-response conveys more aimlessness than inspiration. Or maybe I just trust her gift of faith more readily when it's transposed to the secular realm."

In another retrospective review, Ron Wynn of AllMusic regarded Amazing Grace as possibly Franklin's "greatest release ever in any style" and said, "Her voice was chilling, making it seem as if God and the angels were conducting a service alongside Franklin, Rev. James Cleveland, the Southern California Community Choir, and everyone else in attendance. Her versions of 'How I Got Over' and 'You've Got a Friend' are legendary."

Rolling Stone ranked the album number 154 on the 2020 reboot of their 'The 500 Greatest Albums of All Time' list.

== Track listing ==
=== 1972 double LP ===
Side one
No.	Title	Writer(s)	Length
1.	"Mary, Don't You Weep"	Spiritual	7:29
2.	"Medley: Precious Lord, Take My Hand / You've Got a Friend"	Thomas A. Dorsey, Frank Frazier / Carole King	5:34
3.	"Old Landmark"	W. Herbert Brewster, Adeline M. Brunner	3:40
4.	"Give Yourself to Jesus"	Robert Fryson	5:16

Side two
No.	Title	Writer(s)	Length
1.	"How I Got Over"	Clara Ward	4:22
2.	"What a Friend We Have in Jesus"	Joseph M. Scriven, Charles Crozat Converse	6:03
3.	"Amazing Grace"	John Newton	10:45

Side three
No.	Title	Writer(s)	Length
1.	"Precious Memories"	J.B.F. Wright	7:20
2.	"Climbing Higher Mountains"	Traditional	2:32
3.	"Remarks by Reverend C.L. Franklin"		1:56
4.	"God Will Take Care of You"	Traditional	8:48

Side four
No.	Title	Writer(s)	Length
1.	"Wholy Holy"	Marvin Gaye, Renaldo Benson, Al Cleveland	5:30
2.	"You'll Never Walk Alone"	Richard Rodgers, Oscar Hammerstein II	6:31
3.	"Never Grow Old"	Traditional	9:57

Note

- Adeline M. Brunner is also known as Herman Lubinsky.

=== Amazing Grace: The Complete Recordings ===
Information is based on this edition's liner notes

Disc 1
(Thursday Night Show - 1/13/72)

1. Organ Introduction (On Our Way) - Performed by Kenneth Lupper
2. Opening Remarks - Performed by Rev. James Cleveland
3. On Our Way - Performed by Southern California Community Choir
4. Aretha's Introduction - Performed by Rev. James Cleveland
5. Wholy Holy
6. You'll Never Walk Alone
7. What a Friend We Have in Jesus
8. Precious Memories - Featuring Rev. James Cleveland
9. How I Got Over
10. Precious Lord (Take My Hand)/You've Got a Friend
11. Climbing Higher Mountains
12. Amazing Grace
13. My Sweet Lord (Instrumental)
14. Give Yourself to Jesus

Disc 2
(Friday Night Show - 1/14/72)

1. Organ Introduction (On Our Way)/Opening Remarks
  Performed by Ken Lupper and Rev. James Cleveland
2. On Our Way - Performed by Southern California Community Choir
3. Aretha's Introduction - Performed by Rev. James Cleveland
4. What a Friend We Have in Jesus
5. Wholy Holy
6. Climbing Higher Mountains
7. God Will Take Care of You
8. Old Landmark
9. Mary Don't You Weep
10. Never Grow Old
11. Remarks by Rev. C.L. Franklin - Featuring Rev. James Cleveland
12. Precious Memories - Featuring Rev. James Cleveland
13. My Sweet Lord (Instrumental)

Note

- Unless otherwise indicated, all tracks (except for "Remarks by Rev. C.L. Franklin") are performed by Aretha Franklin.
- "Give Yourself to Jesus" on the 2 disc 'The Complete Recordings' was actually recorded on the night of January 14, and was included at the end of the first disc due to disc length restrictions.

== Documentary ==
Amazing Grace, a documentary/concert film directed by Sydney Pollack for Warner Bros., was set to be released as part of a double bill with Super Fly in 1972. However, Pollack was unable to complete the film because he had not used a clapperboard to synchronize the picture and sound at the beginning of each take. The film ended up in the studio vaults for over 38 years. Before Pollack's death in 2008, he turned the footage over to producer Alan Elliott, who after two years succeeded in synchronizing the picture and sound and completing the film.

Elliott first planned to release the film in 2011, but was prevented from doing so when Franklin sued him for using her likeness without permission. However, Franklin's original contract for the film was later discovered at Warner Bros., and Elliott planned to show the film at the Telluride Film Festival, Toronto International Film Festival, and Chicago International Film Festival in 2015. Franklin once again sued and was granted an emergency injunction against the Telluride screening, saying she had not given permission to screen the footage. Franklin issued a statement saying, "Justice, respect and what is right prevailed and one's right to own their own self-image." Due to the ongoing litigation, the film was then removed from the schedules of both the Chicago and Toronto festivals as well.

The film premiered on November 12, 2018, three months after Franklin's death.

== Personnel ==
Unless otherwise indicated, information is based on the album's liner notes:

=== Musicians ===
- Aretha Franklin – piano (D5, D7, celesta on B6), lead vocals
- Rev. James Cleveland – piano (A1-B5, B7, C1-C4, D6, D7), lead vocals (C1)
- Cornell Dupree – guitar
- Rev. C.L. Franklin - vocals (C3)
- Kenneth "Ken" Lupper – organ, additional keyboards
- Pancho Morales – congas, additional percussion
- Bernard Purdie – drums
- Chuck Rainey – bass
- Southern California Community Choir – background vocals

=== Production ===
- Aretha Franklin - producer, musical arrangements
- Rev. James Cleveland - choir director
- Jimmy Douglass - assistant recording engineer
- Rev. Alexander Hamilton - assistant choir director
- Wally Heider - recording engineer
- Arif Mardin - producer, remixing, music editing
- Gene Paul - assistant recording engineer
- George Piros - assistant recording engineer
- Ray Thompson - recording engineer
- Jerry Wexler - producer

== Charts ==
Chart (1972)	Peak position
Canada Top Albums/CDs (RPM)	23
US Billboard 200	7
US Top R&B/Hip-Hop Albums (Billboard)	2

Chart (2018)	Peak position
US Top Gospel Albums (Billboard)	2
US Top Gospel Albums (Billboard) The Complete Recordings	1

Chart (2021)	Peak position
Japanese Albums (Oricon)	42
UK Christian & Gospel Albums (Official Charts)	3

Chart (2026)	Peak position
Hungarian Physical Albums (MAHASZ)	16

== Certifications ==
Region	Certification	Certified units/sales
United States (RIAA)	2× Platinum	2,000,000^{^}
^{^} Shipments figures based on certification alone.
