= Hey Now Hey (The Other Side of the Sky) =

1973 studio album by Aretha Franklin

Studio album by Aretha Franklin
- Released: June 25, 1973
- Recorded: April–August 1972
- Studios: Record Plant, Los Angeles, California.
- Length: 47:11
- Labels: Atlantic; Rhino
- Producers: Quincy Jones; Aretha Franklin

Aretha Franklin chronology
Amazing Grace (1972)	Hey Now Hey (The Other Side of the Sky) (1973)	The Best of Aretha Franklin (1973)

Professional ratings
Review scores
Source	Rating
AllMusic	3/5 stars
Christgau's Record Guide	B−
Ebony	mixed
Jazz Digest	positive
Rolling Stone	mixed

Hey Now Hey (The Other Side of the Sky) is the nineteenth studio album by American singer-songwriter Aretha Franklin.

Recorded in April, May, and August 1972 at the Record Plant in Los Angeles and released in mid-1973 by Atlantic Records, it was the first Atlantic album by Franklin to not be produced by Jerry Wexler, instead being produced by Quincy Jones. This album was originally planned to be a straight jazz album, as Jerry Wexler told both Mark Bego and David Ritz in their respective accounts of Franklin's life. However, as the sessions evolved, Franklin and Jones began embracing and incorporating pop, soul, and funk. More than 20 songs were recorded for the album. Eight previously unreleased recordings were issued on 2007's Rare & Unreleased Recordings from the Golden Reign of the Queen of Soul. 2021's Aretha compilation included an additional two unreleased recordings from the sessions, an alternate take of "Somewhere" and the work tape of "Angel".

The album was reissued on compact disc through Rhino Records in 1994. The song "Master of Eyes (The Deepness of Your Eyes)" was included as a bonus track on the 1994 reissue, being the only song from the sessions issued but excluded from the initial release in 1973.

== Reception ==
Commercially, Hey Now Hey was considered a failure. It was Franklin's first Atlantic album to miss the Top 25 of the main Billboard chart, peaking at number 30, and reaching number 2 on the R&B albums listing. The album's first offering, "Master of Eyes (The Deepness of Your Eyes)," was a miss, peaking at number 33 on the pop charts and number 8 on the R&B charts and was subsequently not included on the album. However, "Angel", written by Franklin's younger sister Carolyn Franklin, proved to be a redeeming entry, restoring Franklin to the No. 1 spot on the R&B chart and top 20 on the pop chart.

The album divided critics at the time. Rolling Stone praised Aretha's singing and certain moments but criticized Jones' productions and called the Aretha-written compositions as underdeveloped, anemic, and not measuring up to the standards she'd set for herself previously. Jazz Digest criticized the album's cover, but said that "Ms. Franklin is cooking her tail off here!" and complimented her as "the only emergent singer of the '60s with anything to say." Ebony called the album "a very mixed bag," but noted that "Angel" "presents Aretha at her best."

== Track listing ==
Side One

1. "Hey Now Hey (The Other Side of the Sky)" (Aretha Franklin) – 4:41
2. "Somewhere" (Leonard Bernstein, Stephen Sondheim) – 6:14
3. "So Swell When You're Well" (James Booker, Aretha Franklin) – 4:14
4. "Angel" (Carolyn Franklin, Sonny Sanders) – 4:26
5. "Sister from Texas" (Aretha Franklin) – 3:08

Side Two

1. "Mister Spain" (Carolyn Plummer) – 6:41
2. "That's The Way I Feel About Cha" (Bobby Womack, Jim Grisby, Joe Hicks) – 7:10
3. "Moody's Mood" (James Moody, Jimmy McHugh, Dorothy Fields) – 2:55
4. "Just Right Tonight" (Aretha Franklin, Avery Parrish, Buddy Feyne, Quincy Jones, Robert Bruce) – 7:42

CD reissue bonus track

1. "Master of Eyes (The Deepness of Your Eyes)" (Aretha Franklin, Bernice Hart) – 3:25

== Personnel ==
- Aretha Franklin – lead vocals, acoustic piano solo (2, 3)
- Spooner Oldham – keyboards
- Billy Preston – acoustic piano solo (9)
- Jimmy Johnson – guitar
- Tommy Cogbill, Jerry Jemmott – bass guitar
- Roger Hawkins, Richie Pratt – drums
- Phil Woods – alto saxophone (2)
- Joe Farrell – tenor sax solo (4), flute solo (6)
- Willie Bridges – saxophone
- Charles Chalmers – saxophone
- Andrew Love – saxophone
- Floyd Newman – saxophone
- Wayne Jackson – trumpet

=== Technical personnel ===
- Producers – Quincy Jones and Aretha Franklin
- Recording Engineer – Phil Schier
- Remixing – Gene Paul (track 1); Quincy Jones and Phil Schier (tracks 2–9).
- Track 1 remixed at Record Plant; tracks 2–9 remixed at Atlantic Studios (New York, NY).
- Mastered at Artisan Sound Recorders (Hollywood, CA).
- Album Design – Ken Cunningham, Jim Dunn and Aretha Franklin.
- Cover Illustration – Jim Dunn
