= Call Me (Aretha Franklin song) =

Single by Aretha Franklin

from the album This Girl's in Love with You
- B-side: "Son of a Preacher Man"
- Released: January 21, 1970
- Recorded: 1969
- Studio: Criteria Studios (Miami)
- Genre: Soul
- Length: 3:16 (single version); 3:57 (album version)
- Label: Atlantic
- Songwriter: Aretha Franklin
- Producers: Arif Mardin; Jerry Wexler; Tom Dowd

Aretha Franklin singles chronology
"Eleanor Rigby" (1969)	"Call Me" (1970)	"Spirit in the Dark" (1970)

"Call Me" is a song written and recorded by American singer Aretha Franklin. The song was co-produced by Jerry Wexler, Tom Dowd and Arif Mardin.

== Background ==
Franklin came up with the idea for the song after she saw a young couple engaged in deep conversation on New York's Park Avenue. Before they parted, Franklin heard them say to each other: "I love you... call me." With the exception of Franklin on piano, musical backing for "Call Me" was handled by members of the Muscle Shoals Rhythm Section.

== Chart performance ==
"Call Me" was released as a single in January 1970 from Aretha's This Girl's in Love with You album and became another hit for her, spending two weeks at number one on the US R&B Singles chart, while reaching number 13 on the Pop chart.

Chart (1970)	Peak position
Canada (RPM Top 100)	11
US Billboard Hot 100	13
US Billboard Best Selling Soul Singles	1

== Personnel ==
Credits are adapted from the liner notes of This Girl's in Love with You.

Main performance

- Aretha Franklin – vocals, acoustic piano, additional keyboards
- Brenda Bryant – background vocals
- Cissy Houston – background vocals
- Pat Lewis – background vocals

Muscle Shoals Rhythm Section

- Barry Beckett – electric piano, Hammond organ
- Roger Hawkins – drums
- Eddie Hinton – guitar
- David Hood – bass
- Jimmy Johnson – guitar

Production

- Ron Albert – engineer
- Tom Dowd – producer
- Chuck Kirkpatrick – engineer
- Arif Mardin – producer, arranger
- Jerry Wexler – producer

== Cover versions ==
- Diana Ross's rendition of the song for her 1971 album Everything Is Everything. This version was nominated for a Grammy in the Best Female R&B Vocal Category.
- In 1991, R&B singer Phil Perry recorded a version of this song for his album, The Heart of the Man, which reached number one on the Hot R&B Singles Chart.

== Sampling ==
Hip Hop duo Slum Village uses a sample of the song on their 2004 song, "Selfish” featuring rapper Kanye West (who also produced the song) and singer John Legend from their fourth Album “Detroit Deli (A Taste of Detroit)”

== See also ==
- List of Best Selling Soul Singles number ones of 1970
- List of Hot R&B Singles number ones of 1991
