= This Girl's in Love with You =

1970 studio album by Aretha Franklin

Studio album by Aretha Franklin
- Released: January 15, 1970
- Recorded: January 8–9, 1969; October 3, 1969; December 1969
- Genres: Soul, R&B
- Length: 35:45
- Label: Atlantic
- Producers: Jerry Wexler, Tom Dowd & Arif Mardin

Aretha Franklin chronology
Aretha's Gold (1969)	This Girl's in Love with You (1970)	Spirit in the Dark (1970)

Singles from This Girl's in Love with You
- 1. "Share Your Love with Me" Released: July 1969; 2. "Eleanor Rigby" Released: 1969; 3. "Call Me"/"Son of a Preacher Man" Released: January 21, 1970

Professional ratings
Review scores
Source	Rating
AllMusic	3/5 stars
Christgau's Record Guide	B+

This Girl's in Love with You is the sixteenth studio album by American singer Aretha Franklin, released on January 15, 1970 by Atlantic Records. It reached Billboard's Top 20 and sold modestly even with several big hits. Long out of print, it was reissued on compact disc through Rhino Records in 1993.

Her version of The Beatles' "Let It Be" was the first recording of the song to be commercially issued (The Beatles did not release "Let It Be" as a single until March 1970). Songwriter Paul McCartney sent Franklin and Atlantic Records a demo of the song as a guide.

== Track listing ==
Information is based on the album's liner notes

No.	Title	Writer(s)	Length
1.	"Son of a Preacher Man"	John Hurley; Ronnie Wilkins	3:19
2.	"Share Your Love with Me"	Al Braggs; Deadric Malone	3:21
3.	"The Dark End of the Street"	Chips Moman; Dan Penn	4:42
4.	"Let It Be"	John Lennon; Paul McCartney	3:33
5.	"Eleanor Rigby"	Lennon; McCartney	2:38
6.	"This Girl's in Love with You"	Burt Bacharach; Hal David	4:00
7.	"It Ain't Fair"	Ronnie Miller	3:22
8.	"The Weight"	Robbie Robertson	2:59
9.	"Call Me"	Aretha Franklin	3:57
10.	"Sit Down and Cry"	Clyde Otis; Lou Stallman	3:52

== Personnel ==
Information is based on the album's liner notes.

Main Performance

- Aretha Franklin – vocals, acoustic piano, additional keyboards
- Duane Allman – slide guitar, steel guitar (7, 8)
- Brenda Bryant – background vocals (9)
- Cissy Houston – background vocals (8–10)
- King Curtis – tenor saxophone (2, 4, 7, 8)
- Pat Lewis – background vocals (9)
- Sylvia Shemwell – background vocals (8, 10)
- The Sweet Inspirations – background vocals (1–3, 5, 7)
- Dee Dee Warwick – background vocals (8, 10)
- Jerry Weaver – guitar (4, 10)

Muscle Shoals Rhythm Section

- Barry Beckett – electric piano (all tracks), Hammond organ (all tracks)
- Roger Hawkins – drums (all tracks)
- Eddie Hinton – guitar (1, 3–6, 9)
- David Hood – bass guitar (all tracks) except for (8) "The Weight" which is Jerry Jemmott
- Jimmy Johnson – guitar (1–9)

== Production ==
- Ron Albert – recording engineer (3, 5–6, 9)
- Adrian Barber – recording engineer (4)
- Tom Dowd – recording engineer (1–2, 4, 7–8, 10), record producer
- Jerome Gasper – recording engineer (1–2, 4, 7–8, 10)
- Chuck Kirkpatrick – recording engineer (3, 5–6, 9)
- Arif Mardin – record producer, musical arrangement, string arrangement
- Jerry Wexler – record producer
