= I Can't See Myself Leaving You =

Single by Aretha Franklin

from the album Aretha Now
- B-side: "Gentle on My Mind"
- Released: April 1969
- Studio: Atlantic Studios (New York, NY)
- Genre: Soul
- Length: 3:00
- Label: Atlantic Records 2619
- Songwriter(s): Ronnie Shannon
- Producer(s): Jerry Wexler

Aretha Franklin singles chronology
"The Weight" (1969)	"I Can't See Myself Leaving You" (1969)	"Share Your Love with Me" (1969)

"I Can't See Myself Leaving You" is a song written by Ronnie Shannon and performed by Aretha Franklin. The song reached #3 on the U.S. R&B chart and #28 on the Billboard Hot 100 in 1969. The song was produced by Jerry Wexler and appeared as the closing track on Franklin's 1968 album Aretha Now.

== Chart performance ==
=== Aretha Franklin ===
Chart	Peak position
U.S. R&B chart	3
Billboard Hot 100	28
