= Spirit in the Dark (song) =

Single by Aretha Franklin

from the album Spirit in the Dark
- B-side: "The Thrill Is Gone"
- Released: August 1970
- Studio: Criteria Studios (Miami, FL)
- Genre: Soul
- Length: 3:59
- Label: Atlantic Records 2731
- Songwriter(s): Aretha Franklin
- Producer(s): Arif Mardin, Jerry Wexler, Tom Dowd

Aretha Franklin singles chronology
"Call Me" (1970)	"Spirit in the Dark" (1970)	"Don't Play That Song (You Lied)" (1970)

"Spirit in the Dark" is a song written and performed by Aretha Franklin. The song was produced by Arif Mardin, Jerry Wexler, and Tom Dowd.

== Background ==
Aretha Franklin's recording of "Spirit in the Dark" features the Dixie Flyers. The song appeared on her 1970 album, Spirit in the Dark.

== Chart performance ==
The song reached #3 on the U.S. R&B chart and #23 on the Billboard Hot 100 in 1970.

=== Aretha Franklin ===
Chart	Peak position
U.S. R&B chart	3
Billboard Hot 100	23
