= Soul '69 =

1969 studio album by Aretha Franklin

Studio album by Aretha Franklin
- Released: January 17, 1969
- Recorded: April 17–18 and September 23–27, 1968
- Studios: Atlantic Studios, (New York City, New York)
- Genres: Soul, jazz
- Length: 40:49
- Labels: Atlantic (#8212), Rhino
- Producers: Tom Dowd, Jerry Wexler

Aretha Franklin chronology
Aretha in Paris (1968)	Soul '69 (1969)	Soft and Beautiful (1969)

Singles from Soul '69
- 1. "The Tracks of My Tears" Released: 1969; 2. "Gentle on My Mind" Released: April 1969

Soul '69 is the fourteenth studio album by American singer Aretha Franklin. Released in 1969 by Atlantic Records, the album features cover material. It was her sixth album to reach number 1 on Billboard's R&B albums chart but ended her Top Five streak on the Pop side, stalling at number 15 on the national Billboard's Top Albums listing.

Two singles were issued but largely unsuccessful: "Tracks of My Tears", which reached number 21 on "Black Singles" and number 71 on "Pop Singles", and "Gentle on My Mind", which charted at number 50 and number 76 respectively. The album was re-released on compact disc through Rhino Records in the 1990s after many years out of print.

== Critical reception ==
Professional ratings
Review scores
Source	Rating
AllMusic	4.5/5 stars
The Encyclopedia of Popular Music	4/5 stars
Rolling Stone	(positive)

The album was critically well received. Music journalist Stanley Booth wrote in Rolling Stone that Soul '69 was "quite possibly the best record to appear in the last five years", describing it as "excellent in ways in which pop music hasn't been since the Beatles spear-headed the renaissance of rock". In spite of critical praise and popular success, however, the album has sunk into obscurity, becoming one of what journalist Richie Unterberger terms as "[Aretha Franklin's] most overlooked '60s albums".

== Track listing ==
Side one
No.	Title	Writer(s)	Length
1.	"Ramblin'"	Big Maybelle	3:10
2.	"Today I Sing the Blues"	Curtis Reginald Lewis	4:25
3.	"River's Invitation"	Percy Mayfield	2:40
4.	"Pitiful"	Rose Marie McCoy, Charlie Singleton	3:04
5.	"Crazy He Calls Me"	Bob Russell, Carl Sigman	3:28
6.	"Bring It On Home to Me"	Sam Cooke	3:45

Side two
No.	Title	Writer(s)	Length
7.	"Tracks of My Tears"	Smokey Robinson, Pete Moore, Marv Tarplin	2:56
8.	"If You Gotta Make a Fool of Somebody"	Rudy Clark	3:08
9.	"Gentle on My Mind"	John Hartford	2:28
10.	"So Long"	Russ Morgan, Remus Harris, Irving Melsher	4:36
11.	"I'll Never Be Free"	Bennie Benjamin, George David Weiss	4:15
12.	"Elusive Butterfly"	Bob Lind	2:45

== Personnel ==
- Aretha Franklin – vocals, piano (2, 7, 9)
- Junior Mance – piano (1, 3–6, 8–11)
- Spooner Oldham – organ (2, 7)
- Joe Zawinul – organ (5), piano, Fender Rhodes (6, 12)
- Kenny Burrell – guitar (1, 3–6, 8–11)
- Jimmy Johnson – guitar (2, 7)
- Ron Carter – bass guitar (1, 3–6, 8–12)
- Jerry Jemmott – bass guitar (2, 7)
- Tommy Cogbill – bass guitar (2, 7)
- Bruno Carr – drums (1, 3–6, 8, 9, 12)
- Roger Hawkins – drums (2, 7)
- Grady Tate – drums (10, 11)
- Jack Jennings – vibraphone (5, 7, 9, 12)
- Louie Goicdecha, Manuel Gonzales – percussion (5, 7, 12)
- David Newman – tenor saxophone, flute
- King Curtis, Seldon Powell – tenor saxophone
- George Dorsey, Frank Wess – alto saxophone
- Pepper Adams – baritone saxophone
- Joe Newman, Bernie Glow, Richard Williams, Snooky Young, Ernie Royal – trumpet
- Jimmy Cleveland, Urbie Green, Benny Powell, Thomas Mitchell – trombone
- Evelyn Greene, Wyline Ivy – backing vocals
- Produced by Jerry Wexler and Tom Dowd
- Arrangements by Arif Mardin

== See also ==
- List of Billboard number-one R&B albums of the 1960s
