= Son of a Preacher Man =

1968 song recorded by British singer Dusty Springfield

Single by Dusty Springfield

from the album Dusty in Memphis
- B-side: "Just a Little Lovin'"
- Released: November 8, 1968
- Recorded: September 1968
- Studio: American (Memphis, Tennessee)
- Genre: R&B; soul; country
- Length: 2:29
- Label: Atlantic (US); Philips (international)
- Songwriter: John Hurley and Ronnie Wilkins
- Producers: Jerry Wexler; Arif Mardin; Tom Dowd

Dusty Springfield singles chronology
"Don't Forget About Me" (1969)	"Son of a Preacher Man" (1968)	"Willie & Laura Mae Jones" (1969)

"Son of a Preacher Man" is a song written and composed by American songwriters John Hurley and Ronnie Wilkins and recorded by British singer Dusty Springfield in September 1968 for the album Dusty in Memphis.

Springfield's version was produced by Jerry Wexler, Tom Dowd, and Arif Mardin for her first album for the Atlantic Records label. The single, released in late 1968 and credited as "Son-of-a Preacher Man" on UK, US and other releases, became an international hit, reaching No. 9 in the UK singles chart and No. 10 on Billboard's Hot 100 in January 1969. The album Dusty in Memphis was released in stereo, though its singles were remixed and released in mono.

"Son of a Preacher Man" was Springfield's last Top 30 hit until 1987, when her collaboration with UK synthpop duo the Pet Shop Boys yielded the huge hit "What Have I Done to Deserve This?". "Son of a Preacher Man" found a new audience when it was included on the soundtrack of Quentin Tarantino's 1994 film Pulp Fiction; a re-release of the single reached number one in Iceland in 1995.

== Origins ==
In 1968, songwriters John Hurley and Ronnie Wilkins (who had recently had a hit with "Love of the Common People") wrote the song with Aretha Franklin in mind, according to a 2009 interview with Wilkins. Atlantic Records producer and co-owner Jerry Wexler, who was recording Dusty Springfield's first Atlantic album in Memphis at the time, liked the song and suggested it to Springfield for the Dusty in Memphis album.

Following Springfield's top-10 single release, the song was recorded in 1969 by Franklin for her This Girl's in Love with You album. Franklin's version also appeared as the B-side of her hit single "Call Me". Franklin's older sister Erma Franklin also recorded the song and included it on her 1969 Brunswick album Soul Sister.

== Reception and legacy ==
Cash Box said that Springfield "shows a new soul" and that the song is "brim-full of the special southern-combo sound and a vocal strongly influenced by Aretha [Franklin]."

The writers of Rolling Stone magazine placed Dusty Springfield's recording at number 77 among "The 100 Best Singles of the Last 25 Years" in 1987. The record was placed at number 43 among the "Greatest Singles of All Time" by the writers of New Musical Express in 2002, and in 2004, the song was on the Rolling Stone list of "The 500 Greatest Songs of All Time".

In 1994, the song was featured in a scene of the film Pulp Fiction. "Son of a Preacher Man" helped to sell more than two million units of the film's soundtrack, and to help it reach number six on the charts, according to SoundScan. Quentin Tarantino has been quoted, on the "Collectors Edition" DVD of Pulp Fiction, as saying that he probably would not have filmed the scene in which the song is featured had he not been able to use it.

In 2001, Emma Wilkinson's UK television performance of "Son of a Preacher Man" won the Grand Final of the talent show Stars in Their Eyes garnering the most votes from 15 million television viewers.

Samples from "Son of a Preacher Man" were used on Cypress Hill's "Hits from the Bong" on their album Black Sunday. The song is also featured in the 2016 video game Mafia III.

== Charts ==
Chart (1968–1969)	Peak position
Australian Go-Set	6
Ö3 Austria Top 40	10
Belgian BRT Top 30	23
Canada RPM Magazine	11
Dutch Single Top 100	4
Dutch Top 40	6
French SNEP Chart	115
German Media Control	38
Irish Singles Charts	11
Malaysian Singles Chart (Radio Malaysia)	2
New Zealand Singles Chart	7
Singapore Singles Charts (Radio Singapore)	1
Swiss Singles Top 75	3
UK Singles Chart	9
US Billboard Hot 100	10

Chart (1995)	Peak position
Icelandic Singles Chart	1

== Certifications ==
Region	Certification	Certified units/sales
Denmark (IFPI Danmark)	Platinum	90,000^{‡}
Germany (BVMI)	Gold	300,000^{‡}
Italy (FIMI)	Gold	25,000^{‡}
New Zealand (RMNZ)	4× Platinum	120,000^{‡}
Spain (Promusicae)	Platinum	60,000^{‡}
United Kingdom (BPI)	2× Platinum	1,200,000^{‡}
^{‡} Sales+streaming figures based on certification alone.

== See also ==
- Preacher's kid
