= The House That Jack Built (Aretha Franklin song) =

1968 single by Aretha Franklin

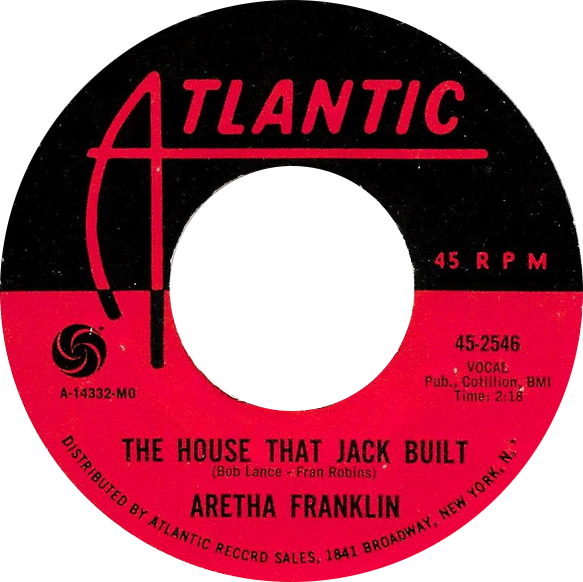
- Side A of the US single

Single by Aretha Franklin

from the album Aretha's Gold
- B-side: "I Say a Little Prayer"
- Released: July 1968
- Genre: Southern soul
- Length: 2:18
- Label: Atlantic Records 2546
- Songwriters: Bobby Lance, Fran Robbins

Aretha Franklin singles chronology
"Think" (1968)	"The House That Jack Built" (1968)	"See Saw" (1968)

"The House That Jack Built" is a song written by Bobby Lance and Fran Robbins, based on the British nursery rhyme and cumulative tale "This Is the House That Jack Built". It was first recorded by Thelma Jones and released on the Barry label in early 1968, but her version only peaked at #132 on the pop chart in the United States. Later that year, Aretha Franklin recorded the song, reaching No. 2 on the U.S. R&B chart and No. 6 on the Billboard Hot 100.

== Aretha Franklin recording ==
American singer Aretha Franklin recorded the song later in 1968. Her version reached No. 2 on the U.S. R&B chart and No. 6 on the Billboard Hot 100. The single's B-side, "I Say a Little Prayer", reached No. 3 on the U.S. R&B chart, No. 10 on the Billboard Hot 100, and No. 4 in the United Kingdom.

== Charts ==
=== Weekly charts ===
Chart (1968)	Peak position
Belgium (Ultratop 50 Wallonia)	7
Netherlands (Single Top 100)	4
US Hot R&B/Hip-Hop Songs (Billboard)	2
US Billboard Hot 100	6
West Germany (GfK)	34

== Covers ==
In 2012, Australian singer Christine Anu covered the song on her album Rewind: The Aretha Franklin Songbook.
