= Spirit in the Dark =

1970 studio album by Aretha Franklin

Studio album by Aretha Franklin
- Released: August 24, 1970
- Recorded: May 26–27, 1969; October 3, 1969 – March 10, 1970
- Studio: Criteria (Miami)
- Genres: Soul; R&B
- Length: 40:28
- Labels: Atlantic; Rhino (1993 re-release)
- Producers: Tom Dowd; Arif Mardin; Jerry Wexler

Aretha Franklin chronology
This Girl's in Love with You (1970)	Spirit in the Dark (1970)	Aretha Live at Fillmore West (1971)

Singles from Spirit in the Dark
- 1. "Don't Play That Song (You Lied)" Released: May 1970; 2. "Spirit in the Dark" / "The Thrill Is Gone" Released: August 1970

Professional ratings
Review scores
Source	Rating
AllMusic	4.5/5 stars
Christgau's Record Guide	A
DownBeat	5/5 stars
Pitchfork	9.0/10
Rolling Stone	(favorable)

Spirit in the Dark is the seventeenth studio album by American singer Aretha Franklin, released in August, 1970, by Atlantic Records. It received critical acclaim, but met with sloping sales, despite continued hit singles.

"Don't Play That Song (You Lied)" hit No. 1 R&B, No. 11 Pop, and was another million selling 45 for Aretha. "Spirit in the Dark", peaked at No. 3 R&B and No. 23 on Billboard magazine's Hot 100. This was Aretha's first Atlantic album to fall short of the Top 20 but is still considered one of Aretha's classic Atlantic LPs.

In 1993, Rhino Records returned the album to print on compact disc. "Try Matty's" is used as the jingle for radio host Matt Siegel's Boston Kiss 108 show.

== Track listing ==
Unless otherwise indicated, Information is based on the album's liner notes

Side one
No.	Title	Writer(s)	Length
1.	"Don't Play That Song"	Ahmet Ertegün, Betty Nelson	3:02
2.	"The Thrill Is Gone (From Yesterday's Kiss)"	Rick Darnell, Roy Hawkins, Art Benson, Dale Petite	4:41
3.	"Pullin'"	Jimmy Radcliffe, Carolyn Franklin, Aretha Franklin	3:38
4.	"You and Me"	Aretha Franklin	3:34
5.	"Honest I Do"	Jimmy Reed, Ewart Abner Jr.	3:19
6.	"Spirit in the Dark"	Aretha Franklin	4:03

Side two
No.	Title	Writer(s)	Length
7.	"When the Battle Is Over"	Jessie Hill, Mac Rebennack	2:43
8.	"One Way Ticket"	Aretha Franklin	2:52
9.	"Try Matty's"	Aretha Franklin	2:32
10.	"That's All I Want from You"	Fritz Rotter	2:44
11.	"Oh No Not My Baby"	Gerry Goffin, Carole King	2:55
12.	"Why I Sing the Blues"	B. B. King, Dave Clark	3:05

== Charts ==
Chart performance for Spirit in the Dark
Chart (1970)	Peak position
US Billboard 200	25
US Top R&B/Hip-Hop Albums (Billboard)	2

== Personnel ==
Information is based on the album's liner notes.

Main

- Aretha Franklin – vocals (5, lead on 1–4, 6–12), piano (1–6, 8–12)
- Margaret Branch – background vocals (1, 2, 7, 8, 11)
- Brenda Bryant – background vocals (1, 2, 7, 8, 11)
- Harold "Hog" Cowart – bass guitar (8, 9, 12)
- Dave Crawford – organ (8, 9, 12)
- Buzz Feiten – guitar (1)
- Duane Allman – guitar (7)
- Cornell Dupree – guitar (8, 11, 12)
- Jimmy O'Rourke – guitar (9)
- Evelyn Green – background vocals (3, 9, 10, 12)
- Wylene Ivy – background vocals (3, 9, 10, 12)
- Almeda Lattimore – background vocals (1–3, 9–12)
- Pat Lewis – background vocals (3, 9, 10, 12)
- Ray Lucas – drums (8, 12)
- Ron "Tubby" Ziegler – drums (9)
- The Sweet Inspirations – background vocals (4, 6)

The Dixie Flyers

- Sammy Creason – drums (1–2, 4, 6, 10)
- Jim Dickinson – additional keyboards (1, 2, 4, 6, 10)
- Charlie Freeman – guitar (1, 2, 4, 6, 10)
- Tommy McClure – bass guitar (1, 2, 4, 6, 10)
- Michael Utley – additional keyboards (1, 2, 4, 6, 10)

Muscle Shoals Rhythm Section

- Barry Beckett – keyboards (7, additional on 3, 5, 11)
- Roger Hawkins – drums (3, 5, 7, 11)
- Eddie Hinton – guitar (3, 5, 7, 11)
- David Hood – bass guitar (3, 5, 7, 11)
- Jimmy Johnson – guitar (3, 5, 7, 11)

== Production ==
Recorded at Atlantic South-Criteria Studios, Miami, Florida. Recording Engineers: Ron Albert, Chuck Kirkpatrick & Lewis Hahn. Produced by Jerry Wexler, Tom Dowd, Arif Mardin
