= See Saw (Don Covay song) =

Single by Don Covay and the Goodtimers

from the album See Saw
- B-side: "Never Get Enough of Your Love"
- Released: September 1965
- Genre: Soul
- Length: 2:57
- Label: Atlantic Records 2301
- Songwriters: Don Covay, Steve Cropper

Don Covay and the Goodtimers singles chronology
"Please Do Something" (1965)	"See Saw" (1965)	"Watching the Late Late Show" (1966)

"See Saw" is a song written by Don Covay and Steve Cropper and performed by Covay. The song reached No. 5 on the U.S. R&B chart and No. 44 on the Billboard Hot 100 in 1965. The song appeared on his 1966 album, See Saw.

== Aretha Franklin version ==
Aretha Franklin released a version of the song that reached No. 9 on the U.S. R&B chart, No. 14 on the Billboard Hot 100 and No. 12 on the Cashbox Top 100 in 1968. The song appeared on her 1968 album, Aretha Now.

== Other versions ==
Georgie Fame recorded the song for his 1966 album Sweet Things.

American jazz organist Dr. Lonnie Smith recorded an extended instrumental version on his 1969 album, Turning Point (Blue Note BST-84313); recorded at Rudy Van Gelder Studio on January 3, 1969.

== Chart performance ==
=== Don Covay ===
Chart	Peak position
U.S. R&B chart	5
Billboard Hot 100	44

=== Aretha Franklin ===
Chart	Peak position
U.S. R&B chart	9
Billboard Hot 100	14
Cashbox Top 100	12
