= Don Covay =

American singer-songwriter (1936–2015)

- Born: Donald James Randolph; March 24, 1936; Orangeburg, South Carolina, U.S.
- Died: January 31, 2015 (aged 78) Franklin Square, New York, U.S.
- Genres: R&B, rock and roll, soul, blues
- Occupations: Singer, songwriter
- Labels: Red Robin, Pilgrim, Atlantic, Sue, Big Top, Arnold, Columbia, Cameo-Parkway, Rosemart, Mercury, Philadelphia International, Newman
- Formerly of: The Rainbows

Donald James Randolph (March 24, 1936 – January 31, 2015), better known by the stage name Don Covay, was an American R&B, rock and roll, and soul singer-songwriter most active from the 1950s to the 1970s.

His most successful recordings include "Mercy, Mercy" (1964), "See-Saw" (1965), and "It's Better to Have (and Don't Need)" (1974). He also wrote "Pony Time", a US number 1 hit for Chubby Checker, and "Chain of Fools", a Grammy-winning song for Aretha Franklin. He received a Pioneer Award from the Rhythm and Blues Foundation in 1994.

Writing in the Washington Post after his death, Terence McArdle said, "Mr. Covay’s career traversed nearly the entire spectrum of rhythm-and-blues music, from doo-wop to funk."

== Early life ==
Covay was born in Orangeburg, South Carolina. His father, a Baptist preacher, died when Covay was eight. He resettled in Washington, D.C., with his mother Helen Zimmerman Randolph and his siblings in the early 1950s and initially sang in the Cherry Keys, (Note: Some sources give the name as Cherokees.) his family's gospel quartet. He crossed over to secular music as a member of the Rainbows and made his first recordings with that group in 1956.

== Career ==
Covay's solo career began in 1957 as part of the Little Richard Revue, when he worked both as the star's chauffeur and as an opening act. A single, "Bip Bop Bip", on which Covay was billed as "Pretty Boy", was released on Atlantic, produced by Little Richard and featuring his backing band, the Upsetters.

Over the next few years, Covay drifted from label to label, eventually signing with Columbia Records in 1961, but success remained elusive. Later that year, however, he had his first chart success, when "Pony Time", a song he co-wrote with fellow Rainbows member John Berry, reached No. 60 on the Billboard pop chart. It was issued by the small Arnold label and credited to his group, the Goodtimers. The song was later recorded by Chubby Checker and became a US No. 1 single.

In 1962, Covay had his first hit on Cameo-Parkway Records under his own name, "The Popeye Waddle", a dance-oriented track. He also started writing songs for Roosevelt Music in the Brill Building in New York City, writing a hit for Solomon Burke, "I'm Hanging Up My Heart for You". Gladys Knight & the Pips reached the US Top 20 with Covay's song "Letter Full of Tears", and Wilson Pickett recorded Covay's "I'm Gonna Cry (Cry Baby)" as his first single on Atlantic.

His singing career continued to falter until 1964, when he had one of his biggest pop hits on the small, Atlantic-distributed Rosemart label with "Mercy, Mercy". It was co-written with Goodtimers guitarist Ronnie Miller, which established Covay's earthy bluesy style, and featured a young Jimi Hendrix on guitar. The following year the song was recorded by the Rolling Stones for their album Out of Our Heads, on which Mick Jagger closely followed Covay's singing style.

Atlantic bought Covay's contract and minor R&B hits followed, but it was a year before Covay returned to the pop chart, with "See-Saw", co-written with guitarist Steve Cropper and recorded at Stax, along with "I Never Get Enough of Your Love", "Sookie Sookie" (both also co-written by Covay and Cropper), and "Iron Out the Rough Spots" (by Cropper, Booker T. Jones, and David Porter). His relationship with Stax's staff has been described as difficult, both with its musicians and with its management. Cropper ascribed it to a clash between executive Jim Stewart's more conservative persona and Covay's unpredictable creative character. Cropper emphasized his appreciation of Covay: "I loved Don to death. We get along great but I don't think Jim and them understood Don. He thinks in different areas and he was kind of driving people bananas." According to Carla Thomas, the musicians enjoyed working with artists sent by Atlantic, including Covay and Wilson Pickett, but resented having to give them studio time. On "See-Saw", Covay "achieved an even more powerfully soulful edge;" but he did not maintain momentum as a performer, and most of his later recordings for Atlantic failed to chart.

However, his songwriting continued to be successful, as he wrote songs for Etta James, Otis Redding, Little Richard (his 1965 hit, "I Don't Know What You Got but It's Got Me", for Vee-Jay and a couple of soul dancers for Brunswick, released in 1967), and notably Aretha Franklin, who had a hit in 1968 with "Chain of Fools", a song Covay had written some fifteen years earlier. Franklin won a Grammy for her performance. Over the years Covay's compositions have been recorded by such varied artists as Gene Vincent, Wanda Jackson, Connie Francis, Steppenwolf, The Daughters of Eve, Bobby Womack, the Rolling Stones, Wilson Pickett, Small Faces, Grant Green, Bonnie Raitt, and Peter Wolf, among others.

Covay organized the Soul Clan, a collective venture with Solomon Burke, Joe Tex, Ben E. King and Arthur Conley, in 1968, but it was relatively unsuccessful. In 1969, he joined former Shirelles guitarist Joe Richardson and blues and folk singer John P. Hammond to form the Jefferson Lemon Blues Band. The band's single "Black Woman" made number 43 on the R&B chart in 1970 and they recorded two albums: The House of Blue Lights and Different Strokes for Different Folks, before splitting up.

Covay joined Mercury Records in 1972, as an A&R executive, while also starting to record his album Superdude. The album yielded two of his most successful songs, "I Was Checkin' Out, She Was Checkin' In" and "Somebody's Been Enjoying My Home". He followed up with two more successful singles, "It's Better to Have (and Don't Need)" in 1973, his only hit as a performer in the UK, followed by "Rumble in the Jungle" in 1974, inspired by the boxing match between Muhammad Ali and George Foreman. In the late 1970s, he recorded for Philadelphia International Records but then withdrew from recording for several years, reappearing as a backing singer on the 1986 Rolling Stones album Dirty Work.

Covay had a stroke in 1992. The following year, Ronnie Wood of the Rolling Stones, Iggy Pop, Todd Rundgren and others performed on a Covay tribute album, Back to the Streets: Celebrating the Music of Don Covay. He was presented with a Pioneer Award from the Rhythm and Blues Foundation in 1994.

He released the album Adlib in 2000 on the Cannonball label, his first album in 23 years. Collaborating musicians included Paul Rodgers, Wilson Pickett, Lee Konitz, Otis Clay, Kim Simmonds, Ann Peebles, Syl Johnson, Paul Shaffer, Huey Lewis, and Dan Penn. The cover art was by Ronnie Wood.

== Personal life and death ==
In an interview published in the UK music weekly Record Mirror in 1967, Covay said, "Singing is my first love, but I like to express my thoughts in the songs I write as well as in the way I sing them. I am always looking for experiences we all know and try to relate them through both my writing and my singing."

Covay's wife, Yvonne Darby, died in 1981. A son, Donald Covay Jr., died in 2010.

Donald Covay died after a stroke on January 31, 2015, at the age of 78 at a hospital in Franklin Square, New York.

He was survived by his four children (Wendy Covay, Wanda Richardson, Ursula Covay Parkes, Antonio Covay), three brothers (Eddie Randolph, Thomas Randolph, Leroy Randolph), and five grandchildren.

== Discography ==
=== Albums ===
- Mercy! (1965)
- See Saw (1966)
- The House of Blue Lights (1969)
- Different Strokes for Different Folks (1972)
- Super Dude I (1973)
- Hot Blood (1975)
- Travelin' in Heavy Traffic (1976)
- Funky Yo Yo (1977)
- Adlib (2000)
- Super Bad (2009)

=== Chart singles ===
Year	Single Credited to Don Covay unless stated otherwise	Chart Positions		
Year	Single Credited to Don Covay unless stated otherwise	US Pop	US R&B	UK
1961	"Pony Time"; The Goodtimers	60	-	-
1962	"The Popeye Waddle"	75	-	-
1964	"Mercy, Mercy"; Don Covay & the Goodtimers	35	-	-
1964	"Take This Hurt Off Me"	97	-	-
1965	"Please Do Something"; Don Covay & the Goodtimers	-	21	-
1965	"See Saw"; Don Covay & the Goodtimers	44	5	-
1967	"Shingaling '67"	-	50	-
1968	"Soul Meeting"; The Soul Clan (Solomon Burke, Arthur Conley, Don Covay, Ben E. King, Joe Tex)	91	34	-
1970	"Black Woman"; Don Covay & the Jefferson Lemon Blues Band	-	43	-
1973	"I Was Checkin' Out, She Was Checkin' In"	29	6	-
1973	"Somebody's Been Enjoying My Home"	-	63	-
1973	"It's Better to Have (and Don't Need)"	63	21	29
1974	"Rumble in the Jungle"	-	83	-
1980	"Badd Boy"	-	74	-
