= Think (Aretha Franklin song) =

1968 single by American singer Aretha Franklin

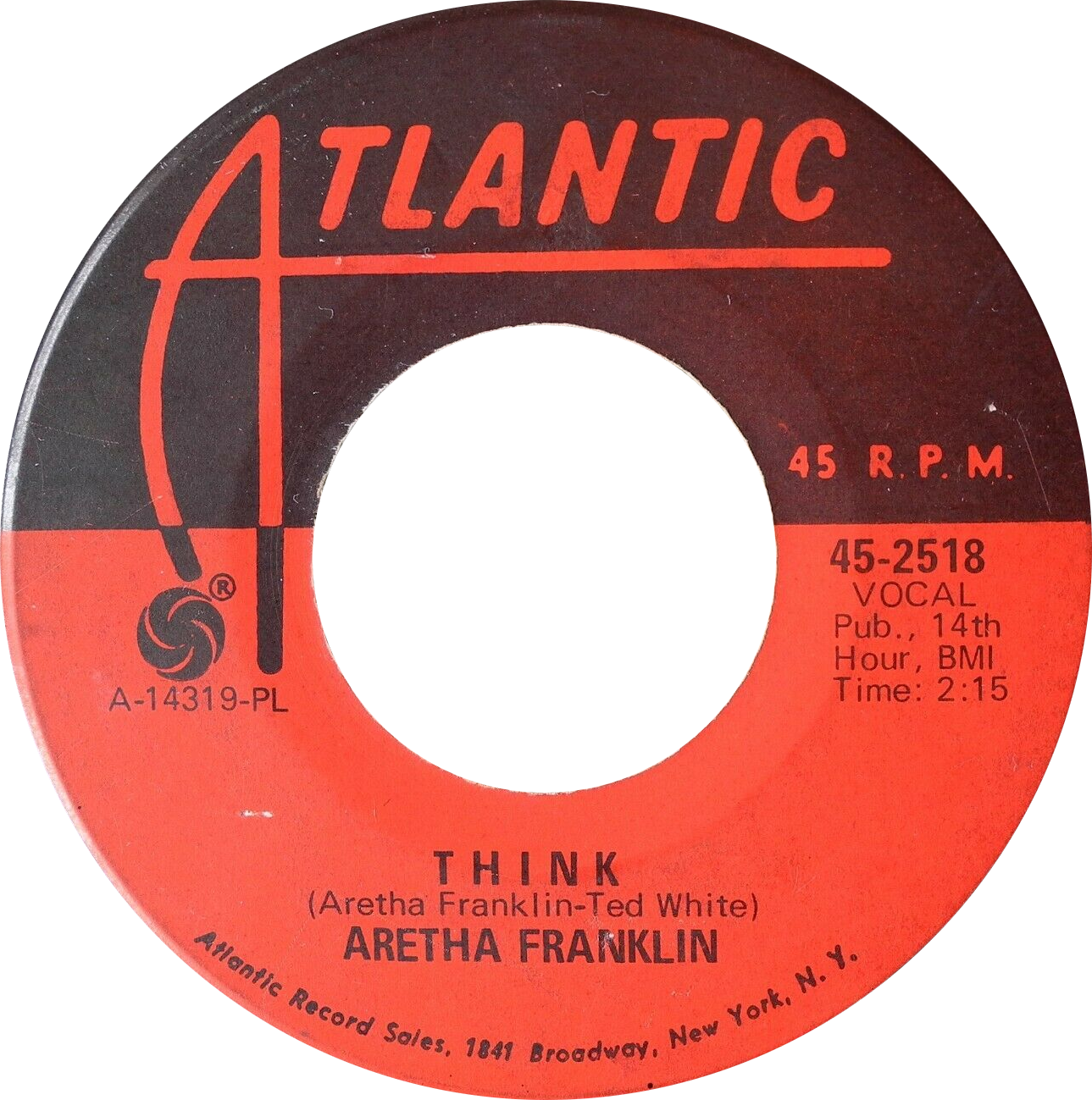
- Side A of the US single

Single by Aretha Franklin

from the album Aretha Now
- B-side: "You Send Me"
- Released: May 2, 1968
- Studio: Atlantic Studios (New York, NY)
- Genre: Soul; funk
- Length: 2:20
- Label: Atlantic 2518
- Songwriters: Aretha Franklin; Ted White
- Producer: Jerry Wexler

Aretha Franklin singles chronology
"Ain't No Way" (1968)	"Think" (1968)	"The House That Jack Built" / "I Say a Little Prayer" (1968)

"Think" is a song written by American singer Aretha Franklin and Ted White, and first recorded by Franklin. It was released as a single in 1968, from her Aretha Now album. The song reached No. 7 on the Billboard Hot 100, becoming Franklin's seventh top 10 hit in the United States. The song also reached number 1 on the magazine's Hot Rhythm & Blues Singles, becoming her sixth single to top the chart. Franklin re-recorded the song in the Atlantic Records New York studio for the soundtrack of the 1980 film The Blues Brothers and in 1989 for the album Through the Storm. Pitchfork placed it at number 15 on its list of "The 200 Greatest Songs of the 1960s".

Billboard described the single as a "pulsating swinger with another wild performance" that had a similar feel to "Respect" and which it expected would quickly reach a million sales. Cash Box said it has "wailing lyrics of a hard-luck love affair" and "tremendous rhythmic drive."

== Chart performance ==
Chart (1968)	Peak position
Canada Top Singles (RPM)	6
France (IFOP)	4
Netherlands (Dutch Top 40)	12
Netherlands (Single Top 100)	9
UK Singles (Official Charts)	26
US Billboard Hot 100	7
US Billboard Hot Rhythm & Blues Singles	1
US Cash Box	7
US Record World	7
West Germany (GfK)	32

Chart (2013)	Peak position
France (SNEP)	135

Chart (2018)	Peak position
France (SNEP)	112
Sweden Heatseeker (Sverigetopplistan)	8
Switzerland (Schweizer Hitparade)	77

== Certifications ==
Region	Certification	Certified units/sales
France (SNEP) Sales since 2019	Gold	100,000^{‡}
Italy (FIMI) with Otis Redding, sales since 2009	Gold	25,000^{‡}
New Zealand (RMNZ)	Gold	15,000^{‡}
Spain (Promusicae)	Gold	30,000^{‡}
United Kingdom (BPI)	Gold	400,000^{‡}
United States (RIAA)	Gold	1,000,000^{^}
^{^} Shipments figures based on certification alone.^{‡} Sales+streaming figures based on certification alone.

== Personnel ==
Credits are adapted from the liner notes of Aretha Now.

Musicians

- Aretha Franklin – lead vocals, piano
- Willie Bridges, Floyd Newman – baritone saxophone
- Charles Chalmers, Andrew Love – tenor saxophone
- Tommy Cogbill, Jimmy Johnson – guitar
- Roger Hawkins – drums
- Wayne Jackson – trumpet
- Jerry Jemmott – bass guitar
- Spooner Oldham – Hammond organ
- The Sweet Inspirations – background vocals

Production

- Jerry Wexler – producer
- Tom Dowd, Arif Mardin – arrangements
- Tom Dowd – engineer

== Versions ==
Franklin performed a new version of the song in a musical sequence of The Blues Brothers (1980). Because Franklin was not used to lip-syncing, this scene required a number of takes and considerable editing. A 3:15 version of the song appears on the film's soundtrack album. In addition to Franklin, the recording features the Blues Brothers band and backup vocals from Franklin's sister Carolyn and cousin Brenda Corbett.

Franklin recorded an updated 3:38 version titled "Think (1989)" for her 1989 album Through the Storm. It was produced and arranged by Arif Mardin with his son Joe Mardin. She re-recorded the song for Mothers Against Drunk Driving as a public service announcement during the late 1980s.

== Cover versions ==
Katharine McPhee's version of the song was released as a limited single from the American Idol 5: Encores (2006) album. The song became a minor Internet hit for McPhee—it was her first song to chart in the Pop 100, where it peaked at No. 90 due to download sales.

Chart	Peak position
US Billboard Pop 100	90

Adam Lambert made a cover version of "Think" for the soundtrack of DreamWorks Animation’s Captain Underpants: The First Epic Movie, released on June 2, 2017.

== See also ==
- List of number-one R&B singles of 1968 (U.S.)
