= Aretha Sings the Blues =

1980 compilation album by Aretha Franklin

Compilation album by Aretha Franklin
- Released: 1980
- Genre: Blues
- Length: 47:39
- Label: Columbia
- Producer: Clyde Otis

Aretha Franklin chronology
Aretha (1980)	Aretha Sings the Blues (1980)	Love All the Hurt Away (1981)

Aretha Sings the Blues is a compilation album of previously released Aretha Franklin recordings from Aretha's early 1960s tenure with Columbia Records.

== Reception ==
Armond White of Spin wrote, "Aretha had established a tradition that, as a revolutionary, she would naturally have to evolve away from (ask Bob Dylan). Aretha Sings the Blues shows Aretha's pregreatness style, wavering between Mahalia Jackson's command and Nancy Wilson's piquancy."

== Track listing ==
No.	Title	Writer(s)	Recorded on	Length
1.	"Drinking Again"	Doris Tauber; Johnny Mercer	February 8, 1964	3:29
2.	"Today I Sing the Blues"	Curtis Lewis	August 1, 1960	2:48
3.	"What a Diff'rence a Day Made"	María Méndez Grever, Stanley Adams	February 10, 1964	3:31
4.	"Without the One You Love"	Aretha Franklin	February 10, 1965	3:36
5.	"Trouble in Mind"	Richard M. Jones	February 10, 1965	2:55
6.	"Muddy Water"	Peter DeRose, Harry Richman, Jo Trent	February 10, 1965	2:32
7.	"Only the Lonely"	Sammy Cahn, Jimmy Van Heusen	July 16, 1964	4:54
8.	"I Wonder Where Are You Tonight"	Aretha Franklin, Ted White	June 13, 1963	3:15
9.	"Laughing on the Outside (Crying on the Inside)"	Ben Raleigh, Bernie Wayne	June 12, 1963	3:12
10.	"Take a Look"	Clyde Otis	June 14, 1963	2:41
11.	"Nobody Knows the Way I Feel This Morning"	Tom Delaney, Pearl Delaney	February 7, 1964	5:12
12.	""Evil Gal Blues""	Leonard Feather	February 8, 1964	2:43
13.	"This Bitter Earth"	Clyde Otis	February 10, 1964	3:37
14.	"Maybe I'm a Fool"	J. Leslie McFarland	January 10, 1961	3:14
Total length:				47:39

From the albums

- Unforgettable: A Tribute to Dinah Washington (1964): Tracks 1, 3, 11–13
- Aretha: With The Ray Bryant Combo (1960): Tracks 2, 14
- Yeah!!! (1965): Tracks 4–6
- Soft and Beautiful (1964): Track 7
- Laughing on the Outside (1963): Tracks 8, 9
- Soul Sister (1966): Track 10
