= The Queen in Waiting: The Columbia Years (1960–1965) =

Compilation album by Aretha Franklin
- Released: September 24, 2002
- Recorded: August 1, 1960 – October 12, 1965
- Genre: Jazz; R&B; gospel
- Length: 2:06:38
- Label: Legacy

Aretha Franklin chronology
Respect: The Very Best of Aretha Franklin (2002)	The Queen in Waiting: The Columbia Years (1960–1965) (2002)	Platinum & Gold Collection (2003)

Professional ratings
Review scores
Source	Rating
AllMusic (The Queen in Waiting)	3/5 stars
AllMusic (The Essential)	4/5 stars
AllMusic (The Essential 3.0)	3.5/5 stars

The Queen in Waiting: The Columbia Years (1960–1965) is a 2002 compilation album of Aretha Franklin's early recordings from 1960 to 1965 when she was signed to Columbia Records. It was repackaged as part of The Essential series in 2010, with a three-disc set containing eight additional songs also being released as The Essential 3.0.

== Background ==
The Queen in Waiting highlights Franklin's jazz and big-band recordings with Columbia before she became famous after she moved to Atlantic Records. Not knowing how to best utilize Franklin's talent, her producers had her record a mixture of jazz, blues, gospel, pop, and soul, and Columbia was criticized for mismanaging Franklin during her tenure with them. Collections such as this one and the more comprehensive Take a Look: Aretha Franklin Complete on Columbia are attempts to bring exposure to Franklin's catalog of early recordings.

== Track listing ==
=== Disc one ===
No.	Title	Writer(s)	Length
1.	"Nobody Like You"	James Cleveland	2:23
2.	"Once in a While"	L. C. Cook	2:31
3.	"Maybe I'm a Fool"	John Leslie McFarland	3:15
4.	"Muddy Water"	Harry Richman, Jo Trent, Peter De Rose	2:24
5.	"Bill Bailey, Won't You Please Come Home?" (alternate version)	Hughie Cannon	2:14
6.	"Hard Times (No One Knows Better Than I)"	Ray Charles	3:09
7.	"Today I Sing the Blues"	Curtis Lewis	2:41
8.	"Won't Be Long"	John Leslie McFarland	3:18
9.	"Nobody Knows the Way I Feel This Morning"	Tom Delaney, Pearl Delaney	5:10
10.	"Evil Gal Blues"	Lionel Hampton, Leonard Feather	2:41
11.	"Lee Cross"	Ted White	3:22
12.	"Walk On By"	Burt Bacharach, Hal David	2:50
13.	"I Wonder (Where Are You Tonight)"	Aretha Franklin, Ted White	3:21
14.	"God Bless the Child"	Billie Holiday, Arthur Herzog Jr.	3:03
15.	"Blue Holiday"	Willie Denson, Luther Dixon	2:54
16.	"Looking Through a Tear"	Arthur Resnick, Bobby Scott	3:03
17.	"Tiny Sparrow"	Bobby Scott	2:49
18.	"Here Today and Gone Tomorrow"	Babs Gonzales, Glen Ballard, Marti Sharron	3:29
19.	"Little Brown Book"	Billy Strayhorn	3:18
20.	"Without the One You Love"	Aretha Franklin	2:46

=== Disc two ===
No.	Title	Writer(s)	Length
1.	"This Bitter Earth"	Clyde Otis	4:34
2.	"Just for a Thrill"	Lil Hardin Armstrong, Don Raye	2:54
3.	"Skylark"	Johnny Mercer, Hoagy Carmichael	2:21
4.	"Skylark" (alternate version)	Johnny Mercer, Hoagy Carmichael	4:04
5.	"Trouble in Mind"	Richard M. Jones	2:43
6.	"Runnin' Out of Fools"	Kay Rogers, Richard Ahlert	2:43
7.	"Drinking Again"	Johnny Mercer, Doris Tauber	3:28
8.	"Laughing on the Outside (Crying on the Inside)"	Bernie Wayne, Ben Raleigh	3:16
9.	"What a Diff'rence a Day Makes"	Stanley Person, María Grever	3:31
10.	"Soulville"	Titus Turner, Morris Levy, Henry Glover, Dinah Washington	2:26
11.	"You'll Lose a Good Thing"	Huey P Meaux, Barbara Lynn	2:40
12.	"Take a Look"	Clyde Otis	2:42
13.	"Cry Like a Baby"	Jo Armstead, Nickolas Ashford, Valerie Simpson	2:13
14.	"I Wish I Didn't Love You So"	Frank Loesser	2:55
15.	"Only the Lonely"	Sammy Cahn, Jimmy Van Heusen	4:54
16.	"People"	Jule Styne, Bob Merrill	4:18
17.	"Mockingbird"	Inez Foxx, Charlie Foxx	2:48
18.	"Until You Were Gone"	Joy Byers	3:16
19.	"My Coloring Book"	John Kander, Fred Ebb	4:08
20.	"Try a Little Tenderness"	James Campbell, Reginald Connelly, Harry M. Woods	3:14

=== Limited edition 3.0 ===
No.	Title	Writer(s)	Length
1.	"(In My) Solitude"	Duke Ellington, Eddie DeLange, Irving Mills	3:50
2.	"Love for Sale"	Cole Porter	2:31
3.	"Ac-Cent-Tchu-Ate the Positive"	Harold Arlen, Johnny Mercer	2:18
4.	"Unforgettable"	Irving Gordon	3:40
5.	"All Night Long"	Curtis Lewis	3:06
6.	"Every Little Bit Hurts"	Ed Cobb	2:50
7.	"Sweet Bitter Love"	Van McCoy	3:00
8.	"If Ever I Would Leave You"	Alan Jay Lerner, Frederick Loewe	4:07

== Release history ==
Date	Label	Format	Catalog
September 24, 2002	Legacy	CD	C2K 85696
October 26, 2010	Columbia, Legacy	CD	88697 68830-2/88697 68830-2
