= Respect: The Very Best of Aretha Franklin =

Greatest hits album by Aretha Franklin
- Released: June 3, 2002
- Genre: R&B, soul
- Length: 2:35:48
- Label: Warner

Aretha Franklin chronology
Aretha's Best (2001)	Respect: The Very Best of Aretha Franklin (2002)	The Queen in Waiting: The Columbia Years (1960–1965) (2002)

Professional ratings
Review scores
Source	Rating
Allmusic	3.4/5 stars

Respect: The Very Best of Aretha Franklin is a 2002 greatest hits album by American soul singer Aretha Franklin. It was released on June 3, 2002.

== Track listing ==
Disc 1

1. "Respect" – 2:25
2. "Think" – 2:16
3. "Spanish Harlem" – 3:29
4. "(You Make Me Feel Like) A Natural Woman" – 2:45
5. "I Say a Little Prayer" – 3:33
6. "Son of a Preacher Man" – 3:16
7. "I Never Loved a Man (The Way I Love You)" – 2:49
8. "Chain of Fools" – 2:46
9. "Don't Play That Song (You Lied)" – 2:59
10. "Angel" – 4:27
11. "Border Song (Holy Moses)" – 3:20
12. "Rock Steady" – 3:12
13. "See Saw" – 2:43
14. "The House That Jack Built" – 2:19
15. "Oh No Not My Baby" – 2:51
16. "Until You Come Back to Me (That's What I'm Gonna Do)" – 3:25
17. "Good Times" – 2:06
18. "Since You've Been Gone (Sweet Sweet Baby)" – 2:22
19. "You're All I Need to Get By" – 3:34
20. "Ain't Nothing Like the Real Thing" – 3:47
21. "Do Right Woman (Do Right Man)" – 3:13
22. "Share Your Love with Me" – 3:18
23. "Something He Can Feel" – 6:15
24. "Ain't No Way" – 4:13

Disc 2

1. "Sisters Are Doin' It for Themselves" – 4:15
2. "I Knew You Were Waiting (For Me)" – 4:00
3. "Through the Storm" – 4:20
4. "Love All the Hurt Away" – 4:07
5. "Willing to Forgive" – 4:09
6. "Let It Be" – 3:29
7. "Never Let Me Go" – 2:52
8. "Night Time Is the Right Time" – 4:45
9. "Call Me" – 3:53
10. "Drown in My Own Tears" – 4:03
11. "People Get Ready" – 3:41
12. "My Song" – 3:29
13. "Dark End of the Street" – 4:40
14. "Today I Sing the Blues" – 4:22
15. "A Rose Is Still a Rose" – 3:58
16. "Who's Zoomin' Who" – 4:42
17. "Freeway of Love" – 4:10
18. "Day Dreaming" – 3:56
19. "Bridge over Troubled Water" – 5:34

== Charts ==
=== Weekly charts ===
Chart (2002–2018)	Peak position
Australian Albums (ARIA)	34
Danish Albums (Hitlisten)	16
Dutch Albums (Album Top 100)	22
Finnish Albums (Suomen virallinen lista)	13
German Albums (Offizielle Top 100)	96
Italian Albums (FIMI)	11
New Zealand Albums (RMNZ)	14
Norwegian Albums (VG-lista)	5
Scottish Albums (OCC)	24
Spanish Albums (PROMUSICAE)	16
Swedish Albums (Sverigetopplistan)	1
UK Albums (OCC)	15

=== Year-end charts ===
Chart (2002)	Position
UK Albums (OCC)	193
Chart (2003)	Position
Swedish Albums (Sverigetopplistan)	29

== Certifications ==
Region	Certification	Certified units/sales
New Zealand (RMNZ)	Gold	7,500^{‡}
Sweden (GLF)	Gold	30,000^{^}
United Kingdom (BPI)	Gold	100,000^{^}
^{^} Shipments figures based on certification alone.^{‡} Sales+streaming figures based on certification alone.
