= 1941 in country music =

This is a list of notable events in country music that took place in the year 1941.

== Events ==
- January 1 – Radio programmers begin a 10-month ban on the ASCAP catalog when they fail to reach an agreement. Instead, disc jockeys begin to rely on BMI and its catalog of "hillbilly" music.
- October – The Grand Ole Opry organizes a "Camel Country" tour in a show of support for American servicemen, many of whom would be off to war two months later.

== Top Hillbilly (Country) Recordings ==
The following songs achieved the highest positions in Billboard magazine's 'Best Sellers in Stores' chart, monthly 'Hillbilly Hits' chart, supplemented by 'Joel Whitburn's Pop Memories 1890-1954' and record sales reported on the "Discography of American Historical Recordings" website, and other sources as specified, during 1941. Numerical rankings are approximate.

Rank	Artist	Title	Label	Recorded	Released	Chart Positions
1	Gene Autry	"You Are My Sunshine"	Okeh 6274	June 18, 1941	July 10, 1941	US Billboard 1941 #131, US Pop #23 for 1 week, 1 total weeks, US Hillbilly 1941 #1, Hillbilly #1 for 20 weeks, 50 total weeks, 403 points, 1,000,000 sales
2	Ernest Tubb	"Walking the Floor Over You"	Decca 5958	April 26, 1941	May 28, 1941	US Billboard 1941 #154, US Pop #18 for 1 week, 1 total weeks, US Hillbilly 1941 #2, Hillbilly #1 for 10 weeks, 72 total weeks, 292 points, 1,000,000 sales (see 1942, 8 more weeks at #1), Grammy Hall of Fame 1998, presented gold record 1964.
3	Gene Autry	"Be Honest with Me"	Okeh 5980	August 20, 1940	January 17, 1941	US Billboard 1941 #147, US Pop #23 for 1 week, 1 total weeks, US Hillbilly 1941 #3, Hillbilly #1 for 6 week, 58 total weeks, 262 points, 1941 Best Original Song Nominee
4	Louise Massey and the Westerners	"My Adobe Hacienda"	Okeh 6077	January 27, 1941	March 1941	US Billboard 1941 #99, US Pop #13 for 1 week, 1 total weeks, US Hillbilly 1941 #4, Hillbilly #1 for 1 week, 21 total weeks, 107 points
5	Curly Hicks And His Taproom Boys	"Frisky Fiddler Polka"	Bluebird 8740	October 8, 1940	July 11, 1941	US Hillbilly 1941 #5, Hillbilly #4 for 2 weeks, 34 total weeks, 101 points
6	Gene Autry	"Tears On My Pillow"	Okeh 6239	August 22, 1940	June 12, 1941	US Hillbilly 1941 #6, Hillbilly #4 for 3 weeks, 41 total weeks, 100 points
7	Gene Autry	"You Waited Too Long"	Okeh 5781	August 22, 1941	September 5, 1941	US Hillbilly 1941 #7, Hillbilly #2 for 6 weeks, 21 total weeks, 95 points
8	Roy Rogers and his Saddle Pals	"New Worried Mind"	Decca 5906	November 29, 1940	December 29, 1940	US Hillbilly 1941 #8, Hillbilly #1 for 3 weeks, 15 total weeks, 90 points
9	Jimmie Davis	"I'm Sorry Now"	Decca 5926	February 21, 1941	March 12, 1941	US Hillbilly 1941 #9, Hillbilly #3 for 3 weeks, 27 total weeks, 84 points
10	Tennessee Ramblers	"Come Swing With Me"	Bluebird 8742	October 12, 1940	July 11, 1941	US Hillbilly 1941 #10, Hillbilly #3 for 4 weeks, 21 total weeks, 81 points
11	Rice Brothers' Gang	"My Carolina Sunshine Girl"	Decca 5959	March 11, 1941	April 1941	US Hillbilly 1941 #11, Hillbilly #3 for 5 weeks, 26 total weeks, 75 points
12	Karl And Harty	"Let's All Have Another Beer"	Okeh 6066	January 24, 1941	March 1941	US Hillbilly 1941 #12, Hillbilly #1 for 2 weeks, 15 total weeks, 72 points
13	Bob Wills and His Texas Playboys	"Take Me Back to Tulsa"	Okeh 6101	February 24, 1941	March 1941	US Hillbilly 1941 #13, Hillbilly #1 for 1 weeks, 19 total weeks, 72 points, Rock and Roll Hall of Fame 500
14	Delmore Brothers	"When It's Time For The Whip-Poor-Will To Sing"	Decca 5925	September 11, 1940	February 28, 1941	US Hillbilly 1941 #14, Hillbilly #1 for 1 week, 14 total weeks, 72 points
15	Bob Wills and His Texas Playboys	"Maiden's Prayer"	Okeh 6205	February 24, 1941	May 16, 1941	US Hillbilly 1941 #15, Hillbilly #1 for 3 weeks, 14 total weeks, 69 points
16	Roy Rogers and his Saddle Pals	"Time Changes Everything"	Decca 5906	November 29, 1940	December 29, 1940	US Hillbilly 1941 #16, Hillbilly #2 for 2 weeks, 21 total weeks, 69 points
17	Bob Wills and His Texas Playboys	"New Worried Mind"	Okeh 6101	February 24, 1941	March 1941	US Billboard 1941 #108, US Pop #14 for 1 week, 1 total weeks, US Hillbilly 1941 #17, Hillbilly #2 for 3 weeks, 17 total weeks, 64 points
18	Sons of the Pioneers	"Cool Water"	Decca 5844	March 27, 1941	April 25, 1941	US Billboard 1941 #142, US Pop #17 for 1 week, 1 total weeks, US Hillbilly 1941 #18, Hillbilly #1 for 1 weeks, 18 total weeks, 63 points, Grammy Hall of Fame 1986
19	Delmore Brothers	"She Won't Be My Little Darling"	Decca 5907	September 11, 1940	February 28, 1941	US Hillbilly 1941 #19, Hillbilly #2 for 2 weeks, 14 total weeks, 60 points
20	Texas Jim Robertson	"I'll Be Back In A Year (Little Darlin')"	Bluebird 8606	November 27, 1940	February 1941	US Billboard 1941 #204, US Pop #21 for 1 week, 1 total weeks, US Hillbilly 1941 #20, Hillbilly #1 for 1 weeks, 15 total weeks, 59 points
21	Adolph Hofner And His San Antonians	"Alamo Rag"	Okeh 6139	February 28, 1941	April 12, 1941	US Hillbilly 1941 #21, Hillbilly #1 for 1 weeks, 18 total weeks, 57 points
22	Louise Massey and the Westerners	"Beer and Skittles"	Okeh 5916	October 11, 1940	December 1940	US Billboard 1941 #129, US Pop #16 for 1 week, 1 total weeks, US Hillbilly 1941 #22, Hillbilly #1 for 1 week, 16 total weeks, 54 points
23	Bill Boyd And His Cowboy Ramblers	"If You'll Come Back"	Bluebird 8533	February 12, 1940	October 4, 1940	US Hillbilly 1941 #23, Hillbilly #2 for 1 week, 15 total weeks, 54 points
24	Tiny Hill and His Orchestra	"Spin The Bottle"	Okeh 6160	March 11, 1941	April 1941	US Hillbilly 1941 #24, Hillbilly #1 for 2 weeks, 14 total weeks, 53 points
25	Prairie Ramblers	"I'll Be Back In A Year (Little Darlin')"	Okeh 6053	January 22, 1941	February 1941	US Hillbilly 1941 #25, Hillbilly #1 for 2 weeks, 13 total weeks, 53 points
26	Ted Daffan and his Texans	"Those Blue Eyes Don't Sparkle Anymore"	Okeh 6160	March 11, 1941	April 1941	US Hillbilly 1941 #7, Hillbilly #1 for 2 weeks, 14 total weeks, 52 points
28	Bill Monroe and his Blue Grass Boys	"Mule Skinner Blues"	Bluebird 8568	October 7, 1940	November 10, 1940	US Hillbilly 1941 #28, Hillbilly #1 for 1 week, 17 total weeks, 47 points, Grammy Hall of Fame 2009
29	Shelton Brothers	"What's The Matter With Deep Elm"	Decca 5898	April 7, 1940	November 1940	US Hillbilly 1941 #32, Hillbilly #1 for 1 week, 15 total weeks, 46 points
31	The Jesters	"Repasz Band"	Decca 3719	April 2, 1941	April 1941	US Billboard 1941 #205, US Pop #21 for 1 week, 1 total weeks, US Hillbilly 1941 #30, Hillbilly #1 for 2 weeks, 11 total weeks, 44 points
32	Jimmie Davis and Jimmy Wakely	"Too Late"	Decca 5940	February 20, 1941	April 18, 1941	US Hillbilly 1941 #31, Hillbilly #1 for 1 week, 16 total weeks, 43 points

== Births ==
- January 18 – Bobby Goldsboro, middle-of-the-road artist best known for 1968's "Honey."
- February 8 – Henson Cargill, best known for 1968's "Skip a Rope" (died 2007).
- March 28 – Charlie McCoy, harmonica specialist.
- April 2 – Sonny Throckmorton, songwriter.
- May 31 – Johnny Paycheck, outlaw country-styled singer best known for "Take This Job and Shove It" (died 2003).
- June 8 — Alf Robertson, Swedish country musician (died 2008).
- August 14 – Connie Smith, female vocalist who grew to fame in the 1960s; Grand Ole Opry mainstay.
- September 21 – Dickey Lee, pop-country singer-songwriter.
- September 26 – David Frizzell, brother of Lefty Frizzell who grew into a country star in his own right.
- October 17 – Earl Thomas Conley, singer-songwriter who became one of country's biggest stars of the 1980s (died 2019).
- November 6 – Guy Clark, alternative-outlaw country singer-songwriter (died 2016).
- November 27 – Eddie Rabbitt, singer-songwriter who crossed over to pop in the early 1980s with hits such as "I Love a Rainy Night" and "Drivin' My Life Away" (died 1998).
- November 29 – Jody Miller, female vocalist best known for "Queen of the House" (answer song to Roger Miller's "King of the Road") (died 2022).

== Deaths ==
- November 7 – Henry Whitter, 49, early country musician.
