= Starvation/Tam Tam Pour L'Ethiopie =

Single by Starvation/Tam Tam Pour L'Ethiopie
- Released: March 1985
- Recorded: 1984
- Genre: Reggae; African
- Label: Zarjazz
- Producers: Jerry Dammers; Manu Dibango

"Starvation/Tam Tam Pour L'Ethiopie" is a double A-sided charity single released in 1985, and recorded by two charity ensembles formed specially for the occasion, also known as "Starvation" and "Tam Tam Pour L'Ethiopie" respectively. The aim was to raise money for the starving people of Ethiopia.

The idea of gathering artists together to make a charity record was copied from Bob Geldof's Band Aid project, which was number one in the UK charts at the time Starvation/Tam Tam was recorded in December 1984. Band Aid was criticised by some for featuring very few black musicians, and none at all from Africa. The Starvation/Tam Tam record was meant to rectify this.

"Starvation", a cover version of a Pioneers song, featured a number of musicians associated with the 2 Tone era (the group were originally going to be called "The 2 Tone All Stars"), including members of The Specials, Madness, UB40 and General Public, as well as The Pioneers themselves. It was produced by Jerry Dammers and recorded at Liquidator Studios in London.

"Tam Tam Pour L'Ethiopie" was recorded in Paris and featured an ensemble of African artists. Many of the musicians in question were from French-speaking countries, but lyrics in a number of African languages - including Douala, Lingala, Wolof, Malinke and Swahili - also featured on the record. It was produced by Manu Dibango.

The record was released on the Zarjazz label and reached #33 in the UK charts, marking the only time that a record to raise money for Africa actually featuring African artists has entered the UK Top 40.

The 12" version of the single featured a different mix of "Starvation", and a much longer two-part version of "Tam Tam Pour L'Ethiopie". Also featured is an exclusive track called "Haunted", which was written and produced by Dick Cuthell and performed by Dick Cuthell featuring Afrodiziak.

Proceeds from the record were distributed to the charities Oxfam, War On Want and Médecins Sans Frontières.

== Line-up ==
=== Starvation ===
- Vocals: Ali Campbell, Robin Campbell, Earl Falconer (UB40); Jackie Robinson, Sydney Crooks, George Agard (The Pioneers)
- Keyboards: Jerry Dammers
- Guitar: Lynval Golding
- Bass: Mark Bedford
- Drums: Daniel Woodgate
- Percussion: John Bradbury, Geraldo Darbilly
- Talking Drums: Gasper Lawal
- Cornet, Flugelhorn, Trumpet: Dick Cuthell
- Trombone: Annie Whitehead
- Additional vocals: Dave Wakeling
- Toasting: Ranking Roger
- Backing vocals: Lorenza Johnson, Claudia Fontaine, Caron Wheeler, Naomi Thomson (Afrodiziak)

=== Tam Tam Pour L'Ethiopie ===
- Guitars: Samba N'go, Souzy Kasseya, Ioroma Sika, Jerry Malekani, Francis M'bappe
- Saxophone: Manu Dibango
- Cora: Mory Kante
- Drums: Boffi Banengola
- Piano: Ray Lema
- Synthesizers: Poto Doubongo, Ray Lema
- Shekere: Brice Wouassi, Marcel De Suza
- Congas: Ismael Toure
- Percussion: Nino Gioia
- Talking Drums: King Sunny Adé
- Choir: Sylvie Etenna, Willy Ngeh Nfor, Kialla Peple, Mutela Shakara from the group Bobongo Star, Canat Ballou, Toni Mbaichi, Salif Keita and Tagus from the group Les Ambassadeurs, Yves N'Djocko, Sylvaine Amix, Florence Titty, Elolongue Sissi, Georgia Dibango, Valery Lobe, Dou Kaya, Touré Kunda, Bovick, Moona with the participation of Sarah, Sheena Williams
- Voices: King Sunny Adé, Zao, André Marie Tala, M'Pongo Love, Pamelo Mounk'a, Malopoets, Hugh Masekela, Youssou N'Dour
- Lyrics & Singing in Douala: Florence Titty, Elolongue Sissi, Georgia Dibango
- Lyrics & Singing in Lingala: M'Bamina
- Lyrics & Singing in Malinke: Salif Keita
- Lyrics & Singing in Wolof: Ismael, Sixu and Ousmane Touré Kunda
- Lyrics & Singing in Swahili: Bovick, Souzy Kasseya, Ray Lema

== Track listing ==
7"

1. Starvation: "Starvation" (Agard/Crooks/Robinson) - 3:00
2. Tam Tam Pour L'Ethiopie: "Tam Tam Pour L'Ethiopie" (Tam Tam Pour L'Ethiopie) - 4:15

12"

1. Starvation: "Starvation (African Version)" (Agard/Crooks/Robinson) - 4:40
2. Dick Cuthell featuring Afrodiziak: "Haunted" (Cuthell) - 4:18
3. Tam Tam Pour L'Ethiopie: "Tam Tam Pour L'Ethiopie (Part One)" (Tam Tam Pour L'Ethiopie) - 4:10
4. Tam Tam Pour L'Ethiopie: "Tam Tam Pour L'Ethiopie (Part Two)" (Tam Tam Pour L'Ethiopie) - 5:54
