= Somethin' Stupid =

1966 song written by C. Carson Parks

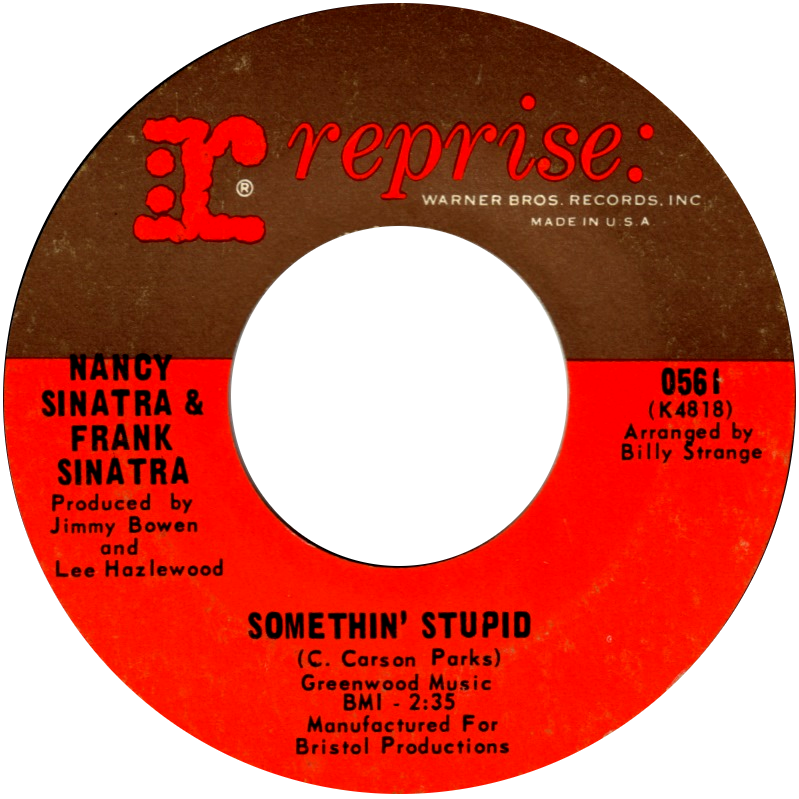
- US single A-side label

Single by Frank Sinatra and Nancy Sinatra

from the album The World We Knew
- B-side: "I Will Wait for You"
- Released: March 1967
- Recorded: February 1, 1967
- Studio: United Western Recorders (Hollywood, Los Angeles)
- Genre: Jazz pop
- Length: 2:37
- Label: Reprise
- Songwriter: C. Carson Parks
- Producers: Jimmy Bowen; Lee Hazlewood

Frank Sinatra singles chronology
"That's Life" (1966)	"Somethin' Stupid" (1967)	"The World We Knew (Over and Over)" (1967)

Nancy Sinatra singles chronology
"Summer Wine" (1967)	"Somethin' Stupid" (1967)	"Love Eyes" (1967)

"Somethin' Stupid", or "Something Stupid", is a song written by C. Carson Parks. It was originally recorded in 1966 by Parks and his wife Gaile Foote, as Carson and Gaile. A 1967 version by Frank Sinatra and his daughter Nancy Sinatra became a major international hit, reaching number one on both the Billboard Hot 100 chart and the UK Singles Chart. In 2001, a cover version by British vocalist Robbie Williams and Australian actress Nicole Kidman reached number one in the UK Singles Chart.

== Carson and Gaile version ==
In the early 1960s, Carson Parks was a folk singer in Los Angeles. He was an occasional member of The Easy Riders, and also performed with The Steeltown Three, which included his younger brother Van Dyke Parks. In 1963, he formed the Greenwood County Singers, later known as The Greenwoods, who had two minor hits and included singer Gaile Foote. Before the Greenwoods disbanded, Parks and Foote married and, as Carson and Gaile, recorded an album in 1966 for Kapp Records, San Antonio Rose, which included the song "Something Stupid". The recording was then brought to the attention of Frank Sinatra.

== Frank and Nancy Sinatra version ==
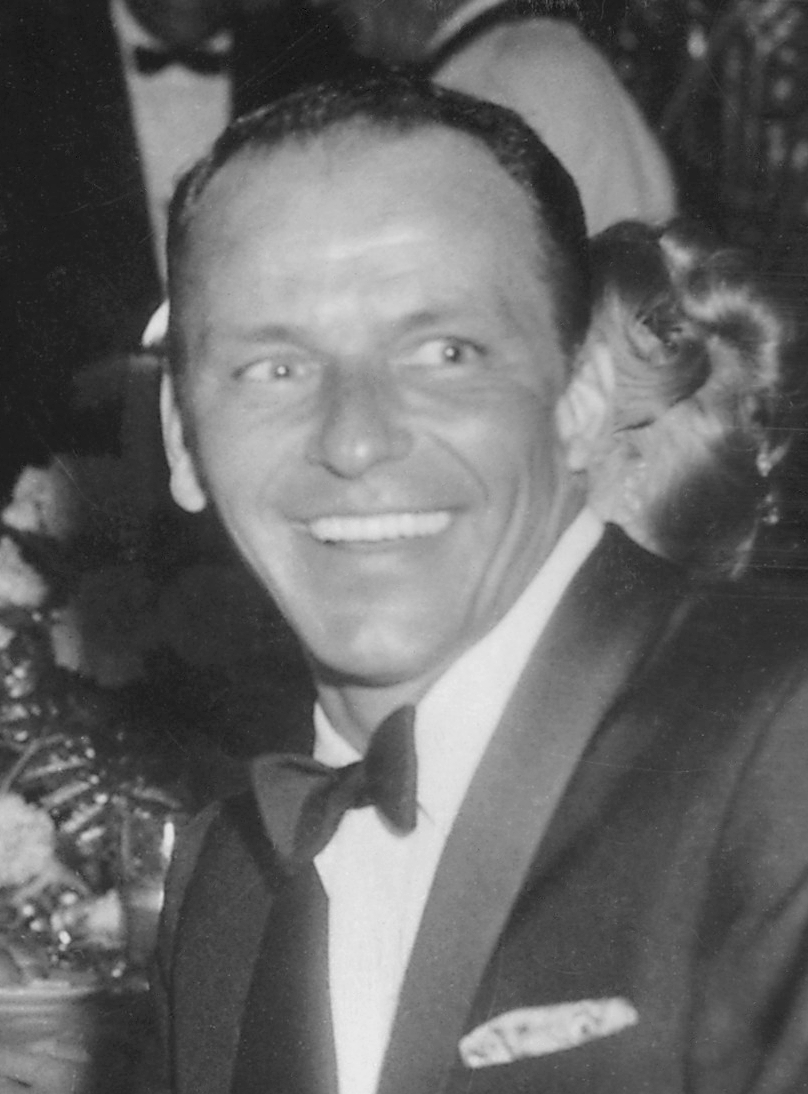
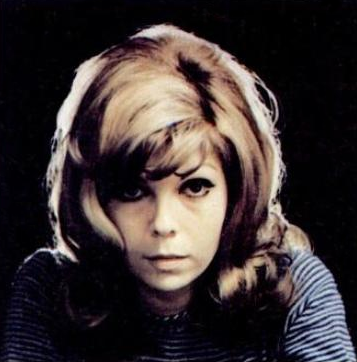
Frank (left) and Nancy Sinatra

The most successful and best-known version of "Somethin' Stupid" was issued in 1967 as a single by Nancy Sinatra and Frank Sinatra and subsequently appeared on Frank's album The World We Knew. Frank had played Parks's recording to his daughter's producer, Lee Hazlewood, who recalled, "He asked me, 'Do you like it?' and I said, 'I love it, and if you don't sing it with Nancy, I will.' He said, 'We're gonna do it, book a studio.'" Their rendition was recorded on February 1, 1967, after Frank had finished his collaboration with Antonio Carlos Jobim earlier in the day. Al Casey played guitar on the recording and Hal Blaine was the drummer. Hazlewood and Jimmy Bowen were listed as the producers of the single, with the arrangement by Billy Strange. As performers, Nancy's full name was listed on the label first, with the billing "Nancy Sinatra and Frank Sinatra."

The single spent four weeks at number 1 on the US Billboard Hot 100 chart and nine weeks atop the easy listening (now adult contemporary) chart, becoming Frank's second gold single as certified by the RIAA and Nancy's third. In Norway the single qualified for silver disc. It was the first and only instance of a father-daughter number-one song in America. Nancy Sinatra was quoted as sarcastically saying, "Some people call (Something Stupid) the Incest Song, which I think is, well, very sweet!". The single also reached number 1 on the UK Singles Chart the same year. It was also nominated for the Record Of The Year at the 10th Grammy Awards, losing to the 5th Dimension's upbeat hit song "Up, Up And Away".

=== Personnel ===
==== Vocalists ====
- Frank Sinatra – vocals
- Nancy Sinatra – vocals

==== Leaders ====
- Claus Ogerman – conductor
- Billy Strange – arranger, conductor

==== Instrumentalists ====
- Hal Blaine – drums
- Glen Campbell – guitar
- Alvin Casey – guitar
- Roy Caton – trumpet
- Victor Feldman – percussion
- Carol Kaye – electric bass
- Bill Miller – piano
- Oliver Mitchell – trumpet
- Donald Owens – piano
- Ralph Peña – string bass
- Orchestra includes 10 violins

=== Charts ===
==== Weekly charts ====
Chart (1967)	Peak position
Australia (Go-Set)	1
Austria	1
Canada RPM Top Singles	1
Ireland (IRMA)	1
Italy	20
New Zealand (Listener)	7
Norway	1
South Africa (Springbok)	1
UK	1
US Billboard Hot 100	1
US Billboard Easy Listening	1
US Cash Box Top 100	1

Chart (2026)	Peak position
Russia Streaming (TopHit)	99

==== Year-end charts ====
Chart (1967)	Rank
Australia (AMR)	6
Austria (Ö3 Austria Top 40)	11
Belgium (Ultratop 50 Flanders)	7
Canada	20
Netherlands (Dutch Top 40)	26
South Africa	8
UK Singles	9
US Billboard Hot 100	7
US Billboard Easy Listening	1
US Cash Box	13

=== Certifications ===
Region	Certification	Certified units/sales
Italy (FIMI) Since 2009	Gold	50,000^{‡}
New Zealand (RMNZ)	Platinum	30,000^{‡}
United Kingdom (BPI)	Gold	400,000^{‡}
United States (RIAA)	Gold	1,000,000^{^}
^{^} Shipments figures based on certification alone.^{‡} Sales+streaming figures based on certification alone.

== Ali Campbell and Kibibi Campbell version ==
"Somethin' Stupid"

Single by Ali Campbell and Kibibi Campbell

from the album Big Love
- Released: December 1, 1995
- Recorded: 1995
- Genre: Pop, jazz
- Length: 4:37
- Label: Virgin
- Songwriter: C. Carson Parks
- Producer: Stoker

Ali Campbell and Kibibi Campbell singles chronology
"Let Your Yeah Be Yeah" (1995)	"Somethin' Stupid" (1995)	"Hold Me Tight" (1993)

In 1995, Ali Campbell and his then 7-year-old daughter Kibibi Campbell covered the hit as a duet. After its release on the studio album Big Love, it can also be found on the compilation Silhouette.

=== Music video ===
The music video was shot in New York City. Ali Campbell and his daughter spend an afternoon in the city. They relax on the bench in the park, also walk through the city center, look through a sightseeing telescope, watch jugglers and fire breathers in a circus, figure skaters and stroll.

=== Charts ===
Chart (1995)	Peak position
UK Singles Chart	30
New Zealand Singles Chart	13

== Robbie Williams and Nicole Kidman version ==
"Somethin' Stupid"

Single by Robbie Williams and Nicole Kidman

from the album Swing When You're Winning
- Released: December 10, 2001
- Genre: Orchestral pop
- Length: 2:50
- Label: Chrysalis
- Songwriter: C. Carson Parks
- Producers: Guy Chambers; Steve Power

Robbie Williams singles chronology
"Better Man" (2001)	"Somethin' Stupid" (2001)	"Mr. Bojangles" / "I Will Talk and Hollywood Will Listen" (2002)

Nicole Kidman singles chronology
"Come What May" (2001)	"Somethin' Stupid'" (2001)	"One Day I'll Fly Away" (2002)

Music video
- "Somethin' Stupid" on YouTube

English singer Robbie Williams recorded a cover version of "Somethin' Stupid" as a duet with Australian actress Nicole Kidman. The song appeared on Williams's 2001 album, Swing When You're Winning, and was released as the album's lead single on December 10, 2001, topping the UK Singles Chart at the end of the year. The song was Christmas number one in the United Kingdom, and Williams's fifth number one overall. The single sold 400,000 copies to earn a gold certification from the British Phonographic Industry. The accompanying music video was directed by Vaughan Arnell.

The song was the 30th-best-selling single of 2001 in the UK. It also gave Williams another number-one hit in New Zealand, earning a gold certification, and charted inside the top 10 in several European countries. In Australia, it became Williams's fourth top-10 single, earning a gold certification for over 35,000 copies sold.

=== Track listings ===
UK and Australian CD single

1. "Somethin' Stupid" – 2:51
2. "Eternity" (orchestral version) – 5:32
3. "My Way" (live at the Albert Hall) – 7:00
4. "Somethin' Stupid" (video)

UK cassette single

1. "Somethin' Stupid" – 2:51
2. "Eternity" (orchestral version) – 5:32
3. "My Way" (live at the Albert Hall) – 7:00

UK DVD single

1. "Somethin' Stupid" (video) – 3:08
2. "Let's Face the Music and Dance" (audio) – 2:36
3. "That's Life" (audio) – 3:07

European CD single

1. "Somethin' Stupid" – 2:51
2. "My Way" (live at the Albert Hall) – 7:00

=== Credits and personnel ===
Credits are taken from the Swing When You're Winning album booklet.

Studios

- Recorded at various studios
- Mixed at Capitol Recording Studios (Los Angeles) and Air Lyndhurst Studios (London, England)
- Mastered at The Mastering Lab (Los Angeles) and Metropolis Mastering (London, England)

Personnel

- C. Carson Parks – writing
- Robbie Williams – vocals
- Nicole Kidman – vocals
- Mitch Dalton – guitars
- Dave Catlin-Birch – bass
- Ralph Salmins – drums
- Frank Ricotti – percussion
- Steve Sidwell – trumpet, arrangement, conducting
- Simon Gardner – trumpet
- Paul Spong – trumpet
- The London Session Orchestra – orchestra
- Gavyn Wright – concertmaster
- Guy Chambers – production
- Steve Power – production
- Al Schmitt – vocal recording
- Charlie Paakkari – assistant engineering
- Steve Genewick – assistant engineering
- Steve Price – assistant engineering
- Rupert Coulson – assistant mix engineering
- Ricky Graham – assistant mix engineering
- Mike Ross-Trevor – orchestral engineering
- Richard Flack – Pro Tools
- Doug Sax – mastering (The Mastering Lab)
- Tony Cousins – mastering (Metropolis)

=== Charts ===
==== Weekly charts ====
Chart (2001–2002)	Peak position
Australia (ARIA)	8
Austria (Ö3 Austria Top 40)	2
Belgium (Ultratop 50 Flanders)	5
Belgium (Ultratop 50 Wallonia)	6
Canada (Nielsen SoundScan)	25
Croatia (HRT)	8
Czech Republic (IFPI)	2
Denmark (Tracklisten)	6
Europe (Eurochart Hot 100)	1
Europe (European Hit Radio)	1
Finland Airplay (Radiosoittolista)	7
France (SNEP)	16
Germany (GfK)	2
Greece (IFPI)	4
Ireland (IRMA)	2
Italy (FIMI)	1
Latvia (Latvijas Top 30)	1
Netherlands (Dutch Top 40)	9
Netherlands (Single Top 100)	5
New Zealand (Recorded Music NZ)	1
Norway (VG-lista)	9
Poland (PiF PaF)	1
Portugal (AFP)	1
Romania (Romanian Top 100)	9
Scottish Singles Sales (Official Charts)	1
Spain (Promusicae)	2
Spain Airplay (Top 40 Radio)	7
Sweden (Sverigetopplistan)	17
Switzerland (Schweizer Hitparade)	3
UK Singles (Official Charts)	1
UK Airplay (Music Week)	1

==== Year-end charts ====
Chart (2001)	Position
Ireland (IRMA)	50
Latvia (Latvijas Top 50)	54
UK Singles (OCC)	30

Chart (2002)	Position
Australia (ARIA)	58
Austria (Ö3 Austria Top 40)	5
Belgium (Ultratop 50 Flanders)	71
Belgium (Ultratop 50 Wallonia)	79
Europe (Eurochart Hot 100)	8
Europe (European Hit Radio)	24
France (SNEP)	93
Germany (Media Control)	20
Ireland (IRMA)	98
Italy (FIMI)	17
Latvia (Latvijas Top 50)	25
Netherlands (Dutch Top 40)	76
Netherlands (Single Top 100)	42
Switzerland (Schweizer Hitparade)	14
Taiwan (Hito Radio)	56
UK Singles (OCC)	147

=== Certifications ===
Region	Certification	Certified units/sales
Australia (ARIA)	Gold	35,000^{^}
Austria (IFPI Austria)	Gold	20,000^{*}
Belgium (BRMA)	Gold	25,000^{*}
France (SNEP)	Gold	250,000^{*}
Germany (BVMI)	Gold	250,000^{^}
New Zealand (RMNZ)	Gold	15,000^{‡}
Spain (Promusicae)	Gold	30,000^{‡}
Switzerland (IFPI Switzerland)	Gold	20,000^{^}
United Kingdom (BPI)	Platinum	600,000^{‡}
^{*} Sales figures based on certification alone.^{^} Shipments figures based on certification alone.^{‡} Sales+streaming figures based on certification alone.

=== Release history ===
Region	Date	Format(s)	Label(s)	Ref.
United Kingdom	December 10, 2001	CD; cassette; DVD	Chrysalis	
Australia	January 28, 2002	CD	Chrysalis	

== Usage in popular culture ==
In episode 21 of the third season of The Simpsons, Sideshow Bob and Selma Bouvier (voiced by Kelsey Grammer and Julie Kavner, respectively) perform the Frank and Nancy Sinatra version as a karaoke.

"Something Stupid", the seventh episode of the fourth season of Better Call Saul, is named after the song, and opens with a split screen montage showing the separate but connected lives of Kim on the left and Jimmy on the right, scored by an original rendition performed by Lola Marsh, which correspondingly has a female voice panned to the left and a male to the right. A hummed, lyricless rendition is later also used in the opening of season five, episode nine, "Bad Choice Road", over another split screen montage, this time of Jimmy and Mike walking stranded through the desert on one side, and Kim fretting at home on the other — only to be abruptly cut off when Jimmy regains cellular signal.

In the film Joy, in a flashback scene, Jennifer Lawrence's title character sings the duet with her soon-to-be husband played by Édgar Ramírez.

The song is featured in the novel ROOM FOR ME by Roger Harvey (UK, 2019).
