= 'Twixt Twelve and Twenty =

Single by Pat Boone

from the album Pat Boone's Golden Hits Featuring Speedy Gonzales
- B-side: "Rock Boll Weevil"
- Released: June 1959
- Recorded: 1959
- Genre: Rock and roll
- Length: 2:18
- Label: Dot
- Songwriter(s): Aaron Schroeder, Fredda Gold

Pat Boone singles chronology
"For a Penny" / "The Wang Dang Taffy-Apple Tango" (1959)	"'Twixt Twelve and Twenty" / "(Welcome) New Lovers" (1959)	"Fools Hall of Fame" (1959)

"'Twixt Twelve and Twenty" is a song by Pat Boone that reached number 17 on the Billboard Hot 100 in 1959.

== Track listing ==
7" single (Dot 45-15955, 1959)
No.	Title	Length
1.	"'Twixt Twelve And Twenty"	2:18
2.	"Rock Boll Weevil"	2:27

== Charts ==
Chart (1959)	Peak position
UK Singles (OCC)	18
US Billboard Hot 100	17
