= Johnny Will =

Single by Pat Boone

from the album Pat Boone's Golden Hits Featuring Speedy Gonzales
- B-side: "(If I'm Dreaming) Just Let Me Dream"
- Released: 1961
- Recorded: 1961
- Genre: Easy listening
- Length: 2:25
- Label: Dot
- Songwriter(s): Fred Tobias; Paul Evans
- Producer(s): Randy Wood

Pat Boone singles chronology
"Big Cold Wind" (1961)	"Johnny Will" / "(Welcome) New Lovers" (1961)	"Just Let Me Dream" (1961)

"Johnny Will" is a song by Pat Boone that reached number 35 on the Billboard Hot 100 in January 1962.

== Track listing ==
7" single (Dot 45-16284, 1961)
No.	Title	Writer(s)	Length
1.	"Johnny Will"	F. Tobias; P. Evans	2:25
2.	"(If I'm Dreaming) Just Let Me Dream"	C. Singleton	2:17

== Charts ==
Chart (1961–1962)	Peak position
Germany (GfK)	2
Norway (VG-lista)	9
UK Singles (OCC)	4
US Billboard Hot 100	35
US Adult Contemporary (Billboard)	10
