= The Wang Dang Taffy-Apple Tango =

Single by Pat Boone

from the album Pat Boone's Golden Hits Featuring Speedy Gonzales
- A-side: "For a Penny"
- Released: 1959
- Recorded: 1959
- Genre: Pop
- Length: 2:16
- Label: Dot
- Songwriter(s): J. Leslie McFarland; Aaron Schroeder

Pat Boone singles chronology
"With the Wind and the Rain in Your Hair" / "Good Rockin' Tonight" (1959)	"The Wang Dang Taffy-Apple Tango" / "For a Penny" (1959)	"'Twixt Twelve and Twenty" (1959)

"The Wang Dang Taffy-Apple Tango" was a pop song, written by J. Leslie McFarland and Aaron Schroeder, and sung by Pat Boone. It was released in 1959 as a B-side, on the single "For a Penny". In 1959, it reached No. 63 on the Billboard Hot 100.

== Track listing ==
7" single (Dot 45-15914, 1959)
No.	Title	Writer(s)	Length
1.	"For a Penny"	Charles Singleton	2:16
2.	"The Wang Dang Taffy-Apple Tango (Mambo Cha Cha Cha)"	Aaron Schroeder; J. Leslie McFarland	2:20
