= For a Penny =

Single by Pat Boone

from the album Pat Boone's Golden Hits Featuring Speedy Gonzales
- A-side: "The Wang Dang Taffy-Apple Tango (Mambo Cha Cha Cha)"
- Released: 1959
- Recorded: 1959
- Genre: Pop
- Length: 2:16
- Label: Dot
- Songwriter: Charles Singleton

Pat Boone singles chronology
"With the Wind and the Rain in Your Hair" / "Good Rockin' Tonight" (1959)	"For a Penny" / "The Wang Dang Taffy-Apple Tango" (1959)	"'Twixt Twelve and Twenty" (1959)

"For a Penny" is a song by Pat Boone that reached number 23 on the Billboard Hot 100 in 1959.

== Track listing ==
7" single (Dot 45-15914, 1959)
No.	Title	Writer(s)	Length
1.	"For a Penny"	Charles Singleton	2:16
2.	"The Wang Dang Taffy-Apple Tango (Mambo Cha Cha Cha)"	Aaron Schroeder; J. Leslie McFarland	2:20

== Charts ==
Chart (1959)	Peak position
UK Singles (Official Charts)	19
US Billboard Hot 100	23
