= Pat Boone's Golden Hits Featuring Speedy Gonzales =

Compilation album by Pat Boone
- Released: 1962
- Genre: Pop
- Label: Dot

Pat Boone compilation album chronology
Pat's Great Hits, Vol. 2 (1960)	Pat Boone's Golden Hits Featuring Speedy Gonzales (1962)	The Gold Collection (1964)

Singles from Pat Boone's Golden Hits Featuring Speedy Gonzales
- 1. "With the Wind and the Rain in Your Hair" Released: January 1959; 2. "For a Penny" / "The Wang Dang Taffy-Apple Tango" Released: February 25, 1959; 3. "'Twixt Twelve and Twenty" Released: June 20, 1959; 4. "(Welcome) New Lovers" / "Words" Released: January 1960; 5. "Dear John" / "Alabam" Released: October 1960; 6. "Big Cold Wind" Released: June 28, 1961; 7. "Johnny Will" Released: October 23, 1961; 8. "Speedy Gonzales" Released: May 19, 1962

Professional ratings
Review scores
Source	Rating
AllMusic	2/5 stars
Billboard	positive ("Spotlight" pick)

Pat Boone's Golden Hits Featuring Speedy Gonzales is a compilation album by Pat Boone, released in 1962 on Dot Records.

== Chart performance ==
The album peaked at No. 66 on the Billboard 150 Best Selling Monoraul LP's chart, during a thirteen-week run on it.

== Track listing ==
Side one
No.	Title	Length
1.	"Speedy Gonzales"
2.	"Johnny Will"
3.	"Words"
4.	"The Wang Dang Taffy-Apple Tango"
5.	"With the Wind and the Rain in Your Hair"
6.	"Dear John"

Side two
No.	Title	Length
1.	"(Welcome) New Lovers"
2.	"For a Penny"
3.	"Big Cold Wind"
4.	"'Twixt Twelve and Twenty"
5.	"Alabam"
6.	"Walking the Floor Over You"

== Charts ==
Chart (1962)	Peak position
US Billboard 150 Best Selling Monoraul LP's	66
