= The Pioneers (band) =

Jamaican reggae vocal group

- Image of the Pioneers with (from left to right), Winston Hewitt, Sydney Crooks and Derrick Crooks

Background information
- Origin: Jamaica
- Genres: Reggae, soul, rocksteady
- Years active: 1962–present
- Labels: Trojan, various others
- Members: Sydney Crooks; George Agard aka George Dekker; Jackie Robinson
- Past members: Winston Hewitt; Derrick Crooks; Glen Adams
- Website: Official website

The Pioneers are a Jamaican reggae, soul and rocksteady vocal trio, whose main period of success was in the 1960s. The trio has had different line-ups, and still occasionally performs.

== Career ==
=== Founding and early years: 1962-67 ===
The Pioneers were formed in 1962 by brothers Sydney and Derrick Crooks, and their friend Winston Hewitt. Their early recordings "Good Nanny" and "I'll Never Come Running Back to You" were self-produced at the Treasure Isle studio in Kingston, Jamaica, using money lent to the Crooks brothers by their mother and appeared on Ken Lack's Caltone label.

Several other singles followed, none of them hits, before Hewitt emigrated to Canada in 1966. Hewitt was replaced for around a year by the former Heptones Glen Adams.

The Pioneers' early singles were not successful, and Sydney began promoting concerts, while Derrick took up a job with the Alcoa bauxite company. The group broke up in mid-1967.

=== Revival: 1967-68 ===
Sydney began working at Joe Gibbs' record shop, and through Gibbs, returned to recording. At his first session (to record "Give Me Little Loving"), with the other members of The Pioneers gone, Crooks recruited Jackie Robinson, who he found outside the studio just before recording began. Crooks later said of the encounter:

"When I was about to voice the song I looked outside the studio and I saw a little boy sitting on a stone. I said 'Hey, come here man, you can sing?' He sang the harmony for 'Give Me Little Loving' and his name was Jackie Robinson. After that I said to him 'You are one of the Pioneers from today' and he became the lead singer of the Pioneers".

The new version of The Pioneers enjoyed success with singles such as "Longshot" (a track written and produced by Lee "Scratch" Perry on Gibbs' behalf about a long-lived but unsuccessful racehorse), "Jackpot", "Catch the Beat", and "Pan Yu Machete" (an attack on Perry, who left Gibbs in 1968 to start working on his own productions). Crooks and Robinson also recorded as The Soul Mates in 1967. The group parted ways with Gibbs after an argument and moved on to work with Leslie Kong, the first recording for Kong being "Samfie Man", a song about a confidence trickster, which topped the Jamaican singles chart.

=== The classic trio, and the move to the UK: 1969-77 ===
After a few further singles with Kong, the group recruited Desmond Dekker's half-brother George Agard to become a trio again. Sydney Crooks and his former Pioneer brother Derrick, along with Winston Bailey also recorded as The Slickers, recording "Nana" for producer Neremiah Reid. The Pioneers scored again with a sequel to "Long Shot", "Long Shot (Kick De Bucket)". When Kong heard that the horse had died (during its 203rd race), he insisted that the group write a song about it; The song was written and recorded quickly and became an instant hit.

The band was popular in the United Kingdom, particularly among skinheads. "Long Shot Kick de Bucket" was a big hit in 1969, and led to a tour of the UK, during which they resolved to relocate there. Their cover of Jimmy Cliff's "Let Your Yeah Be Yeah" made No. 5 in the UK Singles Chart in 1971.

The band moved to the UK in 1970. Their third UK hit was "Give and Take", which reached No. 35 in January 1972.

=== Soul years: 1976-79 ===
In 1976, the Pioneers teamed up with Eddy Grant for an album for Mercury Records called Feel The Rhythm, which featured a nude female model on its cover. Grant preferred to produce them as a soul group and they released a number of singles in that idiom, including "Broken Man", "Feel The Rhythm" and "My Good Friend James"

The change of style was a critical but not a commercial success and the band split up for a time in the late 1970s, with Crooks concentrating on production work and continuing with his brother in The Slickers, while Agard and Robinson continued to record, together on the album George & Jackie Sing, and separately.

=== First reformation: 1979-89 ===
The group reformed in the late 1970s and continued until 1989, when they split again to concentrate on separate careers. "Long Shot Kick de Bucket" was covered by The Specials on their The Special AKA Live! EP, which was a UK No. 1 hit in 1980 and resulted in The Pioneers' original version being reissued (as a double A side with "The Liquidator" by Harry J Allstars) and reaching No. 42 in the UK Singles Chart.

The Pioneers song "Starvation" was also covered on the "Starvation/Tam Tam Pour L'Ethiopie" charity single released in 1985, which peaked at UK number 33. The Pioneers shared lead vocal duties on the single with members of UB40, with backing vocals by General Public.

=== Second reformation: 1999-present ===
In 1999, the group reformed again and have continued to perform together since.

In 2005, the Pioneers performed at the Maranhão Roots Reggae Festival in São Luís, Brazil before 15,000 fans. The following year they appeared at the Godiva Festival in the War Memorial Park, Coventry, England. "Long Shot Kick de Bucket" was used in the 2008 film, The Wackness.

In 2023, Jackie Robinson and George Dekker performed twice as the Pioneers at the London International Ska Festival.

== Discography ==
=== Albums ===
- Greetings from the Pioneers - 1968 - Amalgamated Records - produced by Joe Gibbs
- Long Shot - 1969 - Trojan Records - produced by Leslie Kong
- Battle of the Giants - 1970 - Trojan Records - produced by Leslie Kong
- Yeah! - 1971 - Trojan Records
- I Believe in Love - 1972 - Trojan Records
- Freedom Feeling - 1973 - Trojan Records
- I'm Gonna Knock on Your Door - 1974 - Trojan Records
- Feel the Rhythm - 1976 - Mercury Records
- Roll On Muddy River - 1977 - Trojan Records
- Pusher Man - 1978 - Squad Disco
- Pusher Man - 1978 - Trojan Records (different tracks to the Squad Disco release)
- Baby I Love You - 1979 - Taretone
- What a Feeling - 1980 - Pioneer International
- Reggae for Lovers - 1982 - Vista Sounds
- Reggae for Lovers Vol. 2 - 1983 - Vista Sounds
- More Reggae for Lovers Vol. 3 - 1985 - Vista Sounds
- More Reggae for Lovers Vol. 4 - 1985 - Vista Sounds

Compilations

- From the Beginning 1969–1976 - Pioneer International
- Kick de Bucket - Rhino Records
- Greatest Hits - 1979 - Trojan Records
- ...Best of – Longshot Kick de Bucket - 1997 - Trojan Records
- Let Your Yeah Be Yeah: Anthology 1966 to 1986 - 2001 - Trojan Records
- Give and Take: The Best of The Pioneers - 2002 - Trojan Records

=== Singles ===
- "Golden Opportunity" (1965), Wincox
- "River Bed" (1965), Wincox
- "Sometime" (1965), Island (B-side to Theo Beckford's "Trench Town People")
- "Good Nannie" (1966), Rio
- "Too Late" (1966), Rio
- "Teardrops to a Smile" (1967), Caltone (B-side to The Emotions' "A Rainbow")
- "Goodies Are the Greatest" (1967), Amalgamated
- "Long Shot (Bus Me Bet)" (1967), Amalgamated
- "Never Come Running Back" (1967), Rio (with The Ramblers)
- "Give Me Little Loving" (1968), Amalgamated
- "Catch the Beat" (1968), Amalgamated (with Gibson's All Star)
- "Don't You Know" (1968), Amalgamated
- "Easy Come Easy Go" (1968), Pyramid (with Beverley's All Stars)
- "Long Shot" (1968), Amalgamated
- "No Dope Me Pony" (1968), Amalgamated
- "Sweet Dreams" (1968), Amalgamated
- "Whip Them" (1968), Blue Cat
- "Jackpot" (1968), Amalgamated
- "I Love No Other Girl" (1968), Caltone (with The Ramblers)
- "Give It to Me" (1968), Blue Cat
- "Regga Beat" (1968), Blue Cat
- "Tickle Me for Days" (1968), Amalgamated
- "Shake It Up" (1968), Blue Cat
- "Poor Rameses" (1969), Trojan
- "Samfie Man" (1969), Trojan
- "Long Shot Kick the Bucket" (1969), Trojan (UK No. 21)
- "Who the Cap Fits" (1969), Amalgamated
- "Mama Look Deh" (1969), Amalgamated
- "Black Bud" (1969), Trojan
- "Alli Button" (1969), Amalgamated
- "Boss Festival" (1969)
- "Love Love Everyday" (1969), Amalgamated (B-side to Moon Boys' "Apollo 11")
- "Pee Pee Cluck Cluck" (1969), Pyramid
- "In Orbit" (1969), Beverly's
- "Money Day" (1970), Trojan
- "I Need Your Sweet Inspiration" (1970), Trojan
- "Simmer Down Quashie" (1970), Trojan
- "Driven Back" (1970), Trojan
- "Battle of the Giants" (1970), Trojan
- "Starvation" (1970), Summit
- "Let Your Yeah Be Yeah" (1971), Trojan (UK No. 5)
- "Give and Take" (1971), Trojan (UK No. 35)
- "Get Ready" (1971), Summit
- "Land of Complexion" (1971), Summit
- "I Am a Believer" (1971), Hot Shot
- "Roll Muddy River" (1972), Trojan
- "I Believe in Love" (1972), Trojan
- "You Don't Know Like I Know" (1972), Trojan
- "The World Needs Love" (1972), Trojan
- "Mother and Child Reunion" (1972), Trojan (with Greyhound)
- "Story Book Children" (1972), Summit
- "A Little Bit of Soap" (1973), Trojan
- "At the Discotheque" (1973), Trojan
- "Bad to Be Good" (1973), Trojan
- "Papa Was a Rolling Stone" (1973), Joe Gibbs
- "Some Livin' Some Dyin'" (197?), Trojan
- "Honey Bee" (1974), Trojan
- "Jamaica Jerk Off" (1974), Trojan
- "Sweet Number One" (1974), Trojan
- "I'm Gonna Knock on Your Door" (1974), Trojan
- "Do What You Wanna Do" (1975), Fontana
- "Feel the Rhythm (of You and I)" (1976), Mercury
- "Broken Man" (1976), Mercury
- "My Good Friend James" (1977), Mercury
- "My Special Prayer" (1977), Trojan
- "Mother Ritty" (19??), Beverley's
- "Riot in a Notting Hill" (1978), Trojan
- "Your Love Is Something Else" (1979), ICE
- "Rock My Soul" (1985), Creole
- "Reggae in London City" (1986), Trojan
- "Do It Right" (1986), Trojan
- "Bad Company" (198?), Pioneer International
- "Starvation" (198?), Boss
- "Bring Back the Yester Years" (1997), Joe Gibbs
- "Run Run Run" (19??), MGA
- "Mettle" (19??), Trojan
- "Nosey Parker" (19??), Pioneer
- "Pan Yu Machete" (19??)

The Pioneers also had a number 42 UK hit in 1980 with a double-A-side release of "Long Shot Kick de Bucket" and Harry J All-Stars' "Liquidator", and a four-track EP consisting of tracks by The Pioneers, The Maytals, The Skatalites, and Jimmy Cliff reached number 86 in 1989.

== Cover versions ==
The Pioneers track "Jackpot" was covered by The Beat on their 1980 album I Just Can't Stop It. Their song "Starvation" was also covered on the "Starvation/Tam Tam Pour L'Ethiopie" charity single released in 1985.

- The Selecter covered "Time Hard" as "Everyday" on their 1980 album Too Much Pressure.

== See also ==
- List of reggae musicians
- List of ska musicians
- Trojan skinhead
- Island Records discography
