= Words (Pat Boone song) =

Single by Pat Boone

from the album Pat Boone's Golden Hits Featuring Speedy Gonzales
- A-side: "(Welcome) New Lovers"
- Released: January 1960
- Length: 2:44
- Label: Dot
- Songwriter(s): James Cavanaugh, C. Notelgnis

Pat Boone singles chronology
"Beyond the Sunset" (1959)	"Words" / "(Welcome) New Lovers" (1960)	"Walking the Floor over You" / "Spring Rain" (1960)

Audio
- "Words" on YouTube

"Words" is a song by Pat Boone that reached number 94 on the Billboard Hot 100 in 1960.

== Background ==
It is a new-lyrics version of the song "Silver Threads Among the Gold".

== Track listing ==
7" single (Dot 45-16048, 1960)
No.	Title	Length
1.	"(Welcome) New Lovers"	2:25
2.	"Words"	2:44

== Charts ==
Chart (1960)	Peak position
US Billboard Hot 100	94
