= Evil Man's Blues =

1941 jazz song composed by Leonard Feather

Song by Hot Lips Page Trio
- B-side: "Do It, If You Wanna"
- Released: February 21, 1941
- Recorded: December 10, 1940
- Genre: Jazz, blues
- Label: Bluebird Records
- Songwriter(s): Leonard Feather

"Evil Man's Blues", alternately titled "Evil Man Blues" or "Evil Gal Blues", is a jazz song composed by Leonard Feather and first released in 1941 by the Hot Lips Page Trio. The song's lyrics are delivered from the perspective of an "evil" man or gal warning a prospective lover against pursuing them romantically.

== Release ==
The Hot Lips Page Trio recorded "Evil Man's Blues" in December 1940. It was released on February 21, 2021, by Bluebird Records with "Do It, If You Wanna" as a B-side.

== Notable versions ==
=== Dinah Washington ===
"Evil Gal Blues"

Song by Dinah Washington, Lionel Hampton Sextet
- Released: 1944
- Recorded: December 29, 1943
- Label: Keynote Records
- Songwriter(s): Leonard Feather

In 1944, Dinah Washington launched her career accompanying the Lionel Hampton Sextet on a two-disc set of 10-inch 78 rpm records. "Evil Gal Blues" was the B-side of the first disk. Peaking at number 9 on the Harlem Hit Parade, now known as the Billboard Hot R&B/Hip Hop chart, the Great American Songbook Foundation described the record as Washington's "first big hit".

In 2010, BBC Four premiered a documentary about Washington's life titled Evil Gal Blues.

Chart history
Chart	Peak position
US Billboard R&B	9

=== Other versions ===
Aretha Franklin covered Washington's version on Unforgettable: A Tribute to Dinah Washington in 1964. The recording later appeared on the 1985 compilation album Aretha Sings the Blues.

A version of the song titled "Evil Man Blues" and credited to The Candy Shop Boys appeared on the soundtrack to the 2014 action film John Wick.
