= Clara Edwards =

American singer, pianist, and composer

Clara Edwards (April 17, 1880 – January 17, 1974) was an American singer, pianist, and composer of art songs. She also used the pseudonym Bernard Haigh.

== Biography ==
She was born Clara Gerlich in Decoria Township, Blue Earth County, Minnesota. She received her education from the Mankato State Normal School and the Cosmopolitan School of Music in Chicago. She married physician John Milton Edwards before finishing her degree, and the couple moved to Vienna, where she continued musical studies and had a daughter. In Europe she prepared for a career as a singer, and gave concerts in both the United States and Europe before moving to New York City in 1914. Two years later her husband died, leaving her a single mother in New York city with no steady income.

Out of financial necessity, Edwards began her career as a composer and songwriter in the 1920s, joining the American Society of Composers, Authors and Publishers (ASCAP) in 1925. She toured in Vaudeville at about the same time, and organized the Chautauqua Concert Company in 1934. She often collaborated with Jack Lawrence, but also wrote many of the lyrics to her own songs.

== Music ==
Edwards composed over 100 works and published over 60 songs. Several of her songs are sacred, and she wrote choral arrangements for some of them. She also composed music for solo piano, for children's marionette plays and animated films. Her songs have been recorded and issued on CD and used in film soundtracks and animations.

Her songs were "quickly taken up by publishers", and many famous singers performed them, including soprano Lily Pons and baritones John Charles Thomas and Ezio Pinza. They also became more successful when performed on the popular radio show The Bell Telephone Hour. They are "distinguished for their tasteful and truly lovely melodies" and considered some of the "best of the ballad style concert song[s]". They "successfully blended the styles of art song and the sentimental popular ballad".

Perhaps her most successful song was "With the Wind and the Rain in Your Hair", with text by Jack Lawrence. First published in 1930, it became a hit a decade later. Two of her other well-known songs are "By the Bend of the River" and "Into the Night"; the latter is frequently used by voice teachers as a training piece, and is included in several song anthologies. She died in New York City.

== Published songs ==
published by G. Schirmer unless noted

- After (A Song of Contrasts), 1927
- All Thine Own, Carl Fischer, 1935
- At Twilight, 1944
- At Your Window, 1951
- Awake! Arise! (a Song for Easter), Oliver Ditson, 1927
- Awake, Beloved!, 1925
- A Benediction, 1927
- Birds (text by Moira O'Neill), 1958
- Bring Back the Days, Oliver Ditson, 1945
- By the Bend of the River, 1927
- Can this be Summer? (A Song of Longing), 1926
- Clementine, 1927
- Come, Love, the Long Day Closes (A Song of Devotion), 1928
- Cradle Song
- The Day's Begun, 1930
- Dedication (Sacred Song), 1961
- Dusk at Sea (text by Thomas S. Jones), Jack Mills Inc., 1923
- The Eastern Heavens are all aglow (Christmas Song), 1927
- Evening Song, 1934
- Every One Sang (A song of exultation) (text by S. Sassoon), 1921
- Fear Ye Not, O Israel (Sacred Song), 1942
- The Fisher's Widow (text by Arthur Symons), 1929
- Forward We March, Galaxy Music Corp., 1940
- Gipsy Life, 1932
- I Bring you lilies from my Garden, Oliver Ditson, 1927
- I Dream of You, 1952
- In the Moonlight, 1951
- Into the Night (text by the composer), 1939
- I've Lived and Loved, Galaxy Music Corporation, 1941
- Joy (text by T. Hollingsworth), 1943
- Lady Moon (text by Thekla Hollingsworth), Oliver Ditson, 1927
- Little Shepherd's Song (13th Century melody) (text by William Alexander Percy), Jack Mills Inc., 1952
- Lonesome (text by N. R. Eberhart), 1926
- The Lord is Exalted (Sacred), 1940
- Love Came to Me
- A Love Song, Oliver Ditson, 1945
- Morning Serenade (A Reveille) (text by Madison Julius Cawein), 1928
- My Homeland, 1934
- My Little Brown Nest by the Sea (text by T. Hollingsworth), Jack Mills Inc., 1923
- My Shrine (Wedding Song), 1948
- O Come to Me
- O Magic Night of Love, 1927
- Ol' Jim, 1952
- Out of the Dusk (A Reverie), 1927
- A Prayer (Sacred), 1932
- The Snow, 1962
- Sometimes at Close of Day (A Pensive Song), 1925
- Song of my Soul
- Song of the Brooklet (text by V. McDonald), 1932
- Spain (España), 1929
- Stars of the Night, Sing Softly (text by T. Hollingsworth), 1929
- 'Tis Enough (text by Kenneth Rand), Jack Mills Inc., 1923
- To a Little Child, 1954
- To Stars and You
- To Thee, Divine Reedemer, 1948
- The Twenty-Seventh Psalm (The Lord is My Light), 1938
- We Walked in the Garden, 1939
- When I am Gone, Beloved
- When I Behold, 1929
- When Jesus Walked on Galilee (Sacred), 1928
- When the Sun Calls the Lark, Oliver Ditson, 1929
- When You Stand by your Window, 1944
- The Wild Rose Blooms, 1940
- With the Wind and the Rain in Your Hair (text by Jack Lawrence), 1930, reissued Paramount Music Corp., 1940
- A Yesterday
- Your Picture, Chappell Music, 1952

== Published piano solos ==
published by G. Schirmer unless noted

- By the Bend of the River (Barcarolle), arr. by Carl Deis
- Cloud Ways
- Nodding Flowers
- The Rocking Chair
- The Swing
- The Waves

== Published choral arrangements ==
published by G. Schirmer unless noted

- Awake! Arise! (Easter Anthem) (arr. by William Stickles), mixed voices, 1958
- By the Bend of the River, multiple arrangements
- Clementine, women's voices
- Come, Love, the Long Day Closes, men's voices
- Dedication (text by John Oxenham), mixed voices, 1960
- The Eastern Heaves are all Aglow (arr. by William Stickles), mixed voices, 1962
- The Herder's Song, women's voices, 1946
- Into the Night, multiple arrangements
- I Will Lift Mine Eyes, mixed voices
- The Lord is My Light, mixed voices, 1940
- A Prayer, mixed voiced
- Sometimes at Close of Day, men's voices
- A Song of Joy, women's voices
- Song of the Brooklet, women's voices
- The Twenty-Seventh Psalm, mixed voices
- When I Behold, mixed voices
- When Jesus Walked on Galilee (arr. Carl Deis), mixed voices, 1951
