= Fools Hall of Fame =

Single by Pat Boone
- B-side: "Brightest Wishing Star"
- Released: 1959
- Recorded: 1959
- Length: 2:43
- Label: Dot
- Songwriter(s): Aaron Schroeder, Wally Gold

Pat Boone singles chronology
"'Twixt Twelve and Twenty" (1959)	"Fools Hall of Fame" (1959)	"Beyond the Sunset" (1959)

"Fools Hall of Fame" is a song by Pat Boone that reached number 29 on the Billboard Hot 100 in 1959.

== Track listing ==
7" single (Dot 45-15982, 1959)
No.	Title	Length
1.	"Fools Hall of Fame"	2:43
2.	"Brightest Wishing Star"	2:01

== Charts ==
Chart (1959)	Peak position
US Billboard Hot 100	29
