= Moody River =

- Moody River by Pat Boone

Single by Pat Boone

from the album Moody River
- B-side: "A Thousand Years"
- Released: May 1961
- Recorded: April 8, 1961
- Studio: Radio Recorders, Hollywood, California, U.S.
- Genre: Countrypolitan
- Length: 2:41
- Label: Dot
- Songwriter(s): Gary D. Bruce
- Producer(s): Randy Wood

Pat Boone singles chronology
"The Exodus Song (This Land Is Mine)" (1960)	"Moody River" (1961)	"Big Cold Wind" (1961)

"Moody River" is a song written by and originally performed by country music and rockabilly singer Chase Webster (real name Gary Daniel Bruce, not to be confused with Gary Bruce, the drummer of The Knack).

Pat Boone recorded and released his own version in May 1961, where it reached number-one on the Billboard Hot 100 chart the following month. This was the title track from one of Boone's better-selling albums. Boone sang this song as if he were in pain.

== Plot ==
The 'story-song' tells the tale of a man who plans to meet his love on the riverbank, by an old oak tree, but finds her glove and a note for him, indicating she has committed suicide via drowning, "river more deadly, than the vainest knife". The note explains that she had cheated on him and cannot lie about it, "No longer can I live with this hurt and this sin. I just couldn't tell you 'that guy was just a friend'."

He then notices his own reflection in the river, "lonely, lonely face just lookin' back at me", and begins to weep "Tears in his eyes, and a prayer on his lips, and the glove of his lost love, at his fingertips".

== "Vainest knife" lyric ==
Gary Bruce's original lyrics were "more deadly than the sharpest knife", but during the recording session the P in "sharpest" kept popping. Rather than find a different mic or a filter, Chase changed "sharpest" to "vainest" on the spot, with no thought given to the meaning.

When Pat Boone recorded it a couple of months later, Dot Records chief exec, Randy Wood, verified the lyric before Boone's release.

== Chart performance ==
Chart (1961)	Peak position
Canada (CHUM Hit Parade)	1
New Zealand (Lever Hit Parade)	1
U.K. Singles charts	18
U.S. Billboard Hot 100	1
U.S. Adult Contemporany	4

== See also ==
- List of Hot 100 number-one singles of 1961 (U.S.)
