= The Electrifying Aretha Franklin =

1962 studio album by Aretha Franklin

Studio album by Aretha Franklin
- Released: March 19, 1962
- Recorded: July 11, 1961 – January 25, 1962
- Studio: Columbia Recording Studios, (New York City)
- Genre: Jazz, traditional pop
- Length: 31:30
- Label: Columbia
- Producer: John H. Hammond, Richard Wess

Aretha Franklin chronology
Aretha (1961)	The Electrifying Aretha Franklin (1962)	The Tender, the Moving, the Swinging Aretha Franklin (1962)

Singles from The Electrifying Aretha Franklin
- 1. "Rock-a-Bye Your Baby with a Dixie Melody" Released: September 1, 1961

Professional ratings
Review scores
Source	Rating
AllMusic	3/5 stars

The Electrifying Aretha Franklin is the second studio album by American singer Aretha Franklin, released on March 19, 1962 by Columbia Records. The album, which is also known under its working title The Incomparable Aretha Franklin, was recorded at Columbia Recording Studios, 799 Seventh Avenue, New York. It was produced by John Hammond and arranged by Richard Wess.

== Track listing ==
=== Side one ===
1. "You Made Me Love You" (Joe McCarthy, James Vincent Monaco) 2:19
2. "I Told You So" (John Leslie McFarland) 2:44
3. "Rock-a-Bye Your Baby With a Dixie Melody" (Sam M. Lewis, Jean Schwartz, Joe Young) 2:24
4. "Nobody Like You" (James Cleveland) 2:23
5. "Exactly Like You" (Jimmy McHugh, Dorothy Fields) 2:36
6. "It's So Heartbreakin'" (John Leslie McFarland) 2:39

=== Side two ===
1. "Rough Lover" (John Leslie McFarland) 2:48
2. "Blue Holiday" (Willie Denson, Luther Dixon) 2:53
3. "Just for You" (Joe Bailey, John Leslie McFarland) 2:20
4. "That Lucky Old Sun (Just Rolls Around Heaven All Day)" (Haven Gillespie, Harry Beasley Smith) 3:20
5. "I Surrender, Dear" (Harry Barris, Gordon Clifford) 2:46
6. "Ac-Cent-Tchu-Ate the Positive" (Harold Arlen, Johnny Mercer) 2:18

=== Bonus tracks on reissues ===
1. "Introduction To Hard Times" 0:31
2. "Hard Times (No One Knows Better Than I)" 3:08
3. "When They Ask About You" 2:59
4. "Operation Heartbreak" 2:59

=== Mono mixes ===
1. "I Surrender, Dear" 2:46
2. "Rough Lover" 2:47
3. "Kissin' By The Mistletoe" (Also appears on An All-Star Christmas, CL 1699) 2:22

== Personnel ==
- Aretha Franklin – vocals, piano
- John H. Hammond – producer, personal supervisor
