= The Tender, the Moving, the Swinging Aretha Franklin =

1962 studio album by Aretha Franklin

Studio album by Aretha Franklin
- Released: August 13, 1962
- Recorded: April 27; May 4–5; May 11, 1962
- Studio: Columbia Recording Studio, (New York City, New York)
- Genre: Jazz; soul; traditional pop
- Length: 35:21
- Label: Columbia
- Producer: Robert Mersey

Aretha Franklin chronology
The Electrifying Aretha Franklin (1961)	The Tender, the Moving, the Swinging Aretha Franklin (1962)	Laughing on the Outside (1963)

Professional ratings
Review scores
Source	Rating
AllMusic	2/5 stars
The Encyclopedia of Popular Music	2/5 stars
The Rolling Stone Album Guide	2.5/5 stars

The Tender, the Moving, the Swinging Aretha Franklin is the third studio album by American singer Aretha Franklin, released in 1962 by Columbia Records. It was her first album to achieve any commercial success, reaching number 69 on the Billboard pop album charts, spending a total of eight weeks on the chart. Unlike its predecessor, however, it did not have a hit single. The album was recorded at Columbia Recording Studio, in New York City.

== Track listing ==
=== Side One ===
1. "Don't Cry, Baby" (Saul Bernie, James P. Johnson, Stella Unger) – 3:23
2. "Try a Little Tenderness" (James Campbell and Reginald Connelly, Harry M. Woods) – 3:16
3. "I Apologize" (Al Hoffman, Al Goodhart, Ed Nelson) – 2:53
4. "Without the One You Love" (Aretha Franklin) – 2:48
5. "Look for the Silver Lining" (Jerome Kern, B. G. DeSylva) – 3:04
6. "I'm Sitting on Top of the World" (Ray Henderson, Sam M. Lewis, Joe Young) – 2:42

=== Side Two ===
1. "Just for a Thrill" (Lil Hardin Armstrong, Don Raye) 2:33
2. "God Bless the Child" (Billie Holiday, Arthur Herzog, Jr.) – 3:03
3. "I'm Wandering" (Berry Gordy, Jr., Tyran Carlo) – 3:27
4. "How Deep Is the Ocean" (Irving Berlin) – 2:48
5. "I Don't Know You Anymore" (Gary Geld, Peter Udell) – 2:50
6. "Lover Come Back to Me" (Sigmund Romberg, Oscar Hammerstein II) – 2:35

=== Mono Mixes ===
Bonus tracks on reissue

1. "Trouble In Mind" (Richard M. Jones) – 2:15
2. "Without the One You Love" – 2:46
3. "Don't Cry, Baby" – 3:14
4. "I'm Wandering" – 3:25
5. "Try a Little Tenderness" – 3:14
6. "I Apologize" – 2:52
7. "Lover Come Back to Me" – 2:34
8. "I Don't Know You Anymore" – 2:47

== Personnel ==
- Aretha Franklin – vocals, piano
- Robert Mersey – producer, personal supervisor, arrangements, conductor
- Don Hunstein – cover photography

== Charts ==
Year	Chart	Position
1962	Billboard Pop Albums	69
