= Speedy Gonzales (song) =

1961 popular music song

Single by David Dante
- B-side: "K-K-K-Katy"
- Released: April 1961
- Recorded: 1961
- Genre: Pop, Novelty songs
- Length: 2:28
- Label: RCA Victor
- Songwriters: Buddy Kaye, Ethel Lee, David Hill
- Producer: Hugo & Luigi

"Speedy Gonzales" is a 1961 song by David Hess (RCA 8056), who recorded it under the name David Dante, about Speedy Gonzales, "the fastest mouse in all Mexico". It was written by Buddy Kaye, Ethel Lee and Dante/Hess. The David Dante original version briefly entered the U.S. Music Vendor chart in April 1961. It also peaked at number 2 in the Philippines.

== Pat Boone version ==
"Speedy Gonzales"

Single by Pat Boone

from the album Pat Boone's Golden Hits Featuring Speedy Gonzales
- B-side: "The Locket"
- Released: May 19, 1962
- Recorded: 1962
- Genre: Pop
- Length: 2:30
- Label: Dot
- Songwriters: Buddy Kaye, Ethel Lee, David Hill
- Producer: Randy Wood

The song was popularized in the United States as a 1962 single by Pat Boone. The Boone version peaked at the No. 6 Billboard Hot 100 position in 1962 during a total chart run of 13 weeks, doing better in many national charts in Europe, where it sold a million copies. The female voice ("La-la-la...") on this song was of Robin Ward. It also incorporated Mel Blanc voicing Speedy Gonzales as he did in the Warner Brothers cartoons.

Dante's version details a demand from a girl named Consuela to Speedy to stop roving about and take care of his neglected household. Boone's song adds a spoken introduction stating that he was wandering between some old adobe haciendas on a moonlit night in Mexico, where he heard the voice of a Mexican girl calling to Speedy, and Mel Blanc's inserts replace a recurring line from Dante's lyrics.

Warner Bros. Pictures sued Boone and Dot Records for $850,000 over Blanc's performance of Speedy's voice on Boone's record without their authorization. The case was later dropped.

=== Charts ===
Pat Boone version

| Chart (1962) | Peak position |
|---|---|
| Argentina | 1 |
| Australia (Kent Music Report) | 3 |
| Belgium (Ultratop 50 Flanders) | 1 |
| Belgium (Ultratop 50 Wallonia) | 7 |
| France (IFOP) | 8 |
| Ireland (Evening Herald) | 4 |
| Netherlands (Dutch Top 40) | 1 |
| Norway (VG-lista) | 1 |
| Sweden (Kvällstoppen) | 1 |
| Sweden (Tio i Topp) | 1 |
| UK Singles (Official Charts) | 2 |
| US Billboard Hot 100 | 6 |
| West Germany (GfK) | 1 |

== See also ==
- Crocodile Rock (a song by Elton John with a similar chorus)
- Putin khuilo! (a Russian/Ukrainian football chant, as assumed by Artemy Troitsky, inspired by "Speedy Gonzales" chorus)
