= (Welcome) New Lovers =

Single by Pat Boone

from the album Pat Boone's Golden Hits Featuring Speedy Gonzales
- A-side: "Words"
- Released: January 1960
- Recorded: 1959
- Genre: Traditional pop, ballad
- Length: 2:25
- Label: Dot
- Songwriter(s): Charles Singleton
- Producer(s): Randy Wood

Pat Boone singles chronology
"Beyond the Sunset" (1959)	"(Welcome) New Lovers" / "Words" (1960)	"Walking the Floor over You" / "Spring Rain" (1960)

"(Welcome) New Lovers" is a 1960 song written by Charles Singleton and recorded in 1959 by American actor and singer Pat Boone. It reached No. 18 on the Billboard Hot 100.

It is a rockaballad.

== Track listing ==
7" single (Dot 45-16048, 1960)
No.	Title	Length
1.	"(Welcome) New Lovers"	2:25
2.	"Words"	2:44

== Chart performance ==
Chart (1960)	Peak position
U.S. Billboard Hot 100	18
