= Be Honest with Me =

1940 song by Gene Autry and Fred Rose

Single by Gene Autry
- B-side: "What's Gonna Happen to Me"
- Published: October 11, 1940 by Western Music Publishing Co., Hollywood, Calif.
- Released: January 17, 1941
- Recorded: August 20, 1940
- Studio: CBS Columbia Square, Hollywood, California
- Genre: Hillbilly, Western
- Length: 2:45
- Label: Okeh 05980
- Songwriters: Gene Autry, Fred Rose
- Producer: Art Satherly

Gene Autry singles chronology
"You Waited Too Long" (1940)	"Be Honest with Me" (1941)	"You Are My Sunshine / It Makes No Difference Now" (1941)

"Be Honest With Me" was a 1940 song by Gene Autry and Fred Rose. The recording by Autry was one of the big Hillbilly (Country and Western) hits of 1941, and was nominated for the 1942 Academy Award for Best Original Song.

Autry recorded it on August 20, 1940, at CBS Columbia Square Studios, Hollywood, California. At the time, the working title was "Be Honest With Me Dear", and Autry was the sole songwriter. Later in the year, it was decided the song would be included in the singing cowboy's latest film, 'Ridin' on a Rainbow', directed by Lew Landers. One week before the film was released on January 24, 1941, "Be Honest with Me" was released on Columbia Records budget Hillbilly label, Okeh 5980, coupled with "What's Gonna Happen to Me". An error on the disc label lists "Autry" as the sole songwriter. However, sources including publishing info and geneautry.com confirm it was an Autry-Rose collaboration. Error on disc label carried down several years. It reached the top of The Billboard's monthly Hilllbilly chart during the fall of 1941, and finished as the No. 3 song of 1941 to "You Are My Sunshine" and Ernest Tubb's "Walking the Floor Over You". The film received a nomination for the Academy Award for Best Original Song for "Be Honest with Me"

Despite his enormous success, Autry dutifully enlisted in the U.S. Army in 1942. He and Rose wrote their last numbers together when he returned in 1944, including their biggest hit, "At Mail Call Today". 1940-41 was their most prolific time together, and "Be Honest With Me" their biggest hit during that time. It is notable that the song was covered by the major Hillbilly acts of the day (see Cover versions) in 1941, plus Bing Crosby, the number one popular singer.

== Chart performance ==
Charts (1941)	Rank
US Billboard National Best Selling Retail Records	17
"The Billboard Hillbilly Record Hits of the Month" column	1
US Billboard National Best Selling Retail Records Year-End	147
"The Billboard Hillbilly Record Hits" Year-End	3

== Cover versions ==
- Red Foley covered the song in a recording session on March 26, 1941. The single was released by Decca Records (#5936) in April 1941, with "Ridin' on a Rainbow" on the flipside.
- Jimmy Wakely and His Rough Riders recorded the song on April 9, 1941, which was released by Decca Records (#5942) on April 22, 1941, with "Won't You Remember" on the flipside.
- Roy Acuff and His Smoky Mountain Boys recorded the song on April 28, 1941, which was released by Okeh Records (#6229) on June 3, 1941, with "Worried Mind" on the flipside.
- Dick Robertson and His Orchestra recorded the song on May 9, 1941 . The single was released by Decca Records (#3791) in July 1941, with "Goodbye, dear, I'll be back in a year" on the flipside.
- Bing Crosby with John Scott Trotter Eight recorded the song on May 23, 1941 . The single was released by Decca Records (#3856) in June 1941, with "Goodbye, Little Darlin’, Goodbye" on the flipside.
- Freddy Martin and His Orchestra Clyde Rogers; Eddie Stone recorded the song on July 23, 1941, which was released by Victor Records (#6229) on June 3, 1941, with "Is it taboo? (To fall in love with you)" on the flipside.
