= Big Love (Ali Campbell album) =

Studio album by Ali Campbell
- Released: 1995
- Label: Kuff; Virgin

Ali Campbell chronology
Big Love (1995)	Running Free (2007)

Professional ratings
Review scores
Source	Rating
AllMusic	4.5/5 stars
NME	6/10

Big Love is the debut solo album by English singer and songwriter Ali Campbell, lead singer of the band UB40. It was released in 1995 and includes the singles "That Look in Your Eye", which reached number 5 in the UK Singles Chart, "Let Your Yeah Be Yeah", which reached number 25 and "Somethin' Stupid", a duet with Campbell's daughter Kibibi, which reached number 30.

== Track listing ==
No.	Title	Writer(s)	Length
1.	"Big Love (Intro)"	Ali Campbell	2:03
2.	"Happiness"	Syreeta Wright	4:48
3.	"That Look in Your Eye"	Kenny "Boudro" Gray; Pamela Starks	4:04
4.	"Let Your Yeah Be Yeah"	Jimmy Cliff	4:16
5.	"You Can Cry on My Shoulder"	Berry Gordy	3:26
6.	"Somethin' Stupid"	Carson Parks	3:20
7.	"Big Love"	Campbell; Jack Radics	2:42
8.	"You Could Meet Somebody"	UB40	3:12
9.	"Talking Blackbird"	A. Campbell; Kibibi Campbell	4:56
10.	"Pay the Rent"	A. Campbell	3:52
11.	"Drive It Home"	Snooks Eaglin	2:04
12.	"Stop the Guns"	A. Campbell	2:14

== Charts ==
Chart (1995)	Peak position
UK Albums (OCC)	6

== Certifications ==
Region	Certification	Certified units/sales
United Kingdom (BPI)	Gold	100,000^{^}
^{^} Shipments figures based on certification alone.
