= Jackie Robinson (musician) =

- Also known as: Harry Hippy
- Born: Loren Jackson Robinson
- Origin: Jamaica
- Genres: Ska, rocksteady, reggae
- Occupation: Singer-songwriter
- Instrument: Vocals
- Years active: 1967–present
- Member of: The Pioneers

Jackie Robinson is a Jamaican singer, best known as the lead vocalist with The Pioneers, but who has also recorded solo material both under his own name, and under the pseudonym Harry Hippy.

== Biography ==
Jackie Robinson became the lead singer of The Pioneers in 1967. Robinson recorded extensively with The Pioneers for the next twenty years and still performs with the group. He also recorded solo material, including the "Over & Over" single in 1968, and "Heart Made of Stone" in 1970. In the 1970s, his partner in The Pioneers, Sydney Crooks, moved into production, and worked with Dennis Brown while he was in the United Kingdom. The results of this included the album Dennis Brown Meets Harry Hippy, which was split between Brown and Robinson, Robinson taking on this pseudonym after recording a cover version of the Bobby Womack hit of the same name. He went on to work with other UK-based producers, including Clement Bushay ("Don't Leave Me This Way") and Lloyd Charmers ("Jamaican Child"). Robinson also recorded the track "Don't Do the Crime" with UB40 on their 2002 album UB40 Present the Fathers Of Reggae.

== Non-Pioneers discography ==
=== Albums ===
- Dennis Brown Meets Harry Hippy (1977), Pioneer
- Consider Me (19??), Kingston
- George & Jackie Sing (197?), Greenway (George Dekker & Jackie Robinson)
- More Reggae Love Songs Vol. 2 (19??), Sky Note (credited to Jackie Pioneer & Singing Maxine)

=== Singles ===
- "Over & Over" (1968), Punch
- "Heart Made of Stone" (1970), Amalgamated
- "Come On Over to My Place" (1972), Trojan
- "Homely Girl" (1974), Harry J
- "My Love For You", Harry J
- "Warm and Tender Love" (1974), Horse
- "Personality" (1974), Horse
- "In My Life" (1975), Horse
- "Say You" (1975), Horse
- "Sweet Sensation" (1975), Greenway
- "Smile Like An Angel" / Version (1976), Jama
- "Santa Ain't Commin Down to Brixton Town", Reel Grande
- "I'm Sorry About That"/"Don't Leave Me This Way" (1977), Bushays
- "Better Love Next Time"/"Jamaican Child" (1980), Ice (Jackie Robinson featuring The Mexicano)
- "Spit in the Skys"/"French Town Girl" Pioneer (A-side: Delroy Wilson & Jackie Robinson, B-side Eddy Grant & Jackie Robinson)
- "Little Green Apples"
