= The World We Knew =

Studio album by Frank Sinatra
- Released: August 1967
- Recorded: February 1, June 29–30, July 1, 24 and 27, 1967 at United-Western Studios in Hollywood
- Genre: Traditional pop
- Length: 28:09
- Label: Reprise; FS 1022
- Producer: Jimmy Bowen (all tracks); Lee Hazlewood (track 2)

Frank Sinatra chronology
Francis Albert Sinatra & Antônio Carlos Jobim (1967)	The World We Knew (1967)	Francis A. & Edward K. (1968)

The World We Knew, also known as Frank Sinatra, is a 1967 studio album by American singer Frank Sinatra.

The album's title track reached No. 30 on the US Billboard Hot 100 chart and #1 on the Easy Listening chart in 1967. Its second track, "Somethin' Stupid"—a duet between Sinatra and his daughter Nancy—reached No. 1 on both charts.

== Reception ==
Professional ratings
Review scores
Source	Rating
AllMusic	2.5/5 stars
Record Mirror	4/5 stars

Upon release, Billboard reviewed the album favorably, praising its overall quality while noting the cover art as its primary shortcoming.

Music critic Stephen Thomas Erlewine, in his review of the album for AllMusic, awarded it two-and-a-half out of five stars, and described it as, "More of a singles collection than a proper album [...] Much of this has a rock-oriented pop production, complete with fuzz guitars, reverb, folky acoustic guitars, wailing harmonicas, drum kits, organs, and brass and string charts that punctuate the songs rather than provide the driving force [...] the songs Sinatra tackles with a variety of arrangers are more ambitious than most middle-of-the-road, adult-oriented soft rock of the late '60s." Erlewine described the album's ninth track, "Drinking Again", as "exceptional, nuanced" and said that it "ranks among the best songs Sinatra cut during the '60s."

== Track listing ==
No.	Title	Writer(s)	Length
1.	"The World We Knew (Over and Over)"	Bert Kaempfert, Herbert Rehbein, Carl Sigman	2:47
2.	"Somethin' Stupid" (with Nancy Sinatra)	Carson Parks	2:42
3.	"This Is My Love"	Jim Harbert	3:33
4.	"Born Free"	Don Black, John Barry	2:02
5.	"Don't Sleep in the Subway"	Tony Hatch, Jackie Trent	2:19
6.	"This Town"	Lee Hazlewood	3:02
7.	"This Is My Song"	Charles Chaplin	2:27
8.	"You Are There"	Harry Sukman, Paul Francis Webster	3:28
9.	"Drinking Again"	Johnny Mercer, Doris Tauber	3:10
10.	"Some Enchanted Evening"	Richard Rodgers, Oscar Hammerstein II	2:35
Total length:			28:09

Notes

- Carson Parks is also known as C. Carson Parks
- Jim Harbert is also known as James Harbert
- Overdubs for "The World We Knew (Over and Over)" recorded on June 30 and July 1, 1967
- The Orchestra on "Somethin' Stupid" includes 10 Violins
- Background Vocals on "Don't Sleep in the Subway" recorded on July 27, 1967
- Basic Backing Tracks for (and Overdubs for unreleased version of) “This Town” was recorded on June 30, 1967
- Instrumental Overdubs for "This Town" recorded on July 27, 1967
- The Orchestra on "You Are There" includes 16 Violins, 6 Cellos, 3 French Horns and 7 Saxophones & Woodwinds
- The Orchestra on "Drinking Again" includes 12 Violins
- The Orchestra on Tracks 3–4 and 7 includes 21 Violins, 3 Cellos and 4 French Horns
- The Orchestra on Tracks 3–4 and 7–8 includes 6 Violas
- The Orchestra on Tracks 5, 8 and 10 includes 5 Trumpets
- The Orchestra on Tracks 5 and 10 includes 8 Violins
- Sessions held in United-Western Studios, Hollywood, California.

== Charts ==
=== Weekly charts ===
1967 weekly chart performance for The World We Knew
Chart (1967)	Peak position
UK Albums (OCC)	28
US Billboard 200	24
Chart (2015)	Peak position
Scottish Albums (OCC)	84

2025–2026 weekly chart performance for The World We Knew
Chart (2025–2026)	Peak position
US Top Jazz Albums (Billboard)	13

=== Monthly charts ===
2025 monthly chart performance for The World We Knew
Chart (2025)	Peak position
German Jazz Albums (Offizielle Top 100)	17
