= Big Cold Wind =

Single by Pat Boone

from the album Pat Boone's Golden Hits Featuring Speedy Gonzales
- B-side: "That's My Desire"
- Released: 1961
- Genre: Pop
- Length: 2:16
- Label: London
- Songwriters: Robert Mosely; Bob Elgin
- Producer: Randy Wood

Pat Boone singles chronology
"Moody River" (1961)	"Big Cold Wind" (1961)	"Johnny Will" (1961)

"Big Cold Wind" is a popular song written by Robert Mosely and Bob Elgin. It was recorded in 1961 by Pat Boone, peaking at number 19 on the Billboard Hot 100 and number 5 on the Easy Listening chart in the US.

== Charts ==
Chart (1961)	Peak position
US Billboard Hot 100	19
US Easy Listening	5
