= Candy Sweet =

Single by Pat Boone
- B-side: "Delia Gone"
- Released: July 18, 1960
- Recorded: 1960
- Genre: Pop
- Length: 2:05
- Label: Dot
- Composer(s): Winfield Scott

Pat Boone singles chronology
"Spring Rain" (1960)	"Candy Sweet" (1960)	"Dear John" (1960)

"Candy Sweet" is a song by Pat Boone that reached number 72 on the Billboard Hot 100 in 1960.

== Track listing ==
7" single (Dot 45-16122, 1960)
No.	Title	Writer(s)	Length
1.	"Candy Sweet"	Winfield Scott	2:05
2.	"Delia Gone"	Caperton Henley	3:05

== Charts ==
Chart (1960)	Peak position
US Billboard Hot 100	72
