= Let Your Yeah Be Yeah =

1971 hit single by The Pioneers

Single by The Pioneers
- Released: 1971
- Genre: Reggae
- Length: 3:10
- Label: Trojan
- Songwriter(s): Jimmy Cliff

Official audio
- "Let Your Yeah Be Yeah" on YouTube

"Let Your Yeah Be Yeah" is a reggae song written by Jamaican singer Jimmy Cliff. It was first recorded by the vocal trio the Pioneers, whose version, co-produced by Cliff, reached No. 5 on the UK Singles Chart in 1971.

== Background ==
The lyrics are based on Matthew 5:37; "But let your communication be, Yea, yea; Nay, nay: for whatsoever is more than these cometh of evil."

== Other recordings ==
- In 1973, it was recorded by American rock band Brownsville Station for their album Yeah!. Released as a single, it was the band's second song to chart on the Billboard Hot 100, reaching no. 57.
- Cliff also released the song as a single in 1975 on Island Records, but it did not chart.
- A cover of this song was recorded by Ali Campbell, the former lead singer of the British reggae band UB40, for his solo album, Big Love (1995). It was released as a single and reached no. 25 in the U.K.
- The Gamblers, reggae project of Booze & Glory frontman Marek Rusek, covered the song in early 2025.
