= Aretha (1961 album) =

Studio album by Aretha Franklin with the Ray Bryant Combo
- Released: February 27, 1961
- Recorded: August 1, 1960 – January 10, 1961
- Studio: Columbia Recording Studios, (New York City, New York)
- Genre: Vocal pop
- Length: 32:47
- Label: Columbia (CS8412)
- Producer: John H. Hammond

Aretha Franklin chronology
Aretha (1961)	The Electrifying Aretha Franklin (1962)

Singles from Aretha
- 1. "Love Is the Only Thing" Released: September 12, 1960; 2. "Won't Be Long" Released: December 23, 1960; 3. "Are You Sure" Released: April 3, 1961

Aretha is the debut studio album by American singer-songwriter Aretha Franklin, released on February 27, 1961, by Columbia Records. It features the Ray Bryant Combo. The album is Aretha's first release for Columbia, and is also known under its working title Right Now It's Aretha. Following in the footsteps of her close friend Sam Cooke, Aretha was "discovered" by famed Columbia Records producer John H. Hammond, who on the liner notes of the 1973 edition of "The Great Aretha Franklin: The First 12 Sides" mentions that she was in fact recommended by the composer Curtis Reginald Lewis. With the support of her father, Reverend C.L. Franklin, Aretha traveled to New York City's Columbia Record Studios to record her debut album for the label. Hammond paired Aretha Franklin with Ray Bryant and arranger J. Leslie McFarland, while taking charge of the album's production, which received mixed reviews.

The album showcases an 18-year-old Franklin, covering a range of pop standards. Columbia was experimenting to see what kind of music worked best with Aretha's style. Though rare to find an original 6-eye pressing on vinyl, Columbia Records re-released these sessions and retitled them as "The Great Aretha Franklin: The First 12 Sides", in 1972. The same recording "The Great Aretha Franklin: The First 12 Sides", was once more re-released on vinyl, this time in 1973 by CBS/Embassy, trademarks of Columbia Records, probably being a UK edition, which on the center label bears these identification numbers: EMB S-31006 (KC 31953). There are some minor changes in the track list for the 1973 edition as well. (See the separate track listing below the 1972 listing).

== Tracks ==
- The album was recorded at the New York studios of Columbia Records, 207 East 30th Street, except tracks 1 and 4 which were recorded at the company's studios at 799 Seventh Avenue.
- All songs produced by John Hammond and arranged by J. Leslie McFarland. Most feature Ray Bryant on piano.

== Track listing - 1972 Edition ==
=== Side One ===
1. "Won't Be Long" (J. Leslie McFarland) 3:12

Recorded on November 29, 1960
With John McFarland, piano; Bill Lee, bass guitar; Belton Evans, drums

2. "Over the Rainbow" (Harold Arlen, E.Y. Harburg) 2:42

Recorded on August 1, 1960
With Chauncey "Lord" Westbrook, Skeeter Best, guitar; Bill Lee, bass guitar; Osie Johnson, drums; Tyree Glenn, trombone

3. "Love Is the Only Thing" (J. Leslie McFarland) 2:44

Recorded on August 1, 1960
With Chauncey "Lord" Westbrook, Skeeter Best, guitar; Bill Lee, bass guitar; Osie Johnson, drums; Tyree Glenn, trombone; Paul Owens, vocal obbligato

4. "Sweet Lover" (J. Leslie McFarland, Sidney Wyche) 3:26

Recorded on December 19, 1960
With Bill Lee, bass guitar; Belton Evans, drums

5. "All Night Long" (Curtis Lewis) 3:01

Recorded on November 17, 1960
With Chauncey "Lord" Westbrook, guitar; Bill Lee, bass guitar; Belton Evans, drums; Al Sears, tenor saxophone; Quentin Jackson, trombone

6. "Who Needs You?" (Billie Holiday, Jeanne Burns) 2:50

Recorded on January 10, 1961
With Aretha Franklin, piano; Al Sears, tenor saxophone; Chauncey "Lord" Westbrook, guitar; Milt Hinton, bass guitar; Belton Evans, drums

=== Side Two ===
1. "Right Now" (J. Leslie McFarland) 2:27

Recorded on August 1, 1960
With Skeeter Best, guitar; Bill Lee, bass guitar; Osie Johnson, drums; Tyree Glenn, trombone

2. "Are You Sure" (Meredith Willson) 2:44

From the Broadway musical production of The Unsinkable Molly Brown
Recorded on January 10, 1961
With Aretha Franklin, piano; Al Sears, tenor saxophone; Chauncey "Lord" Westbrook, guitar; Milt Hinton, bass guitar; Belton Evans, drums

3. "Maybe I'm a Fool" (J. Leslie McFarland) 3:20

Working title: "Baby, I'm A Fool"
Recorded on January 10, 1961
With Aretha Franklin, piano; Al Sears, tenor saxophone; Chauncey "Lord" Westbrook, guitar; Milt Hinton, bass guitar; Belton Evans, drums

4. "It Ain't Necessarily So" (George Gershwin, Ira Gershwin) 2:57

Recorded on December 19, 1960
With Lucky Warren, tenor saxophone; Chauncey "Lord" Westbrook, guitar; Bill Lee, bass guitar; Belton Evans, drums

5. "By Myself" (J. Leslie McFarland, Joe Bailey) 2:42

Working title: "(Blue) By Myself"
Recorded on November 17, 1960
With Chauncey "Lord" Westbrook, guitar; Bill Lee, bass guitar; Belton Evans, drums; Al Sears, tenor saxophone; Quentin Jackson, trombone

6. "Today I Sing the Blues" (Curtis Lewis) 2:47

Recorded on August 1, 1960
With Chauncey "Lord" Westbrook, Skeeter Best, guitar; Bill Lee, bass guitar; Osie Johnson, drums; Tyree Glenn, trombone

=== Bonus Tracks ===
1. "Are You Sure (Rehearsal)" 2:17

Producer John Hammond announces the take number.

2. "Who Needs You? (Take 9)" 3:03
3. "Right Now (Take 1)" 2:13

With Aretha Franklin on piano.

4. "Maybe I'm a Fool (Take 4)" 3:57

=== Mono Mixes ===
1. "By Myself" 2:39
2. "Won't Be Long" 2:54
3. "All Night Long" 3:06
4. "Love Is the Only Thing" 2:44
5. "Right Now" 2:22

== Track listing - 1973 Edition ==
=== Side One ===
1. "Won't Be Long" (J. Leslie McFarland) 3:07

Recorded on November 29, 1960
With Ray Bryant, piano; William (Bill) Lee, bass; Belton (Sticks) Evans, drums; Aretha Franklin, piano

2. "Over The Rainbow" (Harold Arlen, E.Y. Harburg) 2:35

Recorded on August 1, 1960
With Ray Bryant, piano; Chauncey (Lord) Westbrook, guitar; William (Bill) Lee, bass; Osie Johnson, drums; Tyree Glenn, trombone

3. "Love Is The Only Thing" (J. Leslie McFarland) 2:38

Recorded on August 1, 1960
With Ray Bryant, piano; Chauncey (Lord) Westbrook, guitar; William (Bill) Lee, bass; Osie Johnson, drums; Tyree Glenn, trombone

4. "Sweet Lover" (J. Leslie McFarland, Sidney Wyche) 3:19

Recorded on November 29, 1960
With Ray Bryant, piano; William (Bill) Lee, bass; Belton (Sticks) Evans, drums

5. "All Night Long" (Curtis Lewis) 2:56

Recorded on November 17, 1960
With Ray Bryant, piano; Chauncey (Lord) Westbrook, guitar; Bill Lee, bass; Belton (Sticks) Evans, drums; Al Sears, tenor saxophone; Quentin Jackson, trombone

6. "Who Needs You?" (Billie Holiday, Jeanne Burns) 2:45

Recorded on January 10, 1961
With Aretha Franklin, piano; Al Sears, tenor saxophone; Chauncey (Lloyd) Westbrook, guitar; Milton John Milt Hinton, bass; Belton (Sticks) Evans, drums

=== Side Two ===
1. "Right Now" (J. Leslie McFarland) 2:20

Recorded on August 1, 1960
With Clifton (Skeeter) Best, guitar; William (Bill) Lee, bass; James Osie Johnson, drums; Tyree Glenn, trombone

2. "Are You Sure" (Meredith Willson) 2:38

From the Broadway musical production of The Unsinkable Molly Brown
Recorded on January 10, 1961
With Aretha Franklin, piano; Al Sears, tenor saxophone; Chauncey (Lord) Westbrook, guitar; Milton John Milt Hinton, bass; Belton (Sticks) Evans, drums

3. "Maybe I'm A Fool" (J. Leslie McFarland) 3:15

Working title: "Baby, I'm A Fool"
Recorded on January 10, 1961
With Aretha Franklin, piano; Al Sears, tenor saxophone; Chauncey (Lloyd) Westbrook, guitar; Milton John Milt Hinton, bass; Belton (Sticks) Evans, drums

4. "It Ain't Necessarily So" (George Gershwin, Ira Gershwin) 2:51

With Ray Bryant, piano; Warren Luckey, tenor saxophone; Chauncey (Lord) Westbrook, guitar; William (Bill) Lee, bass; Belton (Sticks) Evans, drums

5. "(Blue) By Myself" (J. Leslie McFarland, J. Bailey) 2:36

Working title: "(Blue) By Myself"
Recorded on November 17, 1960
With Ray Bryant, piano; Chauncey (Lord) Westbrook, guitar; Bill Lee, bass; Belton (Sticks) Evans, drums; Al Sears, tenor saxophone; Quentin Jackson, trombone

6. "Today I Sing the Blues" (Curtis Lewis) 2:45

Recorded on August 1, 1960
With Ray Bryant, piano; Chauncey (Lord) Westbrook, guitar; William (Bill) Lee, bass; Osie Johnson, drums; Tyree Glenn, trombone

The cover notes on this edition were written by John Hammond, October 5, 1972. Among other things he mentions that all the sides on the record were originally made as singles, primarily for the jukebox market. At the end he writes: For some strange reason, this album has always been something of a secret, and I can only hope that it gets across to a new generation of Aretha admirers. Let me hasten to add that there has been no overdubbing, rechanneling or other messing around with the pure gold of the original.
