= Walking the Floor Over You =

1941 single by Ernest Tubb

Single by Ernest Tubb
- B-side: "I'm Missing You"
- Released: May 28, 1941
- Recorded: April 26, 1941
- Studio: Fort Worth, Texas
- Genre: Honky-tonk
- Length: 2:37
- Label: Decca 5958
- Songwriter: Ernest Tubb

"Walking the Floor Over You"

Single by Pat Boone

from the album Pat Boone's Golden Hits Featuring Speedy Gonzales
- A-side: "Spring Rain"
- Released: 1960
- Recorded: 1960
- Genre: Pop
- Length: 2:20
- Label: Dot
- Songwriter: Ernest Tubb

Pat Boone singles chronology
"Words" (1960)	"Walking the Floor Over You" / "Spring Rain" (1960)	"Candy Sweet" / "Delia Gone" (1960)

"Walking the Floor Over You" is a country music song written by Ernest Tubb, recorded on April 26, 1941 in Fort Worth, Texas, and released in the United States that year.

The original version included only Tubb's vocals and acoustic guitar accompanied by "Smitty" Smith on electric guitar. Tubb later re-recorded the song with his band, the Texas Troubadours.

The original single became a hit, reaching the number-23 spot in the charts in 1941 but eventually the song sold over a million copies. Critic David Vinopal called "Walking the Floor Over You" the first honky tonk song that launched the musical genre itself. Tubb's version is heard on the soundtrack of the 1980 film Coal Miner's Daughter.

In 1998, the 1941 recording was inducted into the Grammy Hall of Fame.

In 2022, the single was selected by the Library of Congress for preservation in the United States National Recording Registry as being "culturally, historically, or aesthetically significant".

== Other recordings ==
Ernest Tubb himself re-recorded the song several times during his career, with those versions recorded in 1944, 1959, 1963, and 1977. Additionally, Tubb recorded another version with Merle Haggard and Charlie Daniels in 1979; that version reached number 31 on the Billboard Hot Country Singles chart that fall.

- Bing Crosby recorded the song for Decca Records on May 27, 1942, with Bob Crosby's Bob Cats.
- Georgia Gibbs recorded the song as "I'm Walking the Floor Over You" in 1957 and it charted briefly in the Billboard Hot 100 in the number-92 spot.
- Pat Boone recorded the song in 1959, and it had a modest success reaching number 44 in the Billboard Hot 100, and #39 in the UK charts in 1960.
- Patti Page included the song on her album Patti Page Sings Country And Western Golden Hits (1961)
- Glen Campbell included the song on his album Too Late to Worry – Too Blue to Cry (1963).
- Mississippi John Hurt performed a cover of the song in his recordings for the Library of Congress in 1963.
- Sandy Denny recorded the song during sessions for her album The North Star Grassman and the Ravens (1971).

== See also ==
- "Set 'Em Up Joe"
