= Love All the Hurt Away =

1981 studio album by Aretha Franklin

Studio album by Aretha Franklin
- Released: August 20, 1981
- Studios: Cherokee Studios, Wally Heider Studios and Sunset Sound Recorders (Hollywood, California); Atlantic Studios (New York City, New York)
- Genres: R&B; pop; funk
- Length: 45:14
- Label: Arista
- Producers: Arif Mardin; Aretha Franklin

Aretha Franklin chronology
| Aretha Sings the Blues (1980) | Love All the Hurt Away (1981) | Jump to It (1982) |

Singles from Love All the Hurt Away
- 1. "Love All the Hurt Away" Released: August 1981; 2. "Hold On, I'm Comin'" Released: October 1981 (Not in U.S.)

Love All the Hurt Away is the twenty-seventh studio album by American singer Aretha Franklin, released in mid 1981. This album is the singer's second release under the Arista Records label. The Arif Mardin-produced disc reached fourth place on Billboard's R&B albums chart and number 36 on the main Billboard album chart, selling roughly 250,000 copies in the US.

== Background ==
Franklin's cover version of Sam & Dave's classic hit "Hold On, I'm Comin'" won Franklin her 11th Grammy Award in the Best R&B Vocal Performance, Female category. The award was her first Grammy win since 1975. After its original release, the album was re-issued on CD in 2012 by Cherry Red Records and it also included three bonus tracks.

== Critical reception ==
Professional ratings
Review scores
| Source | Rating |
|---|---|
| AllMusic | 2/5 stars |
| Robert Christgau | A− |
| Record Mirror | 3/5 stars |
| The Rolling Stone Album Guide | 3/5 stars |

The Rolling Stone Album Guide deemed the album "a funky pop near-triumph."

== Track listing ==
Credits adapted from the liner notes of Love All the Hurt Away.

| No. | Title | Writer(s) | Length |
|---|---|---|---|
| 1. | "Love All the Hurt Away" (duet with George Benson) | Sam Dees | 4:09 |
| 2. | "Hold On, I'm Comin'" | David Porter, Isaac Hayes | 5:14 |
| 3. | "Living in the Streets" | Rod Temperton | 3:53 |
| 4. | "There's a Star for Everyone" | Allee Willis, Don Yowell, David Lasley | 4:26 |
| 5. | "You Can't Always Get What You Want" | Mick Jagger, Keith Richards | 5:18 |
| 6. | "It's My Turn" | Carole Bayer Sager, Michael Masser | 5:30 |
| 7. | "Truth and Honesty" | Burt Bacharach, Bayer Sager, Peter Allen | 4:15 |
| 8. | "Search On" | Chuck Jackson | 4:47 |
| 9. | "Whole Lot of Me" | Aretha Franklin | 3:23 |
| 10. | "Kind of Man" | Franklin | 4:19 |

2012 reissue bonus tracks
| No. | Title | Writer(s) | Length |
|---|---|---|---|
| 11. | "Hold On, I'm Comin'" (12" version) | Porter, Hayes | 6:44 |
| 12. | "Livin' in the Streets" (12" version) | Temperton | 6:17 |
| 13. | "It's My Turn" (single version) | Bayer Sager, Masser | 4:03 |

== Personnel ==
=== Musicians ===
- Aretha Franklin – lead vocals, backing vocals (3), acoustic piano (6–9)
- David Foster – electric piano (1, 3), synthesizers (1)
- Robbie Buchanan – Minimoog (2), acoustic piano (4)
- Greg Phillinganes – acoustic piano (2, 10), synthesizers (3, 4, 6, 7, 10), synth solo (3), keyboards (4), Minimoog (5), electric piano (6)
- David Paich – electric piano (5, 7–9)
- Buzz Feiten – guitars (1), guitar solo (7)
- David Williams – guitars (2, 4–9, 10), bass (3)
- Steve Lukather – guitars (5–9)
- Louis Johnson – bass (1, 3)
- Marcus Miller – bass (2, 4, 5, 7–10)
- Abraham Laboriel – bass (6)
- Jeff Porcaro – drums
- Paulinho da Costa – percussion (1, 3, 5)
- Steve Ferrone – tambourine (7)
- Eddie Daniels – alto saxophone (1)
- Phil Ayling – recorder solo (10)
- Ronnie Cuber – saxophones (2, 3), woodwinds (8–10)
- Jim Horn – saxophones (2, 3), woodwinds (8–10)
- Gary Herbig – saxophones (2, 3), woodwinds (8–10)
- Seldon Powell – saxophones (2, 3), woodwinds (8–10)
- William Slapin – saxophones (2, 3), woodwinds (8–10)
- Larry Williams – saxophones (2, 3), woodwinds (8–10)
- Urbie Green – trombone (2, 3)
- Bill Reichenbach Jr. – trombone (2, 3)
- Jon Faddis – trumpet (2, 3)
- Gary Grant – trumpet (2, 3)
- Jerry Hey – trumpet (2, 3)
- Joe Shepley – trumpet (2, 3)
- Harry Bluestone – concertmaster (3, 6, 8–10)
- Gene Orloff – concertmaster (3, 6, 8–10)
- George Benson – lead vocals (1)
- Marci Levy – additional backing vocals (1), backing vocals (3–5, 7, 8)
- Mark Stevens – additional backing vocals (1), backing vocals ( 3–5)
- Margaret Branch – backing vocals (2, 4–6)
- Estelle Brown – backing vocals (2, 4, 6, 7)
- Cissy Houston – backing vocals (2, 4, 6, 7)
- Darlene Love – backing vocals (2, 4, 6, 7)
- David Lasley – backing vocals (4, 5)
- Arnold McCuller – backing vocals (4, 5)
- Jo Ann Harris – backing vocals (5, 7, 8)
- Myrna Smith – backing vocals (6, 7)
- Lynda Laurence – backing vocals (7, 8)

Choir on "You Can't Always Get What You Want"

- Rev. James Cleveland – choir director

Choir singers

- Alonzo Athens
- Debbie Austin
- Darold Conway
- Darryl Hardy
- Jo Ann Harris
- Marva Hines
- Betty Hollans
- Cleo Kennedy
- Lynda Laurence
- Marci Levy
- Herman Ludlow
- Esther McIsaac

Music arrangements

- Arif Mardin – arrangements (1, 4), horn arrangements (2), rhythm arrangements (2, 7–9), string arrangements (6, 10), woodwind arrangements (8–10)
- Aretha Franklin – BGV arrangements (2, 4, 6, 7), rhythm arrangements (7–9)
- Larry Williams – horn arrangements (2), string arrangements (8, 9), woodwind arrangements (8, 9)
- Jerry Hey – horn arrangements (3), string arrangements (3, 6)
- Rod Temperton – BGV arrangements (3), horn arrangements (3), rhythm arrangements (3), string arrangements (3)

=== Production ===
- Arif Mardin – producer, liner notes, mixing (2, 5)
- Aretha Franklin – producer (7, 9, 10), cover concept
- Jeremy Smith – recording engineer
- Lew Hahn – additional recording, remixing (1, 3, 4, 6–10), mixing (2, 5)
- Terry Christian – assistant engineer
- Steve McManus – assistant engineer
- Michael O'Reilly – assistant engineer, mixing (2, 5)
- Jim Simon – assistant engineer
- Frank DeCaro – production coordinator
- Chrissy Allerdings – production assistant
- Ria Lewerke-Shapiro – art direction, design
- George Hurrell – photography
