= Laughing on the Outside =

1963 studio album by Aretha Franklin

Studio album by Aretha Franklin
- Released: August 12, 1963
- Recorded: April 17, 1963; June 12–14, 1963
- Studio: Columbia Recording Studios, (New York/Hollywood)
- Genre: Jazz, soul, traditional pop, R&B
- Length: 41:00
- Label: Columbia (8879)
- Producer: Robert Mersey

Aretha Franklin chronology
| The Tender, the Moving, the Swinging Aretha Franklin (1962) | Laughing on the Outside (1963) | Unforgettable: A Tribute to Dinah Washington (1964) |

Professional ratings
Review scores
| Source | Rating |
|---|---|
| AllMusic | 3/5 stars |
| Record Mirror | 3/5 stars |

Laughing on the Outside is the fourth studio album by American singer Aretha Franklin, released on August 12, 1963, by Columbia Records. The album was recorded at Columbia Recording Studios in New York and Hollywood. These sessions found a 21-year-old Aretha Franklin recording Jazz and Pop music standards, from Johnny Mercer to Duke Ellington. She is backed by the arrangements of Columbia producer Robert Mersey. One of the most popular songs from the album is Franklin's interpretation of the classic "Skylark". A minute and fifty-eight seconds into the song, she sings the word "Skylark" with power and emotion. This was one of the first times in which she recorded one of her written compositions, "I Wonder (Where Are You Tonight)", on an album. Though somewhat overlooked in her Columbia catalogue, this album was jointly re-released with The Electrifying Aretha Franklin in June 2008.

== Track listing ==
=== Side One ===
1. "Skylark" (Johnny Mercer, Hoagy Carmichael) – 2:49
2. "For All We Know" (Sam M. Lewis, J. Fred Coots) – 3:25
3. "Make Someone Happy" (Betty Comden, Adolph Green, Jule Styne) – 3:48
4. "I Wonder (Where Are You Tonight)" (Aretha Franklin, Ted White) – 3:16
5. "Solitude" (Duke Ellington, Eddie DeLange, Irving Mills) – 3:50
6. "Laughing on the Outside" (Bernie Wayne, Ben Raleigh) – 3:14

=== Side Two ===
1. "Say It Isn't So" (Irving Berlin) – 3:05
2. "Until The Real Thing Comes Along" (Sammy Cahn, Saul Chaplin, L. E. Freeman) – 3:04
3. "If Ever I Would Leave You" (Alan Jay Lerner, Frederick Loewe) – 4:04
4. "Where Are You?" (Harold Adamson, Jimmy McHugh) – 3:50
5. "Mr. Ugly" – 3:22 (Norman Mapp)
6. "I Wanna Be Around" (Johnny Mercer, Sadie Vimmerstedt) – 2:25

=== Bonus Tracks on Later Re-issues ===
1. "Ol' Man River" (Jerome Kern, Oscar Hammerstein II) – 4:01

=== Mono Mixes ===
1. "You've Got Her" (working title "Let Me Be") (Fred Johnson, Leroy Kirkland, Pearl Woods, Terry Melcher) – 2:40
2. "Here's Where I Came In (Here's Where I Walk Out)" (Art Wayne, Ben Raleigh) – 2:53
3. "Say It Isn't So" (Irving Berlin) – 3:08

== Personnel ==
- Aretha Franklin – vocals
- Robert Mersey – producer, arranger, conductor
- Earl Van Dyke, Dave Grusin, Andrew Acker, Leon Russell – piano
- C. Bosler, Ray Pohlman, Melvin Pollan – bass guitar
- Hindel Butts, Hal Blaine – drums
- Don Arnome, Tommy Tedesco, Billy Strange – guitar
- Jimmy Nottingham – trumpet
- Robert Ascher – trombone
- Plas Johnson – saxophone
- Bernard Eichenbaum, Julius Schacter, Leo Kahn, Berl Senofsky, Felix Gigol, Max Pollikoff, George Ockner, John Rublowsky, Sid Sharp, Tibor Zelig, George Poole, Irving Lipschultz, Irving Weinper, Darrel Terwilliger – violin
- R. Dickler, Theodore Israel, Jacob Glick – viola
- Jesse Erlich, Anthony Twardowsky, Joseph Tekula – cello
