= With the Wind and the Rain in Your Hair =

Single by Pat Boone
- B-side: "Good Rockin' Tonight"
- Released: 1959
- Recorded: 1958
- Genre: pop
- Length: 2:35
- Label: Dot
- Composer: Clara Edwards
- Lyricist: Jack Lawrence

Pat Boone singles chronology
| "I'll Remember Tonight" / "The Mardi Gras March" (1958) | "With the Wind and the Rain in Your Hair" / "Good Rockin' Tonight" (1959) | "For a Penny" / "The Wang Dang Taffy-Apple Tango" (1959) |

Audio
- "With the Wind and the Rain in Your Hair" on YouTube

"With the Wind and the Rain in Your Hair" is a song composed by Clara Edwards, with lyrics by Jack Lawrence. First published in 1930, it became a hit a decade later.

A recording by Kay Kyser and His Orchestra (with vocal refrain by Ginny Simms) dates from November 28, 1939 and was issued on a Columbia 78 rpm record (cat. nr. 35350) in 1940.

Bob Crosby recorded the song with his orchestra on February 13, 1940 and it was released on a Decca 78 rpm (cat. nr. 3018) in March. His version spent 14 weeks on the Billboard' Best Selling Retail Records chart, peaking at number two for three weeks.

Another hit version was by Bob Chester featuring Dolores O'Neill on vocals (b/w "I Walk with Music", Bluebird 10614), it peaked at number 18 in April 1940.

In late 1959, a version by Pat Boone reached number 21 on the Billboard Hot 100.

== Charts ==
Pat Boone's version

| Chart (1959) | Peak position |
|---|---|
| UK Singles (Official Charts) | 21 |
| US Billboard Hot 100 | 21 |
