= Spring Rain (Pat Boone song) =

Single by Pat Boone
- A-side: "Spring Rain" "Walking the Floor over You"
- Released: 1960
- Length: 2:53
- Label: Dot
- Songwriter(s): Fay Tishman

Pat Boone singles chronology
"Words" (1960)	"Spring Rain" / "Walking the Floor over You" (1960)	"Candy Sweet" / "Delia Gone" (1960)

"Spring Rain" is a song by Pat Boone that reached number 50 on the Billboard Hot 100 in 1960.

== Track listing ==
7" single (Dot 45-16073, 1960)
No.	Title	Writer(s)	Length
1.	"Spring Rain"	Fay Tishman	2:53
2.	"Walking the Floor over You"	Ernest Tubb	2:20

== Charts ==
Chart (1960)	Peak position
US Billboard Hot 100	50
