= Tennessee Ramblers (North Carolina band) =

The Tennessee Ramblers
- Also known as: Hartman's Tennessee Ramblers; Hartman's Heart Breakers; Washboard Wonders
- Origin: Charlotte, North Carolina, U.S.
- Genres: Country
- Years active: c. 1928–1949
- Labels: Bluebird
- Past members: Dick Hartman; Harry Blair; Cecil Campbell; Kenneth Wolfe; Fred Morris; Elmer Warren; Jack Gillette; Kelland Clark; Betty Lou DeMorrow; Roy Lear; Tex Martin; Don White

The Tennessee Ramblers were an American Country and Western swing band that originally consisted of Dick Hartman (1898–1962) on mandolin and vocals, Harry Blair on guitar and vocals, Kenneth Wolfe on fiddle, and Cecil Campbell on banjo and steel guitar. Hartman formed the band in 1928 to perform on Pittsburgh radio station KDKA. In 1934, the band moved to Charlotte, North Carolina, which remained their base for most of the band's lifespan. While in Charlotte, the group played on WBT.

By the time the Tennessee Ramblers made their first recording for Bluebird Records in 1935, they had added bassist Fred Morris, fiddler Elmer Warren, and a novelty musician named Jack Gillette. Although Hartman left the group in 1938, the band continued performing under the leadership of Gillette.

In 1949, Harry Blair retired, leaving Campbell as the last remaining original member. Campbell continued using the band's name, however, until the 1980s.
