= Unforgettable: A Tribute to Dinah Washington =

1964 studio album by Aretha Franklin

Studio album by Aretha Franklin
- Released: February 18, 1964
- Recorded: February 7–10, 1964
- Studio: Columbia Recording Studios, (New York/Hollywood)
- Genre: Jazz, soul, blues, R&B
- Length: 37:35
- Label: Columbia
- Producer: Robert Mersey (original), John Snyder (reissue)

Aretha Franklin chronology
Laughing on the Outside (1963)	Unforgettable: A Tribute to Dinah Washington (1964)	Runnin' Out of Fools (1964)

Unforgettable: A Tribute to Dinah Washington is the fifth studio album by American singer Aretha Franklin. Released on February 18, 1964, by Columbia Records, the album is a tribute dedicated to the recently deceased singer Dinah Washington. The sessions were recorded in New York. A few tunes were cut with strings in order to bring out the essential ballad character of the songs (with the help of Bob Mersey's arranging); most of the tracks, though, were made with the assistance of a small and sympathetic accompanying group for which Mersey supplied minimal written guidance.

== Release ==
"I first heard Dinah when I was just a kid," said Franklin, "back around the time she made 'Fat Daddy.' I never got to know her personally in those days, though she and my father were good friends. The idea of recording a tribute to her grew out of the way I've always felt about her. I didn't try to do the songs the same way she did them, necessarily - just the way they felt best, whether they happened to be similar or different."

== Reception ==
Professional ratings
Review scores
Source	Rating
Allmusic	link

In January 1995, John Snyder, the producer of the reissue, said: "...This is a very soulful record, a record of inspired singing by one of the great voices of our time. That makes it a 'must-have' and a record that is once again 'current.' It's that kind of work: Ms. Franklin's performance makes it timeless. Many of the songs, you may recognize, are her current hits."

== Track listing ==
=== Side One ===
1. "Unforgettable" (Irving Gordon) – 3:39
2. "Cold, Cold Heart" (Hank Williams) – 4:35
3. "What a Diff'rence a Day Made" (Stanley Adams, María Méndez Grever) – 3:30
4. "Drinking Again" (Johnny Mercer, Doris Tauber) – 3:28
5. "Nobody Knows the Way I Feel This Morning" (Tom Delaney, Pearl Delaney) – 5:10

=== Side Two ===
1. "Evil Gal Blues" (Lionel Hampton, Leonard Feather) – 2:40
2. "Don't Say You're Sorry Again" (Lee Pearl, Art Berman, Eugene West) – 2:45
3. "This Bitter Earth" (Clyde Otis) – 4:33
4. "If I Should Lose You" (Ralph Rainger, Leo Robin) – 3:36
5. "Soulville" (Titus Turner, Morris Levy, Henry Glover, Dinah Washington) – 2:20

=== Bonus tracks on later re-issues ===
Reissue by Legacy's Rhythm & Soul Series in 1995 included "Lee Cross". This song was recorded at the same time as the other tunes and is the only song not released on the original album. It was first released several years later on Take It Like You Give It and became one of Franklin's biggest hits on Columbia.

1. "Lee Cross" (Ted White) – 3:19

== Personnel ==
- Aretha Franklin – vocals, piano
- Ernie Hayes – piano, organ
- Paul Griffin – organ
- George Duvivier – bass guitar
- Gary Chester – drums
- Teddy Charles – vibraphone
- Ernie Royal – trumpet
- Bob Asher – trombone
- Buddy Lucas – tenor saxophone, harmonica
- Strings arranged and conducted by Robert Mersey

== Production ==
- Original recordings produced by Robert Mersey
- Legacy's Rhythm & Soul Series Director: Adam Block
- Reissue Producer: John Snyder
- Remixed and digitally mastered by Vic Anesini, Sony Music Studios, New York
- Art Direction: Tony Sellari
- Design: C.M.O.N.
- Original Jacket Cover: John Berg
- Interior Photos: Sony Music Photo Library
- Packaging Manager: Robert Constanzo
