= Won't Be Long (Aretha Franklin song) =

Single by Aretha Franklin

from the album Aretha
- B-side: "Right Now"
- Released: December 1960
- Genre: Soul
- Length: 3:18
- Label: Columbia 41923
- Songwriter(s): J. Leslie McFarland
- Producer(s): John Hammond

Aretha Franklin singles chronology
"Today I Sing the Blues" (1960)	"Won't Be Long" (1960)	"Are You Sure" (1961)

"Won't Be Long" is a song written by J. Leslie McFarland and performed by Aretha Franklin. The song reached number 7 on the U.S. R&B chart and number 76 on the Billboard Hot 100 in 1961. The song appeared on her 1961 album, Aretha. The song was produced by John Hammond.

== Chart performance ==
=== Aretha Franklin ===
Chart	Peak position
U.S. R&B chart	7
Billboard Hot 100	76

== Other recordings ==
The song has been recorded by numerous artists, including Dusty Springfield, Sly & the Family Stone, and Eva Cassidy.
