= Sydney Crooks =

Jamaican singer

- Also known as: Sidney Crooks, Sidney George, Luddy Pioneer, Luddy Crooks
- Born: Sydney Roy Crooks; 24 February 1945 (age 80); Westmoreland, Jamaica
- Genres: Ska, rocksteady, reggae
- Occupations: Singer-songwriter, record producer
- Instrument: Vocals
- Years active: 1962–present
- Labels: Trojan

Sydney Crooks (born Sydney Roy Crooks, 24 February 1945, Westmoreland, Jamaica), also known as Sidney Crooks, Sidney Roy, Luddy Pioneer, Luddy Crooks, Brother Coleand now Norris Cole, is a Jamaican singer and record producer, and founder and original member of the classic Jamaican vocal trio The Pioneers since 1962.

== Biography ==
Crooks was born in Westmoreland and after moving to Trench Town aged 17, entered the music business in 1962 first as a member of The Spectaculars, and The Counts, and finally as founder member and lead of the vocal trio The Pioneers, along with his brother Derrick and Winston Hewitt. Crooks began working for Joe Gibbs at his record shop, which helped get his group The Pioneers studio time. The Pioneers had a series of hit singles between 1968 and 1971, and continued to release albums until the mid-1970s.

Crooks, who had been based in London since 1970, moved into production, and worked with some of reggae's biggest names in the 1970s, including Dennis Brown (Superstar), Dennis Alcapone (Belch It Off), and Gregory Isaacs (All I Have is Love). He also produced skinhead reggae tracks with a science fiction/comic book theme, such as "Outer Space" and "Return of Batman", these credited to the Sidney All Stars, and early records by Junior English. In the 1980s, he went on to produce work by Justin Hinds, Owen Gray, and Marcia Griffiths (Rock My Soul).

Crooks returned to Kingston, Jamaica in 1996 to become the in-house arranger and engineer and producer at Joe Gibbs' recording studio. Crooks continued performing and recording with The Pioneers until 1989, when they split up to concentrate on separate careers.
