= Drinking Again =

1962 torch song

"Drinking Again" is a 1962 torch song, with lyrics by Johnny Mercer and music by Doris Tauber. The song has been recorded by Frank Sinatra (The World We Knew), Dinah Washington (Drinking Again), Aretha Franklin (Unforgettable: A Tribute to Dinah Washington), and Bette Midler (Bette Midler), among others.

The song was recorded by The Jeff Beck Group in 1968 (with altered lyrics and music) as "I've Been Drinking".
