= Today I Sing the Blues =

Single by Aretha Franklin

from the album Aretha
- B-side: "Love is the Only Thing"
- Released: October, 1960
- Studio: Atlantic Studios (New York, NY)
- Genre: Blues
- Length: 2:47
- Label: Columbia Records 41793
- Songwriter(s): Curtis Lewis
- Producer(s): John Hammond

Aretha Franklin singles chronology
"Precious Lord (Part 1)" (1959)	"Today I Sing the Blues" (1960)	"Won't Be Long" (1960)

"Today I Sing the Blues" is a song written by Curtis Lewis and performed by Aretha Franklin. The song reached number 10 on the U.S. R&B chart in 1960. The song appeared on her 1961 album, Aretha. The song was produced by John Hammond. Franklin re-recorded the song in 1969 on the album Soul '69 and it reached number 101 on the U.S. pop chart. It also charted on the Cash Box Top 100 chart.

"Today I Sing the Blues", originally written in 1948 and recorded the same year by Helen Humes and Buck Clayton's Orchestra, was included in the second album of Sam Cooke, Encore, recorded in 1958.

== Chart performance ==
=== Aretha Franklin ===
Chart	Peak position
U.S. R&B chart	10
U.S. Pop chart	101

== Cover versions ==
- In 2012, Christine Anu covered the song on her album Rewind: The Aretha Franklin Songbook.
