= John Leslie McFarland =

US-american popular music composer and arranger

John Leslie McFarland (May 12, 1926 – January 14, 1971) was an American popular music composer and arranger.

== Career ==
Early in his career, McFarland wrote several songs for Bill Haley and His Comets: "Rockin' Rollin' Rover", "You Hit The Wrong Note Billy Goat", co-writing "Teenager's Mother" with Curtis R. Lewis.

One of McFarland's earliest songs, co-written with Billy Moore Jr., was "You Dyed Your Hair Chartreuse". It was recorded by Louis Jordan in 1950.

In 1959, he co-wrote "Wang Dang Taffy Apple Tango" with Aaron Schroeder, and the song was recorded by Pat Boone. In 1960, McFarland also co-wrote the hit "Dreamin'" for Johnny Burnette with Aaron Schroeder.

McFarland co-wrote the song "Stuck On You" with Aaron Schroeder for Elvis Presley. The song was Presley's first hit single after two years in the US Army, recorded March 1960. The single rose to number one on the Billboard Hot 100 chart in late-April of that year, and became Presley's thirteenth hit overall. "Stuck On You" was one of six Elvis Presley songs featured in the 2002 Disney movie Lilo & Stitch.

McFarland arranged the songs on Aretha Franklin's debut album for Columbia Records Aretha: With The Ray Bryant Combo and wrote six songs for the album: "Won't Be Long", "Love Is The Only Thing", "Sweet Lover", "Right Now", "Maybe I'm A Fool", and "Blue By Myself".

In 1962, McFarland wrote four songs on Franklin's second studio album with Columbia, The Electrifying Aretha Franklin.

McFarland co-wrote the song "Little Children" with Mort Shuman for Billy J. Kramer & The Dakotas. The song reached number one in the UK Singles Chart in March 1964, and number seven in the US Hot 100 singles chart later the same year.

In 1967 he co-wrote "Long Legged Girl (with the Short Dress On)" with Winfield Scott for Elvis Presley, and it reached #63 on the Billboard Hot 100.

McFarland struggled with alcohol addiction throughout much of his career.
