= Michael Tippett (businessman) =

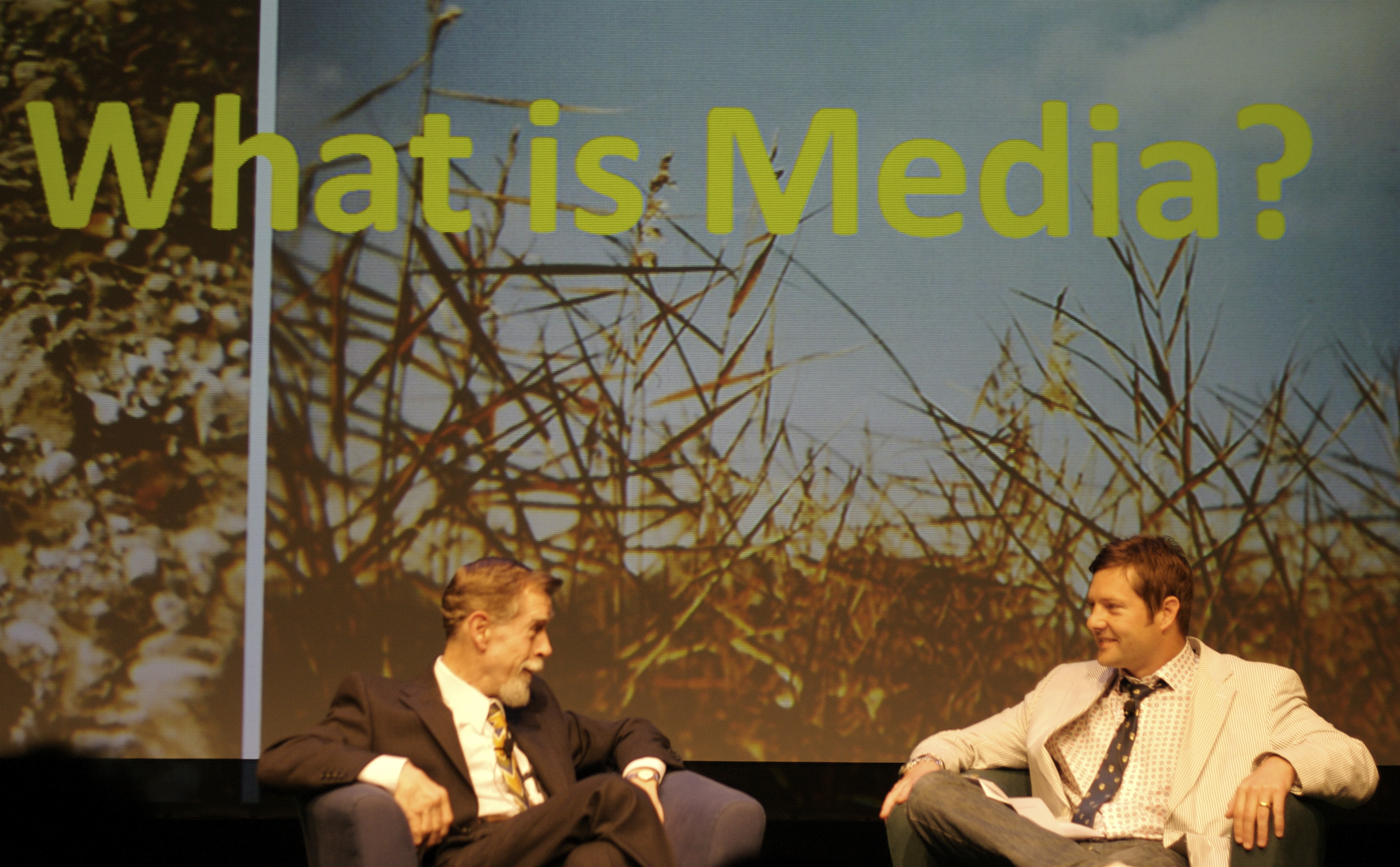
Michael Tippett interviewing Eric McCluhan, Vancouver BC 2008

Michael Tippett (born February 23, 1970) is a Canadian entrepreneur, columnist and educator.

== Early life and career ==
He was the founder of NowPublic which was a user-generated social news website. In 2009 the site was nominated for an Emmy in Advanced Technology. In August 2009 NowPublic was acquired by billionaire Phillip Anschutz for a reported 25 million dollars. In 2009, Tippett was recognized by the British Columbia New Media Association with an award for visionary leadership.

Prior to his involvement in NowPublic, Tippett was the Director of Marketing for Afternic.com. Afternic was acquired by Register.com for $60 million in 2001. At Register Tippett was the Director of Channel Marketing for the company and then General Manager for one of The Company's five divisions.

He lives in Vancouver, British Columbia. He is the brother of Jonathan Tippett of the Mondo Spider and is also related to Michael Tippett, the composer. He is married to Kate Armstrong and has 2 children.

Tippett is a member of the University of British Columbia’s School of Journalism Advisory Board, The Capilano University, Advisory Committee and is also a board member of CABINET, a Vancouver-based arts organization. In 2004 he collaborated with Kate Armstrong to produce Grafik Dynamo, a net art piece that loads live images from blogs and news sources on the web into a live action comic strip. Grafik Dynamo was a commission of Turbulence, made possible with funding from the Andy Warhol Foundation for the Visual Arts.

Tippett graduated from Queen's University with a degree in Philosophy.

Tippett works at technology company Later.com.
