= Picture You =

Picture You may refer to:

- "Picture You", a song by Chappell Roan from The Rise and Fall of a Midwest Princess
- "Picture You", a song by Mumford & Sons from Delta
- Picture You, an album by The Amazing
- "Picture You", a song by Kaleida (band)
