= Leonard Brody =

Canadian businessman and author

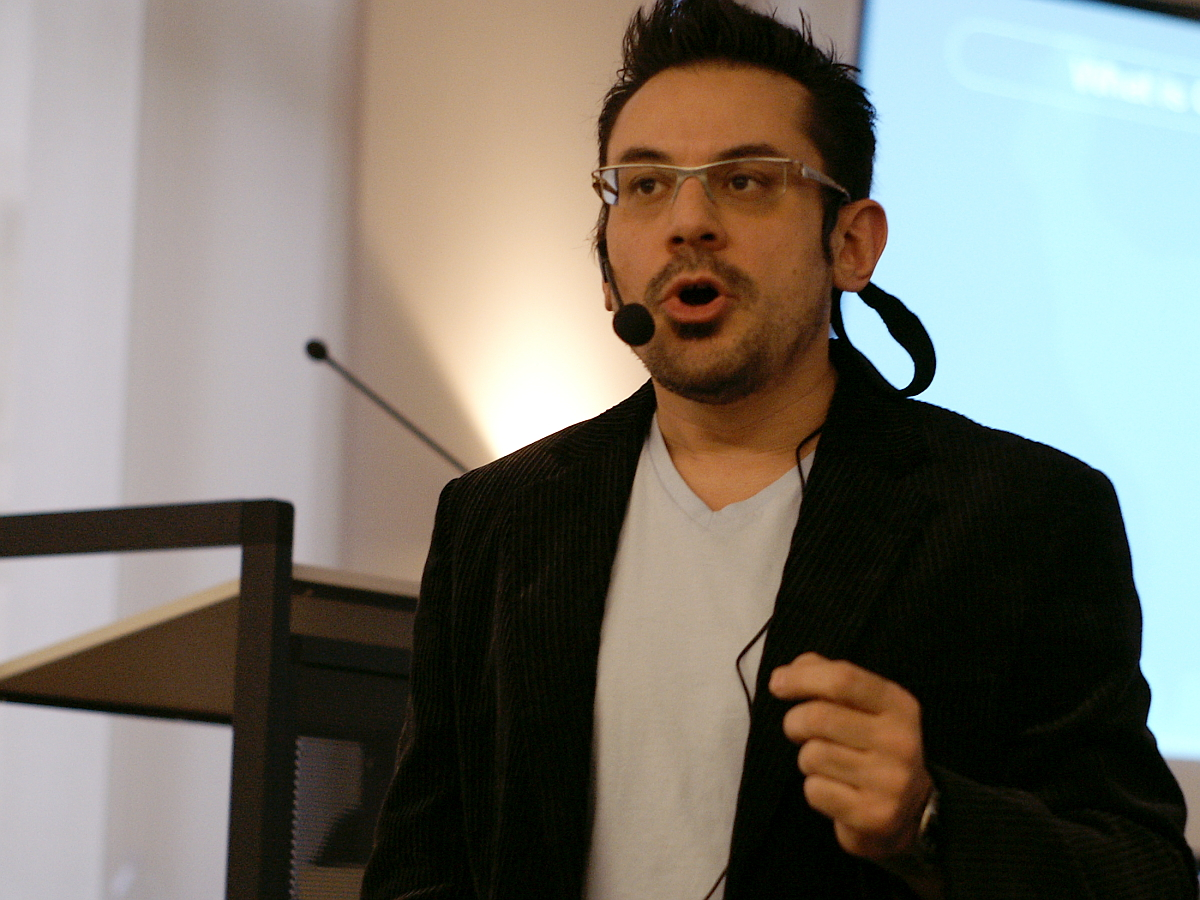
- Education: Queen's University Honours Bachelor of Arts; Harvard Business School
- Occupations: venture capitalist and author

Leonard Brody is a Canadian venture capitalist and author. He has helped in raising money for startup companies, been through a number of internet IPOs and has been involved in the building, financing and/or sale of more than five companies to date.

In 2004, Brody co-founded, and was CEO of, NowPublic, a citizen journalism online news source. In 2007, the company was named by Time Magazine as one of the best 50 websites in the world and was inducted into the Newseum in Washington DC. Nowpublic was acquired by the Anschutz Corporation in 2009. Currently, Brody sits as the President of the Clarity Digital Group responsible for overseeing one of the largest online news conglomerates in the world including Examiner.com and NowPublic, which, between them, share over 30 million unique visitors a month and over 300,000 contributors.

Brody was the Senior Technology Advisor to the Canadian Minister of Foreign Affairs & International Trade. Currently, he is one of the co-founders of GrowLab, a Vancouver & San Francisco based accelerator.

His work has been featured in such publications as Fortune, the Wall Street Journal, the BBC and the New York Times . He is co-author of the best selling books, "Innovation Nation: Canadian Leadership from Jurassic Park to Java" and "Everything I Needed to Know About Business...I Learned from a Canadian" both published by John Wiley & Sons.

Brody holds an Honours Bachelor of Arts from Queen's University, a law degree from Osgoode Hall and is a graduate of the Private Equity Course at the Harvard Business School.

Brody owned a stake in Coventry City Football Club in the UK and until November 2011 served on the board.

== Early life ==
Brody was born in Calgary, Alberta, on June 4, 1971.

== Career ==
Brody was part of the initial executive team at Onvia Canada; in 2000, the company was voted Canada's top startup and subsequently completed a $240 million initial public offering on NASDAQ.

After the sale of NowPublic, Brody became president of the Innovation and Digital Group at the Anschutz Corporation, where he worked on digital strategy for its sports and entertainment holdings, including the O2 Arena in London, the Los Angeles Lakers, the Los Angeles Galaxy, and the Los Angeles Kings. He later became Co-Founder and Executive Chairman of Caravan, and a co-founder of Hai, a smart-home shower product company.

Brody has served as Chairman of Creative Labs, a venture launched jointly with Creative Artists Agency. He co-created The Great Rewrite, a research and thought-leadership project produced with Forbes and KPMG examining periods of disruption and change in business.

== Personal life ==
Brody has been a co-owner of Coventry City F.C.

== Bibliography ==
- Innovation Nation: Canadian Leadership from Jurassic Park to Java. ISBN 0-470-83202-9 (with Ken Grant, Matt Holland (writer) - Toronto: Wiley, 2002.
- Everything I Needed to Know About Business...I learned from a Canadian. Toronto: Wiley, 2005. ISBN 0-470-83637-7 (with David Raffa)
