= John Wick (soundtrack) =

John Wick: Original Motion Picture Soundtrack

Film score by Tyler Bates and Joel J. Richard
- Released: October 21, 2014 (digital); October 27, 2014 (physical)
- Recorded: 2014
- Genres: Soundtrack hip hop electronic rock
- Length: 62:33
- Label: Varèse Sarabande
- Producers: Tyler Bates; Joel J. Richard; Dylan Eiland

Tyler Bates chronology
Guardians of the Galaxy (2014)	John Wick (2014)	The Belko Experiment (2016)

Joel J. Richard chronology
John Wick (2014)	John Wick: Chapter 2 (2017)

John Wick: Original Motion Picture Soundtrack is the original soundtrack album to the 2014 film John Wick starring Keanu Reeves, Michael Nyqvist, Alfie Allen, Adrianne Palicki, Ian McShane, Lance Reddick, Dean Winters, and Willem Dafoe. It contains twenty-seven tracks from the original film score written and composed by Tyler Bates and Joel J. Richard, with songs performed by Ciscandra Nostalghia, The Candy Shop Boys, and M86 & Susie Q, Le Castle Vania, and features violin player Scott Tixier.

== History ==
Having been friends for some time, as well as having and sharing common interests and taste in music, both Bates and Richard have wanted to work together musically for some period of time. Director Chad Stahelski and producer Dave Leitch approached Bates to write the score for John Wick after filming had completed, and it was then that Bates had the thought of working with Richard, explaining, "Joel came to the table with great ideas and a sensibility that was exactly as I felt we should approach the music."

On July 11, 2014, it was officially announced that Bates and Richard had composed the score for the film.

== Development ==
Both Stahelski and Leitch had expressed to both Bates and Richard they wished for the compositions of the film to be in line with John Wick's alter ego and former life, with Richard describing the two as wanting a "fun, raw, aggressive, unorthodox score", as well as the emphasis on the music of the piece being able to create an atmosphere to differentiate between the set pieces and fight sequences of John Wick. For the score of John Wick, Bates explained that the first words of musical direction that came from Stahelski and Leitch was that they wished for a score to "kick ass in the same aesthetic paradigm that IS John Wick's world", the combination of film and musical tonality.

To conceptualize the score both Bates and Richard were of the mind that the suitable approach to tackle such a score would be to "get into the headspace of John Wick" as well as understanding the tone and essence of Wick's story too, as opposed to jumping right into composition straight away without any emotional attachment. Of the opening sequence, Richard stated, "[It] was the first scene tackled. It was originally much longer and contained elements from the end of the film." Le Castle Vania, who are long-time collaborators of Bates and Richard, made their film scoring début by contributing several pieces of original music which was written specifically for various high energy scenes in the film.

== Critical reception ==
Professional ratings
Review scores
Source	Rating
Blue Print Review	4.5/5 stars

Ignatiy Vishnevetsky of The A.V. Club praised the score and Kaleida's "Think", stating, "one of the most effective and eccentric sound track choices in a recent action movie—underscores the sense that what the viewer is watching is essentially a very loud and bloody dance piece."

Erik Avellaneda of Entertainment Voice highly praised the musical score, for which he stated, "The music is a nod to classic rock and modern techno. This heightens the film’s mystical, playful nature and only strengthens the action of the film." Joe Robberson of Zimbo hails the piece as "further [pushing] the wicked mood of the film" as well as being "electric and makes the film crackle with energy". He too praised the score for its diversity and lack of Hans Zimmer-esque pulses. Steve Persall of Tampa Bay Times described the piece as a "neo-Giorgio Moroder synth-rock musical score".

Peter Debruge of Variety acknowledged the importance of cinematography and its "relying on a mix of heavy metal and electronic music from the likes of Marilyn Manson, Tyler Bates and Kaleida to generate propulsive forward energy." Paloma Sharma of Rediff wrote of Bates' and Richard's score, "[Bates] and [Richards'] soundtrack makes sure that you understand two things throughout the film: [Wick] is armed, angry and dangerous and [Wick] is the coolest hitman you've seen in a while."

Robert Abele of The Los Angeles Times described the score as a "growling rock soundtrack".

Chris Sawin of Examiner.com highlights the music in the piece as a "bass-heavy soundtrack", as well as adding to it further by stating, "The dance-fueled soundtrack is an excellent companion to the film and is the ideal sidekick to the film's outstanding action." Neil Miller of Film School Rejects described the score as, "[a] pulsing score from Tyler Bates." Jeff Bulmer of The Phoenix News professed of the score, "Tyler Bates’ music complements every scene the way a soundtrack should, even becoming a character of its own at points."

Sutton Bradbury-Koster of The Massachusetts Daily Collegian spoke most highly of the score stating, "The music does all the talking – blending soothing strings with ambient synths to generate a raw, emotional atmosphere that seems nearly misplaced given the movie it resides in. While this atmospheric and emotional presence does not remain throughout much else of the film, it is still worth mentioning." and further expands by expressing, "The rest of the film’s score features a pulsating, intense low-drive bass drumbeat that establishes a tense yet epic feeling."

Editors of MSN heralded the soundtrack by stating, "it's the crunching original score by Marilyn Manson guitarist Tyler Bates and the co-directors' refusal to embrace the post-Bourne Identity shaky-cam action trend that makes John Wick feel like a film from an alternate cinematic universe."

== Track listing ==
All music is composed by Tyler Bates and Joel J. Richard, except where noted.

No.	Title	Writer(s)	Length
1.	"Every Ending Has a Beginning"		1:31
2.	"Story of Wick"		3:05
3.	"John Mourns"		2:29
4.	"Assassins"		2:12
5.	"Dear John"		1:49
6.	"Daisy"		1:29
7.	"Evil Man Blues" (Performed by The Candy Shop Boys: Sophia Urista, Scott Tixier, Jesse Elder, Kenball Zwerin, Arthur Vint, Matt Parker)	Leonard Feather and Lionel Hampton	4:20
8.	"The Red Circle"	Le Castle Vania	1:00
9.	"Lure the Wolf"		2:04
10.	"Iosef the Terrible"		2:34
11.	"Chop Shop"		2:52
12.	"Baba Yaga"		1:46
13.	"On The Hunt"		2:11
14.	"In My Mind" (Performed by M86 & Susie Q)	Ali Theodore, Susan Paroff, Sergio Cabral, Sarai Howard, Bryan Spitzer	3:07
15.	"The Drowning"	Le Castle Vania	2:24
16.	"Think" (Performed by Kaleida)	Kaleida	3:59
17.	"LED Spirals"	Le Castle Vania	0:59
18.	"Shots Fired"	Le Castle Vania	3:11
19.	"Old Friend Marcus"		1:33
20.	"Hotel Throw Down"		2:55
21.	"Warehouse Smack Down"		2:44
22.	"Who You Talkin' To Man?" (Performed by Ciscandra Nostalghia)	Ciscandra Nostalghia and Tyler Bates	4:41
23.	"Membership Revoked"		2:04
24.	"Unfortunate Priest"		1:49
25.	"Dock Shootout"		2:42
26.	"No More Guns"		2:05
27.	"Be Seeing You"		3:38
Total length:			62:33

=== Additional tracks ===
Unreleased tracks
No.	Title	Writer(s)	Length
1.	"Get Money" (Performed by T-Bo featuring Bengie B)	Jason Paul Thibeau, Roy Whitney Anthony and Benjamin Smith
2.	"Hunid One's" (Performed by T-Bo)	Jason Paul Thibeau and Michael Gniewkowski
3.	"Russian Lullaby"	David Bawiec and Vadim Suslov
4.	"Killing Strangers" (Performed by Marilyn Manson and Tyler Bates)	Marilyn Manson and Tyler Bates

== Personnel credits ==
Credits for John Wick adapted from CD reverse notes.

All music composed by Tyler Bates and Joel J. Richard.

- Score Produced: Tyler Bates, Joel J. Richard and Dylan Eiland
- Additional Music: Le Castle Vania
- Composer & Producer: Cicely Goulder
- Executive Producer: Robert Townson
- Executive Producer: Darren Blumenthal
- Executive Producer: Tara Moross
- Composer: Leonard Feather
- Composer: Lionel Hampton
- Composer: Sarai Howard
- Composer: Susan Paroff
- Composer: Bryan Spitzer
- Composer: Ali Theodore
- Composer: Christina Wood
- Composer: Sergio Cabral
- Music Supervisor: John Houlihan
- Mastering: Patricia Sullivan Fourstar
- Score Mixed By: Wolfgang Matthes
- Music Preparation: Joanne Higginbottom
- Music Editor: Brian Richards
- Temp Music Editor: Nevin Seus
- Assistant Music Editor: Roger Kosteck
- Music Business & Legal Executive: Charles M. Barsamian
- Music Licensing: Paul McPherson
- Drums Recorded: Robert Carranza

Featured musicians

- Song Performer: T-Bo
- Song Performer and Song: Marilyn Manson
- Bass, Guitar, Keyboards, Primary Artist, and Song: Tyler Bates
- Balalaika, Bass, Guitar, Hand Percussion, and Keyboards: Joel J. Richard
- Group: The Candy Shop Boys
- Group: Ciscandra Nostalghia
- Group: Kaleida
- Group: M86
- Song: Leonard Feather
- Song: Lionel Hampton
- Song: Sarai Howard
- Song: Bryan Spitzer
- Song: Ali Theodore
- Keyboards: Wolfgang Matthes
- Violin: Scott Tixier
- Drums: Gil Sharone
- Singer: Sophia Urista
