= Le Castle Vania =

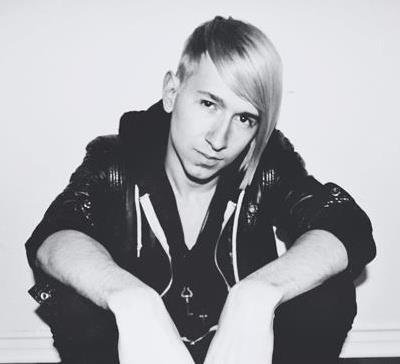

Background information
- Birth name: Dylan Eiland
- Also known as: DJ Dylan
- Origin: Atlanta, Georgia, United States
- Genres: Electronica, alternative dance, electronic rock
- Years active: 2006–present
- Labels: Always-Never Records; So Sweet Records; Mau5trap
- Website: lecastlevania.com

Le Castle Vania is an American electronic dance music project created by Atlanta-based DJ Dylan Eiland.

== Background ==
Eiland began DJing at warehouse parties and raves in Atlanta at age 16. He adopted the name "Le Castle Vania" with the release of his remix for Snowden's song "Black Eyes" in 2006. From 2007 to 2012, Le Castle Vania hosted the "Fuck Yesss" indie electronica dance parties at venues such as The Drunken Unicorn and Masquerade in Atlanta.

Eiland uses a simple setup, including a laptop computer, a mixer, and two turntables. He writes his songs on his laptop, often while traveling on airplanes, and prefers to play a larger number of his original work compared to his remixes. At one point, his remix of Black Eyes by Snowden was the most requested song at a New Zealand radio station. He has also remixed songs by Daft Punk, Kaskade, and Klaxons.

The sound of Le Castle Vania is specifically intended to avoid the common southern influence of crunk, and focuses primarily on Euro-electro influences.

In 2008, URB Magazine included Le Castle Vania in their list of "Next 100" artists to watch.

In 2014, Eiland contributed to the soundtrack of the film John Wick with 4 original songs. He had returned to compose original music for John Wick: Chapter 2 as well as making a cameo appearance as a DJ in the film. In 2023, Eiland returned to the John Wick franchise as a contributor for the soundtrack of its fourth film installment; John Wick: Chapter 4.

On October 21, 2015, Eiland contributed three new songs to the video game Payday 2 as a part of the game's yearly anniversary event, Crimefest, and later contributed two more songs in October 2018 as part of that year's Crimefest, dubbed "Breaking News."

== Related projects ==
Eiland is the founder of Always Never, an electronic music record label and music/nightlife event production company. He is the founder of the Fuck Yesss party held in Atlanta, Georgia.

== Discography - Le Castle Vania ==
- "The Phantom" (featuring Man 3 Faces)
- "Himmel und Hölle" EP (From John Wick: Chapter 4 Original Motion Picture Soundtrack)
- "Blood Flows" (with One True God and Roniit)
- "To The Edge" (with Justcuz and Featuring Akylla)
- "Shut Up And Listen" (with LUMBERJVCK)
- "Waiting For You" (with HIGHSOCIETY)
- "The Journey" (with SKUM)
- "Bad Company" (with One True God)
- "Keep Breathing"
- "Confirmed Thrills" (from the game Payday 2)
- "Solaris Rerez" (from the game Solaris Offworld Combat)
- "D.O.A"
- "After Image" (featuring Mariana Bell)
- "Pray For My Enemies" (with Hyper)
- "Operation Black Light" (from the game Payday 2)
- "Komputer Problems" (with Gigantor)
- "Freak"
- "The Otherside"
- "Tape Blaster" (with Addison)
- "Payday" EP (from the game Payday 2)
- "I Want You / What We Do" (with Addison)
- "You Know My Name" EP (with LUMBERJVCK)
- "Feels Like Fire" EP
- "LED Spirals" (Extended Version) (From John Wick (soundtrack))
- "Prophication Remixes" EP
- "Prophication" EP
- "Play Loud"
- "The Light"
- "Awake Remixes" EP
- "Awake"
- "Nobody Gets Out Alive Remixes" EP
- "Nobody Gets Out Alive"
- "Troubletron Remixes"
- "Troubletron"
- John Wick: Original Motion Picture Soundtrack (contributor)
- John Wick: Chapter 2 (Original Motion Picture Soundtrack) (contributor)

== Remixes - Le Castle Vania ==
- Walter Meego - "Through A Keyhole" (Le Castle Vania Remix Part 2)
- Vitalic - "Stamina" (Le Castle Vania Remix)
- John Lord Fonda - "Sound Of Melody" (Le Castle Vania Remix)
- Mad Owl - "Glacier" (Le Castle Vania Remix)
- Split & Jaxta - "Roulette" (Le Castle Vania Remix)
- Kaskade - "Turn It Down" (Le Castle Vania Remix)
- Stereoheroes - "Wild Child" (Le Castle Vania Remix)
- DJ Falcon + Thomas Bangalter - "Together" (Le Castle Vania + Computer Club Remix)
- D.I.M - "Is You" (Le Castle Vania Remix)
- Rrrump - "Chubby Decker" (Le Castle Vania + Street Lurkin Remix)
- CeeLo Green - "F*ck You" (Le Castle Vania Remix)
- Dieselboy - "NVD" (Le Castle Vania + Computer Club)
- La Roux - "In For The Kill" (Le Castle Vania Remix)
- The Virgins - "Rich Girls" (Le Castle Vania's Spring Break No Parents Remix)
- Designer Drugs - "Back Up In This" (Le Castle Vania + Rrrump + Computer Club Remix)
- Fukkk Offf - "Rave is King" (Le Castle Vania Remix)
- Walter Meego - "Through A Keyhole" (Le Castle Vania Remix)
- Le Castle Vania - "Zero Machine" (Unofficial rework of the song "Zero" by Smashing Pumpkins)
- Le Castle Vania + Computer Club – "The Messiah" (Unofficial rework of the song "Messiah" by Konflict)
- Grum - "Go Back" (Le Castle Vania Remix)
- Kill The Noise - "Hey You" (Le Castle Vania Remix)
- Scanners - "Bombs" (Le Castle Vania Remix)
- 120 Days - "Come Out" (Le Castle Vania Remixes)
- Snowden - "Black Eyes" (Le Castle Vania Remix)

== Discography - Lies In Disguise ==
- "Lies In Disguise - Meet Your Replacement"
- "Shinichi Osawa - Electro411 (Lies In Disguise Remix)"
- "Toxic Avenger - Poker Face (Lies In Disguise Remix)"
- "Party Shank - Penis Vs Vagina (Lies In Disguise Remix)"
