= NowPublic =

Canadian news website

- Website type: Citizen journalism
- Owner: NowPublic Technologies Inc.
- Creators: Michael Tippett, Leonard Brody and Michael E. Meyers
- Commercial: Yes
- Registration: Optional
- Launched: 2005
- Current status: Inactive (as of 2013)

NowPublic was a user-generated social news website. The company was based in Vancouver, British Columbia, Canada, and was founded by Michael Tippett, Leonard Brody and Michael E. Meyers in 2005. On September 2, 2009 the company was acquired by Clarity Digital Group, LLC, wholly owned by The Anschutz Company, a Denver-based investment company.

Effective December 27, 2013 the site was closed and the domain redirected to www.examiner.com.

In addition to content contributed by users, NowPublic had a content-sharing agreement with the Associated Press.

Time magazine named NowPublic.com one of the Top 50 websites of 2007. In 2009, the site was nominated for an Emmy in Advanced Technology.

== Financing ==
On July 30, 2007, a Canadian national daily, The Globe and Mail, announced that NowPublic Technologies had closed a US$10.6 million round of financing from North American venture capital groups, following several takeover offers. These investors include New York's Rho Ventures and its Montreal affiliate and early investing Canadian firms Brightspark and Growthworks.

== See also ==
- Citizen journalism
- Crowdsourcing
- National Observer (Canada)
