= Kate Armstrong (artist) =

Canadian artist, writer and curator

- Born: 1971, 27 September 1971
- Education: Queen's University at Kingston, Memorial University of Newfoundland
- Occupations: Curator, writer, artist
- Notable work: Grafik Dynamo
- Website: www.katearmstrong.com

Kate Armstrong is a Canadian artist, writer and curator with a history of projects focusing on experimental literary practices, networks and public space.

== Biography ==
Armstrong is a Canadian artist, writer, and curator. She holds a Bachelor of Arts degree from Queen's University in Kingston, Ontario. She received a master of philosophy in humanities degree from Memorial University in St. John's, Newfoundland. After gaining her master's degree from Memorial University in her early twenties, she began her current career path in the arts. The main focus of her work is to explore the relationship between art and technology.

Armstrong was born in Calgary and lived in New York, Glasgow and Japan, later moving to Vancouver, British Columbia. She resides in Vancouver. She is married to Michael Tippett and has 2 children.

== Career ==
She founded Upgrade Vancouver in 2003 and has produced over 100 events in the field of art and technology in Vancouver, British Columbia, as well as many international events and exhibitions in connection with Upgrade International, a network operating in 30 cities worldwide.

In 2008, Armstrong commissioned and curated Tributaries and Text-Fed Streams, a work by J.R. Carpenter, which investigated the formal properties of RSS syndication as a literary form.

From 2005 to 2008, she taught at Simon Fraser University in the School of Interactive Arts and Technology in Surrey, British Columbia. She lectured at Tate Britain in mid-2009.

== Projects ==
- Medium (2011) – Book compiling the results of an internet project of the same name
- Path (2008) – 12 volume text generated book based on the physical movements of an anonymous individual in Montreal. An updated edition was released in 2012
- Grafik Dynamo (2005–2008) – Net artwork that converted images from the internet into live-action comic strips from 2005 to 2008. Commissioned by Turbulence.org. Reviewed in Digital Humanities. Quarterly and Leonardo.
- PING (2003) – Telephone menu system that directs participants through the city. Reviewed in Beyond the Screen, 2010

== Publications and essays ==
- Chapter 28. A Collective Imaginary: A Published Conversation, with Kate Armstrong Electronic Literature as Digital Humanities: Contexts, Forms, and Practices
- A Manual for the Discrete and the Continuous, Fillip, Issue 11 (2010)
- Visual Geographies, Blackflash Magazine (2010)
- Yo Dawg, I Hear You Like Culture So I Put Some Culture in Your Culture, Granville Magazine (2009)
- Robots in the Garden, Catalogue essay, Second Site Collective (2009)
- Data and Narrative: Location Aware Fiction, trAce Online Writing Centre, (2003)
- Crisis & Repetition: Essays on Art and Culture,(2002)

== See also ==
- List of electronic literature authors, critics, and works
- Digital poetry
- Electronic literature
- Hypertext fiction
