= John Wick (film) =

2014 American film directed by Chad Stahelski

- Theatrical release poster
- Directed by: Chad Stahelski (Note: Chad Stahelski and David Leitch co-directed John Wick, but the Directors Guild of America awarded sole directorial credit to Stahelski; Leitch is instead listed as a producer.)
- Written by: Derek Kolstad
- Produced by: Basil Iwanyk; David Leitch; Eva Longoria; Michael Witherill
- Starring: Keanu Reeves; Michael Nyqvist; Alfie Allen; Adrianne Palicki; Bridget Moynahan; Dean Winters; Ian McShane; John Leguizamo; Willem Dafoe
- Cinematography: Jonathan Sela
- Edited by: Elísabet Ronaldsdóttir
- Music by: Tyler Bates; Joel J. Richard
- Production companies: Thunder Road Pictures; 87Eleven Productions; MJW Films; DefyNite Films
- Distributed by: Summit Entertainment
- Release date: October 24, 2014
- Running time: 101 minutes
- Country: United States
- Language: English
- Budget: $20–30 million
- Box office: $86 million

John Wick is a 2014 American action thriller film directed by Chad Stahelski and written by Derek Kolstad. Keanu Reeves stars as John Wick, a legendary hitman who comes out of retirement to seek revenge against the men who killed his dog, a final gift from his recently deceased wife. The film also stars Michael Nyqvist, Alfie Allen, Adrianne Palicki, Bridget Moynahan, Dean Winters, Ian McShane, John Leguizamo, and Willem Dafoe.

Kolstad's script drew on his interest in action, revenge, and neo noir films. The producer Basil Iwanyk purchased the rights for his first independent film production. Reeves, whose career was declining, liked the script and recommended that the experienced stunt choreographers Stahelski and David Leitch direct the action scenes; Stahelski and Leitch successfully lobbied to co-direct the project. Principal photography began in October 2013, on a $20–$30 million budget, and concluded that December. Stahelski and Leitch focused on long, highly choreographed single takes to convey action, eschewing the rapid cuts and close-up shots of contemporary action films.

Iwanyk struggled to secure theatrical distributors because industry executives were dismissive of an action film by first-time directors, and Reeves's recent films had financially underperformed. Lionsgate Films purchased the distribution rights to the film two months before its release date on October 24, 2014. Following a successful marketing campaign that changed its perception from disposable entertainment to a prestige event helmed by an affable leading actor, John Wick became a surprise box office success, grossing $86 million worldwide. It received generally positive reviews for its style and its action sequences. Critics hailed John Wick as a comeback for Reeves, in a role that played to his acting strengths. The film's mythology of a criminal underworld with rituals and rules was praised as its most distinctive and interesting feature.

John Wick began a successful franchise which includes three sequels, John Wick: Chapter 2 (2017), John Wick: Chapter 3 – Parabellum (2019), and John Wick: Chapter 4 (2023), the prequel television series The Continental (2023), and the spin-off film Ballerina (2025), as well as video games and comic books. It is seen as having revitalized the action genre and popularized long single takes with choreographed, detailed action.

== Plot ==
In New York City, John Wick is grieving the death of his wife Helen, who had arranged for him to receive a beagle puppy, Daisy, to help cope with his loss. A few days later, a group of Russian gangsters led by Iosef Tarasov accost John at a gas station and fail to intimidate him into selling them his 1969 Boss 429 Mustang. (Note: John Wick's car is identified in the film as a 1969 Boss 429 Mustang but is portrayed by a 1969 Ford Mustang Mach 1.) That night, they break into John's home, attack him, kill the puppy, and steal the car. Iosef takes the Mustang to a chop shop to remove its identifying details, but the shop owner, Aurelio, recognizes it and refuses service. Aurelio informs John that Iosef is the son of Viggo Tarasov, the boss of New York City's Russian Mafia.

Upon learning of his son's actions, Viggo berates Iosef for incurring John's wrath. He reveals John was once a hitman in his employ, and was renowned and feared in the criminal underworld as the "Baba Yaga", a ruthless, relentless "man of focus, commitment, and sheer will". After John fell in love with Helen, a civilian, Viggo gave him a seemingly impossible task to earn his freedom; he succeeded.

John recovers a concealed stash from his former career that includes weapons and gold coins. He rejects Viggo's attempt to make amends and kills the hit squad subsequently sent to his home. Viggo puts a $2 million bounty on John and enlists John's former mentor, Marcus, to kill him. John lodges at the Continental, a luxurious hotel that serves as neutral ground for the underworld and where conducting criminal business is strictly forbidden. Winston, the hotel's owner and John's old friend, informs him that Iosef is at a nightclub called Red Circle. John infiltrates Red Circle and confronts Iosef, but he is attacked by Viggo's henchman Kirill and forced to retreat to the Continental for medical attention.

As John rests, a hitwoman, Ms. Perkins, sneaks into his room. Marcus sees Perkins from an adjacent building and fires a warning shot to alert John, who wakes up and subdues her. Perkins reveals that Viggo has doubled the bounty for her to kill John in the hotel and has concealed a high-value stash in a church. John hires another hitman, Harry, to secure Perkins, but she kills Harry and escapes.

At the church, John destroys Viggo's cache of cash and extensive blackmail material. When Viggo arrives to assess the damage, John assaults him and his men but is hit by Kirill's car and captured. John tells Viggo he will not stop until Iosef is dead because the puppy gave him hope and a chance to not be alone in his grief for Helen. Marcus again intervenes to save John, who kills Kirill and threatens Viggo into revealing Iosef's location in a safe house. John attacks the safehouse and kills Iosef. Marcus encourages John to return to his everyday life. Perkins witnesses this and reveals Marcus's duplicity to Viggo, who has him tortured and killed. Viggo calls John to taunt him with the details, drawing him back to the city.

Winston has Perkins executed for breaking the Continental's rules, then informs John that Viggo is preparing to leave the city by helicopter. John races to New York Harbor, where he fights and mortally wounds Viggo. John, resigned to dying from his injuries, watches a video on his phone of Helen telling him they need to go home. He breaks into a nearby animal clinic, treats his wounds, and adopts a pit bull puppy scheduled to be euthanized before beginning to walk home.

== Cast ==
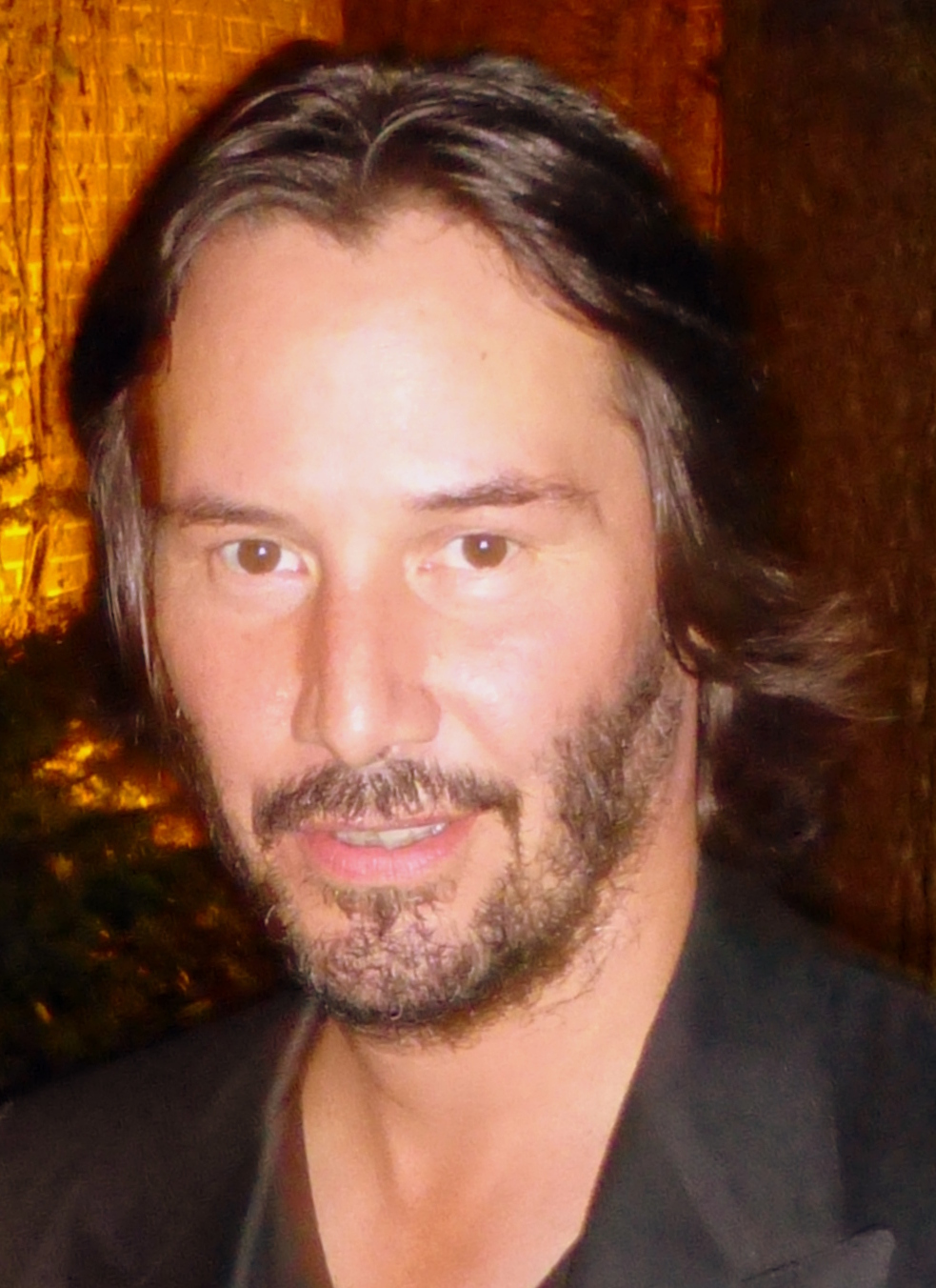
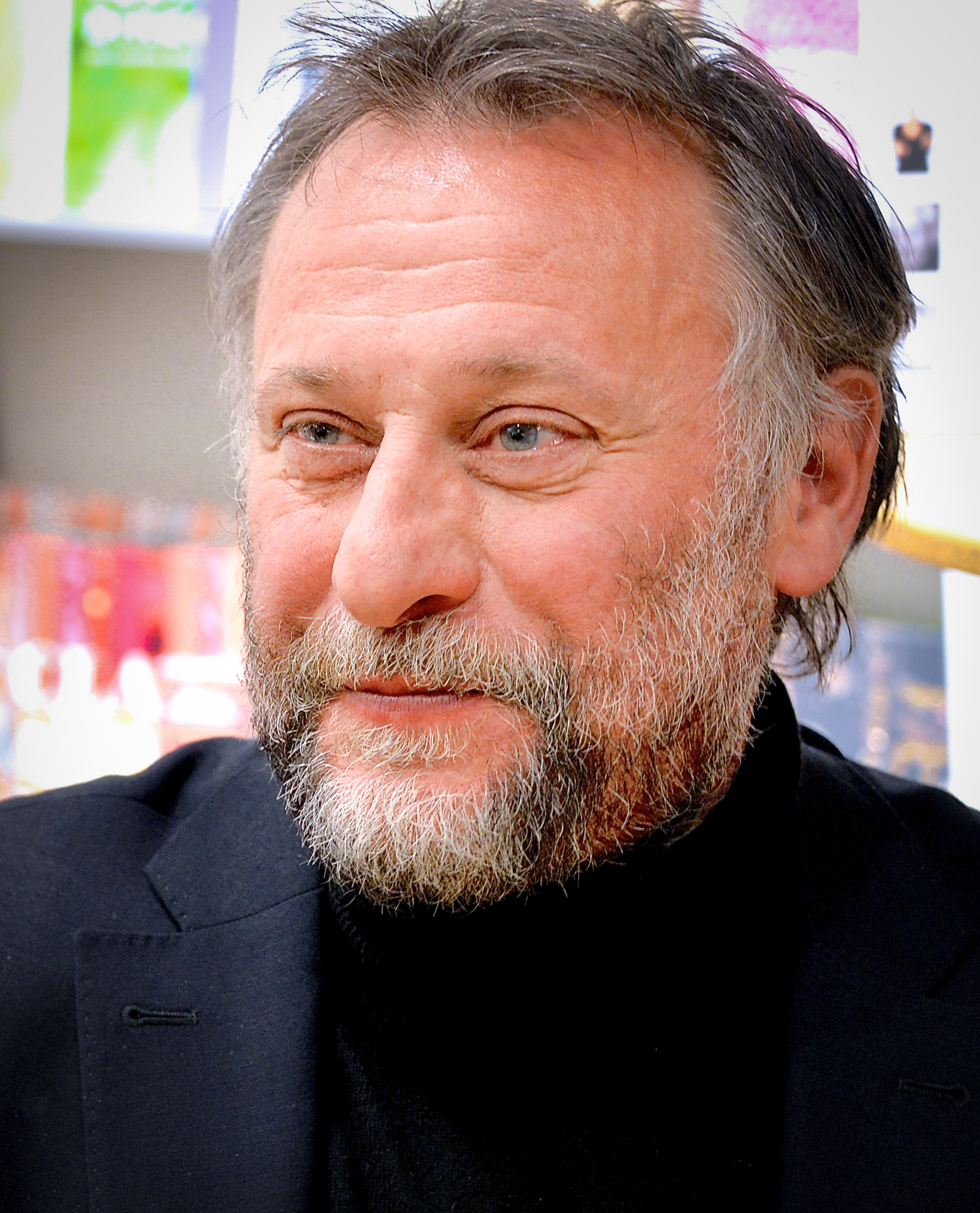
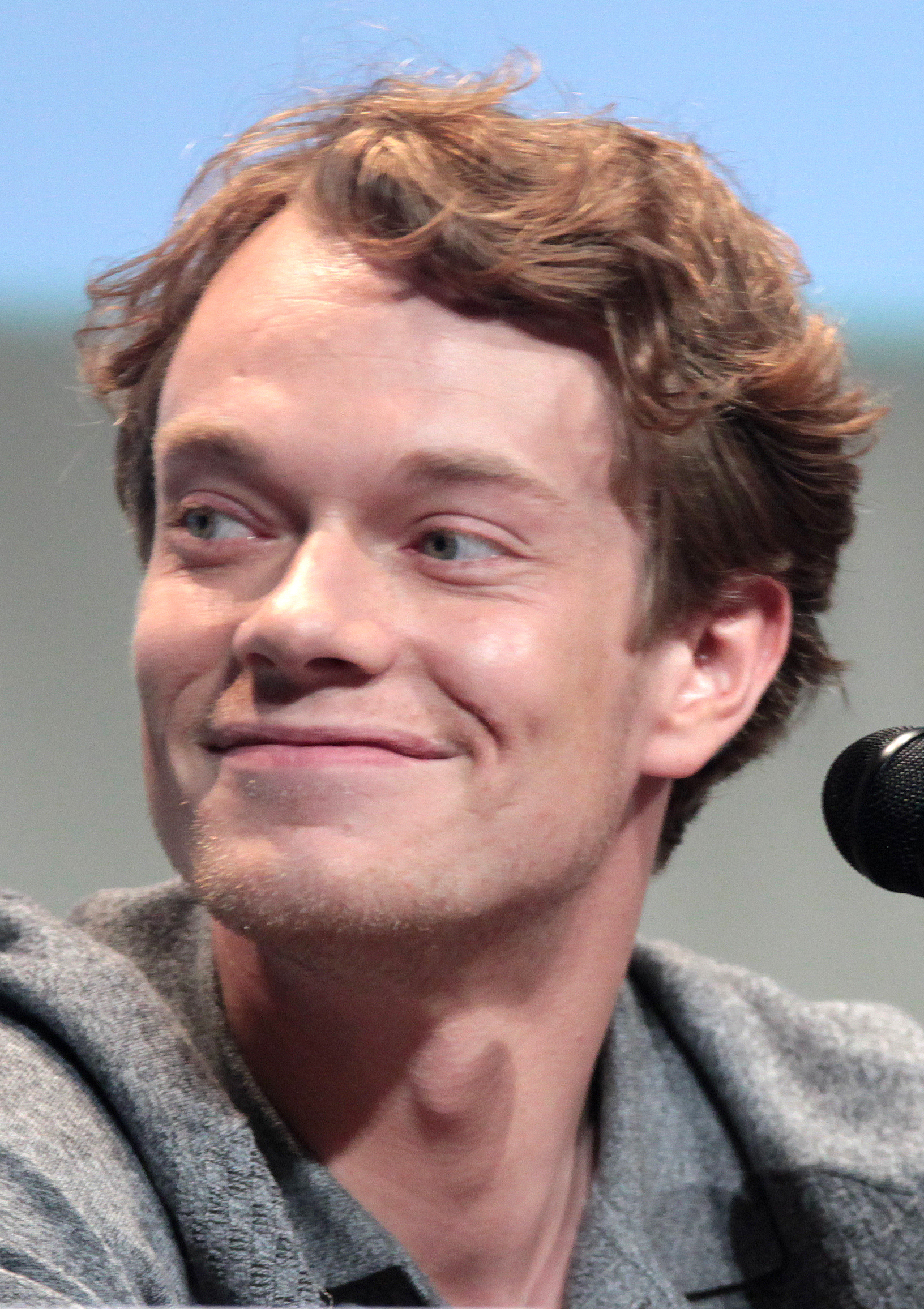
Keanu Reeves, Michael Nyqvist (both pictured in 2013), and Alfie Allen (2015)
- Keanu Reeves as John Wick: A retired hitman who is legendary in the criminal underworld
- Michael Nyqvist as Viggo Tarasov: A vicious Russian crime boss and John's former employer
- Alfie Allen as Iosef Tarasov: Viggo's reckless and arrogant son
- Adrianne Palicki as Ms. Perkins: A ruthless and highly skilled hitwoman
- Bridget Moynahan as Helen: John's beloved and devoted wife
- Dean Winters as Avi: Viggo's attorney
- Lance Reddick as Charon / Hotel Manager: The Continental's concierge
- Toby Leonard Moore as Victor: A Russian gangster working with Iosef
- Ian McShane as Winston: The enigmatic owner of the Continental
- John Leguizamo as Aurelio: A mechanic who owns a high-end chop shop
- Willem Dafoe as Marcus: A skilled sniper and John's old friend

The cast also includes Omer Barnea as Gregori, Iosef's underling who kills John's dog; Daniel Bernhardt as Kirill, a former Russian military commander-turned-henchman for Viggo; Thomas Sadoski as Jimmy, a police officer; and David Patrick Kelly as Charlie, a cleaner who destroys criminal evidence, including bodies. The Continental staff includes Bridget Regan as Addy, a bartender fond of John, and Randall Duk Kim as a hotel doctor. Clarke Peters portrays Harry, a hitman; Kevin Nash appears as Francis, a bouncer at the Red Circle night club; and Munro M. Bonnell plays a corrupt priest protecting Viggo's vault beneath a church. A beagle puppy called Andy portrays John's dog, Daisy.

== Production ==
=== Writing ===
During the early 2000s, Derek Kolstad struggled to gain recognition as a screenwriter, completing up to eight screenplays per year, none of which went into production. Although he continued to write, he stopped pursuing it as a full-time career until his wife encouraged him to try again. Kolstad secured a manager and wrote 60 screenplays before finding success with the low-budget action films One in the Chamber (2012) and The Package (2013). Over four days in either 2012 or 2013, Kolstad wrote a spec script titled Scorn, the inspiration for which came from two "terrible revenge movies" he had watched. The script's story centered around the character John Wick, a long-retired hitman in his mid-60s to mid-70s who is forced back into his former life. John was modeled on actors such as Clint Eastwood and Paul Newman. The script included elements such as John's long-deceased wife, his elderly dog, the Continental, Charon, Winston, and the underworld gold coins. It also had a kill count of 11 compared to the film's several dozen. John was portrayed as an underworld legend who had been absent for decades, causing younger criminals to dismiss tales of his deeds. Kolstad aimed to explore the character as "the worst man in existence" who finds and loses salvation through love and events that follow. Kolstad had difficulty determining the incident that would lead to John's return, ultimately choosing his dog's murder over the cliché of the killing of the protagonist's wife and family. Kolstad focused his efforts on the first act, believing a solid opening would make later acts easier to write.

The draft was influenced by the variety of action films Kolstad appreciated, including Aliens (1986), Predator (1987), and Die Hard (1988), as well as revenge films, westerns, and neo-noir films such as Miller's Crossing (1990). (Note: Attributed to multiple references:) Kolstad included black comedy because he found that levity added to the characters' humanity, drawing influence from silent comedy actors such as Buster Keaton, Harold Lloyd, Charlie Chaplin, and Roscoe Arbuckle; and his favorite animated television series, including Rick and Morty and SpongeBob SquarePants. After garnering feedback from family and agents, Kolstad made minor changes and the spec script was put out for sale.

=== Development ===
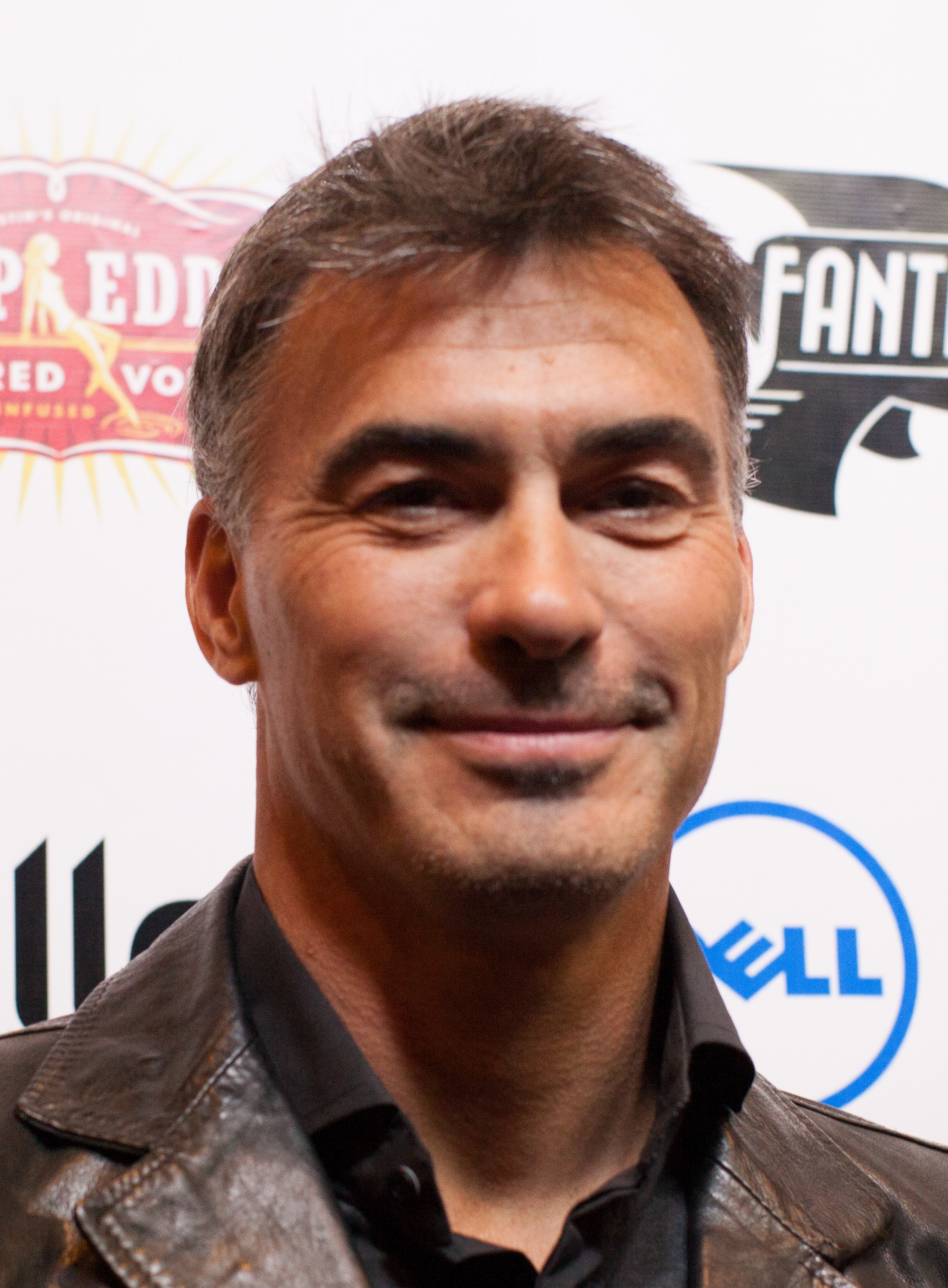
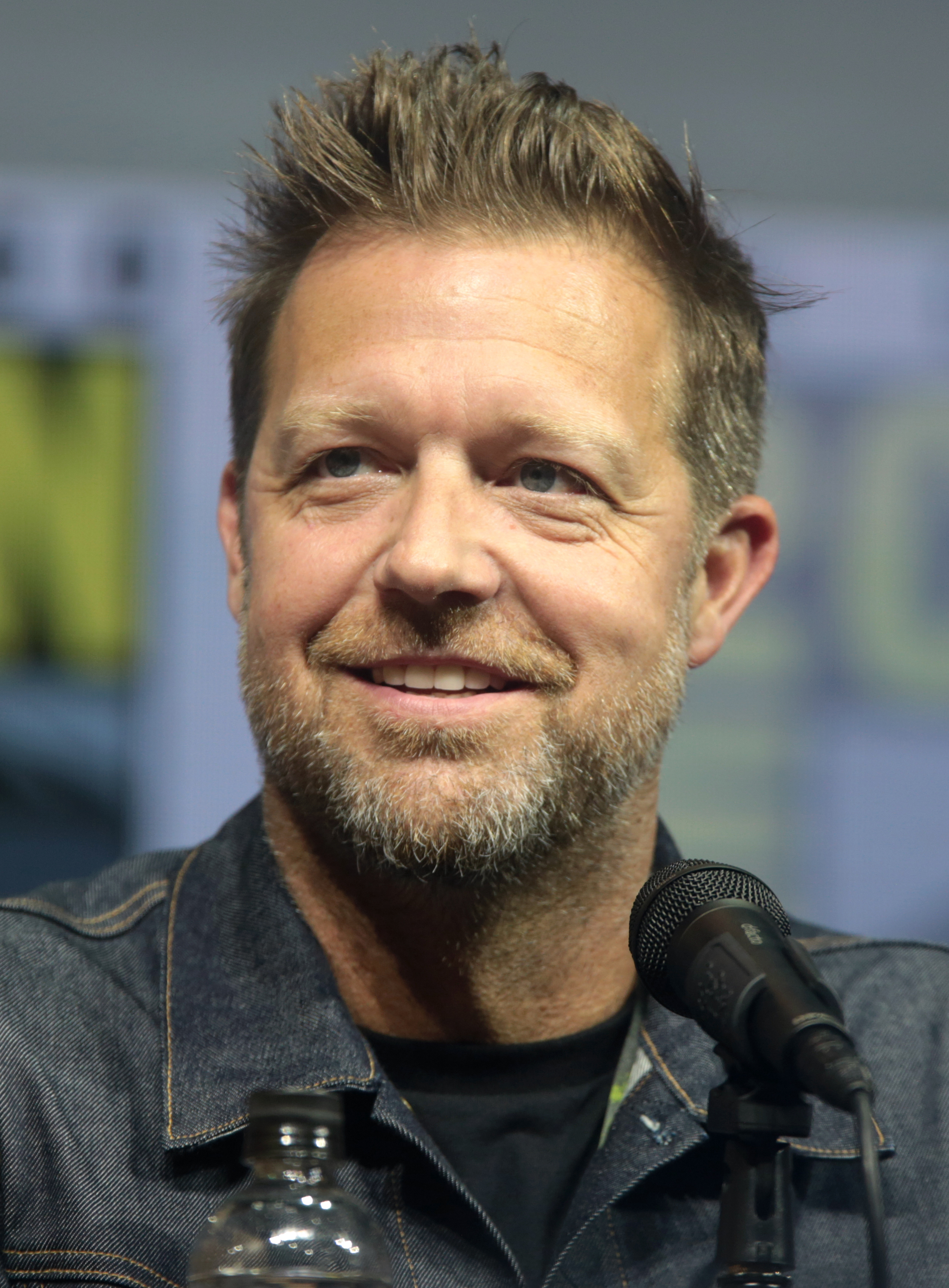
Chad Stahelski (pictured in 2014) and David Leitch (2018)

At the same time, film producer Basil Iwanyk was developing films for Warner Bros. Pictures through his studio Thunder Road Films. Iwanyk was frustrated at not being involved beyond sourcing scripts; he wanted the autonomy to develop independent films so he could be more involved in the process. He focused on action films that could be made on relatively low budgets. Iwanyk read Kolstad's spec script, appreciating its subversive tone and emotional throughline, as well as the relatability and accessibility of a man seeking revenge after losing his wife, his dog, and his car, and after his home is violated.

Kolstad received multiple offers for the script, but his agent advised him to consider the lowest bid from Iwanyk because Thunder Road Films was ready to start work immediately. The deal was completed in February 2013. Kolstad began rewrites alongside Iwanyk and the producer Erica Lee over two months. Iwanyk originally envisioned older actors such as Eastwood (then 83 years old) or Harrison Ford (then 71) as John but later decided against focusing solely on an actor's age. Bruce Willis was attached to portray John at this stage.

In April 2013, Iwanyk's friend was serving as Keanu Reeves's talent agent. Iwanyk shared the script after the agent expressed Reeves's interest in pursuing a new action project. Reeves was interested in the dynamics between the real world and the underworld, and the emotional connection to John's wife. The script was sent to multiple directors, many of whom suggested expanding John's family and having them killed to drive the plot, but Kolstad opposed this idea. Others were uninterested because the idea appeared to be a typical Reeves action film.

While Reeves was negotiating his involvement, he sent the script to Chad Stahelski and David Leitch, both of whom had worked with him as stunt coordinators and performers on the first three films in The Matrix franchise and later projects, and had founded the action, design, and stunt company 87Eleven Productions. (Note: Attributed to multiple references:) He recommended them to choreograph or direct the action sequences, feeling their style matched the script's tone. Stahelski and Leitch were interested in the variety of action scenes, but they wanted to direct the film itself. Stahelski and Leitch gained Reeves's support after pitching him their vision of an assassin thriller with a realistic tone in an otherworldly setting, in which John was an urban legend. (Note: Attributed to multiple references:) Reeves said they impressed him with their intent to make each character memorable and thoughts on the theme of living a double life. In May, Reeves was confirmed for the lead role, and Stahelski and Leitch were to direct it.

For the next two months, Kolstad and Reeves spent weekends rewriting the script six times to fit Reeves's acting style. John was made younger, and Reeves, then 49, intended to portray him as 35. Dialogue was trimmed to emphasize John's slick and tough persona; a five-page conversation between John and the priest was trimmed to John simply responding "Uh-huh". They decided not to depict the impossible task that earned John his freedom, believing they should never show his life before Helen's death.

=== Casting ===
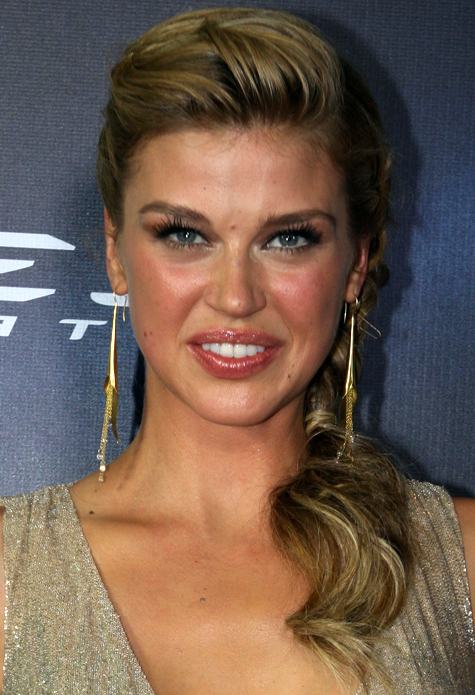
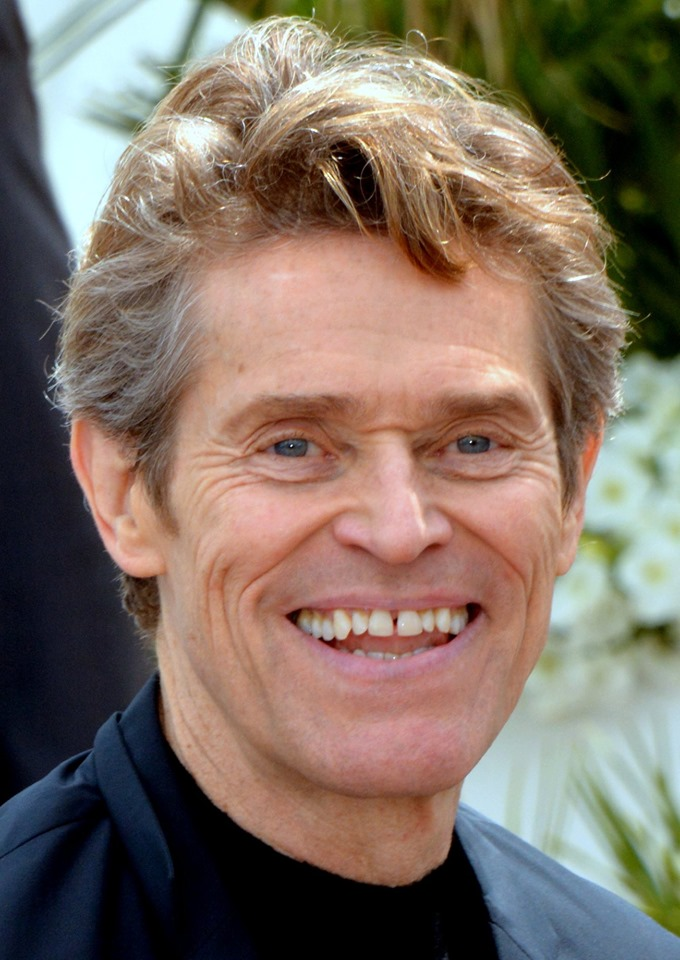
Adrianne Palicki (pictured in 2013) and Willem Dafoe (2019)

John Wick's principal characters were cast in September and October 2013. (Note: Attributed to multiple references:) Casting focused on affordable actors who were available in the two and a half weeks before filming began. The task was eased by filming in New York City, allowing the producers to secure local actors such as Ian McShane, who only had to be present to film their scenes without traveling long distances. Character actors who could vivify Kolstad's characters were preferred; despite little screentime, they were considered essential for providing details about John Wick's past and the underworld.

Kolstad named John Wick after his grandfather, and Helen was named for his grandmother. Reeves was paid $1–$2 million for his performance. Reeves's personal experience with bereavement, having lost his daughter in 1998 and his partner in 2001, helped him relate to John's emotional state. Describing the character, Reeves said:

"[John] thought [his old life] was something he would never go back to ... John thought he was stronger than he is, when really he'd been drawing that strength from his wife, Helen ... I always thought of it as being a kind of Old Testament revenge story. When someone takes the things he cherishes, violence erupts, and John can't temper it."

Stahelski and Leitch prioritized themes of loss and humanity as fundamental aspects of John, wanting to avoid making him a cliché "badass" assassin. They had Reeves grow his hair and beard, and dressed him in stylish suits to create recognizable visual elements. Reeves underwent four months of training, including several hours per day in a gym, strict diet, and stretches, and learned choreography. (Note: Attributed to multiple references:) Despite his previous martial arts experience, the directors aimed to craft a unique style fitting for John, and had Reeves train in judo, Japanese jujutsu, Brazilian jiu-jitsu, and arnis, as well as undergoing tactical-gun training with the Los Angeles SWAT and Navy SEALs. (Note: Attributed to multiple references:) He also learned stunt driving skills, including how to drift a car while aiming a gun.

Michael Nyqvist described the relationship between Viggo and John as akin to a father and son, built on love and respect for John's prowess as an assassin. Nyqvist trained in the Russian martial art sambo, reflecting the character's impoverished street-brawler origins, and partly based his performance on his Russian trainers. He generally played his character straight with some eccentricities. Kolstad described Alfie Allen's Iosef as a less impressive version of his father, depicting a wealthy and spoiled youth who perceives himself as tough but lacks his father's strength. Allen, attracted to the challenge of speaking different languages and accents, immersed himself in Russian bathhouses in New York to refine his dialect. He faced difficulties, including the physical demands his character endured and the spontaneous additions of Russian dialogue to the script, requiring quick adaptation.

The character Ms. Perkins was originally conceived as a male figure until Adrianne Palicki was cast in the role. Palicki characterized the role as a cold, cunning, and ruthless assassin who derives pleasure from killing. Palicki trained in judo and jujitsu for a few months, and spent two weeks learning the choreography for her fight scene with Reeves. (Note: Attributed to multiple references:) Bridget Moynahan, who portrayed John's wife Helen, chose not to read the script in its entirety. Her decision was based on the desire to understand only as much about John as Helen would know, contributing to a more authentic portrayal of her character.

Kolstad depicted Ian McShane's Winston as a character who speaks sparingly but commands attention when he does, likening him to a titan in the realm of New York. McShane accepted the role based on his affinity for neo-noir films. John Leguizamo, in his portrayal of Aurelio, drew inspiration from the character's stylish wardrobe, embodying a sense of confidence and swagger. Leguizamo explained, "I'm walking through the set and all of a sudden I start feeling a little cocky, like I'm somebody." Willem Dafoe described Marcus as a high-level assassin and father figure to John. He added traits to his aging character, such as a scene in which Marcus makes juice because he reasoned the character would maintain his health to stay competitive with younger assassins.

=== Pre-production ===
Financial issues beset the production before and during filming; Iwanyk had limited assets compared to the major studios, and he considered his backers unreliable. He said an investor failed to pay on time and that when he did, "he did things like children do, if he owed us $2.4 million he'd send us a check for $2,400 and go 'whoops! I messed up'". Iwanyk and his executives also lacked experience in film financing. He contemplated cancelling the project five days before the scheduled filming date, but his lawyer advised that he would likely be sued into bankruptcy by those involved and their guilds and unions. Iwanyk twice deferred his own fees to cover costs and lent the costume designer his personal credit card for resources, saying he would at least earn air miles. The lack of financial security delayed filming by two weeks, which Iwanyk described as the most difficult and stressful weeks of his career; his family visited to ensure he was safe because he was not sleeping or eating. When financing was secured, it was less than the originally promised sum. Some principal cast made salary concessions; Reeves put his own money into the project, and Stahelski and Leitch modified scenes to keep the budget low. The majority of funding came from Michael Witherill of MJW Films, the actor Eva Longoria, and DefyNite Films. (Note: Attributed to multiple references:)

New York City was chosen as the main filming location. Although filming there cost millions more than alternatives such as Baton Rouge, Chicago, and Detroit, Iwanyk said "If I shoot [John Wick] with the Brooklyn Bridge in the background, it feels like a big movie". Kolstad considered a city setting in a noir story to be its own character. Budget constraints meant some ideas were abandoned to prioritize financing for the location or departments such as art design and music deemed instrumental to creating the world of John Wick. Stahelski highlighted New York's visual verticality as well as areas like downtown Manhattan, which provided a subterranean atmosphere ideal for creating the mythological underworld setting they envisioned. There were also many restrictions because residents were resistant to mobile trailers used by cast and crew, car chases, and gunfire in their streets. Even on closed streets, the filmmakers had to adhere to speed limits, impacting the execution of car-chase sequences.

=== Design ===
Stahelski and Leitch drew on a broad amalgamation of their favorite films and directors for John Wick's visual style. Stahelski described the crime thriller Point Blank (1967) as a significant influence, as well as the classic visual composition of films from the period 1960–1990, including Le Cercle Rouge (1970) and The Return of the Pink Panther (1975)—a comedy in which hired killers pursue the central character. (Note: Attributed to multiple references:) They also drew on Akira Kurosawa's style of holding on the composition, John Woo's use of wide shots and multi-opponent combat in films such as The Killer (1989), and spaghetti westerns by Sergio Leone. (Note: Attributed to multiple references:) Stahelski referenced Eastwood's enigmatic portrayal in The Good, the Bad and the Ugly (1966), emphasizing the power of unspoken backstories. He explained that they introduced the gold coins without specifying their origin, encouraging the audience to use their imagination to fill in the details. The directors said the value of the gold coins was unimportant, comparing them to business cards that grant access to underworld services and inform the audience they are entering a different world. Further influences were drawn from the works of the director Quentin Tarantino; graphic novels; and action films such as Police Story (1985), Armour of God, Lethal Weapon (both 1987), Die Hard (1988), and The Matrix (1999).

Stahelski and Leitch eschewed the style of rapid cuts showing different angles and close-up shots common in many contemporary action films, which they thought often led to confusing action sequences. They committed to lengthy, single takes with a wide view of the action, reserving cuts only for covering up mistakes. (Note: Attributed to multiple references:) This was also a practical decision—they had only enough budget for a single-camera setup, and no time for elaborate wire stunts and additional coverage footage that could be used in editing to hide mistakes. Iwanyk said if they had an extra $5–$10 million, they could have afforded a multi-camera setup and second-unit filming, but economic restrictions resulted in a better action film. The directors focused on practical stunts but used computer-generated imagery (CGI) when necessary to add gun-muzzle flashes and to complete a stunt in which John is struck by a car.

The settings were intended to be recognizable but distinct, contrasting the private, rural setting of John and Helen—which Leitch described as "organic and warm; very cinéma vérité real"—with the hyper-real underworld where everything is exaggerated. Production designer Dan Leigh emphasized the visual transformation of the underworld, stating that it transcends reality with unique lighting, atmospheric textures, and unexpected elements scattered throughout. Kolstad did not describe the underworld rules and settings in detail, which gave the designers considerable scope. Iwanyk said the lack of detail prevented them from focusing too much on worldbuilding. Luca Mosca led costume design, which focused on stylish suits with some functionality over practical combat outfits to provide a high-class aesthetic to the underworld. Mosca used variant shades of black in the designs and made them form-fitting and sleek to fit the immaculate nature of the underworld. John's suit took inspiration from 1970s-style three-piece suits worn by film stars such as Lee Marvin and Steve McQueen. In the film, John's car is identified as a 1969 Boss 429 Mustang. However, due to the limited production of only 1,359 Boss 429s and the need for five cars for filming, which would all be destroyed, using the authentic model was too expensive. Instead, Ford Mustang Mach 1 models were substituted.

John's combat style was developed for a previous film by supervising stunt coordinator J. J. Perry, along with contributions from Stahelski and 87Eleven Productions associates John Valera, Jon Eusebio, Danny Hernandez, Guillermo Grispo, Eric Brown, the Machado brothers, Jackson Spidell, and armorer Taran Butler. The combat style blends grappling martial arts with gun combat and a focus on restricting limbs with the left hand, leaving the right hand free for gun action. Combat training, which took place at 87Eleven's facility, included an obstacle course to prepare for the Wick house invasion.

=== Filming ===
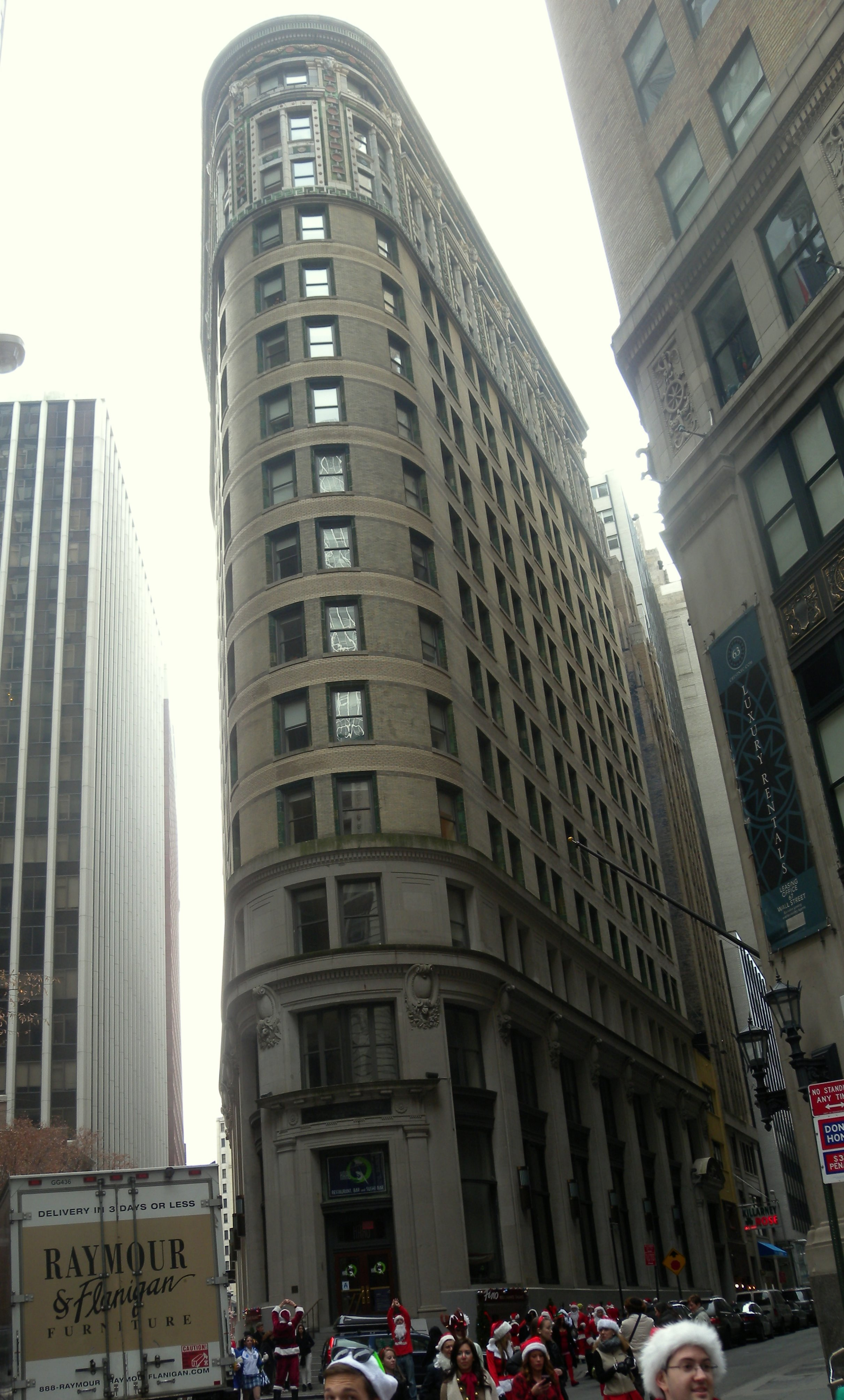
The Beaver Building (pictured in 2011) appears as the exterior of the Continental hotel.

Principal photography began on October 7, 2013, on a $20–$30 million budget, in and around New York City. (Note: The 2013 budget of $20–$30 million budget is equivalent to $27.6 million–$41.5 million in 2025.) Filming was arduous, with stresses over the schedule and budget. There was reduced daylight for associated scenes and extensive night-time filming in very cold weather. The initial five days of filming took place in Mill Neck village with scenes at John's house. Iwanyk recalled thinking John Wick would not work after watching the crew lighting a stuffed dog stand-in and several scenes of Reeves brooding. He changed his mind watching John's interaction with the police officer after killing a hitman squad, an absurd situation played with earnestness.

Cinematographer Jonathan Sela intended to use anamorphic lenses for scenes depicting John's domestic life to create a soft, clean image, and spherical lenses for his return to the underworld to create a grittier, darker, and sharper aesthetic. Once filming began, however, he opted to use the lenses for, respectively, day-and-night filming and contrast the use of a static camera position for the early segments in John's home and dynamic movements for the remainder of the film. He lit the underworld scenes in a gothic manner to make it appear with a mix of American and European designs, and illuminated characters in a manner that preserved the mystery of whether they were allies or adversaries to John.

Scenes at The Red Circle nightclub were filmed at Surrogate's Courthouse (exterior), Edison Theatre (club interior), and Aire Ancient Baths (below-ground spa). The production design added red-and-blue lighting and misted windows to the spa. Sela said they wanted it to look like a part of the underground, but they were constrained by the budget; he said this sometimes worked in their favor because it forced them to develop creative solutions. Perry was hired to choreograph the nightclub sequence at the last minute because Stahelski was occupied filming the final confrontation between John and Viggo. Perry, who portrays four characters killed by John in The Red Circle, was only told to begin in the nightclub and move up to the top level. Despite the choreography, improvisation based on spontaneous additions often took place during filming. Reeves's training allowed him to rapidly adapt to the changes and perform many of his own stunts, so filming often operated quickly. Iwanyk said they could capture as much footage in an afternoon as some others could over three days. (Note: Attributed to multiple references:)

The combat sequences adhered strictly to the number of bullets available in John's weapons, and scenes were crafted to include segments of John reloading at realistic intervals. Any alterations, such as the introduction of additional enemies, prompted corresponding adjustments to the bullet count, necessitating the relocation of reloading segments. Challenges arose during the club sequence due to incorrect gear acquisitions, including a holster that impeded Reeves's ability to draw his gun and the use of a silencer attachment that proved impractical. Minor timing issues in scenes at the spa and the club's upper floor posed difficulties, and insufficient footage to conceal the inconsistencies led to alterations in choreography and scenes to more clearly establish character locations. Reeves was also ill; according to Iwanyk, he would vomit between takes then insist on continuing filming. The insurers refused to approve Reeves performing a fall from the club's upper floor; Spidell stood in for falls and other hard impacts.

The fight scene between John and Viggo posed challenges during its filming over five nights at Brooklyn Navy Yard. The temperature was regularly 36 °F (2 °C) and the production was prohibited from using artificial rain on one evening because temperatures dropped too low. Reeves also refused to wear a wetsuit to help prevent hypothermia. Iwanyk thought the scene was an ill-fitting end to the film and would not fare well with audiences because John was fighting an older man. Additionally, the directors had initially planned for a more elaborate vehicle sequence involving several cars, but only two vehicles arrived.

The Beaver Building served as the location for exterior scenes at The Continental, and interior scenes were filmed at various buildings across Manhattan and Brooklyn, including the Cunard Building, Hotel Wolcott, and a bank vault in the Financial District; Marble was glued to its surfaces to make it appear expensive. Exterior scenes set at Viggo's headquarters were filmed at the Maritime Exchange Building and on the roof of ModernHaus SoHo on Grand Street. Filming also took place at Calvary Cemetery, a gas station in Upper Nyack, Republic Airport, Manhattan Bridge, Schaefer Landing, and Bethesda Terrace and Fountain. The church scene was conceived as a bank heist but scouts had difficulty finding a suitable location. Ultimately, Stahelski and Leitch opted for a church setting, considering it an interesting hideout. Interior scenes were filmed at St. Francis Xavier Church, while the exterior combines the Williamsburgh Savings Bank Building in New York and the Immanuel Presbyterian Church in Los Angeles.

Filming concluded on December 20, 2013, after nine weeks. The directors described it as a difficult learning experience that included many mistakes, and stretched the limits of the budget and schedule, but was ultimately successful. Kolstad lamented the loss of his favorite scene, in which two men at Aurelio's garage recognize John's car and promptly vacate the premises, due to scheduling issues.

=== Post-production ===
John Wick entered post-production on January 10, 2014. Iwanyk characterized this phase as challenging, given the prevailing skepticism about the film's potential success, and with most of the principal cast and crew having already transitioned to other projects.

Editor Elísabet Ronaldsdóttir was mainly known for her work on low-budget independent drama films, but her shared dislike for close-up action shots won over the directors. There was no budget for reshoots and no coverage material, so she had to work with the available footage. Iwanyk disliked an early, longer cut because the excessive action made the experience numbing, and there were too many establishing shots of people walking or driving. Filmmaker James Mangold also provided input on two different cuts of the film as a favor to the directors who had recently worked with him on The Wolverine (2013).

Ronaldsdóttir edited the film substantially to reduce the runtime to 101 minutes; this version was more positively received. Stahelski was unhappy with the removal of some scenes, but Ronaldsdóttir said they generally removed repetitiveness and shortened action scenes to focus on action and spend less time on John's mourning. John's fight with Ms. Perkins was trimmed to avoid depicting excessive violence against women by a man. Ronaldsdóttir, expressing no regret for the cuts, highlighted her enjoyment in trimming dialogue. She emphasized that, while the written words may be perfect on the page, much of it becomes redundant when brought to life by actors with props, sets, and lighting. The directors found balancing the tone with the exaggerated action to be the most difficult part of the production. Stahelski wanted the action to be an integral continuation of the story rather than just a set piece, while Leitch emphasized the delicate balance needed to avoid being too cheesy, serious, funny, or action-oriented. (Note: Attributed to multiple references:)

John Wick was shown to a few of Iwanyk's close associates, who gave a tepid response. A public test screening took place in Orange County, California; Iwanyk said he knew it was well received when the audience loudly laughed after the scene in which Aurelio tells Viggo his son has upset John, and Viggo replies "oh". The response was positive enough that they held no more test screenings. The death of John's dog remained a point of contention in post-production for Iwanyk, who believed it would alienate audiences and did not justify the number of deaths in response, but Kolstad and Reeves lobbied to retain it. Stahelski recounted Reeves telling him:

You guys wanted to make a hard-core action movie, right? You wanted to do something genre, outside the box, right? So what's wrong? ... So we went back and adjusted our attitude to being unapologetic, and we just went, "John Wick kills 80 guys because of a puppy. Fuck you, we're done."

Test audiences were supportive of John avenging his puppy. Despite Stahelski's and Leitch's collaboration, the Directors Guild of America (DGA) refused to co-credit them as directors due to internal rules, and Leitch was credited as a producer.

=== Music ===
Tyler Bates and Joel J. Richard composed the score. Stahelski and Leitch requested a "fun, raw, aggressive, unorthodox" score that reflected John's connection to his wife and his hitman past. They also wanted a clear difference between the music in each action sequence. Bates and Richard used a separate tone for the underscore that would allow it to move into the score's "more rocking aspects". Bates said they tried to understand John's thought process and establish the essence of his story; they began writing with the opening scene, which initially featured quicker transitions between John's mourning and the action sequence at the film's denouement. John Wick's soundtrack also includes songs such as "Killing Strangers" by Marilyn Manson, "The Red Circle" by Le Castle Vania, "Evil Man Blues" by The Candy Shop Boys, "In My Mind" by M86 & Susie Q, and "Who You Talkin' To Man" by Ciscandra Nostalghia. Ronaldsdóttir suggested the use of "Think" by Kaleida.

== Release ==
=== Distribution and marketing ===
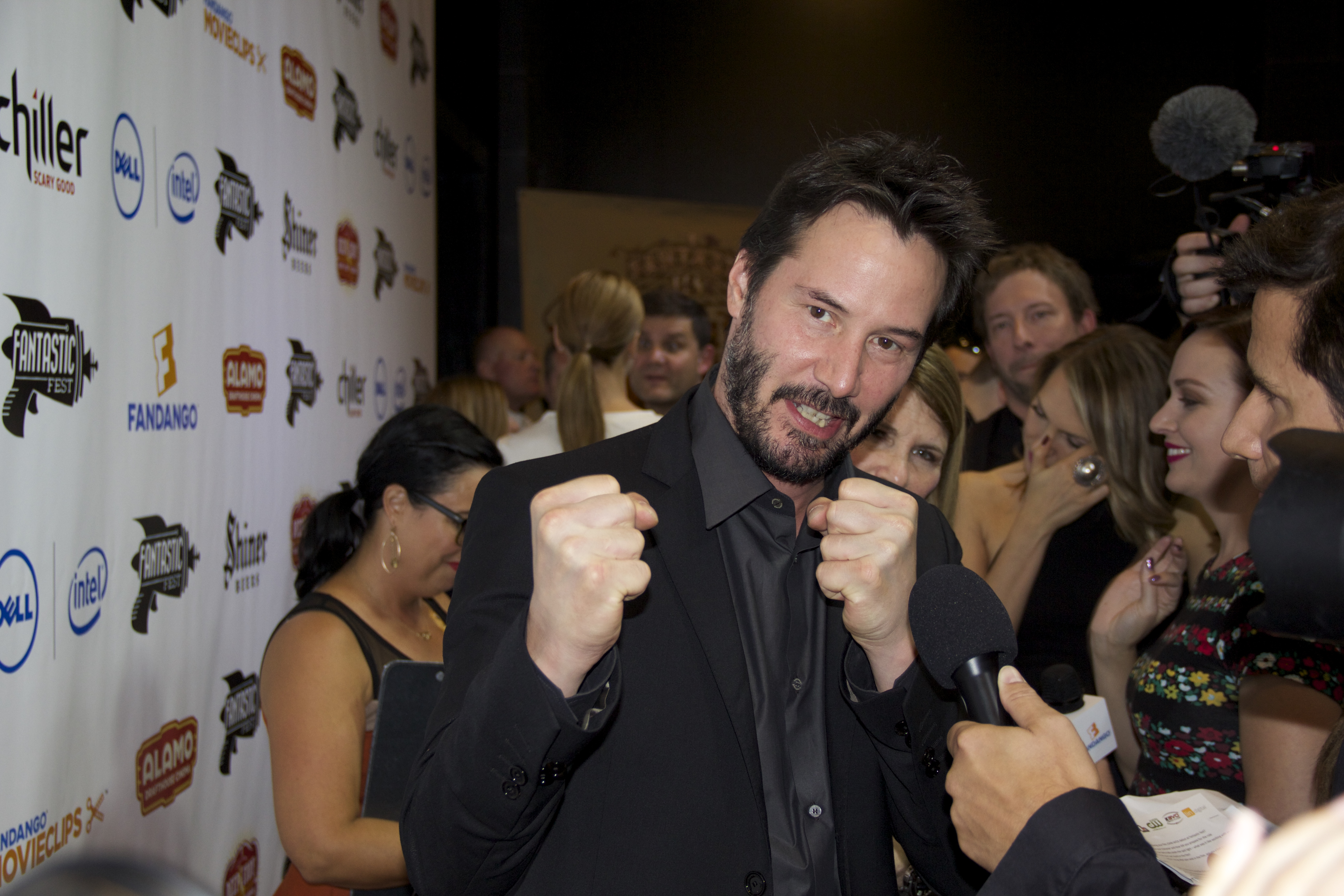
Keanu Reeves (in 2014) promoting John Wick at Fantastic Fest in Austin, Texas

By August 2014, John Wick had no secured distributor. Industry professionals blamed the lack of interest on its untested directors and Iwanyk's relative inexperience in independent film production. Additionally, Reeves's recent films, such as 47 Ronin and Man of Tai Chi (both 2013), had performed poorly, even in countries where he was expected to have a strong following, such as China and Japan. Despite having secured strong presales in certain countries, Iwanyk said significant territories were not showing interest.

A screening arranged for studio acquisition executives went poorly; one viewer walked out shortly after it started. Lionsgate Films emerged as the sole bidder, offering terms that included no upfront payment and a minimal release commitment, which Iwanyk interpreted as meaning John Wick would go straight to home video. However, Lionsgate executives Jason Constantine and Tim Palen championed John Wick, and set an October release date through its subsidiary Summit Entertainment. (Note: Attributed to multiple references:) The John Wick title came late in production; dissatisfied with the original title Scorn, Reeves regularly referred to the film as John Wick in interviews, which Lionsgate executives equated to "seven million dollars in free press".

A trailer created by Palen was well received, as were pre-release screenings at the 2014 Austin Film Festival (AFF) and Fantastic Fest. Audience demand at Fantastic Fest led to two additional screenings. In the week leading up to its release, John Wick was screened at no cost to audiences in 42 cities across the United States. Box office analyst Scott Mendelson wrote Lionsgate's marketing campaign had taken a film with little audience awareness and generated interest by turning a "theoretical B-movie action pick-up into something of an A-level event... [and] a coronation for its iconic star [Reeves]". According to Lionsgate executives, audiences had a favorable opinion of Reeves because of his candid nature in interviews regarding his personal and professional successes and failures. In October, Lionsgate announced John Wick would play in IMAX theaters, which was considered a superior theatrical experience and further raised the film's profile. Even so, expectations for John Wick were low due to Reeves's recent box-office failures and the short promotion cycle. (Note: Attributed to multiple references:)

As a promotional tie-in, the first-person shooter game Payday 2 (2013) added John Wick as a playable character in the week leading up to the film's release. Free copies of the game were given to people who purchased tickets for the film early via online ticket retailer Fandango. Variety noted the idea of targeting the same male audience as John Wick without the cost of making a full game based on the property.

=== Box office ===
John Wick was premiered at Regal Union Square Theater in New York City on October 13, 2014; Reeves was accompanied by Andy, the puppy that portrays John's dog. The event was hosted in partnership with watch company Carl F. Bucherer.

John Wick was released in the United States and Canada on October 24. During its opening weekend, the film grossed $14.4 million across 2,589 theaters—an average of $5,568 per theater, making it the number-two film of the weekend behind the debut of Ouija ($19.9 million) and ahead of Fury ($13.3 million), which was in its second weekend. The success of John Wick was a surprise, nearly doubling analysts' low expectations and pre-release estimates of $7–$10 million, and over-performing across 347 IMAX theaters with $2.5 million, accounting for 18% of its total box-office take. The film primarily drew a male audience, and approximately 77% of the viewers were over 25 years old. John Wick fell to number six in its second weekend with a gross of $8 million, and number eight in its third with $4.1 million. It left the top-ten highest-grossing films by its fourth weekend with a gross of $2.2 million. John Wick left theaters by January 22, 2015, with a total box-office take of $43 million, making it the 79th-highest-grossing film of the year.

Outside the U.S. and Canada, John Wick is estimated to have grossed a further $43 million, with its highest grosses coming from Germany ($3.7 million), France ($3.2 million), Australia ($2.8 million), Taiwan ($2.6 million), Russia ($2.59 million), the United Kingdom ($2.4 million), and Japan ($2.3 million). This made it the 114th-highest-grossing film of the year outside of the U.S. and Canada. Worldwide, John Wick grossed an estimated $86 million, making it the 89th-highest-grossing film of 2014. (Note: The 2014 box office gross of $86 million is equivalent to $117 million in 2025.)

== Reception ==
=== Critical response ===
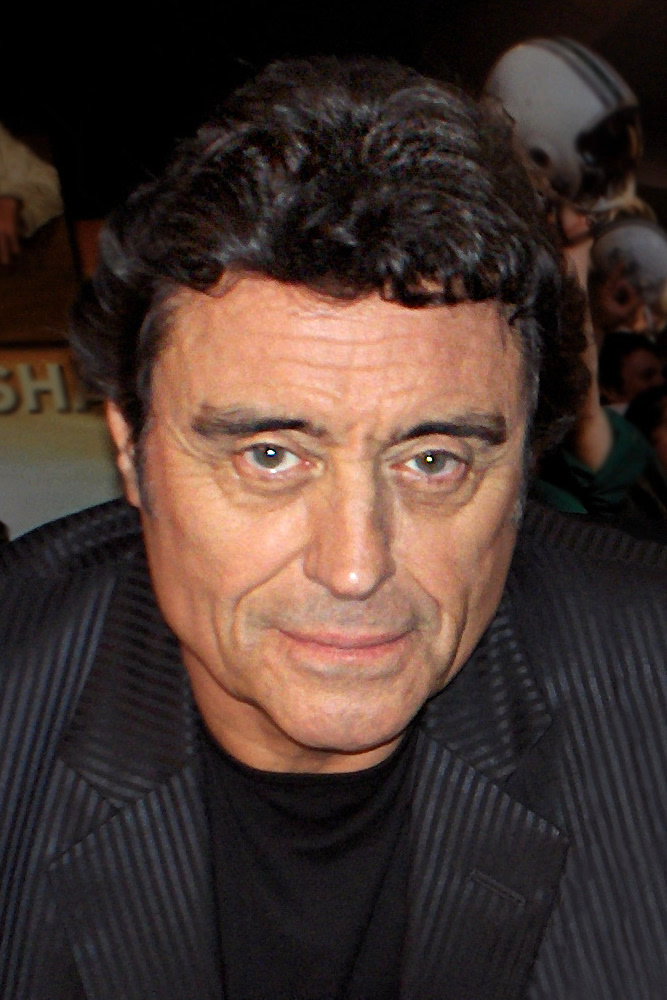
The main cast, particularly Ian McShane (pictured in 2006) and Michael Nyqvist, were praised by several critics.

John Wick received generally positive reviews. On the website Rotten Tomatoes, the film has an 86% approval rating from the aggregated reviews of 225 critics and an average score of 6.9/10. The consensus reads; "Stylish, thrilling, and giddily kinetic, John Wick serves as a satisfying return to action for Keanu Reeves – and what looks like it could be the first of a franchise". The film has a score of 68 out of 100 on Metacritic based on 40 critics, indicating "generally favorable" reviews. Audiences polled by CinemaScore gave the film an average grade of "B" on an A+-to-F scale.

Critics, including Peter Travers and Stephanie Zacharek, praised Reeves's performance, describing it as a return to form. (Note: Attributed to multiple references:) Richard Corliss, among others, said it was a fitting role for the actor that benefits from his stoic, taciturn demeanor for a character who conveys intent through actions. Bilge Ebiri said John Wick would have been a typical revenge story with any other actor but the "ethereal and ageless" Reeves makes it "mythic". (Note: Attributed to multiple references:) The Atlantic and The New York Times praised Reeves for being able to suggest depths to his character and portray a physical charisma while maintaining a relatively blank expression. (Note: Attributed to multiple references:) Others said his believable physicality and athleticism enhances the many combat sequences and long single takes. (Note: Attributed to multiple references:) Peter Bradshaw of The Guardian, however, wrote that Reeves's deadpan style could only work when contrasted with humorous dialogue, and considered John Wick to be humorless. Praise was also given to the main supporting cast, particularly McShane and Nyqvist, though The Atlantic believed the supporting cast was underused. (Note: Attributed to multiple references:)

Reviewers saw the directors' decades of experience in stunt work as a major benefit to the action sequences, which Zacharek described as among the "most beautifully choreographed" set-pieces in an American action film for a long time. (Note: Attributed to multiple references:) Reviews commended the fluidity of the action sequences and the skill displayed by the performers. (Note: Attributed to multiple references:) They considered the choreography to be inventive, opting for a straightforward and impactful style over slow-motion effects, resulting in heightened shock value. The action scenes were lauded for their adeptness, with their ruthless and effective nature mirroring the demeanor of the central character. Some publications highlighted John Wick's deliberate avoidance of shaky camera movements and quick editing in favor of long takes that help immerse the audience in the sleek choreography, which differentiated it from other action films. Variety said the large number of equally impressive action sequences compensated for the weak script.

While critics generally described the narrative as a self-serious, cliché-filled, and predictable action script with a stylistic approach, they said it offered a novel setting, creating intrigue related to John's past and the mythology that developed around the criminal underworld. (Note: Attributed to multiple references:) The mythology in John Wick was identified as a key aspect that differentiated it from other action films, particularly the codes and rules that govern the criminals, and the Continental hotel, which provided a reprieve to the otherwise non-stop violence in the rest of the film. (Note: Attributed to multiple references:) Entertainment Weekly praised the rich and stylish world-building, and The Guardian's Jordan Hoffman hoped for future films to explore this setting, even without the John Wick characters.

=== Accolades ===
At the 2014 Golden Schmoes Awards, John Wick was named the Biggest Surprise of the Year, and was nominated for Most Underrated Movie and Coolest Character (Wick). Reeves received a nomination for the Razzie Redeemer Award at the 35th Golden Raspberry Awards. At the 2015 Taurus World Stunt Awards, John Wick won the award for Best Fight for the scene in which Wick defends his home against Viggo's hitmen. The award was presented to Reeves's stunt double Jackson Spidell; stunt coordinators Darrin Prescott and Jonathan Eusebio; fight coordinator Jon Valera; and stunt performers Carlos Lopez, Daniel Hernandez, Dean Neistat, Justin Yu, Akos Schenek, and Luis Moco. Prescott was also nominated for Best Stunt Coordinator and/or 2nd Unit Direction. At the Golden Trailer Awards, which recognizes marketing campaigns, John Wick's poster was named Best Thriller Poster, and was nominated for Best Action Trailer and Best Action Poster. Dafoe received the Body of Work award at the San Diego Film Critics Society Awards 2014 for films including John Wick.

== Post-release ==
=== Home media ===
John Wick was released as a digital download in January 2015. This was followed by a DVD and Blu-ray release in February. The physical release includes a commentary track by Stahelski and Leitch; and six brief featurettes about the training and design of the stunt work, the making of the film, Stahelski's and Leitch's history as stunt coordinators, aspects of the criminal underworld, the nightclub action sequence, and the influence of New York City on John Wick. The home-media release was the second-best-selling home release of February behind Dracula Untold (2014), and the number-one rental during its release week. About 50% of its sales were on Blu-ray. A 4K Ultra HD Blu-ray version was released in 2017, containing all of the previously released features. The digital release had grossed about $20 million by May 2015, and the physical release about $44 million by 2022. Varèse Sarabande released the soundtrack in October 2014.

=== Other media ===
John Wick Chronicles (2017) is a virtual reality (VR), first-person shooter video game based on the film for HTC Vive and Steam VR, allowing users to play as John while assassinating powerful targets. John Wick Hex (2019) is a tactical, third-person video game that serves as a prequel to the film; the game involves John rescuing Winston and Charon. The video game Fortnite added John Wick as a playable character in 2019. A five-issue comic book series based on the franchise was released between September 2017 and January 2018. The series, which was written by Greg Pak, is a prequel to John Wick, depicting John's integration into the assassin underworld. The book They Shouldn't Have Killed His Dog: The Complete Uncensored Ass-Kicking Oral History of John Wick, Gun Fu, and the New Age of Action (2022) by Edward Gross and Mark A. Altman, provides details of the making of the film.

The 2025 documentary, Wick is Pain, directed by Jeffrey Doe, chronicles the making of John Wick and its sequels, highlighting the creative struggles and extensive stunt work involved.

== Thematic analysis ==
=== John Wick as the epic hero ===
According to Professor Ann C. Hall, John Wick is a postmodern epic hero in a contemporary epic universe. She said the John Wick franchise satisfies five of the six requirements to be classified as an epic: the imposing hero is of national or international importance and legendary significance; the setting is vast; the hero conducts great deeds of valor or superhuman courage; the tale involves powerful forces; and characters speak in stylized ways. Hall believed it fails the requirement of objectivity because John is the protagonist and is generally presented positively. Hall links the narrative to elements of Samurai lore, Russian folktales, and historical epics from Christianity, ancient Greece, Rome and the Mediterranean. Wayne Wong wrote Stahelski and Reeves have collaborated throughout their careers with choreographers familiar with action in Kung fu films, such as Yuen Woo-ping and Tiger Chen, and that John Wick can be seen as a synthesis of Eastern and Western action styles.

=== Keanu Reeves and action hero tropes ===
Owen R. Horton described John as "one of the deadliest and most brutal heroes in modern action cinema", but unlike other contemporary action heroes, John regularly retreats to his soft side, which is defined by his love for his wife. This, Horton says, represents the conflicting multiplicities of manhood. On an extradiegetic level, author Simon Bacon places John in a broader context, relating both to the genre he operates within and to the actor who portrays him. As the narrative unfolds, he increasingly assumes the role of an action hero, though he is portrayed as older and wearier than the typical genre archetype. This positions him alongside other iconic action figures like John McClane (portrayed by Bruce Willis) and John Rambo (Sylvester Stallone), who are similarly drawn into battles against overwhelming odds. A common feature is the actors' age and their characters' ability to survive extreme physical punishment. Wick, like McClane and Rambo, sustains severe injuries, but what sets Wick apart is the volume and intensity of violence he endures. This creates a mythic quality around John, aligning him with characters like Eric Draven (Brandon Lee) in The Crow (1994), who, like Wick, is portrayed as a revenant figure—someone who rises from the grave, driven by an unfulfilled quest. Wick's uncanny ability to survive fatal wounds lends credibility to the idea that he cannot die until his mission is completed. John's seemingly supernatural ability to survive these injuries hints at an underlying death wish—his longing to be reunited with his wife, Helen. His subconscious drive toward death, however, manifests as a reckless disregard for his own safety rather than a direct desire for suicide.

Hall also analyzed John from the perspective of Reeves's personal life. She said the character and hero share many characteristics, and that in the vein of epic heroes, Reeves faced obstacles in his career but persisted with acting despite criticism; he faced personal trials of courage and loss that inspire his character and make audiences sympathetic to him. Both professor Lisa Coulthard and author Lindsay Steenberg said Reeves's and John's personalities are almost interchangeable, sharing a similar mixed-race background, personal tragedies, professionalism, and an inherent likeability—all of which add authenticity to the character and film.

Professor Sarah Thomas wrote that while The Matrix was a defining role for Reeves, it was not originally tailored specifically for him. It was not until the 2010s that Reeves effectively established his own unique star persona, partly influenced by online discussions about his public image, which generated an almost mythical and malleable perception of Reeves. Thomas argued that because the script for John Wick was reworked with Reeves in mind, his public image played a significant role in shaping and interpreting the character. This contrasts with his role in The Matrix, where the character's meaning would likely remain unchanged with a different actor in the part. According to Thomas, this alignment between Reeves's authenticity and image and the character of John Wick made it a perfect fit, as Reeves's persona filled gaps in the film's narrative.

=== Moral ambiguity ===
Comparisons to McClane, Rambo, and Draven also emphasize the moral justification behind Wick's actions. Bacon described these narratives, in which the protagonists are typically seen as righteous, forced into conflicts not of their choosing, but bound by a sense of honor or duty. Audiences forgive the violence because it is framed as deserved or just. John's association with these figures strengthens the perception that he is justified in his violent actions, particularly as he often faces much younger adversaries. However, John's past as a professional assassin complicates his moral standing, and John Wick does not dwell on any guilt or remorse he may feel about this aspect of his life.

Despite this morally ambiguous history, the audience's perception of John is shaped by the actor who plays him. Much like Willis's off-screen persona influenced the character of McClane, Reeves's real-life reputation plays a significant role in how John is viewed. Hall describes Reeves being widely regarded as a humble, kind-hearted, and down-to-earth figure, qualities that inform the audience's reading of Wick. His likability and good deeds outside the film industry elevate John's character, making his grief over his wife, his desire for peace, and the murder of his dog resonate on a deeper, more emotional level. The final gift of the puppy Daisy, from his wife, symbolizes John's new beginning and the potential for hope, as well as serving as a continuing connection to Helen and a demonstration of John's softer side. However, when figures from his past invade his life and kill Daisy, it symbolizes the destruction of the future he yearned for—forcing him back into his former violent world—and serves as sufficient justification for John's actions, in the eyes of the audience. As John tells Viggo: "When Helen died, I lost everything. Until that dog arrived on my doorstep... I received some semblance of hope... an opportunity to grieve unalone... And your son... took that from me... Stole that from me... Killed that from me!" At the conclusion of John Wick, John adopts a pit bull. Bacon said that, unlike Daisy, this new dog is not a symbol of grief but a fitting companion and solidification of John's transition back to a violent world.

According to critic Emanuel Levy, the central question of John Wick is whether John is a bad person who became good or a good person who has done bad things; and whether he can truly change or be redeemed. Kolstad said even though John had left his former life behind, he remains in the outskirts of the city, sees a reminder of it every time he leaves his home, and does not truly escape its shadow. The shift back to his former life is cemented when John unearths a chest of weapons and gold coins hidden beneath his house's floor, signifying that his seemingly peaceful life was built upon the foundation of his violent past. His return to violence, while not sentimental, is familiar and inevitable, conforming to the classic notion of nostalgia as the need to return to the familiar in the face of loss. Wick's reawakening in this world is portrayed as both a return to his true self and a necessary confrontation with the past he can no longer escape. John exists in a liminal space between the present and the past. Even when he is physically in the moment, his mind is elsewhere, temporally porous, as his body reflects this detachment through its ability to endure punishment. The wounds he suffers are not merely physical; they represent the past constantly seeping into the present, transforming him. This kind of Gothic porosity intensifies as John progresses through the series, with his body and mind becoming more entangled with his traumatic past. Professor Scott T. Alison and Doctor George R. Goethal said that while John has faults and is a ruthless killer, he does not have to objectively do good, and his heroism is retaining his integrity against the unjust, violent criminal underworld.

=== Purgatory ===
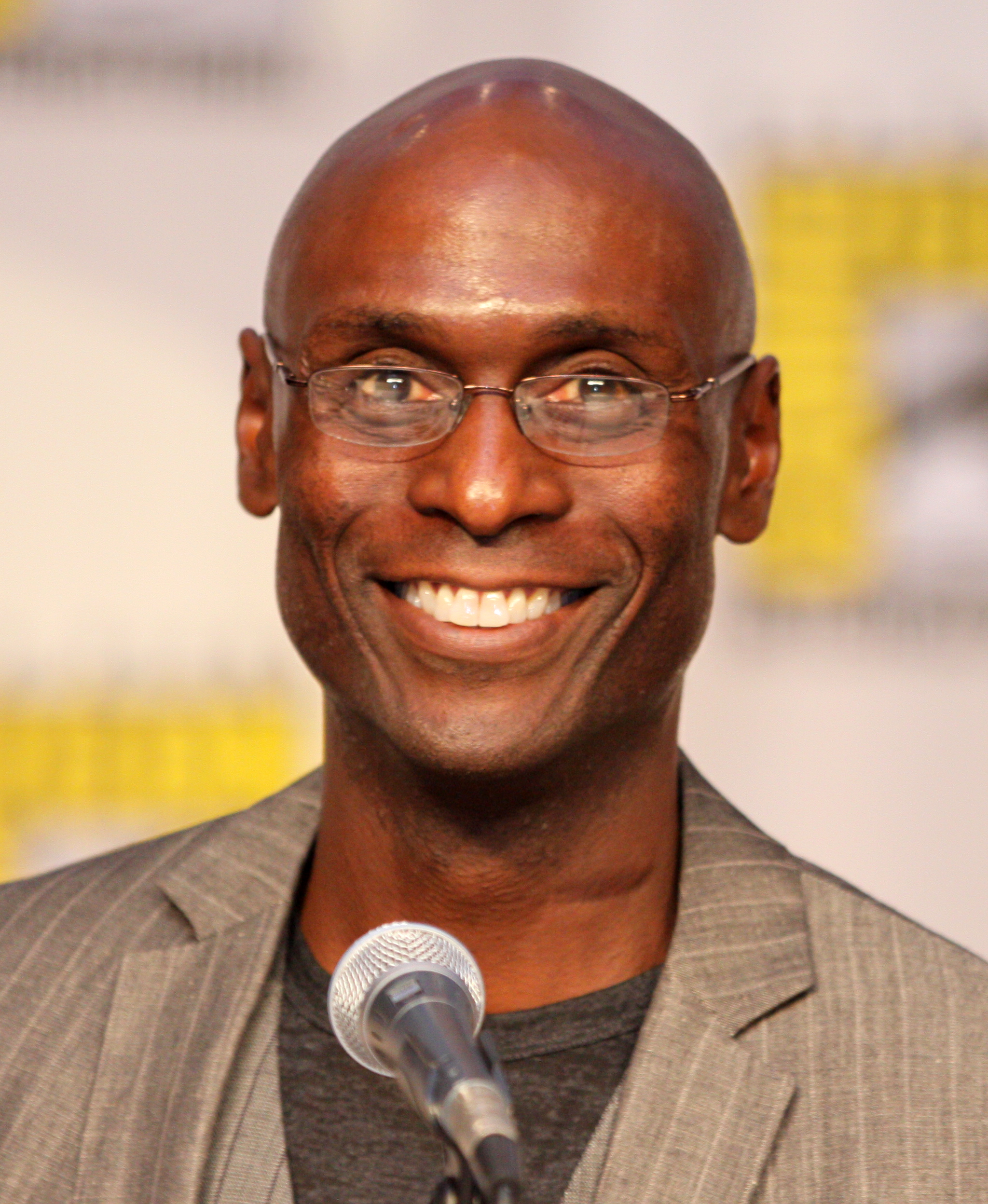
Lance Reddick in 2010. His character, Charon, was compared to the Greek mythology ferryman Charon, both serving to ferry individuals between worlds.

Bacon analyses John Wick as a symbol of purgatory. During the opening, as John watches a video of his wife on his phone, he passes out, only to wake up in a flashback to the day of her funeral. Here, layers of nostalgia unfold as he reflects on his past with Helen. Nostalgia becomes John's way of existing in the world, as he remains perpetually trapped in a purgatorial state, unable to move forward. This purgatory is symbolized by John's descent into the criminal underworld, which mirrors poet Dante Alighieri's Inferno. John's involvement with Viggo and The High Table takes him through ever-deepening layers of this underworld, each representing a further step away from the heaven of his life with Helen. The pull of the past becomes inescapable with the arrival of Iosef, whose actions drag John back into the underworld, symbolically making Viggo responsible for both John's exit and his return.

The film blends Gothic elements like secret realms, codes of honor, and a collapsing of temporalities, creating a dream-like space where violence and death pervade. As the narrative unfolds, it hints at a much darker, almost occult underworld, epitomized by the Continental Hotel, where assassins and gang bosses meet under strict rules of honor. Winston enforces these rules, and its concierge, Charon, symbolically ferries guests between the realms of light and dark, reinforcing a Gothic duality. This underworld is governed by The High Table, and rules such as no violence within the hotel's premises underscore its chivalric, almost medieval, sense of honor. Bacon describes The High Table as a metaphor for the global elite who control the world through wealth and violence. In contrast, John is framed as an authentic figure, representing natural honor, wronged repeatedly by this corrupt system. While the High Table enforces laws to benefit itself, John becomes the Everyman fighting back against this corrupt power structure.

== Legacy ==
Analysts considered John Wick's success to be an example of a cult sleeper hit driven by strong word-of-mouth, and a positive critical reception from critics and audiences. (Note: Attributed to multiple references:) Some publications, such as Empire and Time Out, and critics including Stephanie Zacharek have listed John Wick as a high point in contemporary action films. (Note: Attributed to multiple references:) Others, such as IGN and Syfy listed John Wick among the best films in Reeves's filmography; in 2024, The Guardian named it his best film. In 2025, it was one of the films voted for the "Readers' Choice" edition of The New York Times' list of "The 100 Best Movies of the 21st Century," finishing at number 212. In July 2025, it ranked number 74 on Rolling Stone's list of "The 100 Best Movies of the 21st Century."

Commentary by Rolling Stone and Collider said that before John Wick, the action genre had been in decline. They wrote that popular film series such as Die Hard and Rambo had been replaced with "forgettable" fare that heavily relied on CGI, shaky camera movements, and rapid edits, or a focus on larger-than-life superhuman bouts in superhero films. (Note: Attributed to multiple references:) In contrast, publications described John Wick as a groundbreaking entry in the action genre, in part because of its extensively choreographed sequences and practical effects that were filmed in long takes. (Note: Attributed to multiple references:) Author Ray Morton said the film revitalized the action genre by combining choreography, video-game style visuals, and explicit gore and violence.

John Wick's popularity grew following its release on home video and streaming services, increasing support for a sequel, (Note: Attributed to multiple references:) which in turn led to a financially and critically successful action film series, (Note: Attributed to multiple references:) and gave Reeves his most-mainstream success since The Matrix films. Rolling Stone named it "The Last Great American Action-Movie Franchise", transforming what would normally be a B-movie into an "action-cinema connoisseur's dream come true". The mythology involved in the criminal underworld is also seen as contributing to the film's success. Iwanyk said the filmmakers had no idea during the production how evocative the underworld would be with audiences. Just as John Wick drew inspiration from the history of action cinema, it has subsequently been regarded as a significant influence on numerous action films that followed. These include Atomic Blonde (2017), Guns Akimbo (2019), and Extraction (2020), as well as several 2021 releases such as Gunpowder Milkshake, Jolt, The Protégé, and Nobody; the latter was written by Kolstad and produced by Leitch.

Far Out described John as a groundbreaking role for Reeves, the character's pragmatic attitude, slick appearance, and relatable revenge story serving to revive the actor's career. MovieWeb wrote that John's in-narrative status as a legendary character before the film begins was a "genius" decision that adds depth to the character and his universe while the film keeps him sympathetic through the loss of his wife and puppy. The publication said Reeves's iconic status contributed to the character's popularity, and that his dedication to performing many of his own stunts and learning combat techniques led to similar approaches from other actors, such as Charlize Theron in Atomic Blonde and Bob Odenkirk in Nobody. John Wick's success made Stahelski and Leitch in-demand action directors; Stahelski directed the sequels while Leitch moved outside the series to direct films such as Atomic Blonde, Deadpool 2 (2018), Hobbs & Shaw (2019), and Bullet Train (2022).

Reeves's portrayal of John earned him recognition for similar roles, such as Shadow the Hedgehog in Sonic the Hedgehog 3 (2024); the character's interpretation in the film was largely inspired by the parallels between John's and Shadow's backstory. According to director Jeff Fowler, Reeves's sympathetic approach to John was "the perfect, albeit unconventional, 'audition'" for Shadow.

In 2025, The Hollywood Reporter listed John Wick as having the best stunts of 2014.

== Sequels and spin-offs ==
John Wick was not intended to have a sequel but its success, particularly outside the U.S., led to immediate development on a follow-up. John Wick: Chapter 2 (2017) doubled the box-office take of John Wick, and received a similarly positive critical and audience response. It was followed by John Wick: Chapter 3 – Parabellum (2019), which nearly quadrupled the box-office take of John Wick. (Note: Attributed to multiple references:) A fourth film, John Wick: Chapter 4, was released in March 2023, receiving critical praise and becoming the highest-grossing film in the series. (Note: Attributed to multiple references:) A fifth chapter of the John Wick series is in development as of 2025.

The success of the John Wick films launched a media franchise that includes spin-off films and television series. The Continental: From the World of John Wick (2023) is a prequel miniseries focusing on Winston and the Continental hotel during the 1970s. Ballerina (2025) is a spin-off film set during the events of John Wick: Chapter 3 – Parabellum and starring Ana de Armas as Eve Macarro, a Ruska Roma assassin on her own quest for revenge.

As of 2025, there are multiple John Wick projects in development: Caine, a spin-off film which will follow the blind assassin Caine, portrayed by Donnie Yen in John Wick: Chapter 4; a television series, John Wick: Under the High Table, set after the events of John Wick: Chapter 4, in a world where John's actions have left the criminal underworld in chaos; and an untitled anime film which will serve as a prequel to John Wick.

== Works cited ==
- Bacon, Simon (2024). ""But Now, Yeah, I'm Thinking I'm Back": The All-Consuming Gothic Nostalgia in the John Wick Franchise". In Bacon, Simon; Bronk-Bacon, Katarzyna (eds.). Gothic Nostalgia: The Uses of Toxic Memory in 21st Century Popular Culture. United Kingdom: Palgrave Macmillan. doi:10.1007/978-3-031-43852-3. ISBN 978-3-031-43852-3.
- Coulthard, Lisa; Steenberg, Lindsay (2022). "Red Circle of Revenge: Anatomy of the Fight Sequence in John Wick". The Worlds of John Wick: The Year's Work at the Continental Hotel. Bloomington, Indiana: Indiana University Press. ISBN 978-0-253-06241-3. OCLC 1298389868.
- Gross, Edward; Altman, Mark A. (2022). They Shouldn't Have Killed His Dog – the Complete Uncensored Ass-Kicking Oral History of John Wick, Gun Fu, and the New Age of Action. New York City: St. Martin's Press. ISBN 978-1-250-27843-2. OCLC 1263340546.
- Hall, Ann C. (2022). "John Wick: Keanu Reeves's Epic Adventure". Heroism Science. 7 (2). Richmond, Virginia: University of Richmond. doi:10.26736/hs.2022.01.08.
- Horton, Owen R. (2022). "Masculinity, Isolation, and Revenge: John Wick's Liminal Body". The Worlds of John Wick: The Year's Work at the Continental Hotel. Bloomington, Indiana: Indiana University Press. ISBN 978-0-253-06241-3. OCLC 1298389868.
- Thomas, Sarah (2022). "Keanu Reeves, John Wick, and the Myths and Tensions Between Star Brands and Franchise Properties". Celebrity Studies. 13 (2). Abingdon-on-Thames, Oxfordshire: Routledge: 244–258. doi:10.1080/19392397.2022.2063405.
- Wong, Wayne (2022). "Killing in Equanimity: Theorizing John Wick's Action Aesthetics". The Worlds of John Wick: The Year's Work at the Continental Hotel. Bloomington, Indiana: Indiana University Press. ISBN 978-0-253-06241-3. OCLC 1298389868.
