= Grafik Dynamo =

Digital artwork by Kate Armstrong and Michael Tippett

- Author: Kate Armstrong, Michael Tippett
- Language: English
- Genre: internet art, electronic literature
- Publisher: Turbulence
- Publication date: 2005
- Publication place: Canada

Grafik Dynamo is an online artwork and work of electronic literature by Kate Armstrong and Michael Tippett, commissioned by the arts organization Turbulence and published in 2005. Grafik Dynamo creates a constantly changing three-frame graphic comic strip by combining speech bubbles and text frames with text written by Armstrong with images that are pulled in from user posts to LiveJournal and Flickr.

== About the work ==
The work is published on a website, and presents the reader/view with a comic strip where the words and images are constantly changing. The reader has no opportunity to interact with the work other than the initial launch. Images and words are pulled in from multiple sources, including Live Journal, Flickr, and news sites. Serge Bouchardon describes the work as a "constantly changing mock graphic novel".

Grafik Dynamo was commissioned by Turbulence, a project of the American nonprofit organization New Radio and Performing Arts that commissioned works of internet art and electronic literature. It was also exhibited at The Prairie Gallery in Alberta, Canada in 2008.

== Reception ==
In an essay analysing the work, literary critic Joseph Tabbi argues that Grafik Dynamo is evidence that narrative and literary works produced for electronic media are incompatible, yet his analysis is detailed and explores the literary qualities of Grafik Dynamo at length.

Serge Bouchardon frames the work as subversive, because it "undermines the reading principles of printed written material" by its constant change. It looks like a conventional comic strip, a genre the reader knows is usually carefully composed and to have a coherent narrative. However, this comic is quite different. The relationship between speech bubbles and images, or between each of the three frames in the comic, is "haphazard and inconsistent, and any narrative coherence is pure coincidence."
