= Kaleida (band) =

English-German electro pop duo

- Years active: 2013–present
- Labels: Embassy One & Lex Records
- Members: Christina Wood; Cicely Goulder
- Website: Official Website

Kaleida are an English-German duo formed in 2013. The band consists of vocalist Christina Wood and keyboardist Cicely Goulder. Their sound is often described as mystical, haunting, dark and simultaneously hopeful. Kaleida released their debut EP, Think, in 2015, followed by Detune in 2016. This was followed by their first album, Tear the Roots, in 2017 and Odyssey in 2020. Their third album, In Arms, came out in 2024.

In 2014, the band's title track from their debut EP appeared on the soundtrack of the action film John Wick. They have been featured on numerous other TV shows, Netflix series, and the movie Atomic Blonde.

== History ==
=== 2013–2015: Formation and Think ===
Kaleida formed in 2013, when Wood and Goulder were introduced by a mutual friend through email. At the time, Wood had been at work in the forests of Borneo while recording demos in her bedroom each night, while Goulder had been composing for film productions in London. From 2013 to late 2014, the duo released demos of songs "Think" and "Tropea", releasing a video for the latter in 2013. On 19 December 2014 Lex Records announced they had signed Kaleida and would be releasing their debut extended play, Think, on 6 April 2015. In 2014, Kaleida garnered worldwide attention when their song, "Think", was featured in the 2014 action film John Wick and its soundtrack. The song's minimalist structure specifically contrasted the violent scenes in which it was used.

=== 2015: Touring and Detune ===
In a 2015 interview with Ground Sounds, Kaleida stated that following their European tour with Róisín Murphy, the band would begin work on their debut album. On 3 November 2015 Kaleida released a new single, "Detune". On 24 February 2016 the band released a new single, "It's Not Right", and a second EP, Detune, was released on 26 February.

=== 2017: Tear The Roots ===
Kaleida released their debut album, Tear The Roots, on 15 September 2017.

=== 2020: Odyssey ===
Kaleida released their second album, Odyssey, on 28 August 2020.

=== 2024: In Arms ===
Kaleida released their third album, In Arms, on Embassy Records, on 22 March 2024. The pair wrote and produced the album largely long-distance, as Wood had re-located from London to the US in 2019.

=== 2025: New release ===
Wood announced she is working on a solo release under her project Vesper Wood.

== Members ==
- Christina Wood - vocals (2013–present)
- Cicely Goulder - keyboards, production (2013–present)

== Discography ==
=== Extended plays ===
- Think (Lex Records, 2015)
- Detune (Lex Records, 2016)

=== Albums ===
- Tear the Roots (Lex Records, 2017)
- Odyssey (Lex Records, 2020)
- In Arms (2024)

=== Singles ===
- "Think" (2013)
- "Tropea" (2013)
- "Picture You" (2014)
- "Aliaa" (2015)
- "Detune" (2015)
- "It's Not Right" (2016)
- "99 Luftballons" (2017)
- "Other Side" (2020)
- "Long Noon" (2020)
- "Odyssey" (2020)
- "Smells Like Teen Spirit" (2020)

=== Appearances on soundtracks ===
- John Wick: Original Motion Picture Soundtrack - "Think" (2014)
- CSI – "Aliaa" (2014)
- Search Party - "The Call" (2016)
- Atomic Blonde: Original Motion Picture Soundtrack - "99 Luftballons" (2017)
- Wu Assassins (Netflix Original Series S1:E1) - "Aliaa" (2019)
- Monarca (Netflix Original Series) - "The Call" and "Aliaa" (2019)
- Charmed (Netflix Original Series) - "Detune" (2019)
