= Examiner.com =

Former news website

- Logo
- Website type: Citizen journalism
- Available in: English
- Owner: Anschutz Entertainment Group
- Website: www.examiner.com
- Commercial: Yes
- Registration: Optional, required to comment
- Launched: September 1994 (domain registered by San Francisco Examiner); April 2008 (launch in present format)
- Current status: Defunct (July 10, 2016)

Examiner.com was an American news website based in Denver, Colorado, that operated using a network of 'pro-am' contributors for content. It had various local editions with contributors posting city-based items tailored to 238 markets throughout the United States and parts of Canada in two putative national editions, one for each country.

As of early 2014, Examiner.com was a property of the Philip Anschutz-owned AEG, and announced it would be partnering closely with ticket merchant AXS. Subsequently, Examiner operations were announced to be shutting down on July 10, 2016.

== Growth ==
In August 2009, Examiner.com was named one of the fastest-growing network of localized websites by Nielsen Online. It grew faster in the 12 months from August 2008 than any of the other top 30 Internet news sites in the United States, as it increased page views more than 342 percent, attracting 7,569,000 unique users. Examiner.com reports that it received 20.8 million unique visitors to Examiner.com sites in July 2010, with 60.1 million page views served, according to Omniture.

In October 2010, Examiner.com reported adding over 3,000 articles a day, to a growing library of 1.5 million pieces of content.

== Pay scale ==
Examiner.com was criticized for the low compensation received by some contributors. The site claimed it told contributors that they should not consider this full-time employment, and that it tried to be "very clear and transparent that this isn't a 'quit your day job' opportunity".

Examiner.com offered a variety of pay scale options to its writers. It based compensation on variables such as subscriptions, page view traffic and session length.

== History ==
The Examiner.com domain was registered by the San Francisco Examiner on September 13, 1994, and was used by the newspaper until 2004 when Anschutz/Clarity acquired the domain as part of its acquisition of the newspaper.

In 2006, David Schafer, Clarity Digital Media's CEO (former MapQuest general manager), transformed the domain from being San Francisco specific to being a hyperlocal news aggregator for the 60 markets in which Clarity Media trademarked the name "Examiner". By using online geotargeting technology, users were placed into their closest city where they could read the most recent news and updates from both their city's broadcast and print media streams. Readers could also view local, state, national, and international content from the Associated Press.

A small team of engineers and developers worked over the next 18 months to develop the site into something more than a collection of news headlines. Schafer was replaced by the former AOL executive Michael Sherrod in February 2008. (He stayed on as Chief Operations Officer.)

In late April 2008, Sherrod unveiled the current model of using "Examiners", local writers and columnists recruited for expertise in a variety of areas, to feature local material about numerous cities. Launching the new model, which he called a "community knowledge site", were 115 "Examiners" in five markets: Denver, Seattle, Baltimore, San Francisco, and Washington, D.C. The latter three already had free distribution of printed Examiner newspapers in certain neighborhoods. The flagship national edition was for users outside designated market areas.

In March 2009, Sherrod was replaced by Rick Blair, also formerly of AOL. In September 2009 Clarity Media purchased NowPublic, a Vancouver-based website consisting of "citizen journalists" contributing from around the world. Clarity Media developed the Clarity Digital Group, including both Examiner.com and NowPublic. Blair is the CEO of both Clarity Digital and Examiner.com.

On October 29, 2009, the website's first international expansion took place when Examiner.com Canada was launched in Calgary, Montreal, Ottawa, Toronto, and Vancouver, along with a national Canadian edition. In 2010 it moved from a ColdFusion to Drupal platform. In February 2011, Google changed its algorithm, significantly reducing how high Examiner.com and other aggregators, particularly of "how-to" content, appear in search results. The algorithm sought to spot and downplay "content farms" and to highlight more reliable sources. Commentators suggest that some readers may rely more on articles recommended by their social networks. Due to Google's change, search results decreased by 79% for Examiner.com.

On January 23, 2014, Examiner.com announced that it had been acquired by AEG and that it would be partnering closely with AXS.

On July 1, 2016, Examiner.com announced it would shut down on or around July 10, 2016.

== Criticism ==
Matt Smith of the San Francisco Weekly noted in 2007 that numerous articles and photos by Sharon Gray were from other sources, including the Sacramento Bee, and constituted apparent plagiarism. Smith suggested that the case showed that "free isn't always a bargain". When questioned, Jim Pimentel, executive editor of Examiner.com said, "They're blogs. They don't get edited. We don't give any direction to people on what to write in their blogs. And that's standard operating procedure."

After Smith brought the issue to Pimentel's attention, the voluminous Gray material was removed from Examiner.com. Pimentel said Examiner.com has "a less-strict standard for accuracy and attribution in stories that appear on the Web" than for publications in print.

== See also ==
- Content farm
