= Bob Seger discography =

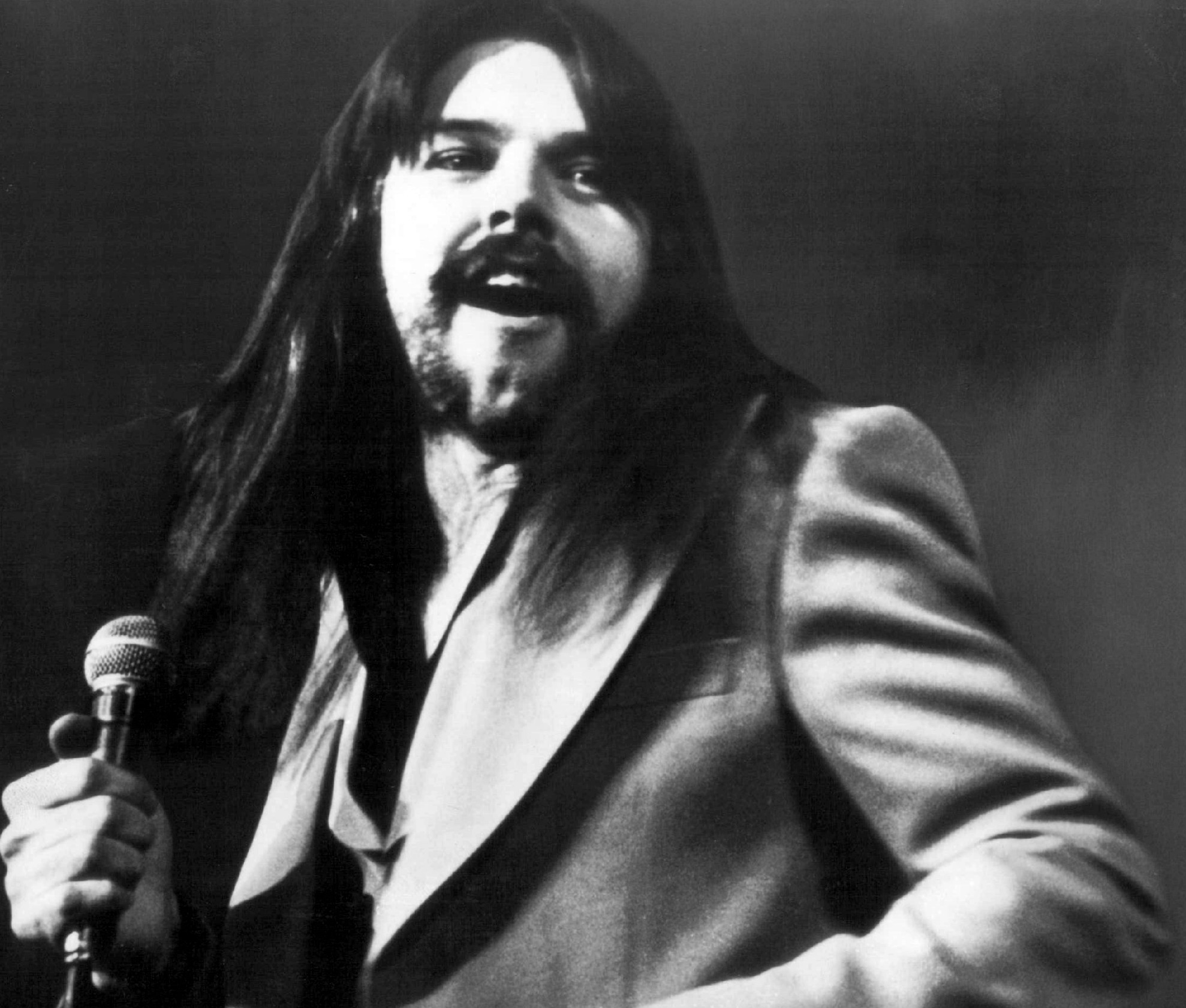
- Seger in 1977
- Studio albums: 18
- Live albums: 2
- Compilation albums: 7
- Singles: 68
- Guest singles: 2
- Guest appearances: 17

The discography of Bob Seger, an American rock artist, includes 18 studio albums, two live albums, seven compilation albums and more than 60 singles (including regional releases and collaborations). Bob Seger's albums have sold over 50 million copies and received seven multi-platinum, four Platinum and two Gold certifications by the RIAA.

With the single exception of 1972's Smokin' O.P.'s, re-released on CD with remastered sound by Capitol in 2005, all of Seger's albums prior to 1975's Beautiful Loser (the pre-Silver Bullet Band releases) have long remained out of print. The albums Ramblin' Gamblin' Man (1969), Mongrel (1970) and Seven (1974) were briefly available on CD in 1993. Noah (1969), Brand New Morning (1971) and Back in '72 (1973) were available only on vinyl/tape formats and have never been officially reissued on CD, but all three were unofficially reissued in 2008 in Argentina on the Lost Diamonds label.

== Albums ==
=== Studio albums ===
==== The Bob Seger System (1969–1970) ====
Title	Album details	Peak chart positions
Title	Album details	US
Ramblin' Gamblin' Man	Released: April 1969; Label: Capitol (172); Formats: LP, cassette, 8-track, CD, digital download, streaming	62
Noah	Released: September 1969; Label: Capitol (236); Formats: LP, cassette, 8-track	—
Mongrel	Released: August 1970; Label: Capitol (499); Formats: LP, cassette, 8-track, CD	171
"—" denotes a recording that did not chart or was not released in that territory.

==== Bob Seger (1971–1975, 2006–2017) ====
Title	Album details	Peak chart positions						Certifications (sales thresholds)
Title	Album details	US	US Rock	BEL (WA)	CAN	GER	SWI	Certifications (sales thresholds)
Brand New Morning	Released: October 1971; Label: Capitol (731); Formats: LP, 8-track	—	—	—	—	—	—	
Smokin' O.P.'s	Released: August 1972; Label: Palladium (1006); Reprise (2109); Formats: LP, cassette, 8-track, CD	180	—	—	—	—	—	
Back in '72	Released: January 1973; Label: Reprise (2126); Formats: LP, cassette, 8-track	188	—	—	—	—	—	
Seven	Released: March 1974; Label: Reprise (2184); Formats: LP, cassette, 8-track, CD	—	—	—	—	—	—	
Beautiful Loser	Released: April 12, 1975; Label: Capitol (11378); Formats: LP, cassette, 8-track, CD, digital download, streaming	131	—	—	—	—	—	RIAA: 2× Platinum
Face the Promise	Released: September 12, 2006; Label: Capitol (54506); Formats: CD, digital download, streaming	4	2	—	6	—	—	RIAA: Platinum; MC: Gold
Ride Out	Released: October 14, 2014; Label: Capitol; Formats: CD, LP, digital download, streaming	3	1	—	12	—	—	
I Knew You When	Released: November 17, 2017; Label: Capitol; Formats: CD, LP, digital download, streaming	25	2	181	69	74	87	
"—" denotes a recording that did not chart or was not released in that territory.

==== Bob Seger & The Silver Bullet Band (1976–1995) ====
Title	Album details	Peak chart positions								Certifications (sales thresholds)
Title	Album details	US	AUS	AUT	GER	NOR	SWI	SWE	UK	Certifications (sales thresholds)
Night Moves	Released: October 22, 1976; Label: Capitol (ST-11557); Formats: LP, cassette, 8-track, CD, digital download, streaming	8	13	—	—	—	—	—	—	RIAA: 6× Platinum; MC: 3× Platinum
Stranger in Town	Released: May 15, 1978; Label: Capitol (SW-11698); Formats: LP, cassette, 8-track, CD, digital download, streaming	4	12	—	28	—	—	45	31	RIAA: 6× Platinum; BPI: Gold; MC: 4× Platinum
Against the Wind	Released: February 27, 1980; Label: Capitol (SOO-12041); Formats: LP, cassette, 8-track, CD, digital download, streaming	1	6	—	17	38	—	11	26	RIAA: 5× Platinum; MC: 5× Platinum
The Distance	Released: December 13, 1982; Label: Capitol (ST-12254); Formats: LP, cassette, 8-track, CD, digital download, streaming	5	13	19	16	4	—	19	45	RIAA: Platinum; MC: Platinum
Like a Rock	Released: March 27, 1986; Label: Capitol (46195); Formats: LP, CD, cassette, digital download, streaming	3	24	30	53	4	17	12	35	RIAA: Platinum; MC: Platinum
The Fire Inside	Released: August 27, 1991; Label: Capitol (91134); Formats: LP, CD, cassette, digital download, streaming	7	99	33	—	7	14	33	54	RIAA: Platinum; MC: Platinum
It's a Mystery	Released: October 24, 1995; Label: Capitol (99774); Formats: CD, cassette	27	—	—	—	—	—	—	—	RIAA: Gold; MC: Gold
"—" denotes a recording that did not chart or was not released in that territory.

=== Live albums ===
Title	Album details	Peak chart positions					Certifications (sales thresholds)
Title	Album details	US	AUS	GER	NZ	UK	Certifications (sales thresholds)
Live Bullet	Released: April 12, 1976; Label: Capitol (STBK-11523); Formats: LP, cassette, 8-track, CD, digital download, streaming	34	—	—	—	—	RIAA: 5× Platinum; MC: 2× Platinum
Nine Tonight	Released: September 4, 1981; Label: Capitol (STBK-12182); Formats: LP, cassette, 8-track, CD, digital download, streaming	3	22	34	37	24	RIAA: 4× Platinum; MC: Platinum
"—" denotes a recording that did not chart or was not released in that territory.

=== Compilation albums ===
Title	Album details	Peak chart positions						Certifications (sales thresholds)
Title	Album details	US	AUS	GER	NZ	SWI	UK	Certifications (sales thresholds)
The Bob Seger Collection	Released: 1979; Label: Capitol (ST24812); Formats: LP	—	1	—	—	—	—	
Greatest Hits	Released: October 25, 1994; Label: Capitol (30334); Formats: LP, CD, cassette, digital download, streaming	8	5	49	4	46	6	RIAA: Diamond (10× Platinum); ARIA: Platinum; BPI: Gold; MC: 3× Platinum
Greatest Hits 2	Released: November 4, 2003; Label: Capitol (52772); Formats: CD, digital download, streaming	23	—	—	—	—	—	RIAA: Platinum
Early Seger Vol. 1	Released: November 24, 2009; Label: Capitol; Formats: CD, digital download	—	—	—	—	—	—	
Ultimate Hits: Rock and Roll Never Forgets	Released: November 21, 2011; Label: Capitol; Formats: CD, digital download, streaming	19	—	—	—	—	28	RIAA: Platinum; ARIA: Gold; BPI: Gold; MC: Platinum
Heavy Music: The Complete Cameo Recordings 1966–1967	Released: September 7, 2018; Label: Capitol; Formats: CD, digital download, streaming	—	—	—	—	—	—	
Sweet Summertime	Released: June 25, 2025; Label: Universal; Formats: Digital download, streaming	—	—	—	—	—	—	
"—" denotes a recording that did not chart or was not released in that territory.

== Singles ==
=== 1960s ===
Single	Year	Peak chart positions			Band	Album
Single	Year	US CB	US BB	CAN	Band	Album
"The Lonely One"	1961	—	—	—	The Decibels	Non-album singles
"TGIF"	1965	—	—	—	Doug Brown and The Omens	Non-album singles
"Ballad of the Yellow Beret"	1966	—	—	—	Doug Brown and The Omens (as The Beach Bums)	Non-album singles
"East Side Story"	1966	111	—	—	Bob Seger & The Last Heard	Non-album singles
"Sock It to Me Santa"	1966	—	—	—	Bob Seger & The Last Heard	Non-album singles
"Persecution Smith"	1967	118	—	—	Bob Seger & The Last Heard	Non-album singles
"Vagrant Winter"	1967	—	—	—	Bob Seger & The Last Heard	Non-album singles
"Heavy Music"	1967	70	103	82	Bob Seger & The Last Heard	Non-album singles
"2 + 2 = ?"	1968	90	—	79	The Bob Seger System	Ramblin' Gamblin' Man (1969)
"Ramblin' Gamblin' Man"	1968	22	17	18	The Bob Seger System	Ramblin' Gamblin' Man (1969)
"Ivory"	1969	101	97	—	The Bob Seger System	Ramblin' Gamblin' Man (1969)
"Noah"	1969	114	103	—	The Bob Seger System	Noah (1969)
"Innervenus Eyes"	1969	—	—	—	The Bob Seger System	Noah (1969)
"—" denotes a single that did not chart or was not released in that territory.

=== 1970s ===
Title	Year	Peak chart positions							Certifications	Album
Title	Year	US CB	US	US AC	AUS	CAN	CAN AC	UK	Certifications	Album
"Lucifer"	1970	72	84	—	—	—	—	—		Mongrel (1970)
"Lookin' Back"	1971	97	96	—	—	—	—	—		Non-album single
"If I Were a Carpenter"	1972	91	76	—	—	—	—	—		Smokin' O.P.'s (1972)
"Midnight Rider"	1972	—	—	—	—	—	—	—		Back in '72 (1973)
"Turn the Page"	1972	—	—	—	—	—	—	—	RIAA: Platinum	Back in '72 (1973)
"Who Do You Love"	1973	—	—	—	—	—	—	—		Smokin' O.P.'s (1972)
"Rosalie"	1973	—	—	—	—	—	—	—		Back in '72 (1973)
"Need Ya"	1974	—	—	—	—	—	—	—		Seven (1974)
"Get Out of Denver"	1974	82	80	—	—	—	—	—		Seven (1974)
"U.M.C. (Upper Middle Class)"	1974	—	—	—	—	—	—	—		Seven (1974)
"Beautiful Loser"	1975	103	103	—	—	—	—	—		Beautiful Loser (1975)
"Katmandu"	1975	45	43	—	—	57	—	—		Beautiful Loser (1975)
"Nutbush City Limits" (live)	1976	77	69	—	—	85	—	—		'Live' Bullet (1976)
"Travelin' Man" (live)	1976	—	—	—	—	—	—	—		'Live' Bullet (1976)
"Night Moves"	1976	6	4	—	25	5	—	45	RIAA: 2× Platinum	Night Moves (1976)
"Mainstreet"	1977	19	24	—	—	1	—	—	RIAA: Gold	Night Moves (1976)
"Rock and Roll Never Forgets"	1977	50	41	—	—	48	49	—		Night Moves (1976)
"Still the Same" (Note: "Still the Same" also peaked at #30 on the German Singles Chart and #18 on the Austria Top 40 chart.)	1978	4	4	27	23	4	—	—	RIAA: Gold	Stranger in Town (1978)
"Hollywood Nights"	1978	13	12	—	52	12	—	42	RIAA: Gold	Stranger in Town (1978)
"We've Got Tonite"	1978	11	13	29	31	9	6	41		Stranger in Town (1978)
"Old Time Rock and Roll"	1979	34	28	—	—	31	—	—	RIAA: 2× Platinum; BPI: Silver	Stranger in Town (1978)
"—" denotes a single that did not chart or was not released in that territory.

=== 1980s ===
Title	Year	Peak chart positions								Certifications	Album
Title	Year	US CB	US BB	US AC	US Main.	AUS	CAN	CAN AC	UK	Certifications	Album
"Fire Lake"	1980	6	6	31	x	57	3	4	—		Against the Wind (1980)
"Against the Wind"	1980	8	5	8	x	92	6	—	—	RIAA: Platinum	Against the Wind (1980)
"You'll Accomp'ny Me"	1980	20	14	17	x	—	8	23	—		Against the Wind (1980)
"The Horizontal Bop"/ "Her Strut"	1980	55	42	—	x	—	—	—	—		Against the Wind (1980)
"Tryin' To Live My Life Without You" (live)	1981	8	5	—	2	—	11	—	—		Nine Tonight (1981)
"Feel Like a Number" (live)	1981	54	48	—	—	—	29	—	—		Nine Tonight (1981)
"Hollywood Nights" (live)	1981	—	—	—	—	—	—	—	49		Nine Tonight (1981)
"We've Got Tonight" (live)	1982	—	—	—	—	—	—	—	60		Nine Tonight (1981)
"Shame on the Moon" (Note: "Shame on the Moon" also peaked at number 15 on the US Billboard Hot Country Singles chart, number 10 on the Canadian RPM Country Tracks chart, and number 50 on the German Singles Chart.)	1982	5	2	1	—	38	8	1	—		The Distance (1982)
"Even Now"	1983	9	12	—	2	100	35	—	73		The Distance (1982)
"Roll Me Away"	1983	28	27	—	13	—	—	—	—		The Distance (1982)
"Old Time Rock and Roll"	1983	38	48	—	—	3	—	—	—		Risky Business soundtrack (1984)
"Understanding"	1984	20	17	7	5	83	38	—	—		Teachers soundtrack (1984)
"American Storm"	1986	17	13	—	2	—	26	—	78		Like a Rock (1986)
"Like a Rock"	1986	15	12	21	1	74	33	5	—		Like a Rock (1986)
"It's You"	1986	62	52	22	8	—	—	12	—		Like a Rock (1986)
"Miami"	1986	60	70	—	47	—	—	—	—		Like a Rock (1986)
"Shakedown"	1987	1	1	—	1	9	1	—	88		Beverly Hills Cop II soundtrack (1987)
"Blue Monday"	1989	—	—	—	40	—	—	—	—		Road House soundtrack (1989)
"—" denotes a single that did not chart or was not released in that territory. "x" denotes that the chart did not exist.

=== 1990s–2010s ===
Title	Year	Peak chart positions								Album
Title	Year	US	US AC	US Rock	AUS	CAN	CAN AC	GE	UK	Album
"Take a Chance"	1991	—	—	10	—	—	—	—	—	The Fire Inside (1991)
"The Real Love"	1991	24	4	4	92	1	1	51	—	The Fire Inside (1991)
"The Fire Inside"	1991	—	45	6	—	36	35	54	—	The Fire Inside (1991)
"In Your Time"	1994	—	—	—	—	19	25	—	—	Greatest Hits (1994)
"We've Got Tonight" (reissue)	1995	—	—	—	—	—	—	—	22	Greatest Hits (1994)
"Night Moves" (reissue)	1995	—	—	—	—	—	—	—	45	Greatest Hits (1994)
"Hollywood Nights" (reissue)	1995	—	—	—	—	—	—	—	52	Greatest Hits (1994)
"Lock and Load" (Note: "Lock and Load" also peaked at number 57 on the UK Singles Chart.) (rock mix)	1995	—	—	22	—	29	—	—	57	It's a Mystery (1995)
"Manhattan"	1995	—	—	—	—	—	—	—	—	It's a Mystery (1995)
"Hands in the Air"	1996	—	—	29	—	67	—	—	—	It's a Mystery (1995)
"Chances Are" (Note: "Chances Are" also peaked at number 70 on the Canadian RPM Country Tracks chart.) (with Martina McBride)	1998	—	23	—	—	—	40	—	—	Hope Floats soundtrack (1998)
"Wait for Me" (Note: "Wait for Me" also peaked at number 52 on the US Billboard Hot Country Singles chart.)	2006	—	17	—	—	—	—	—	—	Face the Promise (2006)
"Wreck This Heart"	2006	—	—	—	—	—	—	—	—	Face the Promise (2006)
"Downtown Train"	2011	—	17	—	—	—	—	—	—	Ultimate Hits: Rock and Roll Never Forgets (2011)
"Hey Hey Hey Hey (Going Back to Birmingham)"	2011	—	—	—	—	—	—	—	—	Ultimate Hits: Rock and Roll Never Forgets (2011)
"Detroit Made"	2014	—	—	—	—	—	—	—	—	Ride Out (2014)
"You Take Me In"	2014	—	—	—	—	—	—	—	—	Ride Out (2014)
"Busload of Faith"	2017	—	—	—	—	—	—	—	—	I Knew You When (2017)
"Shakedown" (live)	2019	—	—	—	—	—	—	—	—	Non-album single
"—" denotes a single that did not chart or was not released in that territory.

=== Guest singles ===
Single	Artist	Year	Peak chart positions						Album
Single	Artist	Year	US Main	US Adult	US Country	CAN	GER	NLD	Album
"Landing in London"	3 Doors Down	2005	32	31	—	55	32	37	Seventeen Days (2005)
"Collide"	Kid Rock (with Sheryl Crow)	2011	—	26	51	—	—	—	Born Free (2010)
"—" denotes a single that did not chart or was not released in that territory.

== Guest appearances ==
Year	Song	Album	Notes
1978	"Night Moves"	FM Soundtrack (1978)	Originally released on Night Moves (1976).
1978	"Radioactive"	Gene Simmons (1978) (Kiss album)	Seger sang backing vocals on this song from the Kiss bassist Gene Simmons' solo album also featuring guitarist Joe Perry of Aerosmith. It was also released as a single.
1978	"Living in Sin"	Gene Simmons (1978) (Kiss album)	Seger sang backing vocals on this song from the Kiss bassist's solo album also featuring Cher.
1980	"Nine Tonight"	Urban Cowboy Soundtrack	This studio version of "Nine Tonight" should initially have been part of Against the Wind (1980); it is only available on this soundtrack album.
1981	"Feel Like a Number"	Body Heat (1981) movie	Originally released on Stranger in Town (1978)
1983	"Christmas in Cape Town" "Take Me Back"	Trouble in Paradise (Randy Newman album)	Bob Seger sings background vocals on "Christmas in Cape Town" and most notably on "Take Me Back".
1983	"Old Time Rock and Roll"	Risky Business Soundtrack (1984)	Originally released on Stranger in Town (1978).
1984	"Understanding"	Teachers Soundtrack (1984)	Also released as a single (b/w "East L.A.", which does not appear on any album) and on Greatest Hits 2 (2003).
1985	"Roll Me Away"	Mask Soundtrack	Played during movie's ending credit. Theatrical version only.
1986	"Living Inside My Heart"	About Last Night Soundtrack	Available on this soundtrack album, on the single "Like a Rock", and on a special edition of Ultimate Hits: Rock and Roll Never Forgets.
1987	"Shakedown"	Beverly Hills Cop II Soundtrack (1987)	Seger's only #1 single on the Billboard Hot 100; it can also be found on Greatest Hits 2 (2003) and Ultimate Hits: Rock and Roll Never Forgets (2011).
1987	"The Little Drummer Boy"	A Very Special Christmas	This Christmas song is also available on Ultimate Hits: Rock and Roll Never Forgets (2011).
1989	"Blue Monday"	Road House Soundtrack	This cover of the classic Fats Domino song was not released on any Seger album.
1994	"Against the Wind"	Forrest Gump Soundtrack	Originally released on Against the Wind (1980).
1994	"Sock It to Me Santa"	A Rock and Roll Christmas	Credited to Bob Seger (and the Last Heard); originally released as a single in 1966.
1998	"Chances Are" (with Martina McBride)	Hope Floats Soundtrack (1998)	This duet was also released on Greatest Hits 2 (2003).
1998	"Roll Me Away"	Armageddon Soundtrack	Originally released on The Distance (1982).
2005	"Landing in London"	Seventeen Days (2005) (3 Doors Down album)	Seger duets with Brad Arnold on this 3 Doors Down song; it was also released as a single.
2008	"Something in the Water"	Join the Band (Little Feat album)	Seger and Brad Paisley perform with Little Feat on this song.
2008	"Shakedown"	Now That's What I Call the 80s	This is the first 1980s compilation album in the US Now! Series.
2008	"Sock It to Me Santa"	Christmas a Go-Go	This compilation from Little Steven's Underground Garage incorrectly claims this track was "never available on a single compilation"
2013	"Who'll Stop the Rain"	Wrote a Song for Everyone (John Fogerty album)	Seger duets with John Fogerty

Bob Seger was considered for quite a few more film soundtracks that he ultimately did not appear on. In 1983, after the success of "Old Time Rock and Roll" in Risky Business (1983) starring Tom Cruise, the song "No Man's Land" was slated for Cruise's next film All the Right Moves (1983).

In 1985, Seger was asked to write the title track for Back to the Future (1985), but eventually "The Power of Love" by Huey Lewis and the News was used instead and became a massive hit. Seger's song was called "Yesterday Rules"; he performed the song live on his 1986 tour. That same year the unreleased song "Can't Hit the Corners No More", which had been recorded for Against the Wind (1980), was scheduled to appear on the soundtrack to The Color of Money (1986), again starring Tom Cruise, but that never happened.

In 1989, Seger was invited to record Roy Orbison's "Pretty Woman" as the title track for the movie of the same name (1990), but he turned the offer down, because he was doing recordings for his upcoming album, The Fire Inside (1991), at the time.

The song "Roll Me Away" was used in the 1984 movie Reckless and "Feel Like a Number" was used in the 1993 movie Striking Distance.

== Music videos ==
Video	Year
"Makin' Thunderbirds"	1983
"Like a Rock"	1986
"American Storm"	1986
"Shakedown"	1987
"The Fire Inside"	1991
"The Real Love"	1991
"Night Moves"	1994
"Chances Are"	1998
"Turn the Page"	2003
"Wait for Me"	2006
