= Ultimate Hits: Rock and Roll Never Forgets =

Compilation album by Bob Seger & The Silver Bullet Band
- Released: November 21, 2011
- Recorded: 1968–2011
- Genre: Rock
- Length: 108:06
- Label: Capitol

Bob Seger & The Silver Bullet Band chronology
Early Seger Vol. 1 (2009)	Ultimate Hits: Rock and Roll Never Forgets (2011)	Ride Out (2014)

Singles from Ultimate Hits: Rock and Roll Never Forgets
- 1. "Downtown Train" Released: February 28, 2011; 2. "Hey, Hey, Hey, Hey (Going Back to Birmingham)" Released: September 29, 2011

Professional ratings
Review scores
Source	Rating
AllMusic	4.5/5 stars
Classic Rock	7/10
Rockstar Weekly	5/5 stars

Ultimate Hits: Rock and Roll Never Forgets is a compilation album by American rock singer–songwriter Bob Seger. The double-disc album was released on November 21, 2011, and contains 26 remastered tracks from throughout Seger's career, which spans more than four decades. Included are the original mono version of "Ramblin' Gamblin' Man", Seger's first hit with The Bob Seger System from 1968, the classic Christmas song "The Little Drummer Boy" from 1987's A Very Special Christmas, which makes its first appearance on a Seger album, and previously unreleased cover versions of Tom Waits' "Downtown Train" and Little Richard's "Hey, Hey, Hey, Hey (Going Back to Birmingham)." There is also a Walmart exclusive edition that includes the bonus track "Living Inside My Heart," a song from the soundtrack of the 1986 film About Last Night..., which has also never before been released on any Bob Seger album. Two songs on this compilation album are edited compared to the original releases: "We've Got Tonight" is the single edit, which is about one minute shorter than the album version, and "Katmandu" is a newly edited version which omits the second verse, making the song also about one minute shorter compared to the original album version. In the US it was certified gold and platinum in June 2013 by the RIAA.

== Track listing ==
All tracks are written by Bob Seger, except where noted.

Disc 1
No.	Title	Writer(s)	Original album	Length
1.	"Old Time Rock and Roll"	George Jackson, Thomas E. Jones III	Stranger in Town, 1978	3:16
2.	"Hollywood Nights"		Stranger in Town	5:03
3.	"Night Moves"		Night Moves, 1976	5:25
4.	"Mainstreet"		Night Moves	3:44
5.	"Roll Me Away"		The Distance, 1982	4:41
6.	"Turn the Page" (Live)		Live Bullet, 1976; originally from Back in '72, 1973	5:14
7.	"Her Strut"		Against the Wind, 1980	3:54
8.	"Still the Same"		Stranger in Town	3:25
9.	"You'll Accomp'ny Me"		Against the Wind	4:01
10.	"We've Got Tonite" (Single edit)		Stranger in Town	3:41
11.	"Like a Rock"		Like a Rock, 1986	5:58
12.	"Fire Lake"		Against the Wind	3:34
13.	"Tryin' to Live My Life Without You" (Live)	Eugene Williams	Nine Tonight, 1981	4:09
Total length:				56:05

Disc 2
No.	Title	Writer(s)	Original Album	Length
1.	"Rock and Roll Never Forgets"		Night Moves	3:54
2.	"Against the Wind"		Against the Wind	5:34
3.	"Ramblin' Gamblin' Man"		Ramblin' Gamblin' Man (under the name "The Bob Seger System"), 1968	2:25
4.	"The Fire Down Below"		Night Moves	4:28
5.	"Travelin' Man" (Live)		Live Bullet; originally from Beautiful Loser, 1975	4:40
6.	"Beautiful Loser" (Live)		Live Bullet; originally from Beautiful Loser	3:42
7.	"Shakedown"	Harold Faltermeyer, Keith Forsey, Bob Seger	Beverly Hills Cop II Soundtrack, 1987	4:03
8.	"Shame on the Moon"	Rodney Crowell	The Distance	4:55
9.	"Katmandu" (Edited version)		Beautiful Loser	5:00
10.	"The Little Drummer Boy"	Harry Simeone, Henry Onorati, Katherine K. Davis	A Very Special Christmas, 1987	3:31
11.	"Wait for Me"		Face the Promise, 2006	3:43
12.	"Hey, Hey, Hey, Hey (Going Back to Birmingham)"	Richard Penniman	Previously unreleased, 2011	2:07
13.	"Downtown Train"	Tom Waits	Previously unreleased	3:59
Total length:				52:01

Walmart exclusive bonus track
No.	Title	Original Album	Length
14.	"Living Inside My Heart"	About Last Night Soundtrack	3:30
Total length:			55:31

== Charts ==
=== Weekly charts ===
Chart (2012)	Position
Australian Albums (ARIA)	5
Belgian Albums (Ultratop Flanders)	70
Dutch Albums (Album Top 100)	88
German Albums (Offizielle Top 100)	53
New Zealand Albums (RMNZ)	18

=== Year-end charts ===
Chart (2012)	Position
Australian Albums (ARIA)	40

== Certifications ==
Region	Certification	Certified units/sales
Australia (ARIA)	Gold	35,000^{^}
Canada (Music Canada)	Platinum	80,000^{^}
New Zealand (RMNZ)	2× Platinum	30,000^{‡}
United Kingdom (BPI)	Gold	100,000^{‡}
United States (RIAA)	Platinum	500,000^{^}
^{^} Shipments figures based on certification alone.^{‡} Sales+streaming figures based on certification alone.
