= Greatest Hits 2 (Bob Seger album) =

Compilation album by Bob Seger
- Released: November 4, 2003
- Recorded: various
- Genre: Rock
- Length: 67:09
- Label: Capitol
- Producer: various

Bob Seger chronology
It's a Mystery (1995)	Greatest Hits 2 (2003)	Face the Promise (2006)

Professional ratings
Review scores
Source	Rating
AllMusic	4.5/5 stars

Greatest Hits 2 is a compilation album by Bob Seger, released in 2003.

== Track listing ==
All tracks are written by Bob Seger except where noted.

No.	Title	Original Album	Length
1.	"Understanding"	Teachers soundtrack	3:44
2.	"The Fire Down Below"	Night Moves	4:27
3.	"Her Strut"	Against the Wind	3:51
4.	"Beautiful Loser"	Beautiful Loser	3:27
5.	"Sunspot Baby"	Night Moves	4:37
6.	"Katmandu"	Beautiful Loser	6:09
7.	"Shame on the Moon" (Rodney Crowell)	The Distance	4:52
8.	"Fire Lake"	Against the Wind	3:31
9.	"Tryin' to Live My Life Without You" (live) (Eugene Williams)	Nine Tonight	4:10
10.	"Shakedown" (Harold Faltermeyer, Keith Forsey, Seger)	Beverly Hills Cop II soundtrack	4:03
11.	"Manhattan"	It's a Mystery	5:23
12.	"New Coat of Paint" (Tom Waits)	The Fire Inside	3:28
13.	"Chances Are" (with Martina McBride)	Hope Floats soundtrack	4:18
14.	"Rock and Roll Never Forgets"	Night Moves	3:51
15.	"Satisfied"	previously unreleased	3:30
16.	"Tomorrow"	previously unreleased	3:39
17.	"Turn the Page" (bonus video)	Back in '72	–

Some later issues of the CD did not feature the two previously unreleased bonus tracks, nor the "Turn the Page" bonus music video.

== Personnel ==
As listed in the liner notes.

Track 1
- Chris Campbell – bass guitar
- Pete Carr – electric guitar
- Craig Frost – organ
- Russ Kunkel – drums
- Bill Payne – piano
- Bob Seger – lead vocals, acoustic guitar
- Julia Waters, Luther Waters, Maxine Waters, Oren Waters – background vocals
Track 2
- Drew Abbott – guitar
- Chris Campbell – bass guitar
- Charlie Allen Martin – drums
- Robyn Robbins – piano
- Bob Seger – lead vocals
Track 3
- Drew Abbott – guitar
- Chris Campbell – bass guitar
- Bob Seger – lead vocals, lead guitar
- David Teegarden – drums, percussion
Track 4
- Barry Beckett – grand piano, organ, synthesizer, electric piano
- Pete Carr – lead guitar, acoustic guitar
- Roger Hawkins – drums, percussion
- David Hood – bass guitar
- Jimmy Johnson – rhythm guitar
- Spooner Oldham – organ, electric piano
- Bob Seger – lead vocals
Track 5
- Barry Beckett – piano
- Pete Carr – lead guitar, rhythm guitar
- Roger Hawkins – drums, percussion
- David Hood – bass guitar
- Jimmy Johnson – rhythm guitar
- Bob Seger – lead vocals
Track 6
- Drew Abbott – guitar
- Barry Beckett – grand piano, organ, synthesizer, electric piano
- Kenny Bell – guitar
- Harrison Calloway – trumpet
- Pete Carr – lead guitar, acoustic guitar
- Ronald Eades – baritone saxophone
- Roger Hawkins – drums, percussion
- David Hood – bass guitar
- Jimmy Johnson – rhythm guitar
- Spooner Oldham – organ, electric piano
- Charles Rose – trombone
- Bob Seger – lead vocals, slide guitar, harmonica
- Stoney & Rocky – background vocals
- Harvey Thompson – tenor saxophone
Track 7
- Drew Abbott – guitar
- Chris Campbell – bass guitar
- Laura Creamer – background vocals
- Glenn Frey – harmony vocals
- Craig Frost – organ
- Bobbye Hall – percussion
- Russ Kunkel – drums
- Shaun Murphy – background vocals
- Bill Payne – piano
- Bob Seger – lead vocals, harmony vocals
- Joan Sliwin – background vocals
- Waddy Wachtel – guitar
Track 8
- Barry Beckett – piano
- Pete Carr – lead guitar, acoustic guitar
- Glenn Frey – harmony vocals
- Roger Hawkins – drums, percussion
- Don Henley – harmony vocals
- David Hood – bass guitar
- Jimmy Johnson – rhythm guitar
- Randy McCormick – organ
- Timothy B. Schmit – harmony vocals
- Bob Seger – lead vocals
Track 9
- Drew Abbott – electric guitar
- Chris Campbell – bass guitar, background vocals
- Craig Frost – piano, organ
- Pam Moore – background vocals
- Shaun Murphy – percussion, background vocals
- Alto Reed – alto saxophone, tenor saxophone
- Bob Seger – lead vocals, electric guitar
- David Teegarden – drums, background vocals
- June Tilton – background vocals
Track 10
- Harold Faltermeyer – Synclavier
- Keith Forsey – percussion
- Dann Huff – guitar
- Bob Seger – lead vocals
Track 11
- Roy Bittan – piano
- Bob Glaub – bass guitar
- Bob Seger – lead vocals
- Harry Stinson – drums
- Michael Thompson – guitar
- Jeffrey CJ Vanston – keyboards
Track 12
- Richie Hayward – drums
- Buell Neidlinger – stand-up bass
- Dean Parks – electric guitar
- Bill Payne – piano
- Bob Seger – lead vocals
- Fred Tackett – acoustic guitar
Track 13
- Eddie Bayers – drums
- Larry Byrom – guitar
- David Campbell – string arrangements
- Martina McBride – vocals
- Matt Rollings – piano
- Bob Seger – vocals
- Glenn Worf – bass guitar
Track 14
- Drew Abbott – guitar
- Chris Campbell – bass guitar
- Charlie Allen Martin – drums
- Alto Reed – saxophone
- Robyn Robbins – piano, organ
- Bob Seger – lead vocals
Track 15
- J. T. Corenflos – acoustic guitar
- Paul Leim – drums
- Steve Nathan – piano, organ
- Brent Rowan – electric guitar, acoustic guitar
- Bob Seger – lead vocals
- Glenn Worf – bass guitar
Track 16
- J. T. Corenflos – electric guitar
- Eric Darken – percussion
- Richie Hayward – drums
- Shaun Murphy – background vocals
- Bob Seger – lead vocals, electric guitar
- Glenn Worf – bass guitar
