= Greatest Hits (Bob Seger album) =

Greatest hits album by Bob Seger & The Silver Bullet Band
- Released: October 25, 1994
- Recorded: 1975–1994
- Genre: Rock
- Length: 61:54
- Label: Capitol
- Producer: Various

Bob Seger & The Silver Bullet Band chronology
The Fire Inside (1991)	Greatest Hits (1994)	It's a Mystery (1995)

Professional ratings
Review scores
Source	Rating
AllMusic	4.5/5 stars

Greatest Hits is a compilation album by Bob Seger & the Silver Bullet Band, released in 1994. Certified Diamond by the RIAA, it is Seger's most successful album to date. In December 2009, Billboard and Nielsen SoundScan confirmed that with nearly nine million copies sold. Bob Seger's Greatest Hits was the decade's best-selling catalog album in the United States, even out-selling the Beatles' 1 and Michael Jackson's Number Ones. By September 2011, the album had sold a total of 9,062,000 copies in the United States.

== Album art ==
Californian photographer, Karen Miller, took photos of the band as part of two photoshoots for the album. The most popular pictures out of the first photoshoot were the railroad track scenes taken on the Southern Pacific railroad tracks north of Mojave, California. The single picture of Seger holding his guitar became the cover photo. Another photograph of the entire band on the same tracks was used for the centerfold of the booklet that came with the It's a Mystery CD, released the following year.

Other photos on the album include pictures of Seger's newborn son, Cole. The back cover of Seger's son at a water pump was taken at Seger's home at the time in Miami, Florida. Cole was 17 months old at the time. The inside of the booklet includes photos of Silver Bullet Band members Craig Frost, Chris Campbell, and Alto Reed with their kids as well. Seger's manager, Punch Andrews, was skeptical about the idea of using the band's children as album art at first. However, Seger had seen it done before with other artists and insisted on the photographs being used on the final copy of the CD's insert.

== Track listing ==
All tracks are written by Bob Seger, except where noted.

No.	Title	Original album	Length
1.	"Roll Me Away"	The Distance	4:36
2.	"Night Moves"	Night Moves	5:25
3.	"Turn the Page" (live)	Live Bullet	5:03
4.	"You'll Accomp'ny Me"	Against the Wind	3:59
5.	"Hollywood Nights"	Stranger in Town	4:59
6.	"Still the Same"	Stranger in Town	3:19
7.	"Old Time Rock and Roll" (George Jackson, Thomas Earl Jones III)	Stranger in Town	3:12
8.	"We've Got Tonite"	Stranger in Town	4:38
9.	"Against the Wind"	Against the Wind	5:32
10.	"Mainstreet"	Night Moves	3:42
11.	"The Fire Inside"	The Fire Inside	5:53
12.	"Like a Rock"	Like a Rock	5:53
13.	"C'est la Vie" (Chuck Berry)	previously unreleased	2:58
14.	"In Your Time"	previously unreleased	3:05

== Personnel ==
As listed in liner notes.

Track 1
- Roy Bittan – piano
- Michael Boddicker – synthesizer
- Chris Campbell – bass guitar
- Craig Frost – organ
- Bobbye Hall – percussion
- Russ Kunkel – drums
- Bob Seger – lead vocals
- Waddy Wachtel – guitar
Track 2
- Chris Campbell – bass guitar
- Charlie Allen Martin – drums
- Joe Miquelon – electric guitar
- Doug Riley – piano, organ
- Bob Seger – lead vocals, acoustic guitar
- Rhonda Silver – background vocals
- Laurel Ward – background vocals
- Sharon Lee Williams – background vocals
Track 3
- Drew Abbott – guitar
- Chris Campbell – bass guitar
- Charlie Allen Martin – drums
- Alto Reed – saxophone
- Robyn Robbins – Mellotron
- Bob Seger – lead vocals, electric piano
Track 4
- Ginger Blake – background vocals
- Chris Campbell – bass guitar
- Sam Clayton – percussion
- Laura Creamer – background vocals
- Linda Dillard – background vocals
- Bill Payne – piano, organ, synthesizer
- Bob Seger – lead vocals, acoustic guitar
- David Teegarden – drums
Track 5
- Chris Campbell – bass guitar
- Bill Payne – piano, organ
- Bob Seger – lead vocals, guitar
- David Teegarden – drums, percussion
- Julia Waters, Luther Waters, Maxine Waters, Oren Waters – background vocals
Track 6
- Chris Campbell – bass guitar
- Venetta Fields – background vocals
- Clydie King – background vocals
- Sherlie Matthews – background vocals
- Robyn Robbins – organ
- Bob Seger – lead vocals, piano, acoustic guitar
- David Teegarden – drums, percussion
Track 7
- Ken Bell – guitar
- Stanley Carter – background vocals
- James Lavell Easley – background vocals
- Roger Hawkins – drums, percussion
- David Hood – bass guitar
- George Jackson – background vocals
- Randy McCormick – piano
- Howie McDonald – guitar solo
- Alto Reed – saxophone
- Bob Seger – lead vocals
Track 8
- Barry Beckett – keyboards
- Pete Carr – lead guitar
- Venetta Fields – background vocals
- Roger Hawkins – drums, percussion
- David Hood – bass guitar
- Jimmy Johnson – rhythm guitar
- Clydie King – background vocals
- Sherlie Matthews – background vocals
- Bob Seger – lead vocals

Strings conducted and arranged by Jim Ed Norman.

Track 9
- Drew Abbott – electric guitar
- Chris Campbell – bass guitar
- Glenn Frey – background vocals
- Paul Harris – piano, organ
- Bob Seger – lead vocals, background vocals, acoustic guitar
- David Teegarden – drums
Track 10
- Barry Beckett – keyboards
- Pete Carr – lead guitar, acoustic guitar
- Roger Hawkins – drums, percussion
- David Hood – bass guitar
- Jimmy Johnson – rhythm guitar
- Bob Seger – lead vocals
Track 11
- Roy Bittan – piano
- Bob Glaub – bass guitar
- Russ Kunkel – drums
- Steve Lukather – acoustic guitar
- Bob Seger – lead vocals
- Jai Winding – organ
Track 12
- Dawayne Bailey – acoustic guitar
- Chris Campbell – bass guitar
- Craig Frost – organ
- Douglas Kibble – background vocals
- Russ Kunkel – drums
- Bill Payne – piano
- Bob Seger – lead vocals
- Rick Vito – slide guitar
- The Weather Girls (Izora Armstead and Martha Wash) – background vocals
Track 13
- Chris Campbell – bass guitar
- Craig Frost – piano
- Alto Reed – saxophone
- Jimmy Romeo – saxophone
- Bob Seger – vocals, guitar
- Crystal Taliefero – saxophone
- Tomo Thomas – saxophone
- David Teegarden – drums
Track 14
- Rosemary Butler – background vocals
- Chris Campbell – bass guitar
- Laura Creamer – background vocals
- Donny Gerrard – background vocals
- Russ Kunkel – drums, percussion
- Tim Mitchell – electric guitar
- Shaun Murphy – background vocals
- Alto Reed – saxophone
- Bob Seger – lead vocals, acoustic guitar, piano, synthesizer

== Charts ==
=== Weekly charts ===
1994 weekly chart performance for Greatest Hits
Chart (1994)	Peak position
Canada Top Albums/CDs (RPM)	4
German Albums (Offizielle Top 100)	49
New Zealand Albums (RMNZ)	4
Swiss Albums (Schweizer Hitparade)	46
US Billboard 200	8

1995 weekly chart performance for Greatest Hits
Chart (1995)	Peak position
Australian Albums (ARIA)	5
UK Albums (Official Charts)	6

2003 weekly chart performance for Greatest Hits
Chart (2003)	Peak position
US Top Catalog Albums (Billboard)	1

2019 weekly chart performance for Greatest Hits
Chart (2019)	Peak position
US Top Rock Albums (Billboard)	13

=== Year-end charts ===
Year-end chart performance for Greatest Hits
Chart (1994)	Position
Canada Top Albums/CDs (RPM)	53
Chart (1995)	Position
Canada Top Albums/CDs (RPM)	88
US Billboard 200	22
Chart (1996)	Position
US Billboard 200	94
Chart (2018)	Position
US Billboard 200	153
US Top Rock Albums (Billboard)	22
Chart (2019)	Position
US Billboard 200	121
US Top Rock Albums (Billboard)	20
Chart (2020)	Position
US Billboard 200	138
US Top Rock Albums (Billboard)	14
Chart (2021)	Position
US Billboard 200	125
US Top Rock Albums (Billboard)	17
Chart (2022)	Position
US Billboard 200	117
US Top Rock Albums (Billboard)	24
Chart (2023)	Position
US Billboard 200	145
US Top Rock Albums (Billboard)	24
Chart (2024)	Position
US Billboard 200	143

== Certifications ==
Certifications for Greatest Hits
Region	Certification	Certified units/sales
Australia (ARIA)	Platinum	70,000^{^}
Canada (Music Canada)	3× Platinum	300,000^{^}
United Kingdom (BPI)	Gold	100,000^{^}
United States (RIAA)	Diamond	10,000,000^{‡}
^{^} Shipments figures based on certification alone.^{‡} Sales+streaming figures based on certification alone.
