= The Bob Seger Collection =

Compilation album by Bob Seger
- Released: 1979
- Genre: Rock
- Label: Capitol (Australian Cat No. ST24812)

Bob Seger chronology
| Stranger in Town (1978) | The Bob Seger Collection (1979) | Against the Wind (1980) |

The Bob Seger Collection is a compilation album released in 1979, in Australia and New Zealand only.

== Track listing ==
=== Side one ===
1. "Night Moves"
2. "Mainstreet"
3. "Let It Rock" (studio version)
4. "Leaning on My Dream"
5. "Ship of Fools"
6. "Still the Same"

=== Side two ===
1. "Katmandu"
2. "Mongrel Too"
3. "Hollywood Nights"
4. "Travelin' Man"
5. "Get Out of Denver"
6. "We've Got Tonight"

== Charts ==
| Chart (1979) | Peak position |
|---|---|
| Australia (Kent Music Report) | 1 |
