= Logos and uniforms of the Los Angeles Lakers =

The logos and uniforms of the Los Angeles Lakers have gone through many changes throughout the history of the team.

== Logos ==
The logos below are in chronological order.

Los Angeles Lakers (2001–present)

== Uniforms ==
=== Minneapolis era ===
As the Minneapolis Lakers, their road uniform is powder blue with gold trim. It is notable that it featured the city name's abbreviation (MPLS) on their road uniforms; they later changed it to the team nickname in block lettering. Their home uniform is white with powder blue and gold trim, and features the team nickname. It was used from 1948 to 1958. The original MPLS uniforms were later used as throwback uniforms in the 2001–02 and 2017–18 seasons. The home white uniform from this era was brought back in the 2022–23 season in commemoration of the franchise's 75th anniversary.

In their final years in Minneapolis, the uniforms were tweaked, eliminating gold; the uniform featured four stars surrounding the front of the jersey. The shade of blue was changed to royal blue. During the 2004–05 season, the Lakers wore fauxback uniforms, featuring the uniform design worn in the final seasons in Minneapolis, but with the powder blue base of the George Mikan era.

=== Early Los Angeles era ===
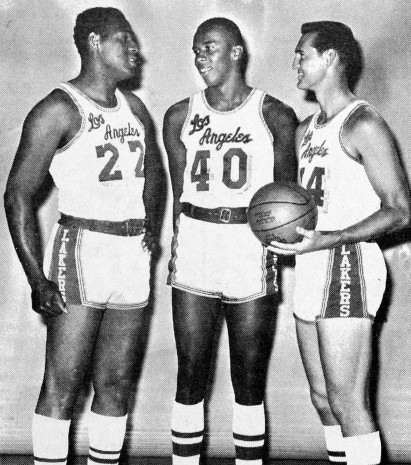
The Lakers' home white uniform from 1960 to 1967, as worn by Elgin Baylor, Jerry Chambers and Jerry West in 1966.

Upon moving to Los Angeles in 1960, they retained the blue and white scheme. The uniforms now feature a cursive 'Los Angeles' lettering. The road uniforms were royal blue with white and powder blue trim, while the home uniforms were white with royal and powder blue trim. The shorts feature the wordmark 'Lakers' on either side of the leg. The blue uniforms were used as throwbacks in the 1996–97, 2003–04 and 2020–21 seasons.

=== Switch to purple and gold ===
In 1967, Jack Kent Cooke purchased the Lakers and moved to The Forum. Cooke made some drastic changes to the Lakers' look by outfitting them in purple (known as Forum blue until the early 1980s) and gold uniforms.

==== 1967–78 ====
The initial purple and gold look featured a slanted "Lakers" script and white numbers with either gold or purple drop shadows. With a few changes in the striping scheme, this look would be used by the Lakers until the 1977–78 season.

The 1971–72 version of the gold uniforms were used as throwback uniforms in the 2010–11 season. However, this uniform featured sans-serif player names and a straight "Lakers" script, whereas the originals had serifed player names and a slanted "Lakers" script.

==== 1978–99 ====
The gold uniforms were overhauled prior to the 1978–79 season, switching from white numbers to purple numbers with white drop shadows. The new look was unveiled a year before Jerry Buss purchased the Lakers and Magic Johnson launched the Showtime era.

During the early 1980s, the Lakers wore mismatched shades of purple in their uniforms. On most occasions, the jersey was rendered in a darker shade whereas the shorts were lighter in hue and vice versa. This color issue was corrected later in the decade. Before the 1986–87 season, changes were made to the uniforms when the number font changed and decreased in size. The "Lakers" script also realigned into a straight arrangement.

The Lakers revived the "Showtime" gold uniforms as throwbacks during the 2007–08 and 2016–17 seasons. In a home game against the Boston Celtics on December 30, 2007, the Lakers wore short shorts to match their throwback uniforms in the first half before switching to the baggy-styled shorts in the second half.

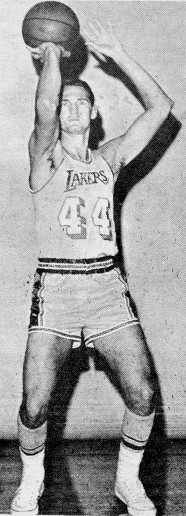
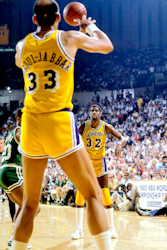
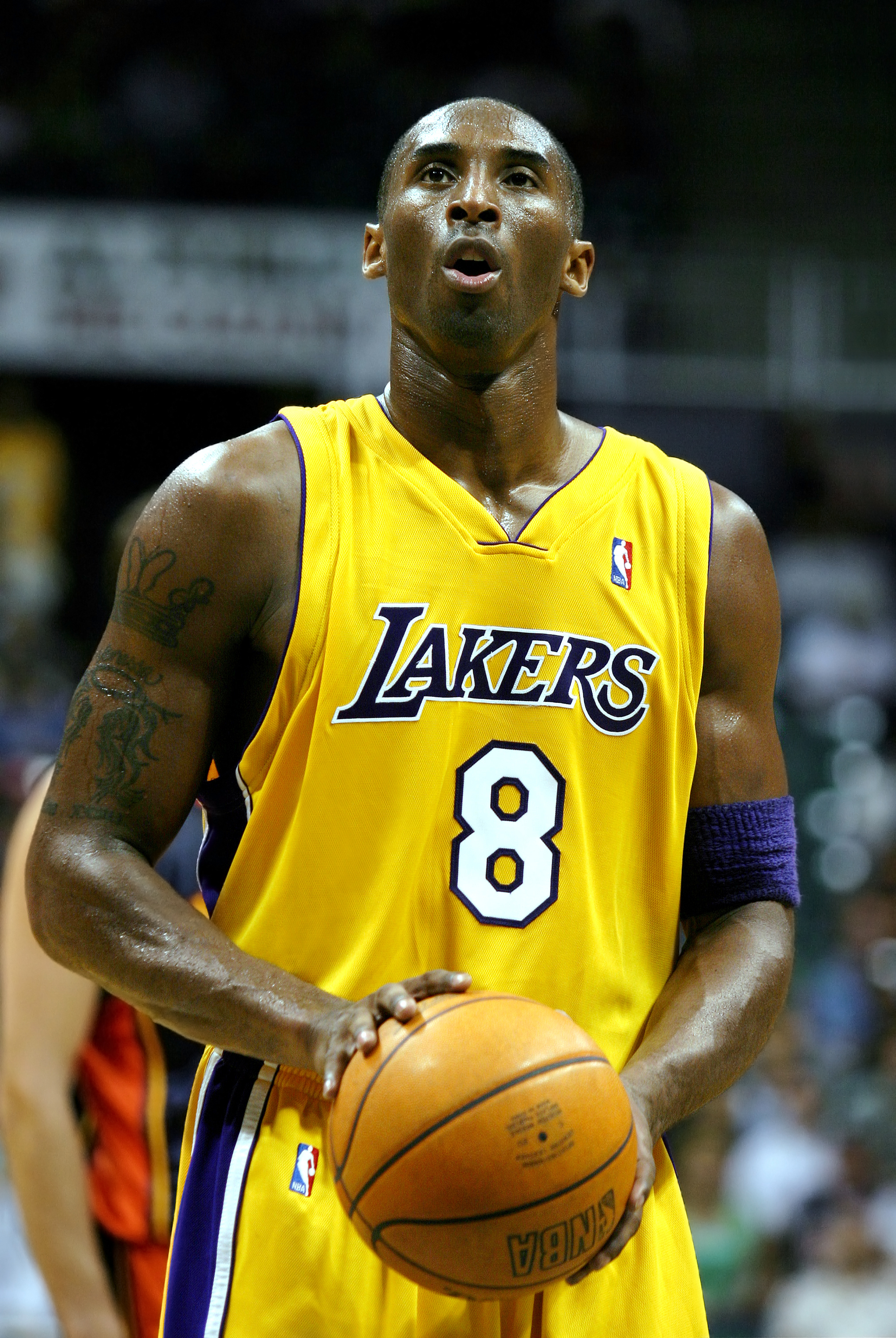
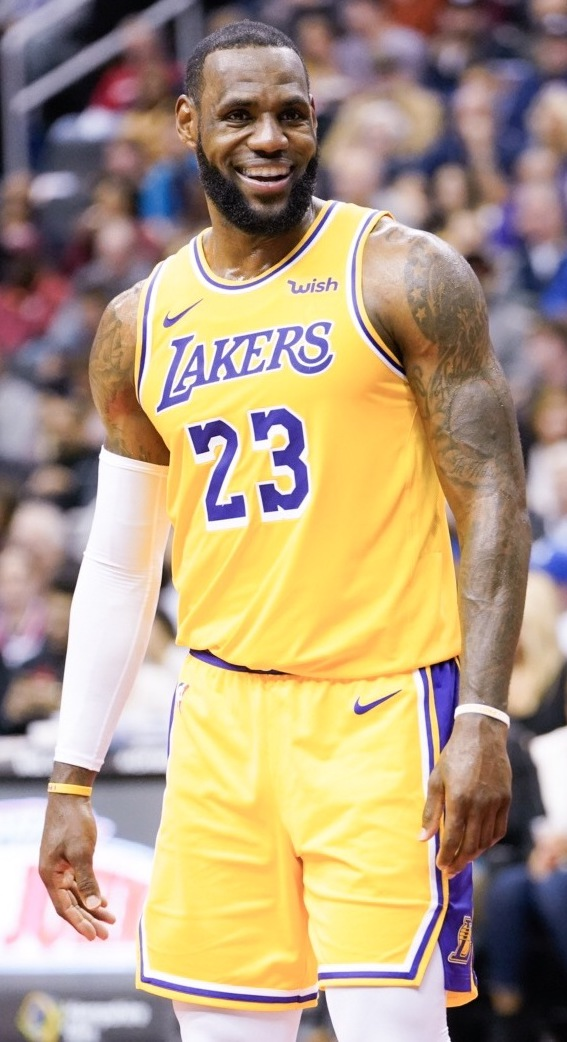
The Lakers' gold uniforms, as seen on (from left) Jerry West, Kareem Abdul-Jabbar, Magic Johnson, Kobe Bryant and LeBron James, has switched from white to purple numerals and drop shadows since its introduction in 1967.

==== 1999–2018 ====
Prior to the 1999–2000 season, the Lakers unveiled a new uniform set. The side stripes now extend towards the jersey, the drop shadows were removed, a modernized "Lakers" script was introduced, and white numbers returned to the gold uniform.

At the time of its unveiling, Nike served as the Lakers' uniform provider along with several other teams. The enduring feature of this uniform was the "wishbone" collar, which was also adopted by the Dallas Mavericks, Detroit Pistons, Miami Heat, and Toronto Raptors upon releasing their respective uniforms.

===== Alternate white uniform =====
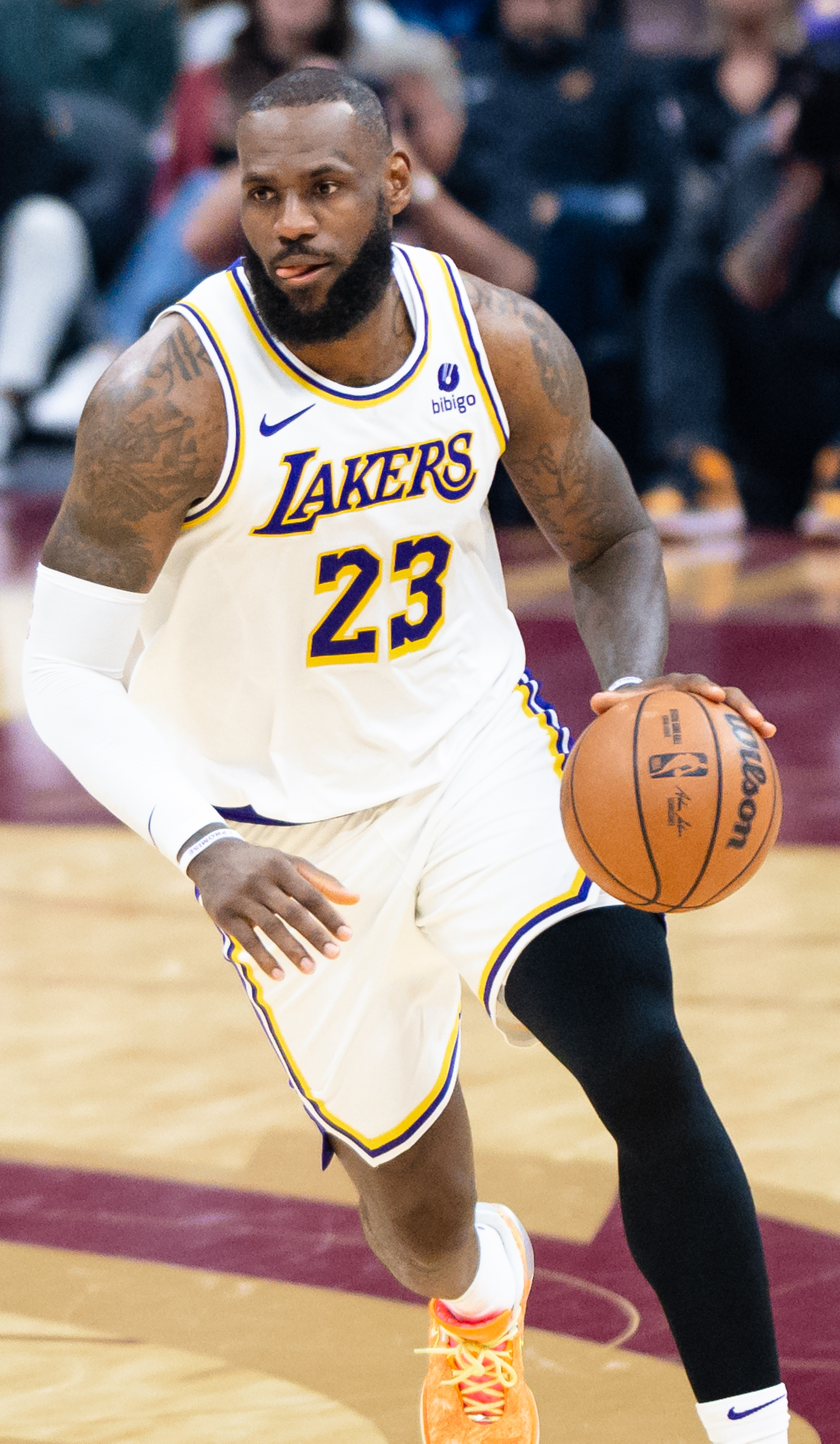
LeBron James in the white "Association" uniform.

In the 2002–03 season, the Lakers unveiled a white alternate uniform. The white jerseys were designed by Lakers owner Jerry Buss' daughter Jeanie Buss, in tribute to Chick Hearn, who was the voice of the team for 40 years until his death in August 2002.

Along with the unveiling of the white alternate uniform, the Lakers released a new alternate logo featuring the purple "L" outside a gold basketball. This logo was placed on the purple and gold uniforms prior to the 2004–05 season. The white jerseys were, for some time, only worn for Sunday home games.

===== Hollywood Nights black uniform =====
From the 2013–14 to the 2016–17 seasons, the Lakers wore a black uniform that was inspired from the Hollywood night life. Dubbed "Hollywood Nights", the uniform was black with purple and gold trim. They debuted the uniform on the road against the Brooklyn Nets on November 27, 2013, and were used for select Friday home dates. A variation of the "Hollywood Nights" jerseys, featuring sleeves, was unveiled for the 2014–15 season.

===== Special uniforms =====
From the 2007–08 to the 2016–17 seasons, the Lakers wore special edition white uniforms for NBA's Noche Latina events. The uniforms were similar to the Sunday whites, but with the wordmark "Los Lakers". During the 2013–14 season, the Lakers wore a sleeved version of the Noche Latina uniforms, with "Los Lakers" in gold with purple trim, and greyscale patterns at the back.

The Lakers wore special Christmas-themed uniforms as part of the NBA's Christmas games from 2012 to 2016. They wore the following one-off Christmas uniforms:

- 2012: Monochrome white uniforms with lettering in white with purple trim.
- 2013: Sleeved white uniforms with primary logo in chrome with purple accents.
- 2014: Modified home white uniforms with "L" alternate logo, purple numbers and purple nameplates.
- 2015: Cream uniforms with ornate lettering and numbers.
- 2016: Monochrome white uniforms with ornate lettering and numbers.

==== 2018–present ====
For the 2017–18 season, Nike took over the league's uniform contracts and the NBA did away with the "home" and "away" uniform designation. The Lakers white jersey became the team's "Association" jersey (named as such because every NBA team has a white jersey), the gold became the "Icon" jersey, and the purple became the "Statement" jersey that each team has.

Just before the 2018–19 season, the Lakers updated and unveiled their new uniforms. The side stripes were removed from the gold "Icon" and white "Association" uniform (the shorts retain this feature), while black side stripes with gold and white trim flank the purple "Statement" uniform.

In addition, drop shadows return to the uniform numbers for the first time since 1999. And in another first for the franchise, the Lakers will feature gold numbers with white drop shadows on the purple uniform, while the gold uniforms will return to purple numbers with white drop shadows.

Prior to the 2022–23 season, the Lakers made subtle changes to the purple "Statement" uniform. The uniform number was changed to black with gold side stripes, while adding black shoulder stripes and trim.

In the 2025–26 season, the Lakers again updated their purple "Statement" uniform, removing the black side panels and updating the letters in white with gold trim and drop shadows, marking the first time in franchise history that purple uniforms donned white letters. White numbers returned to jersey for the first time since 2018 and they would be accompanied with gold trim. The "LA" wordmark was also added on the shorts, marking the first time this would be used on a primary uniform.

==== City and Earned uniforms ====
Under Nike, two additional uniform sets were added: the "City" uniform that pays tribute to each team's local culture and heritage, and an "Earned" uniform as a reward for making the NBA playoffs the previous year.

===== 2017–2021: Lore Series =====
From 2017 to 2021, the Lakers' "City" uniforms were labeled as the "Lore Series" designed to honor its greatest players. In the 2017–18 season, their "City" uniform paid tribute to Kobe Bryant, featuring an all-black design with subtle snakeskin patterns, and black letters with gold trim. The modern "Lakers" wordmark was used, but the numbers featured Showtime-era drop shadows. This uniform was later brought back as part of the team's uniform rotation during the 2020 NBA playoffs, and in a 2023–24 regular season game which saw the unveiling of Bryant's statue outside Crypto.com Arena.

For 2018–19, the Lakers unveiled a new "Lore Series" uniform focusing on Magic Johnson. The design featured purple with subtle black pinstripes depicting the Lakers' five championships and Johnson's three MVP awards during the Showtime era. The black waistband featured Johnson's no. 32 superimposed over an "M" resembling the Lakers wordmark. The full team name is featured in front, again incorporating the modern "Lakers" wordmark in black trimmed in gold, along with black numbers with gold drop shadows

For the 2019–20 "Lore Series" uniform, the Lakers honored Shaquille O'Neal. The gold-based design featured both the "Lakers" wordmark and numbers in white with purple drop shadows, and incorporated three gold stars on each side to represent O'Neal's three championships with the team. Each star also contained a number representing a Lakers legend. The white borders featured a subtle "M.D.E." print as an allusion to O'Neal's "Most Dominant Ever" nickname, and waistband logo paid homage to Jerry Buss.

For the 2020–21 "Lore Series" uniform, the Lakers looked back in the past and honored Elgin Baylor in their first years in Los Angeles before switching to purple and gold. The white-based design incorporated the classic "Lakers" wordmark in powder blue, along with silver numbers featuring powder blue drop shadows.

===== 2021–22: Mixtape =====
In the 2021–22 season, the Lakers were one of 27 teams to wear "mix-tape" uniforms for the NBA's 75th anniversary special "City" series. This design featured a purple base, but with a few cues from past uniforms. The slanted "Lakers" wordmark and drop-shadowed numbers were taken from the 1967–86 uniforms, while powder blue trim and white stars represented the team's Minneapolis years. On the shorts, the full team name shaped into a triangle was a nod to the early 1960s logo, and the current "L" alternate logo on the waist was a nod to the Kobe Bryant era.

===== 2022–23: The Blank Canvas =====
The Lakers' 2022–23 "City" uniform did not honor any past team legend. According to the team, it stated that "the uniform is not the story, it is a vehicle to tell the stories behind the individual Changemakers around Los Angeles". The blank canvas was represented by a white base, with the city name in purple along with black numbers and purple drop shadows.

===== 2023–24 & 2025–27: California Dream =====
This "City" uniform, nicknamed the "California Dream", featured a black base, gold letters and purple numbers. It featured the 1960s-style triangular "Los Angeles" wordmark in serif block letters, along with "Lakers" at the bottom. The number style was reminiscent of the one used during the Kobe Bryant era from 1999 to 2017. Initially debuting in the 2023–24 season, the Lakers brought back the design in 2025 and wore them for another two seasons. The Lakers would also debut an alternate court specific to the 2023 NBA in-season tournament, featuring a gold-painted court with a middle purple strip along the free throw lanes. The silhouette of the NBA Cup was added on each end of the purple lanes, and the actual trophy was painted at center court along with the primary Lakers logo.

===== 2024–25: California Destiny =====
For the 2024–25 "City" uniform, the Lakers donned a black/purple gradient uniform nicknamed the "California Destiny", featuring the "Lake Show" wordmark in gold letters with purple numbers trimmed in gold with black drop shadows. They would also play on an alternate court for the first time (excluding NBA Cup-specific courts), featuring the "LA" symbol on the center circle and a black/purple gradient sideline and baseline area with "Lake Show" in gold.

===== 2021: Earned =====
Nike also releases an "Earned" uniform on occasion as a reward for making the NBA playoffs the previous season. The Lakers' 2020–21 version was similar to the "Hollywood Nights" alternates they wore from 2013 to 2017, though it was updated to the current Showtime-inspired design. They are also the only team whose "Earned" uniform featured a metallic gold Nike swoosh; this by virtue of winning the 2020 NBA Finals.

==== Notable uniform moments ====
Even though the Lakers have traditionally worn purple on the road, gold at home and more recently white on Sunday home games, there have been a few instances where the Lakers eschewed tradition.

During the 2007–08 season, the Lakers wore their classic gold uniforms for two away games: December 21 against the Philadelphia 76ers, and December 23 against the New York Knicks. The home team wore their white throwback uniforms. Similarly, they wore their 1971–72 gold uniforms for three away games: February 10, 2011 against the Celtics, February 11 against the Knicks, and February 13 against the Orlando Magic. With the exception of the Magic, the Lakers' opponents wore throwback uniforms for the occasion.

In recent years, the Lakers occasionally broke out their gold uniforms for a few away contests against teams that wore their dark primary, alternate or throwback uniforms. But after Nike became the league's outfitter for 2017 and beyond, the Lakers were forced to use only their gold "Icon" and white "Association" uniforms on either home or away games for the first two months of the season, after which the purple "Statement" uniforms were added to the rotation.

In another break from tradition, the Lakers wore their purple "Statement" uniforms for the first time in a home game on November 29, 2017, against the Golden State Warriors.

Halfway through the 2019-20 NBA season, Kobe Bryant, was one of the victims of the 2020 Calabasas helicopter crash along with his 13-year-old daughter Gianna, six other passengers, and the pilot. In honor of his legacy, a patch of his initials was placed above the Nike swoosh logo. Also, the patch is placed on the back ends of the Lakers' homecourt, and Kobe's numbers on the sidelines, with his #8 near the Lakers bench, and his #24 near the visiting team's bench. Upon entering the 2020 NBA playoffs, the Lakers decided to wear "Black Mamba" jerseys that were used in the 2017-18 Los Angeles Lakers season, first used in Game 4 of the First Round against Portland Trail Blazers, which was exactly one day after what would have been Kobe's 42nd birthday. The team also announced that if the Lakers will advance to the next round, it will be included to the team's jersey rotation. The jersey included the number 2 jersey of Kobe's daughter Gianna above the Nike swoosh in a white heart shape. The Lakers again wore the "Black Mamba" jerseys on February 8, 2024, against the Denver Nuggets, this time in honor of Bryant's statue unveiling at Crypto.com Arena.

On February 1, 2025, the Lakers ditched the purple/black gradient "California Destiny" jersey in favor of the purple "Statement" jersey ahead of a road game against the New York Knicks. Entering the game, the Lakers had only won once in ten games while wearing the "City" uniform. The uniform switch worked as the Lakers won 128–112. After the game, the Lakers ceased wearing the "City" jersey despite having seven more games assigned to it, and would wear either the purple "Statement" or gold "Icon" jerseys in these games instead.
