= Feel Like a Number =

Bob Seger song

Single by Bob Seger & The Silver Bullet Band

from the album Stranger in Town
- A-side: "Still the Same"
- Released: 1978
- Genre: Rock and roll
- Length: 3:42
- Label: Capitol
- Songwriter: Bob Seger
- Producers: Bob Seger; Punch Andrews

"Feel Like a Number"

Single by Bob Seger & The Silver Bullet Band

from the album Nine Tonight
- B-side: "Hollywood Nights"
- Released: 1981
- Genre: Rock
- Length: 4:02
- Label: Capitol
- Songwriter: Bob Seger
- Producers: Bob Seger; Punch Andrews

Bob Seger & The Silver Bullet Band singles chronology
"Tryin' to Live My Life Without You" (1981)	"Feel Like a Number" (1981)	"Shame on the Moon" (1982)

"Feel Like a Number" is a song written by Bob Seger that was first released on his 1978 album with the Silver Bullet Band, Stranger in Town. It was also released as the B-side of the top 5 single "Still the Same" and a live version from the album Nine Tonight was released as a single in 1981. The song was featured in the 1981 movie Body Heat.

== Lyrics and music ==
Ultimate Classic Rock critic Jim Allen describes "Feel Like a Number" as a "rough-hewn proletarian anthem." Similarly, Billboard critic Ed Harrison described the song as "anthem-like," a "spirited rocker" and as a "working class dirge...that sums up the complaints of the working class." The lyrics are sung by an ordinary worker who feels devalued, unrecognized and unappreciated by modern, impersonal society. He feels like his coworkers to be "just another drone," the telephone company considers him "just another phone," and the Internal Revenue Service considers him just "another file." At the end of the song, the singer desperately declares that "I ain't just a number/Dammit, I'm a man!" According to radio hosts Pete Forntale and Bill Ayres. "With the IRS you certainly are just a number, and that's alright, as long as they don't call your number. If you feel that way at work, however, you have a problem." Allen Baswell regarded "Feel Like a Number" as an example of Seger's "rich lyrics" describing "the hopes, dignity and dreams of working people." According to Seger (in 1978):

I got the idea for the song after watching a show about computer banks and how many names were in them. We're all in computer banks. Lord knows how many data collections there are. Everybody is a number and in the record industry you're also thought of a lot of times as a number — the amount you sell or whatever. Some of the humanity gets lost and the hype takes over. You have to watch out. That's the whole idea of Stranger in Town as an album, actually. It's about identity and trying to survive and keep your identity.

Seger also said of the song:

I was real proud of that one. I was an auto worker for a brief time. I worked for six months making GM transmissions in Ypsilanti, Michigan. I lasted six months there loading conveyors. Then I worked at another plant on an assembly line putting rubber around windshields. Which is not good for a guitar player, so I didn’t do that for very long. I think I only lasted a month there. But I was there long enough to get it into my head that you can become just a number, you’re just a statistic; you’re not really a person, you’re just a cog in a very gigantic wheel. And it felt very uncomfortable to feel that way about myself. I tried to convey that in the song.

According to Allmusic critic Mark Deming, Seger's "pained, angry, and defiant" vocal makes the song special. He describes the Silver Bullet Band as providing "a tough wall of guitar and keyboard driven rock" to support Seger's vocal.

== Reception ==
Deming feels that the song "could well have been the anthem of the Regular Joes who'd stuck by Seger during his lean years." Forntale and Ayres feel the song "paints a powerful picture" of the unappreciated man. Boston Globe contributor Steve Morse called it a "powerful rocker" and considered "Feel Like a Number" to be the key song from the Stranger in Town album, as well as the key to understanding Seger's "feet–on–the–ground roots." Cash Box said that "Feel Like a Number" is "what Seger is all about."

A live version of "Feel Like a Number" was included on Seger's 1981 live album Nine Tonight. This version was released as a single and reached #48 on the Billboard Hot 100. It performed better in Canada, reaching #29. Billboard said of it that "Seger's gritty vocal and some searing guitar work standout." Record World described it as a "non-stop rocker" with "boogie piano rolls" and "guitar raunch."

The original studio version also appears in the ski instructor tryouts scene in the 1993 film Aspen Extreme.

In 2024 Ultimate Classic Rock critic Allison Rapp rated "Feel Life a Number" to be rock music's 20th best work song. Fellow Ultimate Classic Rock critic Matt Wardlaw called it "one of rock's best songs about punching the clock" and noted that unlike many rock stars who sang about working life, Seger actually had blue collar working experience. According to Ultimate Classic Rock contributor Jeff Giles, even though "Feel Like a Number" was not a hit single, it "has its own special place in the hearts of longtime fans who appreciate Seger's distinctive way of giving musical life to the hopes, dreams and struggles of the American middle class." AnnArbor.com director Bob Needham described "Feel Like a Number" as a "terrific expression of working-class frustration," noting that although not a hit single it was a radio staple.

== Reprises ==
Sung in French by Johnny Hallyday in 1980 under the title of "Perdu dans le nombre" from the album À partir de maintenant.
