= Nine Tonight =

Live album by Bob Seger & the Silver Bullet Band
- Released: September 8, 1981 (Charted September 26)
- Recorded: Cobo Hall, Detroit, Michigan–June 15–21, 1980 and Boston Garden, Boston, Massachusetts–October 5–7, 1980 Recorded by David Hewitt on the Record Plant NY Black Truck
- Genre: Rock
- Length: 67:21 (CD); 80:00 (Original vinyl)
- Label: Capitol
- Producers: Punch Andrews, Bob Seger

Bob Seger & the Silver Bullet Band chronology
Against the Wind (1980)	Nine Tonight (1981)	The Distance (1982)

Singles from Nine Tonight
- 1. "Tryin' to Live My Life Without You" Released: August 1981; 2. "Feel Like a Number" Released: December 1981

Professional ratings
Review scores
Source	Rating
AllMusic	3/5 stars
Record Mirror	4/5 stars

Nine Tonight is a live album by American rock band Bob Seger & the Silver Bullet Band, released in 1981 (see 1981 in music). The album was recorded at Cobo Hall in Detroit, Michigan, in June 1980 and at the Boston Garden in Boston, Massachusetts in October 1980. With the exception of three tracks — "Nine Tonight", "Tryin' To Live My Life Without You" and "Let It Rock" — the album is composed of songs drawn from Seger's three previous studio albums. Only "Let It Rock" was repeated from the previous live album Live Bullet. "Tryin' to Live My Life Without You" was released as a single and peaked at number five on the Billboard Hot 100 in the US. The album's title track was originally recorded for the Urban Cowboy soundtrack album.

The 2011 remastered album has a bonus track called "Brave Strangers", which was originally released on Seger's 1978 album Stranger in Town. This live version was originally released as the B-side of the "Tryin' to Live My Life Without You" live single.

== Track listing ==
All tracks are written by Bob Seger, except where noted.

No.	Title	Writer(s)	Length
1.	"Nine Tonight"		5:23
2.	"Tryin' to Live My Life Without You"	Eugene Williams	4:00
3.	"You'll Accomp'ny Me"		4:13
4.	"Hollywood Nights"		4:49
5.	"Old Time Rock & Roll"	George Jackson, Thomas Earl Jones III	5:12
6.	"Mainstreet"		4:04
7.	"Against the Wind"		5:35
8.	"The Fire Down Below"		4:47
9.	"Her Strut"		3:51
10.	"Feel Like a Number"		4:10
11.	"Fire Lake"		3:52
12.	"Betty Lou's Gettin' Out Tonight"		2:59
13.	"We've Got Tonight"		4:55
14.	"Night Moves"		5:44
15.	"Rock and Roll Never Forgets"		3:36
16.	"Let It Rock" (edited for CD - original LP version was 10:30)	E. Anderson (Chuck Berry)	5:58
17.	"Brave Strangers" (bonus track)		6:48

Track times based upon 2011 remaster.

Tracks recorded in Detroit on 15 June 1980: 8 & 17

Tracks recorded in Detroit on 16 June 1980: 4 & 12

Tracks recorded in Detroit on 19 June 1980: 7 & 10

Tracks recorded in Detroit on 20 June 1980: 11 & 14

Tracks recorded in Detroit on 21 June 1980: 13

Tracks recorded in Boston on 5 October 1980: 5 & 9

Tracks recorded in Boston on 6 October 1980: 1 & 2

Tracks recorded in Boston on 7 October 1980: 3, 6, 15 & 16

== Personnel ==
- Bob Seger - acoustic guitar, piano, electric guitar, vocals
- Drew Abbott - electric guitar, acoustic guitar
- Colleen Beaton - vocals
- Chris Campbell - bass, background vocals
- Craig Frost - organ, piano, keyboard, clavinet
- Kathy Lamb - vocals
- Pamela Moore - vocals
- Shaun Murphy - percussion, vocals, background vocals, harmony vocals
- Alto Reed - organ, flute, horn, alto saxophone, tenor saxophone
- David Teegarden - drums, background vocals
- June Tilton - vocals

== Charts ==
=== Weekly charts ===
Chart (1981)	Peak position
Canada Top Albums/CDs (RPM)	6
German Albums (Offizielle Top 100)	34
New Zealand Albums (RMNZ)	37
UK Albums (Official Charts)	24
US Billboard 200	3

=== Year-end charts ===
Chart (1981)	Position
Canada Top Albums/CDs (RPM)	25
Chart (1982)	Position
US Billboard 200	68

=== Singles ===
Single	Chart (1981)	Peak Position
"Tryin' to Live My Life Without You" (Live)	Canada (RPM)	11
"Tryin' to Live My Life Without You" (Live)	US Cash Box Top 100	8
"Tryin' to Live My Life Without You" (Live)	US Billboard Top Rock Tracks	2
"Tryin' to Live My Life Without You" (Live)	US Billboard Hot 100	5
"Feel Like a Number" (Live)	Canada (RPM)	29
"Feel Like a Number" (Live)	US Cash Box Top 100	54
"Feel Like a Number" (Live)	US Billboard Hot 100	48
"Hollywood Nights" (Live)	UK Singles Chart	49
"We've Got Tonight" (Live)	UK Singles Chart	60

== Certifications ==
Region	Certification	Certified units/sales
Canada (Music Canada)	Platinum	100,000^{^}
United States (RIAA)	4× Platinum	4,000,000^{^}
^{^} Shipments figures based on certification alone.
