= It's a Mystery =

Album by Bob Seger

Studio album by Bob Seger & The Silver Bullet Band
- Released: October 24, 1995
- Studios: New River Studios (Fort Lauderdale, FL); South Beach Studios (Miami Beach, FL); Woodland Digital (Nashville, TN); Conway Studios (Los Angeles, CA)
- Genre: Rock
- Length: 49:49
- Label: Capitol
- Producer: Bob Seger

Bob Seger & The Silver Bullet Band chronology
Greatest Hits (1994)	It's a Mystery (1995)	Greatest Hits 2 (2003)

Professional ratings
Review scores
Source	Rating
AllMusic	3/5 stars

It's a Mystery is the fifteenth studio album by American singer-songwriter Bob Seger, released in 1995 (see 1995 in music). As with his prior album, it is credited to the Silver Bullet Band, though many of the tracks feature a wide array of session musicians and the members of the Silver Bullet Band itself only make limited contributions to the album.

Despite hit singles and fan favorites such as "Lock and Load," "Manhattan," and "Hands in the Air," the album charted at No. 27 on the Billboard charts. This was Seger's lowest chart position since 1976's Live Bullet which charted at No. 34 on the Billboard 200.

It's a Mystery was Seger's last album before taking a hiatus from the music industry to be with his family. He would return in 2006 with the album Face the Promise.

== Track listing ==
All tracks are written by Bob Seger, except where noted.

No.	Title	Writer(s)	Length
1.	"Rite of Passage"		3:51
2.	"Lock and Load"	Craig Frost, Tim Mitchell, Seger	4:55
3.	"By the River"		3:26
4.	"Manhattan"		5:22
5.	"I Wonder"		4:06
6.	"It's a Mystery"		4:18
7.	"Revisionism Street"	Frost, Mitchell, Seger	3:48
8.	"Golden Boy"		2:25
9.	"I Can't Save You Angeline"		3:56
10.	"16 Shells from a Thirty-Ought Six"	Tom Waits	4:20
11.	"West of the Moon"		4:37
12.	"Hands in the Air"	Frost, Mitchell, Seger	4:45

== Personnel ==
As listed in the liner notes.

- Bob Seger – synthesizer (1, 8), acoustic guitar (3, 8), guitar (1), piano (9, 11), bass (1), vocals (all tracks), drum machine (1, 8)
- Kenny Aronoff – drums (6)
- Eddie Bayers – drums (2)
- Roy Bittan – piano (3–5)
- George Bohanon – trombone (10)
- Rosemary Butler – background vocals (1–3, 5, 9)
- Chris Campbell – bass (2, 6, 7, 12)
- Sam Clayton – maracas (7)
- Scott Crago – bass drum (6)
- Laura Creamer – background vocals (1–3, 5, 6, 9)
- Craig Frost – synthesizer (6), keyboards (2, 12), electric piano (7), drum machine (7, 12)
- Donny Gerrard – background vocals (1, 3, 5, 6, 9)
- Bob Glaub – bass (3–5, 9, 11)
- Richie Hayward – drums (10)
- Russ Kunkel – drums (9, 11)
- Gary Mallaber – brushed snare drum (10)
- Tim Mitchell – guitar (2, 6, 7, 9, 12)
- Shaun Murphy – background vocals (1, 2, 6, 9)
- Buell Neidlinger – bass (10)
- Bill Payne – synthesizer (7)
- Alto Reed – saxophone (1–3, 7)
- Rudy Richman – percussion (10)
- Tom Roady – maracas (7, 12)
- Harry Stinson – drums (3–5)
- Fred Tackett – guitar (10)
- Michael Thompson – guitar (3–5, 11)
- Jeffrey C.J. Vanston – synthesizer (5, 11), keyboards (3, 4)
- Rick Vito – slide guitar (10)
- Julia Waters – background vocals (3, 5)
- Luther Waters – background vocals (2)
- Oren Waters – background vocals (6)

== Production ==
- Producer: Bob Seger
- Engineer: David N. Cole
- Mixing: David N. Cole
- Drum programming: Bob Seger

== Charts ==
=== Weekly charts ===
Chart (1995–1996)	Peak position
Canada Top Albums/CDs (RPM)	53
Scottish Albums (Official Charts)	79
UK Albums (Official Charts)	76
US Billboard 200	27

=== Year-end charts ===
Chart (1996)	Position
US Billboard 200	184

=== Singles ===
Year	Single	Chart	Position
1995	"Lock and Load"	Mainstream Rock Tracks	22
1996	"Hands in the Air"	Mainstream Rock Tracks	29
