= Lookin' Back =

1970 song by Bob Seger

- French release picture sleeve

Single by Bob Seger
- A-side: "Lookin' Back"
- B-side: "Highway Child"
- Released: September 1971
- Recorded: 1970
- Studio: GM Studios, East Detroit, Michigan
- Genre: Rock
- Length: 2:43
- Label: Capitol
- Songwriter: Bob Seger
- Producer: Punch Andrews (Hideout Productions)

Bob Seger singles chronology
"Lucifer" (1970)	"Lookin' Back" (1971)	"Midnight Rider" (1972)

"Lookin' Back"

Song by Bob Seger & The Silver Bullet Band

from the album Live Bullet
- Released: April, 1976
- Recorded: September 1975; Cobo Hall, Detroit, Michigan
- Genre: Rock
- Length: 2:37
- Label: Capitol
- Songwriter: Bob Seger

"Lookin' Back" is a song written by Bob Seger, originally released as a non-album single in September 1971.

As with previous single "2 + 2 = ?", "Lookin' Back" was a criticism of political conservatism, chiding conservatives for not being open to new ideas. The song was originally recorded as part of Seger's 1970 album, Mongrel, but cut from the final release.

The single was a moderate success, reaching #96 on the US charts and #3 on the Detroit charts. A live version of the song was included on Seger's 1976 live album, Live Bullet.

== Track listing ==
1. "Lookin' Back" – 2:43
2. "Highway Child" – 2:49
