= Still the Same (Bob Seger song) =

Single by Bob Seger & The Silver Bullet Band

from the album Stranger in Town
- B-side: "Feel Like a Number"
- Released: April 1978
- Genre: Soft rock
- Length: 3:18
- Label: Capitol
- Songwriter: Bob Seger
- Producers: Bob Seger, Punch Andrews

Bob Seger & The Silver Bullet Band singles chronology
"Rock and Roll Never Forgets" (1977)	"Still the Same" (1978)	"Hollywood Nights" (1978)

"Still the Same" is a 1978 song written and recorded by the American singer Bob Seger. It hit No. 4 on the U.S. Billboard Hot 100 chart and was an international hit.

The song was covered by Bonnie Guitar on her 1987 album What Can I Say. This version was a country hit in 1989, reaching No. 79 on the Billboard US Country chart.

== Lyrics and music ==
"Still the Same" is a midtempo ballad that begins with what Billboard describes as a "catchy piano" part. According to Billboard contributor Ed Harrison, the harmony vocals by Venetta Fields, Clydie King and Sherlie Matthews give the song an R&B flavor.

The lyrics describe a gambler who the singer admired but in the end walks away from because he will not change. Seger has said that he has been asked for years who the song is about, and that it is actually an amalgamation of characters he met when he first went to Hollywood.

== Personnel ==
Credits are adapted from the liner notes of Seger's 1994 Greatest Hits compilation.

The Silver Bullet Band

- Bob Seger – lead vocals, piano, acoustic guitar
- Robyn Robbins – organ
- Chris Campbell – bass
- David Teegarden – drums, percussion

Additional musicians

- Venetta Fields – background vocals
- Clydie King – background vocals
- Sherlie Matthews – background vocals

== Reception ==
Billboard contributor Ed Harrison regarded "Still the Same" as the most "striking" song on Stranger in Town. Cash Box said that "the sit-up beat, acoustic guitar work and starkly melodic piano passages have a driving presence." Cash Box also said that the hook is "irresistible." Record World described it as "a melancholy, mid-tempo rocker in the introspective style that helped Seger connect up with a large audience."

== Charts ==
=== Weekly charts ===
Chart (1978)	Peak position
Australia (Kent Music Report)	23
Austrian Singles Chart	18
Belgium (VRT Top 30 Flanders)	22
Canadian RPM Top Singles	4
Dutch Singles Chart	13
German Singles Chart	30
New Zealand (RIANZ)	20
US Adult Contemporary (Billboard)	27
US Billboard Hot 100	4
U.S. Cash Box Top 100	4

=== Year-end charts ===
Chart (1978)	Rank
Australia	122
Canada	41
U.S. Billboard Hot 100	52
U.S. Cash Box	52

== Certifications ==
Region	Certification	Certified units/sales
New Zealand (RMNZ)	Platinum	30,000^{‡}
United States (RIAA)	Gold	500,000^{‡}
^{‡} Sales+streaming figures based on certification alone.
