= East Side Story (Bob Seger song) =

Single by Bob Seger & The Last Heard
- B-side: "East Side Sound"
- Released: June 1966
- Genre: Rock
- Length: 2:28
- Label: Hideout; Cameo-Parkway
- Songwriter: Bob Seger
- Producers: Bob Seger; Doug Brown

Bob Seger & The Last Heard singles chronology
"East Side Story" (1966)	"Persecution Smith" (1966)

"East Side Story" is an early Bob Seger single. It was Seger's first single with his group The Last Heard, marking his departure from Doug Brown and the Omens and the beginning of his own career. The song reached #3 on the Detroit charts.

== History ==
Seger had originally written the song for a local Detroit band called the Underdogs, managed by Edward "Punch" Andrews along with Seger. Andrews was looking for a song for the Underdogs to follow up their successful "Man in the Glass", so Doug Brown and Seger each wrote a song. Seger recalls: "They liked what I wrote, which was 'East Side Story.' But they didn't like the way the Underdogs did it. So we recorded it ourselves, and then Doug and I went our own ways. I started my own band." Members of both the Omens and Seger's own Town Criers played on the studio version. The single, which cost $1,200 to make, sold 50,000 copies. Seger made his television debut performing this song on the show Swingin' Time, hosted by Robin Seymour.
