= Drew Abbott =

American guitarist (born 1947)

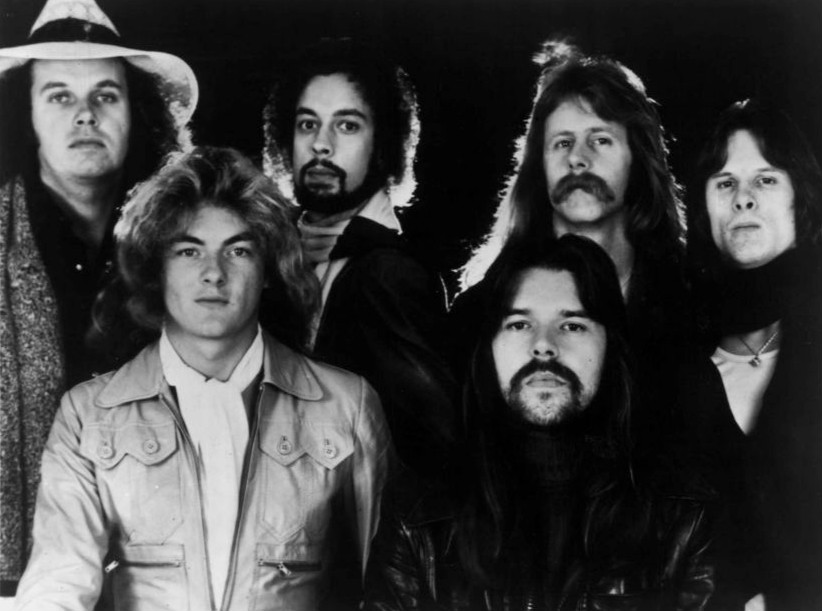
Drew Abbott (first from left) as part of the Silver Bullet Band in 1977

Drew Abbott (born January 13, 1947) is an American guitarist, who is best known for playing in Bob Seger's Silver Bullet Band, and appears on Bob Seger's Seven (1974), Beautiful Loser (1975), Live Bullet (1976), Night Moves (1976), Stranger in Town (1978), Against the Wind (1980), Nine Tonight (1981), and The Distance (1982). Prior to working with Seger, Abbott played in Detroit-based power trio Third Power.

In 1983 he left the Silver Bullet Band during "The Distance" era because he did not like Seger's use of session musicians. Abbott relocated to Traverse City, Michigan where he formed the band Burning Circle with pianist Tim Sparling and former Savage Grace vocalist Al Jacquez. He currently plays in the Michigan-based band Leo Creek.
