= Tryin' to Live My Life Without You =

1972 song by Otis Clay

"Trying to Live My Life Without You"
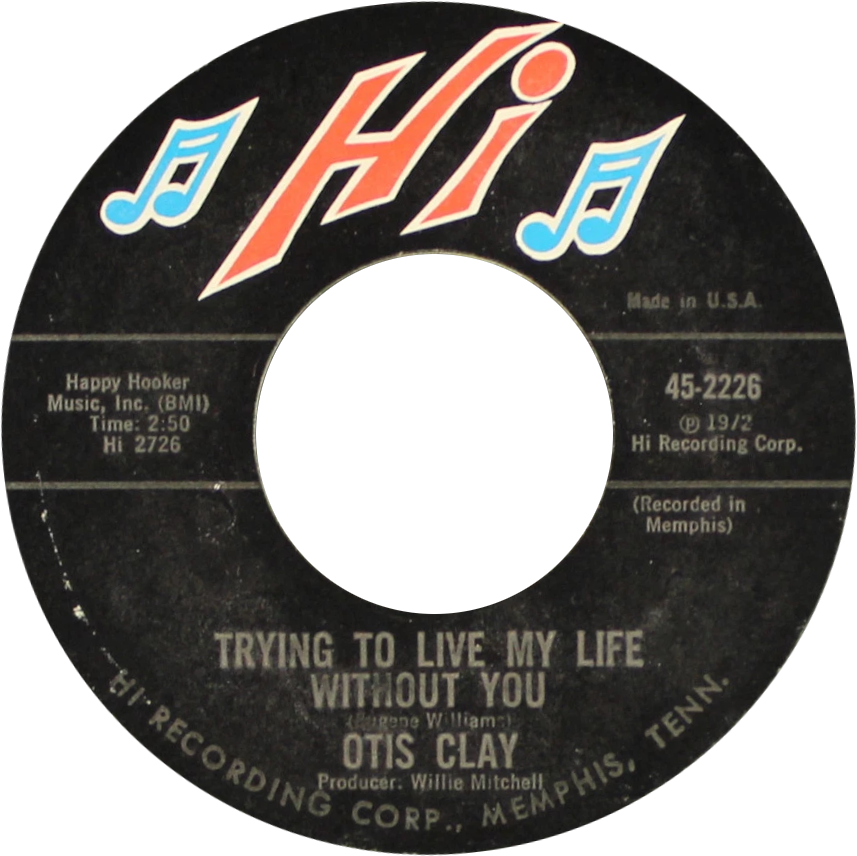
- One of side-A labels of the US single

Single by Otis Clay

from the album Trying to Live My Life Without You
- B-side: "Let Me Be the One"
- Released: December 1972
- Genre: R&B
- Length: 2:50
- Label: Hi
- Songwriter: Eugene Williams

"Trying to Live My Life Without You" or "Tryin' to Live My Life Without You" is a song written by Eugene Frank Williams, originally popularized by soul singer Otis Clay. In early 1973 it reached #102 on the Billboard Bubbling Under chart. On February 17, 1973, Clay performed the song on Soul Train. It has since been covered by several other artists, most notably Bob Seger on his 1981 Nine Tonight album, Dr. Feelgood on their 1982 Fast Women & Slow Horses album, Brinsley Schwarz and at live performances by The California Honeydrops. Two lines are used by Drake in "Moth Balls" from Some Sexy Songs 4 U.

== Writing ==
The song is sung from the point of view of a man who is addressing his former lover. During the song's verses, the narrator tells of various habits he has had over his lifetime, such as smoking "five packs of cigarettes a day", drinking "four or five bottles of wine", and womanizing with many young women. In the song, he states that breaking those former habits was difficult, but not nearly as difficult as getting over the girl and forgetting the love they shared.

== Chart performance ==
| Chart (1973) | Peak position |
|---|---|
| U.S. Billboard | 102 |
| U.S. Billboard Hot Soul Singles | 24 |
| U.S. Cash Box Top 100 | 70 |

== Bob Seger version ==
"Tryin' to Live My Life Without You"

Single by Bob Seger & the Silver Bullet Band

from the album Nine Tonight
- B-side: "Brave Strangers (Live)"
- Released: August 25, 1981
- Recorded: October 6, 1980
- Genre: Rock
- Length: 4:04
- Label: Capitol
- Songwriter: Eugene Williams
- Producers: Bob Seger, Punch Andrews

Bob Seger & the Silver Bullet Band singles chronology
| "The Horizontal Bop" (1981) | "Tryin' to Live My Life Without You" (1981) | "Feel Like a Number" (1981) |

Audio
- "Tryin' to Live My Life Without You" on YouTube

Bob Seger's cover of the song is the most successful version of the song, reaching number five on the pop singles charts. It is known for Seger's spoken prelude on top of the bassline: "Alright, you guys feel funky tonight? ... This is an old Memphis song, old Memphis song...." The Nine Tonight liner notes claim that Seger's saxophone player, Alto Reed, played all the saxophones heard on that song, at the same time. Most likely this is possible from studio overdubbing on top of the live performance.

Record World said it is a "soulful rocker that captures Seger at his best."

== Chart performance ==
=== Weekly charts ===
| Chart (1981–1982) | Peak position |
|---|---|
| Canada Top Singles (RPM) | 11 |
| US Billboard Hot 100 | 5 |
| US Mainstream Rock (Billboard) | 2 |
| U.S. Cash Box Top 100 | 8 |

=== Year-end charts ===
| Chart (1981) | Rank |
|---|---|
| Canada | 66 |
| U.S. Cash Box | 81 |
