= Beautiful Loser (song) =

Single by Bob Seger

from the album Beautiful Loser
- B-side: "Fine Memory"
- Released: 1975
- Genre: Country rock
- Length: 3:26 (album); 3:14 (single edit)
- Label: Capitol
- Songwriter: Bob Seger
- Producers: Bob Seger; Muscle Shoals Rhythm Section

Bob Seger singles chronology
"U.M.C. (Upper Middle Class)" (1974)	"Beautiful Loser" (1975)	"Katmandu" (1975)

"Beautiful Loser" is a song written and recorded by American rock artist Bob Seger. It was the title track on his 1975 studio album Beautiful Loser. The single just missed inclusion on the US Top 100, but became more widely known when it was included on Seger's breakout album, 'Live' Bullet (1976), where it was paired with "Travelin' Man".

== Content ==
The song is about people who set their goals so low that they never achieve anything. Seger got the idea for the song from Beautiful Losers, a novel written by Leonard Cohen. Contrary to what many believed, the song is not about Seger himself. It took over a year to finish the song, and Seger wrote three or four versions of the song before settling on one that worked.

== Reception ==
Cash Box described it as "a country-rocker" with "super hot production and rhythm."

Classic Rock History critic Janey Roberts rated it as Seger's 5th best song.

== Chart performance ==
Chart (1975)	Peak position
U.S. Billboard Bubbling Under the Hot 100	3

== Covers ==
- Point Blank covered the song on Second Season (Arista) 1977.
- Jon English covered the song on his album, Beating the Boards (1982).
