= Night Moves (album) =

1976 studio album by Bob Seger & the Silver Bullet Band

Studio album by Bob Seger & the Silver Bullet Band
- Released: October 22, 1976
- Studios: Muscle Shoals (Sheffield, Alabama); Pampa (Warren, Michigan); Nimbus Nine (Toronto)
- Genres: Heartland rock; rock and roll
- Length: 36:50
- Label: Capitol
- Producers: Bob Seger; Punch Andrews; Muscle Shoals Rhythm Section; Jack Richardson

Bob Seger & the Silver Bullet Band chronology
Live Bullet (1976)	Night Moves (1976)	Stranger in Town (1978)

Singles from Night Moves
- 1. "Night Moves" Released: November 1976; 2. "Mainstreet" Released: April 1977; 3. "Rock and Roll Never Forgets" Released: June 1977

Night Moves is the ninth studio album by American rock singer-songwriter Bob Seger, released on October 22, 1976, by Capitol Records. It is his first studio album to credit his backing band, the Silver Bullet Band, although they only perform on five of the nine songs on the album; the other four features backing by the Muscle Shoals Rhythm Section.

The album was well received by critics and brought Bob Seger nationwide success. Three singles were released from the album; two of them reached the top 40 on the Billboard Hot 100. The album became Seger's second to receive a Gold certification from the Recording Industry Association of America (RIAA) and his first to receive a Platinum certification from the same organization. It was later certified 6× Platinum.

== Reception ==
Professional ratings
Review scores
Source	Rating
AllMusic	5/5 stars
Christgau's Record Guide	A−
Rolling Stone	4/5 stars

Village Voice critic Robert Christgau wrote that the riffs on Night Moves were classic rock and roll riffs, like those performed by Chuck Berry or the Rolling Stones, and that the album was about rock and roll for those who were no longer in their teens, like the song "Rock and Roll Never Forgets". The Rolling Stone review of the album by Kit Rachlis stated that the album was one of the best to come out of 1976–77, that Seger sounded like Rod Stewart and wrote lyrics like Bruce Springsteen, and that the album was classic rock and roll. The only criticism that Rachlis made of the album was the production not being strong enough. A later review of the album by Stephen Thomas Erlewine for AllMusic said that the album was very similar to Beautiful Loser (1975), but that Night Moves was harder than Beautiful Loser. Erlewine also said that the album had a wide range of styles and had not lost any of its influence years later.

Cash Box said that "'Ship of Fools' might turn into a classic rocker."

Classic Rock History critic Janey Roberts ranked four songs from Night Moves among Seger's 20 greatest – the three singles as well as "Come to Poppa".

== Track listing ==
All tracks are written by Bob Seger, except where noted.

Side One
No.	Title	Length
1.	"Rock and Roll Never Forgets"	3:52
2.	"Night Moves"	5:25
3.	"The Fire Down Below"	4:28
4.	"Sunburst"	5:13

Side Two
No.	Title	Writer(s)	Length
5.	"Sunspot Baby"		4:38
6.	"Mainstreet"		3:43
7.	"Come to Poppa"	Earl Randle, Willie Mitchell	3:11
8.	"Ship of Fools"		3:24
9.	"Mary Lou"	Young Jessie, Sam Ling	2:56

- Tracks 1, 3, 4 and 9 were recorded by the Silver Bullet Band in Detroit.
- Track 2 was recorded at Nimbus Nine Studios in Toronto, Ontario.
- Tracks 5 – 8 were recorded by the Muscle Shoals Rhythm Section at Muscle Shoals Sound Studios in Sheffield, Alabama.

== Personnel ==
Track numbering below refers to CD and digital releases of the album.

=== Musicians ===
All tracks

- Bob Seger – vocals, guitar, production

The Silver Bullet Band

- Drew Abbott – guitar (tracks 1, 3, 4, 8, 9); background vocals on "Mary Lou" (track 9)
- Robyn Robbins – piano and organ (tracks 1, 3, 4, 9)
- Alto Reed – tenor saxophone, alto saxophone, baritone saxophone, and flute (tracks 1, 3, 4, 9)
- Chris Campbell – bass (tracks 1—4, 9); background vocals on "Mary Lou" (track 9)
- Charlie Allen Martin – drums, tambourine, and maracas (tracks 1—4, 9); background vocals on "Mary Lou" (track 9)

Muscle Shoals Rhythm Section

- Pete Carr – lead guitar, rhythm guitar, acoustic guitar, and production (tracks 5—8)
- Jimmy Johnson – rhythm guitar and production (tracks 5—8)
- Barry Beckett – piano, organ, ARP synthesizer, clavinet, melodica, and production (tracks 5—8)
- David Hood – bass guitar and production (tracks 5—8)
- Roger Hawkins – drums, tambourine, maracas, congas, timpani, and production (tracks 5—8)

Additional musicians

- Jerry Luck – accordion on "Ship of Fools" (track 8)
- Joe Miquelon – guitar on "Night Moves" (track 2)
- Doug Riley – piano and organ on "Night Moves" (track 2)
- Sharon Lee Williams – backing vocals on "Night Moves" (track 2)
- Rhonda Silver – backing vocals on "Night Moves" (track 2)
- Laurel Ward – backing vocals on "Night Moves" (track 2)

=== Production ===
- Punch Andrews – production (tracks 1, 3, 4, 9)
- Jack Richardson – production (track 2)
- Jim Bruzzese – recording engineer, mixing engineer
- Brian Christian – recording engineer
- Jerry Masters – recording engineer
- Steve Melton – recording engineer
- Greg Miller – recording engineer
- Wally Traugott – mastering engineer
- Tom Bert – photography

== Charts ==
=== Weekly charts ===
Chart (1977)	Peak position
Canada Top Albums (RPM)	12
US Billboard 200	8

=== Year-end charts ===
Chart (1977)	Position
Canada Top Albums/CDs (RPM)	73
US Billboard 200	9

== Certifications ==
Region	Certification	Certified units/sales
Canada (Music Canada)	3× Platinum	300,000^{^}
United States (RIAA)	6× Platinum	6,000,000^{^}
^{^} Shipments figures based on certification alone.
