= We've Got Tonite =

1978 single by Bob Seger & the Silver Bullet Band

- Picture sleeve for the US single

Single by Bob Seger & the Silver Bullet Band

from the album Stranger in Town
- B-side: "Ain't Got No Money"
- Released: October 1978
- Recorded: 1976
- Genre: Soft rock
- Length: 4:38 (album version); 3:40 (single edit)
- Label: Capitol
- Songwriter: Bob Seger
- Producers: Bob Seger; Muscle Shoals Rhythm Section

Bob Seger & the Silver Bullet Band singles chronology
"Hollywood Nights" (1978)	"We've Got Tonite" (1978)	"Old Time Rock and Roll" (1979)

"We've Got Tonite" (also "We've Got Tonight") is a song written by American rock musician Bob Seger, from his album Stranger in Town (1978). The single record charted twice for Seger, and was developed from a prior song that he had written. Further versions charted in 1983 for Kenny Rogers as a duet with Sheena Easton, and again in 2002 for Ronan Keating. Seger rewrote the lyrics after seeing the 1973 film The Sting. Critics compared the song to Rod Stewart's "Tonight's the Night".

== Original version ==
Dave Marsh (Rolling Stone)
on "We've Got Tonite"
Seger's melodic sense has never been better than on "We've Got Tonite", a grand seduction song in the tradition of Rod Stewart's "Tonight's the Night".

=== Background ===
The song developed from an earlier Seger composition titled "This Old House" which featured the same chords as "We've Got Tonite" although the earlier song had a slightly different melody. Seger overhauled "This Old House" into "We've Got Tonite" the day after seeing the film The Sting (1973) which features a conversation between the Robert Redford character and a woman he is attracted to, played by Dimitra Arliss, who says: "I don't even know you." Redford's response, "You know me. It's two in the morning and I don't know nobody," caused an emotional response in Seger, manifested in the overhauled song lyrics.

"We've Got Tonite" was not recorded until the 1976 sessions for Seger's album Night Moves and was held off that album as Seger felt it was not a thematic fit. It was one of five Stranger... tracks recorded at Muscle Shoals Sound Studios with the Muscle Shoals Rhythm Section, and Venetta Fields, Clydie King, and Shirley Matthews provided the backing vocals.

"We've Got Tonite" served as the album's third single, reaching No. 13 on the US pop chart in 1978. It also played in the background of Melissa Sue Anderson's television film Survival of Dana (1979), in a scene where Anderson's character was in Los Angeles visiting the home of one of her new friends and was sitting in a room with co-star Robert Carradine's "Donny Davis" character, with whom she was falling in love. In the UK, the original version would chart twice, reaching No. 41 in 1979, then No. 22 as a 1995 re-release—as "We've Got Tonight"—to promote a Greatest Hits album. (In 1982, a live version—titled "We've Got Tonite"—from the in-concert album Nine Tonight reached No. 60 in the UK.)

Since the death of his mother Charlotte, Seger has made a point of always including "We've Got Tonite" in his live setlist, as it was her favorite of his compositions.

=== Personnel ===
Credits are adapted from the liner notes of Seger's 1994 Greatest Hits compilation.

- Bob Seger – lead vocals

Muscle Shoals Rhythm Section

- Barry Beckett – keyboards
- Pete Carr – lead guitar
- Jimmy Johnson – rhythm guitar
- David Hood – bass guitar
- Roger Hawkins – drums, percussion

Additional musicians

- Venetta Fields – background vocals
- Clydie King – background vocals
- Sherlie Matthews – background vocals
- Jim Ed Norman – string arrangement

=== Reception ===
Billboard described "We've Got Tonite" as a "melodic ballad featuring Seger's smokey and tender vocal" and said that the structure of the melody was similar to Rod Stewart's "Tonight's the Night". Cash Box called it a "sensitive ballad" with "stark opening tambourine beat, strings and strong upward swell" and praised Seger's vocals as well as the "brightness" provided by the backing vocals. Record World said that "The drama builds beautifully and Seger's raspy vocals carry the message with ease."

=== Charts ===
==== Weekly charts ====
Chart (1979)	Peak position
Australia (Kent Music Report)	31
Canada Top Singles (RPM)	9
Canada Adult Contemporary (RPM)	6
New Zealand (Recorded Music NZ)	12
South Africa (Springbok Radio)	11
UK Singles (Official Charts)	41
US Billboard Hot 100	13
US Adult Contemporary (Billboard)	29
US Cash Box Top 100	11

Chart (1982)	Peak position
UK Singles (Official Charts)	60

Chart (1995)	Peak position
Ireland (IRMA)	29
Scottish Singles Sales (Official Charts)	17
UK Singles (Official Charts)	22

==== Year-end charts ====
Chart (1979)	Rank
Canada Top Singles (RPM)	89
US Billboard Hot 100	94
US Cash Box Top 100	91

=== Certifications ===
Region	Certification	Certified units/sales
New Zealand (RMNZ)	Gold	15,000^{‡}
United Kingdom (BPI)	Silver	200,000^{‡}
^{‡} Sales+streaming figures based on certification alone.

== Kenny Rogers and Sheena Easton duet version ==
"We've Got Tonight"
- Picture sleeve for the UK single

Single by Kenny Rogers and Sheena Easton

from the album We've Got Tonight
- B-side: "You Are So Beautiful"
- Released: January 24, 1983
- Recorded: December 31, 1982–January 9, 1983
- Genre: Country
- Length: 3:49
- Label: Liberty
- Songwriter: Bob Seger
- Producers: David Foster, Kenny Rogers

Kenny Rogers singles chronology
"A Love Song" (1982)	"We've Got Tonight" (1983)	"All My Life" (1983)

Sheena Easton singles chronology
"I Wouldn't Beg for Water" (1982)	"We've Got Tonight" (1983)	"Telefone (Long Distance Love Affair)" (1983)

=== Background ===
In 1983, American country-pop star Kenny Rogers recorded the song as a duet with Scottish pop star Sheena Easton, and made it the title track of his album We've Got Tonight. Both Rogers and Easton were on the roster of EMI America-Liberty Records and their collaboration on "We've Got Tonight" was at the firm suggestion of label chairman Larry Mazza who hoped to restore Easton to chart ascendancy. Mazza was also the president of Capitol Records the label of release for the Bob Seger original. Rogers stated: "I liked the idea of recording with Sheena. I thought the contrast in styles--I'm so throaty and she's so trained and pure--would really work well." Rogers himself phoned Easton to pitch their duet on December 23, 1982. The two singers then met up on Christmas Eve to rehearse the song with a piano, six days later going into the studio, with the completed track going to radio nine days later.

Easton would assert that it was the song choice which appealed to her, while allowing Rogers to be "a good singer with a distinctive voice" who she found "always helpful and co-operative" in the studio, debunking insider reports that the ten-day recording session for the track was a stormy one with Rogers overtly disliking Easton's high-pitched vocals. Easton's contribution to the track would prove critical contention.

=== Reception ===
Billboard said that the song "gets a full production treatment, building on the contrast between two such distinctive and familiar voices." Rolling Stone critic Chris Connelly would dismiss the Easton/Rogers duet of "We've Got Tonight" as "shrieking [and] insensitive", and Jerseyite critic Jim Bohen would lament how Rogers "who usually sounds good duetting with women" was defeated by her nails-across-the-blackboard voice. But Dennis Hunt (Los Angeles Times) would prefer the Rogers/Easton take to the Seger original due to a "very appealing" "blend of sharply contrasting voices, his deep and hers very high," adding that "Rogers, never known for his vocal power, stretches to match Easton, [attaining] his finest vocal performance." And AllMusic critic Joe Viglione would opine that Easton's "splendid voice reaching the high registers over Kenny's familiar monotone...really makes [the track] special."

A number one hit on the Billboard Country Singles chart, "We've Got Tonight" reached number six on the Billboard Hot 100 pop singles chart, and number two on the Billboard Adult Contemporary chart, also reaching the top 30 in the United Kingdom. Rebranded as a country & western song due to Rogers, "We've Got Tonight" would be honored by ASCAP as the Most Performed Country Song of 1983, with Seger, an iconic Detroit rocker, personally acknowledging the honor by attending the October 1984 ASCAP Country Music Awards fête held at the Opryland Hotel in Nashville.

In Brazil, the single has exceeded 100,000 copies.

=== Personnel ===
- Kenny Rogers – lead vocals
- Sheena Easton – lead vocals
- Paul Jackson Jr., Marty Walsh – guitars
- David Foster – acoustic and electric pianos
- Nathan East – bass guitar
- Michael Baird – drums
- Jeremy Lubbock – string arrangement
- Humberto Gatica – engineer

=== Charts ===
==== Weekly charts ====
Chart (1983)	Peak position
Australia (Kent Music Report)	11
Austria (Ö3 Austria Top 40)	11
Belgium (Ultratop 50 Flanders)	20
Canada Top Singles (RPM)	4
Canada Adult Contemporary (RPM)	1
Canada Country Singles (RPM)	1
France (IFOP)	71
Germany (GfK)	56
Ireland (IRMA)	18
Luxembourg (Radio Luxembourg)	24
Netherlands (Single Top 100)	24
Netherlands (Dutch Top 40)	21
New Zealand (Recorded Music NZ)	13
Norway (VG-lista)	10
UK Singles (Official Charts)	28
US Billboard Hot 100	6
US Hot Country Songs (Billboard)	1
US Adult Contemporary (Billboard)	2
US Cash Box Top 100	10

==== Year-end charts ====
Chart (1983)	Rank
Australia (Kent Music Report)	68
Canada Top Singles (RPM)	42
Canada Country Singles (RPM)	7
US Billboard Hot 100	40
US Hot Country Songs (Billboard)	32
US Adult Contemporary (Billboard)	25
US Cash Box Top 100	54

== Ronan Keating duet version ==
"We've Got Tonight"

Single by Ronan Keating and Lulu, Jeanette or Giorgia

from the album Destination and Together
- Released: November 25, 2002
- Length: 3:39
- Label: Polydor
- Songwriter: Bob Seger
- Producer: Bill Padley

Ronan Keating singles chronology
"I Love It When We Do" (2002)	"We've Got Tonight" (2002)	"The Long Goodbye" (2003)

Lulu singles chronology
"Phunk Phoolin'" (2002)	"We've Got Tonight" (2002)	"All the Love in the World" (2003)

Jeanette singles chronology
"Rock My Life" (2002)	"We've Got Tonight" (2002)	"It's Over Now" (2003)

=== Background ===
"We've Got Tonight" was remade by Irish singer Ronan Keating and Scottish singer Lulu for Lulu's twelfth studio album, Together (2002), with the track also appearing on Keating's second studio album, Destination (2002). The Together album, consisting of tracks pairing Lulu with a variety of "name" duet partners, was a comeback vehicle for Lulu designed by top entertainment impresario Louis Walsh, whom the singer had signed on with in 2000. Three of the acts the album paired Lulu with—Samantha Mumba, Westlife, and Keating—were protégées of Walsh; however, Keating has said that Lulu herself recruited him to duet with her, stating, "I said 'Yeah, as long as you let me pick the song!' I picked...one of my all-time favorite love songs."

Both the Together and Destination albums were released in the spring of 2002; it was decided to forego any single releases of off Together, but after two earlier singles, Keating's label Polydor issued "We've Got Tonight"—credited to Ronan Keating featuring Lulu—on November 25, 2002, and it debuted at its No. 4 peak on the UK Singles Chart on December 1, 2002. The track was also an international hit, reaching No. 7 in the Netherlands, No. 10 in Ireland, No. 12 in Australia, and No. 14 in Flanders.

Polydor Records decided to release a reformatted version of the track that replaced Lulu with Jeanette Biedermann, a Polydor artist who had enjoyed considerable success with English-language releases in her native Germany, Austria, and Switzerland. This version of the duet was issued in those three nations with top-ten peaks in Austria and Germany and a No. 25 peak in Switzerland. In Italy, the track was issued with Italian soul singer Giorgia Todrani and published as the B-side of Giorgia's single "Gocce di memoria". In the Philippines, Keating performed the song with Kyla.

=== Track listings ===
UK single

1. "We've Got Tonight" (featuring Lulu) – 3:39
2. "All I Have Is My Heart" – 3:50
3. "In the Ghetto" (Live) – 3:13
4. "We've Got Tonight" (Video) – 4:15

German single

1. "We've Got Tonight" (featuring Jeanette) – 3:39
2. "Sea of Love" – 3:14
3. "All I Have Is My Heart" – 3:50
4. "In the Ghetto" (Live) – 3:13

Italian single

1. "We've Got Tonight" (featuring Giorgia) – 3:39
2. "All I Have Is My Heart" – 3:50

=== Charts ===
==== Ronan Keating and Lulu ====
Weekly charts

Chart (2002–2003)	Peak position
Australia (ARIA)	12
Belgium (Ultratop 50 Flanders)	14
Belgium (Ultratip Bubbling Under Wallonia)	14
Europe (Eurochart Hot 100)	20
Ireland (IRMA)	10
Netherlands (Dutch Top 40)	11
Netherlands (Single Top 100)	7
New Zealand (Recorded Music NZ)	46
Romania (Romanian Top 100)	9
Scottish Singles Sales (Official Charts)	1
Sweden (Sverigetopplistan)	25
UK Singles (Official Charts)	4
UK Airplay (Music Week)	22

Year-end charts

Chart (2002)	Position
Ireland (IRMA)	95
UK Singles (OCC)	78

Chart (2003)	Position
Australia (ARIA)	83
Netherlands (Single Top 100)	77
Romania (Romanian Top 100)	32

==== Ronan Keating and Jeanette ====
Weekly charts

Chart (2002–2003)	Peak position
Austria (Ö3 Austria Top 40)	6
Czech Republic (IFPI)	30
Europe (Eurochart Hot 100)	30
Germany (GfK)	7
Switzerland (Schweizer Hitparade)	25

Year-end charts

Chart (2003)	Position
Austria (Ö3 Austria Top 40)	47

=== Certifications ===
Region	Certification	Certified units/sales
Australia (ARIA)	Gold	35,000^{^}
Germany (BVMI)	Gold	250,000^{‡}
^{^} Shipments figures based on certification alone.^{‡} Sales+streaming figures based on certification alone.

=== Release history ===
Region	Date	Format(s)	Label(s)	Ref(s).
United Kingdom	November 25, 2002	Polydor	CD; cassette	
Australia	December 2, 2002	Polydor	CD	

== Other versions ==
"We've Got Tonight" played in the background of Melissa Sue Anderson's television film Survival of Dana (1979), in a scene where Anderson's character was in Los Angeles visiting the home of new friends and was in a room with co-star Robert Carradine's character Donny Davis, with whom she was falling in love. In season 4, episode 4 of the television series Ray Donovan, Liev Schreiber sings a karaoke version of the song, then a reprise to his wife as the episode ends.

The song has also been recorded by Rein Alexander (a duet with Trine Rein, album Song for You, 2007), Bill Anderson (album Nashville Mirrors, 1980), Anne Lise (album First Dance, 2006), Patti Austin (album Body Language, 1980), Shirley Bassey (album The Show Must Go On, 1996), Elkie Brooks whose version charted at No. 67 in the UK in 1987 (album No More the Fool, 1986), Rhonda Burchmore (album Midnight Rendezvous, 2001), Rita Coolidge (as "Tonite", a duet with Jermaine Jackson, album Never Let You Go, 1983), Nianell (with Dozi, album It Takes Two, 2009), Allison Durbin (album Country Love Songs, 1983), Ray Dylan (duet with Charlize Berg, album Goeie Ou Country in Duet, 2013), Adam Harvey & Beccy Cole (album The Great Country Song Book Volume II, 2017), Richie Havens (album Connections, 1980), Steven Houghton (album Steven Houghton, 1997), Tom Jones (album Mr Jones, 2002), Reg Livermore (album Livermore's Firing Squad, 1983), Barry Manilow (album Summer of '78, 1996), Jane McDonald (album The Singer of Your Song, 2014), Melanie (album Moments from My Life, 2002), Angelika Milster (duet with Steve Barton, album Ich bin wie ich bin, 1984), Chord Overstreet (multi-artist album Muscle Shoals...Small Town, Big Sound, 2018), Marti Pellow (album Love to Love, 2011), Tex Perkins & His Ladyboyz (album No.1's & No.2's, 2008), Lee Towers & Anita Meyer (album Run to Me, 1985), Conway Twitty (as "Tonite", album Heart & Soul, 1980), and Dottie West (as "Tonite", album Special Delivery, 1980).

American Idol season 11 contestant and eventual winner Phillip Phillips performed "We've Got Tonight" on the episode broadcast May 16, 2012; his studio recording of the song appeared on the Billboard Hot 100 at number 97.

Sheena Easton also recorded a Spanish-language version of "We've Got Tonight" entitled "La Noche Y Tú" on her 1984 Spanish-language album Todo Me Recuerda A Ti, the track being a duet with Dyango. The song has also been rendered in Italian as "Grazie perché" by Amii Stewart and Gianni Morandi, a No. 5 hit in Italy in 1984; and in Czech as "Všímej si víc", recorded in 1983 by Věra Špinarová and Karel Černoch. Another Czech rendering of the song, "Čas dál nech spát", was recorded in 2012 by David Deyl and Helena Vondráčková, included on Vondráčková's 3-CD compilation Helena (nejen) o lásce. A German version entitled "Das kann ich gut" was recorded in 1981 by Katja Ebstein.
