= Old Time Rock and Roll =

1979 single by Bob Seger

Single by Bob Seger

from the album Stranger in Town
- B-side: "Sunspot Baby"
- Released: March 1979
- Genre: Rock and roll
- Length: 3:14
- Label: Capitol
- Songwriters: George Jackson, Thomas E. Jones III, Bob Seger (uncredited lyrics)
- Producers: Bob Seger; Muscle Shoals Rhythm Section

Bob Seger singles chronology
"We've Got Tonight" (1978)	"Old Time Rock and Roll" (1979)	"Fire Lake" (1980)

Audio
- "Old Time Rock & Roll" by Bob Seger on YouTube

"Old Time Rock And Roll"
Bob Seger's "Old Time Rock And Roll" from Stranger in Town

"Old Time Rock and Roll" is a song written by George Jackson and Thomas E. Jones III with uncredited lyrics by Bob Seger. It was recorded by Seger for his tenth studio album Stranger in Town (1978). It was also released as a single in 1979. It is a sentimentalized look back at the music of the original rock 'n' roll era and has often been referenced as Seger's favorite song. The song gained renewed popularity after being featured in the 1983 film Risky Business. It has since become a standard in popular music and was ranked number two on the Amusement & Music Operators Association's survey of the Top 40 Jukebox Singles of All Time in 1996. It was also listed as one of the Songs of the Century in 2001 and ranked No. 100 in the American Film Institute's 100 Years...100 Songs poll in 2004 of the top songs in American cinema.

== History ==
The Muscle Shoals Rhythm Section, who often backed Seger in his studio recordings, sent Seger a demo of the song during the recording of Stranger in Town. He said in 2006 (and also on the "Stranger in Town" episode of the US radio show In the Studio with Redbeard a few years earlier):

All I kept from the original was: "Old time rock and roll, that kind of music just soothes the soul, I reminisce about the days of old with that old time rock and roll". I rewrote the verses and I never took credit. That was the dumbest thing I ever did. And Tom Jones (Thomas E. Jones) and George Jackson know it, too. But I just wanted to finish the record [Stranger in Town]. I rewrote every verse you hear except for the choruses. I didn't ask for credit. My manager said: "You should ask for a third of the credit." And I said: "Nah. Nobody's gonna like it." I'm not credited on it so I couldn't control the copyright either. Meanwhile, it got into a Hardee's commercial because I couldn't control it. Oh my God, it was awful!

However, George Stephenson of Malaco Records claimed:

"Old Time Rock and Roll" is truly [George] Jackson's song, and he has the tapes to prove it, despite Seger's claims that he altered it. Bob had pretty much finished his recording at Muscle Shoals and he asked them if they had any other songs he could listen to for the future.

At the close of the decade, in December 2019, Seger restated his assertion that he rewrote the lyrics in the verses.

The song was recorded at the Muscle Shoals Sound Studio in Sheffield, Alabama, and Sound Suite Studios in Detroit, Michigan. The guitar solo was contributed by Howie McDonald. Originally, the Silver Bullet Band was displeased with the song's inclusion on Stranger in Town, claiming, according to Seger, that the song was not "Silver Bullety". However, upon hearing audience reactions to it during their tour in Europe, the band grew to like the song.

In 1990, Seger joined Billy Joel on one occasion and Don Henley on another to play the song during their concerts in Auburn Hills, Michigan. He also performed the song at his Rock and Roll Hall of Fame induction ceremony.

== Personnel ==
Credits are adapted from the liner notes of Seger's 1994 Greatest Hits compilation.

The Silver Bullet Band

- Bob Seger – lead vocals
- Alto Reed – saxophone

Muscle Shoals Rhythm Section

- David Hood – bass
- Roger Hawkins – drums, percussion

Additional musicians

- Ken Bell – guitar
- Randy McCormick – piano
- Howie McDonald – guitar solo
- James Lavell Easley – background vocals
- Stanley Carter – background vocals
- George Jackson – background vocals

== Reception ==
"Old Time Rock and Roll" achieved substantial album-oriented rock radio airplay and as the fourth single from Stranger in Town. It achieved varying peaks of popularity in the industry trade magazines: #40 in Record World, #28 on the Billboard Hot 100, and #34 in Cash Box during mid 1979. It was re-released in 1983 after its inclusion in the film Risky Business and reached number 48 on the Billboard chart. The song remains a staple on classic rock radio.

Billboard felt that the song's highlights are Seger's "rough-edged vocals and the power charged instrumentation." Cash Box said it is "a piece of infectious raucous joy" that is a highlight of Seger's concerts.

In Australia, the song was released twice and charted for a total of 55 weeks. The first run was in 1983 after its use in the film Risky Business, reaching number 53 on the charts. The second run saw it reach number 3 in late 1987 and it was the 3rd biggest selling single in Australia in that year.

== Cover versions ==
"Old Time Rock and Roll"

Single by Status Quo

from the album Famous in the Last Century
- Released: 2000
- Genre: Boogie rock; rockabilly; rock and roll
- Length: 2:58
- Songwriters: George Jackson, Thomas E. Jones III, Bob Seger

Singer Johnny Hallyday released a French-language version, as "Le Bon Temps du Rock and Roll" in 1979 on his album Hollywood.

Pop singer Ronnie Dove recorded the song in 1987. It was issued as the B side to his single "Heart". It later appeared on his 1988 album From the Heart.

In 2000, the British rock band Status Quo recorded a version of this song for their album Famous in the Last Century. They played it on Top of the Pops and released it as a single which charted in the UK Singles Chart (No. 78) and Norway (No. 4).

== In popular culture ==
The song was featured in the 1983 film Risky Business, starring Tom Cruise. Cruise's character, Joel Goodsen, famously lip-syncs and dances in his underwear as this song plays after his parents leave him home alone. In 1985, the Chipmunks did a version that, as Seger pointed out above, was used in the aforementioned Hardee's commercial advertising Alvin and the Chipmunks glasses. In 1986, the song was also featured in the TV series ALF, in a caricature of the aforementioned Tom Cruise scene, in which Alf has similarly been left home alone and trashes the house. Activision created a series of Guitar Hero: World Tour television commercials directed by Brett Ratner based on the scene, each featuring a different set of celebrities lip-syncing to the lyrics while using the new instrument controllers. The first ad included athletes Kobe Bryant, Tony Hawk, Alex Rodriguez, and Michael Phelps. The song is also featured in episodes of The Nanny, The Fresh Prince of Bel-Air, Growing Pains, Northern Exposure, South Park, Scrubs, and The Flash. Another Risky Business homage was performed faithfully by character Eddie Diaz in season 8 of 9-1-1. Steve Harrington briefly sang it in an episode of season 1 of the Netflix television series Stranger Things. It was also used in the teaser trailer for Garfield: The Movie (2004).

In early 2020, the song was featured in a Domino's Pizza commercial about contactless delivery during the COVID-19 pandemic. The commercial parodied the scene from Risky Business and featured Curtis Armstrong who starred in the movie. The sixteen note piano vamp at the beginning of the song (played by Randy McCormick in the original Muscle Shoals recording session) was used as a cellphone ring tone during the Season 3 Premiere episode of the American TV series Tracker.

== Charts ==
Chart (1979–1987)	Peak position
Canada RPM Top 100	31
New Zealand Singles Chart	38
U.S. Billboard Hot 100	28
U.S. Cash Box Top 100	34

Chart (1983–1987)	Peak position
Australian Kent Music Report	3
U.S. Billboard Hot 100	48
U.S. Cash Box Top 100	38

== Certifications ==
Region	Certification	Certified units/sales
New Zealand (RMNZ)	3× Platinum	90,000^{‡}
United Kingdom (BPI)	Silver	200,000^{‡}
United States (RIAA)	2× Platinum	2,000,000^{‡}
^{‡} Sales+streaming figures based on certification alone.
