= Hollywood Nights =

Single by Bob Seger & The Silver Bullet Band

from the album Stranger in Town
- B-side: "Brave Strangers"
- Released: July 1978
- Genre: Rock
- Length: 5:05
- Label: Capitol
- Songwriter: Bob Seger
- Producers: Bob Seger, Punch Andrews

Bob Seger & The Silver Bullet Band singles chronology
"Still the Same" (1978)	"Hollywood Nights" (1978)	"We've Got Tonite" (1978)

"Hollywood Nights" is a song written and recorded by American rock artist Bob Seger. It was released in 1978 as the second single from his album, Stranger in Town.

== Background ==
Seger said "The chorus just came into my head; I was driving around in the Hollywood Hills, and I started singing 'Hollywood nights/Hollywood hills/Above all the lights/Hollywood nights.' I went back to my rented house, and there was a Time with Cheryl Tiegs on the cover...I said 'Let's write a song about a guy from the Midwest who runs into someone like this and gets caught up in the whole bizarro thing.'"

Seger also said that "Hollywood Nights" was the closest he has had to a song coming to him in a dream, similar to how Keith Richards described the riff to "(I Can't Get No) Satisfaction" coming to him in a dream. Seger said:

The closest one is probably "Hollywood Nights." I usually have a guitar or a keyboard nearby. It’s very seldom that I’m driving in a car and something rolls into my head, but that song did. I was out in Los Angeles and I was just beginning to record Stranger In Town. I had a house out in the Hollywood Hills. I could see the city from my house. I’d be driving up there in the Hollywood Hills, just driving along, and then suddenly: "Hollywood nights, Hollywood Hills, above all the lights, Hollywood nights." It just came right into my head. So I turned right around and drove home, and I’m singing this in my head thinking: “Don’t forget it, don’t forget it! Don’t turn on the radio!." I get home and I sing it into my little cassette recorder. Okay, that’s a good start. It’s high energy and it’s gonna be fun and the girls [Laura Creamer and Shaun Murphy] are gonna sing it like crazy. I’ve been singing with these gals for the last 38 years, ever since Ramblin' Gamblin' Man and they’re gonna nail it. That was one that came out of nowhere.

== Personnel ==
Credits are adapted from the liner notes of Seger's 1994 Greatest Hits compilation.

The Silver Bullet Band

- Bob Seger – lead vocals, guitar
- Chris Campbell – bass
- David Teegarden – drums, percussion

Additional musicians

- Bill Payne – piano, organ
- Julia Waters, Luther Waters, Maxine Waters, Oren Waters – background vocals

== Reception ==
Billboard described "Hollywood Nights" as "a gut crunching rocker with all the stops pulled out" and described Seger's vocal performance as "absolutely demonic." Cash Box called it "a solid rocker about a Hollywood romance" with "a commanding beat, piano fills, driving guitar work and excellent lead and backing vocals." Cash Box also said that "Hollywood Nights" is "what Seger is all about." Record World said that this song is a "perfect example" of how "Seger is a master of the story song with a strong rock beat" and that "the lyrics are compelling and the outfront piano and Seger's throaty vocals give them even more substance." Classic Rock History critic Janey Roberts rated it as Seger's 13th best song.

Beginning in their 2022–23 season, the Los Angeles Kings have played "Hollywood Nights" after wins at their home arena, Crypto.com Arena.

Jelly Roll and Travis Barker performed a cover of "Hollywood Nights" on January 30, 2025 at Intuit Dome in Inglewood, California for FireAid, a relief concert for the 2025 Southern California wildfires.

== Chart performance ==
The single edit of "Hollywood Nights" reached No. 12 on the US Billboard Hot 100 chart. In the UK, the full five-minute version was released as a single on black and silver vinyl, and gave him his chart debut at No. 42. A live version from the in-concert album Nine Tonight in 1981 was issued in the UK as a single and charted at No. 49, while a reissue of the original version in 1995 charted at No. 52.

== Certifications ==
Region	Certification	Certified units/sales
New Zealand (RMNZ)	Gold	15,000^{‡}
United States (RIAA)	Gold	500,000^{‡}
^{‡} Sales+streaming figures based on certification alone.
