= Stranger in Town (album) =

Studio album by Bob Seger & the Silver Bullet Band
- Released: May 5, 1978
- Studios: Criteria (Miami); Muscle Shoals (Sheffield, Alabama); Cherokee (Hollywood); Capitol (Hollywood); Sound Suite (Detroit)
- Genre: Rock
- Length: 39:28
- Label: Capitol
- Producers: Bob Seger, Punch Andrews, Muscle Shoals Rhythm Section

Bob Seger & the Silver Bullet Band chronology
Night Moves (1976)	Stranger in Town (1978)	Against the Wind (1980)

Singles from Stranger in Town
- 1. "Still the Same" Released: April 1978; 2. "Hollywood Nights" Released: July 1978; 3. "We've Got Tonite" Released: October 1978; 4. "Old Time Rock and Roll" Released: March 1979

"Old Time Rock and Roll"
Bob Seger's "Old Time Rock and Roll" from Stranger in Town

Stranger in Town is the tenth studio album by American rock singer Bob Seger and his second with the Silver Bullet Band, released by Capitol Records in May 1978. As with its predecessor, the Silver Bullet Band backed Seger on about half of the songs and the Muscle Shoals Rhythm Section backed Seger on the other half.

The album became an instant success in the United States, being certified platinum by the Recording Industry Association of America (RIAA) less than a month after the album's release, and, like its predecessor Night Moves, it would later go 6× platinum. It was also his first album to chart in the UK, where limited editions were released on silver vinyl and in picture disc format as well as standard black vinyl.

== Critical reception ==
Professional ratings
Review scores
Source	Rating
AllMusic	4.5/5 stars
The Rolling Stone Album Guide	4/5 stars
The Village Voice	B−

The New York Times wrote that, "while [the album] reaffirms that Mr. Seger is a fine rock singer and a sometimes sensitive songwriter, it also suggests that his gifts aren't so varied or consistent as they might be."

== Track listing ==
All tracks are written by Bob Seger, except where noted.

Side One
No.	Title	Writer(s)	Length
1.	"Hollywood Nights"		4:59
2.	"Still the Same"		3:18
3.	"Old Time Rock and Roll"	George Jackson; Thomas Earl Jones III	3:14
4.	"Till It Shines"		3:50
5.	"Feel Like a Number"		3:42

Side Two
No.	Title	Writer(s)	Length
1.	"Ain't Got No Money"	Frankie Miller	4:11
2.	"We've Got Tonite"		4:38
3.	"Brave Strangers"		6:20
4.	"The Famous Final Scene"		5:09

Notes The Silver Bullet Band plays on side one tracks 1, 2, & 5 and on side two track 3

The Muscle Shoals Rhythm Section plays on side one tracks 3 & 4 and on side two tracks 1, 2, & 4

== Personnel ==
- Bob Seger – vocals, guitar, piano

The Silver Bullet Band

- Drew Abbott – guitar
- Robyn Robbins – keyboards
- Alto Reed – saxophone
- Chris Campbell – bass guitar
- David Teegarden – drums, percussion

Muscle Shoals Rhythm Section

- Barry Beckett – keyboards
- Pete Carr – guitar
- Jimmy Johnson – guitar
- David Hood – bass guitar
- Roger Hawkins – drums, percussion

Additional musicians

- Ken Bell – guitar on "Old Time Rock & Roll"
- Glenn Frey – guitar solo on "Till It Shines"
- Don Felder – guitar solo on "Ain't Got No Money"
- Bill Payne – piano, organ on "Hollywood Nights"
- Doug Riley – piano on "Feel Like a Number" and "Brave Strangers"
- Randy McCormick – piano on "Old Time Rock & Roll"
- Howie McDonald – guitar solo on "Old Time Rock & Roll"

Background singers

"We've Got Tonite" and "Still the Same"

- Venetta Fields – vocals, background vocals
- Clydie King – vocals, background vocals
- Sherlie Matthews – vocals, background vocals

"Hollywood Nights"

- Julia Waters – background vocals
- Luther Waters – vocals, background vocals
- Maxine Waters – background vocals
- Oren Waters – vocals, background vocals

"Brave Strangers"

- Brandye – vocals, background vocals

"Old Time Rock & Roll"

- James Lavell Easley – background vocals
- Stanley Carter – background vocals
- George Jackson – vocals, background vocals

Production

- Producers: Punch Andrews, Bob Seger
- Engineers: John Arrias, Mark Calice, David Cole, Hugh Davies, Gregg Hamm, Steve Melton, George Tutko
- Mixing: Punch Andrews, John Arrias, Bob Seger
- Mastering: Wally Traugott
- Remastering: Punch Andrews, 1999
- Remastering: Robert Vosgien
- String arrangements: Jim Ed Norman
- Horn arrangements: Alto Reed
- Art direction: Roy Kohara
- Design: Ken Anderson
- Photography: Terrence Bert, Bob Siedemann

== Charts ==
=== Album ===
==== Weekly charts ====
Chart (1978–79)	Peak position
Canada Top Albums/CDs (RPM)	5
French Top Albums	14
German Albums Chart	28
New Zealand Top 40 Albums	4
Swedish Top 60 Albums	45
UK Albums Chart	31
US Billboard 200	4

==== Year-end charts ====
Chart (1978)	Position
Canada Top Albums/CDs (RPM)	25
New Zealand Albums (RMNZ)	32
US Billboard 200	45
Chart (1979)	Position
New Zealand Albums (RMNZ)	37
US Billboard 200	14

=== Singles ===
Year	Single	Chart	Position
1978	"Still the Same"	Billboard Hot 100	4
1978	"Hollywood Nights"	Billboard Hot 100	12
1978	"We've Got Tonite"	Billboard Hot 100	13
1979	"Old Time Rock and Roll"	Billboard Hot 100	28

== Certifications ==
Region	Certification	Certified units/sales
Canada (Music Canada)	4× Platinum	400,000^{^}
United Kingdom (BPI)	Gold	100,000^{^}
United States (RIAA)	6× Platinum	6,000,000^{^}
^{^} Shipments figures based on certification alone.
