= David Teegarden =

American drummer

David Teegarden is an American musician who was a member of the American psych-rock group Teegarden & Van Winkle. He is a resident of Tulsa, Oklahoma. Teegarden has worked with many musicians including J. J. Cale, Eric Clapton, Joe Walsh, and Bob Seger. In 1981, Teegarden won a Grammy for Best Rock Performance by a Duo or Group with Vocal for Against the Wind with Bob Seger & the Silver Bullet Band.

Teegarden appeared on the Smokin' O.P.'s album with Bob Seger as a member of Teegarden & Van Winkle, with guitarist Michael Bruce (not the Michael Bruce who played with Alice Cooper) and also appeared on the albums Nine Tonight, Stranger in Town, Against the Wind, and The Fire Inside with Seger, as a member of the Silver Bullet Band. Teegarden currently owns and runs Teegarden Studios, located in the historic Pearl District of Tulsa, Oklahoma. (https://teegardenstudios.com/about/)

Teegarden was inducted into the Oklahoma Music Hall of Fame on June 14, 2017.

Teegarden lost his son, David Teegarden Jr., on November 29, 2024.

Despite the differences in spelling of their last names, jazz trombonist Weldon Leo Jack Teagarden, Detroit Free Press writer-columnist Carol Teegardin, and David Teegarden are all related.
