= Live Bullet =

Live album by Bob Seger & The Silver Bullet Band
- Released: April 12, 1976
- Recorded: September 4–5, 1975
- Venue: Cobo Hall in Detroit
- Genre: Rock
- Length: 70:40
- Label: Capitol
- Producers: Punch Andrews; Bob Seger

Bob Seger & The Silver Bullet Band chronology
Beautiful Loser (1975)	Live Bullet (1976)	Night Moves (1976)

Professional ratings
Review scores
Source	Rating
AllMusic	5/5 stars
Christgau's Record Guide	B

‘Live’ Bullet is a live album by American rock band Bob Seger & the Silver Bullet Band, released on April 12, 1976. It was recorded at Cobo Arena in Detroit, Michigan, during the heyday of that arena's time as an important rock concert venue. The album is credited, along with Night Moves, with launching Seger's mainstream popularity.

== History ==
'Live' Bullet became a staple of FM rock radio in Detroit. Classics such as the live version of "Nutbush City Limits" and the medley of "Travelin' Man/Beautiful Loser" were among the most widely played live tracks on Detroit stations such as WWWW (W4), WRIF, and WABX. Other tracks such as "Let It Rock", "Turn the Page" and "Get Out of Denver" also received wide airplay in Detroit.

The success of Seger's music at this time, however, was highly regional, with Seger still remaining quite unknown in adjacent media markets such as Chicago. Even in his home state of Michigan, Seger often struggled to garner mass appeal outside the Metro Detroit area. In December, 1975, 3 months after 'Live' Bullet was recorded, a scheduled concert at Western Michigan University was cancelled after only a few hundred advance tickets were sold. In June 1976, Seger played the Pontiac Silverdome in metropolitan Detroit at a historic concert that also included Point Blank, Elvin Bishop and Todd Rundgren. 78,000 people were in attendance and the concert lasted until nearly 1:30 a.m. The next night, Seger played for fewer than a thousand people in Chicago.

However, it was only in the following winter that the release of his next recording, Night Moves, launched Seger into more national markets. Over time, the life-on-the-road tale "Turn the Page" would become the most nationally played song from 'Live' Bullet, and a perennial favorite on album-oriented rock and classic rock stations.

For Detroit fans, however, the entire 'Live' Bullet recording captured a Detroit artist at the height of his energy and creativity, in front of a highly appreciative hometown crowd. 'Live' Bullet also captured the wild and free spirit of rock concerts in the 1970s, and has great historic value in that regard.

As I told everybody last night, I was reading in Rolling Stone where they said, "Detroit audiences are the greatest rock and roll audiences in the world." I thought to myself, "Shit! I've known that for ten years!"

— Bob Seger, "Nutbush City Limits", 'Live' Bullet

== Critical reception ==
Critic Dave Marsh called Live Bullet "one of the best live albums ever made."

In 2015, Live Bullet was ranked No. 26 on Rolling Stone's "50 Greatest Live Albums of All Time" list. Readers of Rolling Stone ranked it No. 10 in a 2012 poll of all-time favourite live albums. In an article supporting the 2015 list, Seger states, "We were doing 250 to 300 shows a year before Live Bullet. We were playing five nights a week, sometimes six, as the Silver Bullet Band, and we just had that show down."

== Track listing ==
All tracks are written by Bob Seger, except where noted.

Side One
No.	Title	Writer(s)	Length
1.	"Nutbush City Limits"	Tina Turner	4:37
2.	"Travelin' Man"		4:53
3.	"Beautiful Loser"		4:00
4.	"Jody Girl"		4:28

Side Two
No.	Title	Writer(s)	Length
1.	"I've Been Working"	Van Morrison	4:35
2.	"Turn the Page"		5:05
3.	"U.M.C. (Upper Middle Class)"		3:17
4.	"Bo Diddley"	E. McDaniels (Bo Diddley)	5:40

Side Three
No.	Title	Length
1.	"Ramblin' Gamblin' Man"	3:01
2.	"Heavy Music"	8:14
3.	"Katmandu"	6:23

Side Four
No.	Title	Writer(s)	Length
1.	"Lookin' Back"		2:36
2.	"Get Out of Denver"		5:21
3.	"Let It Rock"	E. Anderson (Chuck Berry)	8:30

The 2011 remastered CD reissue has one extra track, "I Feel Like Breaking Up Somebody’s Home", (3:05), recorded live at the Pontiac Silverdome on June 26, 1976.

The live version of the song "Katmandu" was also featured as the sole Bob Seger track as part of a promotional-only compilation album issued by Capitol records entitled The Greatest Music Ever Sold, which was distributed to record stores during the 1976 holiday season as part of Capitol's "Greatest Music Ever Sold" campaign, promoting 15 "best of" albums released by the record label. 'Live' Bullet is a live album and not a "best of" compilation, though several tracks were major regional hits ("Lookin' Back" #2 in Detroit, etc.).

Many songs from the album such as "Nutbush City Limits", "Lookin' Back", and "Turn the Page" became hit singles off the album, whereas their original studio versions were overlooked. Lookin' Back was released as a solo single in 1971, but it was not on an actual Seger album. It was originally recorded by the Bob Seger System, whereas the Live Bullet version featured The Silver Bullet Band.

Two of the songs on the album are actually medleys. "Bo Diddley" is a medley of "Bo Diddley" and "Who Do You Love?", while "Let It Rock" is a medley of "Let It Rock" and "Little Queenie" with some minor lyrical changes. Additionally, the tracks "Travelin' Man" and "Beautiful Loser" feature no audible pause between the two, and are played as a single medley (though the CD has a digital track marker for each). As a result, many album-oriented rock and classic rock radio stations have played them together as a medley.

== Personnel ==
- Bob Seger – lead vocals, guitar, piano
- Drew Abbott – lead guitar, background vocals
- Alto Reed – tenor saxophone, alto saxophone, baritone saxophone, percussion, background vocals
- Robyn Robins – organ, clavinet, Mellotron, piano on "Katmandu"
- Chris Campbell – bass guitar, background vocals
- Charlie Allen Martin – drums, background vocals, answer vocals on "Heavy Music", harmony vocals on "Jody Girl" and "Get Out of Denver"

== Charts ==
=== Album ===
Year	Chart	Position
1976	Billboard Pop Albums	34
1986	Billboard 200	135

=== Single ===
Song	Year	Chart	Position
"Nutbush City Limits"	1976	Billboard Pop Singles	69
"Travelin' Man"	1976	Billboard Pop Singles	–
"–" indicates releases that did not chart

== Certifications ==
Organization	Level	Date
RIAA – U.S.	Gold	December 12, 1976
RIAA – U.S.	Platinum	December 16, 1977
CRIA – Canada	Gold	December 1, 1979
CRIA – Canada	Platinum	December 1, 1979
CRIA – Canada	Double Platinum	December 1, 1983
RIAA – U.S.	4× Platinum	June 6, 1991
RIAA – U.S.	5× Platinum	September 22, 2003
