= Punch Andrews =

American music producer

Edward "Punch" Andrews is a music producer who produced many albums of Bob Seger and The Silver Bullet Band and served as his manager for over fifty years. Andrews has also managed Kid Rock as well as Grand Funk Railroad during the mid-1990s.
