= Ride Out (album) =

Studio album by Bob Seger
- Released: October 14, 2014
- Recorded: 2010–2014 in Nashville and Detroit
- Genres: Rock; heartland rock
- Length: 34:21
- Label: Capitol
- Producer: Bob Seger

Bob Seger chronology
Ultimate Hits: Rock and Roll Never Forgets (2011)	Ride Out (2014)	I Knew You When (2017)

Deluxe edition cover

Singles from Ride Out
- 1. "Detroit Made" Released: August 14, 2014; 2. "You Take Me In" Released: September 9, 2014

Professional ratings
Aggregate scores
Source	Rating
Metacritic	69/100
Review scores
Source	Rating
AllMusic	2.5/5 stars
American Songwriter	3/5 stars
Chicago Tribune	3/5 stars
The Chronicle	(favorable)
Daily News	4/5 stars
Morning Sun	B+
Paste	7.5/10
Rolling Stone	(favorable)
Ultimate Classic Rock	(mixed)
Yahoo! Music	(favorable)

Ride Out is the seventeenth studio album by American rock singer–songwriter Bob Seger. The album was released on October 14, 2014.

Although Seger had previously stated that it might be his final album, a follow-up album entitled I Knew You When, composed mainly of previously unreleased tracks, was released on November 17, 2017.

== Background ==
Ride Out was Seger's first album of new material in eight years. After 2006's Face the Promise, it was the second studio album since 1975 to be credited to Bob Seger rather than Bob Seger & The Silver Bullet Band.

"This album touches on how I think a lot of us feel about finding our place in a more complicated world – from how we appreciate things as simple and pure as love, to navigating through the corruption and violence that permeates the news. It sums up a lot of feelings I have about a variety of subjects."

— Bob Seger talking about his motivations for Ride Out in a press release

Rumors about the album started to spread as far back as 2010. On July 13, 2011, Bob Seger reported via Facebook that he was recording new material at Ocean Way in Nashville. A Rolling Stone article from February 16, 2012 suggested that the album would be released in September of that year; however, the album did not come out. On April 11, 2013, Seger told the audience at a live performance in Detroit: "We should have our new album out in late August—if we are lucky." That date was also not met. The official announcement of the album was finally made on August 18, 2014.

Seger stated that he really made an effort to "break new ground" on this album and, therefore, none of the songs on it would sound quite like anything he had done before. Seger said he approached this album differently in terms of feels and speeds.

== Release and editions ==
The official announcement of the album was preceded by the release of the lead single "Detroit Made" to radio stations on August 14, 2014. The album title, artwork and release date were announced on August 18, 2014. The album was scheduled to be released by Capitol Records on October 14, 2014. Initially, no other information besides the release date was made public. On August 28, 2014, a photograph "showing a hand-written list of 13 truncated song titles on top of a studio mixing board" was posted on Seger's official Facebook page. Although this appeared to be the track listing of Ride Out, the final list of songs to be included in the album was not announced officially until September 9, 2014 when the album became available for pre-order on iTunes and Amazon.com.

Besides the regular 10-track album, an expanded deluxe edition with three additional tracks and different artwork is available. Both editions were released on compact disc. Target offers an exclusive version of the deluxe edition with two additional bonus tracks. The album is available as a digital download as well, although the majority of Seger's back catalog was not yet available for purchase in digital format. Unlike Seger's past few albums since 1994's Greatest Hits, Ride Out is also available on vinyl in a 180-gram pressing aimed at audiophiles.

== Content ==
Alongside six of Seger's original compositions, the album includes a number of cover versions, which is not common for Seger as his albums usually contain no more than one or two songs that he did not write himself or in collaboration. One exception from that rule is the cover album Smokin' O.P.'s from 1972.

=== Cover songs ===
On Ride Out, Seger chose to include a total of four cover songs by well-known singer-songwriters of the country and Americana genres. Two of the songs are classics of the genre while the other two were released fairly recently.

==== "Detroit Made" ====
The uptempo rock song "Detroit Made" was written by American singer–songwriter John Hiatt as "a musical mash note to the Buick Electra 225" It was first released by Hiatt himself on his 2011 album Dirty Jeans and Mudslide Hymns.

==== "The Devil's Right Hand" ====
"The Devil's Right Hand" is an alternative country classic by Steve Earle from his 1988 album Copperhead Road. Versions of the song were recorded by country legends Johnny Cash and Waylon Jennings among others.

"It was performed by Waylon Jennings, whom I've always loved, and then I found out I think about five years later that Steve Earle wrote it. I was watching the movie at home and I said 'Oh my gosh,' cause he's one of my favorite songwriters. It's a powerful combination — Steve Earle and Waylon Jennings."

— Bob Seger talking about "The Devil's Right Hand" in the soundtrack of Betrayed (1988)

For Ride Out, Seger recreated Jennings' country take on the song that he first heard decades ago in the soundtrack of the 1988 motion picture Betrayed. The song plays in a scene at the very end of the film. Seger said that he fell in love with the song right away. He explained that he was even more excited when he found that Steve Earle was the writer of the song while watching the film at home. Both Jennings and Earle are musicians and songwriters that Seger likes very much.

Jennings also admired Seger, who reportedly was his favorite rock and roll singer. Jennings recorded Seger's classic "Turn the Page" for his 1985 album of the same name. The same year, he also recorded Seger's "Against the Wind" together with Willie Nelson, Johnny Cash and Kris Kristofferson as The Highwaymen for their debut album.

In late November 2010, it was reported that Seger had agreed to participate in an upcoming tribute album to Jennings, who died in 2002. The album materialized in February 2012 in the form of The Music Inside: A Collaboration Dedicated to Waylon Jennings, Volume 1. A second volume was released exactly one year later, but a scheduled third volume did not come out. Bob Seger appeared on none of these albums. According to producer Witt Stewart, he had wanted Seger to record "Don't You Think This Outlaw Bit's Done Got Out of Hand" for the first volume of the tribute album series, which was eventually recorded by James Otto. It was reported that Seger and several other artists were left off the first volume because of timing issues. It was also reported that Seger had written a song with Jennings.

Seger stated that his intention for his take on "The Devil's Right Hand" for Ride Out was to stay very true to Jennings' version of the song. Seger's cover version was made available for purchase as a digital download on September 23, 2014.

==== "Adam and Eve" ====
"Adam and Eve" is a song by the Australian singer-songwriter couple of Kasey Chambers and Shane Nicholson. It was released as a single from their 2012 album Wreck & Ruin.

==== "California Stars" ====
"California Stars" is a song whose lyrics were written by American folk singer–songwriter Woody Guthrie in the late 1930s and eventually set to music by Jeff Tweedy and Jay Bennett of the American alternative rock band Wilco. The song was first released by Wilco and English folk singer–songwriter Billy Bragg on their 1998 collaboration album Mermaid Avenue. Seger said that he heard the song only one time on the radio and thought he needed to record it.

=== Original compositions ===
Of Seger's own compositions, "Hey Gypsy" is probably the one that he talked about the most in the years leading up to the release of Ride Out. Seger had already rehearsed the song for his 2011 tour but it eventually never made it on the set list. Seger wrote the Texas swing-styled song in homage to the late blues guitarist Stevie Ray Vaughan. Other songs that Seger previously mentioned and that are included in the album are the title track, "Gates of Eden," and "You Take Me In."

Seger talked about many more songs in interviews that were eventually dropped from the track listing. See Unused songs for more information.

== Singles ==
Two songs off Ride Out were released as singles, namely "Detroit Made" and "You Take Me In."

=== "Detroit Made" ===
The lead single off the album is the cover song "Detroit Made." Bob Seger's take on John Hiatt's song was released to radio stations on August 14, 2014, coinciding with the Woodward Dream Cruise, a classic car event that is held annually on the third Saturday of August in Metropolitan Detroit. A music video for the song showing classic cars owned by Michigan natives driving through the streets of Detroit was largely shot at this event. The video was premiered on September 10, 2014 at RollingStone.com.

Seger's long-time friend and fellow Detroit native Kid Rock, who had already collaborated with Seger on "Real Mean Bottle" from his 2006 album Face the Promise, was supposed to make a guest appearance on "Detroit Made" but ultimately, that did not happen.

=== "You Take Me In" ===
The second single off the album is the ballad "You Take Me In," which was released as a promotional single to radio stations. It was also made available for purchase as a digital download on Amazon and iTunes on September 9, 2014, coinciding with the beginning of the pre-order period for the album.

== Live performances ==
Long before its announcement, Seger already started trying out songs for the album at live performances.

=== Rock and Roll Never Forgets tour 2013 ===
Seger and his Silver Bullet Band premiered three of the songs off Ride Out—namely "Detroit Made," "California Stars" and "All of the Roads"—on their 2013 Rock and Roll Never Forgets Tour of North America, which started on February 27, 2013 in Toledo, Ohio and concluded on May 11, 2013 in Edmonton, Alberta.

Seger chose "Detroit Made" as the opening song in most of the concerts on his 2013 tour. Another song that was performed in almost all of the concerts on that tour was "California Stars." Bob Seger performed the song for the first time at the opening concert of his 2013 tour, which was held in Toledo on February 27, 2013.

Besides those two cover versions, one song written by Seger also had its premiere at the same concert. The song is called "All of the Roads" and was described as "a mid-tempo acoustic guitar driven tune" that "was premiered to warm reception".

=== Ride Out tour 2014 ===
In late August 2014, it was suggested that Seger and band would tour again in the fall of 2014 in support of Ride Out, but dates were not announced. It was reported in early September 2014 that Seger and his Silver Bullet Band had been holding rehearsals in suburban Detroit. A post on Seger's Facebook page from September 19, 2014 read: "STAY TUNED! BIG Announcement will come at any time!" On September 22, 2014, the tour page on BobSeger.com read "News on the way..."

Finally, a 23-city tour of North America was officially announced on September 25, 2014. The first leg of the tour started in Saginaw, Michigan on November 19, 2014 and wrapped at Madison Square Garden in New York City on December 19, 2014. The second leg was scheduled to start a month later in Pittsburgh, Pennsylvania on January 22, 2015 and conclude in Los Angeles on February 27, 2015. Dates for Detroit were added at a later point alongside additional dates. The J. Geils Band opened select dates on the tour.

Tickets for the first leg of the tour went on sale at 10 a.m., October 4, 2014 at Ticketmaster.com and LiveNation.com. Members of the official Bob Seger fan club got early access to tickets at 10 a.m., October 1, 2014. One day earlier, tickets were already available at TicketProcess.com. Also, holders of a Citi credit card were able to order tickets early, starting at 4 p.m., October 1, 2014. Two days later, on October 3 from 10 a.m. to 10 p.m, the next round of ticket pre-sales was for the Live Nation mobile app, venues and sponsors. Tickets for the Canadian shows in Halifax, Nova Scotia and Saint John, New Brunswick became available at 10 a.m., October 11, 2014.

=== Television appearances ===
To promote the album, Seger made a number of appearances on television shows.

Coinciding with the release date of Ride Out, he performed on ABC's Jimmy Kimmel Live! on October 14, 2014. Backed by a huge lineup of the Silver Bullet Band including three backup singers and a five-member horn section, Seger played on an outdoor stage in Hollywood performing the single "Detroit Made" and the classic "Hollywood Nights." Besides those two songs that were broadcast on television, Seger and band also played "Roll Me Away, "Tryin' to Live My Life Without You," "The Fire Down Below," "Mainstreet," and "Old Time Rock and Roll."

On October 16, 2014, Seger was a musical guest on NBC's The Ellen DeGeneres Show. He performed "Hey Gypsy" and "Night Moves."

On November 13, 2014, Seger appeared on CBS This Morning, where he talked about his long career and the new album.

== Track listing ==
All tracks are written by Bob Seger, except where noted.

No.	Title	Writer(s)	Length
1.	"Detroit Made"	John Hiatt	3:46
2.	"Hey Gypsy"		2:32
3.	"The Devil's Right Hand"	Steve Earle	3:49
4.	"Ride Out"		3:07
5.	"Adam and Eve" (feat. Laura Creamer on vocals)	Kasey Chambers; Shane Nicholson	3:12
6.	"California Stars"	Woody Guthrie; Jeff Tweedy; Jay Bennett	4:44
7.	"It's Your World"		3:17
8.	"All of the Roads"		3:34
9.	"You Take Me In"		2:33
10.	"Gates of Eden"		3:47
Total length:			34:21

Deluxe edition bonus tracks
No.	Title	Length
11.	"Listen" (feat. Vince Gill on vocals)	3:20
12.	"The Fireman's Talkin"	2:44
13.	"Let the Rivers Run"	3:51
Total length:		44:16

Target exclusive deluxe edition bonus tracks
No.	Title	Length
11.	"Listen" (feat. Vince Gill on vocals)	3:20
12.	"The Fireman's Talkin"	2:44
13.	"Let the Rivers Run"	3:51
14.	"It All Goes On"	3:41
15.	"Passin' Through"	4:48
Total length:		53:04

== Unused songs ==
Seger considered more than 70 songs for inclusion in the album; however, only ten tracks made it onto the final album. A number of titles of songs that Seger thought about including were mentioned at one point or another. Among other things, he talked about a "father-daughter" song called "Hannah" that was said to feature guest appearances by Kid Rock and Sheryl Crow. All three of them already collaborated on Kid Rock's song "Collide," which was released as a single from his 2010 album Born Free.

Another song that Seger talked about in interviews is "The Sea Inside," which he described as "very Led Zeppelin." Other songs he mentioned recording include "I'll Remember You," "Wonderland" and "The Price," the latter a duet with Trisha Yearwood. He also dallied with the idea of including live versions of Little Feat's "Fat Man in the Bathtub," Tom Waits' "Blind Love" and his own "Sometimes."

One song that was also said to be included in the album at one point is Seger's version of Waits' "Downtown Train." That song ultimately ended up on the 2011 retrospective album Ultimate Hits: Rock and Roll Never Forgets.

The previously mentioned tracks "I'll Remember You" and "The Sea Inside" later appeared on Seger's 2017 follow-up album I Knew You When.

== Personnel ==
A number of prolific session musicians from Nashville worked with Seger on the album. Among them are Rob McNelley (guitar), Glenn Worf (bass), Jim "Moose" Brown (keyboards, guitar), Biff Watson (guitar), and Chad Cromwell (drums). Also present is Seger's usual group of backing vocalists including Laura Creamer, Shaun Murphy and Barb Payton, and The Motor City Horns. Country singer and guitarist Vince Gill is a guest vocalist on the track "Listen."

== Charts ==
=== Weekly charts ===
Chart (2014)	Peak position
Canadian Albums (Billboard)	12
US Billboard 200	3
US Top Rock Albums (Billboard)	1

=== Year-end charts ===
Chart (2014)	Position
US Billboard 200	174
US Top Rock Albums (Billboard)	38
