= Early Seger Vol. 1 =

Compilation album by Bob Seger
- Released: November 24, 2009
- Recorded: 1972–2009
- Genre: Rock
- Length: 35:21
- Label: Hideout
- Producer: Various

Bob Seger chronology
| Face the Promise (2006) | Early Seger Vol. 1 (2009) | Ultimate Hits: Rock and Roll Never Forgets (2011) |

Singles from Early Seger Vol. 1
- 1. "Gets Ya Pumpin'"; 2. "Midnight Rider"

Professional ratings
Review scores
| Source | Rating |
|---|---|
| AllMusic | 3/5 stars |
| Classic Rock Revisited | B |
| Detroit Free Press | 4/4 stars |
| The Detroit News | B |
| Rolling Stone | (mixed) |

Early Seger Vol. 1 is a compilation album by American rock singer–songwriter Bob Seger, released in 2009. The album, which includes archival material from the 1970s and 1980s, was released exclusively to Meijer stores on November 24, 2009. Since November 30, 2009, it has also been available for purchase at BobSeger.com, both on CD and as a digital download (in MP3 and FLAC). Eventually Early Seger Vol. 1 became available at Amazon.com on February 1, 2010. "Gets Ya Pumpin" and "Midnight Rider" are the first two singles from the album.

On October 25, 2009, the album title and cover art were revealed by photographer Tom Weschler and music journalist Gary Graff on WXYZ-TV's Action News This Morning. The compilation album was originally conceived to complement their collaborative book Travelin' Man: On the Road and Behind the Scenes with Bob Seger. The photograph of Seger used for the cover of the album was taken by Weschler at Detroit's Cobo Arena in September 1975 and is also featured in the book. Early Seger Vol. 1's cover art and track listing were posted on Seger's official website a few days after it was made public.

The album features a collection of songs taken from three of Seger's pre-Beautiful Loser albums, some of them remixed or re-recorded in parts, and also four previously unreleased tracks. The previously available material comes from the albums Smokin' O.P.'s (1972), Back in '72 (1973), and Seven (1974), only the former being still in print. Initially Early Seger Vol. 1 would have been a compilation culled from just these three albums (hence the "Early Seger" tag), but when the project really started to take shape in September 2009, Seger made the decision to include some unreleased tracks from his archives. According to Punch Andrews, Seger worked on about a dozen unreleased songs and picked out his favorite four tracks.

Apart from "Gets Ya Pumpin'", which was written in 1973 and recorded in 1977, these unreleased songs originate from the mid-1980s and were originally considered for inclusion on the 1986 album Like a Rock. The song "Wildfire" was about to be the title track of that album at one point, but finally it did not even make the track list. "Star Tonight" was written and recorded by Seger in 1985 but initially released in a version by Don Johnson, with Willie Nelson on backing vocals, on his solo debut album Heartbeat (1986).

The compilation album's opening song, a cover version of The Allman Brothers Band's "Midnight Rider" from Back in '72, has been out of print for decades and is available on compact disc for the very first time. "Get Out of Denver" and "U.M.C." were available on CD in the early 1990s but have been out of print since soon after the release. All tracks have been remastered and/or remixed; additionally some of the recordings have been enhanced with overdubs, which were cut at Yessian Studios in Farmington Hills, Michigan, and Kid Rock's Allen Roadhouse recording studio in Clarkston, Michigan, in September and October 2009. Most notably The Motor City Horns, a Detroit based horn section, which has worked with Seger before, added horn arrangements to "Gets Ya Pumpin'" and "Long Song Comin'", a completely re-recorded version of a song originally released on Seven in 1974. From the same album comes "Get Out of Denver", which now features a reworked guitar solo by Jim McCarty of Mitch Ryder's Detroit Wheels, The Rockets, Mystery Train and Helldriver. Guitarist Marlon Young and keyboard player Jimmie Bones, both members of Kid Rock's Twisted Brown Trucker Band, also took part in the sessions. Keith Kaminski, of The Motor City Horns, is featured with a tenor saxophone solo on "Gets Ya Pumpin'".

In the future there will likely be additional volumes in the Early Seger-series but so far no determination has been made.

== Track listing ==
All tracks are written by Bob Seger, except where noted.

| No. | Title | Writer(s) | Original Album | Length |
|---|---|---|---|---|
| 1. | "Midnight Rider" | Gregg Allman, Robert Payne | Back in '72 | 2:23 |
| 2. | "If I Were a Carpenter" | Tim Hardin | Smokin' O.P.'s | 3:49 |
| 3. | "Get Out of Denver" | | Seven | 2:46 |
| 4. | "Someday" | | Smokin' O.P.'s | 2:34 |
| 5. | "U.M.C. (Upper Middle Class)" | | Seven | 3:17 |
| 6. | "Long Song Comin'" (2009 re-recording) | | Seven | 3:50 |
| 7. | "Star Tonight" | | previously unreleased | 3:40 |
| 8. | "Gets Ya Pumpin'" | | previously unreleased | 4:09 |
| 9. | "Wildfire" | | previously unreleased | 4:37 |
| 10. | "Days When the Rain Would Come" | | previously unreleased | 4:16 |
