= The Real Love =

1991 single by Bob Seger

Single by Bob Seger & the Silver Bullet Band

from the album The Fire Inside
- B-side: "Roll Me Away"; "The Mountain"
- Released: 1991
- Length: 4:38 (album version); 3:43 (7-inch edit)
- Label: Captiol
- Songwriter: Bob Seger
- Producer: Don Was

Bob Seger & the Silver Bullet Band singles chronology
"Take a Chance" (1991)	"The Real Love" (1991)	"The Fire Inside" (1991)

Audio
- "The Real Love" on YouTube

"The Real Love" is a song by American rock band Bob Seger & the Silver Bullet Band. Frontman Bob Seger wrote the track for the band's sixth studio album, The Fire Inside (1991), and it was produced by Don Was. In Europe, "The Real Love" was released as the album's second single, while in the United States, where "Take a Chance" did not receive a commercial release, it served as the album's lead single. According to Seger, the song is about a man who searches for true love, with "simple" lyrics.

Released as a single in the United States in mid-1991, "The Real Love" gave Seger his 19th and most recent top-40 hit on the US Billboard Hot 100 chart, peaking at number 24 that October. In Canada, the song became a number-one hit the same month, topping the RPM 100 Hit Tracks ranking, and it also charted in Australia, Germany, and Switzerland. A music video was made to promote the song; it was filmed in Colorado and Utah and features 40 cast members, including previous Silver Bullet Band members.

== Reception ==
Upon the song's release, Dave Sholin of American trade publication Gavin Report gave "The Real Love" a positive review, calling it "real music" and stating that Bob Seger's music "never fails to touch the soul".

Commercially, the song became Seger's 19th and final top-40 hit in the United States, peaking at number 24 on the Billboard Hot 100 in October 1991. It became a top-10 hit on the Billboard Adult Contemporary and Album Rock Tracks charts, peaking at number four on both listings. In Canada, the single topped the RPM 100 Hit Tracks and 40AC (Adult Contemporary) rankings, ending the year as Canada's 23rd-most-successful single overall. In Europe, "The Real Love" charted in Germany, reaching number 51 for two nonconsecutive weeks in 1991, and in Switzerland, where it peaked at number 27 in January 1992; it is Seger's only charting song in the latter nation. The song also reached the top 100 on Australia's ARIA Singles Chart, peaking at number 92 in late 1991.

== Track listings ==
US 7-inch single

A. "The Real Love" – 4:38
B. "Roll Me Away" – 4:39

US and Canadian cassette single

1. "The Real Love" (edit)
2. "The Mountain" (LP version)

European CD single

1. "The Real Love" (LP version)
2. "Which Way"
3. "The Mountain"
4. "Hollywood Nights"

European and UK 7-inch single

A. "The Real Love" (edit) – 3:43
B. "Which Way" – 3:57

European and UK 12-inch single

A1. "The Real Love" (LP version) – 4:38
B1. "Which Way" – 3:57
B2. "The Mountain" – 4:23

UK CD1 and cassette single

1. "The Real Love" (edit)
2. "Which Way"
3. "The Mountain"
4. "Hollywood Nights"

UK CD2

1. "The Real Love"
2. "Even Now"
3. "We've Got Tonite"
4. "Nutbush City Limits"

== Credits and personnel ==
Credits are lifted from The Fire Inside album booklet.

Studios

- Mixed at Conway Recording Studios (Hollywood, California)
- Engineered at Ocean Way Studios (Hollywood, California)
- Mastered at Capitol Recording Studios (Hollywood, California)

Personnel

- Bob Seger – writing, vocals, electric piano
- Mike Campbell – lead electric guitar, acoustic guitar, acoustic 12-string guitar, Danelectro bass guitar
- Waddy Wachtel – acoustic rhythm guitar
- James "Hutch" Hutchinson – bass
- Craig Frost – organ
- Jamie Muhoberac – additional synthesizers
- Kenny Aronoff – drums
- James Newton Howard – Synclavier strings
- Don Was – production, mixing
- Don Smith – mixing
- Ed Cherney – engineering
- Marnie Riley – engineering assistance
- Dan Bosworth – engineering assistance
- Wally Traugott – mastering

== Charts ==
=== Weekly charts ===
Chart (1991–1992)	Peak position
Australia (ARIA)	92
Canada Top Singles (RPM)	1
Canada Adult Contemporary (RPM)	1
Germany (GfK)	51
Switzerland (Schweizer Hitparade)	27
UK Airplay (Music Week)	60
US Billboard Hot 100	24
US Adult Contemporary (Billboard)	4
US Mainstream Rock Airplay (Billboard)	4
US Cash Box Top 100	25

=== Year-end charts ===
Chart (1991)	Position
Canada Top Singles (RPM)	23
Canada Adult Contemporary (RPM)	29
US Adult Contemporary (Billboard)	49

== Release history ==
Region	Date	Format(s)	Label(s)	Ref.
United States	1991	7-inch vinyl; cassette	Capitol	
United Kingdom	September 23, 1991	7-inch vinyl; 12-inch vinyl; CD1; cassette	Capitol	
Australia	September 30, 1991	CD; cassette	Capitol	
United Kingdom	October 7, 1991	CD2	Capitol	
