= The Fire Inside =

The Fire Inside or Fire Inside may refer to:

== Music ==
- The Fire Inside (Bob Seger album), 1991 album
  - "The Fire Inside" (Bob Seger song)
- The Fire Inside (Luke Sital-Singh album), 2014 album
- "The Fire Inside", a song written by Diane Warren for the 2023 film Flamin' Hot, recorded by Becky G
- "Fire Inside", song by Yung Bleu and Zayn from 2022 album Tantra
- AFI (band), also known as A Fire Inside

== Film ==
- The Fire Inside (film), 2024 American biographical sports film
