= I Knew You When (album) =

Studio album by Bob Seger
- Released: November 17, 2017
- Recorded: 1993–2017
- Genre: Rock
- Length: 40:48
- Label: Capitol
- Producer: Bob Seger

Bob Seger chronology
Ride Out (2014)	I Knew You When (2017)

Deluxe edition cover

Singles from I Knew You When
- 1. "Busload of Faith" Released: September 22, 2017

Professional ratings
Aggregate scores
Source	Rating
Metacritic	61/100
Review scores
Source	Rating
AllMusic	3/5 stars
CountryMusicNews.de	4/5 stars
Slant Magazine	3/5 stars

I Knew You When is the eighteenth and final studio album by American rock singer-songwriter Bob Seger. It was released on November 17, 2017.

== Background ==
The album was recorded in Nashville and Detroit and produced by Seger himself. The first song that became available from the album was "Glenn Song", which was written by Seger as a tribute to his friend Glenn Frey of the Eagles, who had died one year before. On January 18, 2017—eight months before the album was announced—Seger released "Glenn Song" for free on his official website. The song recounts his long friendship with Frey that began in 1966.

When the album's track listing was revealed on October 13, 2017, "Glenn Song" was listed as one of three bonus tracks that can be found on the deluxe edition of I Knew You When. Along with the track listing, the album covers of both the 10-track standard edition and the 13-track deluxe edition were revealed as well, and the album became available for pre-order the same day. The standard edition is available on CD and 130-gram vinyl, while the deluxe edition is available on CD, as a digital download, and via select streaming services.

Along with the announcement of I Knew You When on September 22, 2017, a cover version of Lou Reed's "Busload of Faith" was released as the first single taken from the album. The song was originally released by Reed on his 1989 album New York. Seger recorded his version of the song at a studio session in Nashville during May 2017 and premiered it with his Silver Bullet Band at a concert in Cincinnati on September 21, 2017, as part of his Runaway Train tour. Besides Reed's "Busload of Faith", Seger included another cover song in the album, namely "Democracy", which was written by Leonard Cohen and originally released on his 1992 album The Future.

A number of Seger's own compositions for the album were written and originally recorded many years or even decades ago but remained unreleased at the time. The oldest one is the uptempo rock song "Runaway Train", which was first recorded in 1993 for Seger's fifteenth studio album, 1995's It's a Mystery. The upbeat "Blue Ridge", which has been compared to Seger's "Sightseeing" from 1991's The Fire Inside, and the album's title track, "I Knew You When", both date back to 1997 and were potential candidates for Seger's 2006 album Face the Promise. The anthem-like "Forward into the Past", a song in the vein of Seger's "American Storm" or "Even Now", is from 1999 and was once to be the title track of his sixteenth studio album, while the ballad "Something More" is from 2001. The two tracks "I'll Remember You" and "The Sea Inside", the latter of which Seger described as "very Led Zeppelin", were mentioned in interviews with Seger as early as 2011. They were to be included on his then upcoming seventeenth studio album, 2014's Ride Out, but ultimately did not make it onto the album.

Initially, the November 17 release date of I Knew You When would have marked the last day of the Runaway Train tour—named after the song of the same name from the album—that began on August 24, 2017, but Seger had to postpone all concert dates starting September 30 due to "an urgent medical issue with his vertebrae". Of the 32 scheduled tour dates, Seger could complete 13 and had to postpone 19.

== Track listing ==
All tracks are written by Bob Seger, except where noted.

No.	Title	Writer(s)	Length
1.	"Gracile"		2:48
2.	"Busload of Faith"	Lou Reed	4:32
3.	"The Highway"		3:38
4.	"I Knew You When"		3:53
5.	"I'll Remember You"		3:48
6.	"The Sea Inside"		4:14
7.	"Marie"		3:26
8.	"Runaway Train"	Seger; Craig Frost; Tim Mitchell	4:10
9.	"Something More"		3:47
10.	"Democracy"	Leonard Cohen	6:32
Total length:			40:48

Deluxe edition bonus tracks
No.	Title	Writer(s)	Length
11.	"Forward into the Past"	Seger; Frost; Mark Chatfield	4:12
12.	"Blue Ridge"		3:50
13.	"Glenn Song"		2:49
Total length:			51:39

== Charts ==
=== Weekly charts ===
Chart (2017)	Peak position
Belgian Albums (Ultratop Wallonia)	181
Canadian Albums (Billboard)	69
German Albums (Offizielle Top 100)	74
Swiss Albums (Schweizer Hitparade)	87
US Billboard 200	25
US Top Rock Albums (Billboard)	2

=== Year-end charts ===
Chart (2018)	Position
US Top Rock Albums (Billboard)	87
