= Back in '72 =

Studio album by Bob Seger
- Released: January 1973
- Recorded: 1972; Paradise Studios, Tijuana, Oklahoma; Pampa Studios, Warren, Michigan; Muscle Shoals Sound Studios, Sheffield, Alabama
- Genre: Hard rock
- Length: 35:10
- Label: Palladium/Reprise
- Producers: Punch Andrews, Bob Seger

Bob Seger chronology
Smokin' O.P.'s (1972)	Back in '72 (1973)	Seven (1974)

Singles from Back in '72
- 1. "Midnight Rider" Released: 1972; 2. "Turn the Page" Released: 1973; 3. "Rosalie" Released: 1973

Back in '72 is the sixth studio album by American rock singer-songwriter Bob Seger, released in 1973. It was the first new album on Seger's manager Punch Andrews' label, Palladium Records, to be released under their distribution deal with the Reprise division of Warner Bros. Records and one of three early Seger albums that has never been reissued on CD.

== Recording ==
The album was recorded partly with the Muscle Shoals Rhythm Section, a renowned group of session musicians. According to Seger, there was a financial misunderstanding with the musicians: they offered to record him "for $1500 a side", which he took to mean $1500 per album side. When he found out that they meant $1500 per song, he left after recording three songs but resolved to work with them in the future.

The album contains the original studio version of "Turn the Page", a live recording of which would be released on Live Bullet in 1976 and would become a staple of classic rock radio. It's believed that much of the influence of this album is a result of his brief experience as a member of the Theta Delta Chi fraternity at Michigan State University.

The song "Rosalie" was written in tribute to Rosalie Trombley, the music director of CKLW-AM in Windsor, Ontario, which was an important Top 40 radio station in the 1960s and 1970s. The song was made more famous by the Irish rock band Thin Lizzy, who originally recorded it for their 1975 album Fighting; another recording, included on their live album Live and Dangerous in 1978, became a hit single in the UK in the same year.

== Reception and legacy ==
Professional ratings
Review scores
Source	Rating
AllMusic	4.5/5 stars
Christgau's Record Guide	B

Back in '72 reached only 188 on the US charts and has since faded into obscurity. Even so, the album and its supporting tour mark the beginnings of Seger's long-time relationships with future Silver Bullet Band saxophonist Alto Reed, powerhouse female vocalist Shaun Murphy, and the Muscle Shoals Rhythm Section.

Stephen Thomas Erlewine of Allmusic retrospectively gave the album 4.5/5 stars, calling it "not only the finest of [Seger's] early-'70s albums but one of the great lost hard rock albums of its era," and "a testament to great rock & roll, thanks to Seger's phenomenal songwriting and impassioned playing."

Record World called the single "Rosalie" a "thumper that should make Top 40 and progressive ears ring with delight."

Despite being a fan favorite by many die-hard Seger fans, and including classic live staples and radio hits such as "Neon Sky", "I've Been Working" and the original studio version of the epic live ballad "Turn the Page", this album has never been reissued and is extremely rare to find on any format, even as a bootleg. However, the Allman Brothers cover "Midnight Rider" which appears on the album was later released on Seger's compilation record Early Seger Vol. 1 in 2009. The song was remixed and remastered from the original vinyl LP version, and it was shortened by fading out at the end. The original version did not fade out but instead broke down to where Seger "scat sang" before the final beat.

In 2005, shortly after the reissue of Smokin O.P.'s, there were rumors of the album to be reissued onto a CD. Seger denied these rumors saying that he did not like the vocals on the album and probably will not release it for quite some time. This marks the album as an extremely rare and unheard-of Seger gem much like 1969's Noah and 1971's acoustic solo album Brand New Morning which Seger has also often stated that he may never reissue.

This album has turned out to have inspired several bands: Steve Miller Band's "Rock'n Me" has a similar melody as "Rosalie", Crowded House's version of "Silent House" is similar to "So I Wrote You A Song", and "I've Got Time" led to "More Than A Feeling" by Boston.

== Track listing ==
All tracks are written by Bob Seger, except where noted.

Side One
No.	Title	Writer(s)	Length
1.	"Midnight Rider"	Gregg Allman, Robert Payne	2:45
2.	"So I Wrote You a Song"		2:44
3.	"Stealer"	Andy Fraser, Paul Rodgers, Paul Kossoff	2:55
4.	"Rosalie"		3:22
5.	"Turn the Page"		5:11

Side Two
No.	Title	Writer(s)	Length
1.	"Back in '72"		4:25
2.	"Neon Sky"		3:35
3.	"I've Been Working"	Van Morrison	4:33
4.	"I've Got Time"		5:40

Back in '72 has never been rereleased officially on vinyl or CD.

== Personnel ==
- Bob Seger – guitar, vocals
- Jack Ashford – maracas, marimba, tambourine
- Barry Beckett – organ, piano, electric piano, RMI electronic piano
- Philip Bliss – steel guitar (A2)
- Eddie "Bongo" Brown – conga
- JJ Cale – lead guitar (A1)
- Pete Carr, Jimmy Johnson – guitar
- Tom Cartmell – flute, saxophone
- Roger Hawkins – drums
- David Hood – bass guitar
- Marcy Levy – background vocals (A2)
- Bill Mueller – guitar (A4)
- Jamie Oldaker – drums (A2, A4, B1)
- Sergio Pastora – conga, tambourine, timbales
- Scherrie Brown – background vocals (A2)
- Dick Sims – organ, piano, clavinet, pedal bass (A2, A4, B1)
- Luke Smith – background vocals (A1)

== Production ==
- Engineers: Jim Bruzzese, John LeMay, Jerry Masters, Greg Miller
- Mixing: Punch Andrews, Jim Bruzzese, Bob Seger
- Design: Bob Seger, Thomas Weschler, Christopher Wharf
- Photography: Thomas Weschler

== Charts ==
Album – Billboard (United States)

Year	Chart	Position
1973	Pop Albums	188
