= Brand New Morning =

Brand New Morning may refer to:

- Brand New Morning (Bob Seger album), 1971
- Brand New Morning (Magnum album), 2004
- "Brand New Morning / Jealousy Jealousy", a 2017 single by Japanese group Morning Musume
