= Lucifer (Bob Seger song) =

- Italian release picture sleeve

Single by Bob Seger System

from the album Mongrel
- B-side: "Big River"
- Released: April 1970
- Genre: Rock
- Length: 2:29
- Label: Capitol
- Songwriter: Bob Seger
- Producer: Punch Andrews

Bob Seger singles chronology
"Innervenus Eyes" (1969)	"Lucifer" (1970)	"Lookin' Back" (1971)

"Lucifer" is a song written by Bob Seger featured on the album Mongrel. It reached #84 on the Pop Singles chart in 1970. Many Seger fans consider this to be one of Seger's best. Ben Edmonds, in his review of Mongrel, called "Lucifer" "easily the strongest cut on the record, and a great song in its own right. It's simple, straightforward rock: the band (especially the organ) shows a clear comprehension of the song's rhythmical movement." The Bob Seger System performed this song on the TV show Upbeat, which was a syndication of musical performances taped at the WEWS studios in Cleveland, Ohio, with host Don Webster. In 2009, a clip of the song was used in the sixth-season finale of Entourage, episode "Give a Little Bit." In 2021, "Lucifer" was covered by Deep Purple, on their album, Turning to Crime.

== Writing ==
According to the "Lost Venues - Detroit" Website, December, 1968 the Bob Seger System played at the teen nightclub Something Different in Southfield, Michigan—one of many metropolitan Detroit teen nightclubs the band's manager, Punch Andrews operated. March 21 and 22, 1969 Albert King played at the same venue. April, 1969 the Bob Seger System released Ramblin' Gamblin' Man. June 7, 1969 the Bob Seger System returned to Something Different. August, 1970 the album Mongrel was released, which included "Lucifer". Besides making a reference to Albert King's "Crosscut Saw" from 1966, Seger refers back to the Ramblin' Gamblin' Man album multiple times:

- "Ramblin', Gamblin', Lovin', Shovin'"
- "Lucy Blue, Chicago Green, I'll love 'em 'til they thaw"

Lucy Blue and Chicago Green are both characters who appear on RGM. Lucy Blue is seen in "Tales of Lucy Blue," and Chicago Green appears in "Down Home". Rather than be an ode to darkness, the song "Lucifer" is a defense. Bob is defending himself (and possibly the band) against those who would disparage him (and his hard-driving musical style) with such a harsh nickname: "You can call me 'Lucifer' if you think you should [but] I know I'm [a] good [musician (and person)]."

== Reception ==
Cash Box called it "one of [Seger's] live appearance favorites filled with a driving rhythm and searing vocal."

== Chart performance ==
Chart (1970)	Peak position
U.S. Billboard Hot 100	84
