= Katmandu (song) =

Single by Bob Seger

from the album Beautiful Loser
- B-side: "Nutbush City Limits"
- Released: 1975
- Genre: Rock
- Length: 6:09; 3:16 (single edit)
- Label: Capitol
- Songwriter: Bob Seger
- Producers: Bob Seger and Muscle Shoals Rhythm Section

Bob Seger singles chronology
"Beautiful Loser" (1975)	"Katmandu" (1975)	"Nutbush City Limits" (1976)

"Katmandu" is a song written and recorded by American rock artist Bob Seger. It was initially released on his 1975 studio album Beautiful Loser, which became the first of ten consecutive platinum albums for Seger. The song was later featured on his live album Live Bullet. The single edit reached number 43 on the US chart, becoming Seger's most successful single since "Ramblin' Gamblin' Man". The song was featured in the soundtracks of the 1985 film Mask, the 16th episode of Freaks and Geeks, the tenth episode of the eighth season of Supernatural, and in the 2009 documentary Journey to Everest.

== Content ==
The song refers to the city Kathmandu, the capital of Nepal, although there is no evidence that Seger visited Kathmandu before 1991. After the Nepali earthquake of 2015, Seger said his "heart went out" to the city.

Seger said of the song:

That’s kind of like "Turn the Page." It’s an exasperated song. It’s like: “I’m never gonna make it, I’m just gonna go to Katmandu”. I’d always loved the group Little Feat. They were on Warner Bros., and that’s why I wanted to be on that label. I was on the label for two years. Since then I’ve bought the catalog back from them. Talk about getting lost in the woods. They had so many acts on the label that you just got lost in the shuffle. I felt like a number. Katmandu was written at the end of that nine-year or 10-year period where I was going nowhere fast. Glenn [Frey] and Don [Henley] told me that the Beautiful Loser album was the first little step in the right direction for me. Then the next step after that was Live Bullet, which was a huge step. And the next step was Night Moves, which was an even huger step. By 1980 both records were at six million, and they kept selling continuously. Beautiful Loser was a transitional album, and in the song "Katmandu" I still had some of that defeatist mentality and you can hear it in there.

== Reception ==
Cash Box called it "fine, tight, rock and roll," saying the song "is punctuated with classic Chuck Berry-style guitar, down-home rockin' piano and fine vocal stylizing by Bob."

Classic Rock History critic Janey Roberts rated it as Seger's 9th best song.

== Chart performance ==
Chart (1975)	Peak position
Canadian RPM Top Singles	57
U.S. Billboard Hot 100	43
