= Sammy Hagar & Friends =

Studio album by Sammy Hagar
- Released: September 24, 2013
- Recorded: 2012–2013
- Genre: Hard rock
- Length: 41:44
- Label: Frontiers
- Producer: John Cuniberti, Sammy Hagar

Sammy Hagar chronology
Cosmic Universal Fashion (2008)	Sammy Hagar & Friends (2013)	Lite Roast (2014)

Professional ratings
Review scores
Source	Rating
Liverpool Sound and Vision	4/5 stars
Rockulus Maximus	8.5/11 stars
Metal Traveller	4.5/5 stars

Sammy Hagar & Friends is the sixteenth studio album by American hard rock musician Sammy Hagar, released on September 24, 2013, by Frontiers Records.

"I was going to do an anthology called Four Decades of Rock," he told Classic Rock, "cherrypicking songs from Montrose, my solo stuff, Van Halen, the stuff I've done since. I was going to write a new song for each era: a song like 'Rock Candy' by Montrose, a song like 'Red' from my solo years, a Van Halen-type song… [But] I went to license the Van Halen songs, and those two knuckleheads [Eddie and Alex Van Halen] wouldn't okay it… I could have hired an attorney and done it anyway, because I own thirty per cent of that music. But that would have got a bunch of ugly press."

== Track listing ==
No.	Title	Writer(s)	Friend(s)	Length
1.	"Winding Down"	Sammy Hagar	Taj Mahal	2:29
2.	"Not Going Down"	Jay Buchanan	Denny Carmassi / Bill Church	4:57
3.	"Personal Jesus" (Originally recorded by Depeche Mode)	Martin Gore	Michael Anthony / Neal Schon / Chad Smith	4:50
4.	"Father Sun"	Sammy Hagar	Carmassi / Aaron Hagar	3:41
5.	"Knockdown Dragout"	Dennis Hill, Ken Livingston, Kyle Homme, Stephen Garvy, Kevin Baldes, Sammy Hagar	Carmassi / Kid Rock / Joe Satriani	2:17
6.	"Ramblin' Gamblin' Man" (Originally recorded by Bob Seger)	Bob Seger	The Waboritas	2:36
7.	"Bad On Fords and Chevrolets"	Ronnie Dunn, Ray Wylie Hubbard	Ronnie Dunn	3:20
8.	"Margaritaville" (Originally recorded by Jimmy Buffett)	Jimmy Buffett	Toby Keith	4:53
9.	"All We Need Is an Island"	Sammy Hagar	Mickey Hart / Nancy Wilson	2:42
10.	"Going Down" (Live in studio, take 1)	Don Nix	Anthony / Schon / Smith	4:25
11.	"Space Station #5" (live, deluxe edition bonus track)	Sammy Hagar and Ronnie Montrose	Carmassi / Church / Satriani	5:34
12.	"Bad Motor Scooter" (live, pre-order bonus track)	Sammy Hagar	Carmassi / Church / Satriani	4:39
Total length:				41:44

== Notes ==
- The live bonus tracks were recorded at "A Concert for Ronnie Montrose", a posthumous tribute show at the Regency Ballroom in San Francisco, California on April 27, 2012.

== Personnel ==
Winding Down

- Backing Vocals – Mona Gnader, Vic Johnson
- Electric Guitar, Dobro, Acoustic Guitar – Dave Zirbel
- Lead Vocals – Taj Mahal
- Lead Vocals, Acoustic Guitar [2nd] – Sammy Hagar
- Percussion – John Cuniberti
- Written-By – Sammy Hagar

- 2:30 2 Not Going Down

- Backing Vocals – Claytoven Richardson, Omega Rae, Sandy Griffith
- Bass – Bill Church
- Drums – Denny Carmassi
- Guitar – Vic Johnson
- Lap Steel Guitar – Dave Zirbel
- Lead Vocals, Guitar – Sammy Hagar
- Written-By – Jay Buchanan

- 4:57 3 Personal Jesus

- Backing Vocals – Claytoven Richardson, Omega Rae, Sandy Griffith
- Bass – Michael Anthony
- Drums – Chad Smith
- Guitar – Neal Schon
- Lead Vocals – Sammy Hagar
- Written-By – Martin Gore

- 4:50 4 Father Sun

- Accordion – Andre Thierry
- Backing Vocals – Aaron Hagar, Erica Cuniberti, John Cuniberti
- Bass – Mona Gnader
- Drums, Percussion – Denny Carmassi
- Guitar – Vic Johnson
- Lead Vocals, Backing Vocals, Lap Steel Guitar, Guitar – Sammy Hagar
- Mandolin – James DePrato
- Written-By – Sammy Hagar

- 3:41 5 Knockdown Dragout

- Backing Vocals – Mona Gnader
- Drums, Backing Vocals – Denny Carmassi
- Guitar [Solo], Backing Vocals – Joe Satriani
- Guitar, Backing Vocals – Vic Johnson
- Lead and Backing Vocals – Kid Rock
- Lead and Backing Vocals, Guitar – Sammy Hagar
- Percussion, Backing Vocals – John Cuniberti
- Written By – Stephen Garvy, Dennis Hill, Ken Livingston, Kevin Baldes, Kyle Homme, Sammy Hagar

- 2:17 6 Ramblin' Gamblin' Man

- Backing Vocals – Claytoven Richardson, Omega Rae, Sandy Griffith
- Bass, Backing Vocals – Mona Gnader
- Drums – David Lauser
- Guitar, Backing Vocals – Vic Johnson
- Lead Vocals, Guitar [Solo], Guitar – Sammy Hagar
- Organ – Susie Davis
- Percussion – John Cuniberti
- Written-By – Bob Seger

- 2:36 7 Bad On Fords And Chevrolets

- Bass, Backing Vocals – Mona Gnader
- Drums – David Lauser
- Guitar, Backing Vocals – Vic Johnson
- Lap Steel Guitar – Dave Zirbel
- Lead Vocals, Backing Vocals – Ronnie Dunn
- Lead Vocals, Guitar – Sammy Hagar
- Piano – Austin De Lone
- Written-By – Ray Wylie Hubbard, Ronnie Dunn

- 3:21 8 Margaritaville

- Accordion, Electric Piano – Austin De Lone
- Backing Vocals – Caroline De Lone, Mona Gnader
- Bass [Upright] – Ruth Davies
- Drums – Paul Revelli
- Guitar – Bill Kirchen
- Lead Vocals – Sammy Hagar, Toby Keith
- Percussion – Karl Perraza
- Written-By – Jimmy Buffett

- 4:53 9 All We Need Is An Island

- Drums – Mickey Hart
- Pedal Steel Guitar, Ukulele [Tahitian] – Dave Zirbel
- Vocals, Acoustic Guitar – Sammy Hagar
- Vocals, Backing Vocals – Nancy Wilson
- Written-By – Sammy Hagar

- 2:43 10 Going Down (Live In Studio-Take 1)

- Bass – Michael Anthony
- Drums – Chad Smith
- Guitar – Neal Schon
- Lead Vocals – Sammy Hagar
- Written-By – Don Nix

== Charts ==
Chart (2013)	Peak position
Belgian Albums (Ultratop Flanders)	130
German Albums (Offizielle Top 100)	79
Scottish Albums (OCC)	78
Swiss Albums (Schweizer Hitparade)	97
UK Albums (OCC)	92
UK Independent Albums (OCC)	22
UK Rock & Metal Albums (OCC)	11
US Billboard 200	23
US Independent Albums (Billboard)	2
US Top Hard Rock Albums (Billboard)	4
US Top Rock Albums (Billboard)	8
US Indie Store Album Sales (Billboard)	21
