= Mongrel (The Bob Seger System album) =

Studio album by the Bob Seger System
- Released: August 1970
- Studios: GM Studios, East Detroit, Michigan
- Genre: Rock
- Length: 33:44
- Label: Capitol
- Producer: Punch Andrews

The Bob Seger System chronology
| Noah (1969) | Mongrel (1970) | Brand New Morning (1971) |

Singles from Mongrel
- 1. "Lucifer" Released: April 1970

Professional ratings
Review scores
| Source | Rating |
|---|---|
| AllMusic | 4.5/5 stars |
| Christgau's Record Guide | C+ |

Mongrel is the third studio album by American rock band the Bob Seger System, released in 1970. During its four-week run on the Billboard 200 chart, the album entered the chart at the end of October 1970, then rose to number 171 two weeks later.

== Critical reception ==
Rolling Stone reviewed Mongrel on January 7, 1971. Ben Edmonds called the album "...easily Seger's best work to date, but there are still some crucial musical problems he must come to grips with if he is to realize the tremendous potential he displayed on his earlier Cameo-Parkway singles (most notably 'Heavy Music' and 'Persecution Smith')." Edmonds continued: "Seger writes marvelous rock and roll songs in the virile 1965 mold, somewhat of a lost art these days." The band itself, however, he said, is "like Mountain" and "often degenerates into 'heavy' overstatements of the most clichéd sort." Edmonds called "Lucifer" the strongest cut on the album, but his review may have had a dampening effect on sales.

== Track listing ==
All tracks are written by Bob Seger, except where noted.

Side A
| No. | Title | Length |
|---|---|---|
| 1. | "Song to Rufus" | 2:46 |
| 2. | "Evil Edna" | 3:12 |
| 3. | "Highway Child" | 2:49 |
| 4. | "Big River" | 3:10 |
| 5. | "Mongrel" | 2:22 |
| 6. | "Lucifer" | 2:27 |

Side B
| No. | Title | Writer(s) | Length |
|---|---|---|---|
| 7. | "Teachin' Blues" | | 1:59 |
| 8. | "Leanin on My Dream" | | 3:16 |
| 9. | "Mongrel Too" | | 4:09 |
| 10. | "River Deep, Mountain High" | Jeff Barry, Ellie Greenwich, Phil Spector | 7:24 |

== Personnel ==
- Bob Seger – lead guitar, vocals
- Dan Honaker – bass, guitar, vocals
- Pep Perrine – percussion, drums, vocals
- Dan Watson – organ, piano, vocals
- Bob Schultz – organ, saxophone, vocals

== Production ==
- Producers: Punch Andrews, Bob Seger
- Engineer: Jim Bruzzese, Greg Miller
- Design: Thomas Weschler
- Cover art: Thomas Weschler
- Photography: Thomas Weschler

== Charts ==
Album - Billboard (United States)

| Year | Chart | Position |
|---|---|---|
| 1970 | Pop Albums | 171 |

Singles - Billboard (United States)

| Year | Single | Chart | Position |
|---|---|---|---|
| 1970 | "Lucifer" | Pop Singles | 84 |
