= Rosalie Trombley =

Canadian radio personality (1939–2021)

- Born: September 18, 1939; Leamington, Ontario, Canada
- Died: November 23, 2021 (aged 82); Leamington, Ontario, Canada
- Occupation: Music director

Rosalie Trombley (September 18, 1939 – November 23, 2021) was a Canadian music director of Windsor, Ontario AM Top 40 radio station CKLW, also known as "The Big 8". She was known for her ability to select songs that would later become big hits. At the time, she was one of the few female music directors in AM Top 40; CKLW's listenership reached across the Detroit–Windsor transborder region, and Kal Rudman, editor of the music trade publication Friday Morning Quarterback, described Trombley as "the number one music director in the United States."

She broke numerous artists such as Alice Cooper, Aerosmith, and Bob Seger, who later wrote a song about her entitled "Rosalie".

Her influence as a music director later led to an annual award for women in broadcasting being named after her.

== Early life ==
Trombley was born in Leamington, Ontario. She worked for Bell Canada while in high school.

== Career ==
Trombley and her then-husband Clayton moved to Windsor, and she was hired in 1963 to work as a part-time switchboard operator and receptionist at CKLW. After becoming familiar with how a top 40 station worked, she accepted a position in the music library, and in the fall of 1968, she was offered a full-time position as CKLW's music director, a job she later attributed to "being in the right place at the right time."

As music director, her job was to find the songs that listeners liked best; her decision to add a song to CKLW's playlist could influence its success. Known for her "good ears", Trombley was frequently able to predict when an album track had the potential to become a hit single.

CKLW was a Windsor, Ontario-based station, but it programmed for the Detroit market in the USA; part of its programming strategy was to downplay its city of license, Windsor, Ontario, and present itself as an American station. In the late 1960s and early 1970s, With its 50,000-watt AM signal, CKLW covered Michigan, Ohio, Pennsylvania, Indiana and Illinois, as well as southwestern Ontario, Cleveland and Toledo. In the early 1970s, the station had one of the largest cumulative audiences in North America.

In the 1970s, the CRTC mandated that radio stations follow Canadian Content rules and play a certain percentage of Canadian music. Trombley picked the Canadian records she felt stood the best chance of becoming hits for airplay. In some cases, listener response to the Canadian records the station featured led to an American single release, and occasionally a national hit, as in the case of the Skylark song "Wildflower", playing it for over three months as an album cut before its release as a single. Another example is The Carpenters' 1977 cover of Canadian band Klaatu's "Calling Occupants Of Interplanetary Craft".

With so much Canadian content, the station's popularity in the United States began to fade. Trombley acknowledged in a 1982 Billboard magazine article that her station no longer had the "clout" it once did, but despite that, CKLW continued to play a role in breaking hits.

Trombley served as music director of CKLW from 1968 to 1984, through the station's top 40 years and into the era when CKLW changed format to appeal to an older audience. After leaving the station, she worked at WLTI-FM in Detroit and then CKEY in Toronto.

== Influence ==
Many recording artists visited Trombley to promote their latest single releases, and the walls of her office were lined with gold records. Among the artists she is credited with helping are Earth, Wind and Fire; Elton John; Kiss; Ted Nugent; The Guess Who, The Poppy Family and Bob Seger. Among the hits that CKLW was first to play were the Guess Who's "These Eyes" and the Main Ingredient's 1972 hit "Everybody Plays the Fool". She persuaded Elton John to release "Bennie and the Jets" as a single, because she believed, correctly, that it would be a cross-over hit, appealing to both black and white listeners.

Trombley was immortalized by Bob Seger in his 1973 song "Rosalie", which appeared on the Back in '72 album ("She's got the tower, she's got the power / Rosalie"). (The song was later covered by Irish band Thin Lizzy, on their 1975 album Fighting and again on their 1978 LP Live and Dangerous.) Seger wrote it in frustration at not being able to get his songs played on CKLW at that time. There are differing stories concerning Trombley's reaction to the tune: some claim she hated "Rosalie" and refused to allow her DJs to play it; others insist the programmer was flattered, but worried about a potential conflict of interest. Either way, CKLW never played "Rosalie", although the song did receive spins on other Detroit stations, as well as Top 40 outlets as far away as Idaho.

== Legacy ==
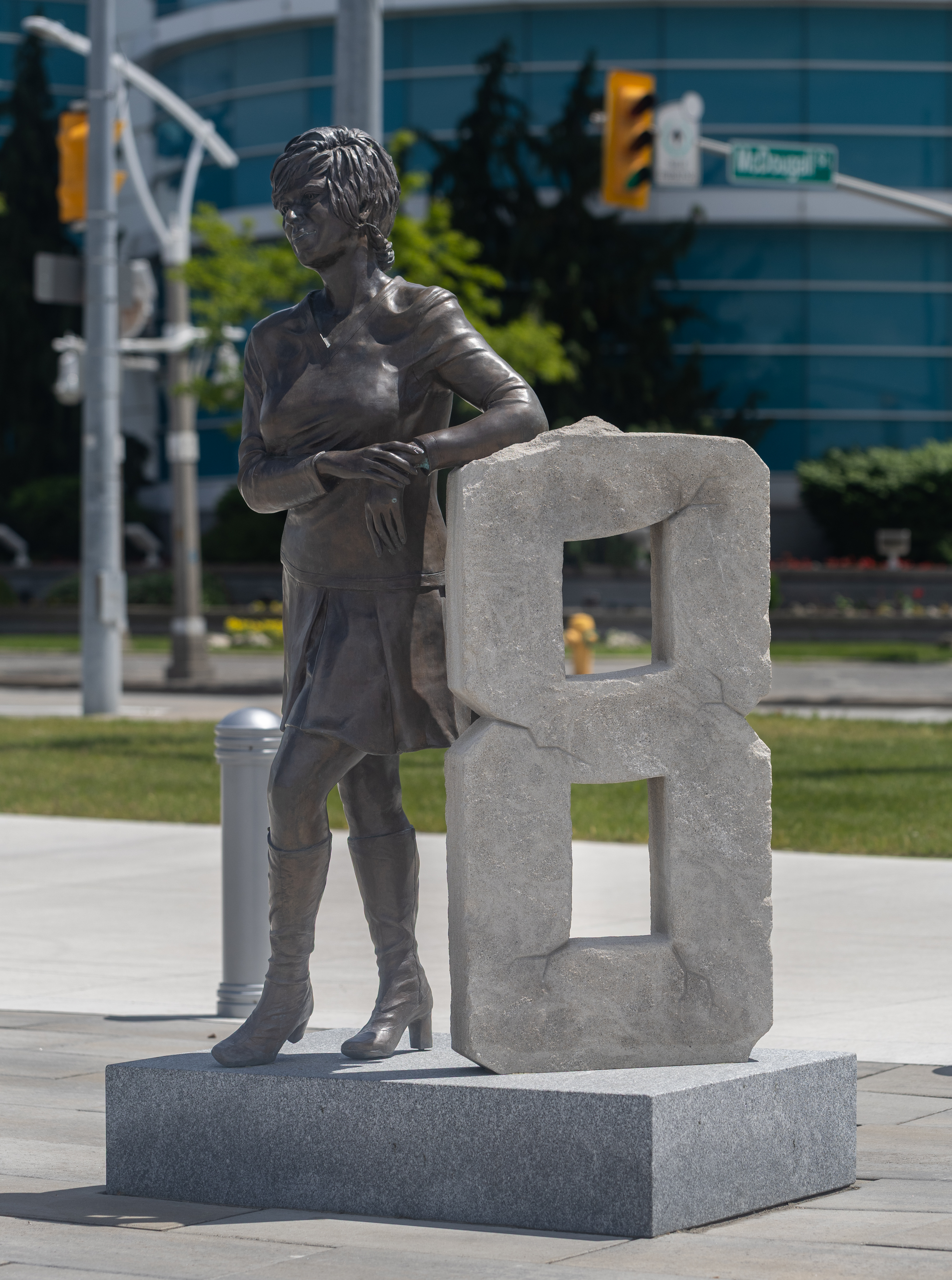
Statue of Trombley, Windsor, Ontario

Trombley granted interviews only occasionally, including for the 1971 WDRQ documentary The History of Detroit Radio and for the 2004 documentary Radio Revolution: The Rise and Fall of the Big 8, produced by Toronto-based Markham Films. Much of the documentary was about her contributions and influence. The film's co-producer Eugene McNamara noted that unlike others who worked at CKLW, she did not go on to additional successes after her years at the Big 8. "I think it was because she was a woman in a male-dominated environment," McNamara stated.

In April 1992, Trombley was awarded a Lifetime Achievement Award at the first annual Motor City Music Awards, held in Detroit.

The "Rosalie Trombley Award", which honours women who have made their mark in broadcasting, is presented during Canadian Music Week.

Trombley was inducted into the Motor City (Detroit) Rock and Roll Hall of Fame and the Canadian Music Week Broadcasters Hall of Fame.

On June 14, 2011, a scholarship in Trombley's name was announced by St. Clair College, for their Music Theatre Performance program. On June 16 of that same year, Rosalie received an honorary diploma from the Music Theatre Performance program.

In April 2016, Trombley received the Walt Grealis Special Achievement Award at the 2016 Juno Awards.

Trombley died from complications of Alzheimer's disease on November 23, 2021, at the age of 82 in a long term care centre in Leamington.

A statue of Trombley was unveiled in Windsor along its riverfront, in September 2023.
