= The Fire Inside (Bob Seger song) =

1991 single by Bob Seger

Single by Bob Seger & the Silver Bullet Band

from the album The Fire Inside
- Released: 1991
- Length: 5:56 (album version)
- Label: Captiol
- Songwriter: Bob Seger
- Producers: Punch Andrews, Bob Seger

Bob Seger & the Silver Bullet Band singles chronology
| "The Real Love" (1991) | "The Fire Inside" (1991) | "In Your Time" (1994) |

"The Fire Inside" is a song by Bob Seger. Although the song was released as a single in 1991, a music video was remastered in 2020.

The song reached No. 45 on the Billboard Adult Contemporary chart and No. 6 on the Album Rock Track chart. It reached No. 54 in Germany and No. 36 in Canada.

== Personnel ==
Credits are adapted from the liner notes of The Fire Inside.

- Bob Seger – vocals
- Roy Bittan – piano
- Bob Glaub – bass
- Russ Kunkel – drums
- Steve Lukather – acoustic guitar
- Jai Winding – organ

== Charts ==
- US AC - 45
- US Mainstream Rock - 6
- Canada - 36
- Canada AC - 35
- Germany - 54
