= Noah (The Bob Seger System album) =

Studio album by The Bob Seger System
- Released: September 1969
- Recorded: 1969
- Studio: GM Studios, East Detroit, Michigan
- Genre: Hard rock; psychedelic rock
- Length: 34:25
- Label: Capitol
- Producer: Punch Andrews

The Bob Seger System chronology
| Ramblin' Gamblin' Man (1969) | Noah (1969) | Mongrel (1970) |

Singles from Noah
- 1. "Noah" Released: July 1969; 2. "Innervenus Eyes" Released: October 1969

Professional ratings
Review scores
| Source | Rating |
|---|---|
| AllMusic | 2/5 stars |

Noah is the second studio album by American rock band The Bob Seger System, released in September 1969. Seger was displeased with the album as it was the label's intention to showcase Tom Neme as the voice of the band. Seger contemplated quitting music altogether after this album. It has never been reissued on a legitimate U.S. CD by Capitol and probably never will be, as Seger disavows it. It does, however, contain the Seger title song, "Noah", which was issued as a single in July 1969.

The album features the song "Death Row", which was a holdover from the Ramblin' Gamblin' Man sessions. It was originally issued as the B-side of the single "2 + 2 = ?".

== Track listing ==
Side A
| No. | Title | Writer(s) | Length |
|---|---|---|---|
| 1. | "Noah" | Bob Seger | 3:02 |
| 2. | "Innervenus Eyes" | Dan Honaker, Pep Perrine, Seger | 2:48 |
| 3. | "Lonely Man" | Tom Neme | 3:14 |
| 4. | "Loneliness Is a Feeling" | Neme | 3:03 |
| 5. | "Cat" | Honaker, Perrine, Seger | 6:20 |

Side B
| No. | Title | Writer(s) | Length |
|---|---|---|---|
| 6. | "Jumpin' Humpin' Hip Hypocrite" | Neme | 3:13 |
| 7. | "Follow the Children" | Neme | 3:28 |
| 8. | "Lennie Johnson" | Honaker | 3:06 |
| 9. | "Paint Them a Picture Jane" | Neme | 4:08 |
| 10. | "Death Row" | Seger | 2:59 |

== Personnel ==
The Bob Seger System

- Bob Seger – lead (1-5, 10) and backing vocals, lead and rhythm guitars
- Tom Neme – lead and rhythm guitars, backing and lead (4, 6, 7, 9) vocals, piano
- Bob Schultz – organ, backing vocals, piano, saxophone
- Dan Honaker – bass, backing and lead (8) vocals
- Pep Perrine – drums, percussion

== Production ==
- Engineer: Jim Bruzzese
