= Shame on the Moon =

Single by Bob Seger & The Silver Bullet Band

from the album The Distance
- B-side: "House Behind the House"
- Released: November 30, 1982
- Genre: Rock, country rock
- Length: 4:55
- Label: Capitol
- Songwriter: Rodney Crowell
- Producer: Jimmy Iovine

Bob Seger & The Silver Bullet Band singles chronology
"Feel Like a Number" (1982)	"Shame on the Moon" (1982)	"Even Now" (1983)

"Shame on the Moon" is a song written and recorded by Rodney Crowell for his 1981 self-titled album. It was covered by Bob Seger & the Silver Bullet Band as the lead single from their 1982 album The Distance.

Glenn Frey joined Seger on background harmony vocals on the song. The song spent four weeks at number two on the Billboard Hot 100 pop singles chart and topped the adult contemporary chart. The song went to number 15 on the country chart in early 1983, marking Seger's only top 40 entry on that chart.

== Critical reception ==
Billboard magazine reviewed the song favorably, saying that Seger's "trademark acoustic guitar sets the tone, followed by an easygoing vocal and loping rhythm." Cash Box said that "fans of Bob Seger's ballad side...will unquestionably take delight in this mostly-acoustic country/pop Rodney Crowell tune" since Seger "makes it his own." Kerrang! said, "This track is really the pits. Deadly dull. Sounds like he's had to resort to re-writing his back catalogue with all the style and grave of a sausage factory."

Classic Rock History critic Janey Roberts rated it as Seger's 15th best song.

== Bob Seger's comments ==
Speaking with Creem in 1983, Seger said: "It's more like a western song — a cowboy song — than it is a country & western song. And the track is flawless, the best and tightest track on the album. We cut it in like two hours, and everyone decided it was the miracle track. But then we had to decide whether to use it or not because The Distance was going to be a real rock album. I purposely didn't write any medium-tempo songs for this one because I wanted it to be hard rocking with a few ballads for pacing. But we figured we'd throw it on and see what happened. The next thing we know, the Capitol guys are saying, 'That's the single!' (laughs) Fine! Whatever it takes! So thank you, Rodney. It's a great song, and I'm beholden to the lad for writing it."

== Personnel ==
Credits are adapted from the liner notes of Seger's 2003 Greatest Hits 2 compilation.

- Bob Seger – lead vocals, harmony vocals

The Silver Bullet Band

- Chris Campbell – bass
- Craig Frost – organ

Additional musicians

- Drew Abbott – guitar
- Laura Creamer – background vocals
- Glenn Frey – harmony vocals
- Bobbye Hall – percussion
- Russ Kunkel – drums
- Shaun Murphy – background vocals
- Bill Payne – piano
- Joan Sliwin – background vocals
- Waddy Wachtel – guitar

Production

- Jimmy Iovine – producer

== Chart performance ==
Chart (1982–1983)	Peak position
Australia (Kent Music Report)	38
Canadian RPM Top Singles	8
Canadian RPM Adult Contemporary	1
Canadian RPM Country Tracks	10
French Singles Chart	58
German Singles Chart	50
New Zealand Singles Chart	24
South African Singles Chart	15
Spanish Singles Chart	27
US Billboard Hot 100	2
US Adult Contemporary (Billboard)	1
US Hot Country Songs (Billboard)	15

Year-end chart (1983)	Rank
Canada Top Singles (RPM)	63
US Top Pop Singles (Billboard)	14

== Cover versions ==
- Mac Davis covered the song for his 1982 album Forty 82.
- Karen Brooks covered the song for her 1982 album Walk On.
- Tanya Tucker covered the song for her 1983 album Changes.
- Willie Nelson covered the song for his 2025 album Oh What a Beautiful World.

== See also ==
- List of Billboard Adult Contemporary number ones of 1983
