= The Distance (Bob Seger album) =

Studio album by Bob Seger & the Silver Bullet Band
- Released: December 13, 1982
- Genre: Heartland rock
- Length: 41:05
- Label: Capitol
- Producer: Jimmy Iovine

Bob Seger & the Silver Bullet Band chronology
Nine Tonight (1981)	The Distance (1982)	Like a Rock (1986)

Singles from The Distance
- 1. "Shame on the Moon" Released: November 30, 1982; 2. "Even Now" Released: March 1983; 3. "Roll Me Away" Released: May 10, 1983

Professional ratings
Review scores
Source	Rating
AllMusic	4/5 stars

The Distance is the twelfth studio album by US-American rock singer Bob Seger, released in December 1982. It peaked at No. 5 on Billboard's album chart and sold close to two million copies in the United States.

Seger, influenced by the Woody Allen film Annie Hall, originally intended the album to be built around the theme of relationships but eventually that fell apart when Seger decided that sticking to the theme too strictly would make the album "maudlin". Several songs based on the original theme made it on the album: the hit single "Even Now", "Love’s the Last to Know", "House Behind a House" and the album closer "Little Victories".

The album's lead single, "Shame on the Moon", was one of Seger's biggest hits, holding at no. 2 for four weeks on the Billboard Hot 100. It also hit No. 1 Adult Contemporary and crossed over to No. 15 Country.

Capitol Records had stopped manufacturing albums in the 8-track tape cartridge format by the time this album was released. However, Seger asked the label to include that format for this album, knowing that many of his fans still used 8-track players.

== Track listing ==
All tracks are written by Bob Seger, except where noted.

No.	Title	Writer(s)	Length
1.	"Even Now"		4:31
2.	"Makin' Thunderbirds"		2:58
3.	"Boomtown Blues"		3:38
4.	"Shame on the Moon"	Rodney Crowell	4:55
5.	"Love's the Last to Know"		4:26
6.	"Roll Me Away"		4:39
7.	"House Behind a House"		4:00
8.	"Comin' Home"		6:06
9.	"Little Victories"		5:52

== Personnel ==
- Bob Seger – vocals (all tracks), guitar (3, 8, 9), harmony vocals (4)

The Silver Bullet Band

- Chris Campbell – bass guitar (1–7, 9)
- Craig Frost – organ (1, 3–6, 9), piano (2)
- Alto Reed – saxophone (1–3, 7, 8)

Muscle Shoals Rhythm Section

- Barry Beckett – piano (8), organ (8)
- Pete Carr – guitar (8)
- Roger Hawkins – drums (8)
- David Hood – bass guitar (8)
- Randy McCormick – electric piano (8)

Additional musicians

- Drew Abbott – guitar (2, 4)
- Roy Bittan – piano (1, 6)
- Michael Boddicker – synthesizer (6)
- Don Felder – guitar (1, 3)
- Bobbye Hall – percussion (1–4, 6)
- Davey Johnstone – guitar (5)
- Danny Kortchmar – guitar (7)
- Russ Kunkel – drums (1–7, 9)
- Bill Payne – piano (4, 5), synthesizer (8)
- Waddy Wachtel – guitar (2, 4, 6, 7, 9)

Additional vocals

- Ginger Blake – background vocals (8)
- Laura Creamer – background vocals (4, 8)
- Linda Dillard – background vocals (8)
- Glenn Frey – harmony vocals (4)
- Shaun Murphy – background vocals (4, 7)
- Bonnie Raitt – harmony vocals (2)
- Joan Sliwin – background vocals (4)

Production

- Producer: Jimmy Iovine
- Engineer: Shelly Yakus

== Charts ==
=== Weekly charts ===
Chart (1983)	Peak position
Australian Albums (Kent Music Report)	13
Austrian Albums (Ö3 Austria)	19
Canada Top Albums/CDs (RPM)	5
Dutch Albums (Album Top 100)	33
German Albums (Offizielle Top 100)	16
New Zealand Albums (RMNZ)	12
Norwegian Albums (VG-lista)	4
Swedish Albums (Sverigetopplistan)	19
UK Albums (Official Charts)	45
US Billboard 200	5

=== Year-end charts ===
Chart (1983)	Position
Canada Top Albums/CDs (RPM)	29
US Billboard 200	17

Singles

Year	Single	Chart	Position
1982	"House Behind a House"	US Top Rock Tracks	29
1983	"Boomtown Blues"	US Top Rock Tracks	11
1983	"Even Now"	US Top Rock Tracks	2
1983	"Even Now"	US Hot 100	12
1983	"Roll Me Away"	US Top Rock Tracks	13
1983	"Roll Me Away"	US Hot 100	27
1983	"Shame on the Moon"	US Adult Contemporary	1
1983	"Shame on the Moon"	US Country Singles	15
1983	"Shame on the Moon"	US Hot 100	2

== Certifications ==
Certifications for The Distance
Region	Certification	Certified units/sales
Canada (Music Canada)	2× Platinum	200,000^{^}
United States (RIAA)	Platinum	1,000,000^{^}
^{^} Shipments figures based on certification alone.
