= Even Now (Bob Seger song) =

Single by Bob Seger & the Silver Bullet Band

from the album The Distance
- B-side: "Little Victories"
- Released: March 1983
- Genre: Heartland rock
- Length: 4:31
- Label: Capitol
- Songwriter: Bob Seger
- Producer: Jimmy Iovine

Bob Seger & the Silver Bullet Band singles chronology
"Shame on the Moon" (1982)	"Even Now" (1983)	"Roll Me Away" (1983)

"Even Now" is a song written by Bob Seger that was first released on his 1982 album The Distance. It was also released as a single, backed with "Little Victories". It reached #9 on the Cash Box Top 100 chart, #12 on the Billboard Hot 100, and #2 on the Billboard Mainstream Rock chart.

== Lyrics and music ==
"Even Now" reflected Seger's original concept for The Distance of writing an album about relationships, even though he did not ultimately stick to that concept. Seger has stated that the line "Out in the distance, always within reach/There’s a crossroad where all the victims meet" was intended to set up the entire album. "Even Now" is a love song that Rolling Stone Magazine critic Dave Marsh describes it as an "[anthem] of perseverance" in that it uses "personal relationships as metaphors for a vision of the world and the way that it works and what it takes (and costs) to cope with such a place and time." It was dedicated to Seger's long-time companion at the time, Jan Dinsdale. Seger has stated "The idea is that there’s always a way you can screw up when you’re in a relationship. There’s always that little thing in the back of your mind saying, ‘I’m gonna screw up. I’m gonna go out with somebody else and lie, or whatever.’ Whatever it takes to mess up a relationship.”

Music journalist Gary Graff described it as song where Seger exults "in triumphing over adversity." Los Angeles Times critic Richard Cromelin describes it as a song about the "lasting values" in "long-held love that becomes more precious in its rebirth."

== Reception ==
When released as a single in early 1983, "Even Now" reached #9 in Cash Box, #12 on the Billboard Hot 100, and #2 on its Mainstream Rock chart.

Marsh regarded it as one of several songs on The Distance which reestablished Seger's "claim to top stature among American rockers" after what Marsh regarded as the failure of Against the Wind. UPI reporter Bruce Neyer describes it as "a remarkable testament to romantic love, written from the heart and sung with a wideopen, tear-in-the-eye sensitivity. Ottawa Citizen critic Bill Provick considers it a "routine mid-tempo rocker" and describes the refrain as being "almost whiny." Cash Box called it "a tribute to a special person who accompanies one through the journey" and noted a resemblance to Seger's earlier hit single "Hollywood Nights." Billboard said that it shows the "all-stops-out high-energy rock 'n' roller" side of Seger but that "melody and sentiment still surface."

== Charts ==
Chart (1983)	Peak position
Canadian RPM Top Singles	35
U.S. Billboard Hot 100	12
U.S. Billboard Top Rock Tracks	2

== "Little Victories" ==
"Little Victories," another song written by Seger that was first released on The Distance, was released as the B-side of the "Even Now" single. "Little Victories" was also part of the original concept for The Distance and has a similar theme to "Even Now." Marsh also regards "Little Victories" as a love song and an anthem of perseverance, elaborating that when Seger sings the lines "Every time when you keep control when you're cut off at the knees/Every time you take a punch and still stand at ease" that "he is obviously singing to every broken worker back home in Michigan as much as to fellow brokenhearted lovers." Graff likewise regards "Little Victories" as an exultation in triumph over adversity. Cromelin describes it as a "wonderfully affirmative and consoling conclusion" to The Distance and compares its sound to that of Creedence Clearwater Revival. On the other hand, Provick thinks it sounds like "play-by-numbers Bob Seger Rock."

Seger has stated that an inspiration for the song was an incident when he and Jan had separated for a few days and he was devastated. He said "I wrote that to be a harrowing song. It’s about those first couple of days after something falls apart, when you’re close to a bad, almost suicidal depression. That happened to me and Jan a few times, but we got it together. One time I had to go into therapy, and one time she had to go into therapy, because we didn’t realize what we were doing to each other."
