= 2 + 2 = ? =

1968 single by Bob Seger

- German release picture sleeve

Single by the Bob Seger System

from the album Ramblin' Gamblin' Man
- B-side: "Death Row"
- Released: January 1968
- Recorded: January 1968
- Genre: Hard rock; garage rock
- Length: 2:45
- Label: Capitol
- Songwriter: Bob Seger
- Producers: The Bob Seger System and Punch

The Bob Seger System singles chronology
"Heavy Music" (1967)	"2 + 2 = ?" (1968)	"Ramblin' Gamblin' Man" (1968)

"2 + 2 = ?" is a single by the Bob Seger System from their debut album Ramblin' Gamblin' Man, released in January 1968 on Capitol Records. It is an anti-Vietnam War song. The title is a reference to the 2 + 2 = 5 mathematical falsehood of the novel 1984 by George Orwell.

== History ==
Framed around a central, Animals-esque hard riff driven by bass guitar, bass drum, and a fuzz guitar line, "2 + 2 = ?" is an explicit protest against the United States' role in the Vietnam War and the drafting of young men to serve in it who will end up "buried in the mud, of a foreign jungle land". It also captures the general generational divide of the time:

And you stand and call me "upstart" ...
I ain't saying I'm a genius;
Two plus two is on my mind –
Two plus two is on my mind.

Cash Box called it "hard rock blues" with "lyrics that are likely to grab the teen listening fancy, strong instrumental thrust and a very fine vocal showing". AllMusic writes that "2 + 2" is "a frightening, visceral song that stands among the best anti-Vietnam protests". Music historian and editor of the Vietnam War Song Project Justin Brummer comments that by 1968 "songs began to emphasise the war’s length, military failures and growing fatality rate. Bob Seger attacked the political system in '2 + 2 = ?' (1968): 'it's the rules not the soldier that I find the real enemy.'" The original studio version had a dead stop, or sudden cut to silence, placed near the end. On the 45 version, however, there is a guitar chord added at this point in the song, because radio stations fear dead air.

It was Seger's first release with Capitol and under the Bob Seger System name. But as with much of Seger's early efforts up to that point, the single was a hit in his native Detroit but went unnoticed almost everywhere else in the US. In Canada, it was actually a minor chart hit, peaking at number 79.

The song was subsequently included on Seger's April 1969 album Ramblin' Gamblin' Man. There, any concessions for radio were removed.

Alternative/garage rocker and fellow Detroiter Jack White was a fan of early Seger and in an interview he once said that "2 + 2" was his favorite song; writers have speculated that it may have been the inspiration behind the White Stripes' 2003 hit "Seven Nation Army" and its bass line.

== See also ==
- List of anti-war songs
