= Face the Promise =

Album by Bob Seger

Studio album by Bob Seger
- Released: September 12, 2006
- Recorded: 2000–2006
- Studios: Ocean Way, Nashville
- Genre: Country rock
- Length: 43:05
- Label: Capitol
- Producer: Bob Seger ("Real Mean Bottle" co-produced with Kid Rock)

Bob Seger chronology
Greatest Hits 2 (2003)	Face the Promise (2006)	Early Seger Vol. 1 (2009)

Singles from Face the Promise
- 1. "Wait for Me" Released: July 2006; 2. "Little Jane" Released: July 23, 2026

Professional ratings
Review scores
Source	Rating
AllMusic	4/5 stars
Entertainment Weekly	B
Jam!	3/5 stars

Face the Promise is the sixteenth studio album by the American rock musician Bob Seger. The album was originally planned to be released in 2004, was delayed to 2005, and was officially released on September 12, 2006. It is his first new studio album since It's a Mystery in 1995 and is Seger's first studio album not to be credited to "Bob Seger and the Silver Bullet Band" since Beautiful Loser in 1975. It took Seger six years to finish Face the Promise. The first single, "Wait For Me", was premiered in July 2006.

The album was certified platinum in the United States.

== Track listing ==
All tracks are written by Bob Seger except "Real Mean Bottle", written by Vince Gill.

No.	Title	Length
1.	"Wreck This Heart"	3:53
2.	"Wait for Me"	3:42
3.	"Face the Promise"	3:18
4.	"No Matter Who You Are"	3:40
5.	"Are You"	3:35
6.	"Simplicity"	3:59
7.	"No More"	2:58
8.	"Real Mean Bottle" (feat. Kid Rock)	3:05
9.	"Won't Stop"	3:19
10.	"Between"	4:48
11.	"The Answer's in the Question" (feat. Patty Loveless)	3:41
12.	"The Long Goodbye"	3:07

2026 Expanded edition bonus tracks
No.	Title	Length
13.	"Time"
14.	"Little Jane"	4:52
15.	"Red Eye to Memphis" (previously released as an iTunes exclusive bonus track)
16.	"Let Me Try"

== Expanded edition ==
To celebrate the album's 20th anniversary, a remastered version of the album (remastered by Robert Vosgien) featuring new artwork and a 12-page book, will be released on September 18, 2026 on vinyl for the first time. Face the Promise: Expanded Edition will feature three unreleased songs: "Little Jane", "Let Me Try" and "Time" along with the previously exclusive to iTunes bonus track, "Red Eye to Memphis". "Little Jane" was released on July 23, 2026 to promote the release.

== Personnel ==
- Bernie Barlow – backing vocals
- Eddie Bayers – drums
- Bekka Bramlett – backing vocals
- Steve Brewster – drums
- David Cole – percussion
- J. T. Corenflos – electric guitar, acoustic guitar
- Laura Creamer – backing vocals
- Eric Darken – tambourine
- Kenny Greenberg – electric guitar
- Aubrey Haynie – fiddle
- Steve Herman – trumpet
- Jim Hoke – tenor saxophone
- William Huber – trombone
- John Jarvis – piano
- Kid Rock – guitar
- Randy Leago – tenor saxophone
- Paul Leim – drums, cowbell
- Sam Levine – baritone saxophone
- Patty Loveless – vocals
- Gordon Mote – piano
- Shaun Murphy – backing vocals
- Steve Nathan – piano
- Larry Paxton – bass
- Bill Payne – piano
- Michael Rhodes – bass
- Brent Rowan – electric guitar
- Biff Watson – electric guitar
- Glenn Worf – bass
- Marlin Young – electric guitar
- Bob Seger – vocals, synthesizer, percussion, electric guitar, acoustic guitar

Strings

- David Angell
- Zeneba Bowers
- John Catchings
- David Davidson
- Conni Ellisor
- Carl Gorodetzky
- Jim Grosjean
- Craig Nelson
- Carole Rabinowitz
- Pamela Sixfin
- Elisabeth Small
- Gary Vanosdale
- Mary Kathryn Vanosdale
- Matthew Walker

Production

- Produced by Bob Seger, except "Real Mean Bottle" produced by Bob Seger and Kid Rock
- Recorded by David N. Cole
- Mixed by David N. Cole and Bob Seger
- Recorded at Ocean Way Studios in Nashville except "Won't Stop" and "The Long Goodbye" recorded at Home Studios, Michigan

== Charts ==
=== Weekly charts ===
Chart (2006)	Peak position
Canadian Albums (Billboard)	6
US Billboard 200	4
US Top Rock Albums (Billboard)	2

=== Year-end charts ===
Chart (2006)	Position
US Billboard 200	142
US Top Rock Albums (Billboard)	21
Chart (2007)	Position
US Billboard 200	163

=== Singles ===
Year	Single	Peak positions	
Year	Single	US Country	US AC
2006	"Wait for Me"	52	16
2006	"Wreck This Heart"	—	—
"—" denotes a single that did not chart.

== Certifications ==
Region	Certification	Certified units/sales
Canada	Gold	50,000
United States	Platinum	1,000,000
