= Seven (Bob Seger album) =

Studio album by Bob Seger
- Released: March 1974
- Recorded: c.1973
- Studios: Quadrafonic Sound, Nashville, Tennessee
- Genre: Rock
- Length: 31:00
- Label: Palladium/Reprise
- Producers: Punch Andrews, Bob Seger

Bob Seger chronology
Back in '72 (1973)	Seven (1974)	Beautiful Loser (1975)

Seven is the seventh studio album by American rock singer-songwriter Bob Seger, released in 1974.

== Background and recording ==
Seven was the first Seger album to feature 'The Silver Bullet Band', which he would steadily rely on for the rest of his career. The album gained notorious recognition and is a fan favorite despite its rarity. The very successful tour for this album was kicked off with Seger and his newly formed Silver Bullets as the opening act for Kiss. Kiss asked Seger and the band to support them for a few shows. After seeing the band's first set, they offered Seger the rest of the tour, which gained the band much-needed recognition.

Early vinyl copies of the album featured the word 'contrasts' at the bottom of the cover, leading people to believe the album had two titles. Others believed the album was titled 'Seven Contrasts'. However, Contrasts is the name of the artwork featured on the album. The word in parentheses is simply a reference to the artwork rather than an actual subtitle or title of the record.

A later bootleg of the album released in the 1980s was entitled Seven Worlds.

== Reception ==
Professional ratings
Review scores
Source	Rating
AllMusic	5/5 stars
Christgau's Record Guide	B+

Although the album failed to make the Billboard Top 200 albums chart, the single "Get Out of Denver" reached number 80 on the Pop Singles chart. Critics and longtime Seger fans tend to regard the album as a lost classic, much like its predecessor Back in '72. For example, Stephen Thomas Erlewine of AllMusic retrospectively gave the album 5/5 stars, calling it "one of [Seger's] strongest, hardest-hitting rock records". Summing up, Erlewine wrote:

Only nine songs, lasting just over a half-hour, but it's one of the most infectious sets Seger ever cut, proving that he wasn't just a dynamite rocker, but he had the songs to match. And, again, it didn't have any success – it didn't even chart, actually. That doesn't change the fact that this is one of his very best albums.

== Track listing ==
All tracks are written by Bob Seger.

Side One
No.	Title	Length
1.	"Get Out of Denver"	2:44
2.	"Long Song Comin'"	4:30
3.	"Need Ya"	3:22
4.	"School Teacher"	2:45
5.	"Cross of Gold"	2:23

Side Two
No.	Title	Length
1.	"U.M.C. (Upper Middle Class)"	3:15
2.	"Seen a Lot of Floors"	3:00
3.	"20 Years from Now"	4:32
4.	"All Your Love"	4:28

== Personnel ==
Silver Bullet Band

- Bob Seger – guitar, vocals
- Drew Abbott – lead guitar (A5, B1, B4)
- Tom Cartmell – saxophone (A2, B2)
- Rick Manasa – organ, piano (A5, B1, B4)
- Robyn Robins – Mellotron (B4)
- Chris Campbell – bass guitar (A4, A5, B1, B4)
- Charlie Allen Martin – drums (A5, B1, B4)

Additional musicians

- Dave Doran – lead guitar (A2)
- Jim McCarty – lead guitar (A1, B2), slide guitar (A3)
- Charlie McCoy – rhythm guitar (A1, A3)
- Bill Meuller – lead guitar (A4)
- David Briggs – piano (A1–A3, B2, B3)
- John Harris – organ (B3)
- Bobby Woods – piano (B3)
- Tommy Cogbill – bass guitar (A1–A3, B2, B3)
- Kenny Buttrey – drums (A1–A3, B2, B3)
- Randy Meyers – drums (A4)

Production

- Producers: Punch Andrews, Bob Seger
- Engineer: Gene Eichelberger, Jim Bruzzese, Greg Miller
- Cover art by Thomas Weschler
- Photography by Thomas Weschler, Scott Sparling

== Charts ==
Singles – Billboard (United States)

Year	Single	Chart	Position
1974	"Get Out of Denver"	Pop Singles	80
