= Ramblin' Gamblin' Man (song) =

Single by Bob Seger System

from the album Ramblin' Gamblin' Man
- B-side: "Tales of Lucy Blue"
- Released: October 1968
- Recorded: 1968
- Length: 2:21
- Label: Capitol
- Songwriter: Bob Seger
- Producers: Punch and the Bob Seger System

Bob Seger System singles chronology
"2 + 2 = ?" (1968)	"Ramblin' Gamblin' Man" (1968)	"Ivory" (1969)

"Ramblin' Gamblin' Man" is a song by the American rock band the Bob Seger System, and written by its leader Bob Seger. The song was originally released as a single in October 1968, then as a track on the album Ramblin' Gamblin' Man in April 1969. The single fared well, reaching No. 17 on the national charts. The original studio version, released in mono, had been unavailable to the public until it was included on Seger's compilation album Ultimate Hits: Rock and Roll Never Forgets (2011). It was Bob Seger's first top 20 hit.

== Production ==
The song follows a I-♭VII-IV-I progression, a typical 1960s chord progression. The melody plays over a basic rock drum beat and an unmistakable organ riff that carry throughout the song. Seger's friend Glenn Frey, who later co-founded The Eagles, played acoustic guitar and sang back-up vocals.

Eagles drummer Don Henley said of it "It’s not really all that great a song, but your voice makes it sound like a great song."

Classic Rock History critic Janey Roberts rated it as Seger's 8th best song, saying that "it was the song that introduced the world to the iconic voice that would eventually become a rock and roll legend."

== Live ==
The Bob Seger System synched to this song on a 1960s television show called Happenin', hosted by Paul Revere. Seger continued playing the song in concert with many various bands long after the Bob Seger System disbanded. A live version of the song from an Orlando concert on May 13, 1973 exists on www.worj.com. This version features Seger's (apparently unreliable) "Borneo Band", with prominent female vocalist Shaun Murphy (then known as Stoney). Another live version appeared on the live album Live Bullet (1976), this time with the Silver Bullet Band backing Seger. The song finally dropped off of Seger's set list in 1983, but returned 23 years later during Seger's 2006-07 Face The Promise tour.

== Other versions ==
Recorded by Black Oak Arkansas for their album Balls of Fire (1976) and by Sammy Hagar for his album Sammy Hagar & Friends (2013), "Ramblin' Gamblin' Man" has also been performed in concert by such acts as Gov't Mule, The Black Keys, The Guess Who and Bruce Springsteen.

== In popular culture ==
The song was used in the adventure comedy Joe Dirt (2001), Quentin Tarantino's movie and soundtrack for Once Upon a Time in Hollywood (2019) and in episode 3 of season 4 of the series The Grand Tour. Also as the opening for season 7, episode 10 - ICED - of TV series “COLD CASE”, 1st air date Dec 13, 2009.

== Chart performance ==
Chart (1968–1969)	Peak position
Canadian Singles Chart	18
U.S. Billboard Hot 100	17
