= Ramblin' Gamblin' Man =

Studio album by the Bob Seger System
- Released: April 26, 1969
- Recorded: 1968
- Genre: Hard rock; psychedelic rock
- Length: 36:07
- Label: Capitol
- Producer: The Bob Seger System and Punch Andrews

The Bob Seger System chronology
Ramblin' Gamblin' Man (1969)	Noah (1969)

Singles from Ramblin' Gamblin' Man
- 1. "2 + 2 = ?" Released: January 1968; 2. "Ramblin' Gamblin' Man" Released: October 1968; 3. "Ivory" Released: March 1969

Professional ratings
Review scores
Source	Rating
Allmusic	4/5 stars

Ramblin' Gamblin' Man is the first studio album by American rock band the Bob Seger System, released in 1969. The original title was Tales of Lucy Blue, hence the cover art. In the liner notes, Bob Seger says (sarcastically) he later realized Lucy Blue was "Ramblin' Gamblin' Man", and so changed the title of the album. He then thanks "Doctor Fine" for this realization. (Doctor Fine being the person who made Seger change the album's name.) The original cover design for the album featured the nude figure from Botticelli's The Birth of Venus, but this too was changed for the final release.

The title track was also performed on Bob Seger and the Silver Bullet Band's live album Live Bullet.

== Track listing ==
All tracks are written by Bob Seger, except where noted. All songs arranged by the Bob Seger System and Punch Andrews.

Side A
No.	Title	Writer(s)	Length
1.	"Ramblin' Gamblin' Man"		2:21
2.	"Tales of Lucy Blue"		2:28
3.	"Ivory"		2:23
4.	"Gone"	Dan Honaker	3:28
5.	"Down Home"		3:01
6.	"Train Man"		4:06

Side B
No.	Title	Length
7.	"White Wall"	5:20
8.	"Black Eyed Girl"	6:33
9.	"2 + 2 = ?"	2:49
10.	"Doctor Fine"	1:05
11.	"The Last Song (Love Needs to Be Loved)"	3:04

== Personnel ==
The Bob Seger System

- Bob Seger – guitar, lead vocals, piano, organ
- Dan Honaker – bass, vocals, lead vocals on "Gone" & co-lead vocals "Train Man"
- Pep Perrine – drums, vocals
- Bob Schultz – organ on "Ramblin' Gamblin' Man"

Additional personnel

- Michael Erlewine – blues harp on "Down Home"
- Glenn Frey – backing vocals and acoustic guitar on "Ramblin' Gamblin' Man"
- Penny Lawyer – backing vocals

Production

- The Bob Seger System & Punch Andrews
- Engineer: Jim Bruzzese
- Liner notes: Bob Seger
- Front and Back cover illustration (LP) - Lockart

== Charts ==
Album - Billboard (United States)

Year	Chart	Position
1969	Pop Albums	62

Singles - Billboard (United States)

Year	Single	Chart	Position
1969	"Ivory"	Pop Singles	97
1969	"Ramblin' Gamblin' Man"	Pop Singles	17
