= Brand New Morning (Bob Seger album) =

Studio album by Bob Seger
- Released: October 1971
- Studio: GM Studios, East Detroit, Michigan
- Length: 33:18
- Label: Capitol
- Producer: Punch Andrews

Bob Seger chronology
Mongrel (1970)	Brand New Morning (1971)	Smokin' O.P.'s (1972)

Professional ratings
Review scores
Source	Rating
AllMusic	3/5 stars

Brand New Morning is the fourth album by American singer-songwriter Bob Seger and his first solo studio album following the departure of backing band The Bob Seger System. It was produced by Punch Andrews and released in October 1971. The album has a stripped-down acoustic sound.

This album marked the last of Seger's Capitol releases before his four year departure from Capitol. His next album with Capitol would be Beautiful Loser, released in April 1975.

== Track listing ==
All tracks are written by Bob Seger

Side one
No.	Title	Length
1.	"Brand New Morning"	3:23
2.	"Maybe Today"	3:16
3.	"Sometimes"	5:16
4.	"You Know Who You Are"	3:20
Total length:		15:15

Side two
No.	Title	Length
1.	"Railroad Days"	6:58
2.	"Louise"	2:52
3.	"Song for Him"	4:39
4.	"Something Like"	3:34
Total length:		17:53

== Personnel ==
- Bob Seger – guitar, piano, vocals

== Production ==
- Engineer: Milan Bogdan
- Mixing: Punch Andrews, Milan Bogdan, Bob Seger
- Cover photo: Thomas Weschler
