= The Fire Inside (Bob Seger album) =

Album by Bob Seger

Studio album by Bob Seger & The Silver Bullet Band
- Released: August 27, 1991
- Genre: Rock
- Length: 52:24
- Label: Capitol
- Producers: Punch Andrews; Barry Beckett; Bob Seger; Don Was

Bob Seger & The Silver Bullet Band chronology
Like a Rock (1986)	The Fire Inside (1991)	Greatest Hits (1994)

Singles from The Fire Inside
- 1. "The Real Love" Released: August 1991; 2. "The Fire Inside" Released: November 1991

Professional ratings
Review scores
Source	Rating
AllMusic	2.5/5 stars
Metal Hammer	3/5 stars
Q	3/5 stars

The Fire Inside is the fourteenth studio album by American singer-songwriter Bob Seger. The album was released by Capitol Records in 1991. It was Seger's first album of entirely new music since Like a Rock in 1986. Though credited to "The Silver Bullet Band", much of the album used guest and session musicians, with limited contributions from Silver Bullet Band members. Among the guest artists on the album are Joe Walsh, Bruce Hornsby, Roy Bittan, JD Souther, Steve Lukather, Don Was, Waddy Wachtel, Rick Vito, Mike Campbell, Patty Smyth, Lisa Germano, and Kenny Aronoff.

On release, The Fire Inside received a mixed critical reception, but was still a commercial success peaking at number 7 on the US Billboard album chart, and achieved Platinum status from the RIAA.

== Critical reception ==
Reviewing for AllMusic, critic Bret Adams wrote of the album "Overall, the 12-track album is a disappointing piecemeal effort with five different production credits, and Seger uses two Tom Waits covers and one other outside song to pad it."

== Track listing ==
All tracks are written by Bob Seger, except where noted.

The Fire Inside track listing
No.	Title	Writer(s)	Length
1.	"Take a Chance"		3:41
2.	"The Real Love"		4:40
3.	"Sightseeing"		3:39
4.	"Real at the Time"		3:53
5.	"Always in My Heart"		4:14
6.	"The Fire Inside"		5:56
7.	"New Coat of Paint"	Tom Waits	3:26
8.	"Which Way"		3:57
9.	"The Mountain"		6:45
10.	"The Long Way Home"		4:24
11.	"Blind Love"	Waits	4:23
12.	"She Can't Do Anything Wrong"	Bill Davis, Walt Richmond	3:38

"New Coat of Paint" and "The Long Way Home" were left off the album's LP release.

== Personnel ==
As listed in the liner notes.

=== Musicians ===
- Bob Seger – electric guitar (1, 4, 8, 9), acoustic guitar (3), rhythm guitar (1, 8), piano (10), electric piano (2), vocals (all tracks), choir (3), chorus (3), harmony vocals (2, 4)
- Kenny Aronoff – drums (1–3, 8, 9)
- Sweet Pea Atkinson – background vocals (2)
- Eddie Bayers – drums (4, 5)
- Barry Beckett – bridge synthesizer (5)
- Roy Bittan – piano (6)
- Sir Harry Bowens – background vocals (2)
- Bobby Bruce – violin (11)
- Rosemary Butler – background vocals (11)
- Chris Campbell – bass guitar (10, 12)
- Mike Campbell – lead guitar (2)
- Mimi Cooper – background vocals (4)
- Laura Creamer – background vocals (11)
- Thornetta Davis – background vocals (4)
- Craig Frost – organ (1, 2, 4, 8, 12), synthesizer (5, 10), piano (1, 9)
- Lisa Germano – violin (1, 3)
- Donny Gerrard – background vocals (2, 3, 11), choir (3), chorus (3)
- Bob Glaub – bass guitar (6)
- Richard Greene – violin (11)
- Richie Hayward – drums (7, 11)
- Bruce Hornsby – piano (5), accordion (3)
- James Newton Howard – Synclavier (2)
- Dann Huff – electric guitar (4, 5, 12), rhythm guitar (12)
- James "Hutch" Hutchinson – bass guitar (2, 8, 9)
- John Jorgenson – slide guitar (8)
- Russ Kunkel – drums (6)
- Steve Lukather – acoustic guitar (6), electric guitar (10)
- Donald Ray Mitchell – background vocals (2)
- Jamie Muhoberac – synthesizer (1, 2, 9)
- Shaun Murphy – background vocals (4, 11), harmony vocals (4)
- Buell Neidlinger – acoustic bass (7, 11)
- Dean Parks – acoustic guitar (11), electric guitar (7)
- Bill Payne – piano (7, 11)
- Don Potter – acoustic guitar (5)
- Alto Reed – saxophone (3, 10, 12)
- Michael Rhodes – bass guitar (4, 5)
- Walt Richmond – piano (12)
- Patty Smyth – background vocals (2, 3), choir (3), chorus (3), harmony vocals (9)
- JD Souther – background vocals (2, 3), choir (3), chorus (3)
- Fred Tackett – acoustic guitar (7, 11)
- David Teegarden – drums (10, 12)
- Rick Vito – lead guitar (1, 12), slide guitar (10, 12)
- Waddy Wachtel – acoustic guitar (3), rhythm guitar (1, 2, 8, 9)
- Don Was – bass guitar (1, 3)
- Joe Walsh – lead guitar (9)
- Oren Waters – harmony vocals (2, 3)
- Jai Winding – organ (6)

=== Production ===
- Producers: Punch Andrews, Barry Beckett, Bob Seger, Don Was
- Engineers: Allen Abrahamson, Bryant Arnett, Craig Brock, Ed Cherney, Denis Forbes, Ed Goodreau, John Kunz, Michael Mason, Justin Niebank, Thom Panunzio, Gerard Smerek, Randy Wine
- Assistant engineers: Greg Fogie, Tom Banghart, Dan Bosworth, Buzz Burrowes, Jim DeMain, John Hurley, Marnie Riley, Don Smith, Brett Swain, Don Was
- Mixing: Punch Andrews, Ed Cherney, David N. Cole, Bob Seger
- Photography: John Abeyla

== Charts ==
=== Album ===
==== Weekly charts ====
Weekly chart performance for The Fire Inside
Chart (1991)	Peak position
Australian Albums (ARIA)	99
Austrian Albums (Ö3 Austria)	33
Canada Top Albums/CDs (RPM)	10
Dutch Albums (Album Top 100)	68
German Albums (Offizielle Top 100)	23
New Zealand Albums (RMNZ)	26
Norwegian Albums (VG-lista)	7
Swedish Albums (Sverigetopplistan)	33
Swiss Albums (Schweizer Hitparade)	14
UK Albums (Official Charts)	54
US Billboard 200	7

==== Year-end charts ====
Year-end chart performance for The Fire Inside
Chart (1991)	Position
Canada Top Albums/CDs (RPM)	42

=== Singles ===
Chart performance for singles from The Fire Inside
Title	Chart (1991)	Position
"Take a Chance"	US Mainstream Rock Tracks	10
"The Fire Inside"	US Adult Contemporary	45
"The Fire Inside"	Mainstream Rock Tracks	6
"The Real Love"	US Adult Contemporary	4
"The Real Love"	US Mainstream Rock Tracks	4
"The Real Love"	US Billboard Hot 100	24

== Certifications ==
Certifications for The Fire Inside
Region	Certification	Certified units/sales
Canada (Music Canada)	Platinum	100,000^{^}
United States (RIAA)	Platinum	1,000,000^{^}
^{^} Shipments figures based on certification alone.
