= Roll Me Away =

Single by Bob Seger

from the album The Distance
- B-side: "Boomtown Blues"
- Released: May 10, 1983
- Genre: Heartland rock
- Length: 4:39
- Label: Capitol
- Songwriter: Bob Seger
- Producer: Jimmy Iovine

Bob Seger singles chronology
"Even Now" (1983)	"Roll Me Away" (1983)	"Old Time Rock and Roll" (1983)

"Roll Me Away" is a song written by American rock artist Bob Seger on the album The Distance by Bob Seger and the Silver Bullet Band. The song was used as Seger's opening song on his Face the Promise tour in 2006–2007, his first tour in a decade.

== Background ==
According to Seger the song was inspired by a motorcycle trip he took to Jackson Hole, Wyoming. He stated:

I wanted to do that for a long time. It was fascinating being out. The first night it was 42 degrees in northern Minnesota; the second it was 106 in South Dakota and all I had on was my shorts, and my feet were up on the handlebars to keep them from boiling on the engine. It was just silence and feeling nature.

Rolling Stone critic Dave Marsh described it as an "anthemic" song and considers it Seger's best single. Marsh interprets the song as being about "leaving a shattered home for a life that has to be better, though it never quite is." Marsh elaborates that the narrator of the song has lost his love and so goes off on a cold and lonely journey while he "lets his frustrations and confusion congeal into one sad cry that dissolves his fate into what has happened to the whole crazy mess of a world in which he lives. He sings that he plans to straighten things out for as long as he is searching but at the end he admits that only next time will they be able to get it right. Marsh feels that Roy Bittan's "elegiac" piano chords drive home the point that the time for wild rockers to settle down.

Los Angeles Times critic Richard Cromelin says that in the song Seger uses the continental divide as a metaphor for "confront[ing] questions of right and wrong," allowing him to "shake off his spiritual malaise." Cash Box called it "a most powerful, Springsteenish piano-based hymn" and said that it is fitting that Seger only finds personal freedom at the Great Divide.

Classic Rock History critic Janey Roberts rated it as Seger's all-time best song, noting some influence from Bruce Springsteen.

== Personnel ==
Credits are adapted from the liner notes of Seger's 1994 Greatest Hits compilation.

- Bob Seger – lead vocals

The Silver Bullet Band

- Chris Campbell – bass
- Craig Frost – organ

Additional musicians

- Roy Bittan – piano
- Michael Boddicker – synthesizer
- Bobbye Hall – percussion
- Russ Kunkel – drums
- Waddy Wachtel – guitar

Production

- Jimmy Iovine – producer

== Charts ==
The song peaked at number 27 on the Billboard Hot 100 chart.

Chart (1983)	Peak position
U.S. Billboard Mainstream Rock Tracks	13
U.S. Billboard Hot 100	27

== Popular culture ==
- The song is used by NASCAR on Fox in the closing credits of the 2003 Dodge/Save Mart 350 and the 2006 Pepsi 400.
- The song is featured on the Armageddon soundtrack.
- In addition, the song is played in its entirety in the final scene and closing credits of the 1985 film Mask starring Cher and Eric Stoltz.
- It was also the closing song from the 1984 film Reckless, as Aidan Quinn and Daryl Hannah drove off on Quinn's motorcycle.
