= Smokin' O.P.'s =

Studio album by Bob Seger
- Released: August 1972
- Recorded: 1972
- Studios: Pampa Studios, Warren, Michigan; RCA Studios, Toronto
- Genre: Rock and roll
- Length: 33:59
- Labels: Palladium, Reprise
- Producer: Punch Andrews

Bob Seger chronology
Brand New Morning (1971)	Smokin' O.P.'s (1972)	Back in '72 (1973)

Singles from Smokin' O.P.'s
- 1. "If I Were a Carpenter" Released: 1972; 2. "Who Do You Love?" Released: 1973

Professional ratings
Review scores
Source	Rating
AllMusic	3/5 stars
Christgau's Record Guide	C+

Smokin' O.P.'s is the fifth studio album by American rock singer-songwriter Bob Seger, released in 1972 (see 1972 in music). It marked Seger's return to rock and roll, after the sonic departure of his previous album, Brand New Morning. The album was reissued on CD by Capitol Records in 2005. It is currently the earliest Bob Seger album available on CD. The cover art is a parody of the Lucky Strike cigarette logo. Smokin' O.P.'s refers to Smokin' Other People's Songs, a derivation on the slang phrase "Smoking O.P.'s" meaning to smoke other people's cigarettes exclusively (never purchasing your own for consumption). Most of the tracks on this release are covers of songs written by other artists.

The album cover was created by Thomas Leroy Weschler, who was Seger's road manager at the time. The cover was inspired by an advertisement for Lucky Strike cigarettes. Weschler also went on to co-write Traveling Man: On the Road & Behind the Scenes with Bob Seger. The first pressings have a poem from Bob Seger, with an insert listing contributing musicians, but subsequent issues have the poem omitted and replaced by the insert information.

"If I Were a Carpenter" and "Hummin' Bird" were recorded and mixed at RCA Studios, Toronto, Canada.

== Track listing ==
Side One
No.	Title	Writer(s)	Length
1.	"Bo Diddley"	Ellas McDaniel	6:17
2.	"Love the One You're With"	Stephen Stills	4:17
3.	"If I Were a Carpenter"	Tim Hardin	3:47
4.	"Hummin' Bird"	Leon Russell	3:46

Side Two
No.	Title	Writer(s)	Length
1.	"Let It Rock"	E. Anderson	3:25
2.	"Turn on Your Love Light"	Deadric Malone, Joseph Wade Scott	4:44
3.	"Jesse James"	Traditional; arranged by Bob Seger	3:26
4.	"Someday"	Bob Seger	2:31
5.	"Heavy Music"	Bob Seger	2:28

== Personnel ==
- Bob Seger – guitar on "If I Were a Carpenter" and "Jesse James", piano on "Someday", vocals
- Jack Ashford – percussion, tambourine
- Eddie "Bongo" Brown – percussion, conga
- Mike Bruce – guitar
- Jim Bruzzese – tambourine on "If I Were a Carpenter"
- Chrystal Jenkins and Pam Todd – vocals on "Hummin' Bird" and "Jesse James"
- Skip Knapé – organ, keyboards, bass pedals; piano on "Hummin' Bird"
- David Teegarden – drums, maracas, marimba
- Al Yungton – string arrangement on "Someday"

Production

- Producer: Punch Andrews
- Engineer: Jim Bruzzese
- Assistant engineer: Greg Miller
- Mixing: Jim Cassily, Mabel Louise Smith, Thomas Weschler
- Photography: Thomas Weschler, Peter Lumetta
- Cover Design: Thomas Weschler

== Charts ==
Album – Billboard (United States)

Year	Chart	Position
1972	Pop Albums	180

Singles – Billboard (United States)

Year	Single	Chart	Position
1972	"If I Were a Carpenter"	Pop Singles	76
