= Beautiful Loser =

Studio album by Bob Seger
- Released: April 1975
- Studios: Muscle Shoals, Sheffield, Alabama
- Genre: Rock
- Length: 33:01
- Label: Capitol
- Producers: Bob Seger, Muscle Shoals Rhythm Section, Punch Andrews

Bob Seger chronology
Seven (1974)	Beautiful Loser (1975)	Live Bullet (1976)

Professional ratings
Review scores
Source	Rating
AllMusic	4.5/5 stars
Christgau's Record Guide	B−

Beautiful Loser is the eighth studio album by American rock artist Bob Seger, released in 1975. This album marked Seger's return to Capitol Records after a four-year split. His previous record with Capitol was Brand New Morning in 1971.

The album relied mostly on session musicians from the Muscle Shoals Rhythm Section, but the Silver Bullet Band members were used separately on some songs and together on "Nutbush City Limits," a cover song of the hit by Ike & Tina Turner.

== Track listing ==
All tracks are written by Bob Seger, except "Nutbush City Limits", written by Tina Turner.

Side One
No.	Title	Length
1.	"Beautiful Loser"	3:29
2.	"Black Night"	3:24
3.	"Katmandu"	6:09
4.	"Jody Girl"	3:41

Side Two
No.	Title	Length
1.	"Travelin' Man"	2:41
2.	"Momma"	3:22
3.	"Nutbush City Limits"	3:57
4.	"Sailing Nights"	3:18
5.	"Fine Memory"	2:56

Note

- The liner notes credit "Nutbush City Limits" to the Silver Bullet Band, while the album as a whole is credited to only Bob Seger.

== Personnel ==
Track numbering refers to CD and digital releases of the album.

- Bob Seger - lead vocals (all tracks), guitar (tracks 4, 5, 9), slide guitar (track 3), harmonica (track 3), piano (track 4)

Muscle Shoals Rhythm Section (all tracks except tracks 4 and 7)

- Barry Beckett - grand piano, organ, synthesizer, electric piano
- Pete Carr - lead guitar, acoustic guitar
- Roger Hawkins - drums, percussion
- David Hood - bass guitar
- Jimmy Johnson - rhythm guitar
- Spooner Oldham - organ, electric piano

Muscle Shoals Horn Section (track 3)

- Harrison Calloway - trumpet
- Ron Eades - baritone saxophone
- Charles Rose - trombone
- Harvey Thompson - tenor saxophone

Silver Bullet Band (track 7)

- Drew Abbott - guitar
- Chris Campbell - bass guitar
- Charlie Martin - drums
- Robyn Robbins - organ

Additional musicians

- Drew Abbott - guitar (tracks 2, 3)
- Kenny Bell - guitar (track 3)
- Pete Carr - guitar solo (track 6)
- Tom Cartmell - saxophone (track 7)
- Paul Kingery - guitar solo (track 7)
- Robyn Robbins - Mellotron (track 4)
- Stoney & Rocky - background vocals (track 3)

Production

- Punch Andrews - production (tracks 4 and 7 only), mixing
- Jim Bruzzesse - engineering
- Jerry Masters - engineering
- Steve Melton - engineering
- Muscle Shoals Rhythm Section - production (all tracks except 4 and 7)
- Bob Seger - production (all tracks), mixing
- Greg Smith - engineering

== Charts ==
Album - Billboard (United States)

Year	Chart	Position
1975	Pop Albums	131

Singles - Billboard (United States)

Year	Single	Chart	Position
1975	"Katmandu"	Billboard Hot 100	43
1975	"Beautiful Loser"	Billboard Hot 100	103
1976	"Nutbush City Limits"	Billboard Hot 100	69
