= Bob Seger =

American singer-songwriter (born 1945)

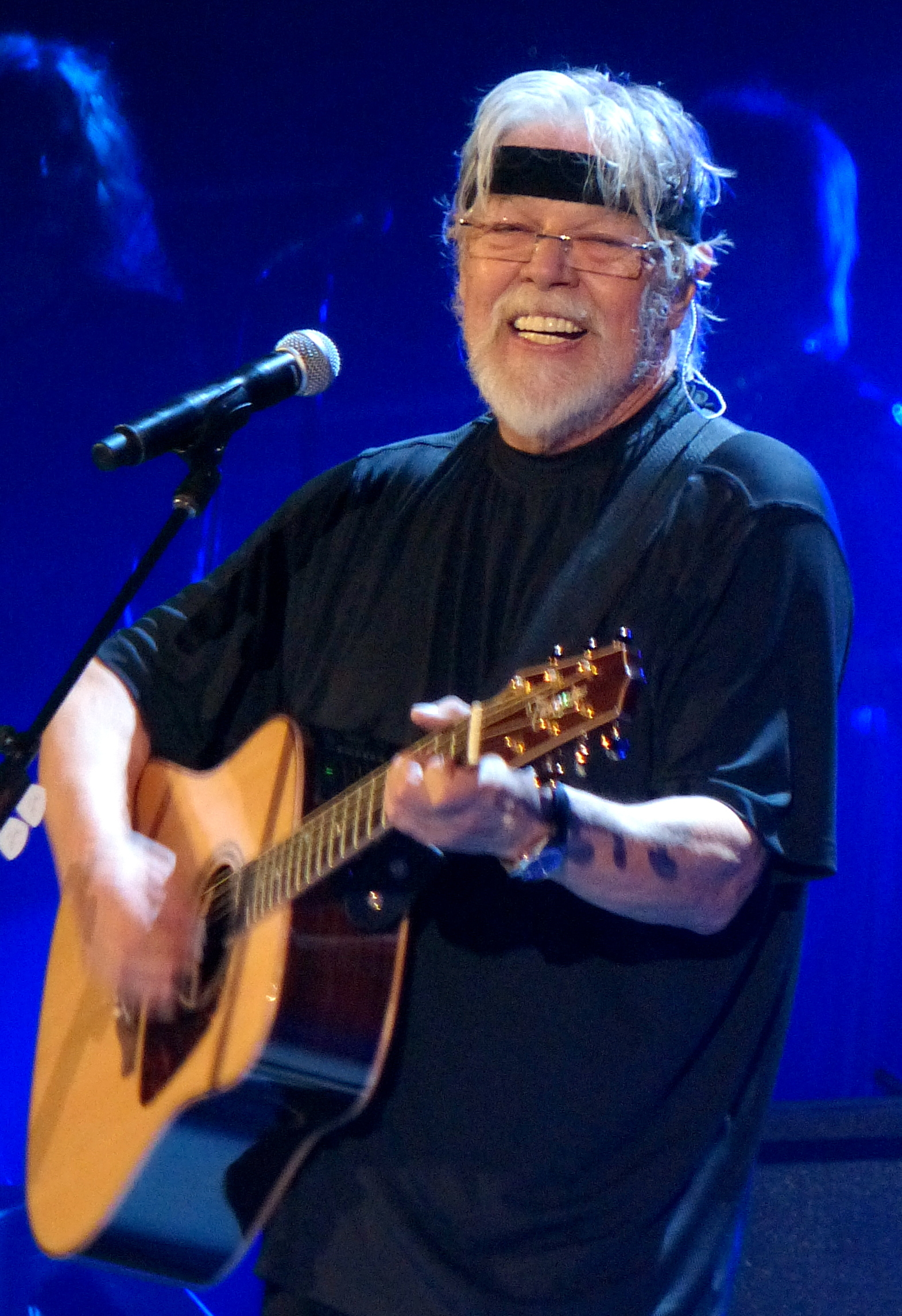
- Seger performing in Fargo, North Dakota, in 2013

Background information
- Born: Robert Clark Seger; May 6, 1945 (age 81); Detroit, Michigan, U.S.
- Genres: Rock; heartland rock; roots rock
- Occupations: Singer; songwriter; musician
- Instruments: Vocals; guitar; keyboards
- Years active: 1961–present; (One-off: 2023)
- Labels: Hideout; Cameo; Capitol; Palladium; Reprise
- Member of: The Silver Bullet Band
- Website: www.bobseger.com

Robert Clark Seger (/ˈsiːɡər/ SEE-gər; born May 6, 1945) is a retired American singer, songwriter, and musician. A roots rock musician known for his raspy, powerful voice, Seger is one of the best-known artists of the heartland rock genre, with his songs often concerning love, women, and blue-collar themes. Among his many hits are "Night Moves", "Turn the Page", "Mainstreet", "Still the Same", "Hollywood Nights", "Against the Wind", "You'll Accomp'ny Me", "Shame on the Moon", "Roll Me Away", "Like a Rock", and "Shakedown", the last of which was written for the 1987 film Beverly Hills Cop II and topped the Billboard Hot 100 chart. His recording of "Old Time Rock and Roll" was named one of the Songs of the Century in 2001, and he co-wrote the Eagles' number-one hit "Heartache Tonight".

As a locally successful Detroit-area artist, he performed and recorded with the groups Bob Seger and the Last Heard and the Bob Seger System throughout the 1960s, breaking through with his first album, Ramblin' Gamblin' Man (which contained his first national hit of the same name) in 1969. By the early 1970s, he had dropped the 'System' from his recordings and continued to strive for broader success with various other bands. In 1973, he put together The Silver Bullet Band, with a group of Detroit-area musicians, with whom he became most successful on the national level with the album Live Bullet (1976), recorded live in 1975 at Cobo Arena. In 1976, he achieved a national breakout with the studio album Night Moves. On his studio albums, he also worked extensively with the Alabama-based Muscle Shoals Rhythm Section, which appeared on several of Seger's best-selling singles and albums.

With a career spanning six decades, Seger has sold over 75 million records worldwide, making him one of the world's best-selling artists of all time. Seger was inducted into the Rock and Roll Hall of Fame in 2004 and the Songwriters Hall of Fame in 2012. Seger was named Billboard's 2015 Legend of Live honoree at the 12th annual Billboard Touring Conference & Awards, held November 18–19 at the Roosevelt Hotel in New York. His farewell tour took place in 2018 and 2019.

== Early life and education ==
Seger was born at Henry Ford Hospital in Detroit, Michigan, the son of Charlotte and Stewart Seger. At age five, he moved with his family to Ann Arbor. He had an older brother, George.

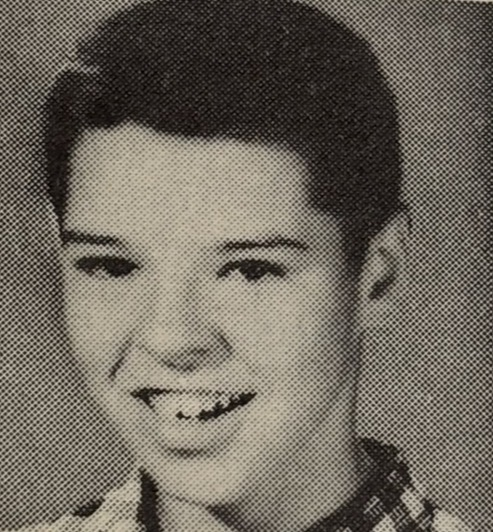
Seger's sixth grade yearbook portrait

Seger's father, a medical technician for Ford Motor Company, played several instruments and Seger was exposed to music from an early age. Seger was also exposed to frequent arguments between his parents that disturbed the neighborhood at night. In 1956, when Seger was 10 years old, his father abandoned the family and moved to California. The remaining family soon lost their comfortable middle-class status and struggled financially.

Seger attended Tappan Junior High School (now Tappan Middle School) in Ann Arbor, Michigan, and graduated in 1963 from Ann Arbor High School, now known as Pioneer High School. He ran track and field in high school. Seger also went to Lincoln Park High School for a time.

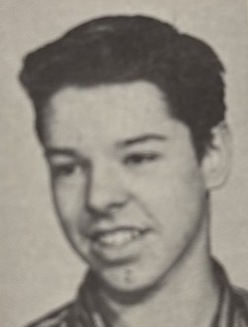
A later Seger portrait

Regarding his early musical inspirations, Seger has stated, "Little Richard – he was the first one that really got to me. Little Richard and, of course, Elvis Presley." "Come Go with Me" by The Del-Vikings, a hit in 1957, was the first record he bought.

== Career ==
=== Regional favorite and first national hit: 1961–1975 ===
==== The Decibels and The Town Criers ====
Bob Seger arrived on the Detroit music scene in 1961 fronting a three-piece band called the Decibels. The band included Seger on guitar, piano, keyboards, and vocals, Pete Stanger on guitar, and R.B. Hunter on drums. All of the members attended Ann Arbor High. The Decibels recorded an acetate demo of a song called "The Lonely One", at Del Shannon's studio in 1961. As well as being Seger's first original song, "The Lonely One" was Seger's first song to be played on the radio, airing once on an Ann Arbor radio station. In 2021, a recording of "The Lonely One" resurfaced, and was broadcast (with permission from Seger) twice on WCSX-FM in Detroit.

After the Decibels disbanded, Seger joined the Town Criers, a four-piece band with Seger on lead vocals, John Flis on bass, Pep Perrine on drums, and Larry Mason on lead guitar. The Town Criers, covering songs like "Louie Louie", grew a steady following. Meanwhile, Seger was listening to James Brown and said that, for him and his friends, Live at the Apollo was their favorite record following its release in 1963. Seger was also influenced by the music of The Beatles, once they hit American shores in 1964. In general, he and local musician friends such as Glenn Frey (later a member of the Eagles) bought into the premises of 1960s pop and rock radio, with its hook-driven hits; he later recalled himself and Frey thinking at the time, "You're nobody if you can't get on the radio."

==== Doug Brown & The Omens ====
As the Town Criers landed more gigs, Seger met Doug Brown, who fronted The Omens. Seger joined the band, as they were more established than the Town Criers. While Brown was the primary lead vocalist, Seger took the lead on some R&B numbers and made his first appearance on an officially released recording, the 1965 single "TGIF" (backed with "First Girl"), credited to Doug Brown and The Omens. Seger later appeared on Doug Brown and The Omens' parody of Barry Sadler's song "Ballad of the Green Berets", re-titled "Ballad of the Yellow Beret", which mocked draft evaders. Soon after its release, Sadler and his label threatened Brown and his band with a lawsuit, and the recording was withdrawn.

While with The Omens, Seger met his future manager Edward "Punch" Andrews, who at the time was partnered with Dave Leone running the Hideout franchise, consisting of four clubs ranging from Clawson to Rochester Hills, where local acts could play, and a small-scale record label. Seger started writing and producing other acts that Punch managed, such as the Mama Cats and the Mushrooms (with Glenn Frey). Seger and Brown were then approached by Punch and Leone to write a song for the Underdogs, a local band who recently had a hit with "Man in the Glass". Seger contributed a song called "East Side Story", which was unsuccessful.

==== The Last Heard ====
Seger decided to record "East Side Story" and officially left the Omens (though he retained Brown as a producer). As Bob Seger and the Last Heard, Seger released his version of the song on Hideout Records in 1966, and it became his first big Detroit hit. The single (backed with "East Side Sound", an instrumental version of the single's A Side) sold 50,000 copies locally and led to a contract with Cameo-Parkway Records. Though the name "The Last Heard" originally referred to the collection of Omens and Town Criers who recorded "East Side Story" with Seger, it soon became the name of Seger's band, made up of former Town Crier Pep Perrine on drums, Carl Lagassa on guitar, and Dan Honaker on bass. Following "East Side Story", the group released four more singles: the James Brown-inspired holiday single "Sock It to Me Santa", the Dylan-esque "Persecution Smith", "Vagrant Winter", and perhaps the most notable, "Heavy Music", in 1967. "Heavy Music", which outsold "East Side Story", had the potential to break out nationally when Cameo-Parkway went out of business. It was a top 100 hit in Canada, where it topped out on the national RPM charts at No. 82; in the US, it just missed the Hot 100, peaking on the "bubbling under" chart at No. 103. The song would stay in Seger's live act for many years to come.

==== The Bob Seger System ====
After Cameo-Parkway folded, Seger and Punch searched for a new label. In the spring of 1968, Bob Seger & the Last Heard signed with major label Capitol Records, turning down Motown Records, who offered more money than Capitol. Seger felt that Capitol was more appropriate for his genre than Motown.

Capitol changed the name of the band to The Bob Seger System. In the transition between labels, guitarist Carl Lagassa left, and keyboard player Bob Schultz joined. The System's first single was the anti-war message song "2 + 2 = ?", reflecting a marked change in Seger's political attitude from "The Ballad of the Yellow Beret". The single was a hit in Detroit and reached number 1 in Buffalo, New York and Orlando, Florida, but went unnoticed almost everywhere else and failed to chart nationally in the US. The single did, however, make the Canadian national charts, peaking at No. 79.

The second single was "Ramblin' Gamblin' Man". It was a major hit in Michigan, and became Seger's first nationwide hit, peaking at No. 17. Its success led to the release of an album in 1969. Ramblin' Gamblin' Man went to No. 62 on the Billboard pop albums chart. Glenn Frey got his first studio gig singing back-up and playing guitar on "Ramblin' Gamblin' Man".

Seger was unable to follow up this success. For the next album, singer-songwriter Tom Neme joined The System, ultimately writing and singing the majority of the tunes featured, for which the group was heavily criticized. Noah (1969) failed to chart, leading Seger to briefly quit the music industry to attend college. He returned the following year and put out the System's final album, 1970's Mongrel, without Neme. Bob Schultz left as well, and was replaced by Dan Watson. Mongrel, with the powerful single "Lucifer", was considered a strong album by critics and fans, but failed to sell. The Bob Seger System was inducted into the Michigan Rock and Roll Legends Hall of Fame in 2006.

==== Solo ====
After Mongrel failed to live up to the success of Ramblin' Gamblin' Man, The System disbanded. For a short time following the breakup, Seger had ambitions to be a one-man act. In 1971, he released a solo album, the all-acoustic Brand New Morning. It was a commercial failure and led to his departure from Capitol.

Having thus regained an eye for bands, Seger started playing with the duo Teegarden & Van Winkle, who in 1970 had a hit with "God, Love, and Rock & Roll". Together they recorded Smokin' O.P.'s (1972), released on Punch Andrews' own Palladium Records. The album mainly consisted of covers, spawning a minor hit with a version of Tim Hardin's "If I Were a Carpenter" (No. 76 the US), though it did feature "Someday", a new Seger original, and a re-release of "Heavy Music". The album reached 180 on the Billboard 200.

After spending most of 1972 touring with Teegarden & Van Winkle, Seger left to put together a new backing band, referred to as both My Band and the Borneo Band, made up of musicians from Tulsa. Jamie Oldaker, Dick Sims, and Marcy Levy were all members of My Band before joining Eric Clapton. In 1973, Seger put out Back in '72, recorded partly with the Muscle Shoals Rhythm Section, a renowned group of session musicians who had recorded with the likes of J. J. Cale and Aretha Franklin. According to Seger, there was a financial misunderstanding with the musicians: they offered to record him "for $1500 a side", which he took to mean $1500 per album side. When he found out that they meant $1500 per song, he left after recording three songs but resolved to work with them in the future. Back in '72 featured the studio version of Seger's later live classic "Turn the Page"; "Rosalie", a song Seger wrote about CKLW music director Rosalie Trombley (and which was later recorded by Thin Lizzy); and "I've Been Working", a song originally by Van Morrison, a strong influence on Seger's musical development. (Note: Mentioning Frankie Miller, covering Miller's song "Ain't Got No Money" on Stranger in Town album, and also Graham Parker, John Fogerty and Bruce Springsteen, Seger has remarked: "There's a whole little clique of male vocalists. We're just sort of all connected. I think every last one of us has a connection with Van Morrison.") Despite the strength of Seger's backup musicians, the album only reached 188 on the US charts and faded into obscurity. Even so, Back in '72 and its supporting tour mark the beginnings of Seger's long-time relationships with future Silver Bullet Band saxophonist Alto Reed, powerhouse female vocalist Shaun Murphy, and the Muscle Shoals Rhythm Section. Over the tour, My Band would prove to be unreliable, which frustrated Seger. By the end of 1973, Seger left My Band in search of a new backing band. Throughout 1974–75, Seger continued to perform in local venues around his hometown while known as the Bob Seger Group including one renowned concert in Davisburg, Michigan, called the "Battle of the Bands".

==== The Silver Bullet Band ====
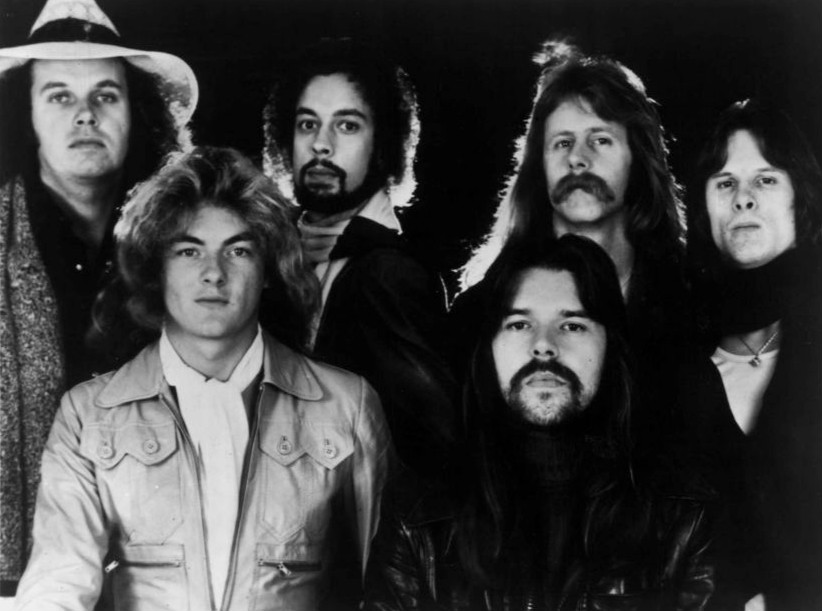
Seger (bottom right) and the Silver Bullet Band in 1977

In 1974, Seger formed the Silver Bullet Band. Its original members were guitarist Drew Abbott, drummer and backing vocalist Charlie Allen Martin, keyboardist and backing vocalist Rick Manasa, bass guitarist Chris Campbell, and saxophonist and backing vocalist Alto Reed. With this new band sitting in occasionally, Seger released Seven (1974), which contained the Detroit-area hard-rock hit "Get Out of Denver". This track was a modest success and charted at No. 80 nationally.

In 1975, Seger returned to Capitol for Beautiful Loser, with help from the Silver Bullet Band (with new keyboardist Robyn Robbins replacing Manasa) on his cover of the Tina Turner penned "Nutbush City Limits". The album's single "Katmandu", later featured in Mask, was Seger's first national break-out since "Ramblin' Gamblin' Man". Although it just missed the US Pop Top 40 – peaking at No. 43 – the song received strong airplay in several markets nationwide including Detroit.

=== Peak of success: 1976–1987 ===
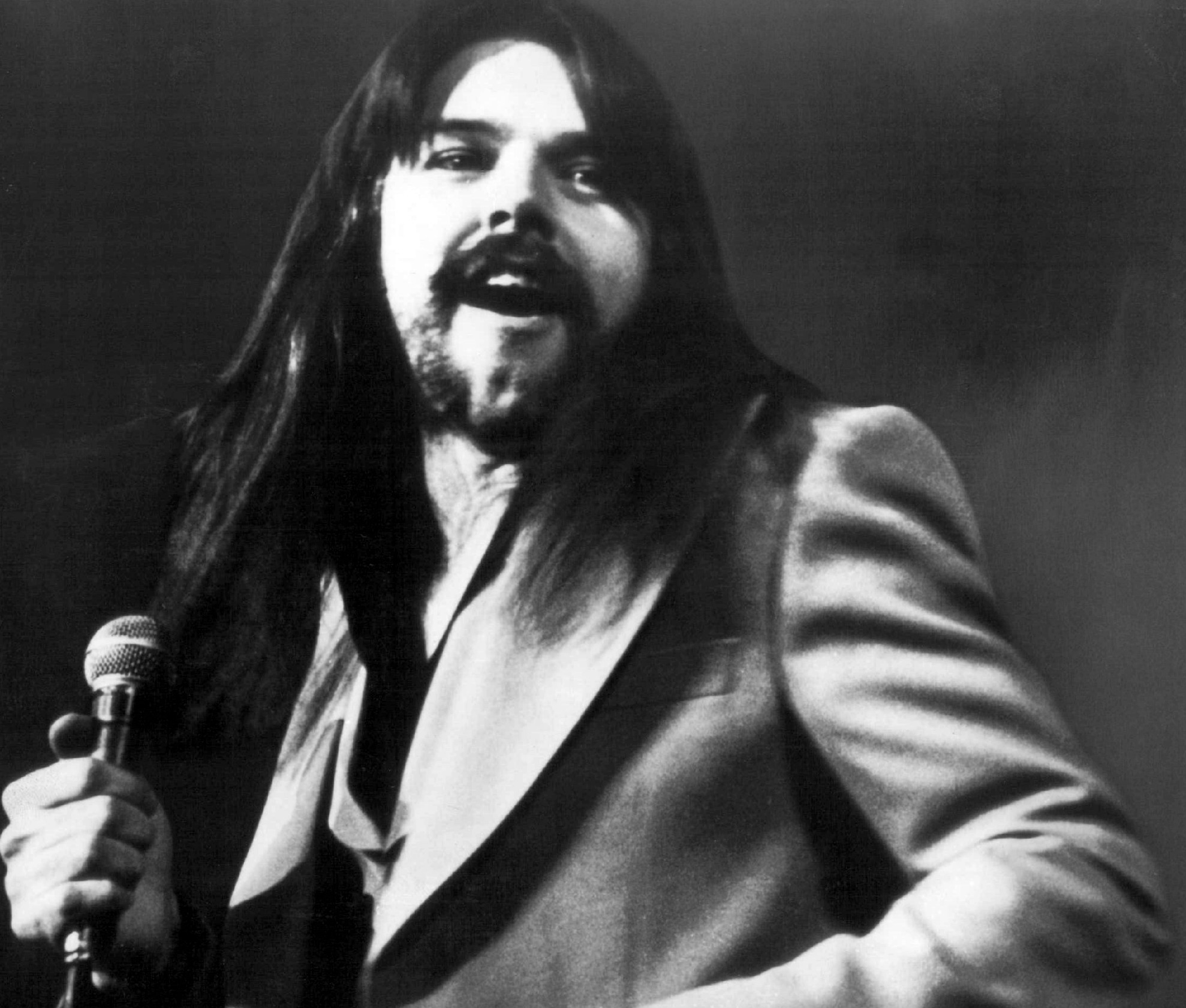
Seger in 1977

In April 1976, Seger and the Silver Bullet Band released Live Bullet, recorded over two nights at Detroit's Cobo Arena in September 1975. It contained Seger's rendition of "Nutbush City Limits" as well as his classic take on life on the road, "Turn the Page", from Back in '72. It also included his late 1960s successful releases – "Heavy Music" and "Ramblin' Gamblin' Man". Critic Dave Marsh later wrote that "Live Bullet is one of the best live albums ever made ... In spots, particularly during the medley of "Travelin' Man"/"Beautiful Loser" on side one, Seger sounds like a man with one last shot at the top." An instant best-seller in Detroit, Live Bullet got attention in other parts of the country, outselling Seger's previous albums, received progressive rock radio and album-oriented rock airplay, and enabled Seger to headline shows. But there was still a popularity imbalance; in 1976, he was a featured performer at the Pontiac Silverdome in metro Detroit in front of nearly 80,000 fans, but one night later played to fewer than a thousand people in Chicago.

Seger finally achieved his commercial breakthrough with his October 1976 album Night Moves. The title track was critically and commercially well-received, becoming a No. 4 hit on the Billboard Pop Singles chart and receiving airplay on AOR radio. The album also featured "Mainstreet" (written about Ann Arbor's Ann Street), a No. 24 hit that emphasized Seger's rock credibility as well as guitarist Pete Carr's lead guitar, and "Rock and Roll Never Forgets", which peaked at No. 41 on the Billboard Hot 100. Night Moves was Seger's first top-ten album in the Billboard album chart, and as of 2006 was certified at 6 million copies in the United States, making it the biggest-selling studio album of his career. The success of Night Moves also bolstered sales of Seger's previous releases. Seger's 1975 release Beautiful Loser eventually sold two million copies and the 1976 album Live Bullet went on to sell six million copies in the US.

In February 1977, Silver Bullet Band drummer Charlie Allen Martin was hit by a car from behind while walking on a service road and was left unable to walk. David Teegarden, previous drummer for Seger on his 1972 album Smokin' O.P.'s was his replacement.

The 1978 album Stranger in Town was a success. The first single, "Still the Same", reached No. 4 on the Billboard Hot 100. "Hollywood Nights" reached No. 12, and the ballad "We've Got Tonight" reached No. 13. "We've Got Tonight" was a major hit again when it was covered in 1983 by Kenny Rogers and Sheena Easton. Notably, it topped Billboard's Hot Country Songs and peaked at No. 2 and No. 6 on Billboard's Adult Contemporary and Hot 100 charts respectively. "Old Time Rock and Roll", a song from George Jackson and Thomas E. Jones III that Seger substantially rewrote the lyrics for, peaked at No. 28 on the Hot 100, but achieved greater popularity after being featured in the Tom Cruise film Risky Business, in which Cruise's character dances in his underwear to the song. It has since been ranked the second-most played Jukebox Single of all time, behind Patsy Cline's "Crazy". "Old Time Rock and Roll" was named one of the Songs of the Century in 2001. Seger later remarked that not taking one-third of writing credit on his recording was, financially, "the dumbest thing I ever did".

Seger also co-wrote the Eagles' No. 1 hit "Heartache Tonight" from their 1979 album The Long Run; a collaboration about Seger's and Glenn Frey's shared early lives in Detroit.

In 1980, Seger released Against the Wind (with ex-Grand Funk Railroad member Craig Frost replacing Robyn Robbins on keyboards) and it became his first and only No. 1 album on the Billboard album chart. The first single "Fire Lake" featured Eagles Don Henley, Timothy B. Schmit, and Glenn Frey on backing vocals and Muscle Shoals guitarist Pete Carr on 12-string acoustic. Fire Lake reached No. 6 on the Hot 100, while the title song "Against the Wind" reached No. 5 and crossed over to the Top 10 on Billboard's Adult Contemporary chart. "You'll Accompany Me" became the third hit single from the record, reaching No. 14. Against the Wind would also win two Grammy Awards. As of 2006, both Stranger in Town and Against the Wind had sold over 5 million copies each in the U.S.

The live 1981 album Nine Tonight encapsulated this three-album peak of Seger's commercial career. Seger's take on Eugene Williams' "Tryin' to Live My Life Without You" became a Top Five hit from Nine Tonight and the album would go on to sell 4 million copies.

Seger released the acclaimed The Distance in December 1982. During the recording of this album, Silver Bullet guitarist Drew Abbott left due to his frustration with Seger's frequent use of session musicians and was replaced by Dawayne Bailey. After the album's release, David Teegarden also left due to internal conflict and was replaced by ex-Grand Funk drummer Don Brewer. Critically praised for representing a more versatile sound than that of his recent material, The Distance spawned numerous hits beginning with Rodney Crowell's "Shame on the Moon". It was the biggest hit of the Silver Bullet Band's entire career, hitting No. 1 on the Adult Contemporary chart and holding at No. 2 for four consecutive weeks – behind Patti Austin and James Ingram's "Baby, Come to Me" and Michael Jackson's "Billie Jean" – on the Hot 100. It also crossed over to No. 15 on Billboard's Country Singles chart. The follow-up, "Even Now", just missed the Top 10, and "Roll Me Away" peaked at No. 27. The driving album track "Making Thunderbirds" was a popular music video filmed in Detroit and was well-received on MTV. Seger's multi-platinum sales dropped off at this point, however, with The Distance peaking at No. 5 and selling 1.9 million copies in the U.S. The Distance was belatedly released on 8-track tape; Capitol reportedly had no plans to do so, but Seger, claiming that many of his fans still used 8-track players in their vehicles, requested that the label also release the album in the waning format.

In 1984, Seger wrote and recorded the power rock ballad "Understanding" for the soundtrack of Teachers. The song was a Top 20 hit, and in 1986, he wrote and recorded "Living Inside My Heart" for the soundtrack of About Last Night....

Seger was no longer prolific, and several years elapsed until his next studio album, Like a Rock, emerged in 1986. The fast-paced "American Storm" was another Top-20 hit aided by a popular music video featuring Lesley Ann Warren, and the title cut followed, reaching No. 12 on Billboard's Hot 100. Later, it became familiar through its association with a long-running Chevrolet ad campaign (something Seger explicitly chose to do to support struggling American automobile workers in Detroit). Seger's 1986–1987 American Storm Tour was his self-stated last major tour, playing 105 shows over nine months and selling almost 1.5 million tickets. Like a Rock reached No. 3 and eventually sold over three million copies, although it has never been certified above platinum.

On March 13, 1987, Bob Seger & the Silver Bullet Band received a star on the Hollywood Walk of Fame for their contributions to the music industry; it is located at 1750 Vine Street.

In 1987, Seger recorded "Shakedown" for the soundtrack to Beverly Hills Cop II. A synth-driven pop-rock song, it was Seger's first and only No. 1 hit on the pop singles chart. The song had originally been intended for fellow Detroiter Glenn Frey, but when Frey lost his voice just before the recording session, he asked Seger to take his place. Seger changed the verses but kept the chorus as it was. Seger received an Oscar nomination as co-writer in the Best Original Song category the following year.

=== Later years: 1988–present ===
Seger's next record was 1991's The Fire Inside, at a time when glam metal, grunge and alternative rock were at the forefront. His new music found little viability on radio or elsewhere. The same was true of 1995's It's a Mystery, although it was certified gold (500,000 copies sold). But in 1994, Seger released Greatest Hits. The compilation was his biggest-ever record in terms of sales, selling nearly 10 million copies in the U.S. as of 2010. Seger went out for a 1996 tour, which sold the fourth-largest number of tickets of any North American tour that year.

He took a sabbatical from the music business from 1997 to 2005 to spend time with his wife and children. In 2001, and again in 2002, he won the prestigious Port Huron to Mackinac Boat Race aboard his 52-foot (16 m) sailboat Lightning. He was inducted into the Rock and Roll Hall of Fame on March 15, 2004. Fellow Detroiter Kid Rock gave the induction speech and Michigan Governor Jennifer Granholm proclaimed the date Bob Seger Day in his honor. In 2005, Bob Seger & the Silver Bullet Band were inducted into the Michigan Rock and Roll Legends Hall of Fame, and Seger was featured singing with 3 Doors Down on the song "Landing in London" from their Seventeen Days album.

Seger's first new album in eleven years, Face the Promise, was released in 2006. In its first 45 days, it sold over 400,000 copies and went on to sell 1.2 million, returning Seger to platinum status and staying on the Billboard chart for several months. The supporting tour was eagerly anticipated, with many shows selling out within minutes. Showing that his legendary appeal in Michigan was undiminished, all 10,834 tickets available for his first show at Grand Rapids' Van Andel Arena sold out in under five minutes; three additional shows were subsequently added, each of which also sold out.

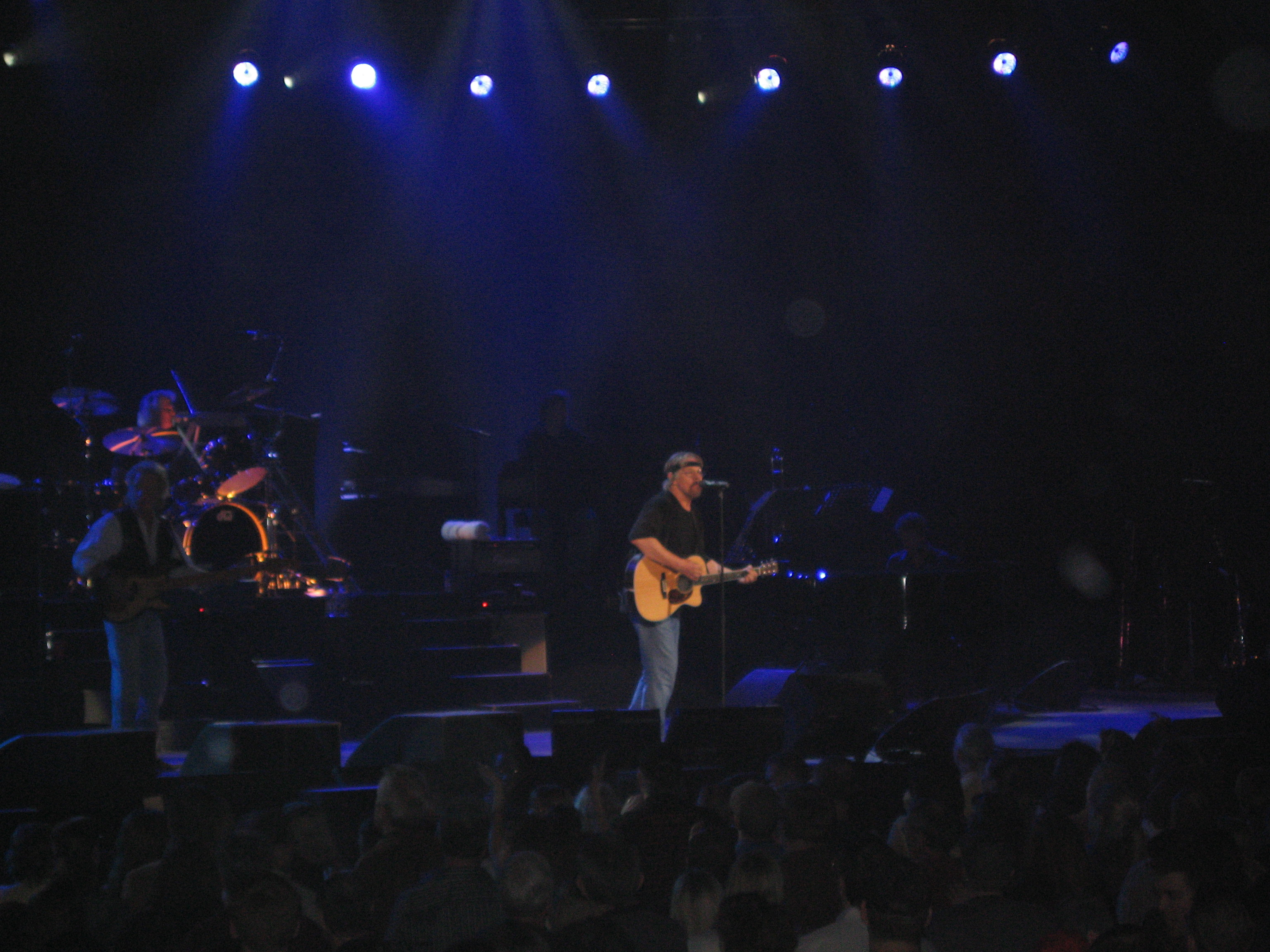
Seger and the band in 2007

In 2009, Seger released a compilation album, Early Seger Vol. 1, containing archival material from the 1970s and 1980s, including some fully or partially re-recorded tracks from Smokin' O.P.'s (1972) and Seven (1974), and some never-before-released songs. The album was initially only available for purchase at Meijer stores and then later for download at his website.

Seger contributed piano and vocals to Kid Rock's 2010 album Born Free and staged a successful arena tour during 2011, accompanied by the release of a two-CD compilation, Ultimate Hits: Rock and Roll Never Forgets. On May 28, 2011, Michigan Governor Rick Snyder proclaimed that date as Bob Seger Day (Seger's second such honor) for his more than 50 years of sharing his celebrated musical talents with fans all over the world. In 2012, Seger was inducted into the Songwriters Hall of Fame. The next year, he performed a duet of "Who'll Stop the Rain" with John Fogerty on Fogerty's album Wrote a Song for Everyone.

Seger's 17th studio album, Ride Out, was released in 2014, along with a successful arena tour of the U.S. and Canada.

On December 22, 2016, Seger performed "Heartache Tonight" as the Kennedy Center honored the Eagles. A few weeks later, on January 18, 2017, Seger gave away the single "Glenn Song" on his website as a tribute marking the first anniversary of the death of Eagles founding member Glenn Frey. That summer, Seger embarked on his Runaway Train tour, including a show at The Palace of Auburn Hills, the last event to be held at that venue. Seger released a cover of the Lou Reed song "Busload of Faith" as the first single from the I Knew You When album. Due to "an urgent medical issue with his vertebrae", all concert dates starting September 30 were postponed. Of the 32 scheduled tour dates, Seger completed thirteen and postponed nineteen.

On September 18, 2018, Seger announced his final tour. The Travelin' Man tour included postponed dates from the 2017 tour, and kicked off at the Van Andel Arena in Grand Rapids, Michigan. The tour ended on November 1, 2019, and Seger retired.

Seger made a brief return in 2023 to perform at the Country Music Hall of Fame in Nashville for the induction of Patty Loveless, playing her song "She Drew a Broken Heart". Loveless sang a duet with Seger in "The Answer's in the Question" from Seger's Face the Promise album.

Seger is to release Face the Promise: Expanded Edition on September 18, 2026 to celebrate the album's twentieth anniversary. The album is to include four bonus tracks.

== Personal life ==
Seger's first marriage to Renee Andrietti in 1968 lasted for "one day short of a year". He had a long-term relationship with Jan Dinsdale from 1972 until 1983. In 1987, he married actress Annette Sinclair and they divorced one year later. He married Juanita Dorricott in 1993, in a small private setting at The Village Club, in Bloomfield Hills; they have two children.

=== Views ===
Politically, Seger has characterized himself as a centrist: "[I'm] right down the middle", he remarked. He supported Democrat Hillary Clinton in the 2016 presidential election.

He tackled antiestablishment themes in early songs such as "2 + 2 = ?" (1968) and "U.M.C. (Upper Middle Class)" (1974), according to Brian McCollum of the Detroit Free Press. On his 2014 album Ride Out, he addressed topics such as gun violence and wrote "It's Your World" about climate change. On the subject, he said, "There are a lot of culprits in climate change, and everybody's responsible, myself included. Nobody gets a free pass on this one. We've got to change our ways and change them fast."

He has considered President Barack Obama to be the favorite president of his lifetime. Seger met Obama at the 2016 Kennedy Center Honors and thanked the president for his "wisdom and dignity."

== Legacy ==
With a career spanning six decades, Seger has sold over 75 million records worldwide, making him one of the world's best-selling artists of all time. On March 13, 1987, Bob Seger & the Silver Bullet Band received a star on the Hollywood Walk of Fame for their contributions to the music industry; it is located at 1750 Vine Street. Seger was inducted into the Rock and Roll Hall of Fame in 2004 and the Songwriters Hall of Fame in 2012. He was named Billboard's 2015 Legend of Live honoree at the 12th annual Billboard Touring Conference & Awards in New York. Lincoln Park declared November 17, 2017, "Bob Seger Day" in the city. Mayor Thomas Karnes called Seger the voice of the city for their generation. Seger attended school there in his youth and performed at the city's bandshell in the 1960s. In 2023, Rolling Stone ranked Seger at number 181 on its list of the 200 Greatest Singers of All Time.

== Discography ==
=== Studio albums ===
- Ramblin' Gamblin' Man (1969)
- Noah (1969)
- Mongrel (1970)
- Brand New Morning (1971)
- Smokin' O.P.'s (1972)
- Back in '72 (1973)
- Seven (1974)
- Beautiful Loser (1975)
- Night Moves (1976)
- Stranger in Town (1978)
- Against the Wind (1980)
- The Distance (1982)
- Like a Rock (1986)
- The Fire Inside (1991)
- It's a Mystery (1995)
- Face the Promise (2006)
- Ride Out (2014)
- I Knew You When (2017)

=== Live albums ===
- Live Bullet (1976)
- Nine Tonight (1981)

=== Compilation albums ===
- Greatest Hits (1994)
- Greatest Hits 2 (2003)
- Early Seger Vol. 1 (2009)
- Ultimate Hits: Rock and Roll Never Forgets (2011)
- Heavy Music: The Complete Cameo Recordings 1966–1967 (2017)

== See also ==
- List of American Grammy Award winners and nominees
- List of artists who reached number one on the US Mainstream Rock chart
