= List of songs about Detroit =

This list of songs about Detroit contains any songs about or involving the U.S. city of Detroit.

== 0-9 ==
- "40 Hour Week (For a Livin’)" - Alabama
- "8 Mile" - Eminem
- "8 Mile Boogie" - Pat Flowers
- "8 Miles" - Obie Trice
- "8 Miles And Runnin' " – Jay-Z and Freeway
- "25th Floor" - Patti Smith
- "313" - Alley Life
- "313" - Eminem and Eye-Kyu

== A ==
- "Adrenaline Rush" - Obie Trice
- "A Long Time" - Mayer Hawthorne
- "Alive in 5D" - Gardens
- "All American Man" - Kiss
- "All My Life" - Blade Icewood
- "All Over the World" - ELO
- "American Bad Ass" - Kid Rock
- "Amityville" - Eminem, and Bizarre from The Marshall Mathers LP (2000)
- "Anaconda" - Nicki Minaj
- "Ancestors" - Oblisk
- "April in the D" - The Victorious Secrets
- "RGF Island" - Fetty Wap

== B ==
- "Baby Come Home" - Kid Rock
- "Back to Detroit" - Nikki Corvette & the Stingrays
- "Back to Detroit" - Wayne Kramer
- "Back to Detroit (Motor City Remix)" - Beatdrum
- "Backyard War" - Achromatik
- "Beautiful" - Eminem 2009 (rap rock)
- "Belle Isle Players" - Starski & Clutch
- "Be My Lover" - Alice Cooper (often mistaken as "Detroit City")
- "The Big Three Killed My Baby" - The White Stripes from The White Stripes (album) 1999
- "Bitch Please II" - Eminem, Dr. Dre, Snoop Dogg, Xzibit, & Nate Dogg
- "Black Day in July" - Gordon Lightfoot (from Canada)
- "Bless You Boys" - Curtis Gladson and Loren Woods
- "Blessed St. Anthony" - Ty Stone
- "Blowing Up Detroit" - John Palumbo
- "Born in Detroit," The Rockets
- "Broke in Detroit (Again)" - The Dirtbombs
- "Broken Man" - The Von Bondies
- "Buried in Detroit" - Mike Posner
- "BMF" - SZA

== C ==
- "Cadillac Assembly Line" - Albert King
- "Can't Tame The Lion" - Journey
- "Christmas Eve on Woodward Avenue" - Karen Newman
- "C-I-T-Y" - John Cafferty & The Beaver Brown Band
- "City of Boom" - Detroit Most Wanted
- "Country Grammar" – Nelly
- "Crank Dat Icewood" - Johnny King

== D ==
- "Da East" - Niko
- "The D in Detroit" - The Anniversary
- "Dancing in the Street" - Martha and the Vandellas (1964) (#2 Billboard Hot 100)
- "Detroit (Born + Raised)" - André DeJuan, from his upcoming third studio album, I'm Not Me
- "Detroit" - (from the Disney film, The Happiest Millionaire, introduced by John Davidson)
- "Detroit" - David Reo
- "Detroit" - Eddie "Guitar" Burns
- "Detroit" - Esham (featuring TNT)
- "Detroit" - Fireworks
- "Detroit" - Laurent Garnier
- "Detroit" - Gorillaz
- "Detroit" - Green Concorde
- "Detroit" - Ian Hunter
- "Detroit"- Injecting Strangers
- "Detroit (That's My Home Town)" - Kim Weston
- "Detroit" - Mogue Doyle
- "Detroit" - Morgan Geist
- "Detroit" - Nigeri Earth
- "Detroit" - Pato Margetic
- "Detroit" - Primal Scream
- "Detroit" - Rancid
- "Detroit" - Red Hot Chili Peppers
- "Detroit" - Royce Da 5'9"(featuring Travis Barker)
- "Detroit" - Tyler Childers
- "Detroit" - Va-Voom
- "Detroit" - Spring King
- "Detroit 4 Life" - A.W.O.L.
- "Detroit 101" - City Squad
- "Detroit 101" - Esham
- "Detroit 442" - Blondie
- "Detroit '67" - Sam Roberts Band
- "Detroit Blues" - Diana Krall; Vince Benedetti
- "Detroit Blues" - Tampa Red
- "Detroit Breakdown" - The Bellrays
- "Detroit Breakdown" - The J. Geils Band
- "Detroit Breakdown" - The Gories
- "Detroit City" - Alice Cooper
- "Detroit City" - LetricKramer
- "Detroit City (I Wanna Go Home)" - Bobby Bare (composed by Danny Dill)
- "Detroit City" - Sonny B
- "Detroit City" - Texas
- "Detroit City Blues" - Fats Domino
- "Detroit, Detroit" - Bugz
- "Detroit, Detroit" - Erik Koskinen
- "Detroit Diesel" - Alvin Lee
- "Detroit Drive" - Eliza Neals
- "Detroit Girl" - Raphael Saadiq
- "Detroit Girls" - Starz
- "Detroit Has a Skyline" - HiFi Handgrenades
- "Detroit Has a Skyline" - Superchunk
- "Detroit Iron" - The Darts
- "Detroit Jump" - Big Maceo Merriweather
- "Detroit Lady" - Motor City Josh
- "Detroit Michigan" - Ronnie Love
- "Detroit, Michigan"- Kid Rock from Rebel Soul 2012
- "Detroit, Michigan" - The Peps
- "Detroit Moan"- Victoria Spivey
- "Detroit Murderous" - Big Hoodoo (from the album 'Crystal Skull')
- "Detroit Niggaz" - Street Lord'z
- "The Detroit River Dirty Blues" - Michael Katon
- "Detroit Rock City" - Kiss 1976
- "Detroit Rock City Homage" - Forced Anger
- "Detroit Special" - Big Bill Broonzy
- "Detroit Sound" - Soul Designer
- "Detroit Stand Up" - Ray O'Shea (featuring Big Herk, BO$$, Phohessuain, Esham, Malik (Eddie Kain), Al Nuke & Proof)
- "Detroit State of Mind" - Elzhi
- "Detroit Style" - A1 People
- "Detroit Summer" - Obie Trice
- "Detroit Sunrise" - Dwele neo-soul, 2010
- "Detroit Swing 66" - Gomez
- "Detroit Swing City" - Alien Fashion Show
- "Detroit Thang" - Kid Rock
- "Detroit Tickets" - Apoptygma Berzerk
- "Detroit Tin" - The Kursaal Flyers
- "Detroit Vs. Everybody" - Eminem, Royce da 5’9”, Big Sean, Danny Brown, Dej Loaf, & Trick Trick from Shady XV 2014
- "Detroit was Built on Secrets" - Search the City
- "Detroit Waves" - Matt Nathanson
- "Detroit Women" - Stacia Petrie
- "Detroit Winter" - Platinum Pied Pipers (featuring MC Invincible)
- "Detroit Zoo" - Disco D
- "Detroiter, Part 2" - Bantam Rooster
- "Devil's Night" - D12 2001, (horrorcore)
- "Devil's Night" - Sonny B
- "Devil Without A Cause" - Kid Rock
- "Diet Coke" - Pusha T
- "Don't Stop Believin'" - Journey ("born and raised in south Detroit")
- "Don't Shut Em Down" - Flogging Molly
- "Dog Eat Dog" - Ted Nugent
- "Dope Job Homeless" - Obie Trice
- "Detroit Slums" - Back In Spades
- "Detroit Rock & Roll" - Frijid Pink
- "Doctor Detroit" - Devo

== E ==
- "Eastern Market" - Yusef Lateef
- "Elizabeth Parker" - Dave Caruso

== F ==
- "Feel Older Now" - Flo & Eddie
- "Fire Editorial" - The Mountain Goats
- "For The D" - Guilty Simpson
- "Foul Mouff" - Paradime (featuring Kid Rock)
- "From The D" - Eminem, Trick Trick, and Kid Rock
- "From The D to the A" - Tee Grizzley (featuring Lil Yachty)
- "From The D 2 the LBC" - Eminem (featuring Snoop Dogg)
- "Friday Night Cypher" - Big Sean
- "Fuck Battlin’" - D12
- "Fuck Off" - Kid Rock (featuring Eminem)

== G ==
- "Geography" - Lali Puna
- "Ghetto Music" - Bizarre, King Gordy, Swifty McVay, & Stic.man
- "Ghetto Zone" - Inner City Posse
- "Gangster Funk" - Prince Vince and the Hip Hop Force
- "God Bless the USA" – Lee Greenwood
- "Going Back to Motown" - John Palumbo
- "Got No Place to Go" - Migrant Kids
- "Guap" - Big Sean From Hall of Fame 2012
- "Gone Long Gone" - Frijid Pink
- "Great Time in Detroit" - Harmonie Park
- "Gimme Gimme Good Lovin" - Adrenalin

== H ==
- "Halloween On Military Street" - Insane Clown Posse
- "Hand Springs" - The White Stripes
- "Hands Up For Detroit" - Matthew Dear (co-produced by Ghettotech pioneer Disco D)
- "Happy Dagger" - Millions Of Brazilians
- "Hard Scratch Pride" - Whitey Morgan and the 78's
- "Heaven" - Uncle Kracker (featuring Kid Rock and Paradime)
- "Hello, Detroit" - Daniel Boaventura
- "Hello, Detroit" - Sammy Davis Jr.
- "Hello, Detroit" - Sonny Turner
- "Here At Home (In Detroit City)" - Stony Creek
- "Hillbilly Highway" - Steve Earle
- "Hockeytown" - Joe Lynn Turner
- "Hokus Pocus"- Insane Clown Posse
- "Horkenbach Blues (Why is Everyone Discriminatin' 'gainst Me?)" - The Dennis Horkenbach Trio
- "Horribly Horrifying" - Violent J
- "Hey Now (Motor City)" - The Vandalias
- "The Horizontal Bop" - Bob Seger from Against the Wind 1980
- "Hotel Yorba" - The White Stripes 2001
- "Home Town" - Big Sean
- "Hometown" - Mitch Ryder from Naked But Not Dead
- "Hypnotize (The Notorious B.I.G. song)" - The Notorious B.I.G.

== I ==
- "I Am" - Kid Rock
- "I Am Detroit" - Electric Six
- "I Care About Detroit" - Smokey Robinson & The Miracles
- "I Love Detroit" - Amboy Rambler
- "I Wanna Go Back" - Kid Rock
- "In Detroit" - Delta Twins ( https://deltatwins.bandcamp.com/track/in-detroit-2 )
- "In Detroit" ( Featuring TNT ) - Esham
- "In The City" - Marquise Porter
- "In Thee" - Blue Öyster Cult
- "Inmates" - The Good Life
- "Inner City Blues" - Rodriquez, aka Sixto Diaz Rodriguez
- "Inner City Blues (Make Me Wanna Holler)" - Marvin Gaye from What's Going On 1971
- "Intro" - Kid Rock
- "It's Been A Long Time" - Mayer Hawthorne
- "It's Still East Detroit to Me" - Kid Rock
- "It's So Cold in the D" - T-Baby

== K ==
- "Kill Ya Self" - Trick Trick ( DJ Drama: Welcome To Detroit Gangsta Grillz Edition )
- "Krack Rocks" ( Featuring Uncle Kracker ) - Kid Rock 1996

== L ==
- "LafaLetItRock. Bob Segerette Blues" - The White Stripes ( Features names of Detroit streets )
- "Landing In Detroit" - The Detroit Grand Pubahs
- "The Last Time I Saw Richard" - Joni Mitchell
- "Lay it on Me" - Kid Rock
- "Leaving Detroit" - Roses Are Red
- "Leaving Detroit" - Eliza Neals
- "Let It Fly" - Trick Trick ft. Ice Cube
- "Let's Roll" - Trick Trick ft. Denaun Porter
- "Lighters Up" - Lil' Kim
- "Lightning Over Detroit" - Richard Madow
- "Life In The D" - Brendan Benson
- "Line #7" - Dierks Bentley
- "Lipstick" - Kip Moore
- "Live" ( Featuring Esham ) - Kid Rock
- "The Load-Out" - Jackson Browne
- "Lock It Up" - Eminem feat. Anderson.Paak
- "Lose Yourself" - Eminem from 8 Mile, 2002, video shows the Ambassador Bridge
- "Love For My City" - Blade Icewood ft. Juan & Jesse James
- "Lovin On Me" - Jack Harlow

== M ==
- "Made in Hockeytown" - Red Wings - Paul Shonk http://www.paulshonk.com/
- "Man From Detroit" - Hard Place
- "Moths And Lizards In Detroit" - Andy Roberts
- "Michigan & Trumbull" - The Original Brothers and Sisters of Love
- "Motor City" - The Satintones
- "Motor City" - Randy Weeks
- "Motor City Baby" - The Dirtbombs
- "Motor City Boogie" - York Brothers
- "Motor City Girl" - The Badways
- "Motor City Is Burning" - MC5; John Lee Hooker
- "Motor City Madhouse" - Ted Nugent 1975
- "Motor City Serenade" - Stewart Francke
- "Motortown" - Kane Gang
- "M.O.T.O.W.N. ( Murderous Outcold Town Of Wild Niggaz )" - Big Herk
- "Motown Country" - CURTICE/MARKLEY & Motown Station
- "Motown Music" - Rod Stewart 1991 (#10 on Billboard Hot 100)
- "Motown Junk" - Manic Street Preachers (Welsh band)
- "Motown Never Sounded So Good" - Less Than Jake
- "Movin’ Along (A Song For Detroit)" - Alma Smith
- "Move To Detroit" - Eddie "Flashin" Fowlkes
- "Murder City Nights" - Radio Birdman

== N ==
- "Need Somebody" - Subdudes
- "New Detroit" - Neon Blonde
- "Nobody in Detroit" - Howling Diablos
- "New Nathans Detroit" - Braid (band)
- "Northern Soul"- Above and Beyond (band)

== O ==
- "Ode To Detroit" - Wally Pleasant
- "Oh Detroit, Lift Up Your Weary Head!" - Sufjan Stevens
- "The Old Stuff" - Garth Brooks
- "One Piece At A Time" - Johnny Cash
- "One Woman Army" - Porcelain Black
- "One Way Out" - thenewno2
- "Out" - Insane Clown Posse

== P ==
- "Paid" - Kid Rock
- "Panic In Detroit" - David Bowie
- "Papa Hobo" - Paul Simon
- "Party on 4th Street" - Black Nasty (available on the "Funky Funky Detroit" compilation)
- "Passport to Detroit" - Joe Strummer
- "Peacemaker" - Green Day (The song is part of a rock opera album which takes place in Detroit. The lyric "I am a killjoy, from Detroit"). 21st Century Breakdown
- "Places To Go" - 50 Cent
- "Planet of Visions" - Kraftwerk
- "Please II" - Eminem
- "Posse On Verner" - Insane Clown Posse
- "the Power's Out" - Flogging Molly
- "Pride of the Wolverines" - John Philip Sousa
- "Put Your Hands Up 4 Detroit" - Fedde Le Grand (#1 UK Singles Chart)

== Q ==
- "Queen of Detroit" - +/- (band)

== R ==
- "Rainin in Detroit" - Eliza Neals
- "Renaissance State of Mind" - Ro Spit & Monica Blaire
- "Represent" - Stretch Money
- "Reputation" - Apollo Brown & Guilty Simpson
- "Richard" - Obie Trice ft. Eminem
- "Ride" - Royce Da 5'9" ft. Big Herk & Juan
- "Rise Again" - Hush
- "Rock City" - Royce da 5'9" featuring Eminem
- "Rock & Roll (The Velvet Underground song)" - Detroit (band)
- "Rock N Roll Jesus" - Kid Rock
- "Roll On (Kid Rock song)" - Kid Rock 2008
- "Rollin' On The Island" ( Featuring Wes Chill And Prince Vince ) - Kid Rock
- "Rose Darling" - Steely Dan

== S ==
- "So Detroit"- Mark Kassa and Slight Return feat. The A.I. Fam wsg Tony "T Money" Green
- "Say Nice Things About Detroit" - They Might Be Giants
- "Son Of Detroit" - Kid Rock
- "South Telegraph Rd" - Amboy Rambler
- "Second Home" - Big A
- "Seized Up" - The Suicide Machines
- "Shake That" - Eminem feat. Nate Dogg
- "Shake Your Detroit Right" - Mark Kassa and Slight Return feat. George Clinton
- "Shuttin' Detroit Down" - John Rich
- "Sister" - Sufjan Stevens
- "Six Mile Stretch"- Sam Donahue and Ken Meisel
- "Sleepin Tonight In Detroit"- The Disregarded
- "So Far..." - Eminem
- "Son Of Detroit" - Kid Rock
- "Southwest Song" - Insane Clown Posse
- "Spaghetti a Detroit" - Fred Bongusto
- "Straight From The D" - Mr Knox
- "Stay True To Ya City" - Natas
- "She Was Hot" - The Rolling Stones

== T ==
- "The D" - Mark Kassa and Slight Return
- "Take His Life" - Royce da 5'9" & Tre Little
- "Take Money To Make Money" - Stretch Money
- "Taking It To Detroit" - The Good Rats
- "Telegraph Road" - Dire Straits (from UK)
- "That's Detroit To Me" - King Gordy
- "The Arms Forest" - The Hard Lessons
- "The Fire Inside" - Bob Seger
- "The Girl from Detroit City" - Suzi Quatro
- "The Heart of Rock & Roll" - Huey Lewis & the News
- "The Smog" - Insane Clown Posse
- "These Hands (song for Detroit)" - Jason Roseboom
- "There They Go" - Obie Trice (Featuring Eminem, Big Herk And Trick-Trick)
- "This One Or That One" - Tyvek
- "Tooling For Anus" - The Meatmen (Chorus mentions Detroit and suburban clubs such as, 'Bookies', 'Nunzio's' and 'Menjo's')
- "Tommy Pays the Rent" - Manolete (Mentions growing up in Michigan and Detroit)
- "Turn It Up" - Texas Hippie Coalition ("Darling Nikki was from Detroit")

== U ==
- "U Can Get Fucked Up" - Trick Trick (featuring Goon Sqwad)
- "Up on Twelfth Street" - Sir Mack Rice

== W ==
- "Welcome To The D" - Mark Kassa and Slight Return
- "W.T.P. (White Trash Party)" - Eminem
- "We Almost Lost Detroit" - Dale Earnhardt Jr. Jr.
- "We Almost Lost Detroit" - Gil Scott-Heron
- "We Almost Lost Detroit" - Natas
- "We Almost Lost Detroit" - Marquise Porter
- "Welcome 2 Detroit" - Trick Trick (featuring Eminem)
- "Welcome 2 The Party" - Kid Rock
- "Welcome Back To Detroit - Mariner
- "Welcome To Detroit" - Jay-Dee
- "Welcome To Detroit" - Eminem
- "Welcome To Detroit City" - Obie Trice
- "What I Learned Out On The Road" - Kid Rock
- "Where My Nigz At ?" - Esham
- "Where the Money Is Made" - Detroit Most Wanted
- "Wreck Of The Edmund Fitzgerald, The" - Gordon Lightfoot
- "Worse Than Detroit" - Robert Plant
- "Who's Afraid of Detroit" - Claude VonStroke

== Y ==
- "Yellow Brick Road" - Eminem
- "You Can Make It" - Achromatik feat. Royce da 5'9"
- "You Never Met A Mother Fucker Quite Like Me" - Kid Rock 2002
- "You Don't Want None of This" - A.W.O.L
