= Sunshine & Whiskey (song) =

Single by Frankie Ballard

from the album Sunshine & Whiskey
- Released: April 14, 2014
- Recorded: 2014
- Genre: Country
- Length: 3:02
- Label: Warner Bros. Nashville
- Songwriter(s): Jaren Johnston; Luke Laird
- Producer(s): Marshall Altman

Frankie Ballard singles chronology
"Helluva Life" (2013)	"Sunshine & Whiskey" (2014)	"Young & Crazy" (2015)

"Sunshine & Whiskey" is a song recorded by American country music artist Frankie Ballard. It was released in April 2014 as the second single from Ballard's second studio album, of the same name. The song was written by Jaren Johnston and Luke Laird.

"Sunshine & Whiskey" peaked at number one on the Billboard Country Airplay chart, giving Ballard his second number-one hit on that chart. It also charted at numbers 5 and 57 on both the Hot Country Songs and Hot 100 charts respectively. The song was certified Platinum by the Recording Industry Association of America (RIAA), and has sold 590,000 copies in the United States as of December 2014. It received similar chart success in Canada, peaking at number 4 on the Canada Country chart and number 75 on the Canadian Hot 100 chart. It received a Gold certification from Music Canada, denoting sales of 40,000 units in that country.

The accompanying music video for the song was directed by Jack Guy.

== Critical reception ==
The song received a favorable review from Taste of Country, calling the song "catchy and easy to appreciate from the very first listen" and predicting that "‘Sunshine & Whiskey’ should help [Ballard] establish himself as a newcomer to watch in 2014."

== Music video ==
The music video was directed by Jack Guy and premiered in September 2014.

== Chart performance ==
"Sunshine & Whiskey" debuted at number 59 on the U.S. Billboard Country Airplay chart for the week of April 19, 2014. It also debuted at number 44 on the U.S. Billboard Hot Country Songs chart for the week of May 17, 2014. It entered the Billboard Hot 100 at No. 100 on the chart dated July 26, 2014, and peaked at No. 57 on the chart dated November 8, 2014. The song has sold 590,000 copies in the U.S as of December 2014.

Chart (2014)	Peak position
Canada (Canadian Hot 100)	75
Canada Country (Billboard)	4
US Billboard Hot 100	57
US Country Airplay (Billboard)	1
US Hot Country Songs (Billboard)	5

=== Year-end charts ===
Chart (2014)	Position
US Country Airplay (Billboard)	8
US Hot Country Songs (Billboard)	24

== Certifications ==
Region	Certification	Certified units/sales
Canada (Music Canada)	Gold	40,000^{*}
United States (RIAA)	Platinum	1,000,000^{‡}
^{*} Sales figures based on certification alone.^{‡} Sales+streaming figures based on certification alone.
