= After the Morning After =

EP by Todd Carey
- Released: June 14, 2010 (US)
- Recorded: Revolver Studios (Westlake, California)
- Genre: Alternative rock, singer-songwriter
- Length: 18:01
- Label: Inspiration Factory Records
- Producer: Mikal Blue

Todd Carey EP chronology
| Whitefish Bay Sessions EP (2007) | After the Morning After (2010) |

After the Morning After is the second solo EP of singer-songwriter Todd Carey. It was released in the US on June 14, 2010.

== History ==
After the Morning After was the first major release from Todd Carey after releasing Watching Waiting in 2007. After spending two years touring and supporting the Watching Waiting album, Carey moved from Chicago to Brooklyn, New York to begin work on material for another album. Carey assembled songs and demos that he recorded in his Park Slope apartment with the intent on self-producing his next release. At some point Carey flew to Los Angeles with a CD of songs and played them for producer Mikal Blue, whom he knew through Brendan James, who had worked with Blue to produce his last album, The Day is Brave.

After meeting and listening to Carey's music, Blue asked Carey to begin recording together and working on material, which they did. They ended up producing a full album's worth of material, but the release was cut down to an EP. Carey self-published and distributed the EP to iTunes and other retailers with little marketing, but the EP debuted in the top 40 on iTunes charts.

== Track listing ==
All songs written by Todd Carey, except for "The Kind of Man I Am" which was written by Todd Carey/Mikal Blue.

| No. | Title | Length |
|---|---|---|
| 1. | "The First Day" | 3:42 |
| 2. | "After the Morning After" | 3:43 |
| 3. | "The Kind of Man I Am" | 3:47 |
| 4. | "Where are You Tonight?" | 3:40 |
| 5. | "Gotta Be Next to You" | 3:09 |

== Personnel ==
=== Musicians ===
- Todd Carey: vocals, acoustic and electric guitar, piano, whirly
- Mikal Blue: bass, acoustic guitar, strings, whirly
- Victor Indrizzo: drums
- Steve Black: cello
- Amber Rubarth: vocals ("Gotta Be Next to You")

=== Production ===
- Mikal Blue: engineering, recording, production, mixing
- Jeff Sojka: assistant recording engineering
- Andrew Dixon: assistant recording engineering
- Brian Gelber: executive producer
- Laura Crosta: photography
- Peter Michels: cover design
