= The Horizontal Bop =

Single by Bob Seger & The Silver Bullet Band

from the album Against the Wind
- B-side: "Her Strut"
- Released: 1980
- Recorded: Criteria (Miami)
- Genre: Rock; hard rock
- Length: 4:03 (Album version); 3:20 (7" version)
- Label: Capitol
- Songwriter: Bob Seger
- Producers: Punch Andrews, Bob Seger

Bob Seger & The Silver Bullet Band singles chronology
"You'll Accomp'ny Me" (1980)	"The Horizontal Bop" (1980)	"Tryin' to Live My Life Without You" (1981)

"The Horizontal Bop" is a song written by Bob Seger that was first released on his 1980 album Against the Wind. It was also released as the fourth single from the album, backed by "Her Strut". The single did not perform as well as the earlier singles from the album, stalling at No. 42 on the Billboard Hot 100.

== Music and lyrics ==
Unlike the earlier, more successful singles from Against the Wind, "Against the Wind," "You'll Accomp'ny Me" and "Fire Lake," "The Horizontal Bop" is not a ballad but a fast rock and roll song. Roy Trakin of The Daily News felt it lacked the drive of the more popular, slower songs from Against the Wind. Music critic Herb Ditzel describes it as being a "tongue-in-cheek devil-may-care basic [rocker] that has its roots in hundreds of songs." Ed Padgett describes it as a "Chuck Berry style song."

The subject is having sex. Music journalist Jimmy Guterman and arts editor Owen O'Donnell describe the song as being a "huffy song about sex" as well as a "safe song about sex" that was issued long before the age of safe sex. Music critic Ron Kroese views it as displaying Seger's sense of humor and describes the lyrics as presenting "a night of wild partying and dancing as merely sustained foreplay before the real bop can begin." Seger felt that "The Horizontal Bop" added something new to his live shows that other songs didn't provide.

== Reception ==
Musician Alix Dobkin criticized the lyrics of "The Horizontal Bop" for promoting activities which could lead to harmful ramifications for women, such as unwanted pregnancy. Rolling Stone critic Dave Marsh felt it was "hollow." Guterman and O'Donnell rated it as one of the 50 worst rock and roll singles of all time. They particularly criticize the fact that in their opinion it could be sung by high school boys to bond with other boys over their fear of girls, while high school girls could sing it as a "goofy song" about having sex without any dirty words. Roysdon considered it one of the most fun songs on Against the Wind. In 2004 Brian McCollum called it one of "a handful of frisky numbers" from Against the Wind "that remain audience faves." On the other hand, Billboard described it as being "graced by sterling guitar work, a hot sax solo and Seger's gruff rock vocal." Record World called it a "suggestive rocker [with] enough guitar flash and piano punch for multi-format radio."

Although the previous three singles from Against the Wind reached the Top 20 of the Billboard Hot 100, "The Horizontal Bop" only reached #42.

"The Horizontal Bop" has been performed live on several Bob Seger tours with the Silver Bullet Band. Silver Bullet Band saxophonist Alto Reed received praise for his performances on this song during Seger's 1980 tour.
