= It All Started with a Beer =

Single by Frankie Ballard

from the album El Rio
- Released: November 16, 2015
- Genre: Country
- Length: 4:19 (album version); 3:57 (single version)
- Label: Warner Bros. Nashville
- Songwriters: Jaren Johnston; Neil Mason; Jeremy Stover
- Producer: Marshall Altman

Frankie Ballard singles chronology
"Young & Crazy" (2015)	"It All Started with a Beer" (2015)	"Cigarette" (2016)

"It All Started with a Beer" is a song recorded by American country music artist Frankie Ballard. It was released in November 2015 as the first single from Ballard's third studio album, El Rio. The song was written by Jaren Johnston, Neil Mason and Jeremy Stover.

== Music video ==
The music video was directed by Marcel and premiered in March 2016.

== Charts ==
The song has sold 212,500 copies in the United States as of July 2016.

=== Weekly charts ===
Chart (2015–2016)	Peak position
Canada Country (Billboard)	50
US Bubbling Under Hot 100 (Billboard)	2
US Country Airplay (Billboard)	15
US Hot Country Songs (Billboard)	22

=== Year end charts ===
Chart (2016)	Position
US Country Airplay (Billboard)	57
US Hot Country Songs (Billboard)	56
