= Helluva Life =

Single by Frankie Ballard

from the album Sunshine & Whiskey
- Released: July 29, 2013
- Genre: Country
- Length: 3:51
- Label: Warner Bros. Nashville
- Songwriter(s): Rodney Clawson; Chris Tompkins; Josh Kear
- Producer(s): Marshall Altman; Scott Hendricks

Frankie Ballard singles chronology
"A Buncha Girls" (2011)	"Helluva Life" (2013)	"Sunshine & Whiskey" (2014)

"Helluva Life" is a song recorded by American country music artist Frankie Ballard. It was released in July 2013 as the first single from Ballard's second studio album, Sunshine & Whiskey, which was released on February 11, 2014. The song was written by Rodney Clawson, Chris Tompkins and Josh Kear.

== Content ==
"Helluva Life" is about a man thinking about his future while encountering a woman at a bar.

== Critical reception ==
Billy Dukes of Taste of Country gave the song three and half stars out of five, writing that "[Ballard is] a sincere vocalist who doesn’t try to stretch his capabilities and the blend of steel guitar that pins him down is just perfect." Dukes stated that the song "lacks specificity" but added that "the arrangement and the singer’s delivery tie the many elements together." Matt Bjorke of Roughstock gave the song four stars out of five, saying that "Frankie Ballard sings the melody with laid-back ease while the production never drowns out the singer as he sings about the things that make him grateful for his life." Bjorke praised the chorus, Ballard's performance and the "laid-back, less frenetic mood" of the song, predicting that it would become "the biggest hit of Frankie Ballard's career to date."

== Music video ==
The music video was directed by Mason Dixon and premiered in December 2013.

== Commercial performance ==
"Helluva Life" debuted at number 57 on the U.S. Billboard Country Airplay chart for the week of August 3, 2013. It also debuted at number 45 on the U.S. Billboard Hot Country Songs chart for the week of October 5, 2013. It also debuted at number 89 on the U.S. Billboard Hot 100 chart for the week of December 21, 2013. It also debuted at number 98 on the Canadian Hot 100 chart for the week of March 15, 2014. The song was certified Gold by the RIAA on May 6, 2014. As of May 2014, the song has sold 516,000 copies in the US.

== Charts and certifications ==
=== Weekly charts ===
Chart (2013–2014)	Peak position
Canada (Canadian Hot 100)	67
Canada Country (Billboard)	8
US Billboard Hot 100	51
US Country Airplay (Billboard)	1
US Hot Country Songs (Billboard)	8

=== Year-end charts ===
Chart (2013)	Position
US Country Airplay (Billboard)	98

Chart (2014)	Position
US Country Airplay (Billboard)	40
US Hot Country Songs (Billboard)	49

=== Certifications ===
Region	Certification	Certified units/sales
United States (RIAA)	Gold	516,000
