= Young & Crazy =

Single by Frankie Ballard

from the album Sunshine & Whiskey
- Released: January 12, 2015
- Genre: Country
- Length: 3:00
- Label: Warner Bros. Nashville
- Songwriters: Rhett Akins; Ashley Gorley; Shane McAnally
- Producer: Marshall Altman

Frankie Ballard singles chronology
"Sunshine & Whiskey" (2014)	"Young & Crazy" (2015)	"It All Started with a Beer" (2015)

"Young & Crazy" is a song recorded by American country music artist Frankie Ballard. It was released in January 2015 as the third single from Ballard's second studio album, Sunshine & Whiskey. The song was written by Rhett Akins, Ashley Gorley and Shane McAnally. The song was positively received by critics, who praised the lyrics and Ballard's vocal performance.

== Critical reception ==
Giving it an "A", Tammy Ragusa of Country Weekly wrote that "it's less in your face and more tongue-in-cheek thanks to the cleverly written lyric…'Young & Crazy' seems to have been tailor-made for Frankie who is the perfect mix of the rebel without a cause and the country boy next door."

== Commercial performance ==
The song first appeared on the Country Airplay chart on January 24, 2015. It debuted on the Hot Country Songs at No. 50 for chart dated March 14, 2015, and Billboard Hot 100 at No. 91 on chart date June 16, 2015. It peaked on the Hot 100 at No. 55 the chart date of August 29, 2015, and on Hot Country Songs at No. 8 for the chart date of September 5, 2015. On September 5, "Young & Crazy" also reached the top of the Country Airplay chart, giving Ballard his third consecutive number one hit. It was also the 100th chart topper on that chart. The song has sold 195,000 copies in the US as of September 2015.

== Music video ==
The music video was directed by Glen Rose and premiered in February 2015. It consists entirely of tour footage.

== Charts ==
Chart (2015)	Peak position
Canada Hot 100 (Billboard)	68
Canada Country (Billboard)	3
US Billboard Hot 100	55
US Country Airplay (Billboard)	1
US Hot Country Songs (Billboard)	8

=== Year-end charts ===
Chart (2015)	Position
US Country Airplay (Billboard)	2
US Hot Country Songs (Billboard)	44
