= Mark Kassa and Slight Return =

American musical band

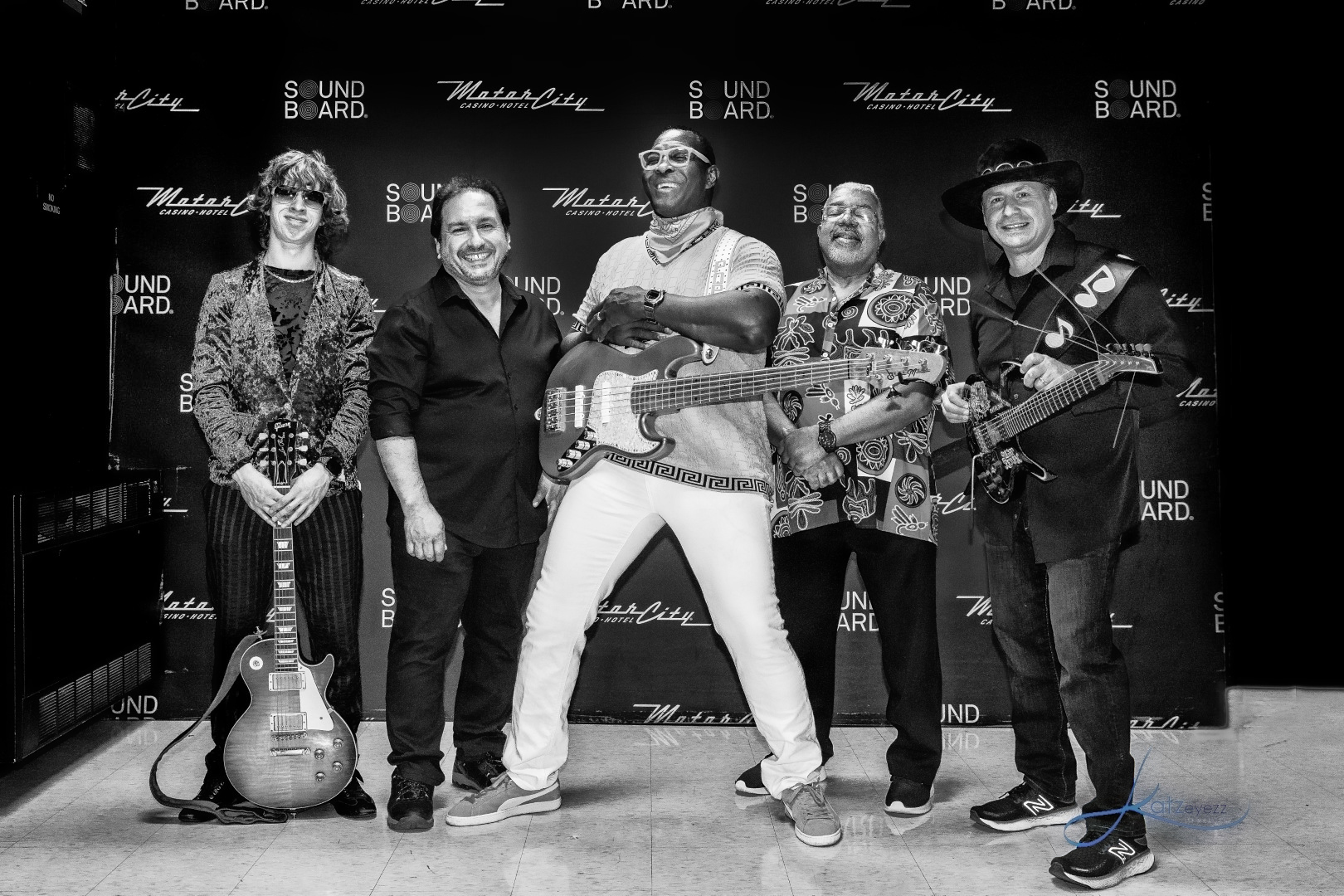

Background information
- Origin: Detroit, Michigan, U.S.
- Genres: rock; blues; funk
- Years active: 1996–present
- Members: Mark Kassa (guitar, vocals); William Pope (bass, vocals); Ronnie Karmo (drums); Tony Mitchell (percussion and vocals); Christian Vegh (guitar, vocals)
- Website: slightreturn.com

Mark Kassa and Slight Return is an American band from Detroit, Michigan. Their single "Weekend Homewreck" charted at #11 on Cashbox's top 50-rock airplay chart in 2021. They have shared the stage with artists including Gin Blossoms, Ted Nugent, Grand Funk Railroad, Tesla, and George Clinton. In 2026, their single "Welcome to the D" reached #9 on DRT’s (Digital Radio Tracker) Top 50 Rock Airplay chart and #17 on its Top 100 Independent Airplay chart.

== History ==
Mark Kassa and Slight Return was formed in 1996 by Mark Kassa (guitar, vocals) and was originally a three piece band. The trio received several major record deal offers but Kassa declined as he had young children at the time. The group's lineup has changed over the years and now includes band members Kassa (guitar, vocals) William Pope (bass, vocals), Ronnie Karmo (drums), Tony Mitchell (percussion and vocals), and Christian Vegh (guitar, vocals). Their genres have generally been classified as rock, blues, and funk and they have released 12 studio albums. In 2001, the band received a fair amount of national airplay on CMJ's music charts.

In 2017, the band won the WCSX "Band Wars" competition which included opening a show for Queensrÿche. In 2019, their singles, "Vicious Tides (featuring Andy Vargas)" and "Warrior's Soul (feat. Andy Vargas)" both charted in Cashbox airplay's top 20. In 2021, "Weekend Homewreck (featuring Christian Vegh)" charted at #11 on the same chart. The band won a Prestige Award for "Band of the Year" in 2022 and Kassa won "Guitar Player of the Year" as well as being inducted into the Prestige Award Hall of Fame in 2024.

The music group released the album, "The D," (featuring musicians George Clinton, Billy Cox, and Dennis Coffey in 2024, which received favorable reviews and in 2025, the group was the house band for Detroit's second annual "For the Love of Buddy Miles" tribute, sharing the stage with such musicians as Tony Lindsay, Derek St. Holmes, and Peter Keys. On July 10, 2026, the group headlined the annual Salute Our Warriors veterans’ ceremony and live music event at the Packard Proving Grounds in Shelby Charter Township, Michigan.

== Cashbox airplay charts ==
Year	Work	Category	
Year	Work	Category	US
2019	"Vicious Tides (featuring Andy Vargas)" (single)	Top 50 Rock Airplay	14
2019	"Warrior's Soul (feat. Andy Vargas)" (single)	Top 50 Rock Airplay	19
2021	"Weekend Homewreck (featuring Christian Vegh)" (single)	Top 50 Rock Airplay	11

== Discography ==
- 1997 - Red in the Face
- 2002 - Dynamic Stereo
- 2006 - Corporate Pig
- 2012 - Information Overload
- 2015 - Welcome to the D
- 2017 - Vicious Tides
- 2019 - Don't Take the Bait
- 2020 - The Sideshow
- 2022 - Turn the Page
- 2024 - The D
