= You'll Accomp'ny Me =

Single by Bob Seger & The Silver Bullet Band

from the album Against the Wind
- B-side: "Betty Lou's Gettin' Out Tonight"
- Released: July 1980
- Studio: Criteria (Miami)
- Genre: Soft rock, country rock
- Length: 4:00 (album version); 3:36 (single version)
- Label: Capitol
- Songwriter: Bob Seger
- Producers: Punch Andrews, Bob Seger

Bob Seger & The Silver Bullet Band singles chronology
"Against the Wind" (1980)	"You'll Accomp'ny Me" (1980)	"The Horizontal Bop" (1980)

"You'll Accomp'ny Me" is a song written and recorded by American rock singer Bob Seger. It appears on his album Against the Wind.

== Content ==
The song is in the key of E major with a main chord pattern of A–E.

== History ==
It reached number 14 on the Billboard Hot 100.

An entry in the Encyclopedia of Classic Rock describes the song as "forecast[ing] his career direction by crossing over onto Billboard's Adult Contemporary chart". Stephen Thomas Erlewine of Allmusic wrote in a review of Against the Wind that "the record really starts to kick into high gear with 'You'll Accomp'ny Me,' a ballad the equal of anything on its two predecessors." Jim Harrington of The Mercury News selected "You'll Accomp'ny Me" as one of Seger's 10 best songs and as his "best love song." Billboard said that it "starts out as a melodic ballad and gains almost inspirational momentum" by the end. Cash Box called it a "genteel mid-tempo romance," stating that "drum and woodblock set the rhythm, but piano and swelling organ provide the passion." Record World predicted the single would reach the Top 10, saying that Seger's inimitable vocals are backed by gospel-like chorus colors."

== Personnel ==
Credits are adapted from the liner notes of Seger's 1994 Greatest Hits compilation.

- Bob Seger – lead vocals, acoustic guitar

The Silver Bullet Band

- Chris Campbell – bass
- David Teegarden – drums

Additional musicians

- Ginger Blake – background vocals
- Sam Clayton – percussion
- Laura Creamer – background vocals
- Linda Dillard – background vocals
- Bill Payne – piano, organ, synthesizer

== Chart performance ==
Chart (1980)	Peak position
Canadian RPM Adult Contemporary	23
Canada Top Singles (RPM)	8
US Billboard Hot 100	14
US Adult Contemporary (Billboard)	17

== Other versions ==
Country music artist Frankie Ballard covered the song for his 2016 album El Río, and it was released to country radio in February 2017. The song charted at number 57, becoming Ballard's lowest-peaking single of his career.

French-Canadian Folk singer Anna McGarrigle wrote a French-language version of the song titled "Tu Vas M'Accompaneger". She performed it regularly at concerts during the 1980s, and it was included on Kate and Anna McGarrigle's 1982 album Love Over and Over.

Christine Albert included a version of the song where she altered between Bob Seger's original lyrics and Anna McGarrigle's French translation on her album Texafrance in 2008.
