= Her Strut =

1980 song by Bob Seger

Single by Bob Seger & The Silver Bullet Band

from the album Against the Wind
- A-side: "The Horizontal Bop"
- Released: 1980
- Recorded: Bayshore (Miami)
- Genre: Rock; hard rock
- Length: 3:51
- Label: Capitol
- Songwriter: Bob Seger
- Producer: Bill Szymczyk

"Her Strut" is a song written by Bob Seger that was first released on his 1980 album Against the Wind. It was also released as the B-side of his single "The Horizontal Bop." The song was inspired by feminist icon Jane Fonda.

== Music and lyrics ==
Like "The Horizontal Bop", and unlike the more successful previous singles from Against the Wind, "Her Strut" is a fast-paced rocker. Journalist Bill King described it as being "screechy voiced" and said it reminded him of the Eagles' song "The Long Run". Roy Trakin of The Daily News felt it lacked the drive of the more popular, slower songs from Against the Wind. But Arizona Daily Star critic Pam Parrish felt it has "the same rhythmic tension that characterized [earlier Seger fan favorites] 'The Fire Down Below' and 'Come to Poppa.'"

Some listeners criticized the lyrics of "Her Strut" for objectifying women. Music journalist Jimmy Guterman and arts editor Owen O'Donnell criticized "Her Strut" as a "bewildering lame ditty" whose singer "sounds like an aging high school football jerk who never grew out of thinking of 'girls' as either virgins or whores." Rolling Stone critic Dave Marsh criticized it for belittling women when they try to assert themselves. Seger objected to Marsh's accusation of misogyny stating "My God, I don't hate women. I'm for women standing up." Seger went on to state that he used the sexist sounding chorus because he liked the way the sound of the word "strut" worked in the song and that he attempted to counter any sexist connotations in the verses, saying:

But anyway, "Her Strut." The very title conjures up an image to me, ya know? And it's something I had to work my way around, 'cause saying "I love to watch her strut" is almost an automatic sexist thing. "Her Strut." I really struggled with that, I did. But I loved the hardness of the word "strut" in the song, ya know? And I worked real hard on the verses to try to put across the idea that this is not a sexist theme, that what I'm trying to say here is that at the bottom line it's human nature, that men are still gonna love women for being sexual in spite of all this other stuff. Women have to understand that it's still gonna be human nature. Can't turn off the hormones. I didn't wanna look like I'm some sort of sexist monster, and I'm not. I'm really not. Honest to God.

Seger has also stated that "Her Strut" was inspired by political activist Jane Fonda and her appearance before the Campaign for Economic Democracies. He stated "I was quite proud of her for doing that. I admired her crust. For going in there and having the strength to speak her mind, so I kind of wrote 'Her Strut' for an '80s woman ... you know, it was the dawn of the '80s, and I wanted to write a song about how women have become so confident and stepped out so much, and I thought Jane was a great role model." AXS critic Jeff Wallace feels that Seger succeeded in his objective stating that the song tells of "a strong independent woman and how she won't be controlled by anyone." Fonda has claimed to be flattered by the song, stating that "you’ll know why when you hear the lyrics."

== Personnel ==
Credits are adapted from the liner notes of Seger's 2003 Greatest Hits 2 compilation.

- Bob Seger – lead vocals, lead guitar

The Silver Bullet Band

- Drew Abbott – guitar
- Chris Campbell – bass
- David Teegarden – drums, percussion

== Other appearances ==
"Her Strut" was included on Seger's 2003 compilation album Greatest Hits 2 and on the 2011 compilation album Ultimate Hits: Rock and Roll Never Forgets. A live version of "Her Strut" was included on Seger's 1981 live album Nine Tonight.

"Her Strut" was featured in two video games in the 2000s: Grand Theft Auto IV in 2008 and Guitar Hero World Tour in 2009.
