= El Río (album) =

El Rio

Studio album by Frankie Ballard
- Released: June 10, 2016
- Genre: Country
- Label: Warner Bros. Nashville
- Producer: Marshall Altman

Frankie Ballard chronology
Sunshine & Whiskey (2014)	El Rio (2016)

Singles from El Rio
- 1. "It All Started with a Beer" Released: November 16, 2015; 2. "Cigarette" Released: August 8, 2016; 3. "You'll Accomp'ny Me" Released: February 13, 2017

El Rio is the third studio album by American country music artist Frankie Ballard. Produced by Marshall Altman, the album was released on June 10, 2016 via Warner Bros. Records. It includes the singles "It All Started with a Beer," "Cigarette," and "You'll Accomp'ny Me."

== Critical reception ==
Professional ratings
Review scores
Source	Rating
AllMusic	4/5 stars
One Country	3.5/5 stars
Rolling Stone	(Favorable)
Sounds Like Nashville	(Favorable)
Taste of Country	(Favorable)

El Rio received overwhelmingly positive reviews from critics, with several ranking it on their lists of best albums of 2016. Rolling Stone, which named the album one of the 25 Best Country & Americana Albums of 2016, noted that "Ballard's third album packs plenty of country-rock punch, with lyrics that reference Guns N' Roses and songs that evoke the rootsy sweep of the American heartland." Taste of Country lauded Ballard's work, including it on their list of 10 best albums of 2016 list, noting that El Rio was "reminiscent of a great ‘70s live album like Bob Seger's Live Bullet". The review further states that "Ballard excels as a vocalist and musician in space," with his "50-grit sandpaper voice dominat[ing] the album with previously unheard versatility." Annie Reuter writing for Sounds Like Nashville was hugely positive, calling El Rio a "standout release" and writing that "Frankie Ballard’s brand of country music borrows just as much from rock and roll as it does country and his latest release El Rio showcases both genres flawlessly," ultimately calling the album "a perfect blend of rock and country.

== Commercial performance ==
El Rio debuted on the Billboard 200 at No. 68, and on the Top Country Albums chart at No. 9, selling 7,000 copies in its first week. The album has sold 13,300 copies in the US as of August 2016.

== Track listing ==
No.	Title	Writer(s)	Length
1.	"El Camino"	Lee Thomas Miller; Chris Stapleton	3:28
2.	"Cigarette"	Kip Moore; Stapleton; Jaren Johnston	3:02
3.	"Wasting Time"	Jimmy Yeary; Craig Wiseman	3:43
4.	"Little Bit of Both"	Ben Hayslip; Chris Janson; Wiseman	3:52
5.	"L.A. Woman"	Frankie Ballard; Brad Warren; Brett Warren	4:28
6.	"It All Started with a Beer"	Johnston; Neil Mason; Jeremy Stover	4:19
7.	"Sweet Time"	Ballard; Johnston; Jon Nite	3:47
8.	"Good as Gold"	Mando Saenz; Justin Bogart	3:56
9.	"Southern Side"	Monty Criswell; Rick Huckaby	3:12
10.	"You'll Accomp'ny Me"	Bob Seger	4:03
11.	"You Could've Loved Me"	Dustin Christensen; Chris Gelbuda	5:23
Total length:			43:15

== Personnel ==
- Marshall Altman – acoustic guitar, percussion, piano, background vocals
- Frankie Ballard – acoustic guitar, electric guitar, percussion, lead vocals
- Bryan Dawley – dobro
- Sean Hurley – bass guitar
- Ken Johnson – background vocals
- Tim Lauer – keyboards
- Rob McNelley – acoustic guitar, electric guitar
- Aaron Sterling – drums, percussion

== Chart performance ==
=== Album ===
Chart (2016)	Peak position
US Billboard 200	68
US Top Country Albums (Billboard)	9
