= Frankie Ballard (album) =

Studio album by Frankie Ballard
- Released: May 24, 2011
- Genre: Country
- Length: 27:26
- Label: Reprise
- Producer: Michael Knox

Frankie Ballard chronology
| Frankie Ballard (2011) | Sunshine & Whiskey (2014) |

Singles from Frankie Ballard
- 1. "Tell Me You Get Lonely" Released: May 24, 2010; 2. "A Buncha Girls" Released: February 28, 2011

Frankie Ballard is the debut album by American country music singer Frankie Ballard. It was released on May 24, 2011 (see 2011 in country music) via Reprise Records Nashville.

== Content ==
The album includes the singles "Tell Me You Get Lonely" and "A Buncha Girls", both of which charted within the top 40 of Hot Country Songs. The closing track "Grandpa's Farm", co-written by Brent Cobb, Adam Hood, and Jason Saenz, would be covered six months later by David Nail as the opening track of his second studio album The Sound of a Million Dreams.

== Critical reception ==
Professional ratings
Review scores
| Source | Rating |
|---|---|
| Allmusic | 3/5 stars |
| Roughstock | 4/5 stars |

The album was rated three stars out of five on Allmusic, with reviewer Thom Jurek saying that it "doesn't have any inherently weak tracks, but it doesn't possess any extraordinarily strong ones, either." He thought that "A Buncha Girls" was the strongest song on the album, and that many of the songs showed a John Mellencamp influence. Bobby Peacock of Roughstock gave it 4 out of 5 stars, saying that "all eight songs are finely written and finely sung, showcasing his raw, gritty voice. The production is radio-friendly but still crisp, energetic and rocking, adding a high energy level to even the slower songs."

== Track listing ==
| No. | Title | Writer(s) | Length |
|---|---|---|---|
| 1. | "A Buncha Girls" | Frankie Ballard; Rhett Akins; Dallas Davidson; Ben Hayslip | 3:35 |
| 2. | "Single Again" | Akins; Craig Wiseman | 3:20 |
| 3. | "Place to Lay Your Head" | Akins; Davidson; Hayslip | 3:05 |
| 4. | "Tell Me You Get Lonely" | Davidson; Marty Dodson | 3:08 |
| 5. | "Get On Down the Road" | David Lee Murphy; Rivers Rutherford; Chuck Wicks | 3:15 |
| 6. | "Sober Me Up" | Davidson; Ashley Gorley | 3:35 |
| 7. | "Rescue Me" | Tim Nichols; Jonathan Singleton | 3:43 |
| 8. | "Grandpa's Farm" | Brent Cobb; Adam Hood; Jason Saenz | 3:46 |
| Total length: | | | 27:26 |

== Chart performance ==
| Chart (2011) | Peak position |
|---|---|
| US Top Country Albums (Billboard) | 33 |
