= Todd Carey =

American singer-songwriter

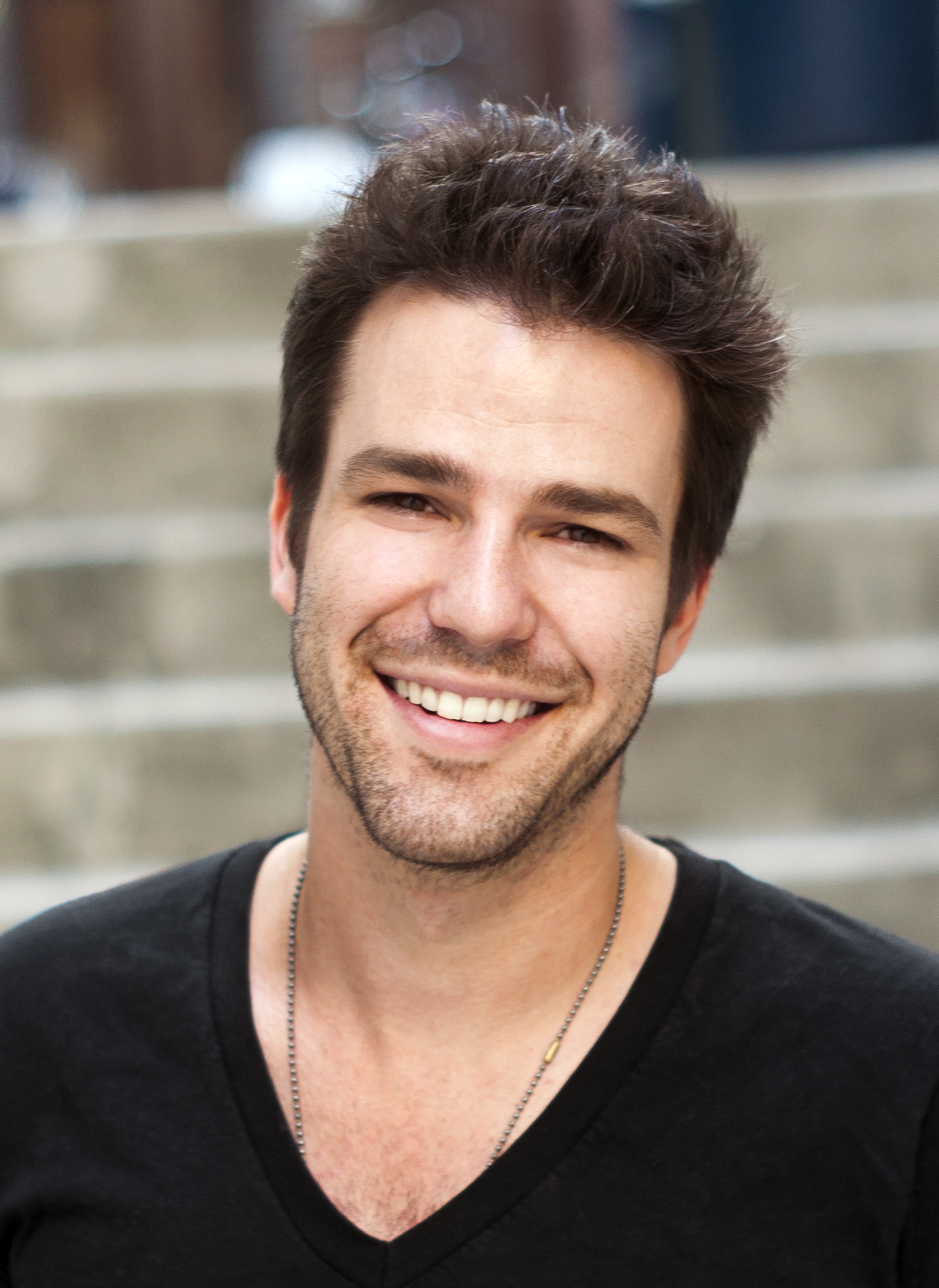

Background information
- Born: Winnetka, Illinois
- Origin: Winnetka, Illinois
- Genres: Pop, singer-songwriter
- Occupations: Musician, singer-songwriter
- Instruments: Vocals, guitar
- Years active: 2007–present
- Website: www.toddcareymusic.com

Todd Carey is an American singer, songwriter, musician, and internationally touring performer known for his singles Nintendo and Matthew McConaughey. His Nintendo which was number one on the Billboard Twitter Chart, has approximately 8,000,000 million Spotify streams. Matthew McConaughey, Infinity and Make Me Feel Good have garnered millions of streams on Spotify, Apple Music, and YouTube.

Carey's singles and solo albums have featured Sara Bareilles (Smile), Jake Miller, (Wanna Be), Shwazye (Too Soon, Matthew McConaughey) and Rolling Stones pianist and musical director Chuck Levell (Higher Love). His recordings have been included in playlists by editorial teams at Spotify (New Music Friday, Orbit), Apple Music (New in Alt, New in Pop).

Carey's music has been in numerous films including Palo Alto and films on the Hallmark and Lifetime channels. In 2023, his song Make Me Feel Good was featured in a nationwide Hyundai commercial.

Carey has toured throughout the US and UK. He has headlined at the City Winery venue, the main stage at Train’s 2023 Sail Across The Sun event and many festivals and venues. He has performed alongside Train, Andy Grammer, The 1975, Fall Out Boy and others. As a songwriter, he penned Meghan Trainor’s recording of 3AM which has 39,000,000 million Spotify streams and was included in her 2015 triple-platinum album title.

== Early life and education ==
Carey was born and raised in Winnetka, Illinois, a suburb north of Chicago. He is the first of two children born to Christine, a teacher/fashion designer, and Richard, an author and attorney. Growing up in a musically inclined family, Carey was exposed to various genres, including rock, pop, and R&B. He started playing the guitar and writing songs as a teenager, honing his skills and developing his distinct musical style.

Carey graduated from the University of Southern California, where he studied jazz guitar and literature. During his time in college, as leader of the jam band Telepathy and as a solo artist, he recorded for the defunct Kufala Recordings label and performed at Los Angeles venues eventually moving up to playing at the Knitting Factory, The Mint and the House of Blues. During his time in college he also played a small part in the Christopher Guest movie A Mighty Wind.

== Career ==
Upon graduation from university, Carey made the decision to pursue a career in music full-time. He has five albums:

=== Watching Waiting (2007) ===
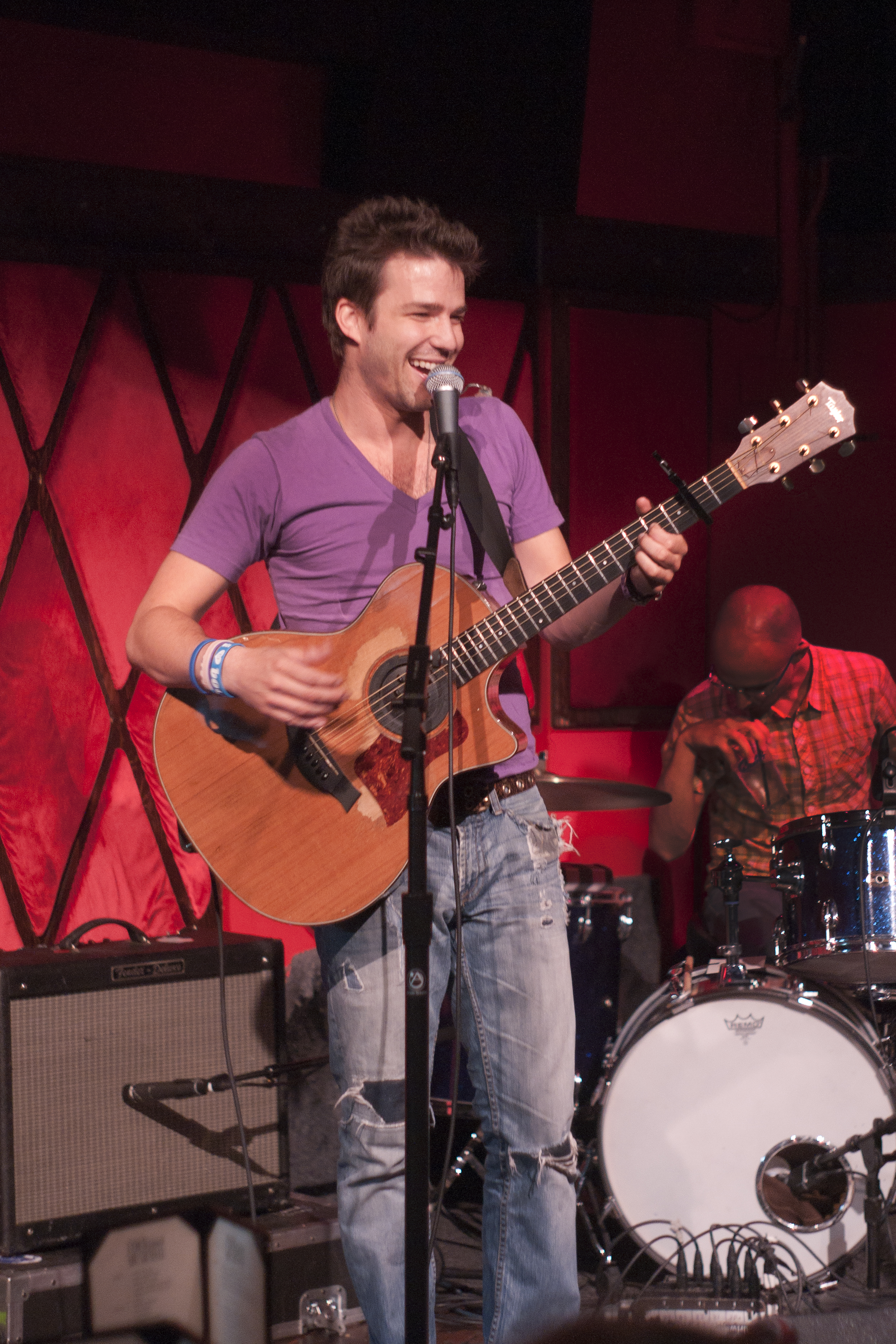
Carey playing at the Rockwood Music Hall in NYC in July 2011

Watching Waiting was released through Universal Music in 2007. The 12 track album showcased Careys talent as a singer-songwriter and guitarist, blending elements of pop and rock with introspective lyrics. The producer Marshall Altman (who also produced Eric Paslay, Natasha Bedingfield, William Fitzsimmons, Matt Nathanson) assembled a group of top studio musicians to back Carey for the recording sessions in Los Angeles. The release garnered very positive reviews in mainstream press. Music from the album (Aint't Got Love and Watching Waiting) was featured under the opening credits and throughout the film Palo Alto, CA, starring Tom Arnold and Ben Savage.

=== After The Morning After (2010) ===
In 2009, Carey visited record producer Mikal Blue in LA and gave him a burned CD of songs he had been working on. Blue responded and they began to work together at Revolver Recordings Studio quickly producing an album's worth of material.The first release from the Mikal Blue material was the March 30, 2010 single Gotta Be Next To You, which featured vocals from Amber Rubarth. This was followed up by the CD and iTunes release of After The Morning After EP on May 25, 2010, where it debuted in the top 40 on the iTunes pop charts.

=== Future Throwback (2016) ===
Carey spent over three years making Future Throwback which consists of 11 songs including Nintendo which became his biggest hit and the multi million streaming single and video.

=== Feel Good (2020) ===
The album Feel Good contains the hit Matthew McConaughey and Carey's singles featuring Sara Bareilles, Jake Miller and Shwayze, The album's 15 track list earned it a top spot on the iTunes Pre-order Chart, frequent Sirius radio play and as well as placements on numerous Spotify and Apple playlists.

=== Long Weekend (2023) ===
Long Weekend features the hit song Make Me Feel Good which was aired for months on National Network TV on a Hyundai commercial. The album contains songs featuring Chuck Leavell, Kash’d Out, Shwayze, and Ariza.

== Philanthropy ==
Carey started a charity foundation, Todd4Tatas, to benefit breast cancer after his mother was diagnosed with the disease. Proceeds from his You'll Shoot Your Eye Out tour went toward the foundation. Carey has also been involved in numerous other philanthropic endeavors, supporting organizations such as Musicians on Call and Songs of Love Foundation.

== Personal life ==
Carey resided in Los Angeles, Chicago, New York City in the past and now lives in St. Petersburg, Florida. He married Lindsay Lieberman in 2019 and has two children, Graysen and James.

== Discography ==
- Revolving World (2005)
- Whitefish Bay Sessions EP (2007)
- Watching Waiting (2007)
- After the Morning After EP (2010)
- Future Throwback (2016)
- Feel Good (2020)
- Long Weekend (2023)
