= A Buncha Girls =

Single by Frankie Ballard

from the album Frankie Ballard
- Released: February 28, 2011
- Recorded: 2011
- Genre: Country
- Length: 3:35
- Label: Reprise
- Songwriters: Frankie Ballard; Rhett Akins; Dallas Davidson; Ben Hayslip
- Producer: Michael Knox

Frankie Ballard singles chronology
"Tell Me You Get Lonely" (2010)	"A Buncha Girls" (2011)	"Helluva Life" (2013)

"A Buncha Girls" is a song co-written recorded by American country music artist Frankie Ballard. It was released in February 2011 as the second single from his debut album Frankie Ballard. Ballard wrote the song with Rhett Akins, Dallas Davidson, and Ben Hayslip, who comprise The Peach Pickers.

== Critical reception ==
Amy Sciarretto of Taste of Country gave the song a favorable review, writing that Ballard "espouses the virtues of carefree girls in his rawk ‘n’ roll-meets-country drawl." Matt Bjorke of Roughstock gave the song four stars out of five, saying that "what we have here is a delightful radio-ready song that will have the guys noddin’ their heads to the song while the girls shimmy and shake and sing-a-long."

== Music video ==
The music video was directed by Jim Wright and premiered in May 2011.

== Chart performance ==
"A Buncha Girls" debuted at number 59 on the U.S. Billboard Hot Country Songs chart for the week of March 5, 2011.

Chart (2011)	Peak position
US Hot Country Songs (Billboard)	27

=== Year-end charts ===
Chart (2011)	Position
US Country Songs (Billboard)	100
