= Sunshine & Whiskey =

Studio album by Frankie Ballard
- Released: February 11, 2014
- Genre: Country
- Length: 37:57
- Label: Warner Bros. Nashville
- Producers: Marshall Altman; Scott Hendricks; Michael Knox

Frankie Ballard chronology
Frankie Ballard (2011)	Sunshine & Whiskey (2014)	El Rio (2016)

Singles from Sunshine & Whiskey
- 1. "Helluva Life" Released: July 29, 2013; 2. "Sunshine & Whiskey" Released: April 14, 2014; 3. "Young & Crazy" Released: January 12, 2015

Sunshine & Whiskey is the second studio album by American country music artist Frankie Ballard. It was released on February 11, 2014 via Warner Bros. Records. The album includes Ballard's debut single "Tell Me You Get Lonely" and "Helluva Life," which became Ballard's first number one hit. Unlike its uptempo version on the album, "Don't Tell Mama I Was Drinking" was previously recorded as a ballad under the title "Don't Tell Mama" by three artists: Ty Herndon on his 1996 album Living in a Moment, Gary Allan on his 1999 album Smoke Rings in the Dark, and Doug Stone on his 2007 album My Turn.

== Critical reception ==
Professional ratings
Review scores
Source	Rating
AllMusic	3.5/5 stars
The Oakland Press	3/4 stars
Roughstock	4/5 stars
USA Today	2.5/4 stars

Sunshine & Whiskey received generally positive reviews from four music critics. At USA Today, Brian Mansfield rated the album two-and-a-half stars out of four, writing that Ballard's "got an appealing rock delivery, and the songs get more thoughtful as he goes along, right to the tragedy at the end." Gary Graff of The Oakland Press rated the album three out of four stars, stating that it is "evident throughout these 11 songs [are] highly contagious", and they "go down like a well-aged single malt." At AllMusic, Steve Leggett rated the album three-and-a-half out of five stars, saying that "most contemporary country fans should love this album, and there are tracks here where Ballard hits everything right, rising above the commercially generic with energy and intelligence." Matt Bjorke of Roughstock rated the album four stars out of five, stating how Ballard stays true to himself on the album.

== Track listing ==
No.	Title	Writer(s)	Length
1.	"Young & Crazy"	Rhett Akins; Ashley Gorley; Shane McAnally	3:00
2.	"Sunshine & Whiskey"	Jaren Johnston; Luke Laird	3:02
3.	"It Don't Take Much"	Frankie Ballard; Jon Nite	3:18
4.	"Helluva Life"	Rodney Clawson; Josh Kear; Chris Tompkins	3:52
5.	"Drinky Drink"	Johnston; Laird	2:59
6.	"Tell Me You Get Lonely"	Dallas Davidson; Marty Dodson	3:09
7.	"Sober Me Up"	Connors; Davidson; Gorley	3:37
8.	"I'm Thinking Country"	Marcel Chagnon; David Lee Murphy	2:51
9.	"Tip Jar"	Monty Criswell	3:53
10.	"Don't You Wanna Fall"	Travis Meadows; Jeremy Spillman	3:54
11.	"Don't Tell Mama I Was Drinking"	Buddy Brock; Jerry Laseter; Kim Williams	4:14
Total length:			37:57

== Personnel ==
Musicians

- Laura Allen – handclapping, background vocals
- Marshall Altman – handclapping, percussion, background vocals
- Jean Arnellano – handclapping, background vocals
- Frankie Ballard – banjo, handclapping, acoustic guitar, electric guitar, nylon string guitar, lead vocals, background vocals, Wurlitzer
- Cassidy Brown – handclapping, background vocals
- Wendel Burt – handclapping, background vocals
- Colette Busch – handclapping, background vocals
- Perry Coleman – background vocals
- Marlene Cooper – handclapping, background vocals
- Dan Dugmore – pedal steel guitar
- Shannon Forrest – drums
- Tony Harrell – Hammond B-3 organ
- Wes Hightower – background vocals
- Jedd Hughes – electric guitar
- Ken Johnson – background vocals
- Mike Johnson – steel guitar
- Jaren Johnston – beat box
- David LaBruyere – bass guitar
- Luke Laird – beat box
- Troy Lancaster – electric guitar
- Tim Lauer – harmonica, keyboards, organ, piano
- Cassandra Lawson – background vocals
- Tony Lucido – bass guitar
- Jeremy Lutito – bass guitar, drums
- Sonya McDole – handclapping, background vocals
- Rob McNelley – electric guitar
- Geneva Manchester – handclapping, background vocals
- Helen Miles – handclapping, background vocals
- Greg Morrow – drums
- Jason Mowery – acoustic guitar, resonator guitar, mandolin
- Russ Pahl – steel guitar
- Carmen Plumb – handclapping, background vocals
- Alison Prestwood – bass guitar
- Danny Rader – acoustic guitar
- Rich Redmond – percussion
- Anna Riggi – handclapping, background vocals
- Dean Riggi – handclapping, background vocals
- Eddie Robinson – electric guitar, slide guitar
- Amanda Shelton – handclapping, background vocals
- Tawnie Shelton – handclapping, background vocals
- Adam Shoenfeld – electric guitar
- Lisa Torres – background vocals
- Ilya Toshinsky – banjo, resonator guitar
- John Wilson – handclapping, background vocals
- Kim Wilson – handclapping, background vocals

Production

- Marshall Altman – digital editing, overdub engineer, producer, vocal engineer
- LeAnn Bennett – production coordinator
- Drew Bollman – mixing assistant
- Pete Coleman – engineer, mixing
- Paul "Paco" Cossette – assistant engineer
- Brandon Epps – editing engineer
- Shalacy Griffin – production assistant
- Mike "Frog" Griffith – production coordinator
- Scott Hendricks – producer
- Erik "Keller" Jahner – mixing assistant
- Scott Johnson – production assistant
- Jaren Johnston – programming
- Peter King – digital editing
- Michael Knox – producer
- Luke Laird – programming
- Steve Marcantonio – engineer
- Sam Martin – assistant engineer
- Andrew Mendelson – mastering
- Justin Niebank – mixing
- Reid Shippen – engineer, mixing
- Angela Talley – assistant engineer
- Shane Tarleton – creative director
- Chris Tompkins – programming

== Chart performance ==
The album debuted at No. 5 in the Top Country Albums chart, and No. 35 in the Billboard 200, with sales of 11,000 for the week. As of June 2016, the album has sold 105,000 copies in the US.

=== Weekly charts ===
Chart (2014)	Peak position
US Billboard 200	35
US Top Country Albums (Billboard)	5

=== Year-end charts ===
Chart (2014)	Position
US Top Country Albums (Billboard)	68
