= We vs. Death =

Dutch post-rock band

We vs. Death was a Dutch instrumental post-rock band, founded in 2000.

== History ==
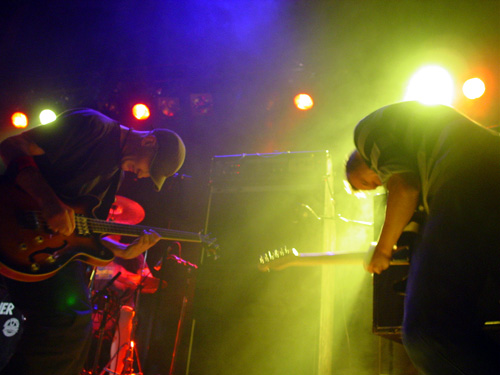
We vs. Death live in Theater Kikker, Utrecht

In the second half of 2000 a couple of like-minded musicians find each other at Utrecht University in Netherlands and decide to start a band. The band's name was initially Dylman's Disco Method, but after a while was changed to We vs. Death. Almost right away they chose to make instrumental post-rock.

We vs. Death played large venues such as Paradiso, 013, Vera and Tivoli as well as small-scale venues and squats like the ACU and the OCCII. Outside The Netherlands, they played venues in Belgium, England, Canada, France, Russia, Poland, Denmark, Germany and Japan.

== Discography ==
=== 7-inch ===
Their first vinyl-single was released in 2001 on the Zabel Muziek music-label. This single contained four songs:

1. MK Ultra
2. HMV
3. Awful Exchange
4. Heron

=== Split-CD with Tom Sweetlove ===
In 2003 the band released a split-CD with the Belgian post-rock band Tom Sweetlove. Each band contributed four songs for this release, titled "The Message Is", that was released on the Dutch Zabel Muziek-label and the Belgian Matamore-label. The We vs. Death-songs on this CD are:

1. My Dog is Watching Me
2. City Council Cosmos
3. Consertina
4. Wave Goodbye With Your Little Hand

=== Split-CD with Green Concorde ===
In 2004 the band decided upon releasing a split-CD again, this time together with the Danish indie rock band Green Concorde. On this album, released on Zabel Muziek and Eglantine Records, appeared the following We vs. Death songs:

1. Pictures From Stellenbosch
2. Workers Are Referred To As "Hands"
3. Wake 44

=== We Too Are Concerned / We Are Too Concerned ===
After releasing the 7-inch EP on two split-CDs, the band released their full-length debut in Spring 2006. The CD-package also contained a DVD and a booklet with a short story from artist Jeremiah Day. The CD, again released on the Zabel Muziek-label contains eight tracks:

1. And How To Translate It
2. Pictures From Stanford
3. Snow Cushioned The Fall
4. One Light Will Do
5. Thomas Corner And The Valley Houses
6. (Yes,) We Went To Novgorod
7. Mother And Father And Me
8. Fieldfire

=== A Black House, A Coloured Home ===
In 2009 the band released their second full-length album. The album marked a slight change in style, and was their first release on Beep! Beep! Back Up The Truck. Due to that label's exclusive deal with torrentsite Mininova, the album was put on that site as a download two weeks before the actual release.

1. The Things You Did
2. Hands
3. The Sun
4. Mirage
5. Collection Of Stones
6. Black Map
7. Golden Medals

== Line-up ==
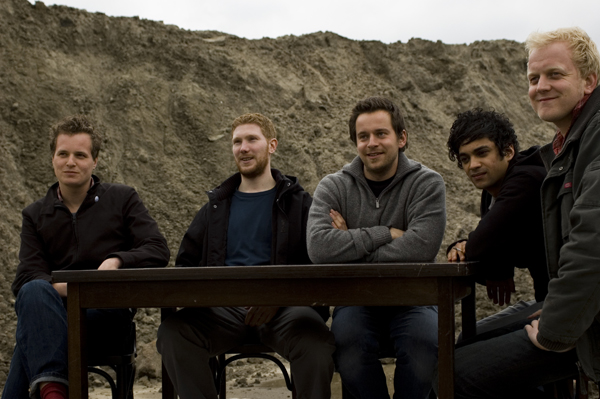
Starting left: Wouter, Marten, Paul, Thomas, Gerben. Photo by Maarten Houwer

The lineup underwent a few changes in the beginning then remained stable for years, until 2006, when guitarist Bart de Kroon left the band and was replaced with Thomas Sohilait. The final line-up consisted of:

- Marten Timan (bass)
- Thomas Sohilait (guitar)
- Paul Hoek (trumpet and concertina)
- Wouter Kors (guitar)
- Gerben Houwer (drums)
