= Against the Wind (Bob Seger song) =

- Artwork for US single, also used for parent album

Single by Bob Seger & The Silver Bullet Band

from the album Against the Wind
- B-side: "No Man's Land"
- Released: April 1980
- Recorded: 1979
- Studio: Bayshore (Miami)
- Genre: Heartland rock; soft rock; roots rock
- Length: 5:34 (album version); 3:45 (single version)
- Label: Capitol
- Songwriter: Bob Seger
- Producer: Bill Szymczyk

Bob Seger & The Silver Bullet Band singles chronology
"Fire Lake" (1980)	"Against the Wind" (1980)	"You'll Accomp'ny Me" (1980)

"Against the Wind" is a song written and recorded by the American singer-songwriter Bob Seger for his eleventh studio album of the same name. It was released as the second single from the album in April 1980 through Capitol Records. Seger recorded the ballad during a two-year process that began his eleventh album; it was recorded with producer Bill Szymczyk at Criteria Studios in north Miami, Florida. Sonically, "Against the Wind" is a mid-tempo soft rock tune with piano backing. It was recorded with Seger's Silver Bullet Band, and features backing vocals from Eagles co-frontman Glenn Frey.

"Against the Wind" explores the space between care and indifference from friends and loved ones. It centers on maturation and memories, like many other Seger songs, and carries a tender, mellow tone. Seger pulled from his high school years as a cross-country runner to form the song's title–a metaphor for growing old. "Against the Wind" became one of Seger's most successful singles, reaching number five on the Billboard Hot 100. It also charted in Canada, Australia, and Belgium. It received high marks from music critics, with many praising Seger's songwriting. The song has been celebrated by generations of country artists, with covers by Garth Brooks and Brooks & Dunn.

== Background ==
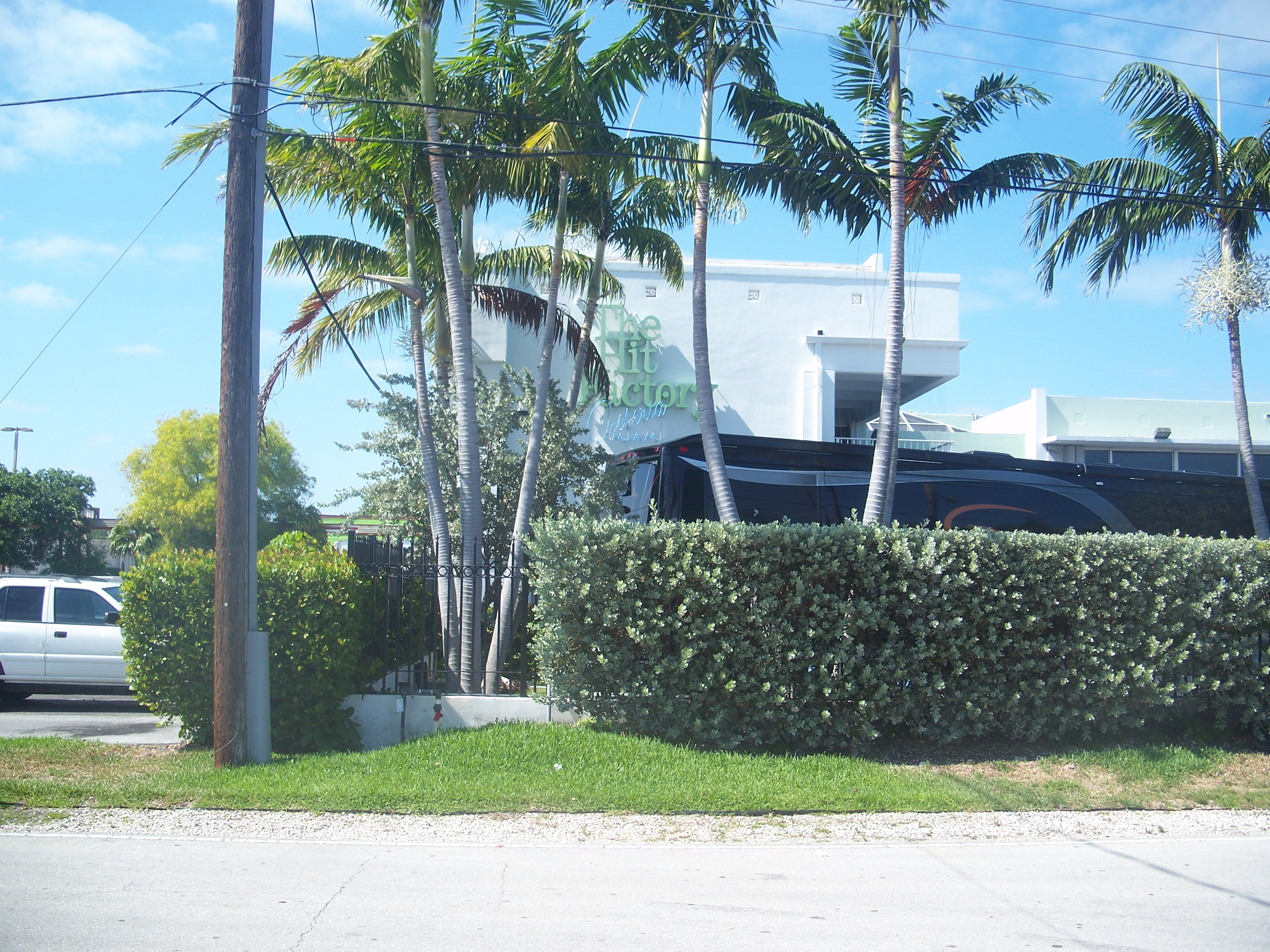
The song was recorded at Criteria Studios in north Miami, Florida.

"Against the Wind" developed over a two-year period when Seger was recording its parent album. He was driven by the desire to have a number one album, and aimed to record hit singles for his eleventh album, emphasizing a deliberately commercial sound. Seger felt more comfortable than before working in the studio. He personally opened up more to others, and distinguished it as the most fulfilled he had felt as a songwriter to that point.

For Against the Wind, he worked with Eagles producer Bill Szymczyk. The recording process was handled at higher-quality studios than before, with an emphasis on polish and getting "things right." The song includes backing vocals from Eagles singer-songwriter Glenn Frey. Seger and Frey had met in the mid-1960s when they were both working the Detroit club scene, and had remained close since; a year prior, Seger co-wrote and made a guest appearance on the Eagles' "Heartache Tonight".

== Themes ==
Like much of its parent album, "Against the Wind" is a mellow, mid-tempo ballad with country-rock overtones. Steve Pond at Rolling Stone identified it as one of many Seger "mediums": mid-tempo tunes with "loping tempos, [and] subdued instrumentation." Lyrically, "Against the Wind" centers on growing older, and finds Seger confronting his memories and yearning for the simplicity of past times. It returns to familiar nostalgic territory for Seger; he characterized "Wind" as the final part in a trilogy of sentimental songs, following "Night Moves" and "Brave Strangers". During an interview, Seger said that "Against the Wind" came about from his days as a high-school cross country runner. He described the song as "about trying to move ahead, keeping your sanity and integrity at the same time."

A writer at Billboard described "Against the Wind" as "a mid-tempo folky tale of young love featuring pretty piano backing"; Seger references a "Janey" in the opening lyrics of the song; this refers to Janey Dinsdale, with whom he had a long-term relationship from 1972 until 1983. In Rolling Stone, Seger elaborated on the song's meaning:

Janey says to me all the time, 'You allow more people to walk on you than anybody I've ever known.' And I always say it's human nature that people are gonna love you sometimes and they're gonna use you sometimes. Knowing the difference between when people are using you and when people truly care about you, that's what "Against the Wind" is all about. The people in that song have weathered the storm, and it's made them much better that they've been able to do it and maintain whatever relationship. To get through is a real victory.

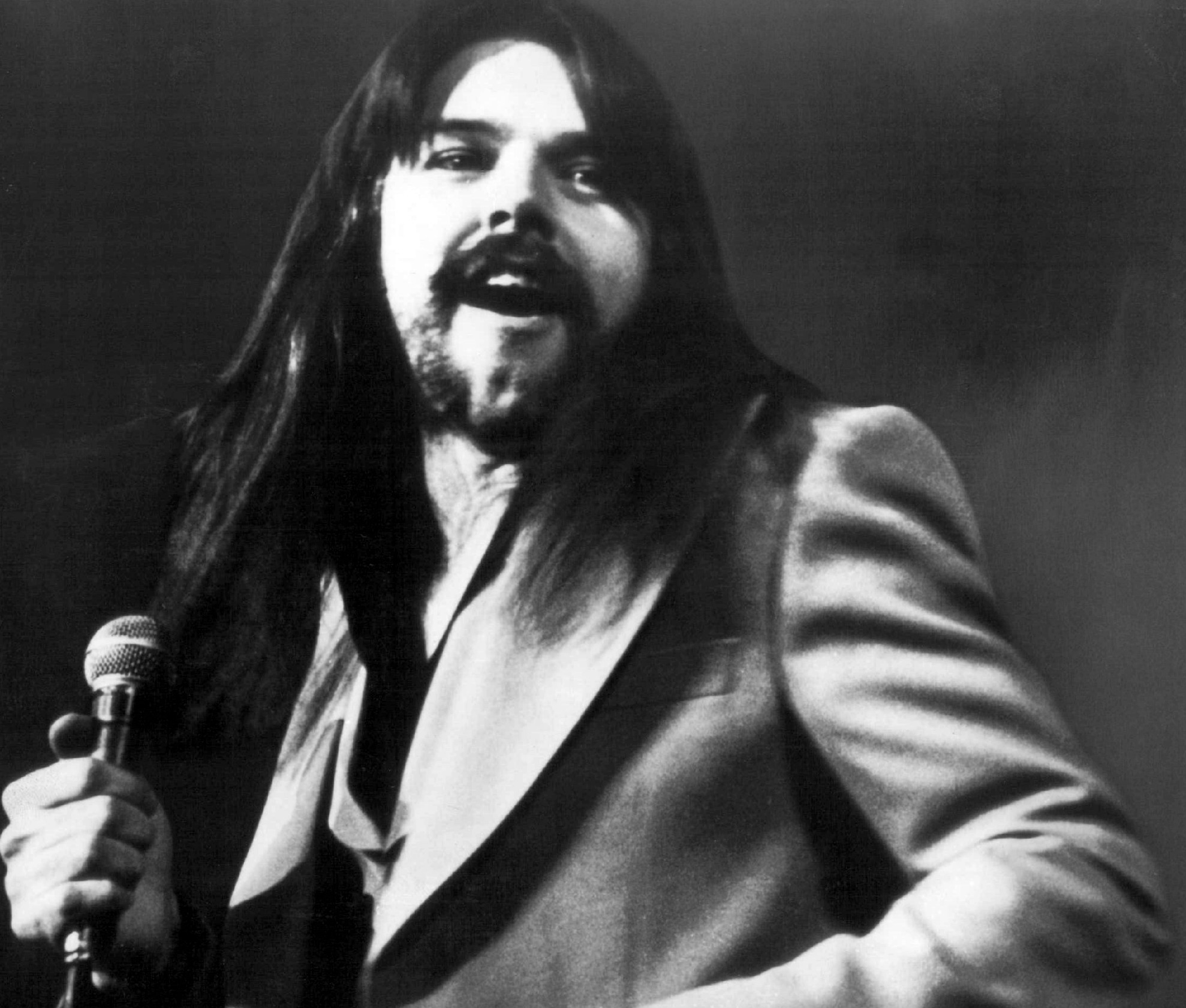
Seger, seen here in 1977, wrote the song about growing old.

In the tune, Seger second-guesses his career choice, particularly aspects of touring, which he describes as "moving eight miles a minute for months at a time." He mulls that he may have "lost [his] way," focusing too much attention on "breaking all of the rules that would bend." It famously includes the line "Wish I didn't know now what I didn't know then", which Seger later admitted bothered him for a while in a grammatical sense. The song "ends with a renewed determination to keep going"; as the song begins its outro, Seger concedes he is "older now, but still running against the wind."

Its tone has been described as reflective and bittersweet. New York Times columnist Jon Pareles once characterized "Against the Wind" as a song about "crumbling hopes and the recognition of limits," while music critic Maury Dean considered its topic "all the burdens we'll ever have to face." Robert Hilburn, writing for the Los Angeles Times, described the song a "heartfelt expressions of the search for innocence and integrity in a world where both qualities seem in short supply." Though no music video was made for "Against the Wind" at the time of its release, a lyric video commemorating its fortieth anniversary saw release on YouTube in 2020. The clip showcases its songwriting atop "classic Seger imagery — animated horses, motorcycles, and vast American highways."

== Commercial performance ==
"Against the Wind" was issued as the second single from its titular album in April 1980. Seger had no interest as to which songs were released as singles, and he simply left it up to Capitol to decide; "Wind" was chosen by the label's promotional director, Steve Meyer.

"Against the Wind" debuted at number 54 on the Hot 100 in the week ending May 3, 1980; it was the highest-debuting single of the week. It moved into the top 30 the following week, and moved into the top ten at the end of the month. It reached its peak at number five on the Hot 100 on June 14. It held at the position for three weeks. After that, it began its descent from the top, and last appeared on the chart on August 23; it remained on the chart as a whole for seventeen weeks, with eleven of those spent in the top 40. During this time, the single also climbed the magazine's Hot Adult Contemporary chart, where it peaked at number seven.

Internationally, the song was successful as well. In Canada, it reached number six on the all-genre singles chart compiled by RPM. It reached the lowest position on Belgium's top 30 chart in January 1981, and peaked at 92 on Australian Kent Music Report.

== Critical reception ==
Rolling Stone critic Dave Marsh stated in his review of the Against the Wind album that none of the ballads (including the title track) contained any memorable lines, but he later amended that to acknowledge that the lines "Well, those drifter's days are past me now/I've so much more to think about/Deadlines and commitments/What to leave in/What to leave out" are not only memorable but also haunting in the way Seger "haltingly expresses his indecisiveness." Hilburn at the Los Angeles Times praised Seger's "timeless, often graceful Everyman edge" he lends to "Against the Wind" and its "tension between the idealism that [he] searches and the pitfalls in realizing the dreams." Cash Box called it a "thoughtful ballad," saying that the "light folk guitar melody is perfectly punctuated by piano touches and subdued rhythm." Cash Box also called the vocal phrasing and lyrics "compelling."

A Rolling Stone reader's poll ranked "Against the Wind" as the third-best Seger tune. Classic Rock History critic Janey Roberts rated it as Seger's 4th best song, calling it "one of the most beautiful songs he had written in his career".

== Legacy ==
"Against the Wind" has remained one of Seger's most popular songs; upon his arrival to streaming services in 2017, it ranked his second-most streamed song, behind "Night Moves". "Against the Wind" was famously used in a scene of the 1994 film Forrest Gump, where the main character runs across the U.S.; it was included on its accompanying soundtrack album.

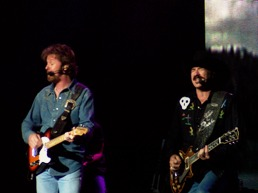
A cover by country stars Brooks & Dunn charted in 1999.

"Against the Wind" has been celebrated by generations of contemporary country artists. Toby Keith's 1994 single "Wish I Didn't Know Now" borrows a lyric from "Against the Wind". Brooks & Dunn performed a cover of the song in 1999 that charted at number 55 on the Hot Country Songs charts based on unsolicited airplay. Of the duo, Ronnie Dunn called it one of the songs that shaped his taste, and suggested it influenced "This is one of those songs that, lyrically, we tried to write at the end of the Nineties. We were just taking Seger's era of rock and applying it to what we were doing in country at the time." Later stars, like Jason Aldean, offered similar remarks: "You listen to a song like 'Against the Wind' and you’re hanging on every word of the thing. You can’t help but be drawn into it." Vince Gill singled out "Against the Wind" as a composition he felt rivaled the work of Lennon-McCartney or Paul Simon. Garth Brooks recorded a cover of the song for a 2016 box set, as did The Highwaymen for their debut album. Other artists from varying genres have also covered the tune; alternative rock group The Hold Steady released their version of the song on their 2007 extended play, Stuck Between Stations.

== Personnel ==
Credits are adapted from the liner notes of Seger's 1994 Greatest Hits compilation.

- Bob Seger – lead vocals, acoustic guitar, background vocals

The Silver Bullet Band

- Drew Abbott – electric guitar
- Chris Campbell – bass
- David Teegarden – drums

Additional musicians

- Glenn Frey – background vocals
- Paul Harris – piano, organ

== Chart performance ==
=== Weekly charts ===
Chart performance for "Against the Wind"
Chart (1980–81)	Peak position
Australia (Kent Music Report)	92
Belgium (Ultratop 50 Flanders)	30
Canada Top Singles (RPM)	6
US Billboard Hot 100	5
US Adult Contemporary (Billboard)	8

=== Year-end charts ===
Chart (1980)	Rank
Canada Top 100 (RPM)	41
US Top Pop Singles (Billboard)	51

== Certifications ==
Region	Certification	Certified units/sales
New Zealand (RMNZ)	Platinum	30,000^{‡}
United States (RIAA)	Platinum	1,000,000^{‡}
^{‡} Sales+streaming figures based on certification alone.
