= Watching Waiting =

Studio album by Todd Carey
- Released: March 27, 2007 (US)
- Recorded: October 2006 at: The Galt Line (Burbank, California); Track Record Studios (North Hollywood, California); Zuss Studio (Studio City, California)
- Genre: Alternative Rock, singer-songwriter
- Length: 49:47
- Label: High Wire Music/Fontana, Inspiration Factory Records
- Producer: Marshall Altman

Todd Carey chronology
Revolving World (2005)	Watching Waiting (2007)	After the Morning After EP (2010)

Watching Waiting is the first studio solo album of singer-songwriter Todd Carey. It was distributed by High Wire Music/Fontana in the US on March 27, 2007.

== History ==
Carey had recorded his previous albums, including his previous solo effort Elevate, largely with his own production. After moving to Chicago sometime after graduation from the University of Southern California for a music degree, he began work again on assembling demos for another record. He sent some of these demos out to producers and heard back from Marshall Altman, who was interested in working with him. Before the scheduled recording session back in California for the album, Altman tasked Carey to record the whole album solo and acoustically to get a feel for the record. Carey spent a week and a half up in his parents' summer home in Whitefish Bay, Wisconsin and began working on the acoustic tracks. During this time he also came up with new material, including writing the title track "Watching Waiting". These acoustic tracks would later be released as an acoustic EP, The Whitefish Bay Sessions EP.

When Carey arrived back in California to record at Altman's studio, the Galt Line, in Burbank, he asked if he could have his friend from USC sit in during the recording. Altman eventually agreed and Eric Robinson was brought in. Robinson and Altman would later become friends and Robinson later worked as an engineer at Altman's Galt Line, collaborating on many albums together. Robinson also brought a female artist he knew, Sara Bareilles to come in and record background vocals for the song "Smile".

== Songs in media ==
Two songs from the album "Ain't Got Love" and "Watching Waiting" were used as part of the soundtrack to the 2007 movie Palo Alto, of which Eric Robinson and Marshall Altman worked as musical directors for. Songs from the album were also featured on MTV's The Real World television show.

== Track listing ==
All songs written by Todd Carey, except for "Masterpiece" which was written by Todd Carey/Marshall Altman and "Goodbye to Another One" which was written by Todd Carey/Marshall Altman/Jim Tullio.

No.	Title	Length
1.	"Ain't Got Love"	3:20
2.	"Back Off Baby"	3:26
3.	"Friday Night"	3:59
4.	"Smile"	3:27
5.	"Watching Waiting"	5:14
6.	"Elaine"	3:18
7.	"Falling from Grace"	3:31
8.	"King of Cliche"	5:51
9.	"Photograph"	4:07
10.	"Ride the Wave"	3:28
11.	"Masterpiece"	5:18
12.	"Goodbye to Another One"	4:48
13.	"The Stranger"	5:02

== Personnel ==
=== Musicians ===
- Todd Carey: vocals, lead guitars, electric and acoustic guitars, backing vocals
- Michael Chaves: electric guitar
- Jonathan Athens: bass
- Ben West: piano, Wurlitzer, Hammond, Rhodes, keyboards, xylophone
- Aaron Sterling: drums, percussion
- Jonathan Ahrens: bass
- Eric Robinson: lap steel ("Ride the Wave")
- Marshall Altman: backing vocals, percussion
- Sara Bareilles: background vocals ("Smile")

=== Production ===
- Marshall Altman: producer, arranger, recorder
- Todd Carey: arranger
- Eric Robinson: recorder
- Niko Bolas: recorder
- Ben West: recorder
- Brian Malouf: mixer
- Eddy Schreyer: masterer
- Laura Crosta: photography, art direction, design
- David Blutenthal: manager
