= Against the Wind (album) =

Studio album by Bob Seger & the Silver Bullet Band
- Released: February 25, 1980
- Studios: Bayshore (Miami); Criteria (Miami); Muscle Shoals (Sheffield)
- Genre: Heartland rock
- Length: 40:24
- Label: Capitol
- Producers: Bob Seger; Punch Andrews; Muscle Shoals Rhythm Section; Bill Szymczyk

Bob Seger & the Silver Bullet Band chronology
Stranger in Town (1978)	Against the Wind (1980)	Nine Tonight (1981)

Singles from Against the Wind
- 1. "Fire Lake" Released: February 1980; 2. "Against the Wind" Released: April 1980; 3. "You'll Accomp'ny Me" Released: July 1980; 4. "The Horizontal Bop/Her Strut" Released: October 1980

Against the Wind is the eleventh studio album by American rock singer Bob Seger and his third which credits the Silver Bullet Band. Like many of his albums, about half of the tracks feature the Muscle Shoals Rhythm Section as backing musicians. It was released in February 1980. It was Seger's only number-one album, spending six weeks at the top of the Billboard Top LPs chart, knocking Pink Floyd's The Wall from the top spot. Seger said that the album "is about trying to move ahead, keeping your sanity and integrity at the same time."

== Release ==
Against the Wind was an immediate commercial success, reaching No. 2 on the Billboard 200 album chart in its third week and remaining there for five weeks behind Pink Floyd's The Wall before reaching No. 1 and holding the top position for six weeks. By late 1981 the album sold 3.7 million copies in the United States and was certified 5× platinum by the Recording Industry Association of America in 2003.

Bob Seger and the Silver Bullet Band won the 1980 Grammy Award for Best Rock Performance by a Duo or Group with Vocal for the album Against the Wind and Capitol Records art director Roy Kohara won the Grammy Award for Best Recording Package.

== Critical reception ==
Professional ratings
Review scores
Source	Rating
AllMusic	4/5 stars
Billboard	(unrated)
Robert Christgau	C+
Record Mirror	3.5/5 stars
Smash Hits	5/10

Rock critic Dave Marsh, writing for Rolling Stone, strongly criticized the album as a betrayal of Seger's longtime fans: "I'd like to say that this is not only the worst record Bob Seger has ever made, but an absolutely cowardly one as well" saying that Seger had crafted "failureproof songs that are utterly listenable and quite meaningless." Marsh had followed Seger since before Night Moves, when Seger finally gained national fame, and said in his review that Seger's long, tireless struggle to stardom is trivialized by this record. "He had to fight hard to prove there was still a place in rock & roll for a guy like him, and, with Night Moves, he won. This is the LP that makes such a victory meaningless ... It makes me sad, and it makes me angry (another emotion that's disappeared here, though it's often fueled Seger's finest work)."

Marsh did concede that on the album "Seger sings fantastically well" and called it a "carefully constructed album." A review in The Boston Phoenix echoed some of Marsh's criticisms, saying that Seger offered nothing that hadn't been heard before or equaled his best work, "only heavy-handed efforts to simulate it."

In a more positive review in the Los Angeles Times, critic Robert Hilburn said the album was "close to [Seger's] earlier works" but represented a "mastering of the form" and that the reflective ballads stood out. John Rockwell of The New York Times called it an "honest, attractive album" and a "nice return to his Night Moves form."

== Track listing ==
All tracks are written by Bob Seger.

Side One
No.	Title	Length
1.	"The Horizontal Bop"	4:03
2.	"You'll Accomp'ny Me"	4:00
3.	"Her Strut"	3:51
4.	"No Man's Land"	3:43
5.	"Long Twin Silver Line"	4:18

Side Two
No.	Title	Length
1.	"Against the Wind"	5:34
2.	"Good for Me"	4:03
3.	"Betty Lou's Gettin' Out Tonight"	2:52
4.	"Fire Lake"	3:30
5.	"Shinin' Brightly"	4:30

The Silver Bullet Band plays on side one tracks 1–3 and on side two tracks 1 & 3.

The Muscle Shoals Rhythm Section plays on side one tracks 4 & 5 and on side two tracks 2, 4, & 5.

== Personnel ==
- Bob Seger – guitar, vocals, background vocals, guitar solos on "The Horizontal Bop" (intro and outro) and "Her Strut", outro guitar solo on "No Man's Land"

The Silver Bullet Band

- Drew Abbott – guitar, central guitar solo on "The Horizontal Bop"
- Chris Campbell – bass guitar
- Alto Reed – saxophone on "The Horizontal Bop", "Betty Lou's Gettin' Out Tonight" and "Shinin' Brightly"
- David Teegarden – drums, percussion

Muscle Shoals Rhythm Section

- Barry Beckett – piano on "No Man's Land", "Long Twin Silver Line", "Good for Me", "Fire Lake", "Shinin' Brightly"
- Pete Carr – guitar on "No Man's Land", "Long Twin Silver Line" (including solos), "Good for Me", "Fire Lake", "Shinin' Brightly"
- Roger Hawkins – drums, percussion on "No Man's Land", "Long Twin Silver Line", "Good for Me", "Fire Lake", "Shinin' Brightly"
- David Hood – bass guitar on "No Man's Land", "Long Twin Silver Line", "Good for Me", "Fire Lake", "Shinin' Brightly"
- Jimmy Johnson – guitar on "No Man's Land", "Long Twin Silver Line", "Good for Me", "Fire Lake", "Shinin' Brightly"
- Randy McCormick – organ on "No Man's Land", "Long Twin Silver Line", "Good for Me", "Fire Lake", "Shinin' Brightly"

Additional musicians

- Ginger Blake – backing vocals on "You'll Accomp'ny Me" "Good For Me" and "Shinin' Brightly"
- Sam Clayton – percussion on "You'll Accomp'ny Me"
- Laura Creamer – backing vocals on "You'll Accomp'ny Me" "Good For Me" and "Shinin' Brightly"
- Linda Dillard – backing vocals on "You'll Accomp'ny Me" "Good For Me" and "Shinin' Brightly"
- Glenn Frey – harmony vocals on "Fire Lake" and "Against the Wind"
- Paul Harris – piano on "Against the Wind" and "Betty Lou's Gettin' Out Tonight", organ on "Against the Wind"
- Don Henley – harmony vocals on "Fire Lake"
- Dr. John – keyboards on "The Horizontal Bop"
- Bill Payne – organ, synthesizer, piano on "You'll Accomp'ny Me"
- Doug Riley – synthesizer on "No Man's Land"
- Timothy B. Schmit – harmony vocals on "Fire Lake"

=== Production ===
- Punch Andrews – producer, mixer
- John Arrias – engineer, mixer
- Tom Bert – photography
- Roy Kohara – art direction
- Steve Melton – producer, engineer, mixer
- Muscle Shoals Rhythm Section – producer, mixer
- Bob Seger – producer, mixer
- Bill Szymczyk – producer, engineer, mixer
- Wally Traugott – mastering
- Punch Andrews - 1999 remastering
- Robert Vosgien – 2003 remastering
- Jim Warren – paintings

== Charts ==
=== Weekly charts ===
Chart (1980–81)	Peak position
Australian Albums (Kent Music Report)	6
Canada Top Albums/CDs (RPM)	1
Dutch Albums (Album Top 100)	17
German Albums (Offizielle Top 100)	17
New Zealand Albums (RMNZ)	3
Norwegian Albums (VG-lista)	38
Swedish Albums (Sverigetopplistan)	11
UK Albums (Official Charts)	26
US Billboard 200	1

=== Year-end charts ===
Chart (1980)	Position
Canada Top Albums/CDs (RPM)	3
German Albums (Offizielle Top 100)	54
New Zealand Albums (RMNZ)	44
US Billboard 200	6
Chart (1981)	Position
US Billboard 200	48

== Awards ==
Grammy Awards

Year	Winner	Category
1980	Bob Seger & the Silver Bullet Band	Best Rock Performance By A Duo Or Group With Vocal
1980	Roy Kohara	Best Recording Package

== Certifications ==
Region	Certification	Certified units/sales
Canada (Music Canada)	5× Platinum	500,000^{^}
United States (RIAA)	5× Platinum	5,000,000^{^}
^{^} Shipments figures based on certification alone.

== See also ==
- Muscle Shoals, Alabama
- Muscle Shoals Rhythm Section
- Muscle Shoals Sound Studios
