= Green Concorde =

Danish indie rock band

Green Concorde was a Danish indie rock band, founded in 2003. On 8 September 2009 the band members announced on their Myspace profile that they would no longer be playing together as Green Concorde.

== History ==
On the remainders of The Bella Rocca Band, four musically likeminded, yet personally diverse guys formed Green Concorde in October 2003. From their base in Nørrebro, an area of Danish Capitol Copenhagen with a lively multi-ethnic culture and a history of riots between squatters and police, the band started writing songs inspired by their surroundings.

Outside Denmark, Green Concorde has played venues in Germany, the Netherlands, France and Norway.

== Discography ==
=== 9-Song Split ===
In 2004 the band released a split-CD with the Dutch instrumentalist post-rock band We vs Death. On this album, released on Morningside Records (Denmark), Zabel Muziek (Netherlands) and Eglantine Records (France), appeared the following Green Concorde songs:

1. Ten Cities of Green Concorde
2. 2:26
3. This Time
4. Yellow Raincoats
5. Detroit
6. Two Red Chairs

=== Ten Cities ===
The band released their full-length debut in January 2007. The CD and LP was released on Bonnier Amigo Music (Denmark) and Pop-U-Loud (GAS), and contained eleven tracks:

1. This Time
2. The Anthem To Which We Fall
3. We Set Sail By The Way We Feel
4. Detroit
5. Rooster
6. Toxic Symphony
7. Fireside
8. Ten Cities Of Green Concorde
9. 2:26
10. Angel Food
11. Catch And Turn

=== Down The Corridor To The Exit Through The Gates Out Into Safety ===
The band's second full-length came out in March 2009 on CD and vinyl. The album was released on Target Records (Denmark) and Pop-U-Loud (GAS), and contained nine tracks:

1. Flowers Of Romance
2. Planet WWX (WWX may be a reference to World War 10)
3. After Love (Nothing Else Will Do)
4. Silvercoated Buildings
5. Silence And Glass
6. Neu
7. Arrows On Fire
8. Death

== Former members ==
- Peter Skaanning Opstrup (bass)
- Carsten Hebsgaard Nielsen (guitar)
- Morten Espersen Dam (vocals and guitar)
- Simon Lund-Jensen (drums)
