= Frankie Ballard =

American country singer, songwriter, and guitarist

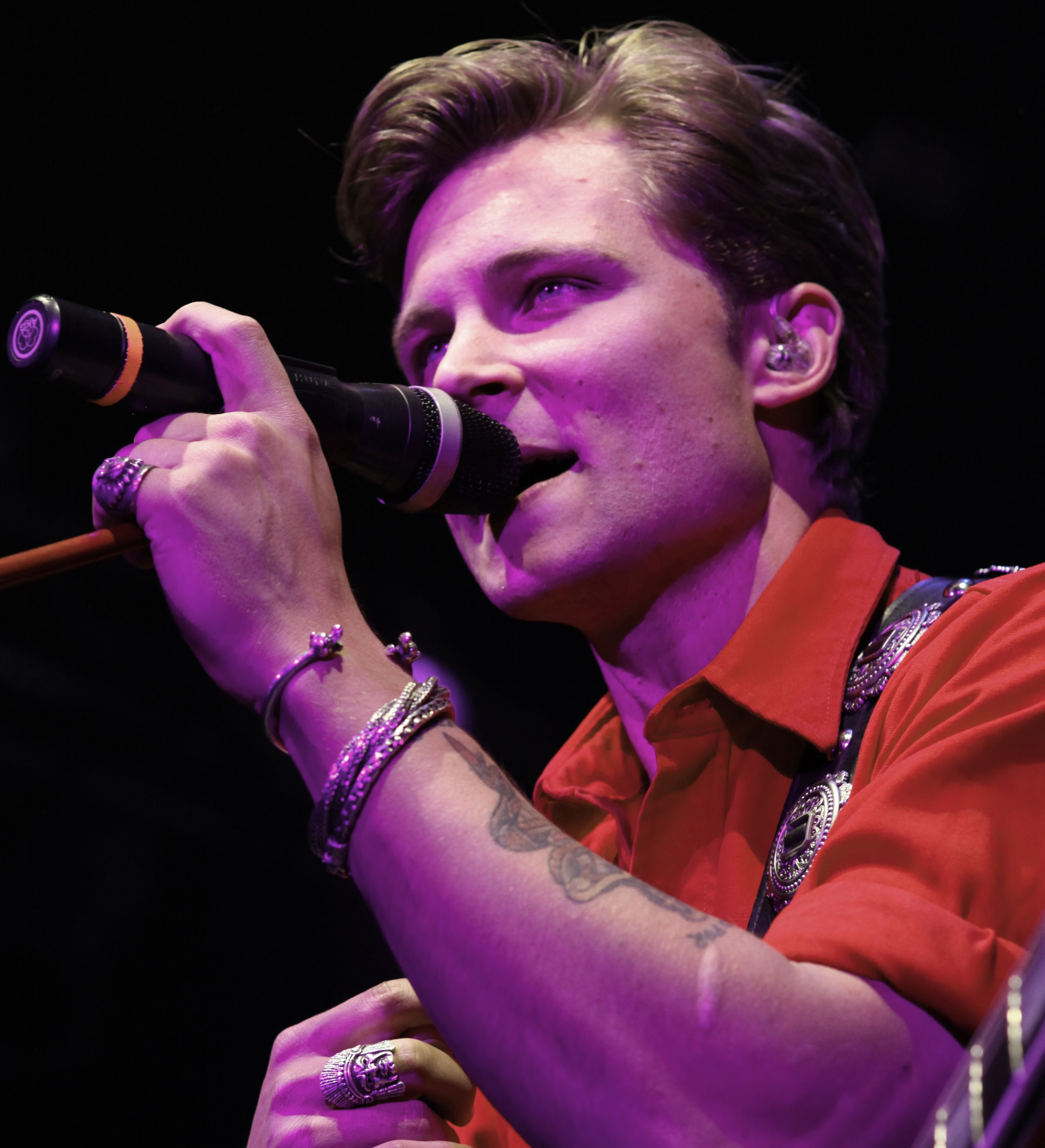
- Ballard performing at Highline Ballroom, New York, NY, April 24, 2014

Background information
- Born: Frank Robert Ballard IV; December 16, 1982 (age 43); Battle Creek, Michigan, U.S.
- Origin: Nashville, Tennessee
- Genres: Country
- Occupations: Singer-songwriter; guitarist
- Instruments: Vocals; guitar
- Years active: 2007–present
- Labels: Reprise Nashville; Warner Bros. Nashville

Frank Robert Ballard IV (born December 16, 1982) is an American country music singer-songwriter and guitarist. He has released two albums each for Reprise Records and Warner Bros. Records, and has charted eight singles on the Hot Country Songs charts.

== Personal life ==
Ballard played college baseball at Mott Community College. He then continued to pursue college baseball by playing in the NCAA with Western Michigan University.

On March 12, 2017, Ballard married his girlfriend, Christina Murphy, owner of Old Smokeys Boots, a Nashville-based shoe and accessory store. On November 7, 2019, the couple announced they were expecting their first child. Their daughter, Pepper Lynn, was born on February 8, 2020.

== Music career ==
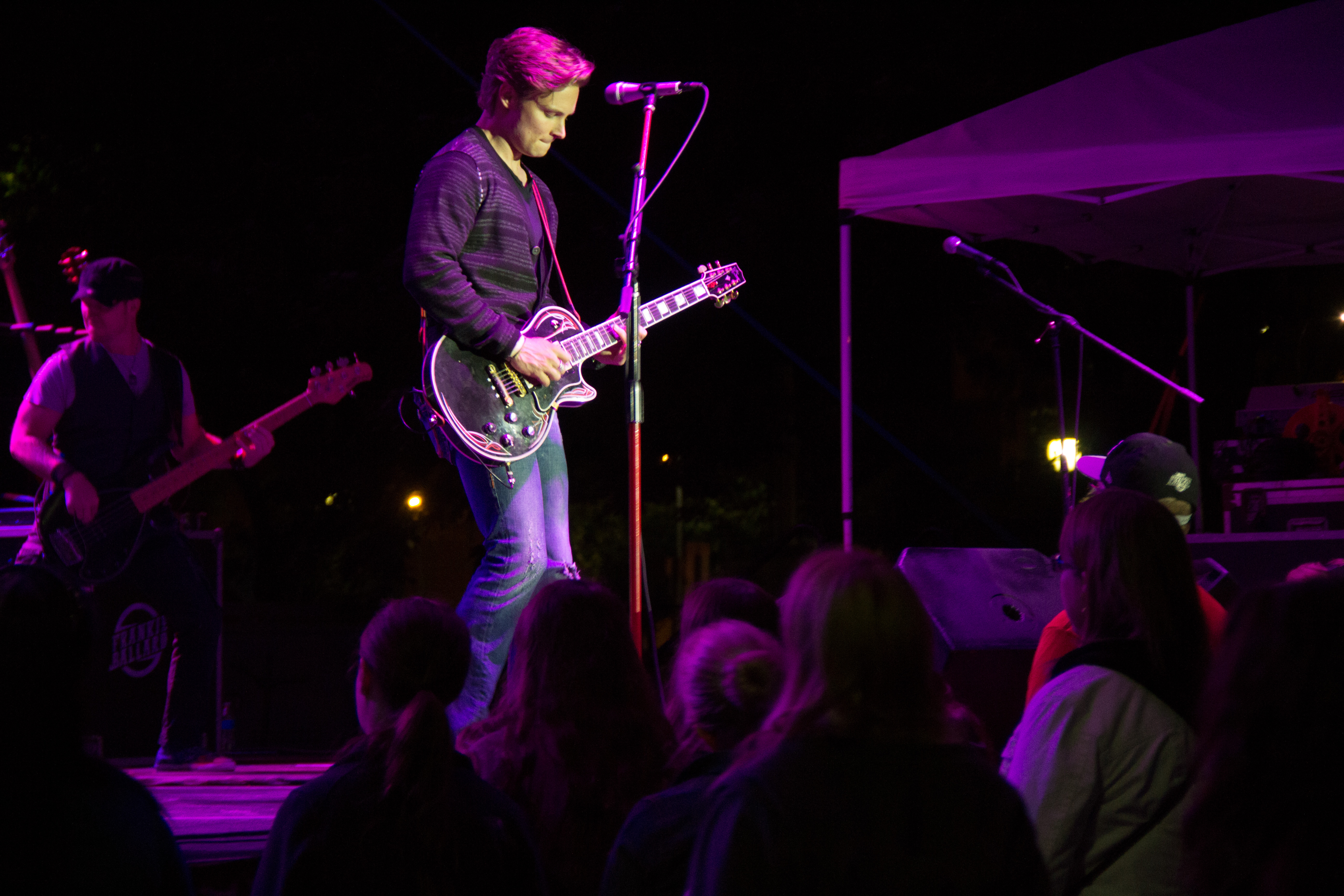
Ballard performing at Great River Days, Muscatine, Iowa, July 27, 2013

In the summer of 2008 he signed up for Kenny Chesney's Next Big Star competition. After winning the competition for Michigan in 2008, Ballard also opened shows for Chesney at Michigan venues.

He signed to Reprise Records Nashville in 2010 and released his debut single "Tell Me You Get Lonely." It received a four-star review from Kyle Ward of Roughstock, who praised Ballard's voice and called the song "an above average debut effort." The song debuted at Number 59 on the Hot Country Songs charts dated for the week ending June 12, 2010, and peaked at number 33 in early 2011.

On January 7, 2011, Ballard made his debut appearance at the Grand Ole Opry.

He released his second single, "A Buncha Girls", in early 2011. This song also made the top 40. Both of his singles are included on his self-titled debut album, released in May 2011.

Also in 2011, he opened for Lady Antebellum.

In 2013, Ballard moved to Warner Bros. Records and released his third single, "Helluva Life". This is the lead single to his second album, Sunshine & Whiskey. It became his first number 1 single in early 2014. Later in the year, the album's title track went to number 1. "Young & Crazy", the album's third single, also went to number 1.

The first single from Ballard's third album, "It All Started with a Beer", was released to country radio on November 16, 2015. The album, El Rio, was released on June 10, 2016. The album's second single, "Cigarette", released to country radio on August 8, 2016.

On November 22, 2024, Ballard released the EP Dirty Church Clothes, featuring the single of the same name.

=== Additional music contributions ===
Ballard co-wrote "I Came to Git Down" on Big & Rich's 2014 album Gravity.

=== Concert tours ===
Supporting

- Own the Night Tour with Lady Antebellum (2011)
- Anything Goes Tour with Florida Georgia Line (2015)
- Still the Same Concert Tour with Sugarland (2018)

== Discography ==
=== Studio albums ===
Title	Details	Peak chart positions			Sales
Title	Details	US Country	US	US Heat	Sales
Frankie Ballard	Release date: May 24, 2011; Label: Reprise; Formats: CD, digital download	33	—	6	US: 11,000
Sunshine & Whiskey	Release date: February 11, 2014; Label: Warner Bros.; Formats: CD, digital download	5	35	—	US: 105,000
El Rio	Release date: June 10, 2016; Label: Warner Bros.; Formats: CD, digital download	9	68	—	US: 13,300
"—" denotes releases that did not chart

=== Singles ===
Year	Single	Peak chart positions					Certifications	Sales	Album
Year	Single	US Country Songs	US Country Airplay	US	CAN Country	CAN	Certifications	Sales	Album
2010	"Tell Me You Get Lonely"	33		—	—	—			Frankie Ballard
2011	"A Buncha Girls"	27		—	—	—			Frankie Ballard
2013	"Helluva Life"	8	1	51	8	67	US: Gold	US: 516,000	Sunshine & Whiskey
2014	"Sunshine & Whiskey"	5	1	57	4	75	US: Platinum; CAN: Gold	US: 590,000	Sunshine & Whiskey
2015	"Young & Crazy"	8	1	55	3	68		US: 195,000	Sunshine & Whiskey
2015	"It All Started with a Beer"	22	15	—^{A}	50	—		US: 212,500	El Rio
2016	"Cigarette"	—	52	—	—	—			El Rio
2017	"You'll Accomp'ny Me"	—	57	—	—	—			El Rio
"—" denotes releases that did not chart

- ^{A}"It All Started with a Beer" did not enter the Hot 100, but peaked at number 2 on Bubbling Under Hot 100 Singles.

=== Music videos ===
Year	Title	Director
2010	"Tell Me You Get Lonely"	Marcel Chagnon
2011	"A Buncha Girls"	Jim Wright
2013	"Helluva Life"	Mason Dixon
2014	"Sunshine & Whiskey"	Jack Guy
2015	"Young & Crazy"	Glen Rose
2016	"It All Started with a Beer"	Marcel Chagnon
2016	"El Camino"	
2016	"Cigarette"	Sam Siske
2016	"Sweet Time"	
2016	"Good as Gold"	
