= Fire Lake =

Single by Bob Seger & The Silver Bullet Band

from the album Against the Wind
- B-side: "Long Twin Silver Line"
- Released: January 1980
- Studio: Muscle Shoals (Sheffield)
- Genre: Heartland rock
- Length: 3:30
- Label: Capitol
- Songwriter: Bob Seger
- Producers: Bob Seger and the Muscle Shoals Rhythm Section

Bob Seger & The Silver Bullet Band singles chronology
"Old Time Rock and Roll" (1979)	"Fire Lake" (1980)	"Against the Wind" (1980)

"Fire Lake" is a song written and recorded by the American musical artist Bob Seger, from the 1980 album Against the Wind. The single reached number 6 on the Billboard Hot 100. A live version of the song appeared on the album Nine Tonight, released in 1981.

== Background and writing ==
Seger and colleagues decided to make "Fire Lake" the first single from Against the Wind because it was "totally and unequivocally unlike anything I'd ever done before."

== Reception ==
Music critic Maury Dean described the song as an "ominous ballad" about "4th of July fireworks". Dean praised the song's intensity, Seger's vocal, and the "nifty" minor chords. Dean speculated that the title may not be entirely figurative, as there may be a hidden reference to a midwestern body of water which caught fire, the Cuyahoga River in Ohio. Billboard described "Fire Lake" as an "excellent song [that] is paced by acoustic guitar which lends a folk flavor" and the lyrics as describing "the subversion of small-town life." Cash Box said it has "full-bodied harmonies and an easy, country-tinged melody" and praised the production. Record World called it "Dynamite!" Classic Rock History critic Janey Roberts rated it as Seger's 14th best song.

== Production ==
Three of the Eagles provided the backing vocals for this track: Glenn Frey, Don Henley and Timothy B. Schmit. Seger's recording engineer David Cole refers to the song on his website when he talks of his history with Seger: "I was there when the Eagles sang 'Who wants to go to Fire Lake?' and many other great moments during the Stranger in Town album".

== Personnel ==
Credits are adapted from the liner notes of Seger's 2003 Greatest Hits 2 compilation.

- Bob Seger – lead vocals

Muscle Shoals Rhythm Section

- Barry Beckett – piano
- Pete Carr – lead guitar, acoustic guitar
- Roger Hawkins – drums, percussion
- David Hood – bass
- Jimmy Johnson – rhythm guitar
- Randy McCormick – organ

Additional musicians

- Glenn Frey – harmony vocals
- Don Henley – harmony vocals
- Timothy B. Schmit – harmony vocals

== Chart performance ==
=== Weekly charts ===
Chart (1980)	Peak position
Australian Kent Music Report	57
Belgian VRT Top 30	21
Canada Top Singles (RPM)	3
Canada Adult Contemporary (RPM)	4
Dutch Singles Chart	26
New Zealand Singles Chart	18
US Billboard Hot 100	6
US Adult Contemporary (Billboard)	31

=== Year-end charts ===
Chart (1980)	Rank
Canada RPM Top 100	22
US Top Pop Singles (Billboard)	67
