= Marshall Altman =

American producer and songwriter

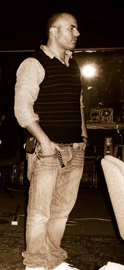
- Marshall Altman

Background information
- Born: Marshall Noah Altman
- Genres: Mainstream pop, Singer/songwriter, Country, Indie Folk, Indie Pop, Modern Blues
- Occupations: Record producer Writer; A&R
- Years active: 1995 - present
- Website: http://marshallaltman.com/

Marshall Noah Altman is a Nashville-based A&R for Nettwerk Music Group, and a record producer and songwriter who owns the Galt Line studio in Nashville, Tennessee. He was formerly an A&R person for such labels as Capitol Records, Hollywood Records and Columbia Records, as well as the former frontman for the alternative band Farmer. As a record producer, he has worked for a variety of artists, including Matt Nathanson, Trevor Hall, Marc Broussard, Brooke Fraser, Kate Voegele, Matt Duke, Eric Paslay, Frankie Ballard, and William Fitzsimmons.

The week of February 3, 2014 Marshall had his first #1 charting production with Eric Paslay's Friday Night. The same week, Frankie Ballard's, Helluva Life, also produced by Marshall charted in the Top 10 at #8, eventually climbing to #1, along with 2 other releases from the Sunshine and Whiskey album.

== Personal life ==
Altman was born in New York City and raised in Pomona, a city in Rockland County, New York. He moved to the Los Angeles, California area for high school and stayed in the area until the summer of 2010, when he moved his studio and family to Nashville.

== Early career, A&R work ==
After graduating high school in Huntington Beach, California, Altman attended college at UC Santa Barbara, for a major in business and a minor in music. He left UC Santa Barbara before finishing his degree to attend the Grove School of Music in Los Angeles. After finishing at Grove, he began work as a music programmer in Los Angeles. Altman opened his first recording studio in the mid 90's, and while running the studio he did work writing software, which then lead to software work with Capitol/EMI. He quit his studio and left for a job at Capitol, working in sales and eventually moving to the A&R department as a scout.

During this time he formed a band called Farmer in 1995 that was signed by Aware Records and later released an eponymous album in 1997. While on the road touring with Farmer he served as an A&R scout for Capitol, while also listening to demo submissions. One of those submissions was for the artist Citizen Cope (Clarence Greenwood), which he helped develop and was able to get signed a record deal to Capitol. Following the signing, Altman was awarded with an executive A&R job. He quit his band and focused on A&R, keeping the career for ten years. During this time he moved from Capitol Records, to Hollywood Records and to finally Columbia Records where he principally A&R'd Katy Perry & OneRepublic.

== Record Producer ==
During his last years as an A&R executive at Columbia, he also began actively working as a record producer. Some of his early work includes producing Marc Broussard's first two albums, Momentary Setback and Carencro, as well as an album for the band Jupiter Sunrise. He eventually left Columbia to pursue being a full-time record producer in 2005, starting the Galt Line Music label and a studio in Burbank, California. During the production of Todd Carey's album Watching Waiting he was introduced to engineer Eric Robinson by Carey, and Altman and Robinson would continue a working partnership at the Galt Line for years afterward. At the Galt Line he would go on to produce for a variety of artists, achieving commercial success with albums such as Kate Voegele's Don't Look Away and Matt Nathanson's Some Mad Hope. His other producer credits include albums for: Natasha Bedingfield, Gabe Dixon, Walker Hayes, Rosi Golan, Adema, Matt Wertz, Trevor Hall, Caitlin Crosby, Kimberly Caldwell, and Tom Morello and others.

Marshall founded the label Galt Line Music in 2007, and its first release, the eponymous album by Curtis Peoples, came out in August 2008.

In 2010, Altman had a top 10 hit in the UK of his co-write "Parachute" with Ingrid Michaelson for British pop singer Cheryl Cole's debut solo album 3 Words which went #1 in the UK, Ireland, Australia and New Zealand. Marshall also co-wrote Jessie James' 2011 single "When You Say My Name."

Altman produced Frankie Ballard's 2014 album Sunshine & Whiskey, and co-produced Eric Paslay's 2014 debut album Eric Paslay. He was sole producer on Ballard's following album, El Río, which was released on June 10, 2016.
