= CINE =

Non-profit organization

- Council On International Non-theatrical Events Inc
- CINE's Official Logo
- Formation: 1957
- Dissolved: 2018; 8 years ago
- Type: 501(c)(3) non-profit organization
- Purpose: CINE builds and supports a community of professional, emerging and student film, television and digital content creators through the CINE Golden Eagle Awards, the CINE Connects alumni network, the Marvin Hamlisch Film Scoring Contest, and related skill-building programming.
- Location: Washington, D.C.
- Website: www.cine.org at the Wayback Machine (archived 2018-06-01)

CINE (Council on International Nontheatrical Events) was a non-profit film organization based in Washington, D.C. Founded in 1957 with the mission of selecting American films for international film festivals, CINE's focus evolved to supporting emerging and established producers of film, TV and digital media from all around the world through film competitions, educational panels, screenings and networking opportunities. After 61 years, CINE ceased operations in 2018.

== History ==
CINE's original name, the Committee on International Non-Theatrical Events, was chosen to create the acronym CINE, after which it was then changed to Council on International Non-Theatrical Events. Over time the organization came to refer to itself primarily as CINE.

CINE's original purpose was to provide European film festival directors with representative American informational films to exhibit. For decades, the CINE Golden Eagle Competition was a way for non-theatrical American films to gain access to festivals and even the Academy Awards before they stopped accepting entries from the majority of festivals and competitions.

CINE was once partially funded by the now defunct United States Information Agency. This funding ceased in the late 1990s, not long before the abolishment of the agency.

In the fall of 2014 CINE made some major changes to their organization, which included creating one entry cycle per year for each award (Professional, Independent and Student), switching to a more traditional nominee structure in which only one production per category is named the winner, and transitioning the entire process online. However, unlike many major awards organizations, CINE's categories were based on original content and excellent storytelling, not distribution platform, to reflect the constantly changing industry.

== Awards ==
CINE presents two types of awards: competitive and honorary. Competitive awards include the Golden Eagle Award (instituted in 1962), Special Jury Award, Masters Series, and Award of Excellence. Honorary awards included the Leadership Award, Trailblazer Award, Lifetime Achievement Award, and Legends Award. Separate from the Golden Eagle Awards, CINE also held a Film Scoring Competition, which was launched in 2013. In 2014, the competition was renamed the Marvin Hamlisch Film Contest for Emerging Composers in honor of the legendary composer. In 2019, after CINE had shut down, the Marvin Hamlisch estate launched the Marvin Hamlisch International Music Awards non-profit to continue holding composition competitions under the composer's name, expanding the scope of the contests to include theater, classical and song categories in multiple genres.

CINE utilizes a jury system to select winners. CINE also presents individuals with special honors. Many important filmmakers have received the Golden Eagle Award early in their career, such as Steven Spielberg for his first film Amblin' and Academy Award winning/nominated entries from Mel Brooks (The Critic) and Ken Burns (Brooklyn Bridge).

== Selected CINE Golden Eagle winners ==
The CINE Golden Eagle Award Trophy

The following people in the film and television industry are among those who have received a CINE Golden Eagle:

=== 1960s ===
- Mel Brooks (The Critic, 1963)
- Jim Henson (Time Piece, 1967)
- George Ancona (Reflections: the imagery of Paul Hultberg enamelist, 1967)
- Mike Nichols (Bach to Bach, 1968)
- Steven Spielberg (Amblin', 1969)

=== 1970s ===
- James R. Rokos (The Resurrection of Broncho Billy, 1971)
- Darrell Beschen (Running on Empty, 1978)
- Martha Coolidge (Old-Fashioned Woman, 1974)
- Robert Drew (Who's Out There?, 1975)
- Dick Ebersol (The Ancient Games, 1973)
- Taylor Hackford (Bukowski, 1974 and Teenage Father, 1979)
- Ron Howard (Deed of Daring-Do, 1972)
- John Korty (The Music School, 1974)
- Albert Magnoli (Jazz, 1979)
- Martin Scorsese (Italianamerican, 1975)
- Ron Underwood (The New Freedom, 1973)
- Robert Zemeckis (The Lift, 1972 and A Field of Honor, 1973)

=== 1980s ===
- Allan Albert (Between the Lines, 1984; 100 Years of Liberty, 1985; All About the Statue of Liberty, 1986; Something Special Happened in South Bend…, 1988)
- Emile Ardolino (The Dance and the Railroad, 1982; He Makes Me Feel Like Dancin', 1983; Choreography by Jerome Robbins with the New York City Ballet, 1986; In Memory of ..., 1987)
- Leonard L. Bailey (Technique of Mitral Valve Replacement in Early Infancy, 1983)
- Malcolm Barbour and John Langley, (Cocaine Blues - The Myth and Reality of Cocaine, 1983)
- Saul Bass and Elaine Bass (Quest, 1983)
- Skip Battaglia (Boccioni's Bike, 1982)
- Nancy Beiman (Your Feet's Too Big, 1984)
- Robert Bilheimer (All By Myself, The Parapodium: An Alternative for the Paraplegic Child, 1983; The Cry of Reason, 1988)
- Lance Bird (America, Lost and Found, 1980)
- Noel Black (The Electric Grandmother, 1982)
- Les Blank (Garlic is as Good as Ten Mothers and Burden of Dreams, 1983; In Heaven There Is No Beer?, 1984; Cigarette Blues, 1986; Ziveli! Medicine for the Heart and Gap-Toothed Women, 1988)
- Michael Blackwood (We Were German Jews, 1982; A Composer's Notes: Philip Glass and the Making of an Opera, 1986)
- Lee R. Bobker (American Picture Palaces, 1983; To Catch a Cloud: A Thoughtful Look at Acid Rain, 1983; I, Leonardo, 1983; The War Which Never Happened, 1984; The Ultimate Challenge, 1984; The Movie Palaces, 1986; President, 1987; Headache, The Ancient Enemy, 1988; How Do You Thank Anyone For A Heart?, 1989)
- Alan Bridges (Pudd'nhead Wilson, 1984, Displaced Person, 1985)
- Kirk Browning (Kennedy Center Tonight - Stravinsky's Firebird by the Dance Theatre of Harlem, 1982; Christmas with the Mormon Tabernacle Choir & Shirley Verrett, 1987)
- Ken Burns (Brooklyn Bridge, 1981; The Shakers: Hands to Work, Hearts to God, 1984; Huey Long and The Statue of Liberty, 1985; Thomas Hart Benton, 1988; The Congress, 1989)
- Jeff Burr (Divided We Fall, 1984)
- Philip Burton Jr. (Portrait of America/Iowa, 1984; Timerman: The News From Argentina, 1984; Ducks Under Siege, 1987; The Return: A Jewish Renewal, 1988)
- Iris Cantor (Rodin and The Gates of Hell, 1982)
- Lee Caplin and Ruth Caplin (Living American Theatre Dance, 1983)
- Robert Carmichael and Greg Lowe (First Ascent, 1983)
- Doug Chiang (Mental Block, 1984)
- Joyce Chopra (Music Lessons, 1982)
- James Clavell (The Children's Story, 1983)
- John David Coles (Hellfire, 1983)
- Jacques Cousteau (River of the Future, The New El Dorado: Invaders & Exiles, and Journey to a Thousand Rivers, 1984; Cousteau/Mississippi and Snowstorm in the Jungle, 1985; Riders of the Wind and Haiti: Waters of Sorrow, 1986; Marquesas Islands: Mountains From the Sea and Cuba: Waters of Destiny, 1987)
- Jean-Michel Cousteau (River of the Future, The New El Dorado: Invaders & Exiles, and Journey to a Thousand Rivers, 1984; Snowstorm in the Jungle, 1985; Riders of the Wind and Haiti: Waters of Sorrow, 1986; Cape Horn: Waters of the Wind and Legacy of Cortez, 1987)
- Bill Couturié (Vietnam Requiem, 1983; Dear America: Letters Home from Vietnam, 1988)
- Tom Davenport (The Making of "The Frog King", 1982; Bearskin, 1983; The Goose Girl, 1985, Jack & The Dentist's Daughter, 1985, A Singing Stream, 1987; Soldier Jack; 1988)
- Carson Davidson (Proctosigmoidoscopy in the Physician's Office, 1984; 40,000 Acres, With View, 1985; The Light Bulb Re-Invented, 1987)
- David Davidson (Long Gone Charlie, 1984; Cissy Houston - Sweet Inspiration, 1988)
- Gene Deitch (The Hat, 1982; Why Mosquitoes Buzz in People's Ears, 1984; In the Night Kitchen, 1987; Where the Wild Things Are, 1989)
- Johanna Demetrakas (The Three Worlds of Bali, 1982)
- Loni Ding (Nisei Soldier, 1984; The Color of Honor, 1988)
- Tony De Nonno (Moira: A Vision of Blindness, 1982; One Generation Is Not Enough, 1982; Itzhak Perlman: In My Case Music, 1983)
- Frank Q. Dobbs (Hooked on Houston, 1982; Lions, Parakeets and Other Prisoners, 1984
- Arthur Dong (Sewing Woman, 1982)
- Robert L. Drew (Herself, Indira Gandhi, 1982; Being with John F. Kennedy, 1984; Marshall High Fights Back, 1985; For Auction: An American Hero, 1986)
- Norman Dyhrenfurth (Tibetan Death Rites, 1983)
- Mar Elepaño (Lion Dance, 1982; Sleep Sounds, 1983)
- Jon H. Else (Palace of Delights, 1982)
- Boyd Estus (The Navigators, 1983)
- Dorothy Fadiman (Peace: A Conscious Choice, 1982)
- Linda Feferman (Mother May I?, 1983)
- Connie Field (The Life and Times of Rosie the Riveter, 1980)
- Roy Frumkes (Burt's Bikers, 1982)
- Elda Hartley (Going With the Flow, 1983; Green Winter, 1986)
- Herk Harvey (Shake Hands with Danger, 1980; Signals: Read 'em or Weep!, 1982; The Team of Your Life, 1982; Life Force, 1983; Bidding Your Money Hello, 1983; Telemarketing I - Customer Services: A Backup Sales Force, 1983; Korea: Window to the Orient, 1983; Korea: Ancient Culture, Modern Spirit, 1986)
- Bruce Seth Green (Shades of Gray, 1983)
- Charles Guggenheim (Yorktown, 1984; The Making of Liberty, 1987; The Johnstown Flood, 1989)
- J. Michael Hagopian (Strangers in a Promised Land, 1984)
- Anthony Herrera (Mississippi Delta Blues, 1984)
- Victoria Hochberg (Tell Them I'm a Mermaid, 1984)
- Lawrence Hott (The Garden of Eden, 1984; The Adirondacks: The Life and Times of an American Wilderness, 1987; Sentimental Women Need Not Apply: A History of the American Nurse, 1988)
- Kathleen "Spud" Houston (Children of Wax: A Folktale from Matabeleland, Zimbabwe, 1988)
- Linda Moulton Howe (Borrowed Faces, 1982)
- Peter H. Hunt (The Mysterious Stranger, 1983, Adventures of Huckleberry Finn, 1986)
- Konstantin Kalser (For Years to Come, 1983)
- Theo Kamecke (The Future Below, 1983; The Microwave Question, 1983; Teterboro: Memories of an Airport, 1986)
- William Kronick (To the Ends of the Earth, 1983)
- Ken Kwapis (For Heaven's Sake, 1983)
- Sidney D. Kirkpatrick (My Father the President, 1982)
- Richard LaBrie (Swingline, 1983)
- Mary Lance (Artists at Work: A Film on the New Deal Art Projects, 1982)
- Saul Landau (Report from Beirut, 1983)
- Larry Lansburgh (Alaska: The Yup'ik Indians, 1986)
- John Lasseter (Luxo Jr., 1987)
- Robin Lehman (Metropolitan Cats, 1983)
- Arnold Leibovit (The Fantasy Film Worlds of George Pal, 1986)
- Barry Levinson (Displaced Persons, 1985)
- James Lipscomb (Love Those Trains, 1984)
- James Mangold (Future View, 1982)
- Sue Marx (Jim Pallas: Electronic Sculptor, 1982; Young at Heart, 1987; Art in the Stations: Detroit People Mover, 1989; Encore on Woodward: Detroit's Fox Theatre, 1989)
- Kevin McCarey (Portrait of America: Puerto Rico, 1983; Portrait of America: Oregon, 1984; Trumpet of Conscience, 1986; Larry King's Night of Soviet Television, 1989)
- Jonas McCord (Vietnam Requiem, 1983)
- Christopher McLeod (The Four Corners: A National Sacrifice Area?, 1983; Downwind/Downstream, 1988)
- Kevin Meyer (Divided We Fall, 1984)
- Warren Miller (Have Windsurfer, Will Travel, 1982; Ballet of Competition, 1983; Rock N Roll 250, 1986)
- Hugh Morton (Winning at Hang Gliding, 1982; Richard Evans Younger, Wildlife Artist - The Black Bear, 1985; Hang Gliding Around the World, 1985; Richard Evans Younger, Wildlife Artist: Alaska Eagles & Bears, 1989)
- Mira Nair (So Far From India, 1983)
- Tom Neff (Daydreamer, 1982 and Red Grooms: Sunflower in a Hothouse, 1986)
- Robert Nixon (Whale Shark, 1984; Pygmy, 1984; If I Can Do This…I Can Do Anything, 1985; Elephant Diary, 1989)
- Lester Novros (IRAS: Infrared Astronomical Satellite, 1983)
- Brian O'Doherty (Hopper's Silence, 1982)
- Steven Okazaki (Unfinished Business, 1985)
- James Orr (Preserving a Moment in Time, 1983)
- Marty Pasetta (Let Poland be Poland, 1982)
- Gordon Parks (Solomon Northup's Odyssey, 1985)
- Jimmy Picker (Sundae in New York, 1984)
- Joanna Priestley (Voices, 1985)
- Bill Plympton (Boomtown, 1985)
- Arthur Rankin Jr. and Jules Bass (The Life and Adventures of Santa Claus, 1986)
- Sheldon Renan (I Am Joe's Eye, 1984; AIDS: What Everyone Needs to Know, 1986; Trauma Emergency, 1989)
- Rick Reinert (Winnie the Pooh and a Day for Eeyore, 1984)
- John Robbins (Conquering Asthma and Allergies: We Can, We Will, We Must, 1984; Soongoora and Simba, 1985)
- Robert Rodat (The High Lonesome Sound, 1984)
- Bob Rogers (Aerotest, 1982; Ballet Robotique, 1982; Torture Test, 1983; The Lean Machine, 1983; The Car of Your Dreams, 1984; Rainbow War, 1986; Classic Disney, 1989)
- Fred Rogers (Let's Talk About Going to the Doctor, 1986)
- Nina Rosenblum and Daniel Allentuck (America and Lewis Hine, 1985)
- Ralph Rosenblum (Summer Solstice, 1983)
- Irwin Rosten (The Thames, 1982)
- Chris Ruppenthal (Violent Death - A Musical, 1984)
- Gary Rydstrom (The Committee, 1984)
- Luciano Salce (The Innocents Abroad, 1983)
- Kristine Samuelson (2 A.M. Feeding, 1984)
- Jack Santino and Paul Wagner (Miles of Smiles, Years of Struggle, 1983)
- Damon Santostefano (Greenpoint: Turning the Tide, 1983)
- Irving Saraf (Participative Management: We Learn From the Japanese, 1984; Going International Part II: Managing Overseas Assignment; 1984, Going International: Living in the USA, 1986)
- Joseph Sargent (Choices of the Heart, 1984)
- Nancy Savoca (Bad Timing, 1984)
- Michael Scott (Not the Same Old Story, 1983 Going Straight, 1983; One Man's Fight for Life, 1984)
- Susan Shadburne, A Family Affair, 1982)
- Roger Sherman, (The Garden of Eden, 1984)
- Sigurjón Sighvatsson (The Story of L. Sharkey, 1982)
- Tony Silver (Style Wars, 1984)
- David Silverman (The Strange Case of Mr. Donnybrook's Boredom, 1982)
- Michael Slovis (Love in Vain, 1984)
- Michael Sporn (Morris's Disappearing Bag, 1983; Doctor De Soto, 1984; The Amazing Bone, 1985; The Mysterious Tadpole, 1987; Abel's Island, 1988)
- Paul Steinbroner and William Edgar Cohen (Uppers, Downers, All Arounders, 1984; The Haight-Ashbury Cocaine Film, 1986; Opium to Heroin, 1989)
- George Stevens Jr. (George Stevens: A Filmmaker's Journey, 1984)
- Jack Stokes (Castle, 1984)
- Theodore Strauss (Return to Everest, 1984)
- David Sutherland (Paul Cadmus: Enfant Terrible at 80, 1984; Jack Levine: Feast of Pure Reason, 1986; Halftime, 1988)
- Michael Tuchner (Adam, 1984)
- Ron Underwood (A Case of Working Smarter, Not Harder, 1982; Closing the Sale, 1983; Selling: The Power of Confidence, 1983; Overcoming Objections, 1984; Living With Computers, 1984; Motivation: The Classic Concepts, 1985; The Meeting Robbers, 1986; The Mouse and the Motorcycle, 1987; Runaway Ralph, 1988; Chuckie, 1988)
- Bert Van Bork (The Rock Cycle, 1982, Ocean Dynamics: The Work of the Sea, 1982; Photosynthesis (Third Edition), 1982; Rivers: The Work of Running Water, 1982; Earthquakes: Exploring Earth's Restless Crust, 1983; Living Things In a Drop of Water, 1985; Flood Forecasting, 1986; Geologic Time, 1986; Plankton and the Open Sea (2nd Edition), 1986; Beginning of the Food Chain: Plankton, 1987; Evolution of Landscapes, 1987; Life: How Do We Define It?, 1987; What Is a Mammal?, 1987; Viruses: What They Are and How They Work, 1988)
- Will Vinton (The Diary of Adam and Eve, 1982; The Great Cognito, 1983; Vanz Kant Danz, 1986; Signed, Sealed, Delivered, 1989)
- Judith Wechsler (Edouard Manet: Painter of Modern Life, 1984; The Artist and the Nude, 1985; The Arrested Moment, 1988; Portraits, 1989)
- Sy Wexler (Hearts and Arteries in Trouble, 1983; Fetal Evaluation, 1983; Infection Control in Surgical Patients, 1983; Surgery of Male Genital Lymphedema, 1983; Intraocular Lens: Small Miracle of Sight, 1984; Radioisotopes in the Diagnosis of Cancer - Second Edition, 1984; High Blood Pressure, 1984; Hope Is Not a Method, 1984; Dorsal Lumbotomy Revisited, 1985; Surgical Reconstruction of Cloacal Exstrophy, 1985; Vasectomy By Excision and Ligation, 1986; Diabetes in Pregnancy, 1987)
- John David Wilson (Gotta Serve Somebody, 1983)
- Chuck Workman (The Director and the Image, 1984; The Best Show in Town, 1987; Words, 1989)
- Dick Young (Storms Bring Out the Eagles, 1982; Buffalo Bill and the Wild West, 1982; The Observatories, 1982; Sanctuary: An African Epic, 1982; Progress Not Promises, 1983; Tech Island, 1983; Never Too Old, 1984; Cocaine: Beyond the Looking Glass, 1984; To Be the Best: The Men and Women of Chrysler, 1985; Writing to Read, 1985; Being Young, 1985; Diabetes: The Journey and the Dream, 1985; Josh, 1985; Courage to Care, 1985; Dark Secrets, Bright Victory: One Woman's Recovery From Bulimia, 1986; Gotong Royong, 1986; Adult Literacy, 1987; Going For It, 1987; The Carrier Battle Group, 1987; Crack, 1987; The New Engineers, 1987; N.O.P.D, 1988; Genesis: Bridge Into the Future, 1988; New Sweden: An American Portrait, 1988; I'm A Person Too, 1988; If Every Person Could Read, 1989; The Gift of Hope, 1989)
- Roger Young (Bitter Harvest, 1982)
- Charlotte Zwerin (De Kooning on De Kooning, 1982; Arshile Gorky, 1983)
- Edward Zwick and Marshall Herskovitz (Special Bulletin, 1984)

=== 1990s ===
- Jon Alpert (Rape: Cries From the Heartland, 1991; Lock Up: The Prisoners of Rikers Island and Secret Cities, 1994; Snakeheads: The Chinese Mafia and the New Slave Trade, 1995, A Cinderella Season: The Lady Vols Fight Back, 1998, Life of Crime 2, 1999)
- Robert Altman (The Real McTeague, 1994)
- Paul Atkins (Hawaii: Strangers In Paradise, 1992; Great White Shark, 1995; Dolphins: The Wild Side, 1999)
- Orlando Bagwell (Malcolm X: Make It Plain, 1994; Frederick Douglass: When the Lion Wrote History, 1995)
- Jenny Barraclough (Aegean: Legacy of Atlantic and Greece: A Moment of Excellence, 1995)
- Peter Bergen (Crime Stories, 1992; The Smell of Money, 1993, Terror Nation? U.S. Creation?, 1994; CNN Presents…Kingdom of Cocaine, 1995)
- Harrod Blank (Wild Wheels, 1992)
- Les Blank (J'Ai Ete Au Bal (I Went To The Dance): The Cajun & Zydeco Music of Louisiana, Marc & Ann, and Yum, Yum, Yum! A Taste of the Cajun and Creole Cooking of Louisiana 1991; Sworn to the Drum: A Tribute to Francisco Aguabella, 1995)
- Rose Bond (Mallacht Macha (Macha's Curse), 1990; Deirdre's Choice, 1995)
- Nick Broomfield (Tracking Down Maggie, 1995)
- Ken Burns (The Civil War, 1990; Baseball, 1994)
- Ric Burns (Coney Island, 1991; The Donner Party, 1993; The Way West, 1995)
- Steven Cantor and Peter Spirer (Blood Ties: The Life and Work of Sally Mann, 1995)
- Lisa R. Cohen (Unbroken Chain: ABC News PrimeTime Live, 1995)
- Gene Deitch (The Emperor's New Clothes, 1991; The Pigs' Wedding, 1991; Sylvester and the Magic Pebble, 1993)
- Nancy Dine (Jim Dine: A Self-Portrait on the Walls, 1995)
- Martin Doblmeier (Through the Eyes of the Poor, 1990; I Am There, 1992; Creativity: Touching the Divine, 1995; The Carver Promise, 1996; Bernardin, 1998)
- Pete Docter (Palm Springs, 1991)
- Jerrilynn Dodds (An Imaginary East, 1995)
- William Greaves (Ida B. Wells: A Passion For Justice, 1991)
- David Grubin (Smithsonian World: Zoo, 1990; LBJ, 1992; Degenerate Art, 1993; FDR, 1995; Truman, 1998)
- Alex Hakobian (There's Only One Way to Settle This Argument, 1991; Bite of Apathy, 1992; Walking in Darkness, 1994; Spoiled Little Brat, 1999)
- Jack Haley Jr. (100 Years of the Hollywood Western, 1995)
- Judith Dwan Hallet (National Geographic Explorer: The Life and Legend of Jane Goodall, 1990; Audubon: Battle for the Great Plains, 1992; Lords of the Garden, 1995, American Buffalo: Spirit of a Nation, 1999)
- Faith Hubley (Upside Down, 1991; Seers and Clowns, 1994)
- Tommy Lee Jones (The Good Old Boys, 1995)
- Andrea Kalin (The Real Scoop About Diet and Exercise and The Wonder of Israel, 1995)
- Barbara Koppel (American Dream, 1990; A Century of Women: Work and Family, 1995)
- Candy Kugel and Vincent Cafarelli (Snowie and the Seven Dorps, 1990; Fast Food Matador, 1991; We Love It!, 1993; The Ballad of Archie Foley - He Played It By Ear!, 1995; Talking About Sex: A Guide For Families, 1996; Knit Wits, 1998)
- Mary Lance (Diego Rivera: I Paint What I See, 1990)
- John Lasseter (Knick Knack, 1990)
- Spike Lee (4 Little Girls, 1998)
- Robin Lehman (The Young Person's Guide to the Orchestra, 1990; Cats & Dogs (Dogs), 1995)
- Jane Lubchenco (Diversity of Life, 1994)
- Sylvia Morales (A Century of Women: Work and Family, 1995)
- James Myer (The American Field Trip: Exploring Broadcast Television, 1995)
- Robert A. Nakamura (Moving Memories and Something Strong Within, 1995)
- Vincent Paterson (In Search of Dr. Seuss, 1995)
- Gordon Peterson (Journey to Normandy: 50 Years Later, 1995)
- Frank Pierson (Citizen Cohn, 1993; Lakota Woman: Siege at Wounded Knee, 1995; Truman, 1996)
- Bill Plympton (25 Ways to Quit Smoking, 1990)
- Rick Reinert (The Bollo Caper, 1990)
- Bill Richmond (Seven Deadly Sins, 1994; The History of Rock 'n' Roll: The 70's - Have A Nice Decade, 1995; Sex in the '90s VI: What He Wants, 1996)
- Robert Richter (Can Tropical Rainforests Be Saved?, 1993; School of Assassins, 1999)
- Bob Rogers (Flower Planet, 1990; World Song, 1992; On Human Destiny and To Be an Astronaut, 1995)
- Gaylen Ross (Dealers Among Dealers, 1995)
- Oren Rudavsky (Picture Perfect: ABC News PrimeTime Live, 1995)
- Thomas Schlamme (Kingfish: A Story of Huey P. Long, 1995)
- Lewis Schoenbrun (The Golem, 1995)
- Allison Silberberg (Poppy, 1995)
- Lisa Simon (Sesame Street: Gabi's Bike, 1995)
- Douglas Sloan (Point of View - Gourmet, 1990; Inside Out, Soul of the Suit, What Matters Now, and Cure 2000, 1995; USA "Help One Person, Help the World", 1998)
- Linden Soles (CNN Presents… America Mourns
- Andrew Solt (The History of Rock 'n' Roll: Rock 'n' Roll Explodes, Britain Invades, America Fights Back and Up From the Underground, 1995)
- Michael Sporn (The Red Shoes, 1990; Whitewash, 1994)
- Susan Steinberg (Edward R. Murrow: This Reporter, 1991; The History of Rock 'n' Roll: Pluggin In, 1995; Don Hewitt: 90 Minutes on 60 Minutes, 1998)
- David Sutherland (Feast of the Gods, 1991; George Washington: The Man Who Wouldn't Be King, 1993; Discovering Women: High Energy, 1995)
- Julie Taymor (Oedipus Rex, 1993)
- Kit Thomas (Burning Down Tomorrow, 1990; A Place To Stand, 1995)
- Mike Tollin (Let Me Be Brave, 1990; Hardwood Dreams, 1994; Hank Aaron: Chasing the Dream, 1995)
- Will Vinton (Go Down Death, 1994)
- Chuck Workman (Superstar: The Life and Times of Andy Warhol, 1993; That Good Night, 1995)
- Dick Young (Behind the Scenes: The Advertising Process At Work, 1990; Education For All, 1990; Profiles In Diplomacy: The U.S. Foreign Service, 1990; Spirit of Communication, 1991; The Making of Ulysses, 1991; TLC, 1991; Home, 1991, 1994; Reflections 1982-1992, 1992; Ariyaratne, 1992; Elise Tel & Paul Lardinois, 1992; Jimmy Carter, 1992; Kanitha, 1992; Diverse Roots, Diverse Forms, 1993; The Multimedia Publishing Studio, 1993; Legacy for Efrain, 1993; Abducted, 1993; Long Island Railroad: A Tradition of Service, 1994; Something's Happening Here, 1994; Investing for Social Gain: Program Related Investments, 1994; The Promise, 1995; Legacy for Efrain (Revised), 1995; You Should Live So Long, 1995; The Flame, 1996; A Simple Gift, 1998; Radio Astronomy: Observing the Invisible Universe, 1999)
- Roger Young (Joseph, 1995; Moses, 1996)

=== 2000s ===
- Billy Crystal (61*, 2001)
- Robert De Niro (Holiday Heart, 2001)
- Steven Thomas Fischer (Freedom Dance, 2007)
- Alex Hakobian (For the Laughs, 2000; Up in Smoke, 2001; On Growing Older, 2001; Salvation, 2002; Girls Own Love, 2005; The Win Win State, 2006)
- John M Harrington (The Cultivated Life: Thomas Jefferson and Wine, 2006)
- Abby Ginzberg (Soul of Justice: Thelton Henderson's American Journey, 2006)
- Barbara Koppel (Bearing Witness, 2005)
- Bill Lichtenstein (West 47th Street 2004)
- Paul McCartney (McCartney in St. Petersburg, 2006)
- Anisa Mehdi (Muslims, 2002)
- Sydney Pollack (Sketches of Frank Gehry, 2007)
- Martin Scorsese (No Direction Home, 2006)
- Dick Young (Denan, 2002; TENEMOS HAMBRE: We Are Hungry, 2004; Hope and Cope: Living With Macular Degeneration, 2005)

=== 2010s ===
- Forest Whitaker (Brick City, 2010)
- Kurt Norton and Phil Mariano (These Amazing Shadows, 2011)
- Bao Nguyen (Juilian, 2011)
- Werner Herzog (Cave of Forgotten Dreams, 2013)
- Steve James (Life Itself, 2015)
- Sally McLean (Shakespeare Republic, 2017)
- Zach Bandler (The Lightkeeper, 2018)
