= David Davidson =

David Davidson may refer to:

== Sports ==
- Dave Davidson (footballer) (1905–1969), Scottish footballer
- David Davidson (baseball) (born 1984), Canadian baseball player
- David Davidson (footballer, born 1934) (1934–2020), Scottish footballer (Manchester City, Workington AFC)
- David Davidson (footballer, born 1986), Ghanaian footballer
- David Davidson (Queen's Park footballer) (fl. 1878–1881), footballer for Queen's Park and Scotland
- Dave Davidson (shot putter), Northern Irish athlete

== Other ==
- David E. Davidson (Entrepreneur, Musician) (Born 1975) American Entrepreneur and Musician
- David Davidson (economist) (1854–1942), Swedish economist
- David Davidson (engineer) (1884–1956), Scottish pyramidologist
- David Davidson (Scottish politician) (1943–2024), Scottish politician
- David Davidson (Canadian politician) (1839–1909), Canadian lumberman and politician
- David Davidson (film director) (born 1953), American film director
- David A. Davidson, Chief of Police of the Los Angeles Police Department
- David Bruce Davidson (born 1961), South African electrical engineer
- David L. Davidson (died 1952), first Town Planning Commissioner of Western Australia
- Sir David Davidson (1811–1900), East India Company army officer and innovator of rifle bullets and telescopic sights

== See also ==
- David David (disambiguation)
