= David David =

David David may refer to:

- David David (fur trader) (1764–1824), Canadian fur trader, businessman, and militia officer
- David Mathayo David (born 1969), Member of Parliament in the National Assembly of Tanzania
- David David (surgeon) (born 1940), Australian surgeon
- David David-Weill (1871–1952), French-American banker and art collector

== See also ==
- David & David, an American rock duo
- David Davis (disambiguation)
- David Davidson (disambiguation)
