= USS General LeRoy Eltinge =

US Navy ship built in 1945

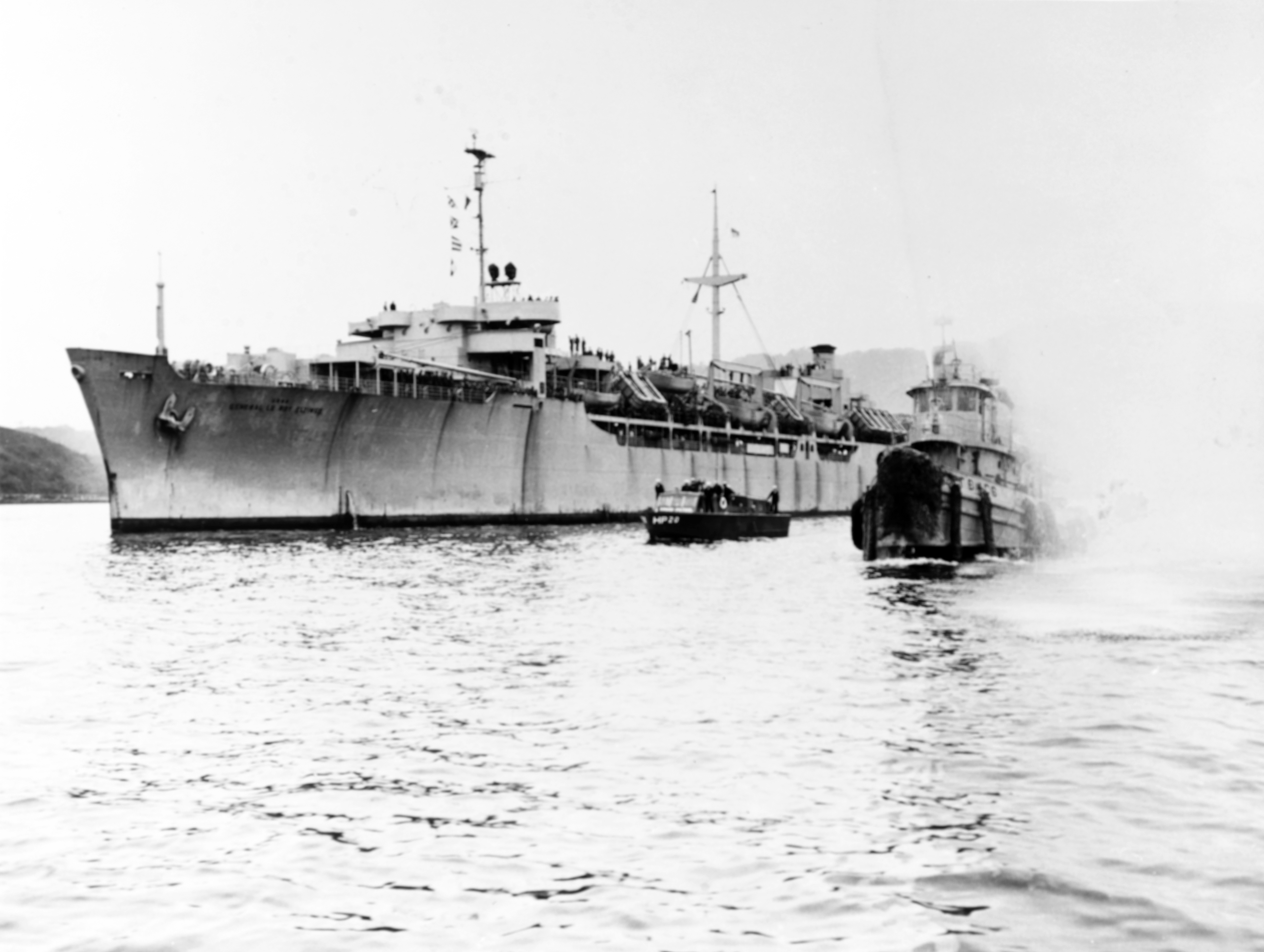
- USNS General LeRoy Eltinge (T-AP-154) leaving Sasebo, Japan, on 30 April 1951

History

United States
- Name: General LeRoy Eltinge
- Namesake: LeRoy Eltinge
- Builder: Kaiser Shipyards; Richmond, California
- Launched: 20 September 1944
- Sponsored by: Mrs. James McCloud
- Acquired: 21 February 1945
- Commissioned: 21 February 1945
- Decommissioned: 29 May 1946
- In service: after June 1946 (Army); 20 July 1950 (MSTS)
- Out of service: 20 July 1950 (Army); January 1967 (MSTS)
- Renamed: SS Robert E. Lee, December 1969; SS Robert Toombs, September 1973
- Reclassified: T-AP-154, 1 March 1950
- Stricken: June 1946
- Identification: IMO number: 7027215
- Fate: Scrapped 1980

General characteristics
- Class & type: General G. O. Squier-class transport ship
- Displacement: As built: 9,950 tons (light), 17,250 tons (full); Refitted to 13,100 gross tons in 1946 by U.S. Army
- Length: 522 ft 10 in (159.36 m)
- Beam: 71 ft 6 in (21.79 m)
- Draft: 24 ft (7.32 m)
- Propulsion: single-screw steam turbine with 9,900 shp (7,400 kW)
- Speed: 17 knots (31 km/h)
- Capacity: 3,823 troops
- Complement: 356 (officers and enlisted)
- Armament: 4 × 5"/38 caliber gun mounts; 4 × 40 mm AA gun mounts; 16 × 20 mm AA gun mounts

USS General LeRoy Eltinge (AP-154) was a General G. O. Squier-class transport ship for the US Navy in World War II. She was named in honor of US Army general LeRoy Eltinge. She was transferred to the US Army as USAT General LeRoy Eltinge in 1946. On 20 July 1950 she was transferred to the Military Sea Transportation Service (MSTS) as USNS General LeRoy Eltinge (T-AP-154). She was later sold for commercial use and operated under the names SS Robert E. Lee and SS Robert Toombs, before being scrapped in 1980.

== Operational history ==
International radio call sign of General LeRoy Eltinge
November	Mike	Charlie	Uniform

General LeRoy Eltinge (AP-154) was launched 20 September 1944 by Kaiser Shipbuilding Co., Inc., Yard 3, Richmond, California; sponsored by Mrs. James McCloud; acquired by the Navy and commissioned 21 February 1945.

After shakedown out of San Diego, General LeRoy Eltinge departed San Pedro 23 March with 3,100 troops for Calcutta, India, arriving 27 April via Melbourne, Australia. Underway 7 May with more troops, she debarked some at Tinian and others at Guam, before arriving San Francisco 27 June with 1,161 troops embarked at Pearl Harbor. She sailed 20 June for Magic-Carpet duty in the Atlantic, arriving Norfolk 14 July. Between 30 July and 14 September she made two round trips from Norfolk to Marseille, France, to transport 6,206 home-bound veterans. On 29 September she departed Norfolk for Karachi, India, where she embarked veterans for Magic-Carpet passage to the United States, arriving New York 11 November.

Clearing New York 29 November for further duty in the Pacific, General LeRoy Eltinge carried replacement troops to the Canal Zone, proceeded to Shanghai and the Philippines and returned to Seattle, Washington, 26 January 1946 with veterans embarked at Manila. On a voyage from 3 March to 6 April she carried rotation troops to Korea and returned veterans to Seattle, before departing 27 April for New York. She arrived 13 May, decommissioned 29 May, was returned to the Maritime Commission and stricken from the Navy List June 1946. In 1949, the General LeRoy Eltinge was used to transport emigrants from Displaced Persons camps of World War II.

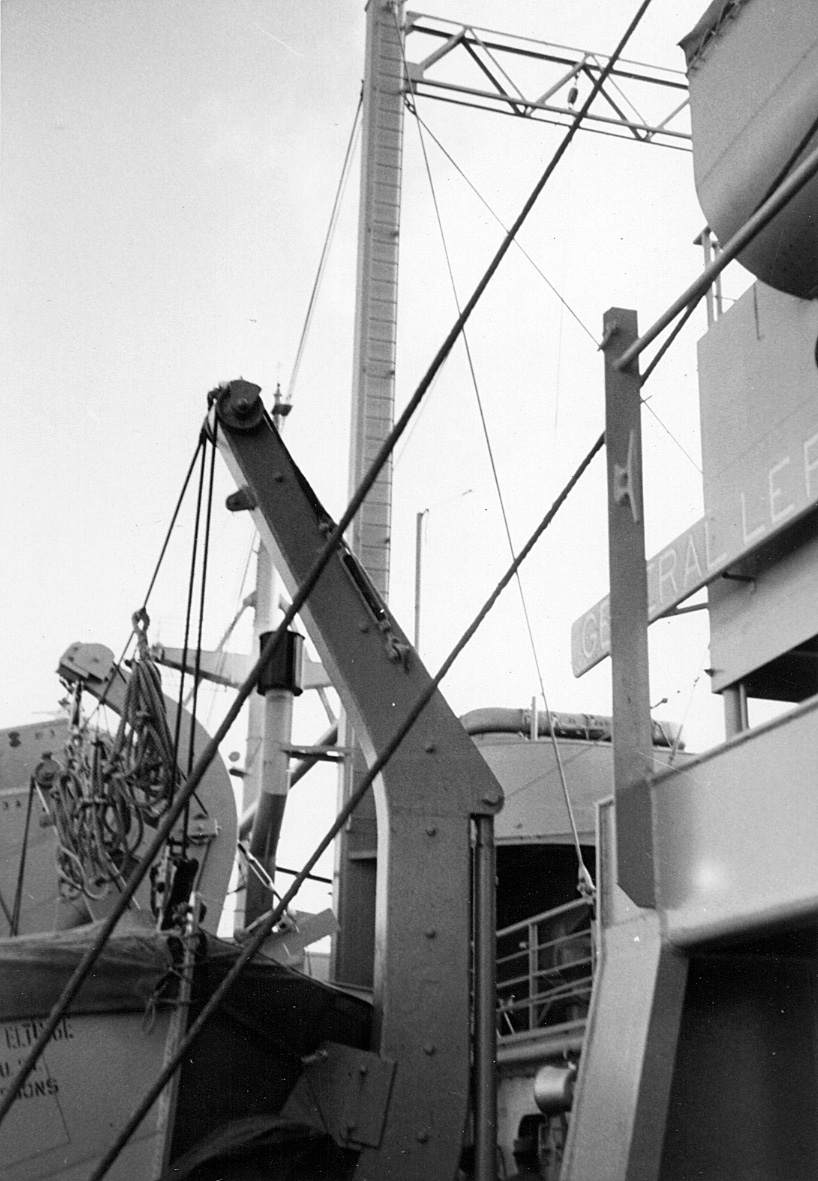
Photo aboard ship during Korean War

Reacquired 20 July 1950, from Maritime Commission General LeRoy Eltinge joined MSTS 1 August while operating in the Western Pacific. After joining MSTS, she participated in several major troop and refugee operations. For more than a year she transported troops from Seattle and San Francisco to Japan and Korea. In October 1951 she supported the International Refugee Program, making two trips from New York to Bremerhaven, Germany. The following year she made several runs for the United Nations, including the transportation of Dutch troops from Rotterdam to Korea. During 1953 she carried additional refugees from Bremerhaven to New York and transported Ethiopian and Greek troops to Korea. Her MSTS service continued until she was placed in reduced operational status 26 November 1955 at New York.

General LeRoy Eltinge resumed operations between the United States and Europe 18 May 1956. Following the Hungarian Revolution 23 October – 4 November 1956, she supported the refugee relief program; and during December she embarked several thousand refugees at Bremerhaven for passage to the United States. The 2007 documentary film Freedom Dance, which follows artist Edward Hilbert and his wife, Judy, during their escape from Hungary includes an account of this voyage of General LeRoy Eltinge. The ship suffered through a large storm during the crossing of the Atlantic.

From May to September 1957 she made UN runs to Turkey and Thailand. After the Lebanon crisis of July 1958, she conducted two voyages to Beirut during October to return troops to France and Germany; General LeRoy Eltinge had the distinction of hauling the final load of troops out of Beirut.

On November 6th 1957, USS Leroy Eltinge crossed the Arctic Circle to enter the Northern Domain of the Polar Bear.

She continued to operate in support of UN programs through 1959. While en route from New York to İzmir Turkey on 24 August 1960 she assisted in the rescue of 26 survivors from SS Halcyon Mediterranean, which had collided with tanker SS Esso Switzerland off the coast of Spain. Returning to New York 1 September, she again assumed reduced operational status 26 September.

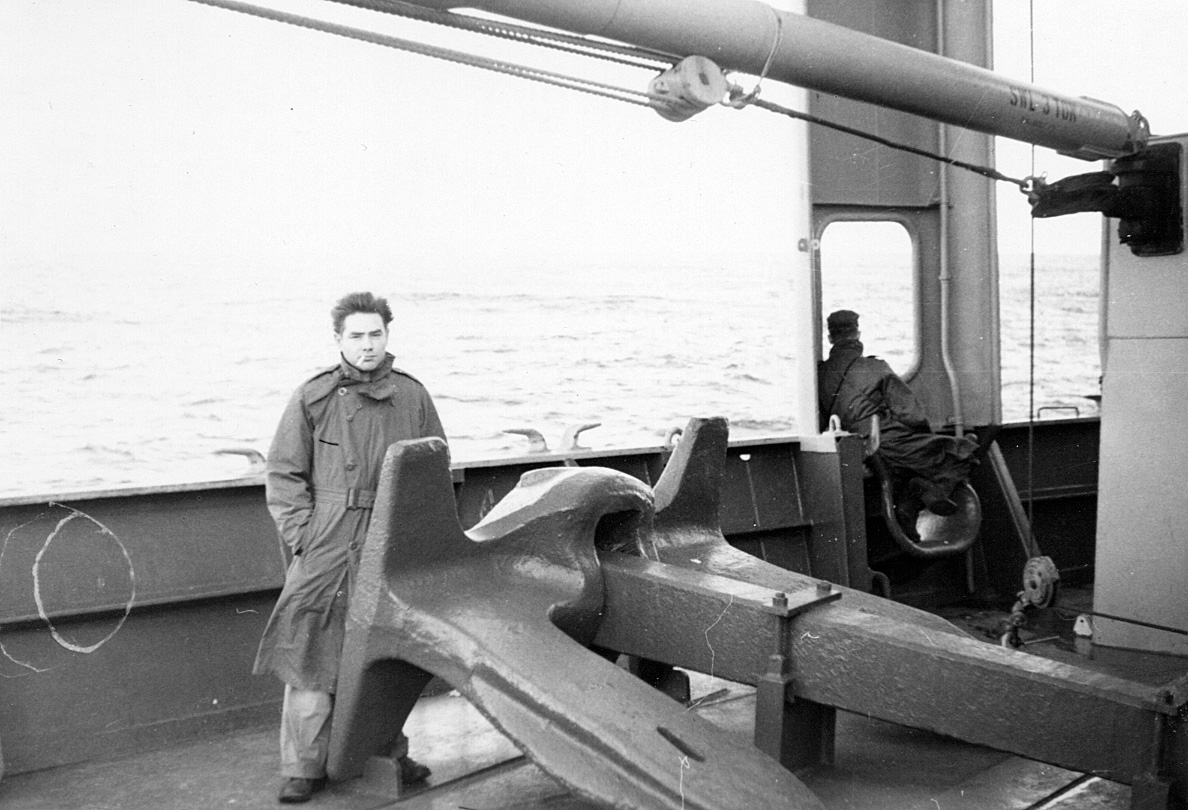
US soldiers aboard ship, Korean War

Following the outbreak of violence in the Belgian Congo in July 1960, General LeRoy Eltinge departed New York 20 February 1961 to support the UN peace mission. After lifting a cargo of famine relief supplies to Pointe-Noire, Congo Republic 11 March; she steamed, via Cape Town, South Africa, to Port Swettenham, Malaya and Bombay, India to embark 1207 troops for the UN Congo operations. Departing Bombay 15 April, she debarked troops and supplies at Mombasa, Kenya, and Dar es Salaam, Tanganyika. After operating along the African coast from Nigeria to South Africa, she was released from UN operations and departed Cape Town for the United States 13 May, arriving New York 30 May. She returned to reduced operational status 29 June. Departing New York 16 July 1962, she sailed via the Panama Canal to San Francisco where she arrived 1 August to resume reserve status.

In response to the mounting crisis in South Vietnam, she returned to service 13 May 1965 and embarked from Oakland, CA 2,497 troops of the 101st Airborne Division, an Engineering Battalion, the 510th Engineer Co., Maintenance DS, for Southeast Asia. Painted entirely gray, and not in the best of condition, the ship lost all power on seven occasions and was stranded at sea until it was towed to Midway Island. The troops were allowed to disembark for one afternoon and relax on the beach. They waited for another World War II carrier to take them to Cam Ranh Bay, Vietnam, after stops in Manila and Subic Bay, the Philippines. One of the paratroopers, and many others, wondered what battle General Eltinge had lost to have such an apparently sorry ship named after him.

In late November 1965 General LeRoy Eltinge again supported the US escalation in South Vietnam and Southeast Asia through sealifts of men and supplies from west coast ports to the Far East. Her cargo included the 1st Infantry Division, the first full infantry division transported to the Vietnam War. Along with the more than 1,500 infantry troops were selected members of the 519th Military Intelligence Battalion from Fort Bragg, North Carolina. In September 1966, the Eltinge transported the 2nd Battalion (175mm) 94th Field Artillery from San Francisco to Da Nang, Vietnam with a stop at Okinawa. She returned to San Francisco in January 1967, underwent overhaul, was transferred to the Maritime Commission, and was placed in ready reserve status as part of the National Defense Reserve Fleet.

In 1968, General LeRoy Eltinge was sold for commercial use to Waterman Carriers, Inc. of New York and rebuilt as a 10,562 gross ton general cargo ship at Portland. In December 1969 she was renamed SS Robert E. Lee, and she was renamed Robert Toombs in September 1973. In April 1980 the ship was scrapped at Kaohsiung, Taiwan.
