= Passionate Minds =

2006 novel by David Bodanis

- The front cover of Passionate Minds
- Author: David Bodanis
- Cover artist: Debbie Clement (design)
- Language: English
- Genre: Novel
- Published: 2006 Little, Brown
- Publication place: United Kingdom
- Media type: Print
- Pages: 312
- ISBN: 0-316-73085-8
- OCLC: 63396789

Passionate Minds: The Great Enlightenment Love Affair is a 2006 book by author David Bodanis. Written in the form of a novel, the book deals with the life and love of Voltaire and his mistress, scientist Émilie du Châtelet. It also discusses the theories they propounded about life, theology and the nature of the universe. The story was written with the aid of historic letters of correspondence between Émilie and Voltaire, as well as between several other prominent figures of the Enlightenment.

== Citation ==
The full bibliographic citation of the book in question is:

- Bodanis, David (2006). Passionate Minds: The Great Love Affair of the Enlightenment. New York, NY, USA: Crown. ISBN 9780307237200.

== Background ==
The novel is set in the period of development in Western Europe known as the Age of Enlightenment. At the time new scientific discoveries were being made, and people began to question society and the ruling classes. The story is set against a backdrop of social and political turmoil. The book takes place over a period of 43 years, from 1706 to 1749.

== Themes ==
The book utilizes several themes to convey its story to the reader. Predominate themes include the rights of women. Though not actively campaigning for women's rights, this book highlights the way in which woman were treated during the pre-Enlightenment period. This is emphasized by the manner in which du Châtelet's scientific breakthroughs and discoveries are passed off as unimportant, simply because of her gender.

== Plot ==
The book starts with a "flash forward" in which Émilie du Châtelet is briefly introduced. It is June in the year 1749, and Émilie is in the final stages of her pregnancy. She is struggling to complete a book of her theories and calculations, and fears that she will not have enough time to finish the thesis. The book then jumps back in time to the year 1706, and to a younger Émilie. She has not yet met Voltaire, and is but ten years old. She lives with her parents, and is considered an unusual child because of her love of books and reading.
