= Microphotography (literature) =

Microphotography is a writing style that emerged in the early 1990s in science journalism. The style is named after micrographs and is distinctive for its highly detailed, worm's eye or microscopic view of the macroscopic world.

One of the flagship works in this style was David Bodanis's commercially prominent The Secret House: 24 hours in the strange & wonderful world in which we spend our nights and days. This book followed daily life in a typical enclosed human habitat in minute detail, featuring detailed physical and biological explanations.
