= Eltinge =

Eltinge is a surname. Notable people with the surname include:

- Julian Eltinge (1881–1941), American stage and film actor and female impersonator
- LeRoy Eltinge (1872–1931), United States Army officer
