= David Bodanis =

American author, speaker (active c. 1984– )

- Born: Chicago, Illinois, U.S.
- Education: University of Chicago
- Occupation: Writer
- Writing career
- Period: c. 1984–present
- Notable awards: Royal Society Science Book Prize

David Bodanis is a London-based American speaker, business advisor and writer of nonfiction books, including E=mc^{2}: A Biography of the World's Most Famous Equation (2001), which was translated into 20 languages.

== Early life and education ==
Bodanis was born and brought up in Chicago, Illinois, and read mathematics, physics and history at the University of Chicago, graduating with an AB in 1977. In his early twenties he moved to Paris, where he began his career as a foreign correspondent for the International Herald Tribune. A move to the South of France followed, and he then split his time between France and London, combining writing with stints as a science presenter on the children's television series Wide Awake Club, which aired in the UK from 1984 to 1989.

Bodanis moved to the UK full-time in the late 1980s, combining writing with teaching social sciences at St Antony's College, Oxford, consulting for the Royal Dutch Shell Scenario Prediction unit, and speaking engagements including at conferences and Davos.

== Works ==
In 1986, Bodanis had his first commercial authorial success with The Secret House: 24 Hours in the Strange & Wonderful World in Which We Spend Our Nights and Days, which reached no 5 on The New York Times Best Seller list and established him as a popular science writer. This book introduces Bodanis' "microphotography" writing style, in which the author takes a worm's-eye view perspective that allows him to observe many obscure and complex phenomena of everyday life.

In 2001, he published E=mc^{2}: A Biography of the World's Most Famous Equation which was translated into 20 languages, and longlisted for the Samuel Johnson Prize for non-fiction. In 2005, it was made into a documentary for Channel 4, and aired on PBS under the name Einstein's Big Idea. In 2009, E=mc^{2} was made into a ballet by the Birmingham Royal Ballet, for which director David Bintley won the South Bank Award for best British Dance of the year.

Electric Universe: How Electricity Switched on the Modern World followed in 2006, and won the Royal Society Science Book Prize for Best Science Book of the Year. Bodanis caused some controversy by pledging to donate his prize to the family of the late government scientist, Dr David Kelly.

In 2006, Bodanis published Passionate Minds, the story of a brilliant but forgotten French scientist, Émilie du Châtelet, and her intellectual love affair with Voltaire. Passionate Minds was the BBC's Book of the Week on Radio 4 in June 2006, and featured on the cover of The Economist.

In 2013, Bodanis contributed an essay, "Computer-Generated Fascism" published in John Brockman's Edge Question series, What Should We Be Worried About? Real Scenarios That Keep Scientists Up at Night.

Bodanis's Einstein’s Greatest Mistake: The Life of a Flawed Genius was published September 2016. His essay appeared at NPR in December 2016.

In November 2020, Bodanis published The Art of Fairness: The Power of Decency in a World Turned Mean.

== Awards ==
- 2006: Electric Universe: How Electricity Switched on the Modern World – winner of Royal Society Science Book Prize

== Personal life ==
Bodanis lives in London with his second wife and stepson. He has two children by a previous marriage. He pursues kickboxing as an intense hobby.

== Bibliography ==
- Bodanis, David (1984). Being Human. Century. ISBN 978-0712603560.
- Bodanis, David (1985). The Body Book: A Fantastic Voyage to the World Within. Little, Brown. ISBN 978-0316100724.
- Bodanis, David (1986). The Secret House: 24 Hours in the Strange and Unexpected World in which We Spend our Nights and Days. Simon & Schuster. ISBN 067160032X. OCLC 13643652.
- Bodanis, David (1988). Web of Words: The Ideas Behind Politics. Macmillan. ISBN 978-0333389751.
- Bodanis, David (1992). The Secret Garden: Dawn to Dusk in the Astonishing Hidden World of the Garden. Simon & Schuster. ISBN 978-0671663537.
- Bodanis, David (2001). E=mc^{2}: A Biography of the World's Most Famous Equation. Bloomsbury Publishing USA. ISBN 978-0802718211.
- Bodanis, David (2005). Electric Universe: How Electricity Switched On the Modern World. Crown. ISBN 978-0-307-33598-2.
- Bodanis, David (2006). Passionate Minds: The Great Love Affair of the Enlightenment, Featuring the Scientist Emilie du Chatelet, the Poet Voltaire, Sword Fights, Book Burnings, Assorted Kings. Crown Publishers. ISBN 0-307-23720-6.
- Bodanis, David (2016). Einstein's Greatest Mistake: The Life of a Flawed Genius. HarperCollins. ISBN 978-1-4087-0809-5.
- Bodanis, David (2020). The Art of Fairness: The Power of Decency in a World Turned Mean ISBN 0349128219
