= The American Field Trip =

- Directed by: James Myer
- Release date: 1995
- Country: United States

The American Field Trip is an educational film series that explores unique places of interest across the USA. Episode titles include Exploring Marine Biology, at the Monterey Bay Aquarium in California, and Exploring Space Technology at the NASA Johnson Space Center in Texas. The series won a CINE competition Golden Eagle award in 1995. The series is produced by film maker James Myer.
