= Alto Reed =

American musician (1948–2020)

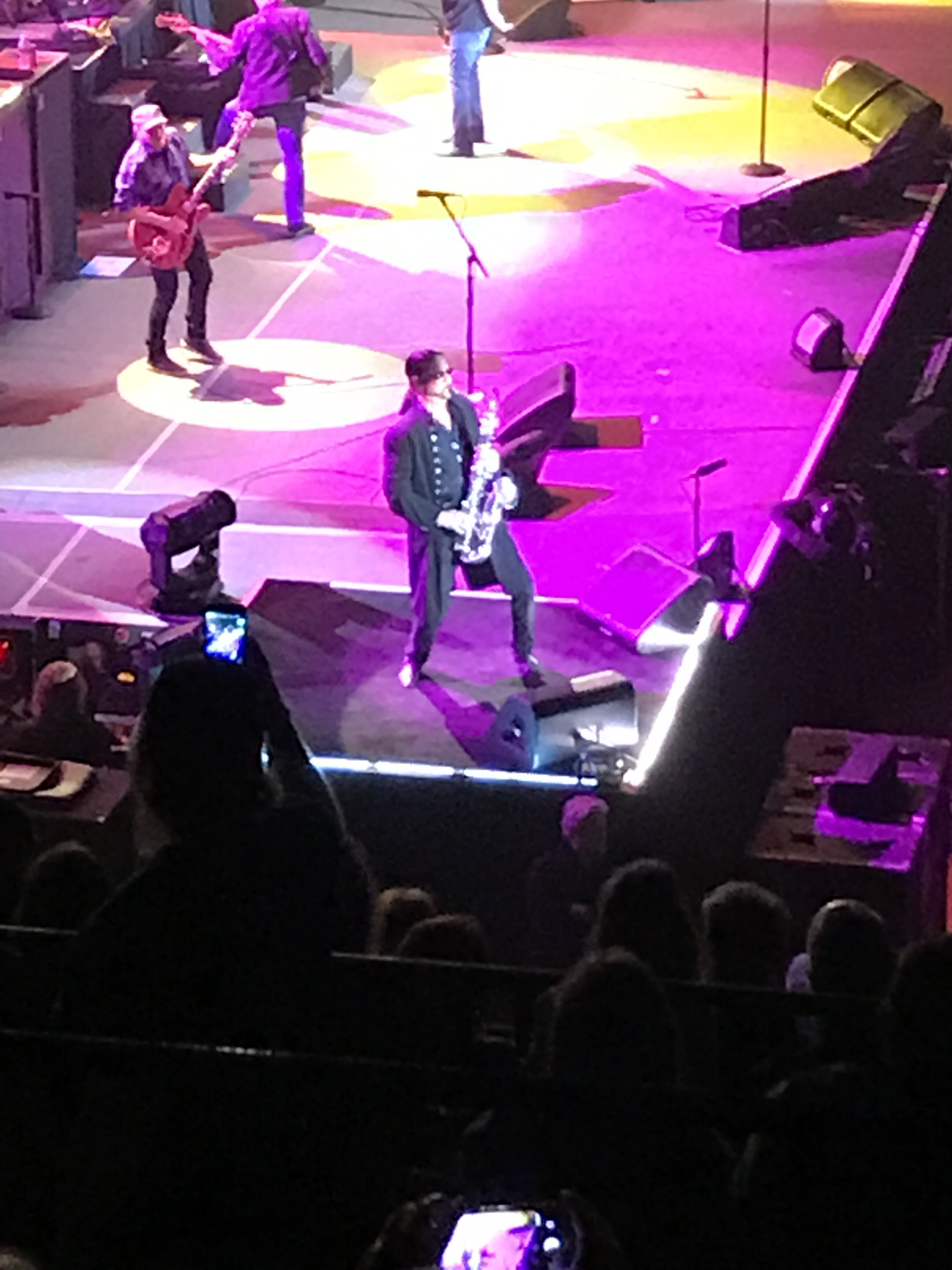
- Alto Reed performing in Billings, Montana, with Bob Seger and the Silver Bullet Band, January 2019

Background information
- Born: Thomas Neal Cartmell; May 16, 1948; Detroit, Michigan, U.S.
- Died: December 30, 2020 (aged 72)
- Genres: Rock; heartland rock; roots rock; rock and roll; pop rock; jazz
- Occupations: Musician; saxophonist
- Instrument: Saxophone
- Years active: 1972–2020

Alto Reed (born Thomas Neal Cartmell, May 16, 1948 – December 30, 2020) was an American saxophonist best known as a long-time member of Bob Seger and the Silver Bullet Band He was a 1966 graduate of Lake Shore High School in St. Clair Shores, Michigan.

== Career ==
His most recognizable performances include the saxophone introduction to "Turn the Page" and the saxophone solo in "Old Time Rock and Roll". Reed also recorded the soundtracks for two of Jeff Daniels' films, and performed with many bands and musicians, such as Foghat, Grand Funk Railroad, Little Feat, Otis Rush, Enchantment, Jamie Oldaker, George Terry, Dave Mason, Spencer Davis, Tico Torres, Dan Aykroyd, James Belushi, The Ventures, George Thorogood, Robin Gibb and in Romania with the band Holograf.

After he attended a Rock & Roll Hall of Fame induction ceremony with Bob Seger & the Silver Bullet Band in 2004, Reed performed with The Ventures in 2008, and played at the Waldorf Astoria when the Ventures invited him to perform with them on "Hawaii Five-O", for their own induction into the Rock & Roll Hall of Fame.

Reed and his band, The Blues Entourage, performed at the 2009 Jamaica Jazz and Blues Festival. One of the members of the band, Steve Thorpe, died in August 2010.

The Reed & Dickinson Band (Alto Reed & Steve Dickinson, singer songwriter) has released an album Tonight We Ride, with musicians Jimmy McCarty and Johnny Badanjek, Jimmy Bones, Stephanie Eulinberg, lead guitarist Bobby East, Roger Noonan, Bernie Palo and Jeff Fawlkes. Reed played at Canadian blues festivals including Windsor and London, Ontario, with his Motor City AllStars, composed of musicians Bernie Palo, Steve Byrnes and vocalist Kathleen Murray and the rhythm section from the 'Groove Council'.

In 1998, Reed, Ortheia Barnes, and Michael Brock of the Dramatics starred in a Sue Marx-produced tourism advertisement for the Detroit Convention Bureau titled "It's a Great Time in Detroit".

Prior to joining Bob Seger and the Silver Bullet Band, Reed (as Tom Cartmell) was a member of the Lansing Michigan based band, Ormandy.

Reed toured with Bob Seger and the Silver Bullet Band for 42 years starting with Back In 72, Seger 7, Beautiful Loser, which finally led up to the multiplatinum, breakthrough album, Live Bullet, Night Moves, Stranger In Town, Against The Wind, Nine Tonight, Like a Rock, The Distance, The Fire Inside, A Very Special Xmas and several more including most recently, Ride Out.

Reed most recently performed with Dave Mason, Steven Tyler, Pat Simmons and Michael McDonald, Fergie, Danny D, Lynda Carter, Alice Cooper & Band, at the December 31, 2016, New Year's Eve for the Shep Gordon Maui Food Bank Gala in Maui, Hawaii, raising enough money for 300,000 meals. Then again for the World Whale Watch Day Fundraiser in Maui, and with Mick Fleetwood at Mick's Lahaina Club plus, in March 2017, as a special guest with Willie K. at the Willie K. Bluesfest on Maui.

== Honors, awards, distinctions ==
On May 19, 2012, Reed was inducted into the Canadian Blues Hall of Fame in Windsor, Ontario, and headlined at blues festivals across Canada in summer 2012 including London, Ontario, on July 13 and Windsor, Ontario, on July 14, 2012.

Reed performed "The Star-Spangled Banner" before Game 4 of the American League championship series of Major League Baseball on October 12, 2011, and before the Thanksgiving Day NFL game between the Detroit Lions and Houston Texans on November 22, 2012. He was a regular in playing the American national anthem.

== Personal life and death ==
Reed died of colorectal cancer on December 30, 2020. He was 72 years old.
