= Ortheia Barnes =

American singer

Ortheia Barnes-Kennerly (October 18, 1944 – May 15, 2015) was an American R&B and jazz singer who opened for Motown greats including Stevie Wonder and later entered the ministry.

== Career ==
Barnes-Kennerly recorded in the 1960s for Detroit's Mickay Records and Coral Records, a Decca Records label. While never signing with Motown Records, she opened for a number of its stars, including Wonder, Marvin Gaye and Gladys Knight. She was the sister of singer-songwriter J.J. Barnes.

In 1998, Barnes, Alto Reed, and Michael Brock of the Dramatics starred in a Sue Marx-produced tourism advertisement for the Detroit Convention Bureau titled "It's a Great Time in Detroit".

== Death ==
Barnes died in May 2015, in St. Thomas in the U.S. Virgin Islands, where she went for a performance, friend and bass player, Ralphe Armstrong told the Detroit Free Press. She had at least two strokes in recent years and died of heart failure, she was 70.
