= Mar Elepaño =

American film director (1954–2025)

- Born: Mariano Elepano; 1954; Philippines
- Died: 2025
- Education: USC School of Cinematic Arts

Mariano "Mar" Elepaño (1954–2025) was a Filipino American independent filmmaker, teacher, and the production supervisor of the John C. Hench Division of Animation and Digital Arts, USC School of Cinematic Arts.

Elepaño was born and raised in the Philippines. He came to the United States to study film at the USC School of Cinematic Arts in 1975. He joined the faculty at USC in 1993.

Some of his short works of experimental animation (Lion Dance, Pendito, Winter, Burp, and Take 5) were screened at the Asian American International Film Festival, New York, New York July 27, 1989 and at Filmex: Los Angeles International Film Exposition (Short Film) March 14–30, 1979. In addition, Winter was screened at the Contemporary Animation from Los Angeles Artists Festival in 2006. Rolando B. Tolentino in Animation in Asia and the Pacific described Elepano as "the prime [Filipino] mover of computer animation" in the United States (p. 177).

Elepaño was a Fulbright Scholar in 2001. In 2007, he received a "California Council for the Humanities Grant Award to the Khmer Girls in Action (KGA)" which helped "teenage Cambodian American girls in the Long Beach [...] develop digital narratives about their identity and their connection or disconnection to their parents' generation."

Elepano died in 2025.

== Awards ==
- 2009 University of Southern California President’s Staff Achievement Award
- 2007 California Council for the Humanities Grant Award
- 2003 Steve Tatsukawa Memorial Fund Award
- 2002 USC School of Cinematic Arts Staff Achievement Award
- 2001 Fulbright Award (Malaysia)

== Publications ==
- Labtalk in Moving the Image: Independent Asian Pacific American Media Arts, edited by Russell Leong. Los Angeles: UCLA Asian American Studies Center Press, 1992.
