= James Myer =

American film director

James Myer (born October 19, 1951) is an American documentarist and educational filmmaker. He produced Multiple Personality: Reality and Illusion, a documentary that chronicled the life of Chris Costner Sizemore. Sizemore, who was depicted in the book and film The Three Faces of Eve, was diagnosed in the 1950s with multiple personality disorder. Other productions include The American Field Trip, an educational series that takes viewers behind the scenes of unique places across the US. He won the CINE competition Golden Eagle Award for the series in 1995.

== Awards ==
- CINE Awards
- National Educational Media Network Silver Apple
- Awards Site
