= David Davidson (1811–1900) =

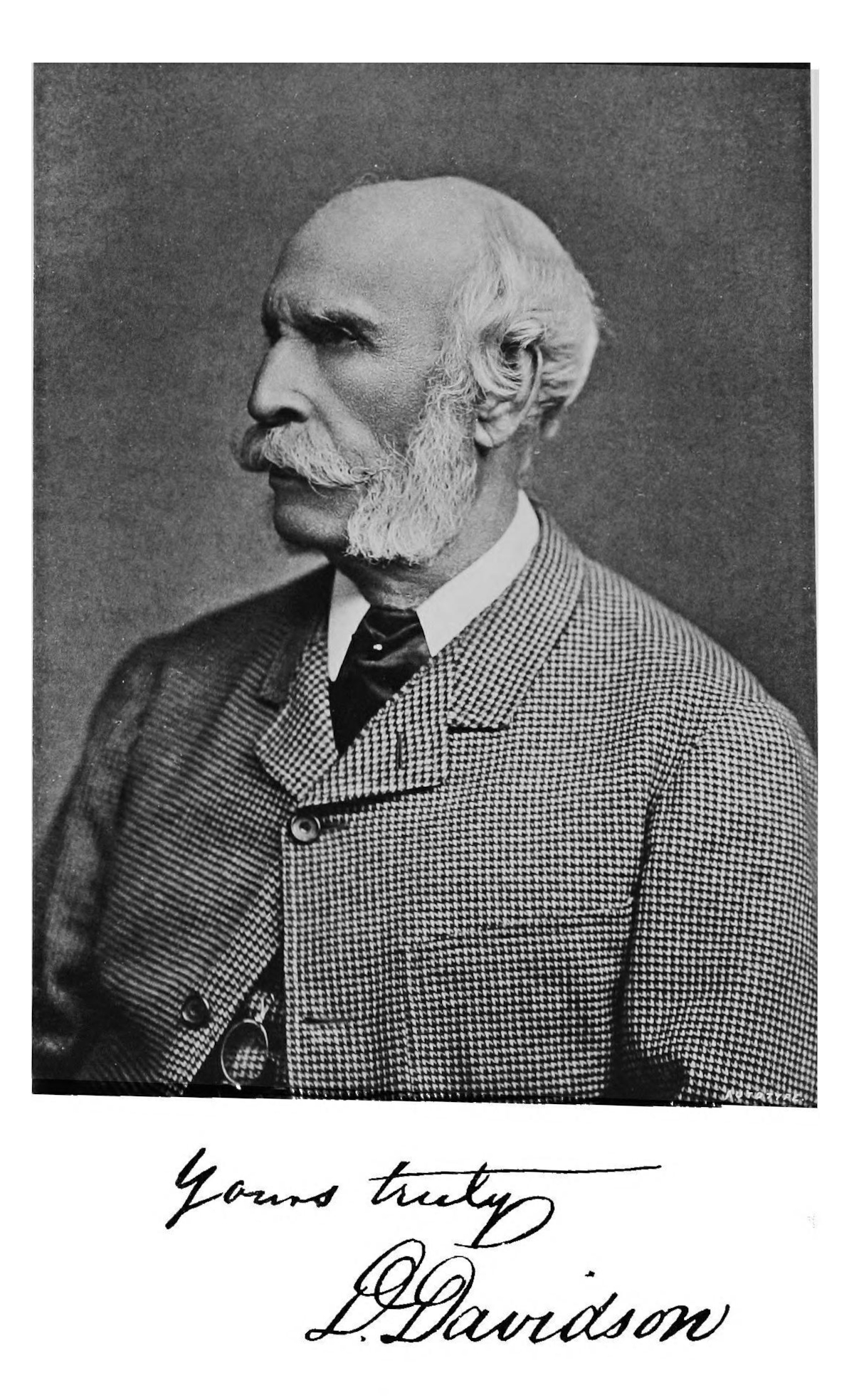
Sir David Davidson in 1890

Sir David Davidson (c. 1811 – 18 May 1900) was an army officer in the East India Company in India who worked on improvements to rifle bullets and telescopic sights. He was also a childhood friend and correspondent of Jane Welsh Carlyle.

== Life and work ==
Davidson was born in Haddington where his father Henry M. Davidson was county Sheriff Clerk. He went to the local school and studied French from John Johnstone. His childhood friends included Jane Welsh Carlyle. In 1827 he moved to India to serve in the Bengal Native Infantry under the East India Company and retired in 1848 with the rank of Major. While stationed in Asirgarh Fort in 1832, he had a telescopic sight attached to a single-barrel rifle made by Samuel Staudenmeyer. The next year he wrote to the Bombay Sporting Magazine on his experiments with elongated rifle bullets with a fluted centre which he claimed increased their range and stability. He also developed a "air-cane" a walking cane with a rifle barrel and a compressed air system in the handgrip that allowed shooting a ball. He used it to kill snakes, fish and birds while on walks. He served in western India where he was a shooting companion of James Outram. He served with Edward Goldsmid and (later Sir) George Wingate on the revenue surveys in the Deccan region. As part of this he introduced the use of graphs to depict revenue statistics (then supposedly novel). He retired in 1848 and settled in Edinburgh where he built a mansion Woodcroft with the motto at the entrance Meliora semper cogita (lit. "Always think better") copied, according to Jane Carlyle, from a home in Haddington. He was later made an honorary colonel of the Queen's Edinburgh Rifle Volunteer Brigade. He took an interest in theology, literature and poetry. Here he also began to develop his telescoping rifle sight system working along with gunmaker John Dickson & Sons and the optics firm Alexander Adie & Sons both on Princess Street. He corresponded with Professor Charles Piazzi Smyth on this work and the idea was read in a paper to the British Association in 1850. Some of these guns were demonstrated at the Great Exhibition of 1851. In 1855 he patented a "detached collimator" and an "improved apparatus for point ordnance and restoring the aim of the piece either by day or night when it is once obtained". In 1897 he was knighted by Queen Victoria.
