= David Davidson (footballer, born 1986) =

Ghanaian footballer

Personal information
- Full name: David Davidson
- Date of birth: November 17, 1986 (age 39)
- Place of birth: Accra, Ghana
- Height: 1.92 m (6 ft 4 in)
- Position: Midfielder

Youth career
- 2006: Hearts of Oak

Senior career*
Years	Team	Apps	(Gls)
2005	Hearts of Oak		
2005–2007	Fenerbahçe A2		
2007	KooTeePee	18	(0)
2007–2009	TP-47	47	(7)
2009	Taraz	29	(6)
2010	Vakhsh Qurghonteppa	31	(18)
2011–2012	Roi Et United	55	(5)
2013–2014	Pattani	16	(8)
2016–2017	Philadelphia Fury	28	(5)
- * Club domestic league appearances and goals

David Davidson (born November 17, 1986) is a Ghanaian footballer.

== Career ==
After starting his career with Hearts of Oak in Ghana, Davidson went on trial with Fenerbache in 2006, eventually spending two-year with their second team. Davidson then played for KooTeePee and TP-47 in Finland before moving to Kazakhstan Premier League side FC Taraz during the summer of 2009. The following September, Davidson signed with Tajik League side Vakhsh Qurghonteppa. After his time in central Asia, Davidson played for semi-professional teams Roi Et United and Pattani in Thailand before signing with Philadelphia Fury of the American Soccer League at the start of 2016. The Philadelphia Fury was titled as the 2016 ASL Spring and Fall Champions.
