= Kit Thomas =

American film maker and record producer (born 1947)

- Born: May 25, 1947 (age 78)
- Genres: Jazz; Pop; World
- Occupations: Record producer Filmmaker

Kit Thomas (born May 25, 1947) is an American film maker and record producer.

== Life and career ==
As a filmmaker, Kit Thomas' projects have won numerous awards including two Emmys for Spaceship Earth: Our Global Environment, which he co-produced and directed for the Disney Channel, and an Oscar nomination for Burning Down Tomorrow, which he produced and directed for rock musician Sting to raise awareness about the global rainforest crisis. He co-produced the ECO (Earth Communication Office) PSA campaign which was adopted by the United Nations Environment Program and, according to a Pepperdine University study, has been seen by over two billion people worldwide, a world record for public service announcements. He was selected by the United Nations to co-produce and direct their official 50th Anniversary film, A Place To Stand.

As a record producer, Thomas has produced over sixty albums of jazz, pop, and world music. He has been a member of the National Academy of Recording Arts and Sciences since 1985, serving eight years on the NARAS Board of Governors, and twenty-six years as Chairman of a National Screening Committee for the Grammy Awards.

As a philanthropist, Thomas supports the Women's Earth Alliance, Global Green, the Jane Goodall Institute, Amazon Watch and MusiCares. In 2002 he founded the Common Ground Interfaith Forum in Philadelphia and served as its Executive Director from 2002 to 2008.

A resident of Santa Barbara, Thomas is Co-Producer and Director of Industry Relations for the Illuminate Film Festival and Executive Director of The Wise Planet Living Library, a non-profit internet wisdom resource for the next generations. He continues to direct and produce messaging campaigns for local and national non-profit initiatives that promote environmental stewardship and meaningful social change.
