= LeRoy Eltinge =

United States Army general

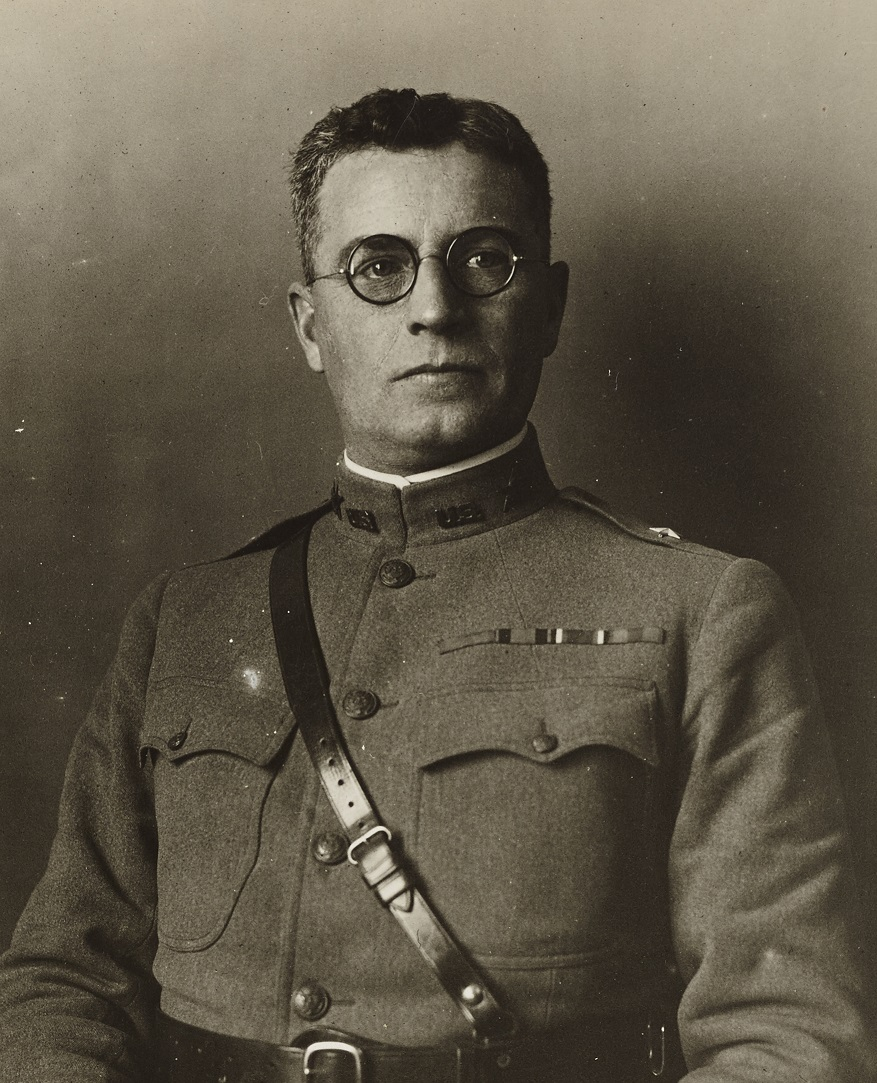
- Brigadier General Eltinge, Chaumont, France, November 1918.
- Born: September 17, 1872; South Woodstock, New York, United States
- Died: May 13, 1931 (aged 58); Fort Omaha, Nebraska, United States
- Burial place: Arlington National Cemetery, Virginia, United States
- Spouse: Effee B. Trotter
- Children: 1
- Military career
- Allegiance: United States
- Branch: United States Army
- Service years: 1896–1931
- Rank: Brigadier general
- Service number: 0-502
- Unit: Cavalry Branch
- Conflicts: Spanish–American War; Philippine–American War; Second Occupation of Cuba; Pancho Villa Expedition; World War I
- Awards: Army Distinguished Service Medal; Silver Star; Legion of Honour; Croix de Guerre; Order of the Crown (Belgium); Order of the Crown of Italy; Companion of the Bath; Order of La Solidaridad

LeRoy Eltinge (September 17, 1872 – May 13, 1931) was a United States Army officer in the late 19th and early 20th centuries. He served in several wars and conflicts, including the Spanish–American War and World War I, for which he received the Army Distinguished Service Medal and multiple other awards.

== Biography ==
Eltinge was born on September 17, 1872, in South Woodstock, New York. he graduated from the United States Military Academy in 1896 and was commissioned into the 4th Cavalry Regiment.

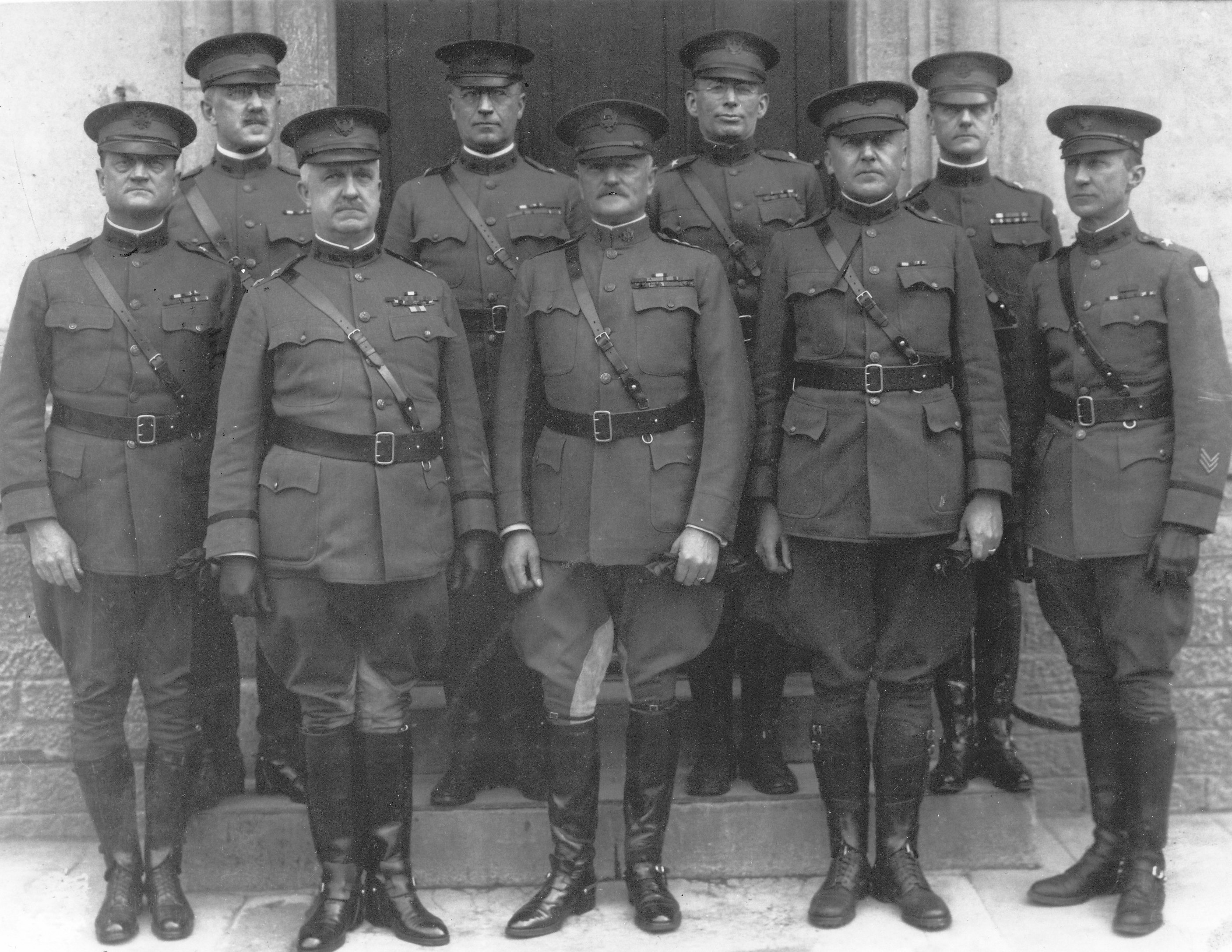
General John J. Pershing and members of his General Headquarters (GHQ) staff, France, 1918. Standing in the back row, second from the left, is Brigadier General LeRoy Eltinge.

Eltinge served in the Philippines from 1898 to 1899 as part of the Spanish–American War and from 1901 to 1903 as part of the Philippine–American War. He was wounded in the latter conflict and received a Silver Star. Eltinge served in the Second Occupation of Cuba from 1906 to 1907, and he became an honor graduate of the School of the Line in 1908. After graduating from the Army Staff College in 1909, he served as an instructor there until 1912. Eltinge went to the border of Mexico in 1914, and he participated in the Pancho Villa Expedition in 1916.

On July 28, 1917, Eltinge went to France as part of the G-3 Operations Section of the General Staff. After becoming Deputy Chief of Staff on May 1, 1918, he was promoted to the rank of brigadier general on August 1, 1918. Eltinge's assignment ended on June 30, 1919. He received the Army Distinguished Service Medal for his efforts in the war, and he received numerous foreign awards. The citation for his Army DSM reads:

The President of the United States of America, authorized by Act of Congress, July 9, 1918, takes pleasure in presenting the Army Distinguished Service Medal to Brigadier General LeRoy Eltinge, United States Army, for exceptionally meritorious and distinguished services to the Government of the United States, in a duty of great responsibility during World War I. As a member of the Operations Section, General Staff, General Headquarters, American Expeditionary Forces, General Eltinge exhibited sound military judgment and foresight in drafting important plans. Later, as Deputy Chief of Staff of the American Expeditionary Forces throughout the period of active operations and thereafter he discharged the important and complex duties of his position with admirable efficiency and by his untiring efforts and devotion to duty rendered conspicuous service to the Government.

Between 1921 and 1923, Eltinge served as Assistant Chief of Staff of the Philippine Department, and he served as the commanding general of the Operations and Training Division of the U.S. Army from June 2, 1924, to April 19, 1925. Eltinge died in Fort Omaha on May 13, 1931. He is buried at Arlington National Cemetery.

== Personal life ==
Eltinge married Effee B. Trotter on December 3, 1897, and they had one daughter together. He was a Baptist.

== Legacy ==
The USS General LeRoy Eltinge (AP-154), which was launched in 1944, was named after Eltinge.

=== Awards ===
(Sources:)

- Army Distinguished Service Medal
- Silver Star
- Legion of Honour (France)
- Croix de Guerre (France)
- Order of the Crown (Belgium)
- Order of the Crown of Italy
- Companion of the Bath (United Kingdom)
- Order of La Solidaridad (Panama)

== Bibliography ==
- Davis, Henry Blaine Jr. (1998). Generals in Khaki. Raleigh, North Carolina: Pentland Press. ISBN 1571970886. OCLC 40298151.
- Marquis Who's Who (1975). Who Was Who In American History – The Military. Chicago, Illinois: Marquis Who's Who. ISBN 0837932017.
