= Animation in Asia and the Pacific =

Animation in Asia and the Pacific is a 2001 book edited by John A. Lent, published by Indiana University Press. John Libbey Publishing distributed the book outside of the United States.

== Contents ==
There are a total of sixteen chapters. The first part includes fourteen of them, essays discussing animation in various Asian countries. Three of the chapters cover anime, including anime in the West. This totals 55 pages. The other countries and regions cataloged include Australia, Mainland China, Hong Kong, the Indian subcontinent mostly India, Malaysia, New Zealand, the Philippines, Singapore, South Korea, and Taiwan.

There are 77 illustrations in color, with the remaining in monochrome black and white.

== Reception ==
Mary Farquhar of Griffith University wrote that the work is "a pleasure to hold, such a pleasure to read, and such a pleasure to simply look at." She stated that she wished that the index of films had complete citation info; she characterized this criticism as "My one quibble".

Alan Neal of Animation World described the book as "important", and that "Overall though, [it] is a significant, hopefully pioneering piece of animation scholarship". The reviewer stated that portions in which the book shows applications to "real life" are when it "is often best". In particular he stated the Hong Kong chapter "is one of the best". Neal stated that he felt disappointment at the sections about anime since they did not cover new territory, and that it "Even on its own terms [...] is sometimes unsatisfactory." He stated that he found "more interesting" portions about anime abroad.

Film History wrote that the images were "Beautifully" done.
