= Young at Heart (1987 film) =

1987 film

- Produced by: Pamela Conn; Sue Marx
- Starring: Louis Gothelf; Reva Shwayder-Gothelf
- Cinematography: Tom Campau
- Production companies: Sue Marx Films; Urban Communications Group
- Distributed by: New Dimension Films
- Release date: 1987
- Running time: 29 minutes
- Country: United States
- Language: English

Young at Heart is a 1987 American short documentary film produced by Pamela Conn and Sue Marx about the painters Louis Gothelf and Reva Shwayder. In 1988, it won an Oscar for Documentary Short Subject at the 60th Academy Awards.

== Cast ==
- Louis Gothelf as Himself
- Reva Shwayder-Gothelf as Herself (as Reva Shwayder)
