= Burning Down Tomorrow =

1990 film

- Directed by: Kit Thomas
- Written by: Neal Rogin, others
- Produced by: Kit Thomas
- Narrated by: Jim Sloyan
- Music by: Oscar Castro-Neves
- Production company: Interscope Communications
- Distributed by: Rainforest Foundation
- Release date: 1990
- Running time: 10 minutes
- Country: United States
- Language: English

Burning Down Tomorrow is a 1990 American short documentary film. Produced and directed by Kit Thomas, the film is about the global rainforest crisis. It was nominated for an Academy Award for Best Documentary Short.
