= Nancy Dine =

American filmmaker (1937–2020)

Nancy Lee Dine (née Nancy Lee Minto; March 7, 1937 – September 6, 2020) was an American filmmaker. Her documentary Jim Dine: A Self-Portrait on the Walls was nominated for an Academy award in 1996.

== Early life ==
Nancy Dine was born in Cleveland, Ohio, in 1937. Her parents were a steelworker and a stay-at-home mother. She graduated with a degree from Ohio University, where she met and married Jim Dine.

== Creative career ==
Throughout her marriage to Jim Dine, Nancy Dine had a frequent role as either assistant, model, muse or producer of his works. In her 50s she took up filmmaking, producing a number of short films. Her film Jim Dine: A Self-Portrait on the Walls was nominated for an Academy award in the category of Best Documentary: Short Subject in 1996.

== Filmography ==
- 1990 Debut
- 1991 Bali Beyond the Postcard
- 1995 Jim Dine: A Self-Portrait on the Walls
- 1996 All About Looking
