= David David (fur trader) =

- Born: October 14, 1764; Montreal, Quebec
- Died: November 30, 1824 (aged 60)
- Occupation(s): Fur trader, businessman

David David (October 14, 1764 – November 30, 1824) was a Canadian fur trader, businessman, and militia officer. David David was born in Montreal to Lazarus David and Phebe Samuel; he was the first Jew born in the province of Quebec.
