= Freedom Dance =

Animated documentary

Freedom Dance is an animated documentary produced by Steven Thomas Fischer and Craig Herron. The film retells the escape of Edward and Judy Hilbert from Communist Hungary during the Hungarian Revolution of 1956. The film is narrated by actress Mariska Hargitay, and won many awards, including the CINE Masters Series Award.
