= David Bruce Davidson =

South African electrical engineer

- Born: 1961 (age 64–65); London
- Education: University of Pretoria; Stellenbosch University
- Known for: Engineering applications of finite element methods
- Awards: NRF President's Award; IEEE Fellowship
- Scientific career
- Fields: Electrical engineering
- Workplaces: CSIR; Stellenbosch University; Curtin University
- Thesis: Parallel processing for computational electromagnetics (1991)
- Website: Homepage of Prof Davidson

David Bruce Davidson (born 1961) is a London-born South African electrical engineer at Curtin University, Perth, Western Australia whose work started in the field of Computational Electromagnetics focussed on the underlying theory and engineering applications of, in particular, finite element methods. In 2012 he was named Fellow of the Institute of Electrical and Electronics Engineers (IEEE) for contributions to computational electromagnetics. He currently leads the engineering team at the Curtin Institute of Radio Astronomy, part of the International Centre for Radio Astronomy Research (ICRAR). His current research interests include computational electromagnetics and engineering electromagnetics for radio astronomy.

== Life and career ==
Davidson was born in 1961 in London. He obtained a B.Eng (cum laude) (1982), B.Eng (Hons) (cum laude) (1983) and M.Eng (cum laude) (1986) at the University of Pretoria. After completing his military conscription in the SANDF he worked at the CSIR in Pretoria, focusing mainly on defence electronics.

In 1988 he was appointed senior lecturer at the Department of Electrical and Electronic Engineering at the University of Stellenbosch. He received his PhD from Stellenbosch University in 1991 with a thesis on parallel processing for computational electromagnetics. In 1992 he was appointed associate professor and from 1996, professor.

During his first sabbatical (January - July 1993) he was a visiting scholar at the University of Arizona, Tucson and worked with Richard Ziolkowski on computational electromagnetics techniques for applications in optics.

During his second sabbatical (January - July 1997) he was the visiting fellow commoner at Trinity College, Cambridge and worked with Ronald Ferrari. He also worked with the electricity utilisation group at the engineering department of Cambridge University, under Ricky Metaxas. The group worked on finite element methods for radio-frequency problems in electromagnetics.

He visited the Delft University of Technology in the Netherlands, where he was hosted by Leo Ligthart as guest professor at the International Research Centre for Telecommunications-Transmission and Radar during his third sabbatical (February - July 2003). He worked on time-domain Finite element method formulations applied to ground-penetrating radar.

In 2009 his sabbatical took him to the University of Manchester.

In 2017 he obtained a D.Eng. from Stellenbosch University.

In 2018 he joined the International Centre for Radio Astronomy Research at Curtin University, Perth, Western Australia. Davidson leads the engineering team at the Curtin Institute of Radio Astronomy with a focus on the international Square Kilometre Array (SKA) radio telescope, as well as the Murchison Widefield Array. They are involved in research as diverse as antenna design and computational electromagnetic simulation and metrology.

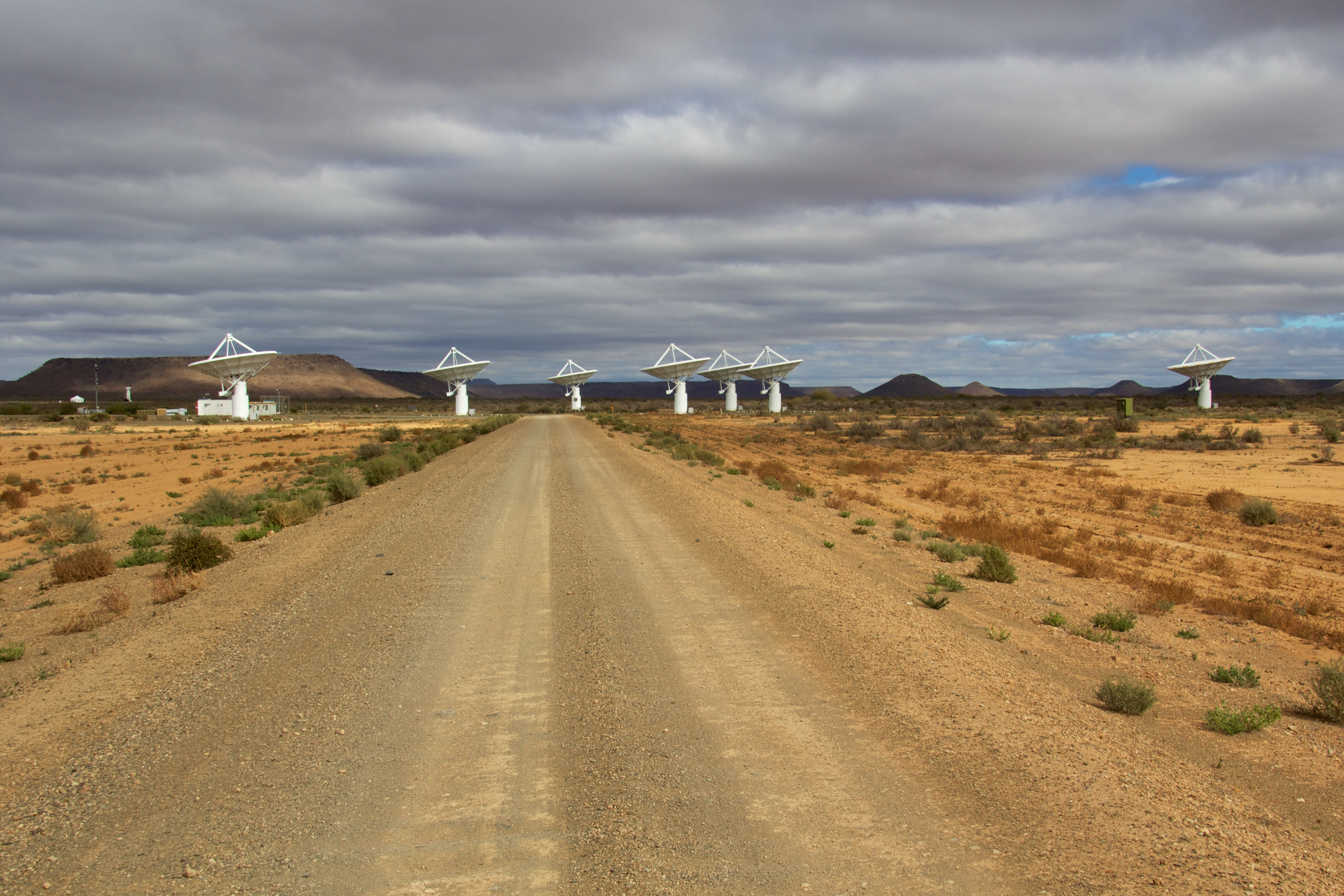
Square Kilometre Array site, South Africa

== Research interests ==
Davidson's initial research interests centred on computational techniques including the method of moments, finite-difference time domain and finite element methods (with major emphasis on the latter). His work was focussed on the underlying theory and engineering applications of the methods.

He was involved in the Computational Engineering special interest group of the National Centre for High Performance Computing. He was also involved in the MeerKAT and SKA projects. He was the principal investigator of the MeerKAT High Performance Computing for Radio Astronomy research project at Stellenbosch University, in collaboration with the University of Cape Town, the Centre for High Performance Computing at the CSIR and the MeerKAT office.

Davidson's research at Curtin University focuses on radio astronomy and in particular on antenna design, computational electromagnetic simulation and metrology; radio frequency front ends; digital back-ends; instrument calibration; and interferometry.

== Works ==
Davidson has published more than 50 journal papers and 100 conference papers (see list of publications below). His book, "Computational Electromagnetics for RF and Microwave Engineering" was published in 2005 with a second edition in 2010.

== Recognition and awards ==
- Foundation for Research Development President's Award (1995)
- National Research Foundation (NRF) Engineering Assessment Committee (2001, 2002, 2006)
- B1 rating from NRF
- Rector's Award for Excellent Research, Stellenbosch University (2005)
- Fellow and senior member of IEEE (2012)
- Member of The Applied Computational and Electromagnetic Society (ACES)
- Member of SAIEEE and chairman 1996-98
- Editor of IEEE Antennas and Propagation Magazine's EM Programmer's Notebook column
- Editor of IEEE Antennas and Propagation letters (2006–2008)
- General chair, 8th International Workshop on Finite Elements for Microwave Engineering (2006)
- Chair of the Local Organising Committee for ICEAA IEEE-APWC (2012)
