= Tony De Nonno =

- Born: January 12, 1947 (age 79)
- Education: New York Institute of Technology
- Occupations: Filmmaker, photographer, puppeteer
- Years active: 1970–present
- Website: http://www.denonnoprodinc.com/

Anthony Joseph De Nonno (born January 12, 1947) is an Italian–American filmmaker, photographer, puppeteer, historian, and speaker in humanities.

== Early life ==
De Nonno was born in Brooklyn, New York to Antoinette (née Carifa) and Jerry De Nonno, two residents of Manhattan's Little Italy neighborhood. His grandparents, Giovanni and Angelina Carifa, owned and operated the Columbia Restaurant on Mulberry Street in Manhattan. His father, Jerry, was a sports columnist and horse racing handicapper who worked at the New York Post from 1927 to 1977. He wrote a daily column called "De Nonno's Picks," which highlighted racing odds at the Aqueduct and Belmont tracks.

De Nonno attended New Utrecht High School and later received a B.F.A. in Communications from the New York Institute of Technology-Manhattan. Around this time, he worked as a copy boy for the New York Post, the newspaper where his father worked.

== Career ==
Between 1970 and 1993, De Nonno has photographed a number of public figures including Muhammad Ali, Tina Turner, Cary Grant, David Bowie, Joan Baez, Bette Midler, The Who, The Rolling Stones, Elvis Presley, Frank Sinatra, and Stevie Wonder. He served as Eric Clapton's 1974 American tour photographer.

Since 1970, De Nonno has written, produced, and directed over 50 short films and documentaries. While studying at NYIT-Manhattan, De Nonno made his first films: El Fang-Dango, a spoof of Dracula, The Kiss of Death, a gangster-film spoof, and It's All in my Hands, a documentary on local shoemaker John Principe. It's All in my Hands was an end-of-year project that cost him $800 (~$4,800 in 2018). De Nonno recalls in an account on Folkstreams: "...Finnish TV acquired the rights to broadcast It's All in My Hands six times over a 2 year period-and paid me exactly $800."

Subjects of his documentaries have included Itzhak Perlman, Anne Akiko Meyers, and Antonio Meucci, as well as senior citizens, physically challenged persons, and family businesses in New York City. Many of his documentaries have aired on ABC, PBS, Bravo, and New York's WLIW. Meucci, in particular, had resonated with De Nonno in his filming of 1992's Antonio Meucci: Father of the Telephone. He would later advocate House Resolution 269 among the U.S. House of Representatives to honor Meucci, which passed on June 11, 2002.

In a recollection of It's All in my Hands on Folkstreams, De Nonno states his ethos on filmmaking:

"At the heart of what I do as a filmmaker...is to mine the essence and core of the individual(s) I am focusing upon and reveal something about him or her, which touches a chord in all of us. I see myself as a storyteller and I love to shine my filmmaker’s eye on the often unspoken and unrecognized “Salt of the Earth” individuals of this world...I am especially determined to honor the legacy and dignity of Italian Americans as well as the heritage and traditions of culturally-diverse people of our great nation."

From 1981, after filming It's One Family: Knock on Wood, he has offered public performances and workshops with a marionette of a knight based on the epic poem Orlando Furioso. De Nonno is a close friend of the film's subjects: the Manteo family of puppeteers versed in the marionette shows of Catania, Sicily. He has also worked as a Senior Security Officer at The New School in Manhattan.

== Reception ==
- Film critic Pauline Kael praised his 1977 documentary, Part of Your Loving, about Italian-born baker Ben Togati: "It's just about impeccable. The camera is always where it should be. The man is treated with affection. And it's very complete. You get a sense of his life." Part of Your Loving was also featured in PBS's The Short List documentary series in 1999.
- Author and Associate Dean of Undergraduate Studies at USC Dornsife Richard Fliegel, who associate produced De Nonno's 1980 segment for ABC's 20/20 on rock band Fleetwood Mac, commented on De Nonno's 1993 Rebuilding the South Bronx, showing its subjects as "people who lived, believed and came together... to save their neighborhood and rebuild it for the future generations."
- CUNY Queens College literary scholar and Italian-American historian Fred Gardaphe praised De Nonno's 2010 Serving Society with Heart: Unico National's 85-Year Contribution to America, saying it "paints an inspiring portrait of UNICO members nation wider and their service and devotion to American society over the last 85 years."
- His 2001 Heaven Touches Brooklyn in July, about the Festa de Giglio (Feast of Lilies, which De Nonno has, in his words, "become obsessed" with) celebrating St. Paulinus of Nola in Williamsburg, was sharply criticized by Joseph Sciorra of the John D. Calandra Italian American Institute at Queens College. Sciorra called the film "extremely problematic and ultimately dishonest," noting numerous historical inconsistencies, derivation from other documentaries (i.e. Jeff Porter's The Men Who Dance The Giglio), and an "exaggerated, overly sentimental, and clumsy script."
- From De Nonno's recollection of It's All in my Hands on Folkstreams:

"Michael Racanelli, director of the Vocational Division of the New York City Department of Education, called it 'An impressive personalized film on working.' Dr. Paul Patane, trustee of the School Art League said 'it awakens young people to the dignity of working with their hands.' Joan Eskenaski of the National Career Counseling and Resource Center cited the film in a review calling it 'A film of feeling and quality...a great vocational guidance film.' Her review inspired librarians across New York State to acquire 16mm prints for their film collection."

== Filmography ==
Year	Title
1970	The Kiss of Death
1971	El Fang-Dango
1972	It's All in my Hands
1977	Part of Your Loving
1979	One Generation Is Not Enough
1980	Moira: A Vision Of Blindness
1980	Fleetwood Mac
1981	The Way of The Wind
1981	It's One Family: Knock on Wood
1982	Itzhak Perlman: In My Case, Music
1982	Dancing's All of You
1983	Anne Akiko Meyers: Beyond The Gift of Music
1983	Just Be Me
1984	Housing With a Heart: The Enterprise Foundation
1985	Just Be Me
1985	Navigation Without Sight
1986	Liberty Minutes
1986	Portraits of Liberty
1987	a3520 For Piano Solo(a composition by Matthias Kriesberg)
1988	Fast and Sexy
1989	A Fistful of Words
1990	Everybody Rejoice
1991	The Morris Magnet School for the Arts
1992	Antonio Meucci: The Father of the Telephone
1993	Rebuilding the South Bronx: The Story of SEBCO
1994	Italian American Visions: Portraits of 20th Century Immigration
1995	An Empowering Partnership
1996–97	The UN in Queens: A Global Celebration
1998	Teaching Technology to the World
2000	Tai Chi and Seniors: A Meditation in Movement
2001–2005	Heaven Touches Brooklyn in July
2003	Teaching Technology to the World
2004	A Gift of Joy
2004	New York City Through Time: The Museum of the City of New York
2004	Public Schools are Everybody's Business
2005	Forming Men for All Seasons
2006	Young People: Building Bridges to a Safer World
2010	John LaCorte: A Monument to History
2010	Serving Society With Heart: UNICO National's 85-Year Contribution to America
2007–2010	From Devastation to Celebration: The South Bronx: A Community Reborn
2007–2010	A Century of Laughter, Heart, and Song: The Art of Italian Comedy in America
