= Sue Marx =

American documentary filmmaker (1930–2023)

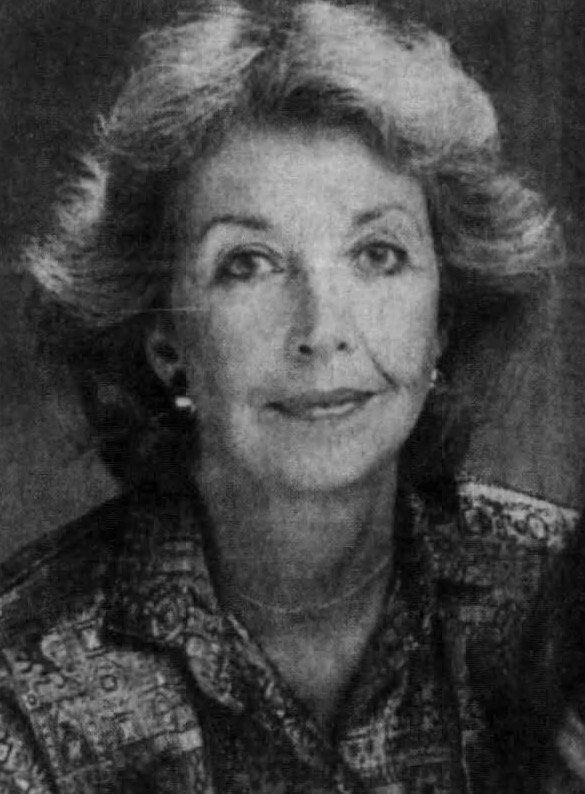
- Born: Suzanne Elaine Gothelf; November 17, 1930; Yonkers, New York, U.S.
- Died: July 17, 2023 (aged 92); Birmingham, Michigan, U.S.
- Occupation(s): Film producer, director
- Notable work: Young at Heart

Suzanne Elaine Marx (née Gothelf; November 17, 1930 – July 17, 2023) was an American documentary film director and producer. She won the Academy Award for Best Documentary Short Film in 1988.

== Early life and education ==
Marx was born in Yonkers, New York, on November 17, 1930, to artist Louis Gothelf and his wife Leona. She grew up in Wisconsin and Indiana and studied at Indiana University Bloomington, where she graduated in 1952. She also received a master of arts in Social Psychology at Wayne State University in 1967.

== Career ==
After college, Marx worked in an advertising agency in Chicago before moving to Detroit. In 1953, she married Stanley "Hank" Marx, a businessman active in the city's cultural scene, and had three daughters with him between 1955 and 1959. She taught English in the Royal Oak school district and earned a master's degree in sociology from Wayne State University. She was also a model, which generated an interest behind the camera. After becoming a freelance photographer, her portraits of Martin Luther King Jr. and Rosa Parks were featured in books and art shows.

In the 1970s, Marx was a news producer for WDIV-TV. In 1980, she established her production company Sue Marx Films, Inc. in Detroit. It made documentaries on life in Detroit. One, Young at Heart, based on her father, won the Academy Award for Best Documentary Short Film in 1988. The film documents the romance of two octogenarians who would later marry: Marx’s widowed artist father, Lou Gothelf, and fellow artist Reva Shwayder.

In 1998, Marx along with Ortheia Barnes, Alto Reed, and Michael Brock of the Dramatics produced a tourism video for the Detroit Convention Bureau titled "It's a Great Time in Detroit".

In 2011, she received the Michigan Filmmaker Award at the Traverse City Film Festival.

== Personal life ==
Marx died at her home in Birmingham, Michigan, on July 17, 2023, at the age of 92.
