= Worm's-eye view =

View of an object or location from below

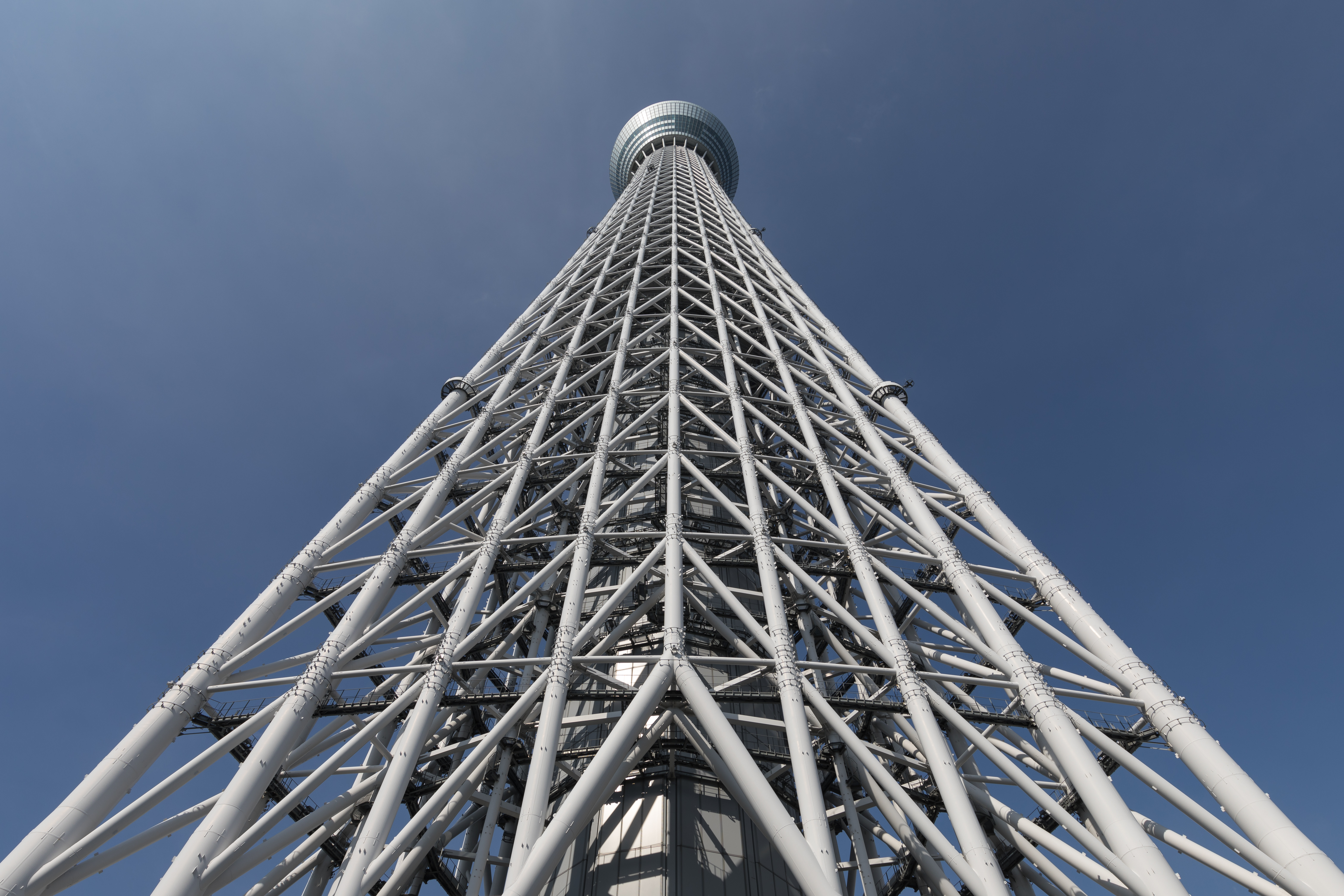
A worm's-eye view of the Tokyo Skytree

A worm's-eye view, also known as a frog's-eye view, is a description of the view of a scene from a very steep, low angle, creating a viewing perspective like that of a hypothetical worm. It is the perspective inverse of a bird's-eye view.

It can give the impression that an object is tall and strong while the viewer is childlike or powerless.

A worm's-eye view commonly uses three-point perspective, with one vanishing point on top, one on the left, and one on the right. The camera's point of view is angled looking up from just above the ground or low on the vertical axis of the shot's composition. With this single point perspective objects will loom and tower above the subject. Objects appear larger than they are. The psychological effect of this camera may encourage feelings of physical vulnerability and smallness.

Examples of a frog's-eye view can be found in the experimental film "How the Frog's Eye Sees" (1984) by animator Skip Battaglia, which includes a soundtrack by Brian Eno. The first examples of a frog's-eye camera view are found in Russian avant-garde photography and filmmaking from the 1920s Constructivist period, the 1930s Socialist-Realist period and World War II.

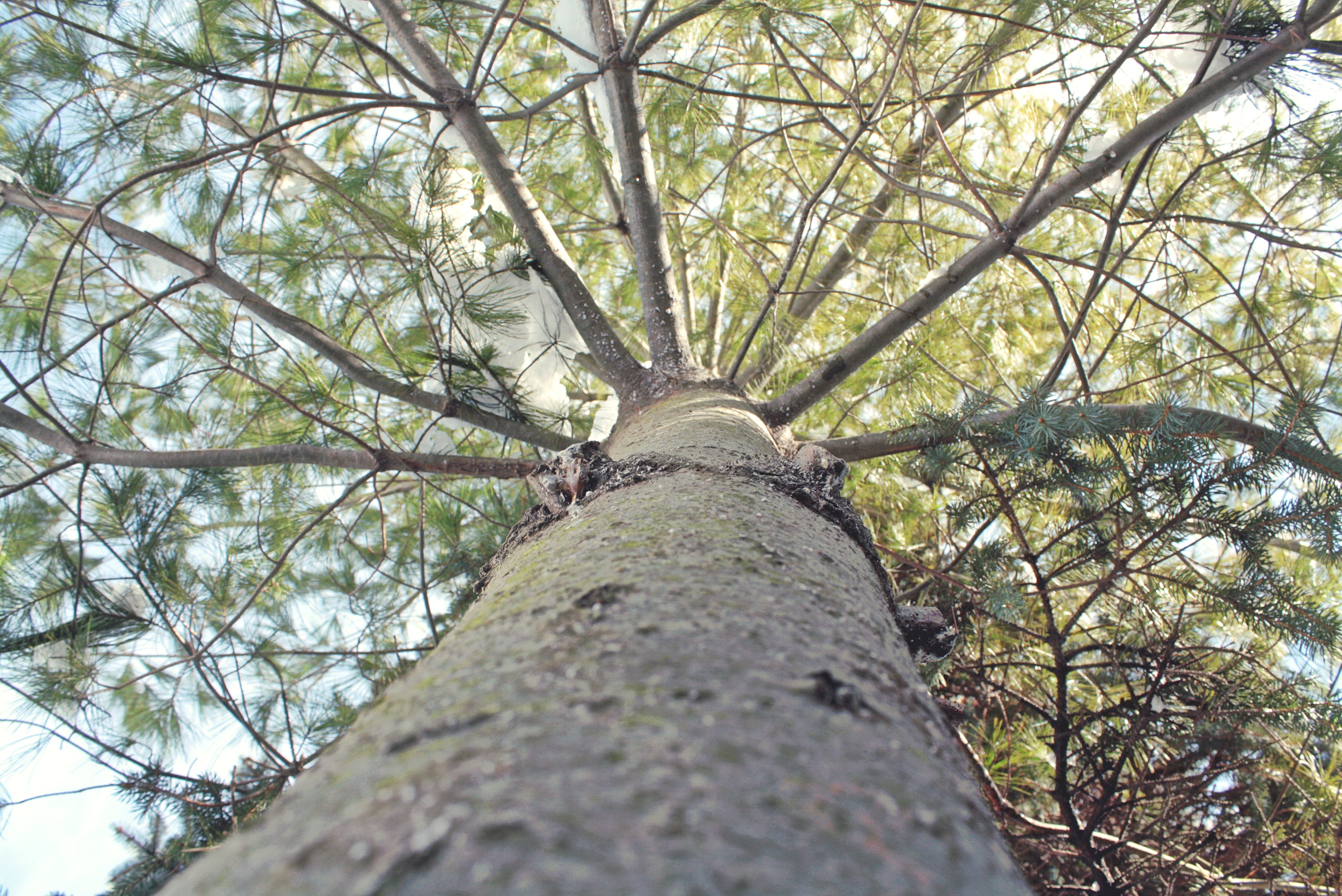
A tree from a worm's-eye view

== See also ==
- Bird's-eye view
- Low-angle shot
- Plan (drawing)
