= Skip Battaglia =

American animator and filmmaker

- Born: Carl Battaglia; April 3, 1948 (age 78); Buffalo, New York, U.S.
- Education: Boston College (B.A.); Syracuse University (M.A.)
- Occupations: Animator; Filmmaker; Educator
- Years active: 1980–present
- Known for: Experimental animated films
- Awards: CINE Golden Eagle; Cannes Film Festival Prix du Jury

Carl F. "Skip" Battaglia (born August 14, 1948) is an American experimental filmmaker and animator.

== Education ==
Battaglia was raised in Buffalo, New York, where he states his introduction to Circle Art in High School changed his life. In 1966 he graduated from St. Joseph's Collegiate Institute. He received his Bachelor of Arts degree in English and Philosophy from Boston College, graduating in 1970. He returned to St. Joseph's Collegiate, and from 1971 to 1973 taught high school English. He received his Master of Arts degree from Syracuse University Newhouse School of Public Communications, graduating in 1974. From 1977 through 1981, he was Adjunct Faculty for the University of Rochester Department of Fine Arts. From 1981 through 1987, he served as associate professor in the Department of Communications and Journalism at St. John Fisher College in Rochester, New York. He currently serves as professor at the Rochester Institute of Technology, where he teaches courses on film language, and other related film and film production courses.

Battaglia's animations range from pencil, and pastel on paper, as well as paint on film. He has won various awards from film festivals around the world, such as in New York City, Canada, Taiwan, New Zealand, and London. His film Parataxis is taught as part of courses on American Expressionism. He is known for his 1980 short film Parataxis and his 1997 music video for the song Taki Dom. He is best known for his experimental and abstract animation, Crossing the Stream. In 2008, the Ottawa International Animation Festival featured a retrospective of Battaglia's work, and also in 2008 his name was added to the St. Joseph's Collegiate Institute Fine Arts Wall of Honor in recognition of his accomplishments.

Always involved with sound design, Battaglia wrote the libretto for "Car Crash Opera" and took it to Michaela Eremiasova and Jairo Duarte-Lopez, then PhD candidates in music composition at the Eastman School of Music, Rochester NY. The three worked on the opera as a soundtrack, and the soundtrack was performed at the 2006 New York Opera Festival. The animated film short (8 min.), "Car Crash Opera," premiered in January 2012. It has won national and international awards for image and sound.

Battaglia retired in 2016. Presently he is working on two animated films: "Local Squalls" (fully animated; sound design) and "Postcards of People Looking at Landscape" (collage).

== Select filmography ==
- Parataxis (1980)
- Boccioni's Bike (1982)
- How the Frog's Eye Sees (1985)
- Pigment Forest (1985)
- Brainstormers (1986)
- Academy Leader Variations (1987)
- Geologic Time (1989)
- The Animated Star-Spangled Banner (1990)
- Restlessness (1994)
- Los ángeles del fin de milenium (1996)
- Taki Dom (1997).
- Second Nature (2000)
- I Would Always Slow the Ocean Down (2001)
- More True Shit (2003)
- Crossing the Stream (2006)
- "Car Crash Opera" (2012)

== Recognition ==
Of Boccioni's Bike, Boston Globe wrote the film "offers the most successful union of imagery and music".

Of How the Frog's Eye Sees, The New York Times called it a "witty look at the flies, fish and plant life that pass through the title creature's field vision".

Of The Animated Star-Spangled Banner, Philadelphia Inquirer wrote "The Animated StarSpangled Banner is just that, the national anthem sung by a chorus of fifth graders" and "given a highly literal cartoon expression", and Pittsburgh Press called it "hip and original", while Washington Times noted the film "takes punning license with the words of the national anthem as they're spoken by a group of fifth-graders." Variety wrote that the film was "inventively animated," with such imagery as the rocket's red glare becoming a line of Rockettes and then changing into an angry Karl Marx.

=== Awards and nominations ===
- 1982, Won CINE Golden Eagle for Boccioni's Bike
- 1984, Won American Film and Video Festival Blue Ribbon for How the Frog's Eyes See
- 1986, Won Animafest World Festival of Animated Films Best Soundtrack for How the Frog's Eyes See
- 1987, Won Cannes Film Festival Prix du Jury for Best Short Film Academy Leader Variations
- 1989, Won New York Exposition of Independent Film Best animation for Geologic Time
- 1989, Won Ann Arbor Film Festival Best animation for Geologic Time
- 2000, Won International Animated Film Association Charles Samu Award for Second Nature
- 2006, Won International Animated Film Association ASIFA award for Best Animation for Crossing the Stream
- 2007, Won Black Maria Film Festival Director's Citation for Crossing the Stream
