= Jim Dine: A Self-Portrait on the Walls =

1995 film

- Produced by: Nancy Dine; Richard Stilwell
- Cinematography: Rüdiger Kortz
- Edited by: Maro Chermayeff
- Production companies: Outside In July, Inc.
- Distributed by: University of California Extension Center for Media and Independent Learning
- Release date: 1995
- Running time: 28 min
- Country: United States
- Language: English

Jim Dine: A Self-Portrait on the Walls is a 1995 American short documentary film about artist Jim Dine produced by Nancy Dine and Richard Stilwell. It was nominated for an Academy Award for Best Documentary Short.

== Overview ==
The film presents the artist in the context of the gallery as the studio. It allows the viewers to follow along as he builds his work on the walls of a gallery in Ludwigsburg, Germany. Art students benefit from it because they learn the obstacles an artist faces when working with a medium larger than the Canson Biggie art pad, and the frustrations Mr. Dine had to face when making an image larger than life.

The narrator explains how the gallery that invited Mr. Dine to present his work could not afford to bring his finished pieces, so they commissioned him instead to simply recreate his images on their walls.

The film then follows him along as he pushes himself and an assistant to meet a six-day deadline. He uses the medium of charcoal to compose portraits not only of himself but of various birds. It shows how broad, sweeping strokes must be employed; how the artist must scale a ten-foot ladder for sake of a few deliberate strokes and then step back down to view it from ground level. The film demonstrates how the artist can correct one section of the image without tearing down the whole wall. The student can observe makeshift tools being created as the artist tapes blocks of charcoal to the end of a staff and 'whacks' it against the wall as he tries to achieve the look of a certain stroke. At other times the artist uses soft strokes with his palm, or a piece of bread. The viewer gets to see how tedious the work is, how abusive the charcoal is to a person's skin and hands, how personal-protective-equipment must be worn. It is a tenacious insight to the world behind the finished product; how an artist must often suffer for sake of his artform.

Mr. Dine is at times seen as being arrogant, for which he makes apology near the end of the film. However, the viewer will by that point completely sympathize with what intense pressure he was under during the filming, not only to meet the deadline but to have the works look masterful and to simultaneously have a cinematographer watching over his every move.

The final punishment the artist had to endure was at the end of the gallery's six-week event. At that point, all of his works were destroyed: the masterfully created pieces were all washed off the walls and painted over. Time for the works of the next artist to be presented.
