= David Davidson (film director) =

American film director

- Born: David Glenn Davidson; February 15, 1953 (age 73); Chicago, Illinois, U.S.
- Education: University of Illinois; New York University
- Occupations: Director, producer
- Years active: 1977–present
- Spouse: Dinah Quayle Davidson

David Davidson (born February 15, 1953) is an American film director. His films, focusing primarily on music, the arts and African-American culture have been broadcast nationally on PBS and on international television. He is best known for A Place Out of Time: The Bordentown School, and HANS RICHTER: Everything Turns – Everything Revolves.

== Early life and education ==
Davidson was born on the South Side of Chicago in 1953. His family later moved to Washington DC, Philadelphia, Rochester, New York; and eventually returned to the Southern Suburbs of Chicago, where he graduated from high school. At that time, Davidson's father passed his 16mm Bolex camera on to him and he started experimenting with film. Davidson studied at The University of Illinois, initially majoring in Political Science before switching to an independent study degree program in Film under Julius Rascheff and photography with Art Sinsabaugh. After earning his BA, Davidson worked as a news photographer for WCIA Television. In 1978, he was accepted into the NYU Graduate Institute of Film and Television, where he received The Warner Fellowship.
