= Greatest Hits: 1980–1994 =

1994 greatest hits album by Aretha Franklin

Greatest hits album by Aretha Franklin
- Released: March 1994
- Recorded: 1980–1994
- Genre: R&B; rock; pop
- Length: 71:13
- Label: Arista

Aretha Franklin chronology
Queen of Soul: The Atlantic Recordings (1992)	Greatest Hits: 1980–1994 (1994)	The Very Best of Aretha Franklin, Vol. 1 (1994)

Professional ratings
Review scores
Source	Rating
AllMusic	3/5 stars
Billboard	(favorable)
Robert Christgau	A
Music Week	3/5 stars
NME	5/10
Select	2/5 medals
Smash Hits	2/5 stars

Greatest Hits: 1980–1994 is the RIAA Platinum-certified first greatest hits album released by American singer Aretha Franklin since she signed with Arista Records in 1980. It compiles her hits from 1980's Aretha through her most recent album at the time: 1991's What You See Is What You Sweat. The album was released in March 1994. Songs from her two albums Love All the Hurt Away (1981) and Through the Storm (1989) were not included on the greatest hits album.

The album includes three new recordings, her rendition of "A Deeper Love", "Willing to Forgive", and "Honey", all of which were released as singles.

== Track listing ==
No.	Title	Writer(s)	Producer(s)	Length
1.	"Freeway of Love" (from Who's Zoomin' Who?, 1985)	Narada Michael Walden; Jeffrey Cohen	N. Walden	5:52
2.	"I Knew You Were Waiting (For Me)" (Duet with George Michael, from Aretha, 1986)	Simon Climie; Dennis Morgan	N. Walden	4:00
3.	"Jump to It" (from Jump to It, 1982)	Luther Vandross; Marcus Miller	Vandross	4:14
4.	"Willing to Forgive"	Babyface; Daryl Simmons	Babyface; Simmons	4:14
5.	"Doctor's Orders" (Duet with Luther Vandross, from What You See Is What You Sweat, 1991)	Vandross; Hubert Eaves, III	Vandross	4:34
6.	"United Together" (from Aretha, 1980)	Chuck Jackson; Phil Perry	Jackson	5:02
7.	"Who's Zoomin' Who" (from Who's Zoomin' Who?, 1985)	N. Walden; Preston Glass; Aretha Franklin	N. Walden	4:43
8.	"A Deeper Love"	David Cole; Robert Clivillés	C+C Music Factory	4:34
9.	"Honey"	Babyface	L.A. Reid; Babyface; Simmons	4:14
10.	"Get It Right" (from Get It Right, 1983)	Vandross; Miller	Vandross	4:15
11.	"Another Night" (from Who's Zoomin' Who?, 1985)	Roy Freeland; Beppe Cantarelli	N. Walden	4:30
12.	"Ever Changing Times" (Duet with Michael McDonald, from What You See Is What You Sweat, 1991)	Burt Bacharach; Bill Conti; Carole Bayer Sager	Bacharach; Sager	4:53
13.	"Jimmy Lee" (from Aretha, 1986)	N. Walden; Cohen; Glass; Anukampa Lisa Walden	N. Walden	5:45
14.	"(You Make Me Feel Like) A Natural Woman (Live)" (Duet with Bonnie Raitt and Gloria Estefan)	Gerry Goffin; Carole King; Jerry Wexler	Ken Ehrlich	4:26
15.	"I Dreamed a Dream" (from What You See Is What You Sweat, 1991)	Claude-Michel Schönberg; Alain Boublil; Jean Marc Natel; Herbert Kretzmer	David "Pic" Conley	4:18

Greatest Hits: 1980–1994 – Non-US editions
No.	Title	Writer(s)	Producer(s)	Length
16.	"Jumpin' Jack Flash" (from Aretha, 1986)	Mick Jagger; Keith Richards	Richards	5:10

== Charts ==
=== Weekly charts ===
Chart (1994)	Peak position
European Albums (Music & Media)	61
German Albums (Offizielle Top 100)	75
Swiss Albums (Schweizer Hitparade)	34
UK Albums (OCC)	27
US Billboard 200	85
US Top R&B/Hip-Hop Albums (Billboard)	23

=== Year-end charts ===
Chart (1994)	Position
US Top R&B/Hip-Hop Albums (Billboard)	56

== Certifications and sales ==
Region	Certification	Certified units/sales
United Kingdom (BPI)	Silver	60,000^{*}
United States (RIAA)	Platinum	1,000,000^{^}
^{*} Sales figures based on certification alone.^{^} Shipments figures based on certification alone.
