= Jewels in the Crown: All-Star Duets with the Queen =

2007 compilation album by Aretha Franklin

Compilation album by Aretha Franklin
- Released: November 12, 2007 (US); July 5, 2008 (UK)
- Recorded: 1980–2007
- Genre: R&B, soul, pop
- Length: 63:05
- Label: Arista

Aretha Franklin chronology
So Damn Happy (2003)	Jewels in the Crown: All-Star Duets with the Queen (2007)	This Christmas, Aretha (2008)

Professional ratings
Review scores
Source	Rating
Allmusic	3/5 stars
Rolling Stone	3.5/5 stars

Jewels in the Crown: All-Star Duets with the Queen is a compilation album by American singer Aretha Franklin. It was released by Arista on November 12, 2007, in the United States. The album comprises a combination of classic duets spanning Franklin's career, and two newly recorded duets with Fantasia and John Legend, also containing two live duets, one from 1993, the other from 1998. The album concludes with a previously released rendition of "Nessun Dorma", of which Franklin had performed a version at the Grammy Awards of 1998, when she filled in last minute for Luciano Pavarotti.

The album peaked at #54 on the Billboard 200 album chart and reached number seven on the Top R&B/Hip-Hop Albums chart, her first to reach the top ten since 1998. The disc's first and only single, "Put You Up on Game", featuring Fantasia was released to radio on October 1, 2007. The single peaked at number 41 on the US Hot R&B/Hip-Hop Songs but missed the Pop chart. The song peaked at number ten on the Adult R&B Songs and earned the pair an NAACP Image Award nomination in the Outstanding Duo or Group category.

== Track listing ==
No.	Title	Writer(s)	Producer(s)	Length
1.	"Jumpin' Jack Flash" (Duet with Keith Richards, from Aretha, 1986)	Mick Jagger; Keith Richards	Richards	5:08
2.	"Sisters Are Doin' It for Themselves" (Duet with Eurythmics, from Who's Zoomin' Who?, 1985)	Annie Lennox; David A. Stewart	Stewart	5:53
3.	"I Knew You Were Waiting (For Me)" (Duet with George Michael, from Aretha, 1986)	Dennis Morgan; Simon Climie	Narada Michael Walden	4:03
4.	"What Now My Love" (Duet with Frank Sinatra, from Duets, 1993)	Gilbert Francis Becaud; Pierre Delanoe; Carl Sigman	Phil Ramone	3:16
5.	"Put You Up on Game" (Duet with Fantasia)	Harvey Mason Jr.; Damon Thomas; Steve Russell; Antonio Dixon; Kaleena Harper; Larry Jackson	The Underdogs	4:16
6.	"What Y'all Came to Do" (Duet with John Legend)	Devon Harris; John Stephens; Isaac Hayes; David Porter	Devo Springsteen	3:17
7.	"Never Gonna Break My Faith" (Duet with Mary J. Blige, featuring The Harlem Boys Choir)	Bryan Adams; Eliot Kennedy; Andrea Remanda	The Underdogs; Adams	4:17
8.	"Through the Storm" (Duet with Elton John, from Through the Storm, 1989)	Albert Hammond; Diane Warren	Walden	4:26
9.	"It Isn't, It Wasn't, It Ain't Never Gonna Be" (Duet with Whitney Houston, from Through the Storm, 1989)	Hammond; Warren	Walden	4:52
10.	"(You Make Me Feel Like) A Natural Woman (Live)" (Duet with Bonnie Raitt & Gloria Estefan, from Greatest Hits: 1980–1994, 1994)	Gerald Goffin; Carole King; Gerald Wexler	Ken Ehrlich	4:40
11.	"Doctor's Orders" (Duet with Luther Vandross, from What You See Is What You Sweat, 1991)	Hubert Barclay Eaves III; Luther R. Vandross	Vandross	4:34
12.	"Everchanging Times" (Duet with Michael McDonald, from What You See Is What You Sweat, 1991)	Burt Bacharach; William Conti; Carole Bayer Sager	Bacharach; Sager	5:12
13.	"Chain of Fools (Live)" (Duet with Mariah Carey, from VH1 Divas Live, 1998)	Donald Covay	Sean Murphy	3:12
14.	"Don't Waste Your Time" (Duet with Mary J. Blige, from Mary, 1999)	Josh Ruben; Denise Rich	Babyface	4:11
15.	"Love All the Hurt Away" (Duet with George Benson, from Love All the Hurt Away, 1981)	Sam L. Dees	Arif Mardin	4:21
16.	"Nessun dorma (Live)" (Duet with The New York Recording Orchestra, from the MusiCares event honoring Luciano Pavarotti, Feb. 23, 1998)	Giacomo Puccini	Ramone	3:20

== Charts ==
=== Weekly charts ===
Chart (2007)	Peak position
US Billboard 200	54
US Top R&B/Hip-Hop Albums (Billboard)	7

=== Year-end charts ===
Chart (2008)	Position
US Top R&B/Hip-Hop Albums (Billboard)	89
