= Greatest Hits (Aretha Franklin album) =

1998 greatest hits album by Aretha Franklin

Greatest hits album by Aretha Franklin
- Released: November 2, 1998
- Recorded: 1967–1998
- Genre: R&B
- Label: Global TV

Aretha Franklin chronology
This Is Jazz, Vol. 34 (1998)	Greatest Hits (1998)	So Damn Happy (2003)

Greatest Hits is a 1998 Aretha Franklin compilation. It, along with 2001's Aretha's Best, are the only greatest hits compilations that cover both her hits on Atlantic Records (1967–1979) and Arista Records (1980–1998).

== Track listing ==
Disc 1

1. "I Knew You Were Waiting (For Me)" (with George Michael)
2. "Respect"
3. "I Say a Little Prayer"
4. "Think"
5. "(You Make Me Feel Like) A Natural Woman"
6. "I Never Loved a Man (The Way I Love You)"
7. "You're All I Need to Get By"
8. "Chain of Fools"
9. "Spanish Harlem"
10. "Angel"
11. "Let It Be"
12. "Until You Come Back to Me (That's What I'm Gonna Do)"
13. "Son of a Preacher Man"
14. "Don't Play That Song (You Lied)"
15. "Rock Steady"
16. "See Saw"
17. "Ain't Nothing Like The Real Thing"
18. "Do Right Woman, Do Right Man"
19. "Save Me"
20. "The House That Jack Built"
21. "People Get Ready"
22. "Day Dreaming"

Disc 2

1. "Sisters Are Doing It for Themselves" (with the Eurythmics)
2. "A Deeper Love"
3. "What a Fool Believes"
4. "Who's Zoomin' Who"
5. "Willing to Forgive"
6. "Jumpin' Jack Flash"
7. "Freeway of Love"
8. "Border Song (Holy Moses)"
9. "Oh No Not My Baby"
10. "Call Me"
11. "Ain't No Way"
12. "(Sweet Sweet Baby) Since You've Been Gone"
13. "Baby I Love You"
14. "The Long and Winding Road"
15. "Today I Sing the Blues"
16. "Love All The Hurt Away" (with George Benson)
17. "It Isn't, It Wasn't, It Ain't Never Gonna Be" (with Whitney Houston)
18. "Through The Storm" (with Elton John)
19. "A Rose Is Still a Rose"

== Certifications and sales ==
Region	Certification	Certified units/sales
United Kingdom (BPI)	Gold	100,000^{^}
^{^} Shipments figures based on certification alone.
