= A Rose Is Still a Rose =

1998 studio album by Aretha Franklin

Studio album by Aretha Franklin
- Released: March 24, 1998
- Recorded: 1997
- Studio: Chung King Studios (New York, NY); Vanguard Recording Complex (Oak Park, MI); Bosstown Recording Studios (Atlanta, GA); Doppler Studios (Atlanta, GA); Silent Sound Studios (Atlanta, GA); Southern Tracks (Atlanta, GA); Studio LaCoCo (Atlanta, GA); Krosswire Studios (Atlanta, GA); Woodland Digital (Nashville, TN); Homesite 13 (Novato, CA); Tarpan Studios (San Rafael, CA)
- Genre: R&B; soul
- Length: 51:38
- Label: Arista
- Producer: Clive Davis (exec.); Dallas Austin; Louis Biancaniello; Sean Combs; Jermaine Dupri; James Fischer; Erik "E-Smooth" Hicks; Lauryn Hill; Michael J. Powell; Cory Rooney; Manuel Seal, Jr.; Daryl Simmons; Narada Michael Walden

Aretha Franklin chronology
Greatest Hits: 1980–1994 (1994)	A Rose Is Still a Rose (1998)	Greatest Hits (1998)

Singles from A Rose Is Still a Rose
- 1. "A Rose Is Still a Rose" Released: February 10, 1998; 2. "Here We Go Again" Released: June 16, 1998

A Rose Is Still a Rose is the thirty-fourth studio album by American recording artist Aretha Franklin. It was released on March 24, 1998, by Arista Records. Conceived after a longer hiatus and a complete departure from her previous studio album What You See Is What You Sweat (1991), the album includes influences of 1990s hip hop as well as modern-day contemporary R&B and soul music. Throughout the project, Franklin worked with many famed hip hop producers and rappers, such as Lauryn Hill, Sean "Puffy" Combs, Jermaine Dupri, and Daryl Simmons. With the latter acts producing most of the album, A Rose Is Still a Rose deviated from the adult contemporary sound of Franklin's older work.

Most critics praised the album, calling it a return to form for Franklin and ranking it alongside her best late career albums. A Rose Is Still a Rose was nominated for a Grammy Award for Best R&B Album, while its title track earned Franklin her fifth nomination in the Best Female R&B Vocal Performance category. Commercially, the album peaked at number 30 on the US Billboard 200, her highest peak since Who's Zoomin' Who? (1985), and reached the top 40 in Norway, Sweden, and Switzerland. Franklin's biggest commercial success of the 1990s, A Rose Is Still a Rose was certified gold by the RIAA and would remain her final album to earn a certification in the United States.

== Background ==
In 1991, Franklin released her thirty-sixth studio album What You See Is What You Sweat. A moderate commercial success throughout Europe, particularly in Scandinavia, it became a commercial failure in the United States, peaking at number 153 on the US Billboard 200 and dropping off the charts after seven weeks only. While Franklin remained active the following years, providing songs on film soundtracks such as Malcolm X (1992), Sister Act 2: Back in the Habit (1993) and Waiting to Exhale (1995) and releasing her first compilation album of her Arista Records tenure in 1994, Greatest Hits: 1980–1994, which included two new singles produced by Babyface, no new full-length studio album was completed.

Following a string of ill-fated adult contemporary albums, featuring chief production from Narada Michael Walden, Luther Vandross, and others who had helped in revitalizing her career in the 1980s, Franklin envisioned a complete departure from her previous projects for her eleventh album with Arista. It was label head Clive Davis who suggested Franklin to align herself with a contingent of contemporary musicians from the R&B and hip hop scene, who would add to Franklin's soulful foundation without radically detracting it and try to re-connect her with a new audience that was embracing neo soul and hip hop soul artists such as Mariah Carey, Mary J. Blige, Erykah Badu and The Fugees. Davis would become instrumental in consulting producers and songwriters to work with Franklin, including both established and upcoming musicians such as Lauryn Hill, Sean "Puffy" Combs, Dallas Austin, Jermaine Dupri, and Daryl Simmons.

== Critical reception ==
Professional ratings
Review scores
Source	Rating
AllMusic	4/5 stars
Robert Christgau	A
Entertainment Weekly	B+
Rolling Stone	4/5 stars
The Source	Favorable
Vibe	Favorable

A Rose Is Still a Rose received generally favorable reviews from music critics who complimented Franklin on her decision to adapt a younger sound following the adult contemporary material on her previous albums. Time magazine called the album "one of the five best albums of the year", declaring it "Franklin's most rewarding album in more than two decades." The Village Voice journalist Robert Christgau gave A Rose Is Still a Rose an A rating and noted that "none of these 11 songs aspires to the declarative tunes and pungent phrases of the soul era, and at 55 Aretha is losing her high end. But after a decade in artistic seclusion, she had something to prove, and she did – with an album as audacious and accomplished as such great Wexlers as Spirit in the Dark or Young, Gifted and Black." Giving the album four stars out of four, USA Today critic Steve Jones wrote, “with the first note of A Rose Is Still a Rose, Franklin serves notice that her 30-year reign as Queen of Soul isn't about to end. After all this time, this rose remains in full bloom."

AllMusic editor Stephen Thomas Erlewine found that "the most notable element of the album is that Franklin collaborates with fresh talent, all of whom are either prominent rap figures or at least fluent in hip-hop [...] which is the last thing most observers would have expected from Franklin in 1997." While he was critical of Sean "Puffy" Combs's material, he felt that her other collaborations worked "because they find Franklin sounding vital, which is something that has not happened throughout the '90s." In his review for Rolling Stone, James Hunter wrote that "with the limited exception of Walden's songs, A Rose Is Still a Rose leaves behind Franklin's overly dogmatic eighties work. It's subtle and sexy, a miraculous immersion in hip-hop gravity, flow and humor by one of pop music's greatest living singers. It never forgets that, yes, Aretha can rock the house, but what she really excels at is mood. This is what becomes a legend most." Jeremy Helligar, writing for Entertainment Weekly, found that the album had "an unusual bloom. On tunes like ”Every Lil’ Bit Hurts” and ”Never Leave You Again,” co-producers Combs, Jermaine Dupri, Lauryn Hill, and others help Franklin recapture a gutsy urgency long missing from her records, earning her respect once more." He gave the album a B+ rating.

== Commercial performance ==
Issued in March 1998, A Rose Is Still a Rose debuted at number 30 on the US Billboard 200 and number 7 on Billboard's Top R&B/Hip-Hop Albums chart. This marked Franklin's highest debut position yet as well as her highest peak since 1985's Who's Zoomin' Who?. A steady seller, the album sold 294,000 copies within its first five months of release and was, soon after, certified gold by the Recording Industry Association of America (RIAA) in August 1998, indicating sales in excess of more than 500,000 units. Her biggest commercial success of the 1990s, A Rose Is Still a Rose would remain Franklin's final album to earn a RIAA certification in the United States. Elsewhere, A Rose Is Still a Rose entered the top forty of the charts it appeared on but was less successful than previous releases. The album debuted and peaked at number 29 on the Swedish Albums Chart, and reached number 32 and number 36 in Norway and Switzerland, becoming her lowest-charting album since 1983's Get It Right on all three markets.

A Rose Is Still a Rose produced two singles, led by its same-titled lead single. Franklin's highest-charting single in four years, it peaked at number 26 on the US Billboard Hot 100 and reached number 22 on the UK Singles Chart, marking Franklin's last top 40 hit on both markets until her death in 2018. In addition, "A Rose Is Still a Rose" topped Billboard's Dance Club Songs chart and peaked at number five on the Hot R&B/Hip-Hop Songs. Follow-up "Here We Go Again" also reached number one on Billboard's Dance Club Songs.

== Track listing ==
Credits adapted from the liner notes of A Rose Is Still a Rose.

A Rose Is Still a Rose track listing
No.	Title	Writer(s)	Producer(s)	Length
1.	"A Rose Is Still a Rose"	Lauryn Hill; Edie Brickell; Brad Houser; Brandon Aly; John W. Bush; Kenny Withrow	Lauryn Hill	4:27
2.	"Never Leave You Again"	Sean Combs; Kelly Price; Cory Rooney	Sean "Puffy" Combs; Cory Rooney	4:36
3.	"In Case You Forgot"	Bill Dickens; Tim Gant; Michael Gray	Daryl Simmons	4:49
4.	"Here We Go Again"	Troy Lee Broussard; Trina Broussard; Jermaine Dupri; Trey Lorenz; Mauro Malavasi; David Romani; Wayne Garfield	Jermaine Dupri; Manuel Seal	3:30
5.	"Every Lil' Bit Hurts"	Dupri; Stephanie Cooke; Manuel Seal	Dupri; Seal	4:07
6.	"In the Morning"	Daryl Simmons	Simmons	4:56
7.	"I'll Dip"	Dallas Austin	Dallas Austin	4:06
8.	"How Many Times"	David Foster; Gregory Charley; John Winston	Narada Michael Walden; Louis Biancaniello	4:21
9.	"Watch My Back"	Norman West	Walden; Erik "E Smooth" Hicks; James Fischer	4:45
10.	"Love Pang"	Mira Waters; Nancy Wilson	Michael J. Powell	4:20
11.	"The Woman"	Aretha Franklin	Powell; Aretha Franklin	7:41

Additional notes

- Production for "In Case You Forgot" and "In the Morning" is coordinated by Ivy Skoff
- Production for "How Many Times" and "Watch My Back" are coordinated by Kevin Walden, Cherise Miller, Janice Lee & Shiloh Hobel

== Charts ==
=== Weekly charts ===
Chart (1998)	Peak position
Austrian Albums (Ö3 Austria)	46
European Albums (Music & Media)	67
French Albums (SNEP)	59
Norwegian Albums (VG-lista)	32
Swedish Albums (Sverigetopplistan)	29
Swiss Albums (Schweizer Hitparade)	36
US Billboard 200	30
US Top R&B/Hip-Hop Albums (Billboard)	7

=== Year-end charts ===
Chart (1998)	Position
US Top R&B/Hip-Hop Albums (Billboard)	85

== Certifications ==
Region	Certification	Certified units/sales
United States (RIAA)	Gold	500,000^{^}
^{^} Shipments figures based on certification alone.
