= No Stone Unturned =

1973 compilation album by the Rolling Stones

Compilation album by The Rolling Stones
- Released: 5 October 1973
- Recorded: 1963–68
- Genre: Rock
- Label: Decca
- Producer: Andrew Loog Oldham

The Rolling Stones compilations chronology
Goats Head Soup (1973)	No Stone Unturned (1973)	It's Only Rock 'n Roll (1974)

Professional ratings
Review scores
Source	Rating
AllMusic	3/5 stars

No Stone Unturned is a compilation album by the Rolling Stones released in 1973. Eight of the twelve tracks had been previously released on single B-sides in the United Kingdom, and the rest had been released on EPs.

The song "Sad Day" was released as a single from the album.

Neither the album or the single "Sad Day" were released with consent from the band, who had lost control over their pre-1971 catalogue when they terminated their contract with Decca Records. Decca would continue to release such unauthorized albums over the next several decades.

== Track listing ==
All songs composed by Mick Jagger and Keith Richards except as noted.

Side one
No.	Title	Writer(s)	Original release(s)	Length
1.	"Poison Ivy" (version 2)	Jerry Leiber, Mike Stoller	UK – The Rolling Stones (EP) (1964); US – More Hot Rocks (Big Hits & Fazed Cookies) (1972)	2:06
2.	"The Singer Not the Song"		UK – B-side of "Get Off of My Cloud" (1965); US – December's Children (And Everybody's) (1965)	2:24
3.	"Surprise Surprise"		UK – The Lord's Taverners Charity Album (1965); US – The Rolling Stones, Now! (1965)	2:33
4.	"Child of the Moon"		UK & US – B-side of "Jumpin' Jack Flash" (1968) / More Hot Rocks (Big Hits & Fazed Cookies) (1972)	3:11
5.	"Stoned"	Nanker Phelge	UK – B-side of "I Wanna Be Your Man" (1963); US – no previous release	2:09
6.	"Sad Day"		UK – no previous release US – B-side of "19th Nervous Breakdown" (1966)	3:03

Side two
No.	Title	Writer(s)	Original release(s)	Length
1.	"Money"	Berry Gordy Jr., Janie Bradford	UK – The Rolling Stones (EP) (1964); US – More Hot Rocks (Big Hits & Fazed Cookies) (1972)	2:32
2.	"Congratulations"		UK – no previous release US – B-side of "Time Is on My Side (organ intro version)" (1964) / 12 X 5 (1964)	2:30
3.	"I'm Moving On" (live)	Hank Snow	UK – Got Live If You Want It! (EP) (1965); US – December's Children (And Everybody's) (1965)	2:12
4.	"2120 South Michigan Avenue" (short version)	Nanker Phelge	UK – Five by Five (EP) (1964); US – 12 X 5 (1964)	2:07
5.	"Long, Long While"		UK – B-side to "Paint It Black" (1966); US – More Hot Rocks (Big Hits & Fazed Cookies) (1972)	3:01
6.	"Who's Driving Your Plane?"		UK & US – B-side of "Have You Seen Your Mother, Baby, Standing in the Shadow?" (1966)	3:13

== Digital release ==
No Stone Unturned Vol. 1 & Vol. 2

Compilation album by the Rolling Stones
- Released: 18 June 2013
- Recorded: 1963 – 1970
- Genre: Rock
- Length: 127:34
- Label: ABKCO
- Producers: Andrew Loog Oldham, The Rolling Stones, Jimmy Miller

In 2013, ABKCO included No Stone Unturned Vol. 1 and No Stone Unturned Vol. 2 in their comprehensive iTunes digital release The Rolling Stones 1963-1971. As that release focused on the UK album configurations, the two volumes included 43 "singles, B sides and more" not included in the original UK studio albums and EPs, including many of their biggest hits, which were often contained in their US album counterparts, e.g. "(I Can't Get No) Satisfaction" on Out of Our Heads, "Paint It Black" on Aftermath and "Let's Spend the Night Together" on Between the Buttons.

The digital release of No Stone Unturned was designed in a similar fashion to The Beatles' Past Masters compilations: to supplement the band's UK albums and EPs to make a "Complete Collection Box Set" of the entire studio output of the band owned by ABKCO. Thus, four songs from the 1973 release were not included because they didn't meet this criterion:

1. "Poison Ivy (version 2)" – included on The Rolling Stones (EP), the much rarer version 1 was included instead
2. "Money" – included on The Rolling Stones (EP)
3. "I'm Moving On (live)" – live song from Got Live If You Want It! (EP), no live tracks were included
4. "2120 South Michigan Avenue (short version)" – an edit of the long version included on 12 x 5

No Stone Unturned Vol. 1 and No Stone Unturned Vol. 2 were later released separately on the 7digital service. Similar to Hot Rocks 1964-1971, the collection ends with "Brown Sugar" and "Wild Horses" since ABKCO holds dual copyright ownership in conjunction with The Rolling Stones for those two songs.

=== Track listing ===
All songs by Mick Jagger and Keith Richards, except where noted.

Vol. 1
No.	Title	Original release(s)	Length
1.	"Fortune Teller" (Naomi Neville)	UK – various artists LP Saturday Club (1964); US – More Hot Rocks (Big Hits & Fazed Cookies) (1972)	2:19
2.	"Poison Ivy (version 1)" (Jerry Leiber, Mike Stoller)	UK – various artists LP Saturday Club (1964); US – More Hot Rocks (Big Hits & Fazed Cookies) (1972)	2:37
3.	"Come On" (Chuck Berry)	UK – A-side (1963) / Big Hits (High Tide and Green Grass) (1966); US – More Hot Rocks (Big Hits & Fazed Cookies) (1972)	1:49
4.	"I Want to Be Loved" (Willie Dixon)	UK – B-side of "Come On" (1963); US – Singles Collection: The London Years (1989)	1:52
5.	"I Wanna Be Your Man" (John Lennon, Paul McCartney)	UK – A-side (1963) / Milestones (1972); US – B-side of "Not Fade Away" (1964)	1:43
6.	"Stoned" (Nanker Phelge)	UK – B-side of "I Wanna Be Your Man" (1963); US – Singles Collection: The London Years (1989)	2:09
7.	"Not Fade Away" (Charles Hardin, Norman Petty)	UK – A-side (1964) / Big Hits (High Tide and Green Grass) (1966); US – A-side (1964) / The Rolling Stones (England's Newest Hit Makers) (1964)	1:47
8.	"It's All Over Now" (Bobby Womack, Shirley Womack)	UK – A-side (1964) / Big Hits (High Tide and Green Grass) (1966); US – 12 X 5 (1964)	3:27
9.	"Good Times, Bad Times"	UK – B-side of "It's All Over Now"; US – 12 X 5 (1964)	2:32
10.	"Time Is on My Side (organ intro version)" (Jerry Ragovoy)	US – A-side (1964) / 12 X 5 (1964)	2:53
11.	"Congratulations"	UK – Singles Collection: The London Years (1989); US – B-side of "Time Is on My Side (organ intro version)" (1964) / 12 X 5 (1964)	2:30
12.	"Look What You've Done" (McKinley Morganfield)	UK – Stone Age (1971); US – December's Children (And Everybody's) (1965)	2:17
13.	"Little Red Rooster" (Willie Dixon)	UK – A-side (1964); US – The Rolling Stones, Now! (1965)	3:07
14.	"Everybody Needs Somebody to Love (short version)" (Solomon Burke, Bert Berns, Jerry Wexler)	US – The Rolling Stones, Now! (1965)	2:59
15.	"Surprise Surprise"	UK – The Lord's Taverners Charity Album (1965); US – The Rolling Stones, Now! (1965)	2:33
16.	"The Last Time"	UK – A-side (1965) / Big Hits (High Tide and Green Grass) (1966); US – A-side (1965) / Out of Our Heads (1965)	3:42
17.	"Play with Fire" (Nanker Phelge)	UK – B-side of "The Last Time" (1965) / Hot Rocks 1964-1971 (1971); US – B-side of "The Last Time" (1965) / Out of Our Heads (1965)	2:15
18.	"One More Try"	UK – Stone Age (1971); US – Out of Our Heads (1965)	1:57
19.	"My Girl" (Smokey Robinson, Ronald White)	UK – Stone Age (1971); US – Flowers (1967)	2:39
20.	"I've Been Loving You Too Long" (Otis Redding, Jerry Butler)	UK – Gimme Shelter (1971); US – Got Live If You Want It! (1966)	2:57
21.	"(I Can't Get No) Satisfaction"	UK – A-side (1965) / Big Hits (High Tide and Green Grass) (1966); US – A-side (1965) / Out of Our Heads (1965)	3:44
22.	"The Spider and the Fly"	UK – B-side of "(I Can't Get No) Satisfaction) (1965); US – Out of Our Heads (1965)	3:40

Vol. 2
No.	Title	Original release(s)	Length
1.	"Get Off of My Cloud"	UK – A-side (1965) / Big Hits (High Tide and Green Grass) (1966); US – A-side (1965) / December's Children (And Everybody's) (1965)	2:54
2.	"The Singer Not the Song"	UK – B-side of "Get Off of My Cloud" (1965); US – December's Children (And Everybody's) (1965)	2:24
3.	"As Tears Go By" (Mick Jagger, Keith Richards, Andrew Loog Oldham)	UK – B-side of "19th Nervous Breakdown" (1966) / Big Hits (High Tide and Green Grass) (1966); US – A-side (1965) / December's Children (And Everybody's) (1965)	2:47
4.	"Blue Turns to Grey"	UK – Stone Age (1971); US – December's Children (And Everybody's) (1965)	2:29
5.	"19th Nervous Breakdown"	UK & US – A-side (1966) / Big Hits (High Tide and Green Grass) (1966)	3:57
6.	"Sad Day"	UK – No Stone Unturned (1973); US – B-side of "19th Nervous Breakdown" (1966)	3:03
7.	"Sittin' on a Fence"	UK – Through the Past Darkly (Big Hits Vol. 2) (1969); US – Flowers (1967)	3:04
8.	"Ride on, Baby"	US – Flowers (1967)	2:54
9.	"Paint It Black"	UK – A-side (1966) / Big Hits (High Tide and Green Grass) (1966); US – A-side (1966) / Aftermath (1966)	3:25
10.	"Long, Long While"	UK – B-side to "Paint It Black" (1966) / No Stone Unturned (1973); US – More Hot Rocks (Big Hits & Fazed Cookies) (1972)	3:01
11.	"Have You Seen Your Mother, Baby, Standing in the Shadow?"	UK – A-side (1966) / Big Hits (High Tide and Green Grass) (1966); US – A-side (1966) / Flowers (1967)	2:35
12.	"Who's Driving Your Plane?"	UK – B-side of "Have You Seen Your Mother, Baby, Standing in the Shadow?" (1966) / No Stone Unturned (1973); US – B-side of "Have You Seen Your Mother, Baby, Standing in the Shadow?" (1966)	3:13
13.	"Let's Spend the Night Together"	UK – A-side (1967) / Through the Past, Darkly (Big Hits Vol. 2) (1969); US – A-side (1967) / Between the Buttons (1967)	3:37
14.	"Ruby Tuesday"	UK – A-side (1967) / Through the Past, Darkly (Big Hits Vol. 2) (1969); US – A-side (1967) / Between the Buttons (1967)	3:16
15.	"Dandelion"	UK & US – B-side of "We Love You" (1967) / Through the Past, Darkly (Big Hits Vol. 2) (1969)	3:34
16.	"We Love You"	UK – A-side (1967) / Through the Past, Darkly (Big Hits Vol. 2) (1969); US – A-side (1967) / More Hot Rocks (Big Hits & Fazed Cookies) (1972)	4:22
17.	"Child of the Moon (rmk)"	UK & US – B-side of "Jumpin' Jack Flash" (1968) / More Hot Rocks (Big Hits & Fazed Cookies) (1972)	3:11
18.	"Jumpin' Jack Flash"	UK & US – A-side (1968) / Through the Past, Darkly (Big Hits Vol. 2) (1969)	3:44
19.	"Honky Tonk Women"	UK & US – A-side (1969) / Through the Past, Darkly (Big Hits Vol. 2) (1969)	3:02
20.	"Brown Sugar"	UK & US – A-side (1971) / Sticky Fingers (1971)	3:50
21.	"Wild Horses"	UK – Sticky Fingers (1971); US – A-side (1971) / Sticky Fingers (1971)	5:44
