= The Ridgeway Sisters =

American R&B vocal sister group from Detroit, Michigan

- Also known as: Sweet Cream; The Ridgeways
- Origin: Detroit, Michigan, U.S.
- Genres: Gospel; R&B; soul; disco
- Instrument: Vocals
- Years active: 1963-2003
- Past members: Esther Ridgeway; Gloria Ridgeway; Gracie Ridgeway

The Ridgeway Sisters were an American R&B vocal group composed of a trio of sisters, Esther, Gloria, and Gracie Ridgeway. The sisters were mostly notable for providing session background vocals for musicians throughout their career.

== History ==
The group composed of three sisters born in Detroit, Gloria Dehaven Ridgeway (born June 1955), Gracie Mae Ridgeway (June 16, 1957 – April 19, 2006), and Esther Lene Ridgeway (June 7, 1959 – February 22, 2003), born to Ilene Ridgeway (November 6, 1931 – April 27, 2020) and Tommie Ray Ridgeway. The group grew up singing in the choir at their church, Beulah Baptist Church, in their hometown of Detroit. In 1978, The trio began their recording career under the name "Sweet Cream" on the Shadybrook Records label, distributed by Janus Records, releasing their debut album, Sweet Cream and Other Delights. The album was considered a parody of Whipped Cream & Other Delights. They scored a Top 50 hit with "I Don't Know What I'd Do (If You Ever Left Me)", that same year. The song peaked at number 41 on the Hot Soul Singles chart. The song peaked at No. 9 on the Dance Club Songs chart in July. It also peaked at No. 32 on the same chart in that same year. on In 1981, they were featured on the back cover and on backing vocals on Gene Dunlap's album "It's Just the Way I Feel", and this time, their brother, Tommie Ridgeway Jr., joined them on songwriting. The group would provide backup vocals for artists such as Aretha Franklin, Nancy Wilson, Gerald Alston, Vesta Williams, Keith Washington, Vanessa Bell Armstrong, Jerry Butler, Fontella Bass, Dionne Warwick and Wendy Moten.

In 1989, their brother, Tommie Ridgeway (November 12, 1949 - November 18, 1989), died from a drug dealing incident.

In 1998, they made their appearance in Blues Brothers 2000, as backup singers for Franklin, singing a remake of Respect. According to Franklin, the group inspired her to give up smoking.

In 2003, they recorded in the studio with Anita Baker for her My Everything album, after she received support from them after her mother's death. Esther died on February 22, 2003, at the Henry Ford Hospital in Detroit from a heart attack. They were credited as writers on "You're My Everything" from Baker's album. Gracie died on April 19, 2006, from a skin condition. She was buried at Grand Lawn Cemetery in Detroit.

Their mother, Ilene Ridgeway, died on April 27, 2020, at the age of 88.

== Discography ==
Sweet Cream and Other Delights (1978, Shadybrook Records)

1. "I Don't Know What I'd Do (If You Ever Left Me)" (5:52) #41 R&B, #9 Dance
2. "Pretty Little Black Boy" (6:18)
3. "You Brought Joy" (4:33)
4. "Flyin' High" (3:18)
5. "Do A Dance For Love" (5:48)
6. "We're Not Gonna Make It" (4:53)
7. "Skunk Funk" (3:45)
8. "Disco Dance and Party" (5:08)

Backing vocal credits

- Gene Dunlap – It's Just the Way I Feel (1981)
- One Way – Lady (1984)
- Alicia Myers – I Appreciate (1984)
- One Way – Wrap Your Body (1985)
- Aretha Franklin – Aretha (1986)
- Regina Belle – All By Myself (1987)
- Aretha Franklin – What You See Is What You Sweat (1991)
- Randy Crawford – Through the Eyes of Love (1992)
- Wendy Moten – Wendy Moten (1992)
- Vesta Williams – Everything–N–More (1993)
- Keith Washington – You Make It Easy (1993)
- Wendy Moten – Time for Change (1995)
- Four Tops – Christmas Here with You (1995)
- Nancy Wilson – If I Had It My Way (1997)
- Aretha Franklin – A Rose Is Still a Rose (1998)
- Wendy Moten – Life's What You Made It (2001)
- Anita Baker – My Everything (2004)
