= The Very Best of Aretha Franklin, Vol. 1 =

1994 compilation album by Aretha Franklin

Compilation album by Aretha Franklin
- Released: March 18, 1994
- Recorded: January 1967 – October 1969
- Genre: Soul music
- Length: 47:26
- Label: Rhino Records
- Producer: Gary Stewart

Aretha Franklin chronology
Greatest Hits: 1980-1994 (1994)	The Very Best of Aretha Franklin, Vol. 1 (1994)	A Rose Is Still A Rose (1998)

Professional ratings
Review scores
Source	Rating
AllMusic	link
NME	9/10

The Very Best of Aretha Franklin, Vol. 1 is a compilation album by singer Aretha Franklin, released by Rhino Records in March 1994. The album compiles 13 of her first 14 singles for Atlantic Records all of which were recorded during the 1960s. The original recordings were produced by Jerry Wexler, and this compilation was certified platinum by the RIAA.

== Content ==
This compilation contains thirteen of Franklin's initial fourteen singles released in the United States on Atlantic from her debut "I Never Loved a Man (The Way I Love You)" of February 1967 through "Call Me" of January 1970. The first eight all made the top ten on the Billboard Hot 100, including her chart-topping signature song, "Respect." No single included charted lower than No. 19 on the Hot 100. Missing is her eleventh single of this sequence, "I Can't See Myself Leaving You" of April 1969; also missing is her 1968 version of "(I Can't Get No) Satisfaction" released as a single in the United Kingdom only.

The other three tracks appeared as b-sides, two of which charted on the Hot 100 independently of their hit sides. The single mixes do not appear here on every track.

All basic tracks were recorded at FAME Studios in Muscle Shoals, Alabama, with the studio's core session musicians. Additional overdubbing on select recordings took place at Atlantic Studios in New York City.

== Track listing ==
No.	Title	Writer(s)	Length
1.	"Respect" (Atlantic 2403 Billboard No. 1)	Otis Redding	2:25
2.	"Baby I Love You" (Atlantic 2427 Billboard No. 4)	Ronnie Shannon	2:51
3.	"I Never Loved a Man (The Way I Love You)" (Atlantic 2386 Billboard No. 9)	Ronnie Shannon	2:43
4.	"Chain of Fools" (Atlantic 2464 Billboard No. 2)	Don Covay	2:48
5.	"Do Right Woman, Do Right Man" (Atlantic 2386b)	Chips Moman, Dan Penn	3:15
6.	"(You Make Me Feel Like) A Natural Woman" (Atlantic 2441 Billboard No. 8)	Gerry Goffin, Carole King, Jerry Wexler	2:44
7.	"(Sweet Sweet Baby) Since You've Been Gone" (Atlantic 2486 Billboard No. 5)	Aretha Franklin, Ted White	2:25
8.	"Ain't No Way" (Atlantic 2486b Billboard No. 16)	Carolyn Franklin	2:54
9.	"Think" (Atlantic 2518 Billboard No. 7)	Aretha Franklin, Ted White	4:14
10.	"See Saw" (Atlantic 2574 Billboard No. 14)	Steve Cropper, Don Covay	2:19
11.	"The House That Jack Built" (Atlantic 2546 Billboard No. 6)	Bob Lance, Fran Robbins	2:46
12.	"I Say a Little Prayer" (Atlantic 2546b Billboard No. 10)	Burt Bacharach, Hal David	2:22
13.	"The Weight" (Atlantic 2603 Billboard No. 19)	Robbie Robertson	3:36
14.	"Eleanor Rigby" (Atlantic 2683 Billboard No. 17)	John Lennon, Paul McCartney	2:38
15.	"Share Your Love with Me" (Atlantic 2650 Billboard No. 13)	Alfred Braggs	3:20
16.	"Call Me" (Atlantic 2706 Billboard No. 13)	Aretha Franklin	3:56

== Collective personnel ==
- Aretha Franklin — vocals, piano
- Bernie Glow, Wayne Jackson, Melvin Lastie, Joe Newman — trumpets
- Tony Studd — bass trombone
- Charles Chalmers, King Curtis, Andrew Love, Seldon Powell, Frank Wess — tenor saxophone
- Willie Bridges, Haywood Henry — baritone saxophone
- Barry Beckett, Spooner Oldham — keyboards
- Duane Allman, Eddie Hinton, Jimmy Johnson, Chips Moman, Joe South — guitars
- Tommy Cogbill, David Hood, Jerry Jemmott — bass
- Gene Chrisman, Roger Hawkins — drums
- Carolyn Franklin, Erma Franklin, Ellie Greenwich, Cissy Houston, The Sweet Inspirations — backing vocals

== Charts ==
Chart (1994)	Peak position
US Billboard 200	105
US Top R&B/Hip-Hop Albums (Billboard)	10
Chart (2018)	Peak position
Japanese Albums (Oricon)	117
Swiss Albums (Schweizer Hitparade)	85

== Certifications ==
Region	Certification	Certified units/sales
France (SNEP)	2× Gold	150,000^{*}
United States (RIAA)	Platinum	1,000,000^{^}
^{*} Sales figures based on certification alone.^{^} Shipments figures based on certification alone.
