= A Rose Is Still a Rose (song) =

Single by Aretha Franklin

from the album A Rose Is Still a Rose
- Released: February 10, 1998
- Recorded: 1997
- Studio: Chung King Studios (New York, NY); Vanguard Recording Complex (Oak Park, MI)
- Genre: R&B; neo soul; hip hop soul
- Length: 4:27
- Label: Arista
- Songwriters: Lauryn Hill; Edie Brickell; Brad Houser; Brandon Aly; John W. Bush; Kenny Withrow
- Producer: Lauryn Hill

Aretha Franklin singles chronology
"Willing to Forgive" (1994)	"A Rose Is Still a Rose" (1998)	"Here We Go Again" (1998)

Music video
- "A Rose Is Still a Rose" on YouTube

"A Rose Is Still a Rose" is a song recorded by American singer Aretha Franklin. It was written and produced by singer Lauryn Hill for Franklin's album of the same name (1998). Elements of the song "What I Am" by Edie Brickell and the New Bohemians were interpolated and sung throughout the song by Hill herself.

The song focused on a motherly figure giving advice to a younger woman who keeps getting into bad relationships. Throughout "A Rose Is Still a Rose", Franklin advises that in spite of everything and despite the woman's "scorned roses and thorn crowns," the woman is "still a rose".

Released as the album's lead single in February 1998 by Arista, "A Rose Is Still a Rose" became a surprise hit for Franklin. The song reached the top 40 of both the U.S. Billboard Hot 100 and the UK singles chart, becoming the final top 40 pop hit of Franklin's career. It also peaked atop the Adult R&B Songs and Dance Club Songs charts, and was her best-selling 1990s single, selling over a million copies worldwide. The song was nominated for two Grammy Awards, with Franklin being receiving a nomination for Best Female R&B Vocal Performance and Hill being nominated for Best R&B Song as the song's songwriter.

== Background ==
In 1994, Aretha Franklin began working on her first studio album since What You See Is What You Sweat (1991). That album resulted in her lowest sales and charting peak in her career at the time. In between that time, Franklin collaborated with Babyface on several songs that were included in her greatest hits collection, Greatest Hits: 1980-1994, including "Willing to Forgive", which became her first top 40 single in five years, which was to be followed by the studio album, which was delayed due to other commitments.

In 1995, fellow Arista label mate and honorary niece Whitney Houston handpicked Franklin to contribute to the soundtrack for Waiting to Exhale, where she recorded the ballad "It Hurts Like Hell". Franklin's vocals for the song showcased a higher mezzo soprano vocal, recalling her Atlantic Records period, which was accomplished after Franklin had quit chain smoking cigarettes in early 1992.

During the first fifteen years of her Arista tenure, Franklin had mostly sung under a deeper, raspier contralto as a result of vocal damage from chain smoking. The Waiting to Exhale soundtrack was a hit, selling over 12 million copies worldwide, leading to contemporary R&B producers offering to produce Franklin's next album, which finally started production in 1997. Among those younger producers were Lauryn Hill of the Fugees, who offered Clive Davis and Franklin her composition, "A Rose Is Still a Rose", to which the pair accepted.

== Critical reception ==
Larry Flick from Billboard described the song as "a sleek, jeep-styled cruiser that matches her with Lauryn Hill of the Fugees," noting that "it's an absolutely electric union that results in Franklin's strongest, most instantly pop-viable single in eons. Hills dresses the track in fashionable shuffle-funk beats, a snaky bassline, and jiggly wah-wah guitars, leaving the legendary singer plenty of room to flex and vamp to maximum effect." He also added, "Kids will dig the contemporary vibe of the track (and, it is hoped, use this single as a springboard into a deeper exploration of Franklin's plush catalog), while more mature listeners will bond with the sage, almost motherly tone of the lyrics. A li'l something for everyone."

Jeremy Helligar from Entertainment Weekly said that "A Rose Is Still a Rose" "doesn't match the soulful finesse of "Spanish Harlem", but when Lady Soul sings about a rose, something divine happens." He concluded, "Even after a dozen listens, the song's it's-his-problem-not-yours message doesn't lose its bloom." After the passing of Franklin in 2018, Alexis Petridis from The Guardian wrote, "The late 90s attempt to give Franklin a hip-hop/neo soul-influenced makeover didn’t really work, except on the album’s Lauryn Hill-penned title track. The beat and the lyrical references to “flossin’” are contemporary, but the singer sounds unfazed, delivering a coolly controlled performance." Music Week stated that the single "will produce another hit for both these accomplished musicians. The combination of Lauryn's laid-back hip hop style and Aretha's powerful voice means the track will appeal to all markets. The most contemporary track released by Aretha lately, it is now in the top five of the RM Club Chart." A reviewer from People Magazine named it the best song of the album.

== Commercial performance ==
The song entered the Billboard Hot 100 at number 43 and number ten on the Hot R&B Singles charts on March 14, 1998. Eventually, it reached its peak of number 26 and number 5 on the respective charts on May 2. It spent 18 and 25 cumulative weeks respectively on the Hot 100 and R&B singles charts.

"A Rose Is Still a Rose" became a sleeper hit for Franklin, producing her best singles chart results since the mid-1980s. It would be her 43rd -- and final top 40 pop hit on the Billboard Hot 100 nearly 37 years after first reaching the top 40 with her rendition of "Rock-a-Bye Your Baby with a Dixie Melody" in 1961. It was her last top ten single on the Hot R&B Singles chart and her pentimulate top forty hit on that chart.

== Music video ==
An accompanying music video was produced to promote the single, directed by Lauryn Hill and designed by Ron Norsworthy. It features Franklin, Hill and other female R&B singers such as Faith Evans, Changing Faces, Amel Larrieux and actress Elise Neal as protagonists along with A Tribe Called Quest rapper, Q-Tip.

== Track listings ==
- US CD single
1. "A Rose Is Still a Rose" - 3:56
2. "Snippets from the album 'A Rose Is Still a Rose'" - 5:30
- US promo single
1. "A Rose Is Still a Rose (without intro)" - 3:56
2. "A Rose Is Still a Rose (with intro)" -4:25
- US maxi single
1. "A Rose Is Still a Rose (Love to Infinity Rhythm Radio Mix)" - 3:58
2. "A Rose Is Still a Rose (Hex Hector Club Mix)" - 8:55
3. "A Rose Is Still a Rose (Love to Infinity Club Mix)" - 6:56
4. "A Rose Is Still a Rose (Album Version)" - 4:27
5. "A Rose Is Still a Rose (Instrumental)" - 4:27
- UK CD 1
1. "A Rose Is Still a Rose (Original Radio Edit)" - 3:56
2. "A Rose Is Still a Rose (Desert Eagles Discs Remix)" - 4:51
3. "A Rose Is Still a Rose (London Connection Hierachal Mix)" - 7:42
4. "A Rose Is Still a Rose (London Connection's Cookin' Dub)" - 6:26
5. "A Rose Is Still a Rose (Instrumental)" - 4:27
- UK CD 2
1. "A Rose Is Still a Rose (Original Radio Edit)" - 3:56
2. "A Rose Is Still a Rose (Love to Infinity Rhythm Radio Mix)" - 3:58
3. "A Rose Is Still a Rose (Love to Infinity Kick Mix)" - 7:10
4. "A Rose Is Still a Rose (Johnny Vicious Club Mix)" - 10:47
5. "A Rose Is Still a Rose (Hex Hector Club Mix)" - 8:55

- Hip Hop Mixes promo CD single
1. "A Rose Is Still a Rose (Yogi's Bystorm Remix)" - 4:03
2. "A Rose Is Still a Rose (Desert Eagle Remix)" - 4:26
- Hip Hop Mixes promo 12" single
1. "A Rose Is Still a Rose (Yogi's Bystorm Remix)" - 4:03
2. "A Rose Is Still a Rose (Yogi's Bystorm Remix) [Instrumental]" - 4:51
3. "A Rose Is Still a Rose (Yogi's Bystorm Remix) [Acappella]" - 4:40
4. "A Rose Is Still a Rose (Desert Eagle Remix)" - 4:26
5. "A Rose Is Still a Rose (Desert Eagle Remix) [Instrumental]" - 4:27
6. "A Rose Is Still a Rose (Original Radio Edit)" - 4:00
- The Remixes" (2x12" vinyls)
1. "A Rose Is Still a Rose (Hex Hector Club Mix)" - 8:55
2. "A Rose Is Still a Rose (Album Version)" - 4:29
3. "A Rose Is Still a Rose (Johnny Vicious Dub)" - 9:28
4. "A Rose Is Still a Rose (Love to Infinity Kick Mix)" - 7:11
5. "A Rose Is Still a Rose (Johnny Vicious Club Mix)" - 10:44
6. "A Rose Is Still a Rose (Hex Hector Drums)" - 3:50
7. "A Rose Is Still a Rose (Love to Infinity Club Mix)" - 6:56
8. "A Rose Is Still a Rose (Love to Infinity Rhythm Radio Mix)" - 3:58
9. "A Rose Is Still a Rose (Album Version) [Instrumental]" - 5:25

== Credits and personnel ==
Credits adapted from the liner notes of A Rose Is Still a Rose.

Performance

- Lead vocals: Aretha Franklin
- Background vocals: Lauryn Hill, Aretha Franklin
- Piano: James Poyser

- Guitar: Johari Newton
- Bass guitar: Vere Isaac
- Strings: Indigo Quartet

Production

- Produced and arranged by Lauryn Hill
- Strings arranged by Akua Dixon
- Music programmed by Vada Nobles

- Recording engineer: Warren Riker
- Recording and mixing engineer: Commissioner Gordon
- Audio mixing assisted by: Alex Olsson

== Charts and certifications ==
=== Weekly charts ===
Chart (1998)	Peak position
Europe (Eurochart Hot 100)	87
Iceland (Íslenski Listinn Topp 40)	35
Scotland (OCC)	38
UK Singles (OCC)	22
UK R&B (OCC)	6
US Billboard Hot 100	26
US Adult R&B Songs (Billboard)	1
US Dance Club Songs (Billboard)	1
US Hot R&B/Hip-Hop Songs (Billboard)	5
US Rhythmic Airplay (Billboard)	35

=== Year-end charts ===
Chart (1998)	Position
UK Urban (Music Week)	21
US Billboard Hot 100	95
US Hot R&B/Hip-Hop Songs (Billboard)	22

=== Certifications ===
Region	Certification	Certified units/sales
United States (RIAA)	Gold	500,000
