= Child of the Moon (song) =

- Reverse single sleeve (US)

Single by the Rolling Stones
- A-side: "Jumpin' Jack Flash"
- Released: 24 May 1968
- Recorded: 11 & 20 April 1968
- Studio: Olympic (London)
- Genre: Psychedelia
- Length: 3:12
- Label: Decca (UK); London (US)
- Songwriter: Jagger–Richards
- Producer: Jimmy Miller

The Rolling Stones UK singles chronology
"We Love You" (1967)	"Jumpin' Jack Flash" / "Child of the Moon" (1968)	"Honky Tonk Women" (1969)

The Rolling Stones US singles chronology
"She's a Rainbow" (1967)	"Jumpin' Jack Flash" / "Child of the Moon" (1968)	"Street Fighting Man" (1968)

"Child of the Moon" is a song by the English rock band the Rolling Stones. It was released on 24 May 1968, as the B-side to their single "Jumpin' Jack Flash". Written by Mick Jagger and Keith Richards, it was among the band's first recordings with producer Jimmy Miller. Stemming from the sessions for Their Satanic Majesties Request (1967), it has been referred to as their "farewell to psychedelia", bridging the psychedelic pop of that album with the rootsy blues rock of their following work.

== Overview ==
"Child of the Moon" dates back to the sessions for Their Satanic Majesties Request (1967); authors Philippe Margotin and Jean-Michel Guesdon state it was "most probably" developed in July 1967, with a demo being recorded in October of that year. Further recording occurred in March and April 1968 during the sessions for "Jumpin' Jack Flash", with the final track being recorded on 11 and 20 April. The two songs constituted the band's first release to be produced by Jimmy Miller. The recording features Brian Jones on soprano saxophone, while frequent collaborator Nicky Hopkins plays organ and possibly piano.

Margotin and Guesdon call "Child of the Moon" the Stones' "farewell to psychedelia". David Marchese of Vulture considers it to be a "bridge" between the band's pop and psychedelic work and the blues rock of their following albums, noting the juxtaposition of its "starry-eyed" lyrics and the "crunch" of the guitars and rhythm section. Steve Appleford considers the lyrics to be a "parting vision of innocence for the flower power generation" sung in a "Dylanesque" voice. Richie Unterberger of AllMusic cites it and "Jumpin' Jack Flash" as evidence of the band's "slide toward a slightly more laid-back, funkier rock sound". He also notes that the lyrics present a "more benign, cosmic view of women" than the band's previous songs, comparing it to "She's a Rainbow" (1967). Mojo interpreted its lyrics as a "polytheistic love letter" from Jagger to Marianne Faithfull.

== Release and promotion ==
A promotional video was made for the song, directed by Michael Lindsay-Hogg. Filming took place on a farm near Enfield, London. The video depicts the band in a forest, with two women (one played by Eileen Atkins) also present, gazing at the moon. Mojo likens the video to a "British sci-fi/horror short" making references to Italian giallo, Village of the Damned (1960), and Eye of the Devil (1966).

"Child of the Moon" was released as the B-side of the "Jumpin' Jack Flash" single on 24 May 1968. According to Margotin and Guesdon, Jones heavily advocated for it to be the A-side but was overruled, a decision which they cite as evidence of the "growing divide" between Jones and the rest of the band.

== Reception and legacy ==
"Child of the Moon" has garnered a generally positive reception from biographers and critics. Marchese ranked it as the band's 96th-best song, calling it "charming" and highlighting Jones' "gleaming" saxophone. Dan John Miller of Blance has also praised the song, noting its "perfect blend of country blues and this with this beautifully sad touch of psychedelia"; he also noted Jones' contributions to the track, stating: "I'm sure there is a huge chunk of Brian Jones driving this. His spirit really feels a big part of the song." Unterberger is more critical, dismissing it as "filler, and not one of their most distinguished late-'60s efforts by any means."

The song has since been included on compilation albums including More Hot Rocks (Big Hits & Fazed Cookies) (1972), No Stone Unturned (1973), Singles Collection: The London Years (1989), Singles 1968–1971 (2005), and the four-disc super deluxe edition of GRRR! (2012). Acts who have covered the song include the Celibate Rifles and Band of Susans.

== Personnel ==
Adapted from Margotin and Guesden:

Musicians

- Mick Jagger – vocals
- Keith Richards – rhythm guitar, backing vocals
- Brian Jones – soprano saxophone
- Bill Wyman – bass
- Charlie Watts – drums
- Nicky Hopkins – organ, possible piano
- Jimmy Miller – backing vocals

Technical

- Jimmy Miller – production
- Eddie Kramer – sound engineer
- George Chkiantz – mixing
- Glyn Johns – mixing
