= Here We Go Again (Aretha Franklin song) =

Single by Aretha Franklin

from the album A Rose Is Still a Rose
- Released: June 16, 1998
- Studio: Krosswire Studios (Atlanta, GA); Vanguard Recording Complex (Oak Park, MI)
- Genre: R&B; soul
- Length: 3:31
- Label: Arista
- Songwriters: Trina Broussard; Jermaine Dupri; Trey Lorenz; Mauro Malavasi; David Romani; Wayne Garfield
- Producers: Dupri; Manuel Seal

Aretha Franklin singles chronology
"A Rose Is Still a Rose" (1998)	"Here We Go Again" (1998)	"Put You Up on Game" (2007)

Music video
- "Here We Go Again" on YouTube

"Here We Go Again" is a song by American singer and songwriter Aretha Franklin. It was written by Trina Broussard, Jermaine Dupri and Trey Lorenz for Franklin's thirty-fourth studio album, A Rose Is Still a Rose (1998), while production was helmed by Dupri and Manuel Seal. The song is built around replayed portions of "The Glow of Love" (1980) by Italian-American post-disco group Change. Due to the inclusion of the sample, Mauro Malavasi, David Romani and Wayne K. Garfield are also credited as songwriters. The song was the second single released from A Rose Is Still a Rose in June 1998, by Arista Records, and reached number 76 on the US Billboard Hot 100, also becoming Franklin's fifth number-one on the Billboard Dance Club Songs chart.

== Critical reception ==
Larry Flick from Billboard magazine wrote, "Although popsters are still basking in the glow of 'A Rose Is Still a Rose', R&B tastemakers get to preview another gem from Lady Soul's current opus. This time, she teams up with Jermaine Dupri and Manuel Seal for a shoulder-shakin' jeep cruiser that keeps her on the tip of what kids are vibin', while also keeping it mature enough for older listeners who are less interested in production frills. Pumped by a chorus that simply won't quit, 'Here We Go Again' actually has the muscle to be Franklin's biggest multi-format single in ages. How wise of Arista, however, to serve her core audience at R&B radio first."

== Credits and personnel ==
Credits adapted from the liner notes of A Rose Is Still a Rose.

Performance

- Lead Vocals: Aretha Franklin
- Background Vocals: Trina Broussard
- Additional Instruments: Jermaine Dupri & Carl So-Lowe

Production

- Co-Produced by Manuel Seal
- Record Producer and Mixing Engineer: Jermaine Dupri
- Recording and Mixing Engineer: Phil Tan

== Charts ==
=== Weekly charts ===
Chart (1998)	Peak position
Poland Airplay (Music & Media)	8
Scottish Singles Sales (Official Charts)	83
UK Singles (Official Charts)	68
UK Hip Hop/R&B (Official Charts)	17
US Billboard Hot 100	76
US Dance Club Songs (Billboard)	1
US Hot R&B/Hip-Hop Songs (Billboard)	24
US Adult R&B Songs (Billboard)	18

=== Year-end charts ===
Chart (1998)	Position
UK Urban (Music Week)	31
