= Put You Up on Game =

Single by Aretha Franklin with Fantasia

from the album Jewels in the Crown: All-Star Duets with the Queen
- Released: October 1, 2007
- Length: 4:16
- Label: Arista
- Songwriter(s): Harvey Mason Jr.; Damon Thomas; Steve Russell; Antonio Dixon; Kaleena Harper; Larry Jackson
- Producer(s): The Underdogs

Aretha Franklin singles chronology
"Here We Go Again" (1998)	"Put You Up on Game" (2007)	"Rolling in the Deep" (2014)

Fantasia singles chronology
"When I See U" (2007)	"Put You Up on Game" (2007)	"Bittersweet" (2010)

"Put You Up on Game" is a duet by American singers Aretha Franklin and Fantasia Barrino. It was written by Harvey Mason Jr., Damon Thomas, Steve Russell, Antonio Dixon, Kaleena Harper, and Larry Jackson for Franklin's 2007 compilation album Jewels in the Crown: All-Star Duets with the Queen, with production helmed by The Underdogs. The song peaked at number ten on the Adult R&B Songs and earned the pair an NAACP Image Award nomination in the Outstanding Duo or Group category.

== Charts ==
Chart (2007)	Peak position
US Adult R&B Songs (Billboard)	10
US Hot R&B/Hip-Hop Songs (Billboard)	41
