= Rock-A-Lott =

1986 song by Aretha Franklin

Single by Aretha Franklin

from the album Aretha
- Released: June 1987
- Length: 6:21
- Label: Arista
- Songwriter(s): Narada Michael Walden; Joe Johnson; Preston Glass
- Producer(s): Walden

Aretha Franklin singles chronology
| "I Knew You Were Waiting (For Me)" (1987) | "Rock-A-Lott" (1987) | "If You Need My Love Tonight" (1987) |

Music video
- "Rock-A-Lott" on YouTube

"Rock-A-Lott" is a song by American singer Aretha Franklin and the second single from her thirty-first studio album Aretha (1986).

== Music video ==
The music video finds Aretha Franklin and her backing band transformed into claymation and inside a boombox, which travels throughout Washington Square Park. The video features roller skating, a performance of the song's saxophone solo and cameos from Rodney Dangerfield, Cynthia Gibb, Ian Buchanan, Tony Bennett, Whodini, Mark Hamill and Whitney Houston.

== Charts ==
Chart performance for "Rock-A-Lott"
| Chart (1987) | Peak position |
|---|---|
| UK Singles (OCC) | 84 |
| US Billboard Hot 100 | 82 |
| US Dance Club Songs (Billboard) | 4 |
| US Hot R&B/Hip-Hop Songs (Billboard) | 25 |
