= Jimmy Lee (song) =

Single by Aretha Franklin

from the album Aretha
- B-side: "If You Need My Love Tonight"
- Released: November 1986
- Recorded: 1986
- Genre: Soul; pop
- Length: 5:47
- Label: Arista
- Songwriters: Narada Michael Walden; Lisa Walden; Preston Glass; Jeffrey Cohen
- Producer: Narada Michael Walden

Aretha Franklin singles chronology
| "Jumpin' Jack Flash" (1986) | "Jimmy Lee" (1986) | "I Knew You Were Waiting (For Me)" (1987) |

"Jimmy Lee" is a song written by Narada Michael Walden, Lisa Walden, Preston Glass, and Jeffrey Cohen for American singer Aretha Franklin, who recorded it for her 1986 album Aretha. Produced by Narada Michael Walden, the track was released as the lead single from the album in late 1986.

== Personnel ==
- Aretha Franklin – vocals
- Walter Afanasieff – acoustic piano, synthesizer
- David Sancious – synthesizer
- Corrado Rustici – Charvel MIDI guitar synthesizer
- Randy Jackson – acoustic bass
- Narada Michael Walden – drums, acoustic piano intro
- Preston Glass – bells
- Kenny G – tenor saxophone
- Marc Russo – alto saxophone
- David Wallace – trombone
- Jerry Hey – trumpet and horn arrangement

== Charts ==
"Jimmy Lee" peaked at #28 on the Billboard Hot 100 and #36 on the Cash Box Top 100 singles chart. It also hit #2 on the R&B singles chart (thwarted from the pole position by Cameo), and No. 19 on the Dance/Club Play chart in early 1987.

Chart performance for "Jimmy Lee"
| Chart (1987) | Peak position |
|---|---|
| US Billboard Hot 100 | 28 |
| US Dance Club Songs (Billboard) | 19 |
| US Hot R&B/Hip-Hop Songs (Billboard) | 2 |
