= Jump to It (song) =

Single by Aretha Franklin

from the album Jump to It
- B-side: "Just My Daydream"
- Released: June 1982
- Recorded: 1981
- Genre: R&B; synth-funk
- Length: 6:40 (album version); 3:58 (radio edit)
- Label: Arista
- Songwriters: Luther Vandross; Marcus Miller
- Producer: Luther Vandross

Aretha Franklin singles chronology
"It's My Turn" (1981)	"Jump to It" (1982)	"Love Me Right" (1982)

"Jump to It" is a 1982 song by American recording artist Aretha Franklin. The track is from her Gold-certified 1982 album of the same name, produced by Luther Vandross. The song was written by Vandross and Marcus Miller and features background vocals performed by Vandross and Cissy Houston. The single reached No. 1 on Billboard's Hot Soul Singles chart, remaining there for four consecutive weeks.

"Jump to It" was Franklin's biggest pop hit since 1974, peaking at No. 24 on the Billboard Hot 100 chart in October 1982. The upbeat song also reached No. 4 on the Billboard dance chart. It was nominated for a Grammy Award and several American Music Awards.

== Personnel ==
- Aretha Franklin – lead vocals
- Doc Powell – guitar
- Marcus Miller – bass, synthesizer, synthesizer and rhythm arrangements
- Yogi Horton – drums
- Errol "Crusher" Bennett – congas
- Nat Adderley, Jr. – keyboards
- Luther Vandross – backing vocals
- Brenda White – backing vocals
- Cissy Houston – backing vocals
- Fonzi Thornton – backing vocals
- Michelle Cobbs – backing vocals
- Phillip Ballou – backing vocals
- Tawatha Agee – backing vocals

== Charts ==
Chart (1982)	Peak position
US Billboard Hot 100	24
US Hot Black Singles (Billboard)	1
US Dance Club Songs (Billboard)	4
