= The Lord's Taverners Charity Album =

England's Greatest Hitmakers
- Cover of the US release, England's Greatest Hitmakers

Compilation album by Various artists
- Released: May 21, 1965 in US; May 22, 1965 in UK
- Label: London in US; Decca in UK

14 Great Artist
- Cover of the UK release, 14 Great Artist

The Lord's Taverners Charity Album is the title usually given to an LP album produced by Decca Records in 1965, featuring fourteen artists under the Decca label (Decca LK 4695). Decca itself advertised the album under the name of 14 Great Artists, while the name on the sleeve is 14 New Recordings. In the United States the album was released as England's Greatest Hitmakers (London Records LL 3430).

The sleeve also carries this text:

"The profit from this record will be donated to the LORD’S TAVERNERS for the National Playing Fields Association, together with the royalty which has been personally given by each of these famous artists."

This text is missing from the US version, which also has a more prominent title.

All songs were recorded specially for this album and had never been released before. Most of them have since reappeared on an album and/or CD sampler however, although in two cases as late as 2009.

== List of tracks ==
Artist(s)	Song	Reissued
The Rolling Stones (A)	"Surprise Surprise"	UK: B-side of "Street Fighting Man" (1970) US: On the 1965 album The Rolling Stones, Now!
Kathy Kirby (A)	"Soon I’ll Wed My Love"	On the 2006 CD sampler Hits, Rarities and Lipgloss!
Them (A)	"Little Girl"	Remake on the 1965 album The Angry Young Them
Tom Jones (A)	"Kiss Kiss"	On the 1995 CD sampler The Legendary Tom Jones: 30th Anniversary Album
The Mike Leander Orchestra (A)	"Sandstorm"	–
Unit 4 + 2 (A)	"Woman From Liberia"	On the 2nd pressing of their 1st Album (1965)
Bern Elliott (A)	"Forget Her"	On the 1988 album The Beat Years
The Bachelors (B)	"Maureen"	–
The Zombies (B)	"Nothing’s Changed"	On the 1997 CD sampler Zombie Heaven
Lulu & The Luvvers (B)	"Just One Look"	On the 2009 CD sampler Shout! The Complete Decca Recordings; A remake is on the 2005 CD A Little Soul in Your Heart
The Johnny Howard Band (B)	"Tomboy"	On the 2003 CD sampler A Collector's Guide to 60's Brit Pop Instrumentals, Vol. 5
Billy Fury (B)	"This Diamond Ring"	On the 1980 album The World of Billy Fury, Vol. 2
The Applejacks (B)	"Baby's in Black"	On the 2009 CD sampler The Applejacks
Dave Berry (B)	"He’s With You"	On the 1973 album Remembering … Dave Berry

(A) = A-side; (B) = B-side; on the sleeve the tracks are given in alphabetical order by artists.
