= Willing to Forgive =

1994 single by Aretha Franklin

Single by Aretha Franklin

from the album Greatest Hits: 1980–1994
- B-side: "Honey"
- Released: May 1994
- Genre: R&B
- Length: 4:14
- Label: Arista
- Songwriters: Babyface; Daryl Simmons
- Producers: Babyface; Simmons

Aretha Franklin singles chronology
"A Deeper Love" (1994)	"Willing to Forgive" (1994)	"A Rose Is Still a Rose" (1998)

Music video
- "Willing to Forgive" on YouTube

"Willing to Forgive" is a song by American singer-songwriter Aretha Franklin from her seventh compilation album, Greatest Hits: 1980–1994 (1994). The song was released as the album's second single in May 1994, by Arista Records. Written and produced by Babyface and Daryl Simmons, it became a hit in the United States, reaching numbers 26 and 41 on the Billboard Hot 100 and Cash Box Top 100, and number five on the Billboard Hot R&B/Hip-Hop Songs chart. It also charted in the UK, reaching number 17 on the UK Singles Chart. On the Eurochart Hot 100, "Willing to Forgive" peaked at number 49 in July 1994. The accompanying music video was directed by Jim Shea.

== Critical reception ==
Jose F. Promis from AllMusic deemed the song an "assembly-line ballad". Billboard magazine complimented it as "superb" and "infectious". Dave Sholin from the Gavin Report commented, "Close to beginning her fourth decade as the reigning Queen Of Soul, it's a special song like this one, penned by Babyface and Daryl Simmons, that really allows Aretha to utilize her amazing vocal range. Her finest effort in many a moon should put her back on Top 40 in a big way." Another Gavin Report reviewers, Bill Speed and John Martinucci concluded with that the singer "presents 'Willing to Forgive' tenderly but with the in-your-face honesty that has become her soulful trademark."

Pan-European magazine Music & Media wrote, "Whereas most contemporary dance singers give everything at the wrong time, Aretha wonderfully restrains herself on this entrancing ballad. It's all about dosing your vocal power." Alan Jones from Music Week gave it a score of four out of five, stating, "A powerful R&B ballad draws a scorching performance from Aretha, whose commitment and attack do her credit." James Hamilton from the Record Mirror Dance Update named it a "pleasant enough 76bpm radio ballad" in his weekly dance column.

== Charts ==
=== Weekly charts ===
Chart (1994)	Peak position
Europe (Eurochart Hot 100)	49
Europe (European Hit Radio)	27
Israel (Israeli Singles Chart)	27
Scottish Singles Sales (Official Charts)	27
UK Singles (Official Charts)	17
UK Airplay (Music Week)	6
US Billboard Hot 100	26
US Adult Contemporary (Billboard)	22
US Adult R&B Songs (Billboard)	1
US Hot R&B/Hip-Hop Songs (Billboard)	5
US Maxi-Singles Sales (Billboard)	14
US Rhythmic Airplay (Billboard)	35
US Cash Box Top 100	41

=== Year-end charts ===
Chart (1994)	Position
UK Singles (OCC)	161
UK Airplay (Music Week)	42
US Billboard Hot 100	69
US Hot R&B/Hip-Hop Songs (Billboard)	13
US Urban Singles (Cash Box)	10

== Release history ==
Region	Date	Format(s)	Label(s)	Ref.
United States	May 1994	12-inch vinyl; CD; cassette	Arista	
United Kingdom	June 13, 1994	12-inch vinyl; CD; cassette	Arista	
