= Who's Zoomin' Who? =

1985 studio album by Aretha Franklin

Studio album by Aretha Franklin
- Released: July 9, 1985
- Recorded: October 1984 – May 1985
- Studios: The Automatt, San Francisco, California; Record Plant, Sausalito, California; United Sound, Detroit, Michigan; Right Track, New York City; Power Station, New York City
- Genres: Pop; R&B; synth-pop
- Length: 47:15
- Label: Arista
- Producers: Aretha Franklin; David A. Stewart; Narada Michael Walden

Aretha Franklin chronology
Get It Right (1983)	Who's Zoomin' Who? (1985)	Aretha (1986)

Singles from Who's Zoomin' Who?
- 1. "Freeway of Love" Released: June 1985; 2. "Who's Zoomin' Who" Released: August 1985; 3. "Sisters Are Doin' It for Themselves" Released: October 1985; 4. "Another Night" Released: 1986; 5. "Ain't Nobody Ever Loved You" Released: 1986

Who's Zoomin' Who? is the thirtieth studio album by American singer Aretha Franklin, released on July 9, 1985, by Arista Records. A departure from the Luther Vandross-produced adult contemporary sound of her previous albums Jump to It (1982) and Get It Right (1983), Franklin worked with producer Narada Michael Walden on the majority of the album, envisioning "a record with a younger sound to it". As a result, Who's Zoomin' Who? contains influences of several popular mid-1980s genres, including dance-pop, synth-pop, and contemporary R&B, as well as pop songs with crossover appeal.

Released to praising reviews, Who's Zoomin' Who? became Franklin's highest-charting album since Young, Gifted and Black (1972) and her first and only studio album to earn a platinum certification from the Recording Industry Association of America (RIAA), with more than one million copies physically distributed. A top-10 entry in New Zealand and Sweden, the album also went platinum in Canada and reached silver status in the United Kingdom. "Freeway of Love", the album's lead single, proved both a commercial success, as well as a career achievement for Franklin, earning her a Grammy Award for Best Female R&B Vocal Performance while holding the number-one position on Billboard's Hot R&B/Hip-Hop Songs chart for five consecutive weeks.

Who's Zoomin' Who? was considered Franklin's comeback album, with many journalists comparing its performance to Tina Turner's late-career crossover success with her album Private Dancer (1984), and marked the start of several collaborations with Walden. With the album, the singer established herself as a star of music video, with popular videos for "Freeway of Love", "Sisters Are Doin' It for Themselves" and "Another Night" enjoying heavy rotation on MTV. In 1989, the album was ranked number 89 on Rolling Stone magazine's "100 Best Albums of the Eighties" listing. At the time of its release, Franklin rated Who's Zoomin' Who? as one of her best albums.

== Background ==
In 1983, Franklin released her twenty-ninth studio album, Get It Right. Produced by singer Luther Vandross, following his successful teaming with the singer on her 1982 album, Jump to It, it spawned the Hot R&B/Hip-Hop Songs number-one hit "Get It Right" but became a moderate commercial success in the United States only where it peaked at number 36 on US Billboard 200. Franklin spent a great part of the following years in her hometown of Detroit, looking after her seriously ill father, the Reverend C. L. Franklin. After her father died in 1984, the singer began thinking about returning to the music scene. In an interview with Rolling Stone, Franklin said that following Get It Right, she wanted to do "a record with a younger sound to it. I'd been listening to the radio and I really liked what I heard. I figured to myself that it was time for me to do something serious."

Arista Records arranged a telephone conversation with producer and singer Narada Michael Walden to discuss working together on Franklin's next studio album. Since Franklin disliked traveling, Walden subsequently started assembling backing tracks in Los Angeles and brought the session tapes to Detroit, where Franklin added her vocals. According to Walden, Franklin "had to get reacquainted with being in the studio" following her hiatus but "it didn't take long for the singer to regain her form". Despite Franklin's reputation as a singer, Walden found her easy to work with, citing her a "black Mae West". Further elaborating on the recording process, he stated: "She'll sing a song down in the lower range maybe four or five times. Then she'll sing it up in her range and do two or three takes." Looking for a male singer to work with Franklin on the duet song "Push", Walden "put out signals, but a lot of people were frightened to death to sing" with Franklin. Former The J. Geils Band vocalist Peter Wolf, however, jumped at the chance.

== Critical reception ==
Professional ratings
Review scores
Source	Rating
AllMusic	3.5/5 stars
Robert Christgau	A
Tom Hull	A

Who's Zoomin' Who? received generally favorable reviews from music critics. AllMusic editor Craig Lytle called the album a return "in style" and praised the album for its singles as well as Franklin's vocal performance which he declared as "lively", "laudable" and "soulful". Lytle rated the album three and a half out of five stars. in his review for The Village Voice, Robert Christgau found that Franklin "hasn't done anything near this good in over a dozen [years]. It couldn't have happened without the top-forty revival, and it couldn't have happened without Narada Michael Walden, who unhesitatingly plugged his first legend into one pop format after another and came up with classics almost every time." Giving the album an A rating, he concluded that "from lead rocker to hooked ballad to Caribe Richie carnivalesque, these songs go no deeper than Franklin can make them by breathing, but their instant inevitability could keep this album alive for years."

Rolling Stone critic Vince Aletti wrote that "though Who's Zoomin' Who? never quite comes together as an album, Walden's ambitious eclecticism works cut by cut with few exceptions, and astonishingly, the hype is nearly justified: this is some of Aretha Franklin's best work since the 1960s." He felt that "the example of Tina Turner acted as goad and inspiration, and the edge of rich brashness in Aretha's performances seems sparked by Turner's electric drive [...] Zoomin' seems so anxious to cover all the angles that it scatters Aretha's energies rather than focusing them. Still, Franklin sweeps through this stylistic hodgepodge with more fire and verve than she's displayed in years. Even if this isn't her crossover breakthrough, there's enough vocal brilliance here to stun any listener within range." Similarly, People found that Franklin "has never sounded better than she does on this album" but criticized the project for being "less than it might have been". The magazine noted that while Walden has "a way of making mediocre singers sound better than they are, he also has a way of making wonderful singers sound less wonderful, putting them up against grinding soul-funk backgrounds with which even someone like Franklin has trouble competing. In 1989, Rolling Stone ranked Who's Zoomin' Who? 85th on its "100 Best Albums of the Eighties" listing.

== Chart performance ==
In the United States, Who's Zoomin' Who? peaked at number 13 on the Billboard 200, becoming Franklin's highest-charting album since Young, Gifted and Black had reached number 11 in 1972. It also reached number three on the Top R&B/Hip-Hop Albums chart. The singer's biggest commercial hit in years, the album reached gold status by August and was eventually certified platinum by the Recording Industry Association of America (RIAA) in December 1985, indicating sales in excess of 1.0 million copies. Franklin's biggest seller within her discography, it would remain her final album to enter the top 20 until the release of her 2014 album Aretha Franklin Sings the Great Diva Classics, which also peaked at number 13 and number three on the Billboard 200 and the Top R&B/Hip-Hop Albums.

In Canada and the United Kingdom, Who's Zoomin' Who? also ranks among Franklin's biggest-selling albums. It was certified platinum by Music Canada and silver by the British Phonographic Industry (BPI), while reaching number 13 on the Canadian and 49 on the British Albums Chart, respectively. Elsewhere, the album entered the top ten in New Zealand and Sweden, remaining Franklin's highest-charting album in both nations until her death in 2018, while making it to the top 20 in Australia and Norway. Who's Zoomin' Who? was considered Franklin's comeback album, with many journalist comparing its performance to Tina Turner's late career crossover success with her album Private Dancer (1984), and marked the start of several collaborations with Walden. With the album, the singer established herself as a star of music video, with popular videos for "Freeway of Love", "Sisters Are Doin' It for Themselves" and "Another Night" enjoying heavy rotation on MTV.

== Track listing ==
Side one
No.	Title	Writer(s)	Producer(s)	Length
1.	"Freeway of Love"	Jeffrey E. Cohen; Narada Michael Walden	Walden	5:52
2.	"Another Night"	Beppe Cantarelli; Roy Freeland	Walden	4:31
3.	"Sweet Bitter Love"	Van McCoy	Franklin	5:11
4.	"Who's Zoomin' Who"	Aretha Franklin; Preston Glass; Walden	Walden	4:44

Side two
No.	Title	Writer(s)	Producer(s)	Length
5.	"Sisters Are Doin' It for Themselves" (with Eurythmics)	Annie Lennox; David A. Stewart	Stewart	5:52
6.	"Until You Say You Love Me"	Glass; Walden	Walden	4:23
7.	"Ain't Nobody Ever Loved You"	Cohen; Walden	Walden	4:50
8.	"Push" (with Peter Wolf)	Cohen; Walden	Walden	4:35/5:34
9.	"Integrity"	Franklin	Franklin	4:24/5:33

2014 deluxe edition bonus tracks
No.	Title	Length
10.	"Freeway of Love" (Single mix)	4:07
11.	"Sisters Are Doin' It for Themselves" (Single mix)	4:31
12.	"Who's Zoomin' Who?" (Radio mix)	5:50
13.	"Another Night" (Radio mix)	5:06
14.	"Ain't Nobody Ever Loved You" (Single mix)	4:18

2014 deluxe edition bonus disc
No.	Title	Length
1.	"Freeway of Love" (Rock mix)	4:52
2.	"Freeway of Love" (Extended remix)	6:32
3.	"Sisters Are Doin' It for Themselves" (ET mix)	7:49
4.	"Who's Zoomin' Who?" (Dance mix)	8:36
5.	"Who's Zoomin' Who" (Dub mix)	5:23
6.	"Who's Zoomin' Who?" (Acappella mix)	5:32
7.	"Another Night" (Dance mix)	6:41
8.	"Another Night" (Dub mix)	6:58
9.	"Another Night" (Single mix)	4:08
10.	"Ain't Nobody Ever Loved You" (Remix)	6:25
11.	"Ain't Nobody Ever Loved You" (Dub mix)	7:01
12.	"Ain't Nobody Ever Loved You" (Percapella mix)	7:06

== Personnel ==
=== Musicians ===
- Aretha Franklin – vocals
- Walter Afanasieff – keyboards (1, 2, 4, 6–8)
- Preston Glass – keyboards (1, 2, 6–8), keyboard vibes (1)
- Nat Adderley Jr. – keyboards (3, 9)
- Robbie Kondor – synthesizer (3, 9)
- Annie Lennox – keyboards (5)
- David A. Stewart – keyboards (5), rhythm guitar (5)
- Benmont Tench – organ (5)
- Corrado Rustici – guitars (1, 2, 4, 6–8), guitar synthesizer (2)
- Ray Gomez – guitar solo (2)
- Doc Powell – guitars (3, 9)
- Steve Khan – guitars (3, 9)
- Mike Campbell – lead guitar (5)
- Carlos Santana – guitar solo (8)
- Randy Jackson – synth bass (1, 2, 4, 6, 8), bass (2, 7)
- Louis Johnson – bass (3, 9)
- Nathan East – bass (5)
- Narada Michael Walden – drums (1, 2, 4, 6–8), percussion (1, 2, 6–8), acoustic piano (4), keyboards (7)
- Yogi Horton – drums (3, 9)
- Stan Lynch – drums (5)
- Steve Kroon – percussion (3, 9)
- Gigi Gonaway – tambourine (1)
- The Santana Rhythm Section – percussion (1, 7)
- Andy Narell – steel drums (7)
- Clarence Clemons – saxophone solo (1)
- Dizzy Gillespie – trumpet solo (9)
- Paul Riser – string arrangements (3, 9)

Background and guest vocals

- Kitty Beethoven – backing vocals (1, 2, 7)
- Carolyn Franklin – backing vocals (1, 4)
- Jim Gilstrap – backing vocals (1, 2, 4, 6, 7)
- Preston Glass – backing vocals (1, 2, 4, 6, 7)
- Vicki Randle – backing vocals (1, 2, 4, 6, 7)
- Sylvester – backing vocals (1, 2, 4, 6, 7)
- Jeanie Tracy – backing vocals (1, 2, 4, 6–8)
- Martha Wash – backing vocals (1)
- Laundon Von Hendricks – backing vocals (1, 2, 4, 7, 8)
- Nikita Germaine – backing vocals (2)
- Randy Jackson – backing vocals (2, 4)
- Annie Lennox – vocals (5)
- The Charles Williams Singers – choir (5)
- Peter Wolf – vocals (8)
- Karen Benington – backing vocals (8)
- Craig Thomas – backing vocals (8)
- Margaret Branch – backing vocals (9)
- Brenda Corbett – backing vocals (9)
- Sandra Feva – backing vocals (9)

=== Production and technical ===
- Clive Davis – executive producer
- Narada Michael Walden – producer (1, 2, 4, 6–8)
- Aretha Franklin – producer (3, 9)
- David A. Stewart – producer (5), mixing (5)
- David Frazer – chief engineer (1, 2, 6–8)
- Mike Iacopelli – engineer (3, 9)
- Josh Abbey – string session engineer (3, 9)
- Don Smith – engineer (5), mixing (5)
- Adam Williams – engineer (5)
- Shelly Yakus – drum recording (5)
- Michael H. Brauer – additional mixing (1, 2, 6–8)
- Dana Jon Chappelle – second engineer (1, 2, 6–8)
- Tim Crich – second engineer (1, 2, 6–8)
- Maureen Droney – second engineer (1, 2, 6–8)
- Paul Hamingson – second engineer (1, 2, 6–8)
- Gordon Logan – second engineer (1, 2, 6–8)
- Moira Marquis – second engineer (1, 2, 6–8)
- Ray Pyle – second engineer (1, 2, 6–8)
- Dominick Celani – assistant engineer (3, 9)
- Jay Willis – assistant engineer (5)
- Greg Calbi – mastering at Sterling Sound (New York, NY)
- Stephen Marcussen – original mastering (5) at Precision Lacquer (Hollywood, California)
- Sephra Herman – production coordination (3, 9)

=== Artwork ===
- Donn Davenport – art direction
- Artis Lane – paintings
- John Pinderhughes – photography
- Jane Hoffman Davenport – make-up
- Webster McKnight – hair
- Carol Williams – stylist

== Charts ==
=== Weekly charts ===
Weekly chart performance for Who's Zoomin' Who?
Chart (1985–1986)	Peak position
Australian Albums (Kent Music Report)	15
Canada Top Albums/CDs (RPM)	13
Dutch Albums (Album Top 100)	50
European Albums (Eurotipsheet)	42
Finnish Albums (Suomen virallinen lista)	34
German Albums (Offizielle Top 100)	46
New Zealand Albums (RMNZ)	6
Norwegian Albums (VG-lista)	15
Swedish Albums (Sverigetopplistan)	8
Swiss Albums (Schweizer Hitparade)	21
UK Albums (Official Charts)	49
US Billboard 200	13
US Top R&B/Hip-Hop Albums (Billboard)	3

=== Year-end charts ===
1985 year-end chart performance for Who's Zoomin' Who?
Chart (1985)	Position
Australian Albums (Kent Music Report)	75

1986 year-end chart performance for Who's Zoomin' Who?
Chart (1986)	Position
US Billboard 200	46
US Top R&B/Hip-Hop Albums (Billboard)	18

== Certifications ==
Certifications for Who's Zoomin' Who?
Region	Certification	Certified units/sales
Canada (Music Canada)	Platinum	100,000^{^}
New Zealand (RMNZ)	Gold	7,500^{^}
United Kingdom (BPI)	Silver	60,000^{^}
United States (RIAA)	Platinum	1,000,000^{^}
^{^} Shipments figures based on certification alone.
