= Aretha (1986 album) =

1986 studio album by Aretha Franklin

Studio album by Aretha Franklin
- Released: October 27, 1986
- Recorded: 1986
- Studios: Tarpan Studios (San Rafael, California); Record Plant (Los Angeles, California); The Automatt (San Francisco, California); Studio D Recording (Sausalito, California); Hitsville U.S.A., Hollywood, California; Sigma Sound Studios and Electric Lady Studios (New York City, New York); United Sound Systems (Detroit, Michigan)
- Genres: Pop; rock; R&B
- Length: 45:26
- Label: Arista
- Producers: Narada Michael Walden; Keith Richards; Aretha Franklin

Aretha Franklin chronology
Who's Zoomin' Who? (1985)	Aretha (1986)	One Lord, One Faith, One Baptism (1987)

Singles from Aretha
- 1. "Jumpin' Jack Flash" Released: September 1986; 2. "Jimmy Lee" Released: November 1986; 3. "I Knew You Were Waiting (For Me)" Released: January 1987; 4. "Rock-A-Lott" Released: June 1987; 5. "If You Need My Love Tonight" Released: 1987

Professional ratings
Review scores
Source	Rating
AllMusic	2/5 stars
Robert Christgau	B−

Aretha is the thirty-first studio album by American singer Aretha Franklin, released in late 1986 by Arista Records. It is the third album with the Aretha title to be released by Franklin, following her 1961 album and 1980 album.

== Background ==
As with Franklin's previous album, Who's Zoomin' Who?, Aretha was produced mainly by Narada Michael Walden and includes her duet with George Michael, "I Knew You Were Waiting (For Me)", which became Franklin's first #1 Pop single since "Respect" in 1967, and would also be her last. The album also yielded three other hit singles: "Jimmy Lee", "Rock-A-Lott" and a hard rock cover of The Rolling Stones' classic, "Jumpin' Jack Flash". All music videos were popular on MTV, BET and other video outlets.

Franklin's vocal from "Rock-A-Lott" was sampled extensively in the 49ers' 1990 hit "Touch Me", while her version of "Jumpin' Jack Flash" was the title song for the comedy film of the same name starring Whoopi Goldberg. All four of the singles were shot as music videos that received extensive play.

The album cover was Andy Warhol's final work before his death in early 1987.

The album was remastered and re-released as an "Expanded Edition" in December 2014 by Funky Town Grooves, with bonus tracks and a second CD of material.

== Commercial performance ==
Following Franklin's first-ever Platinum record, Who's Zoomin' Who?, Aretha was certified Gold by the RIAA, after only several weeks on the market. It eventually moved 900,000 copies.

This marked Franklin's ninth Gold album in the United States.

== Track listing ==
Aretha track listing
No.	Title	Writer(s)	Producer	Length
1.	"Jimmy Lee"	Narada Michael Walden; Jeffrey Cohen; Preston Glass; Anukampa Lisa Walden	N.M. Walden	5:47
2.	"I Knew You Were Waiting (For Me)" (with George Michael)	Simon Climie; Dennis Morgan	N.M. Walden	4:01
3.	"Do You Still Remember"	P. Glass; Walter Afanasieff; Cohen	N.M. Walden	5:10
4.	"Jumpin' Jack Flash"	Mick Jagger; Keith Richards	Richards	5:10
5.	"Rock-A-Lott"	N.M. Walden; Joe Johnson; P. Glass	N.M. Walden	6:21
6.	"An Angel Cries"	Climie; Morgan	N.M. Walden	4:59
7.	"He'll Come Along"	Aretha Franklin	Franklin	4:11
8.	"If You Need My Love Tonight" (with Larry Graham)	N.M. Walden; P. Glass; Alan Glass	N.M. Walden	4:30
9.	"Look to the Rainbow"	Burton Lane; E. Y. Harburg	Franklin	5:14

2014 "Expanded Edition" CD1 bonus tracks
No.	Title	Length
10.	"Rock-A-Lott" (Single Mix)	4:41
11.	"Rock-A-Lott" (Radio Edit)	5:32
12.	"Rock-A-Lott" (Street Mix)	9:26
13.	"Rock-A-Lott" (Dub)	6:40
14.	"Rock-A-Lott" (Acapella)	6:59

2014 "Expanded Edition" CD2
No.	Title	Length
1.	"If You Need My Love Tonight" (mislabeled as "An Angel Cries" 7" mix)	4:34
2.	"I Knew You Were Waiting (For Me)" (Instrumental)	4:03
3.	"I Knew You Were Waiting (For Me)" (Edited Remix)	5:31
4.	"I Knew You Were Waiting (For Me)" (Percapella)	5:17
5.	"I Knew You Were Waiting (For Me)" (Extended Remix)	7:27
6.	"Jimmy Lee" (Extended Version)	7:19
7.	"Jimmy Lee" (Dub Version)	6:14
8.	"Jumpin' Jack Flash" (7" Mix)	4:30
9.	"Jumpin' Jack Flash" (Street Mix)	6:11
10.	"Jumpin' Jack Flash" (Edited Street Mix)	4:40
11.	"Jumpin' Jack Flash" (Master Dub Mix)	4:36
12.	"Jumpin' Jack Flash" (Beat Dub Mix)	4:13
13.	"Aretha Megamix" (Who's Zoomin' Who / Another Night / Integrity / Freeway of Love)	7:48

== Personnel ==
=== Musicians ===
- Aretha Franklin – vocals, acoustic piano (4)
- Walter Afanasieff – acoustic piano (1), synthesizers (1–3, 5, 6), programming (2, 3), keyboards (8)
- David Sancious – synthesizers (1), harp (3), synth horns (5)
- Chuck Leavell – keyboards (4)
- Nick Johnson – keyboards (7)
- Nat Adderley Jr. – keyboards (9)
- Corrado Rustici – Charvel GTM6 MIDI guitar synthesizer (1, 2, 5), guitars (8)
- Keith Richards – lead guitar (4)
- Allen Rogan – guitars (4)
- Ronnie Wood – guitars (4)
- Vernon "Ice" Black – end funk guitar (6)
- Teddy F. White – rhythm guitar (6)
- Greg Poree – guitars (7)
- David T. Walker – guitars (7)
- Doc Powell – guitars (9)
- Randy Jackson – acoustic bass (1), bass guitar (2, 4), 5-string bass (3, 6), Moog bass (5), bass (8)
- James Jamerson, Jr. – bass (7)
- Francisco Centeno – bass (9)
- Narada Michael Walden – drums (1, 2, 5, 6, 8), acoustic piano intro (1), acoustic drums (3), programming (6), percussion (8)
- Steve Jordan – drums (4)
- James Gadson – drums (7)
- Yogi Horton – drums (9)
- Preston Glass – bells (1, 3), percussion programming (2), keyboards (8)
- Gigi Gonaway – tambourine (2), percussion (2, 5), timbales (5)
- Jason Martin – cymbals (5)
- Raul Rekow – congas (6), shekere (6)
- Orestes Vilato – timbales (6), cowbell (6)
- Daryl "Munyungo" Jackson – percussion (7)
- Marc Russo – alto saxophone (1)
- Kenny G – tenor saxophone (1)
- Eddie Mininfield – tenor saxophone (5)
- David Wallace – trombone (1)
- Jerry Hey – trumpet (1)
- Ernie Fields Jr. – horns (7)
- Charles Veal – strings (7)
- Sanford Allen – strings (9)

Music arrangements

- Narada Michael Walden – arrangements (1–3, 5, 6, 8)
- Jerry Hey – horn arrangements (1), string arrangements (2, 3, 6, 8)
- Gil Askey – horn, rhythm and string arrangements (7); conductor (7)
- Paul Riser – horn, rhythm and string arrangements (9)

Background and Guest vocals

- George Michael – vocals (2)
- Kitty Beethoven – backing vocals (2, 5, 6)
- Kevin Dorsey – backing vocals (2, 3, 5, 6)
- Jim Gilstrap – backing vocals (2, 3, 5, 6)
- Jennifer Hall – backing vocals (2, 3, 5, 6)
- Myrna Matthews – backing vocals (2, 3, 6)
- Claytoven Richardson – backing vocals (2, 5)
- Jeanie Tracy – backing vocals (2, 3, 6)
- Ortheia Barnds – backing vocals (4)
- Margaret Branch – backing vocals (4, 7)
- Brenda Corbett – backing vocals (4, 7)
- Liz Jackson – backing vocals (6)
- Esther Ridgeway – backing vocals (7)
- Gloria Ridgeway – backing vocals (7)
- Larry Graham – vocals (8)

Rockin' Crew on "Rock-a-Lott"

- Dana Joe Chappelle
- Greg "Gigi" Gonaway
- Janice Lee
- Cynthia Shiloh
- Anukampa Lisa Walden

=== Production ===
- Narada Michael Walden – producer (1–3, 5, 6, 8)
- Keith Richards – producer (4)
- Aretha Franklin – producer (7, 9)
- Marion Sherrill – music supervisor (7)
- Sephra Herman – music contractor (9)
- Steven Shmerler – art direction
- Maude Gilman – design, layout
- John Pinderhughes – photography
- Andy Warhol – front cover art and line drawings

Technical credits

- David Frazier – recording (1–3, 5, 6, 8), mixing (1–3, 5, 6, 8)
- Steve Lillywhite – engineer (4)
- Michael Frondelli – mixing (4)
- Russ Terrana – engineer (7)
- Jim Dougherty – engineer (9)
- Dana Jon Chappelle – assistant engineer (1–3, 5, 6, 8), additional engineer (2, 5)
- Mark Roule – assistant engineer (9)
- Maureen Droney – additional assistant engineer (1–3, 5, 6, 8), additional engineer (2)
- Stuart Hirotsu – additional assistant engineer (1–3, 5, 6, 8)
- Mike Iacopelli – additional assistant engineer (1–3, 5, 6, 8), assistant engineer (4), vocal engineer (7, 9), mixing (7, 9)
- Gordon Lyon – additional assistant engineer (1–3, 5, 6, 8), additional engineer (3)
- Jim "Watts" Vereecke – additional assistant engineer (1–3, 5, 6, 8)
- Lenette Viegas – additional assistant engineer (1–3, 5, 6, 8)

== Charts and certifications ==
Chart performance for Aretha
Chart (1986–1987)	Peak position
Australian Albums (Kent Music Report)	33
Canada Top Albums/CDs (RPM)	56
Dutch Albums (Album Top 100)	60
European Albums (Music & Media)	80
German Albums (Offizielle Top 100)	45
New Zealand Albums (RMNZ)	20
Norwegian Albums (VG-lista)	12
Swedish Albums (Sverigetopplistan)	12
Swiss Albums (Schweizer Hitparade)	23
UK Albums (Official Charts)	51
US Billboard 200	32
US Top R&B/Hip-Hop Albums (Billboard)	7

=== Certifications ===
Region	Certification	Certified units/sales
Canada (Music Canada)	Gold	50,000^{^}
United States (RIAA)	Gold	500,000^{^}
^{^} Shipments figures based on certification alone.
