= Jump to It =

1982 studio album by Aretha Franklin

Studio album by Aretha Franklin
- Released: July 26, 1982
- Studios: Mediasound Studios (New York City, New York); Record Plant and The Village Recorder (Los Angeles, California); Soundsuite (Detroit, Michigan)
- Genre: Synth-funk
- Length: 42:40
- Label: Arista
- Producers: Luther Vandross; Aretha Franklin

Aretha Franklin chronology
Love All the Hurt Away (1981)	Jump to It (1982)	Get It Right (1983)

Singles from Jump to It
- 1. "Jump to It" Released: June 1982; 2. "Love Me Right" Released: 1982; 3. "This Is for Real" Released: 1983

Professional ratings
Review scores
Source	Rating
AllMusic	3/5 stars
Robert Christgau	B+
Rolling Stone	4/5 stars

Jump to It is the twenty-eighth studio album by American singer Aretha Franklin, produced by Luther Vandross and released in mid 1982 by Arista Records.

== Background ==
Jump to It gave Franklin her tenth number-one R&B album – then the all-time record. It enjoyed a seven-week run at number one on Billboard's R&B albums chart and also reached number 23 on Billboard's Pop albums chart. It was hailed as a comeback, given that it provided Franklin with her first Gold-certified disc and Top 40 Pop entry since Sparkle in 1976.

The title track, "Jump to It", was Franklin's first Top 40 Pop hit since 1976, and her first R&B chart topper since 1977's "Break It to Me Gently". "Jump to It" was nominated for a Grammy Award. The LP itself received an American Music Award for Best Soul Album in 1983.

== Commercial performance ==
On February 1, 1983, Jump to It was certified Gold by the RIAA. Franklin was presented her framed Gold record in Detroit by her long-time friends the Four Tops.

== Reception ==
Armond White of Spin complained about "Luther Vandross's piss-elegant Jump to It, which, despite the lively title track, mistakenly bent Aretha into Dionne Warwick postures amid the iciness of the Chic background singers."

== Track listing ==
No.	Title	Writer(s)	Length
1.	"Jump to It"	Luther Vandross, Marcus Miller	6:40
2.	"Love Me Right"	Vandross	4:10
3.	"If She Don't Want Your Lovin'"	Sam Dees	5:36
4.	"This Is for Real"	Vandross	4:45
5.	"(It's Just) Your Love"	Vandross, Miller	4:10
6.	"I Wanna Make It Up to You"	Aretha Franklin	6:00
7.	"It's Your Thing"	O'Kelly Isley, Ronald Isley, Rudolph Isley	4:10
8.	"Just My Daydream"	Smokey Robinson	5:55

2012 Reissue Bonus Tracks
No.	Title	Writer(s)	Length
9.	"Jump to It" (Single Version)	Vandross, Miller	4:17
10.	"Love Me Right" (Single Version)	Vandross	3:35
11.	"This Is for Real" (Single Version)	Vandross	4:37
12.	"Just My Daydream" (12" Version)	Robinson	4:35
13.	"Love Me Right" (Dance Version)	Vandross	5:48

== Personnel ==
=== Performers ===
Musicians

- Aretha Franklin – lead vocals
- Nat Adderley Jr. – keyboards (1, 3–8)
- Marcus Miller – synthesizers (1), bass (1, 2, 4–7), keyboards (2)
- Luther Vandross – keyboards (2)
- George Duke – acoustic piano (5)
- Reginald "Sonny" Burke – keyboards (8)
- Doc Powell – guitars
- Steve Love – guitar solo (7)
- Francisco Centeno – bass (3)
- Louis Johnson – bass (8)
- Yogi Horton – drums (1, 3–8)
- Buddy Williams – drums (2)
- Errol "Crusher" Bennett – congas (1), percussion (3–5, 8)
- Paulinho da Costa – percussion (7)
- George Young – soprano sax solo (4)

Background vocalists

- Tawatha Agee – backing vocals (1, 2)
- Phillip Ballou – backing vocals (1, 2)
- Michelle Cobbs – backing vocals (1, 2)
- Fonzi Thornton – backing vocals (1, 2)
- Luther Vandross – backing vocals (1, 2, 5)
- Brenda White – backing vocals (1, 2)
- Cissy Houston – backing vocals (1, 3, 5, 8)
- Norma Jean Wright – backing vocals (2)
- Alexandra Brown – backing vocals (3)
- Darlene Love – backing vocals (3, 5, 8)
- Paulette McWilliams – backing vocals (3)
- Stephanie Spruill – backing vocals (3, 5, 8)
- Brenda Corbett – backing vocals (5, 7)
- Four Tops – backing vocals (6)
- Levi Stubbs – lead vocals (6)
- Sandra Dance – backing vocals (7)
- Erma Franklin – backing vocals (7)
- Pam Vincent – backing vocals (7)

Music arrangements

- Marcus Miller – synthesizer and rhythm arrangements (1)
- Luther Vandross – rhythm arrangements (2, 4, 5, 7), vocal arrangements (2, 3, 5, 8)
- Paul Riser – string arrangements (2, 4, 6), horn arrangements (4, 6)
- Nat Adderley Jr. – rhythm arrangements (3–8)
- Leon Pendarvis – horn and string arrangements (3, 5, 8)
- Aretha Franklin – rhythm and vocal arrangements (6–8)
- Four Tops – vocal arrangements (6)
- Jerry Hey – horn and string arrangements (7)

=== Production ===
- Luther Vandross – producer (1–5, 7, 8)
- Aretha Franklin – producer (6)
- Michael H. Brauer – recording, mixing
- Carl Beatty – additional engineer
- Lee Keifer – additional engineer
- Michael Christopher – assistant engineer
- Karat Faye – assistant engineer
- John Hanlon – assistant engineer
- Harry Spiridakis – assistant engineer
- Don Wershba – assistant engineer
- Warren Woods – assistant engineer
- Bob Ludwig – mastering at Masterdisk (New York, NY)
- Sephra Herman – production coordinator, music contractor
- Trevor Veitch – music contractor
- Ria Lewerke-Shapiro – art direction, design
- Harry Langdon – photography
- Sue Reilly – lettering

== Charts ==
Chart (1989)	Peak position
US Billboard 200	23
US Top R&B/Hip-Hop Albums (Billboard)	1

== See also ==
- List of number-one R&B albums of 1982 (U.S.)
