= Get It Right (Aretha Franklin song) =

1983 single by Aretha Franklin

Single by Aretha Franklin

from the album Get It Right
- Released: June 1983
- Recorded: 1983
- Genre: R&B; synth-funk
- Length: 6:22
- Label: Arista
- Songwriter(s): Luther Vandross, Marcus Miller
- Producer(s): Luther Vandross

Aretha Franklin singles chronology
"This Is for Real" (1983)	"Get It Right" (1983)	"Every Girl (Wants My Guy)" (1983)

"Get It Right" is an R&B song written by Luther Vandross and Marcus Miller that was a hit for Aretha Franklin in 1983. Released from her album of the same title, it replaced Donna Summer at #1 on the Hot Soul Singles chart in August 1983 but stalled at number 61 on the Billboard Hot 100 and #65 in Cash Box.

The single reached number nine on the Hot Dance Club Play chart and number 74 on the UK Singles Chart.

== Personnel ==
- Aretha Franklin - vocals
- Doc Powell, Georg Wadenius - guitar
- Marcus Miller - bass, synthesizer
- Nat Adderley, Jr. - keyboards
- Yogi Horton - drums
- Paulinho da Costa - percussion
- Steve Kroon - congas, triangle
- Dave Friedman - vibraphone
- Luther Vandross, Brenda White King, Fonzi Thornton, Michelle Cobbs, Phillip Ballou, Tawatha Agee, Yvonne Lewis - backing vocals
