= Get It Right (album) =

1983 studio album by Aretha Franklin

Studio album by Aretha Franklin
- Released: July 12, 1983
- Studios: Mediasound Studios (New York, NY); United Sound Systems (Detroit, MI); Record Plant (Los Angeles, CA)
- Genre: R&B
- Length: 39:53
- Label: Arista
- Producer: Luther Vandross

Aretha Franklin chronology
Jump to It (1982)	Get It Right (1983)	Who's Zoomin' Who? (1985)

Singles from Get It Right
- 1. "Get It Right" Released: 1983; 2. "Every Girl (Wants My Guy)" Released: 1983

Professional ratings
Review scores
Source	Rating
AllMusic	3/5 stars
Robert Christgau	B+
Rolling Stone	2/5 stars

Get It Right is the twenty-ninth studio album by American singer Aretha Franklin, released in mid 1983 by Arista Records. It was produced by Luther Vandross, following his successful teaming with the singer for the Gold-certified album, Jump to It, in 1982. Get It Right was not commercially successful, and Franklin did not have Vandross produce any further albums.

The disc's title song became a number 1 hit on Billboard's R&B singles chart, but it stalled at only number 61 on the Billboard Hot 100. The album was a critical and commercial failure, selling about 200,000 copies in the US. It was re-issued on compact disc in the late 1990s.

== Track listing ==
All tracks written by Luther Vandross and Marcus Miller; except where noted.

1. "Get It Right" – 6:22
2. "Pretender" – 4:17
3. "Every Girl (Wants My Guy)" – 6:29
4. "When You Love Me Like That" – 3:47
5. "I Wish It Would Rain" (Barrett Strong, Norman Whitfield, Roger Penzabene) – 4:40
6. "Better Friends Than Lovers" (Michael Lovesmith) – 4:10
7. "I Got Your Love" (Luther Vandross) – 5:30
8. "Giving In" (Clarence Franklin) – 4:38

== Personnel ==
=== Performers ===
Musicians

- Aretha Franklin – lead vocals
- Nat Adderley Jr. – keyboards
- Marcus Miller – synthesizers (1–4), bass
- Doc Powell – guitars
- Georg Wadenius – guitars (1–7)
- Teddy F. White – guitars (8)
- Yogi Horton – drums
- Paulinho da Costa – percussion (1–5, 8), congas (5), bongos (8)
- Steve Kroon – congas (1–3, 7), triangle (1)
- Dave Friedman – vibraphone (1, 3)
- Dave Carey – timpani (5)
- George Young – soprano sax solo (8)

Music arrangements

- Marcus Miller – rhythm arrangements (1–4)
- Luther Vandross – vocal arrangements (1–4, 7, 8)
- Rob Mounsey – string arrangements (2, 4), horn arrangements (4)
- Aretha Franklin – vocal arrangements (3, 6)
- Nat Adderley Jr. – rhythm arrangements (5–8)
- Paul Riser – string and horn arrangements (5–8)
- Michael Love Smith – vocal arrangements (6)

Background vocalists

- Tawatha Agee – backing vocals (1, 2)
- Phillip Ballou – backing vocals (1, 2)
- Michelle Cobbs – backing vocals (1, 2)
- Fonzi Thornton – backing vocals (1, 2)
- Luther Vandross – backing vocals (1, 2, 4, 7, 8)
- Brenda White – backing vocals (1)
- Yvonne Lewis – backing vocals (1, 2)
- Aretha Franklin – backing vocals (3)
- Cissy Houston – backing vocals (4, 7, 8)
- Darlene Love – backing vocals (4, 7)
- Paulette McWilliams – backing vocals (4, 7, 8)
- Margaret Branch – backing vocals (5)
- Brenda Corbett – backing vocals (5)
- Sandra Richardson – backing vocals (5)
- Danny Dedusual Smith – backing vocals (6)
- Michael Love Smith – backing vocals (6)
- Aaron T. Smith – backing vocals (6)
- Myrna Smith – backing vocals (7, 8)

Horns and Strings

- Ronnie Cuber, Lou Marini, George Young, Tom Malone, Jim Pugh, Jon Faddis, Alan Rubin, Lew Soloff, John Clark, Peter Gordon and Gregory Williams – horns (4–8)
- Jonathan Abramowitz, Sanford Allen, Lamar Alsop, Julien Barber, Elena Barere, John Beal, Alfred Brown, Jean R. Dane, Lewis Eley, Barry Finclair, Winterton Garvey, Judy Geist, Regis Iandiorio, Kathryn Kienke, Harold Kohon, Jesse Levy, Guy Lumia, Homer Mensch, Kermit Moore, Jan Mullen, John Pintavalle, Sue Pray, Joseph Rabushka, Margaret Ross, Richard Sortomme, Emanuel Vardi, Marilyn Wright, Richard Young and Harry Zaratzian – strings (2–8)

=== Production ===
- Luther Vandross – producer
- Michael H. Brauer – recording, mixing
- Don Cuminale – maintenance engineer
- Michael Christopher – additional engineer, assistant engineer
- Mark Cobrin – assistant engineer
- Paul Brocek – additional assistant engineer
- Sephra Herman – production coordinator, music contractor
- Donn Davenport – art direction
- Howard Fritzson – design
- Francisco Scavullo – photography
- Andre Douglas – hair stylist
- Carlton B. Northern – hair stylist
- Way Bandy – make-up
- Rachel Crespin – wardrobe
