= Who's Zoomin' Who =

Single by Aretha Franklin

from the album Who's Zoomin' Who?
- B-side: "Sweet Bitter Love"
- Released: August 27, 1985
- Recorded: 1985
- Studio: The Automatt (San Francisco, CA); United Sound Systems (Detroit, MI); Record Plant (Sausalito, CA); Right Track Recording (New York, NY)
- Genre: Electro; R&B; dance-pop
- Length: 4:44
- Label: Arista
- Songwriters: Aretha Franklin; Preston Glass; Narada Michael Walden
- Producer: Narada Michael Walden

Aretha Franklin singles chronology
"Freeway of Love" (1985)	"Who's Zoomin' Who" (1985)	"Sisters Are Doin' It for Themselves" (1985)

"Who's Zoomin' Who" is a song performed by American singer Aretha Franklin. It was written by Franklin, Preston Glass, and Narada Michael Walden for her thirtieth studio album of the same name (1985), with production overseen by Walden. The hit song was released as the album's second single on August 27, 1985, by Arista Records. It served as the follow-up single to Franklin's chart-topping smash "Freeway of Love", reaching number 7 on the US Billboard Hot 100 chart that same year, and at the same time spending four weeks at number two spot on the Hot Black Singles chart. Elsewhere, the dance pop song entered the top twenty in Ireland and the United Kingdom.

== Reception ==
Armond White of Spin wrote the song, "may lack the weight of Aretha's golden hits, but at least acknowledge[s] that love is not smooth. The confectionary style of the song allows Aretha to pitch this message directly to the young audience who want a relevant, modern sound from her."

== Personnel ==
- Aretha Franklin – lead vocals
- Walter "Baby Love" Afanasieff – keyboards
- Corrado Rustici – guitar
- Randy "The King" Jackson – synth bass, backing vocals
- Narada Michael Walden – drums, acoustic piano
- Preston "Tiger Head" Glass, Carolyn Franklin, Jim Gilstrap, Vicki Randle, Sylvester, Jeanie Tracy, Laundon Von Hendricks – backing vocals

== Charts ==
Chart (1985–1986)	Peak position
Australia (ARIA)	38
Europe (European Hot 100 Singles)	22
Germany (GfK)	42
Ireland (IRMA)	12
Netherlands (Single Top 100)	39
New Zealand (Recorded Music NZ)	23
UK Singles (OCC)	11
US Adult Contemporary (Billboard)	10
US Billboard Hot 100	7
US Dance Club Songs (Billboard)	1
US Hot Black Singles (Billboard)	2

Year-end chart (1985)	Rank
US Top Pop Singles (Billboard)	94
