= Freeway of Love =

1985 single by Aretha Franklin

Single by Aretha Franklin

from the album Who's Zoomin' Who?
- B-side: "Until You Say You Love Me"
- Released: June 5, 1985
- Recorded: 1984
- Studio: The Automatt (San Francisco, CA); United Sound Systems (Detroit, MI); Record Plant (Sausalito, CA); Right Track Recording (New York, NY)
- Genre: R&B; dance-pop; synth-pop
- Length: 5:51 (album version); 4:10 (single version)
- Label: Arista
- Songwriters: Jeffrey Cohen; Narada Michael Walden
- Producer: Narada Michael Walden

Aretha Franklin singles chronology
"Every Girl (Wants My Guy)" (1983)	"Freeway of Love" (1985)	"Who's Zoomin' Who" (1985)

Music video
- "Freeway of Love" by Aretha Franklin on YouTube

Audio
- "Freeway of Love" (single version) on YouTube
- "Freeway of Love" (extended remix) on YouTube

"Freeway of Love" is a song by American singer Aretha Franklin. It was written by Jeffrey Cohen and Narada Michael Walden and produced by the latter for Franklin's thirtieth studio album, Who's Zoomin' Who? (1985). The song features a notable contribution from Clarence Clemons, the saxophonist from Bruce Springsteen’'s E Street Band. Sylvester, Martha Wash, and Jeanie Tracy provided backup vocals on "Freeway of Love".

Released as the album's lead single on June 5, 1985, by Arista Records, the song became Franklin's highest-charting single in twelve years. It reached number three on the Billboard Hot 100 chart, while topping the Hot Black Singles chart for five weeks from July 27 to August 24, 1985 (her milestone twentieth number-one hit on the chart). In a remixed "rock" version, the song also topped the Hot Dance Music/Club Play chart. The accompanying promotional music video was filmed entirely in the Detroit, Michigan area, and became one of the most popular videos of the year. "Freeway of Love" earned Franklin her 12th Grammy Award for Best Female R&B Vocal Performance.

Owing to the pink Cadillac appearing on the cover art and several times in the lyrics, more than 100 pink Cadillacs accompanied Franklin in her funeral procession in August 2018.

== Music video ==
The video, directed by British filmmaker Brian Grant, was filmed primarily in black and white. It was filmed at Club Tattoo on Woodbridge Avenue (which Franklin co-owned) and is mostly a performance video. Franklin's "Another Night" music video was also filmed there. "Freeway of Love" is interspersed with videos of automobiles being manufactured in the early 1970s (Ford Mustang) and a then-current Cadillac Cimarron, the exterior of the original Motown headquarters, "Hitsville U.S.A." at 2648 West Grand Blvd. in Detroit, as well as dancers in and around cars, sky shots of freeways, the Detroit skyline, and other ephemeral visuals. Portions of the "Freeway of Love" video were also filmed at Doug's Body Shop, located at 22061 Woodward Avenue, in Ferndale, Michigan. Clarence Clemons is featured in the video and performs saxophone on the song.

Although the video is set to the original version of the song, the tempo of the song is noticeably faster in the video.

== Reception ==
John Leland of Spin wrote, "While the rote mid-tempo rocker doesn't give Aretha a chance to get loose and do Niki Hokey, she still proves that she's a true national treasure, turning mere words — and bad ones at that — into powerful intimations, invitations, and sonic gyrations." Armond White added, "This is also a highway of life song, proclaiming Aretha's longevity and the pleasure she's found in taking a brisk, easy pace. Aretha ends with a rousing jam that confirms her as the mother/master of much that is current. She's still the Queen of Soul."

== Track listing ==
US 7" Single

No.	Title	Length
1.	"Freeway of Love"	4:09
2.	"Until You Say You Love Me"	4:55

== Personnel ==
- Aretha Franklin – lead vocals
- Walter "Baby Love" Afanasieff – keyboards
- Preston "Tiger Head" Glass – keyboards and keyboard vibes, backing vocals
- Corrado Rustici – guitar
- Randy "The King" Jackson – synth bass
- Narada Michael Walden – drums and percussion
- Greg "Gigi" Gonaway – tambourine
- Mingo Lewis – congas, percussion
- The Santana Rhythm Section – percussion
- Clarence Clemons – saxophone, guest appearance (courtesy of Columbia Records)
- Karen "Kitty Beethoven" Brewington, Carolyn Franklin, Jim Gilstrap, Sylvester, Vicki Randle, Jeanie Tracy, Martha Wash, Laundon Von Hendricks – backing vocals

== Charts ==
=== Weekly charts ===
Chart (1985–1986)	Peak position
Australia (Kent Music Report)	6
Belgium (Ultratop 50 Flanders)	27
Canada (The Record)	6
Netherlands (Dutch Top 40)	31
Netherlands (Single Top 100)	27
New Zealand (Recorded Music NZ)	3
Sweden (Sverigetopplistan)	16
UK Singles (OCC)	51
US Billboard Hot 100	3
US Adult Contemporary (Billboard)	11
US Dance Club Songs (Billboard)	1
US Hot Black Singles (Billboard)	1

=== Year-end charts ===
Chart (1985)	Position
Australia (Kent Music Report)	65
US Top Pop Singles (Billboard)	43
US Hot Black Singles	7

== Cover versions ==
- In 1986, "Weird Al" Yankovic covered the song as part of his polka medley "Polka Party!".
- The song was covered in 2009 by house music/dance singer Pepper Mashay.
