= I Knew You Were Waiting (For Me) =

Single by Aretha Franklin and George Michael

from the album Aretha
- B-side: "I Knew You Were Waiting (For Me)" (instrumental)
- Released: January 19, 1987
- Recorded: May 1986
- Genre: Dance-pop; gospel; soul
- Length: 4:01
- Label: Arista
- Songwriters: Simon Climie; Dennis Morgan
- Producer: Narada Michael Walden

Aretha Franklin singles chronology
"Jimmy Lee" (1987)	"I Knew You Were Waiting (For Me)" (1987)	"Rock-A-Lott" (1987)

George Michael singles chronology
"A Different Corner" (1986)	"I Knew You Were Waiting (For Me)" (1987)	"I Want Your Sex" (1987)

Music video
- "I Knew You Were Waiting (For Me)" on YouTube

"I Knew You Were Waiting (For Me)" is a song by American singer Aretha Franklin and English singer George Michael, released on January 19, 1987, by Arista Records in the United States and Canada as the second single from Franklin's thirty-first studio album, Aretha (1986). Written by Simon Climie and Dennis Morgan and produced by Narada Michael Walden, the song topped the Billboard Hot 100 chart, and marked Franklin's second and last number one single in the US. The song was Franklin's biggest hit on the Billboard Adult Contemporary chart, reaching number two. In the rest of the world, Michael's label Epic Records released the song as a non-album single, and it reached number one on the UK singles chart, Franklin's only number one placing in the United Kingdom.

"I Knew You Were Waiting (For Me)" earned Franklin and Michael the 1987 Grammy Award for Best R&B Performance by a Duo or Group with Vocals. In 2018, Billboard magazine listed the song as Franklin's all-time biggest Hot 100 single.

== Background and recording ==
In 1984, Michael was approached to write and produce a song for Franklin for an unspecified soundtrack album; however, his busy schedule with Wham! made it impossible for him to do so at the time. Michael was also anxious that writing for one of his favourite artists could be too nerve-wracking (considering himself to be unworthy) and that for Franklin to sing a song he had written would be "ludicrous". According to Michael, he originally approached both Michael Jackson and Stevie Wonder respectively, before Franklin.

"I Knew You Were Waiting (For Me)" was recorded within two days at a recording studio in Detroit in May 1986, in-between the release of "A Different Corner" (Michael's second solo single) and Wham!'s farewell concert, which was held on 28 June that year. Michael's former agent and manager Rob Kahane recalled in Michael's autobiography Bare that Franklin was "belting out this song, just belting it out". According to Michael, he and Franklin recorded the song together, with ad-libs being recorded separately. He recalled "just freaking out" behind the microphone. "I'm on the other side of the mic from Aretha Franklin, and she's treating me like an equal—obviously I'm not, but she was treating me with such respect."

Following Michael's death in December 2016, Franklin recalled the following about the recording of "I Knew You Were Waiting (For Me)":

The first time I heard George was with Wham! and I liked it then. He had a very unique sound, very different from anything that was out there. When Clive [Davis], [Franklin's producer and label boss] suggested we get together for "I Knew You Were Waiting", I was all ready. It reminded me of [working with producer] Jerry Wexler. We'd go in the studio and cut songs. If we were happy with what we recorded, Jerry would say, "Let's wait until tomorrow. If we feel the same way [then] that we do now, maybe we have a hit." "I Knew You Were Waiting" had that. Musically, it does not grow old.

== Reception and chart performance ==
"I Knew You Were Waiting (For Me)" reached number one on both the Billboard Hot 100 and the UK Singles Chart, marking Franklin's first and only UK number-one hit.

In his book titled Dynamic Duets: The Best Pop Collaborations from 1955 to 1999, author Bob Leszczak described "I Knew You Were Waiting (For Me)" as a "joyous and uplifting duet".

== Music video ==
The official music video for the song was directed by Andy Morahan and filmed in Detroit. It begins with Michael and two bodyguards entering a dark room. There is a large viewing screen on the wall showing Franklin preparing for Michael. Over the course of the video, each of the singers is shown performing the song both in front of the screen and on it. During the second verse, footage from both Franklin's and Michael's earlier careers is shown on the screen. As the second chorus ends, Michael joins Franklin on the stage, and footage of earlier famous duet pairs—Marvin Gaye and Tammi Terrell, Sonny and Cher, Ike and Tina Turner, and others—are shown on the viewing screen while Michael and Franklin sing the song's bridge. At the end of the video, Franklin winks at the camera.

== Track listings ==
All tracks are written by Simon Climie and Dennis Morgan.

7″: Epic / DUET 2 (UK)
No.	Title	Length
1.	"I Knew You Were Waiting (For Me)"	4:02
2.	"I Knew You Were Waiting (For Me)" (instrumental)	4:02

7": Arista / AS1-9559 (US)
No.	Title	Length
1.	"I Knew You Were Waiting (For Me)"	3:52
2.	"I Knew You Were Waiting (For Me)" (Instrumental)	4:00

12″: Epic / DUET T2 (UK)
No.	Title	Length
1.	"I Knew You Were Waiting (For Me)" (extended remix)	7:30
2.	"I Knew You Were Waiting (For Me)" (percappella)	5:14
3.	"I Knew You Were Waiting (For Me)" (edited remix)	5:29

12": Arista / AD1-9560 (US)
No.	Title	Length
1.	"I Knew You Were Waiting (For Me)" (Edited Remix)	5:29
2.	"I Knew You Were Waiting (For Me)" (Percappella)	5:14
3.	"I Knew You Were Waiting (For Me)" (Album Version)	4:01
4.	"I Knew You Were Waiting (For Me)" (Extended Remix)	7:25

== Personnel ==
- Aretha Franklin – lead vocals
- George Michael – lead vocals
- Walter Afanasieff – synthesizers, Moog synth bass, programming
- Corrado Rustici – Charvel MIDI guitar synthesizer
- Randy Jackson – bass guitar
- Narada Michael Walden – drums
- Preston Glass – drum programming, percussion
- Gigi Gonaway – tambourine, percussion
- Jerry Hey – string arrangement
- Kitty Beethoven – backing vocals
- Kevin Dorsey – backing vocals
- Jim Gilstrap – backing vocals
- Jennifer Hall – backing vocals
- Myrna Matthews – backing vocals
- Claytoven Richardson – backing vocals
- Jeanie Tracy – backing vocals

== Charts ==
=== Weekly charts ===
Weekly chart performance for "I Knew You Were Waiting (For Me)"
Chart (1987)	Peak position
Australia (Kent Music Report)	1
Austria (Ö3 Austria Top 40)	9
Belgium (Ultratop 50 Flanders)	1
Canada Top Singles (RPM)	4
Canada Adult Contemporary (RPM)	2
Denmark (IFPI)	2
Europe (European Hot 100 Singles)	1
Finland (Suomen virallinen lista)	5
Ireland (IRMA)	1
Netherlands (Dutch Top 40)	1
Netherlands (Single Top 100)	1
New Zealand (Recorded Music NZ)	3
Norway (VG-lista)	4
Spain (AFYVE)	14
Sweden (Sverigetopplistan)	4
Switzerland (Schweizer Hitparade)	5
UK Singles (Official Charts)	1
US Billboard Hot 100	1
US Adult Contemporary (Billboard)	2
US Dance Club Songs (Billboard)	12
US Dance Singles Sales (Billboard)	33
US Hot R&B/Hip-Hop Songs (Billboard)	5
West Germany (GfK)	5
Zimbabwe (ZIMA)	1

=== Year-end charts ===
1987 year-end chart performance for "I Knew You Were Waiting (For Me)"
Chart (1987)	Position
Australia (Australian Music Report)	20
Belgium (Ultratop 50 Flanders)	12
Canada Top Singles (RPM)	35
Europe (European Hot 100 Singles)	30
Netherlands (Dutch Top 40)	8
Netherlands (Single Top 100)	8
New Zealand (RIANZ)	25
UK Singles (Gallup)	11
US Billboard Hot 100	36
US Adult Contemporary (Billboard)	38
US Cash Box Top 100	13
West Germany (Media Control)	52

== Certifications ==
Certifications and sales for "I Knew You Were Waiting (For Me)"
Region	Certification	Certified units/sales
Australia (ARIA)	Gold	35,000^{‡}
Netherlands (NVPI)	Gold	75,000^{^}
New Zealand (RMNZ)	Platinum	30,000^{‡}
United Kingdom (BPI)	Platinum	600,000^{‡}
^{^} Shipments figures based on certification alone.^{‡} Sales+streaming figures based on certification alone.
