= Jumpin' Jack Flash =

1968 single by the Rolling Stones

- US picture sleeve

Single by the Rolling Stones
- B-side: "Child of the Moon"
- Released: 24 May 1968 (UK); 31 May 1968 (US)
- Recorded: 20 April 1968
- Studio: Olympic, London
- Genre: Hard rock; blues rock
- Length: 3:42
- Label: Decca (UK); London (US)
- Songwriter: Jagger–Richards
- Producer: Jimmy Miller

Rolling Stones UK singles chronology
"We Love You" (1967)	"Jumpin' Jack Flash" (1968)	"Honky Tonk Women" (1969)

Rolling Stones US singles chronology
"She's a Rainbow" (1967)	"Jumpin' Jack Flash" (1968)	"Street Fighting Man" (1968)

Alternative release
- One of A-side labels of the original UK single

Music videos
- "Jumpin' Jack Flash" (With Makeup) on YouTube
- "Jumpin' Jack Flash" (No Makeup) on YouTube

"Jumpin' Jack Flash" is a song by the English rock band the Rolling Stones released as a non-album single in 1968, which reached the number 1 position in the UK singles chart and US Cash Box Top Singles. Called "supernatural Delta blues by way of Swinging London" by Rolling Stone magazine, the song was seen as the band's return to their blues rock roots after the baroque pop and psychedelia heard on their preceding albums Aftermath (1966), Between the Buttons (1967) and especially Their Satanic Majesties Request (1967).

"Jumpin' Jack Flash" was ranked number 144 on Rolling Stone's "The 500 Greatest Songs of All Time" list in 2021.

== Inspiration and recording ==
Written by Mick Jagger and Keith Richards, recording on "Jumpin' Jack Flash" began during the Beggars Banquet sessions of 1968. Regarding the song's distinctive sound, guitarist Richards has said:

I used a Gibson Hummingbird acoustic tuned to open D, six string. Open D or open E, which is the same thing – same intervals – but it would be slackened down some for D. Then there was a capo on it, to get that really tight sound. And there was another guitar over the top of that, but tuned to Nashville tuning. I learned that from somebody in George Jones' band in San Antonio in 1964. The high-strung guitar was an acoustic, too. Both acoustics were put through a Philips cassette recorder. Just jam the mic right in the guitar and play it back through an extension speaker.

Richards has stated that he and Jagger wrote the lyrics while staying at Richards' country house, when they were awoken one morning by the clumping footsteps of his gardener Jack Dyer walking past the window. Surprised, Jagger asked what it was, and Richards responded: "Oh, that's Jack – that's jumpin' Jack." The lyrics evolved from there. The main riff is similar to their song "(I Can't Get No) Satisfaction", as well the song "Mr. Soul" released the previous year by Buffalo Springfield.

Jagger said in a 1995 interview with Rolling Stone that the song arose "out of all the acid of Satanic Majesties. It's about having a hard time and getting out. Just a metaphor for getting out of all the acid things." And in a 1968 interview, Brian Jones described it as "getting back to ... the funky, essential essence" following the psychedelia of Their Satanic Majesties Request.

In his autobiography Stone Alone (1990), Bill Wyman has said that he came up with the song's distinctive main guitar riff, working on it with Brian Jones and Charlie Watts before it was ultimately credited to Jagger and Richards. In Rolling with the Stones (2002), Wyman credits Jagger with vocals, Richards with guitar and bass guitar, Jones with guitar, Watts with drums and himself with organ on the track with producer Jimmy Miller adding backing vocals.

According to the book Keith Richards: The Biography by Victor Bockris, the line "I was born in a crossfire hurricane", was written by Richards, and refers to his being born amid the bombing and air raid sirens of Dartford, England, in 1943 during World War II.

Two promotional videos were made that May: one of a live performance and another of the band lip syncing in makeup.

== Release and aftermath ==
Released on 24 May 1968 in the UK by Decca Records and on 31 May in the US by London Records, (Note: UK: DECCA F 12782; US: LONDON 908) "Jumpin' Jack Flash" (backed with "Child of the Moon") was the band's first UK release in five and a half months – this marked the group's longest gap between releases in the country up to that point. A major commercial success, it reached the top of the UK Singles Chart and peaked at number three in the United States. It topped the US Cashbox chart for one week and the WLS 890 Hit Parade for four weeks. Some early London Records US pressings and Decca single in the UK of the single had a technical flaw in them: at about 1:37 about halfway through the song's instrumental bridge, the speed of the master tape slows down for a moment, before coming back to speed. The first Rolling Stones album on which the song appeared was their 1969 compilation album, Through the Past, Darkly (Big Hits Vol. 2), one year after the single was released. Since then, it has appeared on numerous other Stones compilations, including Hot Rocks 1964–1971 (1971), Rolled Gold: The Very Best of the Rolling Stones (1975), Singles Collection: The London Years (1989), Forty Licks (2002), GRRR! (2012), and Stray Cats, a collection of singles and rarities included as part of The Rolling Stones in Mono box set (2016).

The Rolling Stones have played "Jumpin' Jack Flash" during every tour since its release. It is the song the band has played in concert most frequently, and has appeared on the concert albums Get Yer Ya-Ya's Out! (recorded 1969, released 1970), Love You Live (recorded 1976, released 1977), Flashpoint (recorded 1990, released 1991), Shine a Light (recorded 2006, released 2008), Hyde Park Live (2013), Totally Stripped (recorded 1995, released 2016), and Havana Moon (2016), as well as, notably, The Rolling Stones Rock and Roll Circus (recorded 1968, released 1996), featuring the only released live performance of the song with Brian Jones. Unlike most of that show, Jones is heard clearly, mixing with Richards's lead throughout the song. The intro is not usually played in concert and instead the song begins with the main riff. The open E or open D tuning of the rhythm guitar on the studio recording has also not been replicated in concert (with the possible exception of the 1968 NME awards show, no recording of which has ever surfaced). In the performance filmed for The Rolling Stones Rock and Roll Circus in December 1968, Richards used standard tuning; and ever since the band's appearance at Hyde Park on 5 July 1969, he has played it in open G tuning with a capo on the fourth fret. Richards is particularly fond of the song's main riff, often crediting it as his favorite among all of his most revered guitar riffs.

In March 2005, Q magazine placed "Jumpin' Jack Flash" at number 2 in its list of the 100 Greatest Guitar Tracks. VH1 placed it at number 65 in its show 100 Greatest Rock Songs.

It has placed at 144 on Rolling Stone's list of "The 500 Greatest Songs of All Time", and 7th on their list of the band's best songs.

A cover version of the song, performed by Billy Fogarty, was composed to serve as the final mission of the Nintendo DS rhythm game Elite Beat Agents, in which the titular protagonists use their dancing skills to rally humanity against alien invaders who plan to outlaw all forms of music.

== Personnel ==
The Rolling Stones

- Mick Jagger – lead vocals, backing vocals
- Keith Richards – backing vocals, acoustic guitar, bass, bass tom, lead guitar
- Brian Jones – rhythm guitar
- Bill Wyman – organ (Note: Margotin and Guesdon suggest another Wyman keyboard contribution can be heard from 2:51 on, but are uncertain whether it is a Mellotron or Hammond organ.)
- Charlie Watts – drums

Additional musicians

- Ian Stewart – piano
- Jimmy Miller – backing vocals
- Rocky Dijon – maracas

== Charts and certifications ==
=== Weekly charts ===
Chart (1968–1969)	Peak position
Australia (Go Set)	1
Austria (Ö3 Austria Top 40)	3
Belgium (Ultratop 50 Flanders)	8
Canada Top Singles (RPM)	5
Finland (Soumen Virallinen)	22
Germany (GfK)	1
Ireland (IRMA)	3
Italy (Musica e dischi)	16
Netherlands (Single Top 100)	1
New Zealand (Listener)	1
Norway (VG-lista)	3
Rhodesia (Lyons Maid)	11
South Africa (Springbok)	8
Spanish Singles Chart	5
Sweden (Kvällstoppen)	8
Sweden (Tio i Topp)	14
Switzerland (Schweizer Hitparade)	2
UK Singles (Official Charts)	1
UK Melody Maker	1
UK NME	1
US Billboard Hot 100	3
US Cash Box Top 100	1
US Record World Singles	2
Yugoslavia (Džuboks)	3

=== Year-end charts ===
Chart (1968)	Rank
Canada	36
US Billboard Hot 100	50
US Cash Box Top 100	26
US Dave Marsh's Book of Rock Lists	1

=== Certifications ===
Region	Certification	Certified units/sales
Australia (ARIA)	Platinum	70,000^{‡}
New Zealand (RMNZ)	Gold	15,000^{‡}
United Kingdom (BPI)	Silver	250,000^{‡}
^{‡} Sales+streaming figures based on certification alone.

== Aretha Franklin version ==
"Jumpin' Jack Flash"
- Cover art, featuring Richards on the right

Single by Aretha Franklin

from the album Aretha
- B-side: "Integrity"
- Released: 9 September 1986 (US)
- Recorded: 1985
- Genre: Rock; R&B; soul
- Length: 4:26
- Label: Arista
- Songwriter: Jagger/Richards
- Producer: Keith Richards

Aretha Franklin singles chronology
"Ain't Nobody Ever Loved You" (1986)	"Jumpin' Jack Flash" (1986)	"Jimmy Lee" (1986)

In 1986, the song's title was used in the end credits for the Whoopi Goldberg film Jumpin' Jack Flash. In addition to the Rolling Stones' version of the song, the film features Aretha Franklin's cover version in which Ronnie Wood and Richards play guitar, and Franklin plays piano. This version is characterised by influences from the popular black music scene. Only the Rolling Stones' version is on the film's original soundtrack recording.

=== Personnel ===
- Aretha Franklin – lead vocals, acoustic piano
- Steve Jordan – drums
- Alan Rogan – guitar
- Ortheia Barnes – backing vocals
- Margaret Branch – backing vocals
- Brenda Corbett – backing vocals
- Keith Richards – lead guitar
- Ronnie Wood – guitar
- Randy Jackson – bass guitar
- Chuck Leavell – keyboards
- Steve Lillywhite – engineer
- Michael Frondelli – mixing engineer

=== Charts ===
Chart (1986–87)	Peak position
German Singles Chart	42
Swiss Singles Chart	19
Dutch Top 40	48
Swedish Singles Chart	14
New Zealand Singles Chart	43
UK Singles Chart	58
US Billboard Hot 100	21
US Billboard Hot Black Singles	20
US Billboard Mainstream Rock Airplay	36

== Other versions ==
- Thelma Houston covered the song for her 1969 debut album Sunshower.

== Bibliography ==
- Aeppli, Felix (1985). Heart of Stone: The Definitive Rolling Stones Discography, 1962-1983. Ann Arbor, Michigan: Pierian Press. ISBN 0876501927.
- Babiuk, Andy; Prevost, Greg (2013). Rolling Stones Gear: All the Stones Instruments from Stage to Studio. Milwaukee: Backbeat Books. ISBN 9781617130922.
- Brackett, David (2008). The Pop, Rock, and Soul Reader: Histories and Debates. Oxford University Press. ISBN 9780195365931.
- Egan, Sean (2013). The Mammoth Book of The Rolling Stones. London: Constable & Robinson Ltd. ISBN 9781780336466.
- Margotin, Philippe; Guesdon, Jean-Michel (2016). The Rolling Stones All the Songs: The Story Behind Every Track. New York: Black Dog & Leventhal Publishers. ISBN 9780316317740.
- Milward, John (2013). Crossroads: How the Blues Shaped Rock 'n' Roll (and Rock Saved the Blues). Northeastern. ISBN 9781555537449.
- Rice, Jo (1982). The Guinness Book of 500 Number One Hits (1st ed.). Enfield, Middlesex: Guinness Superlatives Ltd. ISBN 0851122507.
