= What You See Is What You Sweat =

1991 studio album by Aretha Franklin

Studio album by Aretha Franklin
- Released: July 2, 1991
- Studio: Various: Tarpan Studios (San Rafael, CA); Sound Suite Recording Studios (Detroit, MI); Conway Recording Studios (Los Angeles, CA); Westlake Recording Studios (Los Angeles, CA); Lighthouse Studios (Los Angeles, CA); Phase II Studios (Los Angeles, CA); Chartmaker Studios (Malibu, CA); Willyworld Studios (Los Angeles, CA); The Lab Recording Studio (West Orange, NJ); Sigma Sound Studios (New York, NY); Zeezicht Studios (Holland, Netherlands); Chameleon Recording Studios (West Orange, NJ); Microplant Studios (Los Angeles, CA); Guillaume Tell Studios (Paris, France); Right Track Recording (New York, NY); The Hit Factory (New York, NY); A&M Studios (Los Angeles, CA); The Village Recorder (Los Angeles, CA)
- Genres: New jack swing; house
- Length: 44:23
- Label: Arista
- Producers: Burt Bacharach; Carole Bayer Sager; David "Pic" Conley; Aretha Franklin; Michel Legrand; Oliver Leiber; Gene Lennon; Bruce Roberts; Joshua Paul Thompson; David Townsend; Luther Vandross; Narada Michael Walden; Elliot Wolff

Aretha Franklin chronology
Through the Storm (1989)	What You See Is What You Sweat (1991)	Queen of Soul: The Atlantic Recordings (1992)

Singles from What You See Is What You Sweat
- 1. "Everyday People" Released: June 1991; 2. "Someone Else's Eyes" Released: September 1991; 3. "What You See Is What You Sweat" Released: 1991; 4. "Ever Changing Times" Released: January 1992

What You See Is What You Sweat is the thirty-third studio album by American singer Aretha Franklin, released on July 2, 1991, by Arista Records.

The album received mixed reviews, with some praising Franklin's vocal performance while others criticized the album's production and song quality. It peaked at number 153 on US Billboard 200, dropping off after seven weeks. This was Franklin's first new release in the Nielsen SoundScan era.

== Critical reception ==
Professional ratings
Review scores
Source	Rating
AllMusic	3/5 stars
Calgary Herald	C−
Robert Christgau	(dud)
Entertainment Weekly	C+
NME	4/10
Rolling Stone	3/5 stars

Rolling Stone editor Stephen Holden found that "although the material runs a gamut of styles, Franklin infuses her personality so indelibly into every song that somehow it all holds together." Rating the album three out of five stars, he concluded: "Because Franklin brings more spirit than usual to the record, What You See Is What You Sweat stands as one of her better albums. If the songs are uneven, they don't prevent the Queen of Soul from exuberantly expressing the breadth of her musical personality, from regal pop-gospel diva to funky everyday person." AllMusic also gave the album three out of five stars. People Magazine gave a mixed review.

New York Times critic Jon Pareles found that What You See Is What You Sweat was as "awkward as its title. Like Ms. Franklin's recent albums, it tacks a 1960's oldie [...] onto a group of new pop songs [though] they seem [like] the rejects from other projects." Parles further remarked: "The frustrating thing is that Franklin can still sing like no one else; her voice swoops, curves, coos, growls, caresses. Amid the trendy and pretentious trappings, it's a beacon of emotion. Trying to keep up with the latest pop only holds her back." NME David Quantick felt that "only Vandross seems to have noticed the 1990s, and several tracks are burdened with lame mid-'80s "funky" production clutter and clatter. This record is mostly a dull mess."

== Commercial performance ==
The album opened at number 167 on the US Billboard 200 and peaked at number 153 the following week. It marked Franklin's lowest-charting album on the Arista label. At the time of its deletion, this album had sold 179,000 units, domestically.

== Track listing ==
What You See Is What You Sweat track listing
No.	Title	Writer(s)	Producer(s)	Length
1.	"Everyday People"	Sly Stone	Narada Michael Walden	3:50
2.	"Ever Changing Times" (duet with Michael McDonald)	Burt Bacharach; Bill Conti; Carole Bayer Sager	Bacharach; Bayer Sager	4:54
3.	"What You See Is What You Sweat"	David Conley; Derrick Culler; Gene Lennon; Joshua Thompson	Conley; David Townsend	4:24
4.	"Mary Goes Round"	Elliot Wolff; Oliver Leiber	Wolff; Leiber	3:06
5.	"I Dreamed a Dream"	Alain Boublil; Herbert Kretzmer; Jean Marc Natel; Claude-Michel Schonberg	Conley	4:17
6.	"Someone Else's Eyes"	Bruce Roberts; Bacharach; Bayer Sager	Roberts; Bacharach; Bayer Sager	4:57
7.	"Doctor's Orders" (duet with Luther Vandross)	Vandross; Hubert Eaves III	Vandross	4:35
8.	"You Can't Take Me for Granted"	Aretha Franklin	Franklin	5:12
9.	"What Did You Give"	Franklin	Michel Legrand	5:01
10.	"Everyday People" (Shep Pettibone Remix)	Stone	Walden; Pettibone	4:07
Total length:				44:23

== Personnel ==
Musicians

- Aretha Franklin – vocals, acoustic piano (5)
- Louis Biancaniello – keyboards (1), programming (1)
- Burt Bacharach – keyboards (2, 6)
- Michael Boddicker – keyboards (2, 6), programming (2, 6)
- David Foster – keyboards (2)
- Larry Williams – programming (2)
- Joshua Thompson – keyboard synthesizer (3), drum programming (3), guitars (6)
- Bobby Wooten – keyboard synthesizer (3, 5), string arrangements and conductor (3), string synthesizer (5), bass (5), drum programming (5), rhythm arrangements (5), electric piano (6)
- Peter Schwartz – additional keyboards (3, 10)
- Gene Lennon – computer programming (3)
- Oliver Leiber – keyboard programming (4), drum programming (4), guitars (4)
- Elliot Wolff – keyboard programming (4), drum programming (4)
- Rudolph Stansfield – acoustic piano (6, 8)
- Randy Waldman – keyboards (6)
- Nat Adderley Jr. – keyboards (7)
- Skip Anderson – keyboards (7)
- Hubert Eaves III – keyboards (7), drum programming (7)
- Jason Miles – keyboards (7)
- Charles Scales – synthesizers (8)
- Thierry Eliez – acoustic piano (9)
- Michel Legrand – synthesizers (9), arrangements and conductor (9)
- Vernon "Ice" Black – guitars (1)
- Dean Parks – guitars (2, 6)
- David Townsend – guitars (3)
- Rick Iantosca – acoustic guitar (5), lead guitar (5)
- Paul Jackson Jr. – guitars (7)
- Teddy F. White – guitars (8)
- Jean-Marc Benais – guitars (9)
- David "Pic" Conley – synth bass (3)
- Marcus Miller – bass guitar (6), bass (7)
- Al Turner – bass (8)
- Dominique Bertram – electric bass (9)
- Narada Michael Walden – drums (1), programming (1), arrangements (1)
- Guy Vaughn – drum programming (6)
- Buster Marbury – drums (8)
- André Ceccarelli – drums (9)
- Paulinho da Costa – percussion (7)
- Larry Fratangelo – percussion (8)
- Marc Chantereau – percussion (9)
- Candy Dulfer – saxophone (4)
- David Boruff – saxophone (6)
- Onita Sanders – harp (8)
- Franck Thore – pan flute (9)
- Francis Darizcuren – string leader (9)

Background and guest vocalists

- Jarvis Barker – backing vocals (1)
- Nikita Germaine – backing vocals (1)
- Skyler Jett – backing vocals (1)
- Jeanie Tracy – backing vocals (1)
- Tony Lindsay – backing vocals (1)
- Michael McDonald – vocals (2)
- Aretha Franklin – backing vocals (3)
- Gwen Guthrie – backing vocals (3)
- Margaret Branch – backing vocals (6, 8)
- Brenda Corbett – backing vocals (6)
- Lynn Davis – backing vocals (6)
- Sandra Feva – backing vocals (6)
- Portia Griffin – backing vocals (6)
- Jesse Richardson – backing vocals (6)
- Luther Vandross – vocals (7)
- Tawatha Agee – backing vocals (7)
- Cindy Mizelle – backing vocals (7)
- Fonzi Thornton – backing vocals (7)
- Donna Davis – backing vocals (8)
- Sherry Fox – backing vocals (8)
- Diane Green – backing vocals (8)
- Marj Haber – backing vocals (8)
- Esther Ridgeway – backing vocals (8)
- Gloria Ridgeway – backing vocals (8)
- Gracie Ridgeway – backing vocals (8)

== Production ==
- Clive Davis – executive producer
- Derrick Culler – co-producer (3)
- Gene Lennon – co-producer (3)
- Joshua Thompson – co-producer (3)
- Michael Hutchinson – additional production (3)
- Aretha Franklin – co-producer (5)
- Bobby Wooten – co-producer (5)
- David "Pic" Conley – associate producer (6)
- Janice Lee – production coordinator (1)
- Kelly McRae – production coordinator (1)
- Cynthia Shiloh – production coordinator (1)
- Kevin Walden – production coordinator (1)
- Marsha Burns – production coordinator (7)
- Maurice Cevrero – music preparation (9)
- Maude Gilman – art direction, design
- Max Vadukul – photography
- Reggie Wells – make-up
- Eleanor Stokes – hair
- Alexander White – stylist

Technical credits

- David Frazer – recording (1), mixing (1)
- Humberto Gatica – mixing (2)
- Kevin Becka – engineer (2, 6)
- Mick Guzauski – engineer (2, 6), mixing (6)
- Erik Hanson – engineer (2)
- Don Mack – engineer (2)
- Jess Sutcliffe – engineer (2, 6)
- Joey Wolpert – engineer (2)
- Jeffrey "Woody" Woodruff – engineer (2, 6)
- Michael Hutchinson – mixing (3, 5)
- David "Pic" Conley – basic track recording (3)
- Bob Brockmann – string recording (3)
- Mike Iacopelli – vocal recording (3–5), recording (8), mixing (8, 9)
- Alan Meyerson – mixing (4)
- Elliott Wolff – engineer (4)
- Frans Hendrix – saxophone recording (4)
- Ray Bardani – engineer (7), mixing (7)
- Paul Brown – engineer (7)
- Roland Guillotel – sound engineer (9)
- Shep Pettibone – mixing (10), post-production (10)
- Curt Frasca – mix engineer (10)
- Steve Capp – additional recording (1), assistant engineer (8)
- Marc Reyburn – additional recording (1), assistant engineer (1)
- Greg McConnell – assistant engineer (4)
- Tony Shimkin – editing (10)

== Charts ==
Weekly chart performance for What You See Is What You Sweat
Chart (1991)	Peak position
Austrian Albums (Ö3 Austria)	34
European Albums (Music & Media)	73
Norwegian Albums (VG-lista)	14
Swedish Albums (Sverigetopplistan)	19
Swiss Albums (Schweizer Hitparade)	26
US Billboard 200	153
US Top R&B/Hip-Hop Albums (Billboard)	28
