= List of awards and nominations received by Audra McDonald =

Audra McDonald awards and nominations
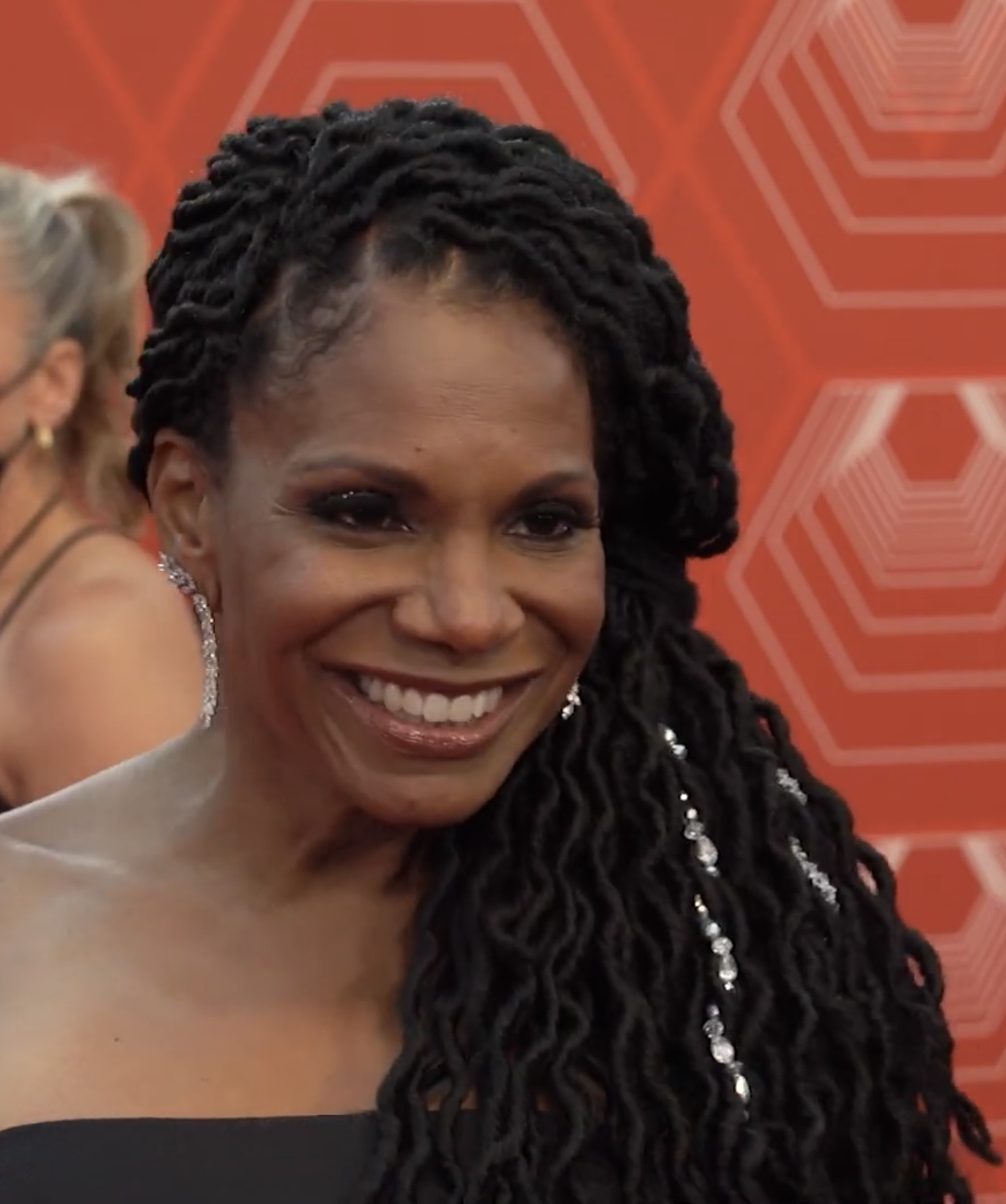
- McDonald at the 74th Tony Awards in 2021
Awards and nominations
Award	Wins	Nominations
Critics' Choice Television Awards	0	2
Drama Desk Award	5	6
Grammy Awards	2	4
NAACP Image Award	0	7
Primetime Emmy Awards	1	5
Screen Actors Guild Awards	0	2
Tony Awards	6	11

Totals (Note: Certain award groups do not simply award one winner. They acknowledge several different recipients, have runners-up, and have third place. Since this is a specific recognition and is different from losing an award, runner-up mentions are considered wins in this award tally. For simplification and to avoid errors, each award in this list has been presumed to have had a prior nomination.)
- Wins: 26
- Nominations: 54

Audra McDonald is an American actress and singer who over her career has received six Tony Awards, two Grammy Awards and a Primetime Emmy Award in addition to two Screen Actors Guild Awards nominations. She has remained active in stage productions and musicals since the 1990s, and has garnered widespread acclaim and critical support for her performances, being honoured with numerous awards, including the Golden Plate Award of the American Academy of Achievement (2012) and induction into the American Theater Hall of Fame (2017). She is the most nominated performer in Tony Award history, with eleven nominations.

McDonald has performed in musicals, operas, and stage dramas such as A Moon for the Misbegotten, 110 in the Shade, Dreamgirls, Carousel, Ragtime, Master Class, Porgy and Bess, Lady Day at Emerson's Bar and Grill, becoming the most awarded actress of the Tony Awards with six awards, becoming the only person to win all four acting categories. (Note: Best Actress in a Play, Best Actress in a Musical, Best Featured Actress in a Play, and Best Featured Actress in a Musical.) She was also recipient of the Sarah Siddons Distinguished Achievement in the Theatre Award, six Drama Desk Award and five Outer Critics Circle Award. She was nominated for four Grammy Awards, winning two times for Best Classical Album and Best Opera Recording for Rise and Fall of the City of Mahagonny Soundtrack.

McDonald starred in televisions series and motion pictures, including Wit (2001), which gave her her first Primetime Emmy Awards nomination for Outstanding Supporting Actress in a Miniseries or a Movie. She acted in A Raisin in the Sun, earning nominations at the Primetime Emmy Awards and NAACP Image Awards, and as Dr. Naomi Bennett in television series Private Practice, being nominated three times for Outstanding Actress in a Drama Series at the NAACP Image Awards. Since 2012, McDonald has served as host for the PBS series Live from Lincoln Center, for which she won a Primetime Emmy Award for Outstanding Special Class Program with the show's producers for Sweeney Todd, aired in 2015.

In 2016 McDonald starred as Billie Holiday in filmed stage production Lady Day at Emerson's Bar and Grill, receiving price from the critics, earning nominations at the Primetime Emmy Award for Outstanding Lead Actress in a Limited or Anthology Series or Movie and an at the Screen Actors Guild Award for Outstanding Performance by a Female Actor in a Television Movie or Limited Series. Since 2017, McDonald joined the cast of The Good Fight, being nominated two times for at the Critics' Choice Television Award for Best Supporting Actress in a Drama Series. In 2021 she starred as Barbara Siggers Franklin in Aretha Franklin's biographical musical drama film Respect, earning a nomination at the NAACP Image Award for Outstanding Supporting Actress in a Motion Picture.

== Major Association ==
=== Emmy Awards ===
Year	Category	Nominated work	Result	Ref.
Primetime Emmy Awards
2001	Outstanding Supporting Actress in a Miniseries or a Movie	Wit	Nominated	
2008	Outstanding Supporting Actress in a Miniseries or a Movie	A Raisin in the Sun	Nominated	
2013	Outstanding Special Class Program	Carousel (Live from Lincoln Center)	Nominated	
2015	Outstanding Special Class Program	Sweeney Todd (Live from Lincoln Center)	Won	
2016	Outstanding Lead Actress in a Limited Series or Movie	Lady Day at Emerson's Bar and Grill	Nominated	

=== Grammy Awards ===
Year	Category	Nominated work	Result	Ref.
2009	Best Classical Album	Rise and Fall of the City of Mahagonny	Won	
2009	Best Opera Recording	Rise and Fall of the City of Mahagonny	Won	
2013	Best Musical Theater Album	Porgy and Bess	Nominated	
2026	Best Musical Theater Album	Gypsy	Nominated	

=== Screen Actors Guild Awards ===
Year	Category	Nominated work	Result	Ref.
2016	Outstanding Actress in a Limited Series or Television Movie	Lady Day at Emerson's Bar and Grill	Nominated	
2023	Outstanding Ensemble in a Drama Series	The Gilded Age	Nominated	

=== Tony Awards ===
Year	Category	Nominated work	Result	Ref.
1994	Best Featured Actress in a Musical	Carousel	Won	
1996	Best Featured Actress in a Play	Master Class	Won	
1998	Best Featured Actress in a Musical	Ragtime	Won	
2000	Best Actress in a Musical	Marie Christine	Nominated	
2004	Best Featured Actress in a Play	A Raisin in the Sun	Won	
2007	Best Actress in a Musical	110 in the Shade	Nominated	
2012	Best Actress in a Musical	Porgy and Bess	Won	
2014	Best Actress in a Play	Lady Day at Emerson's Bar and Grill	Won	
2020	Best Actress in a Play	Frankie and Johnny in the Clair de Lune	Nominated	
2023	Best Actress in a Play	Ohio State Murders	Nominated	
2025	Best Actress in a Musical	Gypsy	Nominated	

== Theater associations ==
Award	Year	Category	Nominated work	Result	Ref.
Antonyo Awards	2020	Best Actor in a Play on Broadway	Frankie and Johnny in the Clair de Lune	Won	
Broadway.com Audience Awards	2004	Favorite Featured Actress in a Play	A Raisin in the Sun	Won	
Broadway.com Audience Awards	2007	Favorite Actress in a Musical	110 in the Shade	Nominated	
Broadway.com Audience Awards	2012	Favorite Actress in a Musical	Porgy and Bess	Nominated	
Broadway.com Audience Awards	2012	Favorite Onstage Pair (with Norm Lewis)	Porgy and Bess	Nominated	
Broadway.com Audience Awards	2014	Favorite Actress in a Play	Lady Day at Emerson's Bar and Grill	Won	
Broadway.com Audience Awards	2014	Favorite Diva Performance	Lady Day at Emerson's Bar and Grill	Nominated	
Broadway.com Audience Awards	2016	Favorite Diva Performance	Shuffle Along, or [...]	Nominated	
Broadway.com Audience Awards	2024	Favorite Leading Actress in a Musical	Gypsy	Nominated	
Broadway.com Audience Awards	2024	Favorite Diva Performance	Gypsy	Nominated	
Broadway.com Audience Awards	2024	Favorite Onstage Pair (with Danny Burstein)	Gypsy	Nominated	
Broadway.com Audience Awards	2024	Performance of the Year (Musical)	Gypsy	Nominated	
Drama Desk Awards	1994	Outstanding Featured Actress in a Musical	Carousel	Won	
Drama Desk Awards	2000	Outstanding Actress in a Musical	Marie Christine	Nominated	
Drama Desk Awards	2004	Outstanding Featured Actress in a Play	A Raisin in the Sun	Won	
Drama Desk Awards	2007	Outstanding Actress in a Musical	110 in the Shade	Won	
Drama Desk Awards	2012	Outstanding Actress in a Musical	Porgy and Bess	Won	
Drama Desk Awards	2014	Outstanding Actress in a Play	Lady Day at Emerson's Bar and Grill	Won	
Drama Desk Awards	2023	Outstanding Lead Performance in a Play	Ohio State Murders	Nominated	
Drama Desk Awards	2025	Outstanding Lead Performance in a Musical	Gypsy	Won	
Drama League Award	1998	Distinguished Performance	Ragtime	Nominated	
Drama League Award	2005	Distinguished Performance	A Raisin in the Sun	Nominated	
Drama League Award	2007	Distinguished Performance	110 in the Shade	Nominated	
Drama League Award	2012	Distinguished Performance	Porgy and Bess	Won	
Laurence Olivier Award	2018	Best Actress	Lady Day at Emerson's Bar and Grill	Nominated	
Outer Critics Circle Award	1994	Outstanding Actress in a Musical	Carousel	Won	
Outer Critics Circle Award	1998	Outstanding Featured Actress in a Musical	Ragtime	Nominated	
Outer Critics Circle Award	2004	Outstanding Featured Actress in a Play	A Raisin in the Sun	Won	
Outer Critics Circle Award	2007	Outstanding Actress in a Musical	110 in the Shade	Won	
Outer Critics Circle Award	2012	Outstanding Actress in a Musical	Porgy and Bess	Won	
Outer Critics Circle Award	2014	Outstanding Actress in a Musical	Lady Day at Emerson's Bar and Grill	Won	
Outer Critics Circle Award	2022	Outstanding Lead Performer in a Broadway Play	Ohio State Murders	Nominated	
Outer Critics Circle Award	2025	Outstanding Lead Performer in a Broadway Musical	Gypsy	Nominated	
Ovation Awards	1996	Best Featured Actress in a Play	Master Class	Won	
Sarah Siddons Award	2013	Distinguished Achievement in the Theatre	Herself	Won	
Theatre World Award	1994	Honoree Award	Herself	Won	

== Miscellaneous awards ==
Award	Year	Category	Nominated work	Result	Ref.
Black Reel Awards	2013	Best Supporting Actress in a Movie	The Sound of Music Live!	Nominated	
Black Reel Awards	2017	Best Actress, TV Movie or Limited Series	Lady Day at Emerson's Bar and Grill	Nominated	
Critics' Choice Television Awards	2020	Best Supporting Actress in a Drama Series	The Good Fight	Nominated	
Critics' Choice Television Awards	2022	Best Supporting Actress in a Drama Series	The Good Fight	Nominated	
Critics' Choice Television Awards	2023	Best Supporting Actress in a Drama Series	The Good Fight	Nominated	
NAACP Image Award	2001	Outstanding Variety – Series or Special	Audra McDonald in Concert	Nominated	
NAACP Image Award	2008	Best Actress in a Television Movie or Miniseries	A Raisin in the Sun	Nominated	
NAACP Image Award	2008	Outstanding Actress in a Drama Series	Private Practice	Nominated	
NAACP Image Award	2009	Outstanding Actress in a Drama Series	Private Practice	Nominated	
NAACP Image Award	2010	Outstanding Actress in a Drama Series	Private Practice	Nominated	
NAACP Image Award	2018	Outstanding Supporting Actress in a Motion Picture	Beauty and the Beast	Nominated	
NAACP Image Award	2022	Outstanding Supporting Actress in a Motion Picture	Respect	Nominated	
Satellite Awards	2017	Best Actress – Miniseries or TV Film	Lady Day at Emerson's Bar and Grill	Nominated	
Online Film and Television Association	2001	Best Supporting Actress in a TV film	Wit	Nominated	
Online Film and Television Association	2008	Best Supporting Actress in a TV film	A Raisin in the Sun	Won	
