= One Lord, One Faith, One Baptism =

1987 live album by Aretha Franklin

Live album by Aretha Franklin
- Released: December 1987
- Recorded: July 27–28, 30, 1987
- Venues: New Bethel Baptist Church (Detroit, Michigan)
- Genres: Gospel, soul
- Length: 1:58:54
- Label: Arista
- Producer: Aretha Franklin

Aretha Franklin chronology
Aretha (1986)	One Lord, One Faith, One Baptism (1987)	Through the Storm (1989)

Professional ratings
Review scores
Source	Rating
AllMusic	3/5 stars
Melody Maker	(mixed)
New Musical Express	7/10
Robert Christgau	B+
Rolling Stone	4/5 stars

One Lord, One Faith, One Baptism is a 1987 gospel album recorded by Aretha Franklin, for Arista Records. Recorded at New Bethel Baptist Church in Detroit, Michigan, over the course of three nights (July 27, 28, and 30, 1987), One Lord, One Faith, One Baptism became an album that combined the gospel talents of Aretha, her sisters Erma and Carolyn, and fellow gospel singer Mavis Staples.

However, this release had modest sales, peaking at #106 on Billboard's album chart, and paled in comparison to Aretha's legendary classic Amazing Grace recording.

The original release was a double vinyl LP issued by Arista Records in December, 1987. An abridged single CD was also issued removing two tracks (the speech by Rev. Jesse Jackson that opens Side 3 of the vinyl edition, and the Prayer Invocation by Rev. Donald Parsons that appeared on Side 4 of the vinyl edition). In 2003, the double vinyl version was reissued as a two-CD set by ARISTA BMG Heritage – this version was remastered and expanded by adding four previously unissued bonus tracks to the end of the second disc. The edited structure of the original double vinyl edition is retained to preserve the original album experience.

== Track listing ==
Vocalists on tracks are identified by superscripts: (a) Aretha Franklin, (b) Mavis Staples, (c) Reverend Cecil Franklin, (d) Reverend Jesse Jackson, (e) Reverend Jaspar Williams, (f) Erma Franklin, (g) Carolyn Franklin, (h) Joe Ligon of The Mighty Clouds of Joy

=== Original Vinyl Double Album (1987) ===
Side one

1. "Walk In The Light (Traditional) - 4:00 ^{a}
2. "Prayer Invocation by Rev. Cecil Franklin - 5:44 ^{c}
3. "Introduction of Aretha and the Franklin Sisters by Rev. Jesse Jackson - :37 ^{a d} ^{f g}
4. "Jesus Hears Every Prayer (Clara Ward) - 5:16 ^{a d} ^{f g}
5. "Surely God Is Able (Clara Ward) - 6:01 ^{a d} ^{f g}

Side two

1. "The Lord's Prayer (Traditional) - 5:05 ^{a}
2. "Introduction of Aretha and Mavis Staples by Rev. Jesse Jackson - 3:22 ^{a b d}
3. "Oh Happy Day (Edwin Hawkins) - 6:09 ^{a b}
4. "We Need Power (Traditional) - 6:30 ^{a b}

Side three

1. "Speech by Rev. Jesse Jackson [July 27th] - 9:57 ^{d}
2. "Ave Maria (Traditional) - 6:48 ^{a}
3. "Introduction To Higher Ground by Rev. Jaspar Williams - 4:10 ^{e}
4. "Higher Ground" (Traditional) - 1:07 ^{a e}

Side four

1. "Higher Ground (continued) - 2:04 ^{a e}
2. "Prayer Invocation by Rev. Donald Parsons [July 28] - 7:29
3. "I've Been In The Storm Too Long (Traditional) - 7:55 ^{a h}
4. "Packing Up, Getting Ready To Go (Clara Ward) - 5:34 ^{a b} ^{f g h}

=== Remastered Expanded Double CD (2003) ===
Disc one

1. "Walk In The Light (Traditional) - 4:00 ^{a}
2. "Prayer Invocation by Rev. Cecil Franklin - 5:49 ^{c}
3. "Introduction of Aretha and the Franklin Sisters by Rev. Jesse Jackson - 0:48 ^{a d} ^{f g}
4. "Jesus Hears Every Prayer (Clara Ward) - 7:20 ^{a d} ^{f g}
5. "Surely God Is Able (Clara Ward) - 4:44 ^{a d} ^{f g}
6. "The Lord's Prayer (Traditional) - 5:06 ^{a}
7. "Introduction of Aretha and Mavis Staples by Rev. Jesse Jackson - 3:22 ^{a b d}
8. "Oh Happy Day (Edwin Hawkins) - 6:10 ^{a b}
9. "We Need Power (Traditional) - 6:32 ^{a b}
10. "Speech by Rev. Jesse Jackson [July 27th] - 9:58 ^{d}

Disc two

1. "Ave Maria (Traditional) - 6:51 ^{a}
2. "Introduction To Higher Ground by Rev. Jaspar Williams - 4:09 ^{e}
3. "Higher Ground (Traditional) - 3:56 ^{a e}
4. "Prayer Invocation by Rev. Donald Parsons [July 28] - 7:31
5. "I've Been In The Storm Too Long (Traditional) - 8:10 ^{a h}
6. "Packing Up, Getting Ready To Go (Clara Ward) - 5:35 ^{a b} ^{f g h}
7. "Be Grateful (Walter Hawkins) [Bonus Track - Previously Unreleased] - 9:22 ^{a b}
8. "Beams Of Heaven (Some Day) (Charles A. Tindley) [Bonus Track - Previously Unreleased] - 7:21 ^{a}
9. "Father, I Stretch My Hands To Thee (Charles Wesley, CM Hugh Wilson) [Bonus Track - Previously Unreleased] - 7:04 ^{a b}
10. "Packing Up, Getting Ready To Go [Bonus Track - Previously Unreleased Alternate Version] (Clara Ward) - 5:17 ^{a b} ^{f g h}

== Personnel ==
- Aretha Franklin - Vocals, piano
- Mavis Staples - Vocals
- Brenda Corbett - Vocals
- Brian Leskowicz - Engineer
- Carolyn Franklin - Vocals
- Dana Davis - Percussion
- David Hewitt - Engineer
- Earl Wright Jr. - Organ
- Erma Franklin - Vocals
- Frank Fischer - House Mix
- Fritz Lange - Engineer
- Joe Ligon - Arranger
- Reverend Jesse Jackson - Speaker
- Reverend Cecil Franklin - Speaker
- John Hudson - Product Manager
- Lanar Brantley - Bass
- Margaret Branch - Background Vocals
- Mark Wilder - Mastering
- Maude Gilman - Design
- Michael Iacopelli - Mixing
- Michael Wright - Guitar
- Nedra Olds-Neal - Reissue Producer
- Nick Johnson - Piano
- Ortheia Barnes - Background Vocals
- Phil Gitomer - Engineer
- Renee Thomas - Background Vocals
- Sandra Feva - Background Vocals
- Thomas Whitfield - Organ, Piano, Arranger, Vocal Arrangement

== Chart history ==
Chart (1988)	Peak position
US Billboard 200	106
US Top Gospel Albums (Billboard)	1
US Top R&B/Hip-Hop Albums (Billboard)	25

Chart (1989)	Peak position
US Top Christian Albums (Billboard)	34
