= Siggers =

Siggers is a surname. Notable people with the surname include:

- Barbara Siggers Franklin (1917–1952), American singer
- Jason Siggers (born 1985), American basketball player
