= Audra McDonald =

American actress and singer (born 1970)

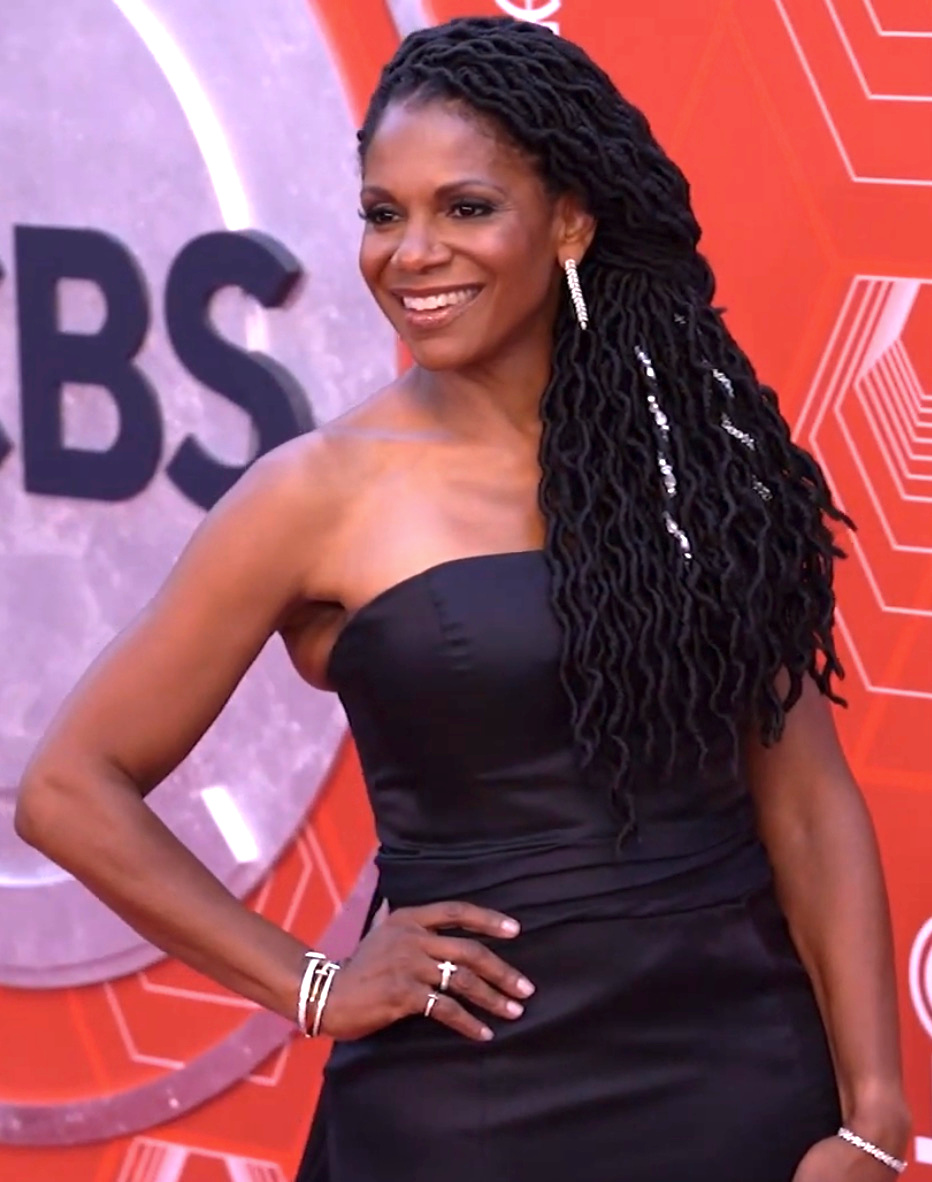
- McDonald at the 74th Tony Awards in 2021
- Born: Audra Ann McDonald; July 3, 1970 (age 56); West Berlin, West Germany
- Education: Juilliard School (BM)
- Occupations: Actress; singer
- Years active: 1994–present
- Spouses: Peter Donovan (m. 2000; div. 2009); Will Swenson (m. 2012)
- Children: 2
- Awards: Full list
- McDonald's speaking voice on researching for the role of Billie Holiday

Audra Ann McDonald (born July 3, 1970) is an American actress and singer. Known primarily for her work on the Broadway stage, she has won six Tony Awards, more performance wins than any other actor, and is the only person to win in all four acting categories. As of the 79th Tony Awards, she has earned a record-breaking eleven nominations.

In addition to her six Tony Awards, she has received numerous accolades including two Grammy Awards and an Emmy Award. She was honored with the National Medal of Arts in 2016 from President Barack Obama, and was inducted into the American Theater Hall of Fame in 2017.

She has performed in musicals, operas, and dramas. She has received six Tony Awards for her roles in Carousel (1994), Master Class (1996), Ragtime (1998), A Raisin in the Sun (2004), Porgy and Bess (2012), and Lady Day at Emerson's Bar and Grill (2014). Her other Tony-nominated roles were in Marie Christine (2000), 110 in the Shade (2007), Frankie and Johnny in the Clair de Lune (2020), Ohio State Murders (2023), and Gypsy (2025).

On television, she portrayed Dr. Naomi Bennett in the ABC series Private Practice from 2007 to 2011, and Liz Lawrence in The Good Wife and its spinoff series The Good Fight. She received Primetime Emmy Award nominations for her roles in Wit (2001), A Raisin in the Sun (2008), and Lady Day at Emerson's Bar and Grill (2016). She won the Primetime Emmy Award for Outstanding Special Class Program for hosting Live from Lincoln Center (2015). On film, she has acted in Annie (1999), Ricki and the Flash (2015), Beauty and the Beast (2017), Respect (2021), and Rustin (2023).

As a classical soprano, she has performed in staged operas with the Houston Grand Opera and the Los Angeles Opera, and in concerts with symphony orchestras like the Berlin Philharmonic and New York Philharmonic. Her recording of Kurt Weill's Rise and Fall of the City of Mahagonny (2008) with the Los Angeles Opera won the Grammy Award for Best Classical Album and the Grammy Award for Best Opera Recording. She maintains an active concert and recording career throughout the United States performing genres ranging from jazz standards to musical theater.

== Early life and education ==
Audra Ann McDonald was born on July 3, 1970 in West Berlin, West Germany, to American parents, Anna Kathryn (Jones), a university administrator, and Stanley James McDonald Jr., a high school principal. At the time of her birth, her father was stationed with the United States Army. McDonald was raised in her father's native Fresno, California, the elder of two daughters; her sister, Alison, writes and directs for television and film. McDonald graduated from the Roosevelt School of the Arts program within Theodore Roosevelt High School in Fresno.

She got her start in acting with Dan Pessano and Roger Rocka's Good Company Players, beginning in their junior company. In a feature article about her written when she was a child, she said that she knew she wanted to be involved in theater "when I had my first chance to perform with the Good Company Players Junior Company". She also said that the people who have had the most impact on her life are "Good Company director Dan Pessano and my mother". She studied classical voice as an undergraduate under Ellen Faull at the Juilliard School, graduating in 1993.

== Career ==
=== 1992–1999: Early work and breakthrough ===
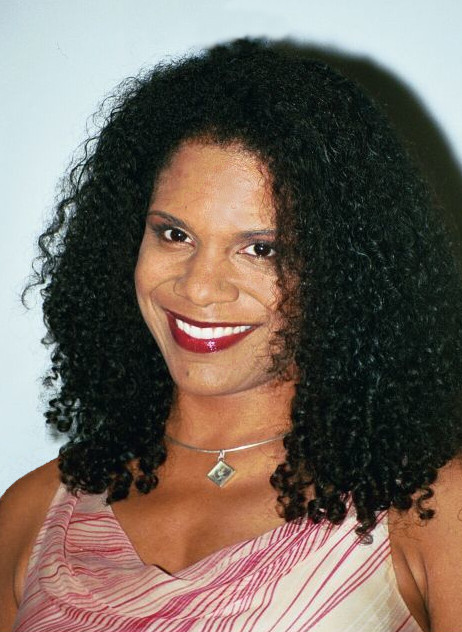
McDonald in 1998

McDonald made her Broadway debut as a replacement portraying Ayah in the musical The Secret Garden in from 1992 to 1993. For her role as Carrie Pipperidge in the Rodgers and Hammerstein musical Carousel (1994), she won her first Tony Award for Best Featured Actress in a Musical. The following year she played Sharon Graham in the Terrence McNally play Master Class (1995) earning her second Tony Award, this time for Best Featured Actress in a Play. Between 1996 and 1998 she played Sarah in the musical Ragtime, first at the Ford Centre for the Performing Arts in Toronto, from December 1996 to August 1997, and then at the Ford Center for the Performing Arts in New York from December 1997 to December 1998. For her performance in Ragtime, which had a book written by McNally, McDonald won her third Tony for Best Featured Actress in a Musical. In 1999 she played Marie Christine L'Adrese in the musical Marie Christine on Broadway and The Beggar Woman in Sweeney Todd: The Demon Barber of Fleet Street at Avery Fisher Hall in Lincoln Center.

McDonald has also made many television and film appearances, both musical and dramatic. In 1996 she made her film acting debut in Seven Servants by Daryush Shokof. After being cast in The Object of My Affection and Cradle Will Rock, in 1999, she appeared on the television series Homicide: Life on the Street; in television remake of Annie as Daddy Warbucks's secretary & soon-to-be wife, Miss Farrell; and in the television film Having Our Say: The Delany Sisters' First 100 Years. In 2000, McDonald acted in two episodes of Law & Order: Special Victims Unit and in the television film The Last Debate.

=== 2000–2010: Broadway stardom and acclaim ===
McDonald was a three-time Tony Award winner by age 28 for her performances in Carousel, Master Class, and Ragtime, placing her alongside Shirley Booth, Gwen Verdon and Zero Mostel by accomplishing this feat within five years. She was nominated for another Tony Award for her performance in Marie Christine before she won her fourth in 2004 for her role in A Raisin in the Sun, placing her in the company of then four-time winning actress Angela Lansbury. She reprised her Raisin role for a 2008 television adaptation, earning her a second Emmy Award nomination. McDonald would later score her fifth Tony Award win for her portrayal of Bess in Broadway's The Gershwins' Porgy and Bess, thus tying Angela Lansbury and Julie Harris, and her 2014 performance as Billie Holiday in Lady Day at Emerson's Bar and Grill would earn McDonald her sixth Tony award and make her the first person to win all four acting categories.

In 2001, she received her first Emmy Award nomination for Outstanding Supporting Actress in a Miniseries or Movie for the HBO film Wit, which starred Emma Thompson and was directed by Mike Nichols. In 2003, McDonald starred as Sarah Langley in It Runs in the Family, and as Jackie Brock in nine episodes of short-lived Mister Sterling. From 2005 to 2006, she acted in several television series and films, such as The Bedford Diaries and Kidnapped, while from 2007 to 2013 she played Dr. Naomi Bennett in Private Practice, a spinoff of Grey's Anatomy, replacing Merrin Dungey, who played the role in the series pilot. She sang with the New York Philharmonic in the annual New Year's Eve gala concert on December 31, 2006, featuring music from the films; it was televised on Live from Lincoln Center by PBS.

She has a close working relationship with composer Michael John LaChiusa who has written several works for her, including the Broadway musical Marie Christine, the opera Send (who are you? i love you), and The Seven Deadly Sins: A Song Cycle. With her full lyric soprano voice, McDonald appeared as Lizzie in the Roundabout Theatre Company's 2007 revival of 110 in the Shade, directed by Lonny Price at Studio 54, for which she shared the Drama Desk Award for Best Actress in a Musical with Donna Murphy. On April 29, 2007, while she was in previews for the show, her father was killed when an experimental aircraft he was flying crashed north of Sacramento, California.

McDonald is known for defying racial typecasting in her various Tony Award-winning and -nominated roles. Her performances as Carrie Pipperidge in Nicholas Hytner's 1994 revival of Carousel, Lizzie Curry in Lonny Price's 2007 revival of 110 in the Shade, and Rose in George C. Wolfe's revival of Gypsy have made her the first Black woman to portray those traditionally white roles in a major Broadway production. Of her groundbreaking work in encouraging diversity in musical theater casting, she said in an interview for The New York Times, "I refuse to be stereotyped. If I think I am right for a role I will go for it in whatever way I can. I refuse to say no to myself. I can't control what a producer will do or say but I can at least put myself out there." In a Talk of the Nation interview on NPR, Asian-American actor Thom Sesma said McDonald's performance in Carousel "transcended any kind of type at all", proving her to be "more actress than African-American."

McDonald has also performed in opera. In 2006 she made her opera debut at the Houston Grand Opera performing Francis Poulenc's La voix humaine and the world premiere of Michael John LaChiusa's one-woman opera Send (who are you? I love you). She had previously performed in the world premiere of John Adams' I Was Looking at the Ceiling and Then I Saw the Sky which was given in concert, and can be heard on the 1997 recording of the opera. In 2007 she performed the role of Jenny Smith in Kurt Weill's Rise and Fall of the City of Mahagonny at the Los Angeles Opera. Her performance was recorded and won the Grammy Award for Best Opera Recording in 2009. In 2008, McDonald starred as Ruth Younger in the critically acclaimed television film A Raisin in the Sun, and was nominated at the 60th Primetime Emmy Awards for Outstanding Supporting Actress in a Miniseries or Movie, and at the NAACP Image Award for Outstanding Actress in a Television Movie.

=== 2011–2019: Career expansion ===
McDonald appeared in a revised version of George Gershwin's opera Porgy and Bess, at the American Repertory Theatre (in Cambridge, Massachusetts) from August through September 2011, and recreated the role on Broadway at the Richard Rodgers Theatre, which opened on January 12, 2012, and closed on September 23, 2012. For this role, McDonald won her fifth Tony Award and her first in a Leading Actress category. This American Repertory Theater production was "re-imagined by Suzan-Lori Parks and Diedre Murray as a musical for contemporary audiences."

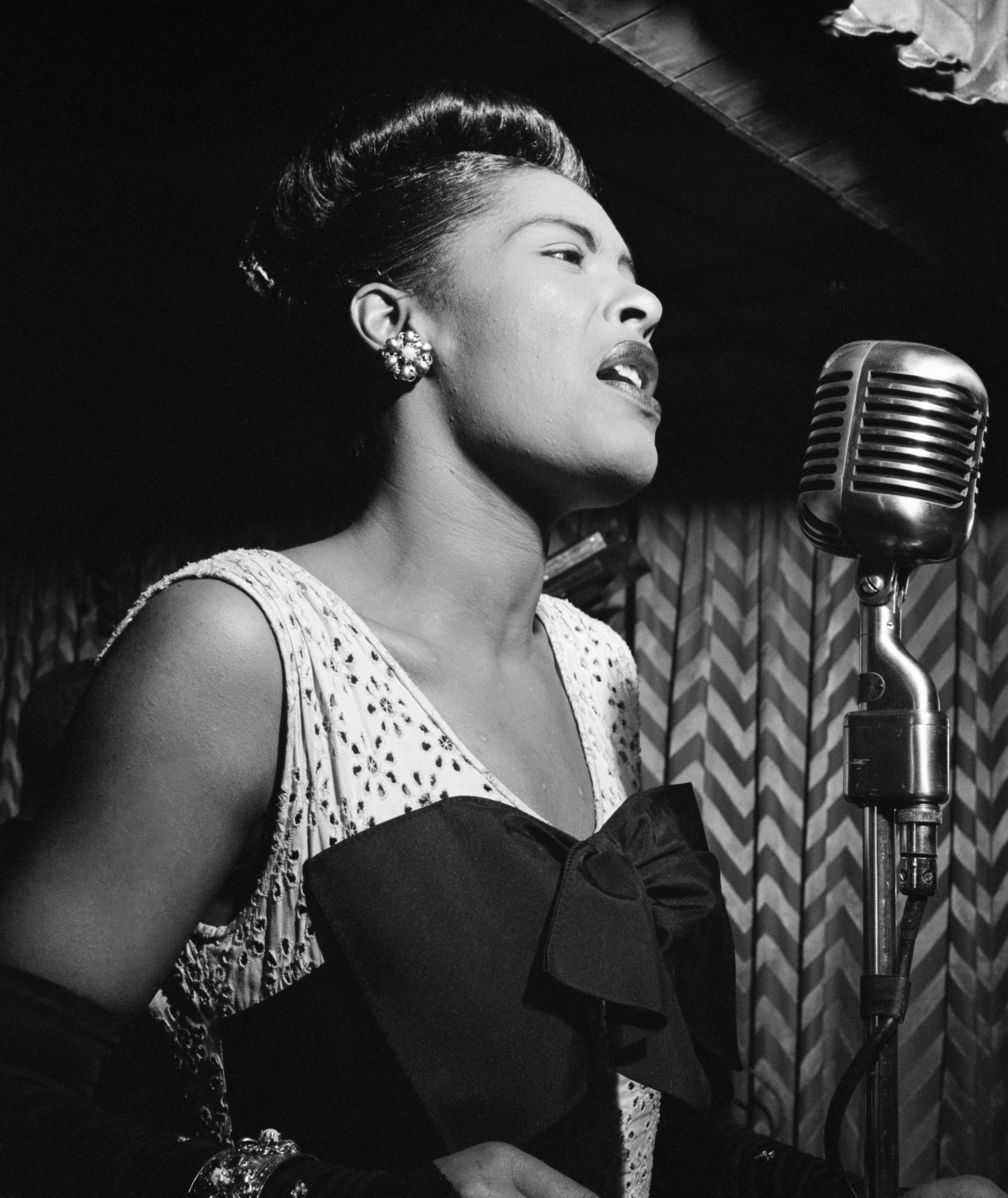
McDonald portrayed Billie Holiday on Broadway in Lady Day at Emerson's Bar and Grill (2014)

Since 2012, McDonald has served as host for the PBS series Live from Lincoln Center, for which she won a Primetime Emmy Award for Outstanding Special Class Program with the show's producers for Sweeney Todd, airing in 2015. In 2013, McDonald appeared in the HBO documentary Six by Sondheim, and she played Mother Abbess in the 2013 NBC live television production of The Sound of Music Live!. In 2014, she was featured in Lynn Nottage's short play Poof!, alongside Tonya Pinkins. It was produced for radio and podcast by Playing On Air.

McDonald played Billie Holiday on Broadway in the play Lady Day at Emerson's Bar and Grill in a limited engagement that ended on August 10, 2014. After previews that began on March 25, 2014, the play opened at the Circle in the Square Theatre on April 13, 2014. Of the play, McDonald said in an interview, "It's about a woman trying to get through a concert performance, which I know something about, and she's doing it at a time when her liver was pickled and she was still doing heroin regularly...I might have been a little judgmental about Billie Holiday early on in my life, but what I've come to admire most about her – and what is fascinating in this show – is that there is never any self-pity. She's almost laughing at how horrible her life has been. I don't think she sees herself as a victim. And she feels an incredible connection to her music – she can't sing a song if she doesn't have some emotional connection to it, which I really understand".

McDonald won the Tony Award for Best Actress in a Play for this role, making her the first person to earn six Tony Award wins for acting (not counting honorary awards) and the first person to win a Tony Award in all four acting categories. In her acceptance speech, "she thanked her parents for encouraging her to pursue her interests as a child." She also thanked the "strong and brave and courageous" African-American women who came before her, saying in part, "I am standing on Lena Horne's shoulders. I am standing on Maya Angelou's shoulders. I am standing on Diahann Carroll and Ruby Dee, and most of all, Billie Holiday. You deserved so much more than you were given when you were on this planet. This is for you, Billie." This performance was filmed at Cafe Brasil in New Orleans and broadcast on HBO on March 12, 2016. McDonald received critical acclaim and was nominated for the Primetime Emmy Award for Outstanding Lead Actress in a Limited or Anthology Series or Movie for her role in the broadcast. She lost to Sarah Paulson playing Marcia Clark in The People v. O. J. Simpson: American Crime Story. She was also nominated for the Screen Actors Guild Award for Outstanding Performance by a Female Actor in a Television Movie or Limited Series.

She appeared at the Williamstown Theatre Festival, Williamstown, Massachusetts, in Eugene O'Neill's play A Moon for the Misbegotten in August 2015, co-starring with her husband Will Swenson. In 2016, McDonald starred on Broadway as the vaudeville performer Lottie Gee in a new musical titled Shuffle Along, or, the Making of the Musical Sensation of 1921 and All That Followed about the making of the 1921 musical Shuffle Along. Shuffle Along closed on July 24, 2016, and McDonald began a maternity hiatus at that time.

McDonald had planned to make her West End debut as Holiday in Lady Day in June through September 2016, but after becoming pregnant she postponed these plans. She performed in Lady Day in June 2017 through September 9, 2017, at the Wyndham's Theatre in the West End. In 2017, McDonald starred in Disney's live action remake film Beauty and the Beast (based on the 1991 animated film of the same name) as Madame de Garderobe, directed by Bill Condon, and co-starring with Emma Watson and Dan Stevens, earning a nomination at the NAACP Image Award for Outstanding Supporting Actress in a Motion Picture. On August 1, 2017, it was announced that she had been added to the main cast for the second season of The Good Fight, reprising her role as Liz Lawrence from The Good Wife season 4. McDonald stayed in the cast for the remaining seasons, and was nominated twice for the Critics' Choice Television Award for Best Supporting Actress in a Drama Series. In 2019 McDonald played Frankie in Frankie and Johnny in the Clair de Lune at the Broadhurst Theatre, earning her ninth Tony Award nomination for her performance for Best Actress in a Play.

=== 2020–present ===
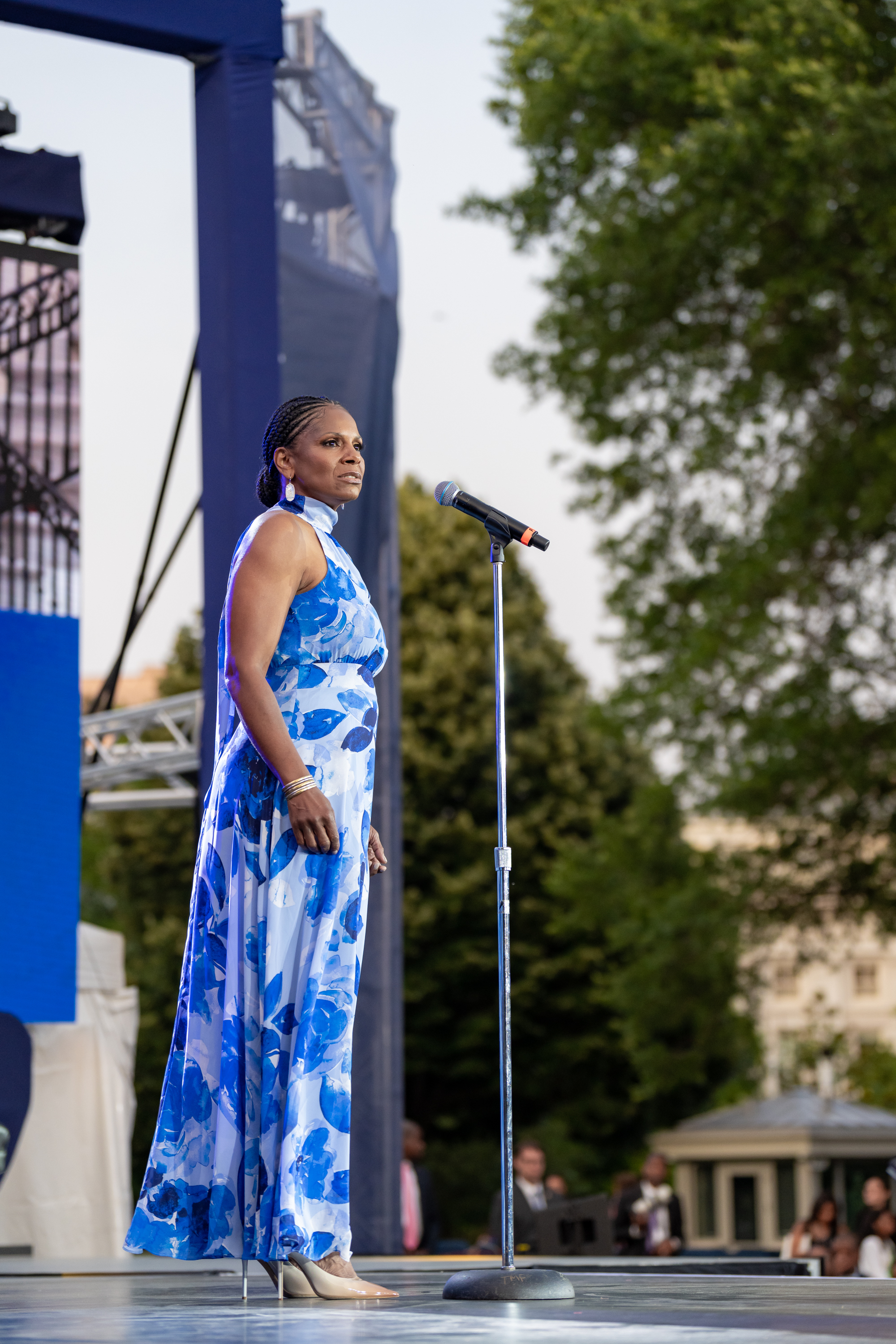
McDonald performing on the South Lawn of the White House in 2023

In 2021, McDonald portrayed Rachel Boutella in television series The Bite and hosted the television ceremony of the 74th Tony Awards. In 2021, she appeared as Barbara Siggers Franklin in Aretha Franklin's biographical musical drama film Respect, earning a nomination at the NAACP Image Award for Outstanding Supporting Actress in a Motion Picture. In 2022, she starred as Dorothy Scott in HBO's television series The Gilded Age. That year, she appeared in the Broadway production of Ohio State Murders, earning her tenth Tony Award nomination. In 2023, McDonald portrayed civil rights activist Ella Baker in the Netflix biographical drama Rustin. That same year she acted in the comedy Down Low and the Ava DuVernay directed drama Origin. In May 2024, it was announced that McDonald would return to Broadway as Mama Rose in a revival of Gypsy, with previews beginning November 21. Her performance in Gypsy would earn her a record-breaking eleventh Tony Award nomination, surpassing the previous three-way tie she had shared with Julie Harris and Chita Rivera.

== Recordings and concerts ==
McDonald has maintained ties to her classical training and repertoire. She frequently performs in concert throughout the U.S. and has performed with musical organizations such as the New York Philharmonic and the Mormon Tabernacle Choir. Carnegie Hall commissioned the song cycle The Seven Deadly Sins: A Song Cycle for McDonald, and she performed it at Carnegie's Zankel Hall on June 2, 2004. She sang two solo one-act operas at the Houston Grand Opera in March 2006: Francis Poulenc's La voix humaine and the world premiere of Michael John LaChiusa's Send (who are you? I love you). On February 10, 2007, McDonald starred with Patti LuPone in the Los Angeles Opera production of Kurt Weill's opera Rise and Fall of the City of Mahagonny directed by John Doyle. The recording of this production of Mahagonny won two Grammy Awards, for Best Opera Recording and Best Classical Album in February 2009.

In September 2008, American composer Michael John LaChiusa was quoted in Opera News Online, as working on an adaptation of Bizet's Carmen with McDonald in mind.

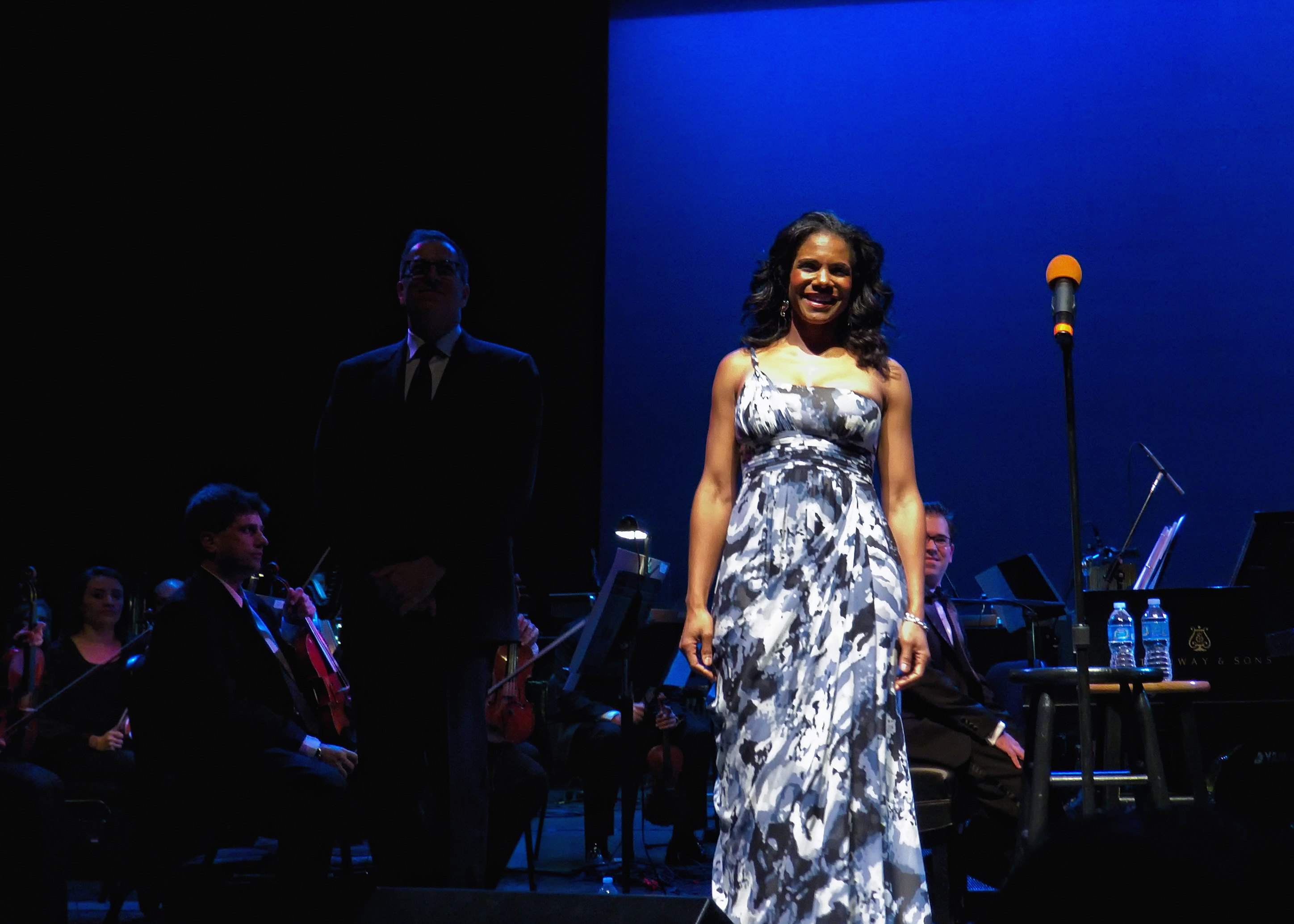
McDonald performing at the Wright Center in 2011

McDonald has recorded five solo albums for Nonesuch Records. Her first, the 1998 Way Back to Paradise, featured songs written by a new generation of musical theatre composers who had achieved varying degrees of prominence in the 1990s, particularly LaChiusa, Adam Guettel and Jason Robert Brown.

Her next album, How Glory Goes (2000), combined both old and new works, and included composers Harold Arlen, Leonard Bernstein and Jerome Kern. Her third album, Happy Songs (2002), was big band music from the 1920s through the 1940s. Her fourth album, Build a Bridge (2006), features songs from jazz and pop.

In May 2013, Audra McDonald released her first solo album in seven years, Go Back Home, with a title track from the Kander and Ebb musical The Scottsboro Boys. To coincide with the album's release, McDonald performed a concert at Avery Fisher Hall in New York City that aired on the PBS series Live from Lincoln Center titled Audra McDonald In Concert: Go Back Home.

At the 2010 BCS National Championship Game on January 7, McDonald sang America the Beautiful for the sold-out stadium fans to celebrate the final game of the college football season.

In May 2000, Audra McDonald appeared as "The Beggar Woman" in Lonny Price's concert version of Stephen Sondheim's Sweeney Todd: The Demon Barber of Fleet Street, performed at Avery Fisher Hall at Lincoln Center, New York, with the New York Philharmonic with George Hearn and Patti LuPone. She reprised the role in some performances of the March 2014 Lincoln Center concert production, again directed by Price, this time opposite Bryn Terfel and Emma Thompson. She performed three concerts, titled "Audra McDonald Sings Broadway", in the Sydney Opera House in November 2015, which also included "The Facebook Song" by Kate Miller-Heidke. In late December 2023, McDonald was a guest narrator at Disney's Candlelight Processional at Walt Disney World.

== Personal life ==
McDonald married bassist Peter Donovan in September 2000. They have one daughter, Zoe Madeline Donovan, named after McDonald's close friend and Master Class co-star Zoe Caldwell and the late Madeline Kahn. McDonald became close friends with Kahn after they filmed a TV pilot together, and she found out she was carrying a girl the same day she sang at Kahn's memorial. McDonald and Donovan divorced in 2009.

She married Will Swenson on October 6, 2012. On October 19, 2016, she gave birth to their daughter, Sally James McDonald-Swenson. She is the stepmother to Swenson's two sons from his previous marriage.

McDonald attended Joan Rivers' funeral in New York on September 7, 2014, where she sang "Smile".

As of 2014, McDonald resides with her family in Croton-on-Hudson, New York.

== Activism and charitable work ==
In October 2020, McDonald joined many other Broadway stars in a virtual voter education and letter-writing party sponsored by VoteRiders to raise awareness about voter ID requirements.

In June 2020, McDonald and a coalition of professionals from across the theatre industry launched Black Theatre United, an organization whose mission is to inspire reform and combat systemic racism within the theatre community and throughout the nation. Emphasizing four goals – awareness, accountability, advocacy, and action – BTU works at the community and national levels to elevate anti-racist causes and support the Black community through various resources and initiatives.

McDonald joined other Broadway stars including Lin-Manuel Miranda, Josh Groban, Idina Menzel, Laura Benanti, and Kristin Chenoweth in 2018 to record Singing You Home, a bilingual children's album designed to benefit organizations that aid families separated at the border.

She joined the Covenant House board of Directors in 2014. Covenant House oversees programs for homeless youth in 27 cities in six countries across the United States, Canada, and Latin America. Audra was the recipient of their 2018 Beacon of Hope Award.

== Acting credits ==
Key
†	Denotes works that have not yet been released

=== Stage ===
Year	Show	Role	Notes
1992	The Secret Garden	Ayah (replacement)	St. James Theatre; 1992 – January 3, 1993
1994–1995	Carousel	Carrie Pipperidge	Vivian Beaumont Theater; February 18, 1994 – January 15, 1995
1995	Master Class	Sharon Graham	Philadelphia Theatre Company; March 1995
1995	Something Wonderful	Performer	Gershwin Theatre; July 12, 1995
1995–1997	Master Class	Sharon Graham	John Golden Theatre; October 26, 1995 – June 29, 1997
1996–1999	Ragtime	Sarah	Ford Centre for the Performing Arts (Toronto); December 8, 1996 – August 31, 1997
1996–1999	Ragtime	Sarah	Ford Center for the Performing Arts (Broadway); December 26, 1997 – October 29, 1999
1999	Marie Christine	Marie Christine L'Adrese	Vivian Beaumont Theater; October 30, 1999 – January 9, 2000
2000	Ragtime	Sarah	Ford Center for the Performing Arts January 10–16, 2000
2000	Sweeney Todd: The Demon Barber of Fleet Street	Lucy Barker, The Beggar Woman	Avery Fisher Hall, Lincoln Center; May 4–6, 2000
2001	Dreamgirls	Deena Jones	New York Actor's Fund Benefit Concert
2002	Carousel	Julie Jordan	Carnegie Hall; June 6, 2002
2003	Passion	Clara	Ravinia Festival; August 22–23, 2003
2003–2004	Henry IV, Part 1	Lady Kate Percy	Vivian Beaumont Theater; October 28, 2003 – January 18, 2004
2004	A Raisin in the Sun	Ruth Younger	Royale Theatre; March 30 – July 11, 2004
2004	The Seven Deadly Sins: A Song Cycle	Performer	Carnegie Hall; June 2, 2004
2004	R shomon	Young Woman	Williamstown Theatre Festival; July 21 - August 1, 2004
2004	Sunday in the Park with George	Dot / Marie	Ravinia Festival; September 3–4, 2004
2005	Passion	Clara	Lincoln Center; March 30 – April 1, 2005
2005	Wonderful Town	Eileen Sherwood	Berlin Philharmonic
2005	Anyone Can Whistle	Nurse Fay Apple	Ravinia Festival; August 26–27, 2005
2006	La voix humaine/Send (who are you? I love you)	Singer	Houston Grand Opera March 2006
2007	Rise and Fall of the City of Mahagonny	Jenny Smith	Los Angeles Opera; February 2007
2007	110 in the Shade	Lizzie Curry	Studio 54; April 13 – July 29, 2007
2009	Twelfth Night	Olivia	Delacorte Theater; June 25 – July 12, 2009
2011	Porgy and Bess	Bess	American Repertory Theater; August – September 2011
2011–2012	Porgy and Bess	Bess	Richard Rodgers Theatre; December 17, 2011 – September 23, 2012
2014	Sweeney Todd: The Demon Barber of Fleet Street	Lucy Barker, The Beggar Woman	Avery Fisher Hall, Lincoln Center; March 5–8, 2014
2014	Lady Day at Emerson's Bar and Grill	Billie Holiday	Circle in the Square Theatre; March 25 – October 5, 2014
2015	A Moon for the Misbegotten	Josie Hogan	Williamstown Theatre Festival; August 2015
2016	Shuffle Along	Lottie Gee	Music Box Theatre; March 14 – July 24, 2016
2017	Lady Day at Emerson's Bar and Grill	Billie Holiday	Wyndham's Theatre; June 27 – September 9, 2017
2019	Frankie and Johnny in the Clair de Lune	Frankie	Broadhurst Theatre; May 4 – July 28, 2019
2022–2023	Ohio State Murders	Suzanne Alexander	James Earl Jones Theatre; November 11, 2022 – January 15, 2023
2023	Ragtime [concert production]	Sarah	Minskoff Theatre; March 27, 2023
2024	Gutenberg! The Musical!	The Guest Producer	James Earl Jones Theatre January 28, 2024
2024–2025	Gypsy	Rose Thompson Hovick	Majestic Theatre; November 21, 2024 – August 17, 2025
2026	Shuffle Along	Lottie Gee	Lincoln Center; September 27, 2026

=== Film ===
Year	Film	Role	Notes
1996	Seven Servants	Opera Singer	
1998	The Object of My Affection	Wedding Singer	
1999	Cradle Will Rock	Blitzstein – "Joe Worker" Singer	
2003	It Runs in the Family	Sarah Langley	
2003	Tea Time with Roy & Sylvia	Sylvia	Short film
2004	The Best Thief in the World	Ruth	
2009	She Got Problems	Herself	Short film
2011	Rampart	Sarah	
2015	Ricki and the Flash	Maureen Brummel	
2017	Beauty and the Beast	Madame de Garderobe	also voice
2017	Hello Again	Sally	
2020	Song of Rapa Nui	Narrator	Voice; documentary
2021	Respect	Barbara Siggers Franklin	
2023	Down Low	Patty	
2023	Rustin	Ella Baker	
2023	Origin	Miss Hale	
2023	Whitney Houston in Focus	Narrator	Voice; documentary short
TBA	Love Love †		Filming

=== Television ===
Year	Title	Role	Notes
1999	Having Our Say: The Delany Sisters' First 100 Years	Young Bessie Delany	Television film
1999	Homicide: Life on the Street	Teresa Giardello	Episode: "Forgive Us Our Trespasses"
1999	Annie	Grace Farrell	Television film
2000	Law & Order: Special Victims Unit	Audrey Jackson	2 episodes
2000	The Last Debate	Barbara Manning	Television film
2001	Wit	Susie Monahan	Television film
2003	Mister Sterling	Jackie Brock	Main cast (9 episodes)
2005	Passion: Live From Lincoln Center	Clara	Television special
2006	The Bedford Diaries	Professor Carla Bonatelle	8 episodes
2006–2007	Kidnapped	Jackie Hayes	3 episodes
2007–2013	Private Practice	Dr. Naomi Bennett	Main cast (77 episodes)
2007–2024	Great Performances	Herself	9 episodes
2008	A Raisin in the Sun	Ruth Younger	Television film
2009	Grey's Anatomy	Dr. Naomi Bennett	Episode: "Before and After"
2009	The Music Instinct: Science and Song	Narrator	Voice; television documentary
2010	Submissions Only	Tracy Mintzer	Episode: "Dangerous Anaesthesia"
2012–2020	Sesame Street	Chicken (singing voice)/ Zookeeper	10 episodes
2013	It Could Be Worse	Sharon	Episode: "Starring Veronica Bailey"
2013	The Good Wife	Liz Lawrence	Episode: "Runnin' with the Devil"
2013	Audra McDonald: Go Back Home	Self	Television special
2013	The Sound of Music Live!	Mother Abbess	Television special
2013	The Ordained	Anthea	Television film
2014	Sweeney Todd: The Demon Barber of Fleet Street	Lucy Barker	Television special
2015	Doc McStuffins	Itty Bitty Bess	Voice, episode: "Itty Bitty Bess Takes Flight"
2016	Lady Day at Emerson's Bar and Grill	Billie Holiday	Television special
2016	Once Upon a Sesame Street Christmas	Caroler	Television special
2017	Saving My Tomorrow	Narrator	Voice, episode: "Kids Who Love the Earth"
2018	RuPaul's Drag Race	Herself (Guest Judge)	Episode: "Snatch Game"
2018–2019	BoJack Horseman	Mother Superior	Voice, 2 episodes
2018–2022	The Good Fight	Liz Lawrence-Reddick	Main cast (47 episodes)
2019	An Emmy for Megan	Herself	Episode: "New Minimum Length"
2020	American Experience	Additional Voices	Episode: "The Vote Part 2"
2020	Central Park	Ashley	Voice, episode: "A Fish Called Snakehead"
2020	Vampirina	Medusa	Voice, episode: "Vee and the Family Stone"
2021	The Bite	Rachel Boutella	Main cast (6 episodes)
2021	74th Tony Awards	Herself (host)	Television special
2022–2025	The Gilded Age	Dorothy Scott	17 episodes

== Accolades and achievements ==
Over her career she has received six Tony Awards out of eleven nominations (the most of any performer in the history of the Tony Awards), two Grammy Awards out of three nominations, one Emmy Award out of five nominations in addition to nominations for two Screen Actors Guild Awards. She was honored with the National Medal of Arts in 2016 from President Barack Obama, and was inducted into the American Theater Hall of Fame in 2017. McDonald received the Golden Plate Award of the American Academy of Achievement presented by Awards Council member General Colin Powell in 2012.

On September 22, 2016, McDonald was awarded the National Medal of Arts by President Barack Obama for 2015. The Award states, in part: "for lighting up Broadway as one of its brightest stars.... In musicals, concerts, operas, and the recording studio, her rich, soulful voice continues to take her audiences to new heights." That same year, she also received an honorary degree from Yale University. In 2017, she was inducted into the American Theater Hall of Fame. McDonald served as the grand marshal of the 2024 Tournament of Roses Parade. In 2026, she received an honorary degree from Harvard University.

== Concerts ==
Audra McDonald in Concert (2013–14)

Date	City	State	Venue
March 9, 2013	Chicago	Illinois	Lund Auditorium
March 16, 2013	Boca Raton	Florida	Mizner Park Amphitheater
April 6, 2013	Stamford	Connecticut	Palace Theatre
May 16, 2013	Norfolk	Virginia	Attucks Theatre
May 24, 2013	New York City	New York	Stern Auditorium
October 5, 2013	New York City	New York	Colden Auditorium
October 10, 2013	Washington, D.C.		Library of Congress
October 12, 2013	Chicago	Illinois	Symphony Center
October 19, 2013	Louisville	Kentucky	Brown Theatre
October 20, 2013	Austin	Texas	Michael & Susan Dell Hall
October 22, 2013	Las Vegas	Nevada	Reynolds Hall
October 25, 2013	San Diego	California	Balboa Theatre
October 26, 2013	Los Angeles	California	Dorothy Chandler Pavilion
November 15, 2013	St. Louis	Missouri	Sheldon Concert Hall
November 16, 2013	Kansas City	Missouri	Muriel Kauffman Theatre
December 21, 2013	Mesa	Arizona	Ikeda Theater
January 5, 2014, & February 26, 2014	West Palm Beach	Florida	Dreyfoos, Jr. Concert Hall
January 18, 2014	Rohnert Park	California	Joan and Sanford Weill Hall
February 1, 2014	Washington, D.C.		Library of Congress
February 22, 2014	Worcester	Massachusetts	Hanover Theatre
February 28, 2014	Visalia	California	L.J. Williams Theater
March 8, 2014	Atlanta	Georgia	Atlanta Symphony Hall

23 concerts total; the gap between May and October 2013 is due to McDonald's work with television and her album coming out, causing the three and a half month gap. The tour ended due to McDonald's show, Lady Day at Emerson's Bar and Grill opening on Broadway, but she picked up again with a new tour once the show closed.

An Evening with Audra McDonald (2014–15)

Date	City	Country	Venue
December 2, 2014	Los Angeles	United States	Walt Disney Concert Hall
December 5, 2014	Rohnert Park	United States	Joan and Sanford Weill Hall
December 6, 2014	Berkeley	United States	Zellerbach Hall
December 12, 2014	New York City	United States	Stern Auditorium
January 8, 2015	Ft. Lauderdale	United States	Parker Playhouse
January 17, 2015	Rochester	United States	Kodak Hall
January 24, 2015	Naples	United States	Hayes Hall
February 6, 2015	Chapel Hill	United States	UNC Memorial Hall
February 21, 2015	Des Moines	United States	Des Moines Civic Center
February 27, 2015	Kohler	United States	Kohler Memorial Theatre
March 1, 2015	Boston	United States	Boston Symphony Hall
March 12, 2015	Richmond	United States	EKU Auditorium
March 15, 2015	Tucson	United States	Fox Tucson Theatre
March 21, 2015	Jacksonville	United States	Jacoby Symphony Hall
March 22, 2015	Sarasota	United States	Van Wezel Hall
March 24, 2015	West Palm Beach	United States	Dreyfoos, Jr. Concert Hall
March 27, 2015	Bethesda	United States	The Music Center at Strathmore
April 7, 2015	Indiana	United States	Indiana University Auditorium
April 15, 2015	Pittsburgh	United States	Byham Theater
April 17, 2015	Princeton	United States	McCarter Theatre
April 19, 2015	Newark	United States	Prudential Hall
April 23, 2015	Greenville	United States	Peace Concert Hall
April 29, 2015	New York City	United States	Stern Auditorium
May 8, 2015	Englewood	United States	Bergen Performing Arts Center
May 9, 2015	Greenvale	United States	Tilles Center Concert Hall
May 11, 2015	Pittsburgh	United States	Byham Theater
May 15, 2015	Norfolk	United States	Virginia Arts Festival
June 12, 2015	Saratoga	United States	Mountain Winery
June 22, 2015	Vienna	United States	Wolf Trap
July 19, 2015	Lenox	United States	The Shed
September 1, 2015, & September 3, 2015	Los Angeles	United States	Hollywood Bowl
October 1, 2015	Richmond	United States	Carpenter Theater
October 7, 2015	Philadelphia	United States	Merriam Theater
October 8, 2015	Storrs	United States	Jorgenson Center
October 13, 2015	Greenville	United States	Peace Concert Hall
October 31, 2015	Melbourne	Australia	Hamer Hall

37 concerts; this tour marked her Australian debut. The lack of August shows was due to her run in A Moon for the Misbegotten.

Other concerts

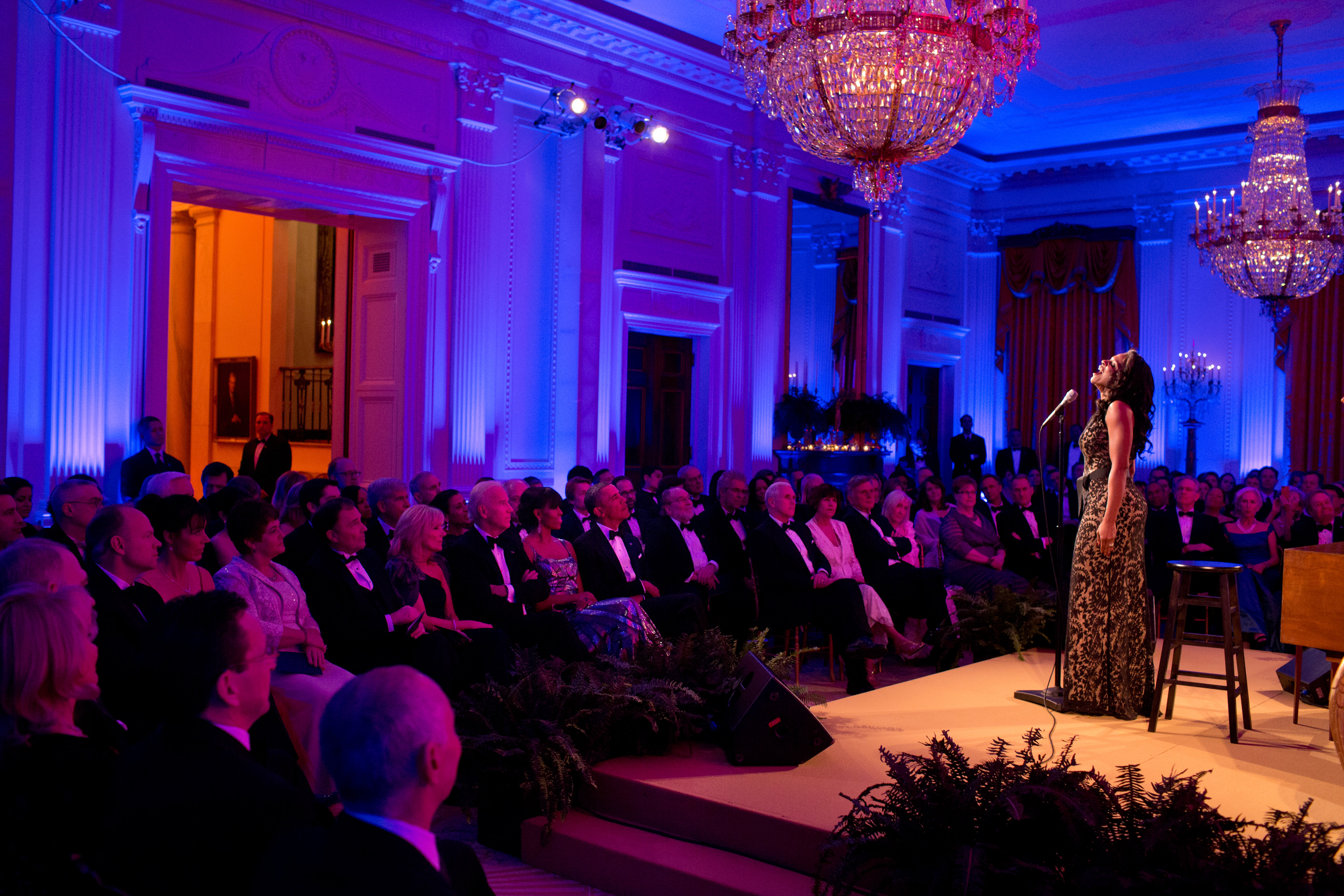
McDonald in the East Room of the White House, 2013

- 1999 – Audra McDonald: Live at the Donmar London (filmed for a DVD)
- February, 2002, Live with the Utah Symphony Abravanel Hall Salt Lake City, Utah (part of the 2002 Winter Olympics Arts Festival)
- June 2, 2004 – The Seven Deadly Sins: A Song Cycle at Carnegie Hall
- August 26, 2007 – Ravinia Festival
- March 28, 2008 – Savannah Music Festival
- March 30, 2008 – Ferst Center for the Arts
- April 26, 2008 – Stanley Theater
- May 30, 2008 – Zellerbach Hall
- February 1, 2010 – Ralph Freud Playhouse
- April 26, 2010 – Louise M. Davies Symphony Hall
- July 18, 2010 – Ozawa Hall in Boston
- October 22, 2011 – Carnegie Hall
- November 8, 2011 – Curtis M Phillips Center for Performing Arts
- April 20, 2012 – New Jersey Performing Arts Center
- January 2, 2016 – Parker Playhouse
- January 17, 2016 – Leicester Square Theatre
- November 17, 2018 – Hill Auditorium, Ann Arbor, MI
- October 7–8, 2019 – Noorda Center for Performing Art at Utah Valley University, Orem, UT
- September 25, 2022 – The London Palladium (recorded and broadcast on PBS' Great Performances on May 17, 2024)
- June 25, 2023 – Warnor's Center for the Performing Arts, Fresno, California

== Discography ==
=== Solo recordings ===
- Way Back to Paradise (Nonesuch, 1998)
- How Glory Goes (2000)
- Happy Songs (2002)
- Build a Bridge (2006)
- Go Back Home (2013)
- Sing Happy (2018)

=== Featured recordings ===
- Dawn Upshaw Sings Rodgers & Hart – duet on "Why Can't I?" (1996)
- Leonard Bernstein's New York – duet with Mandy Patinkin on "A Little Bit in Love" and "Tonight" (1996)
- George and Ira Gershwin: Standards and Gems – sings "How Long Has This Been Going On?" (1998)
- George Gershwin: The 100th Birthday Celebration – sings Porgy and Bess selections (1998)
- Myths and Hymns – sings "Pegasus" (1999)
- My Favorite Broadway: The Leading Ladies – sings "The Webber Love Trio" (1999)
- Broadway In Love – sings "You Were Meant For Me" from The Object of My Affection (2000)
- Broadway Cares: Home for the Holidays – sings "White Christmas" (2001)
- Bright Eyed Joy: The Songs Of Ricky Ian Gordon – sings "Daybreak in Alabama" (2001)
- Zeitgeist – sings "Think Twice" (2005)
- The Wonder of Christmas with the Mormon Tabernacle Choir (2004)
- Barbara Cook at the Met – sings "When Did I Fall In Love?" and "Blue Skies" (2006)
- Jule Styne in Hollywood – sings "10,432 Sheep" (2006)
- Sondheim: The Birthday Concert – sings "Too Many Mornings" and "The Glamorous Life" (2010)
- Stages – duet on "If I Loved You", 2014

=== Cast recordings ===
- Carousel (1994 Broadway Revival Cast Recording) (1994)
- Ragtime (Original Cast Recording) (1998)
- I Was Looking at the Ceiling and Then I Saw the Sky by John Adams (Studio Cast Recording) (1998)
- Wonderful Town (Berlin Cast Recording) (1999)
- Marie Christine (Original Cast Recording) (1999)
- Sweeney Todd Live at the New York Philharmonic (2000)
- Dreamgirls in Concert (2001 Concert Cast Recording) (released February 2002)
- Wonderful Town (Studio Recording) (2005)
- 110 in the Shade (2007 Broadway Revival Cast Recording) (2007)
- Rise and Fall of the City of Mahagonny (Concert Cast Recording) (2007)
- Rodgers and Hammerstein's Allegro (First Complete Recording) (2009)
- The Gershwins' Porgy and Bess (New Broadway Cast Recording) (2012)
- Lady Day at Emerson's Bar and Grill (Original Broadway Cast Recording) (2014)
- Gypsy Starring Audra McDonald (2024 Broadway Cast Recording) (2025)

=== Video recordings ===
- Audra McDonald – Live at the Donmar London, VHS (1999)
- My Favorite Broadway: The Leading Ladies ("The Webber Love Trio"), DVD & CD (1999)
- Bernstein – Wonderful Town with Kim Criswell, Thomas Hampson, Wayne Marshall, Simon Rattle, and Berlin Philharmonic, DVD (2005)
- The Wonder of Christmas with the Mormon Tabernacle Choir and Orchestra at Temple Square, DVD (2005)
- Weill – Rise and Fall of the City of Mahagonny, DVD (2007)
- Sondheim! The Birthday Concert, Blu-ray DVD (2010)

=== Audio books ===
- Alice Walker, By the Light of My Father's Smile (1998)
- Connie Briscoe, A Long Way from Home (1999)
- Rita Dove, "Second-Hand Man", part of the Selected Shorts story anthology Getting There from Here (2004)
- Jodi Picoult, Small Great Things (2016)
- Emily Wilson, The Iliad (2023)

== See also ==
- African-American Tony nominees and winners
- List of Tony Award records
