= Respect (2021 film) =

American biographical musical drama film by Liesl Tommy

- Theatrical release poster
- Directed by: Liesl Tommy
- Screenplay by: Tracey Scott Wilson
- Story by: Callie Khouri; Tracey Scott Wilson
- Produced by: Harvey Mason Jr.; Scott Bernstein; Jonathan Glickman; Stacey Sher
- Starring: Jennifer Hudson; Forest Whitaker; Marlon Wayans; Audra McDonald; Marc Maron; Tituss Burgess; Mary J. Blige
- Cinematography: Kramer Morgenthau
- Edited by: Avril Beukes
- Music by: Kris Bowers
- Production companies: Metro-Goldwyn-Mayer Pictures; Bron Creative; Glickmania; One Community
- Distributed by: United Artists Releasing
- Release dates: August 8, 2021 (Los Angeles); August 13, 2021 (United States)
- Running time: 145 minutes
- Country: United States
- Language: English
- Budget: $55 million
- Box office: $35.8 million

Respect is a 2021 American biographical musical drama film directed by Liesl Tommy (in her feature directorial debut), written by Tracey Scott Wilson and Callie Khouri, based on the life of American singer Aretha Franklin. The film stars Jennifer Hudson as Franklin, with Forest Whitaker, Marlon Wayans, Audra McDonald, Marc Maron, Tituss Burgess, and Mary J. Blige in supporting roles. The film follows the first three decades of Franklin's life, from being born as a musical prodigy in an affluent African-American family, the repercussions of losing her mother at age 10 to her arduous rise to international musical stardom, while enduring an abusive marriage, ultimately concluding with the recording of her influential live album Amazing Grace (1972).

A film on Franklin's life was in development for a long time with Franklin herself involved in the pre-production, but the film languished in development hell for years due to lack of finding a suitable candidate. Following release of the musical film Dreamgirls (2006), Franklin asked Hudson to play her but did not finalize her decision until seeing her in the Broadway musical The Color Purple. The film began production in early 2019 and had concluded by February 2020. The film is dedicated to Franklin, who died in 2018.

After much delay and postponement, due to the burgeoning COVID-19 pandemic, Respect premiered in Los Angeles on August 8, 2021, and was released theatrically in the United States on August 13, 2021, by United Artists Releasing, and in other territories by Universal Pictures. The film received generally positive reviews from critics, with praise for the performances, the film's production values, and costume design, but received criticism for its screenplay and long running time.

== Plot ==
In 1952, 10-year-old Aretha Franklin lives with her father C.L., pastor of Detroit's largest Baptist church, and her siblings Cecil, Erma, and Carolyn. Aretha's father often has her sing for parties at their home, while her mother Barbara, separated from C.L., encourages her independence. The predatory actions of a family friend, combined with the sudden death of Barbara, traumatize Aretha, who ceases to speak for weeks until her father demands that she sing at church.

Seven years later, Aretha is a teen mother of two boys, but refuses to name their father. Touring as a gospel singer with family friend Martin Luther King Jr., she meets local producer Ted White, but C.L. warns him to stay away. C.L. surprises Aretha with a meeting with Columbia Records executive John Hammond. She accepts a contract to record jazz standards, including "Ac-Cent-Tchu-Ate the Positive."

Four albums later, Aretha lacks a signature hit. At a club, she attempts to honor family friend Dinah Washington by performing one of Dinah's songs; Dinah is outraged, but advises Aretha to find songs that move her. Struggling with the controlling influence of her father, Aretha begins a relationship with Ted. She brings him home to meet her family and C.L. nearly shoots him. She announces Ted as her manager.

Two years later, Ted and Aretha are married with a child. After nine albums with no real success, Aretha is dropped by Columbia. Ted secures a deal with veteran producer Jerry Wexler of Atlantic Records, who introduces her to the Muscle Shoals Rhythm Section in 1967. They record "I Never Loved A Man (The Way I Love You)", but afterwards Ted jealously beats her.

Returning to Detroit with a black eye, Aretha reconnects with her family. Realizing her song has been released, becoming her first hit, Aretha takes a more hands-on role in her career. She makes her sisters her new backup singers and, despite their misgivings, reunites with Ted. Aretha, Erma and Carolyn are inspired to re-arrange Otis Redding's "Respect"; their version becomes a No. 1 single, launching Aretha to stardom by her 25th birthday.

At a Detroit concert, Dr. King honors Aretha for her support of the Civil Rights Movement, proclaiming February 16 "Aretha Franklin Day". She has another signature hit, "(You Make Me Feel Like) A Natural Woman", but her career is complicated by Ted's increasingly volatile behavior. Embarking on a European tour in 1968, Aretha is confronted with a Time magazine cover story about Ted's abuse, and finally casts him out of her life.

Dating her tour manager Ken Cunningham, Aretha eventually has her fourth child. In the wake of Dr. King's assassination, Aretha's father drunkenly argues with her over the direction of the Movement, telling her that she no longer walks in the Spirit. Aretha continues to release hits but overworks herself, coping with the pressure through alcohol, and rejects her family's attempts to help her.

During a performance in Columbus, Georgia, a drunken Aretha falls from the stage. On a downward spiral and estranged from Ken and her family, she is consoled by a vision of her late mother. Aretha finds the strength to quit drinking, leading Ken to reconcile with her, and returns to her gospel roots. She approaches Wexler with the idea to produce her own gospel album, and he agrees on the condition that the recording of the album be filmed for a documentary.

Beginning rehearsals, Aretha confides in family friend James Cleveland, now a respected gospel artist. The day of the album's recording, her father arrives to reconcile with her. The service begins and, with her family in attendance, Aretha sings her arrangement of the hymn, Amazing Grace. An epilog reveals Aretha Franklin's legacy as a world-famous artist and the "Queen of Soul".

== Cast ==
- Jennifer Hudson as Aretha Franklin
  - Skye Dakota Turner as young Aretha
- Forest Whitaker as C. L. Franklin, Aretha's father
- Marlon Wayans as Ted White, Aretha's abusive husband and manager
- Audra McDonald as Barbara Siggers Franklin, Aretha's mother
- Marc Maron as Jerry Wexler
- Tituss Burgess as James Cleveland
- Mary J. Blige as Dinah Washington
- Saycon Sengbloh as Erma Franklin, Aretha's older sister
  - Kennedy Chanel as young Erma
- Hailey Kilgore as Carolyn Franklin, Aretha's younger sister
  - Nevaeh Moore as young Carolyn
- Heather Headley as Clara Ward
- Tate Donovan as John Hammond
- Kimberly Scott as Mama Franklin, Aretha's grandmother
- Myk Watford as Rick Hall
- Albert Jones as Ken Cunningham
- Leroy McClain as Cecil Franklin, Aretha's older brother
  - Peyton Jackson as young Cecil
- Kelvin Hair as Sam Cooke
- Lodric D. Collins as Smokey Robinson
- Gilbert Glenn Brown as Martin Luther King Jr.
- Brenda Nicole Moorer as Brenda Franklin-Corbett, Aretha's cousin
- Jelani Alladin as Jason

== Production ==
The project had been long in development, with Jennifer Hudson set to play Aretha Franklin. Franklin herself was involved with the development up until her death on August 16, 2018. She stated that Hudson would win an Oscar for the portrayal. In January 2019, Liesl Tommy was set to direct the film. The rest of the cast was added in October 2019, including Forest Whitaker, Marlon Wayans, Audra McDonald and Mary J. Blige.

In a June 2019 slate deal, MGM added Bron Creative as a co-financing and producing company to this film. Filming began in Atlanta, Georgia, on September 2, 2019, and wrapped on February 15, 2020. Jonathan Glickman, MGM's President of the Motion Picture Group, exited the company on February 1, 2020, with a first-look deal starting with the film.

=== Music ===
The film's soundtrack features one original song, "Here I Am (Singing My Way Home)", performed by Hudson. Written by Hudson, Carole King, and Jamie Hartman and produced by will.i.am and Johnny Goldstein, the song was released on June 18, 2021. "Here I Am (Singing My Way Home)" peaked at number 21 on the Billboard Adult R&B Songs chart dated August 28, 2021. The soundtrack album was released on August 13 via Epic Records.

== Release ==
Respect premiered in Los Angeles on August 8, 2021, and was theatrically released in the United States on August 13, 2021. It was originally scheduled for a limited release on December 25, 2020, followed by an expansion on January 8, 2021, before going wide the following week. Due to the COVID-19 pandemic, it was switched to a sole wide release on January 15, without a limited release, before it was delayed again to August 2021. Previous release dates also included August 14, 2020, and October 9.

The film screened at the 74th Locarno Film Festival, in the Piazza Grande section to be held from August 4 to 14.

=== Home media ===
The film was released digitally on August 27, 2021, and on Blu-ray and DVD by Universal Pictures Home Entertainment on November 9, 2021.

== Reception ==
=== Box office ===
Respect grossed $24.3 million in the United States and Canada, and $11.5 million in other territories, for a worldwide total of $35.8 million., becoming a box-office bomb.

In the United States and Canada, Respect was released alongside Free Guy and Don't Breathe 2, and was projected to gross around $10 million from 3,207 theaters in its opening weekend. The film made $3.6 million on its first day, including $650,000 from Thursday night previews. It went on to debut to $8.8 million, finishing fourth at the box office. Despite the film's targeted demographics of older, female, and African-American audiences all being among the most-reluctant to attend a theater amid the pandemic, the film's opening weekend audience was 63% female and 47% African American, with 86% being over the age of 25. The film made $3.8 million in its second weekend (a drop of 57%), finishing fifth, then made $2.2 million in its third weekend.

Outside the U.S., the film's largest opening was in Australia, grossing nearly $1 million in its first weekend. It finished third in the U.K. with $500,000, and debuted to $450,000 in France.

=== Critical response ===
On Rotten Tomatoes, the film holds an approval rating of 68% based on 191 reviews, with an average rating of 6.3/10. The website's critics consensus reads: "This standard-issue biopic falls shy of its subject's transcendent brilliance, but Jennifer Hudson's starring performance absolutely commands Respect." On Metacritic, the film has an aggregate score of 61 out of 100 based on 43 critics, indicating "generally favorable reviews". Audiences polled by CinemaScore gave the film an average grade of "A" on an A+ to F scale, while PostTrak reported filmgoers gave it an 89% positive score.

In a positive review from The New York Times, Manohla Dargis stated that the film "finds its own groove" and praised the performances of Mary J. Blige and Jennifer Hudson." Odie Henderson of RogerEbert.com gave the film a score of 3 out of 4 stars, writing that "Hudson performs with the same tireless intensity Re was known for throughout her career. It's a damn entertaining movie." Henderson also said: "There's a fair amount of ugliness in Franklin's story—sexual assault, domestic abuse, alcoholism—and it's to the film's credit that it resists the temptation to treat these issues salaciously. But Respect never goes deeper than a surface-level exploration of how these traumas affected Franklin."

Writing for Variety, Peter Debruge called the film an "overly respectful biopic [that] steers clear of revealing the traumas that shaped the soul legend" and said: "Though Respect can feel a little soft in the drama department, it delivers the added pleasure of hearing Hudson re-create Franklin's key songs, from the early jazz standards she covered for Columbia to her reinvention of the Otis Redding single that lends the film its name." Also writing for Variety, Cassie Da Costa praised Hudson's portrayal of Franklin, saying: "Bringing an incredible mix of gestural subtlety and musical power, it cannot be said enough what Hudson achieves here by transmitting a rich sense of interiority, staying true to who Franklin was in private with every look given, word spoken, and melisma sung."

Pete Hammond of Deadline also praised Hudson's performance, saying; "This is Jennifer Hudson's triumph merged with the spirit and guidance from an even greater voice above. Hudson's performance is an electrifying sight to behold." Sasha Stone from Awards Daily, praised the film and especially Hudson's performance, saying: "Hudson's performance is partly her incredible voice. She suspends time in reverie whenever she sings. But this performance also establishes her as an actress capable of navigating the ever-changing waters of Franklin's complicated life—from a young wife who doesn't quite understand exactly what kind of gift she actually has, through to finding a way to honor her own creative spirit." Writing for Time, Stephanie Zacharek called Respect "both entertaining and emotionally revelatory" and praised the performances of the cast, especially Hudson's, saying: "It's Hudson's job to play the adult version of that girl, and she shoulders it with something like tenderness. The easy thing, when you're playing a strong, potent character, is to bite down; Hudson never does. This is a terrific performance, underplayed in all the right ways, an emotionally detailed portrait of a woman who knew what she wanted and knew she could deliver—but who also moved through life knowing that she'd been cruelly robbed of that thing we so sentimentally call childhood."

Filmmaker Allison Anders praised the film, and Tommy's direction in particular, by saying: "When we love music as much as I do, and clearly as much as Liesl Tommy does, you have to be careful not to stop the story or the character's journey for a musical number. And from beginning to end, the music is driving these characters and this powerful story of a woman finding her voice and self-respect. And what a voice. And I'm not just talking about Aretha. Thank you, Liesl Tommy, for yours."

== Accolades ==
Year	Award organization	Category	Recipient	Result	Ref.
2021	African-American Film Critics Association	Top 10 Films	Respect	3rd place	
2021	African-American Film Critics Association	Best Actress	Jennifer Hudson	Won	
2021	Black Film Critics Circle	Top 10 Films	Respect	5th place	
2021	Black Film Critics Circle	Best Actress	Jennifer Hudson	Runner-up	
2021	4th Celebration of Black Cinema and Television	Actress – Film	Jennifer Hudson	Won	
2021	Detroit Film Critics Society	Best Actress	Jennifer Hudson	Nominated	
2021	12th Hollywood Music in Media Awards	Best Original Song in a Feature Film	"Here I Am (Singing My Way Home)" (Note: Jamie Hartman, Jennifer Hudson, Carole King)	Nominated	
2021	12th Hollywood Music in Media Awards	Best Original Song – Onscreen Performance	Jennifer Hudson, Hailey Kilgore & Saycon Sengbloh – "Respect"	Nominated	
2021	47th People's Choice Awards	The Drama Movie of 2021	Harvey Mason Jr., Scott Bernstein, Jonathan Glickman, Stacey Sher, Jennifer Hudson	Nominated	
2021	47th People's Choice Awards	The Female Movie Star of 2021	Jennifer Hudson	Nominated	
2021	47th People's Choice Awards	The Drama Movie Star of 2021	Jennifer Hudson	Nominated	
2021	23rd Women's Image Awards	Best Feature Film	Harvey Mason Jr., Scott Bernstein, Jonathan Glickman, Stacey Sher	Nominated	
2021	23rd Women's Image Awards	Best Actress	Jennifer Hudson	Nominated	
2022	11th AACTA International Awards	Best Actress	Jennifer Hudson	Nominated	
2022	22nd Black Reel Awards	Outstanding Actress	Jennifer Hudson	Nominated	
2022	22nd Black Reel Awards	Outstanding Original Song	"Here I Am (Singing My Way Home)"	Nominated	
2022	22nd Black Reel Awards	Outstanding Original Score	Kris Bowers	Nominated	
2022	22nd Black Reel Awards	Outstanding Editing	Avril Beukes	Nominated	
2022	79th Golden Globe Awards	Best Original Song	"Here I Am (Singing My Way Home)"	Nominated	
2022	64th Annual Grammy Awards	Best Compilation Soundtrack for Visual Media	Respect	Nominated	
2022	64th Annual Grammy Awards	Best Song Written for Visual Media	"Here I Am (Singing My Way Home)"	Nominated	
2022	53rd NAACP Image Awards	Outstanding Motion Picture	Harvey Mason Jr., Scott Bernstein, Jonathan Glickman, Stacey Sher, Jennifer Hudson	Nominated	
2022	53rd NAACP Image Awards	Entertainer of the Year	Jennifer Hudson	Won	
2022	53rd NAACP Image Awards	Outstanding Actress in a Motion Picture	Jennifer Hudson	Won	
2022	53rd NAACP Image Awards	Outstanding Supporting Actress in a Motion Picture	Audra McDonald	Nominated	
2022	53rd NAACP Image Awards	Outstanding Ensemble Cast in a Motion Picture	Respect	Nominated	
2022	53rd NAACP Image Awards	Outstanding Breakthrough Creative (Motion Picture)	Liesl Tommy	Nominated	
2022	53rd NAACP Image Awards	Outstanding Soundtrack/Compilation Album	Stephen Bray, Jason Michael Webb	Nominated	
2022	Palm Springs International Film Festival	Chairman's Award	Jennifer Hudson	Won	
2022	26th Satellite Awards	Best Motion Picture – Comedy or Musical	Harvey Mason Jr., Scott Bernstein, Jonathan Glickman, Stacey Sher	Nominated	
2022	26th Satellite Awards	Best Original Song	"Here I Am (Singing My Way Home)"	Nominated	
2022	26th Satellite Awards	Best Actress in a Motion Picture – Comedy or Musical	Jennifer Hudson	Nominated	
2022	28th Screen Actors Guild Awards	Outstanding Performance by a Female Actor in a Leading Role	Jennifer Hudson	Nominated	
2022	Society of Composers & Lyricists Awards	Outstanding Original Song for a Musical or Comedy Visual Production	"Here I Am (Singing My Way Home)"	Nominated	
