= Gotta Find Me a Lover (24 Hours a Day) =

Single by Erma Franklin
- B-side: "Change My Thoughts From You"
- Released: 1969
- Genre: R&B
- Length: 2:14
- Label: Brunswick
- Songwriter(s): Carl Davis, Eugene Record

Erma Franklin singles chronology
"Right to Cry" (1968)	"Gotta Find Me a Lover (24 Hours a Day)" (1969)	"Saving My Love" (1969)

"Gotta Find Me a Lover (24 Hours a Day)" is a song released in August of 1969 that became a hit on Billboard's R&B chart, reaching #40, for Erma Franklin. It was written by Carl Davis and Eugene Record. The song was Franklin's last R&B hit. It was Brunswick # 55403.

The first version of the song was released as an instrumental in June of 1969 by the soul and jazz ensemble Young-Holt Unlimited. Many years later, blues singer Angela Strehli covered the song on her 1993 album Blonde and Blue.

== Charts ==
Chart (1969)	Peak position
UK R&B (Record Mirror)	20
US Hot R&B/Hip-Hop Songs (Billboard)	40
