= How Glory Goes =

Studio album by Audra McDonald
- Released: (United States) February 29, 2000 (United Kingdom) May 15, 2000
- Genre: Show tunes
- Label: Nonesuch

Audra McDonald chronology
Way Back to Paradise (1998)	How Glory Goes (2000)	Happy Songs (2002)

Professional ratings
Review scores
Source	Rating
Allmusic	4/5 stars
Playbill	Positive

How Glory Goes is the second album from Audra McDonald, released in 2000. Unlike her debut album Way Back to Paradise, which featured songs from younger composers, this album contains a mixture of new and old songs, mostly from musical theatre. Five of the songs were written by Harold Arlen, and two by Adam Guettel, including the title track.

== Track listing ==
Source: Playbill.com

1. "Any Place I Hang My Hat is Home" (Arlen/Mercer, from St. Louis Woman 1946)
2. "Bill" (Kern/Wodehouse/Hammerstein, from Show Boat 1927)
3. "I Had Myself a True Love" (Arlen/Mercer, from St. Louis Woman 1946)
4. "I Hid My Love" (Marzullo/Clare, music written in 1998)
5. "Was That You?" (Guettel/Robbins, written in 1992)
6. "I Won't Mind" (Blumenkrantz/Kessler/Saines, written for The Other Franklin in 1998)
7. "A Sleepin' Bee" (Arlen/Capote, from House of Flowers 1954)
8. "Come Down from the Tree" (Flaherty/Ahrens, written for Once on This Island 1990)
9. "I Never Has Seen Snow" (Arlen/Capote, from House of Flowers 1954)
10. "When Did I Fall In Love?" (Bock/Harnick, from Fiorello! 1959)
11. "The Man That Got Away" (Arlen/Gershwin, from A Star Is Born 1954)
12. "Somewhere" (Bernstein/Sondheim, from West Side Story 1957)
13. "How Glory Goes" (Guettel, from Floyd Collins 1996)
14. "Lay Down Your Head" (Tesori/Crawley, from Violet 1997)
