= If You Want Me =

Studio album by Carolyn Franklin
- Released: 1976
- Studio: RCA Studios; New York City, New York
- Genre: Gospel, R&B
- Length: 34:15
- Label: RCA
- Producer: Jimmy Radcliffe

Carolyn Franklin chronology
I'd Rather Be Lonely (1973)	If You Want Me (1976)

If You Want Me is the final solo studio album recorded by R&B and Gospel singer Carolyn Franklin (sister of Aretha Franklin) for RCA Records, in 1976. Reissued on CD by Big Break Records in 2014.

Record Collector noted about the album, stating it "showcases a different Carolyn, her vocal delivery softer and further removed from the more immediately striking style favoured by Aretha and apparent on Carolyn’s debut Baby Dynamite!."

== Track listing ==
=== Side One ===
1. "From the Bottom of My Heart (To the Bottom of Yours)" (Carolyn Franklin, Pearl Jones) - 2:28
2. "If You Want Me" (Carolyn Franklin, Jimmy Radcliffe) - 2:53
3. "I Can't Help Myself Feeling So Blue" (Jillean Williams, Wade Marcus) - 5:35
4. "Too Many Roads" (Carolyn Franklin, Sonny Sanders) - 3:00
5. "Sunshine Holiday" (Pearl Jones, Sonny Sanders) - 2:08
6. "Dead Man" (Carolyn Franklin, Val Benson, Wade Marcus) - 2:53

=== Side Two ===
1. "You Are Everything" (Thom Bell, Linda Creed) - 2:39
2. "You Can Have My Soul" (Pearl Jones, Sonny Sanders) - 3:54
3. "Soul Man" (Ernie Cate, Earl Cate, Wade Marcus) - 2:59
4. "Not Enough to Hold" (Carolyn Franklin, Sonny Sanders) - 3:00
5. "Deal with It" (Carolyn Franklin, Pearl Jones) - 3:20

== Personnel ==
- Carolyn Franklin - vocals
- Jimmy Radcliffe - producer, arranger, conductor
- Wade Marcus - arranger, conductor
- Sonny Sanders - arranger, conductor
- Ivy Jo Hunter - assistant producer
- Paul Goodman - recording engineer
- David H. Hecht, Nick Sangiamo - photography
