= C. L. Franklin =

American Baptist minister and civil rights activist (1915–1984)

The Reverend C. L. Franklin
- Franklin in 1975
- Born: Clarence LaVaughn Walker; January 22, 1915; Bolivar County, Mississippi, U.S.
- Died: July 27, 1984 (aged 69); Detroit, Michigan, U.S.
- Cause of death: Complications of gunshot wounds
- Burial place: Woodlawn Cemetery, Detroit
- Education: Jackson College (now Jackson State University)
- Occupations: Minister; Civil rights activist
- Years active: 1931–1979
- Known for: New Bethel Baptist Church minister, father of Aretha Franklin
- Spouses: Alene Gaines (m. 1934; div. 1936) Barbara Siggers (m. 1936; died 1952)
- Children: 6, including Erma, Aretha & Carolyn

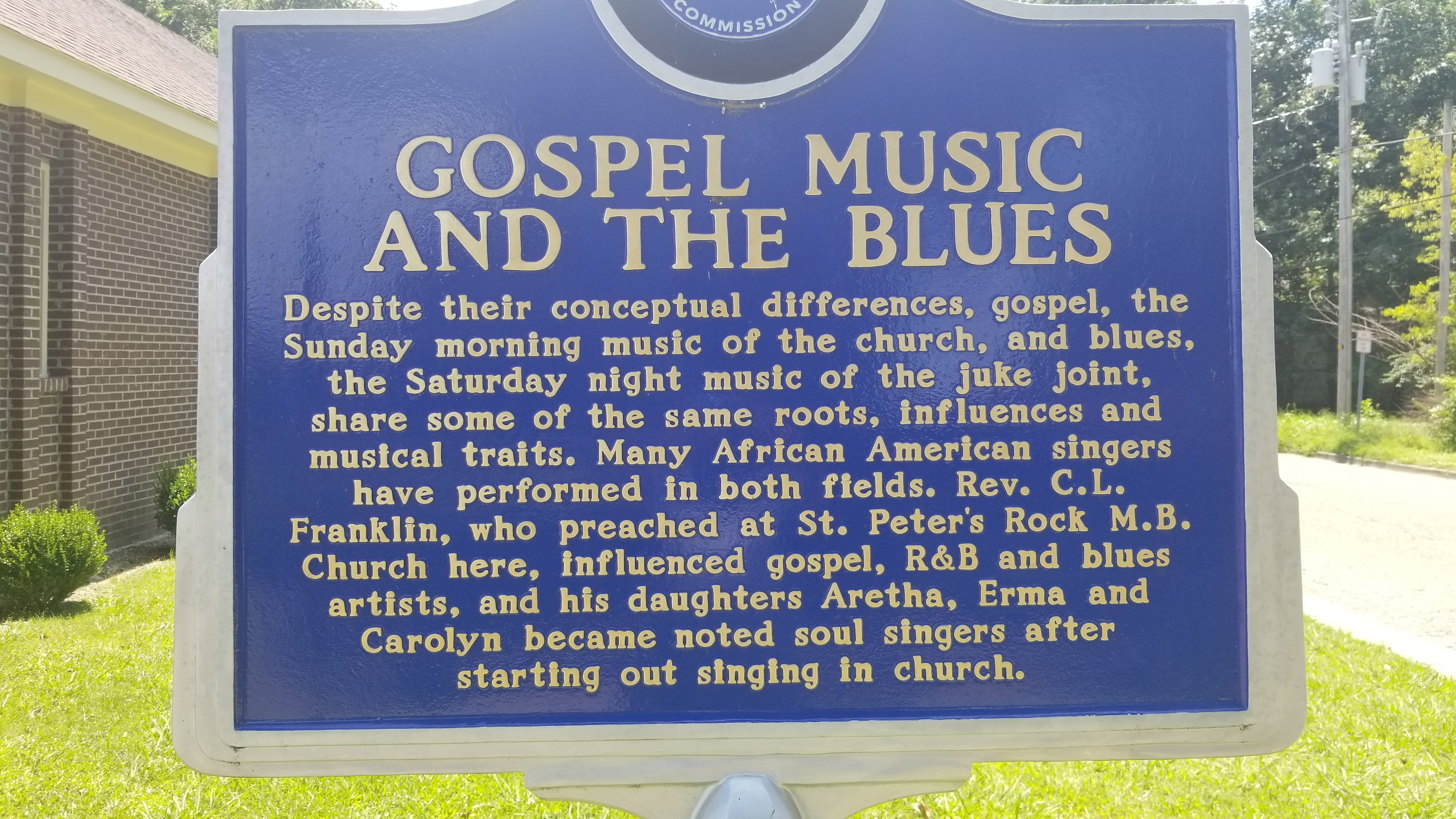
Gospel Music and the Blues

Clarence LaVaughn Franklin (né Walker; January 22, 1915 – July 27, 1984) was an American Baptist minister and civil rights activist. Known as the man with the "Million-Dollar Voice", Franklin served as the pastor of New Bethel Baptist Church in Detroit from 1946 until 1979, when in a suspected robbery attempt he was shot twice and spent his remaining five years in a coma. Franklin was the father of the American singer and songwriter Aretha Franklin. He was also the father of five other children: Vaughn Franklin, Erma Franklin, Cecil Franklin, Carolyn Franklin and Carol Ellan.

== Life ==
Franklin was born Clarence LaVaughn Walker in Bolivar County, Mississippi, United States, to sharecroppers Willie and Rachel (née Pittman) Walker (1897–1988). C. L. Franklin would recall that the only thing his father did for him was to teach him to salute when he returned from service in World War I in 1919. Willie Walker abandoned the family when Clarence was four years old. The next year, Rachel married Henry Franklin, whose surname the family adopted.

Franklin became a preacher at age 16, initially working the black itinerant preaching circuit before settling at New Salem Baptist Church in Memphis, Tennessee, where he remained until May 1944. From there he moved to the pulpit of the Friendship-West Baptist Church in Buffalo, New York, where he served until June 1946 when he became pastor of the New Bethel Baptist Church in Detroit. Throughout the late 1940s and 1950s his fame grew. He preached throughout the country, while maintaining his pulpit at New Bethel. Known as the man with the "Million Dollar Voice", Franklin had many of his sermons recorded into the 1970s (many of them issued by Joe Von Battle's JVB label), and broadcast sermons via radio on Sundays. He commanded up to $4,000 per appearance for his public appearances, high fees for the time.

Among Franklin's most famous sermons were "The Eagle Stirreth Her Nest" and "Dry Bones in the Valley". In 2011, "The Eagle Stirreth Her Nest" was added to the National Recording Registry of the Library of Congress. Selected sermons and his life history in his own words are published in a volume edited by Jeff Todd Titon for the University of Illinois Press. Franklin was also known for his singing voice and for mastery of a style of musical preaching traditional in the Black Baptist church called "whooping". In an attempt to limit his audience and popularity, William Branham plagiarized Franklin's famous "The Eagle Stirreth Her Nest" sermon, presenting to white audiences as a composition of his own.

Franklin also encouraged his daughter Aretha Franklin in her musical endeavors. During the 1950s he took her with him on speaking tours and musical engagements, and formed an a cappella group with Anthony Alexander Chamblee, his first cousin.

In the 1950s and 1960s, Franklin became involved in the civil rights movement, and worked to end discriminatory practices against black United Auto Workers members in Detroit. Franklin was a friend and supporter of Martin Luther King Jr. He helped to lead Dr. King's freedom march down Woodward Avenue in Detroit in June 1963.

== Assault, death and legacy ==
Shortly after midnight on Sunday, June 10, 1979, Franklin was shot twice at point-blank range during what was believed to have been an attempted robbery at his home on Detroit's West Side. He was taken to Henry Ford Hospital on nearby West Grand Boulevard. He remained in a coma for the next five years.

The Franklin children moved him back to his house six months after the shooting; he received 24-hour nursing care and remained at home until the middle of 1984. He died on July 27, 1984, aged 69, in Detroit's New Light Nursing Home. Franklin was entombed at Detroit's Woodlawn Cemetery on North Woodward Avenue. Franklin's friend, the Rev. Jasper Williams Jr., of the Salem Bible Church of Atlanta, Georgia, gave the eulogy. Rev. Williams also eulogized Rev. Franklin's daughter, Aretha, in 2018.

In 2021, he was portrayed by Forest Whitaker in Respect. He was portrayed by Courtney B. Vance in the anthology series Genius.

In September 2026, it was announced that Franklin would be posthumously inducted into the National Rhythm and Blues Hall of Fame along with his daughter, Erma, and six other Detroit-based legends the following October. Franklin's famed daughter Aretha is a two-time inductee.

== Personal life ==
On October 16, 1934, Franklin married his first wife, Alene Gaines, at the age of 19 and though that marriage had ended by early 1936, the form of dissolution is unconfirmed. On June 3, 1936, Franklin married gospel singer Barbara Siggers, with whom he had four children: Erma (1938–2002), Cecil (1940–1989), Aretha (1942–2018), and Carolyn (1944–1988). As noted by his biographer, Nick Salvatore, Franklin fathered a daughter, Carol Ellan Kelley (née Franklin) (1940–2019), by Mildred Jennings, a 12-year-old member of his congregation. Carol Ellan was born November 17, 1940, during Franklin's tenure at New Salem Baptist Church in Memphis, Tennessee, and was the last of his children to survive him.

Barbara had a son by a previous relationship, Vaughn (1934–2002), whom C. L. adopted shortly after the marriage. Vaughn did not learn that C. L. Franklin was not his biological father until 1951. When C. L. and Barbara separated (for the last time), Barbara moved with Vaughn to Buffalo, New York, leaving Franklin with the couple's four other children. The couple never divorced. According to biographer Nick Salvatore of Cornell University, Barbara made periodic trips to Detroit to visit her children and they traveled to New York to visit her during summer vacations. Barbara died of a heart attack in 1952 at age 34. Her husband did not attend her funeral.
