= Carolyn Franklin =

American singer-songwriter (1944–1988)

- Franklin photographed for Atlantic Records, December 1967
- Born: Carolyn Ann Franklin; May 13, 1944; Memphis, Tennessee, U.S.
- Died: April 25, 1988 (aged 43); Bloomfield, Michigan, U.S.
- Occupation: Singer–songwriter
- Years active: 1961–1987
- Relatives: Aretha Franklin (sister); Erma Franklin (sister); Barbara Siggers Franklin (mother); C. L. Franklin (father)

Carolyn Ann Franklin (May 13, 1944 – April 25, 1988) was an American singer-songwriter.

== Biography ==
Franklin was born in Memphis, Tennessee, to Barbara Siggers Franklin and C. L. Franklin. The youngest of six children, they moved to Buffalo, New York, shortly after her birth. Around 1946, the Franklin family settled in Detroit, where Carolyn began singing at her father's New Bethel Baptist Church.

Her sisters, Erma and Aretha, found success in secular music careers in the early 1960s; she followed them into the field, first recording in 1963. Carolyn began recording for RCA Records in 1969 and remained with the label until retiring from the music industry in 1976. Erma's and Carolyn's successes in the industry did not match Aretha's after her breakthrough in the late 1960s; struggling to release a hit, Carolyn began to work behind the scenes as a songwriter, mainly for Aretha's work. The two collaborated several times, and Carolyn Franklin wrote several compositions that became hits, including "Ain't No Way", recorded in 1968. The song hit the R&B Top 10 and also reached the top 20 on the Billboard Hot 100.

Carolyn's next hit for Aretha was the 1973 ballad "Angel". The song features Carolyn and Erma's voices in the background and Aretha credits Carolyn in the monologue at the beginning of the song. Carolyn also wrote 1970's "Pullin'" with Jimmy Radcliffe and Aretha, as well as "As Long As You Are There" for the album You.

Carolyn Franklin retired from the music industry in 1976, though she occasionally continued to sing with Aretha. Carolyn appeared as one of Aretha's background singers in the 1980 movie The Blues Brothers, and was a backing vocalist on Paul King's 1987 album Joy.

Carolyn Franklin died of metastatic breast cancer at Aretha Franklin's home in Bloomfield Hills, Michigan, on April 25, 1988, and is interred at Detroit's Woodlawn Cemetery with the rest of her family members.

== Discography ==
- Baby Dynamite – 1969
- Chain Reaction – 1970
- The First Time I Cried – 1970
- I'd Rather Be Lonely – 1973
- If You Want Me – 1976
- Sister Soul: The Best Of The RCA Years 1969–1976 – 2006
