= Barbara Siggers Franklin =

American singer and mother of Aretha Franklin (1917-1952)

- Born: Barbara Vernice Siggers; June 29, 1917; Shelby, Mississippi, U.S.
- Died: March 7, 1952 (aged 34); Buffalo, New York, U.S.
- Resting place: Forest Lawn Cemetery, Buffalo, New York
- Spouse: C. L. Franklin (m. 1936; sep. 1948)
- Children: 5, including Erma, Aretha & Carolyn

Barbara Vernice Franklin (née Siggers; June 29, 1917 – March 7, 1952) was an American gospel singer and pianist, the mother of American singer–songwriter Aretha Franklin and wife of C. L. Franklin, the African-American Baptist minister of New Bethel Baptist Church in Detroit.

== Life and career ==
She performed in church and later worked as a pianist.

Barbara Siggers married Clarence LaVaughn Franklin on June 3, 1936. The couple had four children: Erma (1938–2002), Cecil (1940–1989), Aretha (1942–2018), and Carolyn Franklin (1944–1988). Prior to the marriage, Barbara had a son, Vaughn (1934–2002) from a previous relationship, whom Rev. Franklin adopted shortly after their marriage. Barbara was a gifted pianist and, according to Mahalia Jackson, one of the finest gospel singers in the country. Though her primary role was that of wife and mother, she actively participated in the musical affairs of the churches where C. L. served as pastor.

Following marital trouble stemming from C. L.'s numerous and ongoing infidelities, including fathering a daughter (named Carol Ellan Kelley [née Jennings]) by Mildred Jennings, a 12-year-old congregant in Memphis in 1940, she left Franklin in 1948 and moved to Buffalo, New York, where her mother resided and where Franklin had served as pastor of Friendship Baptist Church from May 1944 to June 1946. She made a life for herself working in a music store, giving private music lessons, and training to be a nurse's aide. She and Franklin never officially divorced.

Although it was widely reported that she had deserted her children, Aretha Franklin disputed that claim, and Nick Salvatore of Cornell University took pains to discredit it in his biography of C. L. Franklin. According to Salvatore, she visited Detroit to see her children, and they traveled to Buffalo during summer vacations for stays with her. She died of takotsubo cardiomyopathy on March 7, 1952, at 34 years of age.

== Legacy ==
- Audra McDonald played Barbara Franklin in the 2021 Aretha biopic, Respect.
- Antonique Smith played Barbara Franklin in Genius third season for National Geographic in 2021.
