= Lady Day at Emerson's Bar and Grill =

Play about Billie Holiday

- Written by: Lanie Robertson
- Characters: Billie Holiday; Jimmy Powers; Pepi
- Original language: English

Premiere
- Date premiered: April 16, 1986
- Place premiered: Alliance Theatre, Atlanta, Georgia

Lady Day at Emerson's Bar and Grill is a play with music featuring several of Billie Holiday's most famous songs. The play was written by Lanie Robertson and recounts some events in the life of Holiday. It premiered in 1986 at the Alliance Theatre in Atlanta, Georgia, and soon played Off-Broadway. The play opened on Broadway in 2014, and also played in London's West End in 2017.

== Production history ==
Lady Day at Emerson's Bar and Grill premiered at the Alliance Theatre, Atlanta, Georgia, on April 16, 1986, with direction by Woodie King Jr. and Reenie Upchurch as Billie Holiday.

The play was next produced Off-Broadway at the Vineyard Theatre on June 5, 1986, and then opened in a Vineyard Theatre production at the Westside Theatre on September 7, 1986. This production closed on May 17, 1987 after 281 performances. Directed by Andre Ernotte, Lonette McKee starred as Holiday. In February 1987 S. Epatha Merkerson took over the role of Billie Holiday. The play won the 1987 Outer Critics Circle Award for Best Off-Broadway Book (Robertson).

The Hollywood Playhouse (in California) produced Lady Day in October 1987, directed by Andre Ernotte, and with S. Epatha Merkerson reprising her role as Holiday. Ernotte said that he wanted to "deglamorize Billie: show the dark, sad side. So it's not so much a nightclub act as a theater play with music." He also noted that Merkerson, being an actress who sang as opposed to just a singer, was able to better present the dramatic aspect of the play. The play was presented at the Long Wharf Theatre, New Haven, Connecticut in November 2005, with Ernestine Jackson as Billie Holiday.

The play opened on Broadway at Circle in the Square on April 13, 2014. Directed by Lonny Price, the production starred Audra McDonald as Billie Holiday and featured Shelton Becton as pianist Jimmy Powers. The sets are by James Noone, costumes by Esosa, lighting by Robert Wierzel and sound by Steve Canyon Kennedy. The play was originally scheduled for a limited 10-week engagement, but was extended several times until it finally closed on October 5, 2014. Audra McDonald won her record-breaking sixth Tony Award for the production, and she became the only person to win in all four acting categories, this time winning for Best Actress in a Play. The play also won for Best Sound Design of a Play.

The 2014 Broadway production was filmed at the Cafe Brasil in New Orleans and broadcast on HBO on March 12, 2016. Audra McDonald received a 2016 Emmy Award nomination for Outstanding Lead Actress in a Limited Series or Movie for her role in the broadcast.

McDonald was expected to reprise her role in the West End at the Wyndham's Theatre, from June 15 through September 3, 2016. She was to take a 3-month break from her role on Broadway in Shuffle Along, or, the Making of the Musical Sensation of 1921 and All That Followed. However, in a change announced on May 10, 2016, Lady Day was postponed because McDonald and her husband Will Swenson were expecting a baby. She said, in part: "Of course, I’m disappointed I have to postpone my West End debut in Lady Day, but I look forward to rescheduling as soon as possible.” The play was rescheduled, with McDonald making her West End debut at Wyndham’s Theatre from June 27, 2017 through September 9, 2017.

== Plot ==
The play takes place in South Philadelphia in March 1959. Billie Holiday is performing in a run-down bar, during one of her last performances before her death in July 1959 from complications of alcoholism. She sings, accompanied by Jimmy Powers on the piano, and also tells stories about her life as she becomes increasingly intoxicated and incoherent.

== Songs ==
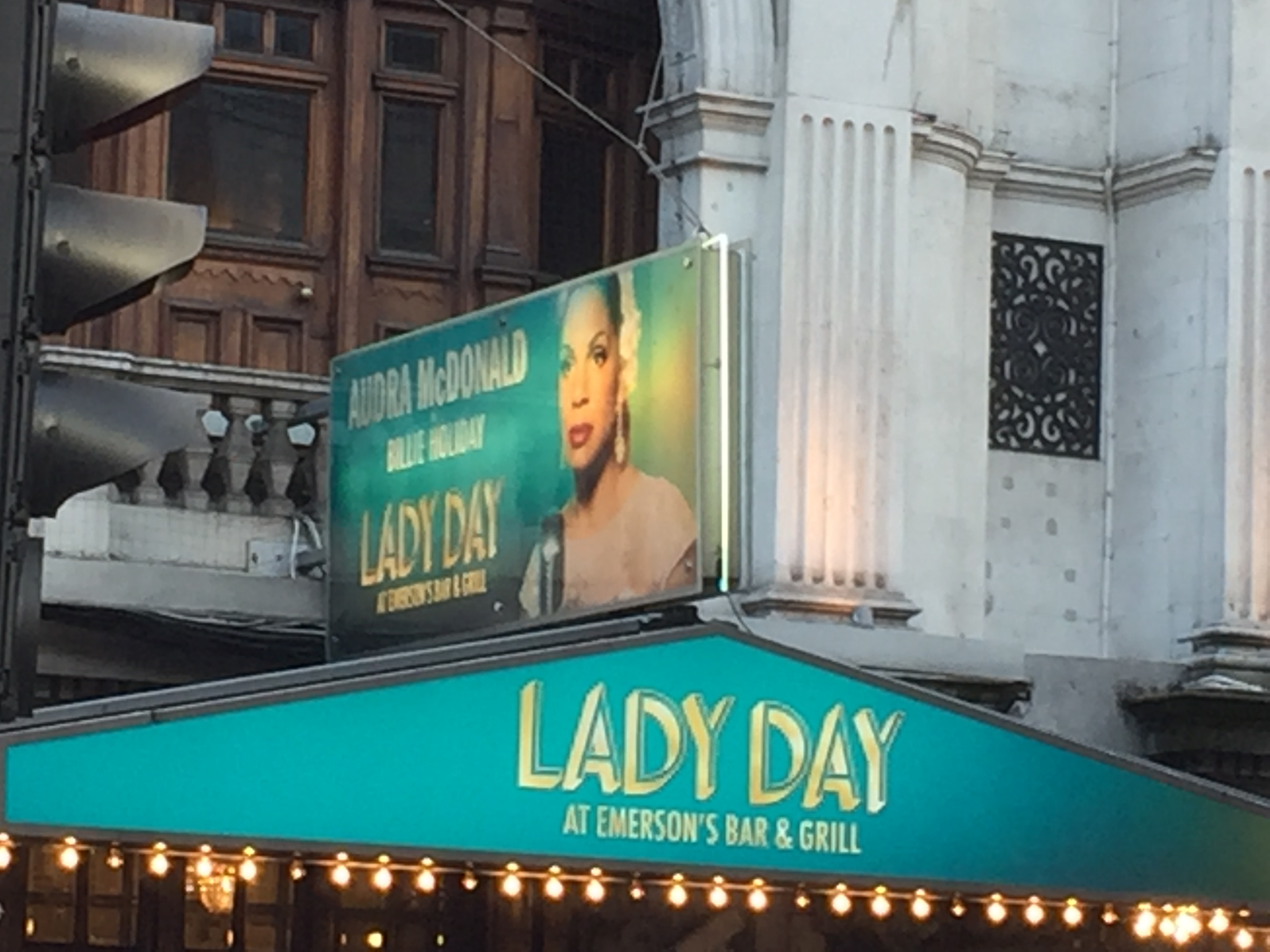
Lady Day at Emerson's Bar and Grill starring Audra McDonald at Wyndham's Theatre.

- "I Wonder Where Our Love Has Gone" (music by Buddy Johnson; lyrics by Buddy Johnson)
- "When a Woman Loves a Man" (music by Bernie Hanighen and Gordon Jenkins; lyrics by Johnny Mercer)
- "What a Little Moonlight Can Do" (music by Harry Woods; lyrics by Harry Woods)
- "Crazy He Calls Me" (music by Carl Sigman; lyrics by Bob Russell)
- "Gimme a Pigfoot (And a Bottle of Beer)", (music by Wesley Wilson; lyrics by Wesley Wilson)
- "Baby Doll"
- "God Bless the Child" (music by Billie Holiday and Arthur Herzog, Jr.; lyrics by Billie Holiday and Arthur Herzog, Jr.)
- "Foolin' Myself" (music by Jack Lawrence and Peter Tinturin; lyrics by Jack Lawrence and Peter Tinturin)
- "Somebody's on My Mind" (music by Billie Holiday and Arthur Herzog, Jr.; lyrics by Billie Holiday and Arthur Herzog, Jr.)
- "Easy Livin'" (music by Ralph Rainger and Leo Robin; lyrics by Ralph Rainger and Leo Robin)
- "Strange Fruit" (music by Abel Meeropol; lyrics by Abel Meeropol)
- Blues Break
- "T'ain't Nobody's Business If I Do" (music by Porter Grainger and Everett Robbins; lyrics by Porter Grainger and Everett Robbins)
- "Don't Explain" (music by Arthur Herzog, Jr. and Billie Holiday; lyrics by Arthur Herzog, Jr. and Billie Holiday)
- "What a Little Moonlight Can Do" (Reprise) (music by Harry Woods; lyrics by Harry Woods)
- "Deep Song" (music by George Cory and Douglass Cross; lyrics by George Cory, Douglass Cross)

== Critical reception ==
In his review of the 2005 Long Wharf production for Variety, Frank Rizzo wrote:

...two-time Tony nominee Ernestine Jackson... presents the singer as a simultaneously strong and desperate figure who finds some solace in her songs, but more in her own personal “moonlight” of drugs, booze and memories. Jackson nicely suggests rather than mimics the famous Holiday deeply lived sound in a show filled with more than a dozen tunes accompanied by an accomplished trio. But this is far from a simple songbook, and the cumulative power comes in the unraveling of an addicted artist and her story at the end of her days.

Critics praised the performance of Audra McDonald in the 2014 Broadway production while not being as enthusiastic about the writing. In his review for The New York Times, Charles Isherwood said,

it's worth putting up with the show's tackier (and duller) aspects for the pleasure of hearing Ms. McDonald breathe aching life into some of Holiday's greatest songs. She has tamped down the lush bloom of her voice to suggest the withered state of Holiday's instrument during the last years of her career, but the sound remains tangy, expressive and rich.

Marilyn Stasio in Variety called the play's script "unrealistically stuffed with just about every known biographical detail about [Holiday's] unhappy life", but praised McDonald's performance, saying

she captures the plaintive sound, the eccentric phrasing and all the little vocal catches that identify Billie Holiday's unique style. But it's her extraordinary sensitivity as an actor that makes McDonald's interpretation memorable.

== Recording ==
PS Classics recorded the cast album live during the May 27–31 performances, with the album scheduled for release on July 15, 2014.

== Awards and nominations ==
- Audra McDonald was nominated for the 2017 Screen Actors Guild Award, Screen Actors Guild Award for Outstanding Performance by a Female Actor in a Miniseries or Television Movie
- Audra McDonald was nominated for the 2016 Emmy Award, Outstanding Lead Actress in a Limited Series or Movie.
- Audra McDonald won the 2014 Drama Desk Award, Outstanding Actress in a Play.
- The play received two 2014 Outer Critics Circle Awards nominations: Outstanding Revival Of A Musical (Broadway or Off-Broadway) and Outstanding Actress In A Musical (Audra McDonald). Audra McDonald won the award.
- The play received two 2014 Tony Award nominations: Best Performance by an Actress in a Leading Role in a Play and Best Sound Design of a Play (Steve Canyon Kennedy). (The Tony Awards Administration Committee had decided that Lady Day at Emerson's Bar and Grill is eligible for the category of Best Revival of a Play, and that ruling made McDonald eligible for Best Actress in a Play.) Audra McDonald won for Best Performance by an Actress in a Leading Role in a Play and Steve Canyon Kennedy won for Best Sound Design of a Play.
