= Connie Briscoe =

American romantic fiction novelist (born 1952)

- Born: December 31, 1952 (age 73); Washington, D.C., U.S.
- Education: Hampton University, American University
- Occupation: Writer
- Writing career
- Literary movement: African-American fiction

Connie Briscoe (born December 31, 1952) is an American writer of romantic and historical fiction. Briscoe's first novel, Sisters and Lovers (1994), sold nearly 500,000 copies in cloth and paperback combined in its first two years.

Darryl Dickson-Carr has characterized Briscoe as "among the better writers to emerge in and benefit from the strong wave of interest in African-American fiction that arose in the early 1990s after the publication of Terry McMillan's Waiting to Exhale (1992)."

== Early life and education ==
Connie Briscoe was born in Washington, D.C., on December 31, 1952. She was born with a hearing impairment due to a genetic condition and became profoundly deaf by the age of thirty, though she became adept at lip-reading. Briscoe grew up in the Silver Spring, Maryland, area.

She attended Hampton University, graduating with a bachelor's degree in 1974, and American University, graduating with a Master of Public Administration degree in 1978.

== Career ==
Briscoe worked as a research analyst from 1976 to 1980, then as an associate editor for Joint Center for Political and Economic Studies from 1981 to 1990. From 1990 to 1994, she worked as the managing editor for American Annals of the Deaf, an academic journal published by Gallaudet University Press. While at Gallaudet, she learned American Sign Language and was immersed in deaf culture for the first time. Briscoe wrote her first novel, Sisters and Lovers, while working for Gallaudet; that story focuses on the dating experiences of three young black sisters. After the success of that novel, she shifted to working full-time as a writer. Her second book, Big Girls Don't Cry, was published in 1996, with a story about a young, middle-class black woman entering the business world during the 1960s and 1970s. In 1996, Newsweek columnist Malcolm Jones Jr. wrote that Briscoe was one of several authors who were writing in "a new literary genre", one focusing on upbeat stories about contemporary black women. In 2022, in USA Today she was named in an article titled100 Black novelists and fiction writers you should read, from Abi Daré to Zora Neale Hurston.

== Works ==
- Sisters and Lovers, New York: Harper Collins, 1994 ISBN 9780060171162 OCLC 28927997
- Big Girls Don't Cry, New York: Harper Collins, 1996, ISBN 9780060172770 OCLC 1002100765
- A Long Way from Home, New York: Harper Collins, 1999, ISBN 9780060172787 OCLC 40433233
- P. G. County, Doubleday, New York, 2002, ISBN 9780385501613 OCLC 49320448
- Can't get enough, New York: Doubleday, 2005, ISBN 9780385501620 OCLC 57142679
- You Only Get Better: Celebrating Life Every Step of the Way, New York: Kimani Press, 2007 ISBN 9780373830596 OCLC 85824128
- Jewels: 50 Phenomenal Black Women Over 50, New York: Little Brown and Company, 2007 ISBN 9780316075701 OCLC 669066898
- Sisters and Husbands, New York: Grand Central Publishers, 2009 ISBN 9780446534895 OCLC 244628391
- Money Can't Buy Love, New York: Grand Central Publishers, 2011, ISBN 9780446534840 OCLC 664450870
- You Never Know, New York: Harper Collins, 2023, ISBN 9780063246584 OCLC 1371414122
- Stepping Out: The Unapologetic Style of African Americans over Fifty, New York: Clarkson Potter, 2023, ISBN 978-0593236116 OCLC 1370218278
- Chloe, New York: Harper Collins, 2025, ISBN 978-0063338562 OCLC 1445430028

== Awards ==
In 2000, Briscoe was honored by Gallaudet University with the Amos Kendall Award, "presented to a deaf person in recognition of his or her notable excellence in a professional field not related to deafness". Her third book, A Long Way From Home, was nominated for the NAACP Image Awards.
