= Erma Franklin =

American gospel and soul singer (1938–2002)

- Franklin in 1967

Background information
- Born: Erma Vernice Franklin; March 13, 1938; Shelby, Mississippi, U.S.
- Died: September 7, 2002 (aged 64) Detroit, Michigan, U.S.
- Genres: Gospel; soul
- Occupation: Singer
- Years active: 1955–2002
- Labels: Epic; Brunswick; RockBeat
- Website: ermafranklin.com

Erma Vernice Franklin (March 13, 1938 – September 7, 2002) was an American gospel and soul singer. She recorded the original version of "Piece of My Heart", written and produced by Jerry Ragovoy and Bert Berns in 1967, for which she was nominated for a Grammy Award. A cover version of the same song was recorded the following year by Big Brother and the Holding Company, with lead vocals by Janis Joplin. Franklin was the elder sister of singer Aretha Franklin.

== Biography ==
=== Early life and family ===
Erma Franklin was born in Shelby, Mississippi, United States, the oldest daughter of Barbara (née Siggers) and the Reverend C. L. Franklin. She was raised in Detroit, Michigan, where her father was pastor of the New Bethel Baptist Church. She was raised by both parents until the age of 10, when her parents separated for the final time. Her mother took her eldest sibling, half-brother Vaughn, with her to Buffalo, New York, in 1948. Barbara Siggers-Franklin died on March 7, 1952, in Buffalo.

Franklin studied Business at Clark Atlanta University (then named "Clark College").

=== Career ===
During her childhood, Erma and her sisters Aretha and Carolyn sang at New Bethel Baptist Church. When Aretha became a recording artist, Erma provided backing vocals and toured with her. Erma sang backup for her sister Aretha on Aretha's signature tune "Respect".

In 1967, Erma Franklin sang the original version of "Piece of My Heart", which was a top 10 soul hit in the U.S. and rose to number 62 on the U.S. Billboard Hot 100 chart. The track was co-written and produced by Bert Berns. In the UK, Franklin's version was used in a Levi's jeans commercial ("Cinderella" AKA "Night and Day"), leading to a resurgence of interest in the song. The single was re-released in the UK in 1992 and peaked on the UK Singles Chart at number 9.

Franklin told an interviewer that when she first heard Janis Joplin's version on the radio, she did not recognize it because of the vocal arrangement.

In the mid-1970s, Franklin left the music industry, apart from occasional engagements with her sister. She was one of the special guests on Aretha's 1986 Showtime cable television special — filmed at Detroit's Music Hall — and also performed on June 28, 1990, at Nelson Mandela's rally at Tiger Stadium.

=== Personal life and death ===
Franklin married Thomas Garrett and gave birth to their two children: Thomas Jr. and Sabrina. For 25 years, Franklin worked for the Boysville Holy Cross Community Center, a Detroit organization that helps homeless and disadvantaged minority children. Franklin died of cancer in Detroit, on September 7, 2002, aged 64. She is interred at Detroit's historic Woodlawn Cemetery.

== Legacy and accolades ==
In September 2026, it was announced that Franklin would be posthumously inducted into the National Rhythm and Blues Hall of Fame along with her father, Reverend C. L. Franklin and six other Detroit-based legends the following October. Franklin's younger sister Aretha is a two-time inductee.

== Discography ==
=== Albums ===
Year	Album	Peaks	Label
Year	Album	US	Label
1962	Her Name Is Erma	—	Epic
1969	Soul Sister	199	Brunswick
2015	The Electric Flag Featuring Erma Franklin - Live 1968 (with The Electric Flag)	—	RockBeat
"—" denotes releases that did not chart or were not released in that territory.

=== Singles ===
List of singles, with selected chart positions, showing year released and album name
Title	Year	Peak chart positions									Album
Title	Year	US	US R&B /HH	BEL (FL)	DEN	IRE	NLD	SWE	UK	UK R&B	Album
"Hello Again"	1961	—	—	—	—	—	—	—	—	—	Her Name Is Erma
"What Kind of Girl"	1961	—	—	—	—	—	—	—	—	—	Her Name Is Erma
"Time After Time"	1962	—	—	—	—	—	—	—	—	—	Her Name Is Erma
"Dear Momma"	1962	—	—	—	—	—	—	—	—	—	Non-album single
"I Don't Want No Momma's Boy"	1963	—	—	—	—	—	—	—	—	—	Non-album single
"Abracadabra"	1963	—	—	—	—	—	—	—	—	—	Non-album single
"Big Boss Man"	1967	—	—	—	—	—	—	—	—	—	Non-album single
"Piece of My Heart"	1967	62	10	33	5	10	9	25	9	5	Non-album single
"Open Up Your Soul"	1968	107	—	—	—	—	—	—	—	—	Non-album single
"I'm Just Not Ready For Love"	1968	—	—	—	—	—	—	—	—	—	Non-album single
"The Right to Cry"	1968	—	—	—	—	—	—	—	—	—	Non-album single
"It Could've Been Me"	1969	—	—	—	—	—	—	—	—	—	Non-album single
"Saving My Love For You"	1969	—	—	—	—	—	—	—	—	—	Soul Sister
"Gotta Find Me a Lover (24 Hours a Day)"	1969	—	40	—	—	—	—	—	—	20	Soul Sister
"Whispers (Gettin' Louder)"	1970	—	—	—	—	—	—	—	—	—	Non-album single
"—" denotes releases that did not chart or were not released in that territory.

- "(Take a Little) Piece of My Heart" did not chart in the UK until 1992, therefore the peak recorded here occurred on 31st October 1992
