= New Bethel Baptist Church (Detroit) =

- U.S. National Register of Historic Places
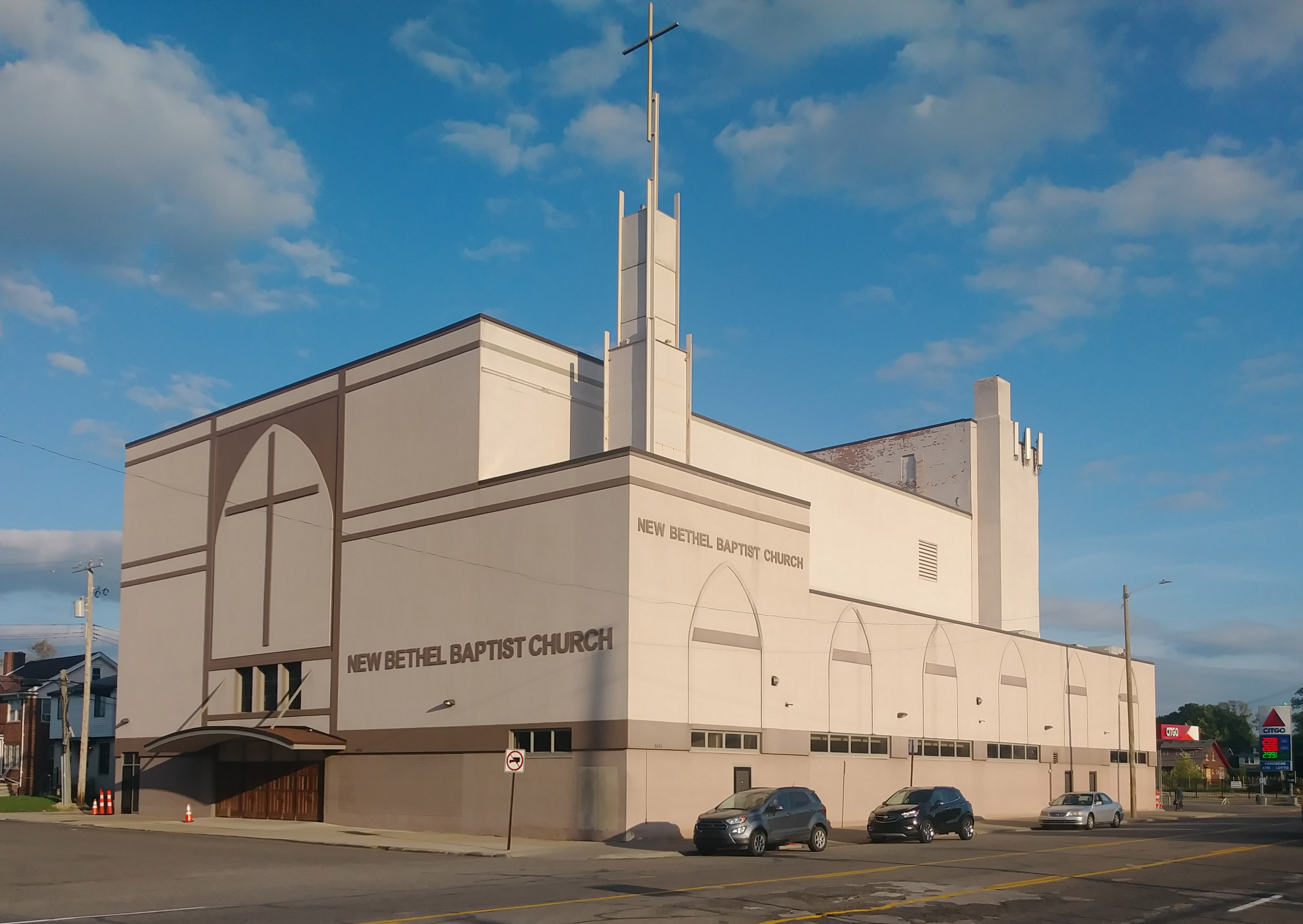
- New Bethel Baptist Church, 2019
- Interactive map
- Location: 8430 Linwood St. (C. L. Franklin Blvd.); Detroit, Michigan
- Coordinates: 42°22′5″N 83°6′17″W
- Website: newbetheldetroit.org
- MPS: The Civil Rights Movement and the African American Experience in 20th Century Detroit MPS
- NRHP reference No.: 100006130
- Added to NRHP: February 8, 2021

New Bethel Baptist Church is a Baptist church located at 8430 C. L. Franklin Boulevard (also called Linwood Street) in Detroit, Michigan. It is affiliated with the National Baptist Convention, USA. Founded in 1932, the church was led by C. L. Franklin from 1946 until 1979 and was at the center of the civil rights movement in Detroit. Robert Smith Jr. has been the pastor since 1982. The building was listed on the National Register of Historic Places in 2021.

== History ==
The church was founded March 6, 1932. V. L. Bolton was the first pastor and was followed by Horatius "H.H." Coleman (1932–1935), N. H. Armstrong (1935–1940) and William E. Ramsey (1940–1946).

=== C. L. Franklin years ===
==== Growth of the congregation ====
In May 1946, C. L. Franklin became the pastor. When Franklin became pastor, the congregation had 400 members and met in a bowling alley at Willis and Hastings. In October 1951, the church moved into a new church, built at a cost of $250,000 with a seating capacity of 2,500, at 4210 Hastings Street in Detroit.

In the 1950s, New Bethel became known for its gospel choir which had weekly radio broadcasts. Participants included Franklin, music director Thomas Shelby, and Franklin's daughter Aretha Franklin. James Cleveland served as organist and sometimes conductor in the early 1950s. In 1956, a 14-year-old Aretha Franklin made her first recordings for J-V-B Records at New Bethel.

In 1961, the church lost its Hastings Street building to construction of the Chrysler Freeway. The church, which had 4,000 members at the time, moved to the Gold Coast Theater (8210 Twelfth) for the next two years.

==== Move to Oriole Theater building ====
On March 10, 1963, the church moved to the previously dilapidated Oriole Theater at the corner of Linwood and Philadelphia in Detroit. Detroit architect Nathan Johnson oversaw the remodeling which cost more than $500,000. The project was Detroit's "first major all-Negro building project", using an architect, contractors, and financing from the African-American community. The Detroit Free Press described the new structure as follows: "The row of glass doors at the entrance and the vast expanse of whiteness inside gives one the feeling of entering a miniature Cobo Hall." More than 2,000 persons participated in a procession of cars from the temporary home at the Gold Coast Theater to the new site. At the time, Franklin described the trip as a "trip from the valley to the mountain."

==== Civil rights movement ====
During the 1960s, New Bethel under Franklin became a center of the civil rights movement in Detroit. Events occurring at New Bethel included:

- In May 1963, Franklin was elected chairman of the Detroit Council of Human Rights and petitioned Detroit's Common Council for permission to conduct a march that became known as the Detroit Walk to Freedom. The group also adopted the "Declaration of Detroit" noting that 30% of Detroit's population was African-American, yet 70% of the city's African-Americans lived in substandard housing. The Detroit Walk to Freedom, planned by Franklin and members of New Bethel, took place on June 23, 1963. The protest had 125,000 persons, was the largest civil rights demonstration in the country's history to that point, and culminated in a speech by Martin Luther King Jr. at Cobo Hall.
- In February 1965, a rally was held at New Bethel to raise funds for Dr. King's voter registration drive in Selma, Alabama.
- In November 1965, Coretta Scott King delivered the key note address at the annual Women's Day services at New Bethel.
- In October 1966, Martin Luther King Jr. delivered a speech at the annual men's day dinner at New Bethel.
- In November 1966, James Meredith, five months after being shot during his March Against Fear in Mississippi, spoke at a rally at New Bethel.
- In April 1969, a memorial for Dr. King was held at New Bethel on the first anniversary of his assassination.

==== Police shootout ====
On March 29, 1969, the church was rented by the Republic of New Africa as the site of a black separatist convention. A shootout between police and members of the movement resulted in the death of a police officer. Police raided the church and arrested 150 persons in attendance. A juvenile, Imari Obadele 2, aka Richard B. Henry Jr., was among the 150 persons in attendance son and nephew of Imari Obadele and Gaidi Obadele, was in fact the last person to be released some days later. A controversy followed after the attendees were held and questioned without counsel. During the incident, police fired into the church, causing extensive damage, and resulting in the need for financing to repair the "bullet-scarred" building.

In May 1969, as the controversy over the police raid and shooting continued, Franklin was arrested by Detroit police who claimed that they found marijuana in his luggage; Franklin denied the charge, wondered if the incident was connected to the church shooting, and asserted, "Somebody wants to disgrace me." Police had held the luggage for 24 hours, and Franklin claimed he had never in his life smoked marijuana. The charge was dismissed one month later for insufficient evidence.

==== 1970s and Franklin's shooting ====
In January 1974, two gunshots were fired into the church during a service conducted by Franklin. Two attendees were injured.

In June 1979, Franklin was shot twice by burglars at his home in Detroit. Franklin remained in a coma until his death from heart failure on July 27, 1984. His funeral, held at New Bethel, was reported to be the largest in Detroit history, and featured Jesse Jackson as a speaker. In June 2016, the portion of Linwood Street adjacent to the church was renamed Rev. Dr. C. L. Franklin Boulevard.

== Notable funerals and weddings ==
Since the 1960s, New Bethel has been the site of funerals and memorial services for many notable Detroit residents, including the following:

- Singer Dinah Washington in December 1963,
- Civil rights activist and UAW vice president Nelson "Jack" Edwards in November 1974,
- Florence Ballard of The Supremes in February 1976,
- Philippé Wynne, lead singer of The Spinners, in July 1984,
- C. L. Franklin, longtime pastor of New Bethel and Civil Rights activist, father of Aretha Franklin, in August 1984, and
- David Ruffin, lead singer of The Temptations, in June 1991.

Aretha Franklin was also married to Glynn Turman there in April 1978 in a ceremony featuring singing by The Four Tops.

== Later years ==
After Franklin's shooting in 1979, the church suffered from a power struggle for more than two years. In June 1982, Robert Smith Jr. became the new pastor. Smith remains as the church's pastor as of 2020.

In 1987, Aretha Franklin recorded the album, One Lord, One Faith, One Baptism, at the church, releasing the album on the Arista label. The album was re-released in 2003 with previously unreleased songs.

== Beliefs ==
The Church has a Baptist confession of faith and is a member of the National Baptist Convention, USA.
