= List of awards and nominations received by Aretha Franklin =

Aretha Franklin awards and nominations
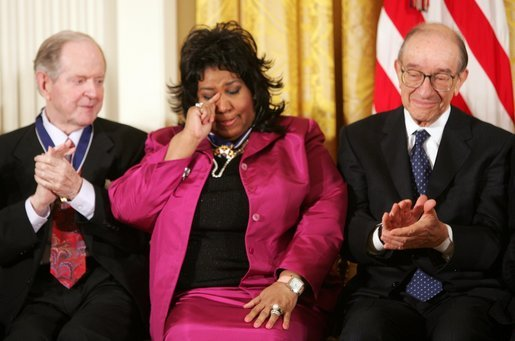
- Franklin at the White House after being honored with the Presidential Medal of Freedom, November 9, 2005 (alongside Robert Conquest, left, and Alan Greenspan)
Awards and nominations
Award	Wins	Nominations
Golden Globe Award	0	1
American Music Award	5	11
Critics' Choice Movie Award	0	1
Grammy Awards	18	44
Grammy Special awards	3	N/A
MTV Video Music Award	0	2
NAACP Image Award	2	2
TV Land Award	1	1

Totals (Note: Certain award groups do not simply award one winner. They acknowledge several different recipients, have runners-up, and have third place. Since this is a specific recognition and is different from losing an award, runner-up mentions are considered wins in this award tally. For simplification and to avoid errors, each award in this list has been presumed to have had a prior nomination.)
- Wins: 28
- Nominations: 32

Singer Aretha Franklin has been honored with many awards and nominations. These include 18 Grammy Awards and an additional 26 Grammy nominations for her recordings.

== Grammy Awards ==
Franklin was nominated for a Grammy Award 44 times and was the award winner 18 times. Eleven of her albums were nominated, winning four times.

Year	Category	Nominated work	Result	Ref.
1968	Best Rhythm & Blues Solo Vocal Performance, Female	"Respect"	Won	
1968	Best Rhythm & Blues Recording	"Respect"	Won	
1968	Best Vocal Performance, Female	"Respect"	Nominated	
1968	Best Contemporary Female Solo Vocal Performance	"(You Make Me Feel Like) A Natural Woman"	Nominated	
1969	Best Contemporary-Pop Vocal Performance, Female	"I Say a Little Prayer"	Nominated	
1969	Best Rhythm & Blues Vocal Performance, Female	"Chain of Fools"	Won	
1970	Best R&B Vocal Performance, Female	"Share Your Love with Me"	Won	
1971	Best R&B Vocal Performance, Female	"Don't Play That Song"	Won	
1972	Best R&B Vocal Performance, Female	"Bridge over Troubled Water"	Won	
1973	Best R&B Vocal Performance, Female	Young, Gifted and Black	Won	
1973	Best Soul Gospel Performance	Amazing Grace	Won	
1973	Best Soul Gospel Performance	"Precious Memories"	Nominated	
1973	Best Pop Vocal Performance, Female	"Day Dreaming"	Nominated	
1974	Best R&B Vocal Performance, Female	"Master of Eyes"	Won	
1975	Best R&B Vocal Performance, Female	"Ain't Nothing like the Real Thing"	Won	
1977	Best R&B Vocal Performance, Female	"Something He Can Feel"	Nominated	
1978	Best R&B Vocal Performance, Female	"Break It to Me Gently"	Nominated	
1979	Best R&B Vocal Performance, Female	Almighty Fire	Nominated	
1981	Best R&B Vocal Performance, Female	"Can't Turn You Loose"	Nominated	
1982	Best R&B Vocal Performance, Female	"Hold On I'm Comin'"	Won	
1983	Best R&B Vocal Performance, Female	Jump to It	Nominated	
1984	Best R&B Vocal Performance, Female	Get It Right	Nominated	
1986	Best R&B Vocal Performance, Female	"Freeway of Love"	Won	
1986	Best R&B Performance by a Duo or Group with Vocal	"Sisters Are Doin' It for Themselves"(with Eurythmics)	Nominated	
1987	Best R&B Vocal Performance, Female	"Jumpin' Jack Flash"	Nominated	
1988	Best R&B Vocal Performance, Female	Aretha	Won	
1988	Best R&B Performance by a Duo or Group with Vocal	"I Knew You Were Waiting (For Me)" (with George Michael)	Won	
1989	Best Soul Gospel Performance, Female	One Lord, One Faith, One Baptism	Won	
1989	Best Soul Gospel Performance by a Duo, Group, Choir or Chorus	"Oh Happy Day"	Nominated	
1990	Best R&B Vocal Performance, Female	Through the Storm	Nominated	
1990	Best R&B Performance by a Duo or Group with Vocal	"Gimme Your Love" (with James Brown)	Nominated	
1990	Best R&B Performance by a Duo or Group with Vocal	"It Isn't, It Wasn't, It Ain't Never Gonna Be" (with Whitney Houston)	Nominated	
1992	Best R&B Vocal Performance, Female	What You See Is What You Sweat	Nominated	
1992	Best R&B Performance by a Duo or Group with Vocal	"Doctor's Orders" (with Luther Vandross)	Nominated	
1994	Best R&B Vocal Performance, Female	"Someday We'll All Be Free"	Nominated	
1995	Best R&B Vocal Performance, Female	"A Deeper Love"	Nominated	
1999	Best Female R&B Vocal Performance	"A Rose Is Still a Rose"	Nominated	
1999	Best R&B Album	A Rose Is Still a Rose	Nominated	
2000	Best R&B Performance by a Duo or Group with Vocal	"Don't Waste Your Time" (with Mary J. Blige)	Nominated	
2004	Best R&B Album	So Damn Happy	Nominated	
2004	Best Traditional R&B Vocal Performance	"Wonderful"	Won	
2006	Best Traditional R&B Vocal Performance	"A House Is Not a Home"	Won	
2008	Best Gospel Performance	"Never Gonna Break My Faith" (with Mary J. Blige) (tied with The Clark Sisters for "Blessed & Highly Favored")	Won	
2011	Best R&B Performance by a Duo or Group with Vocals	"You've Got a Friend" (with Ronald Isley)	Nominated	

Grammy Special Awards

Year	Award	Result	Ref.
1991	Legend Award	Honored	
1994	Lifetime Achievement Award	Honored	
2008	MusiCares Person of the Year	Honored	

== American Music Awards ==
Year	Category	Nominated work	Result	Ref.
1974	Favorite Soul/R&B Female Artist	Herself	Nominated	
1975	Favorite Soul/R&B Female Artist	Herself	Nominated	
1976	Favorite Soul/R&B Female Artist	Herself	Won	
1977	Favorite Soul/R&B Female Artist	Herself	Nominated	
1978	Favorite Soul/R&B Female Artist	Herself	Nominated	
1983	Favorite Soul/R&B Female Artist	Herself	Nominated	
1983	Favorite Soul/R&B Album	Jump to It	Won	
1984	Favorite Soul/R&B Female Artist	Herself	Won	
1986	Favorite Soul/R&B Female Artist	Herself	Won	
1986	Favorite Soul/R&B Female Video Artist	Herself	Won	
1987	Favorite Soul/R&B Female Video Artist	Herself	Nominated	

== Critics' Choice Movie Awards ==
Year	Category	Nominated work	Result	Ref.
2007	Best Song	"Never Gonna Break My Faith"	Nominated	

== Golden Globe Awards ==
Year	Category	Nominated work	Result	Ref.
2006	Best Original Song	"Never Gonna Break My Faith"	Nominated	

== GMA Dove Awards ==
Year	Category	Work	Result
1988	Traditional Black Gospel Album	One Lord, One Faith, One Baptism	Won

== MTV Video Music Awards ==
Year	Category	Nominated work	Result	Ref.
1986	Best Female Video	"Freeway of Love"	Nominated	
1987	Best Video from a Film	"Jumpin' Jack Flash"	Nominated	

== NAACP Image Awards ==
Year	Category	Nominated work	Result	Ref.
1983	Outstanding Female Artist	Aretha Franklin	Won	
1997	Hall of Fame Award	Aretha Franklin	Won	
2008	Vanguard Award	Aretha Franklin	Won	
2015	Outstanding Album	"Aretha Franklin Sings the Great Diva Classics"	Won	

== Stellar Awards ==
Year	Category	Work	Result
1989	Urban/Inspirational Single or Performance of the Year	One Lord, One Faith, One Baptism	Won

== TV Land Awards ==
Year	Category	Nominated work	Result	Ref.
2012	Music Icon	Aretha Franklin	Won	

== Other honors ==
Year	Association	Category/Award	Notes
1981	Hollywood Chamber of Commerce	Hollywood Walk of Fame star	This was postponed following the shooting of Aretha's father, Reverend C. L. Franklin
1987	Rock and Roll Hall of Fame	Induction – Performer category	The first woman to be inducted
1994	John F. Kennedy Center for the Performing Arts	Kennedy Center Honors	At the time, the youngest to receive the honor (Stevie Wonder passed the record five years later)
1999	President of the United States	National Arts Medal	
2005	President of the United States	Presidential Medal of Freedom	
2005	UK Music Hall of Fame	Induction	
2012	GMA Gospel Music Hall of Fame	Induction	
2015	Rhythm and Blues Music Hall of Fame	Induction	
2019	Pulitzer Prize	Pulitzer Prize Special Citations and Awards – Arts awards	"For her indelible contribution to American music and culture for more than five decades."
2020	National Women's Hall of Fame	Induction	
2026	Folk Americana Roots Hall of Fame	Induction	

== See also ==
- List of best-selling music artists
- List of Rock and Roll Hall of Fame inductees
