= 100 Greatest Women of Rock & Roll =

- Genre: Documentary
- Starring: Jennifer Lopez; Geri Halliwell; Julianna Margulies; Courteney Cox; Susan Sarandon
- Narrated by: Melinda Mullins
- Country of origin: United States
- Original language: English
- No. of seasons: 1
- No. of episodes: 5

Production
- Running time: 42 min.

Original release
- Network: VH1
- Release: July 26 – July 30, 1999

The "100 Greatest Women of Rock & Roll" was a television special that aired on VH1 from July 26 to July 30, 1999. The special celebrated women in rock music across various genres and decades, highlighting their influence and contributions to the industry.

== Commentators ==
- Tori Amos
- Tyra Banks
- Drew Barrymore
- Pat Benatar
- Tony Bennett
- George Benson
- Jellybean Benítez
- Sandra Bernhard
- David Bowie
- Toni Braxton
- Meredith Brooks
- Julie Brown
- Kate Bush
- Mariah Carey
- Cher
- Tracy Chapman
- Mary Chapin Carpenter
- Bill Clinton
- George Clinton
- Natalie Cole
- Paula Cole
- Shawn Colvin
- Elvis Costello
- Cindy Crawford
- Sheryl Crow
- Alana Davis
- Ellen DeGeneres
- Ani DiFranco
- Céline Dion
- Sheila E.
- Ahmet Ertegun
- Gloria Estefan
- Melissa Etheridge
- Marianne Faithfull
- Roberta Flack
- Lita Ford
- Peter Gabriel
- Andy Garica
- Neil Geraldo
- Barry Gibb
- Maurice Gibb
- Robin Gibb
- Debbie Gibson
- Danny Goldberg
- Kim Gordon
- Daryl Hall
- Emmylou Harris
- Debbie Harry
- Sophie B. Hawkins
- Cindy Herron
- Cissy Houston
- Whitney Houston
- Chrissie Hynde
- Janis Ian
- Jimmy Jam
- Cheryl 'Salt' James
- Jewel
- Grace Jones
- Janis Joplin
- Chaka Khan
- Gladys Knight
- Cyndi Lauper
- Little Richard
- Lisa Loeb
- Jennifer Lopez
- Courtney Love
- Madonna
- Barry Manilow
- Shirley Manson
- Maxwell
- MC Lyte
- Sarah McLachlan
- Christine McVie
- John Mellencamp
- Natalie Merchant
- Joni Mitchell
- Alanis Morissette
- Giorgio Moroder
- Nate Morris
- Olivia Newton-John
- Stevie Nicks
- Brandy Norwood
- Yoko Ono
- Joan Osborne
- Dolly Parton
- Liz Phair
- Michelle Phillips
- Kate Pierson
- John Popper
- Prince
- Queen Latifah
- Bonnie Raitt
- Amy Ray
- Keith Richards
- Ed Robertson
- Robbie Robertson
- Smokey Robinson
- Nile Rodgers
- Henry Rollins
- Emily Saliers
- Seal (musician)
- Fred Schneider
- Jon Secada
- John Shanks
- Gene Simmons
- Carly Simon
- Siouxsie Sioux
- Jake Slichter
- Grace Slick
- Patty Smyth
- Phoebe Snow
- Shawn Stockman
- Ronnie Spector
- Paul Stanley
- Mavis Staples
- Gwen Stefani
- Gloria Steinem
- Rod Stewart
- Tyler Stewart
- Michael Stipe
- Donna Summer
- Neil Tennant
- John Travolta
- Tina Turner
- Shania Twain
- Dionne Warwick
- Jane Wiedlin
- Dan Wilson
- Nancy Wilson
- Stevie Wonder
- Tammy Wynette
- Neil Young

== List ==
Below is the top ten from the list.

1. Aretha Franklin
2. Tina Turner
3. Janis Joplin
4. Bonnie Raitt
5. Joni Mitchell
6. Billie Holiday
7. Chrissie Hynde
8. Madonna
9. Annie Lennox
10. Carole King

Preceded by 100 Greatest Artists of Rock & Roll	100 Greatest Women of Rock & Roll	Next: 100 Greatest Rock & Roll Songs
