= Soul Sister =

Soul Sister may refer to:

- Soul Sister (Shirley Scott album), 1966
- Soul Sister (Aretha Franklin album), 1966
- Soul Sisters, 1963 album by Gloria Coleman
- Soulsister, a Belgian pop group
- Soul Sister (book), a 1969 book by Grace Halsell, who darkened her skin and passed as a black woman
- Soul Sister (musical), a 2012 musical stage show featuring the music of Ike and Tina Turner
- Soul Sister (horse), Thoroughbred racehorse

== See also ==
- Soul Sista, a 2001 album by Keke Wyatt
- "Soul Sista" (song), a 2000 song by Bilal
- "Hey, Soul Sister", a 2009 song by Train
