= 100 Greatest Rock & Roll Songs =

- Genre: Documentary
- Starring: Dylan McDermott
- Narrated by: Dylan McDermott
- Country of origin: United States
- Original language: English
- No. of seasons: 1
- No. of episodes: 5

Production
- Running time: 42 min.

Original release
- Network: VH1
- Release: March 19, 2000

The 100 Greatest Rock & Roll Songs by VH1 is a television countdown special that aired on the VH1 network. It featured a list of what VH1 considered to be the top 100 rock songs of all time, selected based on impact, popularity, and the influence of the songs on rock music as a whole. Hosted and Narrated by Dylan McDermott.

== Commentators ==
- Chuck Berry
- Jon Bon Jovi
- Jason Bonham
- Bono
- David Bowie
- Meredith Brooks
- Jackson Browne
- Jack Bruce
- Ray Charles
- Chubby Checker
- Chuck D
- Eric Clapton
- Kurt Cobain
- Phil Collen
- Alice Cooper
- David Crosby
- Roger Daltrey
- Ray Davies
- Denny Doherty
- Lynn Easton
- Joe Elliott
- John Entwistle
- Ahmet Ertegun
- Melissa Etheridge
- Marianne Faithfull
- Roberta Flack
- John Fogerty
- Art Garfunkel
- Marvin Gaye
- Barry Gibb
- Maurice Gibb
- Robin Gibb
- Al Green
- Dave Grohl
- Daryl Hall
- Debbie Harry
- Don Henley
- Chris Isaak
- Billy Joel
- Elton John
- Bruce Johnston
- Mick Jones
- John Kay
- John Lennon
- Julian Lennon
- Jerry Lee Lewis
- Little Richard
- Mike Love
- MC Hammer
- Ray Manzarek
- Sir George Martin
- Brian May
- Paul McCartney
- Edwin McCain
- Don McLean
- John Mellencamp
- Freddie Mercury
- Mike Mitchell
- Scotty Moore
- Shawn Mullins
- Willie Nelson
- Yoko Ono
- Ozzy Osbourne
- Jimmy Page
- Carl Perkins
- Dick Peterson
- Tom Petty
- Michelle Phillips
- Sam Phillips
- Robert Plant
- Billy Powell
- Joey Ramone
- Bonnie Raitt
- Keith Richards
- Smokey Robinson
- Henry Rollins
- Gary Rossington
- Fred Schneider
- Seal
- Dee Snider
- Bruce Springsteen
- Ringo Starr
- Rod Stewart
- Stephen Stills
- Sting
- Joe Strummer
- Donna Summer
- Bernie Taupin
- Chip Taylor
- James Taylor
- Pete Townshend
- Don Was
- Charlie Watts
- Jerry Wexler
- Ann Wilson
- Brian Wilson
- Carl Wilson
- Nancy Wilson
- Neil Young

== List ==
Below is the top ten from the list.

1. "(I Can't Get No) Satisfaction" by The Rolling Stones
2. "Respect" by Aretha Franklin
3. "Stairway To Heaven" by Led Zeppelin
4. "Like A Rolling Stone" by Bob Dylan
5. "Born To Run" by Bruce Springsteen
6. "Hotel California" by Eagles
7. "Light My Fire" by The Doors
8. "Good Vibrations" by The Beach Boys
9. "Hey Jude" by The Beatles
10. "Imagine" by John Lennon

Preceded by 100 Greatest Women of Rock & Roll	100 Greatest Rock & Roll Songs	Next: 100 Greatest Rock & Roll Moments on TV
