= Yeah!!! =

1965 studio album by Aretha Franklin

Studio album by Aretha Franklin
- Released: May 17, 1965
- Recorded: February–April, 1965
- Studios: Columbia Studios, (New York City, New York)
- Genres: Vocal jazz, R&B
- Length: 35:28
- Label: Columbia
- Producer: Clyde Otis

Aretha Franklin chronology
Runnin' Out of Fools (1964)	Yeah!!! (1965)	Songs of Faith (1965)

Professional ratings
Review scores
Source	Rating
Allmusic	2/5 stars

Yeah!!! (or Aretha Franklin in Person With Her Quartet) is the seventh studio album by American singer Aretha Franklin. Released on May 17, 1965, by Columbia Records. Contrary to the overdubbed sounds of audience murmurs, the album was not a live album, but instead was recorded live at New York's Columbia Studios and produced by Clyde Otis. This would be Franklin's last collection of jazz recordings until the release of 1969's Soul '69, released during her landmark tenure at Atlantic Records. An expanded version of the album that also contains the original session tracks without audience overdubs has been released on CD in the Columbia Box Set Take a Look: Aretha Franklin Complete On Columbia.

== Track listing ==
1. "This Could Be the Start of Something" (Steve Allen) (1:23)
2. "Once In a Lifetime" (Anthony Newley, Leslie Bricusse) (3:20)
3. "Misty" (Erroll Garner, Johnny Burke) (3:35)
4. "More" (Nino Oliviero, Riz Ortolani, Norman Newell) (1:55)
5. "There Is No Greater Love" (Isham Jones, Marty Symes) (4:39)
6. "Muddy Water" (Eddie Miller) (2:22)
7. "If I Had a Hammer" (Lee Hays, Pete Seeger) (2:29)
8. "Impossible" (Steve Allen) (3:22)
9. "Today I Love Ev'rybody" (Harold Arlen, Dorothy Fields) (3:24)
10. "Without The One You Love" (Aretha Franklin) (3:34)
11. "Trouble in Mind" (Richard M. Jones) (2:53)
12. "Love for Sale" (Cole Porter) (2:29)

== Personnel ==
- Aretha Franklin – vocals, piano
- Kenny Burrell – guitar
- Hindel Butts – drums (Hindal Butts)
- James "Beans" Richardson – bass guitar
- Teddy Harris – piano

Technical

- Henry Parker – photography
