= La Diva (Aretha Franklin album) =

1979 studio album by Aretha Franklin

Studio album by Aretha Franklin
- Released: September 6, 1979
- Recorded: February–May, 1979
- Studios: Penny Lane (New York City, New York) Record Plant (Los Angeles, California)
- Genres: Disco, R&B, pop
- Length: 44:28
- Label: Atlantic (#19248)
- Producers: Aretha Franklin; Charles Kipps; Skip Scarborough; Van McCoy

Aretha Franklin chronology
Almighty Fire (1978)	La Diva (1979)	Aretha (1980)

Singles from La Diva
- 1. "Ladies Only" Released: August 7, 1979; 2. "Half a Love" Released: November 1979

La Diva is the twenty-fifth studio album by American singer Aretha Franklin, released on September 6, 1979, by Atlantic Records. The album marked the end of her 12-year tenure with Atlantic and a run of 19 original albums. The album was a commercial flop as the singer attempted to make a comeback by recording a disco-oriented project with producer Van McCoy. It was McCoy's final work as he died in June of that year; the record was released as disco was running its course.

It stands as the lowest charting and poorest selling album of Franklin's entire Atlantic Records catalogue. "Ladies Only" reached number 33 on Billboard's R&B singles chart while the follow-up, "Half a Love", stalled at number 65. This album was recorded at Franklin's vocal peak and features three of her own compositions, as well as a song by her eldest son Clarence Franklin.

Although remembered as Franklin's failed disco LP, La Diva also includes substantial funk and R&B tracks such as the Emotions' "Reasons Why", Zulema's "Half a Love" and scorching versions of Lalomie Washburn's "It's Gonna Get A Bit Better" and her own "Honey I Need Your Love".

== Critical reception ==
Professional ratings
Review scores
Source	Rating
AllMusic	2/5 stars
Christgau's Record Guide	B
Music Week	3/4 stars
The Rolling Stone Album Guide	2/5 stars

The Globe and Mail wrote that "the Van McCoy rhythm tracks which push along a large part of the album are generally second-rate for [disco], and tend to restrict her – she's always been best when working in a variety of styles."

== Track listing ==
Side one

1. "Ladies Only" (Aretha Franklin) – 5:15
2. "It's Gonna Get a Bit Better" (Lalome Washburn) – 5:20
3. "What If I Should Ever Need You" (Charles H. Kipps) – 3:32
4. "Honey I Need Your Love" (Aretha Franklin) – 2:45
5. "I Was Made for You" (Clarence Franklin) – 4:03

Side two

1. "Only Star" (Aretha Franklin) – 5:04
2. "Reasons Why" (Skip Scarborough, Wanda Hutchinson, Wayne Vaughan) – 3:55
3. "You Brought Me Back to Life" (Van McCoy) – 4:24
4. "Half a Love" (Zulema Cusseaux) – 5:25
5. "The Feeling" (Van McCoy) – 4:45

== Personnel ==
Musicians

- Aretha Franklin – vocals, backing vocals
- Kenneth Ascher – keyboards
- Paul Griffin – keyboards
- Van McCoy – keyboards, backing vocals
- Richard Tee – keyboards
- Ken Bichel – synthesizer, orchestra bells
- Jack Cavari – guitars
- Cornell Dupree – guitars
- Tom Hanlon – guitars
- Brian Allsop – bass
- Gordon Edwards – bass
- Chris Parker – drums
- Errol "Crusher" Bennett – percussion
- George Devens – percussion
- Gene Orloff – horn and string conductor (1–3, 5, 6, 8–10)
- Albert Bailey – backing vocals
- Sharon Brown – backing vocals
- Zulema Cusseaux – backing vocals
- Diane Destry – backing vocals
- Carolyn Franklin – backing vocals
- Richard Harris – background vocals
- Brenda Hilliard – backing vocals
- Jerome Jackson – backing vocals
- Pete Marshall – backing vocals
- Pat Williamson – backing vocals
- Rocquel Cox – backing vocals
- Eric Robinson – vocals (5)

Music arrangements

- Van McCoy – rhythm arrangements (1, 3–5, 8, 10), horn and string arrangements (1–3, 5, 6, 8–10)
- Richard Gibbs – rhythm arrangements (2)
- Aretha Franklin – rhythm arrangements (4), horn and string arrangements (4)
- Arthur Jenkins – rhythm arrangements (6)
- Skip Scarborough – rhythm arrangements (7), horn and string arrangements (7)
- Zulema Cusseaux – rhythm arrangements (9), horn and string arrangements (9)

Production

- Charles Kipps – producer (1–3, 5, 6, 8–10)
- Van McCoy – producer (1–3, 5, 6, 8–10)
- Aretha Franklin – producer (4)
- Skip Scarborough – producer (7)
- Lee DeCarlo – engineer (lead vocals)
- Alan Varner – engineer (rhythm, horns, strings)
- Rick Delana – assistant engineer (lead vocals)
- Brian Marine – assistant engineer (rhythm, horns, strings)
- John Terrell – assistant engineer (rhythm, horns, strings)
- George Piros – mastering at Atlantic Studios (New York, NY)
