= Charles H. Ellis III =

American Apostolic Pentecostal preacher

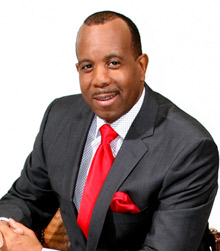
Bishop Ellis in 2013

Charles H. Ellis III (born July 8, 1958) is an American Apostolic Pentecostal preacher and the former Presiding Bishop of the Pentecostal Assemblies of the World. He is the pastor of the Greater Grace Temple, a megachurch in Detroit, Michigan, succeeding his father, Bishop David L. Ellis, Sr.

== Career ==
Ellis graduated from Wayne State University in 1983. In 1996, Ellis assumed leadership of Greater Grace Temple upon the death of his father, David L. Ellis. In 2002, the church moved to its new building, “The City of David,” a 19-acre complex first envisioned by his father. Ellis used the new building's hydraulic floors for productions, including the funerals of Rosa Parks, Emanuel Steward, Levi Stubbs, and Ron Banks. Under Ellis, the Greater Grace Temple has also become known for its illustrated sermons, which dramatize the gospel. At presentations of “The Whip, Hammer & Cross” and “To Hell and Back” as many as 5,000 people attend the congregation.

In 2010, Ellis was elected as the 10th Presiding Bishop of the Pentecostal Assemblies of the World. In 2015, Ellis was featured in Oxygen's series Preachers of Detroit, a spin-off of its Preachers of L.A. series.

=== Prayer Day for Auto Workers ===
In 2008 Bishop Ellis and Greater Grace Temple called for a "Prayer Day for Auto Workers" because of the ongoing automotive industry crisis. He prayed for the autoworkers at an altar surrounded by three SUVs and told them that God would not fail them. He told The New York Times, “We have never seen as midnight an hour as we face this coming week,” Bishop Ellis said, referring to the possibility that Congress would soon vote on a deal to give the carmakers enough money to stay afloat into next year. I don't know what's going to happen, but we need prayer,” he said. “When it’s all said and done, we’re all in this thing together.”

=== Ariana Grande groping incident ===
After Ariana Grande performed a rendition of "Natural Woman" at the televised funeral of Aretha Franklin, Bishop Ellis hugged Grande and unprompted, led her by the waist to the microphone where he made an off the cuff comment comparing her name to an order at Taco Bell. During the interaction, his hands were around the side of her chest with his fingers digging into her breast. The moment went viral gaining national coverage with numerous online posts citing Grande's uncomfortable reaction to Bishop Ellis "groping" her.

The incident prompted many phone calls to the Detroit Police with The Police Capt. Jevon Johnson telling The Detroit Free Press, "We received some phone calls from citizens and saw (social media posts) that there may have been some kind of inappropriate contact...between Bishop Ellis and Ariana Grande". Grande declined to file a complaint wishing to move on from the incident.

Ellis released an apology following coverage of the incident in the press, saying that it was not his intention and that he had hugged all the performers. In the statement, Ellis also apologized for joke comparing her to an fast food item which viewers took to be a sexist and racist comment. Shannon Green of the Orlando Sentinel criticized his apology describing it as weak, but commended the "supporters of the MeToo movement" for "rightfully shaming the bishop for his inappropriate touching".
