= Songs of Faith (Aretha Franklin album) =

1965 live album by Aretha Franklin

Live album by Aretha Franklin
- Released: 1965
- Recorded: 1956
- Venues: New Bethel Baptist Church (Detroit, Michigan)
- Genre: Gospel
- Length: 31:29
- Label: Checker
- Producer: Joe Von Battle

Aretha Franklin chronology
Yeah!!! (1965)	Songs of Faith (1965)	Soul Sister (1966)

Singles from Songs of Faith
- 1. "Never Grow Old" Released: 1956; 2. "Precious Lord" Released: 1959

Songs of Faith is the first live album by American singer Aretha Franklin. It was released in 1965 by Checker Records. The album was recorded in 1956 by J-V-B Records at New Bethel Baptist Church in Detroit, Michigan, when Franklin was aged 14.

== Background ==
Aretha Franklin's recording career began in 1956 with the help of local record label J-V-B Records. Recording equipment was installed in the New Bethel Baptist Church and nine tracks were recorded, featuring Franklin on vocals and piano. In 1956, J-V-B released Franklin's first single, "Never Grow Old", backed with "You Grow Closer". A second single, "Precious Lord (Part One)" backed with "Precious Lord (Part Two)" was issued in 1959. These four tracks, with the addition of "There Is a Fountain Filled with Blood", were released on side one of the 1956 album, Spirituals (J-V-B 100), which was reissued in 1962 under the same title by Battle Records (Battle 6105).

In 1965, Checker Records released Songs of Faith, featuring the five tracks from the 1956 Spirituals album, with the addition of four previously unreleased recordings.

== Reissues ==
MCA reissued the original 9 track album on Compact Disc in 1991 as Aretha Gospel. After Aretha's passing in 2018, UMG/Geffen Records reissued it as Songs of Faith: Aretha Gospel.

== Track listing ==
Side one
No.	Title	Writer(s)	Length
1.	"There Is a Fountain Filled with Blood"	William Cowper	4:26
2.	"Precious Lord" (Part One)	Rev. Thomas A. Dorsey	3:23
3.	"Precious Lord" (Part Two)	Rev. Thomas A. Dorsey	2:51
4.	"You Grow Closer"	Joe B. Junior	2:43
5.	"Never Grow Old"	Traditional	2:55

Side two
No.	Title	Writer(s)	Length
1.	"The Day Is Past and Gone"	Rev. Thomas A. Dorsey, Joe B. Junior, Isaac Watts	4:57
2.	"He Will Wash You White As Snow"	Joe B. Junior	4:18
3.	"While the Blood Runs Warm"	Ralph Bass, Sonny Thompson, Harold Smith	3:03
4.	"Yield Not to Temptation"	Sonny Thompson, Harold Smith, Horatio Richmond Palmer	2:56
