= Sweet Passion =

1977 studio album by Aretha Franklin

Studio album by Aretha Franklin
- Released: May 19, 1977
- Recorded: 1976–1977
- Studios: ABC Recording Studios (Los Angeles, CA); Whitney Recording Studios (Glendale, CA)
- Genres: R&B; soul
- Length: 45:30
- Label: Atlantic (#19102)
- Producers: Aretha Franklin, Lamont Dozier, Marvin Hamlisch, Carole Bayer Sager

Aretha Franklin chronology
Sparkle (1976)	Sweet Passion (1977)	Almighty Fire (1978)

Singles from Sweet Passion
- 1. "Break It To Me Gently" Released: April 1977

Sweet Passion is the twenty-third studio album by American singer Aretha Franklin. It was released on May 19, 1977, by Atlantic Records. Following Franklin's Gold-certified 1976 soundtrack album, Sparkle, she paired up with Motown producer Lamont Dozier to produce Sweet Passion. It was, however, a commercial and critical failure.

The album's lead single, "Break It To Me Gently", topped the Billboard R&B chart but peaked at No. 85 on the Hot 100 and dropped off the chart after two weeks.

== Critical reception ==
Professional ratings
Review scores
Source	Rating
AllMusic	2/5 stars
Christgau's Record Guide	C+
The Rolling Stone Album Guide	2/5 stars

The Bay State Banner noted that "her voice seems to free itself, even during the most stilted and contrived show tunes, stronger and lots weightier than Natalie Cole's cheery mimicry."

== Track listing ==
=== Side one ===
1. "Break It To Me Gently" (Marvin Hamlisch, Carole Bayer Sager) - 3:21
2. "When I Think About You" (Aretha Franklin) - 4:46
3. "What I Did for Love" (Marvin Hamlisch, Edward Kleban) - 5:17
4. "No One Could Ever Love You More" (Lamont Dozier) - 3:36
5. "A Tender Touch" (Aretha Franklin) - 3:58

=== Side two ===
1. "Touch Me Up" (Lamont Dozier)- 4:38
2. "Sunshine Will Never Be The Same" (Lamont Dozier) - 3:36
3. "Meadows of Springtime" (Aretha Franklin) - 5:26
4. "Mumbles / I've Got the Music in Me" (Clark Terry, Aretha Franklin, Bias Boshell) - 3:40
5. "Sweet Passion" (Aretha Franklin) - 7:12

== Personnel ==
- Aretha Franklin – vocals, keyboards (5, 9, 10)
- H. B. Barnum – rhythm arrangements (2, 3, 5, 8–10), horn arrangements (2, 3, 5, 8–10), string arrangements (2, 3, 5, 8, 10), keyboards (5)
- Ray Brown – bass guitar (3, 8, 9)
- Sonny Burke – keyboards (2, 3, 4, 6, 7)
- Joe Clayton – congas (1), percussion (5)
- Gary Coleman – percussion (2, 4, 6, 7, 10)
- Ronald Coleman – keyboards (2, 4, 6, 7)
- Lamont Dozier – rhythm arrangements (4, 7)
- Scott Edwards – bass guitar (2, 4, 6, 7, 10)
- James Gadson – drums (2, 4, 6, 7, 10)
- McKinley Jackson – rhythm arrangements (4, 6, 7), horn arrangements (6)
- Harold Mason – drums (1, 3, 5, 8, 9)
- Craig McMillian – guitar (3, 8, 9)
- Mike Morgan – guitar (3, 8, 9)
- Gene Page – horn and string arrangements (4, 7)
- David Paich – keyboards (1)
- Ray Parker Jr. – guitar (1, 2, 4, 5, 7, 10)
- Chuck Rainey – bass guitar (1, 5)
- Lee Ritenour – guitar (1, 4–6, 10)
- Sylvester Rivers – keyboards (1, 3, 8, 9)
- Bob Zimmitti – percussion (3, 8, 9)

=== Production ===
- Producers – Marvin Hamlisch and Carole Bayer Sager (Track 1); Lamont Dozier and Aretha Franklin (Tracks 2–10).
- Co-Producers on Track 1 – David Paich and Marty Paich.
- Engineers – Frank Kemjar (Tracks 1, 5 & 10); Reginald Dozier (Tracks 2, 4, 6–8); Barney Perkins (3, 6 & 9).
- Mixing – Reginald Dozier (Tracks 2–10); Barney Perkins (Track 6).
- Recorded and Mixed at ABC Recording Studios (Los Angeles, CA) and Whitney Recording Studios (Glendale, CA).
- Track 1 mixed at Studio 55 (Los Angeles, CA).
- Mastered by Dennis King at Atlantic Studios (New York, NY).
- Art Direction – Bob Defrin
- Photography – David Alexander
