= Break It to Me Gently (Aretha Franklin song) =

Single by Aretha Franklin

from the album Sweet Passion
- B-side: "Meadows of Springtime"
- Released: April 8, 1977
- Recorded: 1977
- Genre: R&B; soul
- Length: 3:19 (single)
- Label: Atlantic
- Songwriter(s): Carole Bayer Sager; Marvin Hamlisch
- Producer(s): Carole Bayer Sager; Marvin Hamlisch

Aretha Franklin singles chronology
"Something He Can Feel" (1976)	"Break It to Me Gently" (1977)	"What a Fool Believes" (1981)

"Break It to Me Gently" is a song by American singer Aretha Franklin, released in 1977 as the first single from her album, Sweet Passion. The track was written and produced by Carole Bayer Sager and Marvin Hamlisch which was an R&B hit for Franklin, it reached number one on Billboard's Hot Soul Singles chart in June 1977.

The song's success was only faintly reflected on the Billboard Hot 100 with a Number 85 peak, before dropping out of the Hot 100 after two weeks. "Break It to Me Gently" would be Franklin's final Atlantic single to appear on the Hot 100 - from which she would be absent until 1980.

== Track listing ==
- US, UK 7" Vinyl single
  - A1. "Break It to Me Gently" – 3:19
  - B1. "Meadows of Springtime" – 5:34

== Personnel and credits ==
Performers

- Aretha Franklin – vocals
- Joe Clayton – congas
- Harold Mason – drums
- David Paich – keyboards
- Ray Parker Jr. – guitar
- Chuck Rainey – bass guitar
- Lee Ritenour – guitar
- Sylvester Rivers – keyboards

Production

- Producers – Marvin Hamlisch and Carole Bayer-Sager.
- Co-Producers – David Paich and Marty Paich.
- Engineers – Frank Kemjar.
- Mixed at Studio 55 (Los Angeles, CA).

== Charts ==
Charts (1977)	Peak position
US Billboard Hot 100	85
US Billboard Hot Soul Singles	1
