= Never Gonna Break My Faith =

Song by Aretha Franklin
- Released: 2006
- Genre: Gospel
- Label: RCA
- Songwriters: Bryan Adams, Eliot Kennedy, Andrea Remanda
- Producer: The Underdogs

"Never Gonna Break My Faith" is a song by American soul singer Aretha Franklin. It was released in October 2006 as a duet with Mary J Blige and Boys Choir of Harlem and featured in the film Bobby about the last moments of the life of Robert F. Kennedy.

Twelve years after its release in the film, an unheard solo performance of Aretha Franklin singing the song was released to commemorate Juneteenth 2020 with a new video visualizing the American human rights movement. This caused the song to enter the Billboard gospel charts at #1, giving Franklin the distinction of having had #1 records in every decade since the 1960s

== Background ==
Written by songwriters Bryan Adams and Eliot Kennedy, the song was awarded a Grammy Award for Best Gospel/Contemporary Christian Music Performance in 2008. Andrea Remanda is also credited as songwriter on the song. Franklin performed the song live at the MusiCares event on 8 February 2008, where she was honored as the MusiCares Person of the Year, 2008.
