= 100 Greatest Artists of Rock & Roll =

- Genre: Documentary
- Starring: Kevin Bacon
- Narrated by: Melinda Mullins
- Country of origin: United States
- Original language: English
- No. of seasons: 1
- No. of episodes: 5

Production
- Running time: 42 min.

Original release
- Network: VH1
- Release: March 28, 1998

The 100 Greatest Artists of Rock & Roll was a television special that aired on VH1 in 1998, where the network compiled a list of what it considered the 100 greatest rock artists. The show included artists from a variety of genres within rock, such as classic rock, punk, alternative, and heavy metal. The artists were selected based on their impact on the genre, influence on other musicians, and commercial success. Hosted by Kevin Bacon.

The television special ran on five days between March 31 and April 4, 1998, for an hour each. Every special covered 20 artists from the list. The special used footage from videos, concerts, and interviews. Jeff Gaspin, who had recently become VH1's vice president of programming, proposed that they feature a countdown program in which musicians determined the list rather than commentators.

== Commentators ==
- Bryan Adams
- Rick Allen
- Bono
- David Bowie
- Meredith Brooks
- Jimmy Buffett
- David Byrne
- Dick Cavett
- Shawn Colvin
- David Crosby
- Sheryl Crow
- Joe Elliott
- Art Garfunkel
- Melissa Joan Hart??
- Jimi Hendrix (archive footage)
- Indigo Girls (Amy Ray, Emily Saliers)
- Billy Joel
- Elton John
- Jim Kerr
- B.B. King
- Lenny Kravitz
- Annie Lennox
- Little Richard
- Lyle Lovett
- MC Hammer
- Madonna
- Paul McCartney
- Reba McEntire
- Sarah McLachlan
- Freddie Mercury (archive footage)
- Graham Nash
- Brandy Norwood
- Teddy Pendergrass
- Tom Petty
- Robert Plant
- Robbie Robertson
- Chris Robinson
- Nile Rodgers
- The Rolling Stones (Keith Richards)
- Henry Rollins
- Mick Ronson
- Richie Sambora
- Seal
- Gene Simmons
- Paul Stanley
- Sting
- Bernie Taupin
- Tina Turner
- Steven Tyler
- Eddie Vedder
- The Who (Roger Daltrey, John Entwistle, Pete Townshend)
- Nancy Wilson

== List ==
Below is the top ten from the list.

1. The Beatles
2. The Rolling Stones
3. Jimi Hendrix
4. Led Zeppelin
5. Bob Dylan
6. James Brown
7. David Bowie
8. Elvis Presley
9. The Who
10. The Police

== Reception ==
The Boston Globe television critic Steve Morse criticized the special, writing, "the list could have been better, and so could the show, which succumbs to numbing repetition and is undone by Bacon's goofy rah-rah attitude and by an insipid female voice-over". Tony Gieske of The Hollywood Reporter penned a mixed review of the special. Calling it a high-speed panorama, he said, "The songs, the artists and the commentary are perforce familiar if not banal, so it's all in the editing, which is fortunately first-rate in the Jet Ski style for which MTV is famous." The Record's Bob Ivry found it to be a "mild surprise" that few women ranked highly in the list. He noted that the top two women were Aretha Franklin at 21 and Joni Mitchell at 32.
