= Aretha (1980 album) =

1980 studio album by Aretha Franklin

Studio album by Aretha Franklin
- Released: September 30, 1980
- Recorded: April–July 1980
- Studios: MCA Whitney Recording Studios (Glendale, California); Record Plant (Los Angeles, California); Sound Labs Studios and Cherokee Studios (Hollywood, California); Atlantic Studios (New York City, New York)
- Genres: Soul; funk; pop
- Length: 39:23
- Label: Arista
- Producers: Chuck Jackson; Arif Mardin; Aretha Franklin

Aretha Franklin chronology
La Diva (1979)	Aretha (1980)	Aretha Sings the Blues (1980)

Singles from Aretha
- 1. "United Together" Released: October 1980 (US); 2. "What a Fool Believes" Released: February 1981 (US); 3. "Come to Me" Released: May 1981 (US)

Professional ratings
Review scores
Source	Rating
AllMusic	3/5 stars
Billboard	(unrated)
Robert Christgau	B−
The Rolling Stone Album Guide	2/5 stars

Aretha is the twenty-sixth studio album by American singer Aretha Franklin. It was released on September 30, 1980, by Arista Records. This is Franklin's second eponymous album, and her first for Arista Records after a 12-year tenure with Atlantic Records.

Franklin's first Arista single release, "United Together", reached number 3 on the Soul chart and crossed over to number 56 on Billboard's Hot 100. The album itself peaked at number 47 and spent 30 weeks on the Billboard album chart.

The album's opening track, "Come to Me", appeared again on Franklin's 1989 album, Through the Storm.

One of the album's collaborators, Phil Perry, who helped to pen "United Together", would go on to score a number one R&B hit in 1991 with his rendition of Franklin's 1970 hit, "Call Me".

== Track listing ==
Information is taken from the album's liner notes

No.	Title	Writer(s)	Length
1.	"Come to Me"	Willard Gene Price	3:42
2.	"I Can't Turn You Loose"	Otis Redding	3:55
3.	"United Together"	Phil Perry, Chuck Jackson	5:02
4.	"Take Me With You"	Phil Perry, Terry Coleman, Chuck Jackson	4:05
5.	"Whatever It Is"	Mark Gary, Eddie Setser, Jerry Michael	3:38
6.	"What a Fool Believes"	Kenny Loggins, Michael McDonald	5:13
7.	"Together Again"	Aretha Franklin, Phil Perry, Chuck Jackson	3:34
8.	"Love Me Forever"	Franklin, Kenny Moore, Patrick Henderson	4:47
9.	"School Days"	Franklin	4:54

== Personnel ==
Information is taken from the album's liner notes

Musicians

- Aretha Franklin – lead vocals, keyboards (3–5, 7, 9), arrangements (7, 9), acoustic piano (8)
- David Foster – electric piano (1, 2, 6), synthesizer (1, 2, 6)
- David Paich – acoustic piano (1), organ (8)
- Todd Cochran – synthesizer programming (2, 6)
- Bob Christianson – additional synthesizer (2)
- Steve Porcaro – additional synthesizer (2)
- Michael Lang – keyboards (3–5, 7, 9)
- Richard Tee – keyboards (3–5, 7, 9)
- Tony Coleman – keyboards (3–5, 7, 9), bass (3–5, 7, 9), drum overdubs (3–5, 7, 9)
- Steve Lukather – guitars (2, 6, 8)
- David Williams – guitars (2, 6, 8)
- Cornell Dupree – guitars (3–5, 7, 9)
- Paul Jackson Jr. – guitars (3–5, 7, 9)
- Michael McGlory – guitars (3–5, 7, 9)
- Louis Johnson – bass (1, 2, 6)
- Scott Edwards – bass (3–5, 7, 9)
- James Jamerson Sr. – bass (3–5, 7, 9)
- Mike Porcaro – bass (8)
- Jeff Porcaro – drums (1, 2, 6, 8)
- Ed Greene – drums (3–5, 7, 9)
- Bernard Purdie – drums (3–5, 7, 9)
- George Devens – percussion (1)
- David Sanborn – alto sax solo (6)
- David "Fathead" Newman – tenor sax solo (8)

Horns and Strings on "Love Me Forever"

- Arif Mardin – arrangements

Horn section

- Dave Tofani – alto saxophone
- Lew Del Gatto – baritone saxophone
- Michael Brecker and Seldon Powell – tenor saxophone
- Barry Rogers – trombone
- Randy Brecker – trumpet
- Lew Soloff – lead trumpet
- John Clark and Peter Gordon – French horn

String section

- Gene Orloff – concertmaster
- Jonathan Abramowitz, Julien Barber, Alfred Brown, Frederick Buldrini, Peter Dimitriades, Harold Kohon, Harry Lookofsky, Alan Shulman, Joe Malin, Mitsue Takayama, Gerald Tarack, Mark Wayne-Wright and Fred Zlotkin – string players

Background vocalists

- Edie Lehmann – backing vocals (1, 3–5, 7, 9)
- Myrna Matthews – backing vocals (1, 3–5, 7, 9)
- Marti McCall – backing vocals (1, 3–5, 7, 9)
- Estelle Brown – backing vocals (2, 8)
- Brenda Corbett – backing vocals (2)
- Cissy Houston – backing vocals (2)
- Sylvia Shemwell – backing vocals (2, 8)
- Myrna Smith – backing vocals (2, 8)
- Tony Coleman – backing vocals (3–5, 7, 9)
- Aretha Franklin – backing vocals (3–5, 7, 9), all backing vocals (6)
- Charles Jackson – backing vocals (3–5, 7, 9)
- The Sweet Inspirations – backing vocals (3–5, 7, 9)
- Hamish Stuart – additional backing vocals (6)

== Production ==
- Arif Mardin – producer (1, 2, 6, 8)
- Chuck Jackson – producer (3–5, 7, 9)
- Aretha Franklin – producer (9)
- Frank DeCaro – music contractor, music coordinator (Los Angeles)
- Chrissy Allerdings – music coordinator (New York)
- Ria Lewerke-Shapiro – art direction, design
- George Hurrell – photography

Technical credits

- Jeremy Smith – recording (1, 2, 6, 8)
- Lew Hahn – remixing (1, 2, 6), additional recording (1, 2, 6, 8)
- Arif Mardin – remixing (1, 2, 6, 8)
- Gene Paul – remixing (1, 2, 6)
- Lee DeCarlo – engineer (3–5, 7, 9)
- Frank Kejmar – engineer (3–5, 7, 9)
- Reginald Dozier – mixing (3–5, 7, 9)
- Michael O'Reilly – assistant engineer (1, 2, 6, 8), remixing (8)
- Stewart Whitmore – assistant engineer (1, 2, 6, 8)
- Joe Mardin – remix assistant (8)

== Charts ==
=== Weekly charts ===
Chart (1980–1981)	Peak position
US Billboard 200	47
US Top R&B/Hip-Hop Albums (Billboard)	6

=== Year-end charts ===
Chart (1981)	Position
US Billboard 200	90
US Top R&B/Hip-Hop Albums (Billboard)	15
