= Runnin' Out of Fools =

1964 studio album by Aretha Franklin

Studio album by Aretha Franklin
- Released: November 16, 1964
- Genres: Soul, R&B
- Length: 31:18
- Label: Columbia
- Producer: Clyde Otis

Aretha Franklin chronology
Unforgettable: A Tribute to Dinah Washington (1964)	Runnin' Out of Fools (1964)	Yeah!!! (1965)

Professional ratings
Review scores
Source	Rating
AllMusic	2/5 stars
The Encyclopedia of Popular Music	2/5 stars

Runnin' Out of Fools is the sixth studio album by American singer Aretha Franklin, released in 1964 by Columbia Records. It was arranged and conducted by Belford Hendricks. The front cover photograph was taken by Henry Parker.

== Track listing ==
Side One

1. "Mockingbird" (Charlie Foxx, Inez Foxx)
2. "How Glad I Am" (Jimmy Williams, Larry Harrison)
3. "Walk On By" (Hal David, Burt Bacharach)
4. "Every Little Bit Hurts" (Ed Cobb)
5. "The Shoop Shoop Song (It's in His Kiss)" (Rudy Clark)
6. "You'll Lose a Good Thing" (Barbara Lynn Ozen)

Side Two

1. "I Can't Wait Until I See My Baby's Face" (Chip Taylor, Norman Meade)
2. "It's Just a Matter of Time" (Belford Hendricks, Clyde Otis, Brook Benton)
3. "Runnin' Out of Fools" (Kay Rogers, Richard Ahlert)
4. "My Guy" (Smokey Robinson)
5. "Two Sides of Love" (Roy Alfred)
6. "One Room Paradise" (John Leslie McFarland)
