= Soul Sister (Aretha Franklin album) =

1966 studio album by Aretha Franklin

Studio album by Aretha Franklin
- Released: June 13, 1966
- Length: 29:49
- Label: Columbia
- Producers: Bob Johnston, Clyde Otis

Aretha Franklin chronology
| Songs of Faith (1965) | Soul Sister (1966) | Take It Like You Give It (1967) |

Professional ratings
Review scores
| Source | Rating |
|---|---|
| Allmusic | 3/5 stars |

Soul Sister is the eighth studio album by American singer Aretha Franklin, released in 1966 by Columbia Records.

== Track listing ==
Side One

1. "Until You Were Gone" (Joy Byers) (3:00)
2. "You Made Me Love You (I Didn't Want to Do It)" (James V. Monaco, Joseph McCarthy) (2:32)
3. "Follow Your Heart" (Van McCoy, Belford Hendricks) (2:24)
4. "Ol' Man River" (Oscar Hammerstein II, Jerome Kern) (4:05)
5. "Sweet Bitter Love" (Van McCoy) (2:57)
6. "A Mother's Love" (Cliff Owens) (2:30)

Side Two

1. "Swanee" (Irving Caesar, George Gershwin) (2:24)
2. "(No, No) I'm Losing You" (Joy Byers) (3:08)
3. "Take a Look" (Clyde Otis) (2:40)
4. "Can't You Just See Me" (Belford Hendricks) (2:00)
5. "Cry Like a Baby" (Jo Armstead, Nickolas Ashford, Valerie Simpson) (2:09)

== Personnel ==
- Belford Hendricks - arrangements, conductor (tracks: A5, A6, B3)
- Robert Mersey - arrangements, conductor (tracks: A1, A2, A4, B1, B2)
- Bob Johnston - producer (tracks: A1, A2, B1, B2)
- Clyde Otis - producer (tracks: A3, A5, A6, B3 to B5)
- Henry Parker - cover photography
