= Almighty Fire =

1978 studio album by Aretha Franklin

Studio album by Aretha Franklin
- Released: April 13, 1978
- Recorded: January–March 1978
- Studios: Curtom (Chicago, Illinois); ABC (Los Angeles, California); MCA Whitney (Glendale, California
- Genres: Soul, R&B
- Length: 34:42
- Label: Atlantic (#19161)
- Producer: Curtis Mayfield

Aretha Franklin chronology
Sweet Passion (1977)	Almighty Fire (1978)	La Diva (1979)

Singles from Almighty Fire
- 1. "Almighty Fire (Woman of the Future)" Released: April 1978; 2. "More Than Just a Joy" Released: July 1978

Almighty Fire is the twenty-fourth studio album by American singer Aretha Franklin, released on April 13, 1978, by Atlantic Records. By the time of the album's release, Franklin was going through a commercial slump.

Franklin was reunited with Curtis Mayfield – who produced the album and composed all the tracks –after their earlier success together with the Sparkle soundtrack.

The title single reached at No. 12 on the Billboard R&B Singles Chart and the follow-up single, "More Than Just a Joy", peaked at No. 51. The album earned a Grammy nomination for Best R&B Vocal Performance, Female at the 1979 Grammy Awards.

== Critical reception ==
Professional ratings
Review scores
Source	Rating
AllMusic	2/5 stars
Christgau's Record Guide	C+
MusicHound Rock: The Essential Album Guide	1.5/5 stars
The Rolling Stone Album Guide	2/5 stars
The Virgin Encyclopedia of R&B and Soul	2/5 stars

The New York Times panned Mayfield's work as "tuneless, fussily arranged songs", but praised Franklin and Turman's "I'm Your Speed" for the space it creates for her to "breathe real fire into the music."

Rolling Stone praised "I'm Your Speed" at length, calling it the album's "one moment of pop music transcendence." It called "No Matter Who You Love" as a standout, but considered the album's arrangements "unglamorous and cheesy," and chastised the music Mayfield brought to the table as "stifling," while comparing it to the excitement of the previous Franklin-Mayfield pairing, 1976's Sparkle.

== Track listing ==
All tracks composed by Curtis Mayfield, except where noted.

Side one

1. "Almighty Fire (Woman of the Future)" – 4:36
2. "Lady, Lady" – 2:45
3. "More Than Just a Joy" – 3:03
4. "Keep On Loving You" – 3:12
5. "I Needed You Baby" – 4:38

Side two

1. "Close to You" – 4:22
2. "No Matter Who You Love" – 4:01
3. "This You Can Believe" – 4:46
4. "I'm Your Speed" (Aretha Franklin, Glynn Turman) – 3:40

== Personnel ==
- Aretha Franklin – vocals
- Rich Tufo – keyboards, arrangements
- Curtis Mayfield – lead guitars
- Gary Thompson – rhythm guitars
- Joseph "Lucky" Scott – bass guitar
- Donnell Hagan – drums
- Henry Gibson – congas
- Lenard Druss – horns contractor
- Sol Bobrov – strings contractor
- Mattie Butler – backing vocals
- Ricky Linton – backing vocals
- Denise Heard – backing vocals
- The Jones Girls – backing vocals
- Alfonso Surrett – backing vocals

Production

- Curtis Mayfield – producer
- Roger Anfinsen – recording engineer, remixing
- Fred Breitberg – recording engineer
- Dennis King – mastering at Atlantic Studios (New York City, New York)
- Aretha Franklin – album cover concept
