= UK Music Hall of Fame =

British music award (2004–2006)

- Awarded for: Lifetime contributions to music
- Country: United Kingdom
- First award: 10 October 2004; 22 years ago
- Final award: 14 November 2006

Television/radio coverage
- Network: Channel 4

The UK Music Hall of Fame was an awards ceremony to honour musicians, of any nationality, for their lifetime contributions to music in the United Kingdom. The hall of fame started in 2004 with the induction of five founder members and five more members selected by a public televote, two from each of the last five decades. In subsequent years, a panel of more than 60 journalists and music industry executives decided the people and groups to be inducted. The ceremony was last held in 2006, and has since been cancelled.

== 2004 inductees ==
There were five founding members, one from each decade from the 1950s to 1990s:

- Elvis Presley
- The Beatles
- Bob Marley
- Madonna
- U2

In addition, the public were asked to select one further act from each decade, from five lists of ten nominees. The five members chosen by the public in October 2004 were:

- Cliff Richard and the Shadows
- The Rolling Stones
- Queen
- Michael Jackson
- Robbie Williams

The full list of nominees were:

- 1950s - Billie Holiday, Buddy Holly, Chuck Berry, Cliff Richard and the Shadows, Ella Fitzgerald, Frank Sinatra, Johnny Cash, Little Richard, Louis Armstrong, Miles Davis
- 1960s - The Beach Boys, Aretha Franklin, Bob Dylan, the Supremes, the Rolling Stones, James Brown, Jimi Hendrix, the Kinks, Simon and Garfunkel, the Velvet Underground
- 1970s - Pink Floyd, ABBA, the Bee Gees, the Clash, David Bowie, Elton John, Led Zeppelin, Queen, the Sex Pistols, Stevie Wonder
- 1980s - Bruce Springsteen, Beastie Boys, George Michael, Guns N' Roses, Joy Division, Michael Jackson, Prince, Public Enemy, R.E.M., the Smiths
- 1990s - Blur, Dr. Dre, Missy Elliott, Nirvana, Oasis, the Prodigy, Radiohead, the Red Hot Chili Peppers, Robbie Williams, the Spice Girls

Chris Blackwell, the founder of Island Records, was awarded honorary membership.

== 2005 inductees ==
The 2005 inductees were selected by a panel of 60 people from the music industry:

- Pink Floyd (inducted by Pete Townshend of the Who)
- Eurythmics (inducted by Bob Geldof, performed)
- Aretha Franklin
- Jimi Hendrix (inducted by Mitch Mitchell, and Slash of hard rock band Guns N' Roses and supergroup Velvet Revolver)
- Bob Dylan (inducted by Woody Harrelson)
- Joy Division/New Order (inducted by actor John Simm, performed "Regret" and "Love Will Tear Us Apart")
- The Who (inducted by Ray Davies of the Kinks)
- The Kinks (inducted by footballer Geoff Hurst)
- Black Sabbath (inducted by Brian May of Queen, performed)
- Ozzy Osbourne solo (inducted by Angus Young of AC/DC)

The late DJ John Peel was also made an honorary member (inducted by Damon Albarn of Blur).

The programme was televised in the UK. It was later shown on VH1 in the United States, without the Joy Division/New Order segments. The full version was subsequently shown on VH1 Classic.

== 2006 inductees ==
The 2006 inductees were:

- James Brown (inducted by Jazzie B, performed "I Got You (I Feel Good)")
- Led Zeppelin (inducted by Roger Taylor of Queen, Wolfmother performed "Communication Breakdown" as tribute)
- Rod Stewart (inducted by James Morrison who performed "The First Cut Is the Deepest" / "Do Ya Think I'm Sexy")
- Brian Wilson (inducted by David Gilmour of Pink Floyd, performed "God Only Knows" and "Good Vibrations")
- Bon Jovi (inducted by David A. Stewart and Kara DioGuardi, performed "Livin' on a Prayer", "Wanted Dead or Alive" and "It's My Life")
- Prince (inducted by Beyoncé)
- Dusty Springfield (inducted by Joss Stone who performed "Son of a Preacher Man")

George Martin received an honorary membership (inducted by the then British Chancellor of the Exchequer and future Prime Minister Gordon Brown). He then went on to conduct a special arrangement of the Beatles songs "Golden Slumbers" / "Carry That Weight" / "The End"; with the help of Johnny Borrell, Corinne Bailey Rae, José González, Roger Taylor and the London Community Gospel Choir. The band were also joined by Dean Tidey who at the time was a touring musician with Feeder. That band although never a member of this particular Hall of Fame, were nonetheless later inducted into the Kerrang Radio Hall of Fame in August 2019.

Also present at the ceremony were Patti LaBelle (performed "You Don't Have to Say You Love Me"), Nona Hendryx, Tony Iommi (Black Sabbath), Wolfmother, Jimmy Page (Led Zeppelin), Mark Hudson, Lemar, Trevor Nelson, Trevor Francis, Giles Martin, Dermot O'Leary (host), and Paul Gambaccini.

Prince, during his induction, invited everyone over to see him live in Las Vegas but gave an apology that he could not perform live at the venue. Rod Stewart appeared live by satellite from Los Angeles in a Celtic shirt and accidentally dropped his award, before advising James Morrison to 'give up the fags'.

The event has particular significance as it turned out to be James Brown's final televised recording, as he died on 25 December 2006.

The 2006 Induction Ceremony took place on 14 November 2006 at Alexandra Palace, and it was broadcast on Channel 4 in the UK on 16 November, repeated on 18 November. It was shown on VH1 in the USA on 25 November.

== Cancellation ==
There were no inductees in 2007. It was announced in September 2008 that Channel 4 had axed the ceremony, partly due to lack of funding, and also because a two-year gap since the last show was "too long".
