= Homegoing =

Traditional African-American Christian funeral service

African-American funeral in May 1941, by Jack Delano

A homegoing (or home-going) service is an African-American and Black-Canadian Christian funeral tradition marking the going home of the deceased to the Lord or to Heaven.

== History ==
In 1803, a slave ship landed in St. Simons Island, Georgia, with captive Africans from Nigeria carrying a cargo of Igbo people. The Igbo people took control of the slave vessel, and when it landed in Georgia many of the Igbos chose suicide than a lifetime in slavery by drowning in the swamp. African Americans in Georgia and in the Gullah Geechee Nation says that when the Igbo people died from suicide their souls flew back to Africa. The location became known as Igbo landing. Also in the Gullah Geechee Nation, the practice of placing seashells on graves is believed to return souls back to Africa, as the sea brought Africans to America on slave ships and the sea will return them back home in Africa when they die. Enslaved and free blacks were not allowed to congregate to perform any kind of ritual for burying their dead because slaveholders feared the slaves would conspire to create an uprising during any such gathering.

At the beginning of the twentieth century, there were few, if any black-owned or black-managed funeral homes. Survivors of deceased blacks were forced to depend on white funeral homes for embalming if they would even agree to service them. Jim Crow laws and white bias required blacks to enter these white funeral homes through back doors and basements.
