= Aretha Franklin =

American soul singer (1942–2018)

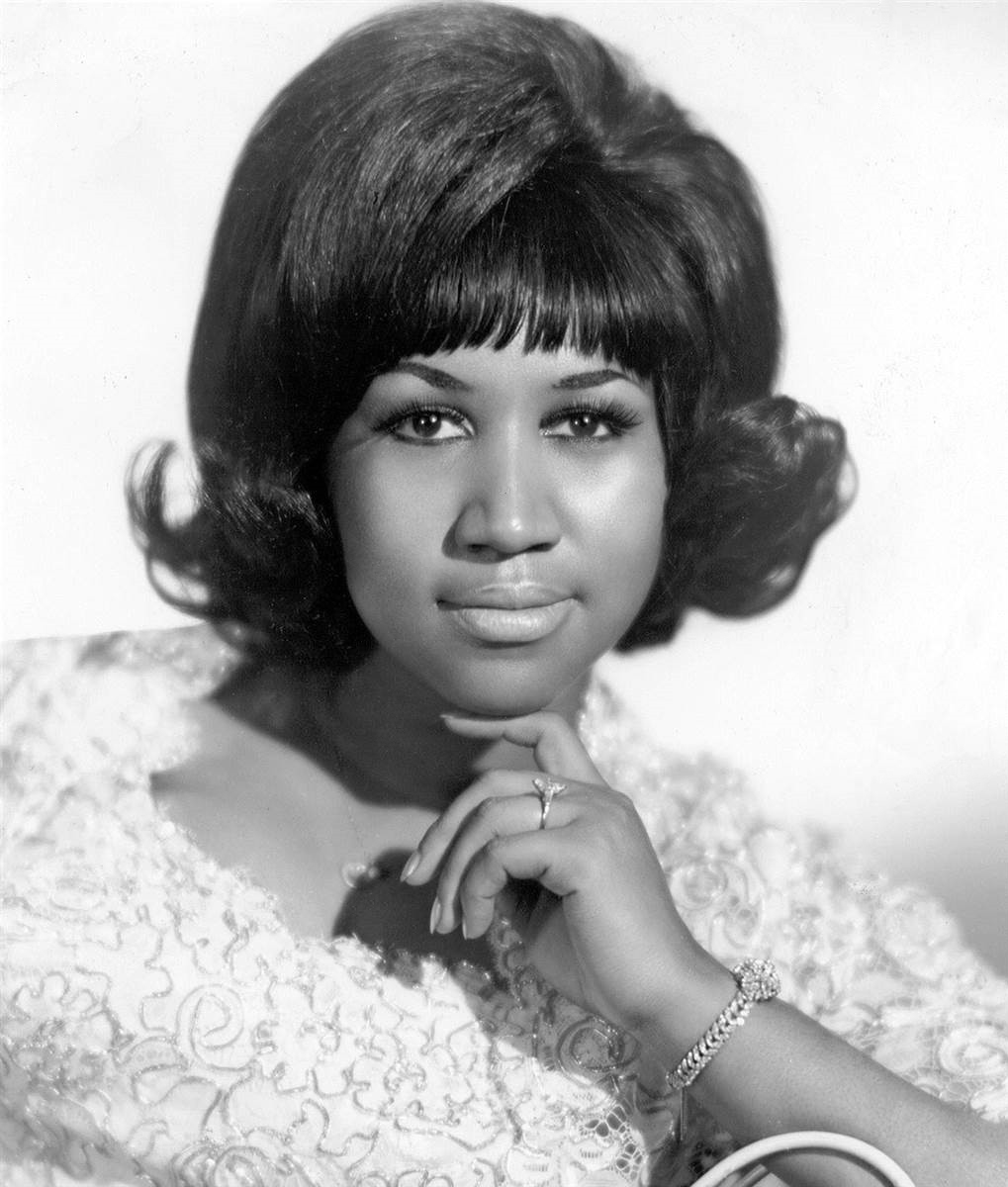
- Franklin in 1968
- Born: Aretha Louise Franklin; March 25, 1942; Memphis, Tennessee, U.S.
- Died: August 16, 2018 (aged 76); Detroit, Michigan, U.S.
- Resting place: Woodlawn Cemetery, Detroit, Michigan
- Occupations: Singer-songwriter; pianist; record producer; civil rights activist
- Years active: 1954–2017
- Spouses: Ted White (m. 1961; div. 1969); Glynn Turman (m. 1978; div. 1984)
- Children: 4
- Parents: C. L. Franklin (father); Barbara Siggers Franklin (mother)
- Relatives: Erma Franklin (sister); Carolyn Franklin (sister)
- Awards: Full list
- Musical career
- Origin: Detroit, Michigan, U.S.
- Genres: Soul; R&B; pop; gospel
- Instruments: Vocals; piano
- Works: Discography
- Labels: J.V.B; Columbia; Atlantic; Arista; RCA
- Website: arethafranklin.net

Aretha Louise Franklin (/əˈriːθə/ ə-REE-thə; March 25, 1942 – August 16, 2018) was an American singer-songwriter and pianist. Regarded as the "Queen of Soul", she was twice named by Rolling Stone magazine as the greatest singer of all time.

As a child, Franklin was noticed for her gospel singing at New Bethel Baptist Church in Detroit, Michigan, where her father, C. L. Franklin, was a minister. At the age of 18 she was signed as a recording artist for Columbia Records. While her career did not immediately flourish, Franklin found acclaim and commercial success after signing with Atlantic Records in 1966. There she recorded significant hit albums such as I Never Loved a Man the Way I Love You, Lady Soul and Aretha Now in the late 1960s and Young, Gifted and Black, Amazing Grace and Sparkle in the 1970s, before experiencing problems with the record company. Franklin left Atlantic in 1979 and signed with Arista Records, where her career was revived with the hit albums Jump to It, Who's Zoomin' Who?, Aretha and A Rose Is Still a Rose.

Franklin is one of the best-selling music artists, with more than 75 million records sold worldwide. She had 112 singles on the US Billboard charts, including 73 Hot 100 entries, 17 top-ten pop singles, 96 R&B entries and 20 number-one R&B singles. Although her rendition of "Respect" has been referred to as her signature song, Franklin is known for other hit singles such as "(You Make Me Feel Like) A Natural Woman", "Chain of Fools", "Think", "I Say a Little Prayer", "Rock Steady", "Day Dreaming", "Freeway of Love" and "I Knew You Were Waiting (For Me)" (a duet with George Michael). She also made a featured appearance in the 1980 musical-comedy film The Blues Brothers.

Franklin received numerous honors throughout her career. She won 18 Grammy Awards out of 44 nominations, including the first eight awards given for Best Female R&B Vocal Performance (1968–1975), as well as a Grammy Living Legend Award and Lifetime Achievement Award. She was also awarded the National Medal of Arts and the Presidential Medal of Freedom. In 1987, she became the first female artist to be inducted into the Rock and Roll Hall of Fame. Her other inductions include the UK Music Hall of Fame in 2005, the Gospel Music Hall of Fame in 2012, and posthumously the National Women's Hall of Fame in 2020 and the Volunteer State Music Hall of Fame in 2026. In 2019, the Pulitzer Prize jury awarded her a posthumous special citation "for her indelible contribution to American music and culture for more than five decades".

== Early life ==
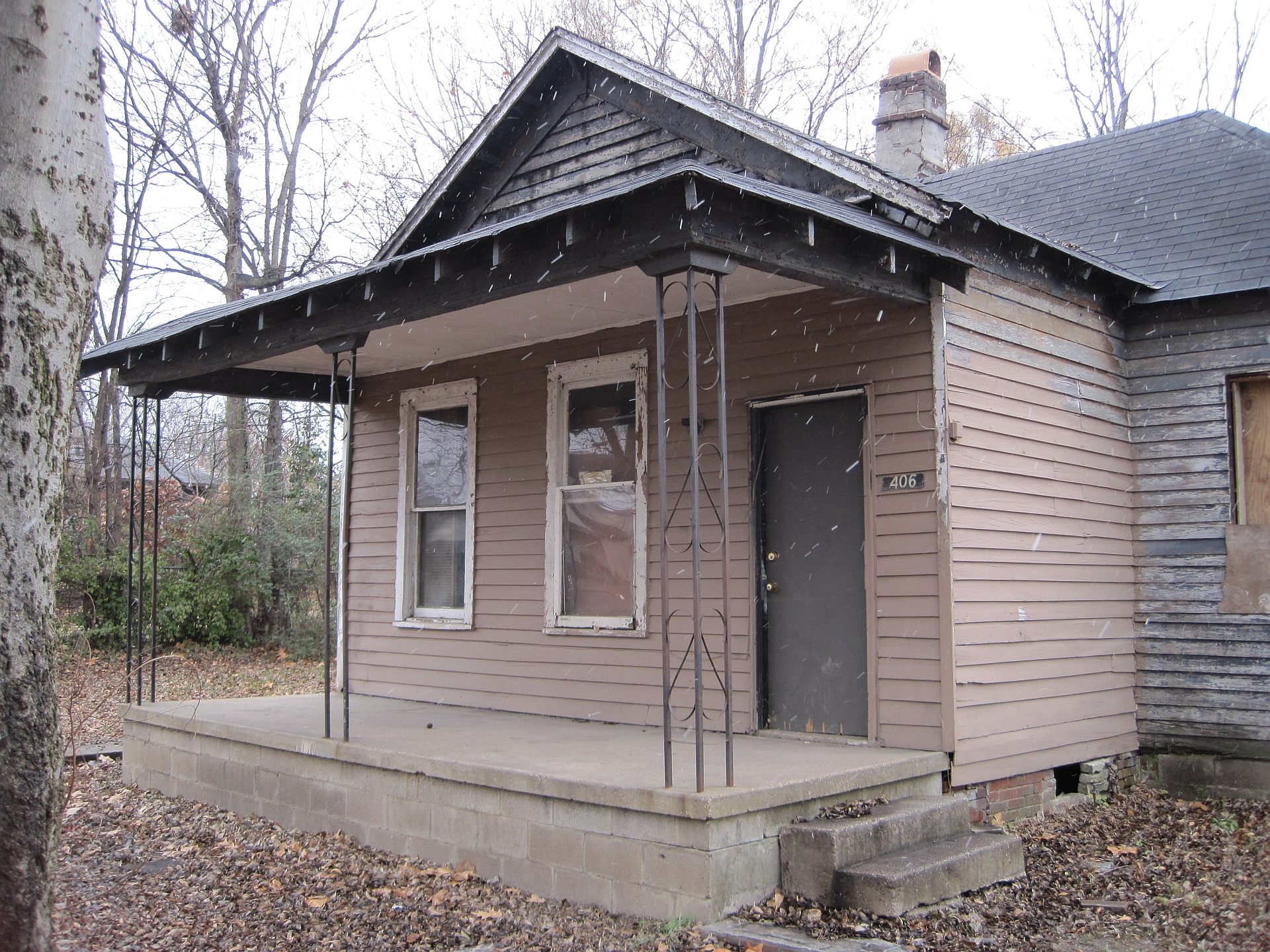
Franklin's birthplace, 406 Lucy Avenue, Memphis, Tennessee

Aretha Louise Franklin was born on March 25, 1942, to Barbara (née Siggers) and Clarence LaVaughn "C. L." Franklin. She was delivered at her family's home at 406 Lucy Avenue, Memphis, Tennessee. Her father was a Baptist minister and circuit preacher originally from Shelby, Mississippi, and her mother was an accomplished piano player and vocalist. C. L. and Barbara Franklin both had children from prior relationships in addition to the four children they had together. When Aretha was two years old, the family moved to Buffalo, New York. By the time Aretha was five C. L. Franklin had permanently moved the family to Detroit, Michigan, where he took over the pastorship of the New Bethel Baptist Church.

The Franklins had a troubled marriage because of C. L. Franklin's infidelities, and they separated in 1948. At that time Barbara Franklin returned to Buffalo with Aretha's half-brother, Vaughn. After the separation, Aretha recalled seeing her mother in Buffalo during the summer, and Barbara Franklin frequently visited her children in Detroit. Aretha's mother died of a heart attack on March 7, 1952, before Aretha's 10th birthday. Several women, including Aretha's grandmother Rachel and Mahalia Jackson, took turns helping with the children at the Franklin home. During this time Aretha learned how to play piano by ear. She also attended public school in Detroit, going through her first year at Northern High School but dropping out during her second year.

Aretha gave birth to her first child, Clarence, when she was only 12 years old. She originally claimed that the father was a schoolmate named Donald Burke but one of her handwritten wills, discovered in 2019, revealed that the father was Edward Jordan Sr., who was 12–13 years older than her.

Aretha's father's emotionally driven sermons resulted in his being known as the man with the "million-dollar voice". He earned thousands of dollars for sermons in various churches across the country. His fame led to his home being visited by various celebrities. Among the visitors were gospel musicians Clara Ward, James Cleveland and early Caravans members Albertina Walker and Inez Andrews. Martin Luther King Jr, Jackie Wilson and Sam Cooke all became friends of C. L. Franklin. Ward was romantically involved with Aretha's father from around 1949 until Ward's death in 1973, though Aretha "preferred to view them strictly as friends". Ward also served as a role model to the young Aretha.

== Musical career ==
=== 1952–1960: Beginnings ===
Just after her mother's death, Franklin began singing solos at New Bethel Baptist Church, debuting with the hymn "Jesus, Be a Fence Around Me". When Franklin was 12, her father began managing her; he would take her on the road with him, during his "gospel caravan" tours for her to perform in various churches. He also helped her sign her first recording deal with J.V.B. Records. Franklin was featured on vocals and piano. In 1956, J.V.B. released Franklin's first single, "Never Grow Old", backed with "You Grow Closer". "Precious Lord (Part One)" backed with "Precious Lord (Part Two)" followed in 1959. These four tracks, with the addition of "There Is a Fountain Filled with Blood", were released on side one of the 1956 album, Spirituals. This was reissued by Battle Records in 1962, under the same title. In 1965, Checker Records released Songs of Faith, featuring the five tracks from the 1956 Spirituals album, with the addition of four previously unreleased recordings. Aretha was only 14 when Songs of Faith was recorded.

During this time, Franklin would occasionally travel with the Soul Stirrers. As a young gospel singer, Franklin spent summers on the gospel circuit in Chicago and stayed with Mavis Staples's family. According to music producer Quincy Jones, while Franklin was still young, Dinah Washington let him know that "Aretha was the 'next one'". Franklin and her father traveled to California, where she met singer Sam Cooke. Cooke and Ray Charles were "two of Franklin's greatest influences". Also important was James Cleveland, known as the King of Gospel music, "who helped to focus her early career as a gospel singer"; Cleveland had been recruited by her father as a pianist for the Southern California Community Choir. At the age of 16, Franklin went on tour with Dr. Martin Luther King Jr., and she would ultimately sing at his funeral in 1968.

=== 1960–1966: Columbia years ===
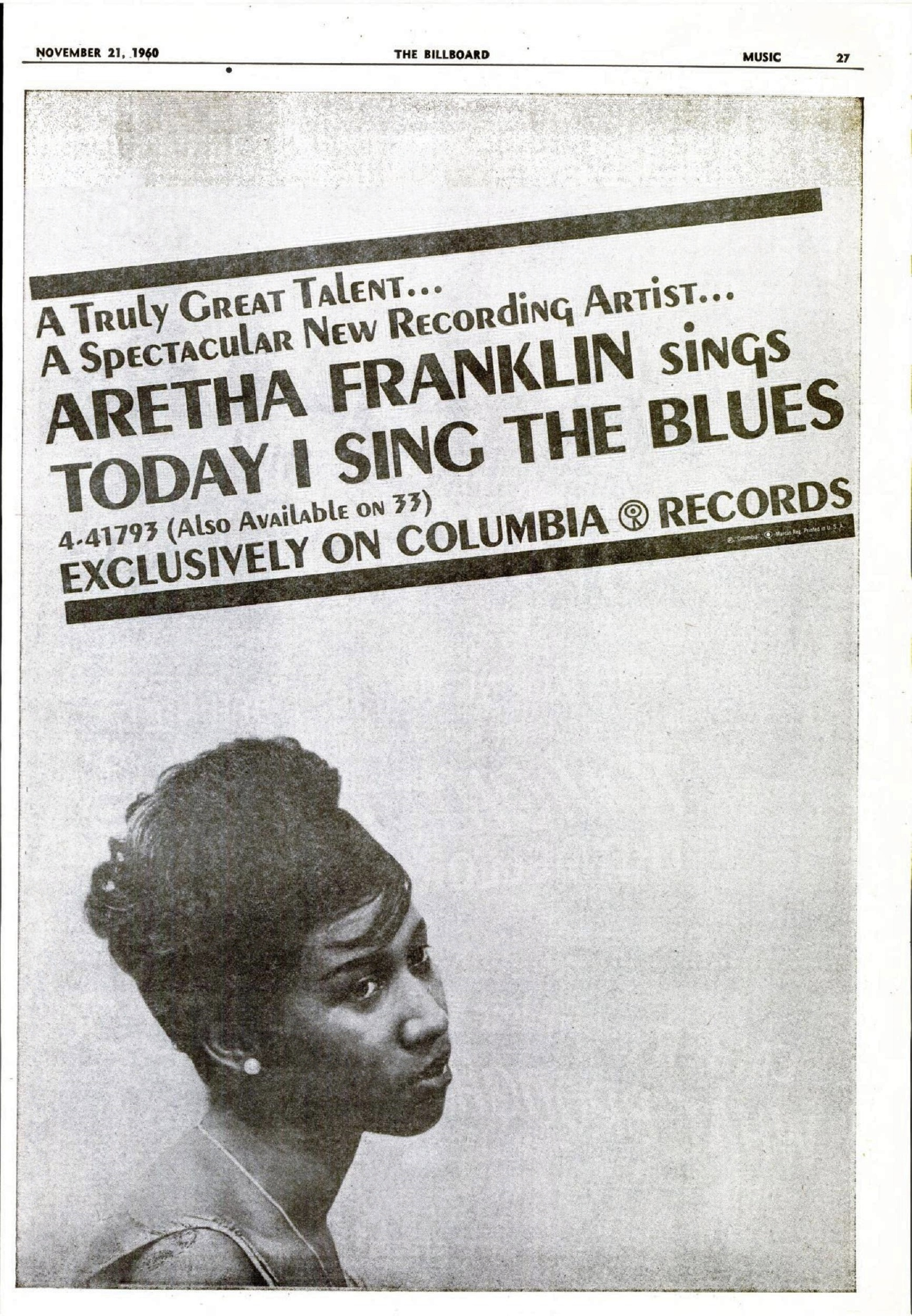
Billboard ad for Franklin's debut single, "Today I Sing the Blues", November 21, 1960

After turning 18, Franklin confided to her father that she aspired to follow Sam Cooke in recording pop music, and moved to New York. Serving as her manager, C. L. Franklin agreed to the move and helped to produce a two-song demo that soon was brought to the attention of Columbia Records, who agreed to sign her in 1960, as a "five-percent artist". During this period, Franklin would be coached by choreographer Cholly Atkins to prepare for her pop performances. Before signing with Columbia, Sam Cooke tried to persuade Franklin's father to sign her with his label, RCA Victor, but she had already decided to go with Columbia. Berry Gordy had also asked Franklin and her elder sister Erma to sign with his Tamla label, but C. L. Franklin turned Gordy down, as he felt Tamla was not yet an established label. Franklin's first Columbia single, "Today I Sing the Blues", was issued in September 1960 and later reached the top 10 of the Hot R&B Sides chart.

In January 1961, Columbia issued Franklin's first album, Aretha: With The Ray Bryant Combo. The album featured her first single to chart the Billboard Hot 100, "Won't Be Long", which also peaked at number 7 on the R&B chart. Mostly produced by Clyde Otis, Franklin's Columbia recordings saw her performing in diverse genres, such as standards, vocal jazz, blues, doo-wop and rhythm and blues. Before the year was out, Franklin scored her first hit-single with her rendition of the standard "Rock-a-Bye Your Baby with a Dixie Melody". By the end of 1961, Franklin was named as a "new-star female vocalist" in DownBeat magazine. In 1962, Columbia issued two more albums, The Electrifying Aretha Franklin and The Tender, the Moving, the Swinging Aretha Franklin, the latter of which became her first charting album, reaching number 69 on the Billboard Top LPs – Monaural chart.

In the 1960s, during a performance at the Regal Theater in Chicago, WVON radio personality Pervis Spann announced that Franklin should be crowned "the Queen of Soul". Spann ceremonially placed a crown on her head. By 1964, Franklin began recording more pop music, reaching the top 10 on the R&B chart with the ballad "Runnin' Out of Fools", in early 1965. She had two R&B charted singles in 1965 and 1966, with the songs "One Step Ahead" and "Cry Like a Baby", while also reaching the Easy Listening charts with the ballads "You Made Me Love You" and "(No, No) I'm Losing You". By the mid-1960s, Franklin was making $100,000 per year from countless nightclub and theater performances. Also during that period, she appeared on rock-and-roll shows, such as Hollywood a Go-Go and Shindig! However, she struggled with commercial success while at Columbia. Label executive John H. Hammond later said he felt Columbia did not understand Franklin's early gospel background and failed to bring that aspect out further during her period there.

=== 1966–1979: Atlantic years ===
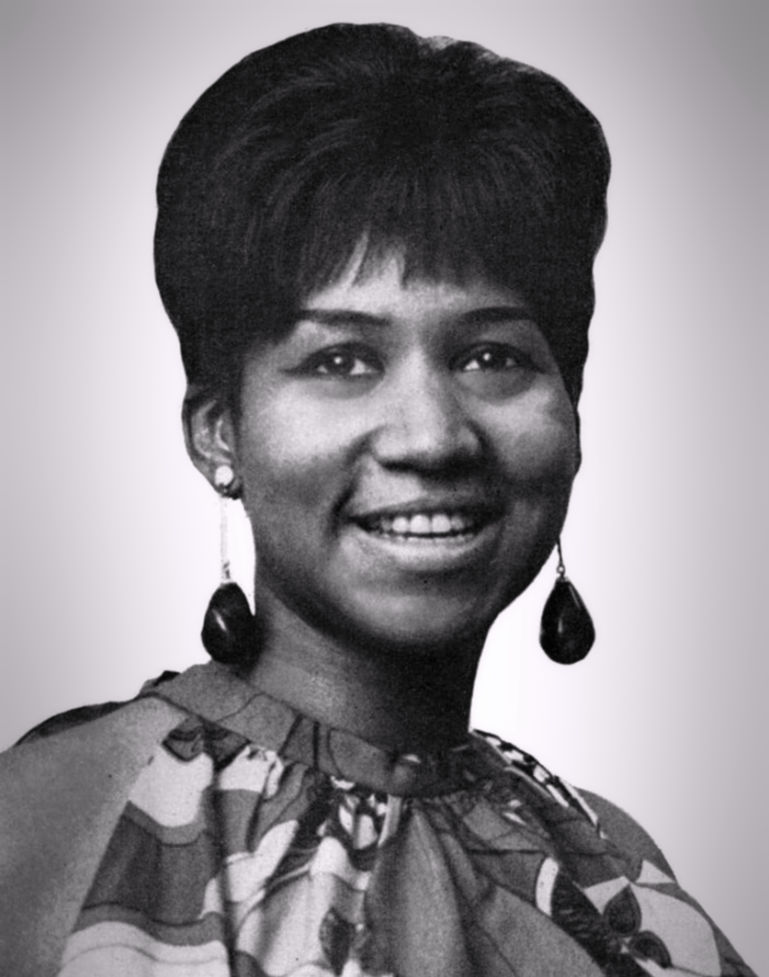
Franklin in 1967

In November 1966, Franklin's Columbia recording contract expired; at that time, she owed the company money because record sales had not met expectations. Producer Jerry Wexler convinced her to move to Atlantic Records. Wexler decided that he wanted to take advantage of her gospel background; his philosophy in general was to encourage a "tenacious form of rhythm & blues that became increasingly identified as soul". The Atlantic days would lead to a series of hits for Aretha Franklin between 1967 and early 1972; her rapport with Wexler helped in the creation of the majority of her peak recordings on the Atlantic label. The next seven years' achievements were less impressive. However, according to Rolling Stone, "they weren't as terrible as some claimed, they were pro forma and never reached for new heights".

In January 1967, Franklin traveled to Muscle Shoals, Alabama, to record at FAME Studios and recorded the song "I Never Loved a Man (The Way I Love You)", backed by the Muscle Shoals Rhythm Section. Franklin only spent one day recording at FAME, as an altercation broke out between her manager and husband Ted White, studio owner Rick Hall, and a horn player, and sessions were abandoned. The song was released the following month and reached number one on the R&B chart, while also peaking at number nine on the Billboard Hot 100, giving Franklin her first top-ten pop single. The song's B-side, "Do Right Woman, Do Right Man", reached the R&B top 40, peaking at number 37. "Respect" was Otis Redding's song but Aretha modified it with a "supercharged interlude featuring the emphatic spelling-out of the song's title". Her frenetic version was released in April and reached number one on both the R&B and pop charts. "Respect" became her signature song and was later hailed as a civil rights and feminist anthem. Upon hearing her version, Otis Redding said admiringly: "That little girl done took my song away from me." Franklin's debut Atlantic album, I Never Loved a Man the Way I Love You, also became commercially successful, later going gold. According to National Geographic, this recording "would catapult Franklin to fame". Franklin scored two additional top-ten singles in 1967: "Baby I Love You" and "(You Make Me Feel Like) A Natural Woman".

Working with Wexler and Atlantic, Franklin had become "the most successful singer in the nation" by 1968. In 1968, Franklin issued the top-selling albums Lady Soul and Aretha Now, which included some of her most popular hit singles, including "Chain of Fools", "Ain't No Way", "Think", and "I Say a Little Prayer". That February, Franklin earned the first two of her Grammys, including the debut category for Best Female R&B Vocal Performance. On February 16, Franklin was honored with a day named for her and was greeted by longtime friend Martin Luther King Jr., who gave her the SCLC Drum Beat Award for Musicians less than two months before his death. Franklin toured outside the US for the first time in late April/May 1968, including an appearance at the Concertgebouw, Amsterdam, where she played to a near-hysterical audience who covered the stage with flower petals. She performed two concerts in London, at the Finsbury Park Astoria and the Hammersmith Odeon on May 11 and 12. In June 1968, she appeared on the cover of Time magazine in a portrait illustration by Boris Chaliapin.

"Respect"
"Respect" was a huge hit for Franklin, and became a signature song for her.

In March 1969, Franklin was unanimously voted winner of Académie du Jazz's R&B award, Prix Otis Redding, for her albums Lady Soul, Aretha Now, and Aretha in Paris. That year, Franklin was the subject of a criminal impersonation scheme. Another woman performed at several Florida venues under the name Aretha Franklin. Suspicion was drawn when the fake Franklin charged only a fraction of the expected rate to perform. Franklin's lawyers contacted Florida authorities and uncovered a coercive scheme in which the singer, Vickie Jones, had been threatened with violence and constrained into impersonating her idol, whom she resembled closely both in voice and looks. After being cleared of wrongdoing, Jones subsequently enjoyed a brief career of her own, during which she was herself the subject of an impersonation.

Franklin's success further expanded during the early 1970s, during which she recorded the multi-week R&B number one "Don't Play That Song (You Lied)", as well as the top-ten singles "Spanish Harlem", "Rock Steady", and "Day Dreaming". Some of these releases were from the acclaimed albums Spirit in the Dark (released in August 1970, in which month she again performed at London's Hammersmith Odeon) and Young, Gifted and Black (released in early 1972). In 1971, Franklin became the first R&B performer to headline Fillmore West, later that year releasing the live album Aretha Live at Fillmore West.

In January 1972, she returned to gospel music in a two-night, live-church recording, with the album Amazing Grace, in which she reinterpreted standards such as Mahalia Jackson's "How I Got Over". Originally released in June 1972, Amazing Grace sold more than two million copies, and is one of bestselling gospel albums of all time. The live performances were filmed for a concert film directed by Sydney Pollack, but because of synching problems and Franklin's own attempts to prevent the film's distribution, the film's release was only realized by producer Alan Elliott in November 2018.

Franklin's career began to experience problems while recording the album Hey Now Hey, which featured production from Quincy Jones. Despite the success of the single "Angel", the album bombed upon its release in 1973. Franklin continued having R&B success with songs such as "Until You Come Back to Me" and "I'm in Love", but by 1975 her albums and songs were no longer top sellers. After Jerry Wexler left Atlantic for Warner Bros. Records in 1976, Franklin worked on the soundtrack to the film Sparkle with Curtis Mayfield. The album yielded Franklin's final top 40 pop hit of the decade, "Something He Can Feel", which also peaked at number one on the R&B chart. Franklin's follow-up albums for Atlantic, including Sweet Passion (1977), Almighty Fire (1978) and La Diva (1979), bombed on the charts, and in 1979 Franklin left the company. On November 7, 1979, she guested The Mike Douglas Show with her yellow costume from her La Diva album, and sang "Ladies Only", "What If I Should Ever Need You" and "Yesterday" by the Beatles.

=== 1980–2007: Arista years ===
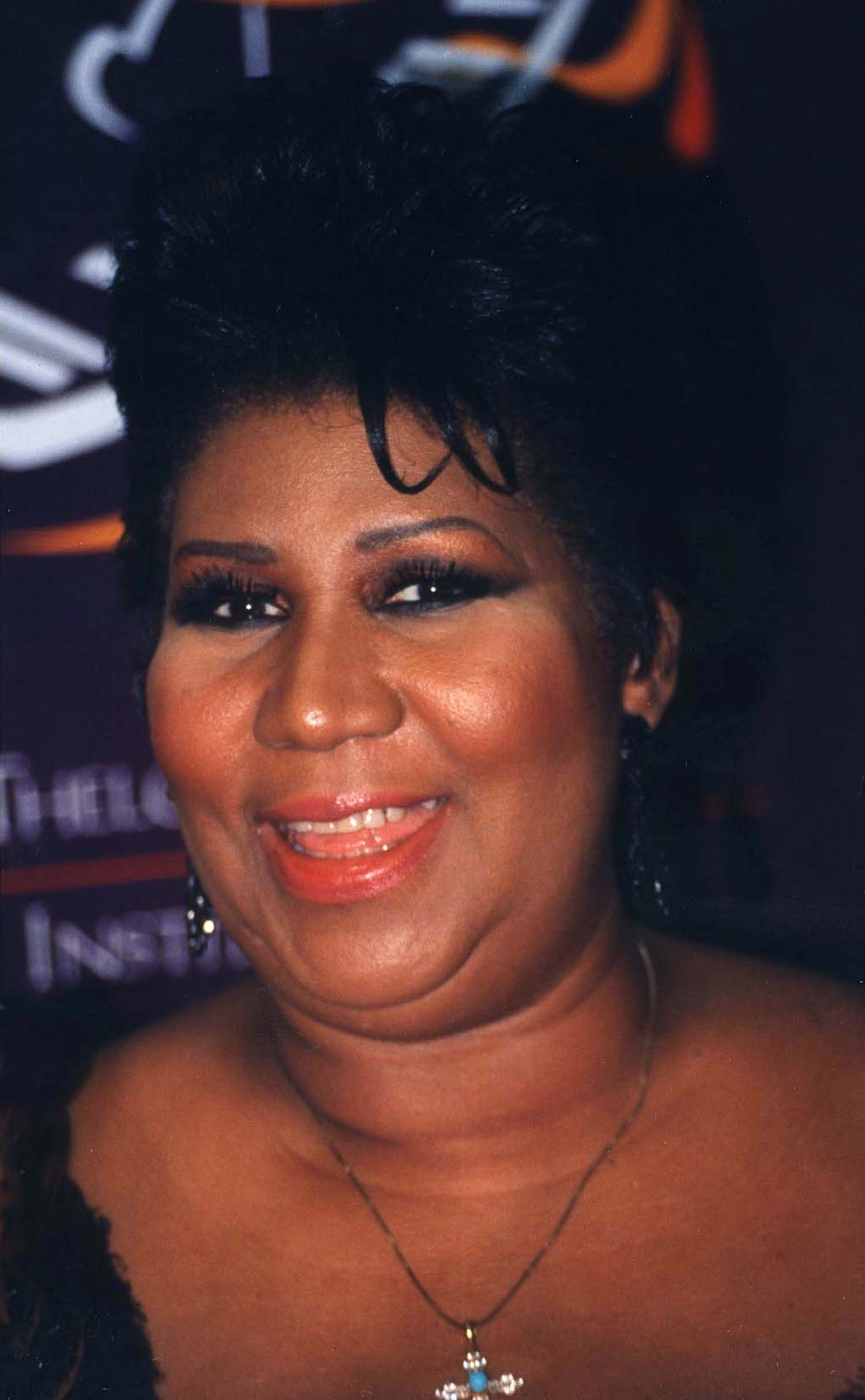
Franklin in 1998

In 1980, after leaving Atlantic Records, Franklin signed with Clive Davis's Arista Records. "Davis was beguiling and had the golden touch", according to Rolling Stone. "If anybody could rejuvenate Franklin's puzzlingly stuck career, it was Davis." Franklin participated in the musical comedy film, The Blues Brothers, in a cameo guest role as a soul food restaurant proprietor and wife of Matt "Guitar" Murphy. In November of that year, Franklin participated in the Royal Variety Performance at the London Palladium in front of Queen Elizabeth The Queen Mother, directed by Louis Benjamin in celebration of fifty years of entertainment.

Franklin's first Arista release, Aretha, was released in 1980 and produced the top three R&B hit single "United Together". While not released as a single, Franklin's funk-influenced cover of Otis Redding's "I Can't Turn You Loose" on the same album resulted in her first Grammy nomination in four years.

The follow-up album, Love All the Hurt Away (1981) featured her hit R&B duet of the title track with George Benson, while a post-disco rendition of Sam & Dave's "Hold On, I'm Comin'" won Franklin her first Grammy in six years.

For her next Arista release, Clive Davis hired rising soul singer Luther Vandross to produce, resulting in Jump to It (1982). Producing her first top 40 single on the Billboard Hot 100 since "Something He Can Feel" with the danceable title track", the album would become her first since the Sparkle soundtrack seven years earlier to receive a gold certification from the RIAA.

When her immediate Vandross-helmed follow-up, Get It Right (1983), failed to perform successfully despite the title track becoming a number one R&B single, Arista hired a young Narada Michael Walden to produce the album, Who's Zoomin' Who.

Eschewing her R&B and soul roots, the album brought on a crossover pop sound with elements of synthesized dance-rock and urban pop. Featuring the top ten Hot 100 hits such as "Freeway of Love" and the title track, the album peaked at number thirteen on the Billboard 200, her highest peak in nearly 20 years and was her first album to be certified platinum in the United States. Part of the album's success was due to exposure on the then-fledgling music video channel MTV, which also exposed Franklin to a younger audience. Franklin also achieved a top 20 hit with the duet, "Sisters Are Doing It for Themselves" with the new wave band Eurythmics.

On October 27, 1986, Franklin issued her sixth Arista release, Aretha (sometimes referred to as Aretha '86). The Walden-produced album went gold on the strength of her globally successful duet with George Michael, "I Knew You Were Waiting (For Me)", which became her first single in nearly twenty years to top the Billboard Hot 100 and also topped the charts in the United Kingdom and Australia and resulted in Grammy wins for Franklin. Other hit singles on Aretha included a pop-rock rendition of "Jumpin' Jack Flash", culled from the Whoopi Goldberg-starring film of the same name, and "Jimmy Lee".

Throughout 1987, Franklin provided vocals to the theme songs of the TV shows A Different World and Together. Also in 1987, the artist performed "America the Beautiful" at WWE's Wrestlemania III; one source states that "to this day her WrestleMania III performance might be the most memorable" of the event openers by many artists. That same year, Franklin released her second full-length gospel album, One Lord, One Faith, One Baptism, which was recorded at her late father's New Bethel church.

After 1988, "Franklin never again had huge hits", according to Rolling Stone. In 1989, Franklin reunited with Narada Michael Walden on the album Through the Storm. Despite the appearances of Elton John and fellow label mate and "honorary niece" Whitney Houston, the album sold poorly, as did her 1991 follow-up, What You See is What You Sweat. Both albums attempted to bring Franklin to the new jack swing era but were critical failures as well.

Franklin returned to the charts in 1993 with the house song "A Deeper Love", which was featured on the soundtrack to Sister Act 2: Back in the Habit and topped the Billboard Dance Club Play chart and was a UK top five hit. A year later, Franklin began working with Babyface, landing her first top 40 single in five years with the R&B ballad, "Willing to Forgive".

In 1995, Franklin portrayed Aunt Em in the Apollo Theater revival of The Wiz. That year, Franklin contributed to the soundtrack of Waiting to Exhale, after being handpicked by Whitney Houston to perform the ballad "It Hurts Like Hell", which reached the Billboard R&B charts.

Three years after that, Franklin released the album, A Rose Is Still a Rose, which produced her final top 40 single with the title track, with both the album and single earning gold certifications.

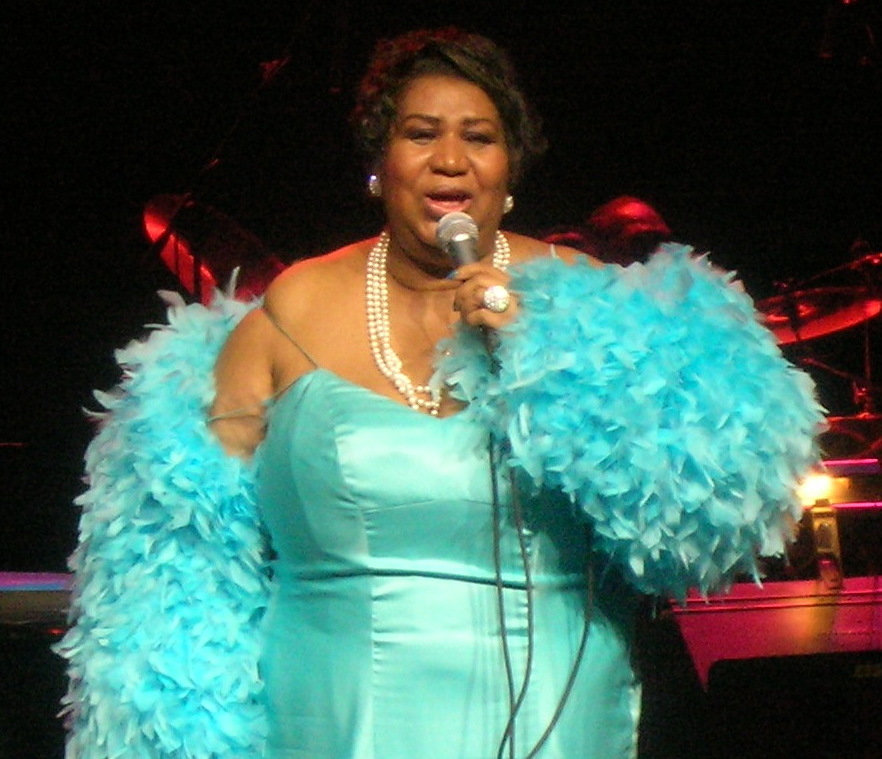
Franklin performing in April 2007 at the Nokia Theater in Dallas, Texas

That same year, Franklin received global praise after her 1998 Grammy Awards performance. She had initially been asked to perform in honor of the 1980 film The Blues Brothers, in which she appeared with Dan Aykroyd and John Belushi. That evening, after the show had already begun, another performer, opera tenor Luciano Pavarotti became too ill to perform the aria "Nessun dorma" as planned. The show's producers, desperate to fill the time slot, approached Franklin with their dilemma. She was a friend of Pavarotti and had sung the aria two nights prior at the annual MusiCares event. She asked to hear Pavarotti's rehearsal recording, and after listening, agreed that she could sing it in the tenor range that the orchestra was prepared to play in. More than one billion people worldwide saw the performance, and she received an immediate standing ovation.

She would go on to record the selection and perform it live several more times in the years to come. The last time she sang the aria live was for Pope Francis at the World Meeting of Families in Philadelphia in September 2015. A small boy was so touched by her performance that he came onto the stage and embraced her while Franklin was still singing.

Her final Arista album, So Damn Happy, was released in 2003 and featured the Grammy-winning song "Wonderful". In 2004, Franklin announced that she was leaving Arista after more than 20 years with the label.

To complete her Arista obligations, Franklin issued the duets compilation album Jewels in the Crown: All-Star Duets with the Queen in 2007. In February 2006, she performed "The Star-Spangled Banner" with Aaron Neville and Dr. John for Super Bowl XL, held in her hometown of Detroit.

In 2007, Franklin would perform America the Beautiful at WrestleMania 23, 20 years since her performance at WrestleMania 3, where she was specifically chosen to reflect the events "all grown up" theme and tagline.

=== 2007–2018: Final years ===
In 2008, Franklin issued the holiday album This Christmas, Aretha on DMI Records. On February 8, 2008, Franklin was honored as the MusiCares Person of the Year, and performed "Never Gonna Break My Faith", which had won her the Grammy for best gospel performance the year before. Twelve years later, an unheard performance of "Never Gonna Break My Faith" was released in June 2020 to commemorate Juneteenth with a new video visualizing the American human rights movement. This caused the song to enter the Billboard gospel charts at number one, giving Franklin the distinction of having had a number one record in every decade since the 1960s. On November 18, 2008, she performed "Respect" and "Chain of Fools" at Dancing with the Stars.

On January 20, 2009, Franklin made international headlines for performing "My Country, 'Tis of Thee" at President Barack Obama's inaugural ceremony with her church hat becoming a popular topic online. In 2010, Franklin accepted an honorary degree from Yale University. In 2011, under her own label, Aretha's Records, she issued the album Aretha: A Woman Falling Out of Love.

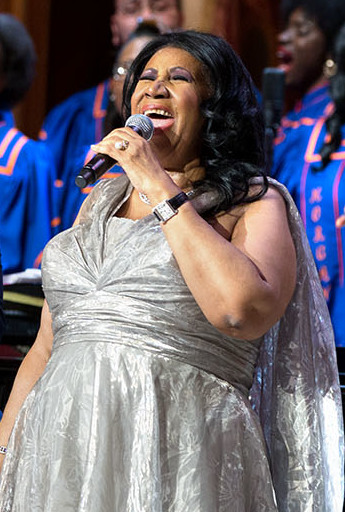
Franklin performs in the East Room of the White House in 2015

In 2014, Franklin was signed under RCA Records, controller of the Arista catalog and a sister label to Columbia via Sony Music Entertainment, and worked with Clive Davis. There were plans for her to record an album produced by Danger Mouse, who was replaced with Babyface and Don Was when Danger Mouse left the project. On September 29, 2014, Franklin performed to a standing ovation, with Cissy Houston as backup, a compilation of Adele's "Rolling in the Deep" and "Ain't No Mountain High Enough" on the Late Show with David Letterman. Franklin's cover of "Rolling in the Deep" was featured among nine other songs in her first RCA release, Aretha Franklin Sings the Great Diva Classics, released in October 2014. In doing so, she became the first woman to have 100 songs on Billboard's Hot R&B/Hip-Hop Songs chart with the success of her cover of Adele's "Rolling in the Deep", which debuted at number 47 on the chart.

In December 2015, Franklin gave an acclaimed performance of "(You Make Me Feel Like) A Natural Woman" at the 2015 Kennedy Center Honors during the section for honoree Carole King, who co-wrote the song. During the swelling bridge of the song, Franklin dramatically dropped her fur coat from her shoulders to the stage, for which the audience rewarded her with a mid-performance standing ovation. Dropping the coat was symbolic according to Rolling Stone: it "echoed back to those times when gospel queens would toss their furs on top of the coffins of other gospel queens — a gesture that honored the dead but castigated death itself".

She returned to Detroit's Ford Field on Thanksgiving Day 2016 to once again perform the national anthem before the game between the Minnesota Vikings and Detroit Lions. Seated behind the piano, wearing a black fur coat and Lions stocking cap, Franklin gave a rendition of "The Star-Spangled Banner" that lasted more than four minutes and featured a host of improvisations. Franklin released the album A Brand New Me in November 2017 with the Royal Philharmonic Orchestra, which uses archived recordings from Franklin.

Franklin canceled some concerts in 2017 for health reasons. Nevertheless, she was still garnering highly favorable reviews for her skill and showmanship. At the Ravinia Festival on September 3, 2017, she gave her last full concert. Franklin's final public performance was at the Cathedral of St. John the Divine in New York City during Elton John's 25th anniversary gala for the Elton John AIDS Foundation on November 7, 2017.

== Music style and image ==
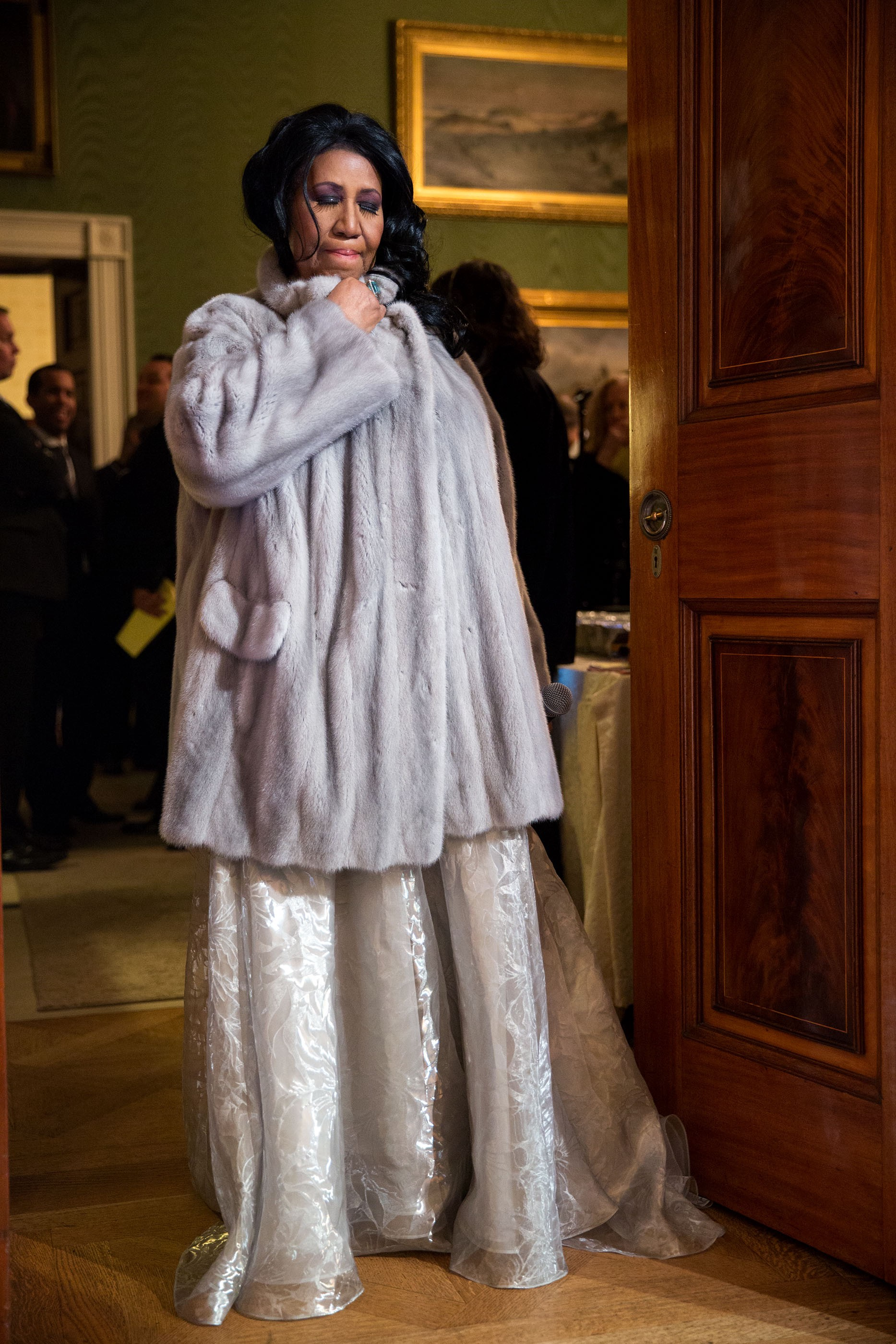
Franklin waiting to perform at the White House, in 2015

According to Richie Unterberger, Franklin was "one of the giants of soul music, and indeed of American pop as a whole. More than any other performer, she epitomized soul at its most gospel-charged". She had often been described as a great singer and musician because of "vocal flexibility, interpretive intelligence, skillful piano-playing, her ear, her experience". Franklin's voice was described as being a "powerful mezzo-soprano voice". She was praised for her arrangements and interpretations of other artists' hit songs. According to David Remnick, what "distinguishes her is not merely the breadth of her catalog or the cataract force of her vocal instrument; it's her musical intelligence, her way of singing behind the beat, of spraying a wash of notes over a single word or syllable, of constructing, moment by moment, the emotional power of a three-minute song. 'Respect' is as precise an artifact as a Ming vase." Describing Franklin's voice on her first album, Songs of Faith, released in 1956 when she was just 14, Jerry Wexler explained that it "was not that of a child but rather of an ecstatic hierophant". Critic Randy Lewis assessed her skills as a pianist as "magic" and "inspirational". Musicians and professionals alike – such as Elton John, Keith Richards, Carole King, and Clive Davis – were fans of her piano performances. In 2015, President Barack Obama wrote the following regarding Franklin:

Nobody embodies more fully the connection between the African-American spiritual, the blues, R. & B., rock and roll—the way that hardship and sorrow were transformed into something full of beauty and vitality and hope. American history wells up when Aretha sings. That's why, when she sits down at a piano and sings 'A Natural Woman,' she can move me to tears—the same way that Ray Charles's version of 'America the Beautiful' will always be in my view the most patriotic piece of music ever performed—because it captures the fullness of the American experience, the view from the bottom as well as the top, the good and the bad, and the possibility of synthesis, reconciliation, transcendence.

== Activism ==
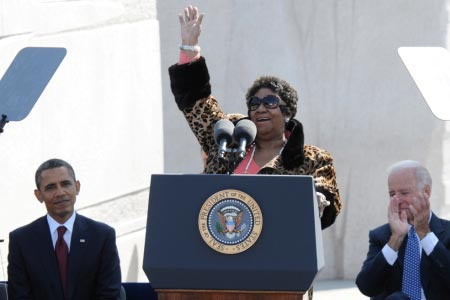
Franklin performing at the Martin Luther King Jr. Memorial in 2011 with President Barack Obama and Vice President Joe Biden looking on.

From her time growing up in the home of a prominent African-American preacher to the end of her life, Franklin was immersed and involved in the struggle for civil rights and women's rights. She provided money for civil rights groups, at times covering payroll, and performed at benefits and protests.

When Angela Davis was jailed in 1970, Franklin told Jet: "Angela Davis must go free ... Black people will be free. I've been locked up (for disturbing the peace in Detroit) and I know you got to disturb the peace when you can't get no peace. Jail is hell to be in. I'm going to see her free if there is any justice in our courts, not because I believe in communism, but because she's a Black woman and she wants freedom for Black people."

Her songs "Respect" and "(You Make Me Feel Like) A Natural Woman" became anthems of these movements for social change.

Franklin and several other American icons declined to take part in performing at President Donald Trump's 2017 inauguration as a mass act of musical protest.

Franklin was also a strong supporter of Native American rights. She quietly and without fanfare supported Indigenous peoples' struggles worldwide, and numerous movements that supported Native American and First Nation cultural rights.

== Personal life ==
Franklin moved to New York City from Detroit in the 1960s where she lived until relocating to Los Angeles in the mid-1970s. She eventually settled in the Los Angeles neighborhood of Encino, where she lived until 1982. She then returned to the Detroit suburb of Bloomfield Hills to be close to her ailing father and siblings. Franklin maintained a residence there until her death. Following an incident in 1984, she cited a fear of flying that prevented her from traveling overseas; she performed only in North America afterwards. Franklin was Baptist.

Franklin was the mother of four sons. At the age of 12, she gave birth to her first child, named Clarence after her father, on January 28, 1955. In one of her handwritten wills, discovered in 2019, Franklin revealed that the father was Edward Jordan Sr. On August 31, 1957, at the age of 15, Franklin had a second child fathered by Jordan, named Edward Derone Franklin after his father. Franklin did not like to discuss her early pregnancies with interviewers. Both children took her family name. While Franklin was pursuing her singing career and "hanging out with [friends]", her grandmother Rachel and sister Erma took turns raising her children. Franklin would visit them often. Her third child, Ted White Jr., was born to Franklin and her husband Theodore "Ted" White in February 1964 and is known professionally as Teddy Richards. He provided guitar backing for his mother's band during live concerts. Her youngest son, Kecalf Cunningham, was born in April 1970 and is the child of her road manager Ken Cunningham.

Franklin was married twice. Her first husband was Ted White, whom she married in 1961 at the age of 18. She had actually seen White the first time at a party held at her house in 1954. After a contentious marriage that was marred by domestic abuse, Franklin separated from White in 1968 and divorced him in 1969. She married actor Glynn Turman, on April 11, 1978, at her father's church. By marrying Turman, Franklin became stepmother of Turman's three children. Franklin and Turman separated in 1982 after she returned to Michigan from California and they divorced in 1984.

Franklin's sisters, Erma and Carolyn, were professional musicians and spent years performing background vocals on Franklin's recordings. Following Franklin's divorce from Ted White, her brother Cecil became her manager and maintained that position until his death from lung cancer on December 26, 1989. Her sister Carolyn died in April 1988 from breast cancer and her eldest sister Erma died from throat cancer in September 2002. Franklin's half-brother Vaughn died in late 2002. Her half-sister, Carol Ellan Kelley (née Jennings; 1940–2019), was C. L. Franklin's daughter by Mildred Jennings, a 12-year-old member of New Salem Baptist Church in Memphis where C. L. was pastor.

Franklin was performing at the Aladdin Hotel in Las Vegas, Nevada, on June 10, 1979, when her father, C. L., was shot twice at point-blank range in his Detroit home. After six months at Henry Ford Hospital while still in a coma, C. L. was moved back to his home with 24-hour nursing care. Aretha moved back to Detroit in late 1982 to support her sisters and assist with the care of her father, who died at Detroit's New Light Nursing Home on July 27, 1984.

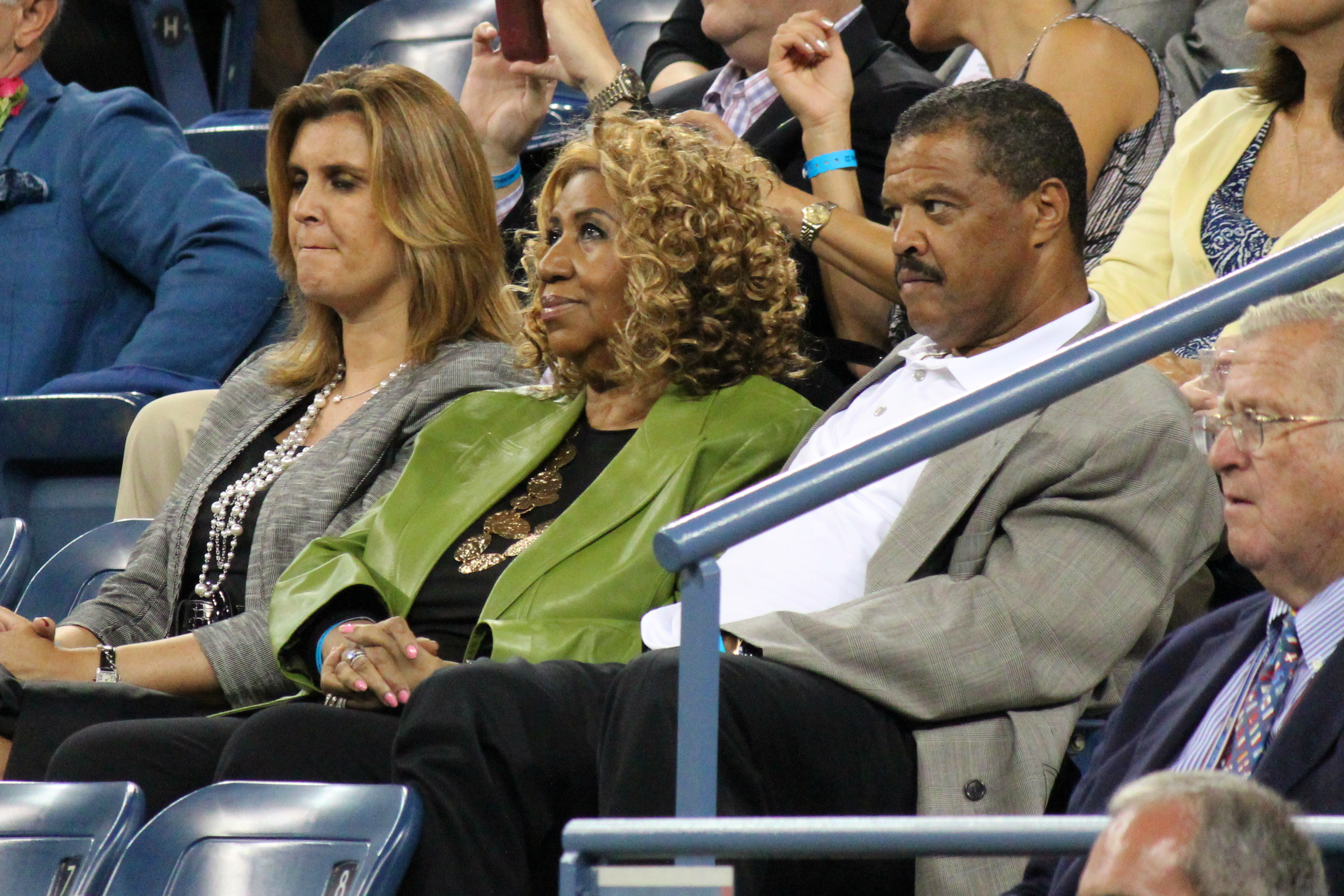
Franklin and William Wilkerson at the 2011 US Open

Franklin had a long friendship with Willie Wilkerson, a Vietnam War veteran and Detroit firefighter, who also helped in her work and cared for her when ill. In 2012 she announced plans to marry Wilkerson but she quickly called off the engagement. Franklin's music business friends included Dionne Warwick, Mavis Staples, and Cissy Houston, who began singing with Franklin as members of the Sweet Inspirations. Houston sang background on Franklin's hit "Ain't No Way". Franklin first met Cissy's young daughter, Whitney Houston, in the early 1970s. She was made Whitney's honorary aunt (not a godmother as has been occasionally reported) and Whitney often referred to her as "Auntie Ree" or "Aunt Ree". Franklin was a registered Democrat.

=== Health ===
Franklin had weight issues for many years. In 1974, she lost 40 pounds (18 kg) on a very-low-calorie diet and maintained her new weight until the end of the decade. She again lost weight in the early 1990s, before gaining some back. A former chain smoker who struggled with alcoholism, she quit smoking in 1992. She admitted in 1994 that her smoking was "messing with my voice", but after quitting smoking she said later, in 2003, that her weight "ballooned".

In 2010, Franklin canceled a number of concerts to have surgery for an undisclosed tumor. Discussing the surgery in 2011, she quoted her doctor as saying that it would "add 15 to 20 years" to her life. She denied that the ailment had anything to do with pancreatic cancer, as had been reported. Franklin added, "I don't have to talk about my health with anybody other than my doctors ... The problem has been resolved". Following the surgery, Franklin lost 85 lbs.; however, she denied that she had undergone weight-loss surgery. On May 19, 2011, Franklin had her comeback show at the Chicago Theatre.

In May 2013, Franklin canceled two performances because of an undisclosed medical treatment. Further concert cancellations followed in the summer and fall. During a phone interview with the Associated Press in late August 2013, Franklin stated that she had had a "miraculous" recovery from her undisclosed illness but had to cancel shows and appearances until her health was at 100%, estimating she was about "85% healed". Franklin later returned to live performing, including a 2013 Christmas concert at Detroit's MotorCity Casino Hotel. She launched a multi-city tour in mid-2014, starting with a performance on June 14 in New York at Radio City Music Hall.

In February 2017, Franklin announced in an interview with local Detroit television anchor, Evrod Cassimy, that 2017 would be her final year touring. However, she scheduled some 2018 concert dates before canceling them based on her physician's advice.

== Death and funeral ==
On August 13, 2018, Franklin was reported to be gravely ill at her home in Riverfront Towers, Detroit. She was under hospice care and surrounded by friends and family. Stevie Wonder, Jesse Jackson and former husband Glynn Turman visited her on her deathbed. Franklin died at her home on August 16, 2018, aged 76. She was initially thought to have died without a will. The cause of death was a malignant pancreatic neuroendocrine tumor (pNET), which is distinct from the most common form of pancreatic cancer. Numerous celebrities in the entertainment industry and politicians paid tribute to Franklin, including former U.S. President Barack Obama who said she "helped define the American experience". Civil rights activist and minister Al Sharpton called her a "civil rights and humanitarian icon".

A memorial service was held at her home church, New Bethel Baptist Church, on August 19. Thousands then paid their respects during the public lying-in-repose at the Charles H. Wright Museum of African American History. The August 31 Homegoing Service held at Greater Grace Temple in Detroit, included multiple tributes by celebrities, politicians, friends and family members and was streamed by some news agencies such as Fox News, CNN, The Word Network, BET and MSNBC. Among those who paid tribute to Aretha at the service were Ariana Grande, Bill Clinton, Rev. Al Sharpton, Louis Farrakhan, Faith Hill, Fantasia, the Clark Sisters, Ronald Isley, Angie Stone, Chaka Khan, Jennifer Holliday, Loretta Devine, Jennifer Hudson, Queen Latifah, Tasha Cobbs, Shirley Caesar, Shirma Rouse, Stevie Wonder, Eric Holder, Gladys Knight, Cedric the Entertainer, Tyler Perry, Smokey Robinson, Yolanda Adams, and Rev. Dr. William Barber II. At Franklin's request she was eulogized by Rev. Jasper Williams Jr. of Salem Baptist Church in Atlanta, as he had eulogized her father as well as speaking at other family memorials. Williams's eulogy was criticized for being "a political address that described children being in a home without a father as 'abortion after birth' and said black lives do not matter unless blacks stop killing each other". Franklin's nephew Vaughan complained of Williams: "He spoke for 50 minutes and at no time did he properly eulogize her." Following a telecast procession up Seven Mile Road, Franklin was interred at Woodlawn Cemetery in Detroit.

== Legacy and honors ==
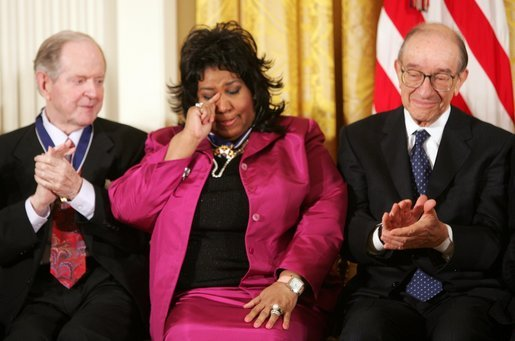
Franklin wipes a tear after being given the Presidential Medal of Freedom on November 9, 2005, at the White House. She is seated between fellow recipients Robert Conquest (left) and Alan Greenspan

Franklin received a star on the Hollywood Walk of Fame in 1979, had her voice declared a Michigan "natural resource" in 1985, and became the first woman inducted into the Rock and Roll Hall of Fame in 1987. In 1999, VH1 honored Franklin as the top artist in their 100 Greatest Women of Rock & Roll television special. The National Academy of Recording Arts and Sciences awarded her a Grammy Legend Award in 1991, then the Grammy Lifetime Achievement Award in 1994. Franklin was a Kennedy Center Honoree in 1994, recipient of the National Medal of Arts in 1999, recipient of the American Academy of Achievement's Golden Plate Award presented by Awards Council member Coretta Scott King, and was bestowed the Presidential Medal of Freedom in 2005 by then President George W. Bush. She was inducted into the Michigan Rock and Roll Legends Hall of Fame in 2005, and the Rhythm & Blues Hall of Fame in 2015. Franklin became the second woman inducted to the UK Music Hall of Fame in 2005. She was the 2008 MusiCares Person of the Year, performing at the Grammys days later. In 2019 she was awarded a Pulitzer Prize Special Citation "[f]or her indelible contribution to American music and culture for more than five decades". Franklin was the first individual woman to receive a Pulitzer Prize Special Citation. At the beginning of her career, Siouxsie Sioux named her as her favourite female singer.

In 2010 Franklin was ranked first on Rolling Stone magazine's list of the "100 Greatest Singers of All Time" and ninth on their list of "100 Greatest Artists of All Time". Following news of Franklin's surgery and recovery in February 2011, the Grammys ceremony paid tribute to the singer with a medley of her classics performed by Christina Aguilera, Florence Welch, Jennifer Hudson, Martina McBride, and Yolanda Adams. That same year, she was ranked 19th among the Billboard Hot 100 All-Time top artists.

When Rolling Stone listed the "Women in Rock: 50 Essential Albums" in 2002 and again in 2012, it listed Franklin's 1967 I Never Loved a Man the Way I Love You at number one. Inducted to the GMA Gospel Music Hall of Fame in 2012, Franklin was described as "the voice of the civil rights movement, the voice of black America". Asteroid 249516 Aretha was named in her honor in 2014. The next year, Billboard named her the greatest female R&B artist of all time. In 2018, Franklin was inducted in to the Memphis Music Hall of Fame.

"American history wells up when Aretha sings", President Obama explained in response to her performance of "A Natural Woman" at the 2015 Kennedy Center Honors. "Nobody embodies more fully the connection between the African-American spiritual, the blues, R&B, rock and roll—the way that hardship and sorrow were transformed into something full of beauty and vitality and hope." Franklin later recalled the 2015 Kennedy Center Honors as one of the best nights of her life. On June 8, 2017, the City of Detroit honored Franklin's legacy by renaming a portion of Madison Street, between Brush and Witherell Streets, Aretha Franklin Way. The Aretha Franklin Post Office Building was named in 2021, and is located at 12711 East Jefferson Avenue in Detroit, Michigan.

Rolling Stone called Franklin "the greatest singer of her generation". In April 2021, Aretha Franklin was featured in National Geographic magazine and in the previous month, the society began airing the third season of the television series Genius about her life and career. After working with the artist for nearly four decades, Clive Davis, said that Aretha "understood the essence of both language and melody and was able to take it to a place very few—if any—could". According to National Geographic, "she was a musical genius unmatched in her range, power, and soul".

=== Honorary degrees ===
Franklin received honorary degrees from Harvard University and New York University in 2014, as well as honorary doctorates in music from Princeton University, 2012; Yale University, 2010; Brown University, 2009; the University of Pennsylvania, 2007; Berklee College of Music, 2006; the New England Conservatory of Music, 1997; and the University of Michigan, 1987. She was awarded an honorary Doctor of Humane Letters by Case Western Reserve University 2011 and Wayne State University in 1990 and an honorary Doctor of Law degree by Bethune–Cookman University in 1975.

=== Tributes ===
After Franklin's death, fans added unofficial tributes to two New York City Subway stations: the Franklin Street station in Manhattan, served by the 1 train, and the Franklin Avenue station in Brooklyn, served by the C and S trains. Both stations were originally named after other people. Although the fan tributes were later taken down, the subway system's operator, the Metropolitan Transportation Authority, placed permanent black-and-white stickers with the word "Respect" next to the "Franklin" name signs in each station.

During the American Music Awards on October 9, 2018, the show was closed by bringing Gladys Knight, Donnie McClurkin, Ledisi, Cece Winans, and Mary Mary together to pay tribute to Aretha Franklin. The "all-star" group performed gospel songs, including renditions from Franklin's 1972 album, Amazing Grace.

A tribute concert, "Aretha! A Grammy Celebration for the Queen of Soul", was organized by CBS and the Recording Academy on January 13, 2019, at the Shrine Auditorium in Los Angeles. The concert included performances by Smokey Robinson, Janelle Monáe, Alicia Keys, John Legend, Kelly Clarkson, Celine Dion, Alessia Cara, Patti LaBelle, Jennifer Hudson, Chloe x Halle, H.E.R., SZA, Brandi Carlile, Yolanda Adams and Shirley Caesar, and was recorded for television, airing on March 10.

At the 61st Annual Grammy Awards, the ceremony was ended with a memorial tribute to the life and career of Franklin. The tribute concluded with a rendition of her 1968 hit, "A Natural Woman (You Make Me Feel Like)", performed by Fantasia Barrino-Taylor, Andra Day and Yolanda Adams.

In 2019, Time created 89 new covers to celebrate women of the year starting from 1920; it chose Franklin for 1968.

Rick Price wrote a tribute "Farewell But Not Goodbye" for his Soulville album released in 2021.

In June 2023, Aretha – A Love Letter to the Queen of Soul opened at Sydney Opera House before heading to Brisbane and Melbourne. Australian playwright, actor and screenwriter Jada Alberts directed and narrated the musical, which featured Emma Donovan, Montaigne, Thandi Phoenix, Thndo, and Ursula Yovich, along with a nine-piece band.

=== Portrayals in media ===
On January 29, 2018, Gary Graff confirmed that Jennifer Hudson would play Franklin in a biographical film. The film, Respect, was released in August 2021 in various countries. On February 10, 2019, it was announced that the subject of the third season of the American National Geographic anthology television series Genius would be Franklin, in the "first-ever, definitive scripted miniseries on the life of the universally acclaimed Queen of Soul". The season, starring Cynthia Erivo as Franklin, was aired in March 2021. However, Franklin's family denounced the series, claiming to be uninvolved with the production process, despite the production team stating that the series had been endorsed by the Franklin estate.

Franklin, as the "Queen of Soul", is name-checked in the 1980 single "Hey Nineteen" by Steely Dan from their album Gaucho.

== Discography ==
Studio albums

- Aretha: With the Ray Bryant Combo (1961)
- The Electrifying Aretha Franklin (1962)
- The Tender, the Moving, the Swinging Aretha Franklin (1962)
- Laughing on the Outside (1963)
- Unforgettable: A Tribute to Dinah Washington (1964)
- Runnin' Out of Fools (1964)
- Yeah!!! (1965)
- Soul Sister (1966)
- I Never Loved a Man the Way I Love You (1967)
- Take It Like You Give It (1967)
- Aretha Arrives (1967)
- Lady Soul (1968)
- Aretha Now (1968)
- Soul '69 (1969)
- Soft and Beautiful (1969)
- This Girl's in Love with You (1970)
- Spirit in the Dark (1970)
- Young, Gifted and Black (1972)
- Hey Now Hey (The Other Side of the Sky) (1973)
- Let Me in Your Life (1974)
- With Everything I Feel in Me (1974)
- You (1975)
- Sparkle (1976, soundtrack)
- Sweet Passion (1977)
- Almighty Fire (1978)
- La Diva (1979)
- Aretha (1980)
- Love All the Hurt Away (1981)
- Jump to It (1982)
- Get It Right (1983)
- Who's Zoomin' Who? (1985)
- Aretha (1986)
- Through the Storm (1989)
- What You See Is What You Sweat (1991)
- A Rose Is Still a Rose (1998)
- So Damn Happy (2003)
- This Christmas, Aretha (2008)
- A Woman Falling Out of Love (2011)
- Aretha Franklin Sings the Great Diva Classics (2014)

== Filmography ==
Concerts, specials, appearances

- 1967–1982: The Tonight Show Starring Johnny Carson – guest
- 1968: Aretha Franklin and The Sweet Inspirations in Concert
- 1968: The Hollywood Palace – guest
- 1969: 41st Academy Awards – performer
- 1970: This is Tom Jones – guest
- 1970: It's Cliff Richard – guest – BBC
- 1970: It's Lulu – Guest – BBC
- 1978: Dick Clark's Live Wednesday – guest – ABC
- 1978: Aretha Franklin Live in Canada – ITV
- 1978: Kennedy Center Honors – CBS
- 1981–1985: Solid Gold – performer – CBS
- 1982: It's Not Easy Bein' Me – guest – NBC
- 1983: American Music Awards of 1983 – performer/host – ABC
- 1983: Midem '83 – performer – TF1
- 1985: Soundstage – performer – PBS
- 1986: Aretha (TV Special) – Showtime
- 1986: American Music Awards of 1986 – performer – ABC
- 1988: James Brown and Friends: Set Fire to the Soul – performer – HBO
- 1990: Night of 100 Stars III – performer – NBC
- 1991–1992: The Joan Rivers Show – performer – HBO
- 1992: 23rd Annual Grammy Awards – performer – CBS
- 1992: Kennedy Center Honors – performer – CBS
- 1993: Evening at Pops – performer – PBS

Documentaries

- 1972: Black Rodeo (documentary)
- 1990: Listen Up: The Lives of Quincy Jones (documentary)
- 2003: Tom Dowd & the Language of Music (documentary)
- 2012: The Zen of Bennett (documentary)
- 2013: Muscle Shoals (documentary)
- 2018: Amazing Grace (documentary)

As an actress

- 1972: Room 222 (as Inez Jackson)
- 1980: The Blues Brothers (as Mrs. Murphy)
- 1991: Murphy Brown (as herself)
- 1997: The Brave Little Toaster to the Rescue (as voice of Homebuilt Computer)
- 1998: Blues Brothers 2000 (as Mrs. Murphy)

== See also ==
- List of awards and nominations received by Aretha Franklin
- Muscle Shoals Rhythm Section

== General sources ==
- Bego, Mark (2001). Aretha Franklin: The Queen of Soul. Boston: Da Capo Press. ISBN 978-0-306-80935-4.
- Bracks, Lean'tin (2012). African American Almanac. Detroit: Visible Ink Press. ISBN 978-1-57859-323-1.
- Dobkin, Matt (2006). I Never Loved A Man The Way I Love You: Aretha Franklin, Respect, and the Making Of A Soul Music Masterpiece. New York: St. Martin's Griffin. p. 6. ISBN 978-0-312-31828-4.
- Feiler, Bruce (2009). America's Prophet. HarperCollins. ISBN 978-0-06-193925-9.
- McAvoy, Jim (2002). Aretha Franklin. Infobase Publishing. ISBN 978-1-4381-2161-1.
- McMahon, Thomas (2000). Creative and Performing Artists for Teens. Gale Group. ISBN 978-0-7876-3975-4.
- "Census | Queen of Soul's Father Rev. C. L. Franklin, 69, Dies After 5 Years in Coma". Jet. August 13, 1984. p. 15.
- Randolph, Laura B. (April 1995). "Aretha Talks About Men, Marriage, Music & Motherhood". Ebony. Vol. 50, no. 6. pp. 28–34.
- "Rev. C. L. Franklin shot". Baltimore Afro-American. United Press International. June 12, 1979. p. 24.
- Ritz, David (2014). Respect: The Life of Aretha Franklin. New York: Little, Brown and Company. ISBN 978-0-316-19683-3.
- Warner, Jennifer (2014). Respect: The Life and Times of Aretha Franklin. BookCaps. ISBN 978-1-629-17386-3.
- "Swingin' Aretha". Ebony. Vol. 19, no. 5. March 1964. pp. 85–90.
- "The New Aretha". Ebony. Vol. 29, no. 12. October 1974. pp. 178–184.
- Waldron, Clarence (September 29, 2003). "Aretha Franklin Returns With Soulful CD, 'So Damn Happy'". Jet. Vol. 104, no. 14. pp. 58–63.
- Whitaker, Matthew C. (2011). Icons of Black America: Breaking Barriers and Crossing Boundaries [Three Volumes]. ABC-CLIO. ISBN 978-0-313-37643-6.
