= Greta Van Fleet discography =

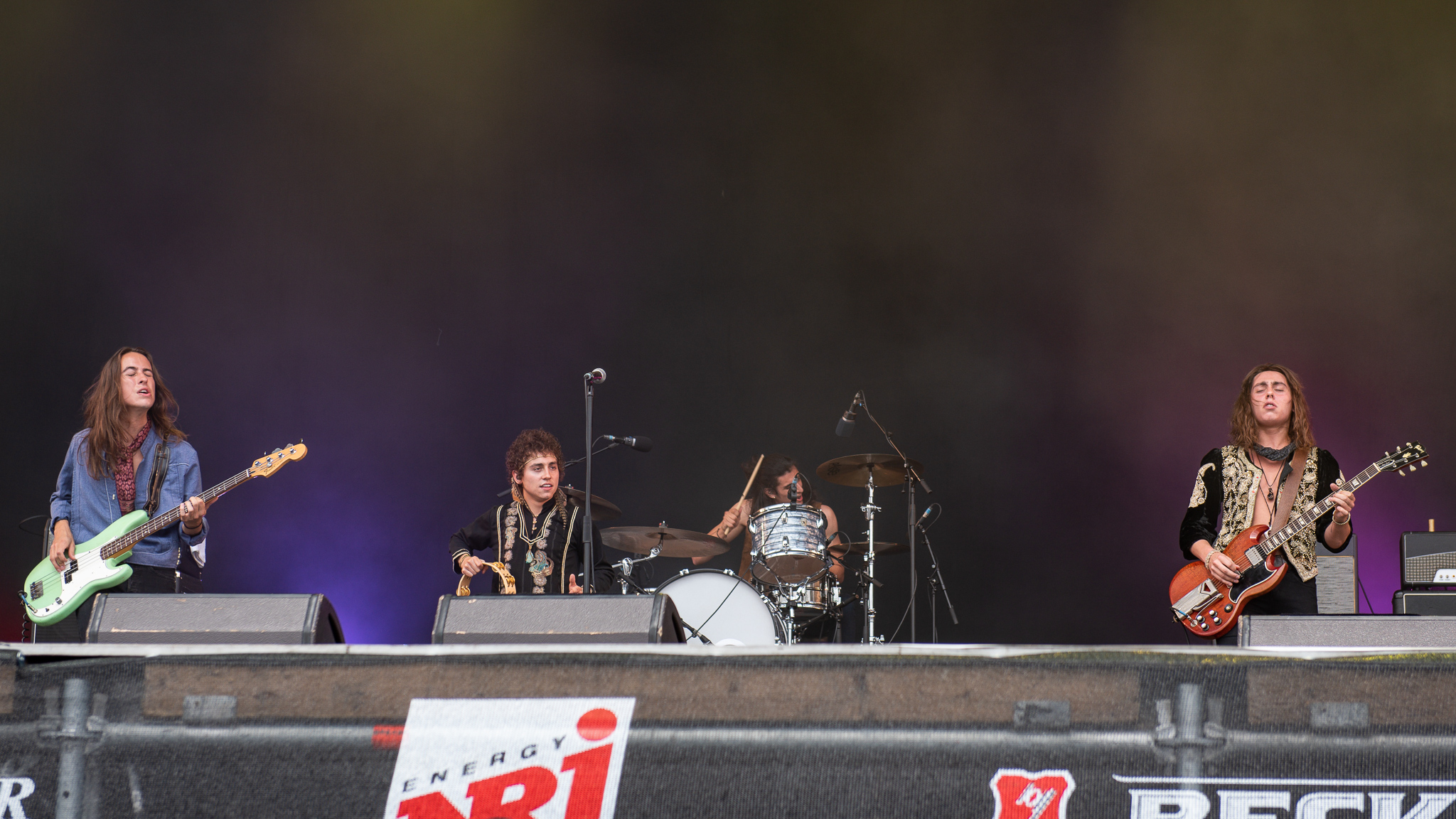
- Greta Van Fleet performing in 2018
- Studio albums: 4
- EPs: 2
- Live albums: 4
- Singles: 13
- Music videos: 9

Greta Van Fleet is an American hard rock band. The band released their debut studio EP, Black Smoke Rising in 2017. Their debut single, "Highway Tune", topped the Billboard US Mainstream Rock and Active Rock charts in September 2017 for four weeks in a row. A second EP running at 32 minutes From the Fires, containing the four songs from Black Smoke Rising and four new songs, was released on November 10, 2017, alongside a second single, "Safari Song". Their debut full length studio album running at 49 minutes, Anthem of the Peaceful Army, was released on October 19, 2018 and it topped the Billboard Rock Albums chart in the first week after its release, with the album's first single, "When the Curtain Falls", being released ahead of it in July 2018, and eventually becoming the band's third number one US single on the Billboard Mainstream Rock Songs chart. Anthem of the Peaceful Army also launched atop the Billboard Hard Rock Albums chart, and reached the number one spot on the Billboard Top Album Sales chart in the first week after its release. The 64 minute album, The Battle at Garden's Gate was released on April 16, 2021, with their singles "Heat Above", "Light My Love", and "My Way, Soon". It debuted at number 8 on the Billboard 200 chart. The band’s third album Starcatcher was on July 21, 2023, through Lava and Republic Records.

== Studio albums ==
List of studio albums, with selected chart positions and certifications
Title	Details	Peak chart positions										Certifications
Title	Details	US	AUS	BEL (WA)	CAN	GER	ITA	NZ	SWE	SWI	UK	Certifications
Anthem of the Peaceful Army	Released: October 19, 2018; Label: Republic; Formats: CD, LP, digital download	3	10	9	2	3	6	7	6	6	12	RIAA: Gold; FIMI: Gold; MC: Gold
The Battle at Garden's Gate	Released: April 16, 2021; Label: Republic; Formats: CD, LP, digital download	7	42	1	11	3	6	—	11	3	8	
Starcatcher	Released: July 21, 2023; Label: Republic; Formats: CD, LP, digital download	8	—	3	19	2	18	—	22	2	8	
Palace for the People	Released: October 9, 2026; Label: Republic; Formats: CD, LP, digital download	9	—	11	44	4	77	—	44	2	40	
"—" denotes a recording that did not chart or was not released in that territory.

== Extended plays ==
List of extended plays, with selected chart positions and certifications
Title	Details	Peak chart positions										Certifications
Title	Details	US	AUS	BEL (FL)	BEL (WA)	CAN	GER	ITA	NZ Heat.	SWI	UK Sales	Certifications
Black Smoke Rising	Released: April 21, 2017; Label: Republic; Formats: CD, LP, digital download	182	—	—	—	—	—	—	—	—	—	
From the Fires	Released: November 10, 2017; Label: Republic; Formats: CD, LP, digital download	36	75	67	31	23	84	60	4	95	76	RIAA: Gold; BPI: Silver; FIMI: Gold; MC: Platinum; RMNZ: Gold
"—" denotes a recording that did not chart or was not released in that territory.

== Live albums ==
List of live albums
Title	Details
Strange Horizons 2021: Live from Nashville	Released: April 14, 2022; Label: Republic; Formats: LP
Strange Horizons 2021: Live from Bridgeport	Released: April 15, 2022; Label: Republic; Formats: LP
Strange Horizons 2021: Live from Chicago	Released: April 16, 2022; Label: Republic; Formats: LP
Strange Horizons 2021: Live from Los Angeles	Released: April 18, 2022; Label: Republic; Formats: LP

== Singles ==
List of singles, with selected chart positions and certifications, showing year released and album name
Title	Year	Peak chart positions										Certifications	Album
Title	Year	US Rock	ARG Air.	BEL (FL) Tip	BEL (WA) Tip	BOL	CAN Rock	CZR Rock	ICE	POL	UK Sales	Certifications	Album
"Highway Tune"	2017	21	6	—	— (Note: "Highway Tune" did not enter the Ultratop 50, but registered as an "extra tip" on the Walloon Ultratip Bubbling Under chart.)	—	4	—	10	1	6	RIAA: Platinum; MC: 3× Platinum	Black Smoke Rising (EP)
"Safari Song"	2017	25	—	—	—	—	2	3	—	4	—	RIAA: Gold; MC: 2× Platinum	Black Smoke Rising (EP)
"When the Curtain Falls"	2018	9	—	4	37	18	2	6	—	13	—	RIAA: Gold; MC: Platinum	Anthem of the Peaceful Army
"You're the One"	2018	12	—	—	—	—	3	—	—	11	—	RIAA: Gold; MC: Platinum	Anthem of the Peaceful Army
"Lover, Leaver"	2019	32	—	— (Note: "Lover, Leaver" did not enter the Ultratop 50, but registered as an "extra tip" on the Flanders Ultratip Bubbling Under chart.)	— (Note: "Lover, Leaver" did not enter the Ultratop 50, but registered as an "extra tip" on the Walloon Ultratip Bubbling Under chart.)	—	4	—	—	9	—		Anthem of the Peaceful Army
"My Way, Soon"	2020	45	—	—	— (Note: "My Way, Soon" did not enter the Ultratop 50, but registered as an "extra tip" on the Walloon Ultratip Bubbling Under chart.)	—	8	—	—	—	—		The Battle at Garden's Gate
"Age of Machine"	2020	— (Note: "Age of Machine" did not enter the Hot Rock & Alternative Songs chart, but peaked at number eight on the Hard Rock Digital Song Sales chart.)	—	—	—	—	—	—	—	—	—		The Battle at Garden's Gate
"Heat Above"	2021	27	—	—	—	—	12	4	—	—	—	RIAA: Gold; MC: Platinum	The Battle at Garden's Gate
"Built by Nations"	2021	— (Note: "Built by Nations" did not enter the Hot Rock & Alternative Songs chart, but peaked at number 13 on the Rock & Alternative Airplay chart.)	—	—	—	—	45	14	—	—	—		The Battle at Garden's Gate
"Meeting the Master"	2023	33	—	—	—	—	26	—	—	—	—		Starcatcher
"The Falling Sky"	2023	— (Note: "The Falling Sky" did not enter the Hot Rock & Alternative Songs chart, but peaked at number nine on the Mainstream Rock Airplay chart.)	—	—	—	—	—	—	—	—	—		Starcatcher
"Play Your Games"	2026	— (Note: "Play Your Games" did not enter the Hot Rock & Alternative Songs chart, but peaked at number 12 on the Mainstream Rock Airplay chart.)	—	—	—	—	—	—	—	—	—		Palace for the People
"Tear It Down"	2026	— (Note: "Tear It Down" did not enter the Hot Rock & Alternative Songs chart, but peaked at number 13 on the Mainstream Rock Airplay chart.)	—	—	—	—	—	—	—	—	—		Palace for the People
"—" denotes a recording that did not chart or was not released in that territory.

=== Promotional singles ===
List of promotional singles, with selected chart positions, showing year released, and album name
Song	Year	Peak chart positions		Album
Song	Year	US Hard Rock	CZR Rock	Album
"Rolling in the Deep"	2018	—	—	Spotify Singles
"Broken Bells"	2021	15	—	The Battle at Garden's Gate
"Sacred the Thread"	2023	25	11	Starcatcher
"Farewell for Now"	2023	19	—	Starcatcher
"Saw You Stand"	2026	2	—	Palace for the People
"—" denotes a recording that did not chart or was not released in that territory.

== Other charted and certified songs ==
List of other charted and certified songs, with selected chart positions, showing year released, certifications and album name
Title	Year	Peak chart positions						Certifications	Album
Title	Year	US Hard Rock	US Main. Rock	US Rock	US Rock Digi.	BEL (WA) Tip	POL	Certifications	Album
"Black Smoke Rising"	2017	—	39	— (Note: "Black Smoke Rising" did not enter the Hot Rock & Alternative Songs chart, but peaked at number 14 on the Hard Rock Digital Song Sales chart.)	—	—	—	RIAA: Gold; MC: Platinum	Black Smoke Rising (EP)
"Edge of Darkness"	2017	—	—	38	15	—	7	MC: Gold	From the Fires
"Flower Power"	2017	—	—	—	—	40	—	MC: Gold	From the Fires
"A Change Is Gonna Come"	2017	—	—	— (Note: "A Change Is Gonna Come" did not enter the Hot Rock & Alternative Songs chart, but peaked at number five on the Hard Rock Digital Song Sales chart.)	—	—	—	MC: Gold	From the Fires
"Meet on the Ledge"	2017	—	—	— (Note: "Meet on the Ledge" did not enter the Hot Rock & Alternative Songs chart, but peaked at number 10 on the Hard Rock Digital Song Sales chart.)	—	—	—		From the Fires
"Talk on the Street"	2017	—	—	— (Note: "Talk on the Street" did not enter the Hot Rock & Alternative Songs chart, but peaked at number six on the Hard Rock Digital Song Sales chart.)	—	—	—		From the Fires
"Watching Over"	2018	—	—	41	—	—	—		Anthem of the Peaceful Army
"Always There"	2019	—	—	31	5	—	18		A Million Little Pieces
"Tears of Rain"	2021	24	—	—	—	—	—		The Battle at Garden's Gate
"Stardust Chords"	2021	20	—	—	—	—	—		The Battle at Garden's Gate
"Light My Love"	2021	3	—	45	—	—	—	MC: Gold	The Battle at Garden's Gate
"The Weight of Dreams"	2021	25	—	—	—	—	—		The Battle at Garden's Gate
"The Indigo Streak"	2023	17	—	—	—	—	—		Starcatcher
"Heya"	2026	7	—	—	—	—	—		Palace For the People
"—" denotes a recording that did not chart or was not released in that territory.

== Music videos ==
List of music videos, showing year released and directors
Title	Year	Director(s)
"Highway Tune"	2017	Ford Fairchild
"When the Curtain Falls"	2018	Benjamin Kutsko
"My Way, Soon"	2020	Greta Van Fleet
"Age of Machine"	2020	Matthew Daniel Siskin
"Heat Above"	2021	Matthew Daniel Siskin
"Meeting the Master"	2023	Gus Black & Greta Van Fleet
"The Falling Sky"	2023	Gus Black & Greta Van Fleet
"Play Your Games"	2026	Nikola Crnobrnja
"Saw You Stand"	2026	Nikola Crnobrnja & Greta Van Fleet
