= Anthem of the Peaceful Army =

2018 studio album by Greta Van Fleet

Studio album by Greta Van Fleet
- Released: October 19, 2018
- Recorded: 2018
- Studio: Blackbird Studios, Nashville, Tennessee
- Genre: Hard rock; blues rock
- Length: 45:53
- Label: Lava; Republic
- Producer: Marlon Young; Al Sutton; Herschel Boone

Greta Van Fleet chronology
| From the Fires (2017) | Anthem of the Peaceful Army (2018) | The Battle at Garden's Gate (2021) |

Singles from Anthem of the Peaceful Army
- 1. "When the Curtain Falls" Released: July 17, 2018; 2. "You're the One" Released: November 27, 2018; 3. "Lover, Leaver" Released: May 9, 2019

Anthem of the Peaceful Army is the debut studio album by American rock band Greta Van Fleet. The album was released on October 19, 2018, and follows the band's two EP releases, Black Smoke Rising and From the Fires. The first single, "When the Curtain Falls", was released in July 2018. A second single, "You're the One" was released around the time of the album's release.

The album was the top selling album in its debut week in the US, selling 87,000 copies. Factoring in album equivalent units, it debuted at number three on the Billboard 200.

== Background ==
The band had formed in 2012, but was largely relegated to local live shows and touring until 2017, with the band's release of the EPs Black Smoke Rising and From the Fires. The band found success with the releases, namely with the singles "Highway Tune" and "Safari Song", which both topped the Billboard Mainstream Rock chart, for five and three weeks respectively. With the songs' success, they moved to record a full-length album, while still actively touring in support of the EPs.

== Writing and recording ==
The band's original plan had been to quickly record songs they had written over the course of the last three to five years, of which the band had amassed a large number. However, upon entering the studio, the band opted to write and record mostly new music, all during a short two week stint in the studio. It was later clarified that about 75% of the album was written during the 2018 sessions. They experimented more in the studio with different tones and instruments than they did recording the EPs. A lap steel guitar was used on "Anthem" and a guitar modified to sound like a sitar in "Watching Over". The name of the album comes from a poem Josh Kiszka wrote on the tour bus after having words come to him as he drifted in and out of sleep. In the studio, the project became what Sam Kiszka admitted was a concept album that addressed ecological concerns as well as themes of hate, greed and evil. "It kind of dives into roots and beliefs. I think it asks fairly large questions. What are we doing to ourselves? What are we doing to our environment? What are we doing to each other? Why must there be hate? And why must there be greed and evil? I think it simply asks the question of why can't we all be one? We're all people. We all look up at the same sky, breathing the same air. We all come from the same place." Additional songs were written during a stay at a cabin deep in the woods of Chattanooga, Tennessee. According to Jake Kiszka he would stay up late at night editing and mixing and "very clearly" hear footsteps behind him that only stopped when he commanded them to. Danny Wagner also reported hearing the laugh of a little girl while alone in the cabin. Jake said these incidents ended up influencing some of the tracks. In an interview for Rolling Stone Josh said "If there’s a haunted fucking cabin, this would be the one. It was quite an experience. We set the drums up in this big room in front of a fireplace. We wanted to get out into more of a wilderness setting because that’s where these things become clear. Jake would get nice and drunk and talk to the spirits. I’d step out on the balcony and look down, and he’d just be drunk and talking off into space like nothing existed." Sam also said he has "very specific memories of "Age of Man" being written and coming to life there." and went on to agree he believed the cabin was haunted. "Age of Man" also contains the line "lands of ice and snow", a probable quote of the Led Zeppelin song "Immigrant Song". When asked if this was intentional, Josh said "In some ways it was a bit of a wink..."

== Release and promotion ==
The album's first single, "When the Curtain Falls", was released in July 2018, along with the band promoting the song with their live national television debut on The Tonight Show Starring Jimmy Fallon. In November 2018, the single peaked at number 1 on the Billboard Mainstream Rock songs chart. The album's title, Anthem of the Peaceful Army, and release date, October 19, 2018, was announced in early September 2018. A small album teaser, along with a new song, "Watching Over", were also released around the time of the announcement. Further songs "Lover, Leaver", "Anthem" and "You're the One" were released ahead of the album on September 21, October 5 and 16, respectively. The day before the album came out, the band set up an online promotion that allowed users to listen to the song "Age of Man" if they walked to a local park and opened a link on their mobile phone. Digital versions have a slightly different tracklist than physical copies, due to including an alternate version of "Lover Leaver".

== Reception ==
Professional ratings
Aggregate scores
| Source | Rating |
|---|---|
| AnyDecentMusic? | 4.6/10 |
| Metacritic | 53/100 |
Review scores
| Source | Rating |
| AllMusic | 2.5/5 stars |
| Chicago Tribune | 2/4 stars |
| Classic Rock | 3.5/5 stars |
| Consequence of Sound | C+ |
| Entertainment Weekly | B |
| Mojo | 3/5 stars |
| NME | 3/5 stars |
| The New York Times | (mixed) |
| Pitchfork | 1.6/10 |
| Rolling Stone | 3/5 stars |

Critical reviews of Anthem of the Peaceful Army were mixed, the album garnering an aggregate Metacritic score of 53 out of 100 based on thirteen reviews. Classic Rock magazine strongly praised the album, concluding that it was "one of the most exciting records released by a new band in recent years...partly a result of the amount of money and attention that's being thrown at them – this is the first time in years that a rock band has been given a genuine fighting chance by a major label – but it's mostly down to the youthful, unmanufacturable exhilaration that courses through its 10 tracks." Conversely, Esquire reasoned that "the state of guitar music in general [had] been waiting for another Black Keys or Kings of Leon to come along to revive interest in a rapidly aging sound," explaining the praise towards the album, but the actual music was "bad and [the band's] entire aesthetic feels disingenuous" because it was released by a major label. Jeremy D. Larson of Pitchfork heavily criticized the album, calling it "half-baked boomer fetishism" and an "interminable 49-minute drag." Larson's statements were met with controversy and criticism by some, with Tyler Sharp of Loudwire noting that the response was 'unparalleled in terms of rock music criticism in 2018'. In a negative review, YouTube music reviewer Anthony Fantano accused the album of being unoriginal and of ripping off the sound of Led Zeppelin, and said that "it spits in the face of artistic evolution."

Despite the mixed reception, the album was nominated for a Kerrang! Award for 'Best Album'.

== Track listing ==
All tracks are written by Joshua Michael Kiszka, Jacob Thomas Kiszka, Samuel Francis Kiszka, and Daniel Robert Wagner.

Physical track listing
| No. | Title | Length |
|---|---|---|
| 1. | "Age of Man" | 6:06 |
| 2. | "The Cold Wind" | 3:16 |
| 3. | "When the Curtain Falls" | 3:42 |
| 4. | "Watching Over" | 4:28 |
| 5. | "Lover, Leaver (Taker, Believer)" | 6:01 |
| 6. | "You're the One" | 4:25 |
| 7. | "The New Day" | 3:44 |
| 8. | "Mountain of the Sun" | 4:30 |
| 9. | "Brave New World" | 5:00 |
| 10. | "Anthem" | 4:41 |
| Total length: | | 45:53 |

Japanese edition bonus tracks
| No. | Title | Length |
|---|---|---|
| 11. | "Highway Tune" | 3:01 |
| 12. | "Safari Song" | 3:55 |
| 13. | "Flower Power" | 5:13 |
| 14. | "Black Smoke Rising" | 4:20 |
| Total length: | | 62:27 |

Digital track listing
| No. | Title | Length |
|---|---|---|
| 1. | "Age of Man" | 6:06 |
| 2. | "The Cold Wind" | 3:16 |
| 3. | "When the Curtain Falls" | 3:42 |
| 4. | "Watching Over" | 4:28 |
| 5. | "Lover, Leaver" | 3:35 |
| 6. | "You're the One" | 4:25 |
| 7. | "The New Day" | 3:44 |
| 8. | "Mountain of the Sun" | 4:30 |
| 9. | "Brave New World" | 5:00 |
| 10. | "Anthem" | 4:45 |
| 11. | "Lover, Leaver (Taker, Believer)" | 6:01 |
| Total length: | | 49:27 |

== Personnel ==
Credits adapted from Anthem of the Peaceful Army liner notes.

Greta Van Fleet

- Joshua Kiszka – vocals
- Jacob Kiszka – guitar, backing vocals
- Samuel Kiszka – bass guitar, keyboards, backing vocals, bass pedals
- Daniel Wagner – drums, percussion, backing vocals

Production

- Al Sutton – production, recording engineer, mixing
- Marlon Young – production, mixing
- Herschel Boone – production
- Tanner Peters – assistant recording engineer
- Jason Mott – assistant recording engineer
- Ryan Smith – mastering
- Eliot Lee Hazel – photography
- Kyledidthis – art direction and design
- Ashley Pawlak – art direction and design

== Charts ==
=== Weekly charts ===
| Chart (2018) | Peak position |
|---|---|
| Australian Albums (ARIA) | 10 |
| Austrian Albums (Ö3 Austria) | 9 |
| Belgian Albums (Ultratop Flanders) | 20 |
| Belgian Albums (Ultratop Wallonia) | 9 |
| Canadian Albums (Billboard) | 2 |
| Czech Albums (ČNS IFPI) | 30 |
| Dutch Albums (Album Top 100) | 18 |
| Finnish Albums (Suomen virallinen lista) | 43 |
| German Albums (Offizielle Top 100) | 3 |
| Irish Albums (IRMA) | 41 |
| Italian Albums (FIMI) | 6 |
| Japan Hot Albums (Billboard Japan) | 86 |
| Japanese Albums (Oricon) | 58 |
| New Zealand Albums (RMNZ) | 7 |
| Norwegian Albums (VG-lista) | 14 |
| Polish Albums (ZPAV) | 5 |
| Scottish Albums (OCC) | 6 |
| Spanish Albums (PROMUSICAE) | 15 |
| Swedish Albums (Sverigetopplistan) | 6 |
| Swiss Albums (Schweizer Hitparade) | 6 |
| UK Albums (OCC) | 12 |
| UK Rock & Metal Albums (OCC) | 1 |
| US Billboard 200 | 3 |
| US Top Rock Albums (Billboard) | 1 |

=== Year-end charts ===
| Chart (2018) | Position |
|---|---|
| Belgian Albums (Ultratop Flanders) | 178 |
| Belgian Albums (Ultratop Wallonia) | 106 |
| US Top Rock Albums (Billboard) | 56 |

| Chart (2019) | Position |
|---|---|
| Belgian Albums (Ultratop Flanders) | 173 |
| Belgian Albums (Ultratop Wallonia) | 91 |
| US Top Rock Albums (Billboard) | 48 |

== Certifications ==
| Region | Certification | Certified units/sales |
|---|---|---|
| Canada (Music Canada) | Gold | 40,000^{‡} |
| Italy (FIMI) | Gold | 25,000^{‡} |
| Poland (ZPAV) | Platinum | 20,000^{‡} |
| United States (RIAA) | Gold | 500,000^{‡} |
^{‡} Sales+streaming figures based on certification alone.
