= Mirador (band) =

British-American rock band

MIRADOR
- Genres: Rock; blues rock; blues; folk
- Years active: 2024–present
- Label: Republic
- Members: Jake Kiszka; Chris Turpin; Mikey Sorbello; Nick Pini
- Website: miradorband.com

MIRADOR is a British-American band formed in 2024 by Jake Kiszka from Greta Van Fleet, and Chris Turpin from Ida Mae. Turpin describes Mirador as "a deep passion for rock'n'roll, early folk and country blues as well as folklore", while Kiszka describes their music as speaking to "unspoken mysticism [such as] stories of meeting the devil at the crossroads, selling your soul, and losing your mind to the wind".

== History ==
=== Formation ===
Chris and Jake met in 2018 when Ida Mae opened for Greta Van Fleet. Jake describes his friendship with Chris starting in 2019 when Ida Mae opened for Greta Van Fleet on a portion of their United States tour leg. Backstage jam sessions on the tour turned into songs collaborations. Once Chris and Jake decided to formalize their band, they invited Mikey Sorbello to join on drums and Nick Pini to join on bass and keyboard, both of whom had worked with Turpin before.

Jake originally suggested the band be called "Marauder" in a text to Chris but misspelled it as "Mirador". Chris confirmed that he liked it before Jake could correct the typo. When Jake looked up Mirador, he discovered that it meant a vista or a viewpoint suspended on a high place, typically overlooking a body of water. Considering their respective history of admiring the music on the other side of the Atlantic Ocean, they felt that Mirador fit well.

=== Touring ===
In the spring of 2024, Mirador opened for the Greta Van Fleet's Starcatcher world tour. In May 2025, Mirador started their first headlining tour across major cities in the United States.

== Critical reception ==
Celebrity Access describes Mirador as "sky-shaking and boundary-bursting rock ‘n’ roll by invoking spirits of ancient myth, traditional folklore, and Delta-born blues in one concentrated musical incantation".

Melodic Magazine described "Feels Like Gold" as "an exposed guitar solo that immediately pulls you in before giving way to killer rockstar vocals".

The Music Box describes Mirador as "[feeling] like a band with a clear vision, and a bridge between two worlds of music".

== Band members ==
- Jake Kiszka – vocals, guitar, harmonica, carnyx horn
- Chris Turpin – vocals, guitar
- Mikey Sorbello – drums
- Nick Pini – bass, keyboards

== Discography ==
=== Studio albums ===
- Mirador (September 19, 2025)

=== Singles ===
- "Feels Like Gold" (July 25, 2025)
- "Fortune's Fate" (August 22, 2025)
