= Farewell for Now =

Promotional single by Greta Van Fleet

from the album Starcatcher
- Written: 2021-2022
- Released: July 8, 2023
- Recorded: 2022
- Genre: Blues rock; hard rock
- Length: 4:29
- Label: Republic Records
- Songwriters: Jake Kiszka; Josh Kiszka; Sam Kiszka; Danny Wagner; Dave Cobb
- Producer: Dave Cobb

Greta Van Fleet singles chronology
"Sacred the Thread" (2023)	"Farewell for Now" (2023)	"The Falling Sky" (2023)

"Farewell for Now" is a song by American rock band Greta Van Fleet. It was released as a promotional single from their third album, Starcatcher.

== Background ==
The song was written while the band was working on their third album, and was then recorded during the Starcatcher sessions in 2022. They debuted the song on March 24, 2023, during their "Dreams in Gold Tour", and the track was released to the public on June 7, 2023, on digital media as a promotional single.

== Composition ==
The song runs for four minutes and twenty-nine seconds. The song is in the key of G major and is in the 4/4 time signature. The main chords of the song are D, C, G, and A♯. The song has been described as a bridge from the group's second album, The Battle at Garden's Gate, and their third album, Starcatcher, with comparisons being drawn to the song "Broken Bells" due to the similar ending vocals.

Lyrically the song is a metaphorical ending to the album, with the title bidding farewell to the listener. Bassist Sam Kiska stated: "On ‘Farewell For Now’ we express the sentiment of our longing to stay on stage and savour the magic created by the audience-music phenomena. But we must pack up and go to the next place to do it all over again; as always, we'll be back soon".

== Reception ==
The song has been met with mostly positive reviews. The magazine WhenTheHornBlows raved about the song saying this "Listening to this single made me imagine how incredible it is going to sound live, with the glitzy guitar solo and lead singer Josh's killer vocals and classic screams - only to find out it exists!"

OffTheRecordPress praised the song, saying "'Farewell for Now' is a heartfelt song with a guitar solo, elevated bass, and elegant vocals, you’ll want to add to your music library".

== Personnel ==
Greta Van Fleet

- Joshua Kiszka – vocals, background vocals
- Jacob Kiszka – guitar, backing vocals
- Samuel Kiszka – bass guitar, keyboards, background vocals
- Daniel Wagner – drums, background vocals

Technical

- Dave Cobb – production
- Greg Gordon – engineering
- Phillip Smith – additional engineering
- Greg Gordon – mixing
- Dave Cobb – mixing
- Pete Lyman – mastering

== Charts ==
Chart (2023)	Peak position
France Radio Top 100 Rock Songs (MyTuner)	33
US Hard Rock Digital Song Sales (Billboard)	19
