= Three Angels Broadcasting Network =

U.S. religious broadcasting network

- Founded: November 15, 1984
- Founder: Danny and Linda Shelton
- Headquarters: West Frankfort, IL
- Location: United States
- Region served: Worldwide
- Products: Television, Radio, Christian music recording, OTT video streaming platform, Video on Demand
- President: Greg Morikone
- Vice President: Jill Morikone
- Website: 3abn.org

The Three Angels Broadcasting Network (3ABN) is an American Christian media television and radio network which broadcasts Seventh-day Adventist religious, music, health, lifestyle and public affairs programming, based in West Frankfort, Illinois. Although it is not formally tied to any particular church or denomination, much of its programming focuses on Seventh-day Adventist theology and Adventist doctrine.

== History ==
In 1984, Three Angels Broadcasting Network was founded by Danny Shelton and his second wife Linda Shelton in West Frankfort, Illinois. In July 2017, 3ABN announced the sale of 60 low-powered television (LPTV) stations and 10 LPTV construction permits to Edge Spectrum. In October 2017, 3ABN announced the sale of 14 LPTV stations to HC2 Holdings. In September 2019, Danny Shelton resigned as president, though he remains a central figure and the highest paid person at the network.

== Programming ==
The stated goal of 3ABN's programming is a blend of family and social programs, health and lifestyle, gospel music, and a wide variety of Bible-based presentations.

3ABN maintains several distinct subchannels, separated by language and format:

- 3ABN (the flagship service with a mixture of programs from the other subchannels)
- 3ABN Proclaim! (all-televangelism)
- 3ABN Latino Network (Spanish language)
- 3ABN Latino Radio Network (Spanish language)
- 3ABN Radio Network
- 3ABN Radio Music Channel
- 3ABN Russia (Russian language)
- 3ABN Russia Radio Network (Russian language)
- 3ABN Français Network (French language)
- 3ABN International Network (partial simulcast of the main 3ABN with some foreign SDA ministry programming)
- 3ABN Dare to Dream Network ("urban Christian lifestyle")
- 3ABN Kids Network (children's programming, also covers the network's E/I liabilities)
- 3ABN Praise Him Music Network (worship music)
- 3ABN Canada Network (partial simulcast of the main 3ABN with some SDA ministry programming produced in Canada)
- 3ABN Australia Radio Network
- 3ABN Plus (3ABN+) live streaming broadcasts of all 3ABN television and radio networks with videos on demand, and so much more, and the subscription is free
- 3ABN also distributes the audio programming of Radio 74 Internationale over its stations

As of early 2009, 3ABN's main TV channel had 69% original programming; 3ABN Latino had 67% original programming; and 3ABN Russia had 100% original programming.

The 3ABN International network has the same/similar lineup of programs as 3ABN's flagship network. 3ABN International carries "3ABN Now", the flagship program and some other programming produced by 3ABN Australia.

Not only 3ABN produced their programming at their World Headquarters in West Frankfort, Illinois, 3ABN also produces and carries their programming in their world branches at Three Angels Russian Evangelism Centre in Nizhny Novgorod in Russia and 3ABN Australia Production Centre in Morisset, New South Wales in Australia.

== Availability ==
3ABN television networks are available viewing worldwide through various ways and platforms like international satellites including DISH Network (United States), local downlink stations, and over-the-air stations (United States), cable television, Internet, YouTube, Facebook, 3ABN+ app with Apple and Android mobile devices, Roku, Amazon Fire TV, Smart TVs, Android TV, Apple TV (4th and 5th Generation and future), 3ABN networks are available via FaithStream (Australia), MySDATV, Interless Box by MySDATV, Verizon FiOS, Skitter TV, Truli, Transvision NetWork (France, Antilles-Guyana and Reunion), VAST Satellite (Australia), Sky Cable (Philippines), and Cignal (Philippines), and MyTVToGo (worldwide). 3ABN radio networks are available listening through local radio stations, international satellites, 3ABN+ app with Apple and Android mobile devices, MyTuner Radio, Roku, Amazon Fire TV, Apple TV, Smart TVs, Android TV. 3ABN radio networks are available on MySDATV, Interless Box by MySDATV, FaithStream (Australia) FaithStream and the Internet.

== Controversies ==
In 2004, co-founder Linda Shelton left the network after the couple accused each other of cheating, and then that same year co-founder and then president Danny Shelton filed for a divorce.

On July 19, 2010, Tommy Shelton, the brother of Danny Shelton and a former 3ABN production manager, turned himself in to police in Fairfax County, Virginia, and pleaded guilty to two felony counts of taking indecent liberties with a child. Shelton's attorneys and Fairfax prosecutors agreed to a plea deal in which he would serve probation. However, a judge doubted Shelton's alleged remorse and rejected the plea deal. On January 24, 2012, Shelton reached a second plea deal shortly before his scheduled trial, in which he entered Alford pleas on all four of the molestation charges brought against him. On February 24, 2012, Shelton was sentenced to six years in prison.

On June 20, 2011, a lawsuit was filed against 3ABN on behalf of one of Shelton's accusers at the United States District Court for the Southern District of Illinois, claiming that the network was negligent in how it handled the allegations against Tommy Shelton.

Since 2011, 3ABN has been a party in a land dispute in the Bahamas, wherein a visually impaired man stated he had attempted to donate one to two acres for the construction of a church sanctuary, while 3ABN stated that he had in fact signed away full control of his 400 acres (162 ha) of land through an irrevocable charitable trust agreement. The dispute is pending in the Supreme Court of the Bahamas.

On December 31, 2018, the network fired Brenda Walsh, host of the show Kids Time. Later in February 2019, the network released a video on their Facebook and YouTube channels accusing her of mishandling money that was being raised for a children's network in Collegedale, Tennessee. The network never gave the $2 million to her ministry that had been raised, even though they had promised to do so in a separation agreement.

== See also ==
- Seventh-day Adventist Church
- Three Angels' Messages
