= Jayler =

British Rock Band

Jayler are a British rock band formed in the West Midlands in 2022. The band consists of James Bartholomew, Tyler Arrowsmith, Ricky Hodgkiss and Ed Evans. Their music incorporates classic rock, blues rock and hard rock influences and has drawn comparisons with bands including Led Zeppelin. Their debut album, Voices Unheard, was released by Silver Lining Music on 29 May 2026 and reached number 99 on the UK Albums Chart.

== History ==
=== Formation ===
Jayler originated after guitarist Tyler Arrowsmith met singer and guitarist James Bartholomew at an open-mic night in November 2021, where they performed songs by Led Zeppelin, AC/DC and the Darkness. Bartholomew had previously met drummer Ed Evans and bassist Ricky Hodgkiss while attending college, and the four musicians later began playing together.

The band's name combines the first names of James and Tyler. It was first used when Tyler's father shortened their names to "Jayler" on an open-mic performance board. The group formed in 2022, with Evans and Hodgkiss completing the line-up in 2023.

=== Voices Unheard and touring ===
Jayler announced their debut album, Voices Unheard, in February 2026. It was released on 29 May 2026 through Silver Lining Music and included the singles "Riverboat Queen", "Down Below" and "Need Your Love". The release was supported by a series of album-launch performances and in-store signing sessions across the United Kingdom.

The band gained attention in Brazil after one of its social-media videos received 123 million views in the country. This led to appearances at Monsters of Rock Brazil and as support for Lynyrd Skynyrd. Jayler were subsequently announced as support for Deep Purple's European tour and Sammy Hagar's UK dates in 2026.

== Chart performance ==
Voices Unheard reached number 99 on the UK Albums Chart. It also peaked at number three on the UK Rock & Metal Albums Chart, number five on the UK Independent Albums Chart and number two on the UK Independent Album Breakers Chart.

== Musical style ==
Jayler's music has been described as classic rock, blues rock and hard rock, with the band also discussing pop-rock and folk elements within its music. Their sound has frequently been compared with Led Zeppelin and Greta Van Fleet, while the members have cited influences including Black Sabbath, AC/DC, Van Halen, Free and The Who.

== Critical reception ==
Voices Unheard received positive reviews for its energy, musicianship and combination of classic and contemporary rock influences. Rock News described it as a confident debut and praised its natural, unpolished sound.

Kerrang! awarded the album three out of five stars, highlighting its rhythm-and-blues roots, guitar work and the band's individual interpretation of classic rock.

Über Röck praised the album's direct and energetic approach, as well as its confidence in following its own musical direction.

== Members ==
- James Bartholomew – lead vocals, guitar and harmonica
- Tyler Arrowsmith – guitar and backing vocals
- Ricky Hodgkiss – bass guitar and keyboards
- Ed Evans – drums

== Discography ==
=== Studio albums ===
- Voices Unheard (2026)

=== Selected singles ===
- "Lovemaker”
- "Riverboat Queen”
- "Bittersweet”
- "Down Below”
- "Need Your Love”
- "Hate to See It End”
