= The Weight of Dreams =

Song by Greta Van Fleet

from the album The Battle at Garden's Gate
- Written: 2019
- Released: April 16, 2021
- Recorded: 2021
- Genre: Progressive rock
- Length: 8:51
- Songwriters: Jake Kiszka; Josh Kiszka; Sam Kiszka; Danny Wagner
- Lyricist: Josh Kiszka

"The Weight of Dreams" is a song by American rock band Greta Van Fleet. It was released on their second album The Battle at Garden's Gate in 2021. While not originally released as a single, the song peaked at number 25 on the Billboard Hot Hard Rock Songs chart and was named by TotalGuitar as containing the greatest guitar solo of the 21st century.

== Background ==
The song was written and recorded during The Battle at Garden's Gates sessions in 2019. The song was released as the last song on the band's second studio album. Despite not being released as a single, the song reached number 25 on the Billboard Hot Hard Rock Songs chart.

== Composition ==
At eight minutes and fifty-one seconds, the song is the longest Greta Van Fleet song as of Starcatcher. Towards the end of the song, guitarist Jake Kiska performs a guitar solo that has been renowned as one of the best of the 21st century and on the album.

== Reception ==
Professional ratings
Review scores
Source	Rating
Album Review Database	90/100
Best Ever Albums	75/100

In 2023, the song was named by TotalGuitar as containing the best Guitar solo of the 21st century.

== Personnel ==
Greta Van Fleet

- Joshua Kiszka – vocals, background vocals
- Jacob Kiszka – guitar, backing vocals
- Samuel Kiszka – bass, keyboards, background vocals
- Daniel Wagner – drums, background vocals

Additional musicians

- Jacob Braun – cello
- Alma Fernandez – viola
- Charlie Bisharat – violin
- Songa Lee – violin

Technical

- Greg Kurstin – production, engineering
- Mark "Spike" Stent – mixing
- Julian Burg – engineering
- Alex Pasco – engineering
- Matt Wolach – mixing assistance
- Matt Tuggle – recording assistance
- Peter Luretig – recording assistance
- Brian Rajaratnam – recording assistance

== Charts ==
Chart performance for "The Weight of Dreams"
Chart (2021)	Peak position
US Hot Hard Rock Songs (Billboard)	25
