= The Indigo Streak =

2023 song by Greta Van Fleet

Single by Greta Van Fleet

from the album Starcatcher
- Released: July 21, 2023
- Recorded: 2021–2022
- Length: 4:04
- Label: Republic
- Songwriters: Jake Kiszka; Josh Kiszka; Sam Kiszka; Danny Wagner; Dave Cobb
- Producer: Dave Cobb

Greta Van Fleet singles chronology
"Farewell for Now" (2023)	"The Indigo Streak" (2023)

"The Indigo Streak" is a song by American rock band Greta Van Fleet. It is the sixth track from their third album, Starcatcher.

== Background ==
The song was written while the band was working on their third album, and was then recorded during the Starcatcher sessions in 2022. They debuted the song on March 29, 2023, during their "Dreams in Gold Tour", and the track was released to the public on July 20, 2023, on digital media, one day before the release of the full album.

== Composition and themes ==
Square One Magazine reviewed the song saying; "The Indigo Streak is a stripped back, simpler than usual track for Greta Van Fleet, and plows forward with a simple purpose, employing an excellent riff and pounding drums along with a wailing of “Into the Ether” in the chorus to drive the song into listeners minds and get them nodding or thrashing along."

== Release and reception ==
The song was released one day before the release of Starcatcher as a visualizer on YouTube, however, the song was fully released to music streaming platforms on July 21, 2023. The song was met with praise for the songs drive and melodic approach, drawing similarities to a more psychedelic rock feel.

== Personnel ==
Greta Van Fleet

- Joshua Kiszka – vocals, background vocals
- Jacob Kiszka – guitar, backing vocals
- Samuel Kiszka – bass guitar, keyboards, background vocals
- Daniel Wagner – drums, background vocals

Technical

- Dave Cobb – production
- Greg Gordon – engineering
- Phillip Smith – additional engineering
- Spike Stent – mixing engineer
- Matt Wolach – mixing
- Pete Lyman – mastering

== Charts ==
Chart (2023)	Peak position
US Hot Hard Rock Songs (Billboard)	17
