= St. Lucia FM =

Radio station in St. Lucia

- Castries; Saint Lucia
- Frequency: 97.3 MHz

Ownership
- Owner: Government of Saint Lucia

History
- First air date: 1 January 1972
- Former names: Radio St. Lucia
- Former frequencies: 97.7 MHz (South)

Technical information
- ERP: 2,000 watts

Links
- Webcast: mytuner-radio.com

St. Lucia FM formerly known as Radio St. Lucia is a radio station on Saint Lucia, located on the Morne Castries.

Radio St. Lucia operated from 1972 to 31 July 2017. For a long period it was the only radio station on the island. The government shut the station down on 31 July 2017 citing financial losses and unpaid taxes.

On 1 August 2025, the same frequency (97.3) has been revived by the local government under the rebranded name, Saint Lucia FM. In addition to the relaunch of the radio station, Saint Lucia FM is publicly available on the MyTuner Radio app. The station features local music, national events, political discussions and other programming to Saint Lucians.
