= Feet Fall Heavy =

Studio album by Kill It Kid
- Released: 19 September 2011
- Studio: Fortress Studio, Shoreditch, UK
- Length: 35:52
- Label: One Little Independent
- Producer: Leo Abrahams

Kill It Kid chronology
Kill It Kid (2009)	Feet Fall Heavy (2011)	You Owe Nothing (2014)

Professional ratings
Review scores
Source	Rating
Classic Rock	4.5/5 stars

Feet Fall Heavy is the second studio album by English alternative rock band Kill It Kid. It was released on 19 September 2011 by One Little Independent Records.

== Production ==
The album was recorded at Fortress Studios in Shoreditch, UK, with producer Leo Abrahams over a period of ten days.

== Track listing ==
Feet Fall Heavy track listing
No.	Title	Length
1.	"You're in My Blood"	4:16
2.	"Heart Rested With You"	3:33
3.	"Wild and Wasted Waters"	4:49
4.	"Pray on Me 5"	3:22
5.	"Dark Hearted Songbird"	4:07
6.	"Run"	2:33
7.	"Sweetness Has a Hold On"	2:36
8.	"Sweet Nothings"	2:36
9.	"Home"	3:25
10.	"Let My Feet Fall Heavy"	4:35

iTunes deluxe version
No.	Title	Length
11.	"Pray on Me" (Radio edit)	2:04
12.	"Lord Hear Me Now"	2:06
13.	"Wild and Wasted Waters" (Radio edit)	2:56
14.	"All to Me"	3:47
15.	"Roll and the Blade" (Demo)	2:49

== Personnel ==
Musicians

- Chris Turpin – guitar, vocals
- Stephanie Ward – piano, vocals
- Marc Jones – drums, vocals
- Adam Timmins – bass, guitar, vocals

Production

- Leo Abrahams – producer
- Charlie Francis – engineer, mixing
