= Kill It Kid =

English alternative rock band

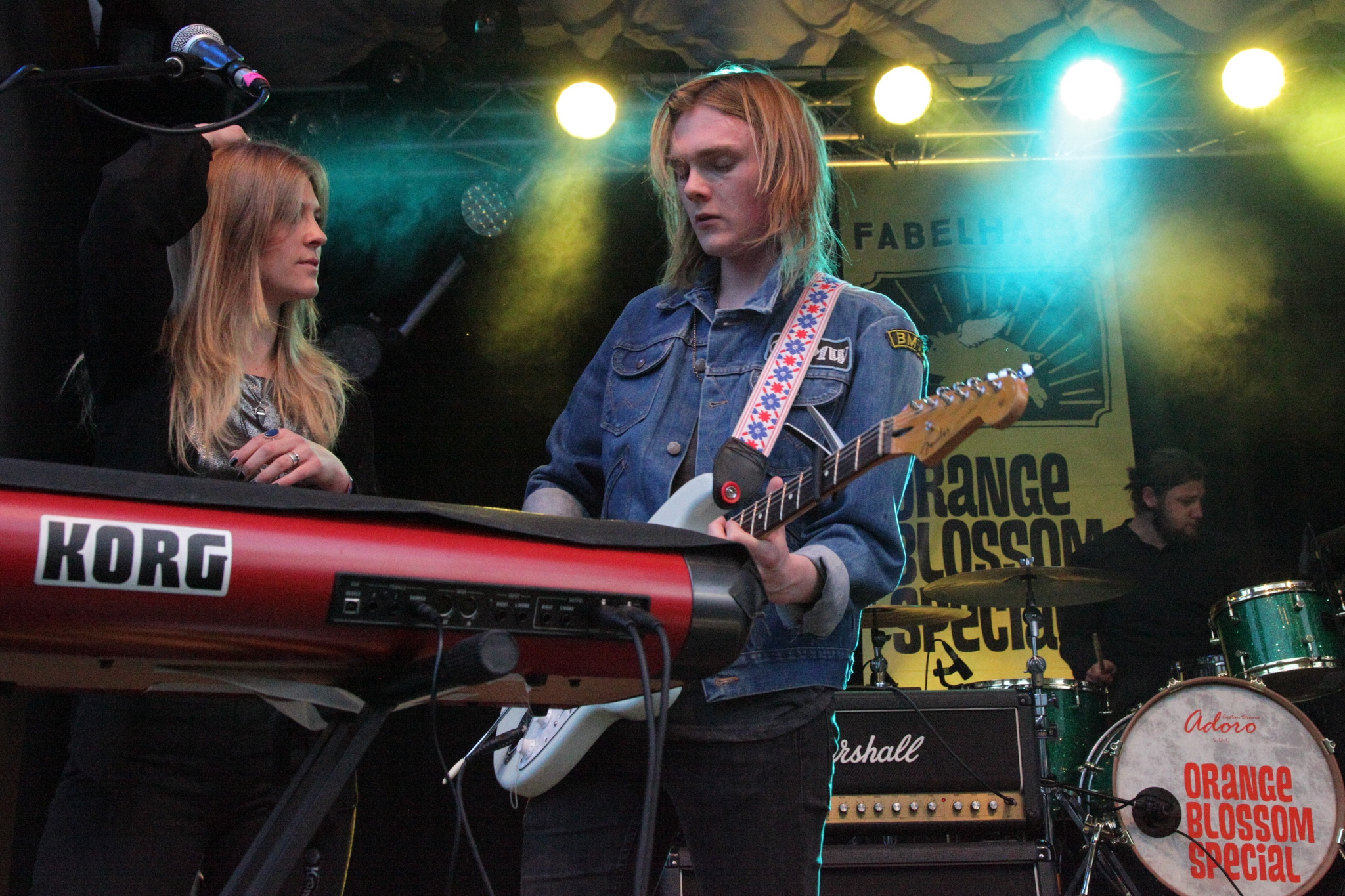
- Kill It Kid performing in 2015

Background information
- Origin: Bath, England
- Genres: Alternative rock; blues; grunge
- Years active: 2008–2015
- Labels: One Little Indian; EMI; Sire
- Past members: Chris Turpin; Stephanie Ward; Marc MacNab-Jack; Richard Jones; Adam Timmins; Dom Kozubik
- Website: www.killitkid.com

Kill It Kid was an English alternative rock band fronted by Chris Turpin on guitars and vocals. Members also include Stephanie Ward, on keys and vocals, Marc MacNab-Jack on drums and Dom Kozubik on bass guitar.

The band was widely recognised as one of the best new acts of 2009, with Clash rating their debut album 9/10.

== Influences and sound ==
Kill it Kid originally blended roots, rock and blues led by vocals from both Chris Turpin and Stephanie Ward; their line-up has included slide guitar, fiddle and on rare occasion banjo. Although the band never really saw their music as folk, the band were initially linked to the British nu-folk revival.

The sound on their second album, Feet Fall Heavy (2011), was compared to bands like The White Stripes. Chris Turpin describes the change in a 2011 interview:

It's an entirely different record, it almost feels like a different band, to be honest. It's just the reality of living and working in the music industry for two years and turning into a family band. You all become siblings which is a bit peculiar after like, the seventeenth day on the road. The main difference is there's no violin and there's no acoustic guitars, it's a much heavier process.

The band are influenced by blues and folk music; the band is named after the Blind Willie McTell song Kill it Kid.

== History ==
=== Formation ===
Kill it Kid met and formed in Bath, where its original band members lived, most of whom were students at Bath Spa University. According to vocalist Chris Turpin, in an interview in 2011:

I was gigging on my own doing solo pre war acoustic blues, Steph was doing similar on the other side of the scale, Bessie Smith and all the early female blues. We started playing together in different little groups, I was playing behind her in some jazz concerts and she had come to see my shows. Mark saw me at a solo gig, he backed me at some gigs. we then decided to get everyone in a room together.

In February 2008, a tutor at the university invited John Parish, the producer of PJ Harvey and Eels, to discuss recording with Chris, Marc and Steph. He took a group into the studio while students watched, "we sat and slogged for 12-hour days singing over and over again trying to get these songs right whilst 20 or so students sat the other room listening" explained Chris Turpin. "It was a bit strange – I don't know if there was tutoring going on or what." The finished product became their debut EP, which drew increasing label interest.

=== Success and breakthrough ===
Kill It Kid were signed to One Little Indian Records three months later and began touring the UK. In January 2009 they went to Seattle to record their debut album with producer Ryan Hadlock, (Foo Fighters, The Gossip, The Strokes) in Bear Creek Studios In 2009, they released their self-titled debut album to critical acclaim. The album was subsequently nominated for XFM's New Music Award 2010.

Kill it Kid's second album, Feet Fall Heavy (2011) was produced by Leo Abrahams and recorded at Fortress Studios in Shoreditch over a period of ten days; it features samples of Alan Lomax field recordings, and has received widespread critical acclaim. Feet Fall Heavy was to be released on 19 September 2011 but distribution was disrupted after rioters set fire to and destroyed a Sony warehouse in Enfield, North London (used by independent-music distributor PIAS) in which most of the existing physical copies of the album were being stored (see: 2011 England riots).

The band signed a publishing deal with EMI Music in September 2011. In late 2012 the band signed a recording contract with Seymour Stein, singing to his label Sire Records. The band headed to Los Angeles in the spring of 2013, to begin work on their third studio album You Owe Nothing, released in 2014). On 13 November 2015, the members of the band announced they were taking a break from Kill It Kid.

Kill it Kid have toured the UK and Ireland extensively as well as throughout Europe, with occasional US appearances. They have played festivals including South by Southwest, and Hop Farm in 2010 (headlined by Bob Dylan).

Their song Run featured on the 2013 Samsung commercial "Charge" Directed by Romain Gavras. The commercial depicts a man sitting on a beach with scenes from multiple movies rushing at him before he uses voice and motion control to select a movie.

=== Break ===
On 13 November 2015 they announced on their Facebook fan page that they will be taking an indefinite break. Chris Turpin and Stephanie Jean from the band posted that they got married in December 2016. As of 2019 Kill It Kid has been completely dissolved and former members Chris Turpin and Stephanie Jean have created a new band called Ida Mae. Meanwhile, drummer Marc went on to drum for Reef, The Heavy, James Arthur and is full time drummer for Band of Skulls.

== Members ==
=== Current ===
- Chris Turpin – guitar, vocals
- Stephanie Ward – piano, vocals
- Marc MacNab-Jack – drums
- Dom Kozubik – bass, from 2011

=== Former ===
- Richard Jones – violin, backing vocals. Left band in 2011. Credits: Burst its Banks (EP); Kill It Kid
- Adam Timmins – bass, banjo. Left band in 2011. Credits: Burst its Banks (EP); Kill It Kid; Feet Fall Heavy

== Discography ==
=== Studio albums ===
- Kill it Kid (2009) – One Little Indian Records
- Feet Fall Heavy (2011)
- You Owe Nothing (2014) – Sire Records

=== Live albums ===
- Live From Good Luck Studio (2011) – One Little Indian Records
- Abbey Road (2014) – Sire Records

=== EPs ===
- Burst Its Banks (2008)

=== Singles and EPs ===
- Send Me an Angel Down (2009) – One Little Indian Records
- Burst Its Banks (2009)
- Heaven Never Seemed So Close (2009)
- Pray on Me (2011)
- Wild & Wasted Waters (2011)
- Caroline (2014) – Sire Records
- Blood Stop And Run (2015) (Note: Reached nr. 20 on US Mainstream Rock Songs)
