= Lover, Leaver =

Single by Greta Van Fleet

from the album Anthem of the Peaceful Army
- Released: May 9, 2019
- Recorded: 2018
- Genre: Hard rock; blues rock
- Length: 3:35 (single version); 6:01 (album version)
- Label: Republic
- Songwriter(s): Joshua Michael Kiszka; Jacob Thomas Kiszka; Samuel Francis Kiszka; Daniel Robert Wagner
- Producer(s): Marlon Young; Al Sutton; Herschel Boone

Greta Van Fleet singles chronology
"You're the One" (2018)	"Lover, Leaver" (2019)	"My Way, Soon" (2020)

"Lover, Leaver" is a song by American rock band Greta Van Fleet. It was released as the third single from their debut studio album, Anthem of the Peaceful Army. It peaked at number three on the Billboard Mainstream Rock chart in June 2019. Two versions of the song were released: the full six-minute version called "Lover, Leaver (Taker, Believer)", and a shorter edit as a single called "Lover, Leaver".

== Background ==
The song had been performed in a live setting throughout 2018. The song's studio version was first released on September 24, 2018, almost a month ahead of its respective album, Anthem of the Peaceful Army, as a promotional song. It was the third promotional song to be released from the album, after single "When the Curtain Falls" and track "Watching Over".

The song was co-written by all four members of the band, and recorded in 2018 in Blackbird Studios in Nashville and Rustbelt Studios in Royal Oak, Michigan. Two incarnations of the song exist; "Lover, Leaver" a three-minute version of the song later released as the band's third single from the album, and "Lover, Leaver (Taker, Believer)", a six-minute version of the song, with an extended psychedelic jamming/improvisational outro. Both versions are available on the digital version of the album, while the physical album release only contains the extended version as track number five.

== Themes and composition ==
Journalists described the song's genre as hard rock, with having classic rock influences. Musically, it was described as having "crunch guitars" and "psychedelic melodies". Josh Kiszka's vocals were described as "emotive crooning" with moments of "skyscraping falsetto". Lyrically, the song covers topics commonly covered in classic rock – love of a woman, and dealings with the devil.

== Reception ==
Loudwire ranked the song as the ninth-best hard rock song of 2018. The website also noted that live performances had generally received a positive response from crowds as well.

In 2020, the song won "Outstanding National Single" from the Detroit Music Awards.

== Personnel ==
Band

- Joshua Kiszka – vocals
- Jacob Kiszka – guitar
- Samuel Kiszka – bass guitar
- Daniel Wagner – drums

== Charts ==
Chart performance for "Lover, Leaver"
Chart (2018)	Peak position
US Hot Rock & Alternative Songs (Billboard)	32
US Rock & Alternative Airplay (Billboard)	19
