= Built by Nations =

Single by Greta Van Fleet

from the album The Battle at Garden's Gate
- Released: April 16, 2021
- Recorded: 2019
- Genre: Hard rock
- Length: 3:58.
- Label: Republic
- Songwriters: Jake Kiszka; Josh Kiszka; Sam Kiszka; Danny Wagner

Greta Van Fleet singles chronology
"Broken Bells" (2021)	"Built by Nations" (2021)	"Meeting the Master" (2023)

"Built By Nations" is a song by American rock band Greta Van Fleet. It is the fifth and final single from their second album, The Battle at Garden's Gate. The song reached number six on the Billboard Mainstream Rock chart.

== Background ==
The song was written and recorded during The Battle at Garden's Gates sessions in 2019. On April 16, the band released the song as the final single off their sophomore album. The song was also played on July 27, when it was released as a live recording of the band playing the song.

== Composition ==
In an interview with the band, they stated that the song is about "when boys go to war", adding: "A mutiny that chronicles a unit of bewildered, young renegade soldiers, as they march into the mouth of hell. “Built by Nations” delves into challenging themes such as military moguls, the manufacturing of killing machines, and the spirit of a warrior."

== Reception ==
The single was met with mostly positive reviews. Variety described the song as "A slower song, with a quasi-philosophical titles" RiffMagazine said "Guitarist Jake Kiszka still seems to be paying homage to Page, both with his delicately strummed with his scorching lead work on songs like "Built by Nations"".

== Personnel ==
Greta Van Fleet

- Joshua Kiszka – vocals, background vocals
- Jacob Kiszka – guitar, backing vocals
- Samuel Kiszka – bass, keyboards, background vocals
- Daniel Wagner – drums, background vocals

Technical

- Greg Kurstin – production, engineering
- Mark "Spike" Stent – mixing
- Julian Burg – engineering
- Alex Pasco – engineering
- Matt Wolach – mixing assistance
- Matt Tuggle – recording assistance
- Peter Luretig – recording assistance
- Brian Rajaratnam – recording assistance

== Charts ==
Chart (2021)	Peak position
US Hot Hard Rock Songs (Billboard)	10
US Rock & Alternative Airplay (Billboard)	13
US Mainstream Rock (Billboard)	6
Canada Rock (Billboard)	45
