= Heat Above =

Single by Greta Van Fleet

from the album The Battle at Garden's Gate
- Released: February 10, 2021
- Recorded: 2019
- Length: 5:42
- Label: Republic
- Songwriters: Jake Kiszka; Josh Kiszka; Sam Kiszka; Danny Wagner

Greta Van Fleet singles chronology
"Age of Machine" (2020)	"Heat Above" (2021)	"Broken Bells" (2021)

"Heat Above" is a song by American rock band Greta Van Fleet. It is the third single from the album The Battle at Garden's Gate. The song reached number three on the Billboard Mainstream Rock chart.

== Background ==
Josh Kiszka, the band's singer, said he first wrote the lyrics for this song in 2015 before finalizing them five years later. The song became the bridge between the band's first and second albums. The song was recorded during The Battle at Garden's Gate sessions in 2019. The song's debut occurred on February 10 on the Zane Lowe Show. On February 18, the band released a music video for the song.

== Release and reception ==
The song was released as a single on digital media in February 2021. The song was met with mostly positive reviews, including a review from Consequence Sound, which said "The song’s positive vibe paired with the typically triumphant delivery of Greta Van Fleet make “Heat Above” particularly grandiose. Vocalist Josh Kiszka continues to hit the high notes with ease, and the band sounds as confident as ever, building a soaring crescendo."

== Personnel ==
Greta Van Fleet

- Joshua Kiszka – vocals, background vocals
- Jacob Kiszka – guitar, backing vocals
- Samuel Kiszka – bass, keyboards, background vocals
- Daniel Wagner – drums, background vocals

Additional musicians

- Jacob Braun – cello
- Alma Fernandez – viola
- Charlie Bisharat – violin
- Songa Lee – violin

Technical

- Greg Kurstin – production, engineering
- Mark "Spike" Stent – mixing
- Julian Burg – engineering
- Alex Pasco – engineering
- Matt Wolach – mixing assistance
- Matt Tuggle – recording assistance
- Peter Luretig – recording assistance
- Brian Rajaratnam – recording assistance

== Charts ==
Chart performance for "Heat Above"
Chart (2021)	Peak position
Canada Rock (Billboard)	12
Italy Top 100 Rock Songs (MyTuner)	41
San Marino (SMRRTV Top 50)	36
US Hot Rock & Alternative Songs (Billboard)	27
US Rock Airplay (Billboard)	13
US Mainstream Rock (Billboard)	3

== Certifications ==
Region	Certification	Certified units/sales
Brazil (Pro-Música Brasil)	Gold	20,000^{‡}
United States (RIAA)	Gold	500,000^{‡}
^{‡} Sales+streaming figures based on certification alone.
