= The Falling Sky =

Single by Greta Van Fleet

from the album Starcatcher
- Written: 2021
- Released: June 27, 2023
- Recorded: 2021–2022
- Genre: Blues rock
- Length: 3:39
- Label: Republic
- Songwriters: Jake Kiszka; Josh Kiszka; Sam Kiszka; Danny Wagner; Dave Cobb
- Producer: Dave Cobb

Greta Van Fleet singles chronology
"Farewell for Now" (2023)	"The Falling Sky" (2023)	"Play Your Games" (2026)

"The Falling Sky" is a song by American rock band Greta Van Fleet. It was released as the third single from their third album, Starcatcher.

== Background ==
The song was written while the band was working on their third album and recorded during the Starcatcher sessions in 2022. They debuted the song on March 24, 2023, during their Dreams in Gold Tour, and the track was released to the public on June 27, 2023, on digital media.

== Live performances ==
The song was performed during the Dreams in Gold Tour and the Starcatcher Tour.

== Composition ==
Guitarist Jake Kiska said "'The Falling Sky' demonstrates the darkness and barbarity in a world filled with such duality. In essence, a reminder of the complexity of the human soul and all it is capable of enduring; a letter of love written to the rising sun."

The song features a harmonica solo from vocalist Josh Kiszka in the bridge of the song.

== Reception ==
The song reached number 22 on the Billboard Mainstream Rock chart. In its review of the song, TheMusicalHype said "'The Falling Sky' isn't perfect but the energy and intensity throughout the course of the record is undeniable."

== Personnel ==
Greta Van Fleet

- Joshua Kiszka – vocals, background vocals
- Jacob Kiszka – guitar, background vocals
- Samuel Kiszka – bass guitar, keyboards, background vocals
- Daniel Wagner – drums, background vocals

Technical

- Dave Cobb – production
- Greg Gordon – engineering
- Phillip Smith – additional engineering
- Greg Gordon – mixing
- Dave Cobb – mixing
- Pete Lyman – mastering

== Charts ==
Chart (2023)	Peak position
Italian Radio Top 100 Rock Songs (MyTuner)	1
US Mainstream Rock (Billboard)	9
Nigerian Apple Music Top 100 Rock Songs (Apple Music)	47
