= Meeting the Master =

2023 song by Greta Van Fleet

Single by Greta Van Fleet

from the album Starcatcher
- Released: April 7, 2023
- Recorded: 2022
- Length: 5:12
- Label: Republic
- Songwriters: Jake Kiszka; Josh Kiszka; Sam Kiszka; Danny Wagner; Dave Cobb
- Producer: Dave Cobb

Greta Van Fleet singles chronology
"Built by Nations" (2021)	"Meeting the Master" (2023)	"Sacred the Thread" (2023)

"Meeting the Master" is a song by American rock band Greta Van Fleet. It was released as the first single from their third album, Starcatcher.

== Background ==
The song was written while the band was working on their third album, and was then recorded during the Starcatcher sessions in 2022. They debuted the song on March 24, 2023, during their "Dreams in Gold Tour", and the track was released to the public on April 7, 2023, on digital media.

== Composition and themes ==
Melodic Magazine reviewed the song saying "Liquid-like riffs, powerhouse vocals and billowing percussion make 'Meeting the Master' a proper introduction to Starcatcher and its existential themes." "'Meeting the Master' peers into an esoteric world heeded by the word of a wise teacher," the band explained in a statement. "Sung in the voice of a devout believer, and eventual group exclamation, the song details the love these fervent followers have for their teacher and their firm belief in his vision. It's an exotic spiritual journey. A dark comedy that inevitably ends in chaos."

== Release and reception ==
The song was released on digital media on April 7, 2023. The song was met with mixed reviews as some fans liked the new softer rock approach, but some wanted the band to stick to the hard rock style from their original EP Black Smoke Rising.

== Personnel ==
Greta Van Fleet

- Joshua Kiszka – vocals, background vocals
- Jacob Kiszka – guitar, backing vocals
- Samuel Kiszka – bass guitar, keyboards, background vocals
- Daniel Wagner – drums, background vocals

Technical

- Dave Cobb – production
- Greg Gordon – engineering
- Phillip Smith – additional engineering
- Greg Gordon – mixing
- Dave Cobb – mixing
- Pete Lyman – mastering

== Charts ==
Chart (2023)	Peak position
Poland Airplay (TopHit)	52
US Hot Hard Rock Songs (Billboard)	4
US Mainstream Rock (Billboard)	12
US Hot Rock & Alternative Songs (Billboard)	33
US Rock & Alternative Airplay (Billboard)	16
