= Sacred the Thread =

Promotional single by Greta Van Fleet

from the album Starcatcher
- Written: 2021
- Released: May 18, 2023
- Recorded: 2021
- Genre: Blues rock
- Length: 5:22
- Label: Republic
- Songwriters: Jake Kiszka; Josh Kiszka; Sam Kiszka; Danny Wagner; Dave Cobb
- Producer: Dave Cobb

Greta Van Fleet singles chronology
| "Meeting the Master" (2023) | "Sacred the Thread" (2023) | "Farewell for Now" (2023) |

"Sacred the Thread" is a song by American rock band Greta Van Fleet. It was released as a promotional single from their third album, Starcatcher.

== Background ==
The song was written while the band was working on their third album, and was then recorded during the Starcatcher sessions in 2022. They debuted the song on March 24, 2023, during their "Dreams in Gold Tour", and the track was released to the public on May 18, 2023, on digital media.

== Live performances ==
The song was played at the end of the Dreams in Gold Tour and has been played during the Starcatcher Tour in promotion of the album Starcatcher.

== Composition and themes ==
Lyrically, the song is a description of the clothing that the band would don at their concerts. In an interview with RockAndBluesMuse, frontman Josh Kiska said this about the song "“I always like to think that some people's first impression of Greta Van Fleet in concert is, Wow, these guys really like dressing to the left and blowing shit up. This song is particularly important to me because it’s about my jumpsuits.”

Musically, the song is the key of D Minor, and is in the 4/4 time signature. The music is described by TheHoneyPop as "A song has a heavier sound with full band instrumentals"

== Reception ==
Overall, the song was met with mixed reviews. Many fans found the vocal filter on lead singer's Josh Kiska's voice to be strange in comparison to the clear nature of the prior albums.

American Songwriter calls the track a “stunner" and praised the song for its fast-paced nature.

== Personnel ==
Greta Van Fleet

- Joshua Kiszka – vocals, background vocals
- Jacob Kiszka – guitar, backing vocals
- Samuel Kiszka – bass guitar, keyboards, background vocals
- Daniel Wagner – drums, background vocals

Technical

- Dave Cobb – production
- Greg Gordon – engineering
- Phillip Smith – additional engineering
- Greg Gordon – mixing
- Dave Cobb – mixing
- Pete Lyman – mastering

== Charts ==
| Chart (2023) | Peak position |
|---|---|
| US Hard Rock Digital Song Sales (Billboard) | 20 |
