= Ida Mae =

English alternative rock duo

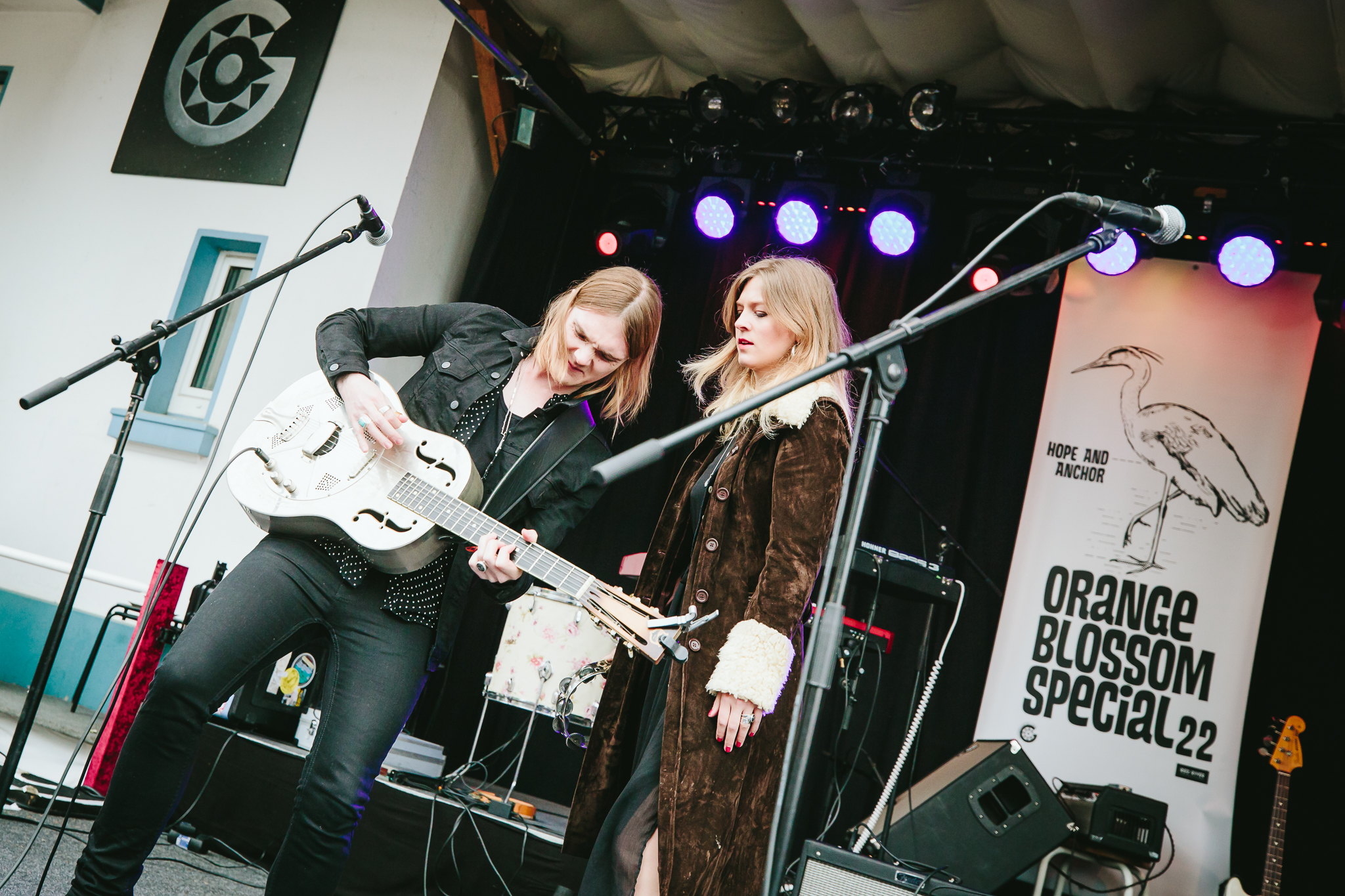

Background information
- Origin: England
- Genres: Alternative rock, blues, americana
- Years active: 2019–present
- Label: Thirty Tigers
- Members: Christopher Turpin; Stephanie Jean Ward
- Website: www.idamaemusic.com

Ida Mae is an English alternative rock duo composed of husband and wife, Chris Turpin and Stephanie Jean Ward. The duo has released three studio albums and toured with notable acts such as Greta Van Fleet, Gary Clark Jr., Brandi Carlile, Willie Nelson and Lucinda Williams.

== Career ==
Turpin and Ward met while studying in Bath, where they founded and fronted the alternative rock band Kill It Kid. After three studio albums that were received with commercial success, Kill It Kid disbanded in 2015.

After marrying in 2016, the duo recorded their debut album Chasing Lights at Real World Studios in Bath with Ethan Johns (Kings of Leon, Ray LaMontagne). The album was released on June 7, 2019, and was met with praise from Billboard and The Independent.

The success of Chasing Lights led Ida Mae to national touring opportunities with acts such as Greta Van Fleet, Willie Nelson, Alison Krauss, Marcus King, Rodrigo y Gabriela, Josh Ritter and Nick Mulvey.

The band released their second album, Click Click Domino, on July 16, 2021. The album was self-produced and included features from Marcus King and Jake Kizska from Greta Van Fleet.

Their latest album, Thunder Above You, was released on October 6, 2023. The album was recorded in less than a week with mostly live takes while Stephanie was pregnant with their first child.

== Discography ==
=== Studio albums ===
- Chasing Lights (2019)
- Click Click Domino (2021)
- Thunder Above You (2023)

=== Live albums ===
- Live in Memphis (2020)
- Live Under the Chalk Horse (2022)
