= You're the One (Greta Van Fleet song) =

Single by Greta Van Fleet

from the album Anthem of the Peaceful Army
- Released: October 16, 2018
- Recorded: 2018
- Genre: Rock
- Length: 4:25
- Label: Republic
- Songwriters: Jake Kiszka; Josh Kiszka; Sam Kiszka; Danny Wagner
- Producers: Herschel Boone; Al Sutton; Marlon Young

Greta Van Fleet singles chronology
"When the Curtain Falls" (2018)	"You're the One" (2018)	"Lover, Leaver" (2019)

"You're the One" is a song by American rock band Greta Van Fleet. It was their second single off of their first studio album Anthem of the Peaceful Army. It reached number one on the Billboard Mainstream Rock Songs chart in March 2019.

== Background ==
The song was released as the second single from the band's first studio album Anthem of the Peaceful Army on October 16, 2018, three days prior to the album's release. A live acoustic version was recorded prior for Radio.com, and released on the same day. The song was the earliest written song on the album, being written when brother Jake and Josh Kiszka were just 17 years old in 2013. The song is credited as being written by all four member of the band. Prior to the song’s release as a single, the band performed the song live in March 2018 with Elton John at his benefit for the Elton John AIDS Foundation. On January 18, 2019, the band performed the song and “Black Smoke Rising” live on Saturday Night Live. A clip of the recording of 'You're the One' went viral on TikTok for Josh Kiszka's dramatic head movements.

== Composition and themes ==
Musically, journalist described the song as a "rock ballad" and "more laid back" than much of the band's material released at the time. Jake Kiszka described the song as being inspired by the 1960s folk music revival, taking inspiration from artists such as Bob Dylan, Joni Mitchell and Joan Baez. The song was described as melodic, mid-tempo song, with a backing track of clean guitar notes, bass, drums, and organ. Beyond the common comparisons the band commonly receives to the work of Led Zeppelin, the song was also compared to the work of The Allman Brothers and Bad Company. The drumming was described as similar to the Led Zeppelin song "Your Time is Gonna Come".

Lyrically, the song was described as a "dirt-road-rambling, lovelorn tune". While generally described as a heartfelt love song about unrequited love for a female, it was also noted how at one point, the narrator describes her as young, pretty, and evil.

== Reception ==
Uproxx praised the song for having a "huge and catchy chorus that is begging to be chanted by a festival crowd" and "a gorgeous song that features a sense of timelessness that few modern rock bands could pull off."

== Personnel ==
Band

- Joshua Kiszka – vocals
- Jacob Kiszka – guitar, backing vocals
- Samuel Kiszka – bass guitar, keyboards, backing vocals
- Daniel Wagner – drums, backing vocals

== Charts ==
=== Weekly charts ===
Chart (2018–2019)	Peak position
US Hot Rock & Alternative Songs (Billboard)	12
US Rock & Alternative Airplay (Billboard)	6

=== Year-end charts ===
Chart (2019)	Position
US Hot Rock Songs (Billboard)	52

== Certifications ==
Region	Certification	Certified units/sales
Canada (Music Canada)	Gold	40,000^{‡}
United States (RIAA)	Gold	500,000^{‡}
^{‡} Sales+streaming figures based on certification alone.
