= My Way, Soon =

Single by Greta Van Fleet

from the album The Battle at Garden's Gate
- Released: October 9, 2020
- Recorded: 2019–2020
- Genre: Hard rock; blues rock
- Length: 4:15
- Label: Lava/Republic
- Producer: Greg Kurstin

Greta Van Fleet singles chronology
"Lover, Leaver" (2019)	"My Way, Soon" (2020)	"Age of Machine" (2020)

Music video
- "My Way, Soon" on YouTube

"My Way, Soon" is a song by American rock band Greta Van Fleet, released as the lead single for the band's second studio album The Battle at Garden's Gate. The track peaked at number one on the US Mainstream Rock chart. It was released alongside a music video on October 9, 2020.

== Background ==
According to the band, the track is inspired by "three years of touring", which according to Josh Kiszka, his experiences, thoughts, and changes of perspectives for the band when touring. Bassist Sam Kizka added on saying

"We've seen how people live in different parts of the world and we've developed intrinsic respect for different cultures and people. We've gone from driving down a highway to a show and seeing endless miles of shantytowns in Sao Paulo, to playing some of the richest places on earth."

== Composition ==
The song had been described as a "brisk rocker", "breezy rocker", that shifts between "a shuffle and a stomp", with bluesy guitar riffs and spindly guitar pedals over the top. The track was also called "liberating and jubilant track that celebrates and reflects the band’s personal transformation over the past three years" by the band. Overall, the track is considered very uptempo track.

== Music video ==
The video for the track was released alongside the single, edited and directed by the band. The video shows the band on stage, on the road, and behind the scenes of the tour they were on at the time.

== Personnel ==
Greta Van Fleet

- Joshua Kiszka – vocals, background vocals
- Jacob Kiszka – guitar, backing vocals
- Samuel Kiszka – bass, keyboards, background vocals
- Daniel Wagner – drums, background vocals

Technical

- Greg Kurstin – production, engineering
- Mark "Spike" Stent – mixing
- Julian Burg – engineering
- Alex Pasco – engineering
- Matt Wolach – mixing assistance
- Matt Tuggle – recording assistance
- Peter Luretig – recording assistance
- Brian Rajaratnam – recording assistance

== Charts ==
Chart (2020–2021)	Peak position
US Hot Rock & Alternative Songs (Billboard)	45
US Mainstream Rock (Billboard)	1
Belgium (Ultratip Bubbling Under Wallonia)	–
Canada Rock (Billboard)	8
