= Meet on the Ledge =

Single by Fairport Convention

from the album What We Did on Our Holidays
- B-side: "Throwaway Street Puzzle" (Hutchings/Thompson)
- Released: 29th November 1968
- Recorded: August–September 1968
- Studio: Kingsway Recorders and Olympic Studio No. 1, London
- Genre: British folk rock
- Length: 2:49
- Label: Island WIP 6047
- Songwriter: Richard Thompson
- Producer: Joe Boyd (Witchseason Productions)

Fairport Convention singles chronology
"If I Had a Ribbon Bow" (1968)	"Meet on the Ledge" (1968)	"I'll Keep It with Mine" (1969)

Official Audio
- "Meet on the Ledge" on YouTube

"Meet on the Ledge" is a song written by British singer-songwriter Richard Thompson and recorded by British folk rock band Fairport Convention in 1968 on Island Records. It was their second single.

== Background ==
The song was taken from the album What We Did on Our Holidays. The band had performed the song on the 1969 launch of From the Roundhouse, a short-lived BBC television youth and arts programme about the London "underground scene". The vocals were performed by Sandy Denny and Iain Matthews.

The song's title came from a large, low-hanging tree limb on which Richard Thompson used to play as a child, and which he and his friends had dubbed "The Ledge".

== Reception ==
Thompson has acknowledged that some people interpret "the ledge" as some sort of code for the afterlife and that it is popular at funerals. In an interview with Mojo magazine in March 2011, Thompson said: "The hardest thing about being a 17-year-old songwriter is that you're embarrassed – you're never going to write a song saying, 'These are my feelings, I love you.' So I was trying to find some semi-veiled language that conveyed something to somebody somehow but which didn't really say anything up front. It's a slightly naïve song, a little obscure. I don't even know what it means ... I had to sing it at my own mother's funeral. It was in her will. That's about the hardest thing I've ever done".

The song has become Fairport Convention's unofficial anthem. At their concerts, including the ongoing Cropredy Festival, it is often performed as the last song and a signal to fans that there will be no more encores.

A 2004 listeners poll for BBC Radio 2 placed the song at number 17 in the station's Sold On Song Top 100 songs.

== Cover versions ==
Thompson re-recorded the song as a bonus track on his 1984 solo album Small Town Romance. Fairport Convention re-recorded the song in 1987, releasing it as a track on the album In Real Time: Live '87 and as a single to tie in with the band's 20th anniversary. The title has been used for a compilation album by Fairport Convention and a book about them. It is the first track on the 1972 compilation The History of Fairport Convention.

The song was covered by British band Trapeze when they made an appearance on the British TV show Colour Me Pop on BBC2 in 1969.

'Meet on the Ledge' was covered by New Zealand rock band Tom Thumb as the B-side to their 1969 single "Witchi-Tai-To (Indian Love Chant)".

In 2012 American rock band Counting Crows recorded a version of the song for their covers album Underwater Sunshine (or What We Did on Our Summer Vacation).

In 2017 American rock band Greta Van Fleet recorded a version of the song for their second EP From the Fires.

In 2023 American rock band The Empty Pockets recorded a version of the song for their album Gotta Find the Moon.
