= Age of Machine =

Single by Greta Van Fleet

from the album The Battle at Garden's Gate
- Released: December 4, 2020
- Recorded: 2019
- Genre: Blues rock
- Length: 6:53
- Label: Republic
- Songwriters: Jake Kiszka; Josh Kiszka; Sam Kiszka; Danny Wagner

Greta Van Fleet singles chronology
"My Way, Soon" (2020)	"Age of Machine" (2020)	"Heat Above" (2021)

"Age of Machine" is a song by American rock band Greta Van Fleet. It is the second single from their second album, The Battle at Garden's Gate.

== Background ==
The song was written and recorded during The Battle at Garden's Gate sessions in 2019. The song was then released on digital media on December 4, 2020, as the second single for the band's sophomore album. The song would also be given a music video which was released six days later on December 10, 2020. The song would end up reaching number eight on the Hard Rock Digital Song Sales chart.

== Composition ==
Age of Machine is one of the longest Greta Van Fleet songs, reaching almost seven minutes in length. BandedPR reviewed the song saying this "Age of Machine is a transcendental train ride through a dark, barren tunnel. The train is rickety and you almost fear for your safety as the song hauntingly fades in, then grabs you and pulls you down a trippy, spiraling rabbit hole. For the next six minutes and fifty-three seconds, you are in a timeless space" Metal Injection talks about the song and mentions that the band seems to be very influenced by Rush in this song.

In an interview with Consequence, the band members had this to say about the song "Age of Machine is about all that lies outside. We explore the archetypes of greed, industry, the industry of war, and 21st century hypnosis. All in all, we need some healing; unplug from the source."

== Reception ==
The song was met with mostly positive reviews with BandedPR calling the song "Greta Van Fleet's Finest Piece of Work". The guitar solo in "Age of Machine" was elected by Guitar World's readers as the best of 2021.

== Personnel ==
Greta Van Fleet

- Joshua Kiszka – vocals, background vocals
- Jacob Kiszka – guitar, backing vocals
- Samuel Kiszka – bass, keyboards, background vocals
- Daniel Wagner – drums, background vocals

Technical

- Greg Kurstin – production, engineering
- Mark "Spike" Stent – mixing
- Julian Burg – engineering
- Alex Pasco – engineering
- Matt Wolach – mixing assistance
- Matt Tuggle – recording assistance
- Peter Luretig – recording assistance
- Brian Rajaratnam – recording assistance

== Charts ==
Chart (2020)	Peak position
US Hot Hard Rock Songs (Billboard)	9
