= From the Fires =

EP by Greta Van Fleet
- Released: November 10, 2017
- Recorded: 2016–2017
- Studio: Rustbelt Studios, Royal Oak, Michigan
- Genre: Hard rock; blues rock
- Length: 32:11
- Label: Lava; Republic
- Producer: Marlon Young; Al Sutton

Greta Van Fleet chronology
Black Smoke Rising (2017)	From the Fires (2017)	Anthem of the Peaceful Army (2018)

Singles from From the Fires
- 1. "Highway Tune" Released: March 31, 2017; 2. "Safari Song" Released: October 15, 2017

From the Fires is the second EP by American rock band Greta Van Fleet. It was released on November 10, 2017 through Lava and Republic Records. From the Fires won the Grammy Award for Best Rock Album at the 61st Grammy Awards.

== Background and release ==
From the Fires was first announced on October 25, 2017, to be released on November 10, 2017. The release consists of eight songs; four being newly recorded by the band, four songs originally found from their EP, Black Smoke Rising.

Having chosen songs for Black Smoke Rising that would demonstrate their range and variety, the band felt that it was "simply just not finished." As a result, they compiled four more songs that they felt tied up loose ends for From the Fires. Too busy to design the cover art like they did for Black Smoke Rising, they hired an artist for From the Fires and made suggestions.

The album was released physically and digitally, the latter being available for a discount on iTunes if the account has already purchased Black Smoke Rising. The song "Highway Tune" topped the Billboard Mainstream Rock and Active Rock charts in 2017, while "Safari Song" had peaked at number 1 on the same chart in February 2018.

== Themes and composition ==
Lyrically, all eight songs across this album and their EP all relate to the theme of basic humanity. Specifically, vocalist Josh Kiszka explained that the album’s name and cover art were inspired by the band's camping trips of their childhood:

"Our extended families and friends spent part of every summer together at a place called Yankee Springs," says Josh. "We were out in the middle of the woods, and every night, we’d sit around a campfire, play music and tell stories. I always loved that as it reminded me of ancient times when people would gather around the fires with the tribes’ elders telling fables of wisdom and courage, passing down human history. That concept is where the cover art and title come from.

The album contains two covers; a cover of Sam Cooke's 1964 song "A Change Is Gonna Come", and Fairport Convention's 1968 song "Meet on the Ledge". The former was to show the band's soul influences and the latter to have a folk song. Josh and guitarist Jake had always wanted to cover "A Change Is Gonna Come", and felt that its political importance was relevant to today and therefore time to finally do it. Herschel Boone and his wife recorded multiple chorus parts to give it the effect of a choir. From the Fires' two original songs, "Edge of Darkness" and "Talk on the Street," were written about nine months before its release. Jake briefly referred to the former as "pure rock and roll" and the latter as having a "catchy fun" element to it.

== Reception ==
Professional ratings
Aggregate scores
Source	Rating
Metacritic	64/100
Review scores
Source	Rating
AllMusic	3/5 stars
AntiHero Magazine	10/10
PopMatters	8/10 stars
The Spill Magazine	4/5

At Metacritic, which assigns a normalized rating out of 100 to reviews from mainstream critics, the EP received an average score of 64, which indicates "generally favorable reviews", based on 4 reviews. As of August 30, 2019, the EP has sold 500,000 copies in the U.S., giving it a gold certification by the RIAA.

Musically, the release was described as "Led Zeppelin for Generation Z", an influence the band mentioned in the past, specifically Robert Plant's wailing vocals and Jimmy Page's guitar riffs.

== Track listing ==
All tracks are written by Joshua Michael Kiszka, Jacob Thomas Kiszka, Samuel Francis Kiszka, and Daniel Robert Wagner, except where noted.

No.	Title	Length
1.	"Safari Song"	3:56
2.	"Edge of Darkness"	4:28
3.	"Flower Power"	5:13
4.	"A Change Is Gonna Come" (Sam Cooke cover)	3:17
5.	"Highway Tune"	3:01
6.	"Meet on the Ledge" (Fairport Convention cover)	3:50
7.	"Talk on the Street"	4:09
8.	"Black Smoke Rising"	4:21
Total length:		32:15

== Personnel ==
Greta Van Fleet

- Joshua Michael Kiszka – vocals
- Jacob Thomas Kiszka – guitar, mandolin on "Flower Power"
- Samuel Francis Kiszka – bass, organ on "Flower Power"
- Daniel Robert Wagner – drums, percussion

Production

- Marlon Young – producer, recorder and mixer
- Al Sutton – producer, recorder and mixer
- Herschel Boone – vocals producer
- Ashley Pawlak – cover artwork, art direction and design
- Kyledidthis – art direction and design

== Charts ==
=== Weekly charts ===
Chart (2017–18)	Peak position
Australian Albums (ARIA)	75
Belgian Albums (Ultratop Flanders)	102
Belgian Albums (Ultratop Wallonia)	31
Canadian Albums (Billboard)	23
Czech Albums (ČNS IFPI)	86
Dutch Albums (Album Top 100)	87
French Albums (SNEP)	100
German Albums (Offizielle Top 100)	84
Italian Albums (FIMI)	60
New Zealand Heatseeker Albums (RMNZ)	4
Polish Albums (ZPAV)	25
Scottish Albums (OCC)	95
Spanish Albums (Promusicae)	73
Swiss Albums (Schweizer Hitparade)	95
UK Americana Albums (OCC)	1
UK Rock & Metal Albums (OCC)	7
US Billboard 200	36
US Top Rock Albums (Billboard)	4
US Top Hard Rock Albums (Billboard)	1

=== Year-end charts ===
Chart (2018)	Position
Belgian Albums (Ultratop Wallonia)	128
Canadian Albums (Billboard)	44
US Billboard 200	152
US Top Rock Albums (Billboard)	18

Chart (2019)	Position
US Top Rock Albums (Billboard)	95

== Certifications ==
Region	Certification	Certified units/sales
Canada (Music Canada)	Platinum	80,000^{‡}
Italy (FIMI)	Gold	25,000^{‡}
New Zealand (RMNZ)	Gold	7,500^{‡}
Poland (ZPAV)	Platinum	20,000^{‡}
United Kingdom (BPI)	Silver	60,000^{‡}
United States (RIAA)	Gold	500,000^{‡}
^{‡} Sales+streaming figures based on certification alone.
