= Safari Song =

Single by Greta Van Fleet

from the EP Black Smoke Rising and From the Fires
- Released: October 15, 2017
- Recorded: 2016
- Genre: Hard rock; blues rock
- Length: 3:56
- Label: Lava; Republic
- Songwriters: Joshua Michael Kiszka; Jacob Thomas Kiszka; Samuel Francis Kiszka; Daniel Robert Wagner
- Producers: Al Sutton; Marlon Young

Greta Van Fleet singles chronology
"Highway Tune" (2017)	"Safari Song" (2017)	"When the Curtain Falls" (2018)

"Safari Song" is a song by American rock band Greta Van Fleet. It was their second single off of their EP Black Smoke Rising, and their compilation EP From the Fires. It topped the Billboard Mainstream Rock Songs chart in February 2018.

== Background ==
The song was initially released on the band's debut EP - Black Smoke Rising in April 2017. The song was released as the second single from the EP, after "Highway Tune", in October 2017, and was the second most added song to rock radio. Shortly afterwards, on November 10, 2017, a compilation EP, From the Fires, containing "Safari Song" and the other three songs from Black Smoke Rising, and four newly recorded songs, was released. The release of From the Fires pushed "Safari Song" to chart on the Billboard Hot Rock Songs chart at number 44, staying on the chart for four weeks.

The band performed the song live on national television on Last Call With Carson Daly on October 31, 2017.

== Themes and composition ==
The song's sound has drawn comparisons to the work of Led Zeppelin, both in the song's production sounding similar to rock music from the 1960s, and Josh Kiszka's vocals mirroring Robert Plant's "signature wail, phrasing, and articulation". Beyond the Led Zeppelin similarities, Loudwire also compared the song's vocal and guitar riff style to the work of Axl Rose of Guns N' Roses, Bon Scott of AC/DC and Mick Jagger of the Rolling Stones. Josh Kiszka said of the song's initial conception:

We were doing some writing and recording at Plymouth Rock, an old Michigan church that had been converted into a recording studio. We were playing a bunch of old blues songs and Jake [Kiszka, guitarist] came up with this riff that I fell in love with. It had this complexity, this mixture of jungle music and blues, and it made me think of a safari, hence the title. As an ode to our love of the blues, the lyrics were written as a narrative, the way that many blues lyrics have been written."

Sam Kiszka, the band's bassist, stated that the song's initial iteration was far more complicated, with more percussion and busy guitar-work in it. The band felt that they had added too many overdubs while recording the song's initial version in the studio, and ended up simplifying its composition and removing an extended drum interlude. The song's live performances often re-add a long drum solo at the end.

== Personnel ==
- Joshua Kiszka – lead vocals
- Jacob Kiszka – guitar
- Samuel Kiszka – bass guitar, keyboards
- Daniel Wagner – drums

== Charts ==
=== Weekly charts ===
Weekly chart performance for "Safari Song"
Chart (2018)	Peak position
Canada Rock (Billboard)	2
US Hot Rock & Alternative Songs (Billboard)	25
US Rock & Alternative Airplay (Billboard)	12

=== Year-end charts ===
Year-end chart performance for "Safari Song"
Chart (2018)	Position
US Hot Rock Songs (Billboard)	61
US Rock Airplay (Billboard)	49

== Certifications ==
Certifications for "Safari Song"
Region	Certification	Certified units/sales
Canada (Music Canada)	Gold	40,000^{‡}
New Zealand (RMNZ)	Gold	15,000^{‡}
United States (RIAA)	Gold	500,000^{‡}
^{‡} Sales+streaming figures based on certification alone.
