= Broken Bells (song) =

Promotional single by Greta Van Fleet

from the album The Battle at Garden's Gate
- Released: March 19, 2021
- Recorded: 2019
- Genre: Progressive rock
- Length: 5:50.
- Label: Republic
- Songwriters: Jake Kiszka; Josh Kiszka; Sam Kiszka; Danny Wagner

Greta Van Fleet singles chronology
"Heat Above" (2021)	"Broken Bells" (2021)	"Built by Nations" (2021)

"Broken Bells" is a song by American rock band Greta Van Fleet. It is the fourth single from their second album, The Battle at Garden's Gate.

== Background ==
The song was written and recorded during The Battle at Garden's Gates sessions in 2019. The song was then released on digital media on March 19, 2021, as a promotional single for the band's second album.

== Composition ==
The band has said on the social media accounts that "Broken Bells is what the fetter of society does to impact a pure and innocent soul. Our intention is to remove the obligation of generational synthetic expectations; break down these walls and not build new ones." BensBeats compares the song to the Led Zeppelin song "Stairway to Heaven" saying "The band places their most obvious "Stairway to Heaven" nod yet in the album's prime third position with "Broken Bells," copy-pasting the timeless sense of awe with slightly altered chords and running through the same structure"

In an interview with Consequence the band talked about the song saying "Broken Bells is about losing our primal innocence as we face the world. When we are brought in to this life, the soul is perfect. But when faced with the tribulations of our man-made society, the self becomes damaged working within the confines of such."

== Reception ==
The song was met with mostly positive reviews and has become one of the most highly regarded songs off of the album, Battle at Garden's Gate. BensBeats reviewed the song positively saying "Kiszka is at the height of his theatrical vocal delivery here and completely sells the chorus, sounding as though he’s choking up as he sings the final lyrics". Rolling Stone magazine reviewed the song positively calling it a "sprawling ballad".

== Personnel ==
Greta Van Fleet

- Joshua Kiszka – vocals, background vocals
- Jacob Kiszka – guitar, backing vocals
- Samuel Kiszka – bass, keyboards, background vocals
- Daniel Wagner – drums, background vocals

Additional musicians

- Jacob Braun – cello
- Alma Fernandez – viola
- Charlie Bisharat – violin
- Songa Lee – violin

Technical

- Greg Kurstin – production, engineering
- Mark "Spike" Stent – mixing
- Julian Burg – engineering
- Alex Pasco – engineering
- Matt Wolach – mixing assistance
- Matt Tuggle – recording assistance
- Peter Luretig – recording assistance
- Brian Rajaratnam – recording assistance

== Charts ==
Chart (2021)	Peak position
US Hard Rock Digital Song Sales (Billboard)	15
