= Black Smoke Rising (song) =

2017 single by Greta Van Fleet

Song by Greta Van Fleet

from the album Black Smoke Rising and From the Fires
- Recorded: 2017
- Genre: Rock
- Length: 4:21
- Label: Lava; Republic
- Songwriters: Josh Kiszka; Jake Kiszka; Sam Kiszka; Danny Wagner

"Black Smoke Rising" is a song by American rock band Greta Van Fleet. It was first released on their debut EP Black Smoke Rising in 2017, and then later released again on their double EP From the Fires in 2018. While not originally released as a single, the song charted briefly on the Billboard Mainstream Rock Songs and was nominated for the Grammy Award for Best Rock Song for the 61st Annual Grammy Awards.

== Background ==
The song was first released on the band's debut EP Black Smoke Rising, and then released again on the band's next release, the double EP From the Fires. On January 18, 2019, the band performed the song and "You're the One" live on Saturday Night Live. An acoustic version of the song would be released as a single in 2018 along with a cover of Rolling in the Deep by Adele.

== Composition and themes ==
The song has been described as traditional, guitar-driven rock song, prominently featuring Jake Kiszka's guitar riff hook and lead singer Josh Kiszka's "husky howl". At the 2:30 mark of the song, the song breaks its structure to enter a minute long interlude consisting of Joshua Kiszka's howling vocals and Jacob Kiszka's psychedelic guitar work, before returning to its final chorus. Thematically, the song was inspired by the summers by bonfires of their youth, with Josh Kiszka explaining:

When we were all kids, our extended families and friends spent part of every summer together at a place called Yankee Springs. We were out in the middle of the woods, and every night, we'd sit around a campfire, play music and tell stories. I always loved that as it reminded me of ancient times when people would gather around the fires with the tribes' elders telling fables of wisdom and courage, passing down human history. That concept is where the cover art and title come from."

== Reception ==
The song was well-received by critics. Billboard named the song the fifteenth best rock song of 2017, while PopMatters writer William Nesbit named it the best rock song of 2017.

The song received a Grammy Award nomination for the 61st Annual Grammy Awards, for Best Rock Song.

== Personnel ==
Band

- Joshua Kiszka – vocals
- Jacob Kiszka – guitar, backing vocals
- Samuel Kiszka – bass guitar, keyboards, backing vocals
- Daniel Wagner – drums, backing vocals

== Charts ==
Chart (2018)	Peak position
US Mainstream Rock (Billboard)	39

== Certifications ==
Region	Certification	Certified units/sales
Brazil (Pro-Música Brasil)	Gold	30,000^{‡}
Canada (Music Canada)	Gold	40,000^{‡}
New Zealand (RMNZ)	Gold	15,000^{‡}
United States (RIAA)	Gold	500,000^{‡}
^{‡} Sales+streaming figures based on certification alone.
