= The Battle at Garden's Gate =

Studio album by Greta Van Fleet
- Released: April 16, 2021
- Recorded: 2019–2020
- Studios: Henson (Los Angeles, California); No Expectations (Los Angeles, California)
- Length: 63:32
- Labels: Lava; Republic
- Producer: Greg Kurstin

Greta Van Fleet chronology
Anthem of the Peaceful Army (2018)	The Battle at Garden's Gate (2021)	Starcatcher (2023)

Singles from The Battle at Garden's Gate
- 1. "My Way, Soon" Released: October 9, 2020; 2. "Age of Machine" Released: December 4, 2020; 3. "Heat Above" Released: February 10, 2021; 4. "Broken Bells" Released: March 19, 2021; 5. "Built by Nations" Released: April 16, 2021

The Battle at Garden's Gate is the second studio album by American rock band Greta Van Fleet, released on April 16, 2021. The album's first single, "My Way, Soon", was released on October 9, 2020 and topped the Billboard Mainstream Rock chart in January 2021.

The album debuted at number 7 on the Billboard 200 and number 1 on the Top Hard Rock Albums and Top Rock Albums charts with first week sales of 43,000.

== Background and recording ==
The band commenced on writing material for a second studio album directly after finishing their debut album, Anthem of the Peaceful Army, which released in October 2018. As early as January 2019, bassist Sam Kiszka indicated that the album was scheduled for sometime in 2019 as well. Recording sessions occurred in a concentrated 2-month period in mid-2019. The album was recorded with musical producer Greg Kurstin, who at the time had worked with Foo Fighters on Concrete and Gold and Medicine at Midnight.

== Themes and composition ==
Early 2019 commentary from the band on the album noted that it would thematically have a "more worldly" feel than their prior work, inspired by the band's seeing the world through touring. Additionally, they aimed to create "an evolution to their sound" after their prior album received a lot of commentary, both positive and negative, of being very similar to the work of other bands such as Led Zeppelin. Upon the reveal of the album's name of The Battle at Garden's Gate in late 2020, they expanded on the themes, noting that it was "definitely a biblical reference" but that the album expanded well beyond that, into the idea of "ancient civilizations" and "parallel universe[s]". The band explores the human experience, and how religion and war affect it. The album was described as more dark, cinematic, and complicated than their prior album. Seeing dark instances of poverty and famine while touring inspired its more dire sound.

== Release and promotion ==
The band released their first single from the album, "My Way, Soon", in October 2020. The song was debuted and performed live on December 8 on The Late Show with Stephen Colbert, complete with costumes and stage setup similar to 1970s' music programs. A second song, "Age of Machine", was released in December 2020. In January, "My Way, Soon" topped the Billboard Mainstream Rock chart, their fifth song to top the chart.

== Reception ==
Professional ratings
Aggregate scores
Source	Rating
Metacritic	64/100
Review scores
Source	Rating
Allmusic	3/5 stars
Classic Rock	4/5 stars
Consequence of Sound	B
Exclaim!	7/10
Kerrang!	4/5
NME	2/5 stars
The Observer	3/5 stars
PopMatters	3/10
Rolling Stone	3/5 stars
Sputnikmusic	4.0/5

The album was featured in multiple "Most Anticipated Albums of 2021" lists, including from publications Rolling Stone, Vulture, and Ultimate Classic Rock.

The guitar solo of "Age of Machine" was elected by Guitar World's readers as the best of 2021.

A reader's poll conducted by Total Guitar magazine ranked the guitar solo from the album's concluding 9-minute epic "The Weight of Dreams" as the greatest guitar solo of the 21st century.

The album was also named the 2022 Clio Music Bronze award winner.

== Track listing ==
All tracks are written by Joshua Kiszka, Jacob Kiszka, Samuel Kiszka, Daniel Wagner, except where noted.

The Battle at Garden's Gate track listing
No.	Title	Writer(s)	Length
1.	"Heat Above"		5:40
2.	"My Way, Soon"		4:15
3.	"Broken Bells"		5:50
4.	"Built by Nations"		3:58
5.	"Age of Machine"		6:53
6.	"Tears of Rain"		3:50
7.	"Stardust Chords"	Joshua Kiszka; Jacob Kiszka; S. Kiszka; Wagner; Greg Kurstin	4:58
8.	"Light My Love"	Joshua Kiszka; Jacob Kiszka; S. Kiszka; Wagner; Kurstin	4:30
9.	"Caravel"		4:55
10.	"The Barbarians"		5:20
11.	"Trip the Light Fantastic"		4:33
12.	"The Weight of Dreams"		8:51
Total length:			63:33

Japanese edition bonus tracks
No.	Title	Length
13.	"Heat Above" (live version)	5:48
14.	"Stardust Chords" (live version)	5:22
Total length:		74:49

== Personnel ==
Greta Van Fleet

- Joshua Kiszka – lead and backing vocals
- Jacob Kiszka – guitar, backing vocals
- Samuel Kiszka – bass, keyboards, backing vocals
- Daniel Wagner – drums, backing vocals

Additional musicians

- Jacob Braun – cello (1, 3, 7, 8, 12)
- Alma Fernandez – viola (1, 3, 7, 8, 12)
- Charlie Bisharat – violin (1, 3, 7, 8, 12)
- Songa Lee – violin (1, 3, 7, 8, 12)

Technical

- Greg Kurstin – production, engineering
- Mark "Spike" Stent – mixing
- Julian Burg – engineering
- Alex Pasco – engineering
- Matt Wolach – mixing assistance
- Matt Tuggle – recording assistance (1–8, 11, 12)
- Peter Luretig – recording assistance (1–8, 11, 12)
- Brian Rajaratnam – recording assistance (1–8, 11, 12)

== Charts ==
=== Weekly charts ===
Weekly chart performance for The Battle at Garden's Gate
Chart (2021)	Peak position
Australian Albums (ARIA)	42
Austrian Albums (Ö3 Austria)	2
Belgian Albums (Ultratop Flanders)	13
Belgian Albums (Ultratop Wallonia)	1
Canadian Albums (Billboard)	11
Czech Albums (ČNS IFPI)	91
Dutch Albums (Album Top 100)	16
Finnish Albums (Suomen virallinen lista)	14
French Albums (SNEP)	29
German Albums (Offizielle Top 100)	3
Irish Albums (IRMA)	62
Italian Albums (FIMI)	6
Japanese Albums (Oricon)	39
Norwegian Albums (VG-lista)	30
Polish Albums (ZPAV)	8
Portuguese Albums (AFP)	15
Scottish Albums (Official Charts)	2
Spanish Albums (Promusicae)	19
Swedish Albums (Sverigetopplistan)	11
Swiss Albums (Schweizer Hitparade)	3
UK Albums (Official Charts)	8
UK Rock & Metal Albums (Official Charts)	2
US Billboard 200	7
US Top Hard Rock Albums (Billboard)	1
US Top Rock Albums (Billboard)	1

=== Year-end charts ===
Year-end chart performance for The Battle at Garden's Gate
Chart (2021)	Position
Belgian Albums (Ultratop Wallonia)	83
German Albums (Offizielle Top 100)	80
US Top Rock Albums (Billboard)	54
