= Highway Tune =

2017 single by Greta Van Fleet

Single by Greta Van Fleet

from the album Black Smoke Rising and From the Fires
- Released: March 31, 2017
- Recorded: 2015–16
- Genre: Hard rock; blues rock
- Length: 3:01
- Label: Lava; Republic
- Songwriters: Jacob Kiszka; Joshua Kiszka; Samuel Kiszka; Daniel Wagner

Greta Van Fleet singles chronology
| "Highway Tune" (2017) | "Safari Song" (2017) |

Music video
- "Highway Tune" on YouTube

"Highway Tune" is a song by American rock band Greta Van Fleet. It was their first single from their debut EP Black Smoke Rising. It topped the Billboard Mainstream Rock and Active Rock charts in September 2017. The song, and the rest of its respective EP, is also part of the band's double EP From the Fires, released on November 10, 2017.

== Background ==
"Highway Tune" was the first song Greta Van Fleet wrote and recorded together. The song's initial guitar riff was cited by guitarist Jake Kiszka as being written as early as 2010—seven years before the song's release as a single, and two years before the band was formed. The riff was brought to early writing and recording sessions when the band formed in 2012, and was later reformatted and demoed twice before being recorded in its final form. The song was initially used in an episode of the television show Shameless in January 2016. It was officially released as one of four songs on the band's debut EP, Black Smoke Rising. The song was released on March 31, 2017, as a single, and on the EP on April 21, 2017. The music video was released two days before the EP's release, and features the band playing in an abandoned warehouse.

== Themes and composition ==
The song has received many comparisons to the work of Led Zeppelin, including comparison to the vocals of Robert Plant.

== Reception ==
The song topped the Billboard Mainstream Rock and Active Rock stations in September 2017. The Mainstream Rock chart was topped in just 14 weeks. Billboard magazine noted that, outside of solo musicians breaking away from their original band, Greta Van Fleet with "Highway Tune" was the fastest for a band to top the Mainstream Rock charts with their debut single since Tantric's 2001 single "Breakdown" and 3 Doors Down's 2000 single "Kryptonite". Loudwire named it the second best hard rock song of 2017. HelloMusicTheory ranked the song as the 8th best rock song of the 2010s.

== Personnel ==
- Joshua Kiszka – vocals
- Jacob Kiszka – guitar
- Samuel Kiszka – bass guitar
- Daniel Wagner – drums, tambourine, shaker

== Charts ==
=== Weekly charts ===
| Chart (2017–2018) | Peak position |
|---|---|
| Argentina Airplay (Monitor Latino) | 6 |
| Canada Rock (Billboard) | 4 |
| Iceland (RÚV) | 10 |
| US Hot Rock & Alternative Songs (Billboard) | 21 |
| US Rock & Alternative Airplay (Billboard) | 12 |

=== Year-end charts ===
| Chart (2017) | Position |
|---|---|
| US Hot Rock Songs (Billboard) | 83 |
| US Rock Airplay (Billboard) | 48 |

== Certifications ==
| Region | Certification | Certified units/sales |
|---|---|---|
| Brazil (Pro-Música Brasil) | Gold | 30,000^{‡} |
| Canada (Music Canada) | 3× Platinum | 240,000^{‡} |
| New Zealand (RMNZ) | Platinum | 30,000^{‡} |
| United States (RIAA) | Platinum | 1,000,000^{‡} |
^{‡} Sales+streaming figures based on certification alone.
