= When the Curtain Falls =

Single by Greta Van Fleet

from the album Anthem of the Peaceful Army
- Released: July 17, 2018
- Recorded: 2018
- Studio: Blackbird Studios (Nashville, Tennessee)
- Genre: Hard rock; blues rock
- Length: 3:42
- Label: Lava; Republic
- Songwriters: Jake Kiszka; Josh Kiszka; Sam Kiszka; Danny Wagner
- Producers: Herschel Boone; Al Sutton; Marlon Young

Greta Van Fleet singles chronology
"Safari Song" (2017)	"When the Curtain Falls" (2018)	"You're the One" (2018)

Music video
- "When the Curtain Falls" on YouTube

"When the Curtain Falls" is a song by American rock band Greta Van Fleet. It was released as the first single from their debut album, Anthem of the Peaceful Army. In November 2018, it reached number one on the Billboard Mainstream Rock chart.

== Background ==
The song was first released on July 17, 2018, as the debut single off of their at the time unreleased and untitled upcoming studio album. The single was released ahead of the studio album to kick off their summer 2018 tour. The song's live debut on national television was on July 28, 2018, on The Tonight Show Starring Jimmy Fallon. A music video was released on August 15, 2018. The video alternates between clips of the band performing in the desert, and footage of glowing-eyed people observing things resembling solar eclipses and Aurora borealis.

The song was featured in the soundtracks of the video games NHL 19 and MLB The Show 19. It was also released as DLC for Rock Band 4.

== Composition and themes ==
Billboard described the song's sound as "hard-hitting drums, funky, distorted guitar solos and sky-high, impassioned vocals. Rolling Stone described the song as "swaggering" and "blistering" with a bluesy guitar and bass melody. Variety noted that the song, like much of the band's music, had a sound similar to Led Zeppelin. Lyrically, the song discusses a person's fall from grace, vocalist Josh Kizska singing "When the curtain falls/ Walk the hollow halls, babe/ Once a valley doll/ Now, you’re not at all."

== Reception ==
MetalSucks praised the song, comparing it favorably to the work of Led Zeppelin, concluding that "...it's pretty good! If you like Led Zep it's hard to imagine you won't like this, so crank it and enjoy. If you were never into Robert Plant's voice... well, you should probably just move along." Loudwire similarly praised it for its "rich classic rock warmth and sheen worthy of the genre's most accomplished artists". Multiple publications and news outlets praised the band's live performance of the song on The Tonight Show Starring Jimmy Fallon as well, noting that they also received a standing ovation from the crowd.

== Personnel ==
- Joshua Kiszka – vocals
- Jacob Kiszka – guitar
- Samuel Kiszka – bass, keyboards
- Daniel Wagner – drums, percussion

== Charts ==
=== Weekly charts ===
Weekly chart performance for "When the Curtain Falls"
Chart (2018–2019)	Peak position
Belgium (Ultratip Bubbling Under Flanders)	4
Belgium (Ultratip Bubbling Under Wallonia)	37
Bolivia (Monitor Latino)	18
US Hot Rock & Alternative Songs (Billboard)	9
US Rock & Alternative Airplay (Billboard)	10

=== Year-end charts ===
Year-end chart performance for "When the Curtain Falls"
Chart (2018)	Position
US Hot Rock Songs (Billboard)	34
US Rock Airplay (Billboard)	35

== Certifications ==
Certifications for "When the Curtain Falls"
Region	Certification	Certified units/sales
Brazil (Pro-Música Brasil)	Gold	20,000^{‡}
Canada (Music Canada)	Platinum	80,000^{‡}
United States (RIAA)	Gold	500,000^{‡}
^{‡} Sales+streaming figures based on certification alone.
