= Black Smoke Rising =

EP by Greta Van Fleet
- Released: April 21, 2017
- Recorded: 2016
- Studio: Rustbelt Studios, Royal Oak, Michigan
- Genre: Rock
- Length: 16:31
- Label: Republic
- Producer: Marlon Young; Al Sutton

Greta Van Fleet chronology
| Black Smoke Rising (2017) | From the Fires (2017) |

Singles from Black Smoke Rising
- 1. "Highway Tune" Released: March 31, 2017; 2. "Safari Song" Released: October 15, 2017

Black Smoke Rising is the debut EP by American rock band Greta Van Fleet. It was released digitally on April 21, 2017, and physically on August 7, 2017 by Republic Records. The single "Highway Tune" topped the Billboard Mainstream Rock and Active Rock Rock stations in September 2017. A second single, "Safari Song", reached number two. The EP was later packed together with four more songs to create From the Fires, an EP released on November 10, 2017.

== Background and release ==
The songs were recorded at Rustbelt Studios in Royal Oak, Michigan in just three days in 2016. Black Smoke Rising was planned to be the first of three EPs that would make an album when all released. Its cover art was designed by Josh and Jake.

The song "Highway Tune" was released as a single on March 31, 2017, and topped the Billboard Mainstream Rock and Active Rock Rock stations in September 2017. On April 18, 2017 the music video for the song "Highway Tune" was released exclusively on Loudwire.

On April 21, 2017 they were named Apple Music's new artist of the week. A second single, "Safari Song", was released in October 2017, and peaked at number 1 on the same chart in February 2018.

== Themes and composition ==
Opening track "Highway Tune" is the first song the band had ever written, dating back to their original drummer. "Safari Song" is almost as old. Sam revealed that it originally had a "big percussion break with like bongos and congas, very kind of Santana, kind of South American style" that got cut from the version included on the EP.

"Flower Power" was written around 2014, when Jake created the guitar riff. Sam explained "Jake just started playing two chords together and, you know, magic happened. I sat down on the organ and started playing the part and then Josh came out and sang the song all the way through, like it was already written." He also said he was imagining the end of "America" by Simon and Garfunkel for its organ outro. Josh said to him it gave a San Francisco Haight-Ashbury vibe and was written with a "folk influence and a nod to that era's sound."

The title track was written in the studio during the recording of the other three. Its lyrics are a "reflection on the lessons of history and that man does not always learn from the lessons of history" and "in a more positive light, embodies a unity of humanity."

== Reception ==
As of February 24, 2018, the EP has sold 70,000 units (including 47,000 in traditional album sales) in the U.S.

== Track listing ==
| No. | Title | Length |
|---|---|---|
| 1. | "Highway Tune" | 3:01 |
| 2. | "Safari Song" | 3:56 |
| 3. | "Flower Power" | 5:13 |
| 4. | "Black Smoke Rising" | 4:21 |
| Total length: | | 16:31 |

== Personnel ==
Greta Van Fleet

- Joshua Kiszka – vocals
- Jacob Kiszka – guitar, mandolin on "Flower Power"
- Samuel Kiszka – bass, organ on "Flower Power"
- Daniel Wagner – drums

Production

- Marlon Young – producer, mixer
- Al Sutton – producer, mixer
- Herschel Boone – vocal producer

== Charts ==
| Chart (2017) | Peak position |
|---|---|
| US Billboard 200 | 182 |
| US Top Hard Rock Albums (Billboard) | 10 |
| US Top Rock Albums (Billboard) | 30 |
