= Starcatcher (album) =

Studio album by Greta Van Fleet
- Released: July 21, 2023
- Recorded: 2021–2023
- Studios: RCA Studio A (Nashville, Tennessee); Low Country South (Savannah, Georgia)
- Genres: Hard rock; progressive rock; psychedelic rock
- Length: 42:47
- Labels: Lava; Republic
- Producer: Dave Cobb

Greta Van Fleet chronology
The Battle at Garden's Gate (2021)	Starcatcher (2023)	Palace for the People (2026)

Singles from Starcatcher
- 1. "Meeting the Master" Released: April 7, 2023; 2. "Sacred the Thread" Released: May 19, 2023; 3. "Farewell for Now" Released: June 9, 2023; 4. "The Falling Sky" Released: June 27, 2023

Starcatcher is the third studio album by American rock band Greta Van Fleet. It was released on July 21, 2023, through Lava and Republic Records.

The album debuted at number 8 on the US Billboard 200 selling 46,000 album-equivalent units in its first week.

== Background and recording ==
According to drummer Danny Wagner, "We had this idea that we wanted to tell these stories to build a universe. We wanted to introduce characters and motifs and these ideas that would come about here and there throughout our careers through this world."

During an interview in 2022, bassist Sam Kiszka stated that the album would go back to a more raw sound, being conceptually almost going back to their days in the garage. He also went on to say how the album will be an expansion of the band's sound. Furthermore, he stated how the band is "bringing our heads back to that garage time" and "making the album exciting and raw and energetic".

== Release and promotion ==
The album was first announced on social media following the final three shows of the Dreams in Gold Tour, in which the band played the new tracks "Meeting the Master", "The Falling Sky", "Indigo Streak", "Sacred the Thread", and "Farewell for Now". The track "Meeting the Master" was released on April 7, 2023, as the lead single from the album. The track "Sacred the Thread" was released on May 19, 2023 as the second single, and the track "Farewell for Now" was released June 9, 2023 as the third single. The track "The Falling Sky" was released on June 27, 2023 as the fourth single. The world tour in promotion of the album began in Nashville, Tennessee on July 24, 2023.

== Critical reception ==
Professional ratings
Aggregate scores
Source	Rating
Metacritic	61/100
Review scores
Source	Rating
AllMusic	2.5/5 stars
Kerrang!	4/5
Mojo	3/5 stars
Sputnikmusic	1.0/5
Uncut	5/10

Starcatcher received a score of 61 out of 100 on review aggregator Metacritic based on eight critics' reviews, indicating "generally favorable" reception. Both Mojo and Uncut compared select tracks on the album to Led Zeppelin's songs, with Mojo saying "Fate of the Faithful" sounds like "No Quarter" and "Meeting the Master" sounds like "Thank You", and Uncut pointing out the harmonica from "When the Levee Breaks" is imitated on "The Falling Sky", while its beat is used on "Sacred the Thread", but neither helps the songs "stick in the memory".

Rolling Stone's David Browne stated that while there are a "few new" elements to the album, it is "simply impossible to listen to Starcatcher and, as with all their previous work, not think you've stumbled upon a vault of outtakes from Led Zeppelin and some of their peers". A staff reviewer from Sputnikmusic dismissed the album as "a record so entrenched in referencing other music that it ceases to be artistic expression, and is entirely separated from expression as a concept, floating in its own sterility".

Stephen Thomas Erlewine of AllMusic wrote that the band are "stripping away the studio gloss so they can stand on their merits as a rock & roll band" and "the lack of polish on Starcatcher does make Greta Van Fleet seem leaner, but not meaner". Steve Beebee of Kerrang! described the album as "the work of a band not phased by success, but continuing to develop its art. With a nod to the classic rock that inspired them, Greta Van Fleet continue to contort those great influences in challenging and evocative new directions". Classic Rock stated that it "feels like their most consistent and complete record yet".

== Track listing ==
All tracks are written by Joshua Kiszka, Jacob Kiszka, Samuel Kiszka, Daniel Wagner, and Dave Cobb.

No.	Title	Length
1.	"Fate of the Faithful"	4:47
2.	"Waited All Your Life"	4:26
3.	"The Falling Sky"	3:38
4.	"Sacred the Thread"	5:21
5.	"Runway Blues"	1:17
6.	"The Indigo Streak"	4:04
7.	"Frozen Light"	4:33
8.	"The Archer"	5:00
9.	"Meeting the Master"	5:12
10.	"Farewell for Now"	4:29
Total length:		42:47

== Personnel ==
Credits are adapted from the album's liner notes and Tidal.

=== Greta Van Fleet ===
- Joshua Kiszka – vocals, background vocals, harmonica on "The Falling Sky"
- Jacob Kiszka – guitar, background vocals
- Samuel Kiszka – bass guitar, keyboards, background vocals
- Daniel Wagner – drums, background vocals

=== Technical ===
- Dave Cobb – production, mixing
- Greg Gordon – engineering, mixing
- Mark "Spike" Stent – mixing
- Matt Wolach – mixing assistance
- Phillip Smith – additional engineering
- Pete Lyman – mastering
- Andrew Brightman – production coordination
- Paige Sara – creative direction, art direction
- Nick Zimmerman – art direction
- Neil Krug – booklet and insert photography
- André Lergier – front cover photo
- Joshua Case – back cover photo

== Charts ==
Chart performance for Starcatcher
Chart (2023)	Peak position
Austrian Albums (Ö3 Austria)	6
Belgian Albums (Ultratop Flanders)	16
Belgian Albums (Ultratop Wallonia)	3
Canadian Albums (Billboard)	19
Dutch Albums (Album Top 100)	7
Finnish Albums (Suomen virallinen lista)	42
French Albums (SNEP)	23
German Albums (Offizielle Top 100)	2
Irish Albums (IRMA)	75
Italian Albums (FIMI)	18
Japanese Hot Albums (Billboard Japan)	60
Polish Albums (ZPAV)	11
Scottish Albums (Official Charts)	2
Spanish Albums (Promusicae)	40
Swedish Albums (Sverigetopplistan)	22
Swiss Albums (Schweizer Hitparade)	2
UK Albums (Official Charts)	8
UK Rock & Metal Albums (Official Charts)	2
US Billboard 200	8
