= MyTuner Radio =

Internet radio app

myTuner Radio
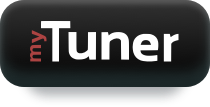
- Developer: AppGeneration
- Release: April 2012; 14 years ago
- Operating system: Android, iOS, Windows Phone, Microsoft Windows, OS X
- Available in: English, Arabic, French, German, Italian, Japanese, Korean, Portuguese, Russian, Spanish, Chinese, Turkish
- Type: Media players
- Website: mytuner-radio.com

myTuner Radio, or simply myTuner, is an Internet radio app directory/platform owned by AppGeneration – Software Technologies, Lda, a development company based in Porto, Portugal founded by Eduardo Carqueja in October 2010. myTuner Radio has over 50,000 radio stations and one million podcasts from all around the world (except in the UK where only UK stations are available). On June 7, 2017, AppGeneration announced that its service had over 30 million users and a database with radio stations of 200 countries. my Tuner Radio platform is available for the web at mytuner-radio.com, for a suite of mobile apps: iOS, Google Play, Samsung, Huawei, Amazon, Windows Phone; for desktop devices: Web, Windows, and Mac, wearables: Apple Watch and Android Wearables, for connected devices like Apple TV, Samsung TVs, LG TVs, TV sets and set-top boxes with Android TV (TCL, Sony, Sharp, Toshiba, Panasonic, Philips, Haier, Mi Box, etc.), Amazon Fire TV, Roku, Roku TV and Chromecast, connected cars: Apple Carplay, Android Auto, Bosch mySPIN, Jaguar & Land Rover InControl Apps, and also on home appliances and smart speakers like Alexa and Sonos.

== History ==
On April 27, 2012, myTuner Radio v1.0 was launched for iOS on the AppStore. This was the first version launched and the app was known as iTuner Radio app, owned by Digital Minds, a development company based in Coimbra, Portugal.

The Version 3 of the iOS app, brought a new and improved design and new features, such as the most popular podcasts in each country. It was launched on August 26, 2013.

During 2013, AppGeneration – Software Technologies, Lda acquired the software and started to change the brand's vision of a single app development to a multi-platform directory of Internet radio stations.

These changes were visible during 2014: in January it was launched for Android and in February it was rebranded as myTuner Radio and was launched to Mac OS X. During this year it was launched on several other platforms, including Windows Phone and Windows Desktop. The website mytuner-radio.com was also completely transformed from an institutional landing page, to a directory of streaming radio stations, where users can listen to radio stations, podcasts and music charts.

On April 23, 2015, during the launch of myTuner Radio for Apple Watch, AppGeneration announced that the platform reached 10 million users. myTuner Radio was available for the Apple Watch since the first day the Apple Watch companion app for the iPhone became available. myTuner Radio also announced the tvOS app for the Apple TV, on the exact day the 4th generation Apple TV was released to the public, on October 30, 2015.

Generally, myTuner Radio is available in two versions: a paid and a free version supported by ads. The free version for iOS (v.4.5), launched on April 16, 2016, featured for the first time in-app purchases to unlock ads. This version, named in the US AppStore as “myTuner Radio - Live Stations” was available for iOS 7.0 and above and was a universal app for iPhone and iPad. Plus, it also included an Apple TV version, as well as a companion Apple Watch App. In this version the app became available in 13 different languages: English, French, German, Spanish, Italian, Portuguese, Russian, Korean, Japanese, Simplified Chinese, Traditional Chinese, Turkish and Arabic.

On September 21, 2017 version 6 was released for both iOS and Android and it became available in 7 new languages: Danish, Dutch, Indonesian, Norwegian, Polish, Swedish and Thai. Currently, myTuner is available on a total of 20 different languages and is used by 30 million people from all over the globe.

In March 2018, it became available for Samsung & LG TVs, Android TV (TCL, Sony, Sharp, Toshiba, Panasonic, Philips, Haier), set-top boxes (Mi Box, etc.), Amazon Fire TV, Alexa and Sonos. On April, myTuner Radio added one more platform to the list and became available on Roku.

== Function ==
myTuner Radio's platform offers users the ability to listen to the streaming audio of more than 50,000 radio stations of 200 countries, including AM, FM, HD, LP, DAB and online/Internet stations. Additionally, it features one million podcasts and charts of the most played songs on the radio, per country, with a 30-second music preview from iTunes.

iGeeksBlog choose myTuner Radio as one of the 12 best Radio apps for iPhone and iPad of 2016 The Italian non-profit association for the consumers, Altroconsumo, elected myTuner as best purchase, in 2017. The Norwegian TV channel, TV2 nominated myTuner as “Best International Radio App” in 2017.

After upgrade to 7.8.3 on iPhone, previously available stations are no longer available in the UK, and an error message appears stating: "This station is not available in your location".

== Availability and supported devices ==
myTuner Radio is available worldwide on the web and also on dozens of platforms, including mobile and home entertainment. The following is a list of all the platforms that currently support myTuner Radio:

- Mobile
  - Apple iPhone, iPad, and iPod Touch (iOS 9.0 or later)
  - Google Play (Requires Android 4.1 or later)
  - Amazon App Store (Requires Android 4.1 or later)
  - Samsung Galaxy Apps (Requires Android 4.0 or later)
  - Huawei Store
  - Windows Phone
- Desktop
  - Mac App Store Application (Requires OS X 10.10 or later, 64 bit processor)
  - Windows 10
- Web
  - Safari
  - Firefox
  - Google Chrome
  - Opera
  - Internet Explorer
- Smart TVs
  - Apple TV
  - Samsung TV
  - LG TV
  - Android TV (TCL, Sony, Sharp, Toshiba, Panasonic, Philips, Haier, Mi Box, etc.)
  - Amazon Fire TV
  - Chromecast
  - Roku
  - Roku TV
- Home & Wearables
  - Amazon Alexa
  - Sonos
  - Apple Watch
  - Android Wear
- Connected Cars
  - Jaguar & Land Rover InControl Apps
  - Bosch mySPIN
  - Apple CarPlay
  - Android Auto
