= Detroit Music Awards =

Award show held in Michigan, US

- Current: Detroit Music Awards
- Detroit Music Awards 2020 logo
- Awarded for: Outstanding achievements in the music industry
- Country: United States
- Presented by: Detroit Music Awards Foundation
- First award: 1988
- Website: detroitmusicawards.net

The Detroit Music Awards Foundation is a Michigan 501(c)(3) organization, whose mission is to recognize Detroit area musicians working on national, regional, and local levels. The Foundation supports and nurtures the musical community in Detroit and the Detroit metropolitan area to create a network for musicians that cuts across genres and styles.

Initially proposed in 1988, and first presented by the Motor City Music Foundation, the multi-genre awards ceremony was established to bring recognition to Detroit area musicians. The first awards show was held at the Detroit Music Hall, and later moved to the State Theatre, now called The Fillmore Detroit. In 1998, the organization merged with the Metro Times-sponsored Detroit Music Awards to become one organization with one awards show for the Detroit Music community.

Since its inception, the Detroit Music Awards has recognized artists associated with the Detroit music scene, including: Alice Cooper, Anita Baker, Aretha Franklin, The Belleville Three, Big Sean, Bob Seger, CeCe Winans, The Clark Sisters, The Detroit Cobras, Diana Ross, Eminem, The Four Tops, George Clinton, Glenn Frey, The Gories, Grand Funk Railroad, Greta Van Fleet, Iggy Pop, Insane Clown Posse, Jack White, J Dilla, Kid Rock, Laith Al-Saadi, Luis Resto, Madonna, Martha Reeves and the Vandellas, Marvin Gaye, MC5, Mike Posner, The Miracles, Mitch Ryder, Parliament-Funkadelic, Protomartyr, The Raconteurs, The Romantics, Royce da 5'9", Sixto Rodriguez, Smokey Robinson, The Spinners, Sponge, Stevie Wonder, The Stooges, The Supremes, Suzi Quatro, Taproot, Ted Nugent, The Temptations, Thornetta Davis, Uncle Kracker, The Verve Pipe, Vienna Teng, The Von Bondies, Was (Not Was), and The White Stripes.

== Categories ==
Award winners are selected by music industry professionals, with award categories covering the following genres:

- Americana/Folk/Acoustic
- Blues
- Jazz
- Gospel
- Country
- Classical
- Rock/Pop
- R&B/Hip-Hop
- Electronic
- World

== General ==
=== Outstanding Anthology/Compilation/Reissue ===
==== Winners and nominees ====
Winners are listed first and highlighted in bold.

Year	Artist	Ref
2004
2004	**Bob Seger**	
2005
2005	**The Best of the Funk Brothers** by **The Funk Brothers**	
2006
2006	**Curtain Call: The Hits** by **Eminem**	
2007
2007	**20th Century Masters - Millennium Collection: The Best of Iggy Pop** by **Iggy Pop**	
2008
2008	**Here, My Dear** by **Marvin Gaye** (**Motown**/**UM^{e}**)	
2009
2009	**Motown: The Complete Number 1's** by **Motown**/**Universal**	
2010
2010	**Early Seger, Volume 1** by **Bob Seger** (**Hideout Records**)	
2011
2011	**The Best of Aretha Franklin: Quadrophonic Mix** by **Aretha Franklin** (**Rhino Handmade**)	
2012
2012	**Live Bullet** by **Bob Seger** (**Capitol Records**)	
2013
2013	**Searching for Sugar Man: Original Motion Picture Soundtrack** by **Rodriguez** (**Light in the Attic**/**Legacy**)	
2014
2014	**50th Anniversary: Singles Collection 1962-1972** by **Four Tops** (**Motown**/**UM^{e}**)	
2015
2015	**Revolutionary Action** by **Scott Morgan** (**Easy Action**)	
2016
2016	**Live at the Gold Dollar Vol. III** by **The White Stripes** (**Third Man Records**)	
2017
2017	**Acoustic Recordings 1998–2016** by **Jack White**	
2017	Live at the Gold Dollar 9-16-99 by Jack White and the Bricks	
2017	Life, Love and Leaving by The Detroit Cobras	
2017	Live at the Gold Dollar 11-25-98 by The Go	
2017	Live From the Gold Dollar Vol. III by The White Stripes	
2017	The Peel Sessions by The White Stripes	
2017	The Green Book by Twiztid	
2017	Live at the Gold Dollar 1-16-98 by Two-Star Tabernacle	
2018
2018	**Kick Out the Jams** by **MC5**	
2018	Live With the Royal Philharmonic Orchestra by Aretha Franklin	
2018	2 + 2 = ? by Bob Seger	
2018	Hot Coffey in the D: Burnin' at Morey Baker's Showplace Lounge by Dennis Coffey	
2018	Saturday Night Special by Lyman Woodard Organization	
2018	The Stooges by The Stooges	
2019
2019	**Atlantic Singles Collection 1967/70** by **Aretha Franklin**	
2019	Heavy Music: The Complete Cameo Recordings 1966-67 by Bob Seger & the Last Heard	
2019	One Night at Morey's 1968 by Dennis Coffey	
2019	Early Recordings: Detroit & Beyond Vol. 1 & Vol 2 by John Lee Hooker	
2019	Out of the Closet by Trash Brats	
2019	Motor City Gems by WHFR	
2020
2020	**Live at Baker's 2006** by **Dennis Coffey**	
2020	Strawberry Cheesecake EP by Algebra Mothers	
2020	Amazing Grace: The Complete Recordings by Aretha Franklin	
2020	You're the Man by Marvin Gaye	
2020	Motown: The Complete No. 1's	
2020	XX by The White Stripes	

=== Outstanding Live Performance ===
==== Winners and nominees ====
Winners are listed first and highlighted in bold.

Year	Artist	Ref
2004
2004	**Detroit Women In R&B**	
2005
2005	**Detroit Women**	
2006
2006	**Detroit Women** with **Motor City Express**	
2007
2007	**Brothers Groove**	
2008
2008	**The Hard Lessons**	
2009	**The Hard Lessons**	
2010
2010	**Hot Club of Detroit**	
2011
2011	**Howling Diablos**	
2012
2012	**Satori Circus**	
2013
2013	**The Ruiners**	
2014
2014	**The Infatuations**	
2015
2015	**Howling Diablos**	
2016
2016	**The Infatuations**	
2017
2017	**Thornetta Davis**	
2017	Chrissii Key	
2017	Corktown Popes	
2017	Elsie Binx	
2017	Jagged Edge	
2017	Rio and the Rockabilly Revival	
2017	The Seatbelts	
2017	Warhorses	
2018
2018	**Jill Jack Band**	
2018	Artificial Agent	
2018	Chrissii Key	
2018	RTG Righteous Through God	
2018	The Luddites	
2018	The Ruiners	
2018	Warhorses	
2019
2019	**Thornetta Davis**	
2019	Chrissii Key	
2019	Gasoline Gypsies	
2019	Kris Kurzawa Group	
2019	Laith Al-Saadi	
2019	Motor City Horns	
2019	Theatre Bizarre Orchestra	
2019	Warhorses	
2020
2020	**Motor City Josh & The Big 3**	
2020	Buggs Beddow & The Good Stuff	
2020	Chrissii Key	
2020	Corktown Popes	
2020	Jill Jack	
2020	Sean Blackman's In Transit	
2020	Warhorses	

=== Outstanding Live Sound Technician ===
==== Winners and nominees ====
Winners are listed first and highlighted in bold.

Year	Artist	Ref
2004
2004	**Neil T Sever**	
2005
2005	**Neil T Sever**	
2006	**Neil T Sever**	
2007
2007	**Donnie Davenport**	
2008
2008	**Neil T Sever**	
2009	**Neil T Sever**	
2010	**Neil T Sever**	
2011
2011	**Peter Jay**	
2012
2012	**Neil T Sever**	
2013
2013	**Peter Jay**	
2014	**Peter Jay**	
2015
2015	**Neil T Sever**	
2016
2016	**Tom Lubinski**	
2017
2017	**Peter Jay**	
2017	Adam Busuttil	
2017	Bill Kozy	
2017	Bryan Reilly	
2017	C. B. "Craiger" Sias	
2017	Kevin Sharpe	
2017	Neil T Sever	
2017	Peter Jay	
2018
2018	**Neil T Sever**	
2018	Adam Busuttil	
2018	Bill Kozy	
2018	C. B. "Craiger" Sias	
2018	Dave Miseveth	
2018	Peter Jay	
2019
2019	**Neil T Sever**	
2019	Bill Kozy	
2019	Chris Panackia	
2019	Mikey Woo	
2019	Peter Jay	
2019	Rob Muccino	
2020
2020	**Kelly Tucker**	
2020	Adam Busuttil	
2020	Bill Kozy	
2020	Glenn Preston	
2020	Mike Carr	
2020	Peter Jay	

=== Outstanding Local Record Label ===
==== Winners and nominees ====
Winners are listed first and highlighted in bold.

Year	Artist	Ref
2005
2005	**Time Beach Records**	
2006
2006	**Mack Avenue Records**	
2007	**Mack Avenue Records**	
2008	**Mack Avenue Records**	
2009
2009	**No Cover Productions**	
2010
2010	**Mack Avenue Records**	
2011	**Mack Avenue Records**	
2012	**Mack Avenue Records**	
2013
2013	**Funky D Records**	
2014	**Funky D Records**	
2015
2015	**Detroit Music Factory**	
2016
2016	**Detroit Music Factory**	
2017
2017	**Funky D Records**	
2017	Detroit Techno Militia	
2017	Drum Dancer	
2017	Got The Key Records	
2017	Jett Plastic Recordings	
2017	M1 Records	
2017	No Cover Productions	
2017	Smokin' Sled Dog Records	
2018
2018	**Detroit Music Factory**	
2018	Detroit Techno Records	
2018	Funky D Records	
2018	Got The Key Records	
2018	Jett Plastic Recordings	
2018	Smokin Sleddog Records	
2019
2019	**Funky D Records**	
2019	Detroit Techno	
2019	Got The Key Records	
2019	Jett Plastic Recordings	
2019	Middle Finger Music	
2019	Planet E	
2020
2020	**Detroit Music Factory**	
2020	Detroit Techno	
2020	Funky D Records	
2020	Got The Key Records	
2020	Jett Plastic Recordings	
2020	Reel II Real	

=== Outstanding National Major Record Label Recording ===
==== Winners and nominees ====
Winners are listed first and highlighted in bold.

Year	Artist	Ref
2004		
2004	**The White Stripes**	
2005
2005	**Encore** by **Eminem**	
2006
2006	**A Time to Love** by **Stevie Wonder**	
2007
2007	**Face the Promise** by **Bob Seger**	
2008
2008	**Rock n Roll Jesus** by **Kid Rock** (**Top Dog**/**Atlantic**)	
2009
2009	**Consolers of the Lonely** by **The Raconteurs**	
2010
2010	**Preliminaries** by **Iggy Pop** (**Astrel Works**/**Virgin**)	
2011
2011	**Recovery** by **Eminem** (**Shady**/**Aftermath**/**Interscope**)	
2012
2012	**Hell: The Sequel** by **Bad Meets Evil** (**Shady**/**Interscope**)	
2013
2013	**Blunderbuss** by **Jack White** (**Third Man**/**XL**)	
2014
2014	**The Marshall Mathers LP 2** by **Eminem** (**Shady**/**Aftermath**/**Interscope**)	
2015
2015	**Ride Out** by **Bob Seger** (**Capitol**)	
2016
2016	**First Kiss** by **Kid Rock** (**Warner Bros.**)	
2017
2017	**Post Pop Depression** by **Iggy Pop**	
2017	Twenty88 by Big Sean and Jhené Aiko	
2017	La Petite Mort or a Conversation with God by King 810	
2017	Man About Town by Mayer Hawthorne	
2017	At Night, Alone by Mike Posner	
2018
2018	**From the Fires** by **Greta Van Fleet** (**Republic**)	
2018	Paranormal by Alice Cooper (earMUSIC)	
2018	I Knew You When by Bob Seger (Capitol)	
2018	Let Them Fall in Love by CeCe Winans (PureSprings EMI Gospel)	
2018	Revival by Eminem (Shady/Aftermath/Interscope/Goliath)	
2018	Sweet Southern Sugar by Kid Rock (BBR Music Group)	
2019
2019	**Anthem of the Peaceful Army** by **Greta Van Fleet**	
2019	Music Is Life by David McMurray	
2019	Kamikaze by Eminem	
2019	Boarding House Reach by Jack White	
2019	I Was Born In Detroit by Mike Posner	
2019	All the Time by The Temptations	
2020
2020	**Breadcrumbs** by **Alice Cooper**	
2020	Stacked by Kash Doll	
2020	Madame X by Madonna	
2020	A Real Good Kid by Mike Posner	
2020	Keep Going by Mike Posner	
2020	From Michigan, With Love by Quinn XCII	

=== Outstanding National Single ===
==== Winners and nominees ====
Winners are listed first and highlighted in bold.

Year	Artist	Ref
2004
2004	**The White Stripes**	
2005
2005	"**You're My Everything**" by **Anita Baker**	
2006
2006	"**Blue Orchid**" by **The White Stripes**	
2007
2007	"**Wait for Me**" by **Bob Seger**	
2008
2008	"**Icky Thump**" by **The White Stripes**	
2009
2009	"**All Summer Long**" by **Kid Rock**	
2010
2010	"**Smile**" by **Uncle Kracker**	
2011
2011	"**Not Afraid**" by **Eminem**	
2012
2012	"**The Walk**" by **Mayer Hawthorne**	
2013
2013	"**I'm Shakin'**" by **Jack White**	
2014
2014	"**Come in From the Rain**" by **Sponge**	
2015
2015	"**Detroit Made**" by **Bob Seger**	
2016
2016	"**That Black Bat Licorice**" by **Jack White**	
2017
2017	"**The Letter**" by **Laith Al-Saadi**	
2017	"Bounce Back" by Big Sean	
2017	"Go (Let Me Save You)" by Citizen Zero	
2017	"Campaign Speech" by Eminem	
2017	"Gardenia" by Iggy Pop	
2017	"You Are the Sunshine of My Life" by Jack White	
2017	"Love Like That" by Mayer Hawthorne	
2017	"Tabernackle" by Royce da 5'9"	
2017	"City Lights"/"Love Is the Truth" by The White Stripes/Jack White	
2018
2018	"**Highway Tune**" by **Greta Van Fleet**	
2018	"Paranoiac Personality" by Alice Cooper	
2018	"Busload of Faith" by Bob Seger	
2018	"Never Have to Be Alone" by CeCe Winans	
2018	"Walk on Water" by Eminem	
2018	"Asshole Blues" by Iggy Pop	
2019
2019	"**When the Curtain Falls**" by **Greta Van Fleet**	
2019	"Finding Out" by Bob Seger	
2019	"Get Your Shirt" by Iggy Pop & the Underworld	
2019	"Connected by Love" by Jack White	
2019	"American Rock 'n' Roll" by Kid Rock	
2019	"Earned It" by The Temptations	
2020
2020	"**Lover, Leaver**" by **Greta Van Fleet**	
2020	"Freedom Ain't Freel" by Dave McMurray	
2020	"Pawn Shop Blues" by Eliza Neals	
2020	"Living With Ghosts" by John 5	
2020	"Carrie Got Married" by Mike Skill	
2020	"Help Me Stranger" by The Raconteurs	

=== Outstanding National Small/Independent Record Label Recording ===
==== Winners and nominees ====
Winners are listed first and highlighted in bold.

Year	Artist	Ref
2004
2004	**The Romantics**	
2005
2005	**Seldom Blues** by **Alexander Zonjic**	
2006
2006	**Car Wash** by **Howling Diablos**	
2007
2007	**Hot Club of Detroit** by **Hot Club of Detroit**	
2008
2008	**Spill At Will** by **Paradime** (**Beats At Will**)	
2009
2009	**George Clinton & his Gangsters of Love** by **George Clinton** (**Shanachie**)	
2010
2010	**The Gentleman Is Back** by **Johnnie Bassett** (**Mack Avenue**)	
2011
2011	**It's About That Time** by **Hot Club of Detroit** (**Mack Avenue**)	
2012
2012	**Dennis Coffey** by **Dennis Coffey** (**Strut**)	
2013
2013	**I Can Make it Happen** by **Johnnie Bassett** (**Sly Dog**)	
2014
2014	**Ready to Die** by **Iggy Pop & The Stooges** (**Fat Possum**)	
2015
2015	**Secret Evil** by **Jessica Hernandez & the Deltas**	
2016
2016	**Grab the Next Train EP** by **Marshall Crenshaw** (**Red River Entertainment**)	
2017
2017	**Acoustic In Idaho** by **Jack White**	
2017	Wanna Go Back to Detroit City by Andre Williams	
2017	State of Mind by Citizen Zero	
2017	Atrocity Exhibition by Danny Brown	
2017	Fresh Blood for Tired Vampires by Electric Six	
2017	The Diary by J Dilla	
2017	Pretending 2 Run by Tiles	
2017	Chariot by Victoria Reed	
2018
2018	**Sonic Ranch** by **Whitey Morgan and the 78's**	
2018	The Lucky Ones Forget by Craig Brown Band	
2018	Captives of the Wine Dark Sea by Discipline	
2018	Broke Royalty by Flint Eastwood	
2018	Enter the Kingdom by Frontier Ruckus	
2018	Cold Like War by We Came as Romans	
2019
2019	**Things Have Changed** by **Bettye LaVette**	
2019	Something's Happening! A Christmas Album by CeCe Winans	
2019	The Handbook (This Is a Coping Mechanism for a Broken Heart) by Flint Eastwood	
2019	On the Edge by Frijid Pink	
2019	Dub Encounters by Iggy Pop with Underworld Teatime	
2019	It's Alive by John 5	
2020
2020	**Free** by **Iggy Pop**	
2020	What More by The Detroit Cobras	
2020	Stay Down/Lightning Bird by The Detroit Cobras/Kenny Tudrick	
2020	Pawn Shop Blues by Eliza Neals	
2020	Detroit Breakout by Mitch Ryder	
2020	No Control by Suzi Quatro	

=== Outstanding Record Producer ===
==== Winners and nominees ====
Winners are listed first and highlighted in bold.

Year	Artist	Ref
2004
2004	**Brian "Roscoe" White**	
2005
2005	**Martin "Tino" Gross**	
2006	**Martin "Tino" Gross**	
2007
2007	**Martin "Tino" Gross**	
2008
2008	**Nolan Mendenhall**	
2009
2009	**Al Sutton**	
2010	**Al Sutton**	
2011
2011	**Martin "Tino" Gross**	
2012	**Martin "Tino" Gross**	
2013	**Martin "Tino" Gross**	
2014
2014	**Al Sutton**	
2015
2015	**Martin "Tino" Gross**	
2016
2016	**Martin "Tino" Gross**	
2017
2017	**Thornetta Davis**	
2017	Al Sutton	
2017	Andy Patalan	
2017	Bryan Reilly	
2017	Chuck Alkazian	
2017	Dave Feeny	
2017	"Motor City Josh" Ford	
2017	Tony Hamera	
2018
2018	**"Motor City Josh" Ford**	
2018	Al Sutton	
2018	Chuck Alkazian	
2018	Kevin Sharpe	
2018	Martin "Tino" Gross	
2018	Tony Hamera	
2019
2019	**Tony "T-Money" Green**	
2019	Al Sutton	
2019	Chuck Alkazian	
2019	Dave Feeny	
2019	"Motor City Josh" Ford	
2019	Martin "Tino" Gross	
2020
2020	**Chuck Alkazian**	
2020	Brian "Roscoe" White	
2020	Bryan Reilly	
2020	"Motor City Josh" Ford	
2020	Martin "Tino" Gross	
2020	Tony "T-Money" Green	

=== Outstanding Recording Studio ===
==== Winners and nominees ====
Winners are listed first and highlighted in bold.

Year	Artist	Ref
2004
2004	**Roscoe's Recording**	
2005
2005	**The Tempermill Studios**	
2006
2006	**Studio A**	
2007
2007	**Studio A** and **The Tempermill Studios**	
2008
2008	**Studio A**	
2009
2009	**The Tempermill Studios**	
2010
2010	**Rustbelt Studios**	
2011
2011	**Harmonie Park**	
2012	**Harmonie Park**	
2013
2013	**The Tempermill Studios**	
2014
2014	**Rustbelt Studios**	
2015
2015	**Pearl Sound Studios**	
2016
2016	**Pearl Sound Studios**	
2017
2017	**The Tempermill Studios**	
2017	Big Sky Recording	
2017	Funky D Studios	
2017	Metro 37 Recording	
2017	Roscoe's Recording	
2017	Rust Belt Recording Studio	
2017	Sound Shop Studio	
2017	The Loft	
2018
2018	**The Tempermill Studios**	
2018	Funky D Studios	
2018	Metro 37 Studios	
2018	Pearl Sound Studios	
2018	Rustbelt Studios	
2018	The Sound Shop	
2019
2019	**Rustbelt Studios**	
2019	Funky D Studios	
2019	Pearl Sound Studios	
2019	Sound Shop Studio	
2019	The Disc	
2019	The Loft	
2020
2020	**The Tempermill Studios**	
2020	Big Sky Recording	
2020	Pearl Sound Studios	
2020	Rustbelt	
2020	Sound Shop Studio	
2020	The Loft	

=== Outstanding Video (Limited Budget) ===
==== Winners and nominees ====
Winners are listed first and highlighted in bold.

Year	Artist	Ref
2005
2005	"**Around Your Love**" by **Nicole Jeffers**	
2006
2006	"**Rattle Your Cage**" by **Detroit Women** and **Motor City Express**	
2007
2007	"**Swing One**" by **Hot Club of Detroit**	
2010
2010	"**Motown Still Our Town**" by **Paul Miles**	
2011
2011	"**Slow Curve**" by **The Muggs**	
2012
2012	"**Mr. Right Now**" by **Howling Diablos**	
2013
2013	"**Eat Your Heart Out**" by **The Ruiners**	
2014
2014	"**Yesterday Morning**" by **The Infatuations**	
2015
2015	"**What You've Given**" by **Ben Sharkey**	
2016
2016	"**Funk Hand**" by **Howling Diablos** (dir. **Tony D'Annunzio**)	
2017
2017	"**Sister Friend Indeed**" by **Thornetta Davis**	
2017	"Detroit Guy" by Bugs Beddow & The Good Stuff	
2017	"Vermin Mentality" by Child Bite	
2017	"360" by Chrissii Key	
2017	"Hey There Miss" by Eric Smith	
2017	"Trouble In Paradise" by Kaleido	
2017	"6 to Midnite" by The Muggs	
2017	"Weightless" by Tiles	
2017	"Flint Talkin Blues" by Tino G	
2017	"Cold In Detroit" by Tosha Owens	
2018
2018	"**I Believe (Everything Gonna Be Alright)**" by **Thornetta Davis**	
2018	"Devil in the White Dress" by Artificial Agent	
2018	"Friendship Never Dies" by Danny D and the Vagabonds	
2018	"Say You Will" by Elsie Binx	
2018	"Queen" by Flint Eastwood	
2018	"Detroit Strong" by Tosha Owens	
2019
2019	"**Freaks & Nonbelievers**" by **Gasoline Gypsies**	
2019	"Roll This Way" by Ali McManus	
2019	"Summer Song" by Bob & April	
2019	"Selfie" by Chit	
2019	"Monster" by Flint Eastwood	
2019	"The Man Who Built Your Hot Rod" by Horse Cave Trio	
2020
2020	"**One Nation: Detroit's Tribute to the Funk**" by **Detroit Academy of Arts & Sciences Choir**	
2020	"Out of My Control" by Chrissii Key	
2020	"Why" by Julianne Ankley	
2020	"Limbo" by Steffanie Christi'an	
2020	"This Part of Town" by The Beggars	
2020	"I Had Problems Last Week" by Tino G's Dumpster Machine	

=== Outstanding Video (Major Budget) ===
==== Winners and nominees ====
Winners are listed first and highlighted in bold.

Year	Artist	Ref
2005
2005	"**Black Math**" by **The White Stripes**	
2006
2006	"**When I'm Gone**" by **Eminem**	
2007
2007	"**Wait for Me**" by **Bob Seger**	
2010
2010	"**Kissing My Love**" by **The Motor City Horns** and **The Brothers Groove** featuring **Thornetta Davis**	
2011
2011	"**Not Afraid**" by **Eminem**	
2012
2012	"**Care**" by **Kid Rock**	
2013
2013	"**We Almost Lost Detroit**" by **Dale Earnhardt Jr. Jr.**	
2014
2014	"**Berzerk**" by **Eminem**	
2015
2015	"**Detroit Made**" by **Bob Seger**	
2016
2016	"**California Stars**" by **Bob Seger**	
2017
2017	"**Gardenia**" by **Iggy Pop**	
2017	"No More Interviews" by Big Sean	
2017	"Go (Let Me Save You)" by Citizen Zero	
2017	"You Are the Sunshine of My Life" by Jack White	
2017	"Love Like That" by Mayer Hawthorne	
2017	"I Took a Pill in Ibiza" by Mike Posner	
2017	"Tabernackle" by Royce da 5'9"	
2017	"City Lights" by The White Stripes	
2018
2018	"**Highway Song**" by **Greta Van Fleet**	
2018	"The Sound of A" by Alice Cooper	
2018	"Bounce Back" by Big Sean	
2018	"Walk on Water" by Eminem	
2018	"Die Tryin" by Kaleido	
2018	"The Greatest Show on Earth" by Kid Rock	
2019
2019	"**When the Curtain Falls**" by **Greta Van Fleet**	
2019	"Fall" by Eminem	
2019	"Connected By Love" by Jack White	
2019	"Corporation" by Jack White	
2019	"Over and Over and Over" by Jack White	
2019	"Dumptruck" by Wilson	
2020
2020	"**Help Me Stranger**" by **The Raconteurs**	
2020	"Freedom Ain't Free" by Dave McMurray	
2020	"The Best Thing" by JoAnne Shaw Taylor	
2020	"Crank It/Living With Ghosts" by John 5	
2020	"Black Savage" by Royce da 5'9"	
2020	"Cocaine" by Royce da 5'9"	

=== Outstanding Tribute Band ===
==== Winners and nominees ====
Winners are listed first and highlighted in bold.

Year	Artist	Ref
2012
2012	**Danny D & the Vagabonds** (Rod Stewart tribute)	
2013
2013	**Fifty Amp Fuse: Your Generation**	
2014
2014	**Fifty Amp Fuse: Your Generation**	
2015
2015	**Whoremones (All Girl Ramones)**	
2016
2016	**Fifty Amp Fuse**	
2017
2017	**Bobby Murray Presents "The Music of Etta James"**	
2017	Air Margaritaville	
2017	Danny D and the Vagabonds	
2017	In the Flesh	
2017	Live Bullet Detroit	
2017	Magic Bus	
2017	Mega 80's	
2017	Motor City All Stars	
2017	The Whoremones	
2018
2018	**Magic Bus**	
2018	Bon Johnsons	
2018	Crazy Babies	
2018	Major Dudes	
2018	Rattlesnake Shake: A Peter Green/Fleetwood Mac Tribute	
2018	Wreking Crue	
2019
2019	**Major Dudes - A Steely Dan Tribute**	
2019	Crazy Babies	
2019	Danny D & the Vagabonds	
2019	Magic Bus	
2019	Rockstar 80's Band	
2019	Wreking Crue - The Mötley Crüe Experience	
2020
2020	**Major Dudes - A Steely Dan Tribute**	
2020	Crazy Babies	
2020	Dr. Pocket	
2020	Rockstar	
2020	The Santana Project	
2020	Wreking Crue	

== Outstanding Family Music Artist/Group ==
=== Winners and nominees ===
Winners are listed first and highlighted in bold.

Year	Artist	Ref
2017
2017	**The Verve Pipe**	
2017	Candy Bandits	
2017	Cast Iron Cornbread	
2017	Finvarra's Wren	
2017	Gemini	
2017	Groove Council	
2017	Metro Detroit Jazz Voices	
2017	The Farleys	

== Outstanding Family/Children's Music ==
=== Winners and nominees ===
Winners are listed first and highlighted in bold.

Year	Artist	Ref
2018
2018	**Chrissy Morgan** and **Sandy Mulligan**	
2018	Candy Bandits	
2018	Gemini	
2018	Mr. Bob's Rubber Band	
2018	Stuart Benbow	
2018	The Farleys	
2019
2019	**Miss Paula** and the **Candy Bandits**	
2019	Bob & Coltrane	
2019	Cast Iron Cornbread	
2019	Gro-Town	
2020
2020	**Miss Paula** and the **Candy Bandits**	
2020	Bob & Coltrane	
2020	Gemini	
2020	Gro-Town	
2020	Mr. Bob's Rubber Band	

People's Choice Award	2010	2011	2012	2013	2014	2015	2016	2017	2018	2019
Artist/Group	Nuandré	The Infatuations	The Infatuations	Mike Leslie Band	Steve Scott Country					
Sponsor	VitaminWater	VitaminWater	VitaminWater	VitaminWater	Opportunity Detroit					

== Americana ==
=== Outstanding Americana/Acoustic/Folk/Group ===
==== Winners and nominees ====
Winners are listed first and highlighted in bold.

Year	Artist	Ref
2004	**Tangerine Trousers**	
2005	**Grievous Angel**	
2006	**Jill Jack**	
2007
2007	**Jill Jack**	
2008
2008	**Jill Jack**	
2009
2009	**Ty Stone** (Acoustic)	
2009	**Billy Brandt** (Folk)	
2010
2010	**Jill Jack** (Acoustic)	
2010	**Billy Brandt & Sarana VerLin** (Folk)	
2011
2011	**Jill Jack** (Acoustic)	
2011	**Carolyn Striho** (Folk)	
2012
2012	**Doop and the Inside Outlaws** (Acoustic)	
2012	**Jill Jack** (Folk)	
2013
2013	**Billy Brandt** (Acoustic)	
2013	**Jill Jack** (Folk)	
2014
2014	**Emily Rose** (Acoustic)	
2014	**Jill Jack** (Folk)	
2015
2015	**Rio and the Rockabilly Revival**	
2016
2016	**Rio and the Rockabilly Revival**	
2017
2017	**Jill Jack**	
2018	**The Gasoline Gypsies**	
2019	**Jill Jack**	
2019	Acoustic Madness	
2019	Billy Brandt & The Sugarees	
2019	Ali McManus	
2019	Rio & The Rockabilly Revival	
2019	Thunderwude	
2020	**Billy Brandt & The Sugarees**	
2020	Acoustic Madness	
2020	Jill Jack	
2020	The Keynote Sisters	
2020	Audra Kubat	
2020	Carmel Liburdi	

=== Outstanding Americana/Acoustic/Folk Instrumentalist ===
==== Winners and nominees ====
Winners are listed first and highlighted in bold.

Year	Artist	Ref
2004	**Jeremy Kittel** (fiddle)	
2005	**David Mosher** (mandolin/guitar)	
2006	**Billy Brandt** (guitar)	
2007
2007	**Paul Miles** (Guitar)	
2008
2008	**Billy Brandt** (Guitar)	
2009
2009	**Sarana VerLin** (Violin)	
2010
2010	**Carolyn Striho** (Piano / Guitar)	
2011
2011	**Sarana VerLin** (Violin)	
2012
2012	**Billy Brandt** (Guitar/ Mandolin)	
2013
2013	**Billy Brandt** (Guitar / Mandolin)	
2014
2014	**Scott Dailey** (Guitar)	
2015
2015	**Audra Kubat** (Guitar)	
2016
2016	**Dave Feeny** (Pedal steel/guitar) (American Mars and David Bierman Overdrive)	
2017
2017	**Brett Lucas**	
2018	**Brett Lucas** (Guitar)	
2019	**Billy Brandt** (Multi)	
2019	Dave Falk (Dobro)	
2019	Bob Monteleone (Guitar)	
2019	Pete Peltier (Guitar)	
2019	Devin Scillian (Guitar)	
2019	Ron Wolf (Percussion)	
2020	**Chris Codish** (Multi)	
2020	Billy Brandt (Multi)	
2020	Dave Falk (Dobro)	
2020	Erik Gustafson (Guitar)	
2020	Mary McGuire (Guitar)	
2020	Bob Monteleone (Guitar)	
2020	Pete Peltier (Guitar)	

Acoustic/Folk	2004	2005	2006	2009	2010	2011	2014	2015	2016	2017	2018	2019	
Outstanding Americana/Acoustic/Folk Recording	Tangerine Trousers	Jill Jack Jill Jack Live And Unplugged	Jill Jack Moon And The Morning After	Luke Sayers & the Last to Know Radio Flower	Jill Jack Songwriter Sessions	Sarana VerLin Bats & Butterflies	Carolyn Striho Word Attack	Billy Brandt & the Sugarees The Time is Now	Rio and the Rockabilly Revival Testify	TIE - Billy Brandt & The Sugarees Moon Over My Head and Escaping Pavement The Night Owl	Emily Rose Wake Up Brave		
Outstanding Americana/Acoustic/Folk Songwriter	Liz Larin	Stacia Petrie	Jill Jack	Emily Rose	Emily Rose	Jill Jack	Jill Jack	Jill Jack	Mary McGuire	Emily Rose	.	Billy Brandt	
Outstanding AAmericana/Acoustic/Folk Vocalist	Liz Larin	Stacia Petrie	Jill Jack	Billy Brandt	Jill Jack	Jill Jack	Tosha Owens	Gia Warner	Gia Warner	Jill Jack	.	Jill Jack	
Outstanding Americana/Acoustic/Folk Group	Grievous Angel	Jeremy Kittel	Jeremy Kittel	Billy Brandt	Billy Brandt & Sarana VerLin	Carolyn Striho	Jill Jack	Rio and the Rockabilly Revival	Rio and the Rockabilly Revival	Jill Jack	Gasoline Gypsies	.	Jill Jack

== Blues ==
Blues R&B	2004	2005	2006	2009	2010	2011	2012	2013	2014	2015	2016	2017	2018	2019
Outstanding Blues Artist/Group	Thornetta Davis	Al Hill and The Love Butlers	Thornetta Davis	Jim McCarty & Mystery Train	Johnnie Bassett	Johnnie Bassett & the Blues Insurgents			Bobby Murray	Bobby Murray				
Outstanding Blues/R&B Instrumentalist	Brett Lucas guitar - Thornetta Davis	Dennis Burr guitar - Detroit Women	Johnnie Bassett guitar - Johnnie Bassett	Jim McCarty guitar & Brett Lucas guitar	Johnnie Bassett guitar - Johnnie Bassett	Johnnie Bassett guitar - Johnnie Bassett			Howard Glazer guitar	Bobby Murray				
Outstanding Blues/R&B Recording	Detroit Women In R&B	Detroit Women Rattle Your Cage	Alberta Adams Detroit's Queen Of The Blues	Alberta Adams Detroit is My Home	Motor City Josh " Forty Four: A Tribute to Howlin' Wolf "	Motor City Josh & The Big Three " It's A Good Life "		Eliza Neals "Messin with a Fool"	The Infatuations Yesterday Morning	Paul Miles Truth, Peace and Justice	Eliza Neals "Breaking And Entering"			
Outstanding Blues/R&B Songwriter	Brett Lucas	Kate Hart	Kate Hart	Paul Miles	Chris Codish	Motor City Josh	Eliza Neals		Tino Gross	Eliza Neals				
Outstanding Blues/R&B Vocalist	Thornetta Davis	Lady T - Detroit Women	Thornetta Davis	Alberta Adams	Thornetta Davis	Thornetta Davis			Thornetta Davis	Thornetta Davis				
Outstanding R&B Artist/Group	Detroit Women in R&B	Detroit Women	Detroit Women With Motor City Express	Howling Diablos	Howling Diablos	Groove Council			The Infatuations					

== Classical ==
Classical	2004	2005	2006	2009	2010	2011	2014	2015	2016	2017	2018	2019
Outstanding Classical Composer	James Hartway	James Hartway	William Bolcom	Michael Daugherty		Scott Gwinnell	Carolyn Striho					
Outstanding Classical Instrumentalist	Robert Demaine - cello	Erv Monroe - flute Detroit Symphony Orchestra	Patricia Masri-Fletcher - harp Detroit Symphony Orchestra	Dennis Carter - flute		Kenneth G. Robinson - Trumpet	John Rutherford trombone					
Outstanding Classical Recording		Kerstin Allvin and James Hartway An Affair Of The Harp	William Bolcom Songs Of Innocence And Of Experience	Kenneth Robinson & Dave Wagner Let The Trumpet Sound		Kenneth Robinson & Lawrence Przybysz - The Perfect Day	Carolyn Striho & Bonnie Kaye Minuet					
Outstanding Classical Small Ensemble	Detroit Chamber Winds and Strings	Detroit Chamber Winds and Strings	Detroit Chamber Winds and Strings	Let the Trumpet Sound: Kenneth Robinson & Special Guests	Il Segreto String Quartet							
Outstanding Classical Vocalist	Dana Lentini	James Moore, Jr. - Detroit Concert Choir	Abha Dearing - The Dearing Concert Duo	Trish Shandor	Trish Shandor	Eva Marie Evola	Eva Marie Evola					
Outstanding Community Orchestra	Birmingham-Bloomfield Symphony	Birmingham-Bloomfield Symphony	Birmingham-Bloomfield Symphony	Michigan Opera Theatre Orchestra		International Symphony Orchestra	Warren Symphony Orchestra					

== Country ==
Country	2004	2005	2006	2009	2010	2011	2014	2015	2016	2017	2018	2019
Outstanding Country Artist/Group	The Wrenfields	Terrie Lea and The Wild Mustangs	Orbitsuns	Grievous Angel	Orbitsuns	Ty Stone & The Truth	Julianne Ankley & The Rogues /The Orbitsuns					
Outstanding Country Instrumentalist	David Mosher - guitar/mandolin Grievous Angel	David Mosher - mandolin/fiddle/guitar Grievous Angel	Sir Tim Duvalier - guitar Orbitsons	Dave Feeny - pedal steel	Drew Howard - pedal steel	Brian "Roscoe" White - guitar	Joey Spina - Guitar and Bass					
Outstanding Country Recording	Forbes Brothers	Volebeats - Country Favorites	The Hummingbirds - Depot Town	Whitey Morgan and the 78's - Honky Tonks and Cheap Motels	Doop and the Inside Outlaws - Everett Belcher	Whitey Morgan and the 78's - I Ain't Drunk	Steve Scott Country - Those Tears I've Cried - the Album					
Outstanding Country Songwriter	Scott and Dennis Forbes	Terrie Lea	Dennis/Scott Forbes	Whitey Morgan	Billy Brandt	Ty Stone	Julianne Ankley					
Outstanding Country Vocalist	Terrie Lea - Terrie Lea and The Wild Mustangs	Terrie Lea - Terrie Lea and The Wild Mustangs	Terrie Lea - Terrie Lea and The Wild Mustangs	Whitey Morgan	Vinnie Dombrowski	Ty Stone	Maggie McCabe					

== Electronic/Dance ==
Electronic/Dance	2004	2005	2006	2009	2010	2011	2014	2015	2016	2017	2018	2019
Outstanding Electronic/Dance Artist/Group	Carl Craig	Amp Fiddler	Amp Fiddler	Jesus Chainsaw Massacre	Detroit Techno Militia	Liz Larin	Cybertrybe					
Outstanding Electronic/Dance DJ	Derrick May	Kevin Saunderson	Kevin Saunderson	DJ Linda Lexy	DJ Linda Lexy	DJ Linda Lexy	DJ Linda Lexy					
Outstanding Electronic/Dance Recording	Various artists Detroit Electronica Coalition	Various artists Movement: Detroit Electronic Music Festival 2004	Adult Gimme Trouble	Daestro Parallelogram	Carolyn Striho Promised Land - Techno	Cybertrybe - Little Monkey - Pain Mix remix	Eprom Colony featuring Meridith Lorde If I Stay I Die					
Outstanding Electronic/Dance Writer/Producer	Kevin Saunderson	Amp Fiddler	Amp Fiddler	Liz Larin	Carl Craig	Liz Larin	Sean Mooer					

== Gospel ==
Gospel	2004	2005	2006	2009	2014	2015	2016	2017	2018	2019
Outstanding Gospel Choir		St Thomas More Church Choir	Fred Hammond and Radicals For Christ							
Outstanding Gospel/Christian Artist/Group	Cece Winans	Beth Stalker	Fred Hammond	God's Army	David Winans pi					
Outstanding Gospel/Christian Musician		Danny Cox - drums/percussion Day 41	Bob Meyer - organ St Thomas More Choir	Ron English - guitar	Marq Andrew Speck - keyboards					
Outstanding Gospel/Christian Recording		Beth Stalker Here With You	J Moss The J Moss Project	God's Army Y R U Ashamed of Me	David Winans pi Troubled Waters					
Outstanding Gospel/Christian Songwriter	Amy Heard	Beth Stalker	Sunnie Day	Danny Cox	Marq Andrew Speck					
Outstanding Gospel/Christian Vocalist	Amy Heard	Beth Stalker	J Moss	Beth Stalker	Marq Andrew Speck					

== Jazz ==
Jazz	2004	2005	2006	2008	2009	2010	2011	2014
Outstanding Jazz Composer	Marcus Belgrave	Marion Hayden	Jeremy Kittel	Scott Gwinnell	Scott Gwinnell	Chris Codish	Scott Gwinnell	Alexander Zonjic
Outstanding Jazz Instrumentalist	Marcus Belgrave - trumpet	Alexander Zonjic - flute	Alexander Zonjic - flute	Marcus Belgrave - trumpet				Skeeto Valdez - drums
Outstanding Jazz Recording	Detroit Experiment	Tumbao Montuno Salad	Jeremy Kittel Jazz Violin		Paul Keller Ensemble Michigan Jazz Suite	Scott Gwinnell Jazz Orchestra - Brush Fire	Planet D Nonet - We Travel The Spaceways; the Music of Sun Ra & Paul Keller Trio - We Like To Riff (TIE)	Planet D Nonet Swingin' The D
Outstanding Jazz Vocalist	Ursula Walker - Buddy Budson and Ursula Walker	Ping Spells - Jazzarray	Jesse Palter - Jesse Palter Quartet	Jesse Palter - Jesse Palter Quartet	Tracy Kash Thomas	Chris Codish	Ursula Walker	Sky Covington
Outstanding Modern Jazz Artist/Group	Marcus Belgrave	Marcus Belgrave	Alexander Zonjic	Scott Gwinnell	Tracy Kash Thomas	Scott Gwinnell Jazz Orchestra	Skeeto's Funhouse	
Outstanding Traditional Jazz Artist/Group	Straight Ahead	Johnny Trudell Orchestra	Hot Club Of Detroit		Scott Gwinnell Jazz Orchestra			Metro Jazz Voices

== Rock/Pop/Alternative ==
Rock/Pop/Alternative	2004	2005	2006	2009	2010	2011	2013	2014	2015	2016	2017	2018	2019
Outstanding Alternative/Indie Artist/Group	The Fags	The Fags	Crud			Nuandré							
Outstanding Hard Rock/Metal Artist/Group	Forge	Broadzilla	Broadzilla										
Outstanding Industrial Artist/Group	Haf/Life	The Impaler		Crud	CyberTrybe	Crud		CyberTrybe					
Outstanding Pop Artist/Group	Liz Larin	Jill Jack	Jill Jack	Ty Stone		Nuandré / Serena Knight (tie)		The Muggs					
Outstanding Rock Artist/Group	The Kingsnakes	The Reefermen	Liz Larin	Broadzilla		Nuandré		Wilson					
Outstanding Rock/Pop Instrumentalist	Jimmy Paluzzi - drums The Fags	Bobby East - guitar The Reefermen	Bobby East - guitar The Reefermen	Rachel May - guitar	Larry Fratangelo - percussion	Jimmy Bones - keyboards		Johnny "Bee" Badanjek - drums					
Outstanding Rock/Pop Recording	Sista Otis and The Wholly Rollers	Mindcandy Recognize	Liz Larin Wake Up, Start Dreaming	The Muggs On With The Show	Carolyn Striho Honesty	Nuandré 3 Soldiers		Howling Diablos Return of the Funk Hand					
Outstanding Rock/Pop Songwriter	Liz Larin	Tim Diaz	Liz Larin	Vinnie Dombroski	Vinnie Dombroski	Nuandré	Eliza Neals	The Infatuations					
Outstanding Rock/Pop Vocalist	Liz Larin	Jezter Soot	Liz Larin	Vinnie Dombroski	Ty Stone	Ty Stone		Bootsey X					

== Urban/Funk/Hip Hop ==
=== Outstanding Hip-Hop Artist/Group ===
==== Winners ====
Winners are listed first and highlighted in bold.

Year	Artist	Ref
2004
2004	Black Bottom Collective	
2005
2005	Buddha Fulla Rhymez	
2006
2006	Paradime	
2007
2007	Trick-Trick	
2008
2008	Black Bottom Collective	
2009
2009	Hush	
2010
2010	Insane Clown Posse	
2011
2011	Paradime	
2012
2012	Hush	
2013
2013	Sean Forbes	
2014
2014	Critical Bill	

=== Outstanding Rap Artist or Group ===
==== Winners and nominees ====
Winners are listed first and highlighted in bold.

Year	Artist	Ref
2019
2019	**Tony "T-Money" Green's Roadwork**	
2019	Blaze Ya Dead Homie	
2019	Pam "P-Dot" Willis	
2019	Ryn Scott	
2019	The R.O.C.	
2019	V-Stylez	
2020
2020	**Trick-Trick**	
2020	Dirty White	
2020	Dope Rhyme Villanz	
2020	Finale	
2020	Icewar Vezzo	
2020	REDD	

=== Outstanding Hip-Hop DJ ===
==== Winners ====
Winners are listed first and highlighted in bold.

Year	Artist	Ref
2004
2004	Black Bottom Collective	
2005
2005	DJ House Shoes	
2006	DJ House Shoes	
2007
2007	DJ House Shoes	
2008
2008	DJ Invisible	
2009	DJ Invisible	
2010	DJ Invisible	
2011
2011	Paradime	
2012
2012	DJ Psycho	
2013	DJ Psycho	
2014	DJ Psycho	

=== Outstanding Rap Producer/DJ ===
==== Winners and nominees ====
Winners are listed first and highlighted in bold.

Year	Artist	Ref
2015
2015	**Volcano**	
2016
2016	**Tony "T-Money" Green**	
2017
2017	**Tony "T-Money" Green**	
2017	DJ Invisible	
2017	Doc Illingsworth	
2017	Freezabag	
2017	Jake Bass	
2017	Nate Harasim	
2017	Nick Speed	
2017	Volcano	
2018
2018	**Gabe Gonzalez**	
2018	Freezabag	
2018	Hush	
2018	Mark Milez a.k.a. Profit	
2018	Nick Speed	
2018	Twiztid	
2019
2019	**Tony "T-Money" Green**	
2019	Foul Mouth	
2019	Freezabag	
2019	Jake Bass	
2019	Mark Milez a.k.a. Profit	
2019	Tim Blackman	
2020
2020	**Tony "T-Money" Green**	
2020	Ilajide	
2020	Jake Bass	
2020	MCV Mowl	
2020	REDD	
2020	Tim Blackman	

=== Outstanding Rap Composer ===
==== Winners and nominees ====
Winners are listed first and highlighted in bold.

Year	Artist	Ref
2015
2015	**Mark Milez** a.k.a. **Profit**	
2016
2016	**Hush**	
2017
2017	**Tony "T-Money" Green**	
2017	Chrissii Key	
2017	Eddie Logix	
2017	Khary Frazier	
2017	Mark Milez a.k.a. Profit	
2017	Pierre Anthony	
2017	Sean Forbes	
2017	Volcano and The New Radio Standard	
2018
2018	**Sean Forbes**	
2018	Chrissii Key	
2018	Hush	
2018	Mahogany Jones	
2018	Mark Milez a.k.a. Profit	
2018	Supa Emcee	
2019
2019	**Supa Emcee**	
2019	Jake Bass	
2019	Mark Milez a.k.a. Profit	
2019	REDD	
2019	Shogun	
2019	Tim Blackman	
2020
2020	**REDD**	
2020	Foul Mouth	
2020	Illy Maine	
2020	Jake Bass	
2020	K-Squeez	
2020	Tim Blackman	

=== Outstanding Hip-Hop MC ===
==== Winners ====
Winners are listed first and highlighted in bold.

Year	Artist	Ref
2004
2004	**Paradime**	
2005	**Paradime**	
2006	**Paradime**	
2007
2007	**King Gordy** and **Shadow**	
2008
2008	**Miz Korona**	
2009
2009	**Hush**	
2010	**Hush**	
2011
2011	**Paradime**	
2012
2012	**Hush**	
2013
2013	**Hush** and **Paradime**	
2014
2014	**Volcano**	

=== Outstanding Rap MC ===
==== Winners and nominees ====
Winners are listed first and highlighted in bold.

Year	Artist	Ref
2015
2015	**Hush**	
2016
2016	**Mark Milez** a.k.a. **Profit**	
2017
2017	**Hush**	
2017	Chrissii Key	
2017	Christina Criss	
2017	Khary Frazier	
2017	K-Squeez	
2017	Mark Milez a.k.a. Profit	
2017	Pierre Anthony	
2017	Volcano	
2018
2018	**Mahogany Jones**	
2018	Doc Waffles	
2018	Kash Doll	
2018	Mark Milez a.k.a. Profit	
2018	Miz Korona	
2018	Sean Forbes	
2019
2019	**Sean Forbes**	
2019	Big Gov	
2019	Leaf Erickson	
2019	Mark Milez a.k.a. Profit	
2019	Supa Emcee	
2019	REDD	
2019	Supa Emcee	
2020
2020	**Leaf Erikson**	
2020	Baybro	
2020	Bryan "Powerdise" Davis	
2020	Icewar Vezzo	
2020	Jashua Smith	
2020	K-Squeez	

=== Outstanding Rap Recording ===
==== Winners and nominees ====
Winners are listed first and highlighted in bold.

Year	Artist	Ref
2015
2015	"**Motor City Miracles**" by **Mark Milez** a.k.a. **Profit**	
2016
2016	"**Detroit-vs-Everybody**" by **Big Herk**, **Big Gov**, **Chedda Boy Malik**, **Poppa D**, **Awesome Dre**, **Wil Louchi**, **Dirty Bird**, **Poe Whosaine**, **Latavia Parker** and **Seven the General**	
2017
2017	"**The Ghetto**" by **Tony "T-Money" Green**	
2017	"From the Way" by Christina Criss	
2017	"Say Ho!" by Def By Stereo featuring DMC	
2017	"Free" by Khary Frazier, Scott Dailey and Carolyn Striho	
2017	"Bump and Grind" by K-Squeez featuring Voyce	
2017	"Gettin' $$" by Magnanomus featuring Volcano and Powerdise (of Critical Bill)	
2017	"Sugar Water" by Mahogany Jones	
2017	"Vibe With You" by Mark Milez a.k.a. Profit	
2017	"First Day Out" by Tee Grizzley	
2018
2018	"**D Cyphered**" by **Nick Speed**	
2018	"Gettin' $$" by Magnanomus featuring Volcano and Powerdise (of Critical Bill)	
2018	"Legend in the Making" by Mark Milez a.k.a. Profit featuring Powerdise	
2018	"Set Fire" by Miz Korona	
2018	"Digital Vodoo" by The R.O.C.	
2018	"The Continuous Evilution of Life's ?'s" by Twiztid	
2019
2019	"**Summer Night**" by **Mark Milez** a.k.a. **Profit**	
2019	"Line King" by Aztek The Barfly	
2019	"Betrayal" by Big Gov featuring Pierre Anthony	
2019	"Chopped Suei" by Chise 3269	
2019	"No Free Tickets" by REDD	
2019	"Heavy on Your Mind" by Roadwork Crew	
2019	"Cha$e the Bag" by Seven the General	
2020
2020	"**Drip 2 Clean**" by **REDD**	
2020	"No One Is Coming" by Baybro	
2020	"It Comes in Threes" by The Chinchillionaires	
2020	"A Canvas of Hope" by Leaf Erickson	
2020	"Bottom of the Bottle" by K-Squeez	
2020	"I'm Free" by Ryn Scott featuring Jon Connor	

Hip hop/Urban/Funk	2004	2005	2006	2009	2014	2016
Outstanding Urban/Funk Artist/Group	The Brothers Groove	Black Bottom Collective	Black Bottom Collective	The Brothers Groove	Howling Diablos	The Infatuations
Outstanding Urban/Funk Musician	Chris Codish - keyboard The Brothers Groove	Freeman Spells - bass Nadir/Distorted Soul	Larry Lee - bass Larry Lee And Back In The Day	Larry Fratangelo - percussion	Skeeto Valdez -drums	Pete Peltier - guitar
Outstanding Urban/Funk Songwriter	Chris Codish	Nadir	Nadir	Chris Codish	Tino Gross	The Infatuations
Outstanding Urban/Funk Vocalist		Valerie Barrymore - Foundation Of Funk	Nadir - Nadir/Distorted Soul	Nadir - Nadir/Distorted Soul	Tosha Owens	Thornetta Davis
Outstanding Urban/Funk/Hip-Hop Recording	Sista Otis and The Wholly Rollers	Nadir/Distorted Soul Distorted Soul 2.0	Black Bottom Collective People Mover	Nadir/Distorted Soul Working For The Man	Howling Diablos Return of the Funk Hand	Mainstreet Soul - "In Detroit", Eminem - "Detroit-vs-Everybody" (Remix)

Reggae/World	2004	2005	2006	2009	2014
Outstanding Reggae/Ska Artist/Group	Immunity	Immunity	Ras Kente And Take No Prisoners Posee	Roots Vibrations	1592
Outstanding World Artist/Group	Atlantez	Blackman and Arnold	Orquesta Sensacional	Lola Morales	The Corktown Popes
Outstanding World/Reggae/Ska Instrumentalist	Eileen Orr - keyboards Atlantez	Kerry Lundquist - keyboards Orchestra Sensational	James Rodriguez - percussion Orquesta Sensacional	Steve Caldwell - guitar	Muruga Booker - Drums & Percussion
Outstanding World/Reggae/Ska Recording	Brazil And Beyond	Nomo Nomo	Brazil And Beyond Sounds Of The Holidays	Nomo Ghost Rock	Muruga Booker, Pandit Samar Saha, & John Churchville Joty Drums
Outstanding World/Reggae/Ska Songwriter		David Asher	Rick Matle	Lola Morales	Joe Kidd & Sheila Burke
Outstanding World/Reggae/Ska Vocalist	Gail Baker - 47Uma	Benny Cruz - Benny Cruz Y La Buena Vida	Pablo Ovalles - Orquesta Sensacional	Lola Morales	Harper (Peter D. Harper)
