= Verlin (surname) =

Verlin is a surname. Notable people with the surname include:

- Don Verlin (born 1965), American basketball coach
- Ronald Verlin Cassill (1919–2002), American writer, editor, painter and lithographer
- Sarana VerLin (born 1953), American singer-songwriter and musician
- Sergey Verlin (born 1974), Russian sprint canoer
