= Sheila Landis =

American jazz musician

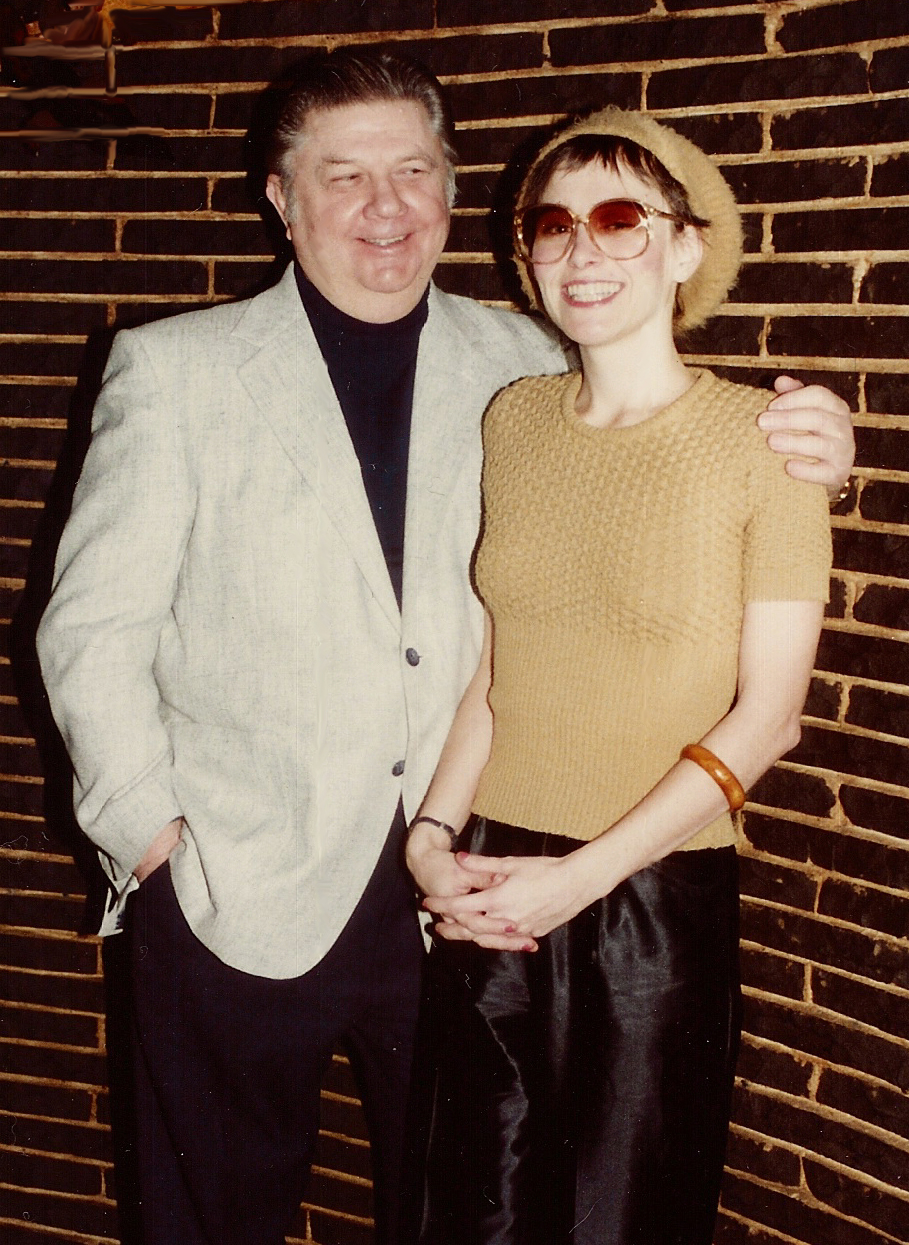
Detroit vocalist Sheila Landis with Baker's Keyboard Lounge owner Clarence Baker

Sheila Catherine Landis (born September 10, 1953, Detroit, Michigan, United States) is an American jazz, R&B vocalist and songwriter.

In 1981, Landis formed her own label, SheLan Records, initially releasing five albums of self-penned material. These original vinyl recordings are avidly sought out world-wide by jazz record collectors. Much of this material has been released internationally on Counterpoint Records UK and Celeste/Vivid Sound in Japan.

In 1990, Landis began working with guitarist/producer Rick Matle in live performance and in the studio. Together they have released over 10 recordings.

Landis is a seven-Time Detroit Music Awards "Outstanding Jazz Vocalist" Winner, along with being recognized for "Outstanding Traditional Jazz Group" and "Outstanding Jazz Composer" (co-winner with Rick Matle).

Landis draws inspiration from vocal artists Sarah Vaughan, Flora Purim and Joni Mitchell. Motown, Brazilian bossa nova and samba, classic rock and pop have also been influences in forming her soulful sound amalgam.

David Nathan, of AllMusic, writes, "Landis has an extraordinarily flexible voice and an uncanny ability to use it to great advantage. She scats, sings ballads, loves Latin rhythms, and can swing. She does jazz, rock, bebop, as well as Latin with absolute equanimity. Although having been on stage for more than 30 years, Landis has never fallen into a rut. Her work continues to exude vitality, excitement, diversity, and originality".

Not content to simply sing and scat in the jazz vocal tradition, Landis takes the lead from vocal innovators Al Jarreau and Bobby McFerrin in expanding her vocal palette to include uncanny imitations of the harmonica, trumpet, flute, synthesizer, string bass and even drums.

== Selected discography ==
Date	Title	Artist	Label
1981	Jazz Rendezvous	Sheila Landis	SheLan Records, re-issued on Celeste/Vivid Sound 2002
1982	Bebop Angel	Sheila Landis	SheLan Records, re-issued on Celeste/Vivid Sound 2002
1996	Fine and Mellow	Rick Matle, Sheila Landis	SheLan Records
1997	The Bird Inside	Sheila Landis, Rick Matle	SheLan Records
1998	Winter Wonderland	Sheila Landis, Rick Matle	SheLan Records
2001	Colors of Brazil	Sheila Landis, Rick Matle	SheLan Records, re-issued on Celeste/Vivid Sound 2002
2002	Riding the Round Pool	Sheila Landis, Rick Matle	SheLan Records
2006	Blues in the Night	Sheila Landis, Rick Matle	SheLan Records
2007	Parenthe-Seizure	Sheila Landis	Counterpoint Records
2010	Heart Plaza	Sheila Landis, Rick Matle	SheLan Records
