= Jill Jack =

American musician

- Origin: Berkley, Michigan
- Genres: Pop/rock, country, Folk/rock, American Standards
- Occupation: Singer-songwriter
- Instruments: Voice, guitar
- Years active: 1997–present
- Label: Uphill Productions
- Website: www.jilljack.com

Jill Jack is an American singer-songwriter based in Ferndale, Michigan. As of December 2016, she has released 11 albums, ranging from soul to rock, to folk and country. She leads a band of the same name, as well as a jazz ensemble dedicated to standards, "Jill Jack and the American Songbook Band."

Three of her CDs – Live and Unplugged in 2005, Moon and the Morning After in 2006, Songwriter Sessions in 2010 – won Detroit Music Awards for Outstanding Acoustic/Folk Recording. Writing for Allmusic, Thom Jurek called Moon and the Morning After, "an exceptionally honest rock & roll record, ... one that delivers musically as well as lyrically in spades and diamonds."

== Discography ==
=== Studio albums ===
Year	Title	Label
1997	Watch Over Me	Drum Dancer
1998	Too Close to the Sun	Drum Dancer
2001	The Love Hotel	Drum Dancer
2006	Moon and the Morning After	Uphill Productions
2012	Sunflower Girl	Uphill Productions
2015	Moon Be Thine	Uphill Productions
2016	Pure Imagination (as Jill Jack and the American Songbook Band)	Uphill Productions
2018	These Days	

=== Live albums ===
Year	Title	Label
1999	Live From Billy's Basement	Drum Dancer
2004	Live and Unplugged	Uphill Productions
2009	Songwriter Sessions	Uphill Productions
2013	Celebrates the Holidays	Uphill Productions

=== Singles ===
Year	Title
2008	Live Like There's No Tomorrow
2014	Look Beyond Your Horizons (Single from The Embrace of Aging) (feat. The Detroit Women's Project)
2017	Be the Light (A Song for Leonard)
2020	Quiet Man
2020	Jamestown Town
2021	Bit of a Jesus Girl
2025	Soulshine
2026	Give Me That Beat Once Again

== Awards ==
=== Detroit Music Awards ===
Year	Nominee / work	Award	Result
1997	Jill Jack	Outstanding Vocalist (Pop/Rock)	Won
1997	Jill Jack	New Group/Performer Deserving Wider Recognition	Won
1998	Jill Jack	Outstanding Artist/Group (Acoustic/Folk)	Won
1998	Jill Jack	Outstanding Local Artist/Group (Rock/Pop)	Won
1998	Jill Jack	Outstanding New Group (Acoustic/Folk)	Won
1998	Watch Over Me	Outstanding Recording (Acoustic/Folk)	Won
1998	Jill Jack	Outstanding Vocalist (Acoustic/Folk)	Won
1998	Jill Jack	Outstanding Vocalist (Rock/Pop)	Won
1999	Jill Jack	Outstanding Vocalist (Rock/Pop)	Won
1999	Jill Jack	Outstanding Artist/Group (Pop/Rock)	Won
2000	Jill Jack	Outstanding Vocalist (Pop/Rock)	Won
2005	Jill Jack Live And Unplugged	Outstanding Recording (Acoustic/Folk)	Won
2005	Jill Jack	Outstanding Artist/Group (Pop/Rock)	Won
2006	Jill Jack	Outstanding Acoustic Artist/Group	Won
2006	Moon and the Morning After	Outstanding Acoustic/Folk Recording	Won
2006	Jill Jack	Outstanding Acoustic/Folk Songwriter	Won
2006	Jill Jack	Outstanding Acoustic/Folk Vocalist	Won
2006	Jill Jack	Outstanding Pop Artist/Group	Won
2007	Jill Jack	Outstanding Acoustic Artist/Group	Won
2007	Jill Jack	Outstanding Acoustic/Folk Vocalist	Won
2008	Jill Jack	Outstanding Acoustic Artist/Group	Won
2008	Jill Jack	Outstanding Acoustic/Folk Vocalist	Won
2010	Songwriter Sessions	Outstanding Acoustic/Folk Recording	Won
2010	Jill Jack	Outstanding Acoustic/Folk Vocalist	Won
2011	Jill Jack	Outstanding Acoustic/Folk Songwriter	Won
2011	Jill Jack	Outstanding Acoustic Artist/Group	Won
2012	Jill Jack	Outstanding Acoustic/Folk Songwriter	Won
2012	Jill Jack	Outstanding Folk Artist/Group	Won
2013	Sunflower Girl	Outstanding Acoustic/Folk Recording	Won
2013	Jill Jack	Outstanding Folk Artist/Group	Won
2014	Jill Jack	Outstanding Acoustic/Folk Songwriter	Won
2014	Jill Jack	Outstanding Folk Artist/Group	Won
2015	Jill Jack	Outstanding Americana Songwriter	Won

=== Other ===
Year	Award	Category	Nominee(s)	Result	Ref.
2011	International Songwriting Competition	Americana	Fallen (A Love Song)	Semi-finalist	
2011	Susanne Millsap's Performing Songwriter Showcase		Jill Jack	Finalist	
