= Citizen Zero =

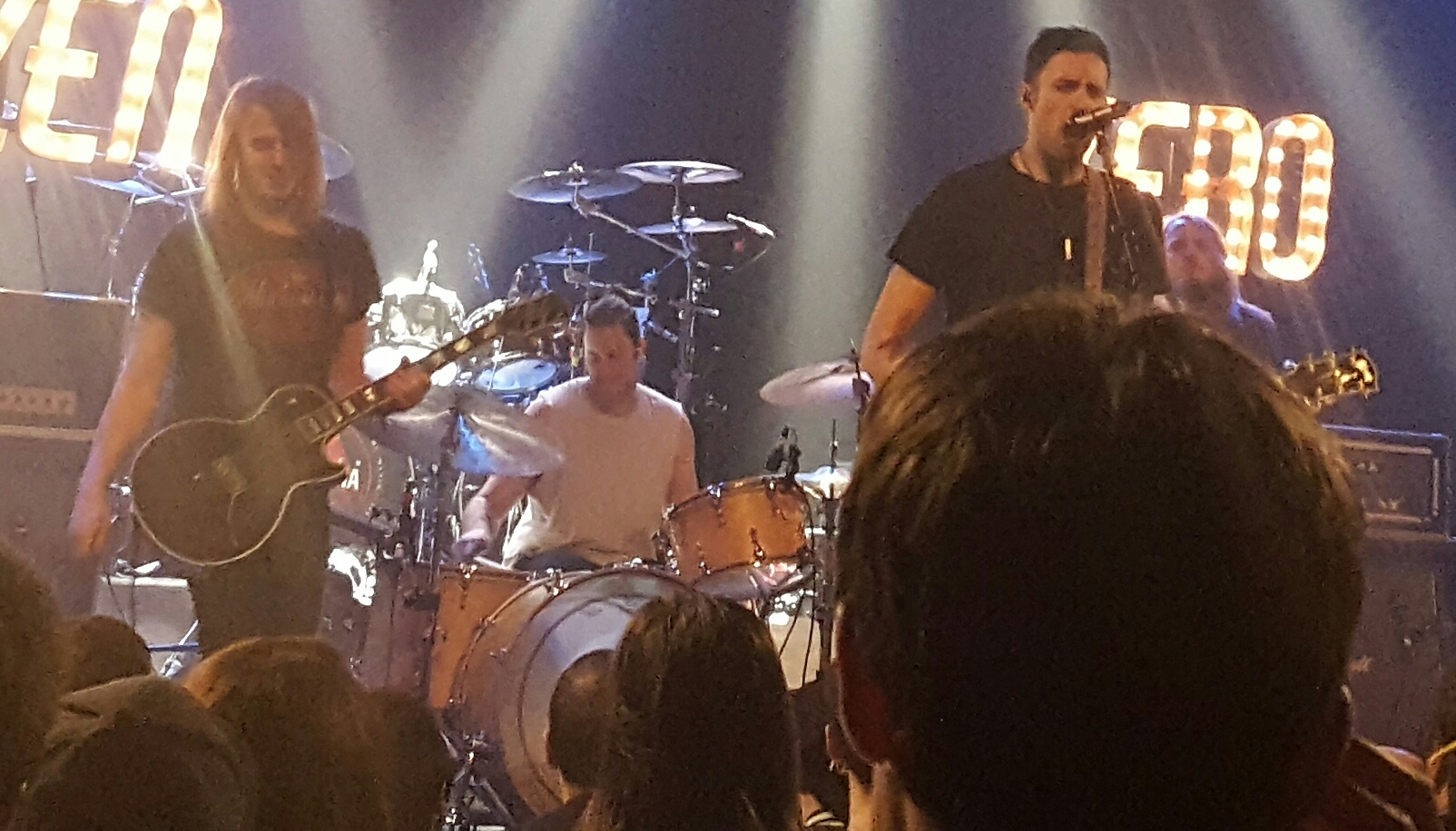

Background information
- Origin: Detroit, Michigan, United States
- Genres: Hard rock, post-grunge
- Years active: 2010–2018, 2025
- Label: Wind-up
- Members: Josh LeMay; Sammy Boller; John Dudley; Sam Collins
- Past members: Matt Dudley (died 2012); Greg Dudley
- Website: http://site.wearecitizenzero.com/

Citizen Zero is an American hard rock band from Detroit, Michigan. The band was founded in Rochester Hills in 2010 by Greg Dudley (bass), John Dudley (drums), Matt Dudley (guitar) and vocalist Josh LeMay (FMR Mayyle).

Citizen Zero's eponymous debut EP was recorded in 2011 at Rustbelt Studios, in collaboration with Kid Rock's recording engineer Al Sutton. In 2012, the band recruited guitarist Sammy Boller, following the death of Matt Dudley amidst the production of their second EP, Life Explodes. In 2016, Citizen Zero secured a deal with Wind-Up Records and released debut studio album, State of Mind. Their debut single "Go (Let Me Save You)" peaked at #17 on the mainstream rock chart. The band came out of hiatus for a performance at the Machine Shop in Flint, Michigan on November 14th, 2025.

== Awards ==
Citizen Zero received the Detroit Music Award for Outstanding Rock/Pop Recording in 2013.

== Personnel ==
- Josh LeMay - Lead Vocalist/Guitarist (2010–present)
- Sammy Boller - Lead Guitarist (2013–2018)
- John Dudley - Drummer (2010-2018)
- Sam Collins - Bassist (2015–present)

=== Former ===
- Matt Dudley - Lead Guitarist (2010-2012)
- Greg Dudley - Bassist (2010-2015)

== Studio albums ==
=== State of Mind ===
State of Mind

Studio album by Citizen Zero
- Released: August 12, 2016
- Label: Wind-up Records

Singles from State of Mind
- 1. "Go (Let Me Save You)" Released: May 18, 2016; 2. "Lure and Persuade" Released: January 26, 2017; 3. "What a Feeling" Released: June 14, 2017

State of Mind is Citizen Zero's debut studio album.

=== Track listing ===
No.	Title	Length
1.	"What a Feeling"	4:14
2.	"Go (Let Me Save You)"	4:38
3.	"Save the Queen"	4:08
4.	"State of Mind"	3:15
5.	"Come Away"	4:39
6.	"Lure and Persuade"	3:05
7.	"Love Let It"	3:59
8.	"Applause and Fame"	4:59
9.	"When the Rain Comes"	4:16
10.	"Bangin' In the Nails"	4:05
11.	"Home"	4:31

== Extended plays ==
- Citizen Zero (2011)
- Life Explodes (2012)

== Singles ==
List of singles, with selected chart positions, showing year released and album name
Title	Year	Peak chart positions	Album
Title	Year	US Main. Rock	Album
"Go (Let Me Save You)"	2016	17	State of Mind
"Lure and Persuade"	2017	31	State of Mind
"What a Feeling"	2017	—	State of Mind

== Music videos ==
Year	Song	Director
2016	"Go (Let Me Save You)"	Adam Green
2017	"Lure & Persuade" (Live)	—N/a
2017	"What a Feeling"	Mike Rodway
