= Eliza Neals =

American musician and record producer (born 1974)

- Born: Elizabeth Thomasian Neals; February 8, 1974 (age 52); Detroit, Michigan, United States
- Genres: Blues rock
- Occupations: Singer, songwriter, pianist, record producer, arranger
- Years active: 1990s–present
- Website: Official website

Elizabeth Thomasian Neals (born February 8, 1974), known professionally as Eliza Neals, is an American blues rock singer, songwriter, pianist, record producer, and arranger.

== Early life and education ==
Neals was born in Detroit, Michigan and raised in Southfield, Michigan. She studied opera at Wayne State University, where she earned a Bachelor of Arts in music.

== Musical career ==
Early in her musical career, Neals performed at venues in Detroit. In the mid-1990s, she signed with Blarritt Records, a label founded by Barrett Strong. She released her debut album, I Want More, in 1997 under the stage name "Eliza." Eliza's second album, I'm Waiting, was released in 1999. Neals also contributed as a co-writer and co-producer on Barrett Strong's 2008 album Stronghold II. Neals has cited Barrett Strong and Joe Louis Walker as musical influences. She herself released the four albums recorded between 2005 and 2015.

In 2015, she received the Detroit Music Award for Outstanding Blues/R&B Songwriter.

In 2017, Neals wrote or co-wrote original music for 10,000 Feet Below, released on E-H Records, and featuring guitarists Billy Davis and Paul Nelson.

Neals was named Blues Artist of the Year at the Detroit Black Music Awards in 2018. Several of her releases have been nominated for awards issued by the Detroit Music Awards. In 2019, Eliza Neals and the Narcotics (180 gram vinyl) and the EP Sweet or Mean were released on July 4, on E-H Records. Sweet or Mean's production was overseen by Popa Chubby and included horn work by Ian Hendrickson-Smith and Michael Leonhart.

Neals released Black Crow Moan in 2020, describing it as "more sentimental; a lot of stuff coming from way, way back... More like a confessional." It featured guest appearances from Joe Louis Walker and Derek St. Holmes. Black Crow Moan has been described as primarily ballad-driven and partly a reflection on her idols from her "growing up years."

In 2022, Neals re-released the single ''Sugar Daddy'', written by Barrett Strong and featuring King Solomon Hicks on guitar. The song received airplay on Sirius XM Bluesville. Neals wrote or co-wrote all songs on the album, arranged and co-produced the collection with Michael Puwal. The album featured Neals on vocals and piano, with contributions from Lance Lopez (guitar), Peter Keys (Hammond organ), and Billy Davis (guitar on the track 'Got A Gun'). Paul Randolph played bass guitar on two songs. The album also included Neals' cover of the Steve Winwood song, 'Can't Find My Way Home'.

Neals released the album Colorcrimes in 2024, featuring 24 collaborators worldwide.

Neals performed at the 2017 and 2019 Ann Arbor Blues and Jazz Festival. She has supported performances by Barrett Strong, Joe Louis Walker, Popa Chubby, Peter Keys, George Clinton, Four Tops, Tony Joe White, Mike Zito, Tommy Castro, Walter Trout, Albert Castiglia, Micki Free, Victor Wainwright, and Solomon Hicks.

== Discography ==
Albums:

Year	Title	Record label	Additional credits
1997	I Want More	Blarritt Records	Eliza
1999	I'm Waiting	Blarritt Records	Eliza
2005	Liquorfoot	Self-released	
2008	No Frogs for Snakes	Self-released	
2012	Messin With a Fool	Self-released	
2015	Breaking and Entering	Self-released	
2017	10,000 Feet Below	E-H Records	
2019	Eliza Neals and the Narcotics	E-H Records	Eliza Neals and the Narcotics
2019	Sweet or Mean (EP)	E-H Records	Produced by Popa Chubby
2020	Black Crow Moan	E-H Records	
2022	Badder to the Bone	E-H Records	
2024	Colorcrimes	E-H Records	
2026	Thunder In The House	E-H Records	
