= Doop and the Inside Outlaws =

Musical act

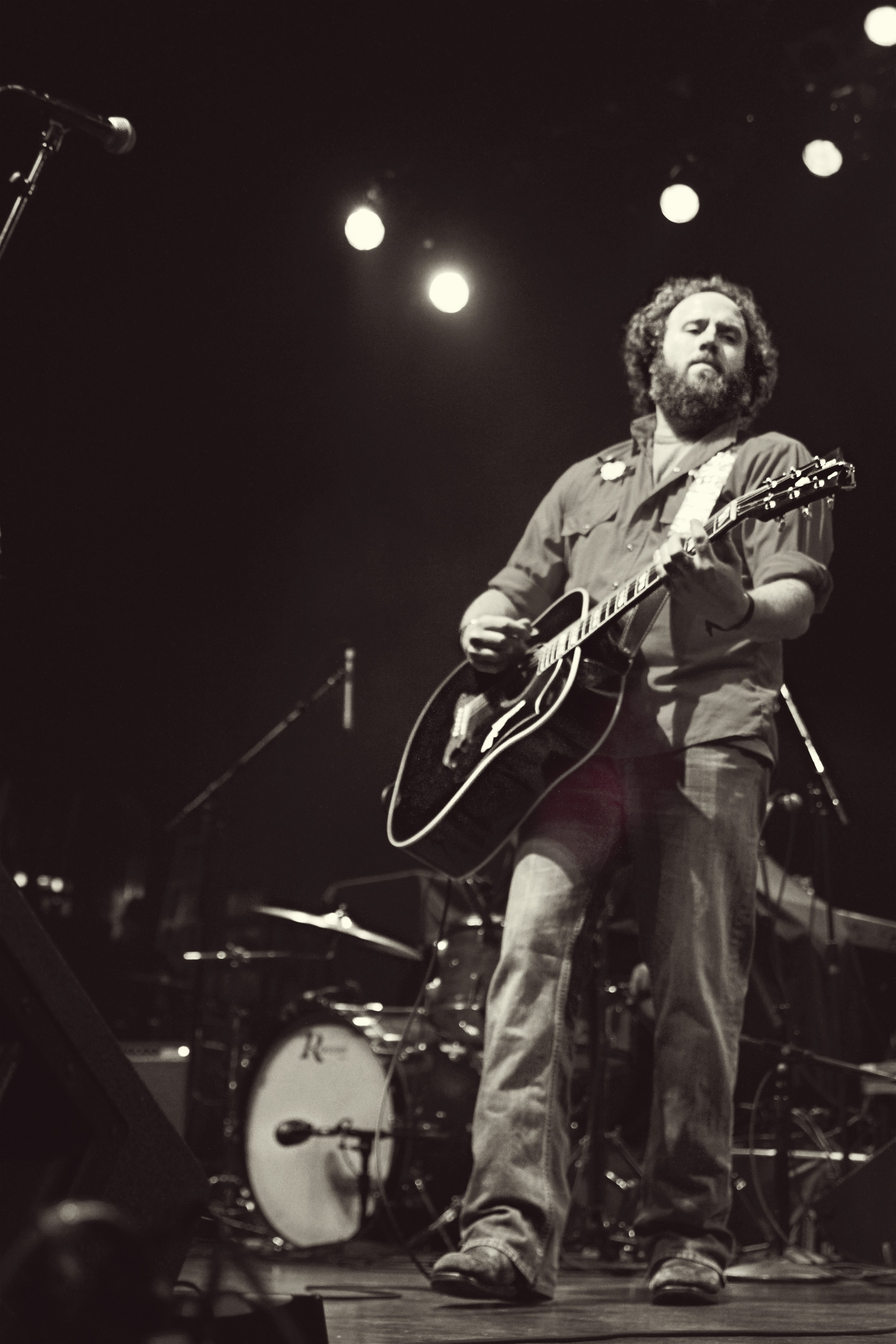
- Don "Doop" Duprie performs with his band Doop and the Inside Outlaws in Detroit November 25, 2011.

Background information
- Origin: Detroit, Michigan, United States
- Genres: Alternative country, roots rock
- Years active: 2007–present
- Labels: Independent
- Members: Don "Doop" Duprie; Pete Ballard; Katie Grace; Danny Kanka
- Website: doopandtheinsideoutlaws.com

Doop and the Inside Outlaws is an alternative country, roots rock band from the Detroit, MI area.

== Background ==
Don "Doop" Duprie is a singer-songwriter and front man for the band that he formed in 2007. A laid off firefighter born and raised in industrial River Rouge, Michigan, Doop writes songs that reflect his deep working-class roots. He teamed up with legendary Detroit producer Jim Diamond at Ghetto Recorders to record the band's three albums. Current members of the band include Pete Ballard on the pedal steel guitar, Katie Grace on bass and Danny Kanka on drums.

== Discography ==
- Blood River, released July 2007
- Everett Belcher, released August 2009
- What am I supposed to do?, released October 2011

== Awards ==
Doop has garnered multiple Detroit Music Awards nominations for Country Artist, Songwriter, Vocalist and for the first two albums. The band won the 2010 Detroit Music Awards ‘Outstanding Country Recording’ award for “Everett Belcher.”

== National Recognition ==
Doop was a featured guest interview on the American Public Media radio show The Story with Dick Gordon and the award-winning podcast Digivegas.com. The albums made the Top Ten Lists in Metro Times and Americana Roots.com, and acquired many favorable reviews from music magazines and websites across the globe. His songs were also featured on the 1 rated Americana podcast, “Americana Roots Roundtable” on No Depression.com and Country Music Pride's podcast Americana Daily named “Everett Belcher” the “Album of the Day.”
