= Steve Scott (singer-songwriter) =

American singer-songwriter and actor

Stephen Joseph Scott
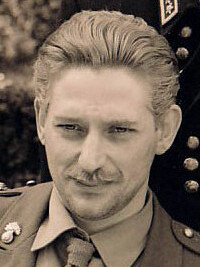
- Scott on the set of Soldato ignoto (1995)

Background information
- Also known as: Lorenzo Wilde (acting)
- Origin: Newark, New Jersey
- Genres: Americana; country
- Occupations: Singer-songwriter; record producer; actor
- Instruments: Vocals; acoustic guitar; electric guitar; electric bass; mandolin; mandocello; piano; keyboards
- Years active: 1992–present
- Label: BonaVita Records
- Website: Official website

Steve Scott is an American musician, producer, writer, and actor from New Jersey. His music style combines classic pop/rock arrangements and rhythm sections with traditional bluegrass, which he has termed "rustbelt country".

== Early life and education ==
Scott was raised by a single mother in a poor Irish Catholic family in Newark, New Jersey with his three older siblings. Both of his brothers later became United States Marines. Scott's interest in music started at an early age, influenced by his family members. Peter De Santa, a guitar teacher, became his mentor and inspiration. While attending high school in Union, New Jersey, he was nicknamed Lucius by friends. Scott went on to junior college where he studied theatre arts. He was later accepted to the NYU Tisch School of the Arts in Manhattan, where he honed his acting skills. Steve graduated summa cum laude from the University of Arizona with a bachelor's degree in history and pre-law. He attended Thomas M. Cooley Law School in Lansing, Michigan for graduate school. He completed all of his Post Graduate Master's Studies in History at The University of Edinburgh, Scotland; and, is an alumnus, essayist, and author associated with the School of History, Classics & Archeology - Earning a Master's level Post Graduate Degree in the Science of History with Merit from The University of Edinburgh's MSc Program in History 2024.

== Career ==
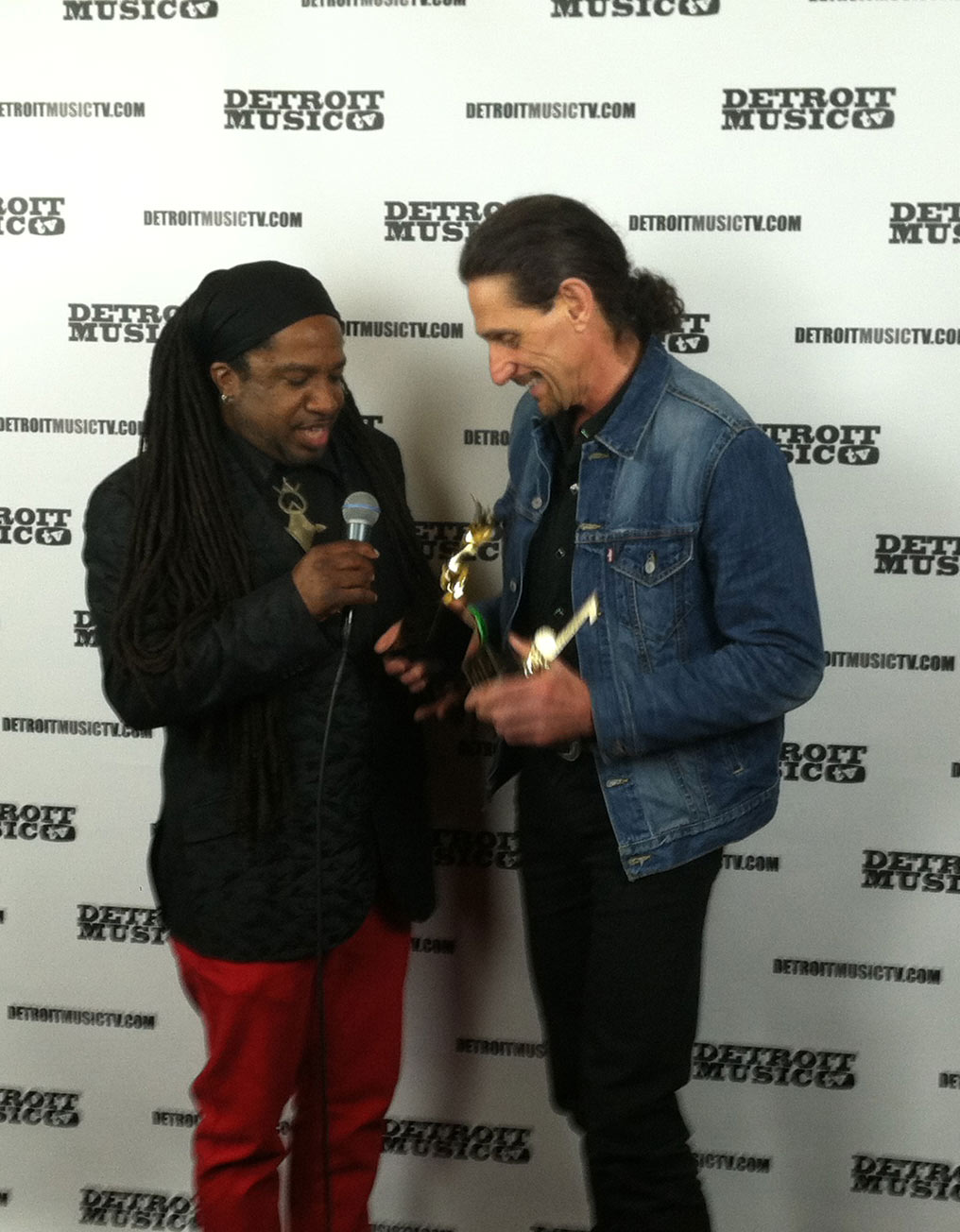
Scott (right) being interviewed at the Detroit Music Awards (2014)

Scott used the stage name Lorenzo Wilde when acting. In 1995, he played Captain Pringle in Unknown Soldier, an Italian film directed by Marcello Aliprandi. In 1996, he appeared in Celluloide and Daylight. In 1998, he played a cavalry lieutenant in Gunslinger's Revenge. In 2017, he was cast in The Bailout, directed by John Comiskey and Conall Morrison, as Timothy Geithner.

As of 2014, Scott was living in Detroit. In the 1980s, he was a guitarist in the pop/rock band The Features. In 2012, he released his debut album, Shinin’ Like You Do. The music was influenced by traditional Americana and featured country pop rock, gospel, and blues and cowboy ballads. It included a cover of "Rocky Top." All proceeds from his single "Have You Ever Known a Soldier" went to the military charity Wish For Our Heroes. The song was inspired by his wife's work with the Army's STARRS program.

Scott's 2013 album Those Tears I've Cried won Outstanding Country Recording and the single "I Think About You" won the People's Choice Award at the Detroit Music Awards in 2014. The album reached #1 in the Roots Music Michigan Charts; #11 in the Relix Magazine radio chart; and #30 in the Roots Music Report Americana album chart. In 2014, he toured Europe to promote his album. In 2020, he released his third album, No Love For the Common Man, which he wrote and produced.

As of 2024, Scott resided in Philadelphia. He published his first history book Class Distinctions thru History in Review on December 15, 2024, in which he examines history through a historical materialist class-oriented lens, focus, and analysis. Scott has also been published in publications such as Black Agenda Report, Hampton Institute, Toward Freedom, Dissident Voice, Midwestern Marx, Sublation Magazine, CineAction, Counter-Currents, and The Bullet.

== Discography ==
- Shinin' Like You Do (2012)
- Those Tears I've Cried (2013)
- No Love for the Common Man (2020)

== Filmography ==
Year	Title	Role	Director	Ref
1995	Unknown Soldier	Captain Pringle	Marcello Aliprandi	
1996	Daylight	TB marketing executive	Rob Cohen	
1996	Celluloide	Harry Feist	Carlo Lizzani	
1997	Gunslinger's Revenge	Cavalry lieutenant	Giovanni Veronesi	
1999	Excellent Cadavers	Reporter #1	Ricky Tognazzi	
2017	The Bailout	Timothy Geithner	John Comiskey, Conall Morrison	

== History Essays ==
N	Essay	Publication	Published Date
1	Maremma Sulfurous and Sensual Thermal Bath	GoNomad	10/20/2018
2	MLK and the Socialist Within	Black Agenda Report	1/27/2021
3	The Myth of American Exceptionalism	Toward Freedom	9/20/2021
4	The Moment King Was Slain	Dissident Voice	4/4/2022
5	Better Red Than Dead	Sublation Magazine	11/11/2022
6	What Hollywood Communicates Through the Movie Green Book: Race, Ethnicity, National Identity, Gender, Culture and Class in 1962 America	CineAction	4/24/2023
7	Between Crosshairs a Man and his Revolution	MidWestern Marx	7/7/2023
8	Ideology and Hypocrisy Amid Slavery and Democracy - Strange Bedfellows from Time Immemorial	Hampton Institute	8/27/2023
9	Governance, Race, Property and Profit	The Bullet	2/27/2024
10	Where the Negroes Are Masters (Book Review)	Counter Currents	3/18/2024

== Bibliography ==
- 2024: Class Distinctions thru History in Review, Gael Publishing, ISBN 979-8302098122.
