= Julianne Ankley =

American singer-songwriter and visual artist

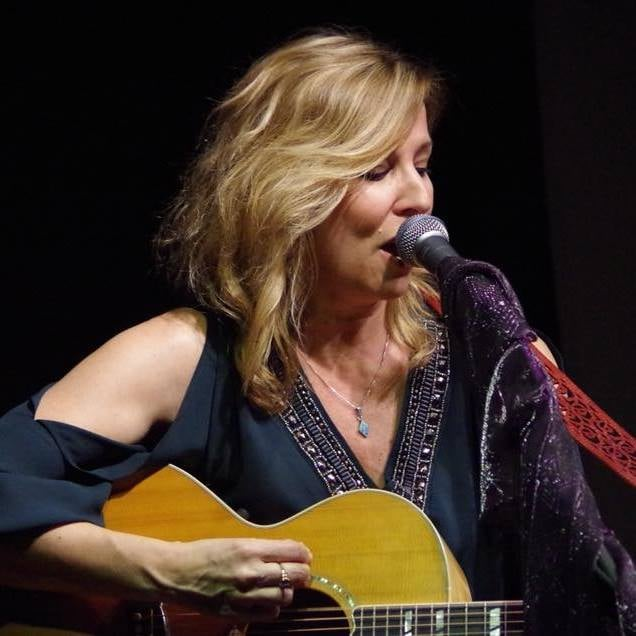
- Ankley in 2018

Background information
- Born: Port Huron, Michigan
- Origin: SE Michigan
- Genres: Americana, Country, Blues & Rock
- Occupation: Singer/Songwriter/Visual Artist
- Instruments: Guitar & Piano
- Years active: 2005 – present
- Label: Indigo Violet Music (BMI)
- Website: www.julianneankley.com www.julianneankleyart.com

Julianne Ankley is a singer/songwriter and visual artist from southeast Michigan. She has won a total of fifteen Detroit Music Awards, and two Michigan Music Awards including Outstanding Country Vocalist and Outstanding Country Recording at the 2021 Detroit Music Awards. At the inaugural Michigan Music Awards in 2025, Julianne won the Best Americana Single/Performance Award for her single "What Makes You Dance." Julianne's musical influences include: Motown, Americana, Country Music, and Blues.

Ankley has performed the national anthem for the Detroit Red Wings, the Detroit Tigers, the Toledo Mud Hens, and for nine seasons was the "Voice of the Icehawks" for the Port Huron IHL Icehawks.

== Milestones ==
In 2010, Ankley was a finalist in the Merlefest Songwriter Competition for her song: "It Ain't Over"

In 2011, Ankley was named one of the Best Country Music Artists in Detroit.

Songs and Stories: Detroit PBS Spotlights Julianne Ankley & The Rogues. Biography, interview and performance video. Julianne's music and the Detroit music scene.

Ankley performed her original song, "Christmas in Your Heart," at the "2016 America's Thanksgiving Day Parade" in Detroit, MI.

Port Huron singer and painter brings both talents to Highland exhibit. Julianne discussed her music, art and what drives her.

Ankley was named Blue Water Woman Musician of the Year in 2020 for musical contributions.

Singer/songwriter and visual artist, Julianne Ankley has combined her talents for audiences.

Releasing an album during a pandemic: Artist Spotlight - Julianne Ankley

During the pandemic of 2020-2021, Ankley performed free live concerts online to help boost morale and entertain. She also participated in online benefit concert(s) during this time.

She continues to tour nationally and has played smaller venues to large music festivals.

== Discography ==
- It Ain't Over (EP) 2009
- Vivid (LP) 2011
- He's Still My Boy (Single) 2012
- Christmas in Your Heart (Single) 2012
- Don't Let Go (LP) 2015
- Raining for You (Single) 2017
- Why (Single) 2019
- With Love from Lake Huron (LP) 2020
- What Makes You Dance (Single) 2024 - Winner, Americana Best single, Michigan Music Awards 2025
- Polar Train (Single) 2025 – Winner, Americana Best single, Michigan Music Awards 2026
