= Rick Matle =

American rock and jazz guitarist

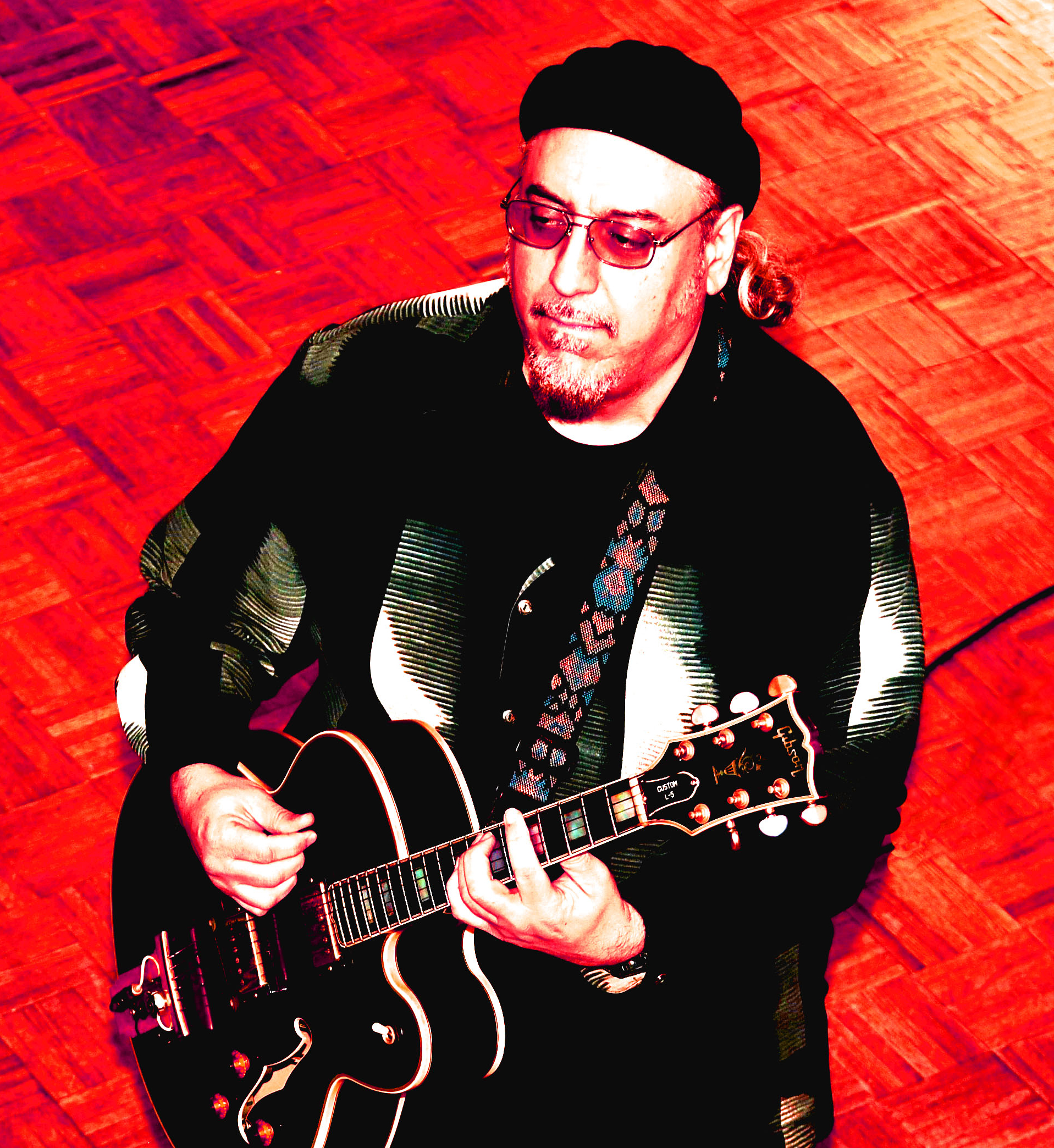

Background information
- Born: July 6, 1963 (age 62)
- Genres: Rock, jazz
- Occupation: Musician
- Instrument: Guitar
- Years active: 2000–present

Rick Matle (born July 6, 1963) is an American rock and jazz guitarist. He has performed with jazz vocalist Sheila Landis since the early 1990s. All Music Guide's David Nathan writes "Matle's cool style, digital dexterity, and clean sound reflects the influences of the two jazz guitar players he admires the most: Joe Pass and Kenny Burrell. His ability to create a melange of sonics from the guitar comes from his other two major blues and rock influences: Carlos Santana and Jimi Hendrix."

Matle has won Detroit Music Awards for composition, twice in the "World Music" category and once for "Jazz Composition".
