= Sammy Boller =

American guitarist and songwriter

- Born: Detroit, Michigan, U.S.
- Genres: Rock; hard rock; heavy metal; instrumental rock
- Occupations: Guitarist; songwriter
- Instrument: Guitar
- Years active: 2010s–present
- Label: CandyRat Records

Sammy Boller is an American guitarist and songwriter from Detroit, Michigan. He is known for his work as a instrumentalist, his tenure with the rock band Citizen Zero, and his work as a touring guitarist. Boller has also contributed instructional articles to Guitar World and has released music through Candyrat Records.

== Early life and education ==
Boller is from the Detroit metropolitan area. He attended the University of Michigan's School of Music, Theatre & Dance.

== Career ==
=== Citizen Zero ===
Boller joined the Detroit rock band Citizen Zero in 2012.

In 2012, Boller entered Guitar Center's "Master Satriani" competition, performing Joe Satriani's instrumental song "Satch Boogie". Satriani selected Boller as one of the competition's winners.

Citizen Zero signed with Wind-up Records in 2016 and released its debut studio album, State of Mind, that year. The album's single "Go (Let Me Save You)" reached number 17 on the Billboard Mainstream Rock chart.

=== Solo career ===
Following his departure from Citizen Zero, Boller began developing instrumental guitar compositions. His debut solo album, Kingdom of the Sun, was released by Candyrat Records on March 20, 2020.

The album was recorded at Rustbelt Studios in Detroit and mixed by David Bendeth. It consists of 11 instrumental tracks, including "Kingdom of the Sun", and "Cloak of Light"

Guitar World profiled Boller in 2020 in connection with the album, describing him as part of a new generation of instrumental guitarists and discussing his approach to melody, composition and guitar technique.

Boller released the single "Path of the Heart" in November 2020 and "Ritual Lights" in 2021. Guitar World subsequently published a feature on "Ritual Lights".

In 2022, Boller released the single "Spellbound".

=== Touring ===
Boller has performed as a touring guitarist for other rock artists. He has performed with Scott Stapp of Creed since 2019. In 2024, he filled in for Tesla guitarist Frank Hannon for several performances after the death of the Tesla guitarist's father in law, Dickey Betts.

In 2025, Boller joined the Goo Goo Dolls on their Summer Anthem tour as a touring guitarist after Brad Fernquist suffered a shoulder injury.

=== Midnight Garden ===
In November 2025, Boller released the instrumental EP Midnight Garden. The EP was his first major solo release following Kingdom of the Sun and incorporated two-handed tapping and expanded-range guitar techniques.

Guitar World reported that the EP was produced with Nick Sampson and recorded at studios in Michigan. The article also noted Boller's use of an eight-string Ibanez guitar loaned to Sampson by Polyphia guitarist Tim Henson.

== Musical style ==
Boller's music is primarily instrumental and incorporates elements of rock, hard rock, heavy metal and progressive guitar music. His playing has been associated with two-handed tapping, sweep picking and other technically demanding techniques.

In a 2020 interview with Guitar World, Boller described melody as a central part of his songwriting process and discussed his interest in instrumental guitar music.

== Discography ==
=== Studio albums ===
- Kingdom of the Sun (2020)

=== Extended plays ===
- Midnight Garden (2025)

=== Singles ===
- "Path of the Heart" (2020)
- "Ritual Lights" (2021)
- "Spellbound" (2022)

== With Citizen Zero ==
- State of Mind (2016)

== See also ==
- Citizen Zero
- Joe Satriani
- Guitar World
