= The Fags =

American pop punk band

- Origin: Detroit, Michigan, United States
- Genres: Pop-punk; alternative rock
- Years active: 1999–2006; 2017
- Label: Idol Records
- Past members: John Liccardello (aka John Speck), Tim Patalan and Jimmy Paluzzi

The Fags were a pop-punk band from Detroit, Michigan. Founded in 1999 by John Speck (John Liccardello), Tim Patalan and Jimmy Paluzzi, the name is an abbreviation of "Smokin' Fags", a reference to smoking a "fag" (cigarette).

== Background ==
After the dissolution of his band Hoarse in 1998, singer-guitarist John Speck decided to start a new band with fellow band-mate, Jimmy Paluzzi. From 1992 to 1994, Paluzzi had been the founding drummer with the band Sponge. Liccardello and Paluzzi recruited bassist Tim Patalan to round out their trio.

In 1999, the trio recorded a five-song EP at Patalan’s studio and released it on Idol Records. At their first show at Jacoby's in Detroit, Paluzzi gave the name, "Smokin' Fags", for the show. The show was successful and generated buzz about the new band - so the name stuck.

In 2003, the band toured with X.

In June 2004, the band was signed to Sire Records by Seymour Stein. They then went to The Loft where they recorded their first full-length album which eventually would become, Light 'Em Up . However, due to management problems with Sire and its parent Warner Records, the album was never released. This left the band unable to tour in support of the album. Eventually, the band was released by Sire and they were able to reclaim their tapes. They turned back to Idol Records and released the album on October 31, 2005.

The album Light 'em up received critical acclaim and was #32 on Spin's list of the forty best records of 2006. However, internal tensions between the band members exacerbated by the struggle to get the album released led to the band splitting up. They released the EP Tour after they split.

They reformed in 2017 and released a compilation of unreleased originals and newly recorded cover songs, I’m With Her. In retrospect, members of the band believe that their name may have hindered their success.

== Discography ==
=== Albums ===
- Light 'em up – 2006
- I'm with her – 2023

=== EPs ===
- The Fags – 2002
- Tour – 2007

=== Compilations ===
- Seattle Syndrome Volume One

== Awards ==
- Detroit Music Awards - Outstanding Alternative/Indie Artist/Group (2004 & 2005)
