= InsideOut Literary Arts =

Literary nonprofit organization

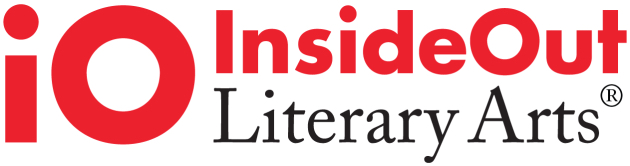
InsideOut Literary Arts current logo

InsideOut Literary Arts (InsideOut) is a 501(c)(3) literary nonprofit organization based in Detroit, Michigan, that uses creative writing and poetry programs to build students' literary and academic skills. InsideOut provides opportunities for Detroit students to work with professional writers through a school-based Writers-in-Residence program, afterschool programming, and community events.

InsideOut programs currently serve over 2,000 youth annually in classrooms, community sites, and online. The organization has served over 65,000 students since its founding in 1995.

== History ==
=== Inception ===
InsideOut was founded by former school teacher and poet Dr. Terry Blackhawk in 1995. Before founding InsideOut, Blackhawk, a creative writing teacher at Mumford High School in Detroit, had already been inviting poets to her classroom to introduce students to poetry. Bob Shaye, film producer and an alumnus of Mumford High School noticed Blackhawk's work and invited Blackhawk to apply for a grant from his charitable organization, the Four Friends Foundation. After successfully receiving funding, InsideOut implemented its first Writer-in-Residence program in five Detroit high schools in 1995.

The name "InsideOut" was chosen by Blackhawk's students, inspired by a 10th grade student who said "'[When we write] we are bringing what is inside of us out into the world.'"

In 1997, Blackhawk founded Citywide Poets, InsideOut's national award-winning afterschool creative writing and spoken word program for teens.

=== Growth and recognition ===
By 2000 InsideOut's writer-in-residence program had expanded to 21 schools including elementary and middle schools. In the following years InsideOut established partnerships with institutions of higher education including the University of Michigan, Wayne State University, and Marygrove College. InsideOut also organized events and programs in collaboration with the Detroit Institute of Arts, Detroit Opera House, and other local cultural institutions, which have developed into longstanding partnerships.

In 2009 InsideOut received the National Arts and Humanities Youth Program Award (previously the "Coming Up Taller" award) in recognition of its Citywide Poets program. InsideOut was recognized in a ceremony at the White House with First Lady Michelle Obama and performed at the Kennedy Center. In 2011, InsideOut students also participated in a poetry workshop at the White House.

In 2013 InsideOut was featured in the PBS NewsHour special "Where Poetry Lives," a nation-wide series hosted by PBS Chief arts correspondent Jeffrey Brown and U.S. Poet Laureate Natasha Trethewey.

In 2015 Blackhawk edited and published To Light a Fire: 20 Years with the InsideOut Literary Arts Project, a collection of essays from writers who worked with the program to document InsideOut's history and celebrate the organization's 20th anniversary. Blackhawk retired as executive director of InsideOut in 2015. Suma Karaman Rosen was selected as the organization's next executive director and began her tenure in January 2017.

=== Current operations ===
In 2020 InsideOut introduced "InsideOut At Home," a collection of free, online creative writing lessons.

InsideOut receives funding to support its operations from donors and a number of local and national organizations including the National Endowment for the Arts, the Michigan Council for the Arts and Cultural Affairs, and Detroit Arts Support. InsideOut also receives support from local businesses and corporate sponsorships.

InsideOut's offices are located in Prentis Hall on Wayne State University's campus.

== Programs ==
InsideOut's programs use creative writing and poetry to encourage self-expression and build the literary and academic skills of K-12 students in the Detroit area. Students in InsideOut programs have also participated in regional and national performances and competitions as a part of a poetry slam team.

=== Writers-in-residence program ===
InsideOut's writers-in-residence program places professional writers in K–12 classrooms throughout the Detroit area to lead "poetry, spoken word and other multi-media arts experiences" for students. Writers teach weekly workshops throughout the school year using lessons created in alignment with Michigan Department of Education curriculum standards and Social-Emotional Learning approaches.

At the end of the academic year, InsideOut designs and publishes an anthology of student work for each school, which students get to keep. Students in the Writers-in-Residence program have had the opportunity to attend a Youth Writers Conference which includes workshops with professional writers.

The writers-in-residence program is primarily implemented in schools in the Detroit Public Schools Community District (DPSCD). Other school districts served include Dearborn, Highland Park, Oak Park, South Redford, and River Rouge. In 2020, DPSCD announced an arts and music plan expanding InsideOut's programs in middle schools.

=== Afterschool program ===
Citywide Poets is an after-school program for teens. The program consists of weekly workshops that focus on developing writing and poetry performance skills through mentorship and community. Workshops are held at multiple sites around Detroit including after school at Detroit high schools and at public locations such as the Detroit Public Library, which are free and open to all metro Detroit students. Citywide Poets began offering virtual workshop sites and live-streamed open mic performances in 2020.

Students in the Citywide Poets program have the opportunity to perform at local and regional events. Citywide Poets students have participated in slam poetry competitions such as Brave New Voices, an international youth slam poetry festival. In 2011, InsideOut's slam team placed fourth in the world.

=== Community events and collaborations ===
InsideOut collaborates with a number of cultural institutions and local organizations to host programs, performance opportunities, and other community events. InsideOut students and Writers-in-Residence have collaborated with the Detroit Institute of Arts on multiple exhibits and events including the "30 Americans" exhibit, "Black Is Beautiful: The Photography of Kwame Brathwaite" exhibit, and a Citywide Poets Showcase at the institute. InsideOut has also developed programs for students in collaboration with the Detroit Symphony Orchestra and Detroit Zoological Society.

==== University of Michigan partnership ====
In 2005 InsideOut partnered with the University of Michigan's Helen Zell Writers' MFA program to establish the Civitas Fellowship program. Students selected for Civitas fellowships are placed in classrooms across Detroit to serve as Writers-in-Residence with InsideOut's in-school program or its afterschool Citywide Poets program.

==== Local performances and poetry ====
InsideOut students have performed at multiple events and local venues including Wayne State University's Rev. Dr. Martin Luther King, Jr. Tribute, Detroit's Annual Concert of Colors, Detroit's Sidewalk Festival, and Eastern Market's Murals in the Market. InsideOut also collaborated with Bally Sports Detroit (previously Fox Sports 2) to record poetry performances shown on opening day for the Detroit Tigers and Detroit Pistons. InsideOut students' poems have also been published in local newspapers.

== Impact ==
In 2005 InsideOut conducted its first annual evaluation of program impacts, measuring the change in students' "writing skills, college readiness, confidence, self-esteem, and positive attitude toward reading and writing. Program evaluations of students and teachers and achievement test scores continue to show that InsideOut's programs improve students' critical thinking and writing skills.

Students in InsideOut's programs have said that participating has helped them feel empowered and more confident in sharing their voice and ideas with others.

== Awards and recognition ==
- Michigan Community Arts Award from Michigan Association of Community Arts Agencies, 1999
- Blackhawk receives Michigan Governor's Award for Arts Education, 2000
- Humanities Award from Wayne County Commission for Arts, History and Humanities, 2007
- National Arts and Humanities Youth Program Award (The "Coming Up Taller" Award) by First Lady Michelle Obama at the White House, 2009
- InsideOut's slam team placed fourth in the Brave New Voices National Youth Poetry Slam held in San Francisco, 2011
- InsideOut is featured in HuffPost's 2011 Detroit Impact series, 2011
- InsideOut is featured in PBS NewsHour series "Where Poetry Lives" with U.S. Poet Laureate Natasha Trethewey, 2013
- Detroit Free Press publishes student poems from Citywide Poets' "Building Homes" anthology, 2016
- Fox Sports 2 (Now Bally Sports Detroit) shows InsideOut poetry performances on Detroit Tigers and Pistons opening day, 2019
- Local 4 WDIV publishes InsideOut student poems for Black History Month, 2021

== Notable alumni (students) ==
- Big Sean (Sean Anderson), American rapper
- Hajjar Baban, Paul and Daisy Soros Fellow
- Jemele Hill, American sports journalist
- Michael R. Jackson, American playwright, composer, and lyricist

== Notable writers-in-residence ==
- Edoheart (Eseohe Arhebamen), poet, dancer, singer, musician, producer, performance artist and visual artist
- Vievee Francis, American poet and associate professor of English and Creative Writing at Dartmouth College
- francine j. harris, American poet
- Mahogany Jones, American inspirational female rapper, singer, songwriter, community activist, and arts educator
- Jamaal May, American poet
- Chigozie Obioma, Nigerian writer
- Harvey Ovshinsky, American writer, story consultant, media producer, and teacher
- Danez Smith, African-American, poet, writer and performer
