= Gunslinger's Revenge =

1998 film

- Italian: Il mio West
- Directed by: Giovanni Veronesi
- Written by: Vincenzo Pardini (novel); Giovanni Veronesi; Leonardo Pieraccioni
- Starring: Leonardo Pieraccioni; Harvey Keitel; David Bowie; Sandrine Holt
- Music by: Pino Donaggio
- Distributed by: Cecchi Gori distribuzione (Italy)
- Release date: 18 December 1998 (Italy)
- Running time: 95 minutes (Italy); 87 minutes (U.S.)
- Country: Italy
- Language: Italian
- Box office: $6.7 million (Italy)

Gunslinger's Revenge (Italian: Il mio West, lit. 'My West') is a 1998 Italian Western directed by Giovanni Veronesi and starring Leonardo Pieraccioni, Harvey Keitel and David Bowie. The screenplay was written by Veronesi and Pieraccioni, based on the novel by Vincenzo Pardini.

== Plot ==
The story begins in 1860 in Basin Field, a small (fictional) village on the slopes of the great mountains that border Canada in the "Far West." The film depicts the idealistic lifestyle of an old West farmer, his Indian wife and half-breed son, who narrates the tale. The main characters are "Doc", the village doctor, his Indian wife Pearl and their son Jeremiah.

Their idyllic life is disrupted when Doc's father Johnny Lowen, an old gunslinger, suddenly shows up on the farm. Johnny says he has returned home to find rest and to finally retire. The family is not happy with his return, given his past lifestyle and mistreatment of his family.

After his arrival in the village, Jack Sikora, a killer who has been chasing Johnny for years, and his two henchmen hear he has returned. Jack is determined to kill Johnny, and does everything in his power to force his rival to accept a duel to the death. Mary, the Saloon madam tries to kill Sikora, but is killed in the process. Given Jonny's reluctance to accept a duel, Jack kidnaps Doc's son Jeremiah. Johnny accepts the duel in order to save Jeremiah, but ultimately the village idiot manages to kill Jack by an accidental fire.

== Cast ==
- Leonardo Pieraccioni as Doc Lowen
- Harvey Keitel as Johnny Lowen
- David Bowie as Jack Sikora
- Sandrine Holt as Pearl
- Alessia Marcuzzi as Mary
- Jim van der Woude as Joshua
- Yudii Mercedi as Jeremiah
- Michelle Gomez as Leather girl
- Rosalind Knight as Mrs. Willow
- Jimmy Herman as Indian Grandfather
- Wilma Pelly as Indian Grandmother
- Lorenzo Wilde as lieutenant

== Box office ==
The film was one of the highest grossing films of the year in Italy with a gross of $6.7 million.
