= Al Sutton =

American documentary filmmaker (1933–2022)

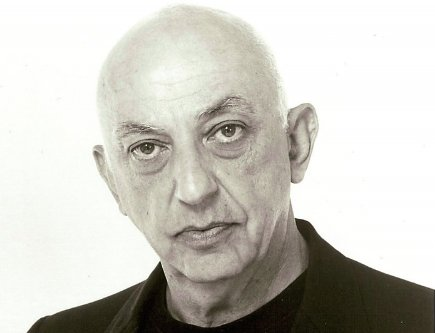
Al Sutton MD

Albert L. Sutton (December 7, 1933 – October 20, 2022) was an American pathologist. He retired from medicine in 1979 and became a real estate developer.

Sutton died on October 20, 2022, at the age of 88.
