= Alexander Zonjic =

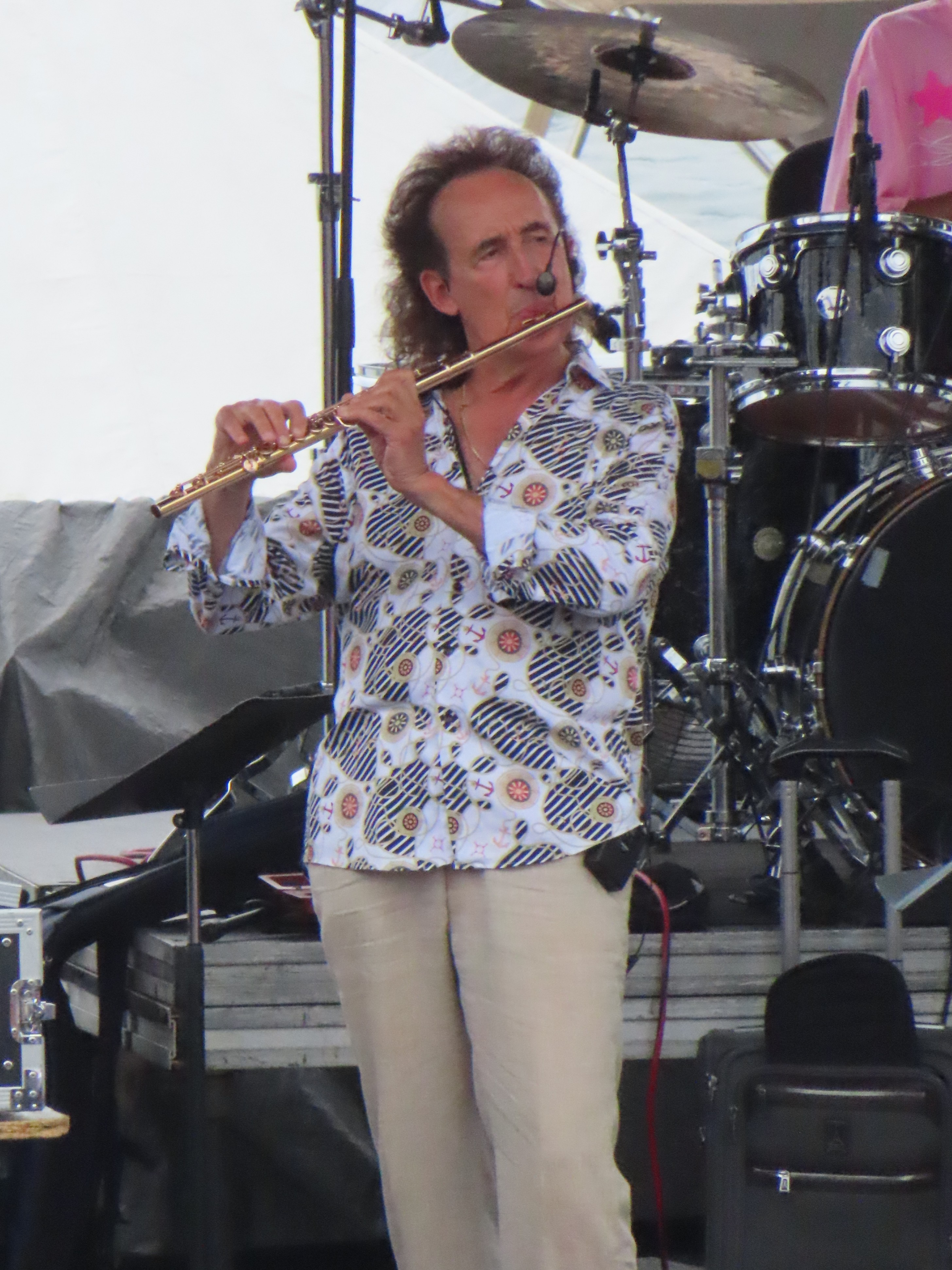
- Zonjic performing in 2026

Background information
- Born: April 30, 1951 (age 75); Windsor, Ontario, Canada
- Genres: Light jazz, classical
- Occupation: Flutist

Alexander Zonjic (Serbian Cyrillic: Александар Зоњић; born April 30, 1951) is a Canadian flutist and recording artist who performs both light jazz and classical compositions.

== Biography ==
He is the son of a Greek mother and a Serbian émigré father who left the war-torn Yugoslavia before Tito's communists took over. He was educated in Windsor, Ontario where he graduated from University of Windsor in 1975 and continued studying with Ervin Monroe, a distinguished first flutist with the Detroit Symphony Orchestra.

Throughout the 1980s, continuing to live in Windsor with his wife, Lorraine, and son, Alex Jr., Zonjic performed regularly in Detroit-area clubs such as Baker's Keyboard Lounge, Alexanders, and Murdock's. He currently lives in Detroit, Michigan.

== Discography ==
- 1978: Alexander Zonjic
- 1981: The Classical Album
- 1987: When Is It Real?
- 1988: Romance With You (Optimism)
- 1988: Elegant Evening (Inner City, 1988)
- 1991: Neon (Reprise)
- 1993: Passion (Reprise, 1993)
- 1995: Pipers Holiday (Hi-Falutin Music)
- 2001: Reach for the Sky (Heads Up)
- 2004: Seldom Blues (Heads Up)
- 2009: Doin' the D (Heads Up International)
- 2020: Playing It Forward (Hi-Falutin)
