= The Muggs =

American rock band

The Muggs are an American band from Detroit, Michigan. It was formed in 2000 by guitarist Danny Methric and bassist Tony DeNardo.

== History ==
=== Early Years (2000–2004) ===
Danny Methric and Tony DeNardo got together and decided to form a more bluesy band than their previous bands had been. They found drummer Matt Rost who agreed to join the band. In October 2000, the band recorded their first EP demo to play to help get gigs. In March 2001, they were invited to play the Hamtramck Blowout, a music festival that involves hundreds of Detroit bands at nearly twenty different bars in Hamtramk City in Detroit, and continued playing more shows until September. In August 2001 they played the last Gold Dollar show ever and Cadieux Café's "Mussel Beach Music Festival." September 2 was their last show before Tony suffered from a hemorrhagic stroke that nearly ended his life. He was completely paralyzed on his right side and unable to speak. DeNardo survived his stroke but was in bad shape.

The other members decided to not replace him. Instead, they became involved with several other groups until Tony recovered. These bands and projects included Over Under Sideways Down, The Kingsnakes, The Go, and The Paybacks. After three fundraisers for DeNardo, he was able to go to Southern California for some medical treatment that he hoped would speed his recovery. Tony decided to try his bass lines on a Rhodes keyboard bass after a suggestion from the Muggs' old friend Matt Smith, from the band Outrageous Cherry. They returned to rock together after DeNardo had rehabbed for 2 long years, and then were signed with metro Detroit indie label, Times Beach Records, in the spring of 2004.

=== The Muggs (2005–2007) ===
They released their self-titled album on July 19, 2005, after having their songs on the documentary rockumentary. During a tour in Spain they were voted the Best Blues Artist/Group for 2007 in the Feb 28th, 2007 issue of Real Detroit Weekly. In August 2007, the band was selected to audition for the Fox TV show, The Next Great American Band and made it to the Top 12 out of 10,000+ applicants. The band appeared on The Next Great American Band for four episodes and got to play two originals for the entire nation to see: "Should've Learned My Lesson" from their first CD, and "Slow Curve" from their not then yet released yet second full length album, On With The Show.

In February 2008, they won "Best Rock Band of 2007" and, at the 2008 Detroit Music Awards, won "Outstanding Rock Artist/Group" award. Danny Methric won the "Outstanding Rock/Pop Instrumentalist" award as a guitarist.

=== On With the Show (2008–2009) ===
On May 9, 2008, the band released On With the Show, their second CD. The album received an 8/10 article from Classic Rock Magazine. The band then opened for a variety of rock bands including Mountain, Robin Trower, Cactus, Savoy Brown, Ten Years After, Glenn Hughes of Deep Purple/Black Sabbath, Johnny Lang, Candlebox, North Mississippi Allstars, the Verve Pipe, Electric Six, and the Detroit Cobras. In October 2009, Matt Rost stepped down as drummer of The Muggs. Todd Glass, one of the most sought after drummers in Detroit replaced Rost.

=== Born Ugly and Full Tilt (2010–present) ===
In late 2010, the band, now with Glass on drums, entered the studio to begin recording their third CD, entitled Born Ugly. The official release date was April 29, 2011. The band also recorded a live show at Cadieux Cafe in Detroit in late October 2012, which they released on April 26, 2013 entitled Full Tilt: Live At Cadieux Cafe At the 2013 Detroit Music Awards, the Muggs won once again for 'Outstanding Rock Artist/Group' & 'Outstanding Rock/Pop Instrumentalist' for the Fender Rhodes bassist, Tonymuggs. They now have 4 tours of Europe under their belts as well as being on a host of internet stations including Pandora and Spotify. They are also on all AMI/Rowe internet jukeboxes across the U.S.

== Discography ==
- Slave to Sound - Volume 5 (January 3, 2020)
- Straight up Boogaloo (March 16, 2015)
- Full Tilt: Live at Cadieux Cafe 2 CD (April 26, 2013)
- Born Ugly (April 29, 2011)
- Bite Of The Weredog Single (October 25, 2008)
- On With the Show (May 9, 2008)
- The Muggs (July 19, 2005)
