= Liz Larin =

American singer-songwriter

Mary Elizabeth "Liz" Larin is an American musician, composer and record producer. Born in Detroit, Michigan, United States, Larin is also the founder of Bona Dea Music, an independent record label focused on electronic pop/rock, world and ambient music; and Digital Opts & Sound Design and ACM Creative Digital, digital media companies specializing in music production, film scoring, sound art installations, video production, web development and interactive publishing.

== Background and career ==
A self-taught guitarist and pianist at age ten, at 15 Larin was asked to teach guitar at a local music store. In the store she came in contact with musicians playing many styles, including R&B and jazz, and was soon playing jam sessions across the city. When she announced that she was going to join a rock band, and make a living as a musician, her parents objected. Larin left home at age 16, supporting herself by teaching guitar and playing gigs in and around Detroit.

After leaving home, Larin found her way to Los Angeles, where along with guitarist and songwriter Michael King, she formed the group, Press. The band changed its name to Rebel Heels and signed with Atlantic Records in 1987. Rebel Heels folded after only one album but Atlantic Records retained Larin as a solo artist. Her debut solo album, Test Your Faith, was released in 1993, and re-released in Europe in 2014.

Later, she returned to Detroit and went indie and formed her own record label, Bona Dea Music (cf. Bona Dea, a figure from Roman mythology). Merry Wicked, her first independent album, was released in 1999. That album was followed by The Story of O-Miz in 2002 and Wake Up, Start Dreaming in 2006. The albums highlighted the musical skills of Robert Tye on guitar, James Simonson and Chuck Bartels on bass guitar, and Todd Glass and Dave Taylor on drums. Vinnie Dombroski of Sponge lent drums and vocals to the track "Pretty Is." The Story of O-Miz picked up the Outstanding CD of the Year Award at the Detroit Music Awards in 2005. The self-produced Hurricane CD was released in 2014, featuring Larin's skills as a producer and multi-instrumentalist.

Taking a more electronic music approach, in 2018 Larin released two projects starting with electro-pop EP Good Human performed with samplers, keyboards, and electric guitar, creating vocal and sound loops, while remixing the music live in real time.

Also, a 2018 release of instrumental music designed for meditation, Chakra Hymns - The Arcello Series moves the listener through the chakra centers with ambient music to support yoga practice and relaxation. 2021 saw the release of Arcello Focus- Magia and Hope Bridge - Ascending featuring Darlene Drew from the Lion King on world flutes.

Currently, Larin composes music for film and television splitting her time between Detroit, Montreal and New Orleans, continuing to release music under Liz Larin, Stella 13, LusterKraft, Arcello Focus and Hope Bridge.

== Awards and critical commentary ==
She has won multiple Detroit Music Awards. Her 2021 work "The Expedition" received the Outstanding Electronic/Dance Recording award.

== Discography ==
- One By One By One (with Rebel Heels), 1988, Atlantic Records. With Michael King- guitar, Danny Cox - drums. Produced by Rupert Hine.
- Test Your Faith, 1993, Atlantic Records. Produced by Liz Larin and Ben Grosse.
- Merry Wicked, 1999, Bona Dea Music. Produced by Liz Larin and Scott Spock.
- The Story of O-Miz, 2002, Bona Dea Music.
- Wake Up, Start Dreaming, 2005, Bona Dea Music.
- Stella 13 - When Soul Becomes Symphony, 2009, Bona Dea Music.
- Blue Circus Life, 2009, Bona Dea Music.
- Luster Kraft - The Transmitter, 2009, Bona Dea Music.
- Hurricane, 2014, Bona Dea Music.
- Good Human - Stella 13, 2018, Bona Dea Music.
- Chakra Hymns - Arcello Series - Music for Meditation, 2018, Bona Dea Music.
- Arcello Focus - Magia, 2021, Bona Dea Music.
- Hope Bridge - Ascending, 2021, Bona Dea Music.
- Liz Larin - 'The Expedition, 2021, Bona Dea Music.
