= Sarana VerLin =

American singer-songwriter (born 1953)

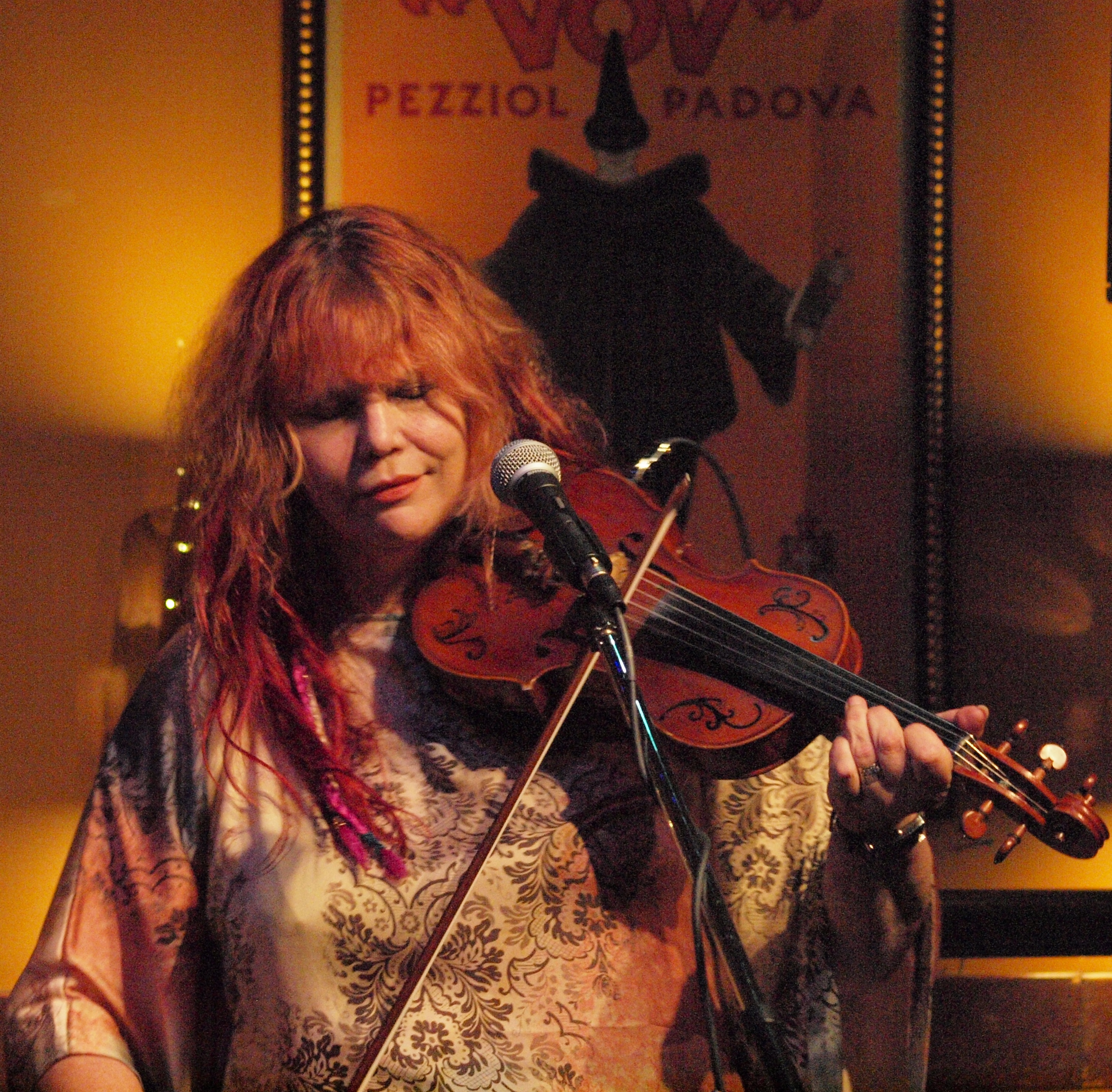

Background information
- Born: September 19, 1953 (age 72)
- Genres: Celticana – a blend of rock, pop, folk, Celtic and Americana
- Instruments: violin, guitar, keyboards
- Years active: 1977–present
- Label: Drum Dancer Records
- Formerly of: Natasha, Dark Carnival
- Website: www.saranaverlin.com

Sarana VerLin (born September 19, 1953) is an American violinist, singer-songwriter and multi-instrumentalist. She was the vocalist/violinist of the bands Natasha and Dark Carnival, and violinist for numerous bands.

== Biography ==
VerLin was classically trained on violin starting at age 10 and performed in The International Youth Symphony which was founded by Windsor Symphony Orchestra conductor Matti Holli. After high school, she played guitar and rock violin with other musicians for many years.

In 1979, after a feature article about women in rock appeared in the Detroit News, she decided to front her own band called Natasha which won an award for Best New Talent. They were active until 1985 and during that time she also worked on projects with Grammy Award winner Don Was, Grammy Award winner Eminem producer Steve King and Marilyn Manson/Debbie Harry producer Ben Grosse. They toured extensively throughout the midwest and Canada.

She is in the Detroit Metro Times Hall of Fame (alongside Patti Smith, Iggy Pop and Aretha Franklin) after winning best instrumentalist 3 years running for the Detroit Metro Times Music Awards (a.k.a. the Detroit Music Awards). She has been featured in numerous articles in the Detroit Free Press, Goldmine, Trouser Press, Metro Times, and the Detroit News as well as television and radio appearances.

Sarana was one of the original members of the supergroup Dark Carnival, which was a rotating group of superstars from the Detroit Area...most notably Niagara, Ron Asheton, Scott Asheton, Cheetah Chrome of the Dead Boys and poet Jim Carroll.

In 2004, she switched her talents from rock to Celtic, performing at midwestern renaissance and pirate festivals such as the Michigan Renaissance Festival for the next 4 years. Her most well known and popular song written during that time is St. Brendan's Reel.

After reappearing on the Detroit music circuit in 2009, she won Detroit Music Awards Outstanding Instrumentalist in the Acoustic category. In 2010 she won Detroit Music Awards Outstanding Folk Act as a duo with Billy Brandt and received several other nominations in various categories. Her music has been heard worldwide from Australia to Japan and her song "Knock On Wood" was featured on Taxi Talk video in 2010. VerLin's recording of 'Kyrie' was featured in a 2012 Haiti Rescue film soundtrack for Maryland's Fire and Rescue team.

She appeared in two films which were shot in Michigan. She is credited with playing the part of a renaissance fiddler in All's Faire in Love and also appeared in Gifted Hands: The Ben Carson Story where she was a journalist photographer. A voting member of the Grammy Awards, she currently splits her time between Detroit and Stroud when not touring.

== Style of music ==
Sarana VerLin's primary musical instruments are the violin, the guitar and the baritone violin. Her current style blends the roots of Celtic, Folk and Americana.

== Festivals/Touring ==
VerLin has toured extensively throughout the Detroit/Ann Arbor area as well as touring Michigan, Florida, Canada, Chicago, New York City, Boston, Cleveland, Toledo, Ohio, and England. In 2009, she performed solo and with various musicians during the summer tour, performing at Metro Times Blowout, Hamtramck Blowout, Scarab Club Musings Series, Dunegrass, and Michigan Earth Day Festival as well as individual venues.

In May 2010, she toured for 2 weeks around Exeter with music partner Billy Brandt. Arriving back in the US in June to begin the heavy summer touring season, she performed solo, as a duo with Billy Brandt, or with full band lineup (Brandt on guitar/mandolin/vocals, John Holk on bass/vocals, Drew Howard on dobro/mandolin, Chris Degnore on guitar, and Todd Glass on drums.)

In 2011, VerLin returned to England with Billy Brandt and added Stroud, Crediton and Exmouth to Exeter May dates. From June through September, the Michigan tour included festivals such as Ann Arbor Summer Festival, Concert of Colors with Don Was's All-Star Review, Arts, Beats and Eats, Assembly Line Concert behind the Michigan Governor, Thumbfest, Detroit River Days Festival, Crossroads Music Festival, Bluewater Festival and concerts at Chelsea Sights & Sounds, Black Cat Concert Series, Stone Arch Concert Series, Trinity House Concerts, and Stonehouse Concerts.

Since her November 2011 move to the UK she continued to tour 3–4 weeks in the US and 3–4 weeks in the UK and Europe with Billy Brandt. She performed at festivals (including Bristol Folk Festival, Priddy Folk Festival, Watchet Music Festival, Stroud Fringe Festival) and venues throughout the UK either as a solo artist, with Detroit music partner Billy Brandt, or with UK music group Iron & Oak. She organized the Stroud Americana Festival, a 3-day festival in her then hometown of Stroud during the first weekend in June, which was so popular it ran for a second year.

== Awards ==
- 1985 VerLin's band Natasha won Detroit Metro Times Music Awards Best New Talent.
- 2000 listed in the Detroit Metro Times Hall of Fame alongside Aretha Franklin and Iggy Pop after winning Best Instrumentalist for 3 consecutive years.
- 2009 VerLin won the Acoustic/Folk Instrumentalist award at the Detroit Music Awards with 2 other nominations.
- 2010 VerLin along with music partner Billy Brandt won the Folk Artist/Act award at the Detroit Music Awards with 4 nominations in different categories. Her song "Gravity Down" won the Black Crystal Songwriting Challenge.
- 2011 VerLin won Acoustic/Folk Instrumentalist and Acoustic/Folk Album awards at the Detroit Music Awards with a total of 11 nominations in several categories.
- 2012 VerLin won Classical Recording, World Recording and Acoustic/Folk Recording (with Billy Brandt) at the Detroit Music Awards.
- 2013 Goin' Home CD nominated Acoustic/Folk Recording at the Detroit Music Awards.
- 2014 Brandt & VerLin nominated Folk Artist at the Detroit Music Awards.
- 2017 VerLin nominated Classical Instrumentalist at the Detroit Music Awards.
- 2017 Finalist in the International UK Songwriting Contest for the song Detour in the Country category.
- 2019 VerLin & Brandt Are You Listening? CD nominated Americana Recording at the Detroit Music Awards.

== Discography ==
1. Slip of The Lip/Crocodile (1981)
2. Mandatory Music Tremor Records Compilation (1982)
3. WLLZ Motor City Rocks Compilation (1983)
4. WLLZ Motor City Rocks II Compilation (1984)
5. Unity Gain Compilation (1985)
6. GutterPups (2004)
7. GutterPups – Live on the Street of Red Lanterns (2005)
8. Amadon Crest – Live (2007)
9. Sarana VerLin – Half (2009)
10. Billy Brandt & Sarana VerLin – Live From Billy's Basement (2010)
11. "New Atlantic Sound Volume 1 (UK)" (2010)
12. Rock N Reel Magazine Compilation (UK) (2010)
13. Carnival Girl – Live and Otherwise (2010)
14. US/UK Compilation – Distant Thunder (2010)
15. Sarana VerLin – Bats & Butterflies (2010)
16. Wilderspin – Something to Crow About (2012)
17. Sarana VerLin & Billy Brandt – Goin' Home (2013)
18. Iron & Oak – Detour (2017)
19. Sarana VerLin & Billy Brandt – Are You Listening? (2018)
