= Bobby East (musician) =

Zambian rapper and businessman

- Born: Robert Chunga; 2 March 1990 (age 36); Lusaka, Zambia
- Other names: Day Walker, Vanilla Rob
- Occupations: Musician; Songwriter; Business man
- Children: 1
- Musical career
- Genres: Hip hop; R&B
- Instrument: keyboard
- Years active: 2010–present
- Label: XYZ Entertainments

Robert Chunga better known by his stage name, Bobby East, is a Zambian rapper, singer and business man.

== Career ==
In 2010, Bobby East recorded his first song. It swiftly became a hit and he eventually rose to fame. He is currently signed to Slap Dee's record label, XYZ. In 2016, Bobby was elected as the label's CEO.

== Discography ==
=== Studio albums ===
List of studio albums with selected details
Title	Details
B.East	Released: 2015; Formats: CD
Vanilla	Released: 2018; Formats: CD • Digital download
Rob•Art	Released: 2024; Formats: CD • Digital download

=== Singles ===
Title	Year	Album
"Hate Mail"		
"Do or Die" (feat. Petersen)		
"For A Long Time" (feat. Slapdee)		
"Van-Damme" (feat. Nez Long)		
"Toxic" (feat. Kantu)		
"I Declare" (feat. Macky 2)		
"Hate Mail 2"	2022	
"Ma Reason" (feat. Vinchezo)	2022	

== Awards and nominations ==
Year	Award	Category	Result
2018	Kwacha Music Awards	Best artist (Lusaka Province)	Won
2018	Kwacha Music Awards	Best Hip-hop song	Won
2018	Kwacha Music Awards	Best collaboration	Won
2018	Kwacha Music Awards	Song of the year	Won
