= Mahogany Jones =

American rapper (born 1978)

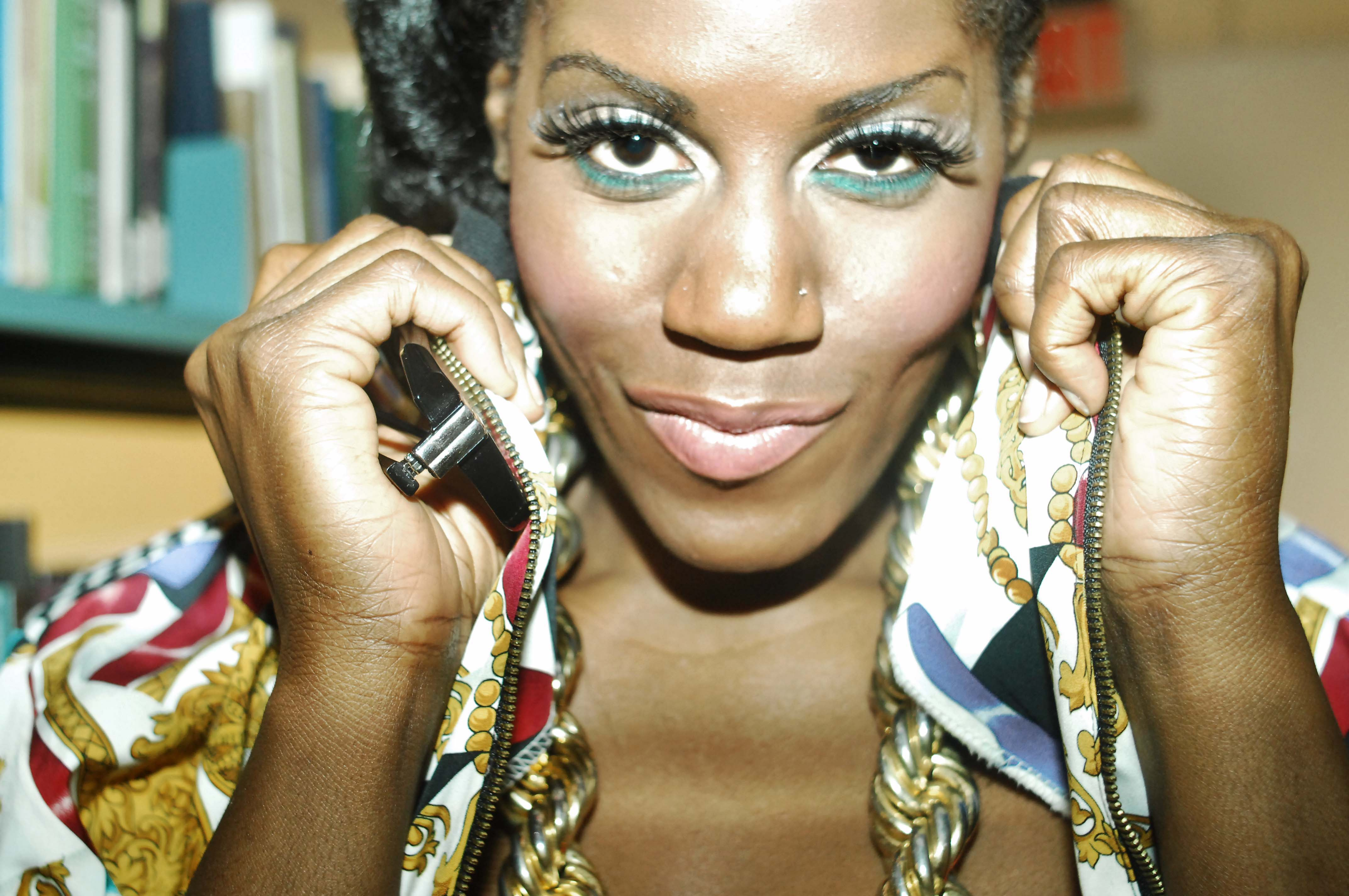
- Portrait of Mahogany Jones

Background information
- Born: Charyse Lois Marshall (Bailey); Mt. Vernon, New York, United States
- Origin: Detroit, Michigan, United States
- Genres: Hip hop, conscious hip hop, soul, gospel, inspirational music
- Occupations: Musician, rapper, poet, songwriter, cultural ambassador, arts educator
- Years active: 2001–present
- Website: mahoganyjones.com

Charyse Lois Marshall (born August 8, 1978), better known by the stage name Mahogany Jones, is an American inspirational female rapper, singer, songwriter, community activist, and arts educator with InsideOut Literary Arts. Born in Mt. Vernon, New York, United States, she later moved to California as a child, then back to New York City before deciding to permanently reside in Detroit, Michigan in 2004. She is most noted for her appearance on BET's 106 & Park Freestyle Fridays as the first four-time undefeated champion in 2001. She is also known around the world as a Hip-hop Ambassador having served as a cultural ambassador with American Music Abroad and other programs under the United States Department of State Bureau of Educational and Cultural Affairs in 2012 and 2013.

== Freestyle Friday ==
The test of her skills as an emcee and her rise to notoriety came when Toni Blackman suggested that Mahogany Jones compete in a rap battle on the cable network BET's program 106 & Park in a new segment known as Freestyle Friday. Prior to Jones, there had been no female rappers that managed to compete without losing. Feeling the pressure, Mahogany made a bargain with God before appearing on the show to use her new emcee skills to glorify him if he allowed her to win. To everyone's amazement, but her own, she won her battle, not once, but four times in a row. However, to uphold her promise to God, Jones stepped away from the competition leaving the show as the only four time undefeated champion and first undefeated female champion.

== Music ambassador ==
January 2012, at the behest of her mentor, Toni Blackman, Mahogany Jones applied for American Music Abroad, a cultural diplomacy program built on the legacy of the Jazz Ambassadors program and facilitated by American Voices on behalf of the U.S. State Department. Jones assembled a four-person ensemble called Mahogany Jones- Live with Lauren "L Boog" Johnson on percussion, Rosalyn Welch as background vocalist, DJ Sean Blu, who is a Pepsi DJ, and herself as the headliner and main vocalist. The group was one of 12 ensembles selected out of nearly 300 applicants to travel abroad and represent the nation. Mahogany Jones-Live performed in Washington, D.C. as part of their tour before flying to Africa to perform in Botswana, Uganda, Rwanda, Zambia, and Ethiopia. While there, Jones taught workshops with local artists, headlined the Amaka Arts Festival in Zambia, appeared on radio shows, performed for students as Livingstone-Kolobeng College and National University of Rwanda, as well as for dignitaries and Vice President of Zambia and his family.

In 2013, American Voices asked Jones to serve as a performer - instructor with their Y.E.S. Academy in Iraq, Jones taught hip-hop theater and emceeing classes alongside Broadway performer, Michael Parks and break dancer, Cricket. The academy was located in the Kurdistan region of Iraq, however Mahogany also performed at the U.S. Embassy in Baghdad, Iraq during the trip.

== Discography ==
=== Albums ===
- Morphed (2008)
- Pure, Vol. 1 (2014)
- Sugar Water (2016)
- Floating (2020)

=== Compilations ===
- Bridge Wars (Queensbridge Records) 2011
