= John Wick: Chapter 4 (soundtrack) =

2023 soundtrack album by Tyler Bates and Joel J. Richard

John Wick: Chapter 4 (Original Motion Picture Soundtrack)

Soundtrack album by Tyler Bates and Joel J. Richard
- Released: March 24, 2023
- Recorded: 2021–2023
- Genres: Rock; pop; electronic dance music; orchestral; punk; techno-pop; garage rock; grunge
- Length: 1:25:21
- Label: Lakeshore
- Producers: Tyler Bates; Joel J. Richard

Tyler Bates chronology
Pearl (2022)	John Wick: Chapter 4 (2023)	MaXXXine (2024)

Joel J. Richard chronology
Think Lovely Thoughts (2022)	John Wick: Chapter 4 (2023)	Ballerina (2025)

Singles from John Wick: Chapter 4 (Original Motion Picture Soundtrack)
- 1. "Eye For an Eye" Released: March 22, 2023

John Wick: Chapter 4 (Original Motion Picture Soundtrack) is the soundtrack to the 2023 film John Wick: Chapter 4, the fourth installment of the John Wick franchise starring Keanu Reeves as the titular character and a sequel to John Wick: Chapter 3 – Parabellum (2019). The soundtrack album features original music composed by Tyler Bates and Joel J. Richard and was released along with the film, on March 24, 2023, by Lakeshore Records. It was led by the single "Eye For an Eye", the film's main theme performed by Rina Sawayama (who also plays Akira in the film), released two days earlier.

== Development ==
=== Score ===
"The sound of John Wick was created by Joel Richard and me [Bates], starting with the first instalment of the franchise before it entered the pop culture zeitgeist. It's truly amazing that it has grown into what it has become since its inception. Joel and I are long-time friends and we share similar tastes in a vast amount of music so our JW collaboration is essentially a musical conversation. Once we familiarised ourselves with the martial arts culture in the context of what I consider to be a graphic novel-type film, we were encouraged by directors Chad Stahelski and David Leitch to experiment and bring the rock! For Joel and me that was a dream assignment. Again, we are experimenting with synthesizers and playing guitars. Super fun!"

— Bates, on the sonic nature of the John Wick franchise films, and the hybrid nature of the fourth film's music

Chapter 4 is scored by Tyler Bates and Joel J. Richard, the recurring composers of the John Wick franchise films, who began working on the film's score for nearly more than a year. Bates said that "Chad [Stahelski] has an insatiable appetite for turning stones and diving deeper into that world. It's really inspiring to see how deeply passionate to see the things that made him want to be in the movie business and to pursue martial arts, all those old kung fu movies [...] He knows how to put it on the screen to give the audience an experience where they can feel, on a granular level, what the fights are all about and the culture of it. That's really apparent in this film, and that aspect is great." He called John Wick 4 as the Mount Kilimanjaro of hybrid film scores.

Bates added that the main theme of John Wick was consistent throughout the four films, whereas he expanded the genres and cultures from the franchise film's score as it travels throughout the world, calling the score as an "infusion of cultures". Bates and Richards perform the guitar portions (both electric and acoustic), along with bass and synthesizers, with Gil Sharone playing drums. The score featured a 72-piece orchestra from Nashville, Tennessee, mostly strings and woodwinds, to maintain the rock aesthetic and expand it sonically and harmonically. It was Stahelski's idea to expand the soundscape into "a huge orchestral score". In an interview to Variety, Bates said:

"If you listen to the four scores, they've definitely grown as the scope of the films has. Not in the way that it's now an orchestra and it's larger; it's just that the color palette has continued to develop throughout, still maintaining the fun, hybrid-rock foundation to the score [...] When you're creating a score that has so many unusual synth textures and modular synth sounds, as well as varied guitar, bass and drum sounds, it's a lot of inventory to reconcile harmonically so that it all complements one another and at the same time serves the picture."

Comparing to the previous instalments, the film has nearly estimated three hours of recorded music. Another challenging aspect was to create music for multiple action sequences, as "It's looking for opportunities to hold back so that you can hit the throttle in the most important chapters of a fight. Sometimes we just ramp up, or have a lot of different beats in a sequence, so that we can slam where we really want to increase the intensity and the tempo."

=== Songs ===
The soundtrack featured four songs in the album. Bates' daughter Lola Collette, performed the cover of the Martha and the Vandellas' song "Nowhere to Run" (1965), that was pitched when they were on tour with Jerry Cantrell. He was asked to cover the classical songs in the John Wick style, hence, he insisted Collette to perform the track whom she heard of it and also Cantrell suggested her to sing as she did the same for one of the songs for his solo record Brighten. Collette did a demo version of the track, and when Chad Stahelski and Nathan Orloff supervised the final edit, assembling the collection of final versions of the songs, he showcased her version of the track "Nowhere to Run", which Stahelski liked it and recommended her to perform the final version. He said that "what you're hearing is pretty much a one-take, and it's pretty cool. It worked out well." The rhythm section is performed by Sam and Nick from the garage punk band White Reaper, along with backing vocals performed by Sophie Negrini. All in all, this formed an homage to 1979 film The Warriors, in which a female DJ plays the song in reference to the eponymous gang as they fight for their lives in New York City.

He further co-wrote and produced two songs for the soundtrack, which included "I Would Die for You" performed by Maria Brink and Chris Howorth from the American rock band In This Moment and "Eye for an Eye" sung by Japanese-British singer-songwriter Rina Sawayama. Upon producing the songs, Bates said "I went a little bit more garage-punk in the production of the songs on this movie because there's a lot more EDM-ish music incorporated into the film. I thought the punk aesthetic would be a little fresher sounding than the hard rock approach of the past films – a little more abrasive and a little more live."

== Track listing ==
All tracks are written by Tyler Bates and Joel J. Richard.

No.	Title	Artist(s)	Length
1.	"Big Wick Energy"		1:47
2.	"Nowhere to Run"	Lola Colette	2:53
3.	"Sand Wick"		2:29
4.	"Killing the Elder"		1:46
5.	"Hotel Condemned"		2:30
6.	"Wick in Osaka"		2:33
7.	"High Table in Osaka"		1:03
8.	"A Grave Accusation"		4:59
9.	"Grief on a Train"		1:57
10.	"I Would Die for You"	In This Moment	4:39
11.	"Of Mincing & Men"		1:09
12.	"A Grave Situation"		2:27
13.	"Ever Now"	Gesaffelstein	1:39
14.	"To Get Back In"		4:04
15.	"Killa's Teeth"		2:03
16.	"Ambition and Worth"		2:19
17.	"Dog Lover"		1:28
18.	"JW, Loving Husband"		1:18
19.	"Stairs Arrival"		1:39
20.	"Marie Douceur, Marie Colère (cover of 'Paint it Black' with French lyrics)"	Manon Hollander	2:47
21.	"John Wick Rises"		1:22
22.	"Paris Radio Intro"		1:37
23.	"Chess Club"		4:44
24.	"Urban Cowgirl"		2:17
25.	"Quite the Mess You've Made"		1:28
26.	"The Ex Ex"		2:41
27.	"The Ex Ex Chapter 3"		2:13
28.	"Arc De Triomphe"		1:03
29.	"Wrong Train"		1:43
30.	"Sacré-Coeur Sunrise"		1:01
31.	"Pistol Procession"		5:17
32.	"Ten Paces"		1:36
33.	"Twenty Paces"		2:41
34.	"Helen A Handbasket"		5:47
35.	"Eye For an Eye (Main Theme)"	Rina Sawayama	3:05
36.	"Cry Mia River"		0:56
Total length:			1:25:21

== Reception ==
JimmyO of JoBlo.com called the "atmospheric score" of Bates and Richard as "extraordinary". A review from The Prague Reporter called it as "a pulsating electronic score from composer Tyler Bates and writing partner Joel J. Richard keeps our blood flowing." Tom Jorgensen of IGN wrote "complimented by a punchy score from Tyler Bates and Joel J. Richard, which traces Chapter 4's movements from culture to culture and converses with the action in ways that alternatingly emphasize and undercut big moments to great effect."

== Himmel und Hölle ==
Himmel und Hölle (from John Wick: Chapter 4)

EP by Le Castle Vania
- Released: March 31, 2023
- Genre: Club music
- Length: 11:50
- Label: Lakeshore

Le Castle Vania, who contributed to the music of previous John Wick instalments, released an extended play titled Himmel und Hölle (named after the fictional Berlin club inspired by Berghain in the film). It featured four tracks performed in the club, and was released on March 31, 2023, by Lakeshore Records.

No.	Title	Length
1.	"Blood Code"	2:56
2.	"Wetwork"	3:01
3.	"A Long Way Down"	3:50
4.	"Osaka Phonk"	2:02
Total length:		11:50
