= Ballerina (soundtrack) =

Ballerina (Original Motion Picture Soundtrack)

Film score by Tyler Bates and Joel J. Richard
- Released: June 6, 2025
- Recorded: 2024–2025
- Genre: Film score
- Length: 63:22
- Label: Lakeshore
- Producers: Tyler Bates; Joel J. Richard

Tyler Bates chronology
MaXXXine (2024)	Ballerina (2025)	Fixed (2025)

Joel J. Richard chronology
John Wick: Chapter 4 (2023)	Ballerina (2025)

Singles from Ballerina (Original Motion Picture Soundtrack)
- 1. "The Emptiness Machine" Released: September 5, 2024; 2. "I Will Not Break" Released: February 21, 2025

Ballerina (Original Motion Picture Soundtrack) is the film score to the 2025 film Ballerina, the fifth installment in the John Wick franchise. The film score is composed by Tyler Bates and Joel J. Richard and released through Lakeshore Records on June 6, 2025.

== Background ==
By April 2023, Marco Beltrami and Anna Drubich were hired as the composers; Beltrami had previously worked with Wiseman on Underworld: Evolution (2006) and Live Free or Die Hard (2007). Later, in September 2024, the duo was replaced by regular franchise composers Tyler Bates and Joel J. Richard.

== Release ==
Halsey and Amy Lee, the lead vocalist of the rock band Evanescence, collaborated for the promotional single "Hand That Feeds". The song was released on May 9, 2025, and topped the Billboard Hot Rock & Alternative Songs chart, prior to the film's release. The band also performed another promotional single "Fight Like a Girl" featuring K.Flay and released on June 6. It was used in the end credits.

The album contains 25 cues with the exception of final track "Become the Assassin" by Le Castle Vania. It was released through Lakeshore Records day-and-date with the film on June 6, 2025. Vania also released an extended play titled Ballerina Code featuring three tracks—"Minus Eleven", "Ballerina Code" and "One Bullet Well Placed".

== Reception ==
David Rooney of The Hollywood Reporter noted that the duo's "pulse-pounding synth score" deftly integrated with the "thumping techno music". Amy Nicholson of Los Angeles Times wrote "Tyler Bates and Joel J. Richard's percussive score pairs well with a soundscape of shattering glass". Siddhant Adlakha of Mashable called the music "Tchaikovsky- and Vivaldi-influenced".

== Track listing ==
No.	Title	Artist	Length
1.	"So Much Like Your Sister"		2:09
2.	"Daddy Fearless"		3:09
3.	"Chancellor"		2:59
4.	"Annie's Got a Gun"		1:50
5.	"Pappa Don't Breathe"		1:40
6.	"Winston's Offer"		1:53
7.	"Kiki Mora"		3:40
8.	"You in Ten F**king Years"		3:20
9.	"Wick'd Ticket"		3:12
10.	"Inking Eve"		1:50
11.	"Deal in Blood"		2:28
12.	"Info on Pine"		3:46
13.	"Eve Checks In"		1:35
14.	"Pine Contract"		2:20
15.	"Pine Gives Coordinates"		2:02
16.	"Eve to Hallstatt"		2:14
17.	"Order To Throw"		2:02
18.	"The Town Eye"		1:26
19.	"Great Hallstatt Bake Off"		0:55
20.	"Fate Is Humbling"		3:15
21.	"Agreement Between Tribes"		2:25
22.	"In the Wick of Time"		4:11
23.	"More Rules and Consequences"		2:07
24.	"Ice Rage Eve"		1:49
25.	"Daddy Not Walking Dead"		1:32
26.	"Become The Assassin"	Le Castle Vania	3:20
Total length:			63:22

== Additional music ==
Commercial songs from the film, but not on the soundtrack

- "The Four Seasons: Summer 3 (Robot Koch Remix)" by Max Richter
- "Grand Allegro" by Søren Bebe
- "Minus Eleven" by Le Castle Vania
- "Ballerina Code" by Le Castle Vania
- "One Bullet Well Placed" by Le Castle Vania
- "Chokehold Cherry Python" by Ashnikko
- "So What Now" by The Peter Blair Combo
- "The Four Seasons: L'estate (Summer)" by Australian Chamber Orchestra
- "Swan Lake" by Pyotr Ilyich Tchaikovsky
- "The Emptiness Machine" by Linkin Park

== Personnel credits ==
Credits adapted from liner notes:

- Music by: Tyler Bates and Joel J. Richard
- Supervising music editor: Ben Zales
- Assistant music editor: Brendan Leong
- Additional music by: Dylan Eiland, Brian Cachia
- Score produced and mixed by: Joel J. Richard
- Score coordinator: Matías Ambrogi-Torres
- Music clearance and licensing: Matt Lilley and Ann-Marie Verdi / MCL Music Services, Inc.
- Additional music services: Cutting Edge
