= Ballerina (2025 film) =

Film by Len Wiseman

- Theatrical release poster
- Directed by: Len Wiseman (Note: Chad Stahelski is uncredited as the director of reshoots, having overseen major additions to the movie without Wiseman's involvement.)
- Written by: Shay Hatten (Note: Rebecca Angelo, Lauren Schuker Blum, Emerald Fennell, Michael Finch and Len Wiseman are credited by the Writers Guild of America West with "additional literary material (not on-screen)".)
- Based on: Characters by Derek Kolstad
- Produced by: Basil Iwanyk; Erica Lee; Chad Stahelski
- Starring: Ana de Armas; Anjelica Huston; Gabriel Byrne; Lance Reddick; Norman Reedus; Ian McShane; Keanu Reeves
- Cinematography: Romain Lacourbas
- Edited by: Nicholas Lundgren; Jason Ballantine
- Music by: Tyler Bates; Joel J. Richard
- Production companies: Summit Entertainment; Thunder Road Films; 87Eleven Entertainment
- Distributed by: Lionsgate
- Release date: June 6, 2025
- Running time: 125 minutes
- Country: United States
- Language: English
- Budget: $90 million
- Box office: $140.2 million

Ballerina (Note: Also marketed as From the World of John Wick: Ballerina) is a 2025 American action thriller film directed by Len Wiseman and written by Shay Hatten. It is a spin-off installment within the John Wick film series, taking place between the events of John Wick: Chapter 3 – Parabellum (2019) and Chapter 4 (2023). It stars Ana de Armas as ballerina and assassin Eve MaCarro, who takes on an army of killers as she avenges the death of her father. The supporting cast includes Anjelica Huston, Lance Reddick (in his final screen appearance), Ian McShane, and Keanu Reeves reprising their roles from previous films, with Gabriel Byrne and Norman Reedus appearing in new roles.

Development on a fifth John Wick film began in 2017, after Hatten, who also contributed to the third and fourth films, wrote a spec script intended for a spin-off. Wiseman was appointed director in October 2019, with Chad Stahelski, the franchise's regular director, returning as a producer. Casting for Ballerina began in April 2022 and was rounded out by that December, with de Armas, Byrne and Reedus joining the cast and Huston, Reddick, McShane and Reeves returning. Composer and John Wick regular Tyler Bates along with Joel J. Richard also returned to score Ballerina. Principal photography began in November 2022 and lasted until January 2023, mainly in Prague and Budapest. Reshoots followed in February 2024.

Ballerina was theatrically released in the United States by Lionsgate on June 6, 2025, a year after it was originally scheduled to. The film received generally positive reviews from critics and grossed $140.2 million worldwide on a $90 million production budget.

== Plot ==
Eve Macarro is the daughter of assassins Javier of the Ruska Roma crime syndicate and his Cultist wife. As a child, Eve was taken away from the Cult by Javier, which led to the death of her mother. To retrieve Eve, the Cult and its Chancellor raid their home; Javier dies as he helps Eve escape. New York Continental manager Winston Scott brings Eve to the Ruska Roma, an assassins society under the cover of performance dancers, where she meets their Director and agrees to enlist.

Over the next 12 years, Eve trains as a ballerina, assassin, and bodyguard. She briefly meets John Wick during his visit with the Director, (Note: As depicted in John Wick: Chapter 3 – Parabellum (2019)) and he hints at an escape from the cycle. However, Eve completes her training by killing a former Ruska Roma member and earns the title of "Kikimora". During her first mission, Eve successfully protects her first ward, Katla Park.

While on a mission two months later, Eve is attacked by and kills a Cultist, who bears the same mark as those that murdered her father. Seeking revenge, she asks the Director about the Cult but is forbidden from pursuing them due to a longstanding truce between the Cult and the Ruska Roma.

Eve disobeys the Director and visits the New York Continental to meet Winston. Winston reveals that this "Cult" is separate from most other organized crime syndicates, as they are more uncivilized and "kill not just for business, but for sport." Winston informs Eve that one Cultist, Daniel Pine, is staying at the Prague Continental with a large bounty on his life.

Eve travels there and infiltrates Pine's room; she discovers Pine is hiding his daughter Ella from the Cult. Cult member Lena increases the bounty on Pine, causing several assassins to descend upon Pine's hotel room. Pine entrusts Ella to Eve, promising to give her information on the Cult later. As they exit the hotel, Cultist Dex shoots Pine, while Lena incapacitates Eve and kidnaps Ella. The Continental staff execute two captured assassins for their attack but spare Eve after determining she did not break any Continental rules. (Note: As established in the John Wick franchise, no contract killing is allowed in the Continental hotels.)

Eve attempts to purchase weapons from arms dealer Frank, but the Cult attacks his shop. After Eve kills the assailants, Frank helps her narrow down the location of the Cult's base in Hallstatt, Austria. As Eve enters the town, she quickly comes under attack by its inhabitants, all of whom are Cultists. Eve is eventually captured and brought to the Chancellor. He reveals the Cult is a refuge for former assassins and that Pine is his son and Ella his granddaughter. Eve breaks free before being cornered by Lena, who reveals she is her older sister. Lena says Javier abandoned her during his escape as he feared that the Cult had already indoctrinated her. The Chancellor then orders their deaths; Lena is killed, but Eve manages to escape.

The Chancellor calls the Director to declare war on the Ruska Roma. However, the Director explains that Eve went rogue and appeases the Chancellor by hiring John Wick to eliminate her. (Note: A deleted scene reveals that the Director called in the favor John owed her for helping him to escape in John Wick: Chapter 3 – Parabellum (2019).) John arrives at Hallstatt, where he finds and quickly defeats Eve, but implores her to abandon her pursuit. Eve pleads for her revenge, prompting a sympathetic John to give her until midnight to kill the Chancellor. Eve resumes fighting the Cult while John assists her from a distance as a sniper, killing Dex and several other Cultists. The Chancellor attempts to flee with Ella, but Eve corners them. The Chancellor attempts to reason with Eve, but she kills him and rescues Ella. John informs the Director of the Chancellor's demise, which she accepts, and departs the area.

Ella is reunited with a recovering Pine at the Prague Continental. Eve seeks refuge at the New York Continental, having left the Ruska Roma, and is warned by Winston that the surviving members of the Cult will seek revenge against her. While attending a ballet performance of Swan Lake by her friend Tatiana, Eve learns of a $5 million bounty on her head and, with several other audience members also receiving the message, she leaves the theater.

== Cast ==
- Ana de Armas as Eve Macarro, a ballerina who is beginning to train in the assassin traditions of the Ruska Roma. According to co-star Ian McShane, the character is under the protection of Winston and Charon in the New York Continental Hotel during the course of the film.
  - Victoria Comte as young Eve
- Anjelica Huston as the Director, the leader of the Ruska Roma, a New York-based organization of ballerina assassins
- Gabriel Byrne as the Chancellor, the leader of a dangerous cult of assassins based in Hallstatt
- Lance Reddick as Charon, the concierge at the Continental Hotel in New York and friend of Winston Scott and acquaintance of John Wick. This was Reddick's final appearance as Charon, and overall final on-screen appearance released posthumously two years following his death in March 2023.
- Norman Reedus as Daniel Pine, an assassin and the Chancellor's son who is escaping the Cult. Reedus admired Keanu Reeves for the film series' demanding "I-need-a-bottle-of-Advil-all-day-long type of job". Reedus contrasted the film's tightly choreographed fight scenes with the "loose" and "sloppy" ones in his television series The Walking Dead: Daryl Dixon.
- Catalina Sandino Moreno as Lena, an assassin working for the Chancellor. She is Eve's long-lost older sister
- Anne Parillaud as Prague Concierge (cameo cut from the theater release)
- Ian McShane as Winston Scott, the enigmatic owner of the New York Continental Hotel and friend of John Wick
- Keanu Reeves as John Wick, a legendary assassin who is on the run from the High Table

Sharon Duncan-Brewster appears as Nogi, Eve's mentor. Robert Maaser plays Dex, the Chancellor's right-hand man. Jung Doo-hong appears as Il Seong, who attempts to capture Katla. Waris Ahluwalia appears as The Eye, a cultist overseeing the town, while David Castañeda plays Javier Macarro, Eve and Lena's father who is affiliated with the Ruska Roma. Abraham Popoola stars as Frank, a high-end arms dealer based in Prague, while Ava McCarthy plays Ella Pine, the Chancellor's granddaughter and Pine's daughter. Juliet Doherty portrays Tatiana, a talented ballerina who was a former trainee of the Ruska Roma alongside Eve before she was dismissed. Daniel Bernhardt plays the Scarred Eye Assassin, after previously portraying Kirill in the first John Wick film. Rila Fukushima makes an uncredited cameo as Petra, Eve's final test who she has to kill to become an agent for the Ruska Roma.

== Production ==
=== Development ===
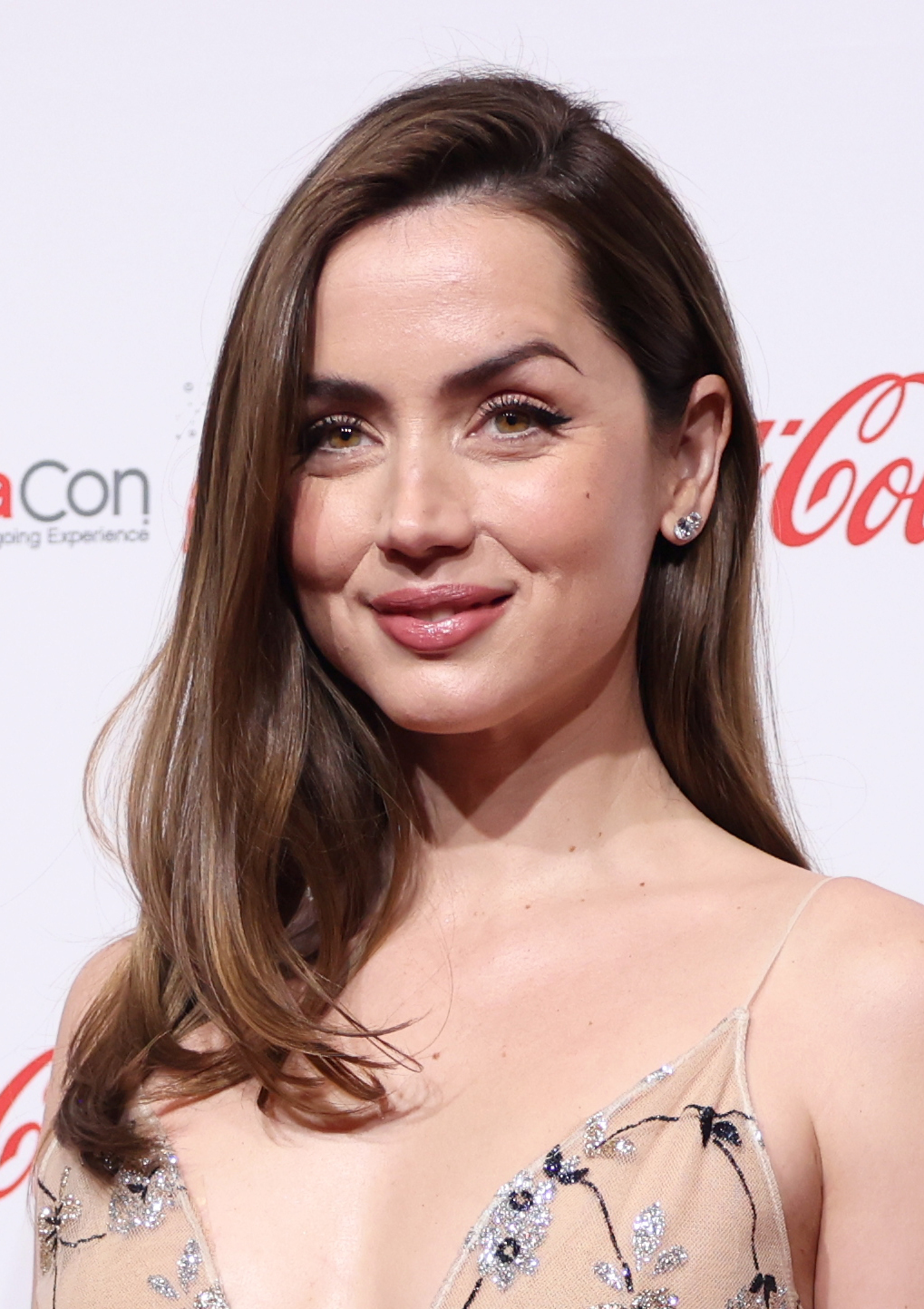
Ana de Armas (pictured) was cast in 2021 to play a ballerina-assassin named Eve Macarro.

Shay Hatten was inspired by the trailer to John Wick: Chapter 2 (2017) to write a spec script about a ballerina-assassin. Although his action-thriller Ballerina was conceived as a standalone project, when Lionsgate acquired it in July 2017, they had Hatten rewrite it as part of the John Wick universe. Thunder Road would produce the film and some of its concepts were woven into John Wick: Chapter 3 – Parabellum (2019), which features Unity Phelan portraying a ballerina. Hatten's script was voted onto The Black List of best unproduced screenplays in 2017.

By October 2019, Len Wiseman was hired as director. Wiseman was endorsed for the job after pitching his take to producer Chad Stahelski, whom Wiseman had previously directed as a stunt performer in the 2007 film Live Free or Die Hard. In May 2020, it was reported that Lionsgate was casting its leading actress, with Chloë Grace Moretz as the template for the kind of talent they were looking for. Also that month, Stahelski confirmed that he and his 87Eleven stunt team would be working closely with Wiseman on the action sequences and stunts, while acknowledging the variety Wiseman's filmmaking style would bring to the John Wick franchise. At that point, Wiseman and Hatten were working on a newer draft of the script.

By October 2021, Ana de Armas entered negotiations to play the titular character. In April 2022, Lionsgate officially announced Ballerina at CinemaCon, and revealed that de Armas would star in the lead role. By July 2022, upon de Armas's insistence for the involvement of a female screenwriter, Emerald Fennell was hired to take a pass on the script.

=== Filming ===
Initially scheduled to commence in summer 2022, principal photography officially began on November 7, 2022, in Prague, Czech Republic. Throughout the month and in early December, it was announced that Keanu Reeves, Ian McShane, Anjelica Huston, and Lance Reddick had joined the cast and would reprise their roles from previous films of the franchise; as John Wick, Winston Scott, "the Director", and Charon, respectively; Throughout December, Catalina Sandino Moreno, Norman Reedus, and Gabriel Byrne joined the supporting cast in undisclosed roles. Ballerina was in post-production in February 2023.

In February 2024, producer Chad Stahelski was working on additional action sequences for the film with director Len Wiseman. By March, David Castañeda and Sharon Duncan-Brewster joined the cast. Reportedly, Stahelski oversaw two to three months of reshoots, refilming the majority of the movie, with Wiseman not present on set. However, both Stahelski and Wiseman refuted this claim, saying that it was only two weeks of additional photography and that Stahelski oversaw it with Wiseman. Star Norman Reedus traveled from Japan to film his added fight scenes in Budapest.

== Music ==
By April 2023, Marco Beltrami and Anna Drubich were hired as the composers; Beltrami had previously worked with Wiseman on Underworld: Evolution (2006) and Live Free or Die Hard (2007). Later, in September 2024, the duo was replaced by regular franchise composers Tyler Bates and Joel J. Richard. The soundtrack to Ballerina was released by Lakeshore Records on the same day as the film's release, consisting of 25 cues.

== Marketing ==
The first marketing material for the film, shown at the April 2024 CinemaCon convention, was a short teaser trailer released to the closed-door audience. Entertainment Weekly reported that the trailer included Charon, Winston, Norman Reedus's undisclosed character, and Wick in a cameo appearance at the end. There, its title was presented as John Wick Presents: Ballerina. Bleeding Cool called the footage "exactly what CinemaCon dreams are made of". On September 26, 2024, the film's first trailer was released by Lionsgate.

== Release ==
Ballerina was released in the United States on June 6, 2025, after being delayed a year from its originally announced date of June 7, 2024.

== Reception ==
=== Box office ===
Ballerina grossed $58.1 million in the United States and Canada, and $82.1 million in other territories, for a worldwide total of $140.2 million.

In the United States and Canada, Ballerina was projected to gross $28–30 million from 3,409 theaters in its opening weekend. It made $10.5 million on its first day, including $3.75 million from Thursday previews. It went on to debut to $24.5 million, slightly below projections and finishing in second behind holdover Lilo & Stitch. In its second weekend the film made $9.4 million (a drop of 62%), falling to fifth place behind Mission: Impossible – The Final Reckoning, Materialists, Lilo & Stitch and How to Train Your Dragon.

=== Critical response ===
Ballerina received generally positive critical response. On the review aggregator website Rotten Tomatoes, 75% of 305 critics' reviews are positive, with an average rating of 6.7/10. The website's consensus reads: "Equipping a steely Ana de Armas with creatively brutal action choreography and a pleasingly kooky origin story, Ballerina pirouettes gracefully onto the Wickverse's centerstage." Metacritic, which uses a weighted average, assigned the film a score of 59 out of 100, based on 49 critics, indicating "mixed or average" reviews. Audiences polled by CinemaScore gave the film a grade of "A–" on an A+ to F scale, while those surveyed by PostTrak gave it an 87% positive score, with 79% saying they would definitely recommend it.

Alison Willmore of Vulture gave a positive review: "It's absurd, and thrilling, and gorgeous, and I don't know what got us there, but while Ballerina doesn't start off as a real John Wick movie, it sure ends as one." Clint Gage of IGN wrote, "It's a spinoff that knows why the John Wick series has been so successful, and both effectively follows the rules while adding to the ever expanding world. While it takes a good portion of its screentime to find confident footing, when the second half gets moving, the energy is undeniable as Ballerina becomes one funny, bloody and creative fight scene after another."

Justin Clark of Slant Magazine was more critical of the film: "Sans a mythology of its own, or any substantive ties into where the John Wick films go chronologically after this, Ballerina is just another 87Eleven joint."

=== Accolades ===
Award	Date of ceremony	Category	Recipient(s)	Result	Ref.
Alliance of Women Film Journalists	December 31, 2025	Female Focus: Best Stunts Performance	Ana de Armas	Nominated	
Astra Midseason Movie Awards	July 3, 2025	Best Stunts	Ballerina	Runner-up	
Austin Film Critics Association	December 18, 2025	Best Stunt Work	Ballerina	Nominated	
Critics' Choice Awards	January 4, 2026	Best Stunt Design	Stephen Dunlevy, Kyle Gardiner, Jackson Spidell, Jeremy Marinas, Jan Petřina, Domonkos Párdányi, and Kinga Kósa-Gavalda	Nominated	
Critics' Choice Super Awards	August 7, 2025	Best Actress in an Action Movie	Ana de Armas	Nominated	
Golden Trailer Awards	May 29, 2025	Best Action	"Trigger" (Lionsgate / AV Squad)	Won	
Golden Trailer Awards	May 29, 2025	Best Summer 2025 Blockbuster Trailer	"Fate" (Lionsgate / AV Squad)	Nominated	
Golden Trailer Awards	May 28, 2026	Best Action Poster	Music Box / Lionsgate / AV Print	Nominated	
Golden Trailer Awards	May 28, 2026	Best Teaser Poster	Smoking Gun Poster / Lionsgate / AV Print	Won	
Houston Film Critics Society	January 20, 2026	Best Stunt Coordination Team	Ballerina	Nominated	
Las Vegas Film Critics Society	December 19, 2025	Best Action Film	Ballerina	Nominated	
Las Vegas Film Critics Society	December 19, 2025	Best Stunts	Ballerina	Nominated	
San Diego Film Critics Society	December 15, 2025	Best Stunt Choreography	Ballerina	Nominated	
Saturn Awards	March 8, 2026	Best Action / Adventure Film	Ballerina	Nominated	
Seattle Film Critics Society	December 15, 2025	Best Action Choreography	Stephen Dunlevy and Jackson Spidell	Nominated	
St. Louis Film Critics Association	December 14, 2025	Best Stunts	Stephen Dunlevy, Kyle Gardiner, Jackson Spidell, Jeremy Marinas, Jan Petřina, Domonkos Párdányi, and Kinga Kósa-Gavalda	Nominated	
Taurus World Stunt Awards	February 22, 2026	Best Fight	Tarell Bullock, Bruce Concepcion, Adam Lytle, Jerry Quill, and Miklós Szentváry-Lukács (Note: The Javier Stunt double fights his way to safety. Taking out a team of stunt Paladins, by utilizing the geography of his Villa to his advantage. Attackers are thrown down stairs, through tables, and smashed across chairs in an effort to evade capture.)	Nominated	
Taurus World Stunt Awards	February 22, 2026	Best Fight	Kim Chanran, Seo Da Ye, Park Jooween, Doohong Jung, and Chau Naumova (Note: The Stunt Double fights her way through assassins in a night club. The sequence took place over multiple levels with practical fights and falls.)	Nominated	
Taurus World Stunt Awards	February 22, 2026	Best Overall Stunt by a Stunt Woman	Chau Naumova	Nominated	
Taurus World Stunt Awards	February 22, 2026	Best Specialty Stunt	Seregi András, Jayson Dumenigo, Róbert Kovalik, Ivan Orsanyi, and Gyula Tóth (Note: The hero uses a flame thrower, igniting multiple opponents into full burns. All burns were practical and were lit with the flame thrower.)	Won	
Taurus World Stunt Awards	February 22, 2026	Best Stunt Coordinator and/or 2nd Unit Director	Stephen Dunlevy, Kyle Gardiner, and Darrin Prescott	Nominated	

== Future ==
In March 2023, producer Erica Lee said the studio has plans to develop a sequel with de Armas returning as Eve.

In a 2025 interview after the film's release, Wiseman spoke about his ideas for a continuation of the story, including Eve having to "deal with the consequences of her actions." He said he cast Norman Reedus because he has plans for his character.
