= John Wick: Chapter 4 =

2023 film directed by Chad Stahelski

- Theatrical release poster
- Directed by: Chad Stahelski
- Written by: Shay Hatten; Michael Finch
- Based on: Characters by Derek Kolstad
- Produced by: Basil Iwanyk; Erica Lee; Chad Stahelski
- Starring: Keanu Reeves; Donnie Yen; Bill Skarsgård; Laurence Fishburne; Hiroyuki Sanada; Shamier Anderson; Lance Reddick; Rina Sawayama; Scott Adkins; Clancy Brown; Ian McShane
- Cinematography: Dan Laustsen
- Edited by: Nathan Orloff
- Music by: Tyler Bates; Joel J. Richard
- Production companies: Summit Entertainment; Thunder Road Films; 87Eleven Entertainment
- Distributed by: Lionsgate
- Release dates: March 6, 2023 (London); March 24, 2023 (United States)
- Running time: 169 minutes
- Country: United States
- Language: English
- Budget: $100 million
- Box office: $447.3 million

John Wick: Chapter 4 is a 2023 American epic action thriller film, directed and co-produced by Chad Stahelski and written by Shay Hatten and Michael Finch. It is the fourth installment in the John Wick film series, and the sequel to John Wick: Chapter 3 – Parabellum (2019). Keanu Reeves returns as the title John Wick, who sets out for revenge on the High Table and those who left him for dead. Chapter 4 also features Laurence Fishburne, Lance Reddick, and Ian McShane reprising their roles from previous films, with Donnie Yen, Bill Skarsgård, Hiroyuki Sanada, Shamier Anderson, Rina Sawayama, Scott Adkins, and Clancy Brown appearing in new roles.

Development of the fourth John Wick film, formally announced by Lionsgate in May 2019, was confirmed before the release of its predecessor. It is the first film in the franchise that was not written by franchise creator Derek Kolstad; Hatten was hired in May 2020, then Finch in March 2021. Principal photography took place from June to October 2021 in France, Germany, New York City, and Japan.

The film's planned 2021 release was delayed by the COVID-19 pandemic. John Wick: Chapter 4 premiered at the Odeon Luxe Leicester Square in London on March 6, 2023, and was released in the United States on March 24. The film received critical acclaim for its action sequences, Stahelski's direction, cinematography, choreography, visual style, writing, score, and performances. It earned over $447 million worldwide on a $100 million budget, becoming the highest-grossing film in the franchise. A spin-off set between the third and fourth films, titled Ballerina, was released in 2025. Though Chapter 4 was initially intended to be the conclusion of the series, a sequel is in development.

== Plot ==
In New York City, John Wick, hiding underground with the Bowery King, recovers after being shot off the roof of the Continental Hotel by Winston. (Note: As depicted in John Wick: Chapter 3 – Parabellum (2019)) Seeking to exact vengeance against the High Table, he travels to Morocco and kills the Elder, the "one who sits above the Table". In response, the High Table sends the Marquis Vincent Bisset de Gramont with unlimited resources to kill John.

In New York, the Marquis summons Winston and his concierge Charon, and chastises Winston for previously failing to kill John. As punishment, the Marquis strips Winston of his managerial duties, declares him "excommunicado", destroys the New York Continental, and executes Charon. The Marquis then enlists John's old friend, Caine – a blind, retired High Table assassin – to kill him, forcing Caine to comply by threatening to murder his daughter.

John seeks refuge at the Osaka Continental, operated by his friend Shimazu Koji. Caine and Chidi, the Marquis' second-in-command, arrive with High Table enforcers to investigate. Koji's daughter, Akira, evacuates the hotel before the High Table "deconsecrates" it, instigating a melee. John battles many armored personnel, culminating in a showdown with Caine. A "Tracker" named Mr. Nobody interrupts their fight, letting John escape after deeming the bounty on him insufficient. A wounded Koji attacks Caine on John's behalf until Caine reluctantly kills him. Caine spares Akira.

John returns to New York and meets a vengeful Winston at Charon's gravesite. Winston suggests invoking an old High Table tradition to challenge the Marquis to a duel. Winning would free John from obligations to the High Table, but he can only request a duel on behalf of a crime family. John travels to the Berlin headquarters of the Ruska Roma crime syndicate to seek readmission. His adoptive sister, Katia, requires that he kill Killa Harkan, a High Table member the Marquis paid to murder her father. Katia tasks her henchman Klaus Shields to escort John to Harkan's nightclub. At the nightclub, Killa ambushes John after a game of poker, but with help from Caine and Mr. Nobody, John kills him and regains his status. Winston conveys John's challenge to the Marquis, acting as his "second". Winston requests that, if John wins, Winston's own "excommunicado" will be revoked, and he will be reinstated as manager of a New York Continental rebuilt by the High Table. However, if John loses, Winston would also die.

In Paris, John and the Marquis finalize the duel's terms – dueling pistols at sunrise at Sacré-Cœur – under the Harbinger's moderation. The Marquis chooses a reluctant Caine to duel John as his proxy, while the Harbinger warns that John and Winston will be executed if either is late. The Bowery King arrives in Paris to give John a pistol and a ballistic suit. The Marquis sets a $25 million bounty on John to delay him. John fights off numerous assassins, unknowingly helped by Mr. Nobody, who forces the Marquis to increase the bounty to $40 million so he can claim it for himself. However, Mr. Nobody ultimately ceases his pursuit when John saves Mr. Nobody's dog from Chidi.

After Caine, Mr. Nobody, and Mr. Nobody's dog assist John in fighting off dozens of assassins – including Chidi, whom Mr. Nobody kills – on the Rue Foyatier, they reach the summit on time. John and Caine wound each other through two rounds of dueling, and the third round comes to a halt when Caine seriously wounds John. Demanding the right to administer the coup de grâce, the Marquis eagerly swaps places with Caine. Winston chides the Marquis for his arrogance, revealing that John had not fired his third bullet. John promptly executes the Marquis with a headshot, ending the duel. The Harbinger grants John and Caine (as well as his daughter) their freedom from the High Table and reinstates Winston as the Hotel Manager of the New York Continental. John reflects upon his life and marriage before collapsing from his injuries. Sometime later, back in New York, Winston and the Bowery King bid farewell to John at a gravestone with his name, located next to one for his wife Helen. (Note: While director Chad Stahelski and star Keanu Reeves initially affirmed that John is deceased, Stahelski later stated that the ending was intentionally left ambiguous and open to interpretation.)

Caine returns to Paris in the final scene after the credits to reunite with his daughter, but is approached by a vengeful, knife-wielding Akira.

== Cast ==
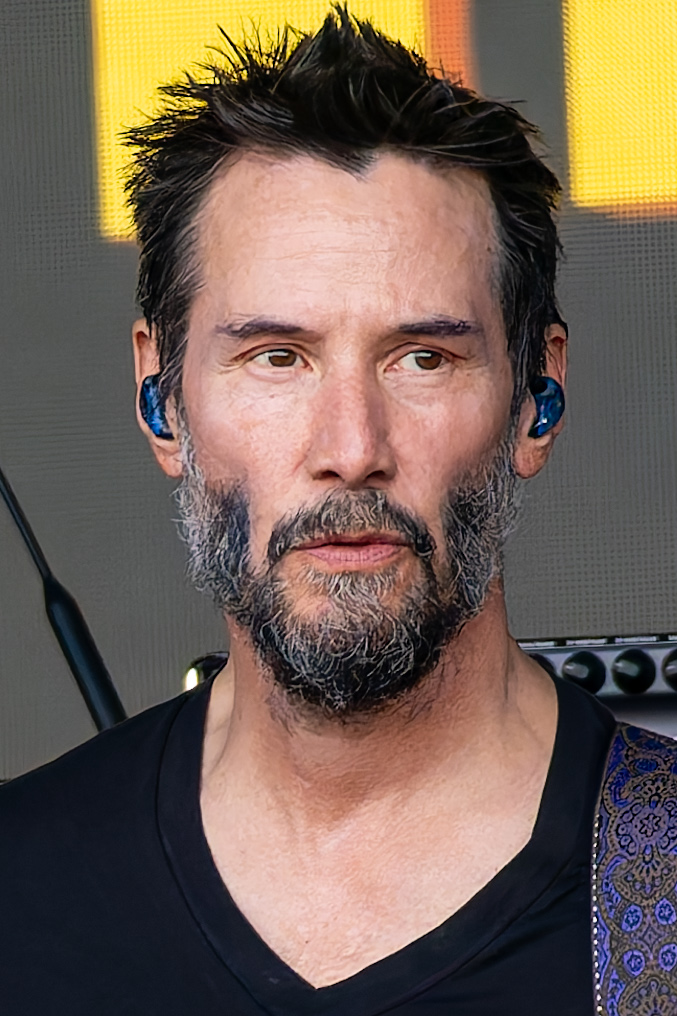
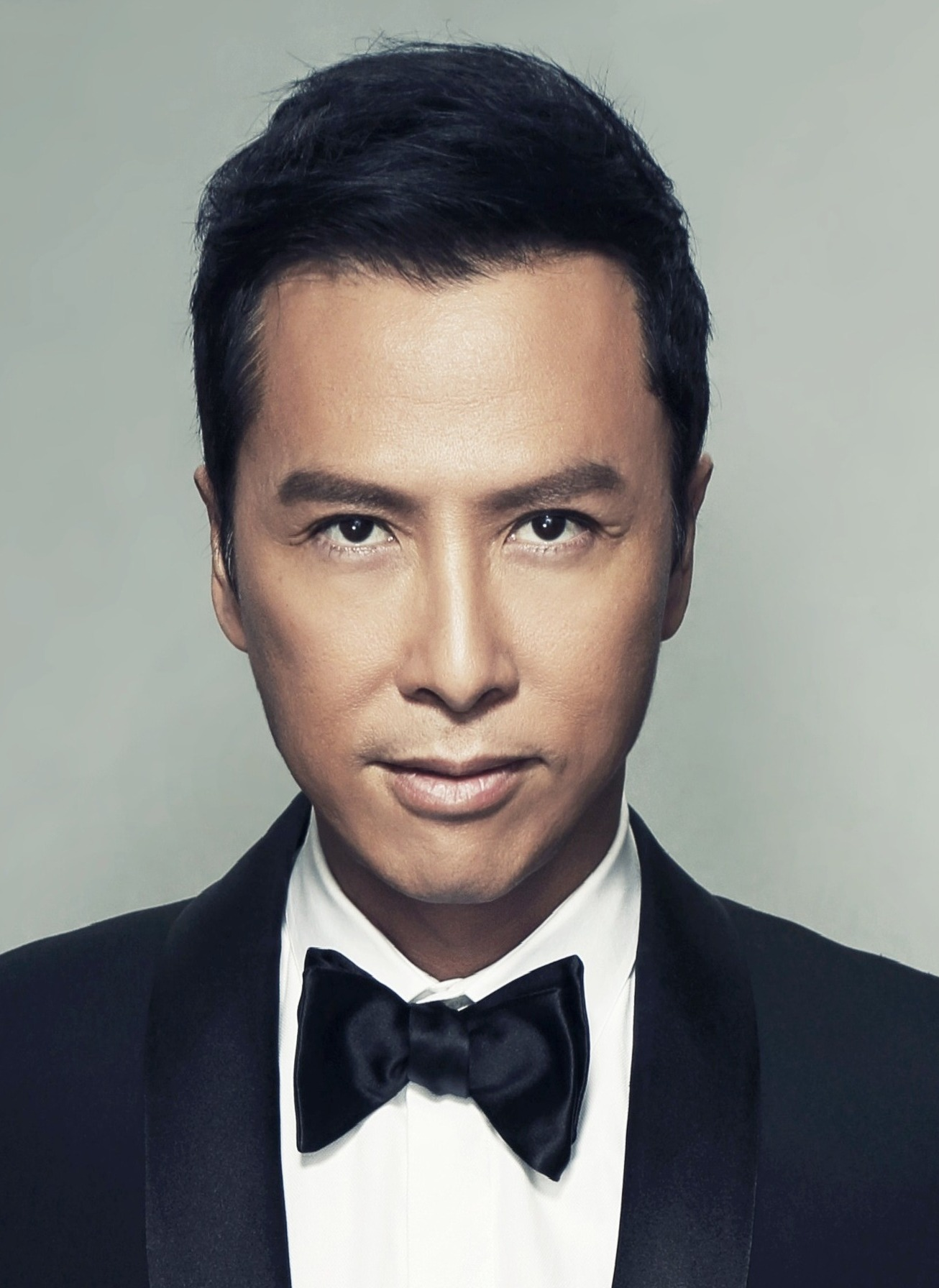
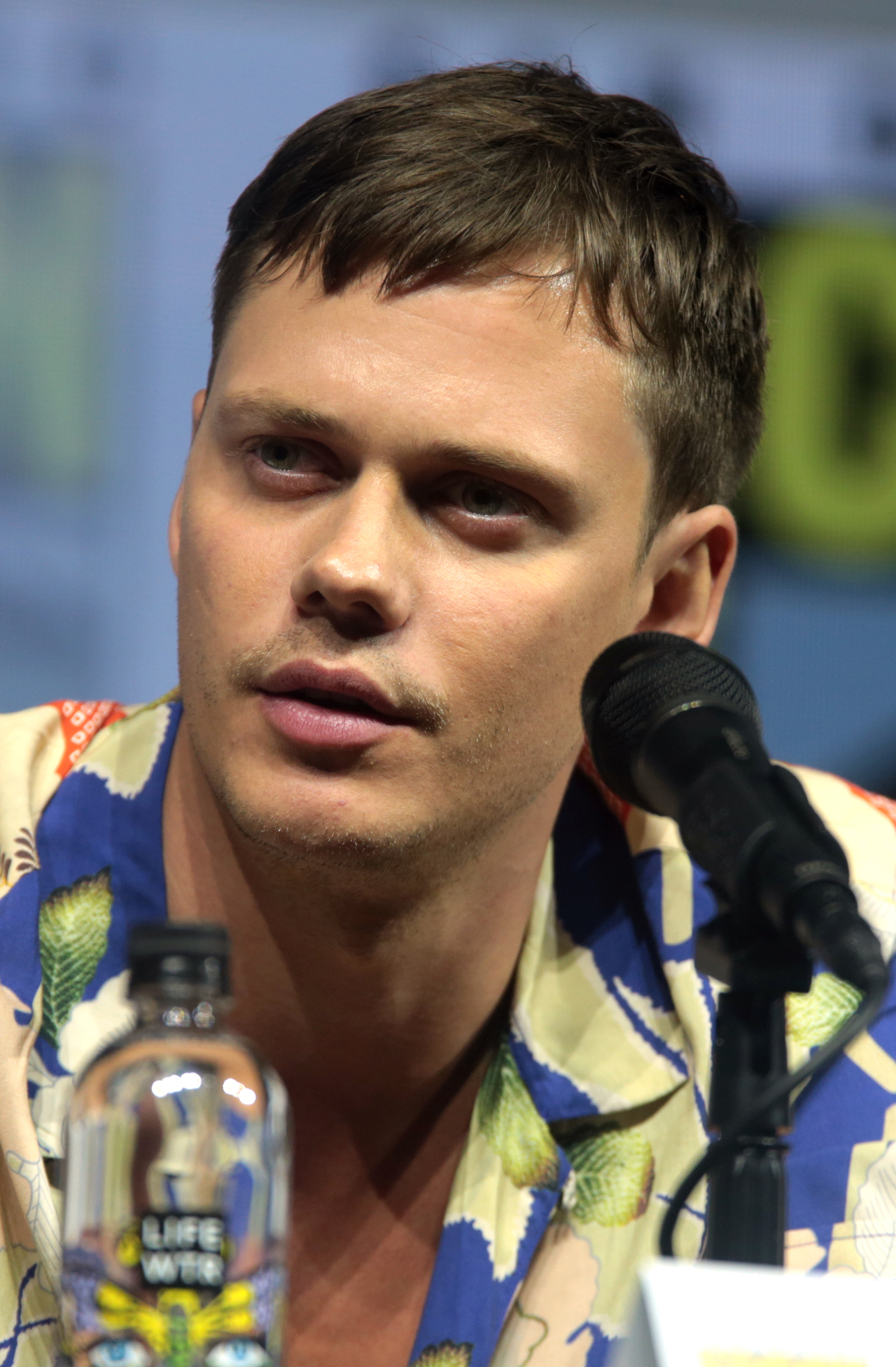
Keanu Reeves (pictured in 2024), Donnie Yen, and Bill Skarsgård (both 2018)
- Keanu Reeves as John Wick, a professional hitman and assassin who has gained a legendary reputation for his set of skills and is now hunted by the High Table.
- Donnie Yen as Caine, a blind High Table assassin and an old friend of Wick, who is forced out of retirement to kill Wick to ensure the safety of his daughter.
- Bill Skarsgård as the Marquis Vincent Bisset de Gramont, a powerful member of the High Table whose position is challenged by Wick.
- Laurence Fishburne as the Bowery King, a former underground crime boss who was left for dead by the High Table and is now sponsoring Wick.
- Hiroyuki Sanada as Shimazu Koji, the manager of the Osaka Continental Hotel and an old friend of Wick and Caine.
- Shamier Anderson as Mr. Nobody / The Tracker, a bounty hunter pursuing Wick.
- Lance Reddick as Charon, the concierge at the Continental Hotel in New York.
- Rina Sawayama as Shimazu Akira, Koji's daughter and concierge of the Osaka Continental.
- Marko Zaror as Chidi, the second-in-command of the Marquis de Gramont.
- Scott Adkins as Killa Harkan, the head of the German Table.
- Clancy Brown as the Harbinger, a high-ranking operative of the High Table.
- Ian McShane as Winston Scott, the manager of the New York Continental Hotel and friend of Wick.
- Aimée Kwan as Mia, Caine's violin-playing daughter.
- Natalia Tena portrays Katia Javanavič, Wick's adoptive sister.
- George Georgiou appears as the Elder, "the one who sits above the Table", a different character than the one played by Saïd Taghmaoui in Parabellum (2019).
- Bridget Moynahan appears as Wick's late wife, Helen, via archive footage from the first film.
- Infamous German bouncer Sven Marquardt appears as Ruska Roma member Klaus.
- German actor and YouTube personality Andrej Kaminsky also appears as the Ruska Roma's Orthodox priest.
- Retired sumo wrestlers Yoshinori Tashiro and Hishofuji Hiroki made appearances as the Osaka Continental gatekeepers.
- Japanese actress and stunt performer Saori Izawa doubles Rina Sawayama for Akira's action scenes and also appears as an assassin at the Osaka Continental.

== Production ==
=== Development ===
On May 20, 2019, Lionsgate announced John Wick: Chapter 4 via their opt-in "John Wick" text update service, writing, "You have served. You will be of service. John Wick: Chapter 4 is coming – May 21, 2021". In early August 2020, Lionsgate CEO Jon Feltheimer stated during an earnings call, "We're also busy preparing scripts for the next two installments of our John Wick action franchise, with John Wick 4 anticipated to hit theatres Memorial Day weekend 2022. We hope to shoot both John Wick 4 and 5 back to back when Keanu becomes available early next year."

Before the third film's release, director Chad Stahelski confirmed on a Reddit "AMA" thread that there had been discussion for another film, and that he would be involved with the project should the third film be successful. Despite this announcement back then, it was not confirmed if star Keanu Reeves would return for a new installment. However, he told GQ that he would carry on the role as long as the audience wanted it, saying, "As far as my legs can take me, as far as the audience wants to go."

Stahelski later teased the fourth film in an interview with IndieWire by saying Wick would not end the fourth film with "a happy ending", saying, "John may survive all this shit but at the end of it, there's no happy ending. He's got nowhere to go. Honestly, I challenge you right now, here's a question for you: How do you fucking want me to end it? Do you think he's going to ride off into the fucking sunset? He's killed 300 fucking people and he's just going to [walk away], everything's okay? He's just going to fall in love with a love interest? If you're this fucking guy, if this guy exist[ed], how is this guy's day going to end? He's fucked for the rest of his life. It's just a matter of time." Additionally, Stahelski teased Winston's fate in the fourth film, saying, "He meant to shoot him. Did he mean to kill him? That's open for interpretation, you can take it one of two ways, and that's kind of where we pick up some of the unanswered questions in John Wick 4." The studio opted to move on from series creator Derek Kolstad and instead hired Shay Hatten to write the script in May 2020. In February, Stahelski brought Ricky Staub and Dan Walser on board to write the film after being impressed with their film Concrete Cowboy. In March 2021, screenwriting duties were passed onto Predators screenwriter Michael Finch.

=== Writing ===
The film was written by Shay Hatten and Michael Finch. In an interview with Finch by Looper magazine, Finch stated that there were several previous films which influenced his writing stating: "A lot of this begins with Chad being inspired by other films, other genres of film, be it Once Upon a Time in the West, The Good, the Bad and the Ugly or be it Bullitt or Dirty Harry or a Zatoichi film." The role played by the blind assassin portrayed by Donnie Yen references the blind swordsman in the Japanese film series centred on the character of Zatoichi. The name of the character Killa Harkan is a reference to Berlin-based Turkish rapper Killa Hakan.

=== Casting ===
When the fourth film was announced, Reeves reported having begun his training course for John Wick 4 and The Matrix Resurrections. In May 2021, it was announced that Rina Sawayama would make her feature film debut in John Wick Chapter 4. She was selected due to the role requiring someone who can do choreography, and Stahelski had seen her music videos for "XS" and "Bad Friend" that feature dance and fighting, respectively. The following month, Laurence Fishburne, Hiroyuki Sanada, Donnie Yen, Bill Skarsgård, Shamier Anderson, and Scott Adkins were cast in the film. Sanada was initially courted to portray Zero in Chapter 3, but dropped out due to a torn Achilles tendon injury. In July 2021, Lance Reddick was confirmed to be reprising his role as Charon, and Ian McShane was confirmed to be reprising his role as Winston. Clancy Brown joined the cast that August.

=== Set design and weapons selection ===
Most of the weapons used in the film were chosen from stock and custom weapon design firms and were already in existence before filming. De Gramont nominates a reluctant Caine to fight in his place in a duel using enhanced 20th-century Thompson/Center Contenders in the sunrise scene at Sacré-Cœur. The Bowery King when he arrives in Paris hands John a custom 21-round Pit Viper pistol manufactured by TTI.

Near the start of the film, the character of Caine is shown handling an opulent gold watch from the jeweler Carl F. Bucherer with an image portrait of his daughter inside of the gold case closure lid.

=== Filming ===
Principal photography began on June 28, 2021, on a $100 million budget, and took place in France, Germany, New York City, and Japan. Several French crew, including the location manager, described filming in Paris as "hell"; due to a two-week delay filming in Germany, Stahelski had less time to scout Paris and would improvise and change locations last minute. Filming took place at Luxembourg Gardens and the Church of St. Eustache. The introductory scene was filmed in a Parisian "sunken cathedral", "La Défense Cathedral". The chase-shootout around the Arc de Triomphe was finished at a disused airport near Berlin. The efforts of the location team were recognized by the Location Managers Guild International with their 2023 LMGI Award. The top-down long take action sequence was inspired by the 2019 video game The Hong Kong Massacre and was filmed on a purpose-built set. An alternate ending in which John visits his grave was filmed but abandoned after receiving a "violent reaction" from test audiences.

Filming concluded on October 27.

=== Post-production ===
Stahelski described an early cut of John Wick: Chapter 4 as "screwed" because the expanded worldbuilding of its title character and the introduction of new characters took 225 minutes of screen time. Nathan Orloff edited the film substantially to reduce the runtime to 169 minutes. The film was originally subtitled Hagakure, to match Parabellum.

== Music ==
Tyler Bates and Joel J. Richard return to compose the score for the film, after doing so for the previous three films. The soundtrack album was released by Lakeshore Records on March 24, 2023.

The film features EDM tracks from widely-known artists in the genre, like Gesaffelstein and Justice, as well as Le Castle Vania, whose work largely consisted of remixes of his work from the first two films. Most of the artists featured in the soundtrack are French, and therefore fit with the majority of the third act of the film taking place in Paris.

== Release ==
John Wick: Chapter 4 was released on March 24, 2023.

Lionsgate officially announced the film in May 2019 during Parabellum's opening week, with a scheduled release date of May 21, 2021. On May 1, 2020, IndieWire reported that the fourth film's release had been delayed to May 2022 by the COVID-19 pandemic and Reeves' commitments to The Matrix Resurrections, which had been slated for release on the same day as Wick 4. "The Matrix 4 was only four weeks in when this all happened"—that is, production was halted, Stahelski said, "So, Keanu's gotta go finish his commitment up on The Matrix, which is a big deal and which I think will probably take him until the end of the year. Then we have to go into our prep mode and then we'll start. So release dates...who knows right now?"

The film's release was further delayed to March 24, 2023, in part to avoid opening against Top Gun: Maverick. The film had its premiere at the Odeon Luxe Leicester Square in London on March 6, 2023. It also had a special screening at the 2023 South by Southwest Film & TV Festival on March 13, 2023. It was released in South Korea on April 12, 2023. The film was released in Japan as John Wick: Consequences.

On 28 February 2025, it was announced that the film will be released in China on 14 March 2025, after an almost 2-year delay. This makes John Wick: Chapter 4 the first film in the franchise to be released in China. Similar to other parts of Asia, marketing materials within China focused marketing efforts on Donnie Yen, placing him at the front of local film posters alongside Keanu Reeves similar to a buddy cop film, and sharing clips of Yen's performance in the film on popular Chinese social media site Weibo and RedNote; as well as all major film ticketing sites.

=== Home media ===
John Wick: Chapter 4 was released digitally on May 23, 2023. The Blu-ray, 4K UHD, and DVD were released on June 13, 2023. An extended cut was confirmed by the director on June 21, 2023, to be released at an unspecified date. The film became available on Netflix in the United Kingdom on October 22, 2024.

== Reception ==
=== Box office ===
John Wick: Chapter 4 grossed $187.1 million in the United States and Canada, and $260 million in other territories, for a worldwide total of $447.3 million.

In the United States and Canada, John Wick: Chapter 4 was projected to gross $65 million to 70 million from 3,855 theaters in its opening weekend. The film made $29.4 million on its first day, including $8.9 million from Thursday night previews, the best of the series, and the best of any R-rated film released since March 2020. It went on to debut at $73.8 million, topping the box office and marking the best opening weekend of the franchise. It was also the best opening weekend for Lionsgate and any R-rated film since the start of the COVID-19 pandemic in March 2020, with the latter record surpassing Halloween Kills. Upon its debut, the film had the second-highest live-action opening weekend for a Keanu Reeves film, behind The Matrix Reloaded. This also marked the year's second-highest opening weekend at the time of its release, after Ant-Man and the Wasp: Quantumania. The film made $28.3 million in its sophomore weekend (a drop of 61.6%), finishing second behind newcomer Dungeons & Dragons: Honor Among Thieves. In its third weekend, the film made $14.6 million, again finishing second, this time behind The Super Mario Bros. Movie.

Outside of the US and Canada, the film grossed $64 million from 71 markets in its opening weekend. In its second weekend John Wick: Chapter 4 made $35 million from 75 markets. The film grossed $21.5 million in its third weekend. As of June 5, 2023, the highest-grossing territories were the United Kingdom ($21.1 million), Germany ($20.7 million), Australia ($16.6 million), South Korea ($15.2 million) and CIS ($14.2 million).

The film was released on 14 March 2025 in China at 6pm. Despite the delayed release of almost 2 years and impact from rampant piracy, the film opened well to $3.3 million over its opening weekend, out-performing Mickey 17 's 10-day haul in two and a half days and benefited from the presence of Hong Kong action star Donnie Yen, who was kept front and center in local marketing and went on to gross a total of $ 6.2 million. As of 1 May 2025, the film is the 3rd highest grossing Hollywood film in China for the year only behind A Minecraft Movie and Captain America: Brave New World.

=== Critical response ===
On the review aggregator website Rotten Tomatoes, 94% of 374 critics' reviews are positive, with an average rating of 8.1/10. The website's consensus reads: "John Wick: Chapter 4 piles on more of everything—and suggests that when it comes to a well-dressed Keanu Reeves dispatching his enemies in lethally balletic style, there can never be too much." Metacritic, which uses a weighted average, assigned the film a score of 78 out of 100, based on 58 critics, indicating "generally favorable" reviews. Audiences polled by CinemaScore gave the film an average grade of "A" on an A+ to F scale, the highest grade in the series to date, while those polled by PostTrak gave it a 93% positive score, with 82% saying they would definitely recommend it.

Frank Scheck of The Hollywood Reporter gave the film a positive review, calling it "bigger, badder, bolder, longer, and featuring nearly more spectacular set pieces than one movie can comfortably handle, this epic action film practically redefines the stakes." Tom Jorgensen of IGN gave the film a 10/10 score, describing it as a "modern epic" and "bursting at the seams with creative, thrillingly staged action choreography and cinematography" while giving particular praise to the performances of Reeves, Yen and Skarsgård. In a five-star review for IndieWire, Rafael Motamayor praised the film as the "best American action blockbuster since George Miller's Mad Max: Fury Road". He praised the additions to the franchise's "ludicrously complex" mythology, citing the film's grounded character relationships and cinematographer Dan Laustsen's use of neon colors and his technique of shooting a single-shot fight scene.

Chicago Sun-Times's Richard Roeper gave the film three out of four stars, writing "Somewhere inside the utterly unnecessary, bloated running time for John Wick IV, there's a brilliant, stripped-down, 100-minute classic of a drive-in action film, where the admittedly breathtaking action sequences don't grind on for so long that they become borderline tedious." Richard Brody of The New Yorker was ambivalent on much of the film, but found that the "giddily intense, swoony, swashbuckling, and sensational" ending makes the rest of the film "worth sitting through". The Daily Nebraskan's Evan Dondlinger highly praised the film, calling it "what all action movies should be", and hailed it as a "masterclass of stunt coordination, color in cinema and grand storytelling".

Charles Bramesco of The Guardian gave the film two out of five stars, writing: "Those who appreciated the original for its brutal, sinewy agility have another thing coming: a lumbering, stultifying gargantuan of a film willing to kill everything except its darlings." Reviewing the film for Consequence, Liz Miller gave the film a C+ and said: "Watching John Wick: Chapter 4 sometimes felt like watching an above-average assembly cut. At an unwieldy two hours and 49 minutes, your eye will immediately be drawn to what cuts through the noise – and there are plenty of these moments. But 'moments' does not a well-told 'movie' make." Conversely, Nerdist's Michael Walsh hailed the film as one of the best action films ever made, remarking "By the time the credits rolled, I was ready to run through a brick wall. I had so much adrenaline pumping through me I wanted to bench-press a bus. [...] The only other time I walked out of a theater feeling that way was Mad Max: Fury Road. John Wick: Chapter 4 isn't just the best installment in the series. It's on the very short list of greatest action movies ever made".

=== Accolades ===
Award	Date of Ceremony	Category	Recipient(s)	Result	Ref.
Golden Trailer Awards	June 29, 2023	Best Action	"Legend" (AV Squad)	Won	
Golden Trailer Awards	June 29, 2023	Best Sound Editing	"Peace" (TRANSIT)	Nominated	
Golden Trailer Awards	June 29, 2023	Best Teaser Poster	"Hourglass Portrait" (AV Print)	Nominated	
Golden Trailer Awards	June 29, 2023	Best Wildposts	"Illumicade" (AV Print)	Won	
Golden Trailer Awards	June 29, 2023	Best Radio/Audio Spot (For a Feature Film or TV/Streaming Series)	"King" (Silk Factory)	Nominated	
Hollywood Critics Association Midseason Film Awards	June 30, 2023	Best Picture	John Wick: Chapter 4	Nominated	
Hollywood Critics Association Midseason Film Awards	June 30, 2023	Best Director	Chad Stahelski	Nominated	
Hollywood Critics Association Midseason Film Awards	June 30, 2023	Best Stunts	John Wick: Chapter 4	Won	
Hollywood Professional Association Awards	November 28, 2023	Outstanding Sound – Feature Film	Mark Stoeckinger, Andy Koyama, Casey Genton, Alan Rankin, and Manfred Banach (Formosa Group)	Won	
Location Managers Guild Awards	August 26, 2023	Outstanding Locations in a Contemporary Film	John Wick: Chapter 4	Won	
MTV Movie & TV Awards	May 7, 2023	Best Fight	Keanu Reeves vs. Everyone	Nominated	
National Board of Review Awards	December 6, 2023	Outstanding Achievement in Stunt Artistry	Chad Stahelski and Stephen Dunlevy & Scott Rogers	Won	
Washington D.C. Area Film Critics Association Awards	December 10, 2023	Best Editing	Nathan Orloff	Nominated	
IndieWire Critics Poll	December 11, 2023	Best Cinematography	Dan Laustsen	10th Place	
Chicago Film Critics Association Awards	December 12, 2023	Best Editing	Nathan Orloff	Nominated	
Las Vegas Film Critics Society	December 13, 2023	Best Action Movie	John Wick: Chapter 4	Won	
Las Vegas Film Critics Society	December 13, 2023	Best Stunts	John Wick: Chapter 4	Nominated	
Indiana Film Journalists Association	December 17, 2023	Best Film	John Wick: Chapter 4	Nominated	
Indiana Film Journalists Association	December 17, 2023	Best Director	Chad Stahelski	Nominated	
Indiana Film Journalists Association	December 17, 2023	Best Editing	Nathan Orloff	Nominated	
Indiana Film Journalists Association	December 17, 2023	Best Cinematography	Dan Laustsen	Runner-up	
Indiana Film Journalists Association	December 17, 2023	Best Stunt/Movement Choreography	Laurent Demianoff	Won	
St. Louis Film Critics Association	December 17, 2023	Best Action Film	John Wick: Chapter 4	Won (Note: Tied with Mission: Impossible – Dead Reckoning Part One)	
St. Louis Film Critics Association	December 17, 2023	Best Stunts	Scott Rogers and Stephen Dunlevy	Runner-up	
St. Louis Film Critics Association	December 17, 2023	Best Scene	"Fight on the 222 steps leading up to the Sacré-Cœur Basilica in Paris"	Runner-up	
San Diego Film Critics Society	December 19, 2023	Best Stunt Choreography	John Wick: Chapter 4	Won	
San Diego Film Critics Society	December 19, 2023	Best Visual Effects	John Wick: Chapter 4	Nominated	
Florida Film Critics Circle Awards	December 21, 2023	Best Supporting Actor	Donnie Yen	Nominated	
Florida Film Critics Circle Awards	December 21, 2023	Best Cinematography	Dan Laustsen	Won	
Astra Film and Creative Arts Awards	January 6, 2024	Best Action Feature	John Wick: Chapter 4	Won	
Astra Film and Creative Arts Awards	February 26, 2024	Best Cinematography	Dan Laustsen	Nominated	
Astra Film and Creative Arts Awards	February 26, 2024	Best Editing	Nathan Orloff	Won	
Astra Film and Creative Arts Awards	February 26, 2024	Best Publicity Campaign	John Wick: Chapter 4	Nominated	
Astra Film and Creative Arts Awards	February 26, 2024	Best Sound	John Wick: Chapter 4	Nominated	
Astra Film and Creative Arts Awards	February 26, 2024	Best Stunts	John Wick: Chapter 4	Won	
Astra Film and Creative Arts Awards	February 26, 2024	Spotlight Award	Chad Stahelski and Stunt Team	Won	
Golden Globe Awards	January 7, 2024	Cinematic and Box Office Achievement	John Wick: Chapter 4	Nominated	
Seattle Film Critics Society Awards	January 8, 2024	Best Action Choreography	John Wick: Chapter 4	Won	
Austin Film Critics Association Awards	January 10, 2024	Best Stunt Coordinator	Stephen Dunlevy and Scott Rogers	Won	
Houston Film Critics Society	January 22, 2024	Best Stunt Coordination Team	John Wick: Chapter 4	Won	
Saturn Awards	February 4, 2024	Best Action or Adventure Film	John Wick: Chapter 4	Nominated	
Saturn Awards	February 4, 2024	Best Actor	Keanu Reeves	Nominated	
Saturn Awards	February 4, 2024	Best Production Design	Kevin Kavanaugh	Nominated	
Saturn Awards	February 4, 2024	Best Editing	Nathan Orloff	Nominated	
Saturn Awards	February 4, 2024	Best 4K Home Media Release	John Wick: Chapter 4	Won	
ADG Excellence in Production Design Awards	February 10, 2024	Excellence in Production Design for a Contemporary Film	Kevin Kavanaugh	Nominated	
People's Choice Awards	February 18, 2024	The Action Movie of the Year	John Wick: Chapter 4	Nominated	
People's Choice Awards	February 18, 2024	The Male Movie Star of the Year	Keanu Reeves	Nominated	
People's Choice Awards	February 18, 2024	The Action Movie Star of the Year	Keanu Reeves	Nominated	
Visual Effects Society Awards	February 21, 2024	Outstanding Supporting Visual Effects in a Photoreal Feature	Janelle Croshaw, Ralla Reina Sparks, Jonathan Rothbart, Javier Roca, Gerd Nefzer	Nominated	
Visual Effects Society Awards	February 21, 2024	Outstanding Created Environment in a Photoreal Feature	Joelle Xin Zhow, Fabrice Vienne, Vignesh Ravi, Laurent Makowski (for Place de L’Étoile)	Nominated	
Visual Effects Society Awards	February 21, 2024	Outstanding Compositing and Lighting in a Feature	Javier Roca, Julien Forest, Thomas Bourdis, Dominik Kirouac (for Apartment Massacre Videogame Style)	Nominated	
Screen Actors Guild Awards	February 24, 2024	Outstanding Performance by a Stunt Ensemble in a Motion Picture	John Wick: Chapter 4	Nominated	
Golden Reel Awards	March 3, 2024	Outstanding Achievement in Sound Editing – Feature Effects / Foley	Paul Soucek, Mark Stoeckinger, Luke Gibleon, Olivia Xiao'ou Zhang, Stephen Robinson, Gael Nicolas, Casey Genton, Nicolas Interlandi	Nominated	
ICG Publicists Awards	March 8, 2024	Maxwell Weinberg Award for Motion Picture Publicity Campaign	John Wick: Chapter 4	Nominated	
Critics' Choice Super Awards	April 4, 2024	Best Action Movie	John Wick: Chapter 4	Won	
Critics' Choice Super Awards	April 4, 2024	Best Actor in an Action Movie	Keanu Reeves	Nominated	
Critics' Choice Super Awards	April 4, 2024	Best Actor in an Action Movie	Donnie Yen	Nominated	
Critics' Choice Super Awards	April 4, 2024	Best Actress in an Action Movie	Rina Sawayama	Nominated	

=== Legacy ===
In 2023, Esquire named the film Reeves's seventh-best, and Comic Book Resources and TheWrap named it that year's best action film. In 2024, Collider named it the 13th-best action film of all time, The Guardian named it Reeves's fourth-best, and GamesRadar+ named it his second-best.

== Future ==
=== Sequel ===
A fifth film was originally intended to be shot back-to-back with Chapter 4. However, by March 2021, after the COVID-19 pandemic affected production on the fourth film, these plans were no longer moving forward, with the Chapter 4's ending being reworked to conclude the series with Wick's fate. Stahelski said that the reason he and Reeves abandoned plans for a sequel was his skepticism over his ability to "deliver two uniquely special experiences". Lionsgate initially demurred at the duo's plan to retire Reeves's character, but eventually acquiesced. Although Stahelski and Reeves insisted that Wick was dead, Lionsgate president Joe Drake later hinted at the possibility of a fifth film due to Chapter 4's "astonishing" box office, while Stahelski stated he was open to a sequel. In May 2023, Lionsgate president Joe Drake confirmed to investors that a fifth film was in development. In December 2024, Reeves expressed interest in a fifth film, but was unsure of the physical challenges the role required. In March 2025, Reeves insisted the character was dead, implying his disinterest in reprising the role again.

On April 1, 2025, Lionsgate chair Adam Fogelson announced at CinemaCon that the studio is developing a fifth film with Stahelski and Reeves.

=== Spin-offs ===
Prior to Lance Reddick's death in March 2023, Reeves, McShane, and Reddick reprised their respective roles as Wick, Winston, and Charon in the film Ballerina (2025), a spin-off to the John Wick films set between the events of Chapter 3 and Chapter 4. Also in development was a spin-off television series entitled The Continental: From the World of John Wick, which featured younger versions of several John Wick characters. Yen has expressed interest in a spin-off centered on Caine, which was eventually announced on May 15, 2024, with filming set to start in Hong Kong in 2025.
