= The Hong Kong Massacre =

2019 video game

- Developer: Vreski AB
- Publishers: Vreski (Microsoft Windows, PlayStation 4); Untold Tales (Nintendo Switch, Xbox)
- Engine: Unity
- Platforms: Microsoft Windows; PlayStation 4; Nintendo Switch; Xbox One; Xbox Series X/S
- Release: Microsoft Windows: January 22, 2019; PlayStation 4: January 29, 2019; Nintendo Switch: December 26, 2020; Xbox One, Series X/S: June 7, 2024
- Genre: Top-down shooter
- Mode: Single-player

The Hong Kong Massacre is a top-down shooter video game developed and published by Swedish studio Vreski for Microsoft Windows and PlayStation 4 in January 2019, and for Nintendo Switch in December 2020. It is the first game to be developed by the studio. Set in 1990s Hong Kong during the British colonial era before the Handover of Hong Kong from Britain to China in 1997, the game follows a former police detective as he sets out to exact revenge against the Triad for the death of his partner.

== Gameplay ==
Inspired by classic action movies such as those of John Woo as well as other video games like Hotline Miami and Max Payne, The Hong Kong Massacre is a top-down shooter in which the player character will die by being shot only once. As a balance measure, the game features a number of special abilities, such as a slow-motion system, a dive/dodge which renders the player invincible for a small amount of time as well as weapon upgrades.

The story of the game is told through a series of conversations and cutscenes, with each of the 35 levels serving as a flashback. At the beginning of each level, the player can choose to equip one of four guns available: pistol, rifle, SMG or shotgun. They must then enter the level and kill all enemies inside it in order to progress to the next level. Visually, the game is reminiscent of Hong Kong action films, including locations such as ruined buildings, kitchens, back alleys, rooftops and abandoned restaurants.

== Development ==
The Hong Kong Massacre was developed by a Swedish firm, Vreski AB.

== Reception ==
Reception

Aggregate scores
Aggregator	Score
Metacritic	PC: 68/100; PS4: 71/100
OpenCritic	27% recommend

Review scores
Publication	Score
Destructoid	6/10
GameSpot	7/10
IGN	7.9/10
Nintendo Life	6/10
Push Square	4/10

According to the review aggregation website Metacritic, The Hong Kong Massacre has received "mixed or average reviews". Fellow review aggregator OpenCritic assessed that the game received weak approval, being recommended by 27% of critics.

Although the game was praised for its intense action and for its emulation of classic action movies, it was criticized for the lack of variety in gameplay and challenges and for quickly becoming repetitive.

In an interview with SlashFilm, director Chad Stahelski said a climactic shootout scene in John Wick: Chapter 4 was directly inspired by The Hong Kong Massacre gameplay.
