= Pearl (soundtrack) =

Pearl (Original Motion Picture Soundtrack)

Film score by Tyler Bates and Timothy Williams
- Released: September 23, 2022
- Recorded: 2022
- Genre: Film score
- Length: 49:32
- Label: A24 Music
- Producer: Tyler Bates; Timothy Williams

Tyler Bates chronology
Day Shift (2022)	Pearl (Original Motion Picture Soundtrack) (2022)	Agent Elvis (2023)

Timothy Williams chronology
Southern Gospel (2021)	Pearl (2022)	She Came from the Woods (2023)

Pearl (Original Motion Picture Soundtrack) is the soundtrack to the 2022 film Pearl, directed by Ti West; a prequel to X and the second installment in the X film series. The film score is composed by Tyler Bates and Timothy Williams and released through A24 Music on September 23, 2022.

== Development ==
When the production of X being interrupted due to the COVID-19 pandemic, West developed the script to Pearl and sent the complete draft to Bates, which he liked it and eventually expressed his involvement on scoring the film. By the time Bates finished the score for X, A24 told West and the other crew members that they planned to release two films within a short span of time, which meant that the score had to be written, composed and produced within two months.

Bates then told West about roping his orchestrator Timothy Williams as a co-composer, so that he could deliver the score on time. Greg Prechel composed additional music and arranged instruments. Both of them immediately worked on the film's score after the March 2022 SXSW Film Festival.

Bates and Williams shared a liking of film scores from the classical Hollywood cinema mostly from Bernard Herrmann, John Barry, Henry Mancini, Ennio Morricone and Maurice Jarre. In contrast to X, the duo wanted to produce a stylistically classical approach from that period, so that people could conceive it as a classic film over a slasher-horror film.

== Reception ==
A. O. Scott of The New York Times described it as "frenzied and portentous". RogerEbert.com called it as a "gorgeous wall-to-wall score [...] that kicks off with a sumptuous main theme". Joshua Rothkopf of Entertainment Weekly called it as a "churning wall-to-wall orchestral score" that was "intentionally emotive". David Rooney of The Hollywood Reporter wrote "the big surging sounds of Tyler Bates and Tim Williams’ old-school orchestral score signal high drama and danger from the start." Clarrise Loughrey of The Independent described it as "winningly romantic". Kim Newman of Empire summarized "The almost-continuous orchestral score by Tyler Bates and Timothy Williams is a romantic counterpoint to the onscreen action." Shakyl Lambert of CGMagazine wrote "the score feels ripped straight out of an epic before dropping the pretense to something way more creepy."

== Track listing ==
Pearl (Original Motion Picture Soundtrack) track listing
No.	Title	Length
1.	"Pearl Main Titles"	2:22
2.	"One Day"	3:15
3.	"Go Fetch Your Father"	3:24
4.	"Ride Home"	2:31
5.	"Dancing with Scarecrows"	2:28
6.	"Papa"	2:40
7.	"Bless Us, Oh Lord"	3:12
8.	"The Projectionist"	3:05
9.	"The Arts in Europe"	2:27
10.	"Alligator Egg"	2:07
11.	"The Whole World Is Gonna Know My Name"	3:17
12.	"What About Your Dog?"	3:37
13.	"The Red Dress"	2:12
14.	"Hot-House Rag"	1:38
15.	"We're Looking for Something Different"	2:17
16.	"I Should Probably Get Going"	2:07
17.	"A Bicycle and an Axe"	1:45
18.	"The Tableau"	2:23
19.	"I'm So Happy You're Home"	2:45
Total length:		49:32

== Accolades ==
Accolades for Pearl (Original Motion Picture Soundtrack)
Award	Date of ceremony	Category	Recipient(s)	Result	Ref.
International Film Music Critics Association	February 23, 2023	Best Original Score for a Fantasy/Science Fiction/Horror Film	Tyler Bates and Tim Williams	Nominated	
Fangoria Chainsaw Awards	May 21, 2023	Best Score	Tyler Bates and Tim Williams	Nominated	
