= John Wick: Chapter 3 – Parabellum =

2019 American film directed by Chad Stahelski

- Theatrical release poster
- Directed by: Chad Stahelski
- Screenplay by: Derek Kolstad; Shay Hatten; Chris Collins; Marc Abrams
- Story by: Derek Kolstad
- Based on: Characters by Derek Kolstad
- Produced by: Basil Iwanyk; Erica Lee
- Starring: Keanu Reeves; Halle Berry; Laurence Fishburne; Mark Dacascos; Asia Kate Dillon; Lance Reddick; Anjelica Huston; Ian McShane
- Cinematography: Dan Laustsen
- Edited by: Evan Schiff
- Music by: Tyler Bates; Joel J. Richard
- Production companies: Summit Entertainment; Thunder Road Films; 87Eleven Entertainment
- Distributed by: Lionsgate
- Release dates: May 9, 2019 (Regal Union Square); May 17, 2019 (United States)
- Running time: 131 minutes
- Country: United States
- Language: English
- Budget: $75 million
- Box office: $328.3 million

John Wick: Chapter 3 – Parabellum is a 2019 American action thriller film directed by Chad Stahelski from a screenplay by Derek Kolstad, Shay Hatten, Chris Collins, and Marc Abrams, based on a story by Kolstad. The film is the direct sequel to John Wick: Chapter 2 (2017) and the third installment in the John Wick film series, starring Keanu Reeves as the title character. In addition to Reeves, Laurence Fishburne, Lance Reddick, and Ian McShane reprise their supporting roles from previous films, with Halle Berry, Mark Dacascos, Asia Kate Dillon, and Anjelica Huston appearing in new roles. The film takes place immediately after Chapter 2 and centers on John Wick going on the run from a legion of hitmen after a bounty is placed for his murder.

In October 2016, Stahelski stated a third John Wick film was in the works; this was formally announced in June 2017, after the returns of Reeves and Kolstad were confirmed, followed by Stahelski's return in January 2018. Much of the returning cast and crew was confirmed that following month, with new members joining that May. Principal photography began that month and lasted through that November, with filming locations including New York City and Casablanca.

John Wick: Chapter 3 – Parabellum had its premiere at the Regal Union Square in New York City on May 9, 2019, and was released in the United States on May 17, by Lionsgate. It received highly positive reviews from critics, with praise for the action sequences, visual style, and Reeves's performance. The film was also a commercial success, grossing over $328 million worldwide on a budget of $75 million. A sequel, John Wick: Chapter 4, was released in March 2023, and a spin-off film, Ballerina, was released in June 2025.

== Plot ==
John Wick is on the run in Manhattan after he was labeled "excommunicado" for the killing of High Table crime lord Santino D'Antonio on Continental grounds. (Note: As depicted in John Wick: Chapter 2 (2017)) At the New York Public Library, John retrieves a marker medallion and a rosary. He is injured in a fight with another hitman, Ernest, and seeks medical treatment from an underworld doctor. His excommunicado status activates before the doctor can finish, forcing John to complete the suturing himself. Upon leaving, he is quickly pursued by various gangs of assassins, all of whom he kills.

John meets with The Director, the head of the Ruska Roma crime syndicate, to whom he presents a rosary and demands safe passage to Casablanca. As John was once a member, the Director reluctantly agrees. Meanwhile, a High Table Adjudicator meets with New York Continental manager Winston Scott and the Bowery King, notifying them that they both have seven days to resign from their positions as a consequence of helping John. The Adjudicator enlists Zero, a Japanese assassin, and orders him to stab the Director through both of her hands as penance for aiding John. In Casablanca, John meets Sofia Al-Azwar, his former friend who is now the manager of the Moroccan Continental.

John presents the marker, which binds Sofia to repay a debt to John (John had previously rescued Sofia's daughter and placed her in hiding). John demands to be directed to the Elder, the only person above the High Table, who alone can rescind John's excommunicado status. Sofia begrudgingly takes John to Berrada, her former boss, who tells John he may find the Elder only by wandering through the desert until he can no longer walk. When Sofia refuses to give Berrada one of her trained Belgian Malinois in return for his help, he shoots the dog, but hits its bulletproof vest. Even though John prevents Sofia from killing Berrada, they fight their way out of the kasbah and drive into the desert, where she leaves John.

Seven days later, the Adjudicator and Zero confront the Bowery King, who refuses to abdicate his position. In response, Zero's students slaughter the Bowery King's men while Zero slashes the Bowery King seven times with a wakizashi. Meanwhile, John collapses in the desert and is brought to the Elder.

John states that he wants to live to keep the memory of the love he once had with his late wife. (Note: As depicted in John Wick (2014)) The Elder agrees to forgive John under the condition of killing Winston and subservience to the High Table for the remainder of his life. To show his fealty, John severs his ring finger and gives his wedding ring to The Elder.

Upon returning to New York, John is attacked by Zero and his students before reaching the protection of the Continental. The Adjudicator arrives, but Winston refuses to abdicate, and John refuses to kill him, leading the Adjudicator to revoke the Continental's neutral status and send both Zero and an army of heavily armed High Table enforcers to kill John and Winston. Winston provides John with weapons and the assistance of concierge Charon and his staff. After killing all the enforcers, Zero and his students ambush John; John proceeds to kill all but two. Zero battles John, but is eventually defeated and left to die. On the roof of the Continental, the Adjudicator agrees to a parley with Winston, who offers allegiance to the High Table.

John arrives; Winston shoots him, and he falls to the street below. Winston reassumes his position, and the severely injured John is secretly delivered to the Bowery King in an underground bunker; the two agree to join forces against the High Table.

== Cast ==
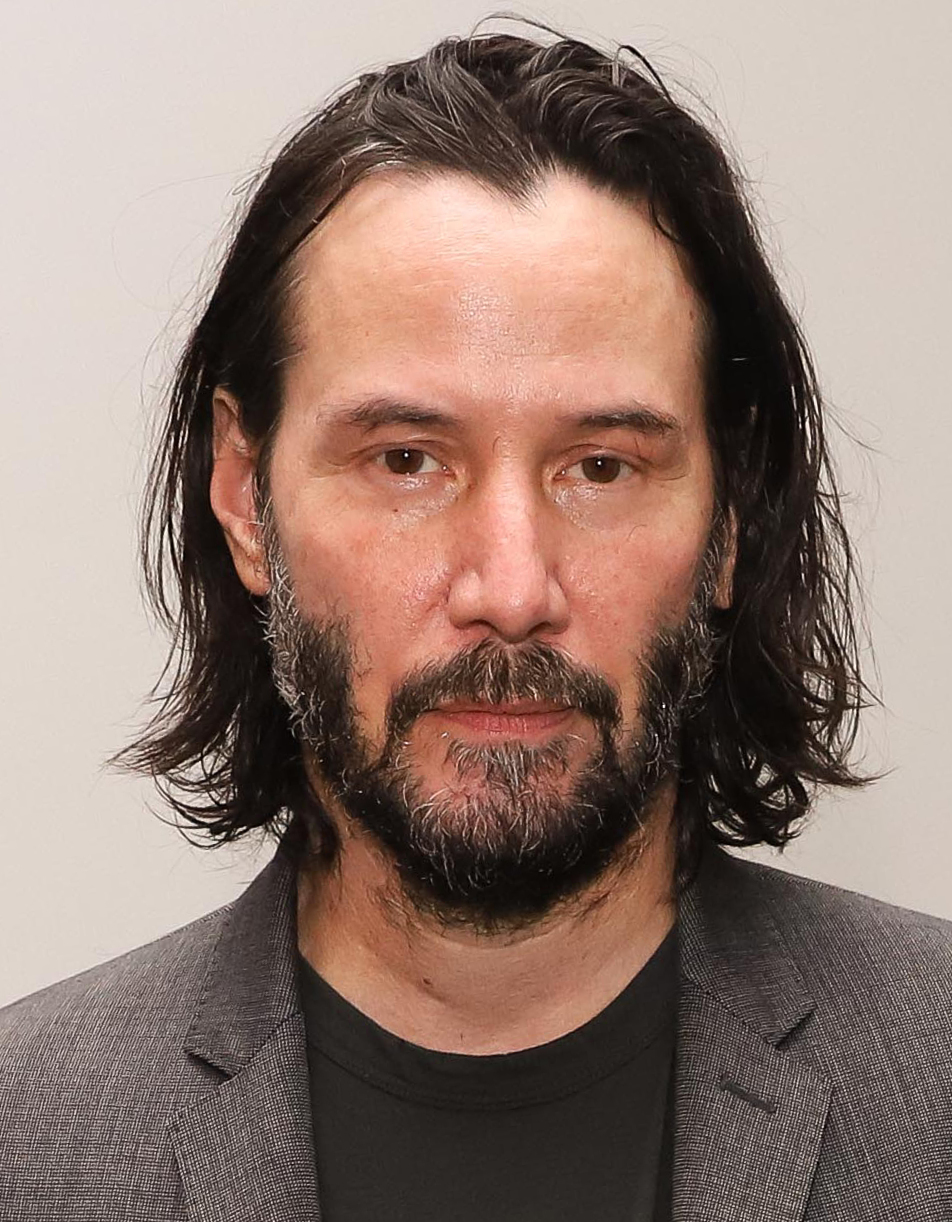
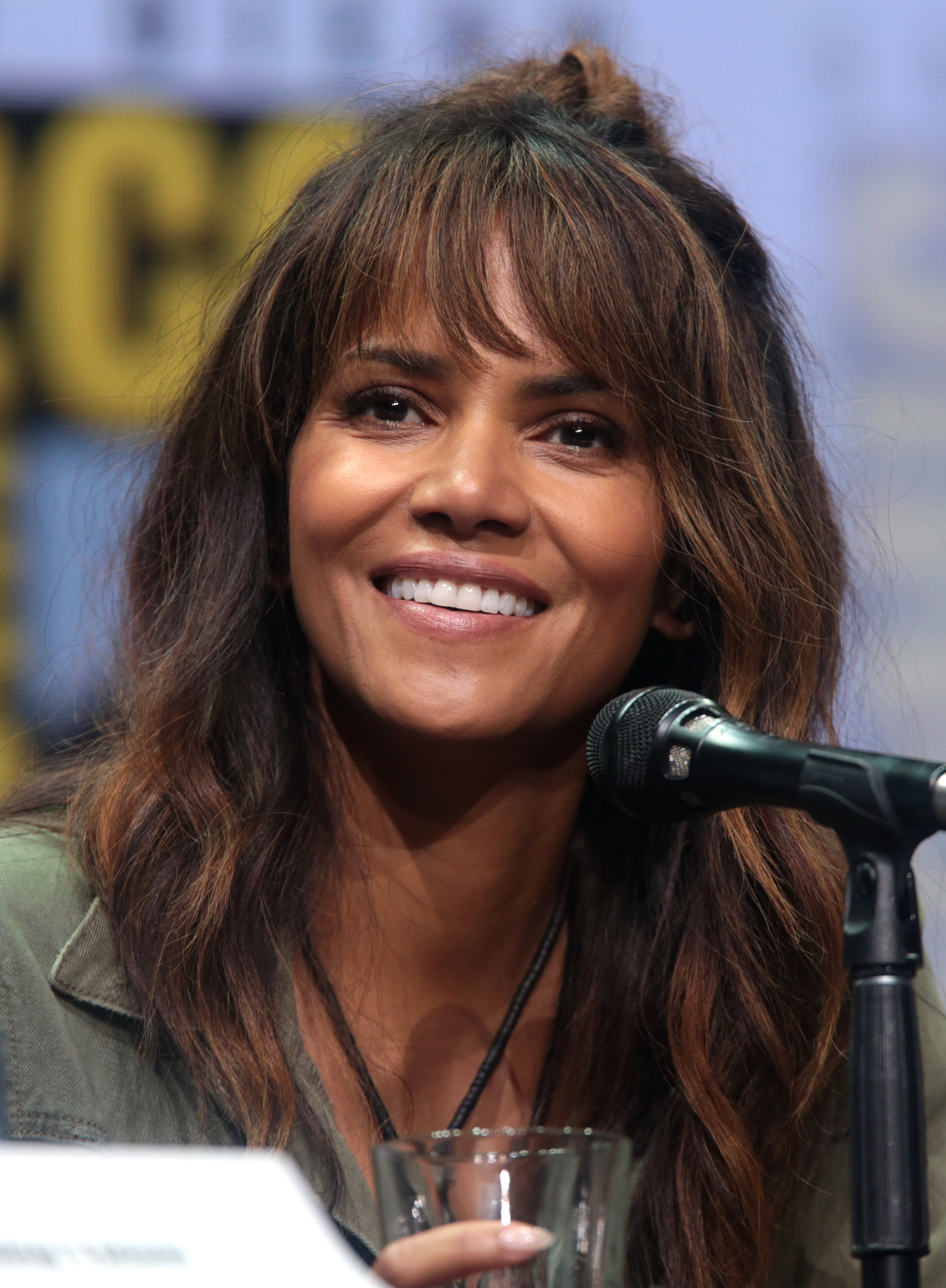
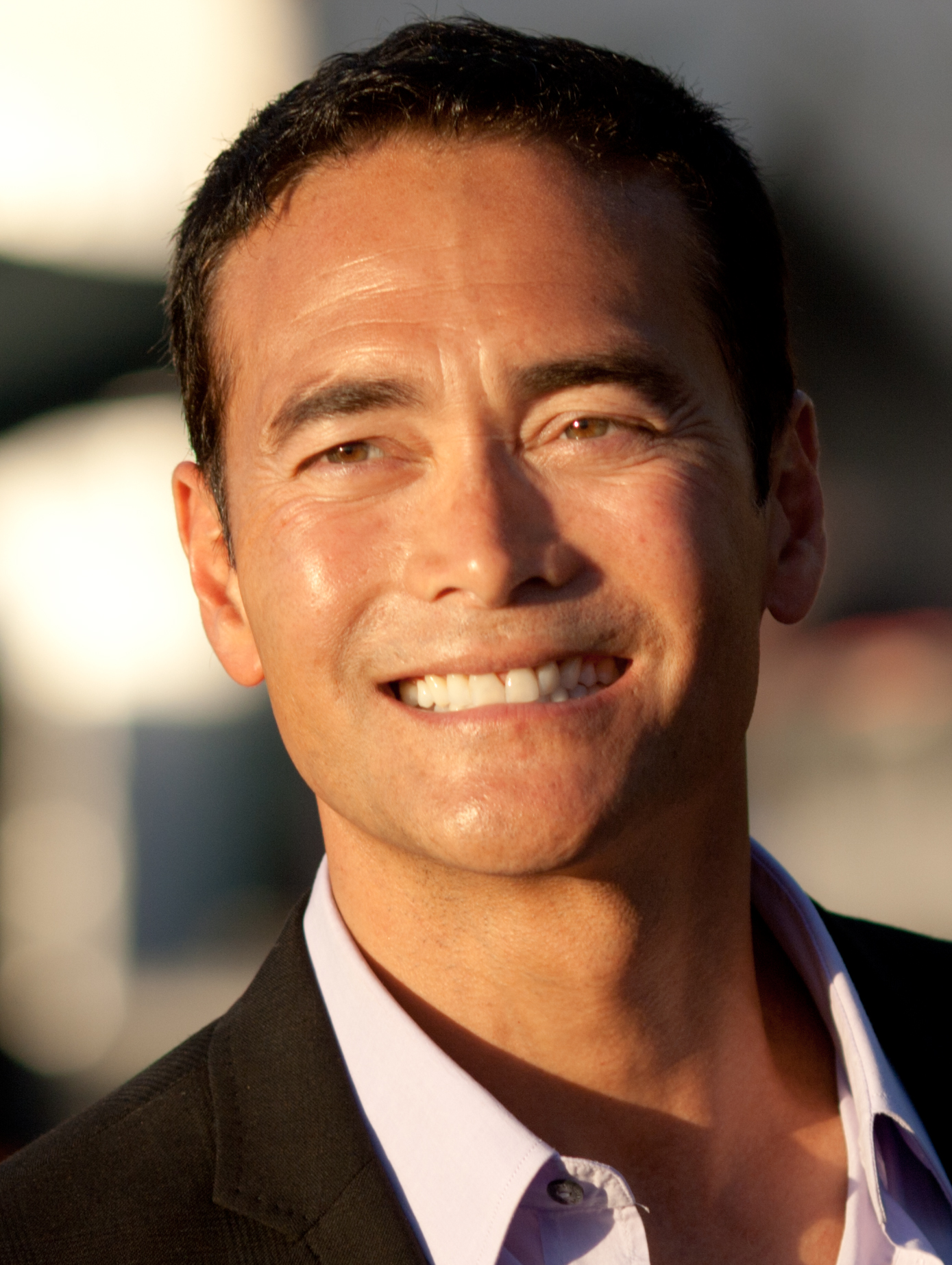
Keanu Reeves (pictured in 2019), Halle Berry (2017), and Mark Dacascos (2011)
- Keanu Reeves as John Wick, a former assassin on the run from the High Table
- Halle Berry as Sofia Al-Azwar, an ex-assassin, a former friend of John, and the manager of the Continental Hotel in Casablanca
- Laurence Fishburne as "The Bowery King", the head of the Soup Kitchen intelligence network in New York City
- Mark Dacascos as Zero, an assassin employed by the Adjudicator to eliminate John
- Asia Kate Dillon as "The Adjudicator", an agent of the High Table sent to punish John and those who assist him
- Lance Reddick as Charon, the concierge at the Continental Hotel in New York.
- Anjelica Huston as "The Director", the leader of the Ruska Roma
- Ian McShane as Winston Scott, the enigmatic manager of the New York Continental and friend of John
- Tobias Segal as Earl
- Saïd Taghmaoui as "The Elder"
- Jerome Flynn as Berrada
- Randall Duk Kim as "The Doctor"
- Margaret Daly as Operator
- Robin Lord Taylor as "Administrator"
- Susan Blommaert as "Librarian"
- Jason Mantzoukas as "Tick Tock Man", one of the Bowery King's men
- Cecep Arif Rahman as Shinobi #1, one of Zero's pupils
- Yayan Ruhian as Shinobi #2, another of Zero's pupils
- Unity Phelan as Rooney, a ballerina training to become an assassin in the Ruska Roma
- Roger Yuan as Huang, a Triad gang assassin (uncredited)
- Tiger Chen as Triad (uncredited)
- Boban Marjanović as Ernest
- Aïssam Bouali as Yassin, the concierge at the Continental Hotel in Casablanca

== Production ==
In October 2016, Chad Stahelski, who made his directorial debut with John Wick and served as Reeves' Matrix stunt double, stated that a third film in the John Wick series was in the works, and in June 2017, it was reported that Derek Kolstad, who wrote the two prior films, would return to write the screenplay. In January 2018, it was reported that Stahelski would return to direct.

According to Reeves, the film's title was taken from the famous 4th-century Roman military quote "Si vis pacem, para bellum", which means, "If you want peace, prepare for war." In an interview with the New York Times, McShane said that the film would be big and good and that nothing is the same while also hinting that part of the action could be the High Table's payback not only on Wick but also on his close friend Winston.

=== Casting ===
In January 2018, it was reported that Hiroyuki Sanada was in talks to join the cast. Sanada was originally going to be Zero, but suffered a torn Achilles tendon, and the role was given to Mark Dacascos. Later, it was revealed that Ian McShane, Laurence Fishburne, and Lance Reddick would reprise their roles from previous John Wick films. In May 2018, Halle Berry, Anjelica Huston, Asia Kate Dillon, Mark Dacascos, Jason Mantzoukas, Yayan Ruhian, Cecep Arif Rahman, and Tiger Chen joined the cast. In November 2018, Said Taghmaoui confirmed his involvement in the film.

=== Filming ===
Principal photography began May 5, 2018, in New York City, along with additional filming locations in Casablanca. Principal photography lasted until November 17, 2018. Youssef Louchi served as location manager on the production. Cinematographer Dan Laustsen was asked about how challenging it was to use as many extended fight scene takes as possible while filming the high action screenplay. He stated, "Of course it is [a challenge], because all the fights—Chad [Stahelski] is doing most of the fights himself. We play that as wide as we can. Because that way we see it's him. We do that a lot, we try to play it as wide as we can and do long shots. Of course, because Chad has a background from the stunt world he knows exactly how to block this kind of stuff. I'm not the best stunt person in the world, but I'm learning." In an interview with Jimmy Fallon, Halle Berry said that she "broke three ribs in rehearsal."

The action scene with a hitman named Ernest, played by NBA basketball player Boban Marjanović, was inspired by the Bruce Lee film Game of Death (1972), where Lee fights NBA basketball player Kareem Abdul-Jabbar. Unlike most of the other stunt scenes, Ernest has a few lines bantering with John Wick, but he still loses.

=== Special effects ===
The visual effects are provided by Method Studios, Image Engine, and Soho VFX.

== Music ==
Tyler Bates and Joel J. Richard return to score the film. The soundtrack was released by Varèse Sarabande.

The theme song for the film is "Bullet Holes" by English rock band Bush. While Tyler Bates was writing music with the band, he decided that the song would be perfect for the film, and sent it to Chad Stahelski. The song "Ninja Re Bang Bang" by Japanese artist Kyary Pamyu Pamyu is also featured in the film.

== Marketing ==
The studio spent an estimated $48 million on prints and advertisements promoting the film.

== Release ==
=== Theatrical ===
Parabellum premiered in Brooklyn, New York on May 9, 2019. The film was theatrically released in the United States on May 17, 2019, by Lionsgate.

=== Home media ===
The film was released on Digital HD on August 23, 2019, and was released on DVD, Blu-ray, and Ultra HD Blu-ray on September 10, 2019, by Lionsgate Home Entertainment.

== Reception ==
=== Box office ===
John Wick: Chapter 3 – Parabellum grossed $171 million in the United States and Canada, and $157.3 million in other territories, for a worldwide total of $328.3 million. Deadline Hollywood calculated the net profit of the film to be $89 million, when factoring together all expenses and revenues.

In the United States and Canada, Parabellum was released alongside A Dog's Journey and The Sun Is Also a Star and was initially projected to gross $30–40 million from 3,850 theaters in its opening weekend. The film made $5.9 million from Thursday night previews, more than the total of the Thursday night previews for the previous two films ($950,000 and $2.2 million). It then made $22.7 million on its first day (including previews), increasing its projected gross to $56 million. It went on to debut at $57 million, becoming the first film to dethrone Avengers: Endgame atop the box office. It was the best opening of the series, and more than the first film made during its entire theatrical run ($43 million). In its second weekend the film made $24.4 million, finishing second behind newcomer Aladdin. It then earned $11.1 million in its third weekend and $6.4 million in its fourth.

=== Critical response ===
On review aggregator Rotten Tomatoes, the film holds an approval rating of 89%, with an average rating of 7.5/10, based on 359 reviews. The website's critical consensus reads, "John Wick: Chapter 3 – Parabellum reloads for another hard-hitting round of the brilliantly choreographed, over-the-top action that fans of the franchise demand." On Metacritic, the film has a weighted average score of 73 out of 100, based on 50 critics, indicating "generally favorable" reviews. Audiences polled by CinemaScore gave the film an average grade of "A−" on an A+ to F scale, the same as its predecessor, while those at PostTrak gave it 4.5 out of 5 stars and a "definite recommend" of 75%. Rotten Tomatoes also ranked it at No. 2 on its list of "The Best Action Movies of 2019".

Peter Sobczynski of RogerEbert.com gave the film 4 out of 4 stars, calling it "a work of pop cinema so blissfully, albeit brutally, entertaining that you come out of it feeling even more resentful of its multiplex neighbors for not making a similar effort." Chris Nashawaty of Entertainment Weekly gave the film a grade of "A−", writing that "as gorgeously choreographed, gratuitously violent action movies go, it's high art". Wendy Ide of The Observer gave the film 4 out of 5 stars, calling it "a flying kick to the senses" and writing that "The spectacular third installment in Keanu Reeves's fighting franchise overwhelms with opulent martial arts set pieces".

=== Accolades ===
Award	Category	Recipient	Result
Art Directors Guild Awards	Best Contemporary Film	Kevin Kavanaugh	Nominated
Austin Film Critics Association	Best Stunts	John Wick: Chapter 3 – Parabellum	Won
BMI Awards	BMI Film Music	Joel J. Richard (composer); Tyler Bates (composer)	Won
British Film Designers Guild Awards	International Studio Feature Film - Contemporary	Kevin Kavanaugh (Production Designer); Ian Bailie (Supervising Art Director); Chris Shriver (Supervising Art Director); David Schlesinger (Set Decorator); Letizia Santucci (Set Decorator)	Won
Critics Choice Movie Awards	Best Action Movie	John Wick: Chapter 3 – Parabellum	Nominated
Golden Raspberry Awards	Razzie Redeemer Award	Keanu Reeves	Nominated
Golden Schmoes Awards	Favorite Celebrity of the Year	Keanu Reeves	Won
Golden Schmoes Awards	Coolest Character of the Year	John Wick	Runner-up
Golden Schmoes Awards	Favorite Movie Poster of the Year nom	John Wick: Chapter 3 – Parabellum	Nominated
Golden Schmoes Awards	Best Action Sequence of the Year	Knife Fight in Shop	Runner-up
Golden Schmoes Awards	Best Action Sequence of the Year	Final Fight	Nominated
Golden Tomato Awards	Best-Reviewed Action & Adventure Movies	John Wick: Chapter 3 – Parabellum	Won
Golden Tomato Awards	Fan Favorite Movies	John Wick: Chapter 3 – Parabellum	7th place
Golden Tomato Awards	Golden Year Award	Keanu Reeves	Won
Golden Tomato Awards	Fan Favorite Actors	Keanu Reeves	Nominated
Golden Trailer Awards	Best of Show	John Wick: Chapter 3 – Parabellum	Won
Golden Trailer Awards	Best Action	John Wick: Chapter 3 – Parabellum	Won
Golden Trailer Awards	Best Summer 2019 Blockbuster Trailer	John Wick: Chapter 3 – Parabellum	Won
Golden Trailer Awards	Best Action Poster	John Wick: Chapter 3 – Parabellum	Won
Golden Trailer Awards	Best Teaser Poster	John Wick: Chapter 3 – Parabellum	Won
Golden Trailer Awards	Best Action TV Spot (for a Feature Film)	John Wick: Chapter 3 – Parabellum	Nominated
Golden Trailer Awards	Best Home Ent Action	John Wick: Chapter 3 – Parabellum	Nominated
Hollywood Critics Association Awards	Best Stunt Work	John Wick: Chapter 3 – Parabellum	Won
Hollywood Critics Association Awards	Best Action/War Film	John Wick: Chapter 3 – Parabellum	Nominated
Houston Film Critics Society	Best Stunt Coordination Team	John Wick: Chapter 3 – Parabellum	Won
Houston Film Critics Society	Best Movie Poster Art	John Wick: Chapter 3 – Parabellum	Nominated
IGN Awards	Best Action Movie	John Wick: Chapter 3 – Parabellum	Won
IGN Awards	People's Choice Winner Best Action Movie	John Wick: Chapter 3 – Parabellum	Won
Make-Up Artists and Hair Stylists Guild	Best Contemporary Hair Styling - Feature-Length Motion Picture	Kerrie Smith; Therese Ducey	Nominated
Make-Up Artists and Hair Stylists Guild	Best Contemporary Make-Up - Feature-Length Motion Picture	Stephen Kelley; Anna Stachow; Jacenda Burkett	Nominated
Motion Picture Sound Editors	Feature Film - Sound Effects / Foley	Mark P. Stoeckinger (supervising sound editor); Alan Rankin (sound designer); Martyn Zub (sound designer); Luke Gibleon (sound designer); Dan O'Connell (foley artist); John T. Cucci (foley artist)	Nominated
Online Film Critics Society	Best Stunt Coordination	John Wick: Chapter 3 – Parabellum	Won
People's Choice Awards	Favorite Movie of 2019	John Wick: Chapter 3 – Parabellum	Nominated
People's Choice Awards	Favorite Action Movie of 2019	John Wick: Chapter 3 – Parabellum	Nominated
People's Choice Awards	Favorite Male Movie Star of 2019	Keanu Reeves	Nominated
People's Choice Awards	Favorite Action Movie Star of 2019	Keanu Reeves	Nominated
People's Choice Awards	Favorite Action Movie Star of 2019	Halle Berry	Nominated
Saturn Awards	Best Action or Adventure Film	John Wick: Chapter 3 – Parabellum	Nominated
Saturn Awards	Best Actor	Keanu Reeves	Nominated
Saturn Awards	Best Editing	Evan Schiff	Nominated
Seattle Film Critics Society	Best Action Choreography	John Wick: Chapter 3 – Parabellum	Won
St. Louis Film Critics Association	Best Action Film	John Wick: Chapter 3 – Parabellum	Nominated
Taurus World Stunt Awards	Best Fight	John Wick: Chapter 3 – Parabellum	Nominated
Taurus World Stunt Awards	Best Stunt Coordinator And/Or 2nd Unit Director	John Wick: Chapter 3 – Parabellum	Won

== Follow-ups ==
=== Sequel ===
On May 20, 2019, following the third film's successful debut, John Wick: Chapter 4 was announced and given a May 21, 2021 release date. This film was planned to be released alongside The Matrix Resurrections, also starring Keanu Reeves. However, on May 1, 2020, the film was delayed to March 24, 2023, due to the COVID-19 pandemic.

=== Spin-off ===
In October 2018, Lionsgate Films acquired Shay Hatten's action thriller Ballerina, with Thunder Road Films producing the film and Hatten rewriting the script to be a part of the John Wick franchise, for which the proof-of-concept short film pitch, described as "female John Wick", was previously uploaded to YouTube in September 2017, with the film's intended protagonist, a tattooed ballerina and would-be assassin named Rooney, making her cinematic debut in Parabellum, portrayed by Unity Phelan. In October 2019, Len Wiseman was hired to direct the film. In October 2021, Ana de Armas entered talks to star in the lead role, replacing Phelan. On November 7, 2022, principal photography on the film, starring de Armas, began in Prague, with Ian McShane and Keanu Reeves announced to be reprising their respective roles from previous films the following day. The film was released on June 6, 2025.
