= John Wick: Chapter 2 =

2017 American film directed by Chad Stahelski

- Theatrical release poster
- Directed by: Chad Stahelski
- Written by: Derek Kolstad
- Based on: Characters by Derek Kolstad
- Produced by: Basil Iwanyk; Erica Lee
- Starring: Keanu Reeves; Common; Laurence Fishburne; Riccardo Scamarcio; Claudia Gerini; Ruby Rose; Lance Reddick; Peter Stormare; Bridget Moynahan; Franco Nero; John Leguizamo; Ian McShane
- Cinematography: Dan Laustsen
- Edited by: Evan Schiff
- Music by: Tyler Bates; Joel J. Richard
- Production companies: Summit Entertainment; Thunder Road Pictures; TIK Films; 87Eleven Entertainment
- Distributed by: Lionsgate
- Release date: February 10, 2017
- Running time: 122 minutes
- Country: United States
- Language: English
- Budget: $40 million
- Box office: $174.3 million

John Wick: Chapter 2 is a 2017 American action thriller film directed by Chad Stahelski and written by Derek Kolstad. As the direct sequel to John Wick (2014), it is the second installment in the John Wick film series, starring Keanu Reeves as the title character. In addition to Reeves, Lance Reddick, Bridget Moynahan, John Leguizamo, and Ian McShane reprise their supporting roles from the first film while Common, Laurence Fishburne, Riccardo Scamarcio, Ruby Rose, Peter Stormare, and Franco Nero appear in new roles. The film's plot follows retired hitman John Wick (Reeves) as he is forced back into his old life to fulfill a blood oath to crime lord Santino D'Antonio (Scamarcio).

Following the box office success of the previous film, Stahelski and the first film's uncredited co-director David Leitch said a sequel film began development in February 2015. Later that same month, Jon Feltheimer confirmed plans for additional John Wick properties to create a media franchise, and announced the return of Kolstad as the sequel's screenwriter. Principal photography began in October 2015 and lasted until early that following year, with filming taking place in Montreal, New Jersey, New York City, and Rome.

John Wick: Chapter 2 had its premiere at the Arclight Hollywood in Los Angeles on January 30, 2017, and was released by Lionsgate in the United States on February 10. The film received acclaim from critics, with praise for the action sequences, direction, editing, visual style, and the performances of the cast, particularly Reeves. It was a commercial success, grossing over $174 million worldwide on a budget of $40 million. A sequel, John Wick: Chapter 3 – Parabellum, was released in May 2019.

== Plot ==
John Wick infiltrates a smuggling compound run by Abram Tarasov, who is highly strung following the recent deaths of his nephew Iosef and brother Viggo at John's hands. (Note: As depicted in John Wick (2014)) There, he recovers his stolen Boss 429 Mustang and defeats all of Abram's men in a violent rampage, but spares Abram himself under the promise of peace. Returning home, he sends his Mustang off to be repaired by Aurelio and attempts to restart his life of quietude.

That night, John is visited by the Camorra crime boss Santino D'Antonio, who, given John's brief return from retirement, is now seeking his services. John is bound by a "marker" (a medallion symbolizing a blood oath) with Santino, who had helped him complete the "impossible task" that allowed him to retire and marry Helen. Nevertheless, John refuses, prompting Santino to destroy his house with a grenade launcher. After surviving Santino's attack, he travels to the Continental Hotel in New York City, where Winston reminds him that the underworld has two unbreakable rules: no "conducting business" (i.e., assassinations) on Continental grounds, and honoring the marker. To avoid a death sentence, John reluctantly accepts Santino's marker and is tasked with assassinating Santino's sister Gianna, allowing Santino to claim her seat at the "High Table," a council of twelve high-level crime bosses in the underworld. Santino sends Ares, his mute bodyguard, to observe John's mission.

In Rome, Italy, John makes his way through Gianna's coronation and finds her in her dressing room. Faced with certain death, she chooses to slit her wrists, after which he shoots her in the head to end her suffering and fulfill Santino's marker. While leaving the site, John is attacked by Gianna's bodyguard, Cassian, forcing him to flee to the nearby catacombs, where he is double-crossed by Ares, who intends to kill him to tie up loose ends on Santino's behalf. After killing most of Ares' henchmen, Cassian again pursues John, with the ensuing fight leading them into the Rome Continental, where they are stopped from "conducting business". John explains that he was forced to kill Gianna due to her brother's marker. Cassian, while understanding, tells him that he cannot let the assassination go unpunished, but promises to grant him a quick death.

The Rome Continental's manager, Julius, gives John safe passage back to New York. Santino has opened a contract to have John assassinated, ostensibly to avenge his sister's death. As John fights off numerous assassins, Winston visits Santino and confirms the marker's fulfillment, thus freeing John from being unable to defy or harm Santino.

In the New York City Subway, John encounters Cassian, and the two men engage in a grueling melee that ends with Cassian being stabbed in the aorta and left for dead. Now severely injured, John seeks aid from an underground crime boss known as the "Bowery King." Intrigued by his intent to kill a member of the High Table, the Bowery King sportingly gives John a Kimber M1911 pistol with seven bullets—one for each million of the contract. He also directs him to an art museum, where Santino holds a gala. John attacks the museum and kills all of Santino's subordinates, including Ares, whose actions buy time for Santino to escape to the Continental, where he boasts about remaining in sanctuary indefinitely. Despite Winston's calls for restraint, John executes Santino in the Continental lounge.

The next day, Winston meets with John and explains that the Camorra has doubled the bounty on John's head, offering it globally. Further, for "conducting business" on Continental grounds, per the High Table's rules, Winston is forced to declare John "excommunicado," terminating his privileges and access to underworld resources. However, due to their friendship, Winston delays the excommunicado status by one hour and provides him with a marker for future use. Before leaving, John tells Winston to warn every High Table assassin that he will kill everyone who tries to hunt him down. As John departs, Winston formally initiates the excommunicado contract process, setting it to go live in one hour. Increasingly tense, John begins running as phones around him start to ring.

== Cast ==
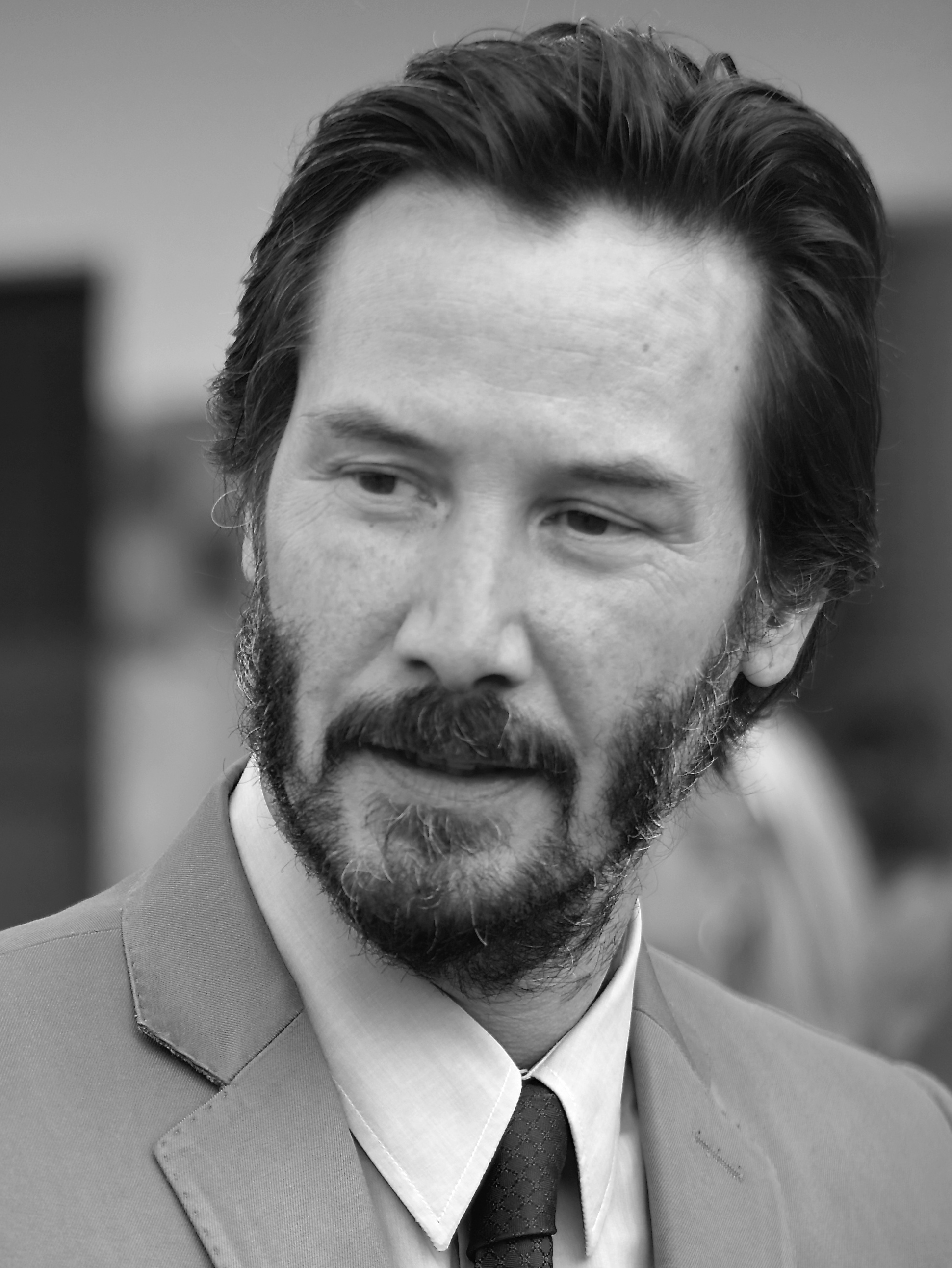
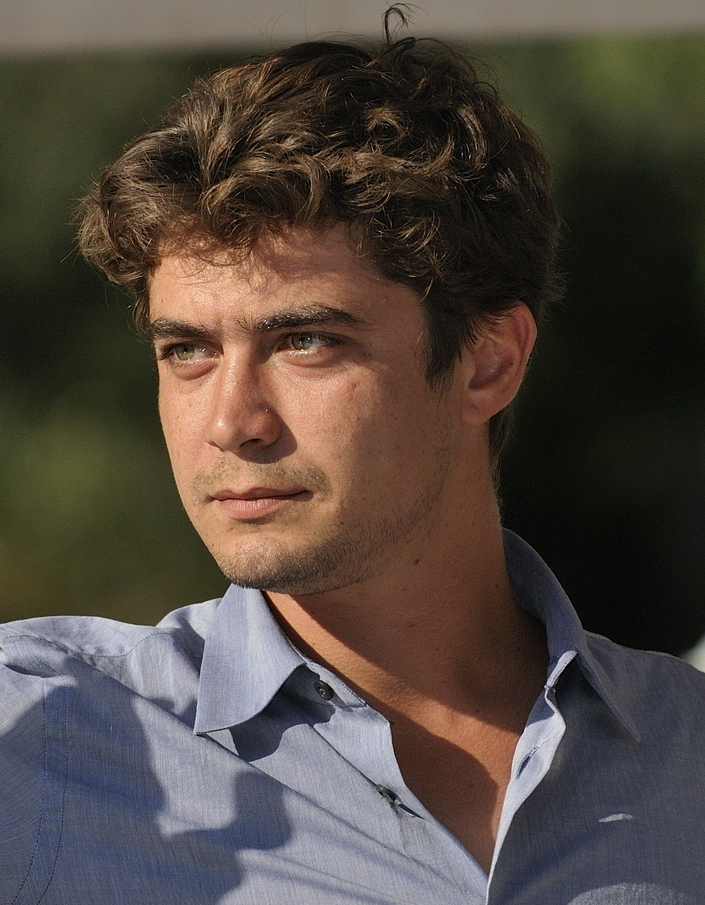
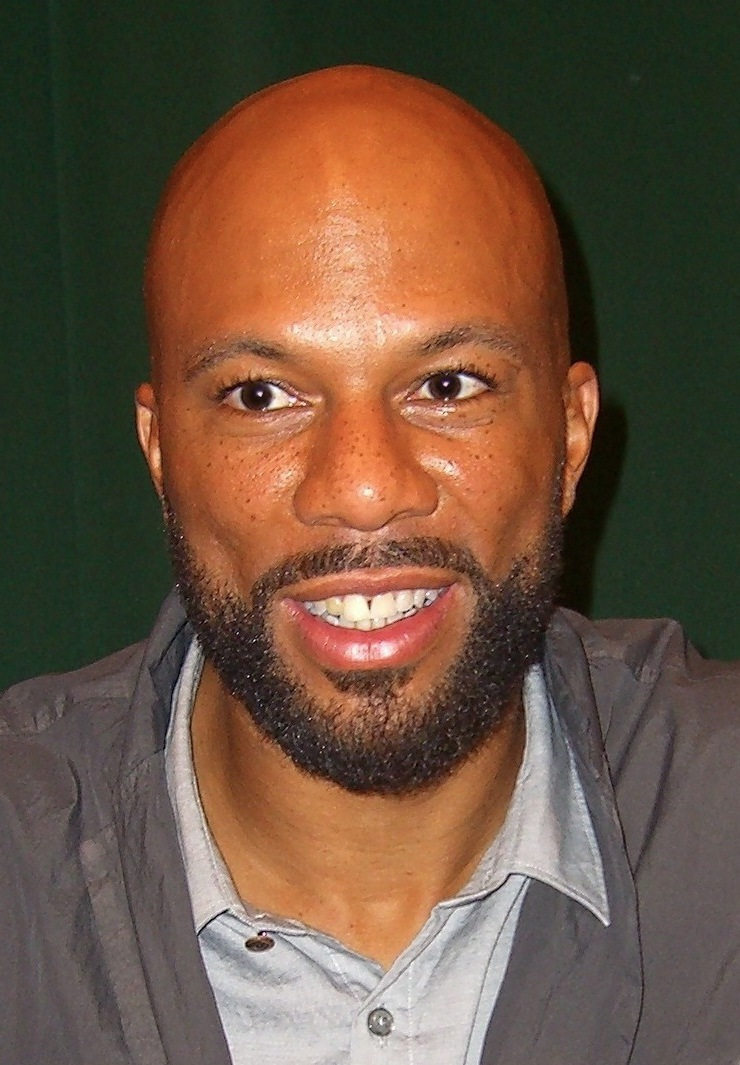
Keanu Reeves (pictured in 2015), Riccardo Scamarcio (2009), and Common (2011)
- Keanu Reeves as John Wick:
  A legendary hitman who comes out of retirement after Russian mobsters break into his house, kill his puppy, and steal his car. After wiping out his offenders, he is wholly thrust back into the criminal underworld in order to fulfill a blood oath to the man who enabled his retirement.
- Riccardo Scamarcio as Santino D'Antonio:
  An Italian crime boss who enabled John's retirement by helping him complete an "impossible task" in exchange for John swearing by a blood oath medallion known as a "marker." Invoking the marker, he seeks to have his sister assassinated by John, with the intention of usurping her position and then eliminating John to tie up loose ends.
- Claudia Gerini as Gianna D'Antonio:
  An Italian crime boss who inherited her father's empire and status as a member of the prestigious "High Table." She is the sister of Santino and an old friend of John.
- Ian McShane as Winston Scott:
  The owner and manager of the Continental Hotel in New York City. He is a powerful underworld figure and a close friend of John, for whom he acts as a father figure.
- Ruby Rose as Ares:
  A mute assassin who serves as Santino's personal bodyguard.
- Common as Cassian:
  An assassin who serves as Gianna's personal bodyguard.
- Laurence Fishburne as the "Bowery King":
  An underground crime lord of New York City and an enemy-turned-acquaintance of John.
- Lance Reddick as Charon:
  The concierge at Winston's Continental Hotel in New York City and an acquaintance of John.
- Peter Stormare as Abram Tarasov:
  A Russian crime boss in New York City and the last of the Tarasov family's major figures. He is the uncle of Iosef Tarasov and the brother of Viggo Tarasov, both of whom were killed by John in the events of the first film.
- Franco Nero as Julius:
  The owner and manager of the Continental Hotel in Rome.
- John Leguizamo as Aurelio:
  The owner of a high-end chop shop and an old friend of John.
- Bridget Moynahan as Helen Wick:
  John's late wife, who succumbed to a terminal illness sometime before the end of John's retirement.
- Thomas Sadoski as Jimmy:
  A police officer in New York City and an acquaintance of John.
- Peter Serafinowicz as "The Sommelier":
  A weapons supplier at the Continental Hotel.
- Luca Mosca as "The Tailor":
  A tailor and armorer at the Continental Hotel.
- Youma Diakite as Lucia:
  The concierge at Julius' Continental Hotel in Rome.
- Tobias Segal as Earl:
  A "homeless" criminal and assassin who works for the Bowery King in New York City.
- Wass Stevens as the Consiglieri:
  A Russian mobster and Abram's top subordinate.
- Chukwudi Iwuji as Mr. Akoni:
  An underworld figure who is in debt to or part of the High Table and in an uneasy position with Gianna's organization.
- Yamamotoyama Ryūta as Rajah:
  A Japanese sumo wrestler and assassin who hunts John in an attempt to claim Santino's bounty.

== Production ==
=== Development ===
In February 2015, directors Chad Stahelski and David Leitch stated that a John Wick sequel had begun development. In the same month, Jon Feltheimer, CEO of Lionsgate, stated during a conference call that "We see John Wick as a multiple-title action franchise". Additionally, it was reported that Kolstad would return to write the screenplay. In May 2015, it was confirmed that a sequel was greenlit, and Lionsgate would be selling the film at the Cannes Film Festival. Reeves and Stahelski appeared in a 30-minute AOL BUILD interview in early February 2017 to discuss the development and casting of the film.

=== Casting ===
It was announced that Keanu Reeves, Leitch, and Stahelski would return, with filming set to begin in late 2015. In October 2015, Common joined the film to play the head of security for a female crime lord, and Ian McShane was confirmed to return as Winston, the owner of the Continental Hotel. In November 2015, Bridget Moynahan, John Leguizamo, Thomas Sadoski, and Lance Reddick were confirmed to return, while Ruby Rose, Riccardo Scamarcio, and Peter Stormare were added to the cast (due to Michael Nyqvist having health problems). In December 2015, it was announced that Laurence Fishburne would appear in a supporting role. Reeves was trained in Brazilian jiu-jitsu by the Machado brothers for the role.

=== Filming ===
Principal photography on the film began on October 26, 2015, in New York City. At the end of the first week, filming had taken place in Manhattan. Filming then moved to Rome and later resumed in Montreal on October 28, 2015. Studio shots were located in New Jersey.

==== Filming locations ====
John Wick: Chapter 2 was mostly shot on location in New York and Rome. The Continental Hotel seen in the film was in reality the Beaver Building in Manhattan and its rooftop was filmed separately on the roof garden of the Rockefeller Plaza building. John Wick's house was shot at 121 Mill Neck, Long Island, New York. The Continental Hotel in Rome was filmed at the Museo centrale del Risorgimento al Vittoriano, located next to the Roman Forum. The scene of Gianna's coronation party was shot near the ruins of the Baths of Caracalla. Some scenes taking place in the New York City Subway were filmed within the Montreal Metro system.

=== Music ===
Tyler Bates and Joel J. Richard returned to write and compose the film's soundtrack. Along with the return of Le Castle Vania and Ciscandra Nostalghia, the soundtrack has also featured Alice in Chains' guitarist and co-lead vocalist Jerry Cantrell in the song "A Job to Do", whose lyrics were written by Cantrell from the perspective of Keanu Reeves' character.

== Release ==
=== Theatrical ===
John Wick: Chapter 2 premiered at Arclight Hollywood in Los Angeles on January 30, 2017, and was theatrically released in the United States on February 10, 2017, by Summit Entertainment. In the United Kingdom, the film was granted a 15 certificate by the British Board of Film Classification after 23 seconds of a suicide scene were removed to avoid an 18 rating. The film opened in UK cinemas on February 17, 2017, and was distributed by Warner Bros., with co-production from Lionsgate studio Summit Entertainment. Australia was one of the last major countries to receive the film, with a release on May 18.

=== Home media ===
John Wick: Chapter 2 was released on DVD, Blu-ray and Ultra HD Blu-ray on June 13, 2017, from Summit Inc/Lionsgate.

== Reception ==
=== Box office ===
John Wick: Chapter 2 grossed $92 million in the United States and Canada and $82.3 million in other territories for a worldwide gross of $174.3 million. The film grossed $90.5 million worldwide in its first nine days of release, surpassing the entire theatrical gross of the first film ($88.8 million).

In the United States and Canada, the film opened alongside two other sequels, The Lego Batman Movie and Fifty Shades Darker, and was projected to gross around $20 million in its opening weekend. It earned $2.2 million from Thursday night previews at 2,400 theaters, an improvement over the $870,000 made by its predecessor. It made $11 million on its first day, nearly totaling the $14.4 million the first film made in its entire opening weekend. It went on to open to $30.4 million, more than double the opening weekend of the original film and finishing third at the box office behind The Lego Batman Movie ($53 million) and Fifty Shades Darker ($46.6 million). In its second weekend the film grossed $16.2 million (a drop of 46.7%), finishing 4th at the box office and making more in its second weekend than the original film made in its first.

=== Critical response ===
On Rotten Tomatoes, the film has an approval rating of 89% based on 284 reviews and an average rating of 7.00/10. The website's critical consensus reads, "John Wick: Chapter 2 does what a sequel should—which in this case means doubling down on the non-stop, thrillingly choreographed action that made its predecessor so much fun." On Metacritic, the film has a weighted average score of 75 out of 100, based on reviews from 43 critics, indicating "generally favorable" reviews. Audiences polled by CinemaScore gave the film an average grade of "A−" on an A+ to F scale, an improvement from the "B" received by its predecessor, while PostTrak reported filmgoers gave it an 85% overall positive score and a 72% "definite recommend".

Scott Tobias of Uproxx said the film improved upon the original, writing: "For better or worse—though mostly for better—it's a full-scale assault on the senses, constantly pushing itself to greater feats of excess. At this rate, a third John Wick might trigger the apocalypse". Mike Rougeau of IGN gave the film an 8.5/10, stating that it, "takes joy in expanding on the original's lore", and praised the film as a vast improvement of its predecessor in terms of action set pieces, fight choreography, cinematography, and writing. Peter Travers of Rolling Stone called it "the real deal" and "pure cinema".

Writing for Time magazine in February Stephanie Zacharek stated: "The pleasures of John Wick: Chapter 2 may be even greater than those of its predecessor—itself a symphonic achievement in scrappy, balls-out, action filmmaking—because in this one, there's no puppy murder to endure...it's lovers of humankind who are put to the test. John Wick: Chapter 2 asks the classic pulp question—Are human beings worth saving?—and delivers, with the right proportions of joy and sorrow, the classic pulp answer: Sometimes, no".

Both Richard Brody writing for The New Yorker and Stephen M. Colbert writing for Screen Rant saw secret societies as a significant motif in the film. In his article "The World of John Wick Explained", Colbert stated: "John Wick introduced audiences to a dark, polished and sharply dressed, underground criminal society full of assassins who (mostly) abide by an unspoken code of conduct and two explicit rules. While the first movie told a more intimate story that only hinted at the larger world of this secret society, John Wick: Chapter Two takes the titular character through several of the corners of this complex underworld, revealing even more about the world of John Wick. While very few of these customs are explicitly explained, there are still enough hints about the inner functionings of the various entities presented, giving us enough puzzle pieces to put together a loose sketch of this mysterious world of assassins".

Ignatiy Vishnevetsky of The A.V. Club wrote that it "lacks the first film's domino-effect momentum". In part, he praised the action scenes as "entertainingly surreal". In an opinion piece, Jordan Hoffman of The Guardian called the film "a shameful example of Hollywood gun pornography" with a "hyperactive, blood-soaked, corpse-strewn video game aesthetic" but "only trace elements of a plot" and wondered "where the line of decency is as audience bloodlust continues to get chummed".

=== Accolades ===
At the 2017 Golden Trailer Awards, John Wick: Chapter 2 received a nomination for Best Action with "Vengeance" (AV Squad) and won Best Action TV Spot for "Big Vengeance" (AV Squad). Mark Stoeckinger, Alan Rankin, Andy Koyama, Martyn Zub, and Gabe Serano of Formosa Group was nominated for Outstanding Sound – Feature Film at the 2017 Hollywood Post Alliance Awards. The film received nominations for Empire Award for Best Thriller at the 23rd Empire Awards and Best Stunt Work at the Los Angeles Online Film Critics Society Awards 2017.

== Sequels ==
In October 2016, Stahelski stated that a third film, titled John Wick: Chapter 3 – Parabellum, was in development and in June 2017 it was reported that Kolstad would return to write the screenplay with the completed film subsequently released in 2019. A fourth film, titled John Wick: Chapter 4 was announced in May 2019 and was released on March 24, 2023. A fifth film, titled John Wick: Chapter 5 was greenlit in April 2025.
