= Joel J. Richard =

American film composer

- Born: April 13, 1976 (age 50); Connecticut, U.S.
- Genres: Film score, Action film, Hybridity Music
- Occupations: Composer, music producer
- Years active: 2001–present

Joel J. Richard (born April 13, 1976) is an American composer and music producer known for his work on film scores, particularly the John Wick franchise in collaboration with Tyler Bates.

== Early life ==
Richard was born in Connecticut, U.S. His passion for music began at age 12 with a 4-track recorder and electric guitar, leading to early experimental work. He later assisted composer John Powell, gaining experience across genres like animation, action, and romance.

== Career ==
Richard's early film credits include The Bourne Identity (2002), Drumline (2002), I Am Sam (2001), The Butterfly Effect (2004), and The Bourne Ultimatum (2007).

He gained prominence with television scores for Pretty Little Liars (2010), Ravenswood (2013), and Quantico (2015).

Richard co-composed the scores for the entire John Wick series with Tyler Bates, other notable works include Triple Threat (2019) and Books of Blood (2020).

== Style ==
His style blends orchestral elements with experimental hybrid sounds, evolving across the films., avoiding familiar sounds to keep audiences engaged.

== Selected filmography ==
- The Bourne Identity (2002) (Additional music)
- Drumline (2002) (Music assistant)
- I Am Sam (2001) (Assistant to composer and music programmer)
- The Butterfly Effect (2004) (Additional programmer)
- The Bourne Ultimatum (2007) (Additional music, uncredited)
- John Wick (2014)
- John Wick: Chapter 2 (2017)
- John Wick: Chapter 3 – Parabellum (2019)
- Triple Threat (2019)
- Books of Blood (2020)
- John Wick: Chapter 4 (2023)
- Ballerina (2025)
