= Tyler Bates =

American musician, producer, and composer (born 1965)

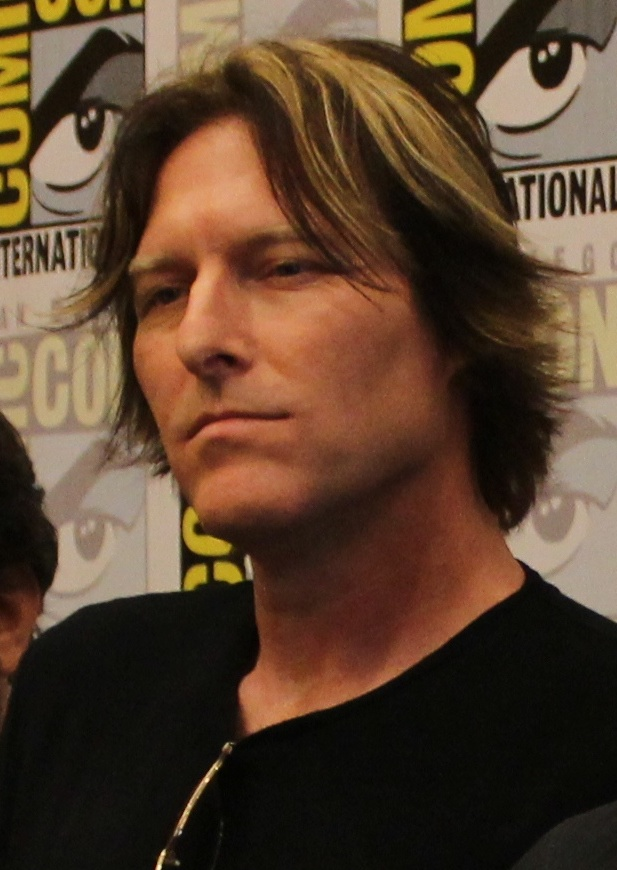
- Bates at the 2014 San Diego Comic-Con

Background information
- Born: June 5, 1965 (age 61)
- Origin: Los Angeles, California, U.S.
- Genres: Film and television scores; classical rock; alternative rock; electronic rock
- Occupations: Film composer; musician; producer
- Instruments: Keyboards; guitar
- Years active: 1993–present
- Formerly of: Marilyn Manson, Smash Alley, Pet
- Website: tylerbates.com

Tyler Bates (born June 5, 1965) is an American musician, music producer, and composer for film, television, and video game scores. Much of his work is in the action and horror film genres, with films like Dawn of the Dead, 300, Sucker Punch, Halloween and Halloween II and the John Wick franchise. He has collaborated with directors like Zack Snyder, Rob Zombie, Genndy Tartakovsky, Neil Marshall, William Friedkin, Scott Derrickson, James Gunn, Chad Stahelski, David Leitch, and Ti West. In addition, he is the former lead guitarist of the American rock band Marilyn Manson, and produced its albums The Pale Emperor, Heaven Upside Down, One Assassination Under God – Chapter 1 and Chapter 2. He is Jerry Cantrell's touring/studio member.

== Early life, family and education ==
Bates was born on June 5, 1965, in Los Angeles, California. Growing up in Chicago, Illinois, he played in a hair metal band Smash Alley.

== Career ==
Bates returned to Los Angeles in 1993 to pursue a career in music. He began his career in the 1990s scoring low-budget films like The Last Time I Committed Suicide, and Denial. In the meantime, he was a member of the alternative rock Pet alongside Lisa Papineau; the band released their eponymous debut in 1996. His breakthrough into the mainstream came in the early 2000s, when he worked on higher-profile projects like Get Carter, Half Past Dead, and Baadasssss!. The 2004 remake of Dawn of the Dead was significant, as he would maintain long-term collaborations with its director Zack Snyder, and writer James Gunn.

Bates scored four of director Rob Zombie's films, beginning with 2005's The Devil's Rejects. For Zombie's remake of Halloween and its sequel Halloween II, Bates adapted John Carpenter's original themes and motifs in order to fit the darker, grittier, and more contemporary atmosphere of the films. It was around 2007 that Bates began working regularly on big-budget, blockbuster films; including 300, Doomsday, The Day the Earth Stood Still, Sucker Punch, and Conan the Barbarian. He also composed scores for smaller, independent films like The Way, Killer Joe, The Sacrament, and Flight 7500.

The soundtrack for 300 was controversial due to its heavy borrowing of themes from film scores by Elliot Goldenthal, amongst others. On August 3, 2007, Warner Bros. Pictures acknowledged this in a statement. The matter was settled amicably with the soundtrack credits being subsequently described as adapted from material by Elliot Goldenthal.

Bates composed the score for Guardians of the Galaxy in 2014. Having worked with James Gunn in the past, Bates had a good idea on how Gunn wanted things done. Before any of the cinematography started, Gunn had Bates write several themes prior to shooting so the scene could be matched to the music instead of the score being created to fit the scene. This required cooperation between Bates and Gunn in advance since these scores would be in the final piece, instead of a temporary filler acting as a placeholder. They influenced the performance on set, which required an undertaking by both Bates and his team. For four months, they clocked upwards of 100-hour work weeks to produce this finished product. After all the work, they had a total of 29 different soundtracks giving a combined total of 64:34 of music. "At least half the cues in the movie have more than 500 tracks of audio," Bates was quoted in an interview with Melinda Newman on HitFix. This was a result of there being orchestral passages that were doubled or tripled, choirs, overdubs, and other instrumentals.

That same year, Bates composed the score to the action film John Wick, collaborating with Joel J. Richard and Marilyn Manson. The film proved a surprise critical and financial success, and Bates returned to score its sequel John Wick: Chapter 2, and also its third and fourth installments. He and Richard also scored its 2025 spin-off Ballerina, replacing Marco Beltrami and Anna Drubich. He would later collaborate again with co-director David Leitch to score a spiritual successor, the Cold War-era spy thriller Atomic Blonde.

Bates composed the soundtrack for the PlayStation 3 games God of War: Ascension and Army of Two: The 40th Day, as well as the PlayStation 4 game Killzone: Shadow Fall. Most recently he composed for Crossfire.

=== Other projects ===
In 2014, Bates co-wrote and produced Marilyn Manson's record The Pale Emperor. The album debuted at number 8 on the Billboard 200, while the single "Deep Six" went on to chart higher than any other single by Marilyn Manson on Billboard's Mainstream Rock Chart. Bates joined the band in 2015 as the lead guitarist for The Hell Not Hallelujah Tour. The album's song "Cupid Carries a Gun" was used as the opening title music of the TV show Salem, and Bates composed the show's score. In April 2015 he left Marilyn Manson to resume film work.

In October 2015, during a Q&A with Marilyn Manson at the Grammy Museum, Manson announced that he and Tyler were working on new music together again. In 2015 Loudwire listed "The Mephistopheles Of Los Angeles" No. 1 best rock track and Rolling Stone included The Pale Emperor in its Top 50 list of the best albums of 2015. He returned as the lead guitarist during the tour with Slipknot in July 2016. In 2017, they worked for the follow-up Heaven Upside Down with a world tour, starting July 20, in Budapest, playing more than 100 shows around the world. In January 2018, Bates announced via Twitter that he left the band and returned to his studio to work exclusively on film and television.

Tyler composed the song "Monsters After Dark" for the night Halloween mode of the ride Guardians of the Galaxy – Mission: Breakout!.

In 2021, Bates co-produced and played strings, percussion and guitar on Jerry Cantrell's album Brighten.

In 2026, Bates collaborated with the industrial rock/ metal band Health to release a single named "Outer Dark".

== Discography ==
=== Film scores ===
Year	Title	Director(s)	Notes
1993	Blue Flame	Cassian Elwes	Composed with George Andrian
1994	Deep Down	John Travers	—N/a
1994	Tammy and the T-Rex	Stewart Raffill	Composed with Jack Conrad and Anthony Riparetti
1995	Not Like Us	Dave Payne	—N/a
1995	Criminal Hearts	Dave Payne	—N/a
1997	The Last Time I Committed Suicide	Stephen T. Kay	—N/a
1998	Suicide, the Comedy	Glen Freyer	—N/a
1998	Denial	Adam Rifkin	1st collaboration with Adam Rifkin
1999	Thicker than Water	Richard Cummings Jr.	Composed with Quincy Jones III
2000	Shriek If You Know What I Did Last Friday the Thirteenth	John Blanchard	—N/a
2000	Get Carter	Stephen Kay	Themes by Roy Budd
2000	Rated X	Emilio Estevez	1st collaboration with Emilio Estevez
2001	Kingdom Come	Doug McHenry	Composed with John E. Rhone
2001	What's the Worst That Could Happen?	Sam Weisman	—N/a
2001	Night at the Golden Eagle	Adam Rifkin	2nd collaboration with Adam Rifkin
2002	Love and a Bullet	Ben Ramsey	Composed with Wolfgang Matthes
2002	Half Past Dead	Don Michael Paul	—N/a
2002	Lone Star State of Mind	David Semel	—N/a
2002	City of Ghosts	Matt Dillon	—N/a
2003	Baadasssss!	Mario Van Peebles	—N/a
2004	You Got Served	Chris Stokes	—N/a
2004	Dawn of the Dead	Zack Snyder	1st collaboration with Zack Snyder; Nominated–IFMCA Award for Best Original Score for a Horror/Thriller Film
2005	The Devil's Rejects	Rob Zombie	1st collaboration with Rob Zombie; Fangoria Chainsaw Award for Best Score
2006	See No Evil	Gregory Dark	—N/a
2006	Slither	James Gunn	1st collaboration with James Gunn
2006	300	Zack Snyder	Adapted from material by Elliot Goldenthal; 2nd collaboration with Zack Snyder; BMI Film Music Award; Nominated–Saturn Award for Best Music
2007	Grindhouse	Rob Zombie	2nd collaboration with Rob Zombie; Segment: "Werewolf Women of the SS"
2007	Halloween	Rob Zombie	3rd collaboration with Rob Zombie; Themes by John Carpenter
2008	Doomsday	Neil Marshall	—N/a
2008	The Day the Earth Stood Still	Scott Derrickson	—N/a
2009	Watchmen	Zack Snyder	3rd collaboration with Zack Snyder; BMI Film Music Award
2009	Halloween II	Rob Zombie	4th collaboration with Rob Zombie; Themes by John Carpenter
2009	The Haunted World of El Superbeasto	Rob Zombie	5th collaboration with Rob Zombie
2010	Super	James Gunn	2nd collaboration with James Gunn
2010	The Way	Emilio Estevez	2nd collaboration with Emilio Estevez
2011	Sucker Punch	Zack Snyder	Composed with Marius de Vries; 4th collaboration with Zack Snyder
2011	Conan the Barbarian	Marcus Nispel	—N/a
2011	Killer Joe	William Friedkin	—N/a
2011	The Darkest Hour	Chris Gorak	—N/a
2013	Movie 43	James Gunn	Segment: "Beezel"; 3rd collaboration with James Gunn
2013	The Sacrament	Ti West	1st collaboration with Ti West
2014	Not Safe for Work	Joe Johnston	—N/a
2014	Flight 7500	Takashi Shimizu	—N/a
2014	Guardians of the Galaxy	James Gunn	4th collaboration with James Gunn; Nominated–Hollywood Music in Media Award for Best Original Score in a Sci-Fi Film; Nominated–IndieWire Critics Poll Award for Best Original Score Soundtrack
2014	John Wick	Chad Stahelski; David Leitch	Composed with Joel J. Richard; 1st collaboration with David Leitch & Chad Stahelski
2016	The Belko Experiment	Greg McLean	—N/a
2017	John Wick: Chapter 2	Chad Stahelski	Composed with Joel J. Richard; 2nd collaboration with Chad Stahelski; BMI Film Music Award
2017	Guardians of the Galaxy Vol. 2	James Gunn	5th collaboration with James Gunn
2017	Atomic Blonde	David Leitch	2nd collaboration with David Leitch
2017	Keep Watching	Sean Carter	—N/a
2017	24 Hours to Live	Brian Smrz	—N/a
2018	The Public	Emilio Estevez	3rd collaboration with Emilio Estevez; Composed with Joanne Higginbottom
2018	Deadpool 2	David Leitch	3rd collaboration with David Leitch; Nominated–Hollywood Music in Media Award for Best Original Score in a Sci-Fi Film
2018	The Spy Who Dumped Me	Susanna Fogel	—N/a
2019	John Wick: Chapter 3 – Parabellum	Chad Stahelski	Composed with Joel J. Richard; 3rd collaboration with Chad Stahelski
2019	Fast & Furious Presents: Hobbs & Shaw	David Leitch	4th collaboration with David Leitch
2020	Books of Blood	Brannon Braga	Composed with Joel J. Richard
2022	X	Ti West	Composed with Chelsea Wolfe; 2nd collaboration with Ti West
2022	Day Shift	J. J. Perry	—N/a
2022	Pearl	Ti West	Composed with Timothy Williams; 3rd collaboration with Ti West
2023	John Wick: Chapter 4	Chad Stahelski	Composed with Joel J. Richard; 4th collaboration with Chad Stahelski
2024	MaXXXine	Ti West	4th collaboration with Ti West
2025	Ballerina	Len Wiseman	Composed with Joel J. Richard; Replaced Marco Beltrami and Anna Drubich
2025	One Spoon of Chocolate	RZA	—N/a
2025	Fixed	Genndy Tartakovsky	Composed with Joanne Higginbottom; 1st score for an animated feature film
2026	Ebenezer	Ti West	5th collaboration with Ti West
TBA	Highlander	Chad Stahelski	5th collaboration with Chad Stahelski

=== Television scores ===
Year	Title	Notes
2001	Strange Frequency	3 episodes
2001	American High	Documentary series 4 episodes
2003	Black Sash	8 episodes
2004	Pornucopia	2 episodes
2007–14	Californication	84 episodes
2008–09	James Gunn's PG Porn	7 episodes
2010–11	Sym-Bionic Titan	20 episodes
2013	Low Winter Sun	10 episodes
2014	Hysteria	TV pilot
2014–16	Salem	29 episodes
2014–17	Kingdom	31 episodes
2017	Samurai Jack	10 episodes Themes by James L. Venable, will.i.am and George Pajon; Composed with Joanne Higginbottom and Dieter Hartmann
2017	The Exorcist	10 episodes Themes by Daniel Hart
2017–19	The Punisher	26 episodes
2018–19	The Purge	20 episodes
2019–20	Stumptown	18 episodes
2019–present	Primal	21 episodes Composed with Joanne Higginbottom
2023	Agent Elvis	10 episodes Composed with Timothy Williams
2023	Unicorn: Warriors Eternal	10 episodes Composed with Joanne Higginbottom
2024–present	Tracker	42 episodes Composed with Joanne Higginbottom

=== Video game soundtracks ===
Year	Title	Notes
2008	Rise of the Argonauts	—N/a
2009	Watchmen: The End Is Nigh	—N/a
2010	Army of Two: The 40th Day	—N/a
2010	Transformers: War for Cybertron	—N/a
2013	God of War: Ascension	—N/a
2013	Killzone: Shadow Fall	Composed with Lorn
2019	Far Cry New Dawn	Composed with John Swihart
2022	Call of Duty: Modern Warfare II	Season 6

=== Own work ===
- Roseland with Azam Ali

=== With Marilyn Manson ===
- The Pale Emperor (2015)
- Heaven Upside Down (2017)
- One Assassination Under God – Chapter 1 (2024)
- One Assassination Under God – Chapter 2 (2026)

=== With Pet ===
- Pet (1996) (guitar, bass, backing vocals, production)

=== With Bush ===
- The Kingdom (2020) (songwriting, production)

=== With Jerry Cantrell ===
- Brighten (2021) (strings, percussion, guitar, production)
