= John Wick (character) =

Protagonist of the John Wick franchise

- John Wick character
- Keanu Reeves as John Wick in John Wick: Chapter 2 (2017)
- First appearance: John Wick (2014)
- Created by: Derek Kolstad
- Portrayed by: Keanu Reeves
- Voiced by: Keanu Reeves (Untitled John Wick game); Dave Fouquette (John Wick Hex and Payday 2)

In-universe information
- Full name: Jardani Jovonovich (Ярдані Яванавіч) John Wick
- Alias: Jonathan "John" Wick
- Nickname: Baba Yaga/The Boogeyman
- Gender: Male
- Occupation: Hitman; vigilante
- Affiliation: Ruska Roma crime syndicate; Tarasov crime syndicate; The Continental; High Table
- Fighting style: Brazilian jiu-jitsu; Japanese jiu-jitsu; Judo; Kali; Krav Maga; Sambo
- Family: Ruska Roma (tribe)
- Spouse: Helen (deceased)
- Origin: Soviet Belarus
- Nationality: Belarusian; American

Jonathan Wick is a character created by American screenwriter Derek Kolstad and portrayed by Canadian actor Keanu Reeves. He is the title antihero protagonist of the neo-noir media franchise John Wick.

John is introduced as a legendary hitman who is thrust back into the criminal underworld after Russian-American mobsters, not realizing John's past, assault him, kill his puppy, and steal his car. The attack sets John on a path of revenge, returning him to the violent lifestyle that he had left behind and eventually bringing him into conflict with the international organization of assassins.

== Main character biography ==
John was born Jardani Jovonovich in the Byelorussian SSR of the Soviet Union to a Ruska Roma family on September 2, 1964. He was orphaned at a young age before being taken in by an old friend of his father, Winston, who would eventually become John's mentor. It is revealed in the John Wick comic book mini-series that he spent a significant portion of his adolescence in El Sauzal de Rodriguez, Ensenada Mexico. At one point, he was recruited by a Ruska Roma organized crime group in New York City and trained by its leader, a woman known as The Director. Under the Director's supervision, John was trained as a hitman and learned combat skills in martial arts, firearms and other weaponry, tactical driving, infiltration, escapology, and more. After leaving the Ruska Roma organization, he was arrested for an unspecified crime and incarcerated. Upon release, he was manipulated into joining the underground crime world operating out of the Continental Hotel chain. John became the top enforcer for the New York Russian mafia, becoming an infamous hitman. He was nicknamed "Baba Yaga" after the supernatural Bogeyman-like entity in Slavic folklore. At some point, he goes on contract to rescue Winston and the New York Continental's concierge, Charon, from Hex, a crime lord who goes against the High Table.

Eventually, John fell in love with a woman named Helen. Hoping to pursue a normal life, he met with Viggo Tarasov, boss of the New York Russian mafia, who agreed to grant him his freedom if he could carry out what was described as an "impossible task", implying that John was not expected to survive the mission. John requested assistance from Camorra crime boss Santino D'Antonio and subsequently ended up owing him a blood oath called a "marker". John eliminated all of Tarasov's major rivals, thus enabling Tarasov to become one of New York's most powerful crime bosses. John retired and settled down with Helen, his reputation now legendary, and the two lived happily together in New Jersey for five years until Helen's death from an unspecified illness.

=== Returning from retirement ===
Following Helen's death from a terminal illness, John largely remains isolated from society. He spends his days driving his prized 1969 Ford Boss 429 Mustang and caring for his new beagle puppy named Daisy, the last gift from his deceased wife. When Iosef Tarasov, Viggo's son, breaks into his home, assaults John, steals his car and kills Daisy, the vengeful John goes on a violent rampage. Knowing that John will likely stop at nothing to kill Iosef, Viggo attempts to protect his son and sends numerous assassins to stop John, but he kills them all. John eventually kills Iosef and Viggo. Afterwards, John rescues a pit bull puppy scheduled to be euthanized from an animal shelter and returns home.

=== Fulfilling his blood oath ===
After taking revenge on the Tarasovs, John retrieves his prized car from Viggo's brother, Abram, and forms a truce with him. Wick's hopes of returning to retirement are ruined by Santino D'Antonio, who demands he complete his blood oath and assassinate Santino's own sister, Gianna D'Antonio, allowing Santino to take her place at The High Table. When John refuses, Santino retaliates by destroying his house. John reluctantly travels to Rome and fulfills the oath, only to realize that Santino is targeting him to tie up loose ends. Santino sends his bodyguard Ares to kill John, while Gianna's bodyguard Cassian also pursues John for killing his ward. John wounds but spares Cassian, and kills Ares.

Santino places a $7 million bounty on John's head, after which John enlists assistance from the Bowery King. John, after massacring hordes of assassins, eventually finds Santino in the Continental, where no bloodshed is permitted. John breaks the rule by killing Santino on the hotel premises, forcing Winston to declare him "excommunicado", meaning that Continental and the associated underworld services are no longer afforded to him. Winston, however, gives John one hour to flee before the excommunicado becomes active and the bounty is doubled and offered globally by The High Table.

=== Surviving Excommunicado ===
Excommunicated, exhausted, and wounded, John prepares to escape from New York as assassins gather to kill him after learning of the now $14 million bounty placed on his head. Wick uses his allegiances to the Ruska Roma, the Director helping John escape by offering him safe passage to Morocco, at the cost that he may never ask the Ruska Roma for help again.

John meets with Sofia, an old friend, manager of the Moroccan Continental, and someone whose marker John holds for rescuing Sofia's daughter. Sofia helps him find the Elder, the one man who is above the High Table itself. The Elder agrees to rescind the excommunicado in return for John killing Winston and serving the High Table for the remainder of his life. John severs his ring finger and offers his wedding ring to the Elder to prove his fealty.

John then returns to New York and is pursued by assassins until he reaches the safe haven of the Continental. John reunites with Winston but decides to spare him. Instead, John and the hotel's concierge, Charon, fight against the High Table and their enforcers. Successfully defeating waves of attackers, Winston and High Table representative, the Adjudicator, have a parley on the hotel roof. Ultimately, Winston shoots John in his bulletproof jacket multiple times to restore his standing with the High Table, while not wanting to betray him, and John tumbles from the roof into the street. The Bowery King, recovering from grave wounds inflicted by the Adjudicator's assassin named Zero, retrieves the badly injured John in his hideout, where he tells John that he plans to declare war against the High Table. John agrees to join him.

=== Eve's revenge ===
After Eve Macarro—whom John had briefly met while seeking help from the Director—goes rogue, the Director hires him to kill her in order to prevent war between the Ruska Roma and the Cult. Unable to convince Eve to give up her mission and sympathetic to her, John agrees to allow Eve until midnight to kill the Chancellor or John will be forced to fulfill his contract. During the battle that follows, John kills cultist Dex to save Eve's life. In retaliation, a number of cultists attack him, but they are quickly dispatched. After Eve successfully kills the Chancellor, John calls the Director to inform her of his death which she is satisfied by as war has been prevented.

=== Exacting revenge on the High Table ===
With the help of the Bowery King, John starts to exact revenge on the High Table. John returns to Morocco and kills the new Elder, when he says that he cannot return John's wedding ring given to the previous Elder. Afterwards, John goes to Osaka to seek guidance from his friend Shimazu Koji, manager of Osaka's Continental, who informs him that the High Table destroyed the New York Continental and executed Charon. There, he's ambushed by a wave of High Table assassins. He discovers that Caine, an old friend of his and Koji, is leading the effort for his capture. John manages to escape, taking a pin from one of the assassins, and goes back to New York, where he meets Winston - now excommunicado - who tells John that the pin represents loyalty to the Marquis Vincent Bisset de Gramont, the High Table member in charge of his manhunt, and the only way John can get his freedom is to challenge de Gramont for a duel on behalf of a crime family.

John then travels to Berlin to meet Pyotr, the Ruska Roma patriarch, only to discover that he was also killed by the High Table and the syndicate is now run by John's adoptive sister, Katia. She agrees to let John back into Ruska Roma as long as he kills Killa, the German High Table senior who murdered Pyotr. John fights and kills Killa in his nightclub and Katia brands John's arm with a Ruska Roma crest, now enabling him to request a duel to fight the Marquis.

In Paris, John and de Gramont decide the parameters of their duel, in a meeting moderated by the Harbinger, the Table's emissary. With the weapons of choice being duelling pistols, the duel is to take place the following sunrise at Sacré-Cœur and the Harbinger informs John that both he and Winston will be executed should he fail to appear on time, but not before de Gramont nominates a reluctant Caine to fight in his place. The Bowery King arrives in Paris to give John a weapon and a new ballistic suit. De Gramont attempts to prevent John from arriving to the duel by placing a $40 million contract on his head, which forces John to fight his way through Paris to reach the Sacré-Cœur just in time. Caine and John duel with pistols and Caine gravely wounds John in the first three rounds. De Gramont asks to personally execute John for the final round, but John, who had not yet fired his gun, shoots and kills de Gramont. The Harbinger declares John free of his obligation to the High Table, along with Caine. Shortly thereafter, John collapses.

Winston and the Bowery King are then seen at John's grave, which is next to his wife Helen's with the epitaph "Loving Husband", which John had earlier requested of Winston. The Bowery King also takes ownership of John's dog.

== Characterization ==
The character and franchise has been described as a "central boogeyman character who can't be killed" and a "modern, action-oriented equivalent of '80s horror franchises", and reportedly has a kill count of 439, exceeding Jason Voorhees, Michael Myers and Art the Clown combined. Wick's violent one-man crusade has been described as an extreme case of workplace rage. He is largely seen wearing dark colored, tailored suits outfitted with ballistic armor. He is a deadly combatant and proficient with handguns, rifles, knives, and various other forms of weaponry as well as with hand-to-hand fighting. He has a large tattoo on his back with a Latin phrase written across praying hands holding a cross that reads, Fortis Fortuna Adiuvat. Wick is multilingual, having been seen speaking English, Russian, Hebrew, Italian, Japanese, Indonesian, Cantonese, and American Sign Language.

== In other media ==
John Wick appeared in Payday 2 as part of free tie-in content and later on the John Wick Heists DLC.

John Wick appeared as a crossover cosmetic outfit in the battle royale game Fortnite. This was the result of young players mistaking Reeves for another outfit named The Reaper.

A parody composite character of John Wick and Rick Sanchez, simply referred to as "John Rick", was added as a playable character to Pocket Mortys in June 2017, voiced by Justin Roiland, as cross-promotion with the home media release of John Wick: Chapter 2.

A parody of John Wick, simply referred to as "the Boogeyman" and "the Living Blade", and visually based on a beardless Keanu Reeves, is featured in a Marvel Comics Black Widow storyline published in January 2022, written by Kelly Thompson and illustrated by Rafael T. Pimente.

The 2026 parody film Scary Movie has a sequence featuring Anna Faris' character Cindy Campbell dispatching an army of Ghostface in the style of John Wick.
