= Caine (film) =

American film by Donnie Yen

- Directed by: Donnie Yen
- Screenplay by: Robert Askins; Mattson Tomlin
- Story by: Donnie Yen; Chad Stahelski
- Based on: John Wick by Derek Kolstad
- Produced by: Erica Lee; Basil Iwanyk; Chad Stahelski
- Starring: Donnie Yen; Rina Sawayama; Dacre Montgomery; Mason Thames; Bill Nighy
- Cinematography: Markus Förderer
- Production companies: Summit Entertainment; Thunder Road Films; 87Eleven Entertainment
- Distributed by: Lionsgate
- Country: United States
- Language: English

Caine is an upcoming action thriller film directed by Donnie Yen, with a script co-written by Robert Askins and Mattson Tomlin, from an original story by Yen who co-authored with Chad Stahelski. Intended to be the sixth feature film, and seventh overall installment in the John Wick franchise, the plot centers on the titular character who navigates his release from the assassin organization known as the High Table; the movie takes place chronologically after the events of John Wick: Chapter 4.

The film stars story writer/director Donnie Yen in the lead role as Caine, with Rina Sawayama reprising her role as Akira in a supporting role, and also Dacre Montgomery, Mason Thames, and Bill Nighy. The project is a joint-venture production between Thunder Road Films and 87Eleven Productions, with Lionsgate distributing. Principal photography commenced in April 2026 and ended in July.

== Cast ==
- Donnie Yen as Caine
- Rina Sawayama as Shimazu Akira
- Dacre Montgomery
- Mason Thames
- Bill Nighy
- Zhuang Dafei as Mia, Caine's daughter

In addition, Ray Lui and Jacky Heung were cast in undisclosed roles, while Julius Brian Siswojo plays a taxi driver.

== Production ==
=== Development ===
In March 2023, John Wick: Chapter 4 producer Erica Lee stated that Lionsgate Films was working on an as-of-yet untitled film that will further expand the John Wick franchise. Though she would not give any details at that time, she stated that it would be announced within the upcoming months. Lee expressed further interest in a project detailing the backstory of the character portrayed by Rina Sawayama, named Akira. The producer later expounded on the topic, revealing her personal interest in seeing a spin-off featuring the character become a reality.

In March 2023, Donnie Yen similarly expressed interest in reprising his role from Chapter 4 in a potential spin-off centered around his character Caine. The actor acknowledged that there were ongoing discussions for such a reprisal at that time, serving as a continuation of the Chapter 4's post-credits scene which depicted Akira seeking lethal revenge against Caine. In November of the same year, Chad Stahelski confirmed that there were multiple projects in development that would further explore the story included in the post-credits of the fourth film. Following the resolution of the writers and actors strikes, Lionsgate confirmed that work on multiple films had officially resumed.

In May 2024, it was officially announced that a film centered around Caine was in development, with Yen reprising his role as the titular character. The script, written by Robert Askins, will explore the continuing story that chronologically follows the final scene of Chapter 4. Chad Stahelski, Basil Iwanyk and Erica Lee would serve as producers. The trio would oversee the movie, through their continued developmental roles at Lionsgate for all John Wick franchise installments. By October of the same year, Stahelski confirmed that the untitled movie was currently in development and that it would be one several upcoming John Wick projects to be produced.

Lionsgate announced the project had been greenlit in April 2025 at CinemaCon, with Yen serving as director, while Mattson Tomlin would write a new draft of the previous draft written by Askins, which was based on a pitch from Stahelski and Yen; Yen would serve as an executive producer; while Stahelski would oversee production in his franchise role at Lionsgate. The plot would follow the character released from his role with the High Table and take place chronologically after the events of Chapter 4. Described as a modern-day classic Hong Kong-style kung-fu movie, the project was stated to be a joint-venture production between Lionsgate, Thunder Road Films and 87Eleven Entertainment.

=== Casting ===
In April 2025, Donnie Yen was cast in the lead role, reprising the character from John Wick: Chapter 4. Rina Sawayama was confirmed to reprise her role as Akira in May 2025. In May 2026, Dacre Montgomery joined the cast. In June 2026, Mason Thames and Bill Nighy joined the cast.

=== Filming ===
In September 2025, Donnie Yen began scouting locations for the production in Hong Kong. He said that most of the film is set in Europe, but he insisted that part of his character's story be set and shot in Hong Kong. Markus Förderer serves as the cinematographer. Principal photography was initially planned to begin in 2025, but was later postponed to April 2026. Filming commenced in Budapest, Hungary, on April 25, 2026.

The production arrived in Hong Kong in late June for location scouting, where Yen and the crew were seen at The Big Buddha and Tai O fishing village, and filming in the city was scheduled to wrap in July. Filming took place at Tsing Shan Monastery in Tuen Mun on July 6, where Yen and Jacky Heung were seen on set, and at the Hong Kong Palace Museum in the West Kowloon Cultural District on July 8 (Tuesday), which was the museum's regular closing day. The production then moved to Hollywood Road in Central on July 9, where Yen, Mason Thames, Ray Lui, and Julius Brian Siswojo were spotted filming. Yen and Thames continued shooting at The Big Buddha on July 10. On July 13, filming of a triad funeral scene took place on Portland Street in Mong Kok and at the Hong Kong Cultural Centre in Tsim Sha Tsui, with the latter decorated to resemble a funeral home. Yen and Zhuang Dafei also filmed on Fa Yuen Street, Mong Kok, before principal photography wrapped on July 16.
