= 87Eleven Entertainment =

American film production company

- Type: Private
- Industry: Film industry
- Genre: Action
- Founded: 2006; 20 years ago in Inglewood, California
- Founder: Chad Stahelski; David Leitch; Damon Caro
- Key people: Chad Stahelski; Jason Spitz

87eleven Action Design, later 87Eleven Entertainment is an American independent film production and stunt coordination company. The company was founded in 2006 by partners Damon Caro, Chad Stahelski, and David Leitch. The stunt company later developed a production studio arm in December 2019. In 2024, Alex Young, formerly co-president of 20th Century Fox, was hired to co-lead film.

== History ==
87eleven Action Design was founded by Damon Caro Chad Stahelski and David Leitch in 2006.

In 2011 Damon Caro parted ways with the company.

In 2019, Leitch left in order to found his own production company further north in Hollywood, 87North Productions.

== Filmography ==
=== As 87Eleven Productions (2014–2019) ===
| Year | Title | Director | Production Partners | Distributor | Notes |
|---|---|---|---|---|---|
| 2014 | John Wick | Chad Stahelski | Thunder Road Pictures, MJW Films, DefyNite Films | Summit Entertainment | Leitch co-directed with Stahelski, but the Directors Guild of America awarded sole directorial credit to Stahelski; Leitch instead received accreditation as a producer. |
| 2017 | Atomic Blonde | David Leitch | Sierra Pictures, Denver and Delilah Productions, Chickie the Cop, TGIM Films | Focus Features | |
| 2017 | John Wick: Chapter 2 | Chad Stahelski | Thunder Road Pictures | Summit Entertainment | |
| 2019 | John Wick: Chapter 3 – Parabellum | Chad Stahelski | Thunder Road Films | Lionsgate | |

=== As 87Eleven Entertainment ===
| Year | Title | Director | Production Partners | Distributor | Notes |
|---|---|---|---|---|---|
| 2020 | Bruised | Halle Berry | Entertainment 360, Thunder Road Pictures, Romulus Entertainment | Netflix | |
| 2022 | Day Shift | J. J. Perry | Impossible Dream Entertainment | Netflix | |
| 2023 | John Wick: Chapter 4 | Chad Stahelski | Thunder Road Films | Lionsgate | |
| 2025 | Ballerina | Len Wiseman | Thunder Road Films | Lionsgate | |
| 2025 | Wick Is Pain | Jeffrey Doe | Narrator | Lionsgate | |
| 2027 | Karoshi | Takashi Doscher | - | Lionsgate | |
| TBA | Highlander | Chad Stahelski | United Artists, Original Film, Davis-Panzer Productions | Amazon MGM Studios | |
| TBA | Caine | Donnie Yen | Thunder Road Films | Lionsgate | |

== See also ==
87North Productions
