= The Continental: From the World of John Wick =

2023 American action miniseries

- Genre: Action thriller; Crime drama
- Based on: John Wick by Derek Kolstad
- Developed by: Greg Coolidge; Kirk Ward; Shawn Simmons
- Showrunners: Greg Coolidge; Kirk Ward
- Directed by: Albert Hughes; Charlotte Brändström
- Starring: Mel Gibson; Colin Woodell; Mishel Prada; Ben Robson; Hubert Point-Du Jour; Nhung Kate; Jessica Allain; Ayomide Adegun; Jeremy Bobb; Peter Greene
- Opening theme: “Hard Times” by Baby Huey & the Babysitters
- Composer: Raffertie
- Country of origin: United States
- Original language: English
- No. of episodes: 3

Production
- Executive producers: Rhett Reese; Paul Wernick; Chad Stahelski; David Leitch; Derek Kolstad; Basil Iwanyk; Erica Lee; Shawn Simmons; Marshall Persinger; Albert Hughes; Greg Coolidge; Kirk Ward
- Producers: Iain Smith; Mark Taylor
- Production location: Hungary
- Cinematography: Pål Ulvik Rokseth; Peter Deming
- Editors: Ron Rosen; Steven Lang
- Running time: 79–97 minutes
- Production companies: Last Man Standing Films; Cool-ish Productions; Reese Wernick Productions; King of Brockton Inc; Thunder Road Pictures; Lionsgate Television

Original release
- Network: Peacock
- Release: September 22 – October 6, 2023

Related
- John Wick

The Continental: From the World of John Wick (also known simply as The Continental ) is an American neo noir crime-action drama television miniseries developed by Greg Coolidge, Kirk Ward, and Shawn Simmons that serves as a spin-off and a prequel in the John Wick franchise. Coolidge and Ward served as showrunners for the series and wrote the scripts alongside Simmons and Ken Kristensen. Albert Hughes directed the first and third episodes, and Charlotte Brändström directed the second. The show stars Mel Gibson and Colin Woodell.

The series premiered on September 22, 2023, on Peacock in the United States, and on Amazon Prime Video internationally.

== Premise ==
The Continental: From the World of John Wick tells the background story of how Winston Scott, in the 1970s, came to his position as proprietor of the New York branch of "The Continental" chain of hotels, safe havens for professional assassins on the grounds of which no business may ever take place.

== Cast ==
=== Main ===
- Mel Gibson as Cormac O'Connor, who runs the Continental of New York during the 1970s.
- Colin Woodell as Winston Scott, a Scottish-American businessman who has been living in London for decades; Ian McShane portrays an older version of the character in the main John Wick films.
  - Fflyn Edwards as Young Winston
- Mishel Prada as KD ("Kady") di Silva, a detective sergeant new to New York City who is searching for the Scott brothers.
- Ben Robson as Francis Patrick "Frankie" Scott Jr., an assassin who is Winston's older brother, Yen's husband, and a Vietnam War vet.
  - Ben Robinson as Young Frankie
- Hubert Point-Du Jour as Miles Burton, a gunrunner, Vietnam War veteran, and son of deceased High Table assassin Hieronymus Burton.
- Nhung Kate as Yen Scott, Frankie's wife and a former assassin and failed suicide bomber.
- Jessica Allain as Lou Burton, an amateur karate practitioner with a dislike for guns, Miles' younger sister and Hieronymus' daughter, who is unaware of his assassin past.
- Ayomide Adegun as Charon O'Connor, Cormac's surrogate son, who seeks for Cormac to bring over his biological father from Nigeria; Lance Reddick portrayed an older version of the character in the main John Wick films.
- Jeremy Bobb as Mayhew, KD's boss, with whom she is having an affair.
- Peter Greene as Uncle Charlie, a longtime family friend of the Scott family; David Patrick Kelly portrayed an older version of the character in the first two John Wick films.

=== Supporting ===
- Adam Shapiro as Lemmy, an associate of Miles.
- Katie McGrath as the Adjudicator, a judge of the High Table easily identified by her porcelain mask.
- Mark Musashi and Marina Mazepa as "The Twins" a.k.a. Hansel and Gretel, highly skilled assassins with a room at the Continental.
- Kirk Ward as The Henchman, the Adjudicator's bodyguard.
- Claire Cooper as Rosalind Davenport.
- Ray McKinnon as Gene Jenkins, an assassin associate of Lou's, whose eyesight is failing.
- Zainab Jah as Mazie, who took charge of and was proclaimed queen of the Bowery by the High Table.
- Dan Li as the Orphan Master, a local crime boss who comes to blows with Lou over her father's legacy.
- Chris Ryman as Ronnie, one of Uncle Charlie's men.
- Samuel Blenkin as Thomas Caine, O'Connor's cellist.

== Episodes ==
| No. | Title | Directed by | Written by | Original release date |
|---|---|---|---|---|
| 1 | "Brothers in Arms" | Albert Hughes | Greg Coolidge & Kirk Ward and Shawn Simmons | September 22, 2023 |
During a New Year's Eve party at the Continental Hotel in 1970s New York, Frankie Scott steals a press used by the High Table to mint gold coins. The Continental's manager, Cormac O'Connor, raised Frankie and his now-estranged brother Winston from childhood as criminals. Pressured by the Table, he kidnaps Winston for questioning about Frankie's whereabouts. Winston claims to know nothing, but Cormac has him followed. Winston's old colleague Charlie connects him to siblings Lou and Miles, gun-runners and owners of a karate dojo. Miles, Frankie's old Vietnam War comrade, provides a lead to Alphabet City, where Winston finds Frankie and his wife Yen hiding in an abandoned cinema. There, they are attacked by Cormac's assassins. The trio returns to Charlie, but one of Charlie's associates has betrayed them to Cormac. They are pursued to a building roof where Frankie positioned a helicopter. With Yen and the pilot wounded, Frankie sacrifices himself and is shot dead by twin assassins Hansel and Gretel. The pair return to Cormac, but without the coin press. Winston, intent on revenge, takes Yen to the dojo and asks them to supply him with weapons.
| 2 | "Loyalty to the Master" | Charlotte Brändström | Teleplay by : Shawn Simmons and Greg Coolidge & Kirk Ward & Ken Kristensen; Story by : Greg Coolidge & Kirk Ward & Shawn Simmons | September 29, 2023 |
Vowing to avenge Frankie, Winston plans to destroy O'Connor by taking over the hotel. Winston assembles a team that includes Miles, Lou and Lemmy. Despite holding a grudge against Winston, Yen joins the team to avenge Frankie and provides a drawing of the hotel's layout. The High Table's Adjudicator visited the hotel and gave O'Connor a three day deadline to retrieve the press. Lou has a run in with the new Chinese Mafia boss, wanting to keep her father's dojo sacred to his memory and free of local gangland influence. Meanwhile, Charon writes to his father, whom O'Connor intends to bring to the States from Nigeria where Charon feels is safer. Thomas, the hotel cellist, plans to quit his job to study in a music conservatory in Ireland. He asks Charon to join him but Charon refuses, saying that he is loyal to O'Connor. Winston's team approaches Charon to recruit him, while O'Connor murders Thomas. At the hotel, Charon is shocked to see Thomas' corpse. O'Connor tells Charon that he intends to have Charon's father work in the hotel as the replacement when he arrives from Nigeria. Charon reveals that Winston Scott assembled a team to kill him.
| 3 | "Theatre of Pain" | Albert Hughes | Greg Coolidge & Kirk Ward & Ken Kristensen | October 6, 2023 |
Winston allies himself with Mazie, and offers an abandoned bank in return for some of her people for help in seizing the hotel. The Twins kidnap Winston and knock out Lou and KD, who appeared looking for him. Charon switches his allegiance and helps Winston escape from Cormac. The rest of the team enter the bank, with KD following behind. KD is actually the only survivor in the family that Frankie and Winston burned on Cormac's orders and wants to get revenge on them; Winston apologizes and escapes after Gene wounds her. Cormac goes to the secret 13th floor which has a control room. Realizing that her father built the dojo by killing the former tenants of the property, Lou bombs it and joins the team in the hotel. The team kill most of Cormac's people there, including the Twins. Cormac initiates the Defensionem protocol to destroy the hotel. He is caught by Winston and KD, who kills him after overhearing Cormac confess to deliberately setting up her family to be killed. Now knowing the truth, KD lets Winston go. Winston overrides the protocol and saves the hotel. The Adjudicator later congratulates Winston on taking over the hotel. Winston says that he found the press in the old car in which he and Frankie used to live as children and it is now behind Mazie's bank's vault. He then kills the Adjudicator in front of the hotel.

== Production ==
=== Development ===
While planning the story for John Wick: Chapter 3 – Parabellum in January 2017, Derek Kolstad and Chad Stahelski were also conceiving ideas for a prequel story, suggesting that a prequel would be best told in the form of a television series. In June 2017, the series was confirmed to be in full development, and the story would be called The Continental, focusing on the hotel that acts as a safe haven for assassins in the John Wick universe. Lionsgate gave the project an official green-light in January 2018 and planned for the series to air on its Starz network. Initial reports indicated Chris Collins would serve as showrunner.

Stahelski initially planned to direct the first episode of the series and stated that it would serve as an origin story for several of the characters in John Wick. In April 2021, Kevin Beggs, chairman of Lionsgate Television, said the team wanted to make sure that the series would add to the world-building of the John Wick universe without inhibiting any plans for future films. After hearing multiple pitches from different creative teams, Lionsgate settled on the approach presented by Greg Coolidge, Kirk Ward, and Shawn Simmons; and the format of the show was re-worked into an event series of three 90-minute episodes following a young Winston in the 1970s. The series was originally intended to comprise ten episodes; however, later the decision was changed in favour of the three episodes. Coolidge and Ward were named the new showrunners with additional executive producing help from Shawn Simmons, Paul Wernick, and Rhett Reese; and Albert Hughes and Charlotte Brändström were hired to direct.

=== Casting ===
In October 2021, the cast members were announced, starting with Mel Gibson, and followed by the rest of the lead cast including Colin Woodell as young Winston Scott from the main John Wick films. Additional casting announcements in November 2021 revealed that Peter Greene and Ayomide Adegun would portray younger versions of Uncle Charlie and Charon, respectively, and Jeremy Bobb was cast as a new character named Mayhew. In February 2022, roles were announced for Katie McGrath as the Adjudicator, Ray McKinnon, Adam Shapiro as Lemmy, as well as Mark Musashi and Marina Mazepa as Hansel and Gretel.

=== Filming ===
Principal photography began in November 2021 in Budapest, Hungary.

=== Post-production ===
In April 2023, the series working title of The Continental was finalized as The Continental: From the World of John Wick.

== Music ==
Raffertie was revealed to be composing the score for the series in April 2023. A soundtrack album for the series was digitally released by Lakeshore Records on September 22, with a vinyl edition set to be released on October 20.

The Continental: From the World of John Wick (Original Soundtrack)
| No. | Title | Length |
|---|---|---|
| 1. | "Persona Non Grata" | 1:49 |
| 2. | "Syringe" | 1:23 |
| 3. | "Us" | 1:32 |
| 4. | "Hansel & Gretel" | 1:13 |
| 5. | "Hallways" | 2:50 |
| 6. | "Tenement" | 1:50 |
| 7. | "Sacrifice" | 3:05 |
| 8. | "Crematorium" | 1:26 |
| 9. | "Saigon" | 1:15 |
| 10. | "Taking His House" | 3:22 |
| 11. | "Time For You to Feel Uncomfortable" | 1:53 |
| 12. | "My Apologies" | 0:46 |
| 13. | "Total Silence" | 4:13 |
| 14. | "High Risk High Reward" | 3:53 |
| 15. | "Loyalty to the Master" | 11:19 |
| 16. | "No Fidgeting" | 1:43 |
| 17. | "Disembark the Vehicle" | 1:01 |
| 18. | "Phone Booth" | 1:46 |
| 19. | "Fun Fumes" | 1:28 |
| 20. | "Rhodes Hotel" | 3:50 |
| 21. | "Phase One" | 5:34 |
| 22. | "Inimicus" | 5:52 |
| 23. | "Between Me and Him" | 1:20 |
| 24. | "Feel What They Felt" | 3:40 |
| 25. | "We All Go Now" | 1:45 |
| 26. | "Competitive Advantage" | 1:23 |
| 27. | "Rooftop" | 4:22 |
| 28. | "Structural Deformation" | 8:07 |
| 29. | "Interregnum" | 3:50 |
| Total length: | | 87:30 |

== Release ==
On August 15, 2022, Starz sold the series to Peacock. In March 2023, Lionsgate Motion Picture Group chair Joe Drake stated that the series was expected to be released in late 2023, also saying that the episodes were "nearly finished". In July 2023, it was announced that the series would premiere on September 22, 2023, on Peacock in the United States, and on Prime Video internationally.

== Reception ==
On review aggregator Rotten Tomatoes, The Continental: From the World of John Wick has an approval rating of 65% based on 85 reviews, with an average rating of 6.8 out of 10. The website's general consensus reads, "The Continental: From the World of John Wick offers some stylish action, although it'll be most satisfying for hardcore fans invested in further franchise world-building." Metacritic, which uses a weighted average, assigned the show a score of 53 out of 100, based on 27 critics, indicating "mixed or average reviews".

Angie Han of The Hollywood Reporter found it to be a decent show, apart from the casting of Gibson. Han felt that the rest of the cast had good chemistry, and intriguing backstory was introduced for some characters. She felt the format of the show had upsides and downsides, claiming that it was a bit too long for a film, yet too short to be a satisfying series. Likewise, the surrounding city felt constrained by its TV budget, and the intricate fight scenes were better than average for television, yet still fell short of the film levels.
