= Wick Is Pain =

- Film poster
- Directed by: Jeffrey Doe
- Produced by: Gabriel Roth; Matthew Sidle; Josh Oreck
- Starring: Keanu Reeves; Chad Stahelski; Basil Iwanyk
- Cinematography: Matthew Sidle; Bill Pope
- Edited by: Nick Bradford; Jeffrey Doe
- Production companies: Summit Entertainment; 87Eleven Entertainment; Narrator
- Distributed by: Lionsgate Films
- Release dates: May 8, 2025 (Beyond Fest); May 9, 2025
- Running time: 126 minutes
- Country: United States
- Language: English

Wick Is Pain is a 2025 American documentary film about the John Wick franchise. The documentary is directed by Jeffrey Doe. It premiered at Beyond Fest on May 8, 2025, and was released on digital platforms on May 9.

== Synopsis ==
Wick Is Pain was filmed over a decade and shows the behind-the-scenes reality of creating John Wick and its subsequent franchise films. It explores how Keanu, David, and Chad met, to how they were introduced to the original screenplay by Derek, titled Scorn, through to the fourth installment, John Wick: Chapter 4. The documentary outlines how the first movie was almost never made and details why two men, best known for their stunt choreography, and both first-time directors, turned out to be the right choice to direct the film.

== Featuring ==
- Keanu Reeves
- Chad Stahelski
- Basil Iwanyk
- David Leitch
- Tiger Chen
- Derek Kolstad

== Reception ==
On the review aggregator website Rotten Tomatoes, 100% of 15 critics' reviews are positive, with an average rating of 8.1/10.

Aidan Kelley of Collider gave the film a score of 9 out of 10, writing, "Wick Is Pain goes well beyond what one would immediately expect from a documentary about the making of John Wick. If you're looking to get a glimpse into how some of your favorite action sequences from the films were made, you'll get plenty of that and might even be surprised by the results. Where Wick Is Pain takes things a step further is with a deep dive into the difficulties of making a movie in general, not just a big flashy neon-laced action flick."

Brian Orndorf of Blu-ray.com gave the film a score of 8 out of 10 and wrote, "Wick Is Pain reaches a point of exhaustion, but it's a substantial odyssey into preparation and execution on a herculean level, offering a chance to understand how these movies were assembled, making for an engrossing sit."
