= Jessica Allain =

English actress and model (born 1997)

- Born: 17 February 1997 (age 29); London, England
- Other name: Jessica Williams
- Occupations: Actress and Model
- Years active: 2015–present

Jessica R. Williams or Jessica Allain (born 17 February 1997) is an English actress and model. She starred in the slasher film Thriller (2018). Her other films include The Laundromat (2019), Texas Chainsaw Massacre (2022), and Fear (2023). She is known for her role on television in the Peacock series The Continental (2023).

== Early life ==
Allain is from London. She was born to a Saint Lucian father and a Barbadian mother. She attended the Sylvia Young Theatre School. She began her career in modeling when she was sixteen.

== Career ==
Initially credited as Jessica Williams, she made her television and feature film debut in 2015 with minor roles in an episode of the Sky One sitcom Yonderland and the films Mission: Impossible – Rogue Nation and Eddie the Eagle. She also appeared in the "Catch Me If You Can" music video by Walking on Cars. Allain landed her first leading role as Lisa Walker in the 2018 slasher film Thriller. The following year, she played Simone in Steven Soderbergh's comedy-drama film The Laundromat about the Panama Papers. She had a small role in the independent superhero film Archenemy.

In 2022, Allain played Catherine in the ninth installment of the Texas Chainsaw Massacre franchise on Netflix. Allain appeared in the horror film Fear and the miniseries The Continental: From the World of John Wick, a three-part John Wick spin-off released on Peacock and Amazon Prime.

== Filmography ==
=== Film ===
Year	Title	Role	Notes
2015	I Know	Jessica	Short film
2015	Mission: Impossible – Rogue Nation	Stewardess	
2015	Eddie the Eagle	British Olympian	
2018	The Honor List	Head Morrisette	
2018	Thriller	Lisa Walker	
2019	CIROC: What Men Want	Diana	Short film
2019	The Laundromat	Simone	
2020	Two Eyes	Alasen	
2020	Archenemy	Melissa	
2022	Texas Chainsaw Massacre	Catherine	
2023	Fear	Meg	
2023	The Perfect Knight	Alie	Short film
TBA	Bando Stone and the New World		

=== Television ===
Year	Title	Role	Notes
2015	Yonderland	Girl	Episode: "Careful What You Wish For"
2023	The Continental: From the World of John Wick	Lou	Miniseries

=== Music videos ===
- Catch Me If You Can (2015), Walking on Cars
- Let Me Go (2023), Daniel Caesar
