= Lychees of Chang'an =

2021 historical novel by Ma Boyong

The Lychees of Chang'an
- Author: Ma Boyong
- Subject: History
- Publisher: Hunan Literature and Art Publishing House
- Pages: 224
- ISBN: 9787572608582

The Lychee(s) of Chang'an, or The Lychee(s) in Chang'an (Chinese: 长安的荔枝) is a historical novel written by Chinese author Ma Boyong and first published in the "Spring 2021" edition of the literary journal Harvest, in the long-form novel section. The full text consists of 70,000 words and was completed in 11 days. The novel has since been adapted into a film and a television series.

== Plot summary ==
Set during the Tianbao era of the Tang dynasty, the story follows Li Shande, a minor official in Shanglin Park, Chang'an. He is tasked with delivering fresh lychees from Lingnan to Chang'an in time for Yang Guifei's birthday. Faced with the challenge of the fruit's perishability and the difficulties of transportation, Li decides to take a gamble for the sake of his family. During the mission, he experiences both hardships and joy, while uncovering the crises of governance hidden beneath the grandeur of the Tang dynasty's golden age.

== Characters ==
- Li Shande, minor official at Shanglin Park, he unexpectedly receives the task of delivering fresh lychees. For the sake of his family, he resolutely decides to take on the mission.
- Liu Shuling, the magistrate of Shanglin Park; he is Li's superior.
- Han Cheng, principal officer in the Bibu Division of the Ministry of Justice and Li's friend.
- Du Fu, poet and Li's friend
- He Luguang, military commissioner of Lingnan who, fearing the emperor's distrust, schemes to frame Li.
- Zhao Xinning, Luguang's subordinate
- Su Liang, a Persian businessman who helps Li transport the lychees
- Tong, a girl who grows lychees
- Lin Yinu, Liguang's servant
- Yu Chao'en, a eunuch who initially intends to steal Li's research to gain fame and fortune for himself; he has to abandon the plan after Yang Guozhong intervenes.
- Yang Guozhong, imperial chancellor, he opens a channel to facilitate the delivery of lychees for Li.
- Gao Lishi, a eunuch formerly known as Feng Yuanyi, he recommends Lingnan lychees to the emperor and exempts Li from crime.
- Mrs. Li, Li's wife

== Reception ==
The book received widespread acclaim upon its publication, with over 100,000 ratings on Douban and a score of 8.5. It was ranked third in the "Douban 2022 Annual Chinese Literature (Fiction)" list and was praised for its portrayal of "great history through the lens of small characters".
