= John Wick =

American media franchise

- Official franchise logo
- Created by: Derek Kolstad
- Original work: John Wick (2014)
- Owner: Lionsgate Studios
- Years: 2014–present

Print publications
- Comics: John Wick: The Book of Rules (2017–2019)

Films and television
- Films: Original series: John Wick: Chapter 1 (2014); John Wick: Chapter 2 (2017); John Wick: Chapter 3 – Parabellum (2019); John Wick: Chapter 4 (2023); John Wick: Chapter 5 (TBA); Spin-off: Ballerina (2025); Second spin-off: Caine (TBA)
- Television series: The Continental: From the World of John Wick (2023)

Games
- Video games: John Wick Chronicles (2017); John Wick Hex (2019); Untitled John Wick Game (TBA)

Audio
- Soundtracks: John Wick: Chapter 1 (2014); John Wick: Chapter 2 (2017); John Wick: Chapter 3 – Parabellum (2019); John Wick: Chapter 4 (2023); Ballerina (2025)

Official website
- johnwick.movie

John Wick is an American media franchise created by Derek Kolstad. It centers on a neo-noir action thriller film series directed by Chad Stahelski featuring Keanu Reeves as Wick. Wick is a legendary hitman who is reluctantly drawn back into the criminal underworld after retiring. The franchise began with the release of John Wick: Chapter 1 (2014), which was followed by three sequels: Chapter 2 (2017), Chapter 3 – Parabellum (2019), and Chapter 4 (2023). Various spin-offs expanded the franchise: the prequel comic book series John Wick: The Book of Rules (2017–2019), the prequel television miniseries The Continental (2023), and the spin-off film Ballerina (2025).

The films have received critical acclaim and have been considered one of the greatest action film series of all time. Some critics and publications consider the first film, (Note: Attributed to multiple references:) as well as Chapter 4, as two of the greatest action films ever made. The films have earned a collective gross of more than $1 billion worldwide.

Stahelski, Basil Iwanyk, and Erica Lee serve in oversight roles for the John Wick franchise. 87North Productions, Thunder Road Films, and Lionsgate produce the franchise.

== Films ==
| Film | U.S. release date | Director(s) | Screenwriter(s) | Story by | Producer(s) | Status |
|---|---|---|---|---|---|---|
| John Wick: Chapter 1 | October 24, 2014 | Chad Stahelski (Note: Chad Stahelski and David Leitch co-directed the first film, but the Directors Guild of America awarded sole directorial credit to Stahelski; Leitch instead received accreditation as a producer.) | Derek Kolstad | Derek Kolstad | Basil Iwanyk, David Leitch, Eva Longoria and Michael Witherill | Released |
| John Wick: Chapter 2 | February 10, 2017 | Chad Stahelski | Derek Kolstad | Derek Kolstad | Basil Iwanyk and Erica Lee | Released |
| John Wick: Chapter 3 – Parabellum | May 17, 2019 | Chad Stahelski | Marc Abrams, Shay Hatten, Derek Kolstad & Chris Collins | Derek Kolstad | Basil Iwanyk and Erica Lee | Released |
| John Wick: Chapter 4 | March 24, 2023 | Chad Stahelski | Shay Hatten & Michael Finch | Shay Hatten & Michael Finch | Basil Iwanyk, Erica Lee, and Chad Stahelski | Released |
| From the World of John Wick: Ballerina | June 6, 2025 | Len Wiseman (Note: Chad Stahelski is uncredited as the director of reshoots, having overseen major additions to the movie without Wiseman's involvement.) | Shay Hatten (Note: Rebecca Angelo, Lauren Schuker Blum, Emerald Fennell, Michael Finch and Len Wiseman are credited by the Writers Guild of America West with "additional literary material (not on-screen)".) | Shay Hatten | Basil Iwanyk, Erica Lee, and Chad Stahelski | Released |

=== John Wick: Chapter 1 (2014) ===
John Wick is a retired assassin who returns to his old ways after a group of Russian gangsters steal his car and kill his puppy which was given to him by his late wife Helen.

The film was developed in 2012. Principal photography began on September 25, 2013, and wrapped on December 20, 2013.

=== John Wick: Chapter 2 (2017) ===
Forced to honor a debt from his past life, John Wick is sent to assassinate a target he has no wish to kill, where he faces betrayal at the hands of his sponsor.

Principal photography began on October 26, 2015. The film premiered in February 2017.

=== John Wick: Chapter 3 – Parabellum (2019) ===
John Wick is declared excommunicado after killing an international crime lord on Continental grounds, where he sets out to save himself from bounty hunters and assassins.

The third film was announced in October 2016, production began in early 2018, and it was released in May 2019.

=== John Wick: Chapter 4 (2023) ===
John Wick takes his fight against the High Table global as he seeks out more powerful players in the underworld from different countries.

In May 2019, before the release of John Wick: Chapter 3 – Parabellum, Chad Stahelski confirmed on a Reddit "Ask Me Anything" thread that discussion of another film had arisen. Keanu Reeves had also stated that he would continue as long as the films are successful. Lionsgate announced the film during John Wick 3's opening week, with a scheduled release date of May 21, 2021. In April 2020, though, during an interview with Collider, Stahelski revealed that the film would most likely not make its 2021 release date due to his commitment to The Matrix Resurrections. He also revealed, during the same interview, that a 100-page "scriptment" (part script/part outline) had been written for the film. The screenplay was written by Shay Hatten and Michael Finch, as the studio decided to move on from series creator Derek Kolstad. Production was due to commence in June 2021 in Paris and Berlin, with additional filming in Japan and New York City. Partly due to the COVID-19 pandemic, the film was released on March 24, 2023. In June 2021, Donnie Yen, Rina Sawayama, Shamier Anderson, Bill Skarsgård, and Hiroyuki Sanada joined the cast. Principal photography began on June 28, 2021. In October 2021, principal photography had wrapped.

=== From the World of John Wick: Ballerina (2025) ===
In July 2017, Lionsgate announced the development of a spinoff film written by Shay Hatten and titled Ballerina. The studio intends to expand the franchise with installments set within the same fictional world. The story, written as a speculative script based on Hatten's love for the John Wick films before being purchased by Lionsgate, involves a young woman who is raised to be an assassin, and seeks revenge on the hitmen who killed her family. Basil Iwanyk and Erica Lee were to serve as producers. The project was to be developed by Thunder Road Films.

In October 2019, Len Wiseman signed onto the project as director, with Keanu Reeves and Chad Stahelski serving as executive producer and producer, respectively. The film would follow the same ballerina character previously portrayed by Unity Phelan in John Wick: Chapter 3 – Parabellum. In May 2020, Stahelski stated that Wiseman had read the script earlier, and approached the studio with a pitch of how he would develop the project, based on Hatten's draft, for which the proof of concept had previously been uploaded to YouTube in September 2017. Stahelski met with Wiseman and approached executives to hire the filmmaker. He confirmed that his team and he would work closely with Wiseman on the action sequences and stunts for the film, while acknowledging that Wiseman's filmmaking style would add variety to the franchise. At that point, Wiseman and Hatten were working on a newer draft of the script. In May 2020, it was reported that the studio was looking for an actress, with Chloë Grace Moretz as the template for the kind of talent for whom they were looking. In October 2021, Ana de Armas entered early negotiations to portray the eponymous character. By April 2022 at CinemaCon, Lionsgate announced that de Armas would star in the lead role, with principal photography to commence later that year. In July of the same year, de Armas was revealed to have personally selected Emerald Fennell to contribute to the script as one of its writers.

In September 2022, principal photography was announced to have been delayed from its previous tentative start and would commence later that fall. In November 2022, principal photography was scheduled to begin imminently. Reprising roles were announced for Ian McShane and Keanu Reeves as Winston Scott and John Wick, respectively, followed by Anjelica Huston as The Director and Lance Reddick as Charon. Filming began on November 7, 2022, in Prague, Czech Republic. The movie's official title was announced as From the World of John Wick: Ballerina, with the release of its trailer in September 2024.

Ballerina was released in the United States on June 6, 2025. It was delayed from a June 7, 2024, release.

=== Future ===
==== Caine (TBA) ====
In March 2023, producer Erica Lee stated that the studio is working on an as-of-yet untitled film that will further expand the franchise. Though she would not disclose any details at the time, she stated that it would be announced within the upcoming months. Erica Lee expressed interest in a project centered around the backstory of the character portrayed by Rina Sawayama, named Akira. She later clarified that she personally is interested in seeing a spin-off featuring the character become a reality. In March 2023, Donnie Yen expressed interest in reprising his role from Chapter 4 in a potential spin-off centered around his character Caine. The actors stated there are discussions for such a reprisal, serving as a continuation of Chapter 4's post-credits scene, depicting Akira seeking revenge by hunting Caine. In November of the same year, Stahelski confirmed that there are projects in development that will further explore the story included in the post-credits of the fourth film. In May 2024, it was officially announced that a spin-off film centered around Caine was in development, with Yen reprising his role as the titular character. The script, written by Robert Askins, will explore the continuing story that chronologically follows the final scene of John Wick: Chapter 4. Chad Stahelski, Basil Iwanyk, and Erica Lee will serve as producers. The trio will oversee the movie, continuing their developmental roles at Lionsgate for all John Wick franchise installments. Principal photography was planned to commence in Hong Kong in 2025. By October of the same year, Stahelski confirmed that the untitled movie is currently in development, and that it will be one of the next John Wick projects to be produced.

Lionsgate officially announced the project in April 2025 at CinemaCon, with Donnie Yen serving as director in addition to reprising the role from John Wick: Chapter 4, while Mattson Tomlin will write a new draft of the previous draft written by Askins, which was based on a pitch from Stahelski and Yen; Yen will serve as an executive producer; while Stahelski will oversee production in his franchise role at Lionsgate. The story will follow the character released from his role with the High Table and take place chronologically after the events of Chapter 4. Rina Sawayama was confirmed to reprise her role as Akira the following month. The project is described as a modern-day classic Hong Kong-style kung-fu movie, and will be a joint-venture production between Lionsgate, Thunder Road Films, and 87Eleven Entertainment. Production was scheduled for April 2026. The movie's full title was revealed as From the World of John Wick: Caine that month, with principal photography commencing on April 25.

==== John Wick: Chapter 5 (TBA) ====
In August 2020, Lionsgate CEO Jon Feltheimer confirmed that a fifth film was also being developed. It was intended to be shot back-to-back with the fourth installment in early 2021, but in March 2021, Lionsgate opted to delay production and move forward with Chapter 4 first. In May 2022, Stahelski stated that while Chapter 4 has some "conclusion" elements to the story, there would be a fifth installment to the franchise. Stahelski stated that though Chapters 4 and 5 were originally intended to be filmed back-to-back, he didn't feel like he could create two meaningfully successful and separate installments, without some time between each project to grow as a filmmaker; stating that once Chapter 4 is released months later in Japan, he and Reeves will discuss and map out the future of the John Wick movies. He also confirmed that he and Reeves will remain involved in the additional projects of the franchise that are currently in development, though the premise for Chapter 5 is not mapped out yet. Later that same month, following the financial and critical success of Chapter 4, producer Erica Lee stated she was hopeful for a fifth film among projects expanding the universe currently in development. By November 2023 following the resolution of the writers and actors strikes, Lionsgate revealed that work on the script for the fifth film had officially resumed.

In October 2024, Stahelski stated that the script had gone through various iterations, but that it would not move forward until he, Reeves, Iwanyk, and Lee were satisfied with the story. The filmmaker revealed that the project would not continue directly from Chapter 4, but will be a separate storyline. By April 2025, the movie was officially announced at CinemaCon. Reeves will reprise the eponymous role, and Stahelski will direct. Basil Iwanyk, Erica Lee, Stahelski, and Reeves will serve as producers. The following month, Stahelski explained that the plot will not feature the High Table, and will instead see Wick facing new threats, after completing his confrontations with the previous organization. The project will be a joint-venture production between Lionsgate, Thunder Road Films, and 87Eleven Entertainment.

==== Untitled animated prequel film (TBA) ====
In November 2023, Stahelski announced that an anime-styled animated project was in development. Initially conceptualized as a television series, the filmmaker stated that it would feature stories that the creatives believe will be represented best through the Japanese art style. In October 2024, Stahelski revealed that the project would now be released as a feature film, and that it will be one of the next installments released in the John Wick franchise. Expressing excitement that the franchise would be explored through a different style, the filmmaker stated that the plot will take place chronologically before the events of the first movie, and depict the character's legendary "impossible task" that had allowed him to leave the High Table to be married; an event which was referenced in previous movies.

Lionsgate officially green-lit the project in April 2025 at CinemaCon, with Reeves confirmed to reprise the lead role through voice acting performance. Shannon Tindle directs the film from a script written by Vanessa Taylor. The plot was confirmed to take place chronologically before the first movie, while Basil Iwanyk, Erica Lee, Chad Stahelski, and Reeves served as producers. The project will be a joint-venture between Lionsgate, Thunder Road Films, and 87Eleven Entertainment. In November 2026, the film was confirmed to be in the works, the script will be written by Ryan and Kaz Firpo, and Point Grey Pictures has joined as producers

=== Other potential projects ===
Lionsgate has some additional projects in various stages of development, set within the same fictional continuity as the John Wick films. In March 2023, producer Erica Lee stated that in addition to previously identified projects, there are "... lots of other things. But we're developing a lot of stuff and having a lot of discussions with a lot of writers and brand management and Wick... is my utmost priority." Stahelski has expressed interest in seeing additional actors join the franchise, such as: Cillian Murphy, Jet Li, Jackie Chan, Bob Odenkirk, Jason Statham, Sylvester Stallone, Clint Eastwood, Jason Momoa, Matt Damon, Chris Hemsworth, Colin Farrell, Charlize Theron, Michelle Yeoh, Peter Dinklage, Jurnee Smollett, Robert Downey Jr., Sean Bean, Jeff Wincott, Jeff Speakman, Tyrese Gibson, Ludacris, Jamie Foxx and Brad Pitt. Stahelski, Leitch, and Lee additionally expressed interest in having John Leguizamo, David Patrick Kelly, Thomas Sadoski, Common, and Willem Dafoe reprise their supporting roles in the future. Lee stated that with various projects in development, the studio may develop some prequel installments as well. That same month, Natalia Tena expressed interest in reprising her role as Wick's adoptive cousin/surrogate sister Katia, in future installments of the franchise. In November 2023, Stahelski confirmed that multiple projects were in development, while acknowledging that there are plans to explore the various criminal organization establishments within the continuity; including Italian, French, Japanese, Chinese, Middle-Eastern, Indonesian, and Russian cultures. Later following the resolutions to the 2023 writers and actors strikes, Lionsgate officially announced that work on various spin-off projects had commenced.

- Atomic Blonde crossover: In July 2017, David Leitch was asked about the potential for a crossover involving the franchise's eponymous killer and Lorraine Broughton. Leitch directed the latter project after co-directing John Wick. The filmmaker stated that it sounded like a great idea. In November 2024, Leitch said that it was "fun to think about".
- Nobody crossover: In March 2021, Kolstad was asked about the potential for a crossover between the John Wick franchise and Nobody. As the films are distributed by different companies (Lionsgate and Universal, respectively), Kolstad indicated this was unlikely and stated the franchises were "very different"; at most, he would like to see it done in a small and subtle Easter egg-reference manner. Later that month, director Ilya Naishuller was asked about a potential crossover and, pointing out that two different studios are involved, said "That's all I'll say. I mean, everything's possible. Stranger things have definitely happened, but... yeah." In June 2021, Kolstad stated that if there were any crossover, he would prefer it in a minimalist fashion, and opined that he would prefer John Wick and Hutch Mansell be on the same side should the characters share more screen time.
- Sofia: In February 2022, Halle Berry stated that though a spin-off film centering around her role as Jinx from the James Bond installment Die Another Day never materialized, there is ongoing discussions for a film featuring her character Sofia from John Wick: Chapter 3 – Parabellum. In March 2023, producer Erica Lee stated that future projects will explore the recurring theme of dogs within the franchise, including Halle Berry's role as Sofia. Later that month, Shamier Anderson stated that the background story of his character from John Wick: Chapter 4 includes having a familial relationship to Berry's character. The actor confirmed discussions for the potential of his character to appear in additional installments of the franchise, while expressing interest in doing so. In November of the same year, Stahelski confirmed that a project including the two characters is in development. By September 2024, Berry confirmed that there had been discussions for her to reprise the role while expressing interest in doing so. In October 2024, Stahelski expressed interest in working with Berry again in the future.
- The Bowery King: In March 2023, Lee expressed interest in exploring a film that more greatly explores the history of The Bowery King, portrayed in the franchise by Laurence Fishburne. She later stated that she has personal interest in realizing a project that features the character and his backstory. In November of the same year, Stahelski confirmed that there are projects in development which will include the Bowery King, and his homeless criminal organization.
- Ballerina sequel: In March 2023, producer Erica Lee stated that the studio has tentative plans to develop a sequel to Ballerina (2025), with Ana de Armas set to reprise her role.
- Untitled film: In October 2025, it was revealed that Austin Everett wrote a script described as a Samurai-Western, which is intended to be set within the same continuity as the John Wick franchise.

== Television ==
| Series | Season | Episodes | Originally released | | | Showrunner(s) |
| Series | Season | Episodes | First released | Last released | Network | Showrunner(s) |
|---|---|---|---|---|---|---|
| The Continental: From the World of John Wick | 1 | 3 | September 22, 2023 | October 6, 2023 | Peacock | Greg Coolidge and Kirk Ward |

=== The Continental: From the World of John Wick (2023) ===
In June 2017, Chad Stahelski and Derek Kolstad were announced to be developing a television series for Lionsgate based on the characters and setting of the John Wick films, tentatively titled The Continental. The series was reported to center around the hotel safe-haven for hit men and assassins, which features in the films. It was reported that Reeves would reprise his role. That same month, it was announced that the series would be a prequel to the film series that takes place years prior to the events of the films.

In April 2021, chairman of Lionsgate Television Kevin Beggs announced that the series will center around a young Winston in the 1970s. The series will explore real-world events, including the Great Garbage Strike and the American Mafia's rise to economic power. He announced that the project's plot had been difficult to develop, with the studio having taken various pitches from different creative teams, before the creators of Wayne presented the concept that they settled upon: three 90-minute episodes, making The Continental a limited series. In October 2021, it was announced that Mel Gibson would star in the series, with Colin Woodell cast as a young Winston Scott. Hubert Point-Du Jour, Jessica Allain, Mishel Prada, Nhung Kate, and Ben Robson were also added to the cast. In November 2021, Ayomide Adegun, Peter Greene, and Jeremy Bobb joined the cast as a young Charon, a younger Uncle Charlie, and a new character named Mayhew, respectively. In February 2022, it was announced that Katie McGrath was cast as The Adjudicator.

In August 2022, Lionsgate announced it had sold premiere rights to the series to Peacock, having determined the series was no longer a fit for Starz. It was then expected to premiere in 2023. In March 2023, Lionsgate Motion Picture Group chair Joe Drake stated that the series is expected to release later in the year, also saying that the episodes are "nearly finished". The series was officially titled The Continental: From the World of John Wick, in April 2023, and was released between September 22 and October 6, 2023.

=== John Wick: Under the High Table (TBA) ===
In November 2023, Chad Stahelski revealed that developments are underway for another spin-off television series. The filmmaker stated that he intends to direct a number of the episodes, while revealing that the show will not include the character of Wick in its plot. Later that month, the filmmaker stated that through the television show the various cultures of the world will be explored through the John Wick franchise. In another interview, he stated that the series is being developed to feature the supporting cast from the feature films in starring roles; while identifying Caine, Shimazu Akira, The Tracker / Mr. Nobody as characters who may appear. In January 2024, Stahelski stated that development for the series is ongoing with a tentative debut slated for an unspecified date in the following year. While acknowledging that he and Reeves had only had minor input for The Continental, he reiterated his involvement in creating the next show, stating that various characters from the films would feature in its story.

In August 2024, the series was officially greenlit with the title John Wick: Under the High Table, and will be shopped around to various streaming companies; with Robert Levine serving as showrunner, writer, and executive producer. The show will be overseen collaboratively by Chad Stahelski, Basil Iwanyk, Erica Lee, and Keanu Reeves; each of who serve as additional executive producers. Stahelski will additionally direct the pilot episode. The plot of the series will take place chronologically after the events of Chapter 4 and will follow new characters who strive to usurp the High Table, while returning cast members of the franchise seek to maintain the current order. The project will be a joint-venture production between Lionsgate Television, 87Eleven Entertainment, and Thunder Road Studios. In October of the same year, Stahelski stated that the show would explore various members of the supporting cast within the John Wick franchise.

== Premise ==
John Wick (Keanu Reeves) was born Jardani Jovonovich in Belarus. He was an orphan who was taken in by the Ruska Roma crime syndicate, where he was raised as an assassin, eventually rising to become the top enforcer of the Russian Mafia and known as "Baba Yaga" ("the one you sent to kill [the] Boogeyman") under crime boss Viggo Tarasov (Michael Nyqvist), who deemed him so ruthless that many came to respect and fear him. At the beginning of the first film, Wick has been retired from being a hitman for five years after undertaking an "impossible task" for Tarasov, wiping out all other organized crime syndicates in New York City in order to be allowed to leave to marry Helen (Bridget Moynahan) before her eventual death from cancer, leaving him known as a legend in the assassin underworld worldwide.

World of John Wick story chronology
- The Continental: From the World of John Wick (2023)
- John Wick (2017–2018)
- John Wick Hex (2019)
- John Wick: Chapter 1 (2014)
- John Wick: Chapter 2 (2017)
- John Wick: Chapter 3 – Parabellum (2019)
- From the World of John Wick: Ballerina (2025)
- John Wick: Chapter 4 (2023)

Every assassin in the world sticks to a strict code for conducting "business", revolving around the Continental hotel chain, which serves as neutral ground for the underworld, where all "business" is strictly forbidden on all its properties, with each manager—including Winston Scott (Ian McShane), Sofia Al-Azwar (Halle Berry), Julius (Franco Nero), and Shimazu Koji (Hiroyuki Sanada)—swearing their fealty to the High Table, a council of twelve high-level leaders of world society, while paying for services within the underworld with specialized gold coins, used as both fiscal currency to acquire goods and services and ethical currency for honor-bound favors—a specific variety of which, a "marker", binds one's soul to an unbreakable blood oath between two individuals in exchange for a specific task undertaken by each party for the other, for which one serves as the "bearer" until the day on which they intend to claim the favor owed. Every assassin is bound to follow two rules, or risk being made "excommunicado" if broken:

1. No business is to be conducted on Continental grounds
2. Every marker must be honored

Only under very rare circumstances may these rules be side-stepped, such as if a Continental Hotel is "deconsecrated", or if someone attempts to violate Continental rules, forcing their target to defend themselves while still on Continental grounds.

== Cast and characters ==
List indicators

This section includes characters who will appear or have appeared in the franchise in main roles.

- An empty grey cell indicates the character was not in the film, or that the character's official presence has not yet been confirmed.
- ^{A} indicates an appearance through archival footage or audio.
- ^{C} indicates a cameo role.
- ^{P} indicates an appearance in onscreen photographs.
- ^{S} indicates an appearance through use of special effects.
- ^{V} indicates a voice-only role.
- ^{Y} indicates a younger version of the character.

| Character | Films | | | | | | Television |
| Character | John Wick: Chapter 1 | John Wick: Chapter 2 | John Wick: Chapter 3 – Parabellum | John Wick: Chapter 4 | From the World of John Wick: Ballerina | Caine | The Continental: From the World of John Wick |
Main cast
| Jardani Jovonovich / Jonathan "John" Wick (Note: Also referred to by other assassins through various aliases, including but not limited to: "Baba Yaga", "The Boogeyman", and "The Devil".) | Keanu Reeves | Keanu Reeves | Keanu Reeves | Keanu Reeves | Keanu Reeves | | |
| Winston Scott | Ian McShane | Ian McShane | Ian McShane | Ian McShane | Ian McShane | | Colin Woodell Fflyn Edwards^{Y} |
| Charon O'Connor | Lance Reddick | Lance Reddick | Lance Reddick | Lance Reddick | Lance Reddick | | Ayomide Adegun |
| Marcus | Willem Dafoe | | | | | | |
| Viggo Tarasov | Michael Nyqvist | | | | | | |
| Iosef Tarasov | Alfie Allen | | | | | | |
| King The Bowery King (Note: Also known simply as "The Bowery".) | | Laurence Fishburne | Laurence Fishburne | Laurence Fishburne | | | |
| Santino D'Antonio | | Riccardo Scamarcio | Riccardo Scamarcio^{C}^{S} | | | | |
| Ares | | Ruby Rose | | | | | |
| Cassian | | Common | | | | | |
| Sofia Al-Azwar | | | Halle Berry | | | | |
| The Elder | | | Saïd Taghmaoui | George Georgiou (Note: Georgiou portrays a successor to the previous holder of the title portrayed by Taghmaoui; informing John Wick that "your ring, like the Elder before me, is gone".) | | | |
| The Adjudicator | | | Asia Kate Dillon | | | | Katie McGrath (Note: McGrath portrays a predecessor to the Adjudicator previously portrayed by Dillon.) |
| The Director | | | Anjelica Huston | | Anjelica Huston | | |
| Caine | | | | Donnie Yen | | Donnie Yen | |
| The Marquis Vincent Bisset de Gramont | | | | Bill Skarsgård | | | |
| Shimazu Akira | | | | Rina Sawayama | | Rina Sawayama | |
| Mia | | | | Aimee Kwan^{C} | | Zhuang Dafei | |
| Eve Macarro the Ballerina | | | | | Ana de Armas Victoria Comte^{Y} | | |
| The Chancellor Mr. Pine | | | | | Gabriel Byrne | | |
| Cormac O'Connor | | | | | | | Mel Gibson |
Supporting cast
| Helen Wick | Bridget Moynahan | Bridget Moynahan | Bridget Moynahan^{P} | Bridget Moynahan^{A} | | | |
| Uncle Charlie | David Patrick Kelly | David Patrick Kelly | | | | | Peter Greene |
| Aurelio | John Leguizamo | John Leguizamo | | | | | |
| Jimmy | Thomas Sadoski | Thomas Sadoski | | | | | |
| The Doctor | Randall Duk Kim | | Randall Duk Kim | | | | |
| Ms. Perkins | Adrianne Palicki | | | | | | |
| Avi | Dean Winters | | | | | | |
| Earl | | Tobias Segal | Tobias Segal | | | | |
| Abram Tarasov | | Peter Stormare | | | | | |
| Julius | | Franco Nero | | | | | |
| Gianna D'Antonio | | Claudia Gerini | | | | | |
| Zero | | | Mark Dacascos | | | | |
| Berrada | | | Jerome Flynn | | | | |
| The Librarian | | | Susan Blommaert | | | | |
| The Operator | | | Margaret Daly | | | | |
| The Administrator | | | Robin Lord Taylor | | | | |
| Tick-Tock Man | | | Jason Mantzoukas | | | | |
| The Tracker Mr. Nobody | | | | Shamier Anderson | | | |
| Shimazu Koji | | | | Hiroyuki Sanada | | | |
| Killa Harkan | | | | Scott Adkins | | | |
| The Harbinger | | | | Clancy Brown | | | |
| Katia Jovanovich | | | | Natalia Tena | | | |
| Lena Macarro | | | | | Catalina Sandino Moreno | | |
| Daniel Pine | | | | | Norman Reedus | | |
| Nogi | | | | | Sharon Duncan-Brewster | | |
| Katla Park | | | | | Choi Soo-young | | |
| Javier Macarro | | | | | David Castañeda | | |
| Ella Pine | | | | | Ava McCarthy | | |
| KD "Kady" di Silva | | | | | | | Mishel Prada |
| Francis Patrick "Frankie" Scott Jr. | | | | | | | Ben Robson Ben Robinson^{Y} |
| Miles Burton | | | | | | | Hubert Point-Du Jour |
| Yen Scott | | | | | | | Nhung Kate |
| Lou Burton | | | | | | | Jessica Allain |
| Mayhew | | | | | | | Jeremy Bobb |

== Development ==
The premise for John Wick was conceived by screenwriter Derek Kolstad, who began work on a treatment about a retired contract killer coming out to seek vengeance, entitled Scorn. After one month of work, he had completed the first draft of the screenplay. After addressing several issues he pitched the script to various clients, garnering at least three offers. When he first began to think about writing the script, Kolstad was influenced by film-noir classics, and the themes of revenge and the antihero. Kolstad explained that he tried to "explore what would happen if the worst man in existence found salvation [... and] when the source of his salvation is ripped from him, what happens? Do the gates of Hades open?"

In December 2012, Thunder Road Pictures had bought the script with discretionary funds, with Kolstad agreeing to Thunder Road's plan to make the film straight away. When Basil Iwanyk, head of Thunder Road Pictures, had first read Kolstad's original screenplay, he was immediately drawn to the main character of Wick, stating: "The tone of the script was subversive and really fun". He also admired the emotional weight and action elements of the piece. After Thunder Road had optioned the script, Kolstad spent additional months rewriting the script with them. In the original script, the character of John Wick was written with "a man in his mid-sixties" to play the role, given the title character's fabled reputation as a revered and respected assassin. However, Iwanyk believed that this was irrelevant and bent the original vision ever so slightly, stating: "Instead, we decided to look for someone who is not literally older, but who has a seasoned history in the film world".

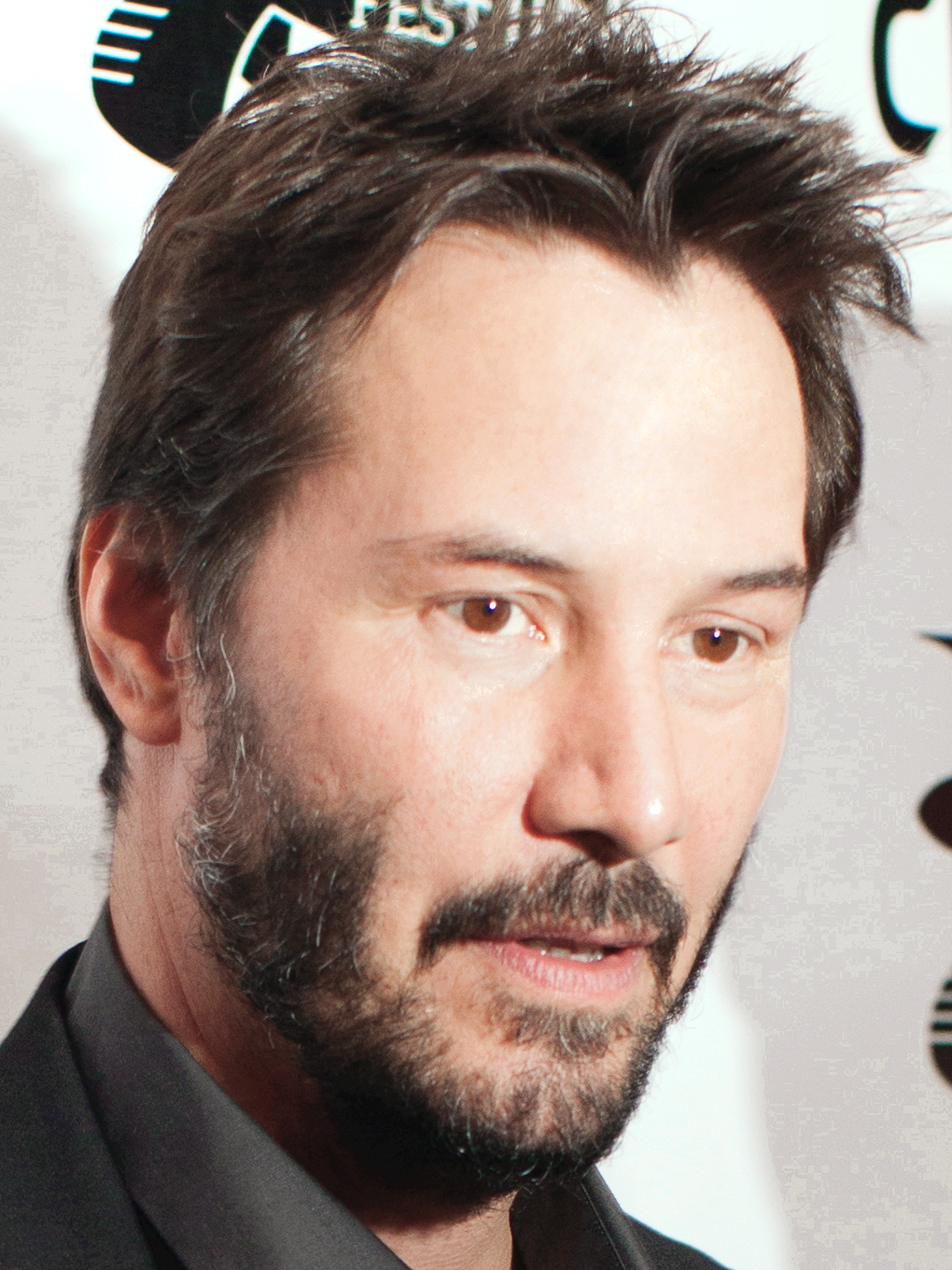
Keanu Reeves in 2014

In 2013, Keanu Reeves secured the film's male lead. After Iwanyk and Peter Lawson of Thunder Road showed him the script, he thought it to be full of potential and stated: "I love the role but you want the whole story, the whole ensemble to come to life". Reeves and Kolstad worked closely together on further developing the screenplay and the story, with the screenwriter describing: "We spent as much time developing the other characters as we did his. [Keanu] recognizes that the strength of the storyline lies in even the smallest details". The title of the film was later changed from Scorn to John Wick, as according to Kolstad, "Keanu liked the name so much, that Reeves kept telling everyone that he was making a film called 'John Wick'", and the producers agreed, changing the title.

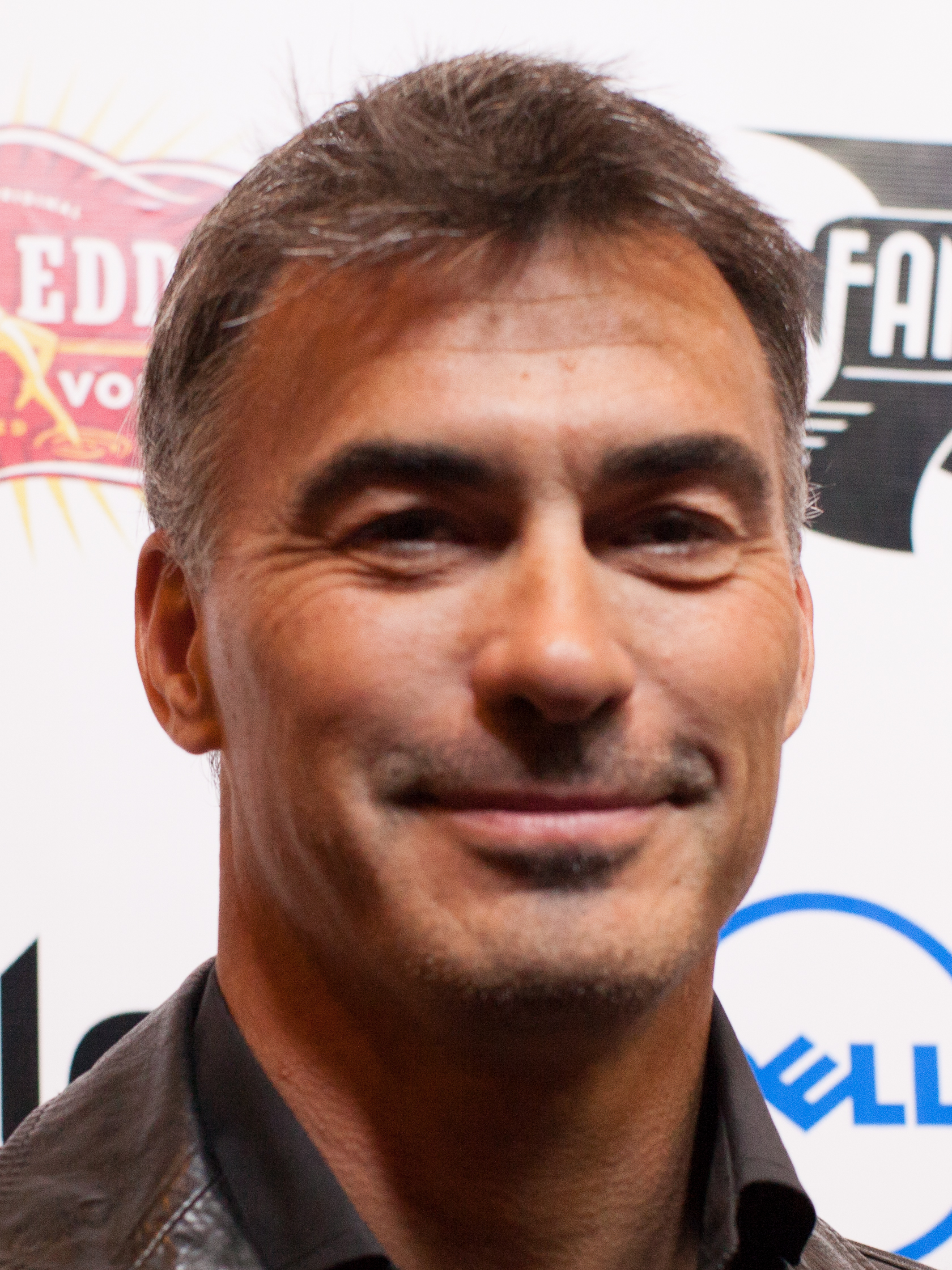
Chad Stahelski in 2014

During story discussions for John Wick, Reeves contacted Chad Stahelski and David Leitch, whom he originally met on the set of The Matrix, to see if they were interested in choreographing or directing the action of the piece. Reeves admired Stahelski and Leitch's work performing, choreographing and coordinating, stating that, "when I got the script...I immediately thought of Chad and Dave for the action design, but I was secretly hoping they'd want to direct it". He later added: "I knew that they would love the genre and I knew that they would love John Wick. And I thought the worlds that get created – the real world and then this underworld – would be attractive to them, and it was". After reading Kolstad's script, Stahelski and Leitch told Reeves they wanted to tell the story of John Wick, as they both had a desire to get involved with a project as directors. Impressed with Reeves' enthusiasm and the quality of the script, Stahelski and Leitch told him that they wished to direct the film and later presented him with their version of the story which was based on "[...] the idea of [Wick] as an urban legend, a thriller assassin movie with a realistic vibe and an otherworldly setting". Impressed with their concept, Reeves supported the pair, and Stahelski and Leitch pitched the idea to the studio, who hired them to direct, contrary to their initial request of directing the film's second unit. In May 2013, Stahelski and Leitch came to direct the film together as a team, though it was later ruled by the Directors Guild of America that only Stahelski would be given the director credit. Leitch was credited as a producer.

Principal photography for the first film began in New York City, with an original shooting schedule from September 25 to December 5, 2013, and the filming process scheduled to continue in and around New York City and the greater New York area.

In February 2015, directors Stahelski and Leitch stated that a John Wick sequel had begun development, which was later titled John Wick: Chapter 2. The same month, Lionsgate CEO Jon Feltheimer stated during a conference call that they see John Wick as a multiple-title action franchise. Additionally, it was reported that Kolstad would return to write the screenplay. In May 2015, it was confirmed that a sequel was green-lit, and Lionsgate would be selling the film at the Cannes Film Festival. Principal photography on the film began on October 26, 2015, in New York City. It would later move to Rome, and eventually resume in Montreal, Canada on October 27, 2016.

In October 2016, Stahelski stated a third film was in development. In June 2017, it was reported that Kolstad would return again to write the screenplay for the third film. In September 2017, Lionsgate announced a release date of May 17, 2019. In January 2018, it was reported that Chad Stahelski was returning to direct the film and Common, Laurence Fishburne, and Ruby Rose were set to reprise their roles from the second film. Additionally, it was announced that Hiroyuki Sanada had been cast as the film's antagonist. The film began production in early 2018. On May 21, 2018, it was reported that Halle Berry, Asia Kate Dillon, Anjelica Huston, Mark Dacascos and Jason Mantzoukas had joined the cast.

=== Cinematic inspiration ===
Director Chad Stahelski cited several action films as influences for the series, including Akira Kurosawa films, Sergio Leone's The Good, the Bad and the Ugly (1966), Le Samouraï, Point Blank (1967), Le Cercle Rouge (1970), and John Woo films such as The Killer (1989).

About The Good, the Bad and the Ugly, Stahelski said, "Look at Clint Eastwood in [the film] – there is so much back-story unsaid there. We're big fans of leaving it to your imagination. We just give you some gold coins, and then it's, 'Where do the gold coins come from?' We'll get to that eventually. Have your imagination do some work there." He also said Point Blank influenced John Wick: "One of the biggest inspirations for the film was Point Blank. We watched it on a loop in our office, and there are a couple of homages to that [in John Wick]." Park Chan-wook's The Vengeance Trilogy (2002–2005) and Lee Jeong-beom's The Man from Nowhere (2010) influenced the film due to "[their] minimalist composition and graphic nature."

Alistair MacLean and Stephen King were huge influences in the creation of the story of John Wick in terms of characterization and world-building, with screenwriter Derek Kolstad stating, "MacLean could build a world, and King could surprise you by what the main character truly was capable of." Outside of films, Stahelski and Leitch drew inspiration from the visual stylings of the '60s and '70s as well as cinematic influences, including Sergio Leone, Akira Kurosawa, Steve McQueen, Lee Marvin, William Friedkin and Sam Peckinpah. Stahelski himself said, "All the way back to Kurosawa up to Sergio Leone. We like the Spaghetti Western sensibility there, some of the composition." About inspiration and emulation from the noir film genre, Stahelski added that "Noir maybe was sort of less impact for us than the other sort of westerns and Kurosawa and things like that. I think we wanted to make this hard-boiled character."

In January 2024, it was announced that Chad Stahelski, Basil Iwanyk, and Erica Lee will serve in oversight roles for the John Wick franchise. Stahelski's production studio 87Eleven will create a "comprehensive multiplatform content strategy...to guide the short- and long-term creative direction, franchise strategy and strategic growth...to ensure that quality, tone and vision remain consistent." This will be done in collaboration with Thunder Road Studios and Lionsgate.

== Additional crew and production details ==
| Title | Crew/Detail | | | | | |
| Title | Composer(s) | Cinematographer(s) | Editor(s) | Production companies | Distributing companies | Running time |
|---|---|---|---|---|---|---|
| John Wick: Chapter 1 | Tyler Bates & Joel J. Richard | Jonathan Sela | Elísabet Ronaldsdóttir | MJW Films, DefyNite Films, Summit Entertainment, 87Eleven Productions, Thunder Road Films | Lions Gate Films | 101 mins |
| John Wick: Chapter 2 | Tyler Bates & Joel J. Richard | Dan Laustsen | Evan Schiff | TIK Films, Lionsgate Films, Thunder Road Films, Summit Entertainment, 87Eleven Productions | Lions Gate Entertainment | 122 mins |
| John Wick: Chapter 3 – Parabellum | Tyler Bates & Joel J. Richard | Dan Laustsen | Evan Schiff | Lions Gate Films, Thunder Road Films, Summit Entertainment, 87Eleven Productions | Lions Gate Entertainment | 131 mins |
| John Wick: Chapter 4 | Tyler Bates & Joel J. Richard | Dan Laustsen | Nathan Orloff | Lions Gate Films, Thunder Road Films, Summit Entertainment, 87Eleven Entertainment | Lions Gate Entertainment | 169 mins |
| The Continental: From the World of John Wick | Raffertie | Peter Deming, and Pål Ulvik Rokseth | Ron Rosen, Steven Lang, and Armen Gasparian | Peacock Originals, Cool-ish Productions, Lionsgate Television, King of Brockton Inc, Thunder Road Pictures, Last Man Standing Films, Reese Wernick Productions | Peacock | 289 mins |
| From the World of John Wick: Ballerina | Tyler Bates & Joel J. Richard | Romain Lacourbas | Jason Ballantine | Lions Gate Films, Summit Entertainment, Thunder Road Pictures, 87Eleven Entertainment | Lions Gate Entertainment | 125 mins |
| Caine | TBA | Markus Förderer | TBA | Lions Gate Films, Summit Entertainment, Thunder Road Pictures, 87Eleven Entertainment | Lions Gate Entertainment | TBA |

== Reception ==
=== Box office performance ===
| Film | U.S. release date | Box office gross | | | Budget | Ref(s) |
| Film | U.S. release date | U.S. and Canada | Other territories | Worldwide | Budget | Ref(s) |
|---|---|---|---|---|---|---|
| John Wick: Chapter 1 | October 24, 2014 | $43,037,835 | $43,047,356 | $86,085,191 | $20–30 million | |
| John Wick: Chapter 2 | February 10, 2017 | $92,029,184 | $82,319,448 | $174,348,632 | $40 million | |
| John Wick: Chapter 3 – Parabellum | May 17, 2019 | $171,015,687 | $157,333,700 | $328,349,387 | $75 million | |
| John Wick: Chapter 4 | March 24, 2023 | $187,131,806 | $260,184,599 | $447,316,405 | $100 million | |
| Ballerina | June 6, 2025 | $58,051,327 | $82,149,909 | $140,201,236 | $90 million | |
| Total | | $551,265,839 | $625,035,012 | $1,176,300,851 | $325–335 million | |

=== Critical and public response ===
The films of the John Wick franchise have gained widespread critical acclaim, with many reviewers opining John Wick as one of the greatest movie franchises of all time. Rolling Stone called John Wick "the last great American movie franchise."

Critical and public response of John Wick films
| Film | Rotten Tomatoes | Metacritic | CinemaScore |
|---|---|---|---|
| John Wick: Chapter 1 | 86% (226 reviews) | 68 (39 reviews) | B |
| John Wick: Chapter 2 | 89% (283 reviews) | 75 (43 reviews) | A− |
| John Wick: Chapter 3 – Parabellum | 89% (358 reviews) | 73 (50 reviews) | A− |
| John Wick: Chapter 4 | 94% (385 reviews) | 78 (58 reviews) | A |
| Ballerina | 75% (306 reviews) | 59 (49 reviews) | A– |

Critical response of John Wick TV series
| Title | Season | Rotten Tomatoes | Metacritic |
|---|---|---|---|
| The Continental: From the World of John Wick | 1 | 65% (85 reviews) | 53 (27 reviews) |

== Other media ==
=== Video games ===
Wick appears as a playable character in Payday 2, voiced by Dave Fouquette, with Ian McShane and Lance Reddick reprising their respective roles as Winston and Charon in supporting roles. John Wick-themed elements were also added to Fortnite Battle Royale upon the launch of its ninth season, occurring a day before the third film's release. A Wick-inspired character had previously been available in the game's third season.

John Wick Chronicles, a virtual reality game set in the Continental Hotel, was released on February 9, 2017. Players assassinate multiple targets inside the hotel as John Wick using a multitude of weapons. Announced in March 2016 as John Wick: The Impossible Task (also known as John Wick: An Eye for an Eye and John Wick: The VR Experience), "one of the first major VR first-person shooters", the game released by Starbreeze Studios as a launch title of the HTC Vive, as a spin-off of Payday 2. Set in-between the first and second films, the game follows John Wick being hunted by a survivor of his "impossible task", featuring Ian McShane and Lance Reddick reprising their respective roles as Winston and Charon.

John Wick Hex, a tactical role-playing game, was announced in May 2019 and released on October 8, 2019. The game has the player control Wick in various missions to use his array of skills to take down opponents and features the voices of Ian McShane and Lance Reddick reprising their film roles, among others. The PlayStation 4 version of the game was released on May 5, 2020.

In November 2022, Lionsgate revealed that they had received several pitches for a AAA John Wick title, but were still currently fielding proposals.

In May 2024, Stern Pinball, Inc. (created in collaboration with Lionsgate) released 3 editions of John Wick pinball games: Pro, Premium and Limited Edition versions.

In June 2025, as part of a collaboration with the Call of Duty franchise to promote Ballerina, Eve Macarro was added as a purchasable playable character to Call of Duty: Black Ops 6, with Ana de Armas reprising her role. An in-game event themed after Ballerina was also released in the same month.

In February 2026, Saber Interactive and Lionsgate announced a new AAA John Wick video game for PlayStation 5, Xbox Series X and PC, featuring an original story and Keanu Reeves reprising his role.

=== Comic books ===
A John Wick comic book mini-series was released between November 29, 2017, and January 31, 2018, by Dynamite Entertainment. It was written by Greg Pak and illustrated by Giovanni Valletta (issues 1 and 2) and Matt Gaudio (issues 3–5). The five-book series chronicles a young John Wick after his release from prison and his first vendetta. It serves as a prequel to the movie franchise and introduces the Book of Rules, The Continental and other aspects familiar within the John Wick movie series.

=== The Simpsons ===
On May 23, 2021, the 32nd season finale of The Simpsons, titled "The Last Barfighter", aired on Fox as a parody of John Wick: Chapter 2 and John Wick: Chapter 3 – Parabellum, featuring Ian McShane guest starring as Artemis Scott, Winston's twin brother and the manager of "The Confidential" hotel, part of a secret society of bartenders of which members include Moe Szyslak and Dr. Julius Hibbert.

=== Documentary ===
Wick Is Pain, a documentary film about the franchise, was released at Beyond Fest on May 8, 2025, and then on digital platforms the next day. The documentary is directed by Jeffrey Doe.

== See also ==
- Lycoris Recoil – A Japanese anime series and media franchise that follows a similar premise
