= Day Shift (film) =

2022 film by J. J. Perry

- Official release poster
- Directed by: J. J. Perry
- Screenplay by: Tyler Tice; Shay Hatten
- Story by: Tyler Tice
- Produced by: Shaun Redick; Yvette Yates Redick; Chad Stahelski; Jason Spitz; Peter Baxter
- Starring: Jamie Foxx; Dave Franco; Natasha Liu Bordizzo; Meagan Good; Karla Souza; Zion Broadnax; Steve Howey; Scott Adkins; Snoop Dogg
- Cinematography: Toby Oliver
- Edited by: Paul Harb
- Music by: Tyler Bates
- Production companies: 87Eleven Entertainment; Impossible Dream Entertainment
- Distributed by: Netflix
- Release date: August 12, 2022
- Running time: 114 minutes
- Country: United States
- Language: English
- Budget: $50-100 million

Day Shift is a 2022 American vampire action comedy film directed by J. J. Perry in his directorial debut, written by Tyler Tice and Shay Hatten from a story by Tice, and starring Jamie Foxx as a blue-collar father whose pool-cleaning job is a front for his work as a vampire hunter. The film also stars Dave Franco, Snoop Dogg, Natasha Liu Bordizzo, Meagan Good, Karla Souza, Steve Howey, Scott Adkins and Zion Broadnax.

Netflix released Day Shift on its streaming service on August 12, 2022. The film received mixed reviews from critics.

== Plot ==
Bud Jablonski is a blue-collar father who provides for his family by hunting and killing vampires under the guise of being a pool cleaner.

Bud sees a man leaving the house containing his target. He silently breaks into the house, and encounters two vampires, an elderly woman and a younger man, whom he kills after a lengthy fight. Bud pulls out their fangs and tries to cash them in at a pawn shop, but scoffs at the offer of the owner Troy. To settle his money problems, he reluctantly considers returning to the vampire hunting union.

Bud enlists his old army friend, "Big" John Elliot, to help him rejoin the union. Due to Bud's history of code violations, union boss Ralph Seeger reluctantly allows him a trial period under two conditions: he works the day shift (which pays worse) and must be supervised by the union rep Seth, who is tasked to report any code violations.

Meanwhile, the corpses of the two vampires are found by the wealthy vampire Audrey. After an investigation, she ascertains that Bud is the one responsible. Before killing the witness Troy, Audrey muses that humans used to worship vampires as gods. She reveals her plan to restore the old order by establishing vampire colonies and create an army.

Bud and Seth go hunting, and despite Bud's several union protocol violations, Seth does not report them after learning of Bud's financial situation and need to support his family. After they find and destroy an unusual nest filled with several varieties of vampires, Audrey contacts Bud and threatens his family, revealing that the elderly vampire was her daughter. Bud rushes to his ex-wife to save her, while being pursued by vampires. However, she and his daughter are taken hostage by Audrey, and Seth is turned into a vampire. Bud and Seth recruit Bud's neighbor, an outcast vampire named Heather, to help them assault Audrey's stronghold.

At the stronghold, they are joined by Big John. During the fight, John gets bitten and chooses to sacrifice himself using an explosion to kill the guard vampires. Bud is physically overwhelmed by Audrey, but through a clever trick, he gains the upper hand, and kills her.

When Seeger arrives with the union and tries to kick Bud out, Seth uses his extensive knowledge of loopholes in the union's rules to prevent him from doing so. As the Jablonskis drive away, Big John climbs out of a manhole in the street, having survived the explosion.

== Cast ==
- Jamie Foxx as Bud Jablonski, a former paratrooper and down-on-his-luck vampire hunter who later becomes Seth's best friend.
- Dave Franco as Seth, Bud's union supervisor and partner.
- Natasha Liu Bordizzo as Heather, Bud's neighbor and a nursing student, who was turned into a vampire by Audrey to trap Bud's family.
- Meagan Good as Jocelyn Jablonski, Bud's ex-wife.
- Karla Souza as Audrey San Fernando, a vampire posing as a real estate agent threatening to kill Bud's family as revenge for her daughter.
- Steve Howey as Mike Nazarian, vampire hunter and Diran's brother.
- Scott Adkins as Diran Nazarian, vampire hunter and Mike's brother.
- Oliver Masucci as Klaus, Audrey's right-hand man.
- Snoop Dogg as John "Big John" Elliott, an old friend of Bud's and a veteran vampire hunter
- Eric Lange as Ralph Seeger, president of the vampire hunter's union.
- Peter Stormare as Troy, a pawnbroker who illegally deals in supernatural items.
- Zion Broadnax as Paige Jablonski, Bud and Jocelyn's daughter.

== Production ==
The film was financed by Netflix, 87Eleven Entertainment and Impossible Dream Entertainment, with a budget of between $50 million and $100 million. Day Shift is the directorial debut of longtime (starting 2006) second-unit director J. J. Perry. Tyler Tice wrote the script, and Shay Hatten provided a rewrite. Chad Stahelski, Jason Spitz, Jamie Foxx, Shaun Redick Yvette Yates Redick, Datari Turner, and Peter Baxter produced. Netflix announced the film on October 20, 2020, by revealing Foxx had joined the cast. Additional cast members were announced in April 2021. Principal photography was originally scheduled to take place in Los Angeles, California between April 19 and August 22, 2021 but relocated to Georgia in order to take advantage of film incentives.

Tyler Bates composed the film score. Netflix Music released the soundtrack as a Spotify playlist.

== Release ==
Day Shift was released on Netflix on August 12, 2022.

== Reception ==
On the review aggregator website Rotten Tomatoes, 57% of 138 critics' reviews are positive, with an average rating of 5.7/10. The website's consensus reads: "Game stars and an appealingly goofy premise aren't enough to make up for Day Shift's uninspired action-comedy hijinks." Metacritic, which uses a weighted average, assigned the film a score of 51 out of 100, based on 33 critics, indicating "mixed or average" reviews.

Michael Ordoña of the Los Angeles Times called the film a "damned delight" and said: "One would be tempted to call it the best horror comedy of 2022 so far, but it mixes so many genres it's more like 2022's best horror-buddy-cop-cartel-drama-bounty-hunter-martial-arts-action comedy (so far)." Lovia Gyarkye of The Hollywood Reporter called it "a rambunctious, strange and occasionally humorous action-thriller-comedy".

Owen Gleiberman of Variety found the film agreeable at first but "until it starts to be just convoluted enough to give you a headache, especially when the rules are applied as inconsistently as they are here". Peter Travers of ABC News wrote: "A slumming Jamie Foxx is cool to the max as a vampire hunter gunning down bloodsuckers in sunny LA. But you leave this goofy but mostly godawful action-comedy feeling pummeled, beaten down by an avalanche of sound and fury signifying the usual nothing." Brian Lowry of CNN wrote: "It's the kind of star-driven vehicle that yields obvious benefits to Netflix even if, qualitatively speaking, it doesn't deserve to see the light of day."
