= Chad Stahelski's unrealized projects =

During his long career, American filmmaker Chad Stahelski has worked on several projects which never progressed beyond the pre-production stage under his direction. Some of these projects fell in development hell, were officially canceled, were in development limbo or would see life under a different production team.

== 2010s ==
=== Rain TV series ===
On August 18, 2014, Stahelski was set to executive produce Rain, the television series adaptation of Barry Eisler's John Rain action thriller book series, with Eisler, David Leitch, and Keanu Reeves executive producing with Slingshot Global Media, and Reeves set to lead the series.

=== Cowboy Ninja Viking ===
On January 29, 2015, Stahelski and David Leitch were set to co-direct the feature film adaptation of A.J. Lieberman and Riley Rossmo's graphic novel Cowboy Ninja Viking with Chris Pratt set to lead the film, Paul Wernick and Rhett Reese co-writing the screenplay and producing with Mark Gordon, Guymon Casady and Ben Forkner, and Universal Pictures distributing the film. But on January 31, 2018, the duo were ultimately replaced by Michelle MacLaren as the director.

=== Medieval ===
On February 20, 2015, Stahelski and David Leitch were set to co-direct the action film Medieval, with Michael Finch and Alex Litvak writing the script and Neal H. Moritz producing the film for Columbia Pictures, after Rob Cohen's attempt to make the movie failed at 20th Century Fox & New Regency.

=== Bloodshot ===
On April 21, 2015, Stahelski was set to co-direct with David Leitch the superhero film Bloodshot with Jeff Wadlow and Eric Heisserer writing the script and Neal H. Moritz, Valiant Comics COO Dinesh Shamdasani and DMG Media producing the film for Columbia Pictures. But on March 5, 2017, David S. F. Wilson was hired to direct the movie.

=== Kill or Be Killed ===
On December 14, 2017, Stahelski was attached to direct the feature film adaptation of Ed Brubaker and Sean Phillips' Kill or Be Killed comic book with Daniel Casey writing the screenplay, Basil Iwanyk, Erica Lee, Jeff Waxman and Brubaker were producing through Thunder Road Pictures.

=== Sandman Slim ===
On February 12, 2018, Stahelski was attached to direct the feature film adaptation of Richard Kadrey Sandman Slim book series with Kerry Williamson writing the screenplay, Patrick Walmsley, Julie Yorn and John Lesher were producing through LBI Entertainment and Studio 8.

=== Analog ===
On May 22, 2018, Stahelski was set to direct and produce the feature film adaptation of Gerry Duggan and David O'Sullivan's dystopian sci-fi comic book Analog with Ryan Condal writing the screenplay, David Leitch producing and Lionsgate Films distributing.

== 2020s ==
=== Untitled car movie ===
On March 3, 2020, Stahelski was planned to direct and produce a car movie with Andre Nemec and Josh Appelbaum attached to write the screenplay, Andrew Form & Brad Fuller were set to produce and Paramount Pictures distributing the film.

=== American The Man from Nowhere remake ===
On August 5, 2020, Stahelski was set to produce the American film adaptation of Lee Jeong-beom's crime film The Man from Nowhere, with Derek Kolstad writing the screenplay, Jason Spitz and Alex Young producing through 87Eleven in collaboration with CJ E&M and New Line Cinema handling distribution.

=== Arcana ===
On August 25, 2020, Stahelski was set to direct Michael Finch & Alex Litvak's urban fantasy screenplay Arcana with Stahelski, Jason Spitz, & Alex Young producing through 87Eleven with Finch & Litvak, and Lionsgate Films distributing.

=== Lush ===
On December 9, 2020, Stahelski was set to produce the feature film adaptation of Duane Swierczynski's comedic spy thriller short story Lush with Swierczynski writing the screenplay, Jason Spitz & Alex Young producing through 87Eleven in collaboration with Chris Goldberg's Winterlight Pictures and Lionsgate Films distributing.

=== Classified ===
On March 10, 2021, Stahelski was set to direct Andrew Deutschman and Jason Pagan's action thriller pitch Classified with Stahelski, Alex Young and Jason Spitz are producing through 87Eleven Entertainment, and Underground's Trevor Engelson and New Line Cinema distributing.

=== Ghost of Tsushima ===
On March 25, 2021, Stahelski was set to direct the feature film adaptation of the Ghost of Tsushima video game with Stahelski, Alex Young and Jason Spitz are producing through 87Eleven Entertainment, Asad Qizilbash and Carter Swan will produce through PlayStation Productions, Sucker Punch Productions and Columbia Pictures distributing, and on April 12, 2022, Takashi Doscher was hired to write the screenplay.

=== Shibumi ===
On August 4, 2021, Stahelski was set to direct the feature film adaptation of Trevanian's thriller novel Shibumi with Stahelski, Alex Young and Jason Spitz are producing through 87Eleven Entertainment and Warner Bros. Pictures distributing the film, and on August 18, 2022, Matthew Orton was hired to write the screenplay.

=== Project Nemesis TV series ===
On May 6, 2022, Stahelski was set to executive produce and direct Project Nemesis, the television series adaptation of Jeremy Robinson's Nemesis Saga book series in collaboration with Neal H. Moritz's Original Film & Sony Pictures Television.

=== Black Samurai ===
On October 20, 2022, Stahelski was set to direct the feature film adaptation of Marc Olden's Black Samurai book series with Leigh Dana Jackson writing the screenplay, Stahelski, Alex Young and Jason Spitz are producing through 87Eleven Entertainment, John Schoenfelder and Russell Ackerman will produce through Addictive Pictures, Diane Crafford, Liza Fleissig and Andre Gaines of Cinemation Studios and Netflix distributing.

=== Rainbow Six ===
On January 17, 2023, Stahelski was set to direct the feature film adaptation of Tom Clancy's Rainbow Six novel with Michael B. Jordan reprising his Without Remorse character John Clark and executive producing with Elizabeth Raparo through Outlier Society, Stahelski, Alex Young and Jason Spitz through 87Eleven Entertainment, Akiva Goldsman & Greg Lessans through Weed Road Pictures, plus Josh Appelbaum & Andre Nemec through The Saw Mill and Paramount Pictures distributing the film's theatrical release, and in February that same year, Daniel Fajemisin-Duncan and Marlon Smith was hired to write the screenplay.

=== Vice City TV series ===
On March 9, 2023, Stahelski was set to executive produce and direct Darnell Metayer and Josh Peters series Vice City for Paramount+ in collaboration with 50 Cent's G-Unit, Lionsgate Television, & Paramount Television Studios.

=== Untitled Star Wars movie trilogy ===
In January 2024, Stahelski revealed that he has story ideas for a Star Wars trilogy.

=== Joe Ledger TV series ===
On August 29, 2024, Stahelski was set to executive produce the television series adaptation of Jonathan Maberry's Joe Ledger book series through 87eleven Entertainment.
