= Thriller (2018 film) =

- Theatrical release poster
- Directed by: Dallas Jackson
- Screenplay by: Dallas Jackson; Ken Rance
- Produced by: Adam Hendricks; John H. Lang; Greg Gilreath; Dallas Jackson
- Starring: Jessica Allain; Tequan Richmond; Chelsea Rendon; Mitchell Edwards; Pepi Sonuga; Maestro Harrell; RZA; Mykelti Williamson
- Cinematography: Mac Fisken
- Edited by: John Quinn
- Music by: RZA
- Production companies: Blumhouse Productions; Meridian Entertainment; Divide/Conquer; Symbolic Exchange; DJ Classicz
- Distributed by: Netflix
- Release dates: September 23, 2018 (LA Film Festival); April 14, 2019
- Running time: 87 minutes
- Country: United States
- Language: English

Thriller is a 2018 American slasher film directed by Dallas Jackson in his directorial debut. The film was written by Jackson and Ken Rance. It stars Jessica Allain, Tequan Richmond, Chelsea Rendon, Mitchell Edwards, Pepi Sonuga, Maestro Harrell, RZA and Mykelti Williamson. The film is a co-production between Divide/Conquer and Blumhouse Productions.

The film premiered at the LA Film Festival on September 23, 2018, and was released by Netflix on April 14, 2019.

== Plot ==
Years after a child was framed for a murder he didn't commit, and after ten years of being in prison, he plots and executes revenge on a group of friends he feels were responsible of doing him wrong

== Cast ==
- Jessica Allain as Lisa Walker
- Luke Tennie as Derrick Jackson
- Tequan Richmond as Andre Dixon
- Paige Hurd as Gina Brown
- Mykelti Williamson as Detective Raymond Johnson
- RZA as Principal Hurd
- Jason Woods as Chauncey Page
- Michael Ocampo as Eddie Gomez
- Vanessa Bell Calloway as Mrs. Jackson
- Maestro Harrell as Ronnie DeBerry
- Big Boy as himself
- Pepi Sonuga as Kim Morris
- Vanessa A. Williams as Mrs. Walker
- Chelsea Rendon as Tiffany Rodriguez
- Valery Ortiz as Ms. Cruz
- The Lady of Rage as Emma Page
- Mitchell Edwards as Ty Reynolds

== Production ==
Principal photography on the film began in June 2017. Post production for the film was completed in May 2018.

== Reception ==
On the review aggregator website Rotten Tomatoes, 40% of 25 critics' reviews are positive, with an average rating of 4.5/10. The website's consensus reads: "Thriller has an appealing cast and a fresh perspective on its genre, but those elements aren't enough to outweigh a bland and predictable story." Metacritic, which uses a weighted average, assigned the film a score of 28 out of 100, based on 6 critics, indicating "generally unfavorable" reviews.

== See also ==
- List of black films of the 2010s
