= Johnny Keep Walking! =

- Theatrical release poster
- Chinese: 年会不能停！
- Literal meaning: The Annual Gala Must Go On!
- Hanyu Pinyin: Niánhuì bùnéng tíng!
- Directed by: Dong Runnian
- Written by: Dong Runnian; Ying Luojia
- Produced by: Ying Luojia
- Starring: Dong Chengpeng; Bai Ke; Sabrina Zhuang
- Cinematography: Xie Zhengyu
- Edited by: Huangzeng Hongchen; Yibo Zhang
- Music by: Yixin Huang
- Distributed by: Beijing Jiaying Chuntian Film; China Youth New Film Culture Media (Hainan); China Film Distribution; Tianjin Maoyan Microfilm Culture Media; Xiaoxiang Film Group; Shanghai Youzhi Culture Communication; China Film
- Release date: 29 December 2023
- Running time: 117 minutes
- Country: China
- Language: Mandarin
- Box office: US$178.4 million

Johnny Keep Walking! (Chinese: 年会不能停!; pinyin: Niánhuì bùnéng tíng; lit. 'The Annual Gala Must Go On!') is a 2023 Chinese comedy film directed by Dong Runnian and starring Dong Chengpeng (Da Peng). The film tells the story of Hu Jianlin, a factory employee who is mistakenly promoted to the human resources department in the company headquarters.

Johnny Keep Walking! was released on 29 December 2023 in China. It grossed over $178 million, becoming the tenth-highest-grossing Chinese film of 2023 and the third-highest-grossing New Year's Day release in Chinese film history.

== Plot ==
Hu Jianlin is an honest and hardworking fitter with years of service at Zhonghe Standard Component Factory, who loves to perform in the company's talent show. One day, he unexpectedly receives a transfer order assigning him to Zhonghe Group's head office. Believing it to be a recognition of his dedication and years of service, having been named an exemplary worker year after year, Hu accepts the transfer. Unbeknownst to him, the promotion was a drunken mistake after a raucous party.

Ma Jie "Magic", assistant head of Staff Affairs and Company Culture, is tasked by his boss Zhao Feiyu "Thomas" to handle the mix-up. Fearful that acknowledging the mistake could cost him his position, Ma Jie continues to cover for Hu and attempts to "make the best of a bad situation". Zhuang Zhengzhi, head of Distribution, is furious with the mix-up, having paid a bribe of 300,000 yuan via middleman Hou Chengshi to secure a transfer, Hu's accidental promotion threatens to expose the scheme.

Hu, mistaken for Zhuang, is renamed John "Johnny" by HR to fit corporate norms of internationalised names. He blunders through corporate life, his manufacturing background and unfamiliarity with corporate culture quickly attracting attention within the company. Employees across all levels speculate about his identity and connections. Ironically, the confusion leads to Johnny being rapidly promoted again and again, as others assume he is a powerful insider or part of some top-level strategy. Pan Yiran "Penny", a cynical temp in the admin department and also known as Penny befriends Johnny, having been stuck on a temporary contract with a promise of full-time status for years but is wary of Johnny's sudden rise.

Meanwhile, the company is facing a crisis, with major layoffs looming and the elaborate annual gala being prepared to project stability and success. As layoffs approach, tensions escalate: temporary staff fear for their livelihoods while execs drop hints of cost-cutting disguised as strategic restructuring and entire floors are laid off. Unbeknownst to Johnny, he unwittingly signs off on the shutdown of his former Standard Component Factory, firing his friends and colleagues as part of the layoffs.

Arriving to the gala, Hu hijacks the event and reveals scandals through a musical performance which reveals many employees, such as Ma Jie, being stuck at the same level without raise or promotion whilst bosses party, temporary staff such as Penny being kept permanently without the benefits of permanent contracts, that Zhuang paid for the 300,000 yuan bribe through mixing parts manufactured by Standard Component Factory with cheaper, lower-quality parts and taking the difference in price, as well as a culture of laying people off whenever the company went through difficulties whilst spending millions on the gala. The company president commits to investigate the issues, that justice shall be done, and commits to rehiring everyone that should not have lost their jobs.

In the final sequence, Ma Jie is shown to have been promoted, those involved in the conspiracy are arrested, Johnny is promoted, the Standard Component Factory is renovated, Pan Yiran is given a full-time contract to which she resigns from the company.

== Cast ==
- Dong Chengpeng as Hu Jianlin "Johnny Hu", a factory fitter
- Bai Ke as Ma Jie "Magic", the company's human resources manager
- Sabrina Zhuang as Pan Yiran "Penny Pan", a group employee
- Wang Xun as Zhuang Zhengzhi, a factory employee
- Sun Yizhou as Peter
- Li Naiwen as Xu Yunfeng "Jeffrey", the group's general manager
- Ouyang Fenqiang as Chairman Hu
- Tong Mo Nan as Mark
- Da Mu as Thomas
- Huang Huang as Tony
- Yi Yunhe as Xu Yongsen
- Yang Lei as Lao Hou
- Lan Xiya as He Xuan

== Original soundtrack ==
- Promotional song
  - Title: "Working hard"
  - Singers: Dapeng, Baike, Sabrina Zhuang, Sun Yizhou
  - Lyrics: Lin Junmin
  - Composer: Lin Junmin
  - Title: "Pi Te Pi"
  - Singers: Spylent
  - Lyrics: Spylent
  - Composer: Spylent
- Theme song
  - Title: "My future is not a dream + Song of the workers"
  - Singers: Dapeng, Baike, Sabrina Zhuang
  - Lyrics: Chen Jiali, Weng Xiaoliang, Tang Yidan
  - Composer: Chen Jiali, Weng Xiaoliang, Guo Douzhi *Interlude
  - Title: "Xiangjiang Middle Road"
  - Singer: Sabrina Zhuang
  - Lyricist: Sabrina Zhuang
  - Composition: Sabrina Zhuang

== Release ==
- China: 29 December 2023
- United States, Australia: 18 January 2024
- United Kingdom, Canada: 19 January 2024
- New Zealand, Singapore, Malaysia, Hong Kong, Macau: 25 January 2024
- Germany: 1 February 2024
- Cambodia: 15 February 2024

== Reception ==
=== Box office ===
Within mainland China, Johnny Keep Walking! earned 1.292 billion yuan, making it the number 1 for the New Year's Day box office. The film was number 1 in the Chinese box office for weeks 1–4 of 2024.

=== Critical response ===
Johnny Keep Walking! was described by Sino-Cinema as "a pointed satire on corporate bureaucracy and office politics", with praise directed towards its ensemble cast, particularly Dapeng and Bai Ke, although some criticism was given for the pacing in the second half of the film, spending too long on the subplot of the passed-over executive getting his revenge, diverting attention away from Hu Jianlin's character, as well as the finale being too drawn-out. Additional criticism was given towards the contrast between the tone in the first half being abandoned for a more conventional corruption drama.

The Straits Times described the film as a "heartfelt office satire", commenting that its box office success in China was likely a result of "striking a chord with the country’s current generation of aggrieved white-collar professionals".

== Sequel ==
A spin-off sequel, Make Zhonghe Great Again, was released in 2026.

== Awards ==
Year	Ceremony	Awards	Nominees	Result	Ref
2024	China Film Directors Association Awards from 2020 to 2023	Screenwriter of the Year (2023)	Dong Runnian, Ying Luojia	Nominated	
2024	The 37th Hundred Flowers Awards	Hundred Flowers Awards for Best Screenplay	Dong Runnian, Ying Luojia	Won	
2024	The 37th Hundred Flowers Awards	Hundred Flowers Award for Best Director	Dong Runnian	Nominated	
2024	37th Golden Rooster Awards	Golden Rooster Award for Best Picture	Johnny Keep Walking!	Nominated	
2024	37th Golden Rooster Awards	Golden Rooster Award for Best Supporting Actor	Bai Ke	Nominated	
2024	37th Golden Rooster Awards	Golden Rooster Award for Best Writing	Dong Runnian/Ying Luojia	Nominated	
2024	37th Golden Rooster Awards	Golden Rooster Award for Best Editing	Huangzeng Hongzhan	Nominated	
2025	The 20th Huabiao Awards	Outstanding feature film	Johnny Keep Walking!	Won	
2025	The 20th Huabiao Awards	Huabiao Award for Outstanding Writer	Dong Runnian, Ying Luojia	Won	
