= The Lychee Road =

2025 Chinese historical comedy film

- Theatrical release poster
- Simplified Chinese: 长安的荔枝
- Traditional Chinese: 長安的荔枝
- Hanyu Pinyin: Cháng'ān dě Lìzhī
- Directed by: Da Peng
- Written by: Shen Yuyue; Dai Si'ao; Da Peng
- Based on: Lychees of Chang'an by Ma Boyong
- Produced by: Li Yaping; Zhang Bo
- Starring: Da Peng; Bai Ke; Zhuang Dafei; Terrance Lau
- Cinematography: Wang Boxue
- Edited by: Tu Yiran; Huangzeng Hongchen
- Music by: Zhai Jinyan
- Production companies: Shanghai Aimmedia Pictures; Tianjin Maoyan Weiying Culture Media; Beijing Yuanqi Entertainment Culture; Shanghai Ruyi Film and Television Production; Wanda Pictures; Shanghai Tacheng Film; Dongyang Xingyong Film and Television Culture
- Distributed by: Aimmedia Pictures
- Release date: July 18, 2025 (China)
- Running time: 122 minutes
- Country: China
- Language: Mandarin
- Box office: US$83.6 million

The Lychee Road (Chinese: 长安的荔枝) is a 2025 Chinese historical comedy film co-written, directed by and starring Da Peng. The film is adapted from Ma Boyong's 2021 novel Lychees of Chang'an, inspired by Yang Guifei's famous fondness for lychees. The story follows a lowly official, Li Shande, who is tasked with transporting fresh lychees from Lingnan to Chang'an, some 5,000 li (2,500 km) away, for the birthday of Yang Guifei. The film premiered in China on 18 July 2025.

== Plot ==
Set during the Tianbao era of the Tang dynasty, the film follows Li Shande, a low-ranking inspector who has spent 18 years toiling at the Bureau of Imperial Gardens in Chang’an, capital of the Tang Empire. One day, he is assigned what appears to be a moderately lucrative task: delivering lychees from Lingnan to Chang’an for the birthday of Yang Guifei, Emperor Xuanzong's favored consort. Initially viewing the assignment as an opportunity to help pay off his house mortgage, Li soon discovers that the word “preserved” on the edict has been surreptitiously pasted over the original word: “fresh.” Realizing that he has been made a scapegoat by his superior, Li attempts to refuse but is forced to accept the impossible mission. With the encouragement of his friend and fellow countryman Du Shaoling (who would immortalize Yang Guifei's fondness for lychees in his poem), Li bid farewell to his wife and daughter, setting out for Lingnan, some 5,000 li (2,500 km) away.

After a month-long journey, Li arrives in Lingnan and seeks assistance from He Qiguang, the governor. Li is initially beaten and dismissed as an impostor due to the impossible mission, but after his identity is verified, Li is given a travel pass and a nearly mute slave as nominal assistance. Li’s Chang’an identity nevertheless attracts Su Liang, a merchant who hopes to exploit the travel pass for his business and build connections in the capital. With the help of a local lychee farmgirl, Ah Tong, they experiment with various methods to transplant and preserve lychees. Despite repeated refinements to the plan, Li comes to realize that their efforts alone are insufficient and that only large-scale government mobilization can accomplish the mission.

Li returns to Chang’an to seek administrative support, but is instead passed from office to office without result. Matters reach a low point when the palace eunuch Yu Chao’en attempts to appropriate Li’s plan for his own credit and has him imprisoned. Unexpectedly, Li is rescued by the Right Chancellor Yang Guozhong, Yang Guifei's cousin and Yu’s political rival, who views the lychee mission as a pawn in his power game.

Granted a golden token by the chancellor, who also takes Li’s family hostage to ensure compliance, Li swiftly mobilizes government resources and establishes an empire-wide relay system, but also witnesses the suffering and exploitation imposed on common people in the name of the court. Officials now curry favor with Li as the chancellor’s envoy, but Su is disappointed when Li fails to secure the chancellor’s approval for his involvement in the mission, even though Su merely offers to fund the transport at his own expense.

The initial stages of the relay succeed, but midway through the journey the team discovers that relay stations and surrounding villages have been abandoned. With no alternative, Li and a small group of loyal companions press on on foot, while the ex-slave is sent to seek help. As horses collapse and supplies dwindle, the ex-slave reappears at a critical moment with Su, who rescues the mission by transporting the lychees by boat.

As the group nears Chang’an, Yu dispatches assassins to sabotage the delivery and prevent the chancellor from claiming credit. Traps and firebombs destroy most of the convoy. During a cliffside fight, the ex-slave—whom Li had promised to free upon reaching Chang’an, where the enslavement of free citizens was prohibited—sacrifices himself to save Li. Carrying a single remaining jar of lychees, Li narrowly escapes and rides through the palace gates just in time for Yang Guifei’s birthday celebration, while his wife watches him gallop past, kapok flowers from Lingnan, her requested gift, spilling from his bag.

At the banquet, the emperor tells Yang Guifei that Yang Guozhong has presented lychees from Lingnan. As she is about to taste one, she is distracted by a dance performance offered by An Lushan’s son, and the lychees apparently remain untouched amid the cornucopia of fruits and delicacies before her.

Afterwards, Li is granted an audience with the chancellor, who remarks that the emperor requested lychees from Lingnan after hearing they were superior to those from Sichuan, suggesting that Yang Guifei herself may neither have known nor cared about them. Li instead confronts the chancellor over the human cost and corruption surrounding the lychee transport, including the excessive taxation imposed not only to sustain the relay system but also to enrich officials at every level, the chancellor included. These levies forced some impoverished villages and the relay stations they maintained to be abandoned, and also explain Yang’s personal motive for barring Su from funding the transport. Enraged, the chancellor strikes Li and is about to deliver a fatal blow to silence him when Yu suddenly arrives, announcing that the emperor has awarded Li a basket of green plums in recognition of the mission’s completion. Nevertheless, having offended the chancellor, Li and his family are exiled to Lingnan.

One year later, living in exile and working with Ah Tong on her lychee farm, Li learns from Su's brother that Su has made a fortune through trade in Persia. Li also hears that Chang’an has fallen during the An Lushan Rebellion. Sitting alone in the fields, Li breaks down, lamenting the years he spent striving for a life in the capital. He compulsively eats lychees until his wife and daughter join him. Having stopped crying, Li tells them that he is fine—he has just eaten too many lychees.

== Cast ==
- Da Peng as Li Shande
- Bai Ke as Su Liang
- Zhuang Dafei as Ah Tong
- Terrance Lau as Lin Yinu
- Andy Lau as Yang Guozhong
- Yang Mi as Zheng Yuting
- Chang Yuan as Yu Chao'en
- Wei Xiang as Su Yuan
- Wang Xun as Liu Shuling
- Sun Yang as Zhao Xinmin
- Lam Suet as He Qiguang
- Song Xiaobao as Song Tiangang
- Fu Hang as Xiao Bai
- Zhang Ruoyun as Du Fu
- Jia Zhangke as an official
- Fan Deng as an official
- Ma Boyong as an official

== Production ==
Shooting began on 3 November 2024 and took place in various locations including Xiangyang, Yangjiang, Dongguan, Luoding, and Jiangmen.

== Release ==
The Lychee Road was initially released fully in China on the 18th of July, 2025. Later, it was released in Australia on the 24th of July, the United States limitedly on 25 July, Singapore on 31 July, and Hong Kong on the 7th of August 2025. It is rated M (mature) in Australia due to mature themes and violence.

== Reception ==
After being released, "China’s box office surged over the July 18–20 weekend" and dominated the leaderboard. Some people critique the movie as being able to resonate with modern youth in the workplace as it blended "historical legend with modern workplace satire and relatable personal struggles."

Ma Boyong, the original author of the novel Lychees of Chang'an, attended the premiere and praised the film as "more layered and emotionally resonant" than his novel.

== Accolades ==
Year	Award	Category	Recipient(s)	Results	Ref.
2025	38th Golden Rooster Awards	Best Picture	The Lychee Road	Nominated	
2025	38th Golden Rooster Awards	Best Director	Da Peng	Nominated	
2025	38th Golden Rooster Awards	Best Actor	Da Peng	Nominated	
2025	38th Golden Rooster Awards	Best Cinematography	Wang Boxue	Nominated	
2025	38th Golden Rooster Awards	Best Art Direction	Wang Jing	Nominated	
2025	38th Golden Rooster Awards	Best Music	Zhai Jinyan	Won	
