= Karoshi (film) =

Upcoming film by Takashi Doscher

Karōshi
- Teaser poster
- Directed by: Takashi Doscher
- Written by: Takashi Doscher
- Produced by: Chad Stahelski; Jason Spitz; Alex Young; Nathan Kahane
- Starring: Teo Yoo; Isabel May; Takehiro Hira; Bill Camp; Show Kasamatsu; Giancarlo Esposito; Cynthia Erivo
- Cinematography: Pawel Pogorzelski
- Edited by: Pete Beaudreau
- Production companies: 87Eleven Productions; True North
- Distributed by: Lionsgate
- Release date: February 5, 2027
- Running time: 89 minutes
- Country: United States
- Language: English

Karōshi is an upcoming American dystopian science fiction action film written and directed by Takashi Doscher. It stars Teo Yoo, Isabel May, Takehiro Hira, Bill Camp, Show Kasamatsu, Giancarlo Esposito, and Cynthia Erivo.

Karōshi is scheduled to be released in the United States by Lionsgate on February 5, 2027.

== Plot ==
In a near-future Manhattan, following a death at a powerful tech company, a mysterious man infiltrates the corporate headquarters to expose the dark violent system hidden within its walls.

== Cast ==
- Teo Yoo
- Isabel May
- Takehiro Hira
- Bill Camp
- Show Kasamatsu
- Giancarlo Esposito
- Cynthia Erivo
- Richard Harmon

== Production ==
In August 2024, Takashi Doscher was writing and directing an action thriller film titled Karōshi, with 87Eleven Productions, and Teo Yoo cast in the lead role. In November 2024, Isabel May joined the cast. In March 2025, Cynthia Erivo joined the cast. In April, Takehiro Hira joined the cast as the antagonist. In May, Giancarlo Esposito joined the cast. In July 2025, Bill Camp joined the cast.

Principal photography began in June 2025 and wrapped in on August 6, 2025, in Vancouver, Canada.

== Release ==
Karōshi is scheduled to be released in the United States by Lionsgate on February 5, 2027. It was originally scheduled to be released on January 29, 2027.
