= Sabrina Zhuang =

Macanese actress (born 2001)

- 庄达菲
- Born: Zhuang Dafei; 28 February 2001 (age 25); Shenyang, Liaoning Province, China
- Citizenship: China (Macau)
- Education: Beijing Film Academy (BA)
- Occupation: Actress
- Years active: 2018–present

Zhuang Dafei (Chinese: 庄达菲; born 28 February 2001), also known as Sabrina Zhuang, is a Macanese actress. She made her acting debut at the age of 10 in the film Old Man's Wish (2012) and began acting professionally in 2018 after signing with Jiaxing Media. She won Best Newcomer Actress in the 1st Global OTT Awards with the Youku series Mountains and Ocean (2019), and gained recognition for her roles in the web series Eternal Love of Dream and Closer to You (both 2020). She then starred in the films Johnny Keep Walking! (2023), Be My Friend (2024), and The Lychee Road (2025), and portrayed Huang Rong in Tsui Hark's Legends of the Condor Heroes: The Gallants (2025). She is set to appear in the upcoming Hollywood film Caine.

== Early life and education ==
Zhuang was born on 28 February 2001 in Shenyang, Liaoning Province, China, into a wealthy family. Her father is a Macanese businessman, and she holds the right of abode in Macau. She was raised in Beijing, and began appearing in magazine commercials since she was five years old. During her childhood, she was a member of a children's choir and received training in piano, violin, and cello. She attended Peking University Elementary School, and spent her fifth year of primary school on an exchange programme in Canada. At the age of 10, Zhuang was cast alongside Wu Tianming in the 2012 film Old Man's Wish, marking her acting debut. The experience sparked her interest in acting and her parents enrolled her in acting classes.

Zhuang attended the international education programme at Tsinghua University High School. At the age of 16, she appeared alongside TFBoys in a commercial for Mengniu Dairy and featured in a promotional video for the variety programme Super Girls. In June 2016, she released her debut solo single "Energy Station". While in high school, Zhuang decided to pursue acting at university, which led to disagreements with her mother, who preferred that she study finance. She was eventually admitted to the Beijing Film Academy ranking 11th nationwide in the entrance examination, majoring in performing arts.

== Career ==
Zhuang signed with Jiaxing Media in 2018. She appeared in the film Miss Puff as the younger version of Zhang Xinyi's character and in the television series Never Gone as the younger version of Wen Xin. In 2019, she starred in the Youku series Mountains And Ocean as archaeology student Xia Ruining, for which she won Best Newcomer Actress in the 1st Global OTT Awards. In 2020, she gained wider recognition for her breakout role as Jie Lu, a noblewoman who secretly admires the King Father of the East (played by Gao Weiguang), in the Tencent Video series Eternal Love of Dream. She then starred alongside Li Yinan in the Youku series Closer to You as Han Fei, the high school sweetheart of surgeon Wu Jinghao (played by Li), who travels back in time to save her from a car accident. In the same year, she also played the rebellious high school student Li Jinbu in I Don't Want To Be Friends With You and the psychiatrist Luo Kaihuai in Love Script. In 2022, she performed at the Hunan TV & Mango TV New Year's Concert, and appeared as the daughter of Yao Chen's character in the television series Rock It, Mum.

In 2023, Zhuang starred in her first major film role in Johnny Keep Walking! as Penny, a recent university graduate who joins a large corporation as a junior employee, where film critic Derek Elley described her performance as "so good". She also played a legally savvy young woman who seeks to overturn her father's wrongful conviction in the period drama Miss Chun Is a Litigator, and a girl who has recently moved to the city in You Are Desire. She co-wrote and performed the OST song "Daydreaming" for the latter. In 2024, she reprised her role as Li Jinbu in Be My Friend, the film remake of I Don't Want To Be Friends With You. In 2025, she starred as Tong, a "no-nonsense" local farmer, in the film The Lychee Road, for which she was nominated for Best Actress in the 38th Hundred Flowers Awards. Fei Bi-an of Sin Chew Daily praised her performance for "conveying the loyalty and sense of responsibility in the jianghu", while Elley lamented that "more could have been made of" her role, writing that Zhuang "imbues her [with] so much character and pathos". She was also cast as Huang Rong in Tsui Hark's Legends of the Condor Heroes: The Gallants, a wuxia film adapted from Jin Yong's The Legend of the Condor Heroes. Her casting reportedly received a negative reception from some audiences, with criticism directed at both her acting and her departure from the novel's description of Huang Rong's appearance, with The Storm Media labelling her "industry-backed" for securing the role. However, film critic Sek Kei praised her appearance as "graceful and captivating" and called her performance "likeable", while Elley again remarked that it was a "pity" her role was so limited, saying she "could fill a whole separate film".

In 2026, she reprised her role as Penny in a cameo appearance in Make Zhonghe Great Again, the spin-off sequel to Johnny Keep Walking!. She is set to appear as Mia, the daughter of Donnie Yen's titular character, in the upcoming Hollywood action film Caine, a spin-off of the John Wick franchise.

== Filmography ==
| Year | Title | Role | Notes/Ref. |
|---|---|---|---|
| 2012 | Old Man's Wish | Young Zhou Shuang (周爽) | |
| 2018 | Miss Puff | Hou Paopao (小泡芙) | |
| 2023 | Johnny Keep Walking! | Penny (潘怡然) | |
| 2024 | Be My Friend | Li Jinbu (李進步) | |
| 2025 | The Lychee Road | Tong (阿僮) | |
| 2025 | Legends of the Condor Heroes: The Gallants | Huang Rong | |
| 2026 | The Decisive Moment | Guoguo (果果) | |
| 2026 | Make Zhonghe Great Again | Penny (潘怡然) | Cameo |
| TBA | Caine † | Mia | |

=== Television ===
| Year | Title | Role | Notes/Ref. |
|---|---|---|---|
| 2018 | Never Gone | Young Meng Xue (孟雪) | Guest role |
| 2019 | Mountains And Ocean | Xia Ruining (夏蕊寧) | Main role |
| 2020 | Eternal Love of Dream | Jie Lu (潔綠) | Main role |
| 2020 | Closer to You | Han Fei (韓菲) | Main role |
| 2020 | I Don't Want To Be Friends With You | Li Jinbu (李進步) | Main role |
| 2020 | Love Script | Luo Kaihuai (羅開懷) | Main role |
| 2022 | Binary Love | Zhou Linlin (周林林) | Main role |
| 2022 | Rock It, Mum | Bai Tian (白天) | Main role |
| 2023 | Miss Chun Is a Litigator | Chun Tumi (春荼蘼) | Main role |
| 2023 | You Are Desire | Lin Yujing (林語驚) | Main role |
| 2024 | My Wife's Double Life | Liu Rong (柳蓉) | Main role |
| 2025 | Eat Run Love | Ding Zhitong (丁之童) | Main role |

== Awards and nominations ==
| Year | Award | Category | Work | Result | Ref. |
|---|---|---|---|---|---|
| 2019 | 1st Global OTT Awards | Best Newcomer Actress | Mountains and Ocean | Won | |
| 2024 | 31st Beijing College Student Film Festival | Best Newcomer | Johnny Keep Walking! | Won | |
| 2026 | 38th Hundred Flowers Awards | Best Actress | The Lychee Road | Nominated | |
