= Chad Stahelski =

American stuntman and film director

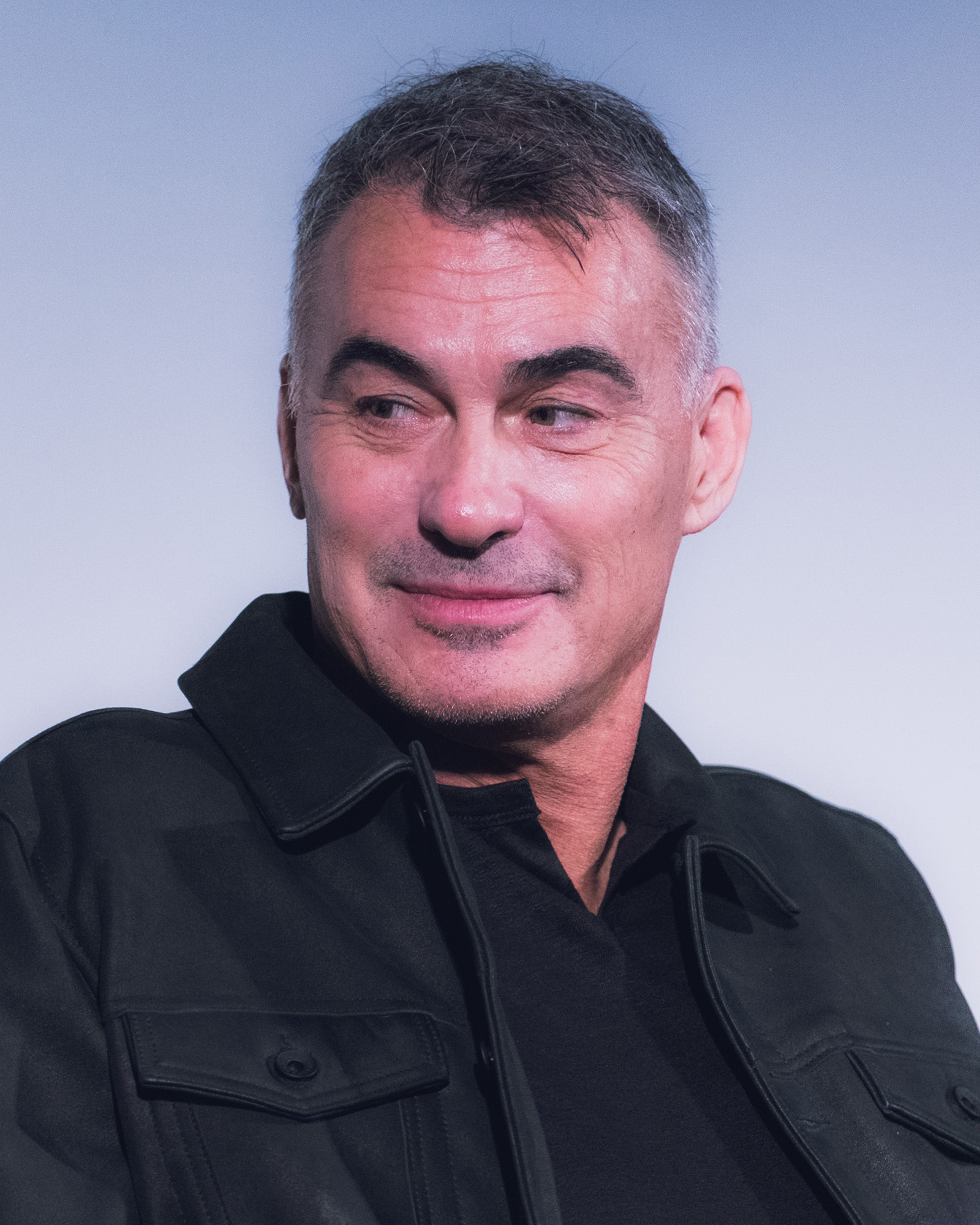
- Stahelski in 2025
- Born: September 20, 1968 (age 57); Palmer, Massachusetts, US
- Education: University of Southern California
- Occupations: Film director; stunt coordinator; second unit director; actor
- Years active: 1992–present

Charles F. Stahelski (born September 20, 1968) is an American stuntman and filmmaker. He is considered a highly-influential figure in the action film genre. He first achieved prominence as a stunt performer and coordinator, notably as the key stunt double for Keanu Reeves on The Matrix (1999), and as the martial arts stunt coordinator on its first two sequels. He subsequently directed the 2014 film John Wick, starring Reeves, and its three sequels.

== Biography ==
=== Martial arts training ===
Stahelski was born in Palmer, Massachusetts, to Gary and Kathleen Stahelski (née Diamond) in 1968. He began training in martial arts from a young age. He studied Jeet Kune Do under Dan Inosanto, and for a time was an instructor at Inosanto's school in Los Angeles.

Prior to his motion picture career, Stahelski competed in kickboxing and mixed martial arts. He was one of the earliest American competitors in Shooto. He fought Manabu Yamada in a 1993 Shooto event, losing in the first round from a kneebar submission.

Stahelski is an alumnus of the University of Southern California.

=== Stuntman (1993–2013) ===
Stahelski and fellow stuntman Jeff Cadiente served as stunt doubles for the actor Brandon Lee on the 1994 film The Crow. Accidentally wounded on set on March 31, 1993, by defective blank ammunition, Lee later died in hospital during surgery. Stahelski completed the remaining filming in place of Lee and special effects were used to superimpose Lee's face onto Stahelski.

In 1997, Stahelski co-founded action design company 87Eleven with David Leitch. The company has since split between an action design company and a production company, 87North Productions.

He worked as a stunt double for his future John Wick star Keanu Reeves in The Matrix franchise, and later served as a stunt co-ordinator for the films. Stahelski states that his experience working with martial arts choreographer Yuen Woo-ping heavily influenced his own approach to stunts.

In 2009, Stahelski was second-unit director and stunt co-ordinator on Ninja Assassin along with David Leitch, produced by Matrix directors The Wachowskis.

In 2012, on the set of the film The Expendables 2 for which Stahelski served as stunt coordinator, stuntman Kun Liu was killed by an explosion on set. Liu's family sued Stahelski following the accident.

=== Director (2014–present) ===
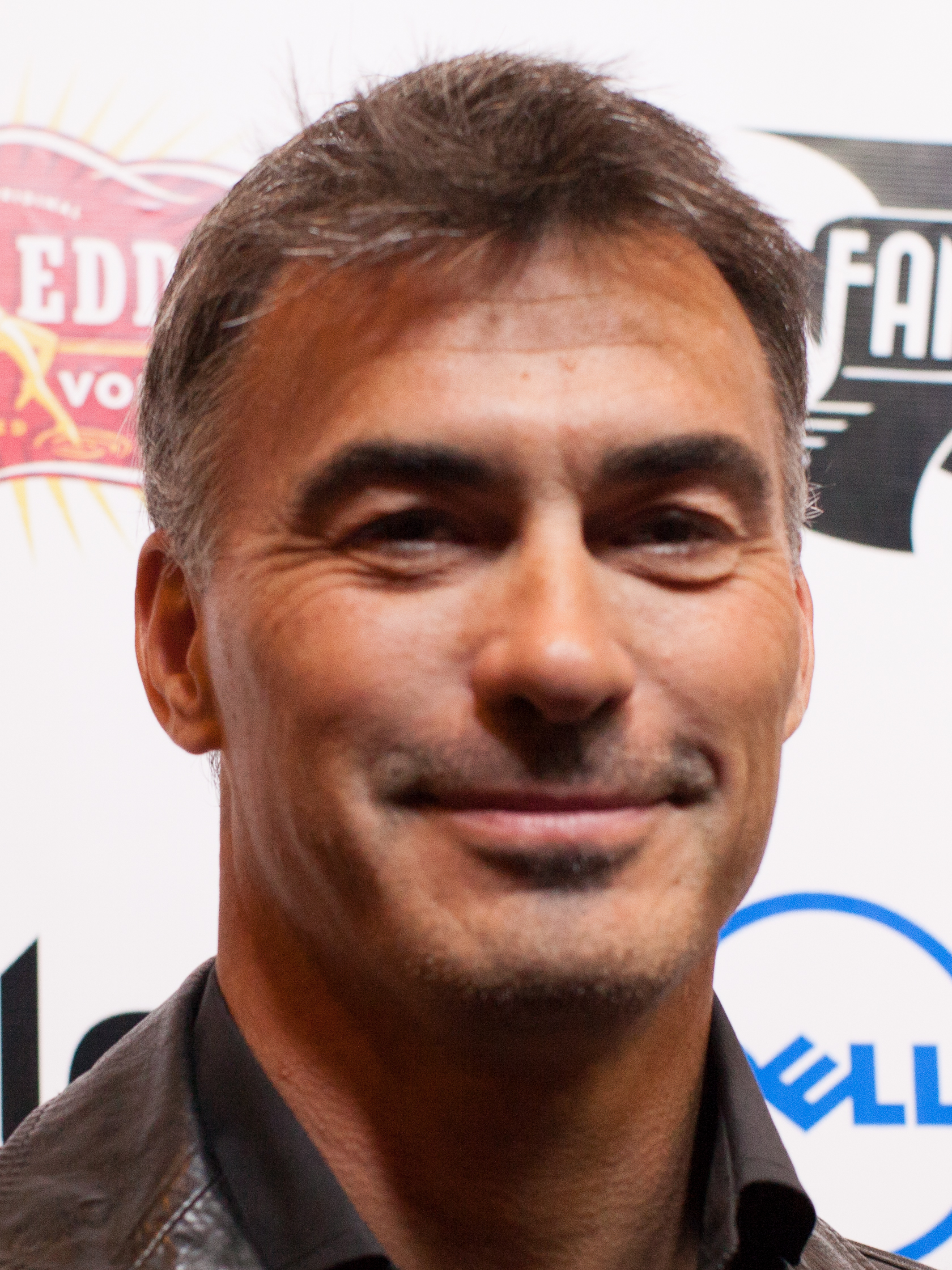
Stahelski at the John Wick red carpet premiere in Austin, Texas, September 19, 2014

In 2014, Stahelski made his feature directorial debut when he co-directed the action thriller film John Wick along with Leitch, based on the screenplay by Derek Kolstad. The film starred Keanu Reeves and Michael Nyqvist, and was released on October 24, 2014, by Summit Entertainment, grossing over $88 million. Stahelski acted as sole director for the film's 2017 sequel, John Wick: Chapter 2, and again for the third film, John Wick: Chapter 3 – Parabellum (2019) and fourth film, John Wick: Chapter 4 (2023). He also served as the second unit director for the reshoots of Birds of Prey.

In 2021, Stahelski returned to The Matrix franchise for its fourth installment, The Matrix Resurrections, making a cameo appearance as Trinity's "husband".

==== Upcoming ====
In March 2023, Stahelski clarified that a remake of Highlander as well as adaptations of Rainbow Six, Ghost of Tsushima, Black Samurai for Netflix, and Shibumi for Warner Bros. were the projects he was currently developing to produce and direct.

In July 2023, Adult Swim announced Lazarus, an upcoming original anime television series directed by Shinichirō Watanabe, with Stahelski designing the action sequences.

In February 2024, Lionsgate appointed Stahelski to oversee the John Wick and Highlander franchises. Stahelski will have creative oversight across film, TV and all multimedia platforms.

Other projects he has been attached to in the past include Analog, and adaptations of Kill or Be Killed, and Sandman Slim.

== Personal life ==
Stahelski was married to fellow stunt performer Heidi Moneymaker, but they divorced in 2018.

Stahelski was a friend of Brandon Lee and worked as his double. They trained together at the Inosanto Academy.

== Filmography ==
=== Films ===
Year	Title	Director	Producer	Notes
2014	John Wick	Yes	No	
2017	John Wick: Chapter 2	Yes	No	
2019	John Wick: Chapter 3 – Parabellum	Yes	Executive	
2020	Bruised	No	Executive	
2022	Day Shift	No	Yes	
2023	John Wick: Chapter 4	Yes	Yes	
2025	Ballerina	Uncredited (Note: Reshoots)	Yes	
2027	Karoshi	No	Yes	
TBA	Highlander	Yes	Yes	
TBA	Caine	No	Yes	Also Story Writer

Second-unit director

Year	Title	Director	Notes
2009	Ninja Assassin	James McTeigue	Alongside David Leitch
2011	Sherlock Holmes: A Game of Shadows	Guy Ritchie	
2012	The Expendables 2	Simon West	
2012	Safe	Boaz Yakin	
2013	After Earth	M. Night Shyamalan	Alongside Jeff Habberstad
2013	Escape Plan	Mikael Håfström	Alongside David Leitch
2013	The Hunger Games: Catching Fire	Francis Lawrence	Also supervising stunt co-ordinator
2015	Hitman: Agent 47	Aleksander Bach	Alongside David Leitch
2016	Grimsby	Louis Leterrier	
2016	Captain America: Civil War	Anthony and Joe Russo	Alongside David Leitch
2020	Birds of Prey	Cathy Yan	Also stunt coordinator

Stuntwork

Year	Title	Notes
1994	The Crow	Brandon Lee-Stunt Double (Reshoots Uncredited) Credited As Chad Storelson
1996	Escape from L.A.	
1997	Bean	
1997	Orgazmo	
1998	Recoil	
1998	Almost Heroes	
1998	The Hunted	Stunts/Stunt Coordinator
1999	8mm	
1999	The Matrix	Keanu Reeves' Stunt Double
1999	Wild Wild West	
2000	Picking Up The Pieces	
2000	The Replacements	(Keanu Reeves' Stunt Double (Uncredited)
2000	The Gift	Uncredited stunts
2001	Tomcats	
2001	Ghosts of Mars	
2001	Rock Star	
2001	Corky Romano	
2003	The Matrix Reloaded	Martial Arts Stunt Coordinator
2003	The Matrix Revolutions	Martial Arts Stunt Coordinator
2004	Torque	Stunt Driver (Uncredited)
2004	Van Helsing	Fight Coordinator/Assistant Stunt Coordinator
2004	Spider-Man 2	Uncredited
2004	Cellular	Utility Stunts (Uncredited)
2005	Thumbsucker	
2005	Constantine	Fight Choreographer (Uncredited)
2005	XXX: State of the Union	
2005	Mr. & Mrs. Smith	Utility Stunts
2005	The Dukes of Hazzard	Johnny Knoxville-Stunt Double (Uncredited)
2005	Serenity	Stunt Coordinator
2005	Æon Flux	Uncredited
2005	V for Vendetta	
2006	Beerfest	Stunt Coordinator
2006	300	Fight Choreographer
2007	Next	
2007	Live Free or Die Hard	
2007	Shoot 'Em Up	Uncredited
2007	I Am Legend	Uncredited
2008	Jumper	
2008	Speed Racer	Supervising Stunt Coordinator
2009	X-Men Origins: Wolverine	Action Coordinator
2009	Ninja Assassin	Stunt Coordinator
2010	Iron Man 2	Utility Stunts
2010	The Expendables	Stunt Coordinator
2010	Tron: Legacy	Uncredited
2011	Season of the Witch	Uncredited
2011	The Mechanic	Stunt Coordinator
2011	Immortals	Fight Choreographer
2012	Safe	Supervising Stunt Coordinator
2012	Dredd	Action Coordinator
2013	G.I. Joe: Retaliation	Assistant Stunt Coordinator
2013	The Wolverine	Stunt Coordinator (Uncredited)
2013	47 Ronin	Stunt Coordinator (Uncredited)
2013	Homefront	
2014	Captain America: The Winter Soldier	Uncredited
2018	Deadpool 2	
2024	Deadpool & Wolverine	

Actor

Year	Title	Role	Notes
1995	Nemesis 2: Nebula	Nebula	
1995	Fight Zone	Ski	
1997	Bloodsport III	Max Omega	
1998	Vampires	Male Master No. 4	
1998	Buffy the Vampire Slayer	Kulak	Episode: Homecoming
2021	The Matrix Resurrections	Chad	

Other

Year	Title	Role	Notes
2025	Wick Is Pain	Himself	Also executive producer, documentary film

== See also ==
- Chad Stahelski's unrealized projects
