= Derek Kolstad =

American screenwriter (born 1974)

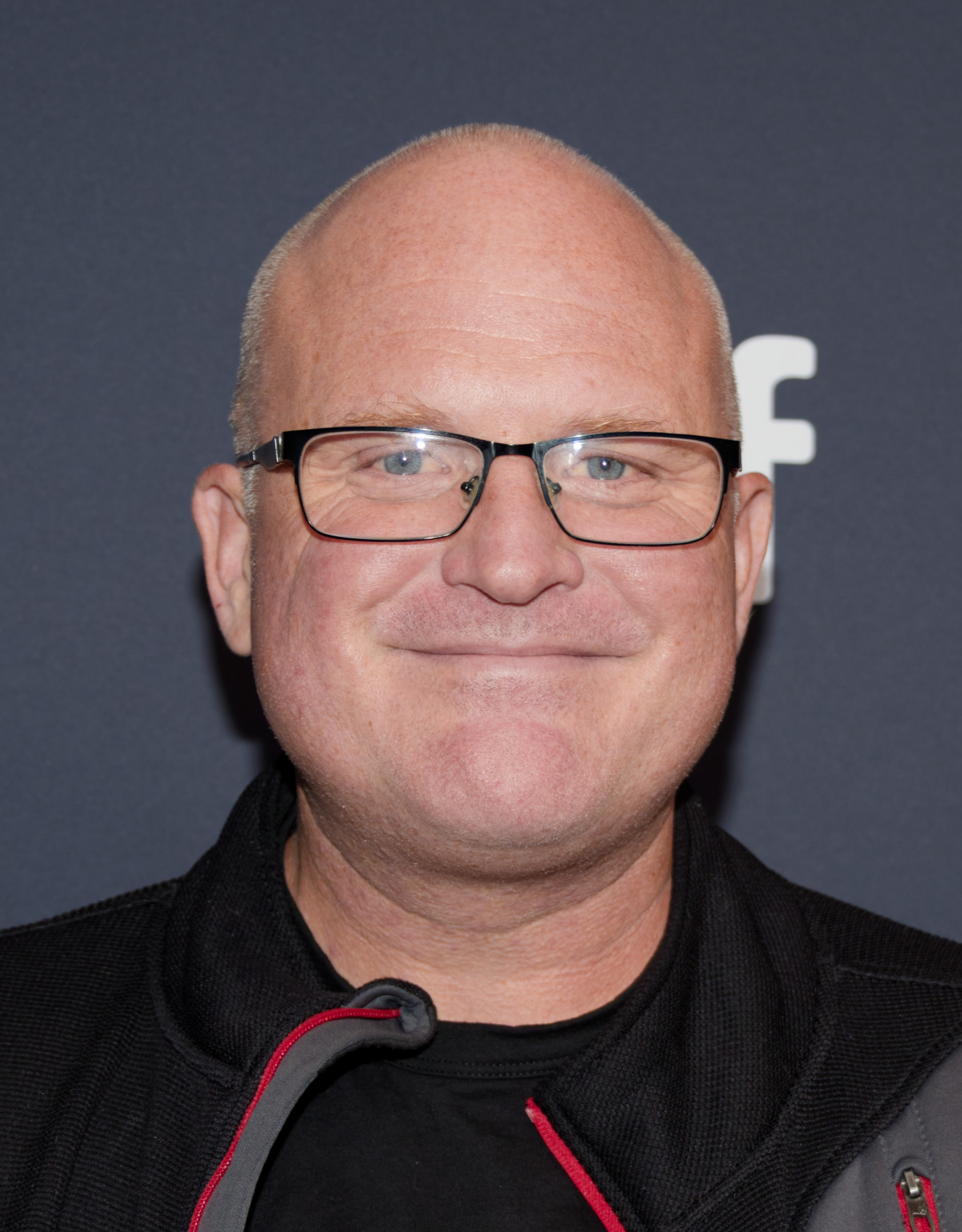
- Kolstad in 2025
- Born: April 4, 1974 (age 52); Madison, Wisconsin, U.S.
- Occupations: Screenwriter; film producer
- Known for: Creator of the John Wick franchise
- Style: Action thriller films

Derek Kolstad (born April 4, 1974) is an American screenwriter and film producer. He is the creator of the John Wick franchise, which began in 2014. He continued to write for the first two sequels of the franchise and is mainly known as a screenwriter of action films and shows.

== Biography ==
Originally from Madison, Wisconsin, Kolstad attended Edgewood High School of the Sacred Heart and later studied business administration at Taylor University in Indiana. He moved to California at age 24 to pursue screenwriting. He says he started writing films when he was a teenager, but he struggled to find success in Hollywood at first.

=== Career ===
The first script he sold was called Acolyte, which was purchased by Voltage Pictures in June 2012. After that, he got some writing and re-writing work, including work on One in the Chamber, starring Dolph Lundgren and Cuba Gooding Jr. He then wrote The Package, which also starred Lundgren.

Kolstad sold a script titled Scorn to Thunder Road Pictures, which signed Keanu Reeves for the lead role in April 2013. At Reeves' suggestion, the film was renamed John Wick after the title character, whom Kolstad had named after his maternal grandfather. The film was released in 2014 and was followed by John Wick: Chapter 2 in 2017 and John Wick: Chapter 3 – Parabellum in 2019. Kolstad wrote the video game John Wick: Chronicles and was involved with the creation of a comic book series. However, he was not asked by the studio to continue writing for the fourth or subsequent films.

In 2017, it was reported that Kolstad would write a live-action television adaptation of the Hitman franchise as well as an action-thriller titled The Steward. In 2019, it was reported that Kolstad would write and produce a live-action film adaptation of the Just Cause franchise. In 2020, Netflix announced that Kolstad would be an executive producer and writer on a Splinter Cell anime series. In 2021, Kolstad was hired to write the screenplay for a live-action adaptation of Hellsing for Amazon Prime Video.

Kolstad wrote the screenplay for the 2021 film Nobody starring Bob Odenkirk, and two episodes of the 2021 Marvel Studios television series The Falcon and the Winter Soldier.

== Personal life ==
Kolstad lives in Pasadena, California with his wife Sonja and twin children.

== Filmography ==
Also credited as "characters created" in the John Wick franchise.

Film

Year	Title	Writer	Producer	Director
2012	One in the Chamber	Yes	No	William Kaufman
2013	The Package	Yes	No	Jesse V. Johnson
2014	John Wick	Yes	No	Chad Stahelski; David Leitch
2017	John Wick: Chapter 2	Yes	No	Chad Stahelski
2019	John Wick: Chapter 3 – Parabellum	Yes	No	Chad Stahelski
2021	Nobody	Yes	Executive	Ilya Naishuller
2025	Nobody 2	Yes	Executive	Timo Tjahjanto
2025	Normal	Yes	Yes	Ben Wheatley
TBA	Painter	Yes	Yes	Garrett Warren
TBA	The Reckoner	Yes	Yes	Kenji Tanigaki

Television

Year(s)	Title	Writer	Executive producer	Notes
2020	Die Hart	Story	No	Also creator
2021	The Falcon and the Winter Soldier	Yes	Co-executive	Episodes "Power Broker" and "The Whole World Is Watching"
2023	The Continental: From the World of John Wick	No	Yes	
2025–present	Splinter Cell: Deathwatch	Yes	Yes	Also creator

Documentary appearance

- Wick Is Pain (2025)
