= List of Lionsgate films =

This is a list of feature films produced and/or distributed by Lionsgate Films.

== Lists ==
The films are divided into lists by decade:

- List of Lionsgate films (1997–1999)
- List of Lionsgate films (2000–2009)
- List of Lionsgate films (2010–2019)
- List of Lionsgate films (2020–2029)
- List of Lionsgate theatrical animated feature films

== See also ==
- 3 Arts Entertainment
- Amblin Entertainment (films)
- Anchor Bay Entertainment
- Artisan Entertainment
- Carolco Pictures
- Christal Films
- DreamWorks Pictures (films)
- Good Universe (films)
- Lionsgate Canada (films)
- Lionsgate UK
- Mandate Pictures
- Maple Pictures
- Momentum Pictures
- Overture Films
- Pantelion Films
- Phase 4 Films
- Roadside Attractions (films)
- Spyglass Media Group
- Starz Entertainment
- StudioCanal (films)
- Summit Entertainment (films)
- Trimark Pictures
- Vestron Pictures
