= List of Lionsgate Canada productions =

This article shows a complete list of productions produced and/or distributed by Lionsgate Canada (previously known as Entertainment One (eOne)), a Canadian entertainment company based in Toronto, Ontario, Canada, and the entities that it had previously either acquired or had stakes in.

Throughout its history, the company was primarily involved in the acquisition, production and distribution of films, music and television shows. Since Canadian-founded American-based Lionsgate acquired the company on December 27, 2023, and with the subsequent spin-off and restructuring with Liongate's other film and television businesses into Lionsgate Studios that was completed on May 14, 2024, eOne Films is the only Lionsgate division or subsidiary currently using the "eOne" name.

== Films ==
=== Entertainment One ===
Title	Release date	Notes
Half Nelson	2006	Produced by THINKFilm, Canadian distribution only
A Shine of Rainbows	2009	Co-produced with Octagon and Sepia Films
Barney's Version	2010	Co-produced with Serendipity, Canadian distribution
Virginia	2010	Co-produced with TicTock Studios
A Beginner's Guide to Endings	2011	Produced by Buck Productions and Darius Films
Your Highness	2011	U.K. and Irish distribution only; produced by Universal Pictures and Stuber Pictures
Killing Them Softly	2012	Produced by Plan B, Chockstone Pictures, 1984 Private Defense Contractors, Inferno and Annapurna Pictures, Canadian distribution
13 Eerie	2013	Co-produced with Minds Eye Entertainment and Don Carmody Productions
20 Feet from Stardom	2013	Produced by Radius-TWC. Canadian distribution
American Hustle	2013	Produced by Columbia Pictures, Atlas Entertainment and Annapurna Pictures, Canadian distribution only
The Snow Queen 2	2015	Co-produced with Wizart Animation, Bazelevs, Cinema Fund Russia, U.S. distribution only
Official Secrets	2019	Co-produced with Screen Yorkshire
Love and Monsters	2020	Co-produced with Paramount Pictures and 21 Laps Entertainment
Happiest Season	2020	Co-produced with Tristar Pictures and Temple Hill Entertainment. Distributed by Hulu (United States) and Sony Pictures Releasing (International)
Come From Away	2021	Co-produced with RadicalMedia, Apple Studios, Junkyard Dog Productions, and Alchemy Media Group. Distributed by Apple TV+.

=== Phase 4 Films ===
Title	Release date	Notes
Disco Worms	2008	
XIII: The Conspiracy	2008	
The Poker House	2008	
House of Fallen	2008	
Garrison	2008	
Guns	2008	
Sticks and Stones	2008	
The No Sit List	2009	
Luke and Lucy: The Texas Rangers	2009	
Police Patrol	2009	
Poker Run	2009	
Adopted	2009	
All American Orgy	2009	Produced by Finish Films and Louisiana Media Productions
Red Hook	2009	
Rigged	2009	under Peace Arch
Fling	2009	under Peace Arch, produced by Steele Films
JCVD	2009	under Peace Arch, produced by Gaumont and RTBF
Rock the Paint	2009	
Familiar Strangers	2009	
God Send Me a Man	2010	
Veronika Decides to Die	2010	Produced by Future Films, Velvet Octopus, Das Films, Muse Productions, Velvet Steamroller Entertainment, and PalmStar Entertainment
The Tomb	2010	
Crush	2010	
Deadland	2010	Produced by Deadeye Films
Frogs and Toads: Max's Magical Journey	2010	
Ultimate Heist	2010	
Finding Bliss	2010	
The Killing Room	2010	Produced by Winchester Capital Partners, Management 360, and Eleven Eleven Films
Bloodrayne: The Third Reich	2010	Produced by Boll Kino Beteiligungs GmbH & Co. KG and Herald Productions
Caged Animal	2010	
Terror Trap	2010	Produced by American World Pictures, Dan Garcia Productions, DMG Holdings, Most Wanted Films
Hanna's Gold	2010	
Love & Distrust	2010	
Supreme Champion	2010	
Nic & Tristan Go Mega Dega	2010	
The Dead Undead	2010	
Enemies Among Us	2010	
Harm's Way	2010	
Vidal Sassoon: The Movie	2010	
The Final Storm	2010	Produced by Event Film, Brightlight Pictures, Boll Kino Beteiligungs GmbH & Co. KG, Flood Productions
What Would Jesus Do?	2010	
Good Intentions	2010	
Freestyle	2010	
Order of Chaos	2010	
Let God Be the Judge	2010	
Machete Joe	2010	
The Freebie	2010	
Drones	2010	
American Maniacs	2010	
Gnomes and Trolls: The Forest Trial	2010	
Journey to Promethea	2010	Produced by DMG Holdings
Nexus	2010	
Perfect Life	2010	
Scar	2010	
Wushu Warrior	2010	
Cornered!	2010	Produced by Maze Films
Attack on Darfur	2010	
Dead Man Running	2010	
Brotherhood	2010	
Hugh Hefner: Playboy, Activist and Rebel	2010	Produced by Methapor Films
Forget Me Not	2010	Produced by Vindicated Pictures
Rampage	2010	
Outrage: Born in Terror	2010	
I Do & I Don't	2010	
Among Dead Men	2010	
Adventures of Power	2010	Produced by Grack Films, SpaceTime Films, and The Group Entertainment
The Voyages of Young Doctor Dolittle	2011	
Chick Magnet	2011	
Blubberella	2011	Produced by Boll KG Productions and Event Film Productions
Flesh Wounds	2011	
Hopelessly in June	2011	
Mayor Cupcake	2011	
Lucky	2011	
Rid of Me	2011	
The Legend of Hell's Gate: An American Conspiracy	2011	
Knockout	2011	
Absentia	2011	
InSight	2011	Produced by Braeburn Entertainment, Check Entertainment, and G.C. Pix
Another Happy Day	2011	Produced by Mandalay Vision, Taggart Productions, Cineric, Fimula Entertainment, New Mexico Media Partners, and Prop Blast Films
Red State	2011	
Budz House	2011	
Doggie B	2011	
Kiss the Bride	2011	
Open Gate	2011	
Contract Killers	2011	
Kill Katie Malone	2011	Produced by Artifact 2613, Illuminary Pictures, Scatena & Rosner Films
Sweet Karma	2011	
Dear Lemon Lima	2011	Produced by Garden of Eden Entertainment
Stories USA	2011	
The Wild Soccer Bunch 2	2011	
Grizzly Park	2011	
A Christmas Puppy	2012	
Bad Kids Go to Hell	2012	Produced by Spiderwood Studios
Extracted	2012	Produced by New Artists Alliance
Backwards	2012	
My Awkward Sexual Adventure	2012	Produced by Julijette, Banana-Moon Sky Films, and Kosher Sexy Films
Heathens and Thieves	2012	
Little Red Wagon	2012	
Alter Egos	2012	Produced by Attic Light Films, Cloud 9 Film Partners, and Off Hollywood Pictures
Sassy Pants	2012	Produced by Ministry of Content, Sassy Pictures, Spruce Street Films, and Urbanite
Scary or Die	2012	Produced by Canal Street Films and Bleuman
Sushi Girl	2012	
Parasitic	2012	
Smitty	2012	Produced by TriCoast Worldwide
See Girl Run	2012	Produced by Happy Couples Productions
Electrick Children	2012	Produced by Live Wire Films
That's What She Said	2012	Produced by Daisy 3 Pictures
Barrio Tales	2012	
Hick	2012	Produced by Stone River Productions, Lighthouse Entertainment, and Taylor Lane Productions
Tetherball	2012	
A Good Funeral	2012	
Bindlestiffs	2012	Produced by Green Stoplight Productions
House Hunting	2012	
A Little Bit of Faith	2012	
Ivan the Incredible	2012	Produced by Crone Film
Otto the Rhino	2013	
Crave	2013	Produced by Iron Helmet and Another Green World Productions
Bold Eagles	2013	
The Jungle Book: Return 2 The Jungle	2013	
The Jungle Book	2013	
The Short Game	2013	
Adventures in the Sin Bin	2013	Produced by Moviola
Compulsion	2013	
I Declare War	2013	Produced by Samaritan Entertainment
Crazy Kind of Love	2013	Produced by Smokewood Entertainment
The Crash Reel	2013	Produced by Impact Partners and Tree Tree Tree
Generation Um...	2013	Produced by Company Films and Voltage Pictures
Hemorrhage	2013	Produced by BMC Pictures and Random Bench Productions
The Dirties	2013	Produced by SModcast Pictures
The Black Dahlia Haunting	2013	
Assault on Wall Street	2013	Produced by Event Film and Lynn Peak
Eden	2013	Produced by Centripetal Films
Dark Tourist	2013	Produced by Vision Entertainment Group
An Easter Bunny Puppy	2013	
A Talking Cat!?!	2013	Produced by Rapid Heart Films
Caroline and Jackie	2013	Produced by Blueberry Films
Alien Uprising	2014	
Ask Me Anything	2014	Produced by Decipher Entertainment, Presque Isle Films, and Tait Productions
Butcher Boys	2014	
Take Care	2014	
Some Girl(s)	2014	Produced by Pollution Studios
A Country Christmas	2014	
A Merry Friggin' Christmas	2014	Produced by Sycamore Pictures
Saturday Morning Massacre	2014	
Switchmas	2014	Produced by Von Piglet Productions
Fort Bliss	2014	Produced by Yeniceri Produksiyon A.S. and Voltage Pictures
Black Rock	2014	Produced by Submarine Productions and LD Entertainment
Palo Alto	2014	Produced by Rabbit Bandini Productions and American Zoetrope
A Night in Old Mexico	2014	Produced by Quentin Quayle Pictures, Globomedia Cine, Telefonica Studios, Maxmedia, Flywheel & Shyster, Wittliff Productions, Prospect Park, TVE, ICAA, Viva Texas, and VT Films
Come Morning	2014	
Goodbye World	2014	Produced by Gather Films, Picturesque Films
Jamesy Boy	2014	Produced by Star Thrower Entertainment, Synergics Films, Gama Entertainment Partners
The Wedding Pact	2014	
After the Dark	2014	Produced by An Olive Branch Productions and SCTV
Agent F.O.X.	2014	
Free Ride	2014	Produced by Aberration Films, Casm Films, and Pantry Films
The Culture High	2014	
Bucksville	2014	
American Milkshake	2015	Produced by SModcast Pictures
Darkroom	2015	
Miss Meadows	2015	Produced by Myriad PIctures and Rob Carliner Films
Glass Chin	2015	Produced by OneZero Productions
Not Human	2015	
10 Cent Pistol	2015	Produced by Route 17 Entertainment
Walter	2015	Produced by Demarest Films, Zero Gravity Management, Barry Films, Purple Bench Films, Live Through the Heart, and Future Films

=== Momentum Pictures ===
Title	Release date	Notes
Imba Means Sing	2015	
The Wannabe	2015	Produced by Electric Entertainment and Traction Media
Indigenous	2016	Produced by Killburn Media
Intruders	2016	Produced by Vicarious Entertainment, Room 101, Jeff Rice Films, and Campbell-Grobman Films
All Roads Lead to Rome	2016	Produced by Ambi Pictures and Paradox Studios, North American distribution only
Forsaken	2016	Produced by Minds Eye Entertainment, Panacea Entertainment, Rollercoaster Films, and Moving Pictures Media, North American distribution only
Ava's Possessions	2016	Produced by Ravenous Films, Traction Media, and Off Hollywood Pictures, North American distribution only
Bling	2016	Produced by Digiart Productions and Digital Idea, North American distribution only
The Asian Connection	2016	
Hard Sell	2016	Produced by Yellow Cote Productions
Andron	2016	
Septembers of Shiraz	2016	Produced by G-BASE and Millennium Films
Quitters	2016	Produced by AgX, Frederick & Ashbury, and Pretty Moving Pictures
The Perfect Weapon	2016	Produced by VMI Worldwide, Steamroller Productions, Boundless Pictures, and ITN Distribution
Ithaca	2016	Produced by Apple Lane Productions
Milton's Secret	2016	Produced by Buck Productions and Hulo Films
The Late Bloomer	2016	Produced by Ineffable Pictures, Eclectic Pictures, and Millennium Films
Jack Goes Home	2016	Produced by Yale Productions and SSS Entertainment
The Possession Experiment	2016	
My Dead Boyfriend	2016	Produced by Cohen Media Group
Pocket Listing	2016	Produced by Helios Productions and Mythmaker Productions
Run the Tide	2016	Produced by Vicarious Entertainment and 1821 Pictures
Abattoir	2016	Produced by Dark Web Productions
Zombie Massacre 2: Reich of the Dead	2017	
Bad Kids of Crestview Academy	2017	Produced by Bad Kids Productions
Wheeler	2017	
Blowtorch	2017	
In Dubious Battle	2017	Produced by AMBI Pictures, Rabbit Bandini Productions, and That's Hollywood Pictures Productions
The Institute	2017	Produced by Jeff Rice Films, Redwire Pictures, Campbell Grobman Films, and Dark Rabbit Productions
Devil in the Dark	2017	
Voice from the Stone	2017	Produced by Zanuck Independent, Code 39 Films, Producer Capital Fund
The Shadow Effect	2017	
Manhattan Undying	2017	
The Gracefield Incident	2017	
Fun Mom Dinner	2017	Produced by June Pictures and Gettin Rad Productions
6 Below: Miracle on the Mountain	2017	Produced by Tooley Productions, Rockpile Studios, and Sonar Entertainment
The Girl Who Invented Kissing	2017	Produced by An Olive Branch Productions and 308 Enterprises
Mom and Dad	2018	Produced by Armory Films, XYZ Films, and The Fyzz Facility
The Clapper	2018	Produced by Oriah Entertainment, Cedarvale Pictures, LTD Films, Pacific Electric Picture Company, and Skit Bags
Looking Glass	2018	Produced by Highland Film Group, Kirk Shaw Productions, Prettybird, Silver State Production Services, and Ingenious Media
Half Magic	2018	Produced by The Bubble Factory
Beast of Burdena	2018	Produced by Paul Schiff Productions, Alde Entertainment, WYSJ Media, MGMT Entertainment Productions, Coastal Film Studios, Aperture Media Partners, and Peak Distribution Partners
The Last Witness	2018	Produced by Vicarious Productions, Dignity Film Finance, Film Polska Production, and Rosevine Films, North American distribution only
211	2018	Produced by Millennium Films
Boarding School	2018	Produced by Farcaster Films, Gigantic Pictures, Maven Pictures, Old Greenwich Capital Partners, and Storyland Pictures
I Think We're Alone Now	2018	Produced by Automatik Entertainment, Exhibit Entertainment, IM Global, Ferrotame Films, Slater Hall Pictures, and Estuary Films
Asher	2018	
Among the Shadows	2019	Produced by Nomenclature Film, Jay-X Entertainment, and Future Proof Films
Finding Steve McQueen	2019	Produced by Paradox Studios, Identity Films, and AMBI Media Group
Haunt	2019	Produced by Sierra Pictures, Broken Road Productions, and Nickel City Pictures
A Million Little Pieces	2019	Produced by Makeready, Snoopsquirrel, The Picture Company, 3blackdot, and Federal Films
Disturbing the Peace	2020	Produced by The Wonderfilm Media Corporation, Daniel Grodnik Productions, and Aloe Entertainment
Escape from Pretoria	2020	Produced by South Australian Film Corporation, Particular Crowd, Spier Films, Enriched Media Group, Storybridge Films, Footprint Films, and Beagle Pug Films
Stage Mother	2020	Produced by Film Mode Entertainment and Branded Pictures Entertainment
The 2nd	2020	Produced by The Wonderfilm Media Corporation, Turbo Panda Productions, Kalispel Films, Lucid Films, Daniel Grodnik Productions, Fury Film Franchise, and Voltage Pictures
The Devil Has a Name	2020	Produced by Four Horsemen and Storyboard Media
Black Bear	2020	Produced by Oakhurst Entertainment, Productivity Media, Tandem Pictures, and Blue Creek Pictures
Port Authority	2021	Produced by RT Features, Madeleine Films, Sikelia Productions, Mubi, Rhea Films, Hercules Film Fund, and MK2 Films
Witch Hunt	2021	
All My Puny Sorrows	2022	Produced by Mulmur Feed Co., Sugar Shack Productions, and Carousel Pictures
Dashcam	2022	Produced by Blumhouse Productions, Shadowhouse Films, and BOO-URNS
Neon Lights	2022	
To Leslie	2022	Produced by BlueWater Lane Productions, Jason Shuman Productions, Eduardo Cisneros Productions, BCDF Pictures, Clair de Lune Entertainment, and Baral Waley Productions
Soft & Quiet	2022	Produced by Blumhouse Productions and Second Grade Teacher Productions
Swallowed	2023	Produced by All the Dead Boys, Leroi, and Witchcraft Motion Picture Company
Palm Trees and Power Lines	2023	Produced by Fiesta Island Films and Neon Heart Productions
Wildflower	2023	Produced by Limelight, Morning Moon, and Hunting Lane Films
Maximum Truth	2023	
War Pony	2023	Produced by Felix Culpa and Caviar

=== Alliance Communications ===
Title	Release date	Notes
Johnny Mnemonic	1995	Canadian distribution
The Sweet Hereafter	1997	Produced by Ego Film Arts, Canadian distribution

=== Alliance Atlantis ===
Title	Release date	Notes
Jacob Two Two Meets the Hooded Fang	1999	Produced by Odeon Films

=== Alliance Films ===
Title	Release date	Notes
Pan's Labyrinth	2006	Produced by Tequila Gang, Esperanto Filmoj, and Sententia Entertainment, Canadian distribution only
The Stone Angel	2007	
No Country for Old Men	2007	Produced by Miramax Films and Paramount Vantage, Canadian distribution only
Stone of Destiny	2008	Produced by Infinity Features Entertainment and The Mob Film Company
Passchendaele	2008	Produced by Damberger Film & Cattle, Rhombus Media, and Whizbang Films
Blindness	2008	Canadian distribution
Before Tomorrow	2008	Produced by Igloolik Isuma Productions
Lesbian Vampire Killers	2009	Produced by Velvet Bite and AV Pictures
Polytechnique	2009	
Sticky Fingers	2009	Produced by Caramel Films and Area 54 Films
Dorian Gray	2009	Produced by UK Film Council, Ealing Studios, Fragile Films, Aramid Entertainment, and Prescience Film Partnerships, Canadian distribution only
Suck	2009	Canadian distribution
Trailer Park Boys: Countdown to Liquor Day	2009	Produced by Trailer Park Productions and Top Sail
Don't You Forget About Me	2009	Produced by Stay The Course Productions
Moonlight Serenade	2009	Produced by Talestic Entertainment, Barnholtz Film, Chloe Film, and Identity Films, Canadian distribution only
Defendor	2010	Produced by Darius Films
GravyTrain	2010	
Gunless	2010	
The Trotsky	2010	Produced by Portman Entertainment Group
Rush: Beyond the Lighted Stage	2010	Produced by Banger Films
This Movie Is Broken	2010	Canadian distribution only
Dog Pound	2010	Produced by Canal+ and Telefilm Canada
FUBAR 2	2010	
Wrecked	2010	Produced by Independent Edge Films, Telefilm Canada, Three-Seven Entertainment, and Wrecked Productions, Canadian distribution only
Hard Core Logo 2	2010	Produced by Foundation Features
Hobo with a Shotgun	2011	Produced by Rhombus Media, Whizbang Films, Yer Dead Productions
Mulroney: The Opera	2011	Produced by Rhombus Media
Sacrifice	2011	Produced by Styx Productions and Zed Filmworks, Canadian distribution only
Repeaters	2011	Produced by Rampart Films, Raven West Films, and Resonance Films
Breakaway	2011	Produced by Viacom 18 Motion Pictures, Hari Om Productions, First Take Entertainment, Don Carmody Productions, and Whizbang Films, Canadian distribution only
Café de Flore	2011	Canadian distribution only
Afghan Luke	2011	Produced by Trailer Park Productions and Top Sail
Lloyd the Conqueror	2012	Produced by Fresh Dog and Matt Kelly Films
Goon	2012	Produced by No Trace Camping, Caramel Films, Don Carmody Productions, and Inferno Pictures
The Moth Diaries	2012	Produced by Samson Films, Mediamax, Strada Films, Telefilm Canada, Astral's Harold Greenberg Fund, Windmill Lane Pictures, Irish Film Board, Canadian distribution only
Antiviral	2012	Produced by Rhombus Media, Telefilm Canada, and TF1 International, Canadian distribution only
The Movie Out Here	2013	
Inescapable	2013	Produced by Foundry Films and Out of Africa Entertainment
Cottage Country	2013	Produced by Whizbang Films
Treading Water	2013	Produced by Rhombus Media, Redrum, Mecanismo Films, Telefilm Canada

== Shows ==
=== Entertainment One ===
Title	Network	Original running	Notes
Project Greenlight	HBO	2001–2005	Produced by Live Planet and Miramax Television, distribution only
Very Bad Men	Global	2007	Produced by Make Believe Media, distribution only
Hung	HBO	2009–2011	Co-produced with Tennessee Wolf Pack
The Walking Dead	AMC	2010–2022	International Distribution Only
Rookie Blue	ABC	2010–2015	Co-produced with Shaw Media, Thump, Inc. (seasons 1–2), Canwest and Ilana C. Frank Films (seasons 3–6)
Party at Tiffany's	OWN	2011	
Hell on Wheels	AMC	2011–2016	
Saving Hope	CTV, NBC, Ion	2012–2017	Co-produced with Bell Media and Ilana C. Frank Films
Mary Mary	We TV	2012–2017	
The Firm	NBC	2012	Co-produced with Lukas Reiter Productions, AXN Original Productions, Shaw Media and Paramount Pictures
Tornado Hunters	CMT	2014	Produced by Saloon Media, distribution only
Halt & Catch Fire	AMC	2014–2017	International Distribution Only
Turn	AMC	2014–2017	International Distribution Only
Fear the Walking Dead	AMC	2015–2023	International Distribution Only
The Book of Negroes	CBC	2015	
Private Eyes	Global, Ion	2016–2021	Co-produced with Piller-Segan
You Me Her	Audience	2016–2020	Co-produced with JSS Entertainment and Alta Loma Entertainment
Ice	Audience	2016–2018	Co-produced with Fuqua Films, Alcon Entertainment and IM Global Television
Ransom	CBS	2017–2019	Co-produced with Big Light Productions. Sienna Films. Wildcats Productions and Corus Entertainment
Mary Kills People	Global	2017–2019	
Cardinal	CTV	2017–2020	
The Manns	TV One	2017–present	Co-produced with Bobbcat Films
Growing Up Hip Hop: Atlanta	We TV	2017–2021	
The Detail	CTV, Ion	2018	Co-produced with ICF Films
America Says	Game Show Network	2018–2022	Co-produced with Keller/Noll and Game Show Enterprises
The Rookie	ABC	2018–present	
Burden of Truth	CBC	2018–2021	
Diggstown	CBC	2019–2022	Produced by Circle Blue Entertainment, Freddie Films Inc. and WildBrain, International distribution only
Tricky Dick	CNN	2019	Produced by Left/Right, International distribution only
Upright	Showcase	2019	
Transformers: War for Cybertron Trilogy	Netflix	2020–2021	Co-produced with Rooster Teeth and Polygon Pictures
Candy Land	Food Network	2020–present	Co-produced with Super Delicious
La Garçonne	France 2	2020–present	
Nurses	Global	2020–2021	
Power Rangers Dino Fury	Nickelodeon (2021); Netflix (2022)	2021–2022	Co-produced with Power Rangers Productions, Ltd. and Toei Company Ltd.
Project Bakeover	Food Network Canada	2021–2022	
Cruel Summer	Freeform	2021–2023	
Family Law	Global TV	2021–2026	
Yellowjackets	Showtime	2021–present	
The Rookie: Feds	ABC	2022–2023	
The Recruit	Netflix	2022–2025	
A Gentleman in Moscow	Paramount+ and Showtime	2023	
Power Rangers Cosmic Fury	Netflix	2023	Co-produced with Power Rangers Productions, Ltd. and Toei Company Ltd.
Mighty Morphin Power Rangers: Once & Always	Netflix	2023	Special co-produced with Power Rangers Productions, Ltd. and Toei Company Ltd.
Lodi	Amazon Prime	TBC	

=== eOne Kids & Family ===
Title	Network	Original running	Notes
Alien TV	9Go! Netflix	2019–2021	Co-produced with Pop Family Entertainment
My Little Pony: Pony Life	Discovery Family	2020–2021	Co-produced with Boulder Media

=== Contender Entertainment Group ===
Title	Network	Original running	Notes
Peppa Pig	Nick Jr. Channel 5	2004–present	Co-produced with Rubber Duck Entertainment

=== The Mark Gordon Company ===
Title	Network	Original running	Notes
LAX	NBC	2004	Co-produced with NBC Universal Television Studio and Nick Thiel Productions
Criminal Minds	CBS	2005–present	Co-produced with CBS Studios and ABC Signature
Grey's Anatomy	ABC	2005–present	Co-produced with Shondaland and ABC Signature
Army Wives	Lifetime	2007–2013	Co-produced with ABC Studios
Ray Donovan	Showtime	2013–2020	Co-produced with Showtime Networks
Youth & Consequences	YouTube Premium	2018	
Designated Survivor	ABC; Netflix	2016–2019	

=== Renegade 83 Entertainment ===
Title	Network	Original running	Notes
The 4400	USA Network	2004–2007	Co-produced with American Zoetrope, BSkyB, Renegade 83, 4400 Productions and Viacom Productions (2004), Paramount Television (2005) and CBS Paramount Television (2006–2007)
Naked and Afraid XL	Discovery Channel	2015	
You the Jury	Fox	2017	Co-produced with Ember Dot
Sugar	YouTube Premium	2018	Co-produced with 222 Productions, Big Kid Pictures and Renegade 83

=== Paperny Entertainment ===
Title	Network	Original running	Notes
Prairie Fire: The Winnipeg General Strike of 1919	History Television	1999	
The 100 Mile Challenge	Food Network	2009	

=== Alliance Communications ===
Title	Network	Original running	Notes
Due South	CBS/First-run syndication CTV	1994–1999	Canadian distribution only
