= Edward Beck =

Edward Beck may refer to:

- Edward Beck (British Army officer) (1880–1974)
- Edward Beck (Jericho), a fictional character in the television drama series Jericho
- Edward L. Beck, American Roman Catholic priest, television personality and writer
- Edward Beck (academic) (1848–1916), British academic
- Ed Beck (1936–2019), American basketball player
- Ted Beck, writer of All American Orgy
