= Former Ghosts =

US musical group

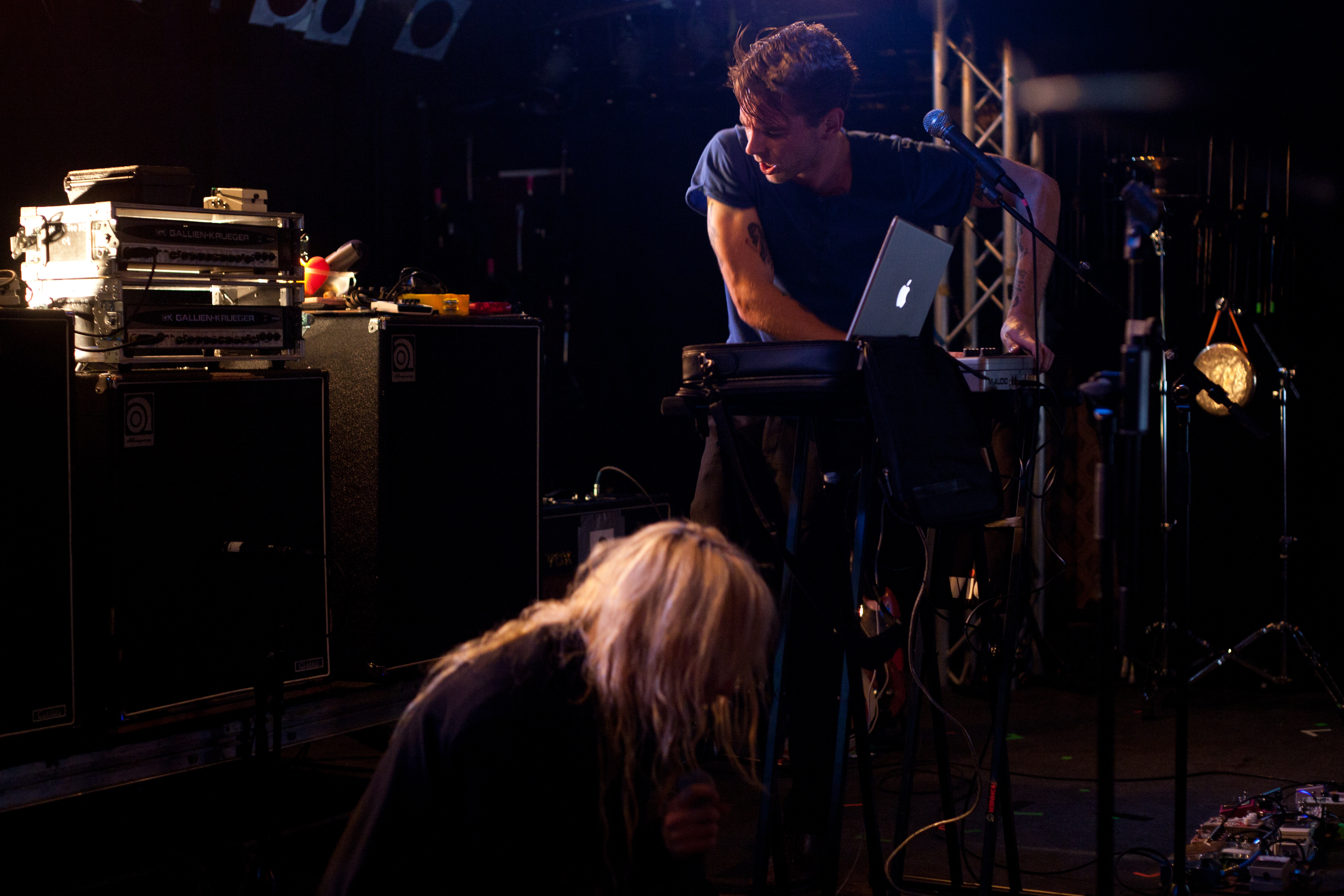
- Freddy Ruppert of Former Ghosts and Zola Jesus performing in Stockholm, November 2010.

Background information
- Genres: Synth-pop; Post-punk
- Labels: Upset The Rhythm; The Native Sound
- Members: Freddy Ruppert; Jamie Stewart; Nika Roza Danilova; Yasmine Kittles
- Website: formerghosts.com

Former Ghosts is a project of Freddy Ruppert, former member of This Song Is a Mess But So Am I, with loose collaborations from multiple people including Xiu Xiu frontperson Jamie Stewart, Zola Jesus originator Nika Roza Danilova, Yasmine Kittles of Tearist, Annie Lewandowski of Powerdove, and Carla Bozulich. Past live incarnations have included Jherek Bischoff and Sam Mickens. Ruppert is the lead songwriter on this project. The title of the debut, Fleurs, is a reference to the white-flowered iris (Iris germanica).

== Background ==
Ruppert envisioned a musical direction inspired by synth-pop. He noted the influence of New Order, while describing OMD as "probably the biggest influence" on Former Ghosts. Ruppert explained the formation of the band in a 2009 interview:

"A lot of the songs were written before Former Ghosts even really came together as a full on band. Once I had decided that this was going to be a new music project for me, having Jamie on board just came naturally. We had always talked about doing a project in this kind of style but both of our schedules were just too busy to actually do it, but then it ended up working out this time around. Nika got involved because I am a big fan of her band Zola Jesus and I asked her to sing on a song and when she sent it back to me I was so blown away that I knew that I needed her to be a part of this band!"

== Critical reception ==
Pitchfork said the debut single, "Hold On", "sounds like what might've happened to Joy Division if Ian Curtis had bought a Casio and a four-track and fired the rest of the band."

AllMusic gave Fleurs 3.5/5 stars and said that "Former Ghosts evoke isolation with a fearlessness that few of their peers can match."

The blog Fingers Become Thumbs listed Fleurs as their album of the year (2009), stating: "In all seriousness, this is a dark and intense record in which Ruppert really puts himself out there, so much so that even listening to it can be emotionally draining. In saying that, by the standards of its members its by no means a ‘difficult’ listen, and in fact was intended to be the synth-pop side-project of Freddy and Jamie."

Prefixmag.com found Fleurs to be "intermittently brilliant", but felt it could "benefit greatly from more collaboration and judicious editing of the track list".

== Discography ==
- Fleurs (2009)
- New Love (2010)
- Split 7" with Funeral Advantage (2015)

== Music videos ==
- Hold On (dir. Amir Shoucri) watch
- Flowers (dir. Paul Rodriguez) watch
- Taurean Nature (dir. Amir Shoucri) watch
