= Yasmine Kittles =

American musician and actress

Yasmine Kittles is an American musician, actress, and performance artist. She is a member of the bands Tearist, Former Ghosts, and Low Red Center. About her stage performances, Rolling Stone has written, "Aided by her hair-raising yelp – a voice ranging from an operatic shriek to a post-Lydia Lunch growl – Kittles is thunder onstage, her assault uniquely confrontational and her crowd's response visceral." She also writes for VICE Magazine as a guest columnist.

== Early life ==
Kittles was born in Frankfurt, Germany. As a child she moved from Germany to Tehran, Iran to residing in Dallas, Texas where she began figure skating. Kittles was a competitive figure skater with the ISI and USFSA for twelve years. She holds a Bachelor of Arts in Theatre and Dance with a concentration in Meisner technique and a minor in Psychology from the University of Texas at Austin.

== Discography ==
VOCALS, INSTRUMENTS & PERFORMANCE

=== TEARIST ===
| Album | Year | Label |
|---|---|---|
| Tearist | 2010 | PPM |
| Living: 2009–Present | 2011 | Thin Wrist Records |
| Purple Video | 2012 | Self-Released |

=== Former Ghosts ===
| Album | Year | Label |
|---|---|---|
| Fleurs | 2009 | Upset the Rhythm |
| New Love | 2010 | Upset the Rhythm |

=== Low Red Center ===
| Album | Year | Label |
|---|---|---|
| Low Red Center | 2008 | Instincto Records |
| Low Red Center S/T | 2009 | S-S Records |
| Momentary Switch | 2009 | Answering Machine Recordings |

=== Spoon ===
| Album | Songs | Year | Label |
|---|---|---|---|
| Ga Ga Ga Ga Ga | "Rhythm and Soul" | 2007 | Merge Records |

=== ...And You Will Know Us By The Trail Of Dead ===
| Album | Songs | Year | Label |
|---|---|---|---|
| The Century of Self | "Bells of Creation"); "Pictures Of An Only Child" | 2009 | Justice Records; Richter Scale Records; Superball Music; Soyuz Music |

=== Pictureplane ===
| Album | Songs | Year | Label |
|---|---|---|---|
| Thee Physical | "Body Mod"); "Trancegender"; "Breath Work" | 2011 | Lovepump United |

=== Cerebral Ballzy ===
| Album | Songs | Year | Label |
|---|---|---|---|
| Jaded & Faded | "Better In Leather" | 2014 | Cult Records |

=== Heavy Seals ===
| Album | Year | Label |
|---|---|---|
| Neurotic Asphyxiation | 2011 | Fast Weapons |

== Filmography ==
| Title | Role | Year | Notes |
|---|---|---|---|
| Wedding Peach | Ranbo | 2005 | Co-starring (VO) |
| Gretchen | Marla Auschussler | 2006 | WON – Best Dramatic Feature – Los Angeles Film Festival |
| All American Orgy | Yasmine | 2009 | Starring |
| In Lust I | Her/ Yasmine | 2009 | Co-Creator, Starring |
| Pound House | Jasmine | 2013–2014 | Starring, 4 Episodes |
| Video Town | Judy | 2013 | Co-starring |
| In Lust III | Her/ Yasmine | 2015 | Co-Creator, Starring |
| The 4TH | Jenny | 2016 | Starring |

== Television ==
| Title | Role | Year | Notes |
|---|---|---|---|
| Last Call with Carson Daly | TEARIST | 2014 | TEARIST |
| Rage | TEARIST | 2015 – | Music Video, "Headless" |

== Other works ==
- SAY IT! – Digital Lips – Everyday Edition App, as LIPS (2009)
- SAY IT! – Digital Lips – Office Edition App, as LIPS (2009)
- SAY IT! – Digital Lips – Lite App, as LIPS (2009)
