= New Love (Former Ghosts album) =

Studio album by Former Ghosts
- Released: October 26, 2010
- Recorded: 2010
- Genre: Synthpop
- Length: 47:51
- Label: Upset the Rhythm

Former Ghosts chronology
Fleurs (2009)	New Love (2010)

Professional ratings
Aggregate scores
Source	Rating
Metacritic	67/100
Review scores
Source	Rating
Allmusic	3.5/5 stars
Clash	7/10
DIY	8/10
Drowned in Sound	8/10
Loud and Quiet	9/10
NME	7/10
Pitchfork Media	5.3/10
Popmatters	8/10
State	3/5 stars

New Love is the second album from experimental electronic group Former Ghosts, a collaborative effort between Jamie Stewart (Xiu Xiu), Freddy Ruppert (This Song is a Mess But So Am I), Yasmine Kittles (TEARIST) and Nika Roza Danilova (Zola Jesus).

== Track listing ==
1. "The Days Will Get Long Again"
2. "Winter's Year"
3. "New Orleans"
4. "Until You Are Alone Again"
5. "Chin Up"
6. "And When You Kiss Me"
7. "Taurean Nature"
8. "Trust"
9. "Right Here"
10. "I Am Not What You Want"
11. "Only in Time"
12. "Bare Bones"
13. "New Love"
