= List of Lionsgate films (2010–2019) =

This is a list of films produced and/or distributed by Lionsgate Films from 2010 to 2019. Since 1997, about 400 films have been released. As of November 2017, Lionsgate's films grossed approximately $8.2 billion.

Release date	Film	Notes
January 8, 2010	Daybreakers	co-production with Pictures in Paradise, Pacific Film and Television Commission and Furst Films
January 15, 2010	The Spy Next Door	North American distribution only; co-production with Relativity Media
February 5, 2010	From Paris with Love	U.S. distribution only; produced by EuropaCorp, M6 and Canal+
April 2, 2010	Why Did I Get Married Too?	co-production with Tyler Perry Studios
April 16, 2010	Kick-Ass	U.S. distribution only; produced by Marv Films and Plan B Entertainment
April 16, 2010	The Perfect Game	limited release
June 4, 2010	Killers	co-production with Katalyst Media
August 13, 2010	The Expendables	North American, U.K. and Irish distribution only; produced by Millennium Films
August 27, 2010	The Last Exorcism	U.S. distribution only; produced by StudioCanal and Strike Entertainment
September 3, 2010	The Winning Season	North American, U.K. and Irish distribution only; produced by Plum Pictures and Gigi Films
September 17, 2010	Alpha and Omega	co-production with Crest Animation Productions
September 24, 2010	Buried	limited release North American distribution only
October 29, 2010	Saw 3D	co-production with Twisted Pictures
November 5, 2010	For Colored Girls	co-production with Tyler Perry Studios and 34th Street Films
November 19, 2010	The Next Three Days	co-production with Highway 61 Films
December 17, 2010	Rabbit Hole	North American distribution only; produced by Olympus Pictures, Blossom Films and OddLot Entertainment
January 28, 2011	From Prada to Nada	limited release produced by Pantelion Films
March 18, 2011	The Lincoln Lawyer	U.S. distribution only; co-production with Lakeshore Entertainment and Sidney Kimmel Entertainment
April 8, 2011	No eres tú, soy yo	limited release
April 15, 2011	The Conspirator	U.S. co-distribution with Roadside Attractions only
April 22, 2011	Madea's Big Happy Family	co-production with Tyler Perry Studios
May 13, 2011	Everything Must Go	U.S. co-distribution with Roadside Attractions only
May 13, 2011	Go for It!	limited release
May 20, 2011	Blitz	
July 29, 2011	The Devil's Double	limited release North American co-distribution with Herrick Entertainment only
August 19, 2011	Conan the Barbarian	North American, UK and Irish distribution only; produced by Millennium Films and Emmett/Furla Films
September 2, 2011	Saving Private Perez	also known as Salvando al Soldado Perez limited release
September 9, 2011	Warrior	co-production with Mimran Schur Pictures
September 23, 2011	Abduction	co-production with Gotham Group, Vertigo Entertainment and Quick Six Entertainment
September 23, 2011	Machine Gun Preacher	international distribution only
October 14, 2011	Labios Rojos	limited release
October 21, 2011	Margin Call	U.S. co-distribution with Roadside Attractions only
December 2, 2011	Pastorela	limited release
January 27, 2012	One for the Money	U.S. distribution only; co-production with Lakeshore Entertainment and Sidney Kimmel Entertainment
February 24, 2012	Good Deeds	co-production with Tyler Perry Studios
March 9, 2012	Friends with Kids	U.S. co-distribution with Roadside Attractions only
March 9, 2012	Salmon Fishing in the Yemen	international distribution only; co-production with UK Film Council, BBC Films and Davis Films
March 16, 2012	Casa de Mi Padre	limited release produced by Pantelion Films
March 23, 2012	The Hunger Games	co-production with Color Force
April 13, 2012	The Cabin in the Woods	distribution only; produced by Mutant Enemy Productions
April 27, 2012	Safe	U.S. distribution only; produced by IM Global, Automatik, Lawrence Bender Productions and Trigger Street Productions
May 4, 2012	LOL	co-production with Mandate Pictures
May 18, 2012	What to Expect When You're Expecting	co-production with Alcon Entertainment and Phoenix Pictures
June 29, 2012	Madea's Witness Protection	co-production with Tyler Perry Studios
July 27, 2012	Step Up Revolution	distribution only; produced by Summit Entertainment and Offspring Entertainment
August 9, 2012	Hope Springs	international distribution only; produced by Mandate Pictures, Columbia Pictures, Metro-Goldwyn-Mayer, Escape Artists and Film 360
August 17, 2012	The Expendables 2	North American, UK and Irish distribution only; co-production with Millennium Films
August 24, 2012	Keith Lemon: The Film	
August 31, 2012	The Possession	co-production with Ghost House Pictures
September 7, 2012	The Cold Light of Day	distribution only; produced by Summit Entertainment and Intrepid Pictures
September 14, 2012	Arbitrage	U.S. co-distribution with Roadside Attractions only
September 21, 2012	Dredd	U.S. distribution only; co-production with Reliance Entertainment, IM Global and DNA Films
September 21, 2012	The Perks of Being a Wallflower	distribution only; produced by Summit Entertainment and Mr. Mudd
October 5, 2012	Escape Fire: The Fight to Rescue American Healthcare	
October 12, 2012	Sinister	U.S. distribution under Summit Entertainment only; produced by Alliance Films, IM Global, Blumhouse Productions and Automatik
October 19, 2012	Alex Cross	U.S. distribution under Summit Entertainment only; produced by Emmett/Furla Films, Block/Hanson Productions, James Patterson Entertainment, QED International and Envision Entertainment
October 26, 2012	Silent Hill: Revelation	International distribution outside France only; produced by Davis Films, Don Carmody Productions and Konami
November 2, 2012	The Bay	U.S. co-distribution with Roadside Attractions only
November 6, 2012	Gummibär: The Yummy Gummy Search For Santa	U.S. distribution only; produced by Gummybear International
November 16, 2012	The Twilight Saga: Breaking Dawn – Part 2	distribution only; produced by Summit Entertainment and Sunswept Entertainment
December 21, 2012	The Impossible	distribution outside Spain under Summit Entertainment only; produced by Telecinco Cinema and Apaches Entertainment
January 4, 2013	Texas Chainsaw 3D	North American, UK and Irish distribution only; produced by Millennium Films and Main Line Pictures
January 18, 2013	The Last Stand	co-production with Di Bonaventura Pictures
February 1, 2013	The Haunting in Connecticut 2: Ghosts of Georgia	co-production with Gold Circle Films
February 1, 2013	Stand Up Guys	U.S. distribution only; co-production with Sidney Kimmel Entertainment and Lakeshore Entertainment
February 1, 2013	Warm Bodies	distribution only; produced by Summit Entertainment and Mandeville Films
February 14, 2013	Beautiful Creatures	international distribution under Summit Entertainment only; produced by Alcon Entertainment, 3 Arts Entertainment and Belle Pictures
February 22, 2013	Snitch	U.S. distribution under Summit Entertainment only; produced by Participant Media and Exclusive Media
March 29, 2013	Temptation: Confessions of a Marriage Counselor	also known as Tyler Perry's The Marriage Counselor; co-production with Tyler Perry Studios
April 18, 2013	Penthouse North	international distribution only; co-production with Demarest Film, TAJJ Media, Bunk 11 Pictures and Kilburn Media
April 26, 2013	The Big Wedding	also known as The Wedding; North American, U.K. and Irish distribution only; produced by Millennium Films
April 26, 2013	Mud	U.S. co-distribution with Roadside Attractions only; produced by Everest Entertainment, Brace Cove Productions and FilmNation Entertainment
May 10, 2013	Peeples	also known as Tyler Perry's We the Peeples; co-production with 34th Street Films
May 31, 2013	Now You See Me	distribution only; produced by Summit Entertainment and K/O Paper Products
June 21, 2013	Much Ado About Nothing	North American co-distribution with Roadside Attractions only
June 28, 2013	Redemption	also known as Hummingbird; U.S., U.K. and Irish distribution only; produced by Shoebox Films and IM Global; co-distributed in the U.S. by Roadside Attractions
July 19, 2013	Red 2	distribution only; produced by Summit Entertainment, DC Entertainment and Di Bonaventura Pictures
August 23, 2013	The Frozen Ground	North American co-distribution with Grindstone Entertainment Group only
August 23, 2013	You're Next	
September 6, 2013	Riddick	uncredited; international distribution only; produced by One Race Films and Radar Pictures
September 20, 2013	Prisoners	international distribution outside Australia, New Zealand, Italy and Spain under Summit Entertainment only; produced by Alcon Entertainment, 8:38 Productions and Madhouse Entertainment
October 4, 2013	Grace Unplugged	U.S. co-distribution with Roadside Attractions only
October 8, 2013	Alpha and Omega 2: A Howl-iday Adventure	Direct-to-video; co-production with Crest Animation Productions and Assemblage Entertainment
October 18, 2013	Escape Plan	distribution under Summit Entertainment only; produced by Emmett/Furla Films and Mark Canton Productions
November 1, 2013	Ender's Game	North American distribution under Summit Entertainment only; produced by OddLot Entertainment, Chartoff Productions and Sierra/Affinity
November 8, 2013	Venus in Fur	international distribution outside France only
November 22, 2013	The Hunger Games: Catching Fire	co-production with Color Force
December 13, 2013	A Madea Christmas	also known as Tyler Perry's A Very Madea Christmas; co-production with Tyler Perry Studios
January 10, 2014	The Legend of Hercules	North American, U.K. and Irish distribution under Summit Entertainment only; produced by Millennium Films
January 17, 2014	Reasonable Doubt	U.S. co-distribution with Grindstone Entertainment Group only
January 24, 2014	I, Frankenstein	U.S. distribution only; co-production with Lakeshore Entertainment, Sidney Kimmel Entertainment and Hopscotch Features
February 7, 2014	Nurse 3D	
February 14, 2014	Date and Switch	
February 21, 2014	Pompeii	international distribution outside Germany and Austria under Summit Entertainment only; produced by Constantin Film, Impact Pictures and Don Carmody Productions
February 28, 2014	Repentance	
March 14, 2014	The Single Moms Club	co-production with Tyler Perry Studios
March 21, 2014	Divergent	distribution only; produced by Summit Entertainment and Red Wagon Entertainment
March 25, 2014	Alpha and Omega 3: The Great Wolf Games	Direct-to-video; co-production with Crest Animation Productions
April 11, 2014	Draft Day	distribution only; produced by Summit Entertainment, OddLot Entertainment and The Montecito Picture Company
April 18, 2014	Transcendence	international distribution outside China under Summit Entertainment only; produced by Alcon Entertainment, DMG Entertainment and Straight Up Films
April 25, 2014	The Quiet Ones	U.S., U.K. and Irish distribution only, produced by Hammer Film Productions
May 23, 2014	The Angriest Man in Brooklyn	North American distribution only
June 6, 2014	Burning Blue	
June 27, 2014	America: Imagine the World Without Her	
June 27, 2014	They Came Together	
July 25, 2014	My Man Is a Loser	
August 8, 2014	Step Up: All In	distribution only; produced by Summit Entertainment and Offspring Entertainment
August 15, 2014	The Expendables 3	North American, U.K. and Irish distribution only; co-production with Millennium Films
August 22, 2014	The Prince	co-distribution with Grindstone Entertainment Group only
August 29, 2014	Leprechaun: Origins	
August 29, 2014	Life of Crime	North American co-distribution with Roadside Attractions only
September 19, 2014	Reclaim	North American co-distribution with Grindstone Entertainment Group only
October 7, 2014	Alpha and Omega: The Legend of the Saw Tooth Cave	Direct-to-video; co-production with Crest Animation Productions
October 10, 2014	Addicted	
October 24, 2014	John Wick	distribution under Summit Entertainment only; produced by Thunder Road Films and 87Eleven Productions
October 24, 2014	Exists	
November 7, 2014	Jessabelle	co-production with Blumhouse Productions
November 21, 2014	The Hunger Games: Mockingjay – Part 1	co-production with Color Force; film adaptation of book of the same name
December 5, 2014	Dying of the Light	North American co-distribution with Grindstone Entertainment Group only
January 16, 2015	Spare Parts	distribution only; produced by Pantelion Films
January 16, 2015	Vice	U.S. co-distribution with Grindstone Entertainment Group only
January 23, 2015	Mortdecai	co-production with OddLot Entertainment, Infinitum Nihil and Mad Chance Productions
January 30, 2015	Wild Card	U.S. distribution only
February 6, 2015	The Voices	
February 20, 2015	The Duff	North American distribution only; produced by CBS Films, Wonderland Sound and Vision and Vast Entertainment
March 13, 2015	Cymbeline	North American co-distribution with Grindstone Entertainment Group only
March 20, 2015	The Divergent Series: Insurgent	distribution only; produced by Summit Entertainment, Red Wagon Entertainment and Mandeville Films
March 27, 2015	Nightlight	
April 3, 2015	Last Knights	North American co-distribution with Grindstone Entertainment Group only
April 17, 2015	Child 44	distribution only; produced by Summit Entertainment, Worldview Entertainment and Scott Free Productions
April 24, 2015	The Age of Adaline	North American distribution only; co-production with Sidney Kimmel Entertainment and Lakeshore Entertainment
May 15, 2015	Absolution	U.S. co-distribution with Grindstone Entertainment Group only
May 29, 2015	Survivor	
June 12, 2015	Vendetta	
July 10, 2015	What We Did on Our Holiday	
July 24, 2015	Smosh: The Movie	international distribution only, produced by Defy Media and AwesomenessTV
July 24, 2015	The Vatican Tapes	distribution only; produced by Pantelion Films
August 5, 2015	Shaun The Sheep Movie	North American distribution only; produced by Aardman Animations, and StudioCanal
August 14, 2015	Brothers	studio credit only; co-production with Fox Star Studios, Endemol India and Dharma Productions
August 21, 2015	American Ultra	U.S. distribution only; co-production with PalmStar Media Capital, FilmNation Entertainment, Likely Story, PalmStar Entertainment, Circle of Confusion, Merced Media Partners, Tadmor Entertainment and The Bridge Finance Company
September 4, 2015	Un gallo con muchos huevos	U.S. distribution only; produced by Pantelion Films and Huevocartoon Producciones
September 11, 2015	12 Rounds 3: Lockdown	limited release; produced by WWE Studios
September 18, 2015	Sicario	distribution only; produced by Black Label Media and Thunder Road Films
October 1, 2015	The Warrior	distribution only; produced by Central Partnership, Art Pictures Studio, and All-Russia State Television and Radio Broadcasting Company (VGTRK)
October 2, 2015	Freeheld	North American distribution under Summit Entertainment only; produced by Endgame Entertainment
October 23, 2015	The Last Witch Hunter	distribution only; produced by Summit Entertainment, One Race Films and Mark Canton Productions
November 6, 2015	The Condemned 2	co-distribution with WWE Films
November 13, 2015	Heist	co-distribution with Grindstone Entertainment Group only
November 13, 2015	Love the Coopers	distribution only; produced by CBS Films, Imagine Entertainment and Groundswell Productions
November 20, 2015	The Hunger Games: Mockingjay – Part 2	co-production with Color Force
December 25, 2015	Point Break	international distribution outside the U.K., Ireland, Latin America, Japan, the CIS and China under Summit Entertainment only; produced by DMG Entertainment, Alcon Entertainment, Erman Productions and Studio Babelsberg
January 15, 2016	Norm of the North	co-production with Splash Entertainment, Assemblage Entertainment and Telegael
January 22, 2016	Dirty Grandpa	U.S., U.K. and Irish distribution only; produced by BillBlock Media, QED International and Josephson Entertainment
February 5, 2016	The Choice	co-production with Nicholas Sparks Productions and The Safran Company
February 26, 2016	Gods of Egypt	distribution only; produced by Summit Entertainment, Thunder Road Films and Mystery Clock Cinema
March 11, 2016	The Perfect Match	co-production with CodeBlack Films, Jorva Entertainment Productions and Flavor Unit Entertainment
March 18, 2016	The Divergent Series: Allegiant	distribution only; produced by Summit Entertainment, Red Wagon Entertainment, and Mandeville Films
March 28, 2016	Eddie the Eagle	U.K. and Irish distribution only; produced by Marv, Saville Productions and Studio Babelsberg; distributed elsewhere by 20th Century Fox
April 15, 2016	Criminal	U.S., U.K. and Irish distribution under Summit Entertainment only; produced by Millennium Films, BenderSpink and Campbell Grobman Films
April 22, 2016	A Hologram for the King	U.S. co-distribution with Roadside Attractions and Saban Films only; produced by Lotus Entertainment
May 10, 2016	Alpha and Omega: Dino Digs	Direct-to-video; co-production with Splash Entertainment
June 10, 2016	Now You See Me 2	distribution only; produced by Summit Entertainment and K/O Paper Products
July 15, 2016	Café Society	North American co-distribution with Amazon Studios only; produced by Gravier Productions and Perdido Productions
July 27, 2016	Nerve	co-production with Allison Shearmur Productions and Keep Your Head Productions
August 12, 2016	Hell or High Water	North American co-distribution with CBS Films only; produced by Sidney Kimmel Entertainment, OddLot Entertainment, Film 44 and LBI Entertainment
August 26, 2016	Mechanic: Resurrection	U.S., U.K. and Irish distribution under Summit Premiere only; produced by Millennium Films, Chartoff Productions and Winkler Films
September 2, 2016	The 9th Life of Louis Drax	North American distribution under Summit Premiere only; produced by Miramax, Brightlight Pictures and Fire Axe Pictures
September 16, 2016	Blair Witch	co-production with Vertigo Entertainment, Room 101 and Snoot Entertainment
September 16, 2016	Operation Avalanche	
September 16, 2016	Pawn Sacrifice	international distribution only; produced by Material Pictures, Gail Katz Productions, MICA Entertainment and PalmStar Media
September 30, 2016	Deepwater Horizon	distribution only; produced by Summit Entertainment, Participant Media and Di Bonaventura Pictures
October 7, 2016	Middle School: The Worst Years of My Life	North American distribution only; produced by CBS Films, James Patterson Entertainment and Participant Media
October 13, 2016	A Monster Calls	international distribution outside Spain only; produced by Participant Media, River Road Entertainment, Apaches Entertainment and Peliculas La Trini
October 14, 2016	La Leyenda del Chupacabras	U.S. distribution only; produced by Pantelion Films and Ánima Estudios
October 21, 2016	American Pastoral	U.S. distribution only; co-production with Lakeshore Entertainment
October 21, 2016	Boo! A Madea Halloween	co-production with Tyler Perry Studios
November 4, 2016	Hacksaw Ridge	U.S., U.K. and Irish distribution under Summit Entertainment only; produced by AI Film, IM Global, Permut Presentations and Cross Creek Pictures
November 8, 2016	Alpha and Omega: The Big Fureeze	Direct-to-video; co-production with Splash Entertainment
December 9, 2016	La La Land	distribution only; produced by Summit Entertainment, Marc Platt Productions and Black Label Media
December 21, 2016	Patriots Day	co-production with CBS Films, Closest to the Hole Productions, Leverage Entertainment, Bluegrass Films and Hutch Parker Entertainment
January 11, 2017	The Last Face	international distribution only; produced by River Road Entertainment, Filmhaven Entertainment, Gerber Pictures and Matt Palmieri Productions
February 10, 2017	John Wick: Chapter 2	distribution only; produced by Summit Entertainment, Thunder Road Films and 87Eleven Productions
February 24, 2017	Rock Dog	distribution only; produced by Summit Entertainment and Huayi Brothers
March 3, 2017	The Shack	distribution only; produced by Summit Entertainment, Gil Netter Productions and Windblown Media
March 10, 2017	The Sense of an Ending	U.S. co-distribution with CBS Films only; produced by FilmNation Entertainment and BBC Films
March 24, 2017	Power Rangers	co-production with Temple Hill Entertainment
April 7, 2017	Aftermath	North American co-distribution with Grindstone Entertainment Group only
May 9, 2017	Alpha and Omega: Journey To Bear Kingdom	Direct-to-video; co-production with Splash Entertainment
June 16, 2017	All Eyez on Me	U.S., U.K. and Irish distribution only with Summit Entertainment; produced by Morgan Creek Productions, The Program Pictures and Codeblack Films
June 23, 2017	The Big Sick	North American co-distribution with Amazon Studios only; produced by FilmNation Entertainment and Apatow Productions
August 11, 2017	The Glass Castle	co-production with Gil Netter Productions
August 18, 2017	The Hitman's Bodyguard	U.S., U.K. and Irish distribution under Summit Entertainment only; produced by Millennium Media, Cristal Pictures and Campbell Grobman Films
September 15, 2017	American Assassin	co-production with CBS Films and Di Bonaventura Pictures
September 22, 2017	Stronger	co-distribution with Roadside Attractions only; produced by Bold Films, Mandeville Films and Nine Stories Productions
October 6, 2017	My Little Pony: The Movie	co-production with Allspark Pictures and DHX Media
October 9, 2017	Human Flow	international distribution only; produced by Participant Media and AC Films
October 20, 2017	Boo 2! A Madea Halloween	co-production with Tyler Perry Studios
October 20, 2017	Leatherface	U.S., U.K. and Irish distribution only; produced by Millennium Films and Campbell Grobman Films
October 20, 2017	Where's the Money	
October 27, 2017	Jigsaw	co-production with Twisted Pictures
November 1, 2017	Based on a True Story	international distribution outside France and Belgium only
November 3, 2017	Last Flag Flying	North American co-distribution with Amazon Studios only; produced by Detour Filmproduction and Cinetic Media
November 17, 2017	Wonder	co-production with Walden Media, Participant Media and Mandeville Films
January 12, 2018	Acts of Violence	North American co-distribution with Grindstone Entertainment Group only
January 12, 2018	The Commuter	U.S. distribution only; produced by StudioCanal, TF1 Films Production, The Picture Company and Ombra Films
January 19, 2018	12 Strong	international distribution only; produced by Alcon Entertainment, Torridon Films, Jerry Bruckheimer Films and Black Label Media; distributed in North America by Warner Bros. Pictures
February 2, 2018	Winchester	U.S., U.K. and Irish distribution with CBS Films only; produced by Blacklab Entertainment and Imagination Design Works
March 15, 2018	Entebbe	international distribution outside the U.K., Ireland, Australia, New Zealand, the Benelux, Spain, Scandinavia, Israel, India, Pakistan, China, Korea, Vietnam and Indonesia only; produced by Participant Media and Working Title Films
March 18, 2018	Children of the Corn: Runaway	distribution only; produced by Dimension Films
March 30, 2018	Acrimony	co-production with Tyler Perry Studios
April 20, 2018	Traffik	distribution only; produced by Summit Entertainment and CodeBlack Films
May 4, 2018	The Con Is On	U.S. co-distribution with Grindstone Entertainment Group only
June 7, 2018	Hotel Artemis	international distribution only; produced by Marc Platt Productions, the Ink Factory and 127 Wall
June 15, 2018	Affairs of State	U.S. co-distribution with Grindstone Entertainment Group only
June 29, 2018	Sicario: Day of the Soldado	international distribution outside Latin America, South Africa and Spain only; produced by Black Label Media and Thunder Road Films; distributed in North and Latin America, South Africa and Spain by Columbia Pictures through Sony Pictures Releasing
June 29, 2018	Uncle Drew	distribution only; produced by Summit Entertainment and Temple Hill Entertainment
July 20, 2018	Blindspotting	distribution under Summit Entertainment and CodeBlack Films only
August 3, 2018	The Spy Who Dumped Me	co-production with Imagine Entertainment
August 17, 2018	Down a Dark Hall	distribution under Summit Entertainment only; produced by Temple Hill Entertainment
August 31, 2018	Kin	distribution under Summit Entertainment only; produced by 21 Laps Entertainment and Good Universe
September 14, 2018	A Simple Favor	co-production with Bron Studios, Hercules Film Fund, Creative Wealth Media Finance and Feigco Entertainment
September 21, 2018	Little Italy	U.S. co-distribution with Grindstone Entertainment Group only
September 28, 2018	Hell Fest	distribution only; produced by CBS Films, Tucker Tooley Entertainment and Valhalla Motion Pictures
October 12, 2018	I Still See You	
October 26, 2018	Air Strike	North American co-distribution with Grindstone Entertainment Group only
October 26, 2018	Hunter Killer	U.S., U.K. and Irish distribution under Summit Premiere only; produced by Millennium Media, Original Film, G-Base and Relativity Media
November 9, 2018	Time Freak	U.S. co-distribution with Grindstone Entertainment Group only
November 21, 2018	Robin Hood	distribution only; produced by Summit Entertainment, Appian Way Productions, Thunder Road Films and Safehouse Pictures
November 30, 2018	Green Book	international distribution outside the U.K., Ireland, Australia, New Zealand, the Benelux, Spain, Scandinavia, Israel, India, Pakistan, China, Korea, Vietnam and Indonesia only; produced by Participant Media, DreamWorks Pictures, Innisfree Pictures and Cinetic Media
December 7, 2018	Ben Is Back	North American co-distribution with LD Entertainment and Roadside Attractions only
December 14, 2018	Backtrace	North American co-distribution with Grindstone Entertainment Group only
December 28, 2018	On the Basis of Sex	international distribution outside the U.K., Ireland, Australia, New Zealand, the Benelux, Spain, Scandinavia, Israel, India, Pakistan, China, Korea, Vietnam and Indonesia only; produced by Participant Media, Alibaba Pictures and Robert Cort Productions
January 11, 2019	Norm of the North: Keys to the Kingdom	Direct-to-video; co-production with Splash Entertainment and Assemblage Entertainment
January 18, 2019	The Last Man	U.S. co-distribution with Grindstone Entertainment Group only
February 8, 2019	Cold Pursuit	U.S. distribution under Summit Entertainment only; produced by StudioCanal, MAS Production and Paradox Films
March 1, 2019	A Madea Family Funeral	co-production with Tyler Perry Studios
March 1, 2019	We Die Young	North American co-distribution with Grindstone Entertainment Group only
March 8, 2019	The Kid	distribution only; produced by Mimran Schur Pictures
March 14, 2019	Captive State	international distribution outside the U.K., Ireland, Australia, New Zealand, the Benelux, Spain, Scandinavia, Israel, India, Pakistan, China, Korea, Vietnam and Indonesia only; produced by Participant Media and Lightfuse & Getaway
March 15, 2019	Five Feet Apart	North American distribution only; produced by CBS Films, Welle Entertainment and Wayfarer Studios
March 22, 2019	Dragged Across Concrete	U.S. distribution under Summit Entertainment only; produced by Unified Pictures, Assemble Media, Cinestate, Endeavor Content, Look to the Sky Films, and Moot Point Productions
April 12, 2019	Crypto	U.S. co-distribution with Grindstone Entertainment Group only
April 12, 2019	Hellboy	U.S., U.K. and Irish distribution under Summit Entertainment only; produced by Millennium Media, Lawrence Gordon/Lloyd Levin Productions, Dark Horse Entertainment, Nu Boyana and Campbell Grobman Films
May 3, 2019	Long Shot	distribution only; produced by Summit Entertainment, Good Universe, Point Grey Pictures and Denver and Delilah Productions
May 17, 2019	John Wick: Chapter 3 – Parabellum	distribution only; produced by Summit Entertainment, Thunder Road Films and 87Eleven Productions
May 24, 2019	The Poison Rose	North American co-distribution with Grindstone Entertainment Group only
June 11, 2019	Norm of the North: King Sized Adventure	Direct-to-video; co-production with Splash Entertainment and Assemblage Entertainment
June 21, 2019	Anna	distribution outside France under Summit Entertainment only; produced by EuropaCorp and TF1 Films Production
June 26, 2019	Step Up: Year of the Dance	distribution only; produced by Yue Hua Pictures
June 28, 2019	Killers Anonymous	U.S. co-distribution with Grindstone Entertainment Group only
July 5, 2019	My Days of Mercy	
August 9, 2019	Scary Stories to Tell in the Dark	U.S. distribution only; produced by CBS Films, Entertainment One and DDY
August 23, 2019	Angel Has Fallen	U.S., U.K. and Irish distribution only; produced by Millennium Media and G-BASE
August 30, 2019	Angel of Mine	North American co-distribution with Grindstone Entertainment Group only
September 6, 2019	Strange but True	co-production with CBS Films, Bankside Films, Head Gear Films, Automatik, Motion Picture Capital and First Generation Films
September 13, 2019	The Weekend	U.S. co-distribution with Grindstone Entertainment Group only
September 16, 2019	3 from Hell	co-production with Saban Films
September 20, 2019	Rambo: Last Blood	U.S., U.K. and Irish distribution only; produced by Balboa Productions, Dadi Film (HK) Ltd., Millennium Media, Templeton Media and Campbell Grobman Films
October 2, 2019	Aquarela	international distribution outside Latin America, Australia, New Zealand, Scandinavia, South Africa and India only; produced by Participant Media, Louverture Films, Ma.Ja.De Film, Aconite and Danish Documentary
October 11, 2019	Jexi	U.S. distribution only; produced by CBS Films, Entertainment One and Team Todd
October 11, 2019	Lucky Day	U.S. co-distribution with Grindstone Entertainment Group only
October 25, 2019	The Gallows Act II	distribution only; produced by Blumhouse Productions, Entertainment 360 and Tremendum Pictures
November 8, 2019	Midway	U.S., U.K. and Irish distribution excluding airlines with Summit Entertainment only; produced by Ruyi Films, Starlight Culture Entertainment, Centropolis Entertainment, Bona Film Group, Street Entertainment, Entertainment One and AGC Studios
November 15, 2019	The Turkey Bowl	
November 22, 2019	The Courier	North American co-distribution with Grindstone Entertainment Group only
November 27, 2019	Dark Waters	international distribution outside the U.K., Ireland, Australia, New Zealand, the Benelux, Spain, Scandinavia, Israel, India, Pakistan, China, Korea, Vietnam and Indonesia only; produced by Participant and Killer Films
November 27, 2019	Knives Out	distribution only; produced by MRC and T-Street Productions
December 13, 2019	Bombshell	distribution only; produced by Creative Wealth Media, Annapurna Pictures, Bron Studios, Denver and Delilah Productions, Gramsci and Lighthouse Management & Media
December 13, 2019	Hell on the Border	co-distribution with Grindstone Entertainment Group only
