= List of Roadside Attractions films =

This is a list of films and television series distributed or produced by Roadside Attractions, the independent motion picture production/distribution arm of Lionsgate Studios.

== Released ==
=== 2000s ===
Release date	Title	Notes	Ref(s)
July 23, 1999	Trick	co-production with Good Machine; under Eric d'Arbeloff's Roadside Attractions banner	
August 2, 2002	Lovely & Amazing	co-production with Good Machine; under Eric d'Arbeloff's Roadside Attractions banner	
July 3, 2003	Lifetime Guarantee: Phranc's Adventures in Plastic	Produced	
May 7, 2004	Super Size Me	U.S. theatrical and home video co-distribution with Samuel Goldwyn Films only	
June 18, 2004	What the Bleep Do We Know!?	U.S. co-distribution with Samuel Goldwyn Films only	
September 3, 2004	Remember Me, My Love	North American distribution only	
October 1, 2004	Tying the Knot	North American distribution only	
April 29, 2005	Ladies in Lavender	U.S. distribution only	
August 12, 2005	Pretty Persuasion	North American co-distribution with Samuel Goldwyn Films only	
November 11, 2005	Sarah Silverman: Jesus is Magic	U.S. theatrical and television distribution only	
December 16, 2005	Lassie	U.S. theatrical co-distribution with Samuel Goldwyn Films under IDP Distribution only	
February 3, 2006	What the Bleep!?: Down the Rabbit Hole	U.S. co-distribution with Samuel Goldwyn Films only	
May 12, 2006	Wah-Wah	North American co-distribution with Samuel Goldwyn Films only	
June 2, 2006	The Puffy Chair	U.S. co-distribution with Netflix's Red Envelope Entertainment only	
June 23, 2006	The Road to Guantánamo	North American distribution only	
August 4, 2006	Boynton Beach Club	North American co-distribution with Samuel Goldwyn Films only	
November 10, 2006	Come Early Morning	U.S. distribution only	
February 23, 2007	Amazing Grace	U.S. co-distribution with Samuel Goldwyn Films only	
April 13, 2007	Lonely Hearts	U.S. theatrical co-distribution with Samuel Goldwyn Films only	
June 22, 2007	Colma: The Musical	distribution only	
August 24, 2007	Right at Your Door	U.S. distribution only	
September 21, 2007	Sleeping Dogs Lie	U.S. co-distribution with Samuel Goldwyn Films only	
September 28, 2007	Trade	U.S. co-distribution with Lionsgate only	
October 26, 2007	Bella	U.S. co-distribution with Lionsgate only	
October 26, 2007	How To Cook Your Life	North American distribution only	
November 23, 2007	Starting Out in the Evening	distribution only	
January 18, 2008	Teeth	U.S. distribution only	
February 1, 2008	Caramel	U.S. distribution only	
February 29, 2008	Chicago 10	U.S. distribution only	
May 9, 2008	Before the Rains	U.S. distribution only	
May 30, 2008	The Fall	U.S. distribution only	
July 11, 2008	Garden Party	U.S. distribution only	
July 25, 2008	CSNY/Déjà Vu	U.S. theatrical distribution; Roadside and Lionsgate jointly handled VOD	
August 8, 2008	Beer for My Horses	distribution only; international and ancillary rights licensed to Lionsgate	
August 22, 2008	I.O.U.S.A.	U.S. distribution only	
September 5, 2008	Everybody Wants to Be Italian	U.S. distribution only	
September 26, 2008	The Lucky Ones	U.S. co-distribution with Lionsgate only	
November 7, 2008	House	U.S. distribution only	
March 20, 2009	Super Capers	U.S. distribution only	
March 27, 2009	Goodbye Solo	U.S. distribution only	
April 3, 2009	Alien Trespass	U.S. distribution only	
April 17, 2009	The Golden Boys	U.S. distribution only	
May 1, 2009	Battle for Terra	U.S. co-distribution with Lionsgate only	
June 26, 2009	The Stoning of Soraya M.	U.S. co-distribution with Mpower Pictures only	
July 24, 2009	Shrink	U.S. distribution only	
July 31, 2009	The Cove	U.S. co-distribution with Lionsgate and Participant Media only	
August 28, 2009	Mystery Team	U.S. distribution only	
September 11, 2009	The September Issue	North American theatrical and home media distribution only	
October 9, 2009	From Mexico with Love	U.S. distribution only	
October 9, 2009	Good Hair	co-distribution excluding pay cable television with LD Entertainment only	

=== 2010s ===
Release date	Title	Notes	Ref(s)
February 18, 2010	The Good Guy	distribution only	
February 19, 2010	Happy Tears	U.S. distribution only; Lionsgate handled home media	
March 26, 2010	Ca$h	U.S. distribution only; Lionsgate handled home media	
April 16, 2010	The Joneses	U.S. theatrical distribution only	
May 14, 2010	Princess Kaiulani	U.S. distribution only; Lionsgate handled home media	
June 11, 2010	Winter's Bone	U.S. distribution only; partner Maple Pictures in Canada	
November 12, 2010	Cool It	U.S. distribution only	
December 3, 2010	I Love You Phillip Morris	North American co-distribution with LD Entertainment only	
December 10, 2010	The Garden of Eden	U.S. distribution only	
December 29, 2010	Biutiful	U.S. distribution only	
February 18, 2011	Immigration Tango	U.S. distribution only	
March 18, 2011	The Music Never Stopped	U.S. theatrical distribution only	
April 1, 2011	The Last Godfather	North American distribution only	
April 15, 2011	The Conspirator	U.S. co-distribution with Lionsgate only	
May 13, 2011	Everything Must Go	U.S. co-distribution with Lionsgate only	
July 8, 2011	Project Nim	U.S. distribution only	
July 29, 2011	The Future	North American distribution only	
August 26, 2011	Circumstance	U.S. distribution only	
September 23, 2011	Thunder Soul	North American distribution only	
October 21, 2011	Margin Call	U.S. co-distribution with Lionsgate only	
December 2, 2011	Answers to Nothing	U.S. distribution only	
January 27, 2012	Albert Nobbs	U.S. co-distribution with LD Entertainment only	
March 9, 2012	Friends with Kids	U.S. co-distribution with Lionsgate only	
April 13, 2012	Blue Like Jazz	U.S. distribution only	
May 11, 2012	Tonight You're Mine	U.S. co-distribution with Stage 6 Films only	
June 1, 2012	30 Beats	U.S. and Latin American distribution only	
August 3, 2012	Soldiers of Fortune	U.S. distribution only	
September 7, 2012	Branded	North American distribution only; Lionsgate handled home media	
September 14, 2012	Arbitrage	U.S. co-distribution with Lionsgate only	
October 5, 2012	Escape Fire: The Fight to Rescue American Healthcare	U.S. distribution only	
November 2, 2012	The Bay	U.S. distribution only	
March 8, 2013	Emperor	U.S. distribution only; Lionsgate handled home media	
April 26, 2013	Mud	U.S. co-distribution with Lionsgate	
May 17, 2013	Stories We Tell	U.S. distribution only	
June 21, 2013	Much Ado About Nothing	North American co-distribution with Lionsgate only	
June 28, 2013	Redemption	U.S. co-distribution with Lionsgate only	
July 19, 2013	Girl Most Likely	U.S. co-distribution with Lionsgate only	
August 9, 2013	In a World...	U.S. distribution only; Stage 6 Films handled other territories	
September 20, 2013	Thanks for Sharing	U.S. co-distribution with Lionsgate only	
October 4, 2013	Grace Unplugged	U.S. co-distribution with Lionsgate only	
October 25, 2013	All Is Lost	U.S. co-distribution with Lionsgate only	
January 24, 2014	Gimme Shelter	U.S. distribution only	
January 24, 2014	Gloria	U.S. distribution only	
February 21, 2014	Barefoot	U.S. distribution only	
February 21, 2014	In Secret	U.S. distribution only	
March 21, 2014	Blood Ties	U.S. co-distribution with Lionsgate only	
April 11, 2014	Joe	U.S. distribution only; Lionsgate handled home media	
May 23, 2014	Word and Pictures	U.S. distribution only	
August 1, 2014	A Most Wanted Man	U.S. co-distribution with Lionsgate only	
August 29, 2014	Life of Crime	U.S. co-distribution with Lionsgate only	
September 12, 2014	The Skeleton Twins	U.S. co-distribution with Lionsgate only; Sony Pictures Releasing International and Stage 6 Films handled other territories	
October 10, 2014	The Devil's Hand	U.S. co-distribution with LD Entertainment only	
October 17, 2014	Dear White People	North American co-distribution with Lionsgate only	
November 14, 2014	The Homesman	North American co-distribution with Saban Films only	
January 23, 2015	Mommy	U.S. distribution only	
February 27, 2015	'71	U.S. co-distribution with Black Label Media only	
April 17, 2015	Beyond the Reach	U.S. co-distribution with Lionsgate only	
May 8, 2015	Maggie	U.S. co-distribution with Lionsgate only	
May 15, 2015	Where Hope Grows	North American distribution only	
June 5, 2015	Love and Mercy	North American co-distribution with Lionsgate only	
July 17, 2015	Mr. Holmes	U.S. co-distribution with Miramax only	
August 21, 2015	Z for Zachariah	U.S. co-distribution with Lionsgate only	
September 25, 2015	Stonewall	U.S. distribution only	
November 6, 2015	Miss You Already	U.S. co-distribution with Lionsgate only	
December 4, 2015	Chi-Raq	U.S. theatrical co-distribution with Lionsgate and Amazon Studios	
February 12, 2016	Touched with Fire	U.S. distribution only	
March 11, 2016	Hello, My Name Is Doris	U.S. co-distribution with Stage 6 Films only	
April 22, 2016	A Hologram for the King	U.S. co-distribution with Lionsgate and Saban Films only	
May 13, 2016	Love & Friendship	U.S. co-distribution with Amazon Studios only	
June 10, 2016	Genius	co-distribution with Lionsgate only	
July 1, 2016	Our Kind of Traitor	U.S. co-distribution with Lionsgate only	
July 29, 2016	Indignation	North American co-distribution with Summit Entertainment only	
August 26, 2016	Southside with You	North American co-distribution with Miramax only	
October 14, 2016	Priceless	U.S. distribution only	
November 18, 2016	Manchester by the Sea	U.S. co-distribution with Amazon Studios only	
February 24, 2017	Bitter Harvest	U.S. distribution only	
April 14, 2017	Tommy's Honour	U.S. distribution only	
May 12, 2017	The Wall	U.S. co-distribution with Amazon Studios only	
May 12, 2017	The Wedding Plan	U.S. distribution only	
June 9, 2017	Beatriz at Dinner	North American, Australian and New Zealand co-distribution with FilmNation Entertainment only	
July 14, 2017	Lady Macbeth	North American distribution only	
August 11, 2017	The Only Living Boy in New York	U.S. co-distribution with Amazon Studios only	
September 22, 2017	Stronger	co-distribution with Lionsgate only	
October 20, 2017	Wonderstruck	U.S. co-distribution with Amazon Studios only	
January 19, 2018	Forever My Girl	U.S. distribution only	
February 16, 2018	The Party	North American distribution only	
March 16, 2018	I Can Only Imagine	co-distribution with Lionsgate only	
March 30, 2018	Finding Your Feet	U.S. co-distribution with Stage 6 Films	
May 11, 2018	Beast	U.S. co-distribution with 30West only	
July 6, 2018	Whitney	U.S. co-distribution with Miramax only	
August 17, 2018	Juliet, Naked	U.S. co-distribution with Lionsgate only	
September 14, 2018	Lizzie	North American co-distribution with Saban Films only	
October 12, 2018	The Oath	North American co-distribution with Topic Studios	
October 26, 2018	Viper Club	U.S. co-distribution with YouTube	
December 7, 2018	Ben Is Back	U.S. co-distribution with Lionsgate and LD Entertainment	
February 22, 2019	Run the Race	U.S. distribution only	
May 17, 2019	Trial by Fire	U.S. distribution only	
June 14, 2019	American Woman	U.S. co-distribution with Vertical Entertainment only	
July 5, 2019	Marianne & Leonard: Words of Love	U.S. distribution only	
August 9, 2019	The Peanut Butter Falcon	U.S. distribution only	
August 23, 2019	Fiddler: A Miracle of Miracles	co-distribution with Samuel Goldwyn Films only	
September 27, 2019	Judy	U.S. co-distribution with LD Entertainment only	
October 18, 2019	Cyrano, My Love	U.S. distribution only	
November 15, 2019	The Warrior Queen of Jhansi	U.S. distribution only	

=== 2020s ===
Release date	Title	Notes	Ref(s)
January 24, 2020	The Last Full Measure	U.S. distribution only	
March 6, 2020	Hope Gap	North American co-distribution with Screen Media Films only	
July 31, 2020	The Secret: Dare to Dream	North American co-distribution with Gravitas Ventures only	
August 21, 2020	Words on Bathroom Walls	U.S. co-distribution with LD Entertainment only	
September 30, 2020	The Glorias	North American co-distribution with LD Entertainment only	
November 13, 2020	The Ride	co-distribution with Amazon Prime Video only	
December 25, 2020	Pinocchio	U.S. distribution only	
March 19, 2021	The Courier	North American co-distribution with Lionsgate only	
May 14, 2021	Finding You	U.S. theatrical distribution only	
June 18, 2021	Rita Moreno: Just a Girl Who Decided to Go for It	North American distribution excluding television only	
July 23, 2021	Joe Bell	U.S. distribution only; Vertical Entertainment handled digital releases	
September 10, 2021	The Alpinist	U.S. theatrical co-distribution with Universal Pictures only	
October 15, 2021	Hard Luck Love Song	U.S. distribution only	
October 29, 2021	Snakehead	North American co-distribution in all media excluding airline distribution with Samuel Goldwyn Films only	
February 25, 2022	The Desperate Hour	North American co-distribution with Vertical Entertainment only	
March 18, 2022	Alice	U.S. co-distribution with Vertical Entertainment only	
April 8, 2022	Aline	U.S. co-distribution with Samuel Goldwyn Films only	
April 29, 2022	Firebird	North American distribution only	
May 13, 2022	Family Camp	U.S. distribution only	
June 3, 2022	Benediction	North American distribution only	
July 1, 2022	The Forgiven	North American co-distribution with Vertical Entertainment only; Focus Features and Universal Pictures handled other territories	
August 12, 2022	Emily the Criminal	North American co-distribution with Vertical Entertainment only; Universal Pictures handled other territories	
September 2, 2022	Gigi & Nate	U.S. distribution only	
September 30, 2022	The Good House	North American co-distribution with Lionsgate only	
October 28, 2022	Call Jane	U.S. distribution only	
December 9, 2022	To The End	U.S. distribution only	
January 19, 2023	The Pod Generation	North American co-distribution with Vertical only	
February 24, 2023	My Happy Ending	North American distribution only	
March 17, 2023	Moving On	U.S. distribution only	
April 21, 2023	Somewhere in Queens	North American co-distribution with Lionsgate only	
May 12, 2023	Fool's Paradise	North American co-distribution with Grindstone Entertainment Group only; Lionsgate handled home media	
June 23, 2023	The Last Rider	North American distribution only	
July 14, 2023	Black Ice	US co-distribution with Grindstone Entertainment Group only	
August 4, 2023	Dreamin' Wild	North American distribution only	
August 4, 2023	Shortcomings	co-production with Topic Studios, Tango, Imminent Collision, and Picture Films; distributed worldwide by Sony Pictures Classics	
August 25, 2023	Retribution	North American and Indian co-distribution with Lionsgate only	
September 15, 2023	Camp Hideout	U.S. distribution only	
October 23, 2023	Beyond Utopia	North American co-distribution with Fathom Events only	
November 3, 2023	The Marsh King's Daughter	North American co-distribution with Lionsgate only	
February 2, 2024	Scrambled	co-distribution with Lionsgate only	
January 19, 2024	Bring Him to Me	U.S. co-distribution with Samuel Goldwyn Films only	
February 9, 2024	The Monk and the Gun	U.S. distribution only	
March 8, 2024	Accidental Texan	North American distribution only	
March 29, 2024	Asphalt City	North American co-distribution with Vertical only	
April 12, 2024	The Absence of Eden	U.S. co-distribution with Vertical only	
April 26, 2024	Boy Kills World	U.S. co-distribution with Lionsgate only	
May 31, 2024	Summer Camp	U.S. distribution only	
June 14, 2024	Firebrand	U.S. co-distribution with Vertical only	
July 4, 2024	Kill	North American, U.K. and Irish co-distribution with Lionsgate only	
August 16, 2024	My Penguin Friend	U.S. distribution only; Lionsgate handled home media	
August 30, 2024	City of Dreams	U.S. distribution only	
September 27, 2024	Lee	U.S. co-distribution with Vertical only	
October 18, 2024	Exhibiting Forgiveness	U.S. distribution only	
November 8, 2024	Small Things Like These	North American co-distribution with Lionsgate only	
December 13, 2024	The Last Showgirl	North American distribution only	
February 28, 2025	Riff Raff	U.S. co-distribution with Grindstone Entertainment Group only	
March 21, 2025	Bob Trevino Likes It	U.S. distribution only	
May 2, 2025	The Surfer	North American co-distribution with Lionsgate only	
June 13, 2025	The Unholy Trinity	North American co-distribution with Saban Films only	
July 25, 2025	The Home	U.S. co-distribution with Lionsgate only	
August 8, 2025	Strange Harvest	North American co-distribution with Saban Films	
September 5, 2025	Twinless	U.S. co-distribution with Lionsgate; Stage 6 Films handled other territories	
October 10, 2025	Kiss of the Spider Woman	North American co-distribution with Lionsgate and LD Entertainment only	
October 29, 2025	Anniversary	North American co-distribution with Lionsgate only	
November 14, 2025	King Ivory	North American co-distribution with Saban Films; Universal Pictures handled other territories	
December 12, 2025	Dust Bunny	North American co-distribution with Lionsgate only	
January 23, 2026	H Is for Hawk	North American distribution only	
March 20, 2026	Tow	U.S. co-distribution with Vertical only	
April 3, 2026	A Great Awakening	North American distribution only	
April 24, 2026	Fuze	North American co-distribution with Saban Films only	
June 26, 2026	Lucky Strike	North American co-distribution with Saban Films only	
August 7, 2026	Cookie Queens	U.S. distribution only	
August 28, 2026	Buddy	North American co-distribution with Saban Films only; Stage 6 Films handled other territories	
October 16, 2026	Crawlers	North American co-distribution with Saban Films only	

== Upcoming films ==
Release date	Title	Notes	Ref(s)
December 4, 2026	The Gallerist	U.S. co-distribution with Vertical only	
February 19, 2027	Babies	U.S. co-distribution with Vertical only	
March 2027	Wind of Change	North American distribution only	
April 30, 2027	One Second After	U.S. distribution only	

== Television ==
=== 2010s ===
Release date	Title	Notes	Ref(s)
2017–2021	Dear White People	produced with Lionsgate Television, SisterLee Productions, Culture Machine, Code Red and Homegrown Pictures	

=== 2020s ===
Release date	Title	Notes	Ref(s)
2020	Professionals	produced with Most Media, Subotica and Spier Films Production	
