= List of Summit Entertainment films =

This is a list of films either produced, distributed or represented by Summit Entertainment.

== 1990s ==
Release date	Title	Notes
November 10, 1991	Ricochet (Note: Owned by Warner Bros. (via HBO))	international distribution only; produced by HBO, Cinema Plus, Indigo Productions and Silver Pictures
February 7, 1992	Medicine Man (Note: Disney has since reclaimed international rights to this film under its Hollywood Pictures banner)	select international distribution only; produced by Cinergi Pictures
May 22, 1993	Hear No Evil	international distribution only
October 28, 1993	The House of the Spirits	international distribution outside German-speaking territories only; produced by Constantin Film and Spring Creek Productions
January 20, 1994	Tombstone	select international distribution only; produced by Cinergi Pictures
February 4, 1994	The Crow (Note: Owned by Paramount Pictures (via Miramax))	international distribution only; produced by Entertainment Media Investment Corporation, Pressman Film and Jeff Most Productions
July 14, 1994	Renaissance Man (Note: Disney has since reclaimed international rights to this film under its Touchstone Pictures banner)	select international distribution only; produced by Cinergi Pictures
September 9, 1994	Color of Night	select international distribution only; produced by Cinergi Pictures
May 25, 1995	Die Hard with a Vengeance (Note: Disney has since reclaimed international rights to this film under its 20th Century Studios banner)	international distribution outside Latin America, the U.K., Ireland, French-speaking Europe and Africa, Germany, Austria, Switzerland, the Benelux, the Nordics, Hungary, Portugal, Spain, Greece, Cyprus, Japan and Taiwan only; produced by Cinergi Pictures and 20th Century Fox
July 15, 1995	Judge Dredd	select international distribution only; produced by Cinergi Pictures and Edward R. Pressman Productions
August 3, 1995	Living in Oblivion	international distribution only; produced by JDI Productions and Lemon Sky Productions
November 9, 1995	The Star Maker	international distribution outside Italy only; produced by RAI and the Cecchi Gori Group
November 17, 1995	The Scarlet Letter	select international distribution only; produced by Cinergi Pictures, Lightmotive, Allied Stars and Moving Pictures
February 17, 1996	Nixon	select international distribution only; produced by Cinergi Pictures and Illusion Entertainment
April 4, 1996	Up Close & Personal	select international distribution only; produced by Cinergi Pictures and Avnet/Kerner Productions
October 3, 1996	The Fan	select international distribution only; produced by Mandalay Entertainment, Scott Free Productions and Wendy Finerman Productions
October 4, 1996	Bound	international distribution only; produced by Dino De Laurentiis Company
October 25, 1996	Twelfth Night: Or What You Will	international distribution only; produced by BBC Films and Renaissance Films
December 19, 1996	Evita	select international distribution only; produced by Cinergi Pictures and Dirty Hands
February 28, 1997	Donnie Brasco	select international distribution only; produced by Mandalay Entertainment, Baltimore Pictures and Mark Johnson Productions
February 27, 1997	Smilla's Sense of Snow	international distribution outside the U.K., Ireland, Australia, New Zealand and German-speaking territories only; produced by Constantin Film
May 8, 1997	Shadow Conspiracy	select international distribution only; produced by Cinergi Pictures
October 17, 1997	I Know What You Did Last Summer	select international distribution only; produced by Mandalay Entertainment and Original Film
October 24, 1997	'Til There Was You	select international distribution only; produced by Lakeshore Entertainment
November 17, 1997	Seven Years in Tibet	select international distribution only; produced by Mandalay Entertainment, Reperage Productions, Vanguard Films and Applecross Productions
December 19, 1997	Open Your Eyes	international distribution outside Spain, France and Italy only
January 30, 1998	Desperate Measures	select international distribution only; produced by Mandalay Entertainment and Eaglepoint Productions
February 12, 1998	Affliction	international distribution only; produced by Largo Entertainment, Reisman Productions and Kingsgate Films
March 20, 1998	Wild Things	select international distribution only; produced by Mandalay Entertainment
April 3, 1998	Deep Rising	select international distribution only; produced by Cinergi Pictures and Calimari Productions
April 15, 1998	John Carpenter's Vampires	international distribution outside Latin America, the U.K., Ireland, the Nordics, Spain and the Benelux only; produced by Largo Entertainment, JVC, Film Office, Spooky Tooth Productions and Storm King Productions
May 1, 1998	Les Miserables	select international distribution only; produced by Mandalay Entertainment, Sarah Radclyffe Productions and James Gorman Productions
May 8, 1998	An Alan Smithee Film: Burn Hollywood Burn	select international distribution only; produced by Cinergi Pictures
May 22, 1998	Fear and Loathing in Las Vegas (Note: Universal has since reclaimed international rights to this film)	international distribution outside the U.K., Ireland and Scandinavia only; produced by Rhino Films
August 21, 1998	Dance with Me	select international distribution only; produced by Mandalay Entertainment and Weissman/Egawa Productions
August 23, 1998	Pi (Note: Currently owned by A24)	international distribution only; produced by Protozoa Pictures, Harvest Film Works, Truth & Soul and Plantain Films
January 22, 1999	Gloria	select international distribution only; produced by Mandalay Entertainment and Eagle Point Productions
January 24, 1999	Kill the Man	international distribution only; produced by Square Dog Pictures
February 5, 1999	The Theory of Flight	international distribution only; produced by Distant Horizon and BBC Films
March 5, 1999	Lock, Stock and Two Smoking Barrels	international distribution only; produced by The Steve Tisch Company and SKA Films
March 12, 1999	The Deep End of the Ocean	select international distribution only; produced by Mandalay Entertainment and Via Rosa Productions
March 12, 1999	Wing Commander	international distribution only; produced by No Prisoners Productions, Digital Anvil, Origin Systems and the Carousel Picture Company
March 31, 1999	The Way We Laughed	distribution outside Italy only; produced by Cecchi Gori Group
May 7, 1999	Buena Vista Social Club	international distribution only; produced by Road Movies Filmproduktion, Kintop Pictures, Arte and Instituto Cubano del Arte e Industria Cinematográficos
May 9, 1999	Payback	Japanese sales only; produced by Icon Productions
May 28, 1999	The Loss of Sexual Innocence	international distribution outside Latin America, the U.K., Ireland, Australia and New Zealand only
July 9, 1999	American Pie	international distribution outside the U.K., Ireland, Australia, New Zealand and South Africa with Newmarket Capital Group only; produced by Universal Pictures and Zide/Perry Productions
July 28, 1999	The Blair Witch Project	international distribution only; produced by Haxan Films
August 25, 1999	The Ninth Gate	international distribution outside France and Spain only; produced by RP Productions
August 26, 1999	Cruel Intentions	German, Austrian, Italian and Spanish distribution only; produced by Newmarket Capital Group and Original Film
September 10, 1999	Grey Owl	international distribution only; produced by Largo Entertainment and Allied Filmmakers
September 17, 1999	Breakfast of Champions	international distribution only; produced by Flying Heart Films
September 17, 1999	Splendor	distribution only
November 6, 1999	Analyze This	Japanese sales only; produced by Warner Bros., Village Roadshow Pictures, NPV Entertainment, Baltimore Pictures, Spring Creek Pictures, Tribeca Productions and Face Productions
November 19, 1999	Sleepy Hollow	select international distribution only; produced by Mandalay Pictures, Scott Rudin Productions and American Zoetrope

== 2000s ==
Release date	Title	Notes
March 3, 2000	The Skulls	international distribution outside the U.K., Ireland and select Asian territories including Japan only; produced by Original Film and Newmarket Capital Group
May 27, 2000	Any Given Sunday	Japanese sales only; produced by Warner Bros. Pictures, Ixtlan and The Donners' Company
August 30, 2000	Nurse Betty	international distribution only; produced by Intermedia, Pacifica Film, Propaganda Films and ab'-strakt pictures
October 19, 2000	The Dish	international distribution outside South Africa only; produced by Distant Horizon
October 27, 2000	Book of Shadows: Blair Witch 2	international distribution only; produced by Artisan Entertainment and Haxan Films
November 17, 2000	Chuck & Buck	international distribution only; produced by Artisan Entertainment, Blow Up Pictures and Flan de Coco Films
December 15, 2000	Requiem for a Dream	international distribution only; produced by Artisan Entertainment, Protozoa Pictures and Thousand Words
March 16, 2001	Enemy at the Gates	select international distribution only; produced by Mandalay Pictures and Reperage Films
March 16, 2001	Memento	co-production with Newmarket Films; Inducted into the National Film Registry in 2017
April 1, 2001	The Mexican	German, Austrian, Spanish and Japanese distribution only; produced by DreamWorks Pictures and Newmarket Films
April 26, 2001	Panic	international distribution only; produced by The Vault and Mad Chance Productions
July 13, 2001	The Score	select international distribution only; produced by Mandalay Pictures and Horseshoe Bay Productions
October 18, 2001	Made	international distribution only; produced by Artisan Entertainment and Resnick Interactive Development
November 23, 2001	Novocaine	international distribution only; produced by Artisan Entertainment
December 5, 2001	The Affair of the Necklace	international distribution outside Latin America, the U.K., Ireland, Australia, New Zealand, France and Italy only; produced by Alcon Entertainment
December 14, 2001	Vanilla Sky	studio credit only; co-production with Paramount Pictures, Cruise/Wagner Productions and Artisan Entertainment
January 13, 2002	Stark Raving Mad	direct-to-video; co-production with Newmarket Films; distributed by Sony Pictures Home Entertainment
February 15, 2002	Crossroads	international distribution only; produced by Zomba Films; rights currently owned by Sony Music Entertainment and RCA Records
May 24, 2002	Insomnia	international distribution outside France, Germany and Austria only; produced by Alcon Entertainment
August 23, 2002	Serving Sara	select international distribution only; produced by Mandalay Pictures, Illusion Productions and Halsted Pictures
November 6, 2002	Femme Fatale	international distribution outside the U.K., Ireland, Australia, New Zealand and Scandinavia only; produced by Quinta Communications and Epsilon Motion Pictures
February 27, 2003	Swimming Upstream	select international distribution only; produced by Crusader Entertainment, Upstream Productions and Pacific Film and Television
April 11, 2003	Holes	select international distribution only; produced by Walt Disney Pictures, Walden Media, Phoenix Pictures and Chicago Pacific Entertainment
May 30, 2003	Wrong Turn	international distribution outside Germany and Austria only; co-production with Constantin Film, Newmarket Films and Regency Enterprises (uncredited)
September 4, 2003	Ghosts of the Abyss	international distribution outside the U.K. and Ireland only; produced by Walden Media and Earthship Productions
October 24, 2003	Beyond Borders	select international distribution only; produced by Mandalay Pictures and Camelot Pictures
February 27, 2004	The Statement	international distribution outside Australia and New Zealand only
March 12, 2004	Twisted	international distribution outside Latin America, the U.K., Ireland, Australia, New Zealand, Germany, Austria and Taiwan only; produced by Intertainment AG and Kopelson Productions
April 1, 2004	Dirty Dancing: Havana Nights	Turkish and Asian distribution only; produced by Artisan Entertainment, Miramax Films and Lawrence Bender Productions
April 15, 2004	The Punisher	international distribution only; produced by Artisan Entertainment, Marvel Entertainment and Valhalla Motion Pictures
June 16, 2004	Around the World in 80 Days	international distribution only; produced by Walden Media and Mostow/Liberman Productions
September 10, 2004	Resident Evil: Apocalypse	international distribution outside Latin America, the U.K., Ireland, Australia, New Zealand, South Africa, France, Germany, Austria, Switzerland, Italy, Spain, Scandinavia, Portugal, India, Pakistan and Japan only; produced by Constantin Film, Davis Films, Impact Pictures and Capcom
October 28, 2004	Being Julia	international distribution outside the U.K., Ireland, Australia, New Zealand and South Africa only; produced by Myriad Pictures, Serendipity Point Films, First Choice Films and Hogarth Productions
November 24, 2004	Alexander	international distribution outside Latin America, the U.K., Ireland, Australia, New Zealand and Italy only; produced by Intermedia Films, IMF Productions and Moritz Borman Productions
January 14, 2005	Racing Stripes	international distribution only; produced by Alcon Entertainment
March 11, 2005	Dot the I	co-production with Arcane Pictures
April 1, 2005	The Jacket	international distribution outside the U.K., Ireland and the Philippines only; produced by Mandalay Pictures, 2929 Entertainment and Section Eight Productions
April 8, 2005	Sahara	international distribution outside the U.K., Ireland, Australia, New Zealand, Italy and Spain only; produced by Bristol Bay Productions, Walden Media, Baldwin Entertainment Group and Kanzaman Productions
April 21, 2005	Inside Deep Throat	international distribution only; produced by HBO Documentary Films, World of Wonder and Imagine Entertainment
April 22, 2005	A Lot like Love	French, Italian and Japanese distribution only; produced by Beacon Pictures
June 7, 2005	Mr. & Mrs. Smith	select international distribution only; co-production with Regency Enterprises, New Regency Productions and Weed Road Pictures
September 22, 2005	Down in the Valley	international distribution only; produced by Element Films
September 23, 2005	Oliver Twist	international distribution outside Latin America only; produced by RP Productions, Runteam Ltd. and Etic Films
October 14, 2005	Domino	international distribution outside France only; produced by Davis Films and Scott Free Productions
November 10, 2005	Where the Truth Lies	international distribution only; produced by Serendipity Point Films
January 6, 2006	Grandma's Boy	international distribution outside the U.K., Ireland, France and Italy only; produced by Level 1 Entertainment and Happy Madison Productions
May 23, 2006	Babel	international distribution outside Latin America, the U.K., Ireland, Australia, New Zealand, South Africa and Spain only; produced by Zeta Film, Central Films and Media Rights Capital
August 11, 2006	Step Up	international distribution outside Spain only; co-production with Touchstone Pictures and Offspring Entertainment
August 18, 2006	Harsh Times	international distribution only; produced by Crave Films
September 7, 2006	DOA: Dead or Alive	international distribution outside Germany, Austria and Switzerland only; produced by Constantin Film, Impact Pictures, Tecmo and Mindfire Entertainment
September 15, 2006	Keeping Mum	co-production with Tusk Productions
November 17, 2006	Lies & Alibis	co-production with Destination Films and Endgame Entertainment
December 27, 2006	Perfume: The Story of a Murderer	international distribution outside France, Germany, Austria, Switzerland and Spain only; produced by Constantin Film, NEF Productions and Castelao Productions
January 5, 2007	Miss Potter	international distribution only; produced by Phoenix Pictures and BBC Films
February 16, 2007	Bridge to Terabithia	international distribution outside Australia and New Zealand only; produced by Walden Media
May 16, 2007	Once	international distribution only; co-production with Samson Films
July 27, 2007	I Know Who Killed Me	international distribution outside Germany and Austria only; produced by 360 Pictures
September 14, 2007	In the Valley of Elah	international distribution only; co-production with Samuels Media; rights currently owned by FilmNation Entertainment
September 14, 2007	Resident Evil: Extinction	international distribution outside Latin America, the U.K., Ireland, Australia, New Zealand, South Africa, France, Germany, Austria, Switzerland, Italy, Spain, Scandinavia, Eastern Europe, the Baltics, Portugal, China, Japan, India and Pakistan only; produced by Constantin Film, Davis Films, Impact Pictures and Capcom
October 5, 2007	Michael Clayton	international distribution only; produced by Samuels Media, Castle Rock Entertainment, Mirage Enterprises and Section Eight Productions; rights currently owned by FilmNation Entertainment
October 9, 2007	Wrong Turn 2: Dead End	studio credit only; direct-to-video; produced by Constantin Film; distributed by 20th Century Fox Home Entertainment
November 9, 2007	P2	
November 16, 2007	Love in the Time of Cholera	international distribution only; produced by Stone Village Pictures and Grosvenor Park Productions
December 21, 2007	P.S. I Love You	international distribution only; produced by Alcon Entertainment, Grosvenor Park Productions and 2S Films
February 8, 2008	The Hottie & the Nottie	international distribution only; produced by Purple Pictures
February 14, 2008	Step Up 2: The Streets	international distribution outside Spain only; co-production with Touchstone Pictures and Offspring Entertainment
February 29, 2008	Penelope	North American distribution only
March 14, 2008	Never Back Down	co-production with Mandalay Independent Pictures
March 20, 2008	The Great Buck Howard	international distribution only; produced by Bristol Bay Productions and Playtone
April 3, 2008	Nim's Island	international distribution only; produced by Walden Media
May 1, 2008	Deception	international distribution outside Australia and New Zealand only; produced by Media Rights Capital, Seed Productions and Rifkin Eberts
May 30, 2008	The Fall	international distribution only; rights currently owned by Mubi
July 10, 2008	Red Cliff	international distribution outside China, Hong Kong, Taiwan, Japan and Korea only; produced by Beijing Film Studio, China Film Group Corporation, Lion Rock Productions, Shanghai Film Group, Emperor Multimedia Group, Avex Entertainment, Showbox and CMC Entertainment
August 15, 2008	Fly Me to the Moon	North American distribution only; produced by NWave Pictures and Illuminata Pictures
August 29, 2008	Disaster Movie	international distribution only; produced by Grosvenor Park Productions and The Safran Company
September 25, 2008	The Baader Meinhof Complex	international distribution outside France, Germany, Austria and Switzerland only; produced by Constantin Film, NEF Productions and GT Film Production
October 10, 2008	City of Ember	international distribution only; produced by Walden Media and Playtone
October 10, 2008	Happy-Go-Lucky	international distribution only; produced by Film4 Productions and Ingenious Media
October 17, 2008	Sex Drive	co-production with Alloy Entertainment
November 21, 2008	Twilight	co-production with Sunswept Entertainment and Temple Hill Entertainment
February 6, 2009	Push	distribution outside the U.K., Ireland, Australia, New Zealand, South Africa and Asia only; co-production with Icon Productions and Infinity Features
March 20, 2009	Knowing	co-production with Escape Artists
May 8, 2009	Next Day Air	
May 15, 2009	The Brothers Bloom	North American distribution only; produced by Endgame Entertainment
June 26, 2009	The Hurt Locker	U.S. distribution only; produced by Voltage Pictures; Inducted into the National Film Registry in 2020
August 6, 2009	Bandslam	co-production with Walden Media
September 11, 2009	Sorority Row	
September 25, 2009	Pandorum	international distribution outside Germany, Austria and Switzerland only; produced by Constantin Film and Impact Pictures
October 20, 2009	Wrong Turn 3: Left for Dead	studio credit only; direct-to-video; produced by Constantin Film; distributed by 20th Century Fox Home Entertainment
October 22, 2009	Pope Joan	international distribution outside Germany, Austria, Switzerland and Italy only; produced by Constantin Film, Medusa Film and Ikiru Films
October 23, 2009	Astro Boy	distribution outside Japan, China and Hong Kong only; produced by Imagi Animation Studios
November 20, 2009	The Twilight Saga: New Moon	co-production with Sunswept Entertainment and Temple Hill Entertainment

== 2010s ==
Release date	Title	Notes
January 15, 2010	The Book of Eli	international distribution only; produced by Alcon Entertainment and Silver Pictures
March 12, 2010	Remember Me	co-production with Underground Films
March 17, 2010	Baarìa	international distribution outside Italy only; produced by Medusa Film
March 19, 2010	The Ghost Writer	distribution only; produced by RP Films, France 2 Cinéma, Studio Babelsberg and Runteam III
April 8, 2010	The Runaways	international distribution only; produced by River Road Entertainment and Linson Films (Note: rights currently owned by StudioCanal)
April 30, 2010	Furry Vengeance	co-production with Participant Media and Imagenation Abu Dhabi
May 14, 2010	Letters to Juliet	co-production with Atmosphere Pictures MM
June 30, 2010	The Twilight Saga: Eclipse	co-production with Sunswept Entertainment and Temple Hill Entertainment
August 6, 2010	Step Up 3D	international distribution outside Latin America and Spain only; co-production with Touchstone Pictures and Offspring Entertainment
September 9, 2010	Resident Evil: Afterlife	distribution in the Benelux, Greece, Cyprus, the Middle East, Israel, Turkey, Hong Kong, Indonesia, the Philippines, Thailand, Laos, Cambodia and Vietnam only; produced by Constantin Film, Davis Films and Impact Pictures
October 15, 2010	Red	co-production with DC Comics and Di Bonaventura Pictures
November 5, 2010	Fair Game	distribution only; produced by River Road Entertainment and Participant Media; international rights currently owned by StudioCanal
February 25, 2011	Drive Angry	North American distribution only; produced by Millennium Films and Nu Image
April 1, 2011	Source Code	distribution only; produced by Vendome Pictures and The Mark Gordon Company
May 6, 2011	The Beaver	distribution only; produced by Participant Media, Anonymous Content and Imagenation Abu Dhabi
May 17, 2011	The Tree of Life	international distribution outside the UK and Ireland only; produced by River Road Entertainment and Plan B Entertainment;
June 24, 2011	A Better Life	co-production with Depth of Field
July 1, 2011	Larry Crowne	international distribution only; produced by Vendome Pictures and Playtone
September 30, 2011	50/50	North American distribution only; produced by Mandate Pictures and Point Grey Pictures
October 21, 2011	The Three Musketeers	distribution outside France, Germany, Austria and Switzerland only; produced by Constantin Film, NEF Productions and Impact Pictures
October 25, 2011	Wrong Turn 4: Bloody Beginnings	studio credit only; direct-to-video; produced by Constantin Film; distributed by 20th Century Fox Home Entertainment
November 18, 2011	The Twilight Saga: Breaking Dawn – Part 1	co-production with Sunswept Entertainment and Temple Hill Entertainment
December 25, 2011	The Darkest Hour	North American distribution only; co-production with Regency Enterprises and New Regency Productions
January 27, 2012	Man on a Ledge	co-production with Di Bonaventura Pictures
February 24, 2012	Gone	North American distribution only; produced by Lakeshore Entertainment and Sidney Kimmel Entertainment; last film before Summit Entertainment was absorbed by Lionsgate
distributed by Lionsgate
July 27, 2012	Step Up: Revolution	co-production with Offspring Entertainment; first film after Lionsgate acquired Summit
September 7, 2012	The Cold Light of Day	co-production with Intrepid Pictures
September 21, 2012	The Perks of Being a Wallflower	co-production with Mr. Mudd
October 12, 2012	Sinister	US distribution only; produced by Blumhouse Productions and Alliance Films
October 19, 2012	Alex Cross	US distribution only; produced by Emmett/Furla Films, Block/Hanson Productions, James Patterson Entertainment, QED International and Envision Entertainment
October 23, 2012	Wrong Turn 5: Bloodlines	studio credit only; direct-to-video; produced by Constantin Film; distributed by 20th Century Fox Home Entertainment
November 16, 2012	The Twilight Saga: Breaking Dawn – Part 2	co-production with Sunswept Entertainment and Temple Hill Entertainment
December 21, 2012	The Impossible	distribution outside Spain only; produced by Telecinco Cinema and Apaches Entertainment
February 1, 2013	Warm Bodies	co-production with Mandeville Films
February 22, 2013	Snitch	US distribution only; produced by Exclusive Media, Participant Media and Image Nation
May 31, 2013	Now You See Me	co-production with K/O Paper Products
July 3, 2013	Kevin Hart: Let Me Explain	co-production with Codeblack Films and 3 Arts Entertainment
July 19, 2013	Red 2	co-production with DC Comics and Di Bonaventura Pictures
October 18, 2013	Escape Plan	distribution only; produced by Emmett/Furla Films, Mark Canton Productions, Envision Entertainment and Boies/Schiller Film Group
November 1, 2013	Ender's Game	US distribution only; produced by OddLot Entertainment, Chartoff Productions and K/O Paper Products
November 8, 2013	12 Years a Slave	international distribution only; produced by Film4 Productions, Regency Enterprises, River Road Entertainment, Plan B Entertainment and New Regency Productions; Inducted into the National Film Registry in 2023
January 10, 2014	The Legend of Hercules	North American, UK and Irish distribution only; produced by Millennium Films
February 21, 2014	Pompeii	international distribution outside Germany, Austria and Switzerland only; produced by Constantin Film and Impact Pictures
March 21, 2014	Divergent	co-production with Red Wagon Entertainment
April 11, 2014	Draft Day	co-production with OddLot Entertainment and The Montecito Picture Company
April 18, 2014	Transcendence	international distribution outside China only; produced by Alcon Entertainment and DMG Entertainment
May 9, 2014	Tarzan	distribution outside Germany, Austria and Switzerland only; produced by Constantin Film, Ambient Entertainment and Deustcher Filmforderfonds
August 8, 2014	Step Up: All In	co-production with Offspring Entertainment
October 21, 2014	Wrong Turn 6: Last Resort	studio credit only; direct-to-video; produced by Constantin Film and Regency Enterprises; distributed by 20th Century Fox Home Entertainment
October 24, 2014	John Wick	distribution only; produced by Thunder Road Films and 87Eleven Productions
March 20, 2015	The Divergent Series: Insurgent	co-production with Red Wagon Entertainment and Mandeville Films
April 17, 2015	Child 44	co-production with Worldview Entertainment and Scott Free Productions
October 2, 2015	Freeheld	North American distribution only; produced by Endgame Entertainment
October 23, 2015	The Last Witch Hunter	co-production with One Race Films
February 26, 2016	Gods of Egypt	co-production with Thunder Road Films and Mystery Clock Cinema
March 18, 2016	The Divergent Series: Allegiant	co-production with Red Wagon Entertainment and Mandeville Films
April 15, 2016	Criminal	US, UK and Irish distribution only; produced by Millennium Films, BenderSpink and Campbell-Grobman Films
June 10, 2016	Genius	US co-distribution with Roadside Attractions only; produced by FilmNation Entertainment, Riverstone Pictures and Ingenious Media
June 10, 2016	Now You See Me 2	co-production with K/O Paper Products
July 29, 2016	Indignation	North American co-distribution with Roadside Attractions only
August 26, 2016	Mechanic: Resurrection	US, UK and Irish distribution under Summit Premiere only; produced by Millennium Media, Chartoff Productions, Winkler Films and Campbell-Grobman Films
September 2, 2016	The 9th Life of Louis Drax	US distribution under Summit Premiere only; produced by Miramax, Brightlight Pictures and Fire Axe Pictures
September 9, 2016	The Wild Life	US distribution only; produced by StudioCanal and nWave Pictures
September 30, 2016	Deepwater Horizon	co-production with Participant Media and Di Bonaventura Pictures
November 4, 2016	Hacksaw Ridge	US, UK and Irish distribution only; produced by Cross Creek Pictures, AI Film, Dearmest Films and IM Global
December 9, 2016	La La Land	co-production with Marc Platt Productions and Black Label Media
February 10, 2017	John Wick: Chapter 2	co-production with Thunder Road Pictures and 87Eleven Productions
February 24, 2017	Rock Dog	US distribution under Summit Premiere only; produced by Huayi Brothers and Mandoo Pictures
March 3, 2017	The Shack	
June 16, 2017	All Eyez on Me	US, UK and Irish distribution only; produced by Morgan Creek Entertainment, The Program Pictures and Codeblack Films
August 18, 2017	The Hitman's Bodyguard	US, UK and Irish distribution only; produced by Millennium Media, Cristal Pictures, Campbell-Grobman Films and Nu Boyana Film Studios
October 20, 2017	Only the Brave	international distribution outside Latin America, Spain and India only; produced by Black Label Media, Di Bonaventura Pictures, and Condé Nast Entertainment; distributed in North and Latin America, Spain and India by Sony Pictures Releasing and Columbia Pictures
February 16, 2018	Early Man	US distribution only; produced by StudioCanal, Aardman Animations and British Film Institute
April 20, 2018	Traffik	co-distribution with Codeblack Films only
June 29, 2018	Escape Plan 2: Hades	US co-distribution with Grindstone Entertainment Group only; produced by Emmett/Furla/Oasis Films, Leomus Pictures, The Fyzz Facility, and Ingenious Media
June 29, 2018	Uncle Drew	co-production with Temple Hill Entertainment
July 20, 2018	Blindspotting	co-distribution with Codeblack Films only
August 17, 2018	Down a Dark Hall	co-production with Fickle Fish Films, Temple Hill Entertainment, and Nostromo Pictures
August 31, 2018	Kin	distribution only; produced by No Trace Camping, 21 Laps Entertainment and Endeavor Content
October 26, 2018	Hunter Killer	US, UK and Irish distribution under Summit Premiere only; produced by Millennium Media, Original Film, G-BASE and Relativity Media
November 21, 2018	Robin Hood	co-production with Appian Way Productions, Safehouse Pictures and Thunder Road Films
February 8, 2019	Cold Pursuit	US distribution only; produced by StudioCanal, Paradox Films and MAS Production
March 22, 2019	Dragged Across Concrete	US distribution only; produced by Unified Pictures, Assemble Media, Cinestate, Endeavor Content, Look to the Sky Films, and Moot Point Productions
April 12, 2019	Hellboy	US, UK and Irish distribution only; produced by Millennium Media, Lawrence Gordon/Lloyd Levin Productions, Davis Films, Dark Horse Entertainment, Nu Boyana Film Studios and Campbell-Grobman Films
May 3, 2019	Long Shot	co-production with Good Universe, Point Grey Pictures and Denver and Delilah Productions
May 17, 2019	John Wick: Chapter 3 - Parabellum	co-production with Thunder Road Pictures and 87Eleven Productions
June 21, 2019	Anna	distribution outside France, China and Hong Kong only; produced by EuropaCorp and TF1 Films Production
June 26, 2019	Step Up: Year of the Dance	uncredited; co-production with Yue Hua Pictures and Shanghai Infinity Pictures
July 2, 2019	Escape Plan: The Extractors	US co-distribution with Grindstone Entertainment Group only; produced by Highland Film Group, Emmett/Furla/Oasis Films, Leomus Pictures, Diamond Film Productions, The Fyzz Facility, Ingenious Media and MoviePass Films
November 8, 2019	Midway	US, UK and Irish distribution only; produced by Centropolis Entertainment, AGC Studios, Ruyi Films, Starlight Culture Entertainment, Street Entertainment, Entertainment One, Bona Film Group and the Mark Gordon Company

== 2020s ==
Release date	Title	Notes
October 8, 2020	Run	distributed by Hulu
December 18, 2020	Fatale	North American, UK, Irish and French distribution only; produced by Endeavor Content and Hidden Empire Film Group
April 9, 2021	Voyagers	US distribution only; produced by AGC Studios, Thunder Road Films and Ingenious Media
June 16, 2021	Hitman's Wife's Bodyguard	US, UK and Irish distribution only; produced by Millennium Media and Campbell Grobman Films
February 4, 2022	Moonfall	North American distribution only; produced by Centropolis Entertainment, AGC Studios, Street Entertainment, Tencent Pictures and Huayi Brothers
January 27, 2023	Shotgun Wedding	co-production with Mandeville Films and Nuyorican Productions; distributed by Amazon Studios
March 24, 2023	John Wick: Chapter 4	co-production with Thunder Road Films and 87Eleven Entertainment
August 9, 2024	Borderlands	co-production with Media Capital Technologies, Arad Productions, Picturestart, Gearbox Studios and 2K
September 20, 2024	Never Let Go	co-production with Media Capital Technologies, 21 Laps Entertainment and HalleHolly
May 9, 2025	Wick Is Pain	
June 6, 2025	Ballerina	co-production with Thunder Road Films and 87Eleven Entertainment
November 14, 2025	Now You See Me: Now You Don't	co-production with Secret Hideout
