= List of StudioCanal films =

This is a list of films produced, co-financed and distributed by StudioCanal.

== 1990s ==
Title	Release date	Notes
The Doors	March 1, 1991	
Terminator 2: Judgment Day	July 3, 1991	
JFK	December 20, 1991	Nominee of the Academy Award for Best Picture
The Mambo Kings	February 28, 1992	
Memoirs of an Invisible Man	February 28, 1992	
Basic Instinct	March 20, 1992	
The Power of One	March 27, 1992	
The Vagrant	May 15, 1992	
Universal Soldier	July 10, 1992	
Bitter Moon	September 23, 1992	
Under Siege	October 9, 1992	
Damage	December 9, 1992	
Chaplin	December 25, 1992	
Arizona Dream	January 6, 1993	
Sommersby	February 5, 1993	
Falling Down	February 26, 1993	
Cliffhanger	May 28, 1993	
Made in America	May 28, 1993	
Free Willy	July 16, 1993	
That Night	August 27, 1993	
Heaven & Earth	December 25, 1993	
La Cité de la peur	March 9, 1994	Produced by Telema
Stargate	October 28, 1994	
Murder in the First	January 20, 1995	
Free Willy 2: The Adventure Home	July 19, 1995	
Carrington	September 22, 1995	
The City of Lost Children	December 15, 1995	Co-production with Centre National de la Cinématographie, Eurimages, France 3 Cinéma, Televisión Española; distributed by Union Générale Cinématographique (France), Concorde-Castle Rock/Turner (Germany) and Sony Pictures Classics (United States)
Cutthroat Island	December 22, 1995	
Beaumarchais	March 20, 1996	
Bernie	November 27, 1996	
Assassin(s)	May 17, 1997	
Ghost Dog: The Way of the Samurai	May 18, 1999	
The Straight Story	May 21, 1999	
Season's Beatings	November 24, 1999	

== 2000s ==
Title	Release date	Notes
Bruiser	February 13, 2000	
U-571	April 21, 2000	co-production with Dino De Laurentiis Company and Universal Pictures
Cecil B. Demented	August 11, 2000	
The Man Who Cried	September 2, 2000	
The Weight of Water	September 9, 2000	
Billy Elliot	September 28, 2000	French distribution only; co-production with BBC Film, Tiger Aspect Productions, Universal Pictures and Working Title Films; distributed by Universal Focus in the United States and United International Pictures internationally
Lucky Numbers	October 27, 2000	European and African distribution only; co-production with Mad Chance Productions and Alphaville; distributed elsewhere by Paramount Pictures
Murderous Maids	November 22, 2000	
O Brother, Where Art Thou?	December 22, 2000	French distribution only; co-production with Touchstone Pictures, Universal Pictures and Working Title Films; distributed elsewhere by Buena Vista Pictures Distribution and United International Pictures
Harrison's Flowers	January 24, 2001	
Brotherhood of the Wolf	January 31, 2001	
Bridget Jones's Diary	April 4, 2001	French distribution through Mars Distribution only; co-production with Working Title Films, Little Bird and Universal Pictures; distributed by Miramax Films in the United States and United International Pictures internationally
Mulholland Drive	May 16, 2001	Produced by Canal+ distributed by Universal Pictures (United States)
Human Nature	May 18, 2001	distributed by Fine Line Features (United States)
Bully	June 15, 2001	
The Score	July 13, 2001	
Brooklyn Babylon	August 17, 2001	
Captain Corelli's Mandolin	August 17, 2001	French distribution through BAC Films only; co-production with Working Title Films and Universal Pictures; distributed by Miramax Films in the United Kingdom, Ireland, Australia, New Zealand and Japan and United International Pictures internationally
Sex and Lucia	August 24, 2001	
Chasing Sleep	September 16, 2001	Produced by Canal+
Chaos	October 3, 2001	
Long Time Dead	January 18, 2002	
40 Days and 40 Nights	March 1, 2002	French distribution through Mars Distribution only; co-production with Universal Pictures, Working Title Films and MiLo Productions; distributed by Miramax Films in the United States and United International Pictures internationally
Ali G Indahouse	March 22, 2002	co-production with Working Title Films and Universal Pictures
About a Boy	April 26, 2002	co-production with Working Title Films and Universal Pictures
Irréversible	May 22, 2002	
The Pianist	May 24, 2002	Nominee of the Academy Award for Best Picture
The Red Siren	August 22, 2002	
The Guru	August 23, 2002	co-production with Working Title Films and Universal Pictures
My Little Eye	September 10, 2002	co-production with Working Title Films
Ned Kelly	March 27, 2003	co-production with Working Title Films
Levity	April 4, 2003	co-production with FilmColony and Revelations Entertainment; distributed by Sony Pictures Classics
Johnny English	April 11, 2003	co-production with Working Title Films and Universal Pictures
The Shape of Things	May 9, 2003	
Love Actually	November 7, 2003	Co-production with Working Title Films and Universal Pictures
Shaun of the Dead	March 9, 2004	French distribution through Mars Distribution only; co-production with Universal Pictures, Working Title Films and Big Talk Productions; distributed by Rogue Pictures in the United States and United International Pictures internationally
Clean	March 27, 2004	Produced by Canal+
The Calcium Kid	April 30, 2004	
Riding Giants	July 21, 2004	
Thunderbirds	July 23, 2004	co-production with Working Title Films and Universal Pictures
Wimbledon	September 17, 2004	co-production with Working Title Films and Universal Pictures
Bridget Jones: The Edge of Reason	November 8, 2004	French distribution through Mars Distribution only; co-production with Working Title Films, Miramax Films and Little Bird; distributed elsewhere by Universal Pictures
The Interpreter	April 8, 2005	co-production with Working Title Films and Universal Pictures
Pride and Prejudice	September 11, 2005	co-production with Working Title Films and Focus Features
Nanny McPhee	October 21, 2005	co-production with Working Title Films, Universal Pictures and Metro-Goldwyn-Mayer
United 93	April 28, 2006	co-production with Working Title Films and Universal Pictures
Franklin and the Turtle Lake Treasure	September 6, 2006	
Inland Empire	September 6, 2006	
Sixty Six	November 3, 2006	
Smokin' Aces	December 9, 2006	French distribution only; co-production with Relativity Media and Working Title Films; distributed elsewhere by Universal Pictures
Hot Fuzz	February 14, 2007	French distribution only; co-production with Working Title Films and Big Talk Productions; distributed by Rogue Pictures in the United States and Universal Pictures internationally
Gone	March 9, 2007	French distribution only; co-production with Working Title Films; distributed elsewhere by Universal Pictures
Mr. Bean's Holiday	March 24, 2007	French distribution only; co-production with Working Title Films; distributed elsewhere by Universal Pictures
Steak	June 20, 2007	French distribution only; co-produced with La Petite Reine
Atonement	August 29, 2007	French distribution only; co-production with Working Title Films; distributed by Focus Features in the United States and Universal Pictures internationally Nominee of the Academy Award for Best Picture
Sa majesté Minor	October 10, 2007	
Elizabeth: The Golden Age	October 12, 2007	French distribution only; co-production with Working Title Films; distributed elsewhere by Universal Pictures
My Blueberry Nights	November 28, 2007	French distribution only; co-production with Jet Tone Films
Definitely, Maybe	February 14, 2008	French distribution only; co-production with Working Title Films; distributed elsewhere by Universal Pictures
Wild Child	August 15, 2008	
Burn After Reading	August 27, 2008	French distribution only; co-production with Relativity Media and Working Title Films; distributed by Focus Features elsewhere
RocknRolla	September 5, 2008	French distribution only; produced by Dark Castle Entertainment; distributed elsewhere by Warner Bros. Pictures
Frost/Nixon	October 15, 2008	French distribution only; co-production with Working Title Films and Imagine Entertainment; distributed elsewhere by Universal Pictures; Nominee of the Academy Award for Best Picture
The Boat That Rocked	April 1, 2009	French distribution only; co-production with Working Title Films; distributed by Focus Features in the United States and Universal Pictures internationally
State of Play	April 17, 2009	French distribution only; distributed elsewhere by Universal Pictures
The Soloist	April 24, 2009	French distribution only; co-production with Universal Pictures, DreamWorks Pictures, Working Title Films, Participant Media and Krasnoff/Foster Entertainment distributed by Paramount Pictures in North America and Universal Pictures internationally
Chloe	September 13, 2009	
One for the Road	September 23, 2009	
A Serious Man	October 2, 2009	French distribution only; co-production with Relativity Media, Working Title Films and Mike Zoss Productions; distributed elsewhere by Focus Features; Nominee of the Academy Award for Best Picture

== 2010s ==
Title	Release date	Notes
Green Zone	February 26, 2010	French distribution only; co-production with Relativity Media and Working Title Films; distributed elsewhere by Universal Pictures
Nanny McPhee and the Big Bang	March 26, 2010	French distribution only; co-production with Relativity Media and Working Title Films; distributed elsewhere by Universal Pictures
Babies	May 17, 2010	
The Last Exorcism	August 27, 2010	
Senna	October 7, 2010	
The Tourist	December 10, 2010	distribution in the U.K., Ireland, France, Germany, Austria, Switzerland, Italy, the Middle East and Turkey only; co-production with GK Films and Spyglass Entertainment; distributed elsewhere by Sony Pictures Releasing through Columbia Pictures
Unknown	February 18, 2011	distribution in the U.K., Ireland, France, Germany, Austria, Switzerland and Belgium only; co-production with Dark Castle Entertainment
Attack the Block	March 12, 2011	co-production with Film4 Productions and Big Talk Productions
Tinker Tailor Soldier Spy	September 5, 2011	
Johnny English Reborn	October 7, 2011	French distribution only; co-production with Working Title Films and Relativity Media; distributed elsewhere by Universal Pictures
The Awakening	November 11, 2011	co-production with BBC Films, Creative Scotland, Lipsync Productions and Origin Pictures
Bel Ami	March 9, 2012	U.K., Irish, French and German distribution only; produced by Redwave Films, XIX Entertainment, Protagonist Pictures and Rai Cinema
Sightseers	November 30, 2012	co-production with Film4 Productions, British Film Institute, Big Talk Productions and Rook Films
Ernest & Celestine	December 12, 2012	U.K., Irish and French distribution only
Broken City	January 18, 2013	U.K., Irish and French distribution only; produced by Regency Enterprises, Black Bear Pictures and Emmett/Furla Films
I Give It a Year	February 8, 2013	
The Last Exorcism Part II	February 28, 2013	
To the Wonder	April 12, 2013	UK, Irish, German and Austrian distribution only
The Look of Love	April 26, 2013	
Inside Llewyn Davis	May 19, 2013	co-production with Anton Capital Entertainment, Scott Rudin Productions and Mike Zoss Productions
The Kings of Summer	May 31, 2013	UK, Irish and German distribution only
The Way, Way Back	July 5, 2013	Australian and New Zealand distribution only
Alan Partridge: Alpha Papa	August 7, 2013	co-production with BBC Films, British Film Institute and Baby Cow Productions
Mindscape	October 13, 2013	
In Fear	November 15, 2013	co-production with Film4 Productions, Anton Capital Entertainment and Big Talk Productions
'71	February 7, 2014	
Non-Stop	February 28, 2014	co-production with Silver Pictures and Anton Capital Entertainment
The Two Faces of January	April 16, 2014	
Chef	May 8, 2014	German, Austrian, Australian and New Zealand distribution only
Elle l'adore	June 18, 2014	
The House of Magic	July 25, 2014	
Before I Go to Sleep	September 4, 2014	co-production with Millennium Films and Scott Free Productions
Serena	October 24, 2014	co-production with 2929 Entertainment, Chockstone Pictures, Nick Wechsler Productions and Anton Capital Entertainment
Paddington	December 12, 2014	co-production with Heyday Films
Shaun the Sheep Movie	February 6, 2015	co-production with Aardman Animations; Nominated - Academy Award for Best Animated Feature
The Gunman	March 20, 2015	
Carol	May 17, 2015 (Cannes)	
Man Up	May 29, 2015	
We Are Your Friends	August 28, 2015	
Legend	September 9, 2015	
Blinky Bill the Movie	September 17, 2015	Australian and New Zealand distribution only; produced by Studio 100 Film and Flying Bark Productions
Macbeth	October 2, 2015	
The Program	October 16, 2015	
April and the Extraordinary World	November 4, 2015	
Heidi	December 10, 2015	
A Bigger Splash	February 12, 2016	
Bastille Day	April 22, 2016	
Our Kind of Traitor	July 1, 2016	
Swallows and Amazons	August 19, 2016	
Bridget Jones's Baby	September 5, 2016	French, German and Austrian distribution only; co-production with Perfect World Pictures, Miramax and Working Title Films; distributed elsewhere by Universal Pictures
Dance Academy: The Comeback	April 7, 2017	Australian and New Zealand distribution only; produced by Werner Film Productions, ZDF Enterprises and Australian Children's Television Foundation
Logan Lucky	August 18, 2017	UK, Irish, German and Austrian distribution only
Only the Brave	October 20, 2017	German, Austrian, Australian and New Zealand distribution only
Jigsaw	October 27, 2017	German, Austrian, Australian and New Zealand distribution only; produced by Lionsgate and Twisted Pictures
Jalouse	November 8, 2017	
Paddington 2	November 12, 2017	co-production with Heyday Films
The Commuter	January 19, 2018	co-production with The Picture Company and Ombra Films
Early Man	January 26, 2018	co-production with Aardman Animations and BFI
The Mercy	February 9, 2018	co-production with BBC Films, Blueprint Pictures and Galatée Films
The World Is Yours	April 18, 2018	co-production with Iconoclast, Chi-Fou-Mi Productions and Cactus Flower
The Guernsey Literary and Potato Peel Pie Society	April 20, 2018	co-production with Blueprint Pictures and Mazur/Kaplan Company
Yardie	August 31, 2018	
Johnny English Strikes Again	October 12, 2018	co-production with Working Title Films and Perfect World Pictures; distributed by Universal Pictures
Sink or Swim	October 24, 2018	co-production with Trésor Films and Chi-Fou-Mi Productions
Cold Pursuit	February 8, 2019	co-production with Summit Entertainment, Paradox Films and MAS Production
Someone, Somewhere	September 11, 2019	
A Shaun the Sheep Movie: Farmageddon	October 18, 2019	co-production with Aardman Animations

== 2020s ==
Title	Release date	Notes
Radioactive	June 15, 2020	co-production with Working Title Films and Shoebox Films
The Secret Garden	October 23, 2020	co-production with Heyday Films; distributed by Sky Cinema
The Last Letter from Your Lover	March 12, 2021	International distribution by Netflix
Wrath of Man	April 22, 2021	German, Austrian, Australian and New Zealand distribution only; produced by Miramax and Toff Guy
Gunpowder Milkshake	July 14, 2021	produced by the German branch; co-production with The Picture Company, Babelsberg Studio, Canal+ and Ciné+; distribution in selected territories
Around the World in 80 Days	August 4, 2021	co-production with Cottonwood Media and France 3 Cinema
The Railway Children Return	July 15, 2022	
Ernest & Celestine: A Trip to Gibberitia	December 14, 2022	
Epic Tails	February 10, 2023	UK and Irish distribution and German and Austrian co-distribution with Plaion Pictures only
What's Love Got to Do with It?	February 24, 2023	co-production with Working Title Films and Instinct Productions
All Your Faces	March 29, 2023	
Farang	June 28, 2023	
Past Lives	August 17, 2023	UK, Irish, Australian, New Zealand, German and Austrian distribution only; released in Germany and Austria under the Arthaus label Nominee of the Academy Award for Best Picture
Retribution	August 26, 2023	
Toni	September 6, 2023	
Enkel für Fortgeschrittene	September 7, 2023	
No Chains, No Masters	September 18, 2023	
Saw X	September 28, 2023	German, Austrian, Australian and New Zealand distribution only
Cat Person	October 6, 2023	
Suddenly	December 6, 2023	
Role Play	January 12, 2024	co-production with Yes, Norman Productions and The Picture Company; distributed by Amazon MGM Studios
Autumn and the Black Jaguar	February 1, 2024	
Wicked Little Letters	February 23, 2024	co-production with Film4, Blueprint Pictures, South of the River Pictures and People Person Pictures
Imaginary	March 7, 2024	Australian and New Zealand distribution only
Back to Black	April 12, 2024	co-production with Monumental Pictures
Sting	May 16, 2024	distribution in the UK, Ireland, France, Germany, Austria, Switzerland, Australia, New Zealand and the Benelux only; distributed in Poland by StudioCanal affiliate Kino Świat
Being Maria	June 19, 2024	studio credit only; distributed in France by Haut et Court
Something in the Water	June 21, 2024	
We Live in Time	September 6, 2024	co-production with Film4, SunnyMarch and Shoebox Films
Runt	September 12, 2024	co-production with See Pictures
Lee	September 13, 2024	UK and Irish co-distribution with Sky Cinema and German, Austrian, Australian and New Zealand distribution only
The Outrun	September 27, 2024	UK, Irish, French, German and Austrian distribution only
Der Buchspazierer	October 10, 2024	
Beating Hearts	October 16, 2024	
Woodwalkers	October 24, 2024	
Paddington in Peru	November 8, 2024	co-production with Columbia Pictures, Kinoshita Group, Marmalade Pictures and Stage 6 Films
The Devil's Bath	November 14, 2024	German co-distribution with Plaion Pictures only
The Most Precious of Cargoes	November 20, 2024	
Saint-Exupéry	December 11, 2024	
Heretic	December 26, 2024	German and Austrian co-distribution with Plaion Pictures only; distributed in Poland by StudioCanal affiliate Kino Świat
Maria	January 10, 2025	UK, Irish, German, Austrian and Polish distribution only
Bridget Jones: Mad About the Boy	February 14, 2025	French distribution only; co-production with Miramax and Working Title Films; distributed elsewhere by Universal Pictures; released on Peacock in the U.S.
The Monkey	February 20, 2025	German and Austrian co-distribution with Plaion Pictures only; distributed in Poland by StudioCanal affiliate Kino Świat
The Legend of Ochi	May 1, 2025	German and Austrian co-distribution with Plaion Pictures only; distributed in Poland by StudioCanal affiliate Kino Świat
Colours of Time	May 22, 2025	
The Life of Chuck	August 22, 2025	UK, Irish, Australian and New Zealand distribution only
Silent Night, Deadly Night	December 12, 2025	international distribution only; first film released under the Sixth Dimension banner
How to Make A Killing	February 27, 2026	
Pressure	May 29, 2026	
Ice Cream Man	August 6, 2026	distribution in the UK, Ireland, France, Germany, Austria, Poland, the Benelux, Australia and New Zealand under the Sixth Dimension label only
Elsinore	November 20, 2026	
Ink	2026	
What Happens at Night	TBA	Co-production with Apple Studios, Sikelia Productions, Appian Way Productions and Excellent Cadaver
Fonda	TBA	Co-production with mk2 Films, Les Films de Pierre, Les Films Pelléas, Les Films du Fleuve, House Productions and BBC Film
Escape from New York	TBA	In development
Untitled Paddington in Peru sequel	TBA	In development
Mr. Men Little Miss The Movie	TBA	In production.
The Last Bear		Co-production with ZQ Entertainment, Prime Universe Films and WexWorks
