= Fleurs (Former Ghosts album) =

Studio album by Former Ghosts
- Released: October 26, 2009
- Recorded: 2009
- Genre: Synthpop
- Label: Upset The Rhythm

Former Ghosts chronology
Fleurs (2009)	New Love (2010)

Professional ratings
Review scores
Source	Rating
Allmusic	3.5/5 stars
Drowned In Sound	(7/10)

Fleurs is the debut album from the experimental electronic group Former Ghosts, a collaborative effort between Jamie Stewart (Xiu Xiu), Freddy Ruppert ("This Song Is A Mess But So Am I") and Nika Roza (Zola Jesus).

== Track listing ==
1. "Us and Now" - 3:25
2. "Hold On" - 4:28
3. "Mother" - 4:04
4. "Choices" - 4:21
5. "In Earth's Palm" - 3:41
6. "I Wave" - 3:51
7. "Dreams" - 4:25
8. "Unfolding" - 3:11
9. "Flowers" - 3:26
10. "The Bull and the Ram" - 5:35
11. "Hello Again" - 3:31
12. "This Is My Last Goodbye" - 3:22
