= List of Lionsgate films (1997–1999) =

This is a list of films produced and/or distributed by Lionsgate Films from 1997 to 1999.

The studio was originally founded in 1962 as Cinepix Film Properties. Cinepix would be acquired by Lionsgate in 1997, and adopt its current name in 1998. As of November 2017, Lionsgate's films grossed approximately $8.2 billion.

Release date	Film	Notes
March 5, 1997	The Daytrippers (Note: Owned by Fiasco Photoplays and Trick Films, with U.S. distribution rights currently licensed to Janus Films and The Criterion Collection)	limited release, As Cinepix Film Properties, US distribution only.
June 6, 1997	The Pillow Book (Note: Distribution rights currently owned by Film Movement)	limited release; As Cinepix Film Properties
June 27, 1997	Stag	limited release, As Cinepix Film Properties
June 29, 1997	Texas Chainsaw Massacre: The Next Generation (Note: Owned by Sony Pictures)	limited release; As Cinepix Film Properties produced by Ultra Muchos and River City Films
July 4, 1997	Guantanamera	As Cinepix Film Properties
January 18, 1998	Johnny Skidmarks	As Cinepix Film Properties
February 20, 1998	The Wrong Guy	limited release
March 6, 1998	Love and Death on Long Island	limited release; U.S. distribution only
April 10, 1998	Junk Mail	limited release; distribution only. Also known as Budbringeren
June 5, 1998	Mr. Jealousy	limited release
June 26, 1998	Buffalo '66	Nominated - BIFA for Best Foreign Independent Film co-production with Muse Productions
August 7, 1998	The Crazy Stranger	limited release; U.S. distribution only
August 28, 1998	A Merry War	limited release; Also known as Keep the Aspidistra Flying
August 28, 1998	I Married a Strange Person!	limited release
October 16, 1998	The Alarmist	limited release
October 16, 1998	Blood, Guts, Bullets and Octane	limited release
November 3, 1998	The First 9½ Weeks	As Lions Gate Films International, limited release
November 6, 1998	Gods and Monsters	Independent Spirit Award for Best Film; National Board of Review Award for Best Film; Nominated - BIFA for Best British Independent Film; Nominated - Critics' Choice Movie Award for Best Picture; Nominated - Golden Globe Award for Best Motion Picture - Drama; Nominated - Producers Guild of America Award for Best Theatrical Motion Picture co-production with Regent Entertainment and BBC Films
November 20, 1998	Savior	limited release
December 4, 1998	Hi-Life	limited release
December 4, 1998	Jerry and Tom (Note: Owned by Miramax, with distribution handled by Paramount Pictures)	limited release, co-production with Miramax Films
December 4, 1998	Shattered Image	limited release
December 30, 1998	Affliction (Note: Owned by Library Rights Company (UK), Ltd. and Zelus Film Holding Company, LLC, with distribution rights currently licensed to Resurgence Media Group, which has sub-licensed U.S. rights to Shout! Studios)	Nominated - Independent Spirit Award for Best Film co-production with Largo Entertainment
January 17, 1999	Giving It Up	limited release, distribution only.
April 9, 1999	Metroland (Note: Distribution rights currently owned by Shout! Studios)	limited release, distribution only.
April 16, 1999	Friends & Lovers	limited release, distribution only.
May 7, 1999	The Empty Mirror	limited release, distribution only.
June 11, 1999	The Red Violin	Nominated - Golden Globe Award for Best Foreign Language Film co-production with Channel 4 Films
July 2, 1999	Elvis Gratton II	limited release
July 9, 1999	The Dinner Game (Note: Owned by Gaumont, with U.S. distribution rights currently owned by Under the Milky Way)	limited release
July 16, 1999	I'm Losing You	limited release; co-production with Killer Films
September 3, 1999	All the Little Animals (Note: Distribution rights currently owned by Brainstorm Media)	limited release, distribution only.
September 24, 1999	Dog Park	Distribution by New Line Cinema
October 26, 1999	Hitman's Run	limited release
November 5, 1999	Last Night	limited release
November 12, 1999	Dogma (Note: Currently owned by Triple Media Film and View Askew Productions, with North American rights licensed to Iconic Events)	US theatrical distribution only; produced by View Askew Productions
December 29, 1999	Mr. Death: The Rise and Fall of Fred A. Leuchter, Jr.	limited release, distribution only
