= Party at Tiffany's =

- Genre: Documentary
- Starring: Tiffany Young
- Country of origin: United States
- No. of seasons: 1
- No. of episodes: 6

Production
- Executive producers: John Morayniss; Michael Kot; Tara Long
- Running time: 21 minutes
- Production company: Entertainment One Television

Original release
- Network: Oprah Winfrey Network
- Release: December 3 – December 17, 2011

Party at Tiffany's is an American reality-docuseries on the Oprah Winfrey Network (OWN). The series premiered on December 3, 2011. The show initially was named Pink Pastry before OWN picked up the series from TLC.

== Premise ==
The series follows Tiffany Young and her Atlanta, Georgia-based bakery, Pink Pastry Parlor.

== Episodes ==
No.	Title	Original release date
1	"Tiffany Makes a Splash"	December 3, 2011
2	"Oodles of Poodles"	December 3, 2011
3	"Princess + Diva = Priva"	December 10, 2011
4	"First One to Fall Asleep Gets Got"	December 10, 2011
5	"It's Cash Money, Baby!"	December 17, 2011
6	"I Do...for Pastries"	December 17, 2011

== Reception ==
Melissa Camacho of Common Sense Media wrote, "Some of the scenes, especially those with the Parlettes, seem a little rehearsed, too. But the overall show is a positive one, and those who tune in will find a good role model here."
