= All American Orgy =

- Directed by: Andrew Drazek
- Written by: Ted Beck
- Produced by: Brent Caballero; Jordan Kessler; James T. Bruce IV
- Starring: Laura Silverman; Adam Busch; Aimee-Lynn Chadwick; Jordan Kessler; Yasmine Kittles; Ted Beck
- Cinematography: Dave McFarland
- Edited by: Andrew Drazek
- Production companies: Finish Films; Louisiana Media Productions
- Distributed by: Phase 4 Films
- Release dates: October 11, 2009 (New Orleans Film Festival); October 5, 2010 (United States)
- Running time: 98 minutes
- Country: United States
- Language: English

All American Orgy is a 2009 dark comedy film written by Ted Beck and directed by Andrew Drazek. The film premiered October 11, 2009 at the New Orleans Film Festival. The plot features three couples who try group sex at a lakeside strawberry farm, naively hoping it will lead to enlightenment.

== Cast ==
- Laura Silverman as Tina
- Adam Busch as Alan
- Aimee-Lynn Chadwick as Rachel
- Jordan Kessler as Gordon
- Yasmine Kittles as Yasmine
- Ted Beck as Todd
- Edrick Browne as Larenz

== Release ==
Originally produced as Cummings Farm, the film was acquired by Phase 4 Films at the 2010 Slamdance Film Festival. The film was released on DVD and digital under its new title on October 5, 2010 and also picked up by the Showtime Network.

The film was given a classification of 18 by the British Board of Film Classification.

== Reception ==
The film received reviews from publications including Decider, LA Weekly, Slackerwood, eFilmCritic, and FilmMonthly.
