= Tearist =

American electronic and industrial band

- Origin: Los Angeles, California, United States
- Genres: Electronic; Industrial
- Years active: 2009–present
- Members: Yasmine Kittles
- Past members: Will Stangelad; Menchaca

Tearist is an American electronic and industrial band formed in 2009 by Yasmine Kittles (vocals, percussion, synthesizer) and William Strangeland (synthesizer, programming) in Los Angeles, California.

== History ==
The members of Tearist have stated that they were intending to create a movement more than a band, accepting all influences and dissecting them to allow for a new and instinctual musical product to emerge.

Their debut album on Thin Wrist Records is a collection of live recordings titled Living: 2009—Present. It captures their lo-fi aesthetic with found objects, howling vocals and crowd noise.

== Reception ==
LA Record described Living: 2009—Present as "an unified artifact that defies the span of time in which it was recorded," and called the album, "a gem that transcends the traditional live album and verges on being an art-object in and of itself." Rolling Stone described Tearist as being "about pushing people out of their comfort zone to the point where they question their own existence."

Living: 2009—Present was described as a "gothy electro-noise duo" by the Los Angeles Times music blog, and LA Weekly wrote in a cover interview that, "Tearist became the most crucial musical project to come out of Los Angeles in recent years."

== Discography ==
Albums

- Living: 2009–Present (2011)]

EPs

- Tearist s/t (2010)
- Purple Video (2012)
- CDR (2009)

Singles

- "Headless" (2010) (re-release 2015)

Soundtracks

- Blue Ruin (2013)

== Television appearances ==
- Last Call with Carson Daly (2014) – season 14, episode 14
