= PalmStar Media =

American film and television production company

PalmStar Media Capital is a film financing company based in Philadelphia. It was founded by its CEO, Kevin Frakes in 2010.

== History ==
PalmStar Entertainment was co-founded in 2004 by Kevin Frakes and Stephan Paternot. In 2010, Frakes co-founded PalmStar Media Capital with Peggy Taylor and Frank Pollifrone to focus on financing films. In July 2017, PalmStar Media purchased all the assets of National Lampoon, Inc., including trademark and library of print, audio, movie, and video content.

In 2014, PalmStar filed a breach of contract lawsuit against Zero Gravity Management over the casting of Ben Affleck in The Accountant, alleging that it shut PalmStar out of the production against a co-production agreement.

== The Alchemist ==
In 2016, PalmStar purchased the film rights of the Paulo Coelho novel The Alchemist for $6.5 million. Initially, shooting was to begin in September 2021, but in July 2021, The Hollywood Reporter announced that the movie adaptation had fallen apart. Legendary Entertainment has acquired the TV, film and ancillary rights to the novel in October 2023 and intends to develop the film with Sony's TriStar Pictures and PalmStar.

== Collaboration deals ==
In October 2014, PalmStar signed on a multi-year financing deal with Basil Iwanyk's Thunder Road Pictures, and according to this agreement, Thunder Road would get $200 million funds from PalmStar. Thunder Road would use it to fully finance and produce five to six independent films from $20 to $50 million budget range per year.

In February 2015, PalmStar signed on a deal with Dylan Sellers' Rivers Edge Films to handle all company's production and development costs, and together, PalmStar would finance four to five films for Rivers Edge with budgets between $20 million to $40 million. In August 2015, PalmStar signed a deal with Jeremy Renner and Don Handfield's production company The Combine to finance two to three films per year.

PalmStar has also partnered with Anthony Bregman's Likely Story and Buddy Patrick's Windy Hill Pictures.
