= Black Label Media =

Media company based in Los Angeles, US

Black Label Media is a Los Angeles based independent film production, television production, podcast, entertainment and finance company founded in 2013. The company had a 25 percent stake in La La Land (2016).

== History ==
The company was founded in 2013 by Molly Smith, the daughter of billionaire Frederick W. Smith who founded FedEx and invested in the company, and Thad Luckinbill, an actor on Young and the Restless for 11 years, and twin brother Trent Luckinbill.

The origins of Black Label Media were started as Belle Pictures, an affiliated production company of Alcon Entertainment and Warner Bros., but the company soon underwent name change, with Black Label Media's intentions was to focus on adult, mid-level budget fare, for greater flexibility and autonomy.

The name of the company was taken from the American Express Centurion "Black Card" and in part by Johnnie Walker Black whiskey.

On April 12, 2016, the company launched its television division with a deal at ABC Signature and ABC Studios, to develop television and movie projects. On April 24, 2017, two of Black Label Media's projects, like Only the Brave and Sicario: Day of the Soldado, were transferred from Lionsgate to Sony Pictures.

On June 27, 2019, it expanded to podcasts with a deal at the Bleav Podcast Network. On February 11, 2020, Alcon Entertainment teamed up with Black Label Media to purchase the film rights to Postscript. On September 4, 2020, Sony Pictures Entertainment announced that it would acquire Devotion, with STX Entertainment handling international rights of the picture, with Black Label Media producing.

== Films ==
- Begin Again (2013)
- The Good Lie (2014)
- '71 (2014)
- Demolition (2015)
- Sicario (2015)
- Breaking a Monster (2015)
- La La Land (2016)
- Rebel in the Rye (2017)
- Only the Brave (2017)
- 12 Strong (2018)
- Sicario: Day of the Soldado (2018)
- Sierra Burgess Is a Loser (2018)
- Broken Diamonds (2021)
- Devotion (2022)
- Whitney Houston: I Wanna Dance with Somebody (2022)
- Reptile (2023)
- Die My Love (2025)
- Ebenezer (2026)
