= James Wolk =

American actor (born 1985)

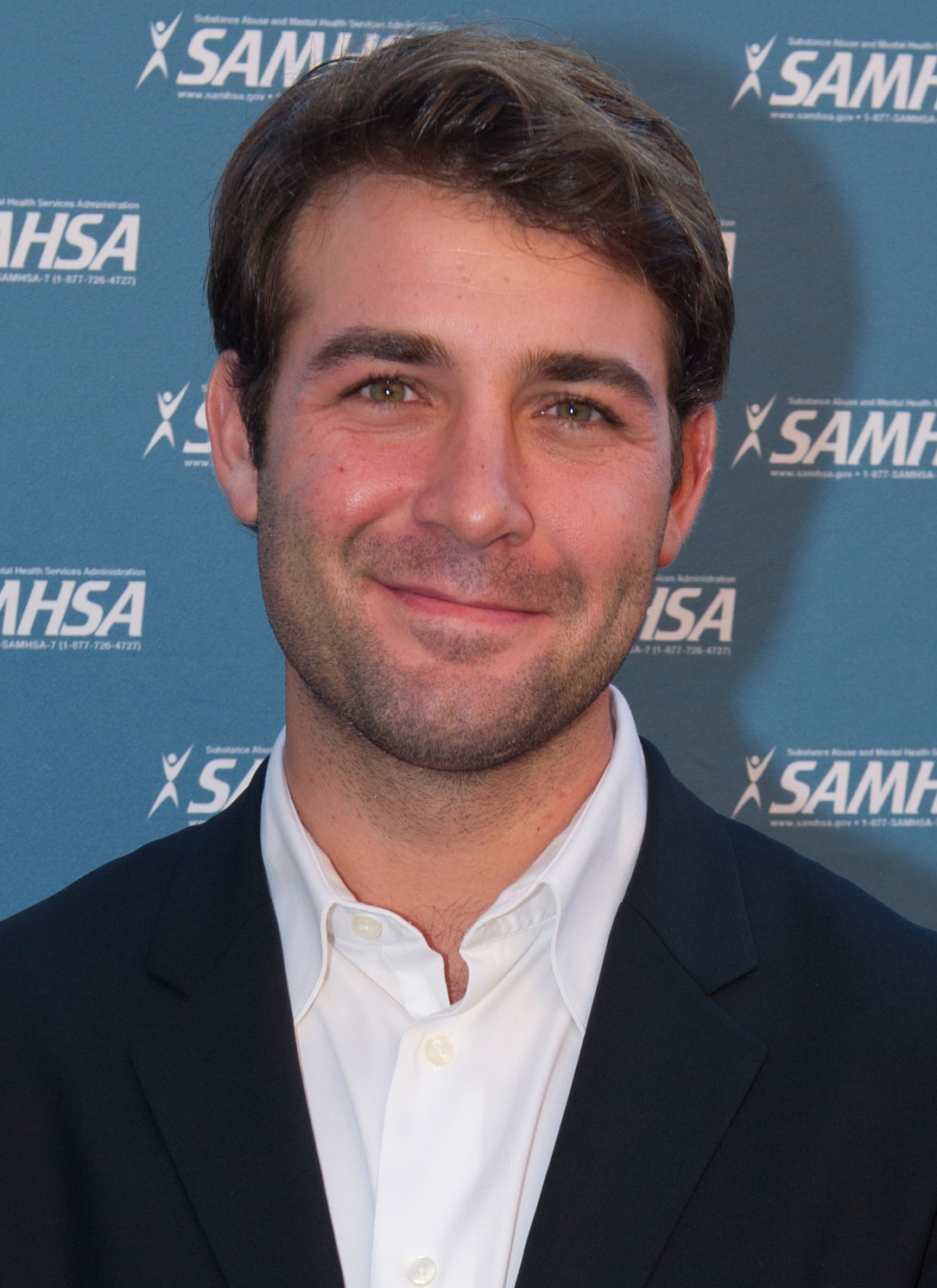
- Wolk in 2014
- Born: James Joseph Wolk; March 22, 1985 (age 41); Farmington Hills, Michigan, U.S.
- Education: University of Michigan (BFA)
- Occupation: Actor
- Years active: 2006–present
- Spouse: Elizabeth Jae Byrd (m. 2015)
- Children: 2

James Joseph Wolk (born March 22, 1985) is an American actor. He is known for his starring roles in the CBS comedy series The Crazy Ones (2013–2014), the AMC period drama series Mad Men (2013–2014), the CBS drama thriller series Zoo (2015–2017), the CBS All Access psychological thriller series Tell Me a Story (2018–2019), and the HBO superhero limited series Watchmen (2019).

Wolk also had starring roles in the films You Again (2010), For a Good Time, Call... (2012), The Stanford Prison Experiment (2015), and Mercy (2016).

== Early life and education ==
Wolk was born in Farmington Hills, Michigan, the son of Edie, an art teacher, and Robert, who owned a shoe store in nearby Birmingham, Michigan. Wolk is an Ashkenazi Jew who was raised in a Reform Jewish household. During his teenage years, Wolk worked as an emcee at bar and bat mitzvahs. He graduated North Farmington High School in 2003 and from the University of Michigan School of Music, Theatre & Dance in 2007.

== Career ==
In 2008, Wolk landed his first starring television role in Hallmark Hall of Fame's drama film Front of the Class, as Brad Cohen. He subsequently played the title character in the 2009 ABC pilot Solving Charlie. In 2010, Wolk was cast as the lead in the Fox drama series Lone Star, as Robert "Bob" Allen, a Texas con man married to the daughter of one of his targets while simultaneously maintaining a relationship in another town. Fox canceled the series after two episodes.

In 2010, Wolk had a role as Will in the romantic comedy film You Again. He played a presidential speechwriter named Andrew Pierce in Georgetown, a 2011 ABC pilot which did not go to air.

In the fall of 2011, Wolk joined the second season cast of the Showtime dramedy series Shameless, in the recurring role of Adam. The second season premiered January 8, 2012. Wolk played the recurring role of Grant in three episodes of the ABC comedy series Happy Endings, beginning with the first installment on February 8, 2012. In 2012, Wolk starred in the USA Network miniseries Political Animals, co-starring Sigourney Weaver and Ciarán Hinds. Wolk played Douglas Hammond, the "good" son of a former President of the United States (Hinds) and the current Secretary of State (Weaver).

In 2013, Wolk joined the sixth-season cast of the AMC period drama series Mad Men, playing mysterious junior account man Bob Benson. As the season progressed, Benson became one of the most talked-about characters on the show, and Wolk received a Satellite Award nomination. In the 2013–14 television season, Wolk was part of the cast of the CBS sitcom The Crazy Ones, starring Robin Williams and Sarah Michelle Gellar. He played a womanizing creative at the Chicago ad agency headed by Williams and Gellar, his second role as an ad agency worker after Mad Men.

In November 2014, Wolk was cast as the lead in the CBS drama thriller series Zoo, based on the novel by James Patterson and Michael Ledwidge. Zoo premiered in June 2015 and aired for three seasons. Wolk also starred as Craig in the 2014 comedy film Are You Joking?, as Noah Bernstein in the 2014 comedy-drama film There's Always Woodstock, and as Mike Penny in the 2015 drama thriller film The Stanford Prison Experiment. He also starred as Philip in the independent comedy film This Is Happening, which focuses on an estranged brother and sister who go on a road trip to find their runaway grandmother.

In 2016, Wolk starred as Brad in the thriller film Mercy, which was written and directed by Chris Sparling. In 2017, he guest-starred as Craig Heidecker, an innovative young tech billionaire, in multiple episodes of the Showtime drama series Billions. In 2018, Wolk guest-starred as FBI Special Agent Jeff Clayton in the Amazon drama series Goliath. He starred in the first season of the CBS All Access psychological thriller series Tell Me a Story, an anthology series adapting classic fairy tales with a modern horror spin. In late 2018, Wolk was cast as Senator Joe Keene Jr. in the HBO superhero limited series Watchmen, based on the DC Comics series of the same name. The series debuted on October 20, 2019, to universal acclaim.

In 2021, Wolk began to play the lead role of Joe Kimbreau in the NBC drama Ordinary Joe, which is developed and executive-produced by Russel Friend and Garrett Lerner. In February 2024, it was announced that he was cast in an undisclosed role in Sonic the Hedgehog 3.

== Personal life ==
Wolk is on the board of directors of the Brad Cohen Tourette Foundation. From 2009 to 2012, he also volunteered at Camp Twitch and Shout, which is a camp in Winder, Georgia, for children, ages 7 to 17, who have Tourette syndrome.

Wolk is married to Elizabeth Jae Byrd.

== Filmography ==
=== Film ===
Year	Title	Role	Notes
2008	Front of the Class	Brad Cohen	
2010	You Again	Will Olsen	
2012	For a Good Time, Call...	Charlie	
2014	There's Always Woodstock	Noah Bernstein	
2015	The Stanford Prison Experiment	Mike Penny	
2015	This Is Happening	Philip	
2016	Mercy	Brad	
2023	Spinning Gold	Larry Harris	
2023	The Boys in the Boat	Thomas Bolles	
2024	The Luckiest Man in America	Junior	
2024	Sonic the Hedgehog 3	Young Captain Walters	

=== Television ===
Year	Title	Role	Notes
2008	As the World Turns	Sailor	1 episode
2008	Front of the Class	Brad Cohen	Television film
2010	Lone Star	Robert "Bob" Allen	Main role, 5 episodes
2012	Shameless	Adam	3 episodes
2012	Happy Endings	Grant	3 episodes
2012	Political Animals	Douglas Hammond	Miniseries, 6 episodes
2013–2014	The Crazy Ones	Zach Cropper	Main role, 22 episodes
2013–2014	Mad Men	Bob Benson	Recurring role, 12 episodes
2015	Robot Chicken	Del Griffith / Elf (voice)	1 episode
2015–2017	Zoo	Jackson Oz	Main role, 39 episodes
2017	Billions	Craig Heidecker	2 episodes
2018	Goliath	Jeff Clayton	Recurring role, 6 episodes
2018–2019	Tell Me a Story	Jordan Evans	Main role, 10 episodes
2019	Watchmen	Joe Keene Jr.	Miniseries, 6 episodes
2019–present	Harley Quinn	Superman (voice)	Recurring role, 6 episodes
2021–2022	Ordinary Joe	Joe Kimbreau	Main role, 13 episodes
2025	Happy Face	Ben Moore	Main role, 8 episodes
2026	The Shards	Mr. Kellner	Supporting role
2026	Grey's Anatomy	Dr. Seth Norton	Recurring role
2027	Vought Rising †		Recurring role, upcoming series

== Awards and nominations ==
Year	Association	Category	Work	Result
2013	Satellite Awards	Best Supporting Actor – Series, Miniseries or Television Film	Mad Men	Nominated
2013	Gold Derby Awards	Best Drama Guest Actor	Mad Men	Won
