= Greenland (film) =

2020 film by Ric Roman Waugh

- Theatrical release poster
- Directed by: Ric Roman Waugh
- Written by: Chris Sparling
- Produced by: Gerard Butler; Basil Iwanyk; Sébastien Raybaud; Alan Siegel
- Starring: Gerard Butler; Morena Baccarin; Roger Dale Floyd; David Denman; Hope Davis; King Bach; Merrin Dungey; Holt McCallany; Scott Glenn
- Cinematography: Dana Gonzales
- Edited by: Gabriel Fleming
- Music by: David Buckley
- Production companies: Anton; Thunder Road; G-BASE Film Production; Riverstone Pictures
- Distributed by: STXfilms
- Release date: December 18, 2020
- Running time: 119 minutes
- Country: United States
- Language: English
- Budget: $35 million
- Box office: $52.3 million

Greenland is a 2020 American disaster film starring Gerard Butler as the father of a family who must fight for survival as a planet-destroying comet races to Earth. It is directed by Ric Roman Waugh and written by Chris Sparling. The film also stars Morena Baccarin, Roger Dale Floyd, David Denman, Hope Davis, King Bach, Merrin Dungey, and Holt McCallany.

Originally scheduled to be theatrically released in the United States, Greenland was delayed several times due to the COVID-19 pandemic. The film was released domestically by STXfilms, through video on demand on December 18, 2020, and then to streaming on HBO Max and Amazon Prime Video. It was also released theatrically in other territories, beginning with Belgium on July 29, 2020. The film received generally positive reviews. The film grossed $52.3 million worldwide with a production budget of $35 million.

A sequel, Greenland 2: Migration, was released on January 9, 2026.

== Plot ==
Structural engineer John Garrity lives in Atlanta, Georgia, with his estranged wife, Allison, and their diabetic son, Nathan. He is on the way home to watch the near-earth passing of a recently discovered interstellar comet named "Clarke", along with his family and neighbors.

While at the supermarket, John receives an automated DHS message announcing that he and his family have been selected for emergency sheltering. He returns home just as a comet fragment is seen entering the atmosphere on live TV. Previously expected to land in the ocean near Bermuda, the fragment instead strikes Tampa, vaporizing the city along with most of the state. John then receives a call with instructions to head to Robins Air Force Base for an evacuation flight, as Clarke is on a direct collision course to Earth and the impact will cause an extinction-level event in two days. John, Allison, and Nathan pack up and drive away.

The way to the base is clogged by heavy traffic, so the Garritys reverse their car and go via a different route. After they arrive, Nathan's insulin is accidentally left behind in the car. After they are inside the base, John realizes that it is missing and goes back to retrieve it. Meanwhile, Nathan's medical condition is discovered, disqualifying him for sheltering, and Allison stays with him. John returns and boards a plane, but quickly jumps off upon realizing that Allison and Nathan were left behind.

As John exits the base, a panicked mob breaks in, destroying several evacuation planes when gunfire ignites spilled jet fuel. Returning to their car, John finds Allison's note saying they are going to her father's home in Lexington. After finding medical supplies, Allison and Nathan hitch a ride with Ralph and Judy Vento, only for Ralph to kidnap Nathan to use him and their wristbands to board a flight.

John hitch-hikes a ride on a military truck full of people heading towards Canada, planning to get off in Lexington. A passenger named Colin tells him they are headed to Osgoode, Ontario, where private planes are flying to Greenland, believed to be the military evacuation site. Another man attempts to steal John's wristband, causing the truck to crash, killing Colin. John is forced to kill the other man in self-defense.

At another air force base, the Ventos attempt to pose as Nathan's parents, but are arrested when Nathan reveals that he is not their child. Allison and Nathan are reunited shortly after at a nearby FEMA camp in Knoxville.

The following morning, John learns that the largest fragment will hit in approximately 24 hours. Stealing a car, John reaches his father-in-law, Dale's house, and Nathan and Allison arrive shortly after. The family learn about a complex of underground bunkers near Thule Air Base in Greenland, confirming that this is where the evacuees are being sent. Dale chooses to stay behind, bidding farewell to his daughter's family.

John, Allison, and Nathan proceed in Dale's truck. While making steady progress to Osgoode, the family learns over the radio that Clarke's largest fragment, which is 9 miles (14 km) wide, will hit Western Europe and obliterate it. They arrive at the Osgoode airport just in time to board the last flight out. As they reach Greenland, a comet fragment strikes, causing the plane to crash and hit a glacier, killing the pilot. The Garritys and the rest of the passengers flag down a military truck and enter the bunker complex just as the largest fragment enters the atmosphere and hits Earth, devastating civilization along with the world.

Nine months later, the bunker makes radio contact with other survivors around the world. The Garritys and other occupants exit the shelter, as reports come in that the atmosphere is finally clearing, giving the survivors the chance to bring Earth back onto its feet.

== Cast ==
- Gerard Butler as John Garrity, a structural engineer who is selected for emergency sheltering
- Morena Baccarin as Allison Garrity, the wife of John who is working on rebuilding their relationship following a cheating incident
- Roger Dale Floyd as Nathan Garrity, the son of John and Allison
- David Denman as Ralph Vento, a man who tries to pass Nathan as his own when trying to get to the emergency shelter
- Hope Davis as Judy Vento, the wife of Ralph
- King Bach as Colin, a man who John befriends when hitchhiking to Ontario, Canada
- Merrin Dungey as Major Breen, a military figure at Robins Air Force Base
- Holt McCallany as Twin Otter Pilot
- Scott Glenn as Dale, the father of Allison and grandfather of Nathan
- Scott Poythress as Kenny, John and Allison's's friend and neighbor
- Claire Bronson as Debra Jones, a neighbor of John and Allison
- Madison Johnson as Ellie Jones, the daughter of Debra
- Gary Weeks as Ed Pruitt, a neighbor of John and Allison
- Tracey Bonner as Peggy Pruitt, the wife of Ed
- Brandon Quinn as a passenger on a C-17
- Kendrick Cross as a F.E.M.A. Supervisor

== Production ==
=== Development ===
In May 2018, Chris Evans joined the cast of the film, with Neill Blomkamp directing from a screenplay by Chris Sparling. In February 2019, it was announced Blomkamp would no longer direct the film. That same month, Ric Roman Waugh joined the project as director, with Gerard Butler being added to the cast of the film, replacing Blomkamp and Evans respectively, with Butler producing under his G-Base banner. In June 2019, Morena Baccarin joined the cast of the film. In July 2019, Scott Glenn, Andrew Bachelor and Roger Dale Floyd also joined, as did David Denman, in August.

=== Filming ===
Principal photography began in June 2019 and wrapped up on August 16 of the same year in Atlanta.

=== Music ===
Greenland (Original Motion Picture Soundtrack)

Film score by David Buckley
- Released: September 25, 2020
- Length: 55:14
- Label: Varese Sarabande

David Buckley, who previously worked with Waugh on Angel Has Fallen, composed the film's score.

== Release ==
In March 2019, STX Entertainment acquired distribution rights to the film. It was originally scheduled to be theatrically released on June 12, 2020, but was delayed to July 30, 2020, and then August 14, 2020, due to the COVID-19 pandemic. Its domestic release was again delayed on July 24, moving to September 25, 2020. The film's release schedule includes Belgium (July 29), France (August 5), and Scandinavia (August 12). On September 14, it was announced the film's American release has been delayed again, this time to sometime later in 2020.

On September 30, the studio announced the film would be skipping theaters and going to be available to buy via video on demand on October 13, before being made available to rent on October 27. The following day, the studio announced the film had its U.S. pay TV and streaming rights sold to HBO for $20–30 million, who would release it in early 2021 and have it stream on HBO Max and Amazon Prime for the United Kingdom, Canada, and Australia releases. It was later reported the VOD release date had been pushed to December 18. The studio spent an estimated $10 million promoting the film domestically.

Greenland was released on 4K Ultra HD Blu-ray on March 31, 2026.

== Reception ==
=== Box office and VoD ===
Greenland was first released in Belgium, making $73,112 from 55 theaters on its opening weekend. On its first day of release in France, the film made $255,000 with 31,000 tickets sold, 61% ahead of Butler's Olympus Has Fallen (2013) despite fewer theaters and tight COVID-19 restrictions. Overall, it debuted to $1.09 million in the country, with a 10-day international total of $1.3 million. In its third weekend of international release, the film finished first in nine countries and made a total of $2.82 million. In November the film opened in China and Mexico, debuting to $3.4 million and $882,000, respectively; the running global total was $43.1 million.

Upon the film's VOD release in the United States, it was the second-most rented on FandangoNow, and third on Apple TV and Google Play. The film remained near the top of rental charts into February, finishing first at both Google Play and Apple TV. In February 24, IndieWire estimated the film had already netted STX Films $60–80 million in profit, including around $32 million from two million PVOD rentals.

=== Critical response ===
On the review aggregator website Rotten Tomatoes, 78% of 160 critics' reviews are positive. The website's consensus reads: "Beware, comets of Greenland: Gerard Butler is here to protect Earth—and show audiences an improbably entertaining time." On Metacritic, it has a weighted average score of 64 out of 100 based on 25 critics, indicating "generally favorable" reviews. Writing for the Chicago Sun-Times, Richard Roeper gave the film three out of four stars, saying, "Unlike the typical, effects-laden, comet-threatens-the-planet B-movie, Greenland is more in the vein of Steven Spielberg's War of the Worlds, with the scenes of chaos and destruction serving as the backdrop for the story of one family's desperate quest for survival—even when circumstances have ripped them apart." Writing for IndieWire, David Ehrlich gave the film a grade of B and said, "By eschewing spectacle and focusing on the human scale of a crisis, Greenland becomes the rare disaster movie that feels realistic."

Katie Walsh of the Los Angeles Times wrote that "[the film is] not just plausible but recognizable. There's very little otherworldly about this cinematic apocalypse. These are the people, places and, yes, behaviors we know all too well".

Jordan Mintzer of The Hollywood Reporter said "The gritty verisimilitude that the star and director Ric Roman Waugh bring to the table goes a long way in making this B-level blockbuster a timely and guilty pleasure". Chris Hewitt of the Star Tribune called it "capably done".

According to Matthew Monagle of The Austin Chronicle, "Greenland might be a B-movie at heart, but in keeping at least one toe on the ground at all times, the filmmakers craft something that punches well above its weight class".

Among the negative reviews, Ignatiy Vishnevetsky of The A.V. Club compared Greenland to Roland Emmerich's films, while Owen Gleiberman of Variety wrote "A thriller isn't supposed to be a cakewalk; if it were, it wouldn't thrill".

== Sequel ==
In June 2021, it was announced a sequel titled Greenland 2: Migration was in development, and will reportedly center on the Garritys' journey across the ruins of Europe to find a new home while contending with the remnants of Clarke and other dangers. The following month, STX acquired the worldwide distribution rights for the film at 2021 Cannes Film Festival for $75 million, and agreed to give the sequel a $65 million budget. In April 2024, it was announced that filming was scheduled to start in the UK the same month. Greenland 2: Migration was released on January 9, 2026.

== See also ==
- Impact events in fiction
