= Mercy (2016 film) =

- Directed by: Chris Sparling
- Written by: Chris Sparling
- Produced by: Robyn K. Bennett; Andrew D. Corkin; Kyle Franke
- Starring: James Wolk; Caitlin FitzGerald; Tom Lipinski; Dan Ziskie; Michael Godere; Michael Donovan
- Cinematography: Luca Del Puppo
- Edited by: Seth Anderson; Phillip Kimsey
- Music by: Phil Mossman
- Production companies: XYZ Films; Uncorked Productions
- Distributed by: Netflix
- Release date: June 4, 2016 (LA Film Fest)
- Running time: 90 minutes
- Country: United States
- Language: English

Mercy is a 2016 American horror-thriller film written and directed by Chris Sparling. The film had its world premiere at Los Angeles Film Festival on June 4, 2016, and its distribution rights were acquired by Netflix.

== Plot ==
Dr. Turner arrives at the Mitchell household and attempts to convince George to seemingly euthanize his dying wife, Grace. George initially refuses, but takes the drugs. George tells his sons Ronnie and TJ that, as he is the sole beneficiary of Grace's assets, they will inherit the fortune left to Grace from her deceased abusive ex-husband, Bradley, instead of their half-brothers, Travis and Brad, whom they resent. Despite George's warnings, Ronnie tells Travis that George is planning to cut them out of his will. Brad and his girlfriend Melissa arrive at the house to a cold reception.

George, the brothers, and Melissa gather at a bonfire where George reads an entry from Grace's diary after Bradley's death, where she wrote about her contentment with it and the hope that someone else will decide what to do with her assets. Later in the night, George overhears Brad telling Melissa about the euthanasia drugs. After being awoken by sounds of struggling, Brad and Travis investigate an apparent break-in when they hear Melissa screaming. Brad chases Melissa into the woods, while Travis discovers a note left inside the bag holding the drugs. The three reunite and barricade themselves in Grace's bedroom. Brad and Travis argue after Travis insinuates he knows what's happening, but are interrupted when the masked men burn the word "MERCY" onto the lawn. Travis exits the room and attempts to take a motorcycle, but is killed.

Earlier that day, Dr. Turner watches Travis and texts the intruders to meet him. After stealing the euthanasia drugs from Grace's bedroom, George attacked them, but was killed after being shoved down the stairs. TJ was attacked after watching a VHS tape of Grace doing a welcome video for New Life Church. It is revealed that there are three intruders, with one being stabbed by TJ. After Melissa fled into the woods, TJ found her, but was killed by an intruder shortly after. Meanwhile, Ronnie was accidentally killed by an intruder during a scuffle in the bathroom, which woke up Brad.

While Travis left to get the motorcycle, Brad revealed to Melissa that he believes the New Life Church helped commit and cover up the murder of Bradley. After killing Travis, the three masked men meet in the kitchen. A fourth masked man arrives, revealing himself to be Dr. Turner. One of the intruders, Hank, becomes distraught at the events and storms off. Dr. Turner offers the remaining crew the chance to leave, but implores they continue. The next morning, Brad and Melissa leave Grace's room and search the house, only to find several more masked men.

Melissa's morning alarm rings, briefly distracting the intruders. They run, and Brad allows Melissa to be captured after she trips on the stairs. Brad returns to Grace's room to euthanize her. However, Grace instead reawakens, revealing that the euthanasia was actually a cure. The men take Grace out of the home, and Dr. Turner gives Brad a gun, which he uses to commit suicide.

== Cast ==
- James Wolk as Brad
- Caitlin FitzGerald as Melissa
- Tom Lipinski as Travis
- Dan Ziskie as George
- Michael Godere as Ronnie
- Michael Donovan as TJ
- Dion Graham as Dr. Turner
- Constance Barron as Grace

== See also ==
- List of films featuring home invasions
