= David Buckley =

English composer (born 1976)

- Born: 7 June 1976 (age 50); London, England
- Genres: Film score, contemporary classical, rock, ambient, electronic
- Occupation: Composer
- Instruments: Vocals, piano, keyboards, synthesizer
- Years active: 2004–present
- Website: http://davidbuckleymusic.com

David Buckley (born 7 June 1976) is an English composer of film and television scores, based in Santa Monica, California.

== Career ==
Born in London in 1976, Buckley's first involvement with film music was as a cathedral choirboy performing on Peter Gabriel’s score for Martin Scorsese’s The Last Temptation of Christ. He continued his musical education at the University of Cambridge. In 2006, Buckley moved to Los Angeles to collaborate on a number of Harry Gregson-Williams’ scores, including Shrek, Gone Baby Gone, Flushed Away, Arthur Christmas, Prince of Persia: The Sands of Time and The Number 23. In addition to his work for Gregson-Williams, he has written additional music for Danny Elfman on films including American Hustle, Big Eyes and all Fifty Shades movies (including the choral piece "Bliss") and for Hans Zimmer and Rupert Gregson-Williams on Winter's Tale and Wonder Woman.

He has worked with filmmakers including Ridley and Tony Scott, Ben Affleck, Joel Schumacher, Rob Minkoff, Luc Besson, Taylor Hackford and Ric Roman Waugh. Notable film scores include The Town, Jason Bourne, The Nice Guys (with John Ottman), Papillon, The Forbidden Kingdom, Angel Has Fallen, Arctic Dogs, Greenland and Nobody'. He is also the composer for the critically acclaimed Scott Free-produced CBS television series The Good Wife and its spinoff The Good Fight. His music from The Good Wife was prominently featured in the 2015 David O. Russell film Joy.

Buckley was included in BAFTA's list of "Brits to Watch", is the recipient of numerous BMI Awards, and earned an Emmy Award nomination in 2017 for Outstanding Theme Music for his work on The Good Fight.

== Discography ==
=== Film ===
Year	Title	Director	Studio(s)	Notes
2008	The Forbidden Kingdom	Rob Minkoff	Lionsgate; The Weinstein Company	—N/a
2009	Tell-Tale	Michael Cuesta	Scott Free Productions	—N/a
2009	Blood Creek	Joel Schumacher	Lionsgate	—N/a
2010	From Paris with Love	Pierre Morel	Lionsgate	—N/a
2010	In the Land of the Free...	Vadim Jean	Gold Circle Films	Documentary films
2010	The Town	Ben Affleck	Warner Bros. Pictures	Composed with Harry Gregson-Williams
2011	Trespass	Joel Schumacher	Millennium Entertainment	—N/a
2011	Book of Dragons	Steve Hickner	DreamWorks Animation	Short film
2012	ATM	David Brooks	IFC Films	—N/a
2012	Gone	Heitor Dhalia	Summit Entertainment	—N/a
2013	Parker	Taylor Hackford	FilmDistrict	—N/a
2014	Breaking the Bank	Vadim Jean	Black Hangar Studios	—N/a
2016	Grimsby	Louis Leterrier	Columbia Pictures	Composed with Erran Baron Cohen
2016	Jason Bourne	Paul Greengrass	Universal Pictures	Composed with John Powell
2016	The Nice Guys	Shane Black	Warner Bros. Pictures	Composed with John Ottman
2016	The Master	Jon Saunders	Warner Bros. Pictures	Short film
2017	The Boy Downstairs	Sophie Brooks	FilmRise	—N/a
2017	Papillon	Michael Noer	Bleecker Street	—N/a
2019	Angel Has Fallen	Ric Roman Waugh	Lionsgate	—N/a
2019	Arctic Dogs	Aaron Woodley	Entertainment Studios Motion Pictures	—N/a
2020	Greenland	Ric Roman Waugh	STXfilms	—N/a
2020	Unhinged	Derrick Borte	Solstice Studios	—N/a
2021	Nobody	Ilya Naishuller	Universal Pictures	—N/a
2023	Kandahar	Ric Roman Waugh	MBC Studios / Thunder Road / G-BASE	—N/a
2026	Greenland 2: Migration	Ric Roman Waugh	Lionsgate / STXfilms	—N/a
2026	Shelter	Ric Roman Waugh	Black Bear Pictures	—N/a

==== Additional music ====
Year	Title	Director	Studio(s)	Notes
2006	Flushed Away	David Bowers; Sam Fell	Aardman Animations; DreamWorks Animation	Composer of additional music Main score by Harry Gregson-Williams
2007	The Number 23	Joel Schumacher	New Line Cinema	Composer of additional music Main score by Harry Gregson-Williams
2007	Shrek the Third	Chris Miller; Raman Hui	DreamWorks Animation; Pacific Data Images	Composer of additional music Main score by Harry Gregson-Williams
2007	Gone Baby Gone	Ben Affleck	The Ladd Company; Miramax Films	Composer of additional music Main score by Harry Gregson-Williams
2008	Jolene	Dan Ireland	Entertainment One	Composer of additional music Main score by Harry Gregson-Williams
2011	Arthur Christmas	Sarah Smith	Aardman Animations; Columbia Pictures	Composer of additional music Main score by Harry Gregson-Williams
2013	American Hustle	David O. Russell	Annapurna Pictures; Columbia Pictures	Composer of additional music Main score by Danny Elfman
2014	Big Eyes	Tim Burton	The Weinstein Company	Composer of additional music Main score by Danny Elfman
2014	Winter's Tale	Akiva Goldsman	Warner Bros. Pictures	Composer of additional music Main score by Hans Zimmer & Rupert Gregson-Williams
2015	Fifty Shades Of Grey	Sam Taylor-Johnson	Universal Pictures	Composer of additional music Main score by Danny Elfman
2017	Wonder Woman	Patty Jenkins	Warner Bros. Pictures	Composer of additional music Main score by Rupert Gregson-Williams
2017	Fifty Shades Darker	James Foley	Universal Pictures	Composer of additional music Main score by Danny Elfman
2018	Fifty Shades Freed	James Foley	Universal Pictures	Composer of additional music Main score by Danny Elfman

=== Television ===
Year	Title	Original channel(s) aired	Notes
2010–15	The Good Wife	CBS	
2012	Coma	A&E	Miniseries
2013	Killing Lincoln	National Geographic Channel	Television film
2015	Proof	TNT	
2016	Mercy Street	PBS	Miniseries
2016	Killing Reagan	National Geographic Channel	Television film
2016	BrainDead	CBS	
2017–19	The Good Fight	CBS	Nominated – Emmy Award for Outstanding Theme Music (2017)
2017–18	The Gifted	Fox	with John Ottman
2019–24	Evil	CBS	
2022–25	The Sandman	Netflix	

=== Video games ===
Year	Title	Developer(s)	Publisher(s)	Notes
2008	Metal Gear Solid 4	Konami	Konami	Additional Music
2010	Shrek Forever After	XPEC	Activision	
2013	Call of Duty: Ghosts	Infinity Ward; Raven Software; Neversoft	Activision	
2015	Batman: Arkham Knight	Rocksteady Studios	Warner Bros. Interactive Entertainment	Composed with Nick Arundel
2016	Batman: Arkham VR	Rocksteady Studios	Warner Bros. Interactive Entertainment	Composed with Nick Arundel
