= Endless (2020 film) =

2020 film

- Film poster
- Directed by: Scott Speer
- Written by: Andre Case; Oneil Sharma
- Produced by: Gabriela Bacher; Kevin DeWalt; Sean Finegan; Basil Iwanyk; Erica Lee
- Starring: Alexandra Shipp; Nicholas Hamilton; Famke Janssen
- Cinematography: Frank Borin; Mark Dobrescu
- Edited by: Sean Valla
- Music by: Todd Bryanton; Nik Freitas
- Production companies: Summerstorm Entertainment; Film House Germany; Thunder Road Films; Minds Eye Entertainment; Ingenious Media
- Distributed by: Quiver Distribution
- Release date: August 14, 2020
- Running time: 94 minutes
- Country: United States
- Language: English
- Box office: $944,761

Endless is a 2020 American fantasy romantic drama film directed by Scott Speer and starring Alexandra Shipp and Nicholas Hamilton.

== Plot ==
Riley (Alexandra Shipp) and Chris (Nicholas Hamilton) are two high school graduates madly in love, but a tragic car accident separates them. She blames herself for the untimely death of her boyfriend while he remains stuck in limbo. Miraculously, the two find a way to reconnect.

== Cast ==
- Alexandra Shipp as Riley Jean Stanheight
- Nicholas Hamilton as Chris Douglas
- DeRon Horton as Jordan
- Famke Janssen as Lee Douglas
- Eddie Ramos as Nate
- Zoe Belkin as Julia
- Ian Tracey as Richard
- Catherine Lough Haggquist as Helen
- Aaron Pearl as Chris's Father
- Barbara Meier as Teri

== Release ==
The film was released in select theaters and on VOD by Quiver Distribution on August 14, 2020.

== Reception ==
=== Box office ===
Endless grossed $0 in North America and $944,761 worldwide.

=== Critical response ===
The film holds an 18% approval rating on review aggregator Rotten Tomatoes, based on 28 reviews, with an average of 4.4/10. The website's critical consensus reads, "While it hopes to make viewers swoon over a bond that defies death, all but the most passionate fans of YA romance may struggle to arouse even puppy love for Endless." On Metacritic, it holds a rating of 27 out of 100, based on 5 critics, indicating "generally unfavorable" reviews.

Tara McNamara of Common Sense Media awarded the film two stars out of five. Tomris Laffly of RogerEbert.com awarded the film one star. Kate Erbland of IndieWire graded the film a D+. Lisa Kennedy of Variety gave the film a positive review and wrote, "But amiable leads Alexandra Shipp and Nicholas Hamilton — along with a thoughtfully in-sync supporting cast — keep things unfolding in a kind-hearted place when the screenplay could have easily marooned the audience in a copycat purgatory." John DeFore of The Hollywood Reporter gave the film a negative review and wrote, "For only the most undiscriminating YA romantics."
