= ATM (film) =

- Theatrical release poster
- Directed by: David Brooks
- Screenplay by: Chris Sparling
- Story by: Chris Sparling; Ron Tippe
- Produced by: Paul Brooks; Peter Safran
- Starring: Brian Geraghty; Alice Eve; Josh Peck; Mike O'Brian
- Cinematography: Bengt Jonsson
- Edited by: David Brooks
- Music by: David Buckley
- Production companies: Gold Circle Films; Buffalo Gal Pictures; The Safran Company
- Distributed by: IFC Midnight (United States); Lionsgate (International)
- Release date: April 6, 2012
- Running time: 90 minutes
- Country: United States
- Language: English
- Budget: $3 million
- Box office: $1 million

ATM is a 2012 American horror thriller film directed by David Brooks. The film stars Brian Geraghty, Alice Eve, and Josh Peck. Its plot centers on three people who become trapped in an ATM booth by a psychopathic hooded figure.

== Plot ==
David Hargrove is a stockbroker having trouble asking out his co-worker Emily Brandt. At a Christmas party, he offers to drive her home. Reluctantly, he also agrees to drive home his drunk co-worker Corey Thompson. During the ride, Corey has David stop at a local ATM booth, needing to withdraw cash to buy pizza.

When Corey encounters card problems inside the booth, David and Emily join him inside. The three then spot a hooded figure in a parka coat with the hood up lurking outside in the parking lot. David and Emily suspect the figure to be a robber and discover he cannot enter the booth without an ATM card. When the hooded man kills a dog walker, they attempt to phone the police, but Corey lost his phone at the party, David's phone battery is dead, and Emily's phone is in her purse in the car. The hooded man shuts down the booth's heater. David opts to negotiate their safety by giving the killer $500, earrings, and a watch. He uses this to escape to his car, where he finds out that the vehicle's ignition wires have been severed, and the car cannot start. He attempts to call 911, but is attacked by the man. He accidentally drops Emily's phone as he escapes.

Emily uses her lipstick to write "HELP" on the booth's window to attract attention. The three of them are freezing when a security guard locates them. When the guard tries to call the cops, the hooded man beats him to death using a tire iron from David's car trunk. When a man with a similar coat enters the booth, he is killed by David and Corey, but is revealed to be an innocent janitor. Frustrated, Corey leaves, ends up hitting a line of wire, falls, and gets stabbed by the hooded man.

After several hours, David and Emily realize Corey is still alive. They retrieve him from outside, narrowly managing to return to the booth before the hooded man can get to them. The man blocks the booth door with David's car and tries to freeze them to death by filling the booth with cold water. Corey dies of blood loss and hypothermia. David lifts Emily on his shoulders to trigger the fire sprinkler system alarm but he slips, causing Emily to fall and fatally hits her head.

The hooded man slams David's car into the booth. Angered, David improvises a Molotov cocktail and throws it at the killer but the figure he sets ablaze turns out to be the dead guard. The police arrive but arrest David as the hooded man hides himself in the crowd. As David is driven away, he sees many figures wearing parkas in the crowd. The police recover surveillance recordings of the events in the ATM booth, but the killer had planned his actions so as not to appear in the footage, framing David for his crimes. In the final scene, the hooded man returns to his headquarters, where he begins to map out similar attacks on other ATMs.

== Cast ==
- Brian Geraghty as David Hargrove, a stockbroker who seems to have trouble with work, especially when a phone call with his customer "Mr. Dean" ended
- Alice Eve as Emily Brandt, David's love-interest and co-worker
- Josh Peck as Corey Thompson, David's lazy best friend and other co-worker
- Mike O'Brian as The Man
- Robert Huculak as Robert
- Ernesto Griffith as Security Guard
- Bryan Clark as Jerry
- Daniel De Jaeger as Luke
- Omar Khan as Christian
- Aaron Hughes as Patrolman
- Will Woytowich as Sargent
- Glen Thompson as Harold

== Production ==
In February 2010, it was announced Peter Safran and Gold Circle Films would produce ATM from a spec script by Chris Sparling with David Brooks set to make his feature debut. Safran had previously produced the Sparling penned Buried to great success.

Filming began September 2010 in Winnipeg, Manitoba. Actress Margarita Levieva was set to play the female lead before being replaced by Alice Eve.

== Reception ==
On the review aggregator website Rotten Tomatoes, the film has a 12% approval rating, based on 26 reviews with an average rating of 4.06/10. Metacritic, which uses a weighted average, assigned the film a score of 34 out of 100, based on 10 critics, indicating "generally unfavorable" reviews.

== Release ==
The film was released to video on demand services such as Comcast and Zune on March 6, 2012. On July 31, 2012, the film was released on DVD and Blu-ray. Both formats feature the 90-minute R-rated version of the film as well as an 85-minute unrated Director's cut. They also both include a behind-the-scenes featurette and the trailer.
