= The Kellys =

- Directed by: Brad Peyton
- Written by: Brad Peyton; Tze Chun
- Produced by: Basil Iwanyk; Erica Lee
- Starring: Arnold Schwarzenegger; Liam Hemsworth; Kelsey Asbille; Abby Elliott; Geena Davis
- Production company: Thunder Road Films
- Distributed by: Amazon MGM Studios
- Country: United States
- Language: English

The Kellys is an upcoming American action film co-written and directed by Brad Peyton. It stars Arnold Schwarzenegger, Liam Hemsworth, Kelsey Asbille, Abby Elliott, and Geena Davis.

== Cast ==
- Arnold Schwarzenegger
- Liam Hemsworth
- Kelsey Asbille
- Abby Elliott
- Geena Davis
- Michael Biehn
- Noomi Rapace
- Laz Alonso
- Ron Funches
- Roland Møller
- Dan Fogler

== Production ==
Principal photography began in June 2026, in Budapest on an action film directed by Brad Peyton and co-written by Tze Chun, with Arnold Schwarzenegger and Liam Hemsworth starring in the lead roles. Amazon MGM Studios acquired the distribution rights. Kelsey Asbille, Abby Elliott, and Geena Davis also joined the cast that same month. Noomi Rapace, Michael Biehn, Laz Alonso, Ron Funches, Roland Møller, and Dan Fogler were added a month later.
