= The Town (soundtrack) =

The Town (Original Motion Picture Soundtrack)

Film score by Harry Gregson-Williams and David Buckley
- Released: September 14, 2010
- Recorded: 2010
- Genre: Film score
- Length: 41:52
- Label: WaterTower; Silva Screen
- Producer: Harry Gregson-Williams; David Buckley

Harry Gregson-Williams chronology
Twelve (2010)	The Town (2010)	Unstoppable (2010)

David Buckley chronology
From Paris with Love (2010)	The Town (2010)	Book of Dragons (2011)

The Town (Original Motion Picture Soundtrack) is the film score to the 2010 film The Town directed by Ben Affleck, who also stars in the lead role alongside Rebecca Hall, Jon Hamm, Jeremy Renner, Blake Lively, Titus Welliver, Pete Postlethwaite, Chris Cooper and Slaine. The film score is composed by Harry Gregson-Williams and David Buckley and released through WaterTower Music and Silva Screen Records label on September 14, 2010.

== Background ==
Harry Gregson-Williams composed the film score in his second collaboration with Affleck after Gone Baby Gone (2007), while David Buckley served as the co-composer. Much of the score was written in early-2010, however, by July 2010, with the post-production being incomplete, Gregson-Williams had written around an hour of score and with few of them were excluded to suit the final edit. The final score album consisted of 16 cues with a 41-minute duration.

== Reception ==
Filmtracks wrote "The electronic techniques utilized here are beyond the days of their intelligent usefulness, especially in an album presentation, and Gregson-Williams and Buckley fail to adapt the thematic base of the score into these suspense cues with any of the convincing intrigue that a film like this deserves" calling it "a frustratingly underachieving and generic score." William Ruhlmann of AllMusic wrote "This is music to keep an audience on the edge of its seat, as expressed on a soundtrack album listeners will be able to use to test their woofers." A reviewer from ReadJunk described it "an okay score from Harry Gregson-Williams and David Buckley but could have been better". Michael Rechtshaffen of The Hollywood Reporter wrote "The treacly score by Harry Gregson-Williams and David Buckley, on the other hand, tends to distract rather than enhance." Justin Chang of Variety and Lee Marshal of Screen International called it "lenient" and "distracting". A. O. Scott of The New York Times wrote "the main attraction is the blaring music of those accents."

== Track listing ==
No.	Title	Length
1.	"Charlestown"	02:18
2.	"Bank Attack"	03:38
3.	"Doug Reflects"	01:53
4.	"FBI Show & Tell"	01:48
5.	"OxyContin"	02:09
6.	"Healing and Stealing"	03:12
7.	"Nuns with Guns"	03:40
8.	"The Necklace"	02:19
9.	"The Wreath"	01:24
10.	"Cathedral of Boston"	02:28
11.	"Fenway"	03:09
12.	"Who Called 911?"	03:07
13.	"Making the Switch"	02:39
14.	"Sunny Days"	02:27
15.	"Leaving"	02:54
16.	"The Letter"	02:47
Total length:		41:52

== Personnel ==
Credits adapted from liner notes:

- Music composer and producer – David Buckley, Harry Gregson-Williams
- Music programming – Anthony Lledo, Justin Burnett
- Orchestrators – Halli Cauthery, Jennifer Hammond, Ladd McIntosh
- Concertmaster – Endre Granat
- Music compiler – Slamm Andrews
- Technical engineer – Costa Kotselas
- Recording and mixing – Malcolm Luker
- Mixing assistance – Jamie Luker
- Mastering – Rick Clark
- Score editor – Adam Smalley
- Assistant score editor – Meri Gavin, Scott Johnson
- Executive producer – David Stoner, Reynold D'Silva
- Musicians' contractor – Peter Rotter
- Album coordinator – Pete Compton
- Score coordinator – Gretchen O'Neal
- Artwork – Robert Croucher
- Music business and legal affairs – Jaimie Roberts, Lisa Margolis
- Executive in charge of music for Warner Bros. Pictures – Carter Armstrong, Paul Broucek
- Executive in charge of music for WaterTower – Jason Linn

Instruments

- Bass – Bruce Morgenthaler, Christian Kollgaard, David Parmeter, Drew D. Dembowski, Michael Valerio, Oscar Hidalgo, Nico Carmine Abondolo
- Cello – Andrew T. Shulman, Antony Cooke, Aarmen Ksajikian, Cecelia Tsan, Christina Soule, Christine Ermacoff, David Speltz, Dennis Karmazyn, Erika Duke-Kirkpatrick, George Kim Scholes, Paula Hochhalter, Timothy Landauer, Steve Erdody
- Electric cello – Martin Tillman
- Electric violin – Hugh Marsh
- Guitar – Anthony Lledo, Heitor Pereira, Tony Morales
- Percussion – Brian Kilgore, Marvin B. Gordy III, Satnam Ramgotra, Wade Culbreath
- Piano – Harry Gregson-Williams
- Solo violin – Lili Haydn
- Viola – Alma L. Fernandez, Andrew Duckles, Darrin Mc Cann, David F. Walther, Denyse N. Buffum, Jennie Hansen, Luke A. Maurer, Maria Newman, Marlow Fisher, Matthew Funes, Pamela Jacobsen, Robert Berg, Roland Kato, Shawn Mann, Victoria Miskolczy
- Viola – Brian Dembow
- Violin – Alyssa Park, Bruce Dukov, Eun-Mee Ahn, Irina Voloshina, Jacqueline Brand, Josefina Vergara, Katia Popov, Lisa M. Sutton, Nataalie Leggett, Nina Evtuhov, Phillip Levy, Rafael Rishik, Roberto Cani, Roger Wilkie, Sarah Thornblade, Serena Mc Kinney, Shalini Vijayan, Tamara Hatwan, Tereza L. Stanislav, Julie Ann Gigante, Lili Haydn
