= Ordinary Joe =

American drama television series (2021–2022)

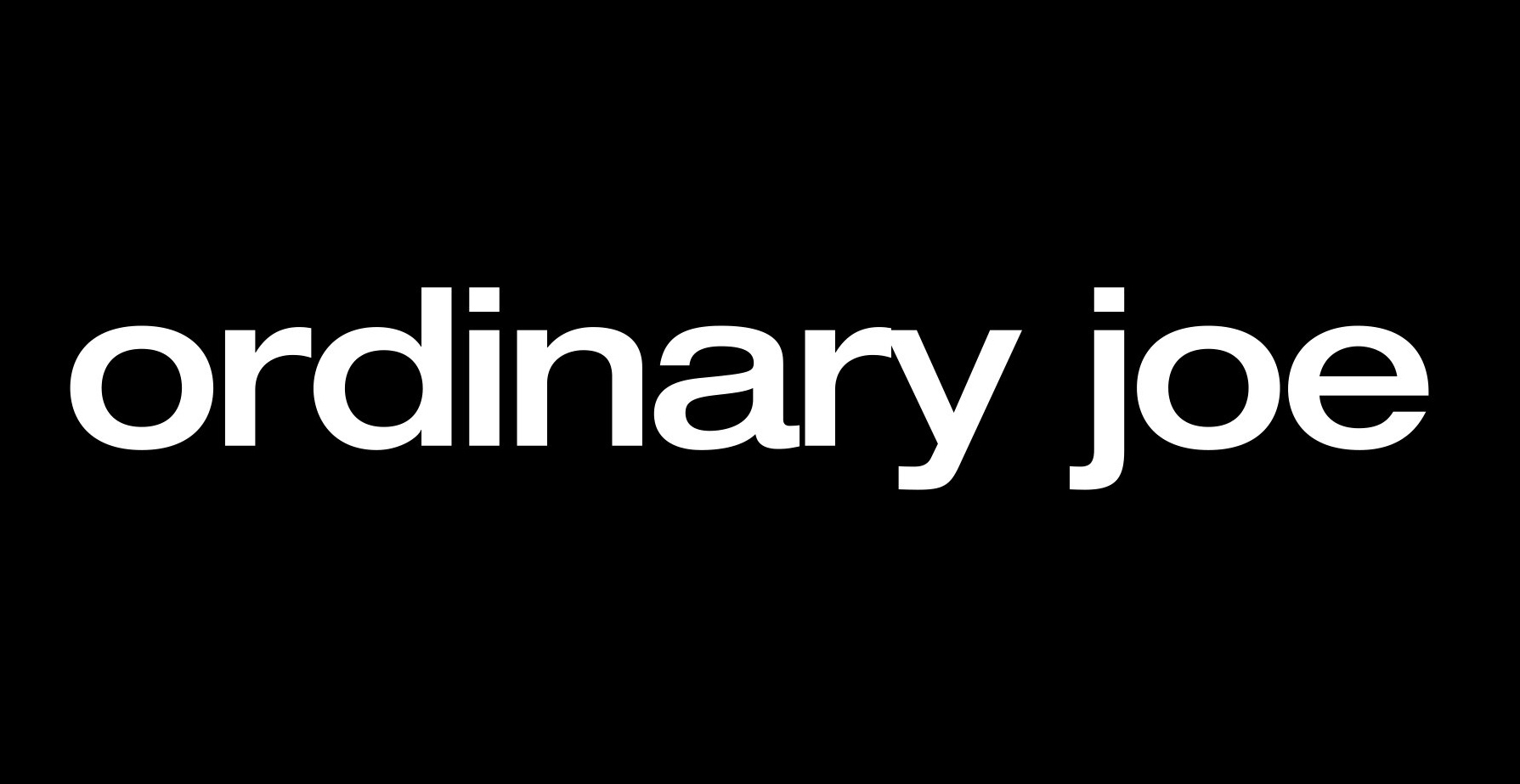
- Genre: Drama
- Created by: Matt Reeves
- Based on: Format by Caleb Ranson
- Developed by: Russel Friend & Garrett Lerner
- Starring: James Wolk; Natalie Martinez; Elizabeth Lail; Charlie Barnett
- Composer: James S. Levine
- Country of origin: United States
- Original language: English
- No. of seasons: 1
- No. of episodes: 13

Production
- Executive producers: Adam Davidson; Howard Klein; Matt Reeves; Rafi Crohn; Adam Kassan; Russel Friend; Garrett Lerner; Chris Koch
- Producers: Jason Roberts; Jessica Badenoch; Brandon Lambdin
- Cinematography: Patrick Murguia; G. Magni Ágústsson
- Editors: Colin Patton; David Cook
- Camera setup: Single-camera
- Running time: 43 minutes
- Production companies: Friend & Lerner Productions; 3 Arts Entertainment; 6th & Idaho; Universal Television; 20th Television

Original release
- Network: NBC
- Release: September 20, 2021 – January 24, 2022

Ordinary Joe is an American drama television series that ran from September 20, 2021 to January 24, 2022 on NBC. The series, produced by 20th Television and Universal Television, is co-developed and co-executive produced by Garrett Lerner and Russel Friend. James Wolk plays the title role. In March 2022, the series was canceled after one season.

== Premise ==
The series centers on Joe Kimbreau as he makes a pivotal, life-changing decision at his graduation from Syracuse University. The show follows him on three parallel timelines, starting ten years after his graduation: as a police officer, following in his father's footsteps; as a music star, following his passion; and as a nurse, after he marries his college sweetheart.

== Cast and characters ==
=== Main ===
- James Wolk as Joe Kimbreau, a man whose one fateful choice on the day of his college graduation has profound effects on who he becomes ten years later:
  - Musician Joe: a famous musician who is married to Amy.
  - Nurse Joe: a mild-mannered nurse who is married to Jenny, with whom Joe shares a son, Christopher.
  - Officer Joe: A heroic police officer who is reunited with Amy after ten years.
- Natalie Martinez as Amy Kindelán, whom Joe meets on the day of his graduation: she is married to Joe, and about to launch a political career, in the "Musician Joe" timeline; she is married to Eric in the "Nurse Joe" timeline; and she is working for Congressman Diaz when Joe reenters her life after ten years in the "Officer Joe" timeline.
- Elizabeth Lail as Jenny Banks, Joe's college sweetheart: in the "Musician Joe" timeline, she is a high-powered attorney who reveals to Joe that she put their son up for adoption ten years before; in the "Nurse Joe" timeline, she is a paralegal who is married to Joe, but initially estranged from him, and together they are raising their son Christopher; and in the "Officer Joe" timeline, she is an assistant district attorney who is keeping the existence of their son with Joe secret from him.
- Charlie Barnett as Eric Payne, Joe's best friend: he is single and managing Joe in the "Musician Joe" timeline; he is a chef and is married to Amy in the "Nurse Joe" timeline; and he runs a pizza place and is married to Mallory in the "Officer Joe" timeline.

=== Recurring ===
- David Warshofsky as Frank Kimbreau, Joe's uncle, who in the "Officer Joe" timeline is an NYPD detective. In the "Musician Joe" timeline, he has become Joe's head of security. In the "Nurse Joe" timeline, he has become a homeless drunk, estranged from most of his family.
- Anne Ramsay as Gwen Kimbreau, Joe's mother
- Adam Rodriguez as Bobby Diaz, a United States congressman who aspires to higher office
- John Gluck as Joe and Jenny's son with muscular dystrophy, who was given a different name in each timeline:
  - Christopher ("Nurse Joe" timeline), cared for by a married Joe and Jenny.
  - Lucas ("Officer Joe" timeline), raised by Jenny and her husband.
  - Zeke ("Musician Joe" timeline), given up for adoption by Jenny years previously.
- Joe Carroll as Ray, Jenny's husband in the "Officer Joe" timeline
- Gabrielle Byndloss as Mallory, Eric's wife in the "Officer Joe" timeline
- Jason Burkey as Darren, Jenny's husband in the "Musician Joe" timeline
- Jack Coleman as Dr. Douglas Banks, Jenny's father
- Christine Adams as Regina Diaz, Bobby's wife

=== Notable guest cast ===
- David Paluck as Christopher Kimbreau Sr., Joe's police officer father who died on 9/11 (in "Requiem", "The Letter")
- Wynn Everett as Celeste Kimbreau, Joe's older sister (in "The Letter", "Thankful")
- Maurice P. Kerry as Officer Gary Winnick, saved by Joe's father on 9/11 (in "The Letter")

== Episodes ==
No.	Title	Directed by	Written by	Original release date	Prod. code	U.S viewers (millions)
1	"Way Leads on to Way"	Adam Davidson	Teleplay by : Matt Reeves and Russel Friend & Garrett Lerner; Television story by : Matt Reeves	September 20, 2021	1DGT01	3.85
Joe Kimbreau graduates from Syracuse University and finds himself torn between three potential choices of how to celebrate. He can accompany his family to dinner, which leads to him following in his father's footsteps and becoming a police officer; go with his girlfriend Jenny to the beach, ultimately marrying her and becoming a nurse; or ask out an attractive fellow graduate named Amy, which results in the two marrying and Joe becoming a successful musician. The story picks up ten years later, splitting into three separate timelines depending on his decision. Nurse Joe helps treat Congressman Bobby Diaz, who was shot at a rally. Joe's marriage to Jenny, a paralegal, sufferes from the strain of them both prioritizing work to provide for their wheelchair-using son Christopher. Joe's best friend Eric is happily married to Amy. Jenny files for divorce, but Joe intends to change her mind in the forty days he has to respond. Joe and Jenny dance together at a ten-year reunion. Musician Joe's marriage to Amy is strained because they have had multiple miscarriages. When Diaz is diagnosed with Parkinson's disease, he endorses Amy, his campaign manager, to replace him on the ballot, upsetting Joe, who wants to be a father. Amy refuses to attend the reunion, so Joe goes alone, where Jenny, now a law partner, tells Joe she was pregnant with his child at graduation and put the baby up for adoption. Joe vows to find and meet his son. Officer Joe saves Diaz from the gunman by shooting him and is celebrated as a hero. Joe reconnects with Amy while investigating the shooter and they attend the reunion together. He encounters Jenny, who has become an assistant district attorney and is raising her disabled son Lucas—the same child as Christopher.
2	"Requiem"	Chris Koch	Russel Friend & Garrett Lerner	September 27, 2021	1DGT02	2.69
On the upcoming 20th commemoration ceremony for 9/11, Joe remembers his late father. Joe blames himself for his father's death, as Joe turned down a chance to go to a football game in Denver in favor of practicing with his band. As a result, his father went to work on 9/11 and died in the line of duty. Nurse Joe, following Eric and Amy's advice, takes Jenny out on a date, during which she asks him to bring Christopher to the commemoration. She tells Joe that, if he's serious about repairing their relationship, he needs to start dealing with his grief. Joe musters the courage to attend the ceremony and takes part in the reading of victims' names. Jenny learns that her firm will pay for her to return to college and finish her degree, allowing her to finally become a lawyer--but it requires her to move to Atlanta. Musician Joe asks Frank, his head of security, to find his son. Jenny discourages Joe's search, fearing what might happen if her husband learns she had a child out of wedlock. Amy accepts Diaz's offer to run in his place and tells Joe she is content with them not having children. Joe then calls Frank, telling him to do whatever it takes to find his son's adoptive parents. Officer Joe is promoted to detective, with Frank as his training officer; Joe's first case is investigating Diaz's shooting. Joe learns the shooter, Wayne Coleman, wanted "revenge" on Diaz. The investigation also forces him to work with Jenny, whose husband is concerned that Joe might discover he is Lucas' biological father. Amy uses her connections to get Joe's father's badge number assigned to Joe and they go on a date. Unbeknownst to Joe, Amy is also in a relationship with Diaz.
3	"Happy Birthday Jenny"	Peter Sollett	Ian Deitchman & Kristin Robinson	October 4, 2021	1DGT03	2.63
While helping Diaz with his physical therapy, Nurse Joe notices a tremor in his hand. He asks his boss Dr. Douglas Banks, who is Jenny's father, to order an MRI but, when Dr. Banks refuses (and criticizes Joe for the state of his marriage), Joe forges his signature on the order. Eric gets Joe a vacation in Canada for Jenny's birthday, but Jenny tells Joe to cancel the trip since she doesn't want to leave Christopher's side. Joe and his son make a special cake for her party and, when Joe reveals that he is willing to pay for couples' counseling, Jenny decides to turn down her firm's offer. Musician Joe's growing obsession with finding his son begins to drive a wedge between him and Amy. After learning that his name is not on the birth certificate Jenny filed (preventing him from learning who adopted his child), Joe deliberately skips out on a commitment to introduce his wife at her first campaign rally, forcing Diaz to step in at the last second. Instead, he goes to see Jenny at her birthday party and threatens to reveal her secret unless she agrees to help him. Arriving late to the rally, Joe watches Amy give a heartwarming, unscripted speech and celebrate with Diaz. Officer Joe invites Amy to dinner with his family, not knowing that Amy only accepted his invitation because Diaz kicked her out for the evening to keep his wife from finding out about their affair. After dinner, the two go upstairs to Joe's room and share a kiss. Jenny steps out of her own party to take a work call and learns that Coleman died during surgery. She notifies Joe, who is distraught over the realization that his bullet killed Coleman.
4	"Shooting Star"	Chris Koch	Simran Baidwan	October 11, 2021	1DGT04	2.70
Nurse Joe and Jenny start couples therapy and Joe learns of Jenny's opportunity to attend law school in Atlanta. This leads to a fight where Joe accuses Jenny of pitying him for giving up his dream of music to help raise their son. A conversation with Chris, however, makes Joe realize that he is happy with his life and family and he proposes moving the family to Atlanta so Jenny can still pursue her dream. Officer Joe is brought before a shooting board after Coleman's death. The shooting is ruled as having followed procedure, but Joe is ordered to complete therapy and remain on desk duty until he does. Amy breaks things off with Diaz and takes Joe on a date at a community center garden, where Joe has a panic attack. Later, Diaz offers Joe a job with his security team and then reveals his affair with Amy. Shortly after, Jenny informs Joe that Coleman's sister was an intern for Diaz who may have also engaged in an affair with him. Musician Joe is told by Frank where to find his son, Zeke, and Joe shares the information with Jenny. Amy continues to work on her campaign and is surprised by an invitation to a Democratic National Committee event with Diaz. While she is in DC, Joe and Jenny take a road trip to see Zeke. The two stop at an old favorite restaurant and the owner, an old friend, assumes they are married, an assumption neither corrects. After watching Zeke's adoptive father pick him up from school, Joe and Jenny drive home. Jenny tells Joe to wish on a shooting star and Joe wishes he could have held his son.
5	"Mask On Mask Off"	S. J. Main Muñoz	Abdi Nazemian	October 18, 2021	1DGT05	2.43
This episode is centered around Halloween in all three timelines. Nurse Joe has decided to move to Atlanta to keep the family together. Chris puts together a list of people to whom he wants to say goodbye. He then sings backup for a friend's school musical audition and ends up winning the lead. Joe is helping Bobby with physical therapy, who asks if Joe is available for private work. Joe's mom turns the farewell into a surprise party, where Chris gets to wear his desired Mars Rover costume, but then Jenny heads for Atlanta. Officer Joe confronts Amy about her affair with Bobby and tells her to talk to Jenny, the Assistant District Attorney. Doing so shows Amy that she was not the only office worker with whom Bobby had an affair. She roots through his files after hours and discovers a copy of a check sent to one of his previous lovers...a woman who died later. She turns the check over to Joe. Musician Joe is haunted by his trip to see his biological son. He wants to help him, but can't find the right time to tell Amy about it. His travel and money withdrawals serve as red flags in Amy's Congressional vetting process and Bobby brings them up to her. The revelations shake her enough that they end up sleeping together. Joe dons a costume and talks to his son for a moment, just as Joe's donation (a handicapped-capable minivan) is donated.
6	"Always Do the Right Thing"	Chris Koch	Maya Dunbar	October 25, 2021	1DGT06	2.44
This episode centers around major life events for Congressman Bobby Diaz. Nurse Joe is struggling getting Christopher ready for school by himself, making him late for his first physical therapy appointment with Bobby, who has doubts about his recovery chances. Chris has to watch the class hamster over night, which he sees as a way to talk with the girl he likes, who has it next. They lose the hamster, but replace it with another animal. Chris tells Congressman Diaz to stay in his job as long as he can. Jenny and Joe talk, sharing their challenges. Uncle Frank returns; in this timeline, he's become homeless. Officer Joe and Amy discuss what happens next with the evidence she found. Later, Joe's Uncle Frank comes by the office and seems friendly with Bobby, scaring Amy. She finds out that Joe turned the check over to Uncle Frank. Joe confronts Frank and finds out he owed the Congressman a favor. Jenny convinces Joe to turn over the photo he took of the check, leading to Diaz's arrest. Uncle Frank starts to drink again, estranging Joe. Musician Joe finds Zeke on social media and starts interacting with him, creating a viral video. Jenny tells Joe to stop. In preparation for a major campaign rally, the idea comes up to bring Zeke in for PR purposes, but Joe says no because of Jenny's request. Joe tells Amy about Jenny and Zeke, magnifying her guilt at having slept with Bobby because of Joe's suspected affair. Joe performs at Amy's rally, but the same shooter Officer Joe shot in episode 1 wounds Amy and kills Bobby.
7	"The Letter"	Peter Hedges	Peter Hedges	November 1, 2021	1DGT07	2.22
The rest of graduation day and part of the next are covered for all three timelines with the common theme of a letter that Joe's Dad wrote to him. Nurse Joe goes to Jenny's party (missing the party his family was throwing for him and an audition opportunity) and discovers that she's pregnant. Despite resistance from her family, he proposes and she says yes. Officer Joe goes to his family party, repeatedly ignoring calls from Jenny. He plays a classical song for his mother's friend, hears a story from Officer Winnick, someone who's alive thanks to Joe's father, and eventually decides to explore the police academy. Musician Joe skips the party to go out with Amy and the two of them convince each other to take risks: Joe to play Billy Joel at a classical audition and Amy to press for an interview despite the position being filled. After an amazing day, they end up busking for money on a corner. Jenny finds out where Joe is and comes to see him, but drives away when she sees the scene.
8	"Reset"	Natalia Leite	Sylvia Batey Alcalá	November 15, 2021	1DGT08	2.04
Nurse Joe tries to take care of his now-returned Uncle Frank who's suffering from long-term alcoholism. Uncle Frank worries about Christopher's condition and wants to visit him more. To do so, he accepts an apology and help from Jenny's dad. Jenny has trouble dividing her attention at law school and doesn't get support when she seeks it. Officer Joe faces fallout due to arresting a sitting congressman. Uncle Frank is put on suspension and Amy gets harassed by law enforcement and angry Diaz fans. Based on his counselor's advice, Joe and Amy reset their relationship and try to start over. Amy tells Joe about a legal run-in she had in the past. Musician Joe is concerned that Amy is not giving herself time to grieve after Bobby Diaz's assassination. Joe flies Amy's parents in to support her. The governor offers Amy Bobby's seat but, after the dead man's watch appears, exposing their affair, complications arise for both Amy's position and her marriage.
9	"Thankful"	Shaz Bennett	Joelle Garfinkel	November 22, 2021	1DGT09	2.15
Nurse Joe hosts his family and an interesting prospective new in-home assistant for Thanksgiving. Jenny calls and says she can't make it because she's been asked by a professor to help with a case. Officer Joe (who's now back on the beat, as he requested) asks Amy to help his mother cook. Tensions rise at Thanksgiving with a suspended Uncle Frank and Joe's sister sharing their hurt feelings. Joe and Amy leave and Joe gets a call to a fire in his new neighborhood. Musician Joe is trying to work through his feelings of betrayal, but his mother gets a feeling that something is up at Thanksgiving dinner. Everything comes to a head when he tries to perform at Amy's fundraiser. Amy gets a call saying that she's pregnant.
10	"Snow Globe"	Chris Koch	Laura Snow	January 3, 2022	1DGT10	1.41
All three timelines build to a concert honoring Joe's mother's work founding a choir after 9/11. Joe performs at all of them and his son is present at all of them. Nurse Joe starts working to make adaptive clothing for children facing the same challenges as his son. Jenny faces further complications both in her work and due to being separated from her family. Officer Joe is recovering from injuries sustained in a fire rescue. Jenny and her husband contact him because their son (Joe's biological son) requires surgery and parent-donated blood. Joe tells his mother that she's a grandmother. Musician Joe and Jenny get word that their son wants to meet them. This means Jenny has to open up to her husband about her past, which doesn't go well. Zeke asks why he was put up for adoption. Amy tells Joe that she's pregnant.
11	"Calling an Audible"	Chris Koch	Simran Baidwan & Ian Deitchman & Kristin Robinson	January 10, 2022	1DGT11	1.45
A New York Giants game serves as the centerpiece of this episode, with Joe and his son watching the game in varying situations. Nurse Joe watches the game while at a trade show to exhibit his new "Zipper Pants" adaptive clothing. Things go slow at first, but his son meets a similarly-challenged girl and her father is a department store buyer who expresses interest. Jenny makes a breakthrough in her case, but she and Joe are too busy for couples therapy. Officer Joe and Amy are invited to watch the game by Jenny and her husband, who's nervous about having Joe get close to his biological son. On the surface, things seem to go well, but Joe's interactions with his son make Jenny's husband more anxious. Amy tells Joe that she can't have children. Musician Joe has become more impulsive after hearing the news of Amy's pregnancy. He's shut her out, decided to change the direction of his planned concert series, and invited Zeke to a practice session. When offered the chance to sing the National Anthem at a Giants game, he accepts as long as Zeke will go with him, stunning Zeke's adoptive parents. The song goes well, but Joe pushes too far afterwards.
12	"Whiteout"	Barbara Brown	Garrett Lerner & Danielle DiPaolo	January 17, 2022	1DGT12	1.37
A blizzard and power outage serve as the centerpieces of the three story lines. Nurse Joe makes a business pitch to a department store. His practice sessions are dry and Kinsley helps spice the presentation up. Chris asks if it's possible to like two people at the same time. The department store offers to buy the company instead of the pants. The blizzard keeps Kinsley at the apartment and the power outage lets them get closer. Jenny is asked to give the closing argument in the case she's been working in Atlanta, leading to a celebration. Officer Joe gives blood for Lucas' surgery. Jenny arrives, as well, and they talk about 2012, when Joe tried to reconnect with her while she was pregnant. Amy is starting a new podcast focused on police reform and she asks Joe to be a guest. During the surgery, Jenny's husband Ray tells Joe how he convinced Jenny to not see Joe in 2012. The power outage happens during the surgery, but it goes well. Lucas asks to see his dad when he wakes up. Musician Joe is on tour and spiraling out of control through alcohol and an affair. Uncle Frank and his manager try to get through to him to slow down, but he's not listening. While drunk, he calls Amy and leaves a message saying that they are done. At a concert in New York, he falls off the stage and injures himself. The storm provides an option to cancel some tour dates, but Joe refuses. His manager and Uncle Frank quit to try and reach him. He claims he's a force of nature, which is when the power goes out. In the last scene, he's drunkenly driving a rebuilt Porsche 944S2 similar to his father's down the road with his girlfriend and gets into an accident.
13	"Aftermath"	Adam Davidson	Russel Friend & Sarah Heveron-Cilio	January 24, 2022	1DGT13	1.41
Baby births serve as the centerpieces of two of the timelines, while rebirth may be the theme of the third. A St. Christopher medal also appears in two of the timelines. Nurse Joe immediately breaks his kiss with Kinsley and apologizes. Feeling guilty, he decides to take Chris on a road trip to surprise Jenny in Atlanta for Valentine's Day. Chris is suspicious of the trip's motives, but is very happy when it includes a stop to see a rocket launch. Jenny makes her first closing statement, winning her case and an offer to be a law partner in a new firm. Eric and Amy's adoptive baby is born. Joe arrives in Atlanta and asks that he and Jenny renew their vows, but she has company. Officer Joe meets Amy's parents after she records her podcast with them. Amy's father presses Joe on how he can be a police officer knowing there are bad cops on the force and also asks after Joe's plans to speak on behalf of his uncle for reinstatement. At the hearing, Joe says that his uncle isn't ready to return to duty until he defeats his alcoholism and the board agrees to let him return to duty after completing rehab. Joe gets the call that Eric and Mallory's baby is coming and he ends up delivering it in the pizza shop. Amy comes to the hospital to tell Joe she's moving to Miami to be with her family, but he asks her to marry him and stay. Musician Joe has a vision of his father at the accident scene. He's taken to the hospital (where he has visions of his other two lives), where he sees his family but still denies that he needs help with his behavior. He contacts Jenny for legal help, who has a lawyer friend that tells Joe he'll be made an example of because he's a celebrity. After his hospital release, he gets his mugshot and Uncle Frank shows him the wrecked Porsche. Joe agrees to rehab and starts the recovery process, but seeing that Amy lost her primary election drives him to leave the facility. He's seen describing his life mistakes at someone's front door and it's eventually revealed to be Jenny's.

== Production ==
=== Development ===
The series was originally written as a pilot by executive producer Matt Reeves for ABC in 2006, based on a concept that Caleb Ranson had been developing for a separate British series for ITV, but neither program ended up moving forward. The project was revived a decade later and received a put pilot commitment by NBC on November 5, 2018. In January 2020, the series received a pilot order for the 2020–21 season and Adam Davidson was brought on as director the following month. The outbreak of the COVID-19 pandemic in March 2020 resulted in the series being pushed to the 2021–22 season. On March 31, 2021, NBC picked up the pilot to series. On March 4, 2022, NBC canceled the series after one season.

=== Casting ===
James Wolk was the first member to be cast in the series on February 19, 2020, in the title role of Joe Kimbreau. He was joined the following month by Natalie Martinez and Charlie Barnett portraying the characters Amy and Eric Payne respectively. In March 2021, it was announced that Elizabeth Lail would also be co-starring in the series. In June 2021, David Warshofsky was revealed to be a part of the series cast. In July 2021, Adam Rodriguez joined the cast in a recurring role. In August 2021, Jack Coleman, Christine Adams, Joe Carroll, Rushi Kota, Jason Burkey, and Gabrielle Byndloss joined the cast in recurring capacities.

=== Production design ===
The show uses color palettes to distinguish among the three timelines: green hues when Joe is a nurse, blue hues when he is a cop, and red hues when he is a rock star.

=== Filming ===
Principal photography on the pilot began in Chicago, Illinois, in March 2020, but was suspended within a few days due to COVID-related shutdowns. Consequently, the pilot remained only partially filmed. Production on the pilot resumed in November 2020 and was completed the following month. Filming on the remainder of the first season commenced on July 27, 2021 in Atlanta, Georgia, and concluded on December 10, 2021.

== Release ==
=== Broadcast ===
In May 2021, it was announced that the series would premiere in Fall 2021 and would air on Monday nights at 10 pm. On July 23, 2021, NBC released the first official trailer for the series. The series premiered on September 20, 2021 and concluded on January 24, 2022.

=== International ===
In Canada, the series aired on Citytv, with episodes being aired in simulcast with NBC.

In Malaysia, the series aired on PRIMEtime.

== Reception ==
=== Critical response ===
The review aggregator website Rotten Tomatoes reports a 50% approval rating with an average rating of 6.3/10, based on 20 critic reviews. The website's critics consensus reads, "Ordinary Joe has an appealing start and premise, but it's hard to see whether it's [sic] triple timelines will add up to a satisfactory season of television." Metacritic, which uses a weighted average, assigned a score of 64 out of 100 based on 15 critics, indicating "generally favorable reviews".

The show's use of multiple color palettes was described by a critic as "notable but not distracting" to distinguish among the three timelines: green when Joe is a nurse, blue when he is a cop, and orange when he is a rock star.

=== Ratings ===
- Note: Live+3 day ratings have been used where Live+7 day ratings are unavailable.

Viewership and ratings per episode of Ordinary Joe
No.	Title	Air date	Rating (18–49)	Viewers (millions)	DVR (18–49)	DVR viewers (millions)	Total (18–49)	Total viewers (millions)
1	"Way Leads on to Way"	September 20, 2021	0.5	3.85	0.2	1.33	0.7	5.19
2	"Requiem"	September 27, 2021	0.4	2.69	0.1	0.73	0.5	3.42
3	"Happy Birthday Jenny"	October 4, 2021	0.3	2.63	0.1	0.87	0.4	3.49
4	"Shooting Star"	October 11, 2021	0.5	2.70	0.1	1.05	0.6	3.75
5	"Mask On Mask Off"	October 18, 2021	0.4	2.43	0.1	1.17	0.5	3.60
6	"Always Do the Right Thing"	October 25, 2021	0.3	2.44	0.1	0.85	0.4	3.29
7	"The Letter"	November 1, 2021	0.3	2.22	0.1	0.78	0.4	3.00
8	"Reset"	November 15, 2021	0.3	2.04	0.1	1.00	0.4	3.04
9	"Thankful"	November 22, 2021	0.3	2.15	0.1	1.08	0.4	3.23
10	"Snow Globe"	January 3, 2022	0.2	1.41	0.1	0.79	0.3	2.19
11	"Calling an Audible"	January 10, 2022	0.2	1.45	—N/a	—N/a	—N/a	—N/a
12	"Whiteout"	January 17, 2022	0.2	1.37	0.1	0.72	0.3	2.09
13	"Aftermath"	January 24, 2022	0.2	1.41	0.1	0.73	0.3	2.14

== See also ==
- If/Then
- Sliding Doors
- Awake, 2012 TV series
