= Thunder Road Films =

US film production company

- Type: Private
- Industry: Film
- Founded: 2003; 23 years ago
- Founder: Basil Iwanyk
- Headquarters: Santa Monica, California
- Products: Film and Television Production

Thunder Road Films (also known as Thunder Road Pictures) is an independent film and television production company founded by Basil Iwanyk. It is based in Santa Monica, California.

Thunder Road's films have grossed over $4.1 billion worldwide and garnered nominations from the Academy Awards, Golden Globes, Producers Guild Awards, Writers Guild Awards, Directors Guild Awards, and AFI Awards. The company is known for producing a diverse range of films, including action blockbusters, dramas, and thrillers. Its most successful films include John Wick, The Town, and Sicario.

The company has developed a reputation for supporting the directorial debuts of established actors, with Taylor Sheridan, Halle Berry, and Dev Patel directing their first films with the company.

== Management ==
Producer Basil Iwanyk founded the film and television production company Thunder Road in 2003 after he left Intermedia, and first signed a deal with Warner Bros. Pictures. It has been speculated that the company's name comes from the Thunder Road roller coaster located at the Carowinds amusement park on the border between Fort Mill, South Carolina, and Charlotte, North Carolina, as referenced in the company's production logo at the beginning of films the studio has produced. In 2021, Erica Lee was named partner at Thunder Road, moving from her position as president of production.

== Collaboration deals ==
In July 2011, after leaving Warner Bros. Television, Thunder Road signed a first-look deal with Sony Pictures Television to develop television projects.

In May 2013, Thunder Road signed on a deal with Cutting Edge Group to finance the company's film music slate. The first film covered under that deal was John Wick.

In May 2015, Thunder Road renewed its slate agreement with Cutting Edge Group and its investment arm, Conduct, which finances the music budgets of films and television programs in exchange for IP rights to each project's original music.

In September 2020, Thunder Road teamed with Redbox on joint venture Asbury Park Pictures for the purpose of making 12 films over the next three years. The film budgets would range between $10 million to $12 million, with distribution via Redbox kiosks and on demand services.

Thunder Road announced a development deal with Steven Klinsky's Untravelled Worlds in May 2025.

== Production ==
Thunder Road has been producing films since 2006, which included 2006's Firewall and We Are Marshall; 2009's Brooklyn's Finest; and 2010's Clash of the Titans and The Town. The company also produced all three installments of The Expendables series.

The company has since has gone on to produce films with Warner Bros. Pictures, Netflix, Lionsgate Films, A24, Amazon MGM Studios and Universal Pictures.

== Filmography ==
=== Film ===
- 2006: Firewall
- 2006: We Are Marshall
- 2008: Lost Boys: The Tribe
- 2009: Brooklyn's Finest
- 2010: Clash of the Titans
- 2010: The Town
- 2010: Lost Boys: The Thirst
- 2012: Wrath of the Titans
- 2014: John Wick
- 2015: Seventh Son
- 2015: Sicario
- 2016: Gods of Egypt
- 2017: John Wick: Chapter 2
- 2017: Wind River
- 2017: The Current War
- 2017: 24 Hours to Live
- 2018: Sicario: Day of the Soldado
- 2018: Hotel Mumbai
- 2018: A Private War
- 2018: Robin Hood
- 2019: John Wick: Chapter 3 – Parabellum
- 2019: The Informer
- 2020: Endless
- 2020: Bruised
- 2020: Greenland
- 2021: Voyagers
- 2021: National Champions
- 2022: The Contractor
- 2023: The Accidental Getaway Driver
- 2023: John Wick: Chapter 4
- 2023: Love Again
- 2023: Kandahar
- 2023: Silent Night
- 2024: Monkey Man
- 2024: Breathe
- 2024: Trigger Warning
- 2025: Relay
- 2025: Fight or Flight
- 2025: Ballerina
- 2025: Dust Bunny
- 2026: Greenland 2: Migration
- 2026: The Devil's Mouth
- 2026: By Any Means
- 2026: Crawlers

==== Upcoming ====
- 2027: The Surgeon
- 2027: Day Drinker
- 2027: Mister
- TBA: Wind River: The Next Chapter
- TBA: Perfect Girl
- TBA: Highlander
- TBA: Caine
- TBA: The Kellys
- TBA: Hivemind
- TBA: The Nest
- TBA: The Peasant

=== Television ===
- 2015: The Messengers
- 2020: The Fugitive
- 2023: The Continental
