= Trigger Warning (film) =

2024 film by Mouly Surya

- Release poster
- Directed by: Mouly Surya
- Written by: John Brancato; Josh Olson; Halley Gross
- Produced by: Erica Lee; Basil Iwanyk; Esther Hornstein
- Starring: Jessica Alba; Mark Webber; Tone Bell; Jake Weary; Gabriel Basso; Anthony Michael Hall
- Cinematography: Zoë White
- Edited by: Robert Grigsby Wilson; Chris Tonick
- Music by: Enis Rotthoff
- Production companies: Thunder Road Films; Lady Spitfire
- Distributed by: Netflix
- Release date: June 21, 2024
- Running time: 106 minutes
- Country: United States
- Language: English

Trigger Warning is a 2024 American action thriller film starring Jessica Alba as a skilled special operations officer who takes ownership of her father's bar shortly after he dies, and soon finds herself at odds with the violent gang running rampant in her hometown. It is directed by Mouly Surya in her English-language film debut, and written by John Brancato, Josh Olson and Halley Gross. It is produced by Thunder Road Films and Lady Spitfire. It also stars Mark Webber, Tone Bell, Jake Weary, Gabriel Basso, and Anthony Michael Hall.

The spec script for Trigger Warning was first acquired by Thunder Road Films in June 2016. Netflix later acquired the film in May 2020. Several castings were announced in September 2021, with filming occurring in New Mexico. It was released by Netflix on June 21, 2024, and received negative reviews from critics.

== Plot ==
A highly skilled CIA military combatant and investigator, Parker, is on a mission in Syria with her friend Spider, when she is called by her ex-lover and the sheriff of her hometown, Jesse Swann, informing her that her father, Harry Calvo, has died in a mining accident.

She returns to her hometown, Creation, New Mexico, for her father's funeral and to settle affairs with his bar named Maria's. Parker meets with friend and manager of the bar, Mike, and investigates the mine, deducing that Harry's death was not an accident. At a bar, Parker gets into a confrontation with Jesse's younger brother, Elvis, and later, she rescues a hardware store owner from thieves.

Parker witnesses Elvis and his henchmen firing weapons and snooping on her family property. When calling Spider to investigate, he finds that Elvis is a weapons dealer on the dark web who supplies arms to terrorists. While reconnecting with Jesse, Parker meets his father and senator, Ezekiel Swann, who is running for reelection.

Later, after Harry's funeral, Parker meets with Jesse and Ezekiel at their compound before Spider messages to inform her that Elvis' men are trespassing in Harry's mine. She confronts them and they burn down her bar, leading to the death of one of the henchmen and Parker being arrested.

Jesse confronts Elvis about the incident, revealing that Elvis had been using Harry's mine to take weapons from a nearby military depot. They had managed to access an underground tunnel and start secretly funneling weapons out to sell them to arms dealers, funding Ezekiel's campaign and helping Jesse become sheriff.

When Harry found out, Jesse killed him, and the Swanns blamed it on a mine collapse – which Harry triggered as he lay dying. Ezekiel orders them to stop arguing, dictates that the arms dealing will continue, and has Jesse kill Parker's lawyer.

After killing the lawyer, Jesse lets Ezekiel and Elvis into the holding cells, where they tie Parker up and beat her in an attempt to obtain the security footage from her bar. She escapes from the cells in a police cruiser, but passes out from her injuries while driving and crashes in a field on Mike's property.

Mike and his mother hide Parker so she can recover in his hidden weed lab, while Elvis confronts them, threatening to burn down the property if they do no produce her. After three days of recovery, Parker tries to warn the senior officer at the weapons depot about the arms thefts, but his staff hangs up on her. Eager for payback, and with the assistance of family friends Mo and Frank, Parker collects enough weapons to wage her own war on the Swanns.

Ghost, a Timothy McVeigh-esque domestic terrorist wanted for the murder of at least 37 Americans, has paid the Swanns hundreds of thousands of dollars in advance for stolen weapons, and they are not delivered, thanks to Parker's interference. When pressed on the matter, Ezekiel admits he already spent the money on his re-election campaign. Parker infiltrates the Swann compound and confronts Ezekiel, getting answers for what happened to her father before killing him.

Spider arrives at the mines to assist Parker, but encounters Ghost's thugs. Parker explodes a weapons truck to distract the thugs, allowing her and Spider to kill them before she stabs Elvis to death. Mo, Frank and Parker's family friends arrive in the mines to help her see her mission through, discovering the military depot exit.

Jesse arrives with a grenade in his hand, desperate to take control of the situation. Parker offers to help him, but he realizes there's no happy ending for him and he shoves her away before blowing himself up.

With the Swann family dead, Parker is able to move on with her life. A month later, Parker and Spider are driving cross country to return to their CIA jobs when Mikey video calls, with an update on the advanced progress of work to rebuild and reopen Maria's.

== Cast ==
- Jessica Alba as Parker, an active-duty Special Forces commando
  - Gianna Gallegos as a teenaged Parker.
- Mark Webber as Jesse, the sheriff and Ezekiel's eldest son, and Parker's ex-boyfriend
- Tone Bell as Spider, a covert ops specialist and hacker
- Jake Weary as Elvis, Ezekiel's youngest son, Jesse's brother, and an arms dealer
- Gabriel Basso as Mike, a cannabis producer and Parker's bestfriend
- Anthony Michael Hall as Ezekiel, a senator
- Kaiwi Lyman as Ghost
- Hari Dhillon as Mohame
- Alejandro De Hoyos as Harry, Parker's late father
- James Cady as Frank, Harry's old friend
- Stephanie Jones as Georgia, Mike's mother

== Production ==
In June 2016, Thunder Road Films acquired Josh Olson and John Brancato's spec script for Trigger Warning. Basil Iwanyk and Erica Lee were attached to produce the film, described as a female-led cross between First Blood (1982) and John Wick (2014). In May 2020, Netflix bought the film with Indonesian director Mouly Surya set to make her first English-language film, while Jessica Alba came on board to star and executive produce. In September 2021, Anthony Michael Hall, Mark Webber, Alejandro De Hoyos, Tone Bell, Jake Weary, and Gabriel Basso were cast, with Halley Gross revising the script. Filming was scheduled to commence in New Mexico in late 2021. On October 1, 2021, crew member James Saul was hospitalized after a snapped cable hit and broke his leg. Enis Rotthoff composed the film's score.

== Release ==
Trigger Warning was released by Netflix on June 21, 2024.

== Reception ==
On the review aggregator website Rotten Tomatoes, 21% of 43 critics' reviews are positive, with an average rating of 3.4/10. The website's consensus reads: "Trigger Warning sure packs a punch when doling out clichés and dialing up the snooze fest." Metacritic, which uses a weighted average, assigned the film a score of 36 out of 100, based on 14 critics, indicating "generally unfavorable" reviews.

Benjamin Lee of The Guardian wrote, "It’s not quite enough to push the film into genuinely smart or noteworthy territory but it adds some punchy election year anger to Alba's inevitable and involving revenge mission". Jesse Hassenger of IGN wrote, "Trigger Warning mashes together three different types of pulpy thrillers, but it sometimes feels as if the Jessica Alba vehicle isn’t bothering to actually take the best of what it’s ripping off". Brian Lowry of CNN wrote, "Trigger Warning might not be packing anything unexpected in the chamber, but for those who come to it with the proper mind-set, the movie doesn’t wind up firing blanks either."
