= Gods of Egypt (film) =

2016 film directed by Alex Proyas

- Theatrical release poster
- Directed by: Alex Proyas
- Written by: Matt Sazama; Burk Sharpless
- Produced by: Basil Iwanyk; Alex Proyas
- Starring: Nikolaj Coster-Waldau; Brenton Thwaites; Chadwick Boseman; Élodie Yung; Courtney Eaton; Rufus Sewell; Gerard Butler; Geoffrey Rush
- Cinematography: Peter Menzies Jr.
- Edited by: Richard Learoyd
- Music by: Marco Beltrami
- Production companies: Summit Entertainment; Mystery Clock Cinema; Thunder Road Films
- Distributed by: Lionsgate (United States)
- Release date: February 26, 2016 (United States)
- Running time: 127 minutes
- Country: United States
- Language: English
- Budget: $140 million
- Box office: $150.6 million

Gods of Egypt is a 2016 American fantasy action film directed by Alex Proyas based on ancient Egyptian deities. It stars Nikolaj Coster-Waldau, Brenton Thwaites, Chadwick Boseman, Élodie Yung, Courtney Eaton, Rufus Sewell, Gerard Butler, and Geoffrey Rush. The film follows the Egyptian god Horus, who partners with a mortal Egyptian thief, on a quest to rescue his love and to save the world from Set.

Filming took place in Australia under the film production and distribution company Summit Entertainment in collaboration with Thunder Road Pictures and Proyas's production company Mystery Clock Cinema. While the film's production budget was $140 million, the parent company Lionsgate's financial exposure was less than $10 million because of tax incentives and pre-sales. The Australian government provided a tax credit for 46% of the film's budget. When Lionsgate began promoting the film in November 2015, it immediately received backlash for its predominantly white cast playing Egyptian deities. In response, Lionsgate and director Proyas apologized for their ethnically-inaccurate casting.

Gods of Egypt was released in the United States, Canada, and 70 other markets on February 26. It received negative reviews from critics and grossed a total of $150.7 million against a $140 million budget, becoming a box office failure and losing $90 million for Lionsgate. It received five nominations at the 37th Golden Raspberry Awards.

== Plot ==
In ancient Egypt, where the gods live among the mortal humans, thief Bek and his lover Zaya attend the coronation of King Osiris and Isis's son, Horus. However, Osiris is killed by his jealous brother Set, who then defeats Horus and takes his eyes. Set proclaims himself the new king and commands humans to pay riches to pass into the afterlife.

One year later, with Egypt enslaved by Set and Isis having committed suicide, Zaya steals plans for Set's pyramid from chief architect Urshu. Bek uses the plans to infiltrate Set's treasure vault and steals one of Horus's eyes, but he and Zaya are caught by Urshu, who kills Zaya as she and Bek try to escape. Bek takes her body to the exiled Horus along with the eye and promises to help find the other if he brings Zaya back from the dead. Meanwhile, Set launches an assault on the rebels and claims the wings of his wife Nephthys.

Bek and Horus visit the solar barque of Horus's grandfather Ra, who is neutral about matters in Egypt and in conflict with the shadow beast Apophis, which threatens to eat the world. Ra does not restore Horus's power but allows him to take a vial of divine waters to weaken Set. Ra explains that Horus's loss of his powers is the result of not fulfilling his destiny, which Horus believes means avenging his parents' deaths.

Returning to Egypt, Bek and Horus escape from Mnevis, who is then killed by Set for failing to stop them. Set orders Hathor to take him to the underworld, but she refuses and joins Bek and Horus after rescuing them from Astarte and Anat. They hatch a plan to infiltrate Set's pyramid, recruiting Thoth to solve the riddle of the guardian sphinx. Passing the pyramid's entryway and the sphinx's riddle, they reach the source of Set's power, but before using the divine water they are ambushed by Set, who incapacitates Thoth and takes his brain, traps Horus and Hathor and destroys the water vial. Horus breaks the trap and Hathor calls on Anubis to take Bek to save Zaya, offering her bracelet as Zaya's payment for passage to the afterlife, but in doing so exiles herself to the underworld.

Absorbing Thoth's brain, Osiris's heart, Horus's eye, and Nephthys's wings, Set confronts Ra aboard his solar barge. Ra explains Set's mistreatment and impotency was a test to prepare him to take Ra's place as defender of the world against Apophis. Dismayed, Set decides to destroy the afterlife to become immortal and uses his new powers to overpower Ra. Set takes Ra's spear and throws him from the barge, freeing Apophis to consume the mortal and underworld realms. As Apophis attacks, Anubis closes the gates to the afterlife. Not wanting an afterlife without Bek, Zaya refuses Hathor's gift and encourages Bek to return to Egypt and help Horus defeat Set.

As Horus battles Set atop an obelisk, Bek kills Urshu before removing Horus's other eye from Set's armor, mortally wounding himself in the process. Regaining his power to transform, Horus flies after Bek, realizing his true destiny is to protect his people. With renewed strength, Horus outmaneuvers and kills Set. Finding Ra wounded in the aether, Horus returns his spear, healing Ra enough to repel Apophis and Anubis to reopen the gates.

A child returns Horus's other eye and the god lays Bek in Osiris's tomb beside Zaya. For his deeds, Ra offers to bestow Horus with any power and Horus asks that Bek and Zaya be brought back to life. Ra restores Bek and Zaya, as well as the gods who had not already passed into the afterlife. Horus is crowned king and declares access to the afterlife will be paid with good deeds in life. Bek is made chief advisor and gives Hathor's bracelet to Horus, who leaves to retrieve her from the underworld.

== Cast ==
- Brenton Thwaites as Bek, a young thief who allies with Horus.
- Nikolaj Coster-Waldau as Horus, the Egyptian God of Air, son of Isis and Osiris.
- Chadwick Boseman as Thoth, the Egyptian God of Wisdom
- Élodie Yung as Hathor, the Egyptian Goddess of Love and Horus' lover
- Courtney Eaton as Zaya, Bek's lover
- Gerard Butler as Set, the Egyptian God of the Desert and brother of Osiris
- Geoffrey Rush as Ra, the Egyptian God of the Sun and father of Osiris and Set
- Bryan Brown as Osiris, the Egyptian God of the Afterlife, the king of Egypt, and the father of Horus
- Rufus Sewell as Urshu, Set's mortal second-in-command and architect
- Rachael Blake as Isis, the wife of Osiris
- Emma Booth as Nephthys, sister of Isis and wife of Set

In addition: Lindsay Farris provides the voice of an older Bek who narrates the film. Yaya Deng and Abbey Lee appear as Astarte and Anat, goddesses of war who are loyal to Set and ride giant fire-breathing cobras. Goran D. Kleut provides the voice and motion-capture of Anubis, the jackal-headed Egyptian god who leads Zaya into the underworld. Alexander England provides the voice and motion capture of Mnevis, the leader of the Egyptian Minotaurs that work for Set and can assume a human form. Kenneth Ransom provides the voice and motion capture of the riddle-giving Sphinx that guards the entrance to Set's pyramid.

== Production ==
=== Development ===
... the world of Gods of Egypt never really existed. It is inspired by Egyptian mythology, but it makes no attempt at historical accuracy because that would be pointless — none of the events in the movie ever really happened. It is about as reality-based as Star Wars — which is not real at all ... Maybe one day if I get to make further chapters I will reveal the context of the when and where of the story. But one thing is for sure — it is not set in Ancient Egypt at all.

— Director Alex Proyas, December 2015

Gods of Egypt is directed by Alex Proyas based on a screenplay by Matt Sazama and Burk Sharpless. The film was produced under Summit Entertainment. Proyas was contracted by Summit in May 2012, to write the screenplay with Sazama and Sharpless, and to direct the film. Proyas said he sought to make a big-budget film with an original premise, to contrast franchise films. The director cited the following films as influences on Gods of Egypt: The Guns of Navarone (1961), Lawrence of Arabia (1962), The Man Who Would Be King (1975), Raiders of the Lost Ark (1981), and Sergio Leone's Western films. Lionsgate anticipated that Gods of Egypt would be the first film in a new franchise after it finished releasing The Hunger Games films.

=== Casting ===
Actor Nikolaj Coster-Waldau was cast in June 2013. Gerard Butler, Geoffrey Rush, and Brenton Thwaites joined the cast toward the end of 2013. Chadwick Boseman and Élodie Yung joined the cast at the start of 2014.

=== Filming ===
The film was shot in Australia. A crew of 200 began pre-production in Sydney in New South Wales, and producers considered filming in Melbourne, Victoria, to take advantage of the state's tax incentive. Docklands Studios Melbourne was too booked to accommodate Gods of Egypt, and producers were instead offered an airport facility for production. The Australian states of New South Wales and Victoria competed to be the location of the film's production, and Summit selected New South Wales in February 2014. New South Wales Deputy Premier Andrew Stoner estimated that the production would add 400 jobs to the state and contribute $75 million to its economy. (Note: The union Media Entertainment & Arts Alliance filed an objection with Australia's Fair Work Commission stating that the film would adopt unfair work conditions. The union contested the production being Australian enough to receive a 40% producer rebate, yet importing work conditions substandard for Australia.)

Principal photography began on March 19, 2014 at Fox Studios Australia in Sydney. The setting of Anubis' temple was filmed at Centennial Park in Sydney, and visual effects were laid over the scene. The production budget was $140 million. Jon Feltheimer, the CEO of Summit's parent company Lionsgate, said Lionsgate's financial exposure was under $10 million due to tax incentives of filming in Australia, as well as foreign pre-sales. The Australian government's tax credit to have the film produced in the country covered 46% of the $140 million production budget, and most of the remaining budget was covered by the foreign pre-sales.

In the film, the gods in humanoid form are 9 feet (2.7 m) tall and in "battle beast" form are over 12 feet (3.7 m) tall. Proyas used forced perspective and motion control photography to portray the difference in height between the actors portraying the gods and the humans. Proyas called the logistical challenge a "reverse Hobbit", referring to The Lord of the Rings films, in which Hobbits are depicted as shorter than humans. For the sphinx, actor Kenneth Ransom portrayed the giant creature via motion-capture. For the god Thoth, who can appear as many copies, actor Chadwick Boseman was filmed hundreds of times from different angles. For a scene with many copies of Thoth, other actors took a day to film the scene, where Boseman filmed the scene for three days.

=== Music ===
Composer Marco Beltrami, who scored Proyas's previous films Knowing (2009) and I, Robot (2004), returned to score Gods of Egypt.

== Racial and ethnic casting ==
White actors, predominantly of Northwestern European descent, make up most of the principal cast of Gods of Egypt. When Lionsgate began marketing the film, the Associated Press said the distributor received backlash for ethnically inaccurate casting. Lionsgate and director Alex Proyas both issued apologies. The AP said, "While some praised the preemptive mea culpa... others were more skeptical, concluding that it's simply meant to shut down any further backlash."

The casting practice of white actors as Ancient Egyptian characters was first reported after filming started in March 2014, when Daily Life's Ruby Hamad highlighted the practice as "Hollywood whitewashing". Lionsgate released a set of character posters in November 2015, and The Guardian reported that the casting received a backlash on Twitter over the predominantly white cast. Some suggested that the casting of black actor Chadwick Boseman, who plays the god Thoth, played into the Magical Negro stereotype. The previous year, the biblical epic Exodus: Gods and Kings by director Ridley Scott received similar backlash for having a white cast. (Note: Filmmakers for Gods of Egypt had already set their cast and had completed filming when backlash occurred over the casting practice for Exodus: Gods and Kings.) The Washington Post's Soraya Nadia McDonald also disparaged the casting practice for Gods of Egypt and said Lionsgate released the posters at an unfortunate time. She said with the release of Aziz Ansari's TV series Master of None in the previous week, "Whitewashed casting and the offensiveness of brownface has pretty much dominated the pop culture conversation this week. Promotion for the movie is beginning just as we're wrapping a banner year for discussions of diversity and gender pay equity in the film industry."

When Lionsgate followed its release of posters with a release of a theatrical trailer, Scott Mendelson at Forbes said, "The implication remains that white actors, even generic white actors with zero box office draw, are preferable in terms of domestic and overseas box office than culturally-specific (minority) actors who actually look like the people they are supposed to be playing." He said almost none of the actors, aside from potentially Butler, qualified as box office draws. BET's Evelyn Diaz said while Ridley Scott had defended his casting practice for Exodus by claiming the need to cast box office draws, "Gods of Egypt is headlined by character actors and Gerard Butler, none of whom will have people running to the theater on opening day." Deadline's Ross A. Lincoln said of the released trailer, "Casting here stands out like a sore thumb leftover from 1950s Hollywood. I suspect this film generates a lot of conversation before it hits theaters February 26, 2016."

In response to criticisms of its casting practice, director Alex Proyas and Lionsgate issued apologies in late November 2015 for not considering diversity; Lionsgate said it would strive to do better. Mendelson of Forbes said the apologies were "a somewhat different response" than defenses made by Ridley Scott for Exodus and Joe Wright for Pan (2015). Ava DuVernay, who directed Selma (2014), said, "This kind of apology never happens... for something that happens all the time. An unusual occurrence worth noting." The Guardian's Ben Child said, "The apologies are remarkable, especially given that Gods of Egypt does not debut in cinemas until 26 February and could now suffer at the box office." Michael Ordoña of San Francisco Chronicle said of the apologies, "That's little comfort to the nonwhite actors denied opportunities or the Egyptians who will see a pale shadow of their ancestral traditions." The Casting Society of America applauded the statements from Lionsgate and Proyas. Professor Todd Boyd, chairman for the Study of Race and Popular Culture at the University of Southern California, said, "The apology is an attempt to have it both ways. They want the cast that they selected and they don't want people to hold it against them that it's a white cast."

Boseman, who plays the god Thoth, commented on the whitewashing by saying that he expected the backlash to happen when he saw the script: "I'm thankful that it did, because actually, I agree with it. That's why I wanted to do it, so you would see someone of African descent playing Thoth, the father of mathematics, astronomy, the god of wisdom." Actor Nikolaj Coster-Waldau said, "A lot of people are getting really worked up online about the fact that I'm a white actor. I'm not even playing an Egyptian; I'm an 8-foot-tall god who turns into a falcon. A part of me just wants to freak out, but then I think, 'There's nothing you can do about it.' You can't win in that sort of discussion."

In the month leading up to release, director Proyas said his film was fantasy and not intended to be history. He cited "creative license and artistic freedom of expression" to cast the actors he found to fit the roles. He said "white-washing" was a justified concern but for his fantasy film, "To exclude any one race in service of a hypothetical theory of historical accuracy ... would have been biased." Proyas said that films "need more people of color and a greater cultural diversity" but that Gods of Egypt "is not the best one to soap-box issues of diversity with". He argued that the lack of English-speaking Egyptian actors, production practicalities, the studio's requirement for box office draws, and Australia having guidelines limiting "imported" actors were all factors in casting for the film. He concluded, "I attempted to show racial diversity, black, white, Asian, as far as I was allowed, as far as I could, given the limitations I was given. It is obviously clear that for things to change, for casting in movies to become more diverse many forces must align. Not just the creative. To those who are offended by the decisions which were made I have already apologised. I respect their opinion, but I hope the context of the decisions is a little clearer based on my statements here." After the film was critically panned, Proyas said, "I guess I have the knack of rubbing reviewers the wrong way. This time of course they have bigger axes to grind – they can rip into my movie while trying to make their mainly pale asses look so politically correct by screaming 'white-wash!!!'"

== Release ==
=== Marketing ===
Lionsgate Films spent an estimated $30 million on marketing the film. It released a set of character posters in November 2015 for which it received backlash due to white actors playing Egyptian characters, as noted above. Later in the month, it released a theatrical trailer. Lionsgate aired a 60-second spot for Gods of Egypt during the pre-game show of the Super Bowl 50 on February 7, 2016, though they released the trailer online a day earlier.

In the week before the film's release, Lions released the tie-in mobile game Gods of Egypt: Secrets of the Lost Kingdom on iOS and Android.

=== Box office forecast ===
BoxOffice forecast two months in advance that Gods of Egypt would gross $14.5 million on its opening weekend in the United States and Canada, and that it would gross $34 million total on its theatrical run. The magazine said the film had "a strong ensemble cast" and that its director has "had a noteworthy following". BoxOffice also said the premise could attract movie-goers who saw Clash of the Titans, Wrath of the Titans, and the Percy Jackson films. Admissions to 3D screenings would help boost Gods of Egypt's gross. The magazine said factors negatively affecting the film's gross were a "lackluster reaction" to its marketing and the backlash to its predominantly white cast causing negative buzz. It anticipated that the film's release would be front-loaded (focused on profiting mainly from opening weekend) due to the poor buzz, its categorization as a fantasy film, and with London Has Fallen opening the following weekend.

A week before the film's release, TheWrap's Todd Cunningham reported an updated forecast of $15 million for its opening weekend in the United States and Canada. The Hollywood Reporter's Pamela McClintock said it was tracking to gross between $12 million and $15 million. Cunningham said the expected gross was low for the film's triple-digit budget as well as additional marketing costs. He said the film could attract Alex Proyas's fan base but that it had suffered "some negativity out there" due to the predominantly white casting as well as the film being perceived to have an "old-fashioned" feel. Exhibitor Relations senior media analyst Jeff Bock said the film "feels late" years after the release of 300 (2007) and Immortals (2011), and an earlier production and release would have been more advantageous. Cunningham said with Lionsgate's financial exposure only being $10 million and the expected opening gross, the film could gross between $40 million and $50 million for its theatrical run in the United States and Canada and ultimately avoid a loss. The Hollywood Reporter's McClintock said "ancient epics" in recent years had not performed well at the box office, citing the 2014 films Hercules, The Legend of Hercules, and Pompeii.

Ryan Faughnder of the Los Angeles Times said in the week before the film's release that the expected opening weekend gross meant that Lionsgate's plans to make Gods of Egypt the first film in a new franchise were unlikely. Faughnder said the film would need to perform strongly in territories outside the United States and Canada for a sequel to be developed. Variety's Brent Lang reported that analysts said the film would need to open to $30 million or more in the United States to justify a sequel.

=== Home media ===
The film was released on May 31, 2016, on DVD, Blu-ray and Ultra HD Blu-ray by Lionsgate Home Entertainment.

== Reception ==
=== Box office ===
Gods of Egypt grossed $31.2 million in the United States and Canada, and $119.6 million in other countries, for a worldwide total of $150.7 million against a production budget of $140 million with Lionsgate losing up to $90 million on the film when factoring together all expenses and revenues, according to The Hollywood Reporter. In August 2024, over eight years after its release, Deadline Hollywood reported the film had finally managed to break-even following its fifth and sixth home release windows.

Lionsgate released Gods of Egypt in theaters globally starting on February 25, 2016. It was released in 2D, RealD 3D, 4DX, and IMAX 3D. Lionsgate released the film in the United States and Canada on the weekend of February 26–28, as well as in 68 other markets, (Note: Lionsgate initially scheduled the film to be released in the United States on February 12, 2016, then it postponed the release to April 8, 2016, before finalizing the date to February 26, 2016.) including Russia, South Korea, and Brazil. Jaguar Films released the film in the United Arab Emirates (February 25) and other countries in the Middle East under the title Kings of Egypt. Viacom18 Motion Pictures released the film in India on February 26, 2016 in four languages: English, Hindi, Tamil, and Telugu, while 9ers Entertainment released the film in South Korea on March 3.

In the United States and Canada, the film was released in 3,117 theaters. It grossed an estimated $800,000 in Thursday-night previews and $4.8 million on Friday, lowering the projected weekend gross to $11–13 million. It went on to gross $14.1 million in its opening weekend, finishing second at the box office behind Deadpool ($31.5 million). It competed with fellow newcomers Eddie the Eagle and Triple 9, as well as with Deadpool, which opened two weekends earlier. Opening-day audiences polled by CinemaScore gave the film an average grade of "B−" on an A+ to F scale. The Christian Science Monitor's Molly Driscoll said the Gods of Egypt's US release was during "a traditionally quiet time at the box office". Scott Mendelson of Forbes commented on supporting versus opposing a successful debut of the film, as "It's an example of a great wrong in modern Hollywood (whitewashing) while existing as a great right (an original fantasy from a gifted and visionary director) at the same time."

Outside North America, the film got a staggered release. In its opening weekend, it was number one across Central America, Eastern Europe and South East Asia. Top openings were in Russia ($4.3 million), Brazil ($1.9 million) and Philippines ($1.7 million).

Le Vision Pictures acquired rights from Lionsgate in November 2015 to distribute Gods of Egypt in China, and released the film there on March 11, 2016. China was the film's largest territory, with US$35.6 million. Entertainment One also released the film in the United Kingdom on June 17, 2016.

=== Critical response ===
Gods of Egypt received negative reviews from critics. On Rotten Tomatoes, the film has an approval rating of 15% based on 193 reviews, with an average rating of 3.7/10. Metacritic gives the film a score of 25 out of 100 based on 25 critics, indicating "generally unfavorable" reviews.

Alonso Duralde of TheWrap wrote, "A mishmash of unconvincing visual effects and clumsy writing—not to mention another depiction of ancient Egypt in which the lead roles are almost all played by white folks—Gods of Egypt might have merited a so-bad-it's-good schadenfreude fanbase had it maintained the unintentional laughs of its first 10 minutes. Instead, it skids into dullness, thus negating the camp classic that it so often verges on becoming." Joycelyn Noveck of the Chicago Sun Times gave the film a half star out of four, writing, "It's obvious the filmmakers were gunning for a sequel here. But this bloated enterprise is so tiresome by the end, it seems more likely headed for a long rest somewhere in the cinematic afterlife." Ignatiy Vishnevetsky of The A.V. Club called Gods of Egypt "overlong and very silly," and said: "A treasure trove of gilded fantasy bric-a-brac and clashing accents, Proyas' sword-and-sandals space opera is a head above the likes of Wrath of the Titans, but it rapidly devolves into a tedious and repetitive succession of monster chases, booby traps, and temples that start to crumble at the last minute."

Jordan Hoffman of The Guardian said, "This is ridiculous. This is offensive. This shouldn't be, and I'm not going to say otherwise if you can't bring yourself to buy a ticket for this movie. But if you are on the fence you can always offset your karmic footprint with a donation to a charity, because this movie is a tremendous amount of fun." Olly Richards of Empire was heavily critical, calling the film a "catastrophe" and "the Dolly Parton of movies, without any of the knowing wit".

In response to the reviews, director Proyas posted to Facebook calling critics "diseased vultures pecking at the bones of a dying carcass", who were "trying to peck to the rhythm of the consensus. I applaud any film-goer who values their own opinion enough to not base it on what the pack-mentality says is good or bad."

== Accolades ==
Award	Category	Nominee(s)	Result
AACTA Awards (6th)	Best Original Music Score	Marco Beltrami	Nominated
AACTA Awards (6th)	Best Sound	Wayne Pashley, Peter Grace, Derryn Pasquill, Fabian Sanjurjo, Greg P. Fitzgerald and Peter Purcell	Nominated
AACTA Awards (6th)	Best Costume Design	Liz Palmer	Nominated
AACTA Awards (6th)	Best Visual Effects or Animation	Eric Durst, Jack Geist, Andrew Hellen, James Whitlam and Julian Dimsey	Nominated
AACTA Awards (6th)	Best Hair and Makeup	Lesley Vanderwalt, Lara Jade Birch and Adam Johansen	Nominated
Golden Raspberry Awards	Worst Picture	Alex Proyas and Basil Iwanyk	Nominated
Golden Raspberry Awards	Worst Director	Alex Proyas	Nominated
Golden Raspberry Awards	Worst Actor	Gerard Butler	Nominated
Golden Raspberry Awards	Worst Screen Combo	Any two Egyptian gods or mortals	Nominated
Golden Raspberry Awards	Worst Screenplay	Matt Sazama and Burk Sharpless	Nominated
Houston Film Critics Society	Worst Film	Basil Iwanyk and Alex Proyas	Nominated

== See also ==
- Horus § Conflict between Horus and Set
- List of fantasy films of the 2010s
- List of biggest box-office bombs
- Whitewashing in film
