= Crawlers (film) =

2026 film by Ángel Gómez Hernández

- Theatrical release poster
- Directed by: Ángel Gómez Hernández
- Written by: Jayson Rothwell
- Produced by: Scott Strauss; Peter Welter; Jayson Rothwell; Basil Iwanyk; Erica Lee; Alexandra Milchan; Josh Weinstock
- Starring: Matilda Lutz; Gregg Sulkin; William Miller; Melina Matthews
- Production companies: Badlands; Thunder Road Films
- Distributed by: Roadside Attractions; Saban Films
- Release date: October 16, 2026
- Running time: 81 minutes
- Country: United States
- Language: English
- Box office: $1.4 million

Crawlers is a 2026 American horror-thriller film directed by Ángel Gómez Hernández starring Matilda Lutz, Gregg Sulkin, William Miller and Melina Matthews. Directed by Ángel Gómez Hernández and written by Jayson Rothwell, the story follows an outbreak of venomous spiders at an apartment complex under quarantine.

It was released in the United States by Roadside Attractions and Saban Films on October 16, 2026.

== Premise ==
After a mysterious death at an apartment complex, manager Serena discovers a rapidly spreading infestation of venomous spiders. Trapped under quarantine, the residents must fight to survive as Serena uses her knowledge of the building to lead them against the threat while also facing her deepest fear.

== Cast ==
- Matilda Lutz as Serena
- Gregg Sulkin
- William Miller
- Melina Matthews
- Gary Anthony Stennette

== Production ==
Crawlers was directed by Ángel Gómez Hernández and written by Jayson Rothwell, and marks the first production under Badlands, a collaboration between Scott Strauss and Thunder Road Films' Basil Iwanyk and Erica Lee. It was also produced by Rothwell, Alexandra Milchan, and Peter Welter. Renegade Capital backed the project. It stars Matilda Lutz, Gregg Sulkin, William Miller and Melina Matthews. Under the title Arachnid, principal photography began in Portugal in July 2024 for five weeks, ending in September.

== Release ==
Altitude Films handled international sales. In April 2026, Roadside Attractions and Saban Films acquired the US distribution rights and set a release date for October 2, 2026. It was later rescheduled and released on October 16.

== Reception ==
On the review aggregator Rotten Tomatoes, the film holds an approval rating of 63%, based on 30 reviews, with an average rating of 5.5/10. The website’s consensus reads: "With enough gory fun and clever modern touches to overcome its undercooked characters, Crawlers spins a suspenseful and gruesome web of creature feature scares."

== See also ==
- Cultural depictions of spiders
