= The Contractor (2022 film) =

2022 American thriller film by Tarik Saleh

- Official release poster
- Directed by: Tarik Saleh
- Written by: J.P. Davis
- Produced by: Basil Iwanyk; Erica Lee
- Starring: Chris Pine; Ben Foster; Gillian Jacobs; Eddie Marsan; J. D. Pardo; Florian Munteanu; Kiefer Sutherland
- Cinematography: Pierre Aïm
- Edited by: Theis Schmidt
- Music by: Alex Belcher
- Production companies: Thunder Road Films; 30West
- Distributed by: Paramount Pictures (United States); STXfilms (International)
- Release date: April 1, 2022
- Running time: 103 minutes
- Country: United States
- Language: English
- Box office: $2.1 million

The Contractor is a 2022 American action thriller film directed by Tarik Saleh in his English-language film debut. The film stars Chris Pine, Ben Foster, Gillian Jacobs, Eddie Marsan, J. D. Pardo, Florian Munteanu, and Kiefer Sutherland. Filming began in Europe in October 2019. It also filmed in Fort Bragg and wrapped at the end of 2019.

The Contractor was released in theaters and on-demand in the United States on April 1, 2022, by Paramount Pictures and STXfilms. The film received mixed reviews from critics, grossing $2.1 million at the box office.

== Plot ==
Sergeant First Class James Harper, a decorated Green Beret, is involuntarily discharged from the Army, losing his military benefits due to using illegal steroids to say active with a debilitating knee injury. Facing financial ruin, he contacts his friend Mike, who works with a private military company under the command of fellow veteran Rusty Jennings.

Harper is receiving lucrative offers from similar firms, but feels a sense of duty to his country. Mike tells him that Rusty runs clandestine operations for the Department of Defense. Harper agrees to meet Rusty after seeing Mike's opulent house. Harper signs on with Rusty and the team for an operation in Germany. As a sign of good faith, Rusty gives Harper's family $50,000 to help clear their debts.

Harper spends most of his tour surveilling a Middle Eastern scientist named Salim. After analyzing the data, Rusty informs the team that Salim is working for Al-Qaeda and developing a bio-agent to be used against America. He tells the team they have been given permission to raid Salim's laboratory and retrieve all of his research data. The team easily accesses the lab and acquires the data. They hear the police are en route and decide to destroy the lab and kill Salim, who protests that he is just a scientist working on a cure. They set the lab on fire and leave with the data. The team are confronted by the police where two team members are killed, Harper rescues a wounded Mike and they hide in a nearby storm drain.

Mike, believing he is about to die, begs Harper to talk to his family and get the data to Rusty. Harper provides a blood transfusion and saves Mike's life. After recuperating, Mike is ready to return to Rusty and the main team, but Harper's knee has given out on him, and he needs to rest. Mike leaves with the data informing Harper he will be picked up from the hotel as planned.

Harper makes it to the hotel and finds fresh clothes and a note from Mike saying that he went to hand off data. He tries to treat his injured knee and waits for Mike to return. When Mike doesn't come back Harper leaves the hotel, gets a burner phone, and makes contact with Rusty, who informs him there is a car waiting to exfiltrate him to safety, but Harper senses something is amiss when Rusty tells him that Mike never made it to Berlin. As he delays going to the car, a hit team emerges and they shoot at Harper. Harper evades capture and kills the hit team, who are former Recon Marines working for Rusty. Before dying, one of the Marines gives Harper intel on a safe house but advises him that he can never return home.

Harper visits Salim's home, threatening his wife into providing him with Salim's computer files. She gives Harper her husband's iPad, and he leaves for the safe house. At the safe house Virgil treats Harper's knee and says that he cannot return to his family. Harper plays a video on the iPad in which Salim explains that he was working on a successful H5N1 vaccine formula that he intends to provide for free, rather than sell to a pharmaceutical company. While Virgil shares dinner with Harper, another hit team attacks. Virgil is killed, but Harper escapes, setting off a booby trap for Rusty's team.

Harper returns to the United States. He tracks down Mike, who explains that Rusty also lied to him and told him Harper had died. Rusty has provided for Harper's family, and Mike advises Harper to disappear. Harper protests, winning his friend over, they set up a plan to get revenge on Rusty.

Mike gets Harper into Rusty's compound, where they surprise Rusty's guards. While Mike distracts everyone with a frontal attack, Harper infiltrates Rusty's house. Harper manages to murder Rusty but not before Rusty has mortally wounded Mike. Mike shares his last moments with his best friend before succumbing to his wounds, and Harper burns his body with his car. Harper fulfils his oath to tell Mike's family about the man he was.

== Cast ==
- Chris Pine as James Harper
- Ben Foster as Mike Hawkins
- Gillian Jacobs as Brianne Harper
- Eddie Marsan as Virgil
- J. D. Pardo as Eric
- Kiefer Sutherland as Rusty Jennings
- Florian Munteanu as Kauffman
- Nina Hoss as Katia
- Amira Casar as Sylvie
- Fares Fares as Salim

== Production ==
The project was announced in May 2019 as Violence of Action, with Chris Pine set to star.

In October, Ben Foster and Gillian Jacobs joined the cast. Filming started in October 2019 in the United States, and continued in Germany and Romania later in the year. The film is produced by Basil Iwanyk and Erica Lee from Thunder Road Films with Esther Hornstein co-producing. Executive producers includes 30WEST's Dan Friedkin, Micah Green and Dan Steinman, along with Pine, Jonathan Fuhrman, Tom Lassally and Josh Bratman. In November 2019, filming in Romania started for around eight weeks. By December 2019, Eddie Marsan, Nina Hoss, Amira Casar, Fares Fares and J. D. Pardo had joined the film. Filming wrapped by the end of 2019.

In November 2021, it was reported that the film had been retitled The Contractor.

Alex Belcher composed the film score. Sony Classical released the soundtrack.

== Release ==
In February 2021, STXfilms acquired U.S. distribution rights to the film. The movie was originally scheduled for release on December 10, 2021, but the release was delayed to March 18, 2022, and then to April 1, 2022. In February 2022, it was announced Paramount Pictures and Showtime acquired U.S. distribution rights to the film from STX. Paramount released the film in a simultaneous limited theatrical and premium video-on demand release on April 1, 2022, with the film coming to Paramount+ and Showtime later in the year. The rights for the film were put in bankruptcy on March 22, 2022, with Migration, LLC now owning all worldwide rights to the film excluding United States.

The film debuted on Prime Video in select international territories as an Amazon Original.

== Reception ==
=== Box office ===
In the United States and Canada, The Contractor was released alongside Morbius, and was projected to gross less than $1 million from 489 theaters in its opening weekend. It made $560,678 in its first three days, finishing twelfth at the box office. It added $140,193 in its second weekend.

=== Critical response ===
The review aggregator Rotten Tomatoes reported an approval rating of 44% based on 88 reviews, with an average rating of 5.5/10. The website's critics consensus reads: "The Contractor is caught between message movie and standard-issue action thriller, satisfying neither aim despite strong work from a talented cast." Metacritic assigned the film a weighted average score of 52 out of 100 based on 19 critics, indicating "mixed or average" reviews.
