= Greenland 2: Migration =

2026 film by Ric Roman Waugh

- Theatrical release poster
- Directed by: Ric Roman Waugh
- Written by: Mitchell LaFortune; Chris Sparling
- Based on: Characters by Chris Sparling
- Produced by: Basil Iwanyk; Erica Lee; Sébastien Raybaud; John Zois; Gerard Butler; Alan Siegel; Ric Roman Waugh; Brendon Boyea
- Starring: Gerard Butler; Morena Baccarin; Roman Griffin Davis
- Cinematography: Martin Ahlgren
- Edited by: Colby Parker Jr.
- Music by: David Buckley
- Production companies: STXfilms; Anton; Thunder Road; G-BASE Film Production; Cinemachine
- Distributed by: Lionsgate
- Release dates: January 6, 2026 (Austria); January 9, 2026 (United States)
- Running time: 98 minutes
- Countries: United States; United Kingdom
- Language: English (Note: With some dialogue in French.)
- Budget: $90 million
- Box office: $45.2 million

Greenland 2: Migration is a 2026 American post-apocalyptic film that is the sequel to the disaster film Greenland (2020), with Gerard Butler and Morena Baccarin reprising their roles. The film is directed by Ric Roman Waugh and written by Chris Sparling and Mitchell LaFortune. The film also stars Roman Griffin Davis (who replaces Roger Dale Floyd), Amber Rose Revah, Gordon Alexander, Peter Polycarpou, William Abadie, and Tommie Earl Jenkins.

The film was first released in Austria on January 6, 2026, and then in the United States on January 9, 2026, by Lionsgate. It received mixed reviews from critics, although there was praise for Butler's performance. The film was a box office flop, grossing $45.2 million against a $90 million budget.

== Plot ==
Five years after the impact of interstellar comet Clarke destroyed civilization and most life on Earth, (Note: Depicted in Greenland (2020)) the environment is chaotic, with sudden electromagnetic storms, lingering radioactive fallout, deorbiting fragments of Clarke's debris ring, and tectonic earthquakes from the impact. The Garrity family lives in an underground bunker near Thule Air Base in Greenland; Allison is a leader, John a scout and engineer maintaining the community, and their now-teenaged son, Nathan, wants to be a scout. Earthquakes collapse the bunker, forcing an emergency evacuation. Most of the survivors are killed by a tsunami and the facility is destroyed.

The Garritys, Allison's colleagues Adam Shaw and Dr. Casey Amina, and a handful of other survivors escape on an aground lifeboat, barely making it to Liverpool. Adam is shot and killed by soldiers guarding another bunker from local survivors as a superstorm approaches. The last remnant of the Greenland group are separated in the ensuing chaos. Local survivor Obi agrees to transport the Garritys and Amina to Dover, but en route Obi is killed by impacting Clarke fragments.

The Garritys reach London, where they recuperate with an old friend who runs a memory care ward. While there, Allison learns John is dying from radiation sickness due to his scouting work. She wishes to stay, but John insists they continue onward toward the impact crater in southern France, the family having heard rumors that it provides protection from electric storms and radiation, and is being farmed and protected by the military. As they continue, Amina is shot and killed by bandits.

The family crosses the English Channel, now a dry, windswept wasteland, and meet a French family in Calais that shelters them. At the French family's request, the Garritys take their daughter Camille with them to the crater. They reach the front lines of a raging military battle defending the crater region, and are escorted behind the lines. On the way to the crater, insurgents ambush their transport, and John is shot defending the group.

The family finally reach the crater, where they find fertile farmland, fresh lakes, and clear skies free of ash and energy storms, confirming widespread rumors that the impact site had healed. The survivors rest before a safe valley. John succumbs to his wound within sight of their goal, satisfied he protected Allison, Nathan, and Camille for a safe new life.

== Cast ==
- Gerard Butler as John Garrity, a structural engineer and survivor of the Clarke impact
- Morena Baccarin as Allison Garrity, John's wife
- Roman Griffin Davis as Nathan Garrity, John and Allison's diabetic son. The character was previously portrayed by Roger Dale Floyd in the previous film with archive footage of Floyd's portrayal of Nathan being seen.
- Amber Rose Revah as Dr. Casey Amina, a scientist at the Thule Air Base
- Sophie Thompson as Mackenzie Matthews, an old friend of the Garrity family taking refuge in a London building who is among the survivors of Clarke's impact
- Trond Fausa Aurvåg as Adam Shaw
- William Abadie as Denis Laurent, a French survivor of Clarke's impact who took refuge in a building with his family
- Nelia Da Costa as Camille, the daughter of Denis who the Garrity family take with them
- Tommie Earl Jenkins as General Sharpe, the head of the Thule Air Base

Archive footage of Scott Glenn as Allison's father Dale was seen.

== Production ==
In June 2021, it was announced a sequel titled Greenland: Migration was in development. The following month, STX acquired the worldwide distribution rights for the film for $75 million at the 2021 Cannes Film Festival. It was put into bankruptcy protection, most of the cast returned, and while Morena Baccarin was initially reluctant, she eventually agreed to return for the sequel. Roman Griffin Davis replaced Roger Dale Floyd in playing Nathan Garrity. In May 2024, Lionsgate acquired U.S. distribution rights to the film. Eric Freidenberg edited the film in post-production.

Principal photography began on April 29, 2024, in Shinfield Studios and Alton, Hampshire, United Kingdom and Iceland. Filming concluded and wrapped in July 2024.

== Release ==
Greenland 2: Migration was first released in Germany, Hungary, Slovenia, and Croatia on January 8, 2026, and was released in the United States on January 9, 2026. It was originally scheduled to be released in the United States on March 28, 2025, but was delayed to January 9, 2026, taking the original release date of Mutiny. It was released in Singapore on January 8, 2026, by Encore Films. The movie became available to stream on HBO Max in May 2026.

== Reception ==
=== Box office ===
In the United States and Canada, Greenland 2: Migration grossed $17.8 million, with $27.4 million in other territories, for a worldwide total of $45.2 million, against a budget of $90 million. It opened at No. 6, its first of two consecutive weeks in the Top 10 at the domestic box office.

=== Critical response ===
On the review aggregator website Rotten Tomatoes, 48% of 105 critics' reviews are positive. The website's consensus reads: "The world ends more with a whimper in Greenland 2: Migration compared to its predecessor's big bang thrills, but Gerard Butler's sturdy star power keeps this continuation reasonably compelling." Metacritic, which uses a weighted average, assigned the film a score of 49 out of 100, based on 19 critics, indicating "mixed or average" reviews. Audiences polled by CinemaScore gave the film an average grade of "B−" on an A+ to F scale.

Chris Evangelista regarded the film as an "effective sequel" that "never overstays its welcome". John Lui of The Straits Times gave the film four out of five stars, praising the character development and how the film "places family bonds and moral integrity over spectacle, earning its emotional beats". Robert Daniels of The New York Times felt the sequel was a "notable step up" from the original, highlighting its theme that survival alone is insufficient without building a better world for the next generation. He observed that the film introduced a clearer, post-Covid message in place of the previous' pandemic undertones, and praised Gerard Butler's steady performance for bringing emotional weight to an otherwise spectacle-driven film. Katie Walsh of the Los Angeles Times wrote that the film presented a "proudly, even defiantly optimistic view of what comes after disaster". She also compared the film to 28 Years Later, noting their shared theme of fathers and teenage sons travelling from an island enclave to the United Kingdom years after catastrophe, though she observed that this film ultimately followed "a very predictable and straightforward path".

Jocelyn Noveck of the Associated Press called it "a serviceable but rather low-key, even grim affair". While she acknowledged the film's focus on "emotion and character", she felt these were not "compellingly rendered". Peter Sobczynski gave the film two out of four stars, writing that the sequel lacked the human drama central to the original film. Jesse Hassenger of The Guardian gave the film two out of five stars, noting how the film "walks back some of the hope that ended the first film" while exaggerating its earnest tone. He criticised the sequel for its random killing off of side characters before turning overly sentimental, calling its handling of drama heavy-handed. Although he praised Gerard Butler for his solid performance, Hassenger felt the film lapses into clichéd "good-dad" melodrama and takes itself too seriously, seeking emotional weight without genuine depth.
