= Basil Iwanyk =

American film producer (born 1970)

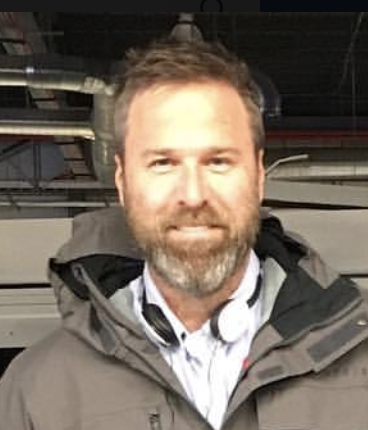
- Iwanyk on the set of Sicario
- Born: January 4, 1970 (age 56); Teaneck, New Jersey, U.S.
- Education: Villanova
- Occupation: Film producer

Basil William Iwanyk (born January 4, 1970) is an American film producer. He is the founder of Thunder Road Films and most known for the films Sicario, The Town, Greenland, and the John Wick franchise. His films have earned more than $2 billion internationally as of 2018.

After starting out working for Warner Bros in the 1990s and then Intermedia in the early 2000s, Basil founded the film production company Thunder Road in 2003. He would also create the production company Asbury Park Pictures, in 2020, to produce lower budget action films.

== Biography ==
Iwanyk grew up in New Jersey. His father is Ukrainian and his mother is of German and Irish descent. Iwanyk worked for Warner Bros. Entertainment in the 1990s before founding Thunder Road. Iwanyk was on the production team for the films Sicario and Wind River, both of which were written by Taylor Sheridan, who also directed Wind River and later became the show-runner of the TV show Yellowstone. Basil also produced Lionsgate's all of the movies and spinoff series in the John Wick franchise.

== Filmography ==
=== Films ===
Producer

- K-19: The Widowmaker (2002) (co-producer)
- Welcome to Mooseport (2004)
- Firewall (2006)
- We Are Marshall (2006)
- Lost Boys: The Tribe (2008) (Direct-to-video)
- Brooklyn’s Finest (2009)
- Clash of the Titans (2010)
- The Town (2010)
- Lost Boys: The Thirst (2010) (Direct-to-video)
- Wrath of the Titans (2012)
- John Wick (2014)
- Seventh Son (2015)
- Sicario (2015)
- Gods of Egypt (2016)
- John Wick: Chapter 2 (2017)
- Wind River (2017)
- The Current War (2017)
- 24 Hours to Live (2017)
- Sicario: Day of the Soldado (2018)
- Hotel Mumbai (2018)
- A Private War (2018)
- John Wick: Chapter 3 – Parabellum (2019)
- The Informer (2019)
- Endless (2020)
- Bruised (2020)
- Greenland (2020)
- Voyagers (2021)
- National Champions (2021)
- The Contractor (2022)
- Black Site (2022)
- Love Again (2023)
- John Wick: Chapter 4 (2023)
- Kandahar (2023)
- Silent Night (2023)
- Red Right Hand (2024)
- Monkey Man (2024)
- Breathe (2024)
- Trigger Warning (2024)
- Ballerina (2025)
- Relay (2025)
- Dust Bunny (2025)
- Greenland: Migration (2026)
- The Devil's Mouth (2026)
- Crawlers (2026)
- By Any Means (2026)
- The Surgeon (2026)
- Day Drinker (2027)
- Mister (2027)
- Wind River: The Next Chapter (TBA)
- Perfect Girl (TBA)
- Highlander (TBA)
- The Kellys (TBA)

Executive producer

- Basic (2003)
- If Only (2004)
- Mindhunters (2004)
- Laws of Attraction (2004)
- The Expendables (2010)
- The Expendables 2 (2012)
- The Expendables 3 (2014)
- A Star Is Born (2018)
- Robin Hood (2018)
- 62,000:1 Three Teams One City One Year (2019)

Other credits

Year	Title	Role	Notes
1993	Invisible: The Chronicles of Benjamin Knight	Production assistant	
2003	Masked and Anonymous	Production manager	Uncredited
2025	Wick Is Pain	Himself	Documentary film

=== Television ===
Executive producer

- King of Late Night (2012)
- The Messengers (2015)
- The Fugitive (2020)
- The Continental: From the World of John Wick (2023)
