= This Is Happening (film) =

- Film poster
- Directed by: Ryan Jaffe
- Written by: Ryan Jaffe
- Produced by: Lisa Barrett McGuire; Scott Einziger; Ryan Jaffe; Matthew Weinberg
- Starring: James Wolk; Mickey Sumner; René Auberjonois; Judd Nelson; Cloris Leachman
- Cinematography: Ryan Meyer
- Edited by: Dylan Firshein
- Music by: Adam Crystal
- Release dates: April 17, 2015 (Sarasota Film Festival); October 2, 2015
- Running time: 84 minutes
- Country: United States
- Language: English

This Is Happening is a 2015 independent film directed by Ryan Jaffe and starring James Wolk, Mickey Sumner, René Auberjonois, Judd Nelson, Cloris Leachman, and Emily Tremaine.

== Premise ==
This is Happening is an independent film about an estranged brother (James Wolk) and sister (Mickey Sumner) who go on a road trip to find their runaway grandmother.

== Cast ==
- James Wolk as Philip
- Mickey Sumner as Megan
- Cloris Leachman as Estelle
- Emily Tremaine as Ashley
- Rene Auberjonois as Cal Plotz
- Judd Nelson as Steven
- Mike Wade as Derek
- Shabana Shah Groovie's Groupie
- Kenny Apel as Gas Station Loser
- Jakki Jandrell Woman
- J DOC Farrow as Orderly
- Zarin Khan as Mother

== Release ==
The film saw limited release on October 2, 2015. The film was released for digital download on January 5, 2016.

=== Critical reception ===
On review aggregator Rotten Tomatoes, the film holds an approval rating of 43% based on 7 reviews, with an average rating of 5.1/10.
