= Dan Ziskie =

American actor (1944–2025)

Dan Ziskie (August 13, 1944 – July 21, 2025) was an American actor. He portrayed the character Frank Niggar on a popular sketch on Chappelle's Show. He was on Treme, where he played a politically connected banker in Post-Katrina New Orleans. He had a recurring role as the Vice President of the United States on the first season of House of Cards. He had a guest spot on Person of Interest and The Blacklist, portraying senators on both shows. On the season finale of 24's fifth season Ziskie played the United States Attorney General who, after hearing an audio recording of the president admitting that he took part in the assassination of a former president, orders his removal from office.

In October 2017, Ziskie released a collection of photographs of the New York City area taken from 2013 to 2016 in his first book, entitled Cloud Chamber.

Ziskie died on July 21, 2025, at the age of 80.

== Filmography ==
=== Film ===
Dan Ziskie film credits
Year	Title	Role	Notes
1985	The Man with One Red Shoe	Young American	
1985	Twisted	Phillip Collins	
1985	O.C. and Stiggs	Rusty Calloway	
1987	Adventures in Babysitting	Mr. Anderson	
1989	Troop Beverly Hills	Arthur Barnfell	
1990	Vital Signs	Dr. Kelly	
1992	Zebrahead	Mr. Cimino	
1997	The Jackal	CIA Representative #2	
2000	Isn't She Great	Guy's Doctor	
2000	Prince of Central Park	City Planner	
2000	Thirteen Days	General Walter "Cam" Sweeney	
2002	Bad Company	Officer Dempsey	
2003	Undermind	Sean Waye	
2004	Satan's Little Helper	Vernon	
2004	Kinsey	NYC Reporter #2	
2005	War of the Worlds	Informative Guy	
2006	Last Holiday	Dr. Thompson	
2006	Eight Below	Navy Commander	
2006	The Tokyo Trial		Chinese film
2008	Synecdoche, New York	Leg Tremor Doctor	
2008	New York, I Love You	Party's Guest	Uncredited
2009	The Rebound	Ken Gordon	
2010	Step Up 3D	NYU Dean	
2015	Concussion	Paul Tagliabue	
2016	Mercy	George	

=== Television ===
Dan Ziskie television credits
Year	Title	Role	Notes
1987	The Equalizer	Detective	Episode: "Beyond Control"
1987	Highway to Heaven	Mel Turner	1 episode
1989	Kojak: Fatal Flaw	Allardice	TV movie
1990	Quantum Leap	Sergeant Riley	1 episode
1995–2006	Law & Order	(various)	6 episodes
1999	The Practice	Mr. Hedberg	1 episode
2001	Law & Order: Special Victims Unit	Frank Foster	Episode: "Runaway"
2002	Law & Order: Criminal Intent	Walter Troy	Episode: "Tuxedo Hill"
2003	Law & Order: Special Victims Unit	Dr. Curtis	Episode: "Serendipity"
2003	The West Wing	O'Donnell	1 episode
2005	Louie	Sheriff	Episode: "Travel Day/South"
2006	24	Attorney General	1 episode
2007	Law & Order: Criminal Intent	John Lucas	Episode: "Seeds"
2012	Person of Interest	Senator Gene Atkins	1 episode
2013	The Good Wife	Steve Koesterich	1 episode
2013–17	House of Cards	Jim Matthews	6 episodes
2016	Blindspot	Peter Warren	1 episode
2017	Blue Bloods	Joseph Polito	1 episode
2018	Madam Secretary	Dr. Daniel Reese	1 episode
2019	Bull	Walter Franklin	Episode: "Security Fraud"
