= Chris Sparling =

American screenwriter and filmmaker (born 1977)

- Born: March 21, 1977 (age 49); Providence, Rhode Island, United States
- Occupations: Screenwriter; film director; film producer
- Spouse: Kerri Morrone Sparling

Chris Sparling (born March 21, 1977) is an American filmmaker from Providence, Rhode Island.

== Career ==
Upon graduating from Roger Williams University and Bridgewater State University with degrees in criminal justice, and after writing, directing, and producing several low-budget independent films, Sparling found mainstream success when his feature-length screenplay Buried was purchased by producer Peter Safran. Spanish director Rodrigo Cortés and actor Ryan Reynolds worked on the project. The film premiered at the 2010 Sundance Film Festival to high critical praise and was eventually sold to Lionsgate Films. After later playing additional film festivals worldwide—including the Toronto International Film Festival, as well as winning the Méliès d'Or Award at the Sitges Film Festival—it received a limited theatrical release in September 2010, earning over $18 million worldwide. The film was later released on DVD in January 2011. Sparling was awarded Best Original Screenplay by the 2010 National Board of Review for Buried and the film was selected as on the 10 Best Independent Films of 2010. He also won a Goya Award in 2011 for Best Original Screenplay, and he was nominated for a Gaudi Award as well in the same category.

Sparling later wrote the script ATM, a suspense thriller produced by Peter Safran and shot in Winnipeg, Manitoba in the fall of 2010 and released in 2012 by IFC Films. He also wrote Reincarnate for producer M. Night Shyamalan, the second film of a three-part series known as The Night Chronicles.

In 2014, Sparling was hired by Warner Brothers and Leonardo DiCaprio to adapt the crime novel Blood on Snow, written by author Jo Nesbø. This same year, his original screenplay, The Sea of Trees, went into production, starring Matthew McConaughey, Naomi Watts, and Ken Watanabe, and directed by Gus Van Sant.

Variety named Sparling one of "10 Screenwriters to Watch" in its November 2014 issue. Two months later, Sparling's horror-thriller film The Atticus Institute, which he both wrote and directed, was released by Anchor Bay Films. Universal Pictures distributed the film internationally. His directorial follow-up, Mercy, was released by Netflix in 2016.

He later wrote the 2020 film Greenland, which opened at number one at the box office in 26 countries and earned positive reviews from critics. The film stars Gerard Butler and Morena Baccarin, and was directed by Ric Roman Waugh. He will also write its sequel, titled Greenland: Migration, which was announced at the 2021 Cannes Film Market. 2021 also saw the release of two films he both wrote and produced: The Desperate Hour, starring Naomi Watts and directed by Phillip Noyce, and Intrusion, a Netflix Original starring Frieda Pinto.

== Filmography ==
Year	Title	Director	Writer	Producer	Notes
2005	An Uzi at the Alamo	Yes	Yes	Yes	
2007	Balance	Yes	Yes	Yes	Short film
2010	Buried	No	Yes	No	
2012	ATM	No	Yes	No	
2015	The Atticus Institute	Yes	Yes	Co-producer	
2015	The Sea of Trees	No	Yes	Yes	
2016	Mercy	Yes	Yes	No	
2018	The Warning	No	Yes	No	
2018	Down a Dark Hall	No	Yes	No	
2020	Falling Slowly	Yes	Yes	No	
2020	Greenland	No	Yes	No	
2021	The Desperate Hour	No	Yes	Yes	
2021	Intrusion	No	Yes	Yes	
2026	Greenland 2: Migration	No	Yes	No	
2026	Black Tides	No	Yes	No	
