= Jonathan Sela =

French-born Israeli cinematographer (born 1978)

- Born: April 29, 1978 (age 48); Paris, France
- Occupation: Cinematographer
- Years active: 1995–present

Jonathan Sela, ASC (born April 29, 1978) is a French-born Israeli cinematographer, known for his work in action films, especially with his collaboration with director David Leitch.

== Life and career ==
Sela was born in Paris, France.

At the age of 10, his Polish grandfather took him to the set of Schindler's List in Kraków, which inspired him to pursue a career in filmmaking. Four years later, he began working in Israel as a cameraman and lighting technician on numerous television films and shows, first as lighting technician, then as gaffer.

He emigrated to the United States at age 19, enrolling in the American Film Institute in Los Angeles. He served as assistant to cinematographer Vilmos Zsigmond for two films before making his debut as director of photography with the music video for Cypress Hill's Lowrider.

After shooting several shorts, he made his feature film debut with the 2004 comedy film Soul Plane. In 2006, he shot the remake of The Omen, the first of several collaborations with director John Moore. In 2008 he shot both the Clive Barker adaptation The Midnight Meat Train and Max Payne; a neo-noir action film based on the critically acclaimed video game of the same name.

Some of Sela's more recent projects include the F. Gary Gray-directed crime drama Law Abiding Citizen, the fifth entry of the Die Hard film series A Good Day to Die Hard, and the action thriller John Wick. Sela was director of photography on 2017's Transformers: The Last Knight, the fifth entry in the science fiction action franchise.

He has also worked on commercials for companies like Verizon Wireless, KFC, Gillette, and Mary Kay, and has shot music videos for artists like Rihanna and Green Day.

Sela was invited into the American Society of Cinematographers in December 2022.

== Personal life ==
Sela lives in Venice, California with his wife, photographer Megan Schoenbachler, and their two sons.

== Filmography ==
=== Film ===
Year	Title	Director	Notes
2004	Soul Plane	Jessy Terrero	
2006	Dreamland	Jason Matzner	
2006	Grimm Love	Martin Weisz	
2006	The Omen	John Moore	
2007	Randy and the Mob	Ray McKinnon	
2008	The Midnight Meat Train	Ryuhei Kitamura	
2008	Powder Blue	Timothy Linh Bui	
2008	Max Payne	John Moore	
2009	Law Abiding Citizen	F. Gary Gray	
2013	A Good Day to Die Hard	John Moore	
2014	John Wick	Chad Stahelski; David Leitch	
2017	Transformers: The Last Knight	Michael Bay	
2017	Atomic Blonde	David Leitch	
2018	Deadpool 2	David Leitch	
2019	Hobbs & Shaw	David Leitch	
2022	The Lost City	Aaron and Adam Nee	
2022	Bullet Train	David Leitch	
2024	I Was a Stranger	Brandt Andersen	
2024	The Fall Guy	David Leitch	
2026	How to Rob a Bank	David Leitch	
2026	The Man with the Bag †	Adam Shankman	Post-production
2027	Jason Statham Stole My Bike †	David Leitch	Post-production
2027	Sponsor †	James Ponsoldt	Post-production

=== Television ===
Year	Title	Director	Episode
2015	Limitless	Marc Webb	"Pilot"
2015	Crazy Ex-Girlfriend	Marc Webb	"Josh Just Happens to Live Here!"

=== Music video ===
Year	Title	Artist	Director
2001	"The Motivation Proclamation"	Good Charlotte	Marc Webb
2001	"Waiting"	Green Day	Marc Webb
2001	"Simple Creed"	Live	Marc Webb
2001	"Sunny Hours"	Long Beach Dub Allstars featuring will.i.am	Francis Lawrence
2001	"Lowrider"	Cypress Hill	Smith n' Borin
2002	"Anything"	Jaheim featuring Next	Darren Grant
2002	"I'm Just a Kid"	Simple Plan	Smith n' Borin
2002	"Walking Away"	Craig David	Lenny Bass
2002	"American Girls"	Counting Crows	Marc Webb
2002	"I Don't Wanna"	Keke Wyatt	Erik White
2002	"Dilemma"	Nelly featuring Kelly Rowland	Benny Boom
2002	"Luv U Better"	LL Cool J	Benny Boom
2002	"Hot Wheels"	Jim Crow	Fat Cats
2002	"Bigger Business"	Swizz Beatz featuring P. Diddy, Baby, Jadakiss, Cassidy and Snoop Dogg	Benny Boom
2002	"Crush Tonight"	Fat Joe featuring Ginuwine	Benny Boom
2002	"Paradise"	LL Cool J	Benny Boom
2003	"Pussycat"	Wyclef Jean	Director X
2003	"Rock Your Body"	Justin Timberlake	Francis Lawrence
2003	"Many Men (Wish Death)"	50 Cent	Jessy Terrero
2003	"Fallen"	Mýa	Darren Grant
2003	"The First Cut Is the Deepest"	Sheryl Crow	Wayne Isham
2003	"Milkshake"	Kelis	Jake Nava
2003	"Clap Back"	Ja Rule	Benny Boom
2003	"You Don't Know My Name"	Alicia Keys	Chris Robinson
2003	"Sick and Tired"	Nappy Roots	The Saline Project
2004	"The Unnamed Feeling"	Metallica	The Malloys
2004	"100 Years"	Five for Fighting	Trey Fanjoy
2004	"U Should've Known Better"	Monica	Benny Boom
2004	"Lola Stars and Stripes"	The Stills	Olivier Gondry
2004	"Love Will Come Through"	Travis	Arni & Kinski
2004	"A Million Days"	Prince	Sanaa Hamri
2004	"Slither"	Velvet Revolver	Kevin Kerslake
2004	"Who Is She 2 U"	Brandy	Jake Nava
2004	"My Boo"	Usher featuring Alicia Keys	Chris Robinson
2004	"Rumors"	Lindsay Lohan	Jake Nava
2004	"Sand in My Shoes"	Dido	Alex De Rakoff
2005	"Get Right"	Jennifer Lopez	Diane Martel
2005	"Over"	Lindsay Lohan	Jake Nava
2005	"Shiver"	Natalie Imbruglia	Jake Nava
2005	"The Clincher"	Chevelle	Nathan Cox
2005	"Cater 2 U"	Destiny's Child	Jake Nava
2005	"First"	Lindsay Lohan	Jake Nava
2005	"Make a Move"	Incubus	Marc Webb
2005	"No Daddy"	Teairra Marí	Jessy Terrero
2005	"Everlasting Love"	Jamie Cullum	Toby Tremlett
2005	"Let It Slide"	Joanna	Honey
2005	"Get Your Number"	Mariah Carey featuring Jermaine Dupri	Jake Nava
2006	"Pump It"	The Black Eyed Peas	Francis Lawrence
2006	"Coming Undone"	Korn	Director X
2006	"Rough Landing, Holly"	Yellowcard	Marc Webb
2006	"Ain't No Other Man"	Christina Aguilera	Bryan Barber
2006	"Morris Brown"	Outkast	Bryan Barber
2006	"Dark Blue"	Jack's Mannequin	Brett Simon
2006	"Save Room"	John Legend	Bryan Barber
2006	"We Ride"	Rihanna	Anthony Mandler
2006	"Love Like Winter"	AFI	Marc Webb
2006	"Irreplaceable"	Beyoncé	Anthony Mandler
2006	"Hurt"	Christina Aguilera	Floria Sigismondi & Christina Aguilera
2007	"Just Fine"	Mary J. Blige	Chris Applebaum
2008	"Love Lockdown"	Kanye West	Simon Henwood
2008	"Sex on Fire"	Kings of Leon	Sophie Muller
2009	"Russian Roulette"	Rihanna	Anthony Mandler
2009	"A Dustland Fairytale"	The Killers	Anthony Mandler
2009	"Kings and Queens"	Thirty Seconds to Mars	Bartholomew Cubbins
2009	"New Divide"	Linkin Park	Joe Hahn
2009	"21 Guns"	Green Day	Marc Webb
2009	"Run This Town"	Jay-Z featuring Rihanna and Kanye West	Anthony Mandler
2009	"Stronger"	Mary J. Blige	Anthony Mandler
2009	"It Kills Me"	Melanie Fiona	Armen Djerrahian
2009	"(If You're Wondering If I Want You To) I Want You To"	Weezer	Marc Webb
2010	"Last of the American Girls"	Green Day	Marc Webb
2010	"Pop Goes the World"	Gossip	Philip Andelman
2010	"Fistful of Tears"	Maxwell	Philip Andelman
2010	"Over"	Drake	Anthony Mandler
2010	"The Time (Dirty Bit)"	The Black Eyed Peas	Rich Lee
2011	"What the Hell"	Avril Lavigne	Marcus Raboy
2011	"E.T."	Katy Perry featuring Kanye West	Floria Sigismondi
2011	"Till the World Ends"	Britney Spears	Ray Kay
2011	"Right There"	Nicole Scherzinger	Paul Hunter
2011	"Dance for You"	Beyoncé	Alan Ferguson & Beyoncé
2012	"This Kiss"	Carly Rae Jepsen	Justin Francis
2013	"Give It 2 U"	Robin Thicke featuring Kendrick Lamar and 2 Chainz	Diane Martel
2013	"Wrecking Ball"	Miley Cyrus	Terry Richardson
2013	"Danse"	Mia Martina	Michael Maxxis
2014	"Love Never Felt So Good"	Justin Timberlake and Michael Jackson	Rich Lee & Justin Timberlake
2015	"Can't Feel My Face"	The Weeknd	Grant Singer
2015	"Finna Get Loose"	Puff Daddy featuring Pharrell Williams	Hype Williams
2018	"Ashes"	Céline Dion	David Leitch
2018	"Wild Hearts Can't Be Broken"	Pink	Sasha Samsonova
2018	"In My Blood"	Shawn Mendes	Jay Martin
2023	"I Can See You"	Taylor Swift	Taylor Swift
