= 76th Primetime Emmy Awards =

2024 American television programming awards

- Promotional poster
- Date: September 15, 2024 (Ceremony); September 7–8, 2024 (Creative Arts Awards)
- Location: Peacock Theater; Los Angeles, California
- Presented by: Academy of Television Arts & Sciences
- Hosted by: Eugene Levy; Dan Levy

Highlights
- Most awards: Major: Baby Reindeer / The Bear / Shōgun (4); All: Shōgun (18)
- Most nominations: Major: The Morning Show (11); All: Shōgun (25)
- Comedy Series: Hacks
- Drama Series: Shōgun
- Limited or Anthology Series: Baby Reindeer

Television/radio coverage
- Network: ABC
- Runtime: 3 hours, 8 minutes
- Viewership: 6.9 million
- Produced by: Jesse Collins Entertainment
- Directed by: Alex Rudzinski

The 76th Primetime Emmy Awards honored the best in American prime time television programming from June 1, 2023, until May 31, 2024, as chosen by the Academy of Television Arts & Sciences. The awards ceremony was held live on September 15, 2024, at the Peacock Theater in Downtown Los Angeles, California, and was preceded by the 76th Primetime Creative Arts Emmy Awards on September 7 and 8. During the ceremony, Emmy Awards were handed out in 25 different categories. The ceremony was produced by Jesse Collins Entertainment, directed by Alex Rudzinski, and broadcast in the United States by ABC. Eugene Levy and Dan Levy co-hosted the event.

At the main ceremony, Baby Reindeer, The Bear, and Shōgun tied for the most wins at four each, including Outstanding Limited or Anthology Series for Baby Reindeer and Outstanding Drama Series for Shōgun. Other winning programs were Hacks with three wins, including Outstanding Comedy Series, and Alex Edelman: Just for Us, The Crown, The Daily Show, Fargo, Last Week Tonight with John Oliver, The Morning Show, Ripley, Slow Horses, The Traitors, and True Detective: Night Country with one each. Including Creative Arts Emmys, Shōgun led all programs with 18 wins, a record for a show in one year; FX led all networks and platforms with 36 total wins.

== Winners and nominees ==
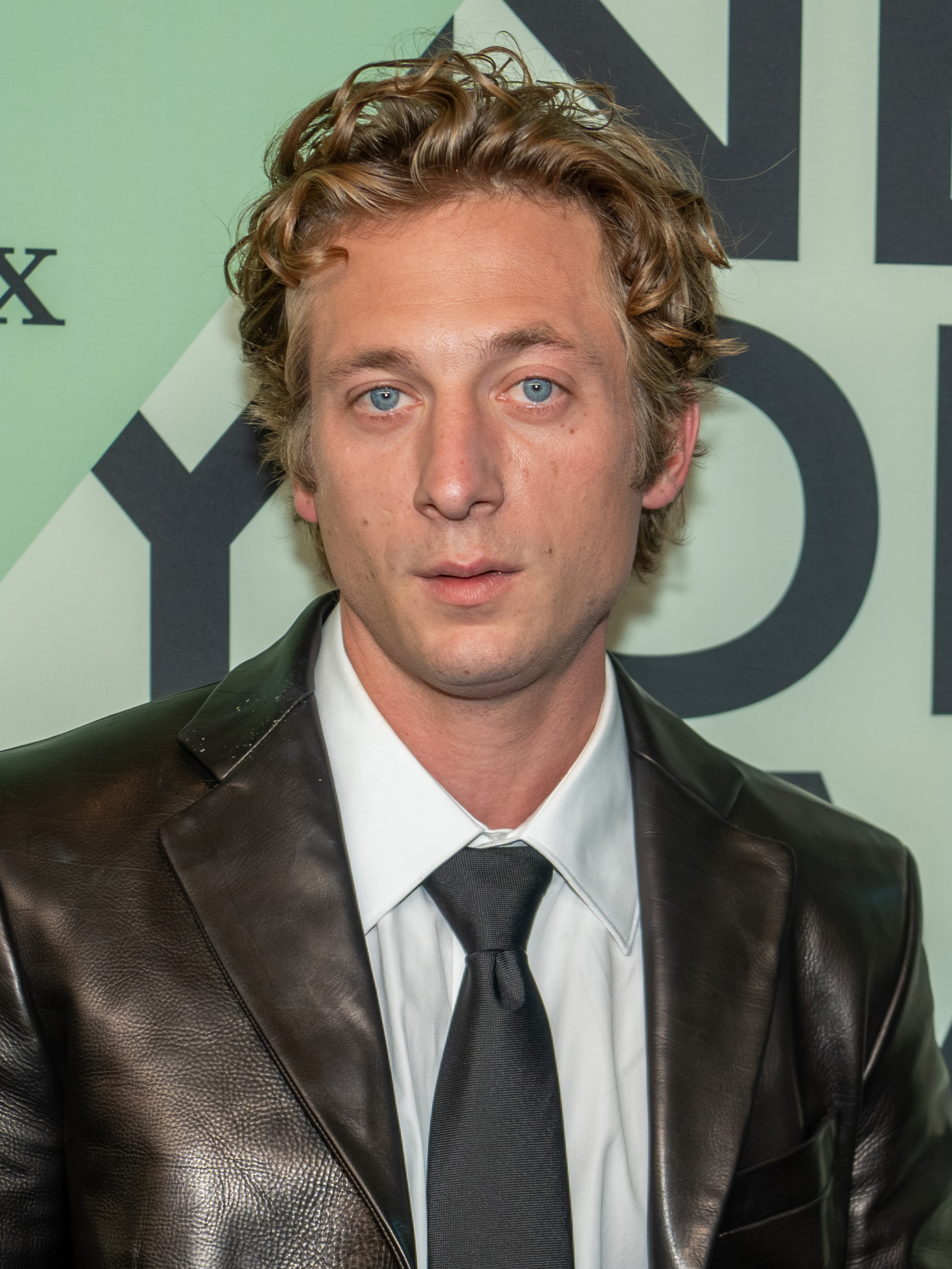
Jeremy Allen White, Outstanding Lead Actor in a Comedy Series winner

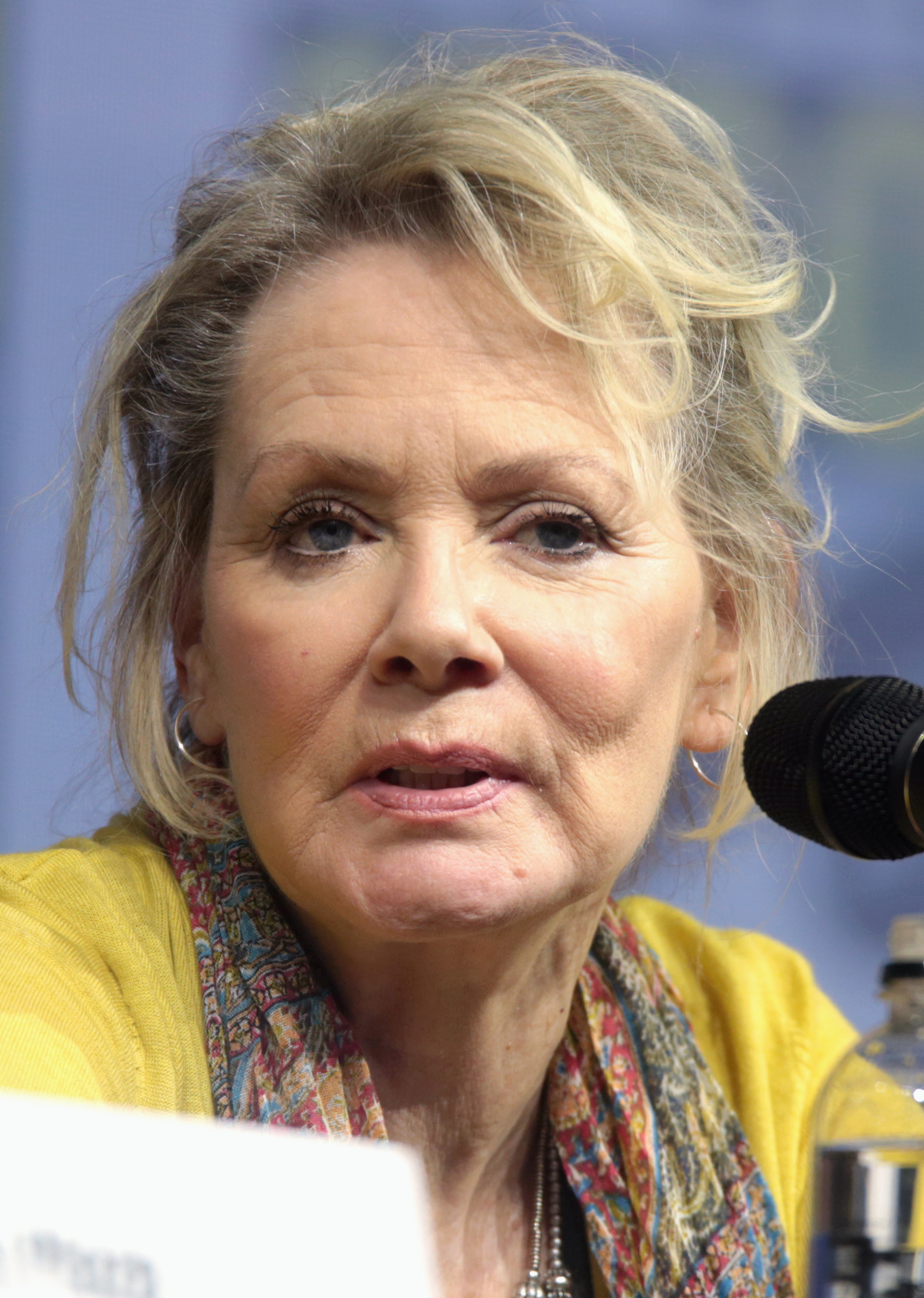
Jean Smart, Outstanding Lead Actress in a Comedy Series winner

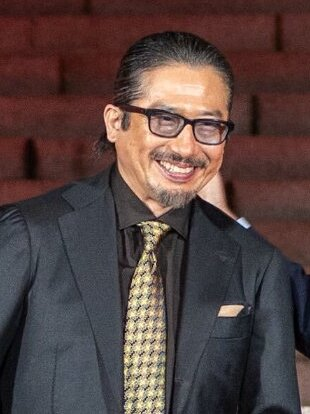
Hiroyuki Sanada, Outstanding Lead Actor in a Drama Series winner

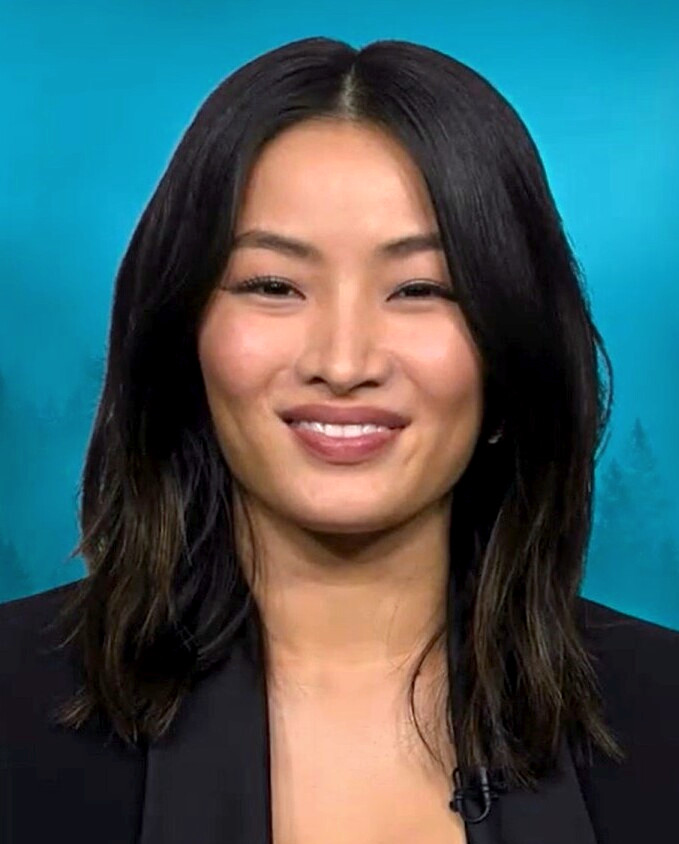
Anna Sawai, Outstanding Lead Actress in a Drama Series winner

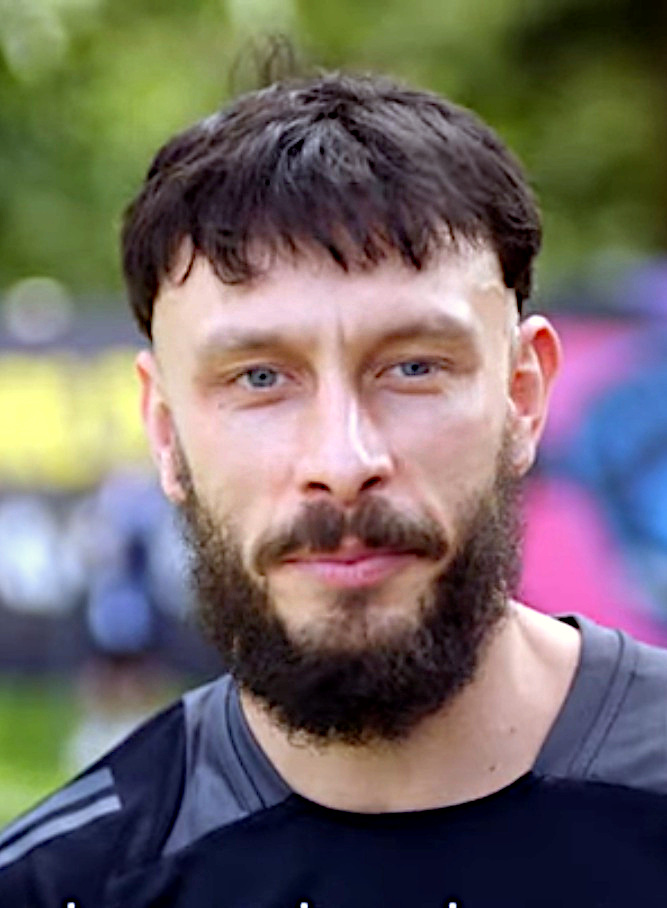
Richard Gadd, Outstanding Lead Actor in a Limited or Anthology Series or Movie winner

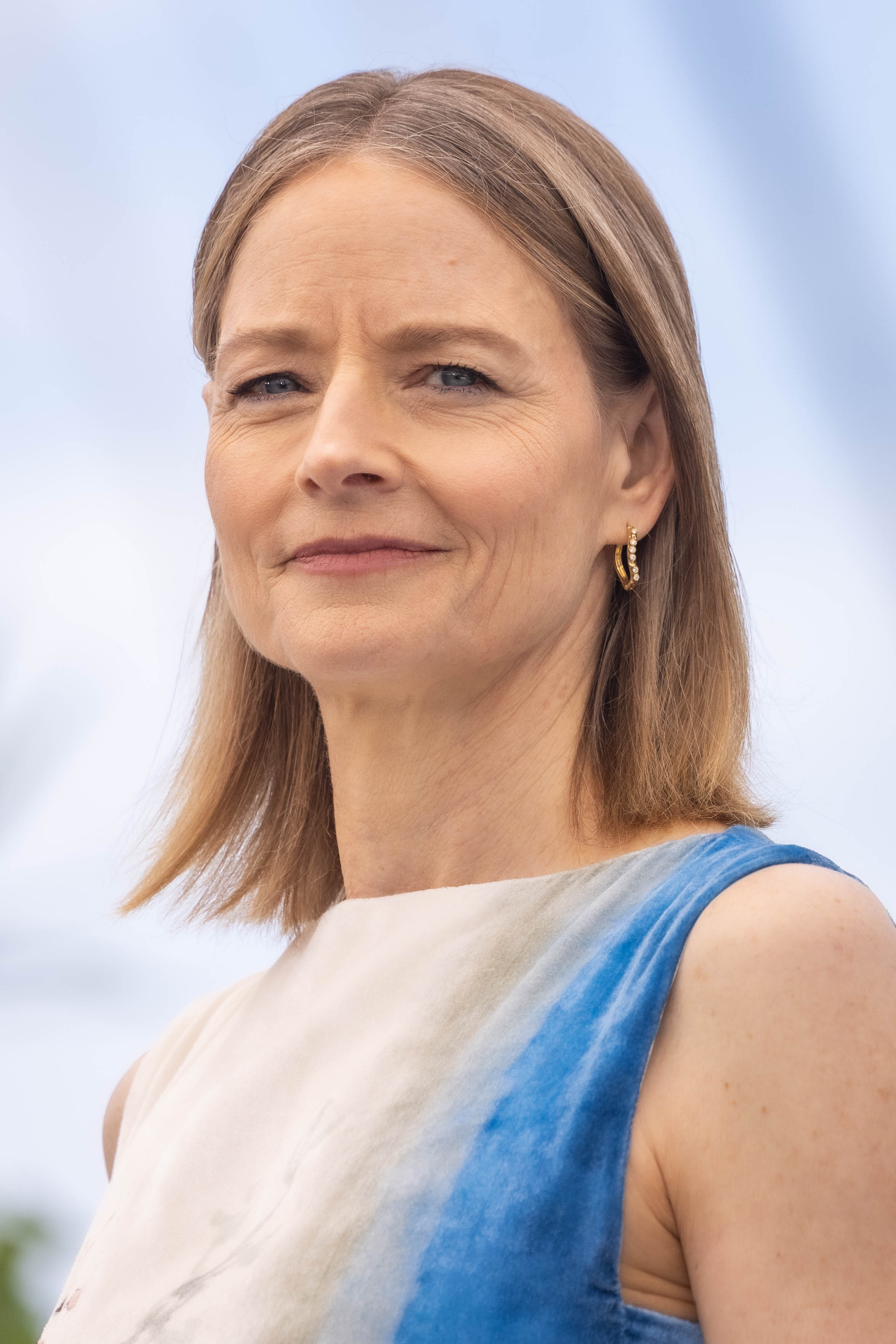
Jodie Foster, Outstanding Lead Actress in a Limited or Anthology Series or Movie winner

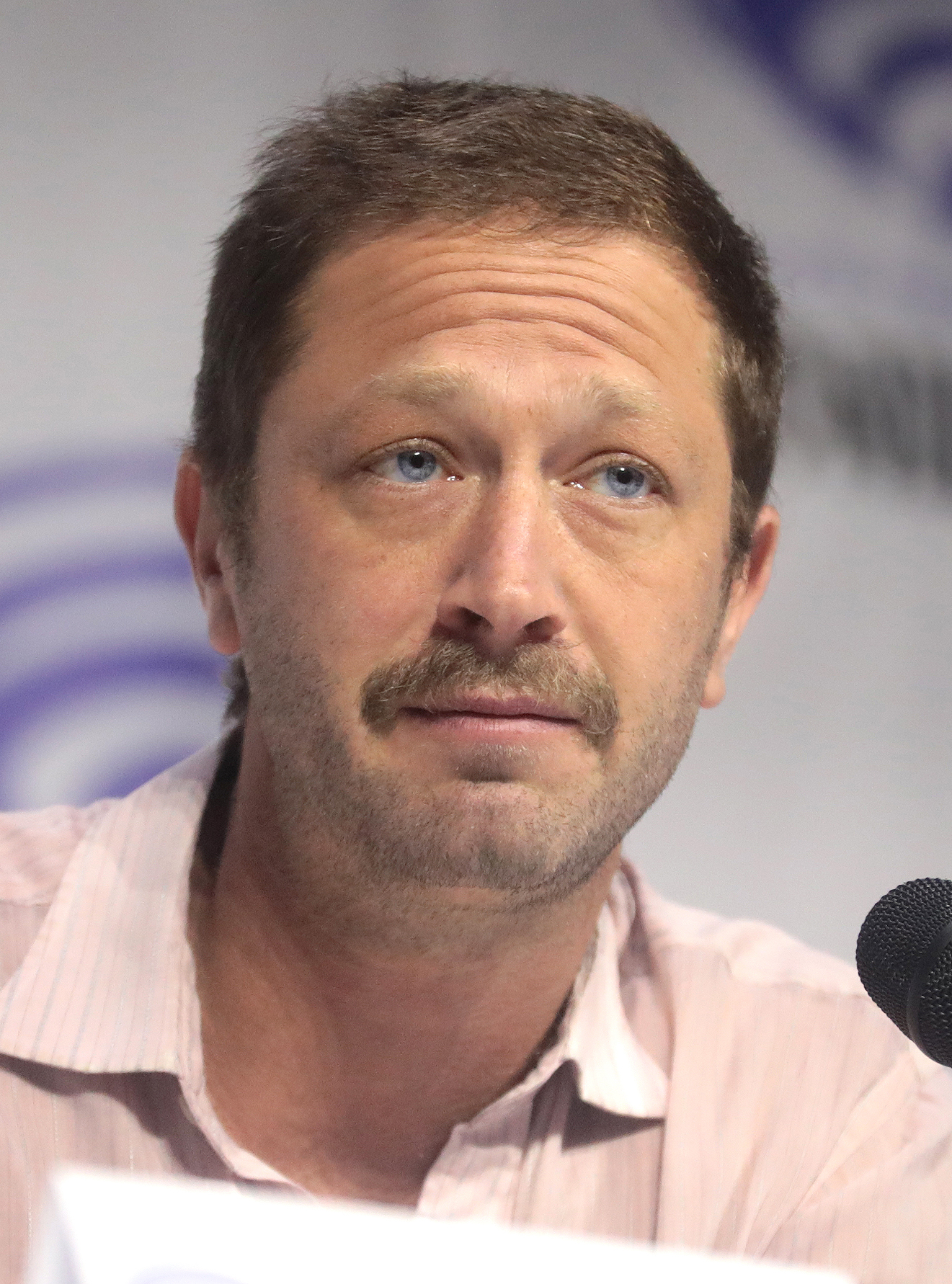
Ebon Moss-Bachrach, Outstanding Supporting Actor in a Comedy Series winner

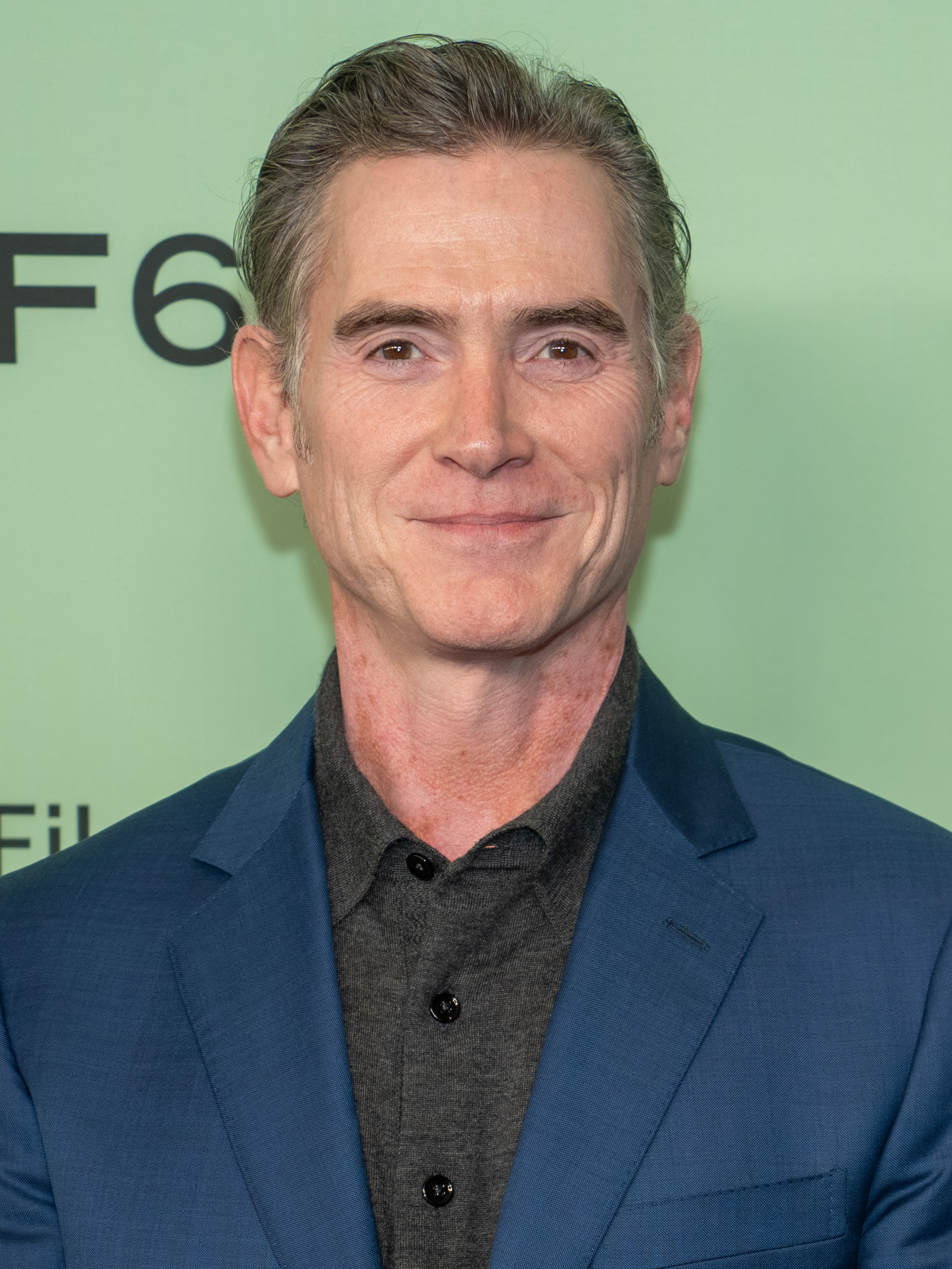
Billy Crudup, Outstanding Supporting Actor in a Drama Series winner

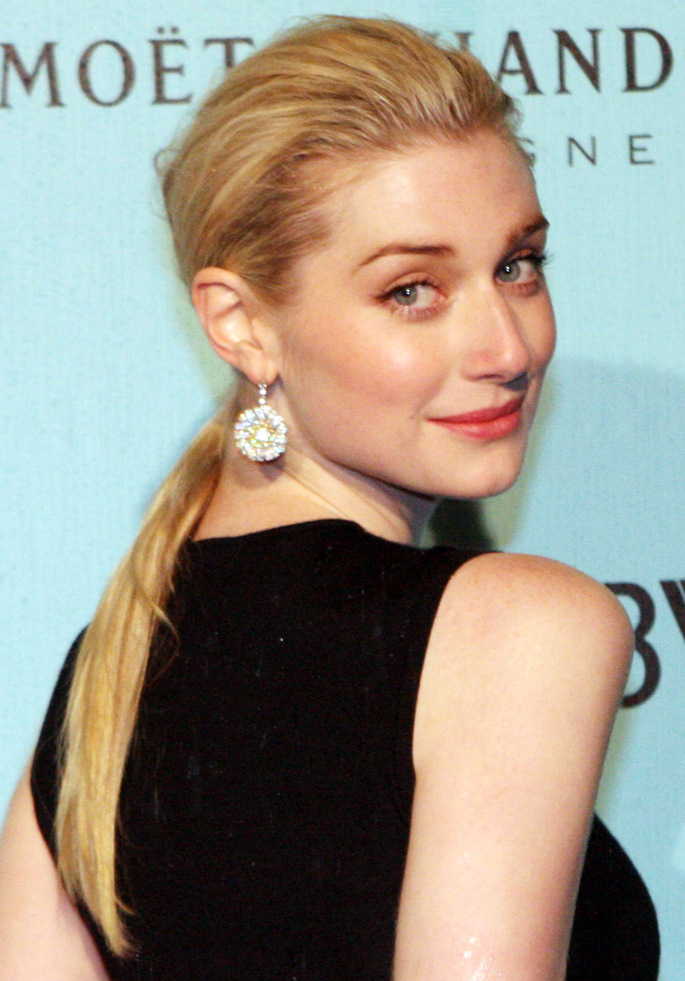
Elizabeth Debicki, Outstanding Supporting Actress in a Drama Series winner

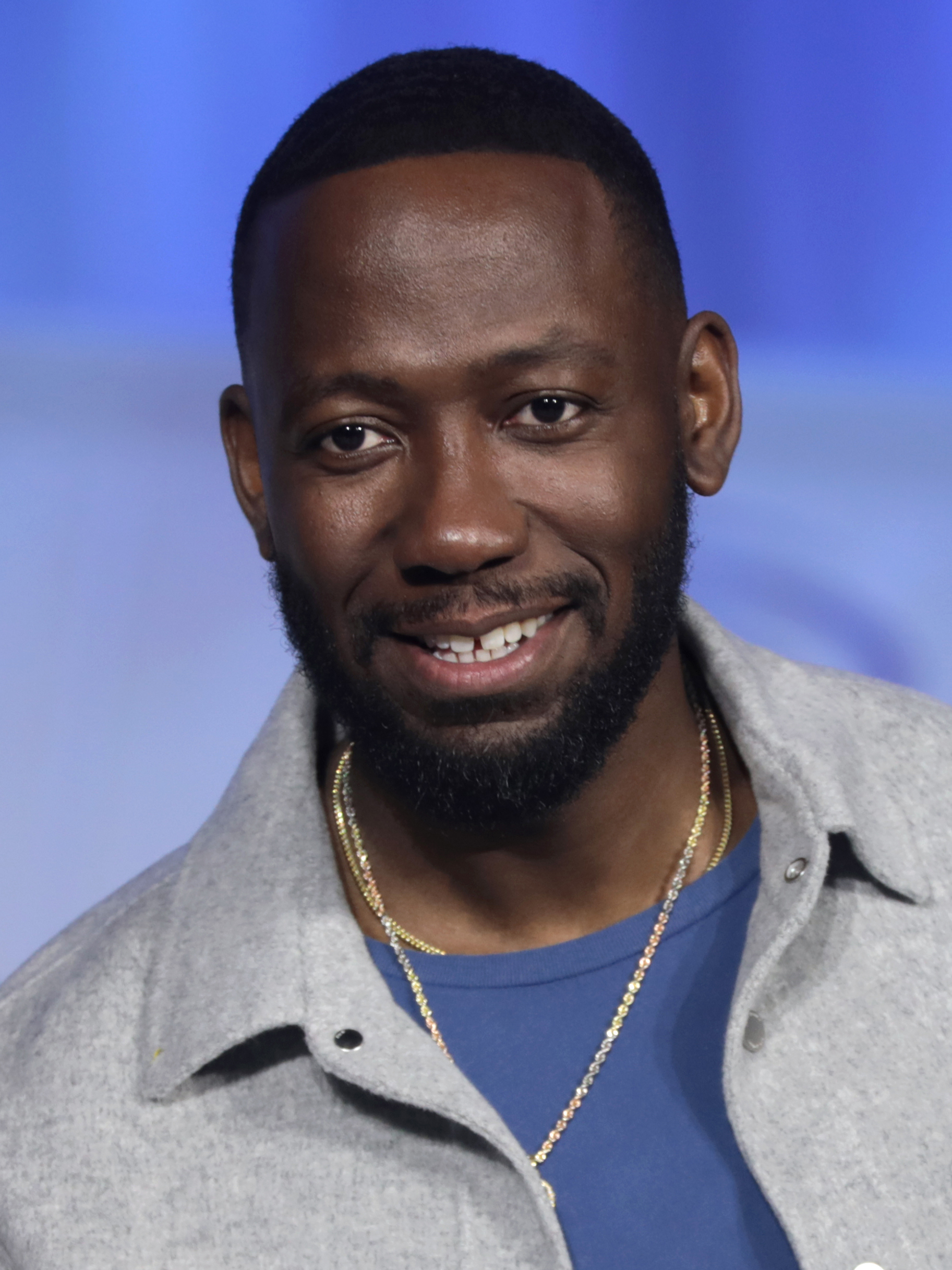
Lamorne Morris, Outstanding Supporting Actor in a Limited or Anthology Series or Movie winner

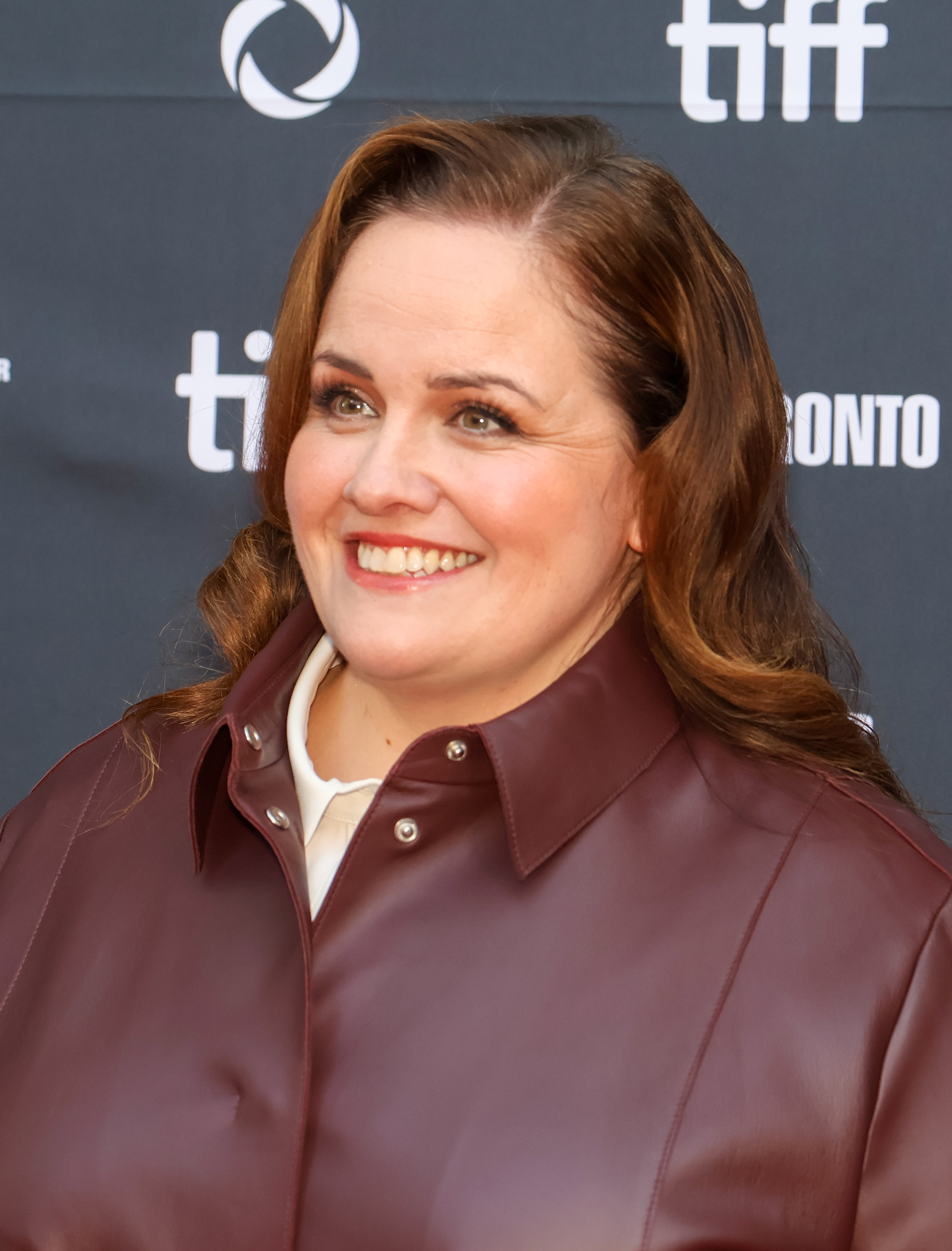
Jessica Gunning, Outstanding Supporting Actress in a Limited or Anthology Series or Movie winner

The nominations for the 76th Primetime Emmy Awards were announced on July 17, 2024, in a virtual broadcast originating from the El Capitan Theatre in Hollywood, Los Angeles, hosted by actor Tony Hale, actress Sheryl Lee Ralph and Television Academy chair Cris Abrego. Including nominations at the 76th Primetime Creative Arts Emmy Awards, Shōgun led all programs with 25 nominations. It was also the second non-English language series to be nominated for Outstanding Drama Series after Squid Game, which was nominated two years earlier. The Bear became the most-nominated comedy series for a single season in the awards' history with 23 nominations; the program surpassed the record held by the NBC comedy 30 Rock, which received 22 nominations in 2009. Lily Gladstone of the series Under the Bridge and Kali Reis of the series True Detective: Night Country became the first indigenous American women to receiving acting nominations; along with D'Pharaoh Woon-A-Tai of the series Reservation Dogs, they were the first indigenous American actors to earn an acting nomination since August Schellenberg for his role in the television film Bury My Heart at Wounded Knee in 2007. Netflix led all networks and platforms with 107 nominations. FX came in second place with 93 nominations, surpassing its own record of 56 nominations in 2016.

The winners were announced on September 15, following the Creative Arts Emmys on September 7 and 8. With 36 total wins, FX led all networks and platforms for the first time. Shōgun became the first non-English-language series to win Outstanding Drama Series and won a total of 18 awards, breaking the record of 13 set by John Adams in 2008 to become the most awarded program for a single year in Emmy history. It also passed Game of Thrones's 12 wins in 2015, 2016, and 2019 for most wins by a drama series in a single season. With its 11 wins, The Bear surpassed its own record for most wins for a comedy series in a single year. For their work on Shōgun, Hiroyuki Sanada and Anna Sawai were the first Japanese performers to win Outstanding Lead Actor in a Drama Series and Outstanding Lead Actress in a Drama Series, respectively. Sawai also became the first Asian to win her category, while Sanada became the second Asian to do so in his category after Lee Jung-jae for his role in Squid Game in 2022. Liza Colón-Zayas was the first Latina winner for Outstanding Supporting Actress in a Comedy Series for her performance on The Bear.

Winners are listed first, highlighted in boldface, and indicated with a double dagger (‡). (Note: The outlets listed for each program are the U.S. broadcasters or streaming services identified in the nominations, which for some international productions are different than the broadcaster(s) that originally commissioned the program. Programs broadcast by HBO or Max were listed under both services in the nominations list; only the original broadcaster is listed below.) For simplicity, producers who received nominations for program awards have been omitted.

=== Programs ===
Programs
**Outstanding Comedy Series**: **Hacks (Max)**‡; Abbott Elementary (ABC); The Bear (FX); Curb Your Enthusiasm (HBO); Only Murders in the Building (Hulu); Palm Royale (Apple TV+); Reservation Dogs (FX); What We Do in the Shadows (FX)	**Outstanding Drama Series**: **Shōgun (FX)**‡; The Crown (Netflix); Fallout (Prime Video); The Gilded Age (HBO); The Morning Show (Apple TV+); Mr. & Mrs. Smith (Prime Video); Slow Horses (Apple TV+); 3 Body Problem (Netflix)
**Outstanding Limited or Anthology Series**: **Baby Reindeer (Netflix)**‡; Fargo (FX); Lessons in Chemistry (Apple TV+); Ripley (Netflix); True Detective: Night Country (HBO)	**Outstanding Reality Competition Program**: **The Traitors (Peacock)**‡; The Amazing Race (CBS); RuPaul's Drag Race (MTV); Top Chef (Bravo); The Voice (NBC)
**Outstanding Talk Series**: **The Daily Show (Comedy Central)**‡; Jimmy Kimmel Live! (ABC); Late Night with Seth Meyers (NBC); The Late Show with Stephen Colbert (CBS)	**Outstanding Scripted Variety Series**: **Last Week Tonight with John Oliver (HBO)**‡; Saturday Night Live (NBC)

=== Acting ===
==== Lead ====
Lead performances
**Outstanding Lead Actor in a Comedy Series**: **Jeremy Allen White – The Bear as Carmen "Carmy" Berzatto (FX)**‡; Matt Berry – What We Do in the Shadows as Leslie "Laszlo" Cravensworth (FX); Larry David – Curb Your Enthusiasm as Larry David (HBO); Steve Martin – Only Murders in the Building as Charles-Haden Savage (Hulu); Martin Short – Only Murders in the Building as Oliver Putnam (Hulu); D'Pharaoh Woon-A-Tai – Reservation Dogs as Bear Smallhill (FX)	**Outstanding Lead Actress in a Comedy Series**: **Jean Smart – Hacks as Deborah Vance (Max)**‡; Quinta Brunson – Abbott Elementary as Janine Teagues (ABC); Ayo Edebiri – The Bear as Sydney Adamu (FX); Selena Gomez – Only Murders in the Building as Mabel Mora (Hulu); Maya Rudolph – Loot as Molly Novak (Apple TV+); Kristen Wiig – Palm Royale as Maxine Simmons (Apple TV+)
**Outstanding Lead Actor in a Drama Series**: **Hiroyuki Sanada – Shōgun as Lord Yoshii Toranaga (FX)**‡; Idris Elba – Hijack as Sam Nelson (Apple TV+); Donald Glover – Mr. & Mrs. Smith as John Smith / Michael (Prime Video); Walton Goggins – Fallout as the Ghoul / Cooper Howard (Prime Video); Gary Oldman – Slow Horses as Jackson Lamb (Apple TV+); Dominic West – The Crown as Charles, Prince of Wales (Netflix)	**Outstanding Lead Actress in a Drama Series**: **Anna Sawai – Shōgun as Toda Mariko (FX)**‡; Jennifer Aniston – The Morning Show as Alex Levy (Apple TV+); Carrie Coon – The Gilded Age as Bertha Russell (HBO); Maya Erskine – Mr. & Mrs. Smith as Jane Smith / Alana (Prime Video); Imelda Staunton – The Crown as Queen Elizabeth II (Netflix); Reese Witherspoon – The Morning Show as Bradley Jackson (Apple TV+)
**Outstanding Lead Actor in a Limited or Anthology Series or Movie**: **Richard Gadd – Baby Reindeer as Donny Dunn (Netflix)**‡; Matt Bomer – Fellow Travelers as Hawkins "Hawk" Fuller (Showtime); Jon Hamm – Fargo as Sheriff Roy Tillman (FX); Tom Hollander – Feud: Capote vs. The Swans as Truman Capote (FX); Andrew Scott – Ripley as Tom Ripley (Netflix)	**Outstanding Lead Actress in a Limited or Anthology Series or Movie**: **Jodie Foster – True Detective: Night Country as Detective Elizabeth Danvers (HBO)**‡; Brie Larson – Lessons in Chemistry as Elizabeth Zott (Apple TV+); Juno Temple – Fargo as Dorothy "Dot" Lyon (FX); Sofía Vergara – Griselda as Griselda Blanco (Netflix); Naomi Watts – Feud: Capote vs. The Swans as Babe Paley (FX)

==== Supporting ====
Supporting performances
**Outstanding Supporting Actor in a Comedy Series**: **Ebon Moss-Bachrach – The Bear as Richard "Richie" Jerimovich (FX)**‡; Lionel Boyce – The Bear as Marcus Brooks (FX); Paul W. Downs – Hacks as Jimmy LuSaque Jr. (Max); Paul Rudd – Only Murders in the Building as Ben Glenroy (Hulu); Tyler James Williams – Abbott Elementary as Gregory Eddie (ABC); Bowen Yang – Saturday Night Live as various characters (NBC)	**Outstanding Supporting Actress in a Comedy Series**: **Liza Colón-Zayas – The Bear as Tina Marrero (FX)**‡; Carol Burnett – Palm Royale as Norma Dellacorte (Apple TV+); Hannah Einbinder – Hacks as Ava Daniels (Max); Janelle James – Abbott Elementary as Ava Coleman (ABC); Sheryl Lee Ralph – Abbott Elementary as Barbara Howard (ABC); Meryl Streep – Only Murders in the Building as Loretta Durkin (Hulu)
**Outstanding Supporting Actor in a Drama Series**: **Billy Crudup – The Morning Show as Cory Ellison (Apple TV+)**‡; Tadanobu Asano – Shōgun as Kashigi Yabushige (FX); Mark Duplass – The Morning Show as Charles "Chip" Black (Apple TV+); Jon Hamm – The Morning Show as Paul Marks (Apple TV+); Takehiro Hira – Shōgun as Ishido Kazunari (FX); Jack Lowden – Slow Horses as River Cartwright (Apple TV+); Jonathan Pryce – The Crown as Prince Philip, Duke of Edinburgh (Netflix)	**Outstanding Supporting Actress in a Drama Series**: **Elizabeth Debicki – The Crown as Diana, Princess of Wales (Netflix)**‡; Christine Baranski – The Gilded Age as Agnes van Rhijn (HBO); Nicole Beharie – The Morning Show as Christina Hunter (Apple TV+); Greta Lee – The Morning Show as Stella Bak (Apple TV+); Lesley Manville – The Crown as Princess Margaret (Netflix); Karen Pittman – The Morning Show as Mia Jordan (Apple TV+); Holland Taylor – The Morning Show as Cybil Richards (Apple TV+)
**Outstanding Supporting Actor in a Limited or Anthology Series or Movie**: **Lamorne Morris – Fargo as State Trooper Whitley "Witt" Farr (FX)**‡; Jonathan Bailey – Fellow Travelers as Tim Laughlin (Showtime); Robert Downey Jr. – The Sympathizer as Claude / Professor Robert Hammer / Ned Godwin / Niko Damianos / The Priest (HBO); Tom Goodman-Hill – Baby Reindeer as Darrien O'Connor (Netflix); John Hawkes – True Detective: Night Country as Hank Prior (HBO); Lewis Pullman – Lessons in Chemistry as Calvin Evans (Apple TV+); Treat Williams – Feud: Capote vs. The Swans as Bill Paley (FX) (posthumous)	**Outstanding Supporting Actress in a Limited or Anthology Series or Movie**: **Jessica Gunning – Baby Reindeer as Martha Scott (Netflix)**‡; Dakota Fanning – Ripley as Marge Sherwood (Netflix); Lily Gladstone – Under the Bridge as Cam Bentland (Hulu); Aja Naomi King – Lessons in Chemistry as Harriet Sloane (Apple TV+); Diane Lane – Feud: Capote vs. The Swans as Nancy "Slim" Keith (FX); Nava Mau – Baby Reindeer as Teri (Netflix); Kali Reis – True Detective: Night Country as Detective Evangeline Navarro (HBO)

=== Directing ===
Directing
**Outstanding Directing for a Comedy Series**: **The Bear: "Fishes" – Christopher Storer (FX)**‡; Abbott Elementary: "Party" – Randall Einhorn (ABC); The Bear: "Honeydew" – Ramy Youssef (FX); The Gentlemen: "Refined Aggression" – Guy Ritchie (Netflix); Hacks: "Bulletproof" – Lucia Aniello (Max); The Ms. Pat Show: "I'm the Pappy" – Mary Lou Belli (BET+)	**Outstanding Directing for a Drama Series**: **Shōgun: "Crimson Sky" – Frederick E. O. Toye (FX)**‡; The Crown: "Sleep, Dearie Sleep" – Stephen Daldry (Netflix); The Morning Show: "The Overview Effect" – Mimi Leder (Apple TV+); Mr. & Mrs. Smith: "First Date" – Hiro Murai (Prime Video); Slow Horses: "Strange Games" – Saul Metzstein (Apple TV+); Winning Time: The Rise of the Lakers Dynasty: "Beat L.A." – Salli Richardson-Whitfield (HBO)
**Outstanding Directing for a Limited or Anthology Series or Movie**: **Ripley – Steven Zaillian (Netflix)**‡; Baby Reindeer: "Episode 4" – Weronika Tofilska (Netflix); Fargo: "The Tragedy of the Commons" – Noah Hawley (FX); Feud: Capote vs. The Swans: "Pilot" – Gus Van Sant (FX); Lessons in Chemistry: "Poirot" – Millicent Shelton (Apple TV+); True Detective: Night Country – Issa López (HBO)

=== Writing ===
Writing
**Outstanding Writing for a Comedy Series**: **Hacks: "Bulletproof" – Lucia Aniello, Paul W. Downs, and Jen Statsky (Max)**‡; Abbott Elementary: "Career Day" – Quinta Brunson (ABC); The Bear: "Fishes" – Christopher Storer and Joanna Calo (FX); Girls5eva: "Orlando" – Meredith Scardino and Sam Means (Netflix); The Other Two: "Brooke Hosts a Night of Undeniable Good" – Chris Kelly and Sarah Schneider (Max); What We Do in the Shadows: "Pride Parade" – Jake Bender and Zach Dunn (FX)	**Outstanding Writing for a Drama Series**: **Slow Horses: "Negotiating with Tigers" – Will Smith (Apple TV+)**‡; The Crown: "Ritz" – Peter Morgan and Meriel Sheibani-Clare (Netflix); Fallout: "The End" – Geneva Robertson-Dworet and Graham Wagner (Prime Video); Mr. & Mrs. Smith: "First Date" – Francesca Sloane and Donald Glover (Prime Video); Shōgun: "Anjin" – Rachel Kondo and Justin Marks (FX); Shōgun: "Crimson Sky" – Rachel Kondo and Caillin Puente (FX)
**Outstanding Writing for a Limited or Anthology Series or Movie**: **Baby Reindeer – Richard Gadd (Netflix)**‡; Black Mirror: "Joan Is Awful" – Charlie Brooker (Netflix); Fargo: "The Tragedy of the Commons" – Noah Hawley (FX); Fellow Travelers: "You're Wonderful" – Ron Nyswaner (Showtime); Ripley – Steven Zaillian (Netflix); True Detective: Night Country: "Part 6" – Issa López (HBO)	**Outstanding Writing for a Variety Special**: **Alex Edelman: Just for Us – Alex Edelman (HBO)**‡; Jacqueline Novak: Get on Your Knees – Jacqueline Novak (Netflix); John Early: Now More Than Ever – John Early (HBO); Mike Birbiglia: The Old Man and the Pool – Mike Birbiglia (Netflix); The Oscars – Jamie Abrahams, Rory Albanese, Amberia Allen, Tony Barbieri, Jonathan Bines, Joelle Boucai, Bryan Cook, Blaire Erskine, Devin Field, Gary Greenberg, Josh Halloway, Eric Immerman, Jesse Joyce, Jimmy Kimmel, Carol Leifer, Jon Macks, Mitch Marchand, Gregory Martin, Jesse McLaren, Molly McNearney, Keaton Patti, Danny Ricker, Louis Virtel, and Troy Walker (ABC)

=== Governors Award ===
The Governors Award was presented to screenwriter, producer and director of film and television Greg Berlanti in recognition of his significant impact on television and culture by depicting the underrepresented in film.

=== Nominations and wins by program ===
For the purposes of the lists below, "major" constitutes the categories listed above (program, acting, directing, and writing), while "total" includes the categories presented at the Creative Arts Emmy Awards. Programs and networks must have multiple wins or major nominations or at least five total nominations to be included.

Programs with multiple nominations
Nominations		Program	Network
Total	Major	Program	Network
25	8	Shōgun	FX
23	9	The Bear	FX
21	6	Only Murders in the Building	Hulu
19	6	True Detective: Night Country	HBO
18	8	The Crown	Netflix
17	2	Saturday Night Live	NBC
16	11	The Morning Show	Apple TV+
16	6	Hacks	Max
16	5	Mr. & Mrs. Smith	Prime Video
16	3	Fallout	Prime Video
15	6	Fargo	FX
13	5	Ripley	Netflix
11	7	Baby Reindeer	Netflix
11	3	Palm Royale	Apple TV+
10	5	Feud: Capote vs. The Swans	FX
10	5	Lessons in Chemistry	Apple TV+
9	7	Abbott Elementary	ABC
9	5	Slow Horses	Apple TV+
8	3	What We Do in the Shadows	FX
8	1	RuPaul's Drag Race	MTV
8	0	Jim Henson Idea Man	Disney+
7	1	The Oscars	ABC
6	3	The Gilded Age	HBO
6	1	Last Week Tonight with John Oliver	HBO
6	1	3 Body Problem	Netflix
6	0	Welcome to Wrexham	FX
5	1	The Amazing Race	CBS
5	1	The Late Show with Stephen Colbert	CBS
5	1	The Voice	NBC
5	1	Winning Time: The Rise of the Lakers Dynasty	HBO
5	0	Ahsoka	Disney+
5	0	Beckham	Netflix
5	0	Dancing with the Stars	ABC
5	0	66th Grammy Awards	CBS
5	0	Planet Earth III	BBC America
5	0	Steve! (Martin) A Documentary in 2 Pieces	Apple TV+
5	0	76th Annual Tony Awards	CBS
<5	3	Fellow Travelers	Showtime
<5	2	Curb Your Enthusiasm	HBO
<5	2	Reservation Dogs	FX

Programs with multiple wins
Wins		Program	Network
Total	Major	Program	Network
18	4	Shōgun	FX
11	4	The Bear	FX
6	4	Baby Reindeer	Netflix
6	0	Saturday Night Live	NBC
5	0	Jim Henson Idea Man	Disney+
4	1	Ripley	Netflix
4	0	Blue Eye Samurai	Netflix
4	0	The Oscars	ABC
3	3	Hacks	Max
3	1	The Crown	Netflix
3	1	The Morning Show	Apple TV+
3	0	Billy Joel: The 100th – Live at Madison Square Garden	CBS
3	0	Only Murders in the Building	Hulu
3	0	Welcome to Wrexham	Hulu
2	1	The Daily Show	Comedy Central
2	1	Last Week Tonight with John Oliver	HBO
2	1	The Traitors	Peacock
2	0	Girls State	Apple TV+
2	0	How I Met Your Father	Hulu
2	0	Love on the Spectrum	Netflix
2	0	Mr. & Mrs. Smith	Prime Video

=== Nominations and wins by network ===
Networks with multiple nominations
Nominations		Network
Total	Major	Network
107	27	Netflix
93	33	FX
91	23	HBO / Max
70	26	Apple TV+
38	9	ABC
38	2	CBS
37	8	Prime Video
33	4	NBC
26	7	Hulu
19	0	Disney+
10	1	MTV
9	1	Peacock
6	1	Bravo
6	0	Fox
6	0	Paramount+
5	1	Comedy Central
5	0	BBC America
<5	3	Showtime

Networks with multiple wins
Wins		Network
Total	Major	Network
36	9	FX
24	6	Netflix
14	6	HBO / Max
9	2	Apple TV+
7	0	ABC
7	0	Disney+
7	0	Hulu
7	0	NBC
5	0	CBS
4	0	Prime Video
3	1	Peacock
2	1	Comedy Central
2	0	National Geographic

== Presenters ==
The following people presented awards or other segments:

Presenters at the ceremony
Name(s)	Role
Steve Martin; Martin Short; Selena Gomez	Presented the award for Outstanding Supporting Actor in a Comedy Series
Colin Farrell	Presented the award for Outstanding Supporting Actor in a Drama Series
George Lopez; Damon Wayans; Jesse Tyler Ferguson	Tribute to TV dads; presented the award for Outstanding Lead Actor in a Comedy Series
Kaitlin Olson; Rob McElhenney	Presented the award for Outstanding Supporting Actress in a Comedy Series
Da'Vine Joy Randolph	Presented the award for Outstanding Supporting Actress in a Drama Series
Candice Bergen	Presented the award for Outstanding Lead Actress in a Comedy Series
Padma Lakshmi; Sam Richardson	Presented the award for Outstanding Reality Competition Program
Kathy Bates; Antony Starr; Giancarlo Esposito	Tribute to TV villains; presented the award for Outstanding Supporting Actress in a Limited or Anthology Series or Movie
Reba McEntire; Melissa Peterman	Presented the award for Outstanding Scripted Variety Series
Seth Meyers; Maya Rudolph; Kristen Wiig; Bowen Yang	Tribute to the 50th anniversary of Saturday Night Live; presented the award for Outstanding Writing for a Variety Special
Gael Garcia Bernal; Diego Luna	Presented the award for Outstanding Directing for a Limited or Anthology Series or Movie
Meredith Baxter; Connie Britton; Susan Kelechi Watson	Tribute to TV moms; presented the award for Outstanding Writing for a Comedy Series
Billy Crystal	Presented the award for Outstanding Talk Series
Nicola Coughlan; Nava Mau	Presented the award for Outstanding Supporting Actor in a Limited or Anthology Series or Movie
Zach Braff; Mindy Kaling; Mekhi Phifer	Tribute to TV doctors; presented the award for Outstanding Writing for a Drama Series
Ebon Moss-Bachrach; Taylor Zakhar Perez	Presented the award for Outstanding Writing for a Limited or Anthology Series or Movie
Ron Howard; Henry Winkler	Tribute to the 50th anniversary of Happy Days; presented the award for Outstanding Directing for a Comedy Series
John Leguizamo	Introduced the chairman of the Television Academy, Cris Abrego
Matt Bomer; Joshua Jackson	Presented the Governors' Award to Greg Berlanti
Jane Lynch; Brendan Hunt; Ilona Maher; Stephen Nedoroscik; Caeleb Dressel; Ezra Frech	Tribute to TV coaches and American Olympic athletes; presented the award for Outstanding Directing for a Drama Series
Jimmy Kimmel	Presented a special tribute to Bob Newhart
Don Johnson; Niecy Nash-Betts; Jimmy Smits	Tribute to TV cops; presented the award for Outstanding Lead Actor in a Limited or Anthology Series or Movie
Lily Gladstone; Greta Lee	Presented the award for Outstanding Lead Actress in a Limited or Anthology Series or Movie
Jean Smart	Presented the award for Outstanding Limited or Anthology Series
Steven Yeun	Presented the award for Outstanding Lead Actor in a Drama Series
Christine Baranski; Viola Davis; Gina Torres	Tribute to TV lawyers; presented the award for Outstanding Lead Actress in a Drama Series
Dule Hill; Allison Janney; Janel Moloney; Richard Schiff; Martin Sheen	Tribute to the 25th anniversary of The West Wing; presented the award for Outstanding Drama Series
Catherine O'Hara	Presented the award for Outstanding Comedy Series

== Ceremony information ==
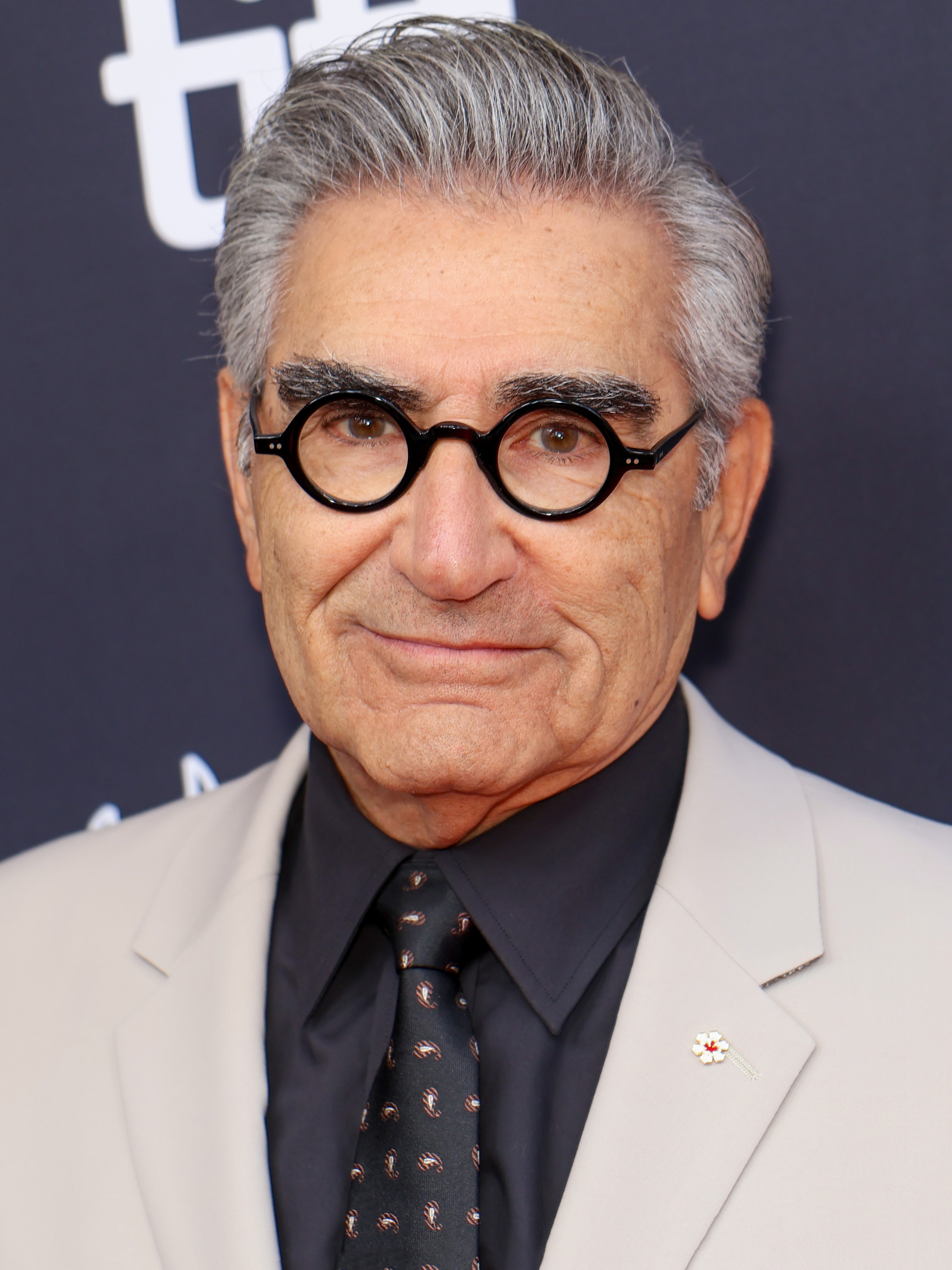
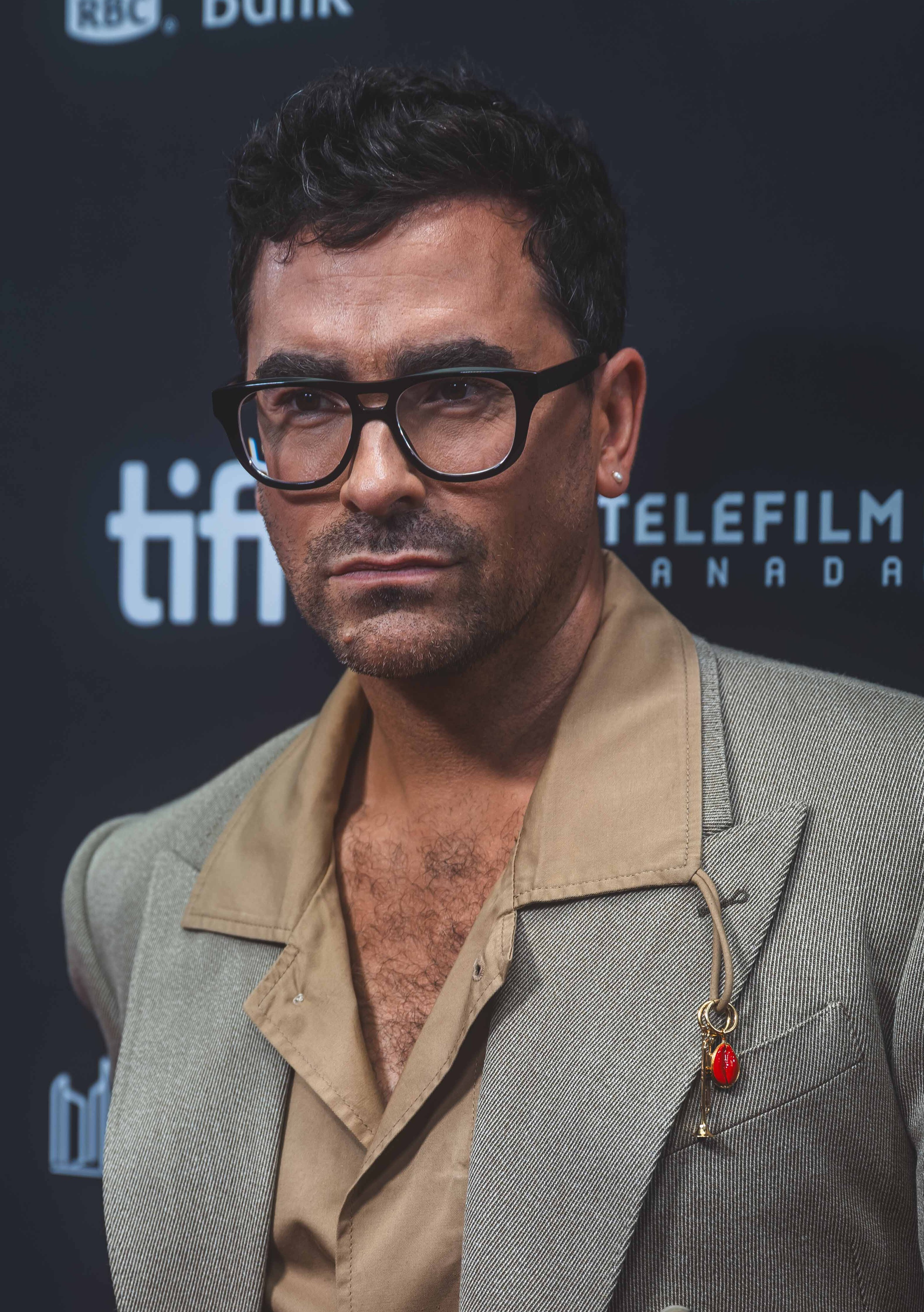
Eugene Levy (left) and Dan Levy co-hosted the 76th Primetime Emmy Awards.

On February 10, 2024, the Academy of Television Arts & Sciences (ATAS, also known as the Television Academy) announced that the 76th Primetime Emmy Awards would be held on September 15; the corresponding Creative Arts ceremonies were announced for September 7 and 8. It was the second Primetime Emmy Awards ceremony held in 2024 due to the 75th ceremony, originally slated to broadcast on September 18, 2023, taking place four months later on January 15, 2024, as a result of the 2023 Hollywood labor disputes. ABC broadcast the gala as part of a four-year rotation deal among the "Big Four" broadcast networks signed in 2018. The broadcast was made available for streaming on Hulu for the week following the ceremony.

The ceremony was produced by Jesse Collins Entertainment (Jesse Collins, Dionne Harmon, and Jeannae Rouzan-Clay) for the second consecutive year. Actor Eugene Levy and his son Dan were announced as co-hosts on August 16. It was the first time a father-and-son duo co-hosted an Emmy ceremony. According to Disney Entertainment chairperson Dana Walden, producers and network executives had asked comedian Jimmy Kimmel – who emceed the previous three ABC telecasts – to host the ceremony. However, Kimmel declined the offer saying he wanted to take a break after hosting the previous Academy Awards. Alex Rudzinski and Rickey Minor served as director and musical director for the ceremony, respectively. Two days before the ceremony, ABC aired a special episode of 20/20 entitled The 76th Emmys: A Night of Firsts. Hosted by Good Morning America co-anchor Robin Roberts, the special featured interviews with Eugene and Dan Levy and several of the ceremony's nominees. Roberts also co-hosted the network's red carpet arrivals special preceding the main telecast with ABC News journalist Will Reeve.

Building from the previous year, producers Collins, Harmon, and Rouzan-Clay announced during a press conference that several of the awards would be presented by actors grouped by "character archetypes", such as TV moms, dads, and villains. Collins also revealed that the telecast would feature reunions in tribute to the 50th anniversaries of NBC variety/sketch program Saturday Night Live and ABC comedy series Happy Days, and the 25th anniversary of NBC drama series The West Wing. In an interview with the Los Angeles Times, Eugene Levy echoed the producers' decision to focus on history and nostalgia, saying, "And [it's] also just paying tribute to television, certainly the nominees, but to the medium that gave us both our starts."

Categories to be shown during the main broadcast were set in July 2024, with Outstanding Variety Special (Live) returning to the Creative Arts ceremony; as part of a rotation agreement with the Writers Guild of America, Outstanding Writing for a Variety Special also replaced Outstanding Writing for a Variety Series at the main ceremony.

=== Critical reviews and viewership ===
The broadcast generally received mixed to negative reviews from critics. Allison Herman of Variety compared the ceremony to the previous one noting, "the 76th Emmys were a far less dynamic and more stilted watch than the January show." She also criticized production elements such as the music director's choices for presenters' walk on music, recurring sound technical issues, and the grouping of presenters based on character archetypes. Ben Travers of IndieWire found Eugene and Dan Levy's performances as hosts underwhelming, which was not helped by their reminder to the audience that "they weren't stand up comedians, but actors acting like hosts." He reserved praise for several presenters such as Candice Bergen, Billy Crystal, and the cast of Only Murders in the Building, but he ultimately found the ceremony to be "another awards show resigned to its diminishing fate." Lili Loofbourow, writing for The Washington Post, found the hosts to be "pleasant but forgettable" and that the onslaught of repeat winners bogged down the ceremony.

In a more positive review, Judy Berman of Time complimented the Levys and said, "The emcees imbued what is always a long night—and was, this time around, full of predictable wins—with many moments of lighthearted fun, without trying too hard to roast their fellow actors or land headline-making zingers." Daniel Fienberg of The Hollywood Reporter called the ceremony "an above-average show", noting that surprise winners kept "audiences on their toes" and that they often gave the best speeches. However, he criticized the reunion tributes noting that the presenters' dialogue felt bland and poor written in comparison to the prior ceremony's tributes. He also called the choice of Jelly Roll's performance of "I Am Not Okay" "tonally questionable" and wrote that Jimmy Kimmel's tribute to comedian Bob Newhart "absolutely warped the mood in a room that wasn't sure if this was the time to laugh about how often Jon Stewart wins Emmys." Robert Lloyd wrote in the Los Angeles Times that the telecast was a "sweet, positive show that at the same time avoided the air of self-congratulation". He noted the Levys' "father-and-son dynamic", with Dan's role as "the hipper son" and Eugene as the "befuddled dad", was at the heart of their shared time together.

Competing with a Sunday Night Football game on NBC, the ceremony was viewed by 6.9 million people in the United States, making it the most-viewed Emmys in three years, representing a 54% increase over the previous year's ceremony. It also achieved a 1.03 rating among adults ages 18–49.

== In Memoriam ==
The In Memoriam tribute, which featured singer Jelly Roll performing his song "I Am Not Okay", paid tribute to the following individuals:

- Martin Mull – performer
- Joyce Randolph – performer
- Dan Wilcox – writer
- Robert Butler – director
- Jerry Foley – director
- Jamie Kellner – executive
- Stephanie Leifer – executive
- Eric Gilliland – writer
- Bob Ellison – writer
- Piper Laurie – performer
- E. Duke Vincent – producer
- Jeannie Epper – stunt performer
- Bill Klages – lighting designer
- Terry Carter – performer
- Dr. Ruth Westheimer – host
- Dabney Coleman – performer
- Richard Moll – performer
- Lee Gabler – agent
- Paula Weinstein – producer
- George A. Sunga – producer
- Jac Venza – producer
- Kenneth Patterson – camera operator
- Susan Wojcicki – executive
- Leo Chaloukian – sound designer, Academy president 1989–1993
- Don Buchwald – agent
- George Schenck – writer
- Samm-Art Williams – writer
- Peter Marshall – host
- Rod Holcomb – director
- Frances Sternhagen – performer
- Phil Donahue – host
- Louis Gossett Jr. – performer
- Martin Starger – producer
- Ryan O'Neal – performer
- Andrea Fay Friedman – performer
- Gena Rowlands – performer
- Richard Simmons – TV personality
- Shannen Doherty – performer
- Robert MacNeil – journalist
- Chance Perdomo – performer
- Carl Weathers – performer
- Richard Lewis – performer
- Donald Sutherland – performer
- James Earl Jones – performer
- Bob Newhart – performer

At the end of the tribute, comedian and talk show host Jimmy Kimmel briefly eulogized Newhart.
