= Enemies (upcoming film) =

- Directed by: Henry Dunham
- Written by: Henry Dunham
- Produced by: Ari Aster; Lars Knudsen; Alejandro De Leon
- Starring: Jeremy Allen White; Austin Butler; Anna Sawai; Hidetoshi Nishijima
- Cinematography: Shabier Kirchner
- Edited by: Joshua Raymond Lee
- Music by: Hildur Guðnadóttir
- Production company: Square Peg
- Distributed by: A24
- Country: United States
- Language: English

Enemies is an upcoming American crime film written and directed by Henry Dunham and starring Jeremy Allen White and Austin Butler.

== Premise ==
A detective has a battle-of-wits in pursuit of a fugitive contract killer.

== Cast ==
- Jeremy Allen White
- Austin Butler
- Anna Sawai
- Hidetoshi Nishijima
- Payman Maadi
- Franz Rogowski
- Charles Parnell

== Production ==
The film was written and directed by Henry Dunham for A24. Ari Aster and Lars Knudsen of Square Peg are producers, alongside Alejandro De Leon for A24.

It was announced in May 2025 that Jeremy Allen White, Austin Butler, Anna Sawai, and Hidetoshi Nishijima are in the cast.

Principal photography took place in Chicago in the summer of 2025, beginning at the end of May.
