= Confessions of an Action Star =

- Directed by: Brad Martin
- Written by: David Leitch
- Produced by: Todd Grossman; Zachary Kahn; Alan D. Lee; Jeanine Rohn; Bobby Sheng; Karen Mayeda Vranek; Nina Yang; Steve D. Yang
- Starring: David Leitch; Angelina Jolie; Carrie-Anne Moss; Hugo Weaving; Eric Roberts; Dax Shepard; Debbie Allen; Lee Arenberg
- Cinematography: Bridger Nielson
- Edited by: Art Chudabala; Mark David; Todd Grossman; Mark Hosack
- Music by: Christopher Lennertz
- Distributed by: Vivendi Entertainment; Lightyear Entertainment
- Release dates: January 23, 2005 (Slamdance); January 20, 2009 (United States)
- Running time: 83 minutes
- Country: United States
- Language: English

Confessions of an Action Star is a 2005 American action comedy mockumentary film directed by Brad Martin and starring David Leitch, Angelina Jolie, Carrie-Anne Moss, Hugo Weaving, Eric Roberts, Dax Shepard, Debbie Allen, Lee Arenberg. The film was titled Sledge: The Untold Story during its film festival run and is distributed by Vivendi Entertainment and Lightyear Entertainment.

== Plot ==
A 'mockumentary' on the rise and fall of chippendale dancer turned martial arts action star, Francis Allen Sledgewick, AKA Frank Sledge. When fame and fortune caused Frank to lose his sense of what's truly important, he realised he's going to have to get in touch with his roots if there's ever going to be a comeback.

== Cast ==
- Holmes Osborne as Richard Orchid (as Homes Osborne)
- David Leitch as Frank Sledge
- Nathan Lee Graham as Glen Jefferies
- Angelina Jolie as herself
- Hugo Weaving as himself
- Kelly Hu as herself / Undercover Cop
- Carrie-Anne Moss as herself / Girlfriend in movie
- Ernie Hudson as himself / Commander
- Debbie Allen as herself / Deity
- Michael T. Weiss as Drug Lord (as Michael T. Wiess)
- Mitchell Gaylord as Brother (as Mitch Gaylord)
- Matt McColm as Commander
- Eric Roberts as himself / Police Chief
- Lin Shaye as Samantha Jones
- Richard Lewis as himself
- Lee Arenberg as Barry Simpson
- Kyle Reese as Young Frank #1 (as Kyle Reese Cook)
- Dax Shepard as SFX Coordinator
- Sam McMurray as Jack Rumpkin
- Jon Gries as Donald Buckheim
- Joel David Moore as himself / Prisoner
- Sean Young as herself / Honey
- Jason George as himself / Crooked Cop
- Al Leong as Evil Doctor
- Sean Michael Rabbit as Young Frank #2
- Chris Palermo as Russell Gold
- Michal Holub as John Hu (as Michael Holub)
- Josh Nathan as Will Stillwell
- Matthew Dickens as Agent #2
- Ben Falcone as Jerry Moss
- Brett Ratner as himself
- Peter Jason as himself (uncredited)
- Ben Stiller as Commander (uncredited)
