= Don Verdean =

- Theatrical release poster
- Directed by: Jared Hess
- Written by: Jared Hess; Jerusha Hess
- Produced by: Brandt Andersen; David Hunter; Jared Hess; Jason Hatfield
- Starring: Sam Rockwell; Amy Ryan; Jemaine Clement; Leslie Bibb; Will Forte; Danny McBride
- Cinematography: Mattias Troelstrup
- Edited by: Tanner Christensen
- Music by: Ilan Eshkeri
- Production company: Buffalo Film Company
- Distributed by: Lionsgate Premiere
- Release dates: January 28, 2015 (Sundance); December 11, 2015 (United States)
- Running time: 90 minutes
- Country: United States
- Language: English
- Box office: $31,309

Don Verdean is a 2015 American comedy film directed by Jared Hess and written by Jared Hess and Jerusha Hess. The film stars Sam Rockwell, Amy Ryan, Jemaine Clement, Will Forte, and Danny McBride. The film had a limited theatrical release and was made available through video on demand on December 11, 2015, by Lionsgate Premiere.

== Plot ==
Don Verdean is a Biblical Archaeologist who searches for items that can prove that the stories from the Bible are true. The film opens to what seems to be an old VHS tape showing Verdean's archaeological achievements, all of which have no substantial proof and are based on anecdotal evidence. It cuts to Verdean at a church giving a lecture on his iron shears which he believes were used to cut Samson's hair. A man stands up and reads a letter from the Israeli Antiquities Authority that states that Verdean had no legal authority to be excavating in Israel, that his actions were illegal, and any archaeological findings should be published in professional journals.

Verdean responds by saying Satan is at work and the Israelis are covering up the truth to prevent a bloodbath. Verdean proceeds to open his book to a page with him and another man. The other man he claims to be Nahum Ishalom, the spokesman for the Israeli Antiquities and author of the letter that the man just read. This causes the congregation to start clapping, including the man who read the letter but he still seemed skeptical. Afterward, at the meet-and-greet in the Church's lobby, a man hands Verdean's assistant, Carol Jensen, a business card from Tony Lazarus and says Lazarus wants to meet Verdean. Carol informs Verdean that Lazarus wants to meet him as they are loading their wares into their RV. Verdean tells Carol about Lazarus's conversion from being a sinner who was driving with a hooker when he got into a car accident and died 10 years prior, with Verdean stating Lazarus's soul left his body. Verdean then states God sent him back like a modern-day Lazarus of Bethany.

Lazarus then married the hooker and they started their own ministry. The next morning Verdean meets Lazarus at his Church where Lazarus introduces his wife Joylinda Lazarus. Lazarus informs Verdean that Church attendance has been down and Lazarus needs a boost because of a new neighboring Church ran by an ex-Satanist that is taking all his parishioners. Verdean tells Lazarus he has found a salt statue of Lot's wife and Lazarus wants it. Verdean calls Boaz (Jemaine Clement) who is in Israel and tells him he needs him to ship the statue to him in the United States. Boaz has forgotten where it is but says he will find it and hangs up the phone. The shipment arrives but when they open the box, the statue inside looks like something with a penis. Everyone looks surprised and Lazarus states it does not look like the picture that Verdean had shown him. Verdean states that Lot's wife must have been a hermaphrodite which explains why she did not want to leave Sodom.

Lazarus buys this but Verdean calls Boaz, extremely upset, and demands that Boaz send him the statue he had shown him earlier. Lazarus unveils the statue to a bewildered audience when a man stands up and claps. After the sermon Pastor Fontaine (Will Forte) shows up and asks to carbon date the statue, which Verdean declines stating that carbon dating is not reliable and Fontaine leaves. It cuts to Verdean and Carol at a diner eating and Carol tells Verdean about her son, who is in prison for growing marijuana. Later Lazarus tells Verdean he wants more artifacts. Verdean says he can find Goliath's skull and Lazarus thinks this is a great idea. Verdean and Carol fly to Israel where they meet Boaz and start digging for the skull. Israeli Police show up and start yelling at them in Hebrew which Boaz attempts to translate. The police officer states that they need a permit to dig and if they do not fill the hole in they are all going to jail. Later, Verdean is speaking with Lazarus over the phone and Lazarus tells Verdean he needs the skull as soon as possible. Verdean then decides to steal the skull of a dead Israeli with gigantism, by the name of Jonny Jerusalem, from his grave. Verdean then knocks out a rock sized hole in the front of the skull and tries to pass it off as being Goliath's skull by burying it out in the desert.

The next day he brings Carol and Boaz to the spot where he buried it the night before. A man from a tour bus sees them dig it up and starts recording them and claiming it was Goliath's skull. Back at the hotel, Boaz confronts Verdean about the unlikelihood of them finding that so quickly. Boaz then sees Johnny Jerusalem on Verdean's laptop and accuses him of being a grave robber. Verdean bribes Boaz to keep his mouth shut and takes Boaz with him to the United States. Boaz keeps blackmailing Verdean in order to get Verdean to do what he wants, including the request for a night with Carol. Verdean asks Carol to meet up with Boaz because Boaz wants to convert to Christianity and they set up a date. Boaz picks up Carol for their date, precedes to ask her questions about the type of men she likes, and asks her to dance. After Boaz says inappropriate things about Carol's son, Carol slaps Boaz and storms out with Boaz yelling that Verdean promised him a night with her. Carol, upset with Verdean, tells Verdean that she quits. Verdean then goes to the dance club and punches Boaz in the face, knocking him onto the ground.

The next day they go to meet the man who Boaz hired, but has not paid, to falsify the lab results on Goliath's fake skull. Not having the $10,000, Boaz pulls a gun on the guy, kidnaps him, and they lock him in a storage locker. Verdean and Boaz start trying to create a fake Holy Grail in order to try and fool a Chinese Christian billionaire who they are trying to con 1 million dollars out of. After several failed attempts, they steal a chalice from an antiques store. Verdean and Boaz pickup Poon-Yen at the airport and board a helicopter, heading to the "secret" location of the Holy Grail. They land wearing bulletproof vests and take Poon-Yen through some caverns until they reach their fake Holy Grail, which greatly impresses Poon-Yen who believes the farce. Poon-Yen is accidentally shot and they all end up at the hospital where Boaz pulls a gun on them and steals the briefcase of money from Poon-Yen's associate who is sitting next to Poon-Yen in the hospital bed.

Verdean tackles Boaz and then the briefcase starts to vibrate while they are wrestling on the ground. Inside the briefcase was a cell phone that Pastor Fontaine was calling and leaves a message saying the cops found the kidnapped lab technician with a GPS tracker Fontaine placed on Verdean and Boaz's car. Verdean and Boaz escape after taking off the GPS tracker and are pursued by the police. Boaz is captured and arrested while Fontaine taunts him as he is placed into custody and drives away. The cops then find Verdean at Carol's house confessing and apologizing to her for his crimes. The police take Verdean away and it cuts to 2 months later. A news woman is outside Fontaine's Church questioning him about misappropriation of Church funds in order to set up Verdean. Verdean was convicted of fraud, larceny, aggravated assault, and accessory to kidnapping. Verdean and Boaz end up in prison together and talk in the yard. Verdean notices a young man sitting alone at a table during dinner and asks if he has a mother named Carol, to which he replies "Yes". Verdean pats him on the shoulder before it cuts to the credits.

== Cast ==
- Sam Rockwell as Don Verdean
- Amy Ryan as Carol
- Jemaine Clement as Boaz
- Danny McBride as Tony Lazarus
- Will Forte as Pastor Fontaine
- Leslie Bibb as Joylinda Lazarus
- Steve Park as Poon-Yen
- Sky Elobar as Dr. Stanley

== Release ==
The film premiered at the Sundance Film Festival on January 28, 2015. On January 21, 2015, Lionsgate acquired distribution rights to the film. The film was released in limited theaters and through video on demand on December 11, 2015, by Lionsgate Premiere.

== Reception ==
Don Verdean received negative reviews. On Rotten Tomatoes, the film holds a score of 29%, an average rating of 4.3/10, based on 38 reviews. Metacritic gives the film a score of 39 out of 100, sampled from 13 reviews, indicating "generally unfavorable" reviews.
