= Anna Sawai =

Japanese actress and singer (born 1992)

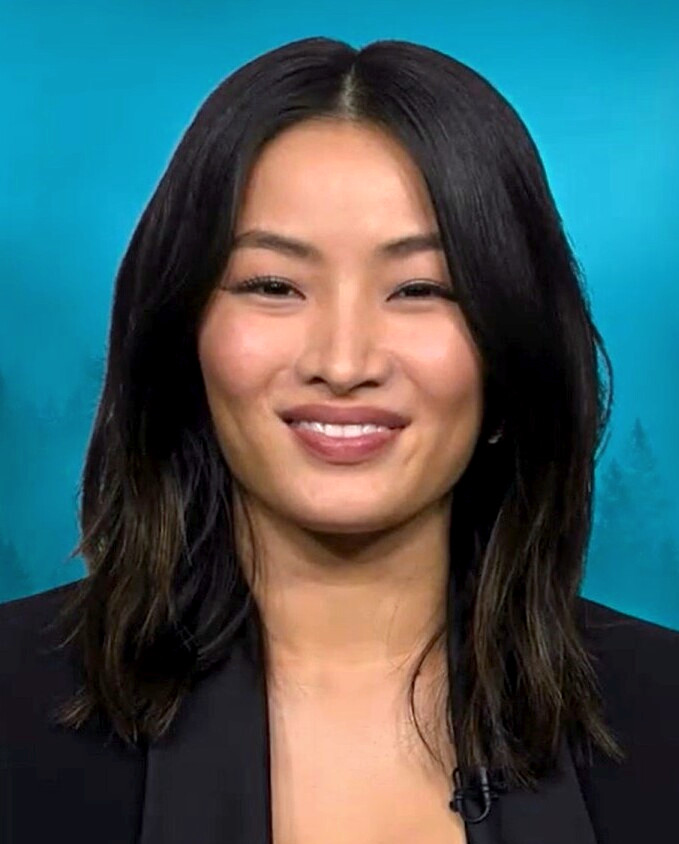
- Sawai in 2024
- Born: June 11, 1992 (age 34); Wellington, New Zealand
- Citizenship: Japan
- Education: Sophia University
- Occupations: Actress; singer
- Years active: 2004–present

Anna Sawai (Note: Sawai is credited in katakana for her music career, but her Japanese acting roles are credited in kanji (澤井 杏奈, Sawai Anna).) (アンナ・サワイ; born June 11, 1992) is a Japanese actress and singer. Born in New Zealand, she moved to Japan with her family at age 10. She landed her first acting role at age 11 as the title character in the 2004 Nippon Television production of Annie. Sawai later made her film debut in James McTeigue's 2009 martial arts film Ninja Assassin.

Sawai rose to fame in Japan as one of the lead vocalists of the girl group Faky. She made a return to acting with a supporting role in the British crime thriller series Giri/Haji. Her international breakthrough came with her role in the Apple TV+ drama series Pachinko. She gained further recognition for starring in the MonsterVerse series Monarch: Legacy of Monsters and in the historical drama series Shōgun. For the latter, she won the Primetime Emmy Award for Outstanding Lead Actress in a Drama Series, becoming the first Japanese actress to win a Primetime Emmy Award, as well as a Golden Globe Award and a Screen Actors Guild Award. In 2024, Time magazine included her on its 100 Next list.

== Early and personal life ==
Anna Sawai was born on June 11, 1992, in Wellington, New Zealand, to parents of Japanese descent. Her mother worked as a piano teacher, while her father worked for an electronics company. From age 3, her mother taught her to play the piano and sing. Her family moved frequently while growing up due to her father's job, living in Hong Kong and the Philippines, before settling in Yokohama, Japan, when Sawai was 10.

Sawai is fluent in English and Japanese, and resides in Tokyo.

== Career ==
=== Early acting roles and Faky (2004–2018) ===
Sawai made her acting debut at age 11 in 2004 in a Tokyo stage production of Annie as the titular character, which was simulcast on Nippon TV. Sawai successfully auditioned for the entertainment conglomerate Avex Inc. in 2006, earning her a management contract and training at their in-house music and dance bootcamp. Following this, Sawai continued her acting career with a minor role in the television drama Our Love Song (2007), and made her Hollywood feature film debut in a supporting role in James McTeigue's martial arts film Ninja Assassin (2009), in which she played Kiriko, a rebellious young ninja.

Sawai continued to receive vocal and dancing lessons throughout high school, and later enrolled at Sophia University. While attending university, Sawai was signed by the Avex Trax record label and in March 2012, she performed the United States national anthem at the Tokyo Dome to begin the 2012 Major League Baseball season. A month later, Sawai was announced as one of the members of the girl group ARA, an acronym for Avex Rising Angels, and that November they released the music video for their first and only single "Make My Dreams Come True". The group disbanded in early 2013 after less than a year of promotions, but in July that year, Avex announced that Sawai would be re-debuting as one of the lead vocalists for the girl group Faky under the Rhythm Zone record label. They debuted with the single "Better Without You" on July 29, 2013.

While performing as a member of Faky, Sawai participated in a number of solo projects. In October 2015, she appeared as the lead actress in Elliott Yamin's music video for his song "Katy". Sawai was a featured artist alongside fellow bandmate Akina on Yamato's debut single "Shining", which was released on April 26, 2017. Later that year, Sawai had a voice role as Angélique Noir in the 2017 fashion simulation video game Style Savvy: Styling Star and performed the main theme song for the game "Girls Be Ambitious". In 2018, she made a return to acting with a supporting role in the coming-of-age mystery series Colors, appearing in two episodes. In May 2018, she appeared as a dancer in a limited run stage production of The Book, directed by Fuko Takenaka, as part of the Think Tank Bang dance art collective.

On November 16, 2018, Faky announced Sawai's departure from the group, citing her desire to focus on her acting career. She performed with the group for the last time on December 20 as part of their Four headline tour.

=== Breakthrough in television (2019–2024) ===
In 2019, Sawai portrayed Eiko, the daughter of a Yakuza boss, in the British crime thriller series Giri/Haji. The series premiered on BBC Two in October to critical acclaim. That same year, Sawai was cast as martial arts warrior Elle Lue in F9, the ninth film in the Fast & Furious franchise, directed by Justin Lin. Following her casting announcement, Sawai signed with WME. Filming for F9 took place between June and November 2019, and the film was released on May 19, 2021, to mixed reviews. F9 set several pandemic box office records with worldwide earnings of $726 million.

Since 2022, Sawai has portrayed the main role of Naomi in the Apple TV+ adaptation of Pachinko, based on the novel of the same name by Min Jin Lee. Naomi is an original character created for the series. The show debuted on March 25, 2022, to critical acclaim; the following month it was renewed for a second season. The ensemble cast of the series won an Independent Spirit Award. In June 2022, Sawai was cast as Cate Randa, the lead role in Legendary's MonsterVerse television series Monarch: Legacy of Monsters. The show is a spin-off of the 2014 film Godzilla, and premiered on Apple TV+ on November 17, 2023, to positive critical reception.

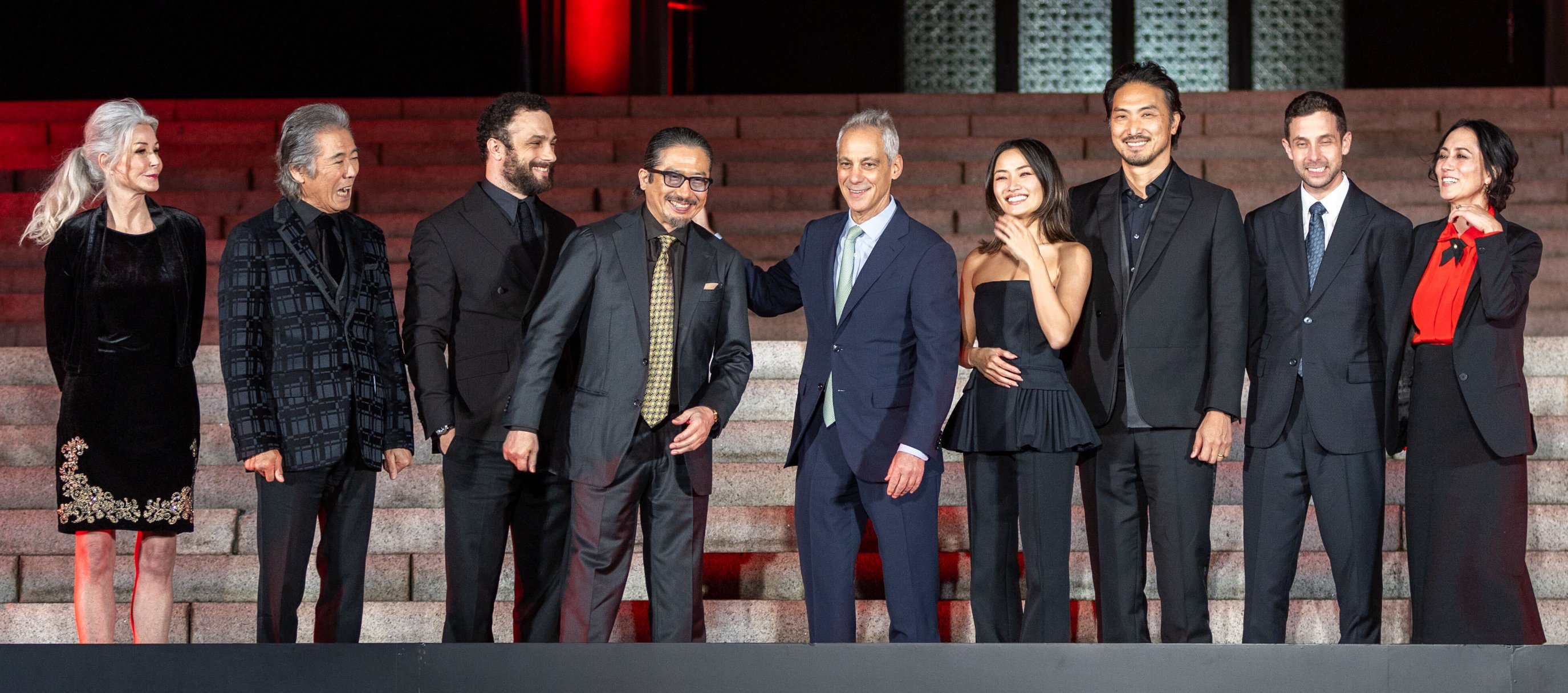
Sawai with the cast and crew of Shōgun in 2024

In September 2021, Sawai was cast as the female lead, Lady Mariko, in the FX limited series Shōgun, based on the novel by James Clavell. The series premiered in February 2024, and Sawai's performance received critical acclaim. The New York Times said Sawai "is thoroughly convincing and captivating as Mariko," and Rolling Stone said Sawai "speaks volumes with every pained look on Mariko’s face". RogerEbert.com called her performance "revelatory", and Entertainment Weekly praised Sawai for evolving the role past the 1980 version with "steely strength and spirited temper befitting a more modern audience". The Hollywood Reporter identified the performance as a career achievement for the actress: "Sawai has been tip-toeing around full-fledged stardom for several years with supporting roles ... but this feels like her arrival. The actress inhabits Mariko so fully as a fragile, wavering soul and a stealthy badass."

In 2024, she received the Primetime Emmy Award for Outstanding Lead Actress in a Drama Series for her role in Shōgun, making her the first Japanese actress to win any Primetime Emmy, and the first actress of Asian descent to win that Primetime Emmy category. In 2025, she won the Golden Globe Award for Best Actress – Television Series Drama. In 2025, Variety named Sawai's performance in Shōgun as one of the greatest TV performances in the 21st century.

In September 2024, Sawai was chosen as brand ambassador for jewelry designer Cartier. In December of the same year, WWD honored her with the magazine's inaugural Fashion Newcomer Style Award. In February 2025, fashion design house Dior named Sawai a brand ambassador.

=== Transition to film (2025–present) ===
Sawai co-stars in the heist film How to Rob a Bank, directed by David Leitch, released on November 13, 2026. Sawai will co-star in Enemies, opposite Austin Butler and Jeremy Allen White. She will also co-star in (Saint) Peter, a comedy-drama written and directed by Josh Klausner.

Sawai will portray Yoko Ono in The Beatles – A Four-Film Cinematic Event, a series of interconnected biopics directed by Sam Mendes and due to be released in April 2028. On taking the high-profile role, Sawai said: "It’s just exciting because her story is so inspirational to me, and people really don’t know the true person that she was. She’s an incredible artist. And also, she just was an independent woman and people didn’t like that. They wanted John (Lennon) for themselves and she was an easy target. And I think it’s very meaningful for me to be able to tell her story."

== Filmography ==
Key
†	Denotes productions that have not yet been released

=== Film ===
Year	Title	Role	Notes	Ref.
2009	Ninja Assassin	Kiriko		
2021	F9	Elle Lue		
2026	How to Rob a Bank	Emi		
2028	The Beatles – A Four-Film Cinematic Event †	Yoko Ono	Filming	
TBA	Enemies †	TBA	Post-production	
TBA	(Saint) Peter †	Sister Theresa	Post-production	
TBA	Slime †	TBA (voice)	In production	

=== Television ===
Year	Title	Role	Notes	Ref.
2007	Our Love Song	Natsu	1 episode	
2018	Colors	Train station accuser	2 episodes	
2019	Giri/Haji	Eiko Fukuhara	Main role, 6 episodes	
2022–2024	Pachinko	Naomi	Main role, 11 episodes	
2023–present	Monarch: Legacy of Monsters	Cate Randa	Main role, 20 episodes	
2024	Shōgun	Toda Mariko	Main role, 10 episodes	
2025	Star Wars: Visions	Bounty hunter Sevn (voice)	1 episode	

=== Music videos ===
Year	Title	Artist	Role	Ref.
2015	"Katy"	Elliot Yamin	Lead role	

=== Video games ===
Year	Title	Voice role	Notes	Ref.
2017	Style Savvy: Styling Star	Angélique Noir	North American and PAL versions	

=== Stage credits ===
Year	Production	Role	Venue	Ref.
2004	Annie	Annie	Aoyama Theatre	
2018	The Book	Dancer	Owlspot Theatre	

=== Modeling and magazine features ===
Year	Publication/Campaign	Featured as:	Ref
2024	Emmy	Cover/Shogun	
2024	Hollywood Reporter	Cover/THR Roundtable	
2024	W	Cover/interview	
2025	Perfect	Cover/interview	

== Awards and nominations ==
Award	Year	Category	Nominated work	Result	Ref.
Astra TV Awards	2024	Best Actress in a Streaming Drama Series	Shōgun	Won	
AACTA International Awards	2025	Best Actress in a Series	Shōgun	Nominated	
Cooler Awards	2024	Lead Actress in a Drama Series	Shōgun	Won	
Critics' Choice Awards	2025	Best Actress in a Drama Series	Shōgun	Nominated	
Critics' Choice Awards	2025	Best Supporting Actress in a Drama Series	Pachinko	Nominated	
Dorian Awards	2024	Best Television Performance – Drama	Shōgun	Nominated	
Gold Derby Awards	2024	Best Drama Actress – Television	Shōgun	Won	
Gold Derby Awards	2024	Ensemble of the Year	Shōgun	Nominated	
Gold Derby Awards	2024	Performer of the Year	Herself	Nominated	
Gold Derby Awards	2024	Breakthrough Performer of the Year	Herself	Won	
Golden Globe Awards	2025	Best Actress in a Television Series – Drama	Shōgun	Won	
Gotham TV Awards	2024	Outstanding Performance in a Limited Series	Shōgun	Nominated	
Independent Spirit Awards	2023	Best Ensemble Cast in a New Scripted Series	Pachinko	Won	
Independent Spirit Awards	2025	Best Lead Performance in a New Scripted Series	Shōgun	Nominated	
Pena de Prata	2022	Best Ensemble in a Drama Series	Pachinko	Nominated	
Primetime Emmy Awards	2024	Outstanding Lead Actress in a Drama Series	Shōgun	Won	
Satellite Awards	2025	Best Actress – Television Series Drama	Shōgun	Nominated	
Saturn Awards	2025	Best Supporting Actress in a Television Series	Monarch: Legacy of Monsters	Nominated	
Screen Actors Guild Awards	2025	Outstanding Performance by a Female Actor in a Drama Series	Shōgun	Won	
Screen Actors Guild Awards	2025	Outstanding Performance by an Ensemble in a Drama Series	Shōgun	Won	
Television Critics Association Awards	2024	Individual Achievement in Drama	Shōgun	Won	

She was named one of Time’s Women of the Year for 2025.
