= How to Rob a Bank (2026 film) =

American film by David Leitch

- Theatrical release poster
- Directed by: David Leitch
- Written by: Mark Bianculli
- Produced by: Brian Grazer; Jeb Brody; Allan Mandelbaum; David Leitch; Kelly McCormick
- Starring: Nicholas Hoult; Zoë Kravitz; Anna Sawai; Rhenzy Feliz; Paul Sparks; Young Mazino; Tati Gabrielle; Christian Slater; Pete Davidson; John C. Reilly
- Cinematography: Jonathan Sela
- Edited by: Elisabet Ronaldsdottir
- Music by: Dom Lewis
- Production companies: Metro-Goldwyn-Mayer; Imagine Entertainment; 87North Productions
- Distributed by: Amazon MGM Studios (Canada/United States); Sony Pictures Releasing International (International) (Note: excludes Japan)
- Release date: November 13, 2026 (United States)
- Running time: 122 minutes
- Country: United States
- Language: English
- Budget: $40–60 million
- Box office: $13.6 million

How to Rob a Bank is a 2026 American action comedy heist film directed by David Leitch and written by Mark Bianculli. The film stars Nicholas Hoult, Zoë Kravitz, Anna Sawai, Rhenzy Feliz, Paul Sparks, Young Mazino, Tati Gabrielle, Christian Slater, Pete Davidson, and John C. Reilly. Its plot follows a crew of bank robbers who use social media to document their heists.

How to Rob a Bank was released in France on November 11, 2026, and in the United States by Amazon MGM Studios on November 13, 2026. The film received mixed reviews from critics.

== Plot ==
A team of bank robbers - led by Ryan, his wife Emi, Vince and Hugo, collectively known as "Who's Hungry?" - have been filming themselves robbing banks in an elaborate, organized manner and posting the videos online, often giving shares of the money to poor civilians and charities. Their video series, "How to Rob a Bank", exposes unjust societal systems and shares their tactics to encourage their viewers to carry out copycat robberies. They have gone viral and amassed a large following, irritating FBI agent John West, whose retirement plans are pushed aside after being assigned to the case. He recruits computer hacker Reagan Gardner, negotiating a deal with her to end her house arrest, to help him find them with her program FYPOS, which can use small details to track down the locations from their videos. The two quickly are at odds as Reagan is sympathetic to the crew's causes.

West and Reagan analyze the crew's pattern and observe that they have robbed smaller banks surrounding Vitality Trust. The two warn Vitality's CEO, David Walton, about the crew, but Reagan antagonizes Walton for Vitality's past controversies involving swindling pension funds. The two manage to intercept the crew during a failed attempt to steal an armored truck, but they are subdued instead by Ryan and Vince, who escape, and West becomes an internet meme ridiculed by the crew's followers.

With FYPOS, Reagan manages to lead the FBI to the train car where they find the crew's armory and identify them. The crew is apprehended, but they refuse to talk, letting influencer lawyer Marquis Collins represent them instead. West dissects the crew's motives: Ryan and Emi's son Ren died after their failure to afford lifesaving treatment due to insurance companies; Vince, an Afghanistan veteran, has terminal lung cancer due to burn pit exposure from his last tour, and wants to provide for his wife Skyler and daughter Michaela; and Hugo's family members have uncertain immigration status. Having discovered Vince's inhaler in the train car, West manages to blackmail Vince to work for them to reveal the crew's plans for their next heist. Vince instead discards his wire and warns the crew before escaping. Cornered by the police, he contacts his family one last time before committing suicide by cop.

Distraught over Vince's death, Ryan opts to continue with their planned last heist while Emi wants them to stop as she is pregnant. Ryan leaves while she is asleep and he and the remaining crew carry out their final heist at Vitality, which Reagan deduces was the bank that put them in debt. Despite West and the FBI surrounding the bank, the crew goads their followers to incite a riot around the city to cover their tracks. Streaming the heist, Ryan confronts Walton on camera and forces him at gunpoint to admit that they were providing services that hid unpayable debt. Ryan ends the stream to kill Walton, but he decides to spare him before escaping. West pursues Ryan through the riots, but Ryan is rescued by Emi. Ryan takes Emi's car and drives away alone before he is sideswiped and arrested, while Emi and the rest of the crew escape. Walton and Vitality are placed under investigation, while shares from the heist are given to Vince's family and local charities. Although West and Reagan celebrate their successful partnership, West ponders if he arrested the right people.

Two years later, Emi is raising her and Ryan's new child, but she gathers the crew again to bust Ryan out of prison. Reagan tells West that she has resigned from the FBI, but tips off West to a new Who's Hungry video, "How to Break Out of Prison."

== Cast ==
- Nicholas Hoult as Ryan Robinson / The Wolf, the leader of a Pittsburgh crew of bank robbers
- Zoë Kravitz as Reagan Gardner, a hacker and former associate professor at Carnegie Mellon
- Pete Davidson as Vince DeLuca, an Afghanistan veteran and member of the crew
- John C. Reilly as John West, an FBI agent tasked with tracking the crew down
- Anna Sawai as Emi Robinson, Ryan's partner and the crew's getaway driver
- Rhenzy Feliz as Hugo, the crew's tech guy and social media manager
- Christian Slater as David Walton, the CEO of Vitality Trust
- Tati Gabrielle as Skyler DeLuca, Vince's wife
- Paul Sparks as Agent Roberts, an FBI agent
- Young Mazino as Marquis Collins, a lawyer and TikTok content creator
- Andrew Schulz as himself
- Alessandra Frugoli as Michaela DeLuca, Vince and Skyler's daughter
- David Leitch voices Morpheus, Reagan's pet guinea pig.

== Production ==
=== Development ===
Mark Bianculli wrote the script for a heist film and began developing it for several years with Imagine Entertainment. David Leitch was eventually attached to direct and produce with his production company 87North Productions when Amazon MGM Studios also joined the project.

=== Casting ===
Nicholas Hoult was cast in the lead role in March 2025, with Anna Sawai added to the cast and Pete Davidson entering negotiations to join the following month. Davidson was confirmed to join in May, with Rhenzy Feliz and Zoë Kravitz joining the cast. John C. Reilly and Christian Slater joined the cast in June and July, respectively.

=== Filming ===
Principal photography began in Pittsburgh, Pennsylvania in June 2025.

=== Music ===
In addition to the film's 17-track original soundtrack, When the Party's Over is featured in the film.

== Release ==
How to Rob a Bank was first released in France on November 11, 2026, and in the United States on November 13, 2026. It was originally scheduled to release on September 4, 2026, but was pushed back to its current date. It was also slated for a release in Japan on the same day, but on June 17, Sony Pictures announced that it was canceled.

== Reception ==
=== Box office ===
The film made $2.2 million on its first day, including $900,000 from Thursday night previews.

=== Critical response ===
On the review aggregator website Rotten Tomatoes, 38% of 120 critics' reviews are positive, with an average rating of 5.1/10. The website's consensus reads: "Frenetic entertainment with a lot on its mind, How to Rob a Bank fights the law but ultimately gets busted less so for its provocative ideas and more for its inability to make them cohere into a satisfying message." Metacritic, which uses a weighted average, assigned the film a score of 49 out of 100, based on 31 critics, indicating "mixed or average" reviews. Audiences polled by CinemaScore gave the film an average grade of "B–" on an A+ to F scale.
