= I Was a Stranger =

- Theatrical release poster
- Directed by: Brandt Andersen
- Written by: Brandt Andersen
- Produced by: Brandt Andersen; Ossama Bawardi; Ryan Busse; Charlie Endean
- Starring: Yasmine Al Massri; Yahya Mahayni; Omar Sy; Ziad Bakri; Constantine Markoulakis; Jason Beghe; Ayman Samman; Massa Daoud
- Cinematography: Jonathan Sela
- Edited by: Jeff Seibeneck
- Music by: Nick Chuba
- Production company: Philistine Films
- Distributed by: Angel
- Release dates: February 23, 2024 (Berlin); December 31, 2025 (United States)
- Running time: 103 minutes
- Countries: Jordan; United States; Palestine; Israel; Turkey
- Languages: Arabic; English; Greek
- Box office: $3 million

I Was a Stranger (formerly known as The Stranger's Case) is a 2024 drama film directed, written, and produced by Brandt Andersen, in his feature directorial debut.

The film premiered at the 74th Berlin International Film Festival on February 23, 2024, and was released in the United States in limited release on December 31, 2025, before expanding wide on January 9, 2026.

== Plot ==
The film follows five people who are pulled together, coming together on a single night where survival is uncertain.

The story is told in five chapters, one chapter for each character: "The doctor", "The soldier", "The smuggler", "The poet" and "The captain". The stories partially overlap.

== Cast ==
- Yasmine Al Massri as Amira
- Yahya Mahayni as Mustafa
- Omar Sy as Marwan
- Ziad Bakri as Fathi
- Constantine Markoulakis as Stavros
- Jason Beghe as Dr. Kroft
- Ayman Samman as Shaheen
- Massa Daoud as Rasha

== Production ==
The film was the feature directorial debut of Brandt Andersen. Andersen wrote the script of the film in 2017 following Donald Trump putting a controversial laptop ban on U.S.-bound flights from certain airports in the Middle East. Andersen finished writing the script in a month as he returned to the United States, under the title The Stranger's Case. The script was written as a feature film at first, but Andersen was unable to get the project off the ground despite Omar Sy's involvement in the project, and after a suggestion from a friend, Andersen made a short version of the film, called Refugee. Filming took place in Jordan, Turkey, and Chicago. On every single day of shooting, the film had daily devotionals. The film was produced by Andersen, Ossama Bawardi, Ryan Busse, and Charlie Endean.

== Release ==
The film had its world premiere at the 74th Berlin International Film Festival as part of the Special Gala section on February 23, 2024. In September 2025, the film was re-titled as I Was a Stranger. Angel Studios released the film in the United States in limited release on December 31, 2025, followed by a wide expansion on January 9, 2026. The film was originally set for a limited release on December 25.

== Reception ==
The film holds a 76% approval rating on review aggregator Rotten Tomatoes, based on 21 critic reviews with an average rating of 7/10. The website's critics consensus reads, "Pairing sharp storytelling and daring direction from Brandt Andersen, I Was a Stranger overcomes an occasionally heavy-handed script with gripping set pieces and nerve-jangling tension." Audiences polled by CinemaScore gave the film an average grade of "A-" on an A+ to F scale.

Wendy Ide of Screen Daily called the film "An ambitious and confident first feature". Robert Daniels of RogerEbert.com finds the film exciting, though manipulative in places.
