= Jason Statham Stole My Bike =

- Directed by: David Leitch
- Screenplay by: David Leitch
- Story by: David Leitch; Jason Statham
- Produced by: Jason Statham; Kelly McCormick; David Leitch; Lorenzo Di Bonaventura; Dan Cohen; Basil Iwanyk
- Starring: Jason Statham; Hannah Waddingham; Eddie Peng; Daniel Ings
- Cinematography: Jonathan Sela
- Music by: Dominic Lewis
- Production companies: Black Bear Pictures; 87North Productions; Di Bonaventura Pictures; Barnstorm Entertainment
- Distributed by: Black Bear Pictures (United States); Amazon MGM Studios (International)
- Release date: August 6, 2027
- Country: United States
- Language: English

Jason Statham Stole My Bike is an upcoming American action comedy film written and directed by David Leitch, based on a story by Leitch and Jason Statham, who will star as a fictionalized version of himself, alongside Anne Hathaway, John Cena, and Daniel Ings.

Jason Statham Stole My Bike is scheduled to be released in the United States by Black Bear Pictures on August 6, 2027.

== Cast ==
- Jason Statham as a fictionalized version of himself
- Hannah Waddingham
- Eddie Peng
- Daniel Ings
- Artie Wilkison-Hunt

== Production ==
=== Development and casting ===
In February 2026, it was announced that David Leitch would direct the film, with Jason Statham starring. Black Bear Pictures would handle domestic distribution rights and would handle international sales. In April, Leitch revealed that the film would serve as a meta commentary on Statham. The script was completed in 2024, and it was Statham who approached Leitch about the film, since his scheduling was available.

In July 2026, it was revealed that Hannah Waddingham, Eddie Peng, Daniel Ings, and Artie Wilkison-Hunt joined the cast.

=== Filming ===
The film was scheduled to shoot in London and Malta, and principal photography began on June 1, 2026, with Jonathan Sela serving as the cinematographer. The entire shoot was set to wrap within a week.

== Release ==
Jason Statham Stole My Bike is scheduled to be released in the United States by Black Bear Pictures on August 6, 2027. In June 2026, it was announced that Amazon MGM Studios had acquired distribution rights to the film for the world excluding the United States, the Caribbean, the CIS, the Middle East, Israel, and Asia excluding India.
