= Bulletproof (Hacks) =

- Hacks episode
- Episode no.: Season 3 Episode 9
- Directed by: Lucia Aniello
- Written by: Lucia Aniello; Jen Statsky; Paul W. Downs
- Original air date: May 30, 2024

Guest appearances
- J. Smith-Cameron as Kathy Vance; Kathryn Newton as Bella Donaldson

Episode chronology
← Previous "Yes, And"	Next → "Big, Brave Girl"
- Hacks season 3

"Bulletproof" is the ninth and final episode for its third season of the American comedy-drama series Hacks, and the twenty-seventh episode overall. The episode first released for the streaming service Max on May 30, 2024. It depicts comedian Deborah Vance (Jean Smart) rescinding the role of head writer to Ava Daniels (Hannah Einbinder) for her upcoming late-night talk show.

The episode received positive reviews from critics and soon earned nominations for Outstanding Supporting Actor, Actress, and Directing for a Comedy Series categories. The series co-creators Lucia Aniello, Jen Statsky, and Paul W. Downs later won their Outstanding Writing for a Comedy Series at the 76th Primetime Emmy Awards.

== Synopsis ==
Deborah spends quality time with her sister Kathy for the first time in years. However, she is distracted by work and cuts their time short, prompting Kathy to tell her that she does not wish to rekindle their relationship after all. Deborah gives Ava the head writer job for her upcoming Late Night show, for which Ava quits her job and forgoes a promotion. However, Deborah later rescinds the offer and tells Ava that the network demanded someone else. She invites Ava to be a staff writer instead. Ava later finds out that Deborah had her choice of who to hire. When Ava confronts Deborah, Deborah defends the lie and says she needs to make every choice to support the success of the show. Ava tearfully demands Deborah give her the job but Deborah refuses. Later, Ava meets Deborah at the studio and tells her that unless Deborah gives her the writing job, she will tell the network that Deborah slept with the company chairman.

== Reception ==
The episode received critical acclaim. Brian Lowry of CNN praised the finale's plot as an accurate portrayal of the "mix of narcissism and self-absorption" that can seem necessary for success in Hollywood. Sadie Bell wrote for Marie Claire that the episode illustrates how Ava has successfully learned from Deborah over the years.

== Awards and nominations ==
The episode received several accolades including a Directors Guild of America Award for Lucia Aniello, and a Primetime Emmy Award to Aniello, Jen Statsky, and Paul W. Downs for Outstanding Writing for a Comedy Series.
