= Leo Chaloukian =

American sound engineer (1927–2024)

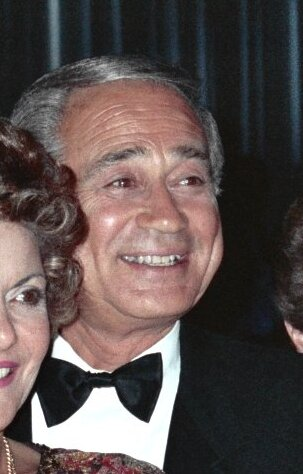
- Chaloukian in 1990
- Born: June 19, 1927; Chicago, Illinois, U.S.
- Died: July 18, 2024 (aged 97)
- Occupation: Sound engineer

Leo Chaloukian (June 18, 1927 – July 18, 2024) was an American sound engineer, business owner, and president of the Academy of Television Arts & Sciences from 1989 to 1993.

Chaloukian began his career in sound engineering at Ryder Sound Service in 1954. He became the owner of the company in 1976. After serving on the board of governors for the Academy of Television Arts & Sciences, including two terms as a vice-president, he was elected president of the academy in December 1989. He sold Ryder to Soundelux in 1997, but continued with the company as a senior vice-president. He retired in 2014.

At the 97th Academy Awards, his name was mentioned in the In Memoriam section.
