= Brandt Andersen =

American film producer

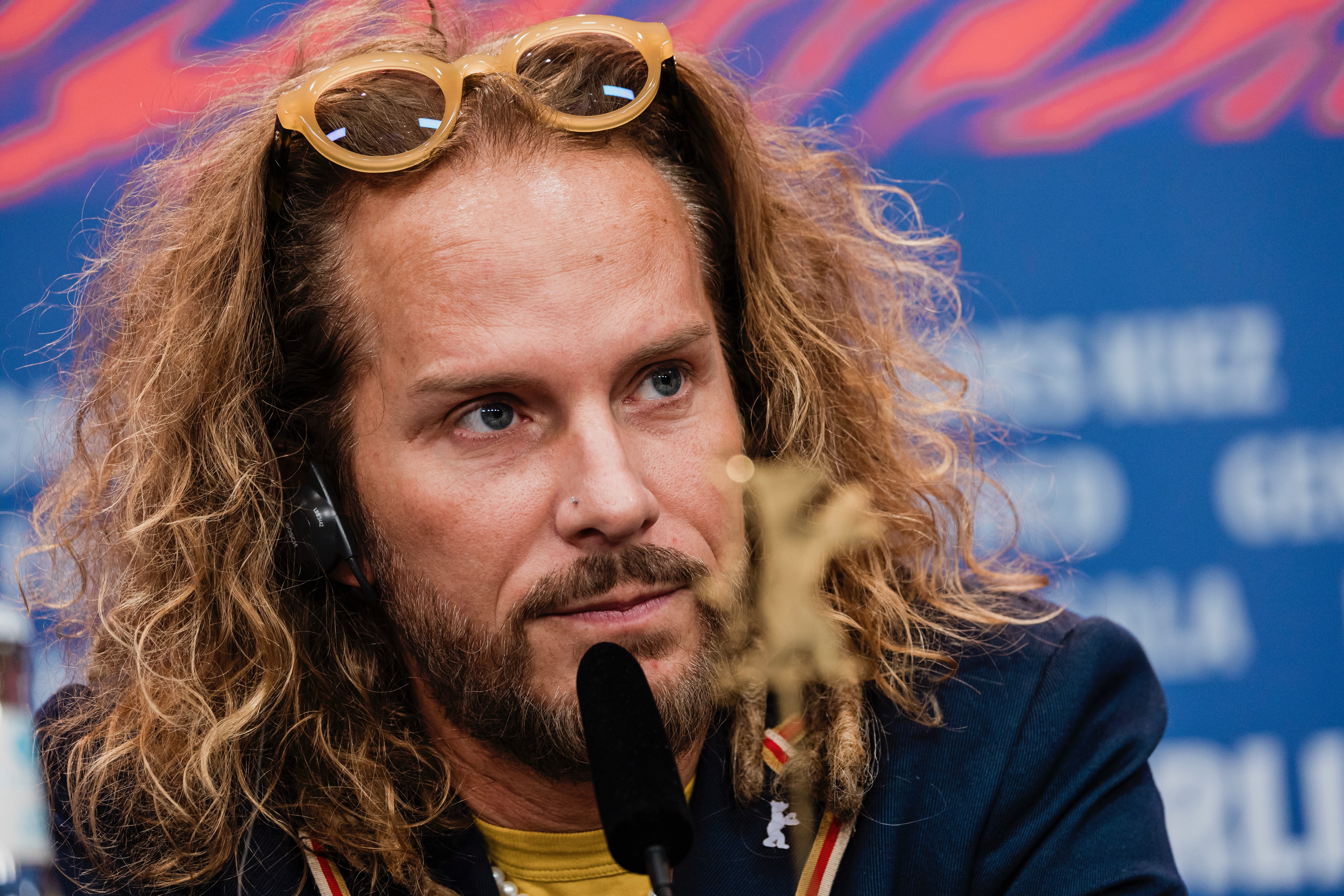
- Born: September 13, 1977 (age 49); Tampa, Florida, U.S.
- Occupations: Writer, Director, Producer
- Known for: I Was a Stranger, Refugee, Everest, Lone Survivor, Silence, American Made

Brandt Andersen (born September 13, 1977) is an American activist, writer, director, and producer. Andersen wrote and directed I Was a Stranger (formerly known as The Strangers' Case). A feature film based on Andersen's short film titled Refugee. I Was a Stranger stars Yasmine Al Massri, Omar Sy, and Jason Beghe. The film was Andersen's feature directorial debut and opened at the Berlin International Film Festival winning the Amnesty International Prize. Andersen's short film Refugee opened at the Cairo International Film Festival and has been screened at film festivals across the globe, by the UNHCR for World Refugee Day, and at Banksy's Walled Off Hotel. The film earned Andersen the award for Best Director and Best Dramatic Short Film at the 2020 French Riviera Film Festival and was short-listed for an Academy Award for Best Live Action Short in 2020. As a producer Andersen is known for such films as Everest, Lone Survivor, 2 Guns, Escape Plan, and Broken City. His film The Flowers of War was nominated for a Golden Globe Award in 2011. Two of Andersen's films have premiered at the Sundance Film Festival. First in 2012 with the Stephen Frears film Lay The Favorite, and then in 2015 with the Jared Hess-directed Don Verdean.

Other projects include the Doug Liman film American Made starring Tom Cruise, the Martin Scorsese film Silence, starring Andrew Garfield and Liam Neeson, the Garry Marshall film Mother's Day, starring Jennifer Aniston, Julia Roberts, and Kate Hudson.

== Early career ==
From 2005 to 2012 Andersen owned and operated The Utah Flash, an NBA G League franchise. Andersen sold the team to the Philadelphia 76ers in 2013.

During his ownership tenure, the team had the highest attendance and sponsorship revenue in the NBA G League.

=== Michael Jordan promotional hoax ===
In December 2009, Andersen orchestrated a promotional event for the Flash’s home opener that generated significant controversy. Beginning in September 2009, Andersen had publicly challenged Michael Jordan and former Utah Jazz guard Bryon Russell to a one-on-one rematch, referencing Jordan’s famous game-winning shot over Russell in Game 6 of the 1998 NBA Finals. Andersen offered $100,000 to the winner’s charity of choice.

On game day, December 7, 2009, Andersen sent a Jordan lookalike around Orem, Utah with bodyguards and created an internet video showing the imposter eating at a local restaurant. The video was distributed through social media and created buzz that Jordan had actually arrived in Utah. More than 7,500 fans attended the game. When the imposter appeared on court at halftime, fans immediately recognized the deception—the lookalike was noticeably shorter than Jordan. The crowd began booing, many fans left the arena, and some threw their free Flash T-shirts back onto the floor.

Andersen subsequently apologized and offered refunds to ticketholders. He explained that he wanted to test the effectiveness of viral media and had assumed the hoax would be discovered quickly. NBA Development League President Dan Reed also issued an apology, stating it was a promotion “that never should have happened.”

In 2008 Andersen hosted the Iranian National Basketball team as they trained for the 2008 Summer Olympics. For his assistance in helping the Iranian Olympic Team, Andersen, along with then Deputy Commissioner of the NBA Adam Silver, received a medal of peace from the Iranian Basketball Association.

In 2009 the Chinese National Basketball Team awarded Andersen an award for the cooperation shown in allowing their National team access to train with the Utah Flash.

Andersen was one of the first sports owners to put a strong emphasis on recycling in-arena waste. For instituting the Flash Recycling Initiative, Andersen was awarded the Environmental Quality Award in Utah.

In 2007 Andersen and famed architect Frank Gehry collaborated to design a community outside of Salt Lake City, Utah. Andersen has publicly stated that his friendship with Mr. Gehry has had a huge impact on how he works and views creativity.

In 1998, Andersen attended Brigham Young University. During his sophomore year at BYU, while working at a small film studio to pay for his education, he founded uSight, a technology company that created banking and transactional software for small businesses. In 2004, Inc. reported that the company was the second fastest growing company on its annual Inc. 500 list. Shortly after Andersen sold and exited the company. Andersen was the sole shareholder and the sale was reported above $50M. Following the sale he returned to school and graduated with a BA in Fine Arts from Brigham Young University.

== Activist ==
Andersen is the founder of the REEL Foundation, which he founded in 2021. The foundation uses art and storytelling to empower refugees and individuals from marginalized communities to share their stories through art.

In November 2023, Andersen flew humanitarian aid drops over Gaza with the Jordanian military.

From 2009 to 2019, Andersen visited refugees and internally displaced people in Syria, Turkey, Greece, Jordan, Italy, Germany, France, and Mexico. In July 2017, in association with CARE, Andersen led a group of filmmakers including Shay Mitchell, Jason Beghe, and Tobias Schliessler to the Azraq refugee camp in Jordan to run a filmmaking bootcamp for Syrian teenagers. Their film Peace Please has been shown at Human Rights conferences around the world.

In 2010, three days after the earthquake that devastated the country of Haiti, Andersen traveled with a team of Doctors to Port-au-Prince, Haiti. He spent 10 days working with doctors and aid workers and assisted in importing and disseminating millions in aid. Upon his return, Andersen raised money to help rebuild an orphanage on the outskirts of Port-au-Prince. While in Haiti, USA Today listed Andersen's Twitter account as one of the top ten accounts to follow for updates from the country.

In 2006, Andersen started the Flash Family Foundation to help children living below the poverty line with food, clothing, and education. The foundation was run by Andersen with the help of volunteers including basketball players from the Utah Flash and Utah Jazz.

While attending university, Andersen spent five years as an on-call volunteer for the Utah County Search and Rescue Team, part of the Utah County Sheriff's Department. His work included rescue and recovery in avalanche, water, ice, and mountain conditions.

== Filmography ==
- The Flowers of War (2011, China)
- Lone Survivor (2013)
- 2 Guns (2013)
- Broken City (2013)
- Escape Plan (2014)
- Lone Survivor (2014)
- Everest (2015)
- Don Verdean (2015)
- Mother's Day (2016)
- Silence (2016)
- American Made (2017)
- I Was a Stranger (2025)
