= David Leitch =

American filmmaker (born 1975)

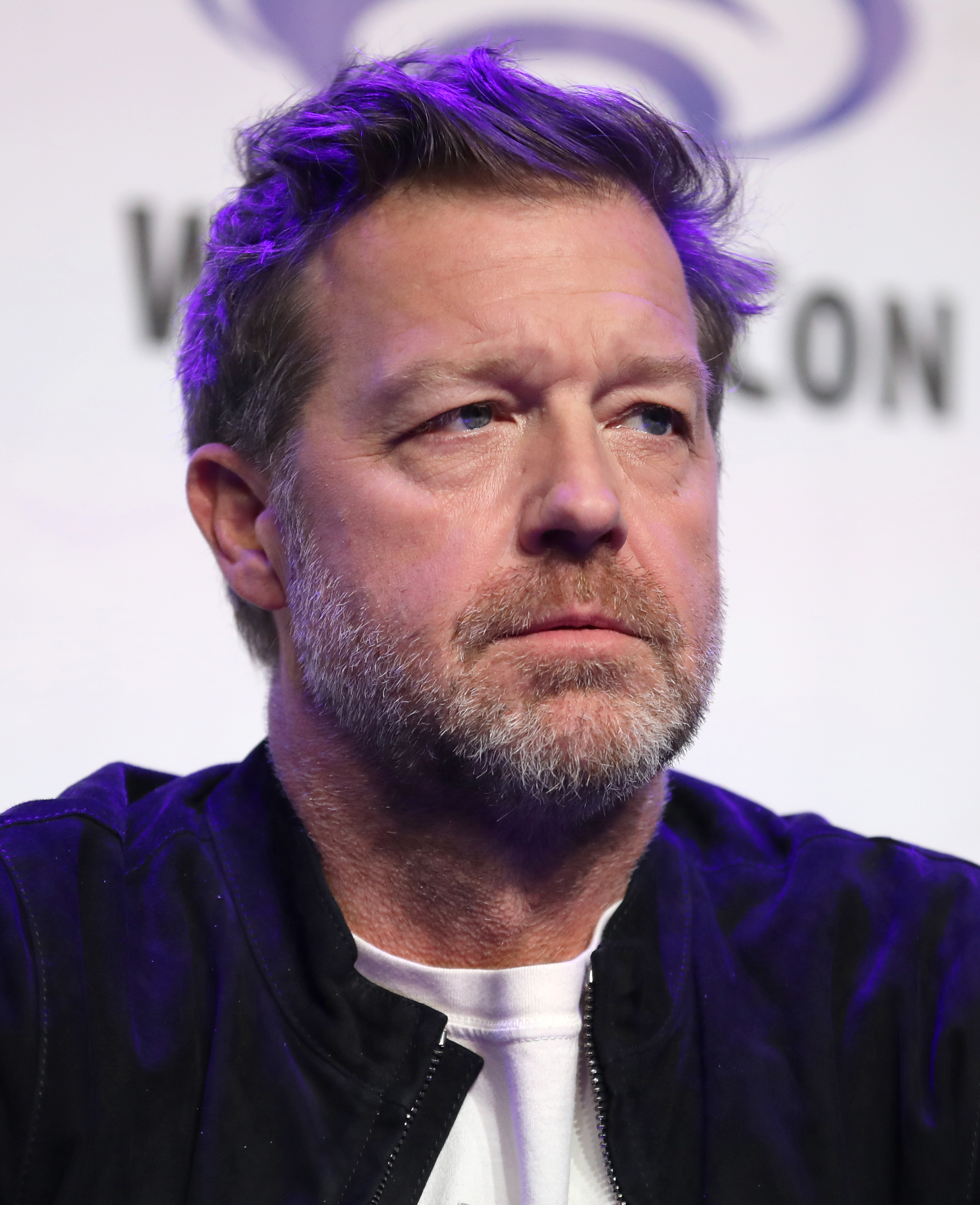
- Leitch at the 2024 WonderCon
- Born: November 16, 1975 (age 51); Kohler, Wisconsin, U.S.
- Education: University of Minnesota (BA)
- Occupations: Filmmaker; actor; stunt performer; stunt coordinator
- Years active: 1995–present
- Spouse: Kelly McCormick (m. 2014)

David Leitch (/liːtʃ/; born November 16, 1975) is an American filmmaker, stunt performer, stunt coordinator, and actor. He made his directorial debut on the action film John Wick (2014) with Chad Stahelski, though only Stahelski was credited. He later also directed the films Atomic Blonde (2017), Deadpool 2 (2018), Hobbs & Shaw (2019), Bullet Train (2022), The Fall Guy (2024) and How to Rob a Bank (2026).

== Education ==
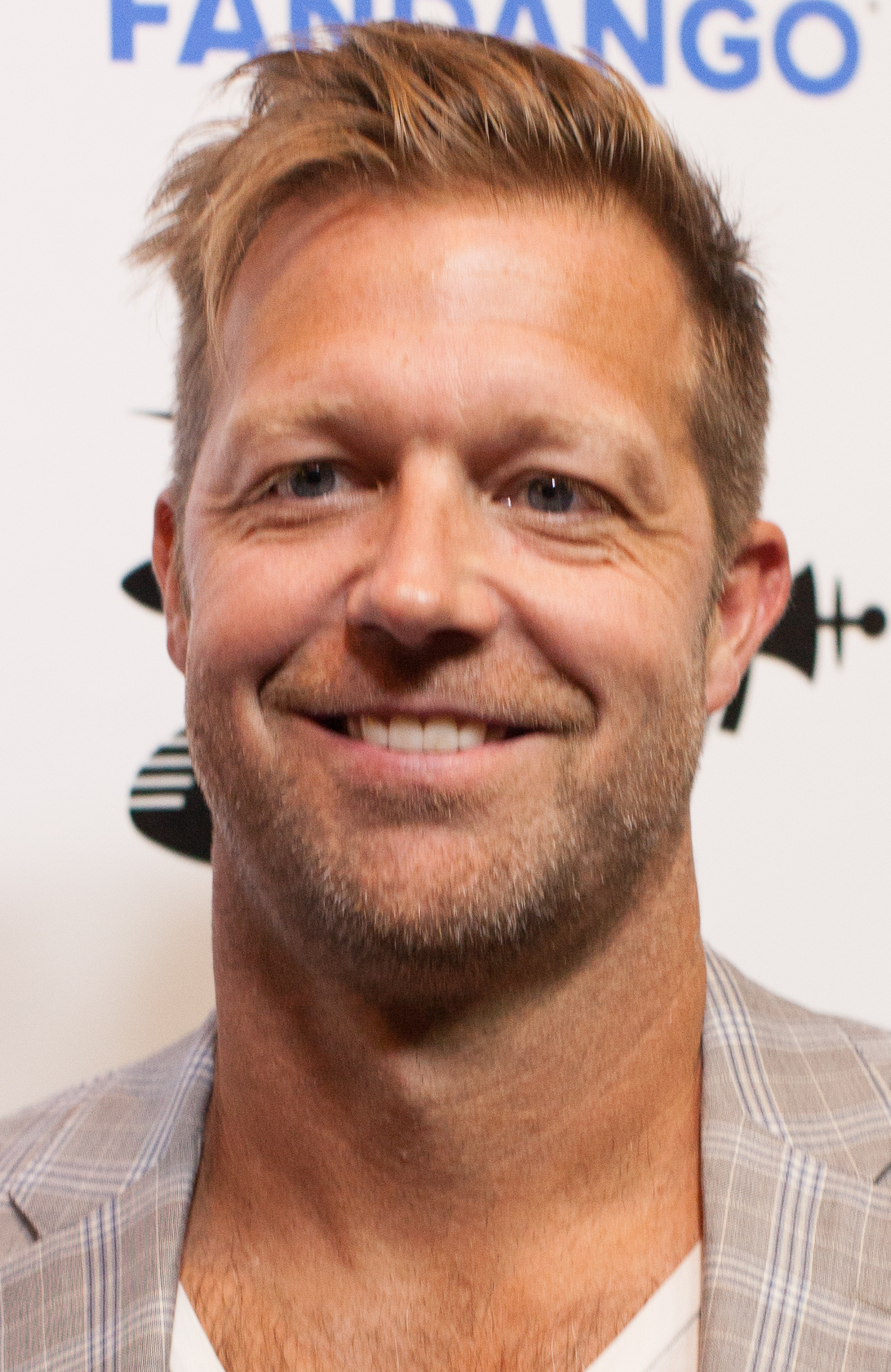
Leitch in 2014

Leitch graduated from the University of Minnesota with a Bachelor of Arts degree in International Relations in 1993.

== Career ==
Leitch was a stunt double for Brad Pitt five times and twice for Jean-Claude Van Damme. Leitch and his crew won two awards for The Bourne Ultimatum at the Screen Actors Guild Awards. He also shared a 2008 Taurus World Stunt Award with fellow stunt-person Kai Martin for high work.

He wrote and starred in Confessions of an Action Star, a parody of action films and the action film industry released in 2009.

Leitch and Chad Stahelski opened an action design production company called 87Eleven in 1997. In 2009, Stahelski and Leitch were second-unit directors and stunt co-ordinators on Ninja Assassin. The two co-directed the 2014 film John Wick, although Leitch himself was not credited as co-director. Leitch executive produced the three John Wick sequels, which Stahelski solo directed.

He moved on to direct films such as Atomic Blonde, Deadpool 2 and Fast & Furious Presents: Hobbs & Shaw with his wife and creative partner Kelly McCormick serving as a producer. In 2022, he also directed Brad Pitt in the action-thriller Bullet Train.

In September 2020, Leitch signed on to direct and produce stuntman drama The Fall Guy for Universal Pictures, with Drew Pearce writing the screenplay and Ryan Gosling and Emily Blunt starring. The film, based on the 1980s television series of the same name, was released in the United States on May 3, 2024.

=== Upcoming/unrealized projects ===
In July 2018, Leitch was in early talks to direct a remake of Enter the Dragon, but on April 22, 2019, it was reported to be a sequel, rather than a remake. In January 2019, Leitch signed on to direct Undying Love, based on the limited comic book series by Tomm Coker and Daniel Freedman, for Studio 8. In July 2022, it was announced Leitch would direct the television miniseries Hot Air, starring Andrew Garfield as Richard Branson, based on the book Dirty Secrets by Martyn Gregory. In August 2022, Leitch was attached to direct a Netflix adaptation of the Dark Horse comic series Bang!, with Idris Elba set to star. In November 2022, Leitch became attached to direct spy thriller Red Shirt, based on a pitch by Simon Kinberg and with Channing Tatum set to star; by the end of the month, the project was picked up by Amazon Studios. In January 2024, Leitch was onboard to direct a feature-length adaptation of Kung Fu for Universal Pictures, with Donnie Yen set to star. In May 2024, Leitch was attached to produce and possibly direct a television series adaptation of Button Man for Fifth Season. In January 2025, he entered early talks to direct Ocean's 14, a sequel to the Ocean's franchise.

Leitch was once attached to direct The Division, based on the video game of the same name, but he stepped down due to scheduling conflicts with Bullet Train. He was also set to direct the action thriller Fast & Loose for Netflix and STXfilms, with Will Smith set to star, but by March 2022, he left the project to focus instead on The Fall Guy. He would continue to be involved as producer with Michael Bay in talks to replace him as director. Leitch was in discussions to direct a new Jurassic Park film scheduled for July 2, 2025, but left the project over creative differences; the film was ultimately directed by Gareth Edwards.

In May 2025, it was announced Leitch would direct the crime action thriller How to Rob a Bank, starring Nicolas Hoult, Pete Davidson, and Anna Sawai. The film will be distributed by Amazon MGM Studios and is scheduled for November 13, 2026.

== Personal life ==
Leitch dated actress Maggie Q from 2009 to 2011.

He has been married to executive producer Kelly McCormick since 2014.

== Filmography ==
=== Film ===
Year	Title	Director	Producer	Notes
2014	John Wick	Uncredited	Yes	Co-directed with Chad Stahelski
2017	Atomic Blonde	Yes	No	
2018	Deadpool 2	Yes	No	
2019	Hobbs & Shaw	Yes	No	
2022	Bullet Train	Yes	Yes	
2024	The Fall Guy	Yes	Yes	
2026	How to Rob a Bank	Yes	Yes	
2027	Jason Statham Stole My Bike †	Yes	Yes	Filming

Producer only

- Nobody (2021)
- Violent Night (2022)
- Love Hurts (2025)
- Nobody 2 (2025)
- Over Your Dead Body (2026)
- Violent Night 2 (2026)

Writer

- Confessions of an Action Star (2005)
- Jason Statham Stole My Bike (2027)

Executive producer

- John Wick: Chapter 2 (2017)
- John Wick: Chapter 3 – Parabellum (2019)
- Kate (2021)
- John Wick: Chapter 4 (2023)
- Pretty Lethal (2026)

Short film

Year	Title	Notes
2017	No Good Deed	
2019	Snowbrawl	Shot on iPhone 11, sponsored by Apple Inc.

2nd unit director

Year	Title	Director
2003	In Hell	Ringo Lam
2008	The Midnight Meat Train	Ryuhei Kitamura
2009	Ninja Assassin	James McTeigue
2010	The King of Fighters	Gordon Chan
2011	The Mechanic	Simon West
2011	Conan the Barbarian	Marcus Nispel
2011	In Time	Andrew Niccol
2013	Hansel & Gretel: Witch Hunters	Tommy Wirkola
2013	Parker	Taylor Hackford
2013	Anchorman 2: The Legend Continues	Adam McKay
2013	The Wolverine	James Mangold
2013	Escape Plan	Mikael Håfström
2014	Teenage Mutant Ninja Turtles	Jonathan Liebesman
2015	Hitman: Agent 47	Aleksander Bach
2015	Jurassic World	Colin Trevorrow
2016	Captain America: Civil War	Russo brothers
2016	Teenage Mutant Ninja Turtles: Out of the Shadows	Dave Green

Stuntwork

- Perfect Target (1997)
- Orgazmo (1997)
- Almost Heroes (1998)
- BASEketball (1998)
- Blade (1998)
- Out in Fifty (1999)
- Fight Club (1999)
- The Right Hook (2000)
- Big Momma's House (2000)
- Yup Yup Man (2000)
- Bad Seed (2000)
- Men of Honor (2000)
- The Substitute: Failure Is Not an Option (2001)
- The Score (2001)
- The Mexican (2001)
- Replicant (2001)
- Ocean's Eleven (2001)
- Spy Game (2001)
- One Night at McCool's (2001)
- Ghost of Mars (2001)
- Corky Romano (2001)
- The Order (2001)
- Serving Sara (2002)
- Daredevil (2003)
- In Hell (2003)
- Seabiscuit (2003)
- S.W.A.T. (2003)
- The Matrix Reloaded (2003)
- The Matrix Revolutions (2003)
- Stuck on You (2003)
- Troy (2004)
- In Enemy Hands (2004)
- Van Helsing (2004)
- Constantine (2005)
- XXX: State of the Union (2005)
- Mr. and Mrs. Smith (2005)
- The Dukes of Hazzard (2005)
- Serenity (2005)
- V for Vendetta (2005)
- Underworld: Evolution (2006)
- When a Stranger Calls (2006)
- Beerfest (2006)
- 300 (2006)
- Next (2007)
- The Bourne Ultimatum (2007)
- The Invasion (2007)
- I Am Legend (2007)
- The Gene Generation (2007)
- Mama's Boy (2007)
- Jumper (2008)
- Speed Racer (2008)
- The Midnight Meat Train (2008)
- Bangkok Dangerous (2008)
- Angels & Demons (2009)
- X-Men Origins: Wolverine (2009)
- The Hangover (2009)
- Tron: Legacy (2010)
- The Mechanic (2011)
- Conan the Barbarian (2011)
- In Time (2011)
- Movie 43: "Happy Birthday" segment (2013)
- Jupiter Ascending (2015)

=== Acting credits ===
Year	Title	Role	Notes
2001	The Order	Det. Mike Moran	
2002	Nine Lives	Paul	
2003	In Hell	Paul	
2005	V for Vendetta	Convenience Store V	
2005	Confessions of an Action Star	Frank Sledge	
2005	The Dukes of Hazzard	Puncher	
2007	Fetch	John "Fetch" Fetcher	Short film
2008	Speed Racer	Gus Gustaferson	Uncredited
2009	Ninja Assassin	Europol Door Guard	
2010	The King of Fighters	Terry Bogard	
2011	The Mechanic	Sebastian	
2012	The Bourne Legacy	The Driver	
2013	Escape Plan	Ship Captain	
2018	Deadpool 2	Cain Marko / Juggernaut Ground Church Mutant	Leitch provided motion-capture performance on-set, while Ryan Reynolds provided facial motion-capture and voice performances
2019	Hobbs & Shaw	Helicopter Pilot	
2022	Bullet Train	Jeff Zufelt	

=== Stunts ===
Year	Title	Notes
1995	Sherman Oaks	Season 1
1996	7th Heaven	
1997-2001	Buffy the Vampire Slayer	18 episodes
1998	CHiPs '99	TV movie
1999	The Practice	Episode: "Day in Court"
1999	The Strip	
2000	The President's Man	TV movie
2001	The Pretender 2001	TV movie
2001	Scrubs	
2006	2006 MTV Movie Awards	TV special, Stunt double
2006	General Hospital	Episode 10967

=== Acting credits ===
Year	Title	Role	Notes
1998	Martial Law	David Hasbro	Episodes "Diamond Fever", "Dead Ringers", "Funny Money" and "Trackdown"
2000	Power Rangers Lightspeed Rescue	Brian	Episode "Up to the Challenge"
2001	Walker Texas Ranger	Floyd Jessop	Episode "Medieval Crimes"
2003	L.A. County 187	Earnest Cop	TV movie
2004	Charmed	Innocent	Episode "There's Something About Leo"
2019	Songland	Himself	Episode "Aloe Blacc"

== Awards and nominations ==
Year	Association	Nominated work	Category	Result	Ref.
2007	Screen Actors Guild Awards	300	Outstanding Performance by a Stunt Ensemble in a Motion Picture	Nominated	
2007	Screen Actors Guild Awards	The Bourne Ultimatum	Outstanding Performance by a Stunt Ensemble in a Motion Picture	Won	
2019	Grammy Awards	Deadpool 2	Best Compilation Soundtrack for Visual Media	Nominated	
