= Don Buchwald =

American talent agent (1936–2024)

Don Buchwald (May 13, 1936 – July 22, 2024) was an American talent agent. He was the founder of the talent agency Buchwald and the longtime agent to Howard Stern. Buchwald died on July 22, 2024, at the age of 88.
