= Spermageddon =

2024 Norwegian animated film

- Theatrical release poster
- Directed by: Tommy Wirkola; Rasmus A. Sivertsen
- Written by: Tommy Wirkola; Jesper Sundnes; Vegar Hoel
- Produced by: Jørgen Storm Rosenberg; Kjetil Omberg
- Starring: Aksel Hennie; Mathilde Storm; Nasrin Khusrawi; Christian Mikkelsen; Bjørn Sundquist; Christian Rubeck
- Edited by: Martin Stoltz
- Music by: Christian Wibe
- Production companies: Qvisten Animation; 74 Entertainment
- Distributed by: SF Studios
- Release dates: 10 June 2024 (Annecy); 28 February 2025 (Norway)
- Running time: 80 minutes
- Country: Norway
- Language: Norwegian
- Budget: €3 million
- Box office: $1.4 million

Spermageddon is a 2024 Norwegian adult animated musical sex comedy film directed by Tommy Wirkola and Rasmus A. Sivertsen. The film consists of two plot lines, one focusing on a teenage couple having sex for the first time, and the other on Simen the Semen and his friends in quest for the Egg.

The film has been reported to be "in the vein of Sausage Party" and described by Wirkola as "both a road movie and an epic adventure ... much like Lord of the Rings". Producer Kjetil Omberg likened it to South Park and Checkered Ninja, saying it targets "elder kids and adults".

== Plot ==
Jens, a 18-year-old boy, goes on a camping trip with his friends to a cabin. One of the girls is Lisa, Jens’ crush from the previous summer who moved after her father got a job in Oslo. During a game of Truth or Dare, Jens is dared to kiss Lisa and afterwards the two have sex for the first time. Inside Jens’ testicles lives a society of sperm cells. A young sperm cell named Simen Sprut is ostracised due to not having any interest in taking part in the race to the egg. His only friend, Cumilla, tries to get him to take an interest. Meanwhile, Jizzmo, an entrepreneur sperm cell, creates an armoured suit called the Ejaculator 9000 which allows him to fight through anything that will prevent him from getting to the egg, including killing other sperm, which he demonstrates by brutally killing a worker.

During Jens’ first ejaculation, Jizzmo cuts open the condom, which allows him and other sperm cells to enter Lisa’s vagina. Simen upsets Cumilla when he holds her back from entering Jens’ urethra. Meanwhile, Jens and Lisa have sex again. However, Jens, due to being tired from the previous intercourse and also having bruised both his eyes, ends up penetrating Lisa’s anus. This time, Simen and Cumilla, along with their teacher Professor Saltsmak and classmate Etterskvett (Aftersquirt) enter the urethra but unfortunately end up in Lisa’s rectum. There, they meet an e-coli who guides them to Lisa’s system where they travel through her bladder and manage to swing on her pubic hairs into her vagina while she is urinating and defecating. However, Etterskvett ends up falling to his death.

Lisa applies spermicide which kills many of the sperm inside her uterus, including Saltsmak. Meanwhile, a trio of gangster sperms led by Egon Olsæd who are on a mission to enter the egg and become triplets try to get the spermicide to kill Jizzmo but he escapes and instead kills Egon’s friends Benner’n and Bjell. Jizzmo then tries to kill the other sperm cells but is stopped by Egon who causes Jizzmo’s suit to self-destruct, sacrificing himself, killing the spermicide and allowing the other sperm cells, including Simen and Cumilla to swim to the egg.

Jens and Lisa go on a walk and Lisa expresses her frustration to Jens for not being able to have an orgasm from when they’ve had sex. The two have sex against a tree and as soon as Lisa orgasms, a beehive falls on Jens’ pelvis who ejaculates in it. The bees chase Jens along with Lisa and the two end up falling down a hill. In Lisa’s uterus, the turbulence causes the egg to bounce around, killing the other sperm cells and leaving only Simen and Cumilla. However, a still-living Jizzmo attacks them and is finally killed when he bites off Cumilla’s tail and is crushed by the egg. Simen and Cumilla enter the egg together.

Six weeks later, Jens and Lisa go to a clinic to get an abortion pill where the gynaecologist explains through song that they should take time to plan for a family if that’s what they want. The film ends with Jens suggesting a movie marathon with Lisa as the abortion pill will take two days to work.

== Cast ==
- Aksel Hennie as Simen, a male sperm with a pair of glasses who lives inside of Jens
- Mathilde Storm as Cumilla, a female sperm who lives inside of Jens
- Nasrin Khusrawi as Lisa, an African-Norwegian teenager and Jens's girlfriend
- Christian Mikkelsen as Jens, an awkward ginger-haired teenager who is a Star Wars fan and Lisa's boyfriend
- Bjørn Sundquist as Professor Saltsmak, an elder sperm who lives inside of Jens
- Christian Rubeck as Jizzmo, the captain of the Sperms with an Iron Man-inspired suit
- John Rungot as Egon Olsæd a sperm who lives inside of Jens
- Gustav Nilsen as Benner'n & Bjell, two sperms who lives inside of Jens
- Stig Frode Henriksen as E-Coli Troll, an e-coli who lives inside of Lisa's colon
- Silya as Gynekologen
- Jakob Schøyen Andersen as Hjernekjell, Jens's brain
- Ingrid Bolsø Berdal as Hjerniffer, a part of Lisa's brain
- Charlotte Frogner as Hjernia, a part of Lisa's brain

== Production ==
In June 2021, the production was reported to begin "in the fall". It was in production as of May 2022. In March 2024, Wirkola said the film was in post-production.

== Music ==
Spermageddon

Soundtrack album by Christian Wibe
- Released: February 28, 2025

Christian Wibe chronology
Gold Run (2022)	Spermageddon (2025)

The soundtrack contains several musical numbers composed by screenwriter Jesper Sundnes and score composer Christian Wibe. Wibe has previously worked with Wirkola on Dead Snow (2009), Dead Snow 2: Red vs. Dead (2014), What Happened to Monday (2017), The Trip (2021) and Violent Night (2022).

=== Track listing ===
No.	Title	Length
1.	"Her i Pungen" (performed by Aksel Hennie and Mathilde Storm)	3:50
2.	"Spermageddon" (Christian Rubeck)	3:15
3.	"Abortsangen" (Silya)	4:32
4.	"E. colisangen" (Stig Frode Henriksen)	1:23

== Release ==
Spermageddon was being sold for local distributors at the Marché du Film of the 2022 Cannes Film Festival by the international sales agent Charades. It screened for prospective buyers at the 2024 edition.

The film premiered at the Annecy International Animation Film Festival on 10 June 2024, under its Midnight Specials section. It screened at the Bucheon International Fantastic Film Festival in July 2024, at the Fantastic Fest in September 2024, at the Sitges Film Festival in October 2024, and in the Limelight section of the 54th International Film Festival Rotterdam in February 2025.

The film was set for release in the Nordics on 10 January 2025 by SF Studios, but the release was later pushed back to 28 February 2025. The film has been sold for distribution in the Adriatics, Austria, the Baltics, Bulgaria, the CIS, the Czech Republic, France, Germany, Hungary, Iceland, Romania, Singapore, Slovakia, Spain, Switzerland, Taiwan, and Thailand.

In Russia, the film was scheduled to be released on 19 June 2025, but in April, the Russian Ministry of Culture refused to issue a distribution certificate.

== Reception ==
On the review aggregator website Rotten Tomatoes, 90% of 10 critics' reviews are positive.

Jordan Mintzer of The Hollywood Reporter wrote, "So much crude humor can grow exhausting in places ... but the filmmakers manage to keep things fast-paced and funny enough".

Muriel Del Don of Cineuropa found the film "captivating and irreverent".

Martin Kudlac of ScreenAnarchy found that the film "deftly balances" the two storylines, "making the journey of the sperms both an epic quest and a hilarious romp, while Jens and Lisa's story grounds the film in relatable teenage experiences."

Tasha Robinson of Polygon found the film's plot "shallow" and the humour "juvenile", but the songs "catchy", the storytelling "weird and playful", and the parody elements "specific and pointed".

Diego Semerene of Slant Magazine found the film to be "rife with playful metaphors and lacking all shame" and "a hilarious portrait of heterosexual relations in Northern Europe".
