= List of Universal Pictures films (2020–2029) =

This is a list of films produced or distributed by Universal Pictures from 2020 to 2029, founded in 1912 as the Universal Film Manufacturing Company. It is the main motion picture production and distribution arm of Universal Studios, a subsidiary of the NBCUniversal division of Comcast.

All films listed are theatrical releases unless specified.

Films with a § signify a simultaneous release to theaters and on Peacock.
Films with a ‡ signify a release exclusively to Peacock.
Films with a * signify a release exclusively to a third-party streaming service in North America.

== 2020 ==
Release date	Title	Notes
January 10, 2020	Seberg	distribution in the U.K., Ireland, Latin America, Spain, Italy, the Nordics, the Benelux, Eastern Europe, Greece, Cyprus, Israel and Asia excluding Japan and Korea only; produced by Automatik Entertainment, Bradley Pilz Productions, Phreaker Films, Ingenious Media and Totally Commercial Films
January 17, 2020	Dolittle	co-production with Roth/Kirschenbaum Films and Team Downey
January 24, 2020	The Turning (Note: Co-owned by Content Partners LLC)	distribution in North and Latin America, France, Germany, Austria, Switzerland, Russia, Japan, Taiwan, Thailand, Malaysia, Singapore and the Philippines only; produced by DreamWorks Pictures, Reliance Entertainment and Vertigo Entertainment
February 14, 2020	The Photograph	co-production with Will Packer Productions
February 27, 2020	The Wolf Hour	distribution in all media excluding airlines and ships in Latin America, Australia, New Zealand, the Benelux, the Nordics, Italy, Spain, the Middle East, Israel, India, Indonesia, Korea, Hong Kong, Taiwan, Poland, Hungary, Romania, Bulgaria, the Czech Republic and Slovakia only; produced by Automatik and Bradley Pilz Productions
February 28, 2020	The Invisible Man	distribution only; produced by Blumhouse Productions and Goalpost Pictures
March 13, 2020	The Hunt	co-production with Blumhouse Productions (Note: In mid-March 2020, movie theaters began to close because of the COVID-19 pandemic lockdown measures. One week after the film's release, on March 16, 2020, Universal Pictures announced that the film would be available digitally through premium VOD in the United States and Canada on March 20, before the end of the usual 90-day theatrical run.)
April 10, 2020	Trolls World Tour	distribution only; produced by DreamWorks Animation; co-distributed in Japan by GAGA (Note: The film was originally planned to be released theatrically in the United States on this date. However, on March 16, Universal Pictures announced that the film would be released simultaneously in drive-in theaters, as regular movie theaters closed due to the restrictions caused by the COVID-19 pandemic, and through premium VOD in the United States, Canada, United Kingdom, South Korea, and Italy. This affected the number of projections and the box office performance of the screenings. As the pandemic receded, the film was released back in regular theaters.)
June 12, 2020	The King of Staten Island	co-production with Apatow Productions (Note: Released on premium VOD in United States and Canada on this date, and later released in theaters in select countries with relaxed COVID-19 restrictions beginning June 25, 2020. As the pandemic receded, the film was released back in regular theaters.)
June 18, 2020	You Should Have Left	distribution only; produced by Blumhouse Productions (Note: Released on premium VOD in United States and Canada on this date due to the movie theater closures since mid March because of the COVID-19 pandemic restrictions.)
October 2, 2020	Vampires vs. the Bronx *	co-production with Broadway Video and Caviar; distributed by Netflix
November 13, 2020	Freaky	distribution only; produced by Blumhouse Productions and Divide/Conquer
November 25, 2020	The Croods: A New Age	distribution only; produced by DreamWorks Animation
November 26, 2020	David Byrne's American Utopia	international distribution only; produced by Participant, River Road Entertainment, Warner Music Entertainment, Todomundo, RadicalMedia and 40 Acres and a Mule Filmworks
December 4, 2020	All My Life	co-production with Broken Road Entertainment
December 25, 2020	News of the World	North American distribution only; co-production with Playtone, Pretty Pictures and Perfect World Pictures; international distribution by Netflix

== 2021 ==
Release date	Title	Notes
March 26, 2021	Nobody	distribution only; produced by 87North Productions, Odenkirk Provissiero Entertainment, Eighty Two Films and Perfect World Pictures
March 28, 2021	Tina	international distribution outside the U.K. and Ireland only; produced by Altitude Film Entertainment, Lightbox and Media Finance Capital
June 4, 2021	Spirit Untamed	distribution only; produced by DreamWorks Animation
June 23, 2021	Good on Paper *	co-production with Burn Later Productions and Meridian Content; distributed by Netflix
June 25, 2021	F9	co-production with Original Film, One Race Films, Perfect Storm Entertainment and Roth/Kirschenbaum Films (Note: Released in international theaters on May 19, 2021.)
July 2, 2021	The Boss Baby: Family Business §	distribution only; produced by DreamWorks Animation; co-distributed in Japan by GAGA
July 2, 2021	The Forever Purge	co-production with Blumhouse Productions, Platinum Dunes and Man in a Tree Productions; co-distributed in Japan by Parco
July 23, 2021	Old	distribution only; produced by Blinding Edge Pictures
August 13, 2021	Respect	home media and theatrical distribution outside the U.S., Italy, Scandinavia, Portugal, Poland, Hungary, Romania, Bulgaria, the Czech Republic, Slovakia, the Middle East, Israel and South Africa only; produced by Metro-Goldwyn-Mayer, Bron Creative, Glickmania and One Community; co-distributed in Japan by GAGA
August 18, 2021	People Just Do Nothing: Big in Japan	distribution only; produced by Focus Features, BBC Film and Roughcut Films
August 27, 2021	Candyman	distribution in all media excluding international digital and television outside Italy, Scandinavia, Portugal, Poland, Hungary, Romania, Bulgaria, the Czech Republic, Slovakia, the Middle East, Israel and South Africa only; co-production with Metro-Goldwyn-Mayer, Monkeypaw Productions and Bron Creative
September 17, 2021	This Is the Night	distribution only; produced by Blumhouse Productions and Man in a Tree Productions
September 24, 2021	Dear Evan Hansen	co-production with Marc Platt Productions and Perfect World Pictures
October 1, 2021	The Addams Family 2	home media and theatrical distribution outside the U.S., Italy, Scandinavia, Portugal, Poland, Hungary, Romania, Bulgaria, the Czech Republic, Slovakia, the Middle East, Israel and South Africa only; produced by Metro-Goldwyn-Mayer, Bron Studios, Creative Wealth Media, Cinesite, Nitrogen Studios, and The Jackal Group; co-distributed in Japan by Parco
October 8, 2021	No Time to Die	home media and theatrical distribution outside the U.S., Scandinavia, Portugal, Mozambique, Poland, Hungary, Romania, Bulgaria, the Czech Republic, Slovakia, the Middle East and Israel only; produced by Metro-Goldwyn-Mayer and Eon Productions (Note: Released in international theaters on September 29, 2021.)
October 15, 2021	Halloween Kills §	distribution only; produced by Miramax, Blumhouse Productions, Trancas International Pictures, and Rough House Pictures; co-distributed in Japan by Parco
November 5, 2021	Finch *	studio credit only; co-production with ImageMovers, DreamWorks Pictures, Amblin Entertainment, Reliance Entertainment, Walden Media and Misher Films; distributed by Apple TV+ (Note: The film was originally scheduled to be released by Universal Pictures, but distribution rights were sold to Apple TV+.)
November 24, 2021	House of Gucci	home media and theatrical distribution outside the U.S., Italy, Scandinavia, Portugal, Poland, Hungary, Romania, Bulgaria, the Czech Republic, Slovakia, the Middle East, Israel and South Africa only; produced by Metro-Goldwyn-Mayer, Bron Creative and Scott Free Productions
November 26, 2021	Licorice Pizza	home media and theatrical distribution outside the U.S., Italy, Scandinavia, Portugal, Poland, Hungary, Romania, Bulgaria, the Czech Republic, Slovakia, the Middle East, Israel and South Africa only; produced by Metro-Goldwyn-Mayer, Focus Features, Bron Creative and Ghoulardi Film Company; co-distributed in Japan by Bitters End and Parco
December 22, 2021	Sing 2	co-production with Illumination

== 2022 ==
Release date	Title	Notes
January 7, 2022	The 355	U.S., U.K. and Irish distribution only; produced by Freckle Films, FilmNation Entertainment and Genre Films
January 21, 2022	Redeeming Love	distribution outside the U.K., Ireland, France, the Middle East and South Africa only; co-production with Nthibah Pictures, Pinnacle Peak Pictures and Mission Pictures International
February 11, 2022	Marry Me §	co-production with Perfect World Pictures and Nuyorican Productions
February 25, 2022	Cyrano	home media and theatrical distribution outside the U.S., Italy, Scandinavia, Portugal, Poland, Hungary, Romania, Bulgaria, the Czech Republic, Slovakia, the Middle East, Israel and South Africa only; produced by Metro-Goldwyn-Mayer, Bron Creative and Working Title Films
March 24, 2022	Moonage Daydream	international distribution only; produced by BMG, Live Nation Entertainment and Public Road Productions; co-distributed in Japan by Parco
April 8, 2022	Ambulance	distribution only; produced by New Republic Pictures, Bay Films and Endeavor Content
April 22, 2022	The Bad Guys	distribution only; produced by DreamWorks Animation; co-distributed in Japan by GAGA
May 13, 2022	Firestarter §	distribution only; produced by Blumhouse Productions and Weed Road Pictures
June 10, 2022	Jurassic World Dominion	co-production with Amblin Entertainment, The Kennedy/Marshall Company and Perfect World Pictures
June 24, 2022	The Black Phone	distribution only; produced by Blumhouse Productions and Crooked Highway
July 1, 2022	Minions: The Rise of Gru	co-production with Illumination
July 1, 2022	Mr. Malcolm's List	international distribution outside France only; produced by Blinder Films, Rebelle Media, Refinery29, and Untitled Entertainment; Bleecker Street handles the North American distribution
July 14, 2022	The Phantom of the Open	distribution in Latin America, Australia, New Zealand, Germany, Austria, Italy, the Benelux, Greece, Cyprus, Portugal, Eastern Europe, the CIS, the Baltics, India, Indonesia, Taiwan, Africa, the Middle East, Israel and Turkey only; produced by the BFI, BBC Film, Ingenious Media, Water & Power Productions, Baby Cow Films and Cornerstone Films
July 22, 2022	Nope	co-production with Monkeypaw Productions
August 5, 2022	Easter Sunday	distribution in North and Latin America, France, Germany, Austria, Switzerland, Japan, Taiwan, Thailand, Malaysia, Singapore and the Philippines only; produced by DreamWorks Pictures, Amblin Partners and Rideback
August 12, 2022	Emily the Criminal	international distribution only; produced by Low Spark Films, Fear Knot Productions and Evil Hag Productions
August 19, 2022	Beast	co-production with RVK Studios and Will Packer Productions
September 30, 2022	Bros	co-production with Apatow Productions and Global Solutions
October 14, 2022	Halloween Ends §	distribution only; produced by Miramax, Blumhouse Productions, Trancas International Pictures, and Rough House Pictures; co-distributed in Japan by Parco
October 14, 2022	Till	home media and theatrical distribution outside the U.S., Italy, Scandinavia, Portugal, Poland, Hungary, Romania, Bulgaria, the Czech Republic, Slovakia, the Middle East, Israel and South Africa only; produced by Orion Pictures, Frederick Zollo Productions and Eon Productions; co-distributed in Japan by Parco
October 21, 2022	Ticket to Paradise	co-production with Red Om Films, Smokehouse Pictures and Working Title Films
November 11, 2022	The Fabelmans	distribution in North and Latin America, France, Germany, Austria, Switzerland, Spain, Andorra, Japan, Taiwan, Thailand, Malaysia, Singapore and the Philippines only; produced by Amblin Entertainment and Reliance Entertainment
November 18, 2022	She Said	co-production with Annapurna Pictures and Plan B Entertainment
December 2, 2022	Violent Night	co-production with 87North Productions
December 21, 2022	Puss in Boots: The Last Wish	distribution only; produced by DreamWorks Animation; co-distributed in Japan by GAGA
December 23, 2022	Women Talking	home media and theatrical distribution outside the U.S., Italy, Scandinavia, Portugal, Poland, Hungary, Romania, Bulgaria, the Czech Republic, Slovakia, the Middle East, Israel and South Africa only; produced by Orion Pictures, Plan B Entertainment and Hear/Say Productions; co-distributed in Japan by Parco

== 2023 ==
Release date	Title	Notes
January 6, 2023	M3GAN	distribution only; produced by Blumhouse Productions and Atomic Monster
February 3, 2023	Knock at the Cabin	distribution only; produced by Blinding Edge Pictures, Wishmore and FilmNation Entertainment
February 24, 2023	Cocaine Bear	co-production with Brownstone Productions and Lord Miller Productions; co-distributed in Japan by Parco
March 17, 2023	Pearl	international distribution outside the CIS and Japan only; produced by A24, Little Lamb Productions and Mad Solar; co-distributed by Cinépolis and Que Ciné in Latin America and Madman Entertainment in Australia and New Zealand
April 5, 2023	The Super Mario Bros. Movie	distribution only; produced by Illumination and Nintendo
April 7, 2023	Praise This ‡	co-production with Will Packer Productions; distributed by Peacock
April 14, 2023	Renfield	co-production with Skybound Entertainment and Giant Wildcat
May 19, 2023	Fast X	co-production with Original Film, Roth/Kirschenbaum Films, One Race Films and Perfect Storm Entertainment
June 2, 2023	Shooting Stars ‡	co-production with SpringHill Company; distributed by Peacock
June 8, 2023	The Adults	international distribution only; co-production with Dweck Productions and Savage Rose Films
June 15, 2023	Sanctuary	international distribution outside Italy, Australia, New Zealand, the CIS and the Baltics only; produced by Rumble Films
June 30, 2023	Ruby Gillman, Teenage Kraken	distribution only; produced by DreamWorks Animation
July 21, 2023	Oppenheimer	Winner of the Academy Award for Best Picture; Winner of the Golden Globe Award for Best Motion Picture – Drama co-production with Syncopy and Atlas Entertainment; co-distributed in Japan by Bitters End
August 11, 2023	The Last Voyage of the Demeter	distribution in North and Latin America, France, Germany, Austria, Switzerland, Japan, Taiwan, Thailand, Malaysia, Singapore and the Philippines only; produced by DreamWorks Pictures, Reliance Entertainment, Storyworks Productions, Studio Babelsberg, Phoenix Pictures and Wise Owl Media
August 18, 2023	Strays	co-production with Picturestart, Rabbit Hole Productions and Lord Miller Productions
October 1, 2023	Oracle *	co-production with Will Packer Productions; distributed by Max
October 6, 2023	The Exorcist: Believer	distribution only; produced by Blumhouse Productions, Morgan Creek Entertainment and Rough House Pictures
October 27, 2023	Five Nights at Freddy's §	distribution only; produced by Blumhouse Productions and Scott Cawthon Productions
November 3, 2023	The Royal Hotel	distribution in the U.K., Ireland, Latin America, France, Germany, Austria, Switzerland, Italy, Scandinavia, the Benelux, the Baltics, South Africa, Turkey, Israel and Asia excluding Japan only; produced by See-Saw Films, Screen Australia, South Australian Film Corporation, Screen NSW, HanWay Films, Cross City Films and Alma Margo
November 17, 2023	Please Don't Destroy: The Treasure of Foggy Mountain ‡	co-production with Apatow Productions and Mosaic Media Group; distributed by Peacock
November 17, 2023	Trolls Band Together	distribution only; produced by DreamWorks Animation
November 24, 2023	Genie ‡	co-production with Working Title Films and Linden Productions; distributed by Peacock
December 22, 2023	Migration	co-production with Illumination

== 2024 ==
Release date	Title	Notes
January 5, 2024	Night Swim	distribution only; produced by Blumhouse Productions and Atomic Monster
January 15, 2024	She Came to Me	distribution in all media excluding airlines in Latin America, Australia, New Zealand, South Africa, Germany, Austria, Switzerland, Greece, Cyprus, Italy, the Nordics, the Middle East, Israel, Turkey, India, Indonesia, Malaysia, Brunei, Vietnam, the Philippines, Singapore, Taiwan, Thailand and Asian pay television only; produced by AI Film, Killer Films, Round Films and Somewhere Pictures
February 2, 2024	Argylle	theatrical and VOD distribution only; produced by Apple Studios, Marv Studios and Cloudy Productions
March 8, 2024	Kung Fu Panda 4	distribution only; produced by DreamWorks Animation
April 5, 2024	Monkey Man	distribution outside Latin America, Spain, Poland, former Yugoslavia, the CIS, the Baltics, Iceland, China, Hong Kong, Indonesia and pan-Asian pay television only; produced by Bron Studios, Creative Wealth Media, Thunder Road Films, Minor Realm, S'Ya Concept, Monkeypaw Productions and WME Independent; co-distributed in Japan by Parco
April 12, 2024	Woody Woodpecker Goes to Camp *	co-production with Universal Animation Studios and Universal 1440 Entertainment; distributed by Netflix
April 19, 2024	Abigail	co-production with Radio Silence Productions and Project X Entertainment
May 3, 2024	The Fall Guy	co-production with 87North Productions and Entertainment 360
July 3, 2024	Despicable Me 4	co-production with Illumination
July 19, 2024	Twisters	North American distribution only; co-production with Warner Bros. Pictures, Amblin Entertainment and The Kennedy/Marshall Company (Note: Released in international theaters on July 10, 2024.)
August 9, 2024	Babes	international distribution outside the CIS and Japan only; produced by FilmNation Entertainment, Range Media Partners and Starrpix
August 23, 2024	The Killer ‡	co-production with Atlas Entertainment, Entertainment One, Fortune Star Media Limited and A Better Tomorrow Films; distributed by Peacock
September 13, 2024	Speak No Evil	co-production with Blumhouse Productions
September 20, 2024	The Substance	copyright holder and studio credit only; produced by Working Title Films, Blacksmith and The Match Factory; distributed by Mubi
September 27, 2024	The Wild Robot	distribution only; produced by DreamWorks Animation; co-distributed in Japan by GAGA
November 22, 2024	Wicked	co-production with Marc Platt Productions (Note: Released in Australia and Mexico theaters on November 21, 2024.)
December 6, 2024	Y2K	international distribution outside the CIS and Japan only; produced by A24, Strong Baby Productions and American Light & Fixture

== 2025 ==
Release date	Title	Notes
January 17, 2025	Wolf Man	distribution only; produced by Blumhouse Productions and Cloak & Co.
January 31, 2025	Dog Man	distribution only; produced by DreamWorks Animation
February 7, 2025	Love Hurts	co-production with 87North Productions
February 13, 2025	Bridget Jones: Mad About the Boy §	distribution outside France only; co-production with Working Title Films, Miramax and StudioCanal; co-distributed by Peacock in the U.S.
February 27, 2025	The Last Journey	international distribution outside Scandinavia only; produced by Nordisk Film, Nexiko and RMV Film
March 28, 2025	The Woman in the Yard	co-production with Blumhouse Productions
April 11, 2025	Drop	distribution only; produced by Blumhouse Productions and Platinum Dunes
May 1, 2025	Death of a Unicorn	distribution in Latin America, France, Germany, Austria, Switzerland, Spain, Portugal, Mozambique, Greece, Cyprus, Eastern Europe, South Africa, the Middle East, Israel, Turkey and Asia excluding Japan only; produced by A24, Ley Line Entertainment, Square Peg, Secret Engine, Monoceros Media and The Royal Budapest Film Co
May 8, 2025	King Ivory	international distribution only; produced by Roxwell Films
May 9, 2025	The Wedding Banquet	international distribution only; produced by ShivHans Pictures, Kindred Spirit and Symbolic Exchange
May 16, 2025	Hallow Road	select international distribution only; produced by XYZ Films, LNDN. and Two and Two Pictures
June 13, 2025	How to Train Your Dragon	co-production with DreamWorks Pictures (uncredited), DreamWorks Animation and Marc Platt Productions
June 27, 2025	M3GAN 2.0	distribution only; produced by Blumhouse Productions and Atomic Monster
July 2, 2025	Jurassic World Rebirth	co-production with Amblin Entertainment and The Kennedy/Marshall Company
July 3, 2025	Long Distance *	co-production with DreamWorks Pictures, Amblin Partners, Reliance Entertainment and Automatik; distributed by Hulu in the U.S.
July 30, 2025	War of the Worlds *	co-production with Bazelevs Company and Patrick Aiello Productions; distributed by Amazon Prime Video
August 1, 2025	The Bad Guys 2	distribution only; produced by DreamWorks Animation; co-distributed in Japan by GAGA
August 15, 2025	Nobody 2	co-production with 87North Productions, Odenkirk Provissiero Entertainment and Eighty Two Films
September 19, 2025	Him	co-production with Monkeypaw Productions
September 25, 2025	Prime Minister	international distribution only; produced by MWM and Dark Doris Entertainment
September 26, 2025	Gabby's Dollhouse: The Movie	distribution only; produced by DreamWorks Animation
October 17, 2025	Black Phone 2	distribution only; produced by Blumhouse Productions
November 21, 2025	Wicked: For Good	co-production with Marc Platt Productions
December 5, 2025	Five Nights at Freddy's 2	distribution only; produced by Blumhouse Productions, Scott Cawthon Productions and Mind Hive Films

== 2026 ==
Release date	Title	Notes
January 8, 2026	It's Never Over, Jeff Buckley	international co-distribution with Piece of Magic Entertainment only; produced by Topic Studios, Fremantle, Disarming Films and Plan B Entertainment
January 30, 2026	The Moment	select international distribution only; produced by A24, 2AM, Studio365, Good World and Atlantic Records
February 6, 2026	Stray Kids: The dominATE Experience	international distribution outside China, Japan and Korea only; produced by Live Nation
February 19, 2026	EPiC: Elvis Presley in Concert	international distribution only; produced by Sony Music Vision, Authentic Studios and Bazmark Films
March 13, 2026	Reminders of Him	co-production with Heartbones Entertainment and Little Engine Productions
April 1, 2026	The Super Mario Galaxy Movie	distribution only; produced by Illumination and Nintendo
April 10, 2026	You, Me & Tuscany	co-production with Will Packer Productions
April 24, 2026	Michael	international distribution outside Russia and Japan only; co-production with Lionsgate, GK Films and Optimum Productions (Note: Released in international theaters on April 22, 2026.)
June 12, 2026	Disclosure Day	co-production with Amblin Entertainment
June 12, 2026	Stop! That! Train!	international distribution only; produced by Unapologetic Projects and World of Wonder
June 26, 2026	Strung ‡	co-production with Peachtree & Vine Productions, Blumhouse Productions, and Blackmaled Productions; distributed by Peacock
July 1, 2026	Minions & Monsters	co-production with Illumination
July 17, 2026	The Odyssey	co-production with Syncopy
August 1, 2026	Soulm8te	direct-to-video; co-production with Atomic Monster and Blumhouse Productions
August 7, 2026	One Night Only	co-production with Olive Bridge Entertainment
September 15, 2026	The Last Kiss	direct-to-video; co-production with Blumhouse Atomic Monster and Man in a Tree
September 25, 2026	Forgotten Island	distribution only; produced by DreamWorks Animation
October 9, 2026	Other Mommy	distribution only; produced by Blumhouse Atomic Monster

== Upcoming ==
Release date	Title	Notes	Production status
November 25, 2026	Focker-in-Law	North American distribution only; co-production with Paramount Pictures, Tribeca Enterprises, Red Hour Productions and Particular Pictures	Completed
December 4, 2026	Violent Night 2	co-production with 87North Productions	Completed
January 15, 2027	Musk	international distribution only; produced by Double Agent, Jigsaw Productions, AC Independent and Closer Media	Completed
January 15, 2027	River	North American and select international distribution with Blumhouse Atomic only; produced by Spooky Pictures, Eat the Cat, and Upgrade	Completed
February 5, 2027	The Comeback King	co-production with Apatow Productions, Barnstorm and Misher Films	Completed
February 5, 2027	Twice: This Is For... You	international distribution only; produced by Live Nation Studios	Post-production
February 19, 2027	CoComelon: The Movie	distribution only; produced by DreamWorks Animation, Prime Focus Studios, Moonbug Entertainment and Flywheel Media	Post-production
March 12, 2027	The Exorcist: Martyrs	co-production with Blumhouse Atomic, Morgan Creek Entertainment and Red Room Pictures	Post-production
April 16, 2027	Not Alone	co-production with Illumination	Post-production
May 21, 2027	The Catch	co-production with 21 Laps Entertainment and Fruit Tree	Post-production
June 11, 2027	How to Train Your Dragon 2	co-production with DreamWorks Animation, Marc Platt Productions and Vertigo Entertainment	Post-production
June 30, 2027	Shrek 5	distribution only; produced by DreamWorks Animation	Completed
August 6, 2027	Snoop	co-production with Imagine Entertainment and Death Row Pictures	Filming
September 24, 2027	Nico Bravo	distribution only; produced by DreamWorks Animation	Pre-production
October 8, 2027	Sleepover	co-production with Blumhouse Atomic	Pre-production
October 15, 2027	The Mummy: Book of the Dead	co-production with Radio Silence Productions and Project X Entertainment	Filming
November 5, 2027	Naughty	co-production with LuckyChap Entertainment	Filming
November 19, 2027	Untitled Daniels film	co-production with Playgrounds	Filming
February 4, 2028	Murder, She Wrote	co-production with Pascal Pictures and Lord Miller	Pre-production
March 17, 2028	Fast Forever	co-production with Original Film, One Race Films, Seven Bucks Productions and Roth/Kirschenbaum Films	Pre-production
April 12, 2028	Untitled Illumination/Nintendo film	distribution only; produced by Illumination and Nintendo	Pre-production
May 19, 2028	Miami Vice '85	co-production with Dylan Clark Productions and Monolith Pictures	Filming
June 30, 2028	Donkey	distribution only; produced by DreamWorks Animation	In production

=== Undated films ===
Release window	Title	Notes	Production Status
Q1 2029	Untitled third Super Mario film	distribution only; produced by Illumination and Nintendo	Pre-production
TBA	24/7	co-production with Feigco Entertainment, Simpson Street, and UnbeliEVAble Entertainment	Pre-production
TBA	Ashley's War	co-production with Hello Sunshine and Made Up Stories	Pre-production
TBA	Baby Monster	co-production with Studio 8	Pre-production
TBA	Batshit	co-production with Silk Mass Banner	Pre-production
TBA	Big Tree	co-production with Amblin Entertainment and Illumination	Pre-production
TBA	Bond 26	international theatrical distribution only; produced by Metro-Goldwyn-Mayer, Pascal Pictures, Heyday Films and Villeneuve Films	Pre-production
TBA	The Caretaker	co-production with Platinum Dunes, 12:01 Films and Fifty-Fifty Films	Pre-production
TBA	Merrily We Roll Along	co-production with Blumhouse Productions and Detour Filmproduction	Filming
TBA	The Mole People	co-production with Skybound Entertainment	Pre-production
TBA	New Kid	co-production with SpringHill Company and A Penny for Your Thoughts Entertainment	Pre-production
TBA	Untitled Jordan Peele film	co-production with Monkeypaw Productions	Pre-production

=== In development ===
Title	Notes
Confession of Murder	co-production with Barnstorm and Winged Tiger
Creature from the Black Lagoon	co-production with Blumhouse Atomic
The Cruel Prince	co-production with Michael De Luca Productions
Dance Parents	co-production with Secret Menu, Free Association and Megamix
Everyday Parenting Tips	co-production with Lord Miller and Maximum Effort
Fight	co-production with 87North Productions and NeoText Corporation
The Griffin Sisters' Greatest Hits	
The Hider	co-production with Team Downey and Safehouse Pictures
John Proctor Is the Villain	co-production with Little Stranger and Marc Platt Productions
Jurassic World 5	co-production with Amblin Entertainment
Just Cause	co-production with 87North Productions, Avalanche Studios, Square Enix and Story Kitchen
Kung Fu Panda 5	distribution only; produced by DreamWorks Animation
Limited Edition	co-production with 87North Productions
Long Lost	co-production with Amblin Entertainment
The Magic School Bus	co-production with Marc Platt Productions and Scholastic Entertainment
Monster High	co-production with Mattel Studios and Weed Road Pictures
The Night of the Hunter	co-production with KramMar Delicious Mystery Productions and Pascal Pictures
OutRun	co-production with Sega Sammy Group, Platinum Dunes and Bayhem Films
Par for the Course	co-production with Point Grey Pictures and Fifth Chance
Paradox, Inc.	co-production with Lord Miller
The Partner	co-production with Billy17, Rideback and Aggregate Films
Phantom	co-production with Get Lifted Film Company
The Premonition: A Pandemic Story	co-production with Lord Miller Productions and Pascal Pictures
Ride Along 3	co-production with Cube Vision, Hartbeat Productions and The Story Company
Rock 'Em Sock 'Em Robots	co-production with Mattel Studios and One Race Films
Ruiner	co-production with 87North Productions, Oddball Entertainment, Story Kitchen and Reikon Games
Saturation Point	co-production with Platinum Dunes and Edith's Daughter
Scar Tissue	co-production with Imagine Entertainment
The Season of Passage	co-production with Intrepid Pictures
The Secret Life of Pets 3	co-production with Illumination
Shinobi	co-production with Marc Platt Productions, Story Kitchen and Sega Sammy Group
Sing 3	co-production with Illumination
The Six	co-production with Lord Miller
Six Clean Kills	co-production with Secret Menu and Blueeyes Productions
Storybook Ending	co-production with Anvil Pictures
Stranded Asset	co-production with Indivisible Productions
Untitled Alice in Wonderland musical film	co-production with Marc Platt Productions and Alloy Entertainment
Untitled Bela Lugosi biopic film	co-production with Appian Way Productions
Untitled Bon Jovi biopic film	co-production with Religion of Sports
Untitled Jake Steinfeld biopic film	
Untitled Judd Apatow and Nikki Glaser romantic comedy	co-production with Apatow Productions
Untitled Keke Palmer and Lena Dunham romantic comedy	co-production with Good Thing Going Productions
Untitled Leah McKendrick monster film	co-production with Blumhouse Atomic
Untitled Lou Gehrig film	co-production with Broadway Video, Barnstorm and Detour Filmproduction
Untitled Lucas Brothers comedy film	co-production with Lord Miller Productions
Untitled Nicholas Sparks film	co-production with Anonymous Content
Untitled Operation Epic Fury film	
Untitled live-action/animated Lego film	co-production with The Lego Group and Rideback
Untitled live-action Lego film directed by Jake Kasdan	co-production with The Lego Group
Untitled live-action Lego film directed by Patty Jenkins	co-production with The Lego Group
Untitled live-action Lego film directed by Joe Cornish	co-production with The Lego Group
Untitled live-action Lego Ninjago film	co-production with The Lego Group
Untitled Wicked spin-off film	
We Are Your Pets	co-production with Amblin Entertainment
The Wild Robot Escapes	distribution only; produced by DreamWorks Animation
The Woman in Me	co-production with Marc Platt Productions

== See also ==
- List of DreamWorks Animation productions
- List of Focus Features films
- List of Illumination productions
- List of Universal Pictures theatrical animated feature films

== Notes ==
Release notes

Studio/production notes
