= Wirkola =

Surname list

Wirkola is a surname. Notable people with the surname include:

- Bjørn Wirkola (born 1943), Norwegian ski jumper
- Tommy Wirkola (born 1979), Norwegian film director, producer, and screenwriter

== See also ==
- Jumping after Wirkola, Norwergian idiom
