= 87North Productions =

American film production company

- Type: Private
- Industry: Film; Television
- Founded: 2019; 7 years ago
- Founders: David Leitch; Kelly McCormick
- Headquarters: Santa Monica, California, United States
- Key people: David Leitch; Kelly McCormick; Braden Aftergood
- Website: 87north.com

87North Productions is an American independent film and television production company, founded in 2019 by David Leitch and Kelly McCormick. The company is known for producing the films Nobody, Bullet Train, Violent Night and The Fall Guy.

On April 22, 2019, the company signed a first-look deal with Universal Pictures.

== Overview ==
David Leitch and Kelly McCormick founded 87North Productions in 2019, after Leitch left 87Eleven Entertainment. On April 22, 2019, the company signed a deal with Universal Pictures, and in the process, acquired the 2021 film Nobody from STX Entertainment. Under the first-look deal with Universal, Leitch directed and produced The Fall Guy (2024), a film adaptation of the 1980s television show starring Ryan Gosling and Emily Blunt.

On December 10, 2025, Braden Aftergood joined the company to lead the film division.

=== Projects in development ===
The company has several projects in development with Universal. This includes the action films Kung Fu and Versus. Other films in development are Ruby, a female assassin action film written by Kat Wood for Amazon MGM Studios, and an untitled film based on, and starring, American rock band Weezer. The company is set to produce a television series adaptation of My Friend Pedro, based on the video game of the same name.

== Feature films ==
Release date	Title	Director(s)	Distributor
March 26, 2021	Nobody	Ilya Naishuller	Universal Pictures
September 10, 2021	Kate	Cedric Nicolas-Troyan	Netflix
August 5, 2022	Bullet Train	David Leitch	Sony Pictures Releasing
December 2, 2022	Violent Night	Tommy Wirkola	Universal Pictures
May 3, 2024	The Fall Guy	David Leitch	Universal Pictures
February 7, 2025	Love Hurts	Jonathan Eusebio	Universal Pictures
August 15, 2025	Nobody 2	Timo Tjahjanto	Universal Pictures
March 25, 2026	Pretty Lethal	Vicky Jewson	Amazon Prime Video
April 24, 2026	Over Your Dead Body	Jorma Taccone	Independent Film Company
November 13, 2026	How to Rob a Bank	David Leitch	Amazon MGM Studios

=== Upcoming films ===
Release date	Title	Director(s)	Distributor
December 4, 2026	Violent Night 2	Tommy Wirkola	Universal Pictures
August 6, 2027	Jason Statham Stole My Bike	David Leitch	Black Bear Pictures

== Short films ==
Release date	Title	Director(s)	Ref.
April 21, 2023	The Chase for Carrera	Nash Edgerton	

== Television series ==
Year	Title	Creator(s)	Network	Ref.
2024	Action	—N/a	Peacock	

== See also ==
- 87Eleven Entertainment
