= Over Your Dead Body (2026 film) =

2026 film by Jorma Taccone

- Theatrical release poster
- Directed by: Jorma Taccone
- Screenplay by: Nick Kocher; Brian McElhaney
- Based on: I onde dager by: Tommy Wirkola; Nick Ball; John Niven
- Produced by: Kelly McCormick; David Leitch; Aram Tertzakian; Nick Spicer; Guy Danella; Lee Kim
- Starring: Jason Segel; Samara Weaving; Paul Guilfoyle; Keith Jardine; Timothy Olyphant; Juliette Lewis
- Cinematography: Matt Weston
- Edited by: Jeremy Cohen
- Music by: Matthew Compton
- Production companies: 87North Productions; XYZ Films
- Distributed by: Independent Film Company (United States); Amazon Prime Video (international)
- Release dates: March 14, 2026 (SXSW); April 24, 2026 (United States)
- Running time: 107 minutes
- Country: United States
- Language: English
- Box office: $2.4 million

Over Your Dead Body is a 2026 American action comedy thriller film directed by Jorma Taccone, and written by Nick Kocher and Brian McElhaney. It is an English-language remake of the 2021 Norwegian film The Trip. It stars Jason Segel, Samara Weaving, Paul Guilfoyle, Keith Jardine, Timothy Olyphant, and Juliette Lewis.

== Plot ==
Years after making his only feature film, struggling director Dan Burton is reduced to shooting pop-up ads. He is unhappily married to Lisa, an aspiring actress. After visiting his father Michael at a nursing home, Dan sets off with Lisa for a weekend at their lakeside cabin, where he plans to murder her with the help of Henry, an ex-convict acquaintance.

At the cabin, Dan prepares to chloroform Lisa, only for her to taser and tie him up. Awakening, Dan admits to planning to strangle Lisa, dismember her body, and dump it in the lake. Lisa reveals her own plan to murder Dan in a staged hunting accident with one of his father's guns. As they confront the rift in their marriage, including Dan's money troubles and Lisa's infidelity, Henry arrives and knocks Lisa unconscious.

Upon waking, Lisa realizes Henry was promised half of her $100,000 life insurance policy. She reveals to Henry that they each have a $1 million policy. The three turn on each other, and Henry is accidentally shot dead when Dan and Lisa struggle for the gun. Chasing each other through the house, the couple are knocked out when fugitives Pete, Todd, and Allegra fall through the attic.

Tying up the couple in the basement and taking Michael's guns, Pete explains that he and Todd are convicted killers who recently escaped prison with Allegra, an unstable corrections officer in love with Pete. On the run, they broke into the cabin and hid when Dan and Lisa arrived. They demand money and prepare to rape and kill Dan, but Lisa offers to take them to the bank in the morning.

Dan tricks Todd into untying him to use the bathroom, then knocks him out and flees. Lisa soon follows, and retrieves the boat key as the fugitives hunt for the couple outside. Dan intervenes when Lisa is held at gunpoint by Todd, and they brutally subdue him, hiding in a closet when Pete and Allegra return. Determined to save Lisa, Dan overpowers Pete and the couple attempts to escape, but is recaptured.

Pete prepares to kill Dan with a lawnmower, severing two of his fingers in the process. They are interrupted by Michael, who was alerted by a neighbor and stole a nurse's car to reach the cabin. Disarming Pete and blowing Todd's head off, Michael is stabbed by Allegra but shoots her in the foot, urging Dan to run. As Pete fatally pushes Michael onto the mower, the couple flee in the car but soon crash, and Dan convinces Lisa to take the boat.

Abandoned by Pete, the wounded Allegra is confronted by Dan, who breaks her leg and shoots her in the face. Pete commandeers the boat with a captive Lisa, but Dan climbs aboard, leading to a vicious struggle. Using a bag of rocks and an anchor to drown Pete, Lisa saves Dan and recovers his severed fingers and wedding ring.

The couple reconciles, apologizing for planning to kill each other and agreeing to repair their marriage. Publicizing the story of their survival, they capitalize on their newfound fame as Dan directs Lisa in a straight-to-streaming film adaptation.

== Cast ==
- Jason Segel as Dan
- Samara Weaving as Lisa
- Paul Guilfoyle as Michael
- Keith Jardine as Todd
- Timothy Olyphant as Pete
- Juliette Lewis as Allegra
- Jake Curran as Henry

In addition, Andy Cohen and Kumail Nanjiani have cameo appearances as themselves.

== Production ==
In April 2021, an English-version adaptation of the Norwegian film The Trip was officially in development, with the original's director and co-writer, Tommy Wirkola, attached as director.

By November 2024, Wirkola was no longer directing the film, with Jorma Taccone serving as the director, and Nick Kocher and Brian McElhaney writing the screenplay. Samara Weaving, Jason Segel, Timothy Olyphant, Juliette Lewis, Paul Guilfoyle and Keith Jardine joined the cast. Principal photography began on November 19, 2024, in Tampere, Finland. The filming location of the remote cabin was in Siivikkala, Ylöjärvi.

In May 2025, the film was retitled to Over Your Dead Body with Independent Film Company and Amazon Prime Video acquiring U.S. and international distribution rights, respectively.

== Release ==
Over Your Dead Body premiered at the South by Southwest Film & TV Festival on March 14, 2026, and was released in the United States on April 24, 2026. The film released internationally on June 10 that year to Amazon Prime Video.

== Reception ==
=== Box office ===
In the United States and Canada Over Your Dead Body was released along with Fuze and Michael. It was projected to gross around $3 million from 2,000 theaters in its opening weekend.

=== Critical response ===
On the review aggregator website Rotten Tomatoes, 69% of 101 critics' reviews are positive, with an average rating of 6.2/10. The website's consensus reads: "With Hitchcockian flair, inventive gore and electric performances, Over Your Dead Body blends tense thrills and playful twists into a satisfying, if occasionally conventional ride." Metacritic, which uses a weighted average, assigned the film a score of 51 out of 100, based on 17 critics, indicating "mixed or average" reviews.
