= Tomas Evjen =

Norwegian film creator (1972–2012)

- Died: 11 September 2012

Tomas Evjen (10 October 1972 – 11 September 2012) was a Norwegian editor, media personality and film producer.

== Biography ==
He appeared in Radio Saltdal when he was 12 years old and later worked as a journalist in Nordlandsposten. In 1996, he became editor and general manager of Saltenposten until 2000. He also worked as a reporter for Se og Hør. In 2001, he founded his own media and film company "News On Request AS" in Saltdal Municipality which he later moved to Bodø. The company won the Sparebanken Nord-Norges industry award in 2005. He also became the general manager of Mediegården in Bodø.

He produced a number of films and shorts including Dead Snow in 2009 and the documentary Pappa kom hem in 2010. At the time of his death, he was producing a film with Norwegian director Nils Gaup about the miners' rebellion in Sulis. Dead Snow was nominated for Amanda award becoming a best-selling Norwegian films abroad.

== Death ==
He died on 11 September 2012 and his body was discovered in the Mediegården in Bodø.

== Filmography ==
=== Director ===
- 2009: Near the Mountains

=== Producer ===
- 2009: Dead Snow
- 2010: Pappa kom hem (documentary)

Shorts

- 2007: Burgled
- 2007: Fluen
- 2009: Near the Mountains (co-producer)
- 2011: Skallamann (producer / executive producer)
- 2011: I enden av tauet (executive producer)

=== Cinematographer ===
- 2002: Montagna con forza
- 2009: Near the Mountains (short)
- 2010: Pappa kom hem (documentary)
- 2011: I enden av tauet (short)
