= Euforia Film =

Norwegian film distributor and marketer

Euforia Film is a Norwegian film distributor and marketer.

It was founded in 2007, and by 2010 it was the largest distributor of Norwegian films. Among its distributed films are Dead Snow, Rovdyr and Tomme tønner. It has also distributed non-Norwegian films in Norway, such as Tropa de Elite, Rambo and Superhero Movie.
