= Kill Buljo =

2007 Norwegian comedy film

- Theatrical release poster
- Directed by: Tommy Wirkola
- Written by: Stig Frode Henriksen; Tommy Wirkola
- Produced by: Terje Strømstad
- Starring: Stig Frode Henriksen; Natasha Angel Dahle; Tommy Wirkola; Linda Øverli Nilsen; Martin Hykkerud; Frank Arne Olsen
- Cinematography: Odd Helge Haugsnes; Matt Weston
- Edited by: Tommy Wirkola
- Music by: Kjell Rune Myrland; Petter Carlsen
- Distributed by: Oro Film
- Release date: 23 March 2007
- Running time: 93 minutes
- Country: Norway
- Languages: Norwegian; Northern Sami
- Budget: NOK 890,000
- Box office: $1 million

Kill Buljo is a 2007 Norwegian black comedy film directed by Tommy Wirkola. It parodies the 2003 Quentin Tarantino film Kill Bill. It is set in Finnmark, Norway and portrays the protagonist Jompa Tormann's hunt for Tampa and Papa Buljo. The film depends heavily on satirizing stereotypes about Norway's Sami population.

According to the Norwegian newspaper Dagbladet, Tarantino watched the film's trailer and was quite happy about it, looking forward to seeing the film itself.

A sequel, Kill Buljo 2, was released on 20 December 2013.

== Plot ==
Jompa Tormann is reluctantly on his way into marriage. The bride's family is gathered at the traditional engagement coffee at the Kautokeino community centre when the Deadly Sapmi Assassination Squad, consisting of Tampa Buljo, Crazy Beibifeit, Dr. Kjell Driver and Bud Light assault the premises, draw guns, and fire on anything that moves. Nobody is supposed to leave the centre alive, but Jompa miraculously survives and falls into a deep coma.

The Sami- and woman-hating police inspector Sid Wisløff is assigned to the case together with his assistant Unni Formen. Wisløff is confident that Jompa Tormann killed all his guests, finishing the act by shooting his own head four times to look innocent.

A few weeks later, Jompa awakens, and begins to seek revenge. He has a Katana forged for him by the legendary Bladesmith, Fugioshi Shinaga and sets out. He tracks down the members of The Deadly Sapmi Assassination Squad and settles his business with them one by one. Sid Wisløff and Unni Formen, aided by the Sami pathfinder Peggy Mathilassi, are on his heels to put him behind bars.

== Production ==
The film was shot for 890,000 NOK, or US$106,000.

== Reception ==
The reception was mixed, with NRK P3 giving it 3/6 stars.

== Home video ==
The film sold over 95,000 copies on home video.
