= Jonathan Eusebio =

Filipino American director, stunt coordinator and actor

- Born: Jonathan Raymond Eusebio; September 15, 1973 (age 53); Canada
- Other name: Jojo
- Education: University of California, Irvine (BS)
- Occupations: Film director; assistant director; stunt coordinatorr; actor; fight coordinator; stunt performer
- Years active: 1997–present
- Known for: 300; John Wick; The Fall Guy

Jonathan Raymond Eusebio is an American director, stunt coordinator and an actor. He is considered a prolific figure in Hollywood and the action film genre.

== Personal life ==
Jonathan Raymond Eusebio, also known as Jojo, was born on September 15, 1973, and raised in Canada by his Filipino parents.

Eusebio's interest in martial arts began at the age of eight and progressed through taekwondo, judo, wrestling, and kickboxing, and even after he enrolled in Dan Inosanto's Academy of Martial Arts school, he never realized martial arts would be his calling.

Eusebio's academic path led him to major in Biological Sciences at the University of California, Irvine. After graduating, he worked in a laboratory while maintaining his passion for martial arts. Eusebio began his professional collaboration with future filmmakers and 87eleven Action Design creators Chad Stahelski and David Leitch when he joined at the Inosanto Academy in Marina Del Rey, California, at the age of 18.

== Career ==
Eusebio's first foray into stunt acting was in the 1997 low-budget action movie True Vengeance. By 2002, his contributions to the film Kung Pow: Enter the Fist, led to greater recognition. In the same year, Eusebio contributed to the development of Jason Bourne's distinct fighting technique in The Bourne Identity, which was based on the Filipino martial art Kali and knife combat. As this style persisted throughout the Bourne film series, Eusebio served as a fight coordinator and trained Matt Damon for the role.

Eusebio, a founding member of the 87eleven Action Design, has had a significant impact on the development of the Hollywood stunt collective. His co-fight choreography for Ninja Assassin in 2009 and his work on the ground-breaking movie 300 in 2006 demonstrated 87eleven's growing creative influence.

Eusebio's resume also includes work in Marvel movies, in which he combined Aikido, kali, Muay Thai, and "Lucha libre" to create a distinctive combat style for the character Black Widow in Iron Man 2. His work on several Marvel movies, such as The Avengers, Doctor Strange, and the critically acclaimed Black Panther, was made possible by this role.

Eusebio's contributions to the John Wick franchise are notable examples of his inventiveness. The movies pay homage to Asian action films by combining judo and jiu jitsu, which required Keanu Reeves, the principal actor, to undergo intensive training. The franchise was known to push the edge in terms of Eusebio's creative fighting styles and stunt work.

Eusebio's participation in the industry increased further beginning in 2017 when he began working as a second unit director on various 87eleven movies, including Deadpool 2, Birds of Prey, and Kate. In 2022, he took up the roles of second unit director and stunt coordinator on the Star Wars series, Obi-Wan Kenobi, and in 2021, on the fourth Matrix film, ''The Matrix Resurrections''.

== Filmography ==
Director
Year	Title		Refs.
2018	Deadpool 2	Second unit director	
2020	Birds of Prey	Second unit director	
2021	Kate	Second unit director	
2022	Violent Night	Second unit director	
2025	Love Hurts	Director	

Stuntwork
Year	Title	Refs.
2002	Kung Pow! Enter the Fist	
2002	Blade II	
2002	Austin Powers in Goldmember	
2003	The League of Extraordinary Gentlemen	
2004	Max Havoc: Curse Of The Dragon	
2005	Serenity	
2005	Feast	
2006	Idiocracy	
2006	300	
2007	Fetch	
2007	Pirates of the Caribbean: At World's End	
2008	Never Back Down	
2009	Dragonball Evolution	
2010	Iron Man 2	
2010	The Twilight Saga: Eclipse	
2010	The Expandables	
2011	Conan the Barbarian	
2011	Haywire	
2012	The Avengers	
2013	The Wolverine	
2013	Escape Plan	
2014	The Teenage Mutant Ninja Turtles	
2014	John Wick	
2015	Hitman: Agent 47	
2015	The Last Witch Hunter	
2016	Teenage Mutant Ninja Turtles: Out of the Shadows	
2016	Doctor Strange	
2017	John Wick: Chapter 2	
2018	Black Panther	
2018	Deadpool 2	
2019	John Wick: Chapter 3 – Parrabellum	
2020	Birds of Prey (and the Fantabulous Emancipation of One Harley Quinn)	
2021	Kate	
2021	The Matrix Resurrections	
2022	Obi-Wan Kenobi	
2022	Violent Night	
2024	The Fall Guy	

Actor
Year	Title	Role	Refs.
2002	Kung Pow! Enter the Fist	Gang Fighter #5	
2002	The Time Machine	Eloi	
2007	Shooter	K-9 Cop #2	
2008	Never Back Down	Dak Ho	
2012	The Bourne Legacy	Guard	
2015	Don't F*#% with John Wick	Himself	
2022	Obi-Wan Kenobi: A Jedi's Return	Himself/Stunt coordinator	

== Accolades ==
Award	Year	Category	Recipient(s)	Result	Ref.
San Diego Film Critics Society Awards	2024	Best Stunt Choreography	The Fall Guy	Won	
Minnesota Film Critics Alliance Awards	2025	Best Stunt Choreography	The Fall Guy	Nominated	
Screen Actors Guild Award	2022	Outstanding Action Performance by a Stunt Ensemble in a Motion Picture	The Matrix Resurrections	Nominated	
Screen Actors Guild Award	2019	Outstanding Action Performance by a Stunt Ensemble in a Motion Picture	Black Panther	Won	
Screen Actors Guild Award	2017	Outstanding Action Performance by a Stunt Ensemble in a Motion Picture	Doctor Strange	Nominated	
Screen Actors Guild Award	2014	Outstanding Action Performance by a Stunt Ensemble in a Motion Picture	The Wolverine	Nominated	
Screen Actors Guild Award	2013	Outstanding Action Performance by a Stunt Ensemble in a Motion Picture	The Bourne Legacy	Nominated	
Screen Actors Guild Award	2008	Outstanding Action Performance by a Stunt Ensemble in a Motion Picture	The Bourne Ultimatum	Won	
Screen Actors Guild Award	2008	Outstanding Action Performance by a Stunt Ensemble in a Motion Picture	Pirates of the Caribbean: At World's End	Nominated	
Screen Actors Guild Award	2008	Outstanding Action Performance by a Stunt Ensemble in a Motion Picture	300	Nominated	
Online Film & Television Association	2025	Best Stunt Coordination	The Fall Guy	Won	
Online Film & Television Association	2020	Best Stunt Coordination	John Wick: Chapter 3 – Parrabellum	Won	
Online Film & Television Association	2019	Best Stunt Coordination	Black Panther	Nominated	
Online Film & Television Association	2019	Best Stunt Coordination	Deadpool 2	Nominated	
Taurus World Stunt Awards	2015	Best Fight	John Wick	Won	
Taurus World Stunt Awards	2010	Best Fight	Ninja Assassin	Won	
Taurus World Stunt Awards	2008	Best Fight	300	Won	
Austin Film Critics Association	2025	Best Stunt Work	The Fall Guy	Won	
Oklahoma Film Critics Circle Awards	2025	Best Stunt	The Fall Guy	Won	
Houston Film Critics Society Awards	2025	Best Stunt Coordination	The Fall Guy	Won	
Awards Circuit Community Awards	2019	Best Stunt Ensemble	Black Panther	Nominated	
Awards Circuit Community Awards	2019	Best Stunt Ensemble	Deadpool 2	Nominated	
North Carolina Film Critics Association	2025	Best Stunt Coordination	The Fall Guy	Nominated	
Hawaii Film Critics Society	2025	Best Stunt Work	The Fall Guy	Won	
Music City Film Critics' Association Awards	2025	Best Stunt Work	The Fall Guy	Won	
Latino Entertainment Journalists Association Film Awards	2025	Best Stunts	The Fall Guy	Won	
Online Association of Female Film Critics	2025	Best Stunts	The Fall Guy	Nominated	
DiscussingFilm Critic Awards	2025	Best Stunt Ensemble	The Fall Guy	Nominated	
Seattle Film Critics Society	2025	Best Stunt Choreography	The Fall Guy	Nominated	
Portland Critics Association Awards	2025	Best Stunt/Best Action Choreography	The Fall Guy	Nominated	
Critics Association of Central Florida Awards	2025	Best Stunt Coordination	The Fall Guy	Won	
