= Manhunt (2008 film) =

- International film poster
- Directed by: Patrik Syversen
- Written by: Nini Bull Robsahm; Patrik Syversen
- Produced by: Knud Bjørne-Larsen; Torleif Hauge
- Starring: Kristina Leganger Aaserud; Janne Beate Bønes; Henriette Bruusgaard; Jørn Bjørn Fuller Gee
- Cinematography: Håvard Andre Byrkjeland
- Edited by: Veslemøy B. Langvik
- Music by: Simon Boswell
- Production company: Fender Film
- Distributed by: Euforia Film (Norway)
- Release date: 2008
- Running time: 75 minutes
- Country: Norway
- Language: Norwegian
- Box office: $1.1 million

Manhunt (Norwegian: Rovdyr) is a 2008 Norwegian horror film directed by Patrik Syversen.

== Synopsis ==
The story is set in 1974. Four friends—Camilla, Roger, Mia and Jørgen—go for a vacation in a forest. They stop at an inn and meet people and a girl who joins their group. Their newfound friend takes them on a journey to the deep end of the forest, where they become systematically hunted and killed for sport by a party of locals. The friends try to escape while avoiding a series of traps the trackers left on the place.

== Cast ==
- Henriette Bruusgaard as Camilla
- Jørn Bjørn Fuller Gee as Jørgen
- Lasse Valdal as Roger
- Nini Bull Robsahm as Mia
- Janne Beate Bønes as Renate
- Trym Hagen as Gutt i tre (as Trym E. Hagen)
- Kristina Leganger Aaserud as Jenta
- Helge Sveen as Jeger 1
- Jeppe Beck Laursen as Jeger 2
- Erlend Vetleseter as Jeger 3
- Jorunn Kjellsby as Kafédame
- Martin Slaatto as Mann 1
- Kristofer Hivju as Mann 2
- Gudmund Groven as Mann 3

== Reception ==
The film had mixed reviews, with a "die throw" of 3 out of 6 in both Verdens Gang and Dagbladet, and 4 given in Nettavisen and Dagsavisen. ABC Nyheter had a different grading system, giving it 5 out of 10.

== Soundtrack ==
The opening track "Wait For The Rain", which is sung and was written by David Hess, is the original score song of The Last House on the Left, which also starred Hess. The end theme "En Spennende Dag For Josefine" is a Norwegian folkloric pop song sung by Inger Lise Rypdal.
