= The Trip (2021 film) =

Norwegian action comedy film

- Theatrical release poster
- Norwegian: I onde dager
- Directed by: Tommy Wirkola
- Written by: Tommy Wirkola; John Niven; Nick Ball
- Starring: Aksel Hennie; Noomi Rapace
- Cinematography: Matthew Weston
- Edited by: Patrick Larsgaard
- Production company: XYZ Films
- Distributed by: SF Norge
- Release date: 30 July 2021
- Running time: 113 minutes
- Country: Norway
- Language: Norwegian

The Trip (Norwegian: I onde dager lit. 'In evil days' or 'In bad days') (Note: In Norwegian wedding vows, couples affirm that they will stay together in "gode og onde dager" (good and bad days) though the word "ond" can mean "evil" or "bad".) is a 2021 Norwegian action horror comedy film starring Aksel Hennie and Noomi Rapace. Hennie and Rapace portray Lars and Lisa, a couple who are fed up with each other and plan on murdering each other during their trip to their "hytte" (cottage; or fritidsbolig, vacation house). However, their plans go awry when three fugitives take them captive.

The film was directed by Tommy Wirkola, who co-wrote it with Nick Ball and John Niven. It premiered on 30 July 2021 in Norway and appeared in the Fantastic Fest 2021 lineup in September the same year. It was internationally released on 15 October 2021 and is available for streaming on Netflix.

== Plot ==
Lars is a dissatisfied soap opera director and his Swedish wife, Lisa, is an actress who can't make it. Having left for a weekend to go on a cabin trip, both plan to murder each other. Viktor, a friend of Lars, wants to help him carry out his murderous intentions in exchange for a share of Lisa's life insurance.

As Lars attacks Lisa with a hammer, she tasers him, leaving him temporarily immobilised. But after having tied Lars up, the naïve Viktor arrives and turns the situation around in Lars' favour. When Lisa reveals that she can offer Viktor more money than Lars, a fight ensues in which Lars seriously injures Viktor. Begged by his wife to do something, Lars misunderstands and shoots Viktor with a gun, killing him. In the fight that follows, the gun goes off, with the shot passing through the ceiling and hitting a man hiding in the attic. One by one, three men fall down as the ceiling collapses.

They are Petter, Dave and Roy, three fugitives on the run. The trio had taken refuge in the cabin before Lars and Lisa arrived, but had to hide once the couple appeared.

Dave apparently plans to rape Lisa, which Lars makes fun of. It is then revealed that he was actually planning to take Lars. Faced with this, Lisa begs the three not to hurt him or her, promising to pay them a large sum of money the next day. Eventually, the couple break free and attempt to escape. This is followed by a series of brutal clashes, in which the two would have died if not for Mikkel, Lars' father who owns the cabin. Mikkel had been warned by his friend, Hans, about strange events in his cabin, leading to Mikkel's escape from his care home to check what was going on.

Mikkel, Dave and Roy are all killed in a violent fight, leaving Petter with an apparent upper hand against Lars and Lisa. They overpower him and sink his body in a nearby lake, drowning him.

Upon arrival of the police, the couple, united by reignited feelings, share a self-flattering version of events, presenting themselves as brave and heroic. They ride the popularity of their story by producing a Hollywood film, with Lars as its director and Lisa starring as herself.

== Cast ==
=== Main ===
- Aksel Hennie as Lars, a film director who is married to Lisa
- Noomi Rapace as Lisa, an aspiring actress who is married to Lars
- Atle Antonsen as Petter, a serial killer
- Christian Rubeck as Dave, a serial killer
- André Eriksen as Roy, a serial killer

=== Others ===
- Nils Ole Oftebro as Mikkel, the father of Lars
- Stig Frode Henriksen as Viktor, a friend of Lars
- Selome Emnetu as Ida, a friend of Lisa
- Harald Dal as Kjetil, an actor playing a role in Lars' film
- Evy Kasseth Røsten as Charlotte, an actress playing a role in Lars' film
- Tor Erik Gunstrøm as Hans, a friend of Mikkel
- Galvan Mehidi as Abio, an employee at the care home
- Ask Sørsdahl as himself
- Jeppe Beck Laursen as himself
- Kristoffer Jørgensen as himself
- Jonas Hoff Oftebro as himself
- Fredrik Skavlan as himself
- Sturla Dyregrov as himself

== Reception ==
On the review aggregator website Rotten Tomatoes, 83% of 12 critics' reviews are positive.

Sigurd Vik writes in Filmpolitiet that "in good Tarantino-style, well-known Norwegian songs, including riff-strong Møkkamann (Dumdum Boys) and cool Fru Johnsen, (Note: Originally an American country song written by Tom T. Hall, "Harper Valley PTA" was translated by Terje Mosnes into Norwegian as "Fru Johnsen" (lit. 'Mrs. Johnsen'). A recording by Inger Lise Rypdal was released in 1968.) are used to give impact, added value and style points to several sequences". He also notes that "the surprises come close, the flesh wounds come even closer and there is a wild and wonderful energy in many of the scenes that drive the action forward". He says it "is definitely not a movie for everyone, but it's perfect for those who know they love Tommy Wirkola's films". NRK critic Birger Vestmo notes that "funny and physically demanding roles from well-known actors, such as Aksel Hennie, Noomi Rapace og Atle Antonsen", contributed to the film's success.

Trace Thurman, writing for Bloody Disgusting, describes it as a much bloodier The War of the Roses. Thurman criticizes the film's "unnecessarily episodic quality", suggesting that "what the film could have used is a swifter hand in the editing room," and he praised Hennie and Rapace's performances as "simply delightful in their roles as the bickering protagonists". Thurman also expresses that it is "unfortunate that Netflix" is not "promoting The Trip at all" as it has the potential of being an "ultimate crowd-pleaser".

Lena Wilson writes in The New York Times that "while that concept promises a fun, agile thriller", the film "descends into a juvenile, nihilistic mess". Wilson criticises the "tasteless material about genitals and poop", describing "its basic premise" as "much smarter". Wilson concludes that it is "occasionally fun, but other films have handled gleeful gore and psychological torture with a far more skillful touch" and compares it to Funny Games, stating that "it doesn't do itself any favors by inviting that comparison".

James Croot, writing for Stuff, compares the film to Funny Games, expressing that one "could be forgiven for thinking" they were watching a "Scandinavian remake of Michael Haneke's Funny Games". Croot describes the film as "occasionally hilarious, sometimes gruesome, slightly queasy, but certainly inventive cinema". He expresses that it has a "slightly off-balance" delivery, leaving you not "feeling like it is a fully enjoyable experience".

Jude Dry of IndieWire, calls it "devilishly fun", with its genre sitting between "thriller, horror, and comedy". She writes that the film is "cheeky and inventive" with "brilliant performances" and "a whipsmart script". Dry expresses that "the violence reaches wildly gratuitous levels without ever feeling like overkill". She describes the plot as "outlandish, revealing the film's full-on tongue-in-cheekiness".

== Accolades ==
Award ceremony	Year	Category	Nominee	Result	Ref.
Amanda Award	2022	Best Make-up (Note: For this category, production staff are nominated.)	Lois McIntosh; Maria Zahl	Nominated	
Amanda Award	2022	People's Amanda (Note: The winner is chosen through a vote by the public.)	The Trip	Nominated	

== Remake ==
An American remake of The Trip titled Over Your Dead Body, directed by Jorma Taccone and starring Jason Segel, Samara Weaving and Timothy Olyphant, was theatrically released in March 2026.
