= Love Hurts (2025 film) =

Film by Jonathan Eusebio

- Theatrical release poster
- Directed by: Jonathan Eusebio
- Written by: Matthew Murray; Josh Stoddard; Luke Passmore
- Produced by: Kelly McCormick; David Leitch; Guy Danella
- Starring: Ke Huy Quan; Ariana DeBose; Daniel Wu; Mustafa Shakir; Lio Tipton; Cam Gigandet; Marshawn Lynch; Sean Astin
- Cinematography: Bridger Nielson
- Edited by: Elísabet Ronaldsdóttir
- Music by: Dominic Lewis
- Production company: 87North Productions
- Distributed by: Universal Pictures
- Release date: February 7, 2025
- Running time: 83 minutes
- Country: United States
- Language: English
- Budget: $18 million
- Box office: $17.6 million

Love Hurts is a 2025 American action comedy film directed by Jonathan Eusebio, in his directorial debut, and written by Matthew Murray, Josh Stoddard, and Luke Passmore. The film stars Ke Huy Quan, Ariana DeBose, Daniel Wu, Mustafa Shakir, Lio Tipton, Cam Gigandet, Marshawn Lynch, and Sean Astin. Its plot follows a former hitman-turned-realtor who learns that his brother is hunting him when he reunites with his former partner.

The film was released in the United States on February 7, 2025, by Universal Pictures. It received generally negative reviews from critics and earned $17.6 million worldwide on the budget of $18 million.

== Plot ==
Marvin Gable is a successful real estate agent who has recently been awarded the highest honor by his boss, friend, and mentor Cliff Cussick. He is often accompanied by his cynically depressed assistant Ashley, who constantly threatens leaving her job, despite Marvin's pep talks.

In actuality, Marvin is a former assassin for "The Company", run by his estranged brother Alvin, AKA "Knuckles". He was to eliminate a young lawyer, Rose, after she stole from the company, but due to his love for her, he told her to run instead before choosing to leave his old life behind.

In the present, around Valentine's Day, Marvin receives a letter from Rose. He is later confronted by knife assassin and poetry obsessed Raven, who has been hired to find the whereabouts of Rose. Marvin knocks Raven out and leaves him in his office. He heads back home to collect his things before two more agents, King and Otis, confront him.

Marvin manages to defeat the two before he is captured by Rose, who takes him back to her hideout at a strip club. Meanwhile, Ashley discovers Raven as well as his poetry and falls in love with him, where he in turn admires her appreciation for his work.

Cliff goes to Marvin's house where he is confronted by Knuckles, who tells him of Marvin's former life. Despite this, Cliff respects Marvin's efforts to change and Knuckles kills him when he declares that they are "brothers".

Rose tells Marvin she has collected an insurmountable degree of information of Knuckles' frequent money laundering, revealing that he has been cheating several partners, and has even captured his accountant, Kippy Betts. She had also been coercing Knuckles' right-hand man Renny Merlo, who was going to double cross her for fear of Knuckles finding out that he had stolen from him. Rose plans to use Kippy's information to finally take down Knuckles, and wants Marvin to return to his old ways to help her out.

Having hid in one of the houses Marvin is selling, a couple that Marvin previously spoke to arrive, forcing him to finalize his work with them. He contacts Ashley and asks that she bring the papers, unaware that Raven is with her. Kippy manages to escape and contacts Renny, who in turn orders King and Otis to come as well.

As Rose leaves to confront Knuckles, Raven, Ashley, Otis, and King arrive and a fight breaks out, resulting in the death of Marvin's overzealous rival Jeff Zaks. Marvin and Raven team up and take out Otis and King, but Ashley insists that Marvin and Raven cease their fight as she is in love with the latter. Inspired by this, Marvin pursues Rose to Knuckles' hideout and they fight through his men, with Merlo getting killed.

After realizing his brother murdered Cliff, Marvin has one final fight with Knuckles, ending with him victorious. Rose reveals that she contacted the Russian gangsters that Knuckles had cheated, resulting in them coming and taking him away. Marvin finally declares his love for Rose, proudly embracing his past and future.

== Cast ==
- Ke Huy Quan as Marvin Gable, a former hitman-turned-successful realtor
- Ariana DeBose as Rose Carlisle, a lawyer and Marvin's girlfriend
- Daniel Wu as Alvin "Knuckles" Gable, Marvin's estranged younger brother
- Marshawn Lynch as King
- Mustafa Shakir as The Raven / Roger
- Lio Tipton as Ashley
- Rhys Darby as Kippy Betts
- André Eriksen as Otis
- Sean Astin as Cliff Cussick, Marvin's realty mentor
- Cam Gigandet as Renny Merlo
- Drew Scott as Jeff Zaks

== Production ==
In January 2024, it was reported that an action film titled With Love directed by Jonathan Eusebio was in development, with Luke Passmore, Josh Stoddard, and Matthew Murray writing the screenplay and Ke Huy Quan cast in the lead role. In March, Ariana DeBose joined the cast in an undisclosed role. In April, Daniel Wu, Marshawn Lynch, Mustafa Shakir, Cam Gigandet, André Eriksen, and Lio Tipton joined the cast of the film. Principal photography began on April 1, in Winnipeg, Manitoba, and wrapped on May 17, 2024. The production budget was $18 million. The film was retitled from With Love to Love Hurts by October 2024 and Sean Astin was revealed to have joined the cast.

== Release ==
Love Hurts was released in the United States on February 7, 2025, by Universal Pictures.

== Reception ==
=== Box office ===
As of March 18, 2025, Love Hurts has grossed $15.7 million in the United States and Canada, and $1.9 million in other territories, for a worldwide gross of $17.6 million.

In the United States and Canada, Love Hurts was released alongside Heart Eyes and was projected to gross $7–8 million from 3,055 theaters in its opening weekend. The film earned $2.6 million on its first day, including an estimated $850,000 from Thursday night previews. It debuted to $5.8 million, finishing third behind holdover Dog Man and Heart Eyes. It made $4.2 million in its second weekend, finishing in sixth, and dropped out of the box office top ten in its fourth weekend. It ended its theatrical run after 39 days (five weeks).

=== Critical response ===
On the review aggregator website Rotten Tomatoes, 18% of 176 critics' reviews are positive. The website's consensus reads: "Ouchie." Metacritic, which uses a weighted average, assigned the film a score of 34 out of 100, based on 43 critics, indicating "generally unfavorable" reviews. Audiences polled by CinemaScore gave the film an average grade of "C+" on an A+ to F scale, while those surveyed by PostTrak gave it a 61% overall positive score, with 41% saying they would "definitely recommend" it.

Robert Daniels of RogerEbert.com gave the film one out of four stars and wrote, "Love Hurts is plagued by commitment issues. The romantic action comedy wants to be a throwback exploitation programmer with a modern sheen but isn't invested in the romance, action, or even the comedy it's trying to sell."

Richard Roeper of the Chicago Sun-Times gave it one and a half out of four stars, writing, "It's as if they took various ingredients from the Quentin Tarantino catalog, mixed in a medley of fights from the Bourne franchise (only without any real sense of menace), sprinkled in some lame attempts at dark humor, tossed 'em into a malfunctioning AI Blender and hit 'Puree.' With the lid off." Robbie Collin of The Daily Telegraph earned a two out of five rating, stating that "Love Hurts's handling of this fairly straightforward narrative template makes Mulholland Drive look an episode of Paw Patrol: on numerous occasions while watching I found myself wondering if I'd just woken up, or was possibly having a stroke."

Ben Kenigsberg of The New York Times quipped that "the emphasis is on hurt, not love." He praised the movie's action scenes, but felt that the plot and character interactions were dull and barren.

=== Accolades ===
Accolades received by Love Hurts
Award	Date of ceremony	Category	Recipient(s)	Result	Ref.
Golden Raspberry Awards	March 14, 2026	Worst Actress	Ariana DeBose	Nominated	
