= David Harbour =

American actor (born 1975)

- Harbour in 2025
- Born: David Kenneth Harbour; April 10, 1975 (age 51); White Plains, New York, U.S.
- Education: Dartmouth College (BA)
- Occupation: Actor
- Years active: 1994–present
- Spouse: Lily Allen (m. 2020; sep. 2025)

David Kenneth Harbour (born April 10, 1975) is an American actor. He gained global recognition for his portrayal of Jim Hopper in the Netflix science fiction series Stranger Things (2016–2025), for which he received two nominations for the Primetime Emmy Award for Outstanding Supporting Actor in a Drama Series. His starring film roles include the title character in Hellboy (2019), Santa Claus in Violent Night (2022), and a former racer in the sports film Gran Turismo (2023). Harbour has played Red Guardian in the Marvel Cinematic Universe, including the films Black Widow (2021) and Thunderbolts* (2025). Harbour also voiced Eric Frankenstein in the animated television series Creature Commandos (2024–present). He won a Primetime Emmy Award for Outstanding Supporting Actor in a Limited or Anthology Series or Movie for his role in DTF St. Louis (2026).

== Early life and education ==
Harbour was born in White Plains, New York, to Kenneth and Nancy (née Riley) Harbour, both of whom work in real estate—his mother in residential and his father in commercial. He attended Byram Hills High School in Armonk, New York, along with actors Sean Maher and Eyal Podell. He graduated from Dartmouth College in Hanover, New Hampshire, in 1997, where he majored in drama and Italian and was a member of the Sigma Phi Epsilon fraternity.

As a young man in New York City, Harbour participated in gambling at underground poker clubs and attests that he personally knew the gangster who was the basis for John Malkovich's character "Teddy KGB" in the 1998 film Rounders.

== Career ==
=== 1994–2013: Early years ===
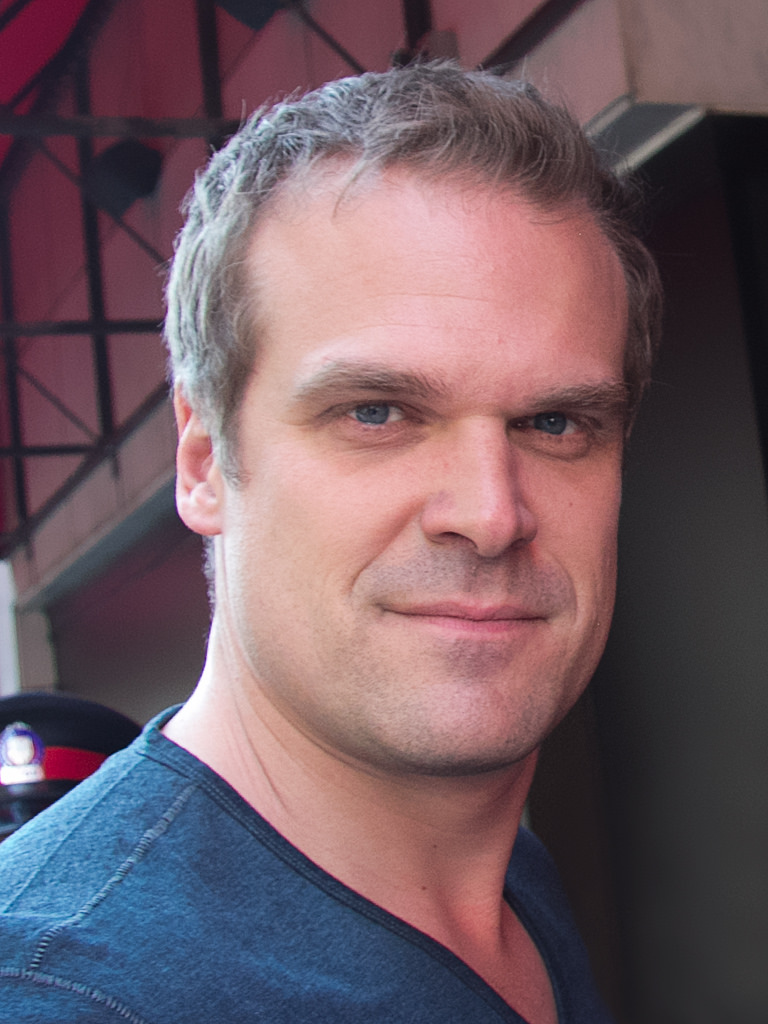
Harbour at the 2014 Toronto International Film Festival

From 1994 to 1997, Harbour performed with The Theater at Monmouth at Cumston Hall in Monmouth, Maine, where he acted in Shakespearian productions such as The Tempest, Much Ado About Nothing, The Winter's Tale, and Hamlet. Harbour began acting professionally on Broadway in 1999, in the revival of The Rainmaker. He made his television debut that year on the television show Law & Order, playing a waiter. He appeared again in 2002 in an episode of Law & Order: Special Victims Unit, playing a child murderer. He had the recurring role of MI6 agent Roger Anderson in the ABC series Pan Am. In 2005, he was nominated for a Tony Award for his performance as Nick in the revival of Who's Afraid of Virginia Woolf?.

Harbour is also known for his role as CIA Agent Gregg Beam in Quantum of Solace, as Shep Campbell in Revolutionary Road, and as Russell Crowe's source in State of Play. He also received praise for his role as spree killer Paul Devildis in a 2009 episode of Law & Order: Criminal Intent. His other film credits include Brokeback Mountain, The Green Hornet, End of Watch, and Between Us. In 2013, he had a small role of a head doctor in the television series Elementary. From 2012 to 2014, he also had the recurring role of Elliot Hirsch in The Newsroom.

=== 2014–present: Breakthrough and success with Stranger Things ===
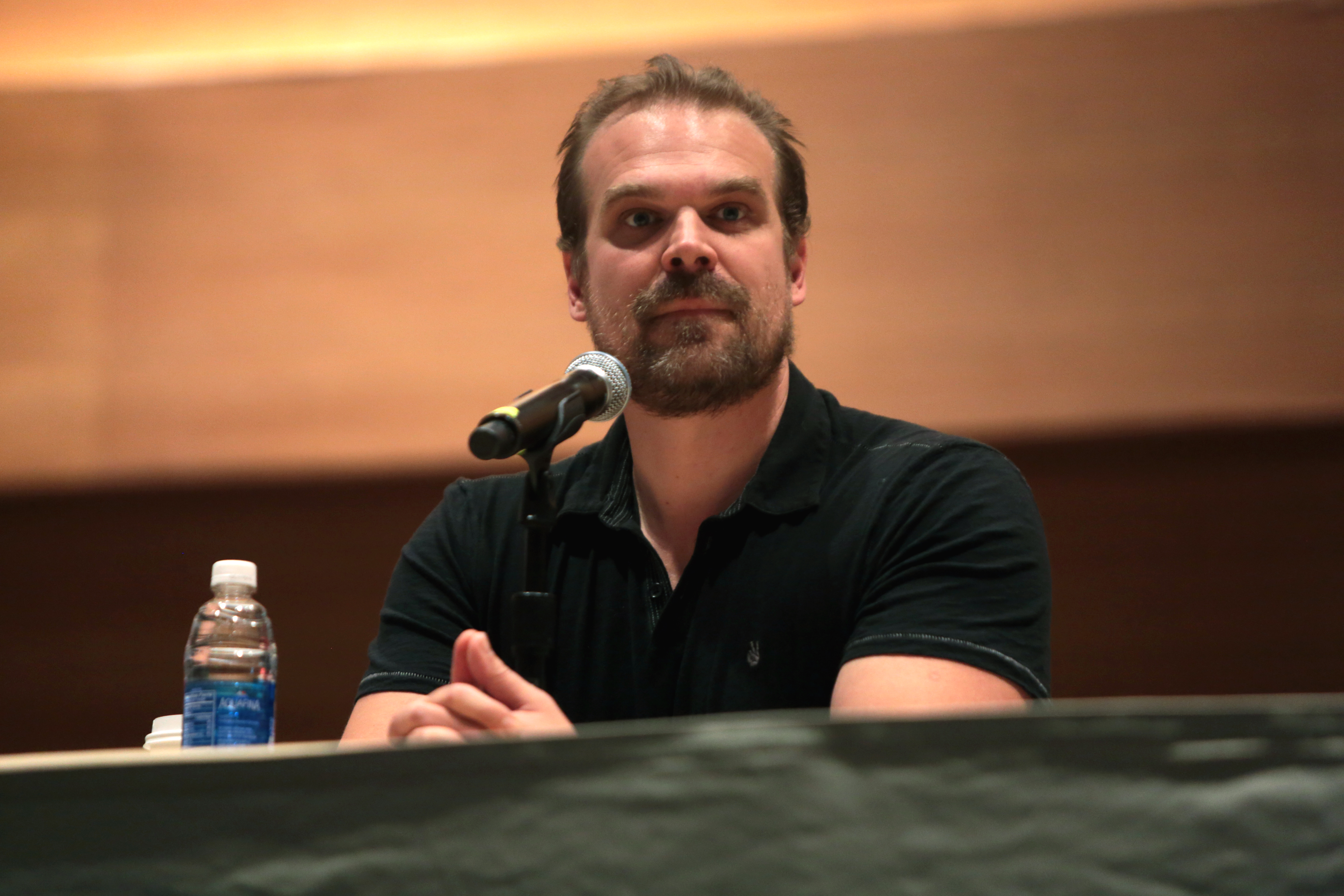
Harbour in 2016

In 2014, Harbour played the recurring character of Dr. Reed Akley in the first season of the historical drama series Manhattan. In 2015, he was cast as Chief Jim Hopper in the Netflix science fiction horror series Stranger Things. For that role, he has received nominations for the Primetime Emmy Award for Outstanding Supporting Actor in a Drama Series (2017 and 2018) and the Golden Globe Award for Best Supporting Actor – Series, Miniseries or Television Film (2018). He won an Actor Award for Outstanding Performance by an Ensemble in a Drama Series (2017) along with the rest of the cast.

Harbour starred as the title character in the superhero reboot film Hellboy (2019). He portrayed Alexei Shostakov / Red Guardian in the Marvel Cinematic Universe (MCU) film Black Widow (2021), and reprised the role in Thunderbolts* (2025). He also had starring roles in Christmas action comedy film Violent Night (2022), and in the Neill Blomkamp sports film Gran Turismo (2023) based on the PlayStation video game series of the same name.

== Personal life ==
Harbour had relationships with Alison Sudol and Julia Stiles. Starting in 2019, he was in a relationship with English singer-songwriter Lily Allen. They made their red carpet debut during the 26th annual Screen Actors Guild Awards. They married on September 7, 2020, in Las Vegas in a wedding officiated by an Elvis impersonator. The couple shared a Brownstone house in Carroll Gardens, Brooklyn and worked with the architect Ben Bischoff. He currently resides in West Village, Manhattan.

In December 2024, The Telegraph alleged that Allen and Harbour had separated, after Allen's dating profile was reportedly spotted on the exclusive dating app Raya. Other reports state that the couple had separated in early 2025. After the release of Allen's fifth studio album West End Girl, she stated that it was partially based on the "demise" of their relationship and Harbour's alleged infidelity.

In an interview with The Guardian on his role in Black Widow in July 2021, Harbour said he was a socialist: "I don't know that there's anyone who could disagree with socialist ideology". He elaborated: "The idea of a kindergarten-type society where we share things is my ideal society—as opposed to this world where we're hunting and killing and destroying for our own personal hoarding, our own personal greed."

Harbour struggled with alcoholism in his past and has been sober since he was 24, after hitting "rock bottom" as he faced homelessness, loneliness and thoughts of suicide. He began drinking as a teenager and the habit worsened during college. He decided to stop drinking after feeling "very lonely and needing a different direction in my life", and has said, "I enjoy consciousness too much now" to drink again. At age 26, Harbour was diagnosed with bipolar disorder. Harbour enjoys watching Let's Plays and speedruns of old video games. Harbour is a fan of the NHL's New York Rangers. He is a former believer in the paranormal.

== Filmography ==
Key
†	Denotes films that have not yet been released

=== Film ===
Year	Title	Role	Notes
2004	Kinsey	Robert Kinsey	
2005	Confess	FBI Agent McAllister	
2005	Brokeback Mountain	Randall Malone	
2005	War of the Worlds	Dock Worker	Deleted scene
2006	The Wedding Weekend	David	
2007	Awake	Dracula	
2008	Revolutionary Road	Shep Campbell	
2008	Quantum of Solace	Gregg Beam	
2009	State of Play	PointCorp Insider	
2010	Every Day	Brian	
2011	The Green Hornet	D.A. Frank Scanlon	
2011	W.E.	Ernest Simpson	
2011	Thin Ice	Bob Egan	Originally released as The Convincer
2012	End of Watch	Van Hauser	
2012	Between Us	Joel	
2012	Knife Fight	Stephen Green	
2013	Snitch	Jay Price	
2013	Parkland	James Gordon Shanklin	
2014	X/Y	Todd	
2014	A Walk Among the Tombstones	Ray	
2014	The Equalizer	Frank Masters	
2015	Black Mass	John Morris	
2016	Suicide Squad	Dexter Tolliver	
2017	Sleepless	Doug Dennison	
2019	Hellboy	Hellboy	
2019	Frankenstein's Monster's Monster, Frankenstein	David Harbour III / Jr. / Frankenstein	Short film
2020	Extraction	Gaspar	
2020	Turtle Journey	Father Turtle	Short film
2021	No Sudden Move	Matt Wertz	
2021	Black Widow	Alexei Shostakov / Red Guardian	
2022	Violent Night	Nicomund the Red / Santa Claus	
2023	We Have a Ghost	Ernest the Ghost	
2023	Gran Turismo	Jack Salter	
2024	Night of the Zoopocalypse	Dan (voice)	
2025	A Working Man	Gunny Lefferty	
2025	Thunderbolts*	Alexei Shostakov / Red Guardian	
2026	Goat	Archie Everhardt (voice)	
2026	Evil Genius †		Post-production
2026	Violent Night 2 †	Nicomund the Red / Santa Claus	Post-production
2026	Avengers: Doomsday †	Alexei Shostakov / Red Guardian	Post-production
2027	John Rambo †	Colonel Samuel R. "Sam" Trautman	Post-production
TBA	A Head Full of Ghosts †	John Barrett	Post-production
TBA	Little One †		Filming

=== Television ===
Year	Title	Role	Notes	Ref.
1999, 2008	Law & Order	Mike	Episode: "Patsy"	
1999, 2008	Law & Order	Jay Carlin	Episode: "Submission"	
2002	Law & Order: Special Victims Unit	Terry Jessup	Episode: "Dolls"	
2003	Hack	Christopher Clark	Episode: "Presumed Guilty"	
2004, 2009	Law & Order: Criminal Intent	Wesley John Kenderson	Episode: "Silver Lining"	
2004, 2009	Law & Order: Criminal Intent	Paul Devildis	Episode: "Family Values"	
2007	The Unit	Gary Weber	Episode: "Five Brothers"	
2009	Lie to Me	Frank Ambrose	Episode: "The Better Half"	
2009	Royal Pains	Dan Samuels	Episode: "It's Like Jamais Vu All Over Again"	
2011–2012	Pan Am	Roger Anderson	6 episodes	
2012	Midnight Sun	Ethan Davies	Unsold NBC TV pilot	
2012	Blue	Cooper	3 episodes	
2012–2014	The Newsroom	Elliot Hirsch	10 episodes	
2013	Elementary	Dr. Mason Baldwin	Episode: "Lesser Evils"	
2014	Rake	David Potter	11 episodes	
2014	Manhattan	Dr. Reed Akley	10 episodes	
2014–2015	State of Affairs	David Patrick	Main role; 13 episodes	
2015–2016	Banshee	Robert Dalton	2 episodes	
2016	Crisis in Six Scenes	Vic	Episode: "#1.2"	
2016–2025	Stranger Things	Jim Hopper	Main role; 42 episodes	
2018	Drunk History	Vietnam Memorial Head	Episode: "Underdogs"	
2018	Animals	Hawk	Voice, episode: "Roachella"	
2019	El Hormiguero 3.0	Himself (guest)	Episode: "David Harbour"	
2019	Saturday Night Live	Himself (host)	Episode: "David Harbour/Camila Cabello"	
2020	The Simpsons	Fred Kranepool	Voice, episode: "Undercover Burns"	
2021	Big City Greens	Rick	Voice, episode: "The Van"	
2021	Q-Force	Agent Rick Buck	Voice	
2021	Star Wars: Visions	Tajin	Voice, episode: "The Elder"; english dub	
2021	Marvel Studios: Assembled	Himself	Episode: "The Making of Black Widow "	
2024–present	Creature Commandos	Eric Frankenstein	Voice; main role	
2024	What If...?	Alexei Shostakov / Red Guardian	Voice; 2 episodes	
2025	Marvel Zombies	Alexei Shostakov / Red Guardian	Voice; 3 episodes	
2026	DTF St. Louis	Floyd Smernitch	Main role; 7 episodes	

=== Video games ===
Year	Title	Role	Notes	Ref.
2024	Alone in the Dark	Edward Carnby	Voice and likeness	
2026	Mewgenics	Cat voice variant	Voice	
TBA	Total War: Warhammer 40,000	TBA	In production	

== Theater ==
Year	Title	Role	Venue	Notes	Ref.
2000	Stranger	Steward / Frank / Pato	Vineyard Theatre	Off-Broadway	
2001	The Invention of Love	Moses John Jackson	Lyceum Theatre	Broadway	
2002	Twelfth Night	Antonio	Delacorte Theater		
2003	Fifth of July	John Landis	Signature Theatre	Off-Broadway	
2003	A Bad Friend	Fallon	Lincoln Center Theater	Off-Broadway	
2003	The Two Noble Kinsmen	Arcite	The Public Theater	Off-Broadway	
2004	Between Us	Joel	New York City Center	Off-Broadway	
2005	Who's Afraid of Virginia Woolf?	Nick	Wilbur Theatre		
2005	Who's Afraid of Virginia Woolf?	Nick	Longacre Theatre	Broadway	
2006–2007	The Coast of Utopia: Part 1 – Voyage	Nicholas Stankevich	Vivian Beaumont Theater	Broadway	
2006–2007	The Coast of Utopia: Part 2 – Shipwreck	George Herwegh	Vivian Beaumont Theater	Broadway	
2006–2007	The Coast of Utopia: Part 3 – Salvage	Doctor Bazarov	Vivian Beaumont Theater	Broadway	
2008	Hamlet	Laertes / Ghost of Hamlet's Father	Delacorte Theater		
2009	Time Stands Still	James Dodd	Geffen Playhouse		
2010–2011	The Merchant of Venice	Bassanio	Broadhurst Theatre	Broadway	
2012–2013	Glengarry Glen Ross	John Williamson	Gerald Schoenfeld Theatre	Broadway	
2016	Cal in Camo	Tim	Rattlestick Playwrights Theater	Off-Broadway	
2022	Mad House	Michael	Ambassadors Theatre	West End debut	

== Awards and nominations ==
Year	Award	Category	Work	Result	Ref.
2005	Tony Awards	Best Featured Actor in a Play	Who's Afraid of Virginia Woolf?	Nominated	
2017	Actor Awards	Outstanding Performance by an Ensemble in a Drama Series	Stranger Things	Won	
2017	Fangoria Chainsaw Awards	Best TV Supporting Actor	Stranger Things	Nominated	
2017	Primetime Emmy Awards	Outstanding Supporting Actor in a Drama Series	Stranger Things	Nominated	
2018	Critics' Choice Television Awards	Best Supporting Actor in a Drama Series	Stranger Things	Won	
2018	Golden Globe Awards	Best Supporting Actor – Series, Miniseries or Television Film	Stranger Things	Nominated	
2018	Actor Awards	Outstanding Performance by an Ensemble in a Drama Series	Stranger Things	Nominated	
2018	Actor Awards	Outstanding Performance by a Male Actor in a Drama Series	Stranger Things	Nominated	
2018	Primetime Emmy Awards	Outstanding Supporting Actor in a Drama Series	Stranger Things	Nominated	
2020	Actor Awards	Outstanding Performance by an Ensemble in a Drama Series	Stranger Things	Nominated	
2020	Actor Awards	Outstanding Performance by a Male Actor in a Drama Series	Stranger Things	Nominated	
2020	Golden Raspberry Awards	Worst Actor	Hellboy	Nominated	
2025	Critics' Choice Super Awards	Best Actor in a Superhero Movie	Thunderbolts*	Nominated	
2026	Primetime Emmy Awards	Outstanding Limited or Anthology Series	DTF St. Louis	Won	
2026	Primetime Emmy Awards	Outstanding Supporting Actor in a Limited or Anthology Series or Movie	DTF St. Louis	Won	
