= Violent Night 2 =

- Theatrical release poster
- Directed by: Tommy Wirkola
- Written by: Pat Casey; Josh Miller
- Produced by: Kelly McCormick; David Leitch
- Starring: David Harbour; Kristen Bell; Jared Harris; Joe Pantoliano; Maxwell Friedman; Daniela Melchior; Andrew Bachelor
- Cinematography: Matthew Weston
- Edited by: Martin Stoltz
- Music by: Dominic Lewis
- Production company: 87North Productions
- Distributed by: Universal Pictures
- Release date: December 4, 2026
- Running time: 110 minutes
- Country: United States
- Language: English

Violent Night 2 is an upcoming American Christmas action comedy film directed by Tommy Wirkola and written by Pat Casey and Josh Miller. It is a sequel to Violent Night (2022). David Harbour reprises his role as Santa Claus, with Kristen Bell, Jared Harris, Joe Pantoliano, Maxwell Friedman, Daniela Melchior, and Andrew Bachelor joining the cast.

Violent Night 2 is scheduled to be released in the United States by Universal Pictures on December 4, 2026.

== Premise ==
After being put on the naughty list and sapped of his magic, Santa Claus must rediscover the true meaning of Christmas while taking on a ruthless gangster who terrorizes a small community.

== Cast ==
- David Harbour as Santa Claus, a former Viking warrior-turned Christmas icon known to deliver toys to nice children.
- Kristen Bell as Mrs. Claus
- Jared Harris as Mason, a ruthless gangster
- Joe Pantoliano
- Maxwell Friedman
- Daniela Melchior
- Andrew Bachelor

== Production ==
In November 2022, David Harbour mentioned that there were discussions about a potential sequel during production of the first Violent Night. The actor expressed interest in seeing Charlize Theron in the role of Mrs. Claus. In December of the same year, Tommy Wirkola confirmed that there have been ongoing discussions between him and the writers, with potential for Mrs. Claus, the North Pole, and the elves factoring into the story. The filmmaker stated that the realization of a follow-up movie depended on the success of the first film. Later that month, producer Kelly McCormick confirmed that all creatives involved intended to make a sequel with work on the project commencing in "the next few weeks". In January 2023, it was confirmed that a sequel was already in development.

In March 2024, Harbour said in an interview that production could start in early 2025 if "the time would be found in everyone's schedule". In December 2024, Harbour claimed that writing was already underway. Later in the same month, it was confirmed that Pat Casey and Josh Miller, the writers of the first film, had written a script and were polishing it. Miller expressed that the sequel would have "western influence" and that Miracle on 34th Street (1947) would act as a big influence for the film. In August 2025, Daniela Melchior and Kristen Bell joined the cast. Jared Harris, Joe Pantoliano, Maxwell Friedman and Andrew Bachelor joined the cast the next month.

=== Filming ===
Principal photography began in Winnipeg on September 2, 2025, and wrapped on October 15.

=== Music ===
In August 2026, it was announced that Dominic Lewis would return from the first film to compose the score for this film.

== Release ==
Violent Night 2 is scheduled to be released in the United States on December 4, 2026.
