= Tommy Wirkola =

Norwegian filmmaker (born 1979)

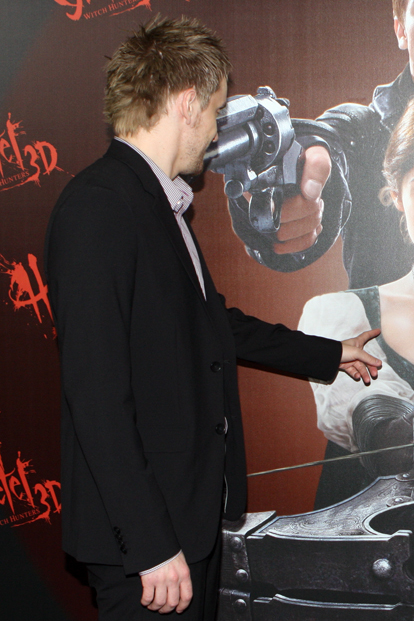
- Wirkola in 2013
- Born: 6 December 1979 (age 46); Alta, Norway
- Education: Bond University
- Occupations: Film director, screenwriter, producer, actor

Tommy Wirkola (born 6 December 1979) is a Norwegian filmmaker. He is known for his film work in hybrid thrillers that combine horror, action and satire, including Dead Snow (2009) and Dead Snow 2: Red vs. Dead (2014), which were both selected for the Sundance Film Festival.

For his hybrid genre-focused work, he has won numerous awards and nominations. Dead Snow won the and was nominated for four Scream Awards including Best Horror Film. Dead Snow 2 won him Best Film at the Horror Film Festival, Best Director at the International Fantastic Film Festival and Best Screenplay as well as Best Film at Alamo Drafthouse's Fantastic Festival in 2014. What Happened to Monday was nominated for Variety's Piazza Grande Award at the Locarno International Film Festival in 2017. Hansel & Gretel: Witch Hunters (2013) was nominated for the People's Choice Award for Best Horror Film. Violent Night (2022) was nominated for Most Outstanding Stunt Performance at the ACTRA Awards as well as for Best Original Score at the International Film Music Critics Awards and at the Reel Music Film Festival.

== Early life ==
Wirkola is of Finnish and Kven ancestry.

== Career ==
Wirkola's first film was 2007's Kill Buljo, which he co-wrote with Stig Frode Henriksen. They later collaborated on the 2009 horror comedy Dead Snow, the 2010 mockumentary Kurt Josef Wagle and the Legend of the Fjord Witch, and the 2014 sequel to Dead Snow, Red vs. Dead.

In 2012 Wirkola directed & produced the television comedy series Hellfjord. Consisting of seven thirty minute episodes, the series is about an Oslo police officer who is banished to a small village after accidentally killing his police horse.

Wirkola's first English-language, large-budget film, Hansel & Gretel: Witch Hunters, was released in 2013 to mainly negative reviews. Starring Jeremy Renner and Gemma Arterton, the film was nevertheless a financial success, grossing $226.3 million worldwide on a budget of $50 million.

What Happened to Monday, a science fiction film starring Noomi Rapace and Willem Dafoe, and the dark comedy The Trip, also starring Rapace, were released in 2017 and 2021 respectively.

Wirkola's next film, Violent Night, a dark comedy starring David Harbour as a vigilante Santa Claus, was released in December 2022. The film received generally positive reviews from critics and grossed $76.6 million worldwide.

Wirkola co-directed the 2024 animated musical sex comedy Spermageddon, a dual narrative focusing on both a teenage couple having sex for the first time and Simen the Semen and his friends in a quest for the Egg.

In May 2024, it was announced that Wirkola had signed with Columbia Pictures to develop a survival thriller titled Beneath the Storm, with Phoebe Dynevor cast in the lead role. That August, principal photography began in Australia, with Whitney Peak and Djimon Hounsou joining the cast. In March 2025, the film was renamed Shiver.

== Filmography ==
Film

| Year | Title | Director | Writer | Editor |
|---|---|---|---|---|
| 2006 | Remake | Yes | No | No |
| 2007 | Kill Buljo | Yes | Yes | Yes |
| 2009 | Dead Snow | Yes | Yes | No |
| 2010 | Kurt Josef Wagle and the Legend of the Fjord Witch | Yes | Yes | Yes |
| 2013 | Hansel & Gretel: Witch Hunters | Yes | Yes | No |
| 2013 | Kill Buljo 2 | No | Yes | No |
| 2014 | Dead Snow 2: Red vs. Dead | Yes | Yes | No |
| 2017 | Kurt Josef Wagle and the Murder Mystery on the Hurtigruta | Yes | Yes | No |
| 2017 | What Happened to Monday | Yes | No | No |
| 2021 | The Trip | Yes | Yes | No |
| 2022 | Violent Night | Yes | No | No |
| 2024 | Spermageddon | Yes (Note: Co-directed with Rasmus A. Sivertsen) | Yes | No |
| 2026 | Over Your Dead Body | No | Yes | No |
| 2026 | Thrash | Yes | Yes | No |
| 2026 | Violent Night 2 † | Yes | No | No |

Television

| Year | Title | Director | Writer | Editor |
|---|---|---|---|---|
| 2012 | Hellfjord | No | Yes | No |

Acting roles

| Year | Title | Role |
|---|---|---|
| 2006 | Remake | Attendant 2 |
| 2007 | Kill Buljo | Sid Wisløff |
| 2009 | Dead Snow | Dying Zombie (Uncredited) |
| 2009 | Tomme Tønner | Gjørme-Knut |
| 2010 | Kurt Josef Wagle and the Legend of the Fjord Witch | Pablo (Voice) |
| 2013 | Hansel & Gretel: Witch Hunters | Deputy #4 |
| 2013 | Kill Buljo 2 | Sid Wisløff |

== Awards and nominations ==
| Year | Work | Awards | Category | Result |
|---|---|---|---|---|
| 2009 | Dead Snow | Toronto After Dark Film Festival Audience Awards | Best Feature Film | Winner |
| 2009 | Dead Snow | Scream Awards | Best Horror Movie | Nominee |
| 2009 | Dead Snow | Scream Awards | Best Foreign Movie | Nominee |
| 2010 | Dead Snow | Kosmorama Kanon Award | Best Innovation | Nominee |
| 2014 | Hansel & Gretel: Witch Hunters | People's Choice Awards | Favorite Horror Movie | Nominee |
| 2014 | Dead Snow 2: Red vs. Dead | Bucheon International Fantastic Film Festival Choice Awards | Audience Award for Feature Film | Winner |
| 2014 | Dead Snow 2: Red vs. Dead | Bucheon International Fantastic Film Festival Choice Awards | Best Director | Winner |
| 2014 | Dead Snow 2: Red vs. Dead | Fantasia International Film Festival | Best International Film | Nominee |
| 2014 | Dead Snow 2: Red vs. Dead | Fantastic Fest Gutbuster Comedy Features Awards | Best Picture | Winner |
| 2014 | Dead Snow 2: Red vs. Dead | Fantastic Fest Gutbuster Comedy Features Awards | Best Screenplay | Winner |
| 2014 | Dead Snow 2: Red vs. Dead | Sitges Film Festival | Best Screenplay | Winner |
| 2014 | Dead Snow 2: Red vs. Dead | Toronto After Dark Film Festival Audience Awards | Best Feature Film | Winner |
| 2014 | Dead Snow 2: Red vs. Dead | Toronto After Dark Film Festival Audience Awards | Best Film to Watch with a Crowd | Winner |
| 2017 | What Happened to Monday | Locarno Film Festival | Variety Piazza Grande Award | Nominee |
