= Dead Snow 2: Red vs. Dead =

2014 Norwegian comedy horror film

- Theatrical release poster
- Norwegian: Død snø 2
- Directed by: Tommy Wirkola
- Written by: Tommy Wirkola; Stig Frode Henriksen; Vegar Hoel
- Based on: Dead Snow by Tommy Wirkola
- Produced by: Terje Strømstad; Kjetil Omberg
- Starring: Vegar Hoel; Orjan Gamst; Martin Starr; Ingrid Haas; Jocelyn DeBoer; Stig Frode Henriksen; Kristoffer Joner; Hallvard Holmen; Amrita Acharia; Derek Mears; Bjarte Tjøstheim; Christian Rubeck; Charlotte Frogner; Ingar Helge Gimle
- Cinematography: Matthew Weston
- Edited by: Martin Stoltz
- Music by: Christian Wibe
- Production companies: Sagafilm; Tappeluft Pictures; The Fyzz Facility; XYZ Films
- Distributed by: Nordisk Filmdistribusjon (Norway); Sena (Iceland)
- Release dates: 19 January 2014 (Sundance); 12 February 2014 (Norway)
- Running time: 101 minutes
- Countries: Iceland; Norway
- Languages: English; Norwegian
- Box office: $1.2 million

Dead Snow 2: Red vs. Dead (Norwegian: Død snø 2) is a 2014 satiric horror film directed by Tommy Wirkola. It is a sequel to Wirkola's 2009 film Dead Snow. The film was released in Norway on 12 February and in the United States on 10 October 2014. Vegar Hoel reprises his role from the first film as Martin, the sole survivor of an attack by Nazi zombies led by the evil Herzog (Ørjan Gamst). Filming took place in Iceland.

== Plot ==
Previously, Martin and his friends draw the ire of Nazi zombies after unwittingly taking the gold they are after. When Martin is bitten on the arm, he removes the infected arm with a chainsaw. After returning their gold to the Nazi zombies, Martin realizes he forgot a coin. The zombies chase after him, and their commander, Herzog, tenaciously holds on to Martin's car as he flees. An oncoming truck slices off Herzog's arm, which remains in the car with Martin.

After Martin passes out at the wheel and is involved in an accident, he wakes up in a hospital. The police disbelieve his wild stories about zombies and charge him with the murder of his friends. To his horror, Martin finds that a surgeon has attached Herzog's arm to his stump (believing it to be Martin's). The zombie arm goes berserk and attacks everyone within reach. After Martin kills several people against his will, he is sedated and strapped tightly to the bed. In the meantime, Herzog has his lost arm replaced with Martin's arm and begins to conscript more zombie troops by resurrecting freshly killed locals.

Bobby, a young American tourist, sneaks into Martin's room when he hears rumors of a zombie attack. Impressed with Martin's zombie arm, Bobby frees Martin and tells him about the Zombie Squad, American professional zombie hunters. Before Bobby can contact them, the zombie arm throws Bobby out a window. Panicked, Martin follows and administers CPR, but the zombie arm instead crushes Bobby's chest, killing him. Martin flees the police, who believe him to be a child killer, and makes contact with the Zombie Squad - who turn out to be three nerdy friends: Daniel, Monica, and Blake - who promise to come to Norway and assist. In the meantime, they ask Martin to find out what Herzog wants.

At a World War II museum, Martin meets Glenn Kenneth, the souvenir shop's clerk. After the zombie arm intimidates him, Glenn takes Martin to the museum, where they read about Herzog's history: Herzog was originally tasked by Hitler himself to wipe out Talvik for their anti-Nazi sabotage. As Martin realizes Herzog intends to carry out his orders, Herzog and his Nazi zombies attack a group of tourists outside, and following the slaughter, Herzog has his troops arm themselves with old weapons from the museum, including a World War II-era Tiger tank. Martin and Glenn escape death by pretending to be mannequins in the museum. While surveying the carnage, Martin accidentally discovers that his zombie arm can also raise and control the dead. When Daniel arrives, he kills the zombie Martin has resurrected; Martin demonstrates his newfound power by raising it again.

Martin, Daniel, and the sidekick zombie race to find the burial ground of a group of Russian Red Army POWs, who had been executed by Herzog during the war, as Monica, Blake, and Glenn work to slow down Herzog. Monica and Blake convince Glenn to act as bait to draw some of the zombies into a local swamp, where they kill them with pipe bombs they made from the supplies they had. After shooting at them with the tank gun several times, Herzog continues on his way, believing Blake, Glenn and Monica to be dead. Meanwhile, the others discover the graveyard, and Martin raises an entire troop of loyal Russian zombies. All converge at the town, where Martin confronts Herzog. Martin points out that they have evacuated the townspeople and thus prevented Herzog from completing his orders, but Herzog does not care and attacks them.

The battle goes well at first, but the Nazi zombies eventually overpower Martin's Russian zombies after Herzog kills the Russian commander, Lieutenant Stavarin. As the Nazi zombies close in on them, Monica tells Martin to kill Herzog, as it is their only chance. Daniel attempts to take control of the Nazi zombie's tank, Martin directly confronts Herzog, and the others fight Herzog's remaining zombies. Glenn is killed by a sneaky knife attack to the throat by a Nazi zombie, and Monica and Blake are about to be overwhelmed when Daniel fires the tank gun directly at Herzog while Martin keeps him distracted. Herzog is decapitated, and the head goes far off into the further away mountains; his troops fall lifelessly to the ground, saving Monica and Blake.

After they have celebrated, and having been exonerated from the murder charges as the police witnessed the zombie battle, Martin drives to the church where Hanna (his girlfriend who died during the first film) is buried, digs up her corpse, and brings her back as a zombie. The two proceed to make out and have sex as the sidekick zombie looks on in the distance.

In a post-credits scene, the Nazi doctor recovers Herzog's severed head, which opens its eyes.

== Cast ==
- Vegar Hoel as Martin Hykkerud
- Ørjan Gamst as Standartenführer (Oberst) Herzog
- Martin Starr as Daniel
- Jocelyn DeBoer as Monica
- Ingrid Haas as Blake
- Stig Frode Henriksen as Glenn Kenneth
- Hallvard Holmen as Gunga
- Kristoffer Joner as Sidekick Zombie
- Amrita Acharia as Reidun
- Derek Mears as Stavarin
- Bjarte Tjøstheim as Priest
- Christian Rubeck as Policeman
- Charlotte Frogner as Hanna
- Jesper Sundnes as Nazi Doctor
- Tage Guddingsmo as Zombie Navigator
- David Skaufjord as Zombie Tank Driver
- Daniel Berge Halvorsen as Major
- Henry Jónsson as Zombie number 12

Stubbe

- Guðmundur Ólafsson as Elderly Woman
- Ingar Helge Gimle as Doctor Brochman
- Carl-Magnus Adner as Bobby
- María Guðmundsdóttir as Dame I Rullestol

== Production ==
Dead Snow 2: Red vs Dead was shot in both English and Norwegian at the same time. Filming took place in Iceland. Many of the zombies were professional mixed martial arts fighters, and Wirkola found it easy to direct them, as they were willing to perform showy stunts.

== Release ==
Dead Snow 2: Red vs. Dead had its world premiere at the 2014 Sundance Film Festival on 19 January 2014 before being released in its home country of Norway on 12 February. The film screened at the 2014 Stanley Film Festival on 25 April. It was released online on 7 October before receiving a limited theatrical release in the US on 10 October. Well Go USA released the film on home video on 9 December in the US, and Entertainment One released the DVD and Blu-ray on 12 January 2015 in the United Kingdom.

=== Critical reception ===
Rotten Tomatoes, a review aggregator, reports that 80% of 30 surveyed critics gave the film a positive review; the average rating is 6.6/10. The website's critical consensus reads: "Dead Snow 2: Red vs. Dead expands the original's canvas without sacrificing any of its bloody fun, adding up to a sequel that fans of the first are bound to enjoy". On Metacritic, the film has a 59/100 rating based on 10 reviews, signifying "mixed or average reviews".

Dennis Harvey of Variety criticized the film's Troma-style tone and described the addition of the American characters as pandering to international audiences. Boyd van Hoeij of The Hollywood Reporter summed up the film as "cartoon violence and action, gore and humor, all rolled into one schlocky but enjoyable package". Jeannette Catsoulis of The New York Times wrote, "...if the movie's hilariously cruel treatment of the halt and the lame upsets you, you can enjoy the crisp cinematography, operatically repulsive effects and frequently witty dialogue". Robert Abele of the Los Angeles Times wrote: "As bad-taste splatter comedies go, Dead Snow 2 is one of the more charitably nutty ones, less about gorging on gore than reveling in how silly the whole genre can be". Clark Collis of Entertainment Weekly rated it B and called it "dementedly enjoyable".

Ryan Daley of Bloody Disgusting rated it 4/5 stars and called the film "a textbook example of a talented director using extreme violence as a cathartic safety valve". Brad McHargue of Dread Central rated it 4/5 stars and wrote, "Dead Snow 2 is an utterly silly film that revels in its absurdity, and that’s why it works".

== Other media ==
=== TV Shows ===
"The Good Wife" Bond (TV Episode 2015) Eli watches it on TV

"Evil" Room 320 (TV Episode 2020) Movie is playing on David's Hospital TV

== See also ==
- Zombie Squad
