= Charlotte Frogner =

Norwegian actress (born 1981)

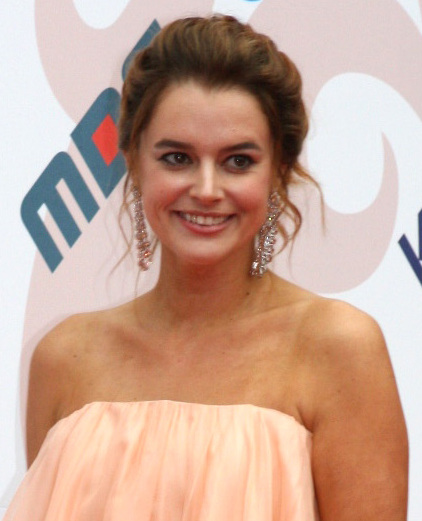
- Frogner at the 2009 Seoul International Drama Awards
- Born: 9 April 1981 (age 45); Aurskog-Høland, Akershus, Norway
- Occupation: Actress
- Years active: 1994–present

Charlotte Frogner (born 9 April 1981) is a Norwegian actress, best known outside of Norway for her role in the Norwegian zombie film Dead Snow. She has been employed by Oslo's Det Norske Teatret since 2004 where she has appeared in a number of productions and acted for Norwegian television. From 28 July to 7 August 2010, Charlotte Frogner played Ingrid / Anitra / the Greenclad woman at the Peer Gynt performance at Lake Gaalaa.

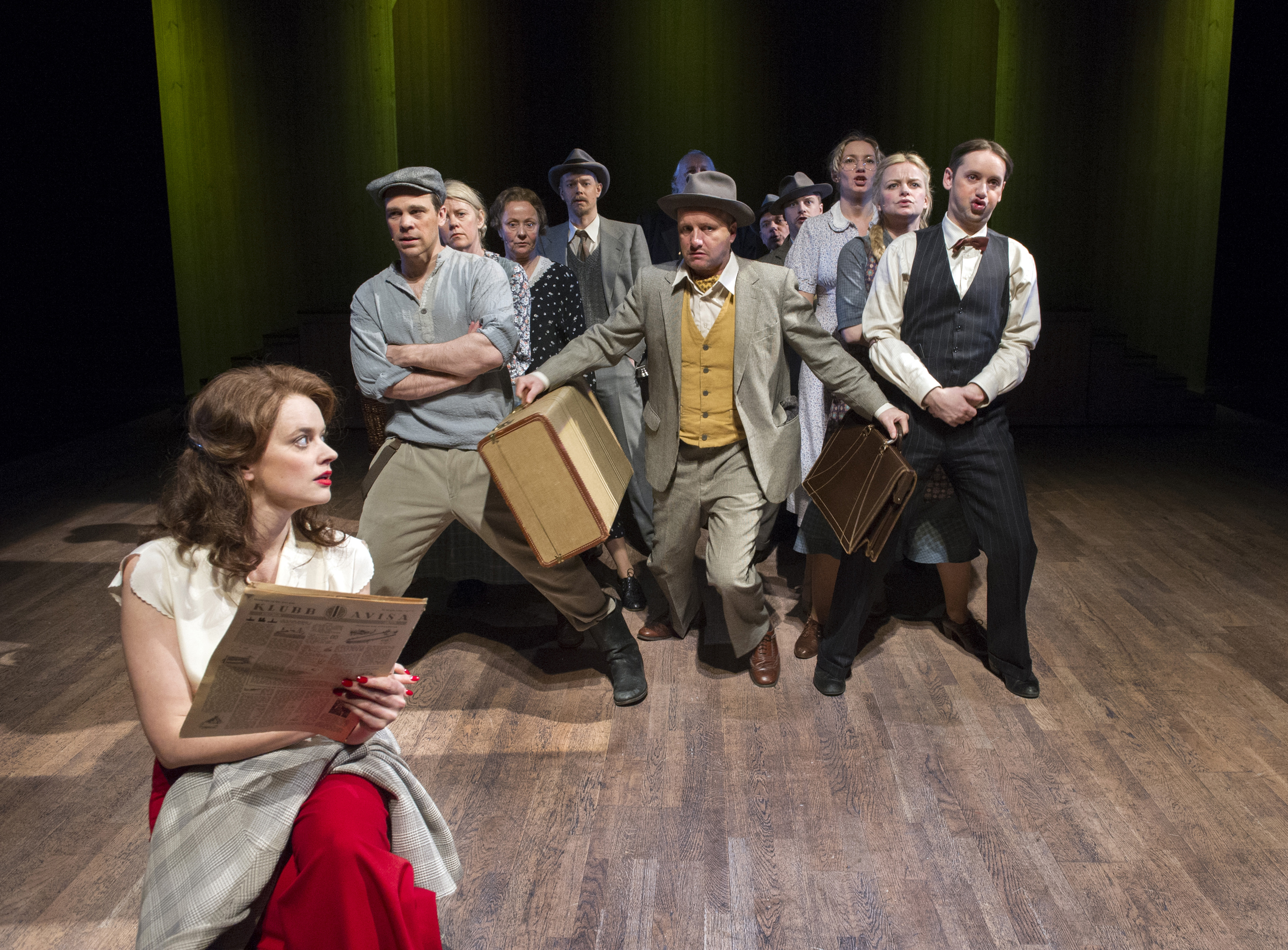
Frogner in 2014 in Alf Prøysen's musical Trost i taklampa

== Filmography ==
- Nora (2006) – Nora
- Noen ganger gjør det vondt (2006) – Anette
- 5 løgner / Five Lies (2007) – Kristin
- Død Snø / Dead Snow (2009) – Hanna Delon
- Brave – Merida
- Død Snø 2 / Dead Snow 2: Red vs. Dead (2014) – Hanna Delon
- Hotel Transylvania 3: Summer Vacation – Ericka
- Just Super (2022) – Mother

== Television ==
- Maria (previously known as Hvaler) (2008) – Maria Blix, 12 episodes
- Jul i Tøyengata (2006) – Barnehagetante
- Side om side (2013–2019) Celine Kopperud, 57 episodes

=== Theater ===
- Natalie i Next to Normal (2010)
- Masja i Eit lykkeleg sjølvmord (2009)
- Evig ung (2009)
- Jesus Christ Superstar (2009) – Maria Magdalena
- Få meg på, for faen / Get me the fuck up (2007)
- Lærde damer (2007)
- Richard II (2007) – Dronning Isabel
- Richard III (2007) – Lady Anne
- Helten på den grøne øya / Hero of the green island (2006)
- Danse samba med meg / Dance samba with me (2006)
- Det folk vil ha (2005)
- Frank (2005)
- Piaf (2004)
