= Jumping after Wirkola =

Norwegian idiom derived from ski jumping

Jumping after Wirkola, an idiom of Norwegian origin (hoppe etter Wirkola), describes the prospect of and the difficulties associated with embarking on a task where one's immediate predecessor has accomplished an unusually good job. English equivalent idioms are a hard act to follow and big shoes to fill.

The difficulties alluded to may be both practical and psychological in nature, and are sometimes related to the aspect of the situation that no one really cares how you are doing, as the audience might have spent all their attention, focus, and enthusiasm admiring and applauding your predecessor.

The etymology of this eponymous idiom relates to the Norwegian ski jumper Bjørn Wirkola. Since Wirkola would be the a priori and a posteriori star of any event he participated in, spectator attention and excitement levels were building up in the minutes leading up to any of his ski jumps, with appropriate crescendo and forte fortissimo culmination during his flying through the air – inadvertently causing the next participant, regardless of fame, nationality or ability, to jump in and into the vacuum of tired spectator silence.

Other countries have similar expressions: for example in Australian popular culture, the equivalent is "batting after Bradman", in reference to Australian cricketer Don Bradman who was considered the greatest batsman in the history of Test cricket.
