= Stig Frode Henriksen =

Norwegian actor, producer, and screenwriter (born 1975)

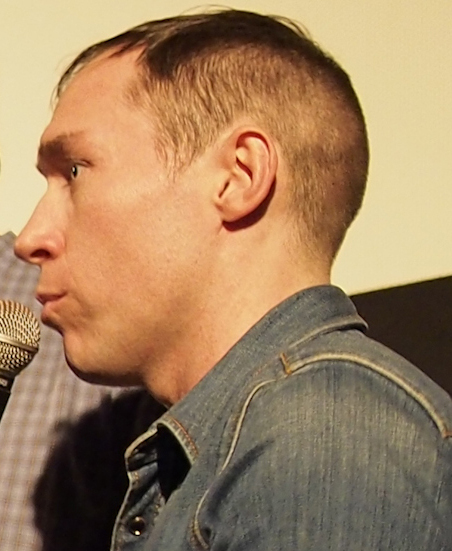
- Henriksen in 2013
- Born: 1975 (age 50–51); Alta, Norway
- Occupations: Actor; producer; writer
- Years active: 2007–present

Stig Frode Henriksen (born 1975) is a Norwegian actor, producer, and screenwriter.

== Biography ==
Stig Frode Henriksen was born in 1975 in Alta, Norway. His acting career began in 2007, with his first role in the film Kill Buljo.

== Selected filmography ==
=== As actor ===
List of appearances, with year, title, and role shown
| Year | Title | Role | Notes |
|---|---|---|---|
| 2007 | Kill Buljo | Jompa Tormann | Actor, writer, executive producer |
| 2008 | Lange Flate Ballær 2 | Military police sergeant | |
| 2009 | Dead Snow | Roy | Actor, writer |
| 2012 | Hellfjord | Kobba | 7 episodes |
| 2012 | Hansel & Gretel: Witch Hunters | mute tracker | |
| 2013 | Hjerterått | Dieter | 8 episodes |
| 2013 | Kill Buljo 2 | Jompa Tormann | Actor, writer, executive producer |
| 2014 | Dead Snow 2: Red vs. Dead | Glenn Kenneth | Actor, writer |
| 2017 | What Happened to Monday | Swat | |
| 2017 | Dragonheart: Battle for the Heartfire | Leiknarr | |
| 2017–2020 | Norsemen | Vebjørn | |
| 2018 | Kielergata | Cato | Creator, writer, actor (2 episodes) |
| 2023 | Vi lover et Helvete | Petter | 6 episodes |
