= Violent Night =

2022 film by Tommy Wirkola

- Theatrical release poster
- Directed by: Tommy Wirkola
- Written by: Pat Casey; Josh Miller
- Produced by: Kelly McCormick; David Leitch; Guy Danella
- Starring: David Harbour; John Leguizamo; Alex Hassell; Alexis Louder; Beverly D'Angelo
- Cinematography: Matthew Weston
- Edited by: Jim Page
- Music by: Dominic Lewis
- Production company: 87North Productions
- Distributed by: Universal Pictures
- Release dates: October 7, 2022 (NYCC); December 2, 2022 (United States)
- Running time: 112 minutes
- Country: United States
- Language: English
- Budget: $20 million
- Box office: $76.6 million

Violent Night is a 2022 American Christmas action comedy film starring David Harbour as Santa Claus, depicted as an immortal Viking warrior who has since become the familiar Christmas figure, as he fights mercenaries who have taken a wealthy family hostage in their home in order to target the money that is in the vault even when those mercenaries are on his Naughty List. The film was directed by Tommy Wirkola and written by Pat Casey and Josh Miller, and also starring John Leguizamo, Alex Hassell, and Beverly D'Angelo.

Violent Night had its world premiere at the New York Comic Con on October 7, 2022. Universal Pictures released the film in theaters in the United States on December 2, 2022. The film received generally positive reviews from critics and grossed $76.6 million worldwide. A sequel, Violent Night 2, is set to be released in December 2026.

== Plot ==
A bitter and jaded Santa Claus has become so fed up with centuries of enabling mankind's materialism and greed that he intends to retire after finishing this year's Christmas deliveries. In Greenwich, Connecticut, Jason Lightstone and his estranged wife Linda take their 10-year-old daughter Gertrude ("Trudy") to his mother Gertrude's mansion for a Christmas gathering. Other family members there are Jason's sister Alva, her boyfriend Morgan Steel, and her 18-year-old son Bertrude ("Bert"). Jason and Linda overhear Trudy's Christmas wish for family unity via an old walkie-talkie Jason gave her, claiming it lets her talk to Santa. Meanwhile, Santa arrives at the estate. However, a group of mercenaries with holiday-themed codenames, led by "Mr. Scrooge", raid the house, kill the security detail as well as staff members, and take the family hostage.

The mercenary "Tinsel" finds the hiding Santa; Santa kills him, but his reindeer are frightened off the roof by gunfire during the fight. Stranded, Santa resolves to rescue Trudy and her family from Scrooge, who is after $300 million in cash hidden in a vault in the mansion. After killing "Frosty", Santa takes his radio and finds Trudy's channel, also discovering that Scrooge and his henchmen are on his naughty list. Trudy manages to run past the kidnappers and hides in the attic. Santa reassures her over the radio, revealing to her his ancient Viking past as "Nicomund the Red".

Santa is captured by "Gingerbread", "Candy Cane", and Scrooge, the latter revealing his hatred for Christmas as a result of childhood trauma. Santa manages to escape up the chimney, although his magic sack of gifts is burned. Morgan also escapes and runs into Gertrude's private extraction squad, led by Commander Thorp, who execute him, revealing their allegiance to Scrooge. Discovering the vault to be empty, Scrooge threatens to kill Linda. Jason admits he stole the money, hid it in an outdoor nativity scene, and planned to escape Gertrude's toxic influence with Linda and Trudy.

Retreating to a shed, Santa finds a sledgehammer and kills numerous extraction squad members. Trudy sets up booby traps in the attic, leading to Gingerbread's death. Santa saves Trudy and kills Candy Cane. Alva, Linda, and Bert overpower and kill "Krampus", while Scrooge and Thorp head into the woods with Gertrude and the money, with Santa in pursuit. Linda kills "Sugarplum" and "Jingle", and Trudy witnesses her parents reconcile.

Santa chases Scrooge down and crashes into an abandoned cabin. Scrooge finds the naughty list, and realizing it is indeed the real Santa, he decides to finally end Christmas by killing him. As they fight, Santa grabs Scrooge and magically flies up a chimney with him, tearing him apart. Thorp shoots Santa but is killed by Gertrude. Santa succumbs to his gunshot wounds. Trudy rallies her family to affirm their belief in Santa, reviving him. His faith in Christmas renewed, Santa receives his returning reindeer and sleigh, a note from Mrs. Claus, a new gift sack, and the return of his long-lost Viking war hammer, Skullcrusher. He bids the Lightstones farewell and takes off to continue his gift deliveries.

== Cast ==
- David Harbour as Santa Claus, a former Viking warrior-turned Christmas icon known to deliver toys to nice children
- John Leguizamo as Scrooge, the mastermind of a heist crew with a disdain towards Christmas (Note: Despite being identified as Jimmy Martinez on the Naughty List, he is credited as "Scrooge".)
- Alex Hassell as Jason Lightstone, son of Gertrude who wishes to distance himself from his mother
- Alexis Louder as Linda Lightstone, Jason's wife
- Edi Patterson as Alva Lightstone, Jason's alcoholic sister who caters to her mother
- Cam Gigandet as Morgan Steel, Alva's boyfriend who wants to be an action film star
- Leah Brady as Trudy Lightstone, Jason and Linda's loving daughter
- Beverly D'Angelo as Gertrude Lightstone, Jason and Alva's wealthy mother with ties to the United States Government
- Ray Strachen as Al, the security guard at the gate
- André Eriksen as Gingerbread, an enforcer in heist crew who initially poses as a butler and is implied to have had a good childhood unlike the rest of his team (Note: Despite being identified as Bjorn Johansson on the Naughty List, he is credited as "Gingerbread".)
- Brendan Fletcher as Krampus, a psychotic killer in the heist crew (Note: Despite being identified as Nathaniel "Nate" Stukas on the Naughty List, he is credited as "Krampus".)
- Mike Dopud as Commander Thorp, the corrupt leader of the Extraction Team in league with Scrooge. He is named for Roderick Thorp, the author of the novel Nothing Lasts Forever, which inspired the similarly-plotted Christmas-set action film Die Hard.
- Alexander Elliot as Bert, Alva's vlogger son
- Mitra Suri as Candy Cane, a vicious member of the heist crew who initially poses as a catering crew's mixologist (Note: Despite being identified as Kira David on the Naughty List, she is credited as "Candy Cane".)
- Can Aydin as Frosty, a member of the heist crew
- Phong Giang as Tinsel, the assault member of the heist crew whom Santa Claus kills first
- Finn McCager Higgins as Jingle, a member of the heist crew
- Rawleigh Clements-Willis as Peppermint, a heavy combat member of the heist crew who poses as a catering crew member
- Stephanie Sy as Sugarplum, the tech expert of the heist crew who poses as a catering crew member (Note: Despite being identified as Jessica Prestwood on the Naughty List, she is credited as "Sugarplum".)

== Production ==
In March 2020, Universal Pictures announced that it acquired the original screenplay to Violent Night by Pat Casey and Josh Miller and that 87North Productions would produce it. In November 2021, David Harbour was cast in the lead role, with Tommy Wirkola set to direct. Wirkola was hired to direct after he sent an early cut of his prior film The Trip to producers at 87North, and after enjoying it, they sent him the Violent Night script. In early 2022, John Leguizamo, Beverly D'Angelo, Alex Hassell, Alexis Louder, Edi Patterson, Cam Gigandet, and André Eriksen were confirmed to star. Principal photography took place from January to March 2022 in Winnipeg, Manitoba, Canada.

== Release ==
Violent Night had its world premiere at the New York Comic Con on October 7, 2022. Universal Pictures released the film in the United States and Canada on December 2, 2022. The film was released on VOD on December 20, 2022 and added to Peacock on January 20, 2023. That same day, it became available for digital purchase, while Blu-ray and DVD releases followed on January 24.

== Reception ==
=== Box office ===
Violent Night grossed $50.1 million in the United States and Canada, and $26.5 million in other territories, for a worldwide total of $76.6 million.

In the United States and Canada, the film was projected to gross around $10 million from 3,682 theaters in its opening weekend. it made $4.9 million on its first day, including $1.1 million from Thursday night previews, and went on to debut to $13.5 million, finishing second behind holdover Black Panther: Wakanda Forever. The film fell 37% in its second weekend to $8.7 million, remaining in second.

=== Critical response ===
On the review aggregator website Rotten Tomatoes, the film holds an approval rating of 74% based on 215 reviews with an average rating of 6.5/10, with many critics drawing comparisons to the Christmas-set action film Die Hard. The website's critics consensus reads "Violent Night isn't as wildly entertaining as its concept might suggest, but for those seeking harder-edged holiday fare, it may be a ho-ho-whole lot of fun." Metacritic, which uses a weighted average, assigned the film a score of 55 out of 100, based on 37 critics, indicating "mixed or average reviews". Opening weekend audiences polled by CinemaScore gave the film an average grade of "B+" on an A+ to F scale, while those at PostTrak gave it an overall positive score of 76%.

MovieWeb wrote, "The first reviews … heap praise on David Harbour's savage Santa Claus." Syfy wrote that "critics hail what might be a new holiday classic that more than earns its R-rating by turning every conceivable Christmas item into a deadly weapon" and that Harbour "steals the show". Total Film wrote that reviews were mixed, "Some critics are calling Tommy Wirkola's movie a fun riff on the festive genre, while others are critical of its plot and length." Box Office Mojo said, "Critics mostly like it."

== Sequel ==
In November 2022, Harbour mentioned discussions of Mrs. Claus appearing in a potential sequel during production of the first film, and expressed interest in seeing Charlize Theron in the role. In December of the same year, Wirkola confirmed that there have been ongoing discussions between him and the writers, with potential for Mrs. Claus, the North Pole, and the elves factoring into the story. The filmmaker stated that the realization of a follow-up movie depended on the success of the first film. Later that month, producer Kelly McCormick confirmed that all creatives involved intended to make a sequel with work on the project commencing in "the next few weeks". In January 2023, it was confirmed that a sequel is already in development.

In March 2024, Harbour said in an interview that production could start in early 2025 if "the time would be found in everyone's schedule". In December 2024, Harbour claimed that writing was already underway. Later in the same month, it was confirmed that Pat Casey and Josh Miller, the writers of the first film had written a script and were polishing it. Miller expressed that the sequel would have "western influence" and that Miracle on 34th Street would act as a big influence for the film. In June 2025, it was reported that Universal had set a release date for Violent Night 2 for December 4, 2026. In August of that year, it was reported Kristen Bell and Daniela Melchior had been cast in the sequel with Tommy Wirkola set to return as director. One month later, Jared Harris and Joe Pantoliano joined the cast.

== See also ==
- List of Christmas films
- Santa Claus in film
