= List of action films of the 2020s =

This is chronological list of action films originally released in the 2020s. Often there may be considerable overlap particularly between action and other genres (including horror, comedy and science fiction films); the list should attempt to document films which are more closely related to action, even if they blend genres.

== 2020 ==
Title	Director	Cast	Country	Subgenre/notes
7500	Patrick Vollrath	Joseph Gordon-Levitt, Aylin Tezel	Germany, Austria, United States	Action thriller
Ala Vaikunthapurramuloo	Trivikram Srinivas	Allu Arjun, Pooja Hegde	India	Action drama
Archenemy	Adam Egypt Mortimer	Joe Manganiello, Skylan Brooks, Zolee Griggs, Paul Scheer, Amy Seimetz, Glenn Howerton	United States, United Kingdom	Superhero, mystery, thriller
Asuraguru	A.Raajdheep	Vikram Prabhu, Mahima Nambiar, Subbaraju, Yogi Babu	India	Action thriller
Aswathama	Ramana Teja	Naga Shourya, Mehreen Pirzada	India	Action thriller
Attack	Lakshya Raj Anand	John Abraham, Jacqueline Fernandez, Rakul Preet Singh	India	Action thriller
Ava	Tate Taylor	Jessica Chastain, John Malkovich, Common, Geena Davis, Colin Farrell, Ioan Gruffudd, Joan Chen	United States	Action, Spy thriller
Bad Boys for Life	Adil & Bilall	Will Smith, Martin Lawrence, Paola Núñez, Vanessa Hudgens, Alexander Ludwig, Charles Melton, Jacob Scipio, Kate del Castillo, Nicky Jam, Joe Pantoliano	United States	Action comedy
Bamfaad	Ranjan Chandel	Aditya Rawal, Shalini Pandey, Vijay Varma	India	Romance, action
Bheeshma	Venky Kudumula	Nithiin, Rashmika Mandanna	India	Action, rom-com
Birds of Prey	Cathy Yan	Margot Robbie, Mary Elizabeth Winstead, Jurnee Smollett-Bell, Rosie Perez	United States	Superhero
Bloodshot	David S. F. Wilson	Vin Diesel, Eiza González, Sam Heughan, Toby Kebbell	United States	Sci-fi, action thriller
Chick Fight	Paul Leyden	Malin Åkerman, Alec Baldwin, Bella Thorne	United States	Action comedy
Coffee & Kareem	Michael Dowse	Ed Helms, Terrence Little Gardenhigh, Betty Gilpin, Taraji P. Henson	United States	Action comedy
Cut Throat City	RZA	Shameik Moore, Kat Graham, Wesley Snipes, T.I.	United States	Heist
Dead Reckoning	Andrzej Bartkowiak	KJ Apa, India Eisley, Scott Adkins, James Remar	United States	Action thriller
Deliver Us from Evil	Hong Wong-Chan	Hwang Jung-min, Lee Jung-jae, Park Jung-min	South Korea	
Disco Raja	Vi Anand	Payal Rajput, Nabha Natesh, Tanya Hope, Bobby Simha	India	Sci-fi action
Earth and Blood	Julien Leclercq	Sami Bouajila, Eriq Ebouaney, Samy Seghir	France	Action thriller
Enter the Fat Dragon	Kenji Tanigaki, Wong Jing	Donnie Yen, Teresa Mo, Wong Jing, Niki Chow	China	Martial arts comedy
Extraction	Sam Hargrave	Chris Hemsworth, Rudhraksh Jaiswal, Randeep Hooda, Golshifteh Farahani	United States	Action thriller
Fatale	Deon Taylor	Hilary Swank, Michael Ealy, Mike Colter	United States	Action thriller
Fatman	Eshom Nelms; Ian Nelms	Mel Gibson, Walton Goggins, Marianne Jean-Baptiste	United States	Action, dark comedy
Force of Nature	Michael Polish	Emile Hirsch, Kate Bosworth, Mel Gibson, Stephanie Cayo	United States	Action
The Gentlemen	Guy Ritchie	Matthew McConaughey, Charlie Hunnam, Henry Golding, Michelle Dockery	United Kingdom, United States	Crime, action, comedy
Ghosts of War	Eric Bress	Brenton Thwaites, Theo Rossi, Skylar Astin, Kyle Gallner, Alan Ritchson, Billy Zane, Shaun Toub	United Kingdom, Bulgaria	Supernatural horror, war thriller
Greyhound	Aaron Schneider	Tom Hanks, Stephen Graham, Rob Morgan, Elisabeth Shue	United States	War, action, thriller
Guns Akimbo	Jason Lei Howden	Daniel Radcliffe, Samara Weaving, Natasha Liu Bordizzo, Grant Bowler	New Zealand, United Kingdom, Germany	Action comedy
Guns of Banaras	Sekhar Suri	Karan Nath, Nathalia Kaur, Abhimanyu Singh, Ganesh Venkatraman, Shilpa Shirodkar, Zarina Wahab, Mohan Agashe	India	Action thriller
Hitman: Agent Jun	Choi Won-sub	Kwon Sang-woo, Jung Joon-ho, Hwang Woo-seul-hye, Lee Yi-kyung	South Korea	Action comedy
Honest Thief	Mark Williams	Liam Neeson, Kate Walsh, Jai Courtney, Jeffrey Donovan	United States	Action thriller
I Am Vengeance: Retaliation	Ross Boyask	Wade Barrett, Vinnie Jones	United Kingdom	
Jiu Jitsu	Dimitri Logothetis	Alain Moussi, Frank Grillo, JuJu Chan, Tony Jaa, Nicolas Cage	United States	Sci-fi, martial arts
Justice League Dark: Apokolips War	Matt Peters, Christina Sotta	Jerry O'Connell, Matt Ryan, Jason O'Mara, Taissa Farmiga, Stuart Allan, Tony Todd, Ray Chase, Rosario Dawson, Shemar Moore, Christopher Gorham, Rebecca Romijn, Rainn Wilson	United States	Animated, superhero
The Last Days of American Crime	Olivier Megaton	Édgar Ramírez, Anna Brewster, Michael Pitt, Sharlto Copley	United States	Action thriller
Love and Monsters	Michael Matthews	Dylan O'Brien, Michael Rooker, Ariana Greenblatt, Jessica Henwick	United States	Action, adventure, fantasy, rom-com
Mafia: Chapter 1	Karthick Naren	Arun Vijay, Prasanna, Priya Bhavani Shankar, Thalaivasal Vijay	India	Action, crime
Malang	Mohit Suri	Aditya Roy Kapur, Disha Patani, Anil Kapoor, Kunal Khemu	India	Action thriller
Monster Hunter	Paul W. S. Anderson	Milla Jovovich, Tony Jaa, Tip "T. I." Harris, Meagan Good	United States	Action thriller
Mortal Kombat Legends: Scorpion's Revenge	Ethan Spaulding	Patrick Seitz, Steve Blum, Jordan Rodrigues, Darin De Paul, Joel McHale, Jennifer Carpenter	United States	Animated, action, martial arts, fantasy
Mulan	Niki Caro	Liu Yifei, Donnie Yen, Jason Scott Lee, Yoson An	United States	Action drama
My Spy	Peter Segal	Dave Bautista, Chloe Coleman, Kristen Schaal, Ken Jeong	United States	Action comedy
The Old Guard	Gina Prince-Bythewood	Charlize Theron, KiKi Layne, Marwan Kenzari, Matthias Schoenaerts, Chiwetel Ejiofor	United States	Action thriller
Palasa 1978	Karuna Kumar	Rakshith, Nakshatra, Raghu Kunche	India	Period action
Pasal Kau!	Adrian Teh	Hairul Azreen, Janna Nick, Amerul Affendi, Namron, Henley Hii	Malaysia	Action, rom-com
Peninsula	Yeon Sang-ho	Gang Dong-won, Lee Jung-hyun, Lee Re	South Korea	Action horror
Project Power	Henry Joost, Ariel Schulman	Jamie Foxx, Joseph Gordon-Levitt, Dominique Fishback, Rodrigo Santoro, Colson Baker, Allen Maldonado, Amy Landecker, Courtney B. Vance	United States	Superhero action thriller
The Rhythm Section	Reed Morano	Blake Lively, Jude Law	United States	Action thriller
Rogue	M. J. Bassett	Megan Fox, Philip Winchester	United States	Action thriller
Sarileru Neekevvaru	Anil Ravipudi	Mahesh Babu, Rashmika Mandanna, Vijayashanti, Prakash Raj, Rajendra Prasad	India	Action comedy
Shivarjuna	Shiva Thejas	Chiranjeevi Sarja, Amrutha Iyengar, Akshatha Srinivas, Kishore	India	Action, family
Sniper: Assassin's End	Kaare Andrews	Chad Michael Collins, Tom Berenger, Sayaka Akimoto	United States	Action
Sonic the Hedgehog	Jeff Fowler	James Marsden, Ben Schwartz, Tika Sumpter, Jim Carrey	United States	Live-action animated hybrid, action-adventure, comedy
Spenser Confidential	Peter Berg	Mark Wahlberg, Winston Duke, Alan Arkin, Iliza Shlesinger, Bokeem Woodbine, Marc Maron, Post Malone	United States	Action, comedy
Survive the Night	Matt Eskandari	Chad Michael Murray, Bruce Willis, Shea Buckner	United States	Action thriller
Superintelligence	Ben Falcone	Melissa McCarthy, Bobby Cannavale, Brian Tyree Henry, James Corden	United States	Action rom-com
Superman: Man of Tomorrow	Chris Palmer	Darren Criss, Alexandra Daddario, Zachary Quinto	United States	Animated, superhero
Superman: Red Son	Sam Liu	Jason Isaacs, Roger Craig Smith, Diedrich Bader, Amy Acker, Vanessa Marshall, Paul Williams	United States	Animated, superhero
The Swordsman	Choi Jae-hoon	Jang Hyuk, Kim Hyun-soo, Joe Taslim	South Korea	Period action
Tanhaji	Om Raut	Ajay Devgn, Saif Ali Khan, Kajol, Neha Sharma	India	biographical action
The Tax Collector	David Ayer	Bobby Soto, Cinthya Carmona, George Lopez, Shia LaBeouf	United States	Action thriller
Tenet	Christopher Nolan	John David Washington, Robert Pattinson, Elizabeth Debicki, Dimple Kapadia, Michael Caine, Kenneth Branagh	United Kingdom, United States	Action, sci-fi, spy thriller
V	Mohana Krishna Indraganti	Nani, Sudheer Babu, Nivetha Thomas, Aditi Rao Hydari	India	Action thriller
Vanguard	Stanley Tong	Jackie Chan, Ai Lun, Yang Yang, Miya Muqi	China	Action, adventure
We Can Be Heroes	Robert Rodriguez	Priyanka Chopra Jonas, Pedro Pascal, YaYa Gosselin, Boyd Holbrook, Adriana Barraza, Haley Reinhart, Sung Kang, Taylor Dooley, Christian Slater	United States	Superhero
Wonder Woman 1984	Patty Jenkins	Gal Gadot, Chris Pine, Kristen Wiig, Pedro Pascal	United States	Superhero

== 2021 ==
Title	Director	Cast	Country	Subgenre/notes
2021
Aaraattu	B. Unnikrishnan	Mohanlal	India	Action comedy
Alludu Adhurs	Santosh Srinivas	Bellamkonda Sreenivas, Nabha Natesh, Anu Emmanuel, Sonu Sood, Prakash Raj	India	Action comedy
Army of the Dead	Zack Snyder	Dave Bautista, Ella Purnell, Ana de la Reguera, Theo Rossi, Tig Notaro, Huma Qureshi, Garret Dillahunt, Raúl Castillo, Omari Hardwick, Hiroyuki Sanada, Matthias Schweighöfer	United States	Zombie, action, heist
Army of Thieves	Matthias Schweighöfer	Matthias Schweighöfer, Nathalie Emmanuel, Guz Khan, Ruby O. Fee, Stuart Martin, Jonathan Cohen, Noémi Nakai, Peter Simonischek	United States	Action, thriller
Batman: Soul of the Dragon	Sam Liu	David Giuntoli, Mark Dacascos, Kelly Hu, Michael Jai White, James Hong, Josh Keaton, Jamie Chung	United States	Animated, martial arts, superhero
Batman: The Long Halloween	Chris Palmer	Jensen Ackles, Josh Duhamel, Naya Rivera	United States	Animated, superhero
Bhuj: The Pride of India	Abhishek Dudhaiya	Ajay Devgn, Sanjay Dutt, Sonakshi Sinha, Nora Fatehi	India	War drama
Black Widow	Cate Shortland	Scarlett Johansson, Florence Pugh, David Harbour, O-T Fagbenle, William Hurt, Ray Winstone, Rachel Weisz	United States	Superhero spy
Boss Level	Joe Carnahan	Frank Grillo, Mel Gibson, Naomi Watts	United States	Sci-fi action comedy
Bright: Samurai Soul	Kyōhei Ishiguro	Yūki Nomura, Daisuke Hirakawa, Shion Wakayama, Miyavi, Maaya Sakamoto, Kenjiro Tsuda, Chafurin, Mamoru Miyano, Kenichi Suzumura	United States, Japan	Animated action adventure fantasy
Cop Secret	Hannes Þór Halldórsson	Auðunn Blöndal, Egill Einarsson, Björn Hlynur Haraldsson and Steinunn Ólína Þorsteinsdóttir	Iceland	Action comedy
Copshop	Joe Carnahan	Gerard Butler, Frank Grillo, Alexis Louder	United States	Action thriller
Dangerous	David Hackl	Scott Eastwood, Tyrese Gibson, Famke Janssen, Kevin Durand, Mel Gibson	Canada; United States	Action thriller
Eternals	Chloé Zhao	Angelina Jolie, Richard Madden, Kumail Nanjiani, Lauren Ridloff, Brian Tyree Henry, Salma Hayek, Lia McHugh, Don Lee, Kit Harington, Gemma Chan, Barry Keoghan	United States	Superhero film
F9	Justin Lin	Vin Diesel, Michelle Rodriguez, Tyrese Gibson, Chris "Ludacris" Bridges, John Cena, Jordana Brewster, Nathalie Emmanuel, Sung Kang, Helen Mirren, Charlize Theron	United States	Action
The Forever Purge	Everardo Gout	Ana de la Reguera, Josh Lucas, Tenoch Huerta, Leven Rambin, Will Patton, Cassidy Freeman	United States	Action, sci-fi, horror
Free Guy	Shawn Levy	Ryan Reynolds, Jodie Comer, Lil Rel Howery, Joe Keery, Utkarsh Ambudkar, Taika Waititi	United States	Sci-fi, action, comedy
Godzilla vs. Kong	Adam Wingard	Alexander Skarsgård, Millie Bobby Brown, Rebecca Hall, Brian Tyree Henry, Demián Bichir	United States	Monster film
Gunpowder Milkshake	Navot Papushado	Karen Gillan, Lena Headey, Carla Gugino, Michelle Yeoh, Angela Bassett, Paul Giamatti	United States	Action thriller
The Hitman's Wife's Bodyguard	Patrick Hughes	Ryan Reynolds, Samuel L. Jackson, Salma Hayek, Frank Grillo, Richard E. Grant	United States	Action comedy
The Ice Road	Jonathan Hensleigh	Liam Neeson, Benjamin Walker, Amber Midthunder, Marcus Thomas, Holt McCallany, Martin Sensmeier, Matt McCoy, Matt Salinger, Laurence Fishburne	United States	Action thriller
Infinite	Antoine Fuqua	Mark Wahlberg, Chiwetel Ejiofor, Sophie Cookson, Jason Mantzoukas, Rupert Friend, Toby Jones, Dylan O'Brien	United States	Sci-fi, action
Jolt	Tanya Wexler	Kate Beckinsale, Jai Courtney, Stanley Tucci	United States	Action
Jungle Cruise	Jaume Collet-Serra	Dwayne Johnson, Emily Blunt, Édgar Ramírez, Jack Whitehall, Jesse Plemons, Paul Giamatti	United States	Action adventure
Justice Society: World War II	Jeff Wamester	Stana Katic, Matt Bomer, Elysia Rotaru, Chris Diamantopoulos, Omid Abtahi, Matthew Mercer, Armen Taylor, Liam McIntyre, Ashleigh LaThrop, Geoffrey Arend, Keith Ferguson, Darin De Paul	United States	Animated, superhero, war
K.G.F: Chapter 2	Prashanth Neel	Yash, Sanjay Dutt, Srinidhi Shetty, Raveena Tandon, Prakash Raj	India	Period action
Kate	Cedric Nicolas-Troyan	Mary Elizabeth Winstead, Woody Harrelson, Michiel Huisman, Tadanobu Asano	United States	Action thriller
The King's Man	Matthew Vaughn	Ralph Fiennes, Harris Dickinson, Gemma Arterton, Rhys Ifans, Matthew Goode, Tom Hollander, Daniel Brühl, Djimon Hounsou, Charles Dance	United States	Spy, action, comedy
Krack	Gopichand Malineni	Ravi Teja, Shruti Haasan, Varalaxmi Sarathkumar, Samuthirakani	India	Action thriller
The Last Mercenary	David Charhon	Jean-Claude Van Damme, Alban Ivanov, Assa Sylla, Samir Decazza	United States	Action comedy
Major Grom: Plague Doctor	Oleg Trofim	Tikhon Zhiznevsky, Lyubov Aksyonova, Aleksei Maklakov, Aleksandr Seteykin	Russia	Superhero
The Marksman	Robert Lorenz	Liam Neeson, Katheryn Winnick, Juan Pablo Raba, Teresa Ruiz	United States	Action thriller
Master	Lokesh Kanagaraj	Vijay, Vijay Sethupathi, Malavika Mohanan, Arjun Das, Andrea Jeremiah, Shanthanu Bhagyaraj	India	Action thriller
The Matrix Resurrections	Lana Wachowski	Keanu Reeves, Carrie-Anne Moss, Yahya Abdul-Mateen II, Jessica Henwick, Jonathan Groff, Neil Patrick Harris, Priyanka Chopra Jonas, Jada Pinkett Smith	United States	Sci-fi, action
Mortal Kombat	Simon McQuoid	Lewis Tan, Jessica McNamee, Josh Lawson, Tadanobu Asano, Mehcad Brooks, Ludi Lin, Chin Han, Joe Taslim, Hiroyuki Sanada	United States	Martial arts fantasy
No Time to Die	Cary Joji Fukunaga	Daniel Craig, Rami Malek, Lashana Lynch, Ben Whishaw, Naomie Harris, Jeffrey Wright, Christoph Waltz, Ralph Fiennes	United Kingdom, United States	Action, spy thriller
Nobody	Ilya Naishuller	Bob Odenkirk, Connie Nielsen, RZA, Aleksei Serebryakov, Christopher Lloyd	United States	Action thriller
The Protégé	Martin Campbell	Michael Keaton, Maggie Q, Samuel L. Jackson, Robert Patrick	United States	Action thriller
Raging Fire	Benny Chan	Donnie Yen, Nicholas Tse, Simon Yam	Hong Kong China	
Ram	Jeethu Joseph	Mohanlal, Trisha, Indrajith Sukumaran	India	Action thriller
Raya and the Last Dragon	Don Hall, Carlos López Estrada	Kelly Marie Tran, Awkwafina, Gemma Chan, Daniel Dae Kim, Sandra Oh, Benedict Wong, Izaac Wang, Thalia Tran, Alan Tudyk	United States	Animated, action-adventure, fantasy
Red	Kishore Tirumala	Ram Pothineni, Nivetha Pethuraj, Malvika Sharma, Amritha Aiyer	India	Action thriller
Red Notice	Rawson Marshall Thurber	Dwayne Johnson, Gal Gadot, Ryan Reynolds	United States	Action comedy thriller
RRR	S. S. Rajamouli	N. T. Rama Rao Jr., Ram Charan, Alia Bhatt, Ajay Devgn	India	Period action
Satyameva Jayate 2	Milap Zaveri	John Abraham, Divya Khosla Kumar	India	Vigilante action
Sheenogai	Abu Aleeha	Marina Syed	Pakistan	Action thriller
Shang-Chi and the Legend of the Ten Rings	Destin Daniel Cretton	Simu Liu, Awkwafina, Meng'er Zhang, Fala Chen, Florian Munteanu, Benedict Wong, Michelle Yeoh, Ben Kingsley, Tony Leung	United States	Superhero, martial arts
Snake Eyes	Robert Schwentke	Henry Golding, Andrew Koji, Iko Uwais, Úrsula Corberó, Samara Weaving	United States	Action thriller
Spider-Man: No Way Home	Jon Watts	Tom Holland, Zendaya, Jacob Batalon, Marisa Tomei, Jamie Foxx, Benedict Cumberbatch	United States	Superhero, action
The Suicide Squad	James Gunn	Margot Robbie, Viola Davis, Joel Kinnaman, Jai Courtney, David Dastmalchian, Daniela Melchior, Steve Agee	United States	Superhero, action
Sweet Girl	Brian Andrew Mendoza	Jason Momoa, Isabela Merced, Manuel Garcia-Rulfo, Raza Jaffrey, Adria Arjona, Justin Bartha, Lex Scott Davis, Michael Raymond-James, Dominic Fumusa, Brian Howe, Nelson Franklin, Reggie Lee, Marisa Tomei	United States	Action thriller
Thunder Force	Ben Falcone	Melissa McCarthy, Octavia Spencer, Pom Klementieff, Melissa Leo	United States	Superhero comedy
The Tomorrow War	Chris McKay	Chris Pratt, Yvonne Strahovski, J. K. Simmons, Betty Gilpin	United States	Sci-fi, action
Vanquish	George Gallo	Morgan Freeman, Ruby Rose	United States	Action thriller
Venom: Let There Be Carnage	Andy Serkis	Tom Hardy, Woody Harrelson, Michelle Williams, Reid Scott, Naomie Harris	United States	Superhero, action thriller
Wild Dog	Ashishor Solomon	Nagarjuna, Dia Mirza, Saiyami Kher, Atul Kulkarni	India	Action thriller
Without Remorse	Stefano Sollima	Michael B. Jordan, Jamie Bell, Jodie Turner-Smith, Luke Mitchell, Jack Kesy, Colman Domingo	United States	Action thriller
Wrath of Man	Guy Ritchie	Jason Statham, Holt McCallany, Scott Eastwood, Jeffrey Donovan, Laz Alonso, Josh Hartnett, Post Malone	United States	Action thriller
Zack Snyder's Justice League	Zack Snyder	Ben Affleck, Henry Cavill, Gal Gadot, Ezra Miller, Ray Fisher, Jason Momoa	United States	Superhero, action

== 2022 ==
Title	Director	Cast	Country	Subgenre/notes
2022
The 355	Simon Kinberg	Jessica Chastain, Lupita Nyong'o, Penélope Cruz, Diane Kruger, Fan Bingbing, Sebastian Stan, Édgar Ramírez	United States	Action thriller
All Quiet on the Western Front	Edward Berger	Daniel Brühl, Albrecht Schuch, Sebastian Hülk	Germany	War drama
Almighty Zeus	Chris Soriano	Chris Soriano, Michael D'Aguilar, Peter Laboy, Ari Huber	United States	
Ambulance	Michael Bay	Jake Gyllenhaal, Yahya Abdul-Mateen II, Eiza González	United States	Action thriller
Avatar: The Way of Water	James Cameron	Sam Worthington, Zoe Saldana, Stephen Lang, Giovanni Ribisi, Joel David Moore, Dileep Rao, CCH Pounder, Matt Gerald, Sigourney Weaver	United States	Sci-fi, action, adventure, epic
The Batman	Matt Reeves	Robert Pattinson, Zoë Kravitz, Paul Dano, Jeffrey Wright, John Turturro, Peter Sarsgaard, Jayme Lawson, Andy Serkis, Colin Farrell	United States	Superhero, action, crime thriller
Beast	Nelson Dilipkumar	Vijay, Pooja Hegde, Selvaraghavan	India	Action comedy
Black Adam	Jaume Collet-Serra	Dwayne Johnson, Noah Centineo, Aldis Hodge, Quintessa Swindell, Pierce Brosnan	United States	Superhero
Black Panther: Wakanda Forever	Ryan Coogler	Letitia Wright, Lupita Nyong'o, Winston Duke, Danai Gurira, Angela Bassett, Tenoch Huerta, Martin Freeman	United States	Superhero, action, fantasy
Brahmāstra	Ayan Mukerji	Amitabh Bachchan, Ranbir Kapoor, Alia Bhatt, Mouni Roy, Nagarjuna Akkineni	India	Action fantasy
Bullet Train	David Leitch	Brad Pitt, Joey King, Bad Bunny, Andrew Koji, Aaron Taylor-Johnson, Brian Tyree Henry, Zazie Beetz, Masi Oka, Michael Shannon, Sandra Bullock, Logan Lerman, Hiroyuki Sanada, Karen Fukuhara	United States	Action thriller
The Buy Bust Queen	JR Olinares	Phoebe Walker, Dir. Gen. Wilkins Villanueva, Ritz Azul, Maxine Medina, Elaine Ochoa, Ayeesha Cervantes, Cheng Alessa, Ameera Johara, Ervic Vijandre, Alex Medina	Philippines	
Catwoman: Hunted	Shinsuke Terasawa	Elizabeth Gillies, Stephanie Beatriz, Jonathan Banks, Steve Blum, Lauren Cohan, Keith David, Zehra Fazal, Jonathan Frakes, Kirby Howell-Baptiste, Kelly Hu, Andrew Kishino, Eric Lopez, Jacqueline Obradors, Ron Yuan	United States	Superhero, crime thriller
A Day to Die	Wes Miller	Bruce Willis, Frank Grillo, Leon Robinson, Kevin Dillon	United States	Action thriller
Day Shift	J. J. Perry	Jamie Foxx, Dave Franco, Natasha Liu Bordizzo, Meagan Good, Karla Souza, Steve Howey, Scott Adkins, Snoop Dogg	United States	Action-horror thriller
Doctor Strange in the Multiverse of Madness	Sam Raimi	Benedict Cumberbatch, Elizabeth Olsen, Benedict Wong, Rachel McAdams, Chiwetel Ejiofor, Xochitl Gomez	United States	Superhero, action, fantasy
The Gray Man	Anthony Russo; Joe Russo	Ryan Gosling, Chris Evans, Ana de Armas, Jessica Henwick, Regé-Jean Page, Wagner Moura, Julia Butters, Dhanush, Alfre Woodard, Billy Bob Thornton	United States	Action thriller
Jurassic World Dominion	Colin Trevorrow	Chris Pratt, Bryce Dallas Howard, Sam Neill, Laura Dern, Jeff Goldblum, Mamoudou Athie, Scott Haze, Dichen Lachman, Daniella Pineda, Campbell Scott, Isabella Sermon, Justice Smith, Omar Sy, DeWanda Wise, BD Wong	United States	Sci-fi, action, adventure
The Lost City	Adam Nee, Aaron Nee	Sandra Bullock, Channing Tatum, Daniel Radcliffe, Da'Vine Joy Randolph, Brad Pitt	United States	Action adventure, action comedy
The Man from Toronto	Patrick Hughes	Kevin Hart, Woody Harrelson, Kaley Cuoco, Ellen Barkin	United States	Action comedy
Morbius	Daniel Espinosa	Jared Leto, Matt Smith, Adria Arjona, Jared Harris, Al Madrigal, Tyrese Gibson	United States	Superhero, action, horror thriller
Salaar	Prashanth Neel	Prabhas, Shruti Haasan	India	Action thriller
Samaritan	Julius Avery	Sylvester Stallone, Martin Starr, Moisés Arias, Dascha Polanco	United States	Superhero thriller
Secret Headquarters	Henry Joost, Ariel Schulman	Owen Wilson, Michael Peña, Jesse Williams	United States	Action, family comedy
Security Academy	Karlo Conge Montero	Jeric Raval, Ricardo Cepeda, Alma Concepcion, Whitney Tyson, Janice Jurado	Philippines	
Sisu	Jalmari Helander	Jorma Tommila, Aksel Hennie, Jack Doolan	Finland	War, action
Sonic the Hedgehog 2	Jeff Fowler	Ben Schwartz, James Marsden, Tika Sumpter, Adam Pally, Natasha Rothwell, Shemar Moore, Jim Carrey	United States	Hybrid animation, action, adventure, comedy
Thor: Love and Thunder	Taika Waititi	Chris Hemsworth, Tessa Thompson, Natalie Portman, Christian Bale, Chris Pratt, Jaimie Alexander, Pom Klementieff, Dave Bautista, Karen Gillan, Sean Gunn, Jeff Goldblum, Vin Diesel	United States	Superhero, action, fantasy
Top Gun: Maverick	Joseph Kosinski	Tom Cruise, Miles Teller, Jennifer Connelly, Jon Hamm, Glen Powell, Lewis Pullman, Ed Harris, Val Kilmer	United States	Action, drama
Uncharted	Ruben Fleischer	Tom Holland, Mark Wahlberg, Antonio Banderas, Sophia Taylor Ali, Tati Gabrielle	United States	Action adventure
Vikrant Rona	Anup Bhandari	Sudeepa, Milana Nagaraj, Nirup Bhandari, Neetha Ashok and Jacqueline Fernandez	India	Action thriller
Violent Night	Tommy Wirkola	David Harbour, John Leguizamo, Beverly D'Angelo, Alex Hassell, Alexis Louder	United States	Holiday action thriller
White Elephant	Jesse V. Johnson	Michael Rooker, Bruce Willis, Olga Kurylenko, and John Malkovich	United States	

== 2023 ==
Title	Director	Cast	Country	Subgenre/notes
65	Scott Beck, Bryan Woods	Adam Driver, Ariana Greenblatt, Chloe Coleman	United States	Sci-fi action thriller
Ant-Man and the Wasp: Quantumania	Peyton Reed	Paul Rudd, Michael Douglas, Evangeline Lilly, Michelle Pfeiffer, Jonathan Majors, Kathryn Newton	United States	Superhero, action, science fantasy, comedy
Aquaman and the Lost Kingdom	James Wan	Jason Momoa, Amber Heard, Patrick Wilson, Yahya Abdul-Mateen II, Pilou Asbaek	United States	Superhero, action, fantasy
Blue Beetle	Ángel Manuel Soto	Xolo Maridueña, Bruna Marquezine, Belissa Escobedo, George Lopez, Adriana Barraza, Elpidia Carrillo, Damián Alcázar, Raoul Trujillo, Susan Sarandon	United States	Superhero
The Covenant	Guy Ritchie	Jake Gyllenhaal, Dar Salim, Sean Sagar, Jason Wong, Emily Beecham, Alexander Ludwig	United States	Action drama
Dungeons & Dragons: Honor Among Thieves	John Francis Daley, Jonathan Goldstein	Chris Pine, Michelle Rodriguez, Justice Smith, Regé-Jean Page, Hugh Grant, Sophia Lillis	United States	Action adventure, fantasy comedy
The Equalizer 3	Antoine Fuqua	Denzel Washington, Dakota Fanning	United States	Vigilante action thriller
Expend4bles	Scott Waugh	Jason Statham, Sylvester Stallone, Dolph Lundgren, Randy Couture, Curtis "50 Cent" Jackson, Megan Fox, Tony Jaa, Iko Uwais, Jacob Scipio, Levy Tran, Andy García	United States	Action
Extraction 2	Sam Hargrave	Chris Hemsworth, Golshifteh Farahani, Adam Bessa	United States	Action thriller
The Family Plan	Simon Cellan Jones	Mark Wahlberg, Michelle Monaghan	United States	Action comedy
Fast X	Louis Leterrier	Vin Diesel, Michelle Rodriguez, Tyrese Gibson, Chris "Ludacris" Bridges, John Cena	United States	
The Flash	Andy Muschietti	Ezra Miller, Michael Keaton, Ben Affleck, Sasha Calle, Kiersey Clemons, Maribel Verdú	United States	Superhero, action, fantasy
Freelance	Pierre Morel	John Cena, Alison Brie, Juan Pablo Raba, Alice Eve, Christian Slater	United States	Action, comedy
Guardians of the Galaxy Vol. 3	James Gunn	Chris Pratt, Zoe Saldaña, Dave Bautista, Vin Diesel, Bradley Cooper, Karen Gillan, Pom Klementieff, Sean Gunn, Sylvester Stallone, Chukwudi Iwuji, Will Poulter	United States	Superhero, comedy
Heart of Stone	Tom Harper	Gal Gadot, Sophie Okonedo, Jamie Dornan	United States	Action, spy thriller
Indiana Jones and the Dial of Destiny	James Mangold	Harrison Ford, Phoebe Waller-Bridge, Mads Mikkelsen, Thomas Kretschmann, Boyd Holbrook, Shaunette Renée Wilson	United States	Action adventure
John Wick: Chapter 4	Chad Stahelski	Keanu Reeves, Laurence Fishburne, Lance Reddick, Ian McShane, Donnie Yen, Rina Sawayama, Shamier Anderson, Bill Skarsgård, Scott Adkins, Hiroyuki Sanada	United States	Action thriller
The Killer	David Fincher	Michael Fassbender, Arliss Howard, Charles Parnell, Kerry O'Malley, Sala Baker, Sophie Charlotte, Tilda Swinton	United States	Action thriller
The Marvels	Nia DaCosta	Brie Larson, Teyonah Parris, Iman Vellani, Zawe Ashton	United States	Superhero, action, science-fantasy
Mayhem!	Xavier Gens	Nassim Lyes	France	
Meg 2: The Trench	Ben Wheatley	Jason Statham, Sienna Guillory, Wu Jing, Skyler Samuels, Sergio Peris-Mencheta, Cliff Curtis, Sophia Cai, Page Kennedy	United States, China	Sci-fi, action thriller
Mission: Impossible – Dead Reckoning Part One	Christopher McQuarrie	Tom Cruise, Ving Rhames, Simon Pegg, Rebecca Ferguson, Vanessa Kirby, Hayley Atwell, Pom Klementieff, Shea Whigham, Esai Morales, Henry Czerny, Cary Elwes	United States	Action, spy thriller
Operation Fortune: Ruse de Guerre	Guy Ritchie	Jason Statham, Aubrey Plaza, Josh Hartnett, Cary Elwes, Bugzy Malone, Hugh Grant	United States	Action, spy comedy
Penduko	Jason Paul Laxamana	Matteo Guidicelli, Kylie Verzosa, Albert Martinez, John Arcilla, Mark Anthony Fernandez	Philippines	Fantasy action
Plane	Jean-François Richet	Gerard Butler, Mike Colter, Yoson An, Daniella Pineda, Tony Goldwyn	United States	Action thriller
Shazam! Fury of the Gods	David F. Sandberg	Zachary Levi, Asher Angel, Jack Dylan Grazer, Faithe Herman, Grace Fulton, Ian Chen, Jovan Armand, Marta Milans, Cooper Andrews, Rachel Zegler, Lucy Liu, Helen Mirren	United States	Superhero, action, fantasy, family comedy
Shotgun Wedding	Jason Moore	Jennifer Lopez, Josh Duhamel, Jennifer Coolidge, Sonia Braga, Cheech Marin, D'Arcy Carden, Selena Tan, Lenny Kravitz, Desmin Borges, Alex Mallari Jr.	United States	Action, rom-com
Spider-Man: Across the Spider-Verse	Joaquim Dos Santos, Kemp Powers, Justin K. Thompson	Oscar Isaac, Shameik Moore, Hailee Steinfeld, Jake Johnson, Brian Tyree Henry, Luna Lauren Vélez, Issa Rae, Jason Schwartzman	United States	Animated superhero film
Target List	Andrew Arguello and MJ Palo	Rachel Alig, Wendy Feign, Shannon Holdridge, Justin Ray and Michael Rock	United States	Action-adventure comedy
Taxi	Harish Sajja	Surinder Singh Bedi, Sammeta Gandhi, Saddam Hussain, Sowmya Menon, Almaas Motiwala, Naveen Pandita, Vasanth Sameer, Surya Sreenivas and Praveen Yandamuri	India	Action thriller drama
Teenage Mutant Ninja Turtles: Mutant Mayhem	Jeff Rowe	Micah Abbey, Shamon Brown Jr., Hannibal Buress, Rose Byrne, Nicolas Cantu, John Cena, Jackie Chan, Ice Cube, Natasia Demetriou, Ayo Edebiri, Giancarlo Esposito, Post Malone, Brady Noon, Seth Rogen, Paul Rudd, Maya Rudolph	United States	Animated superhero film
Transformers: Rise of the Beasts	Steven Caple Jr.	Anthony Ramos, Dominique Fishback, Lauren Velez	United States	Sci-fi, action
Tricycle Driver, Kasangga Mo	Karlo Conge Montero; Sammy Ibarra	Vin Abrenica, Mike Pekto, Sheila Grace Falconer, Rose Ann Ibarra, Ricardo Cepeda	Philippines	Action comedy
Triggered	Richard V. Somes	Arjo Atayde, Julia Montes, Sid Lucero, Kokoy de Santos, Michael Roy Jornales	Philippines	Action thriller

== 2024 ==
Title	Director	Cast	Country	Subgenre/notes
Air Force One Down	James Bamford	Katherine McNamara, Ian Bohen, Anthony Michael Hall, Dascha Polanco, Rade Šerbedžija	United States	Action
Ang Siga ng Tondo... Daw!	Rhene Imperial	Banjo Romero, Lei Fuentes, Shira Tweg, Casey Cham, Omar Flores, Andrew Zapata, Vic Romano, Gilbert Orcine, John Romano, Rhene Imperial	Philippines	Action comedy
Argylle	Matthew Vaughn	Henry Cavill, Bryce Dallas Howard, Sam Rockwell, Bryan Cranston, Catherine O'Hara, Dua Lipa, Ariana DeBose, John Cena, Samuel L. Jackson	United States	Action comedy
Bad Boys: Ride or Die	Adil & Bilall	Will Smith, Martin Lawrence, Vanessa Hudgens, Alexander Ludwig, Paola Núñez, DJ Khaled, Tasha Smith, Eric Dane	United States	Action comedy
The Beekeeper	David Ayer	Jason Statham, Josh Hutcherson, Jeremy Irons	United States	Action thriller
Beverly Hills Cop: Axel F	Mark Molloy	Eddie Murphy, Joseph Gordon-Levitt, Taylour Paige	United States	Action comedy
The Blood Brothers	Cesar Montano	Cesar Montano, Allan Paule, Victor Neri, Ronald Adamat, Alex Vincent Medina	Philippines	Historical action
Borderlands	Eli Roth	Cate Blanchett, Kevin Hart, Jack Black, Jamie Lee Curtis, Ariana Greenblatt, Florian Munteanu, Haley Bennett, Édgar Ramírez	United States	Sci-fi action comedy
Canary Black	Pierre Morel	Kate Beckinsale, Rupert Friend, Ray Stevenson	United States	Action spy thriller
Carry-On	Jaume Collet-Serra	Taron Egerton, Jason Bateman	United States	Action thriller
City Hunter	Yuichi Sato	Ryohei Suzuki, Misato Morita	Japan	Sci-fi action adventure
Civil War	Alex Garland	Kirsten Dunst, Wagner Moura, Stephen McKinley Henderson, Cailee Spaeny, Jesse Plemons, Nick Offerman	United States	Action war
Deadpool & Wolverine	Shawn Levy	Ryan Reynolds, Hugh Jackman	United States	Superhero, comedy
Despicable Me 4	Chris Renaud, Patrick Delage	Steve Carell, Kirsten Wiig, Miranda Cosgrove, Steve Coogan, Pierre Coffin, Will Ferrell, Sofía Vergara, Joey King	United States	Animated action comedy
The Fall Guy	David Leitch	Ryan Gosling, Emily Blunt, Aaron Taylor-Johnson, Stephanie Hsu	United States	Action thriller
Furiosa: A Mad Max Saga	George Miller	Anya Taylor-Joy, Chris Hemsworth, Tom Burke	United States, Australia	Action
Godzilla x Kong: The New Empire	Adam Wingard	Dan Stevens, Rebecca Hall, Brian Tyree Henry	United States	Sci-fi action adventure
Heneral Bantag: Anak ng Cordillera	Perry de Guzman	Jason Abalos, Joni McNab, Rhene Imperial, Jeric Raval, Rey "PJ" Abellana, Jeffrey Santos, Dan Alvaro, Dindo Arroyo, Rob Sy, Benzon Dalina	Philippines	Biographical action
Hit Man	Richard Linklater	Glen Powell, Adria Arjona	United States	Action comedy
The Killer's Game	J. J. Perry	Dave Bautista, Sofia Boutella, Terry Crews, Pom Klementieff, Ben Kingsley, Scott Adkins	United States	Action comedy
Kraven the Hunter	J. C. Chandor	Aaron Taylor-Johnson, Ariana DeBose	United States	Action thriller
Kung Fu Panda 4	Mike Mitchell, Stephanie Ma Stine	Jack Black, Awkwafina, Viola Davis, Dustin Hoffman, Ian McShane	United States	Animated martial arts comedy
Madame Web	S. J. Clarkson	Dakota Johnson, Sydney Sweeney, Celeste O'Connor, Isabela Merced, Emma Roberts, Mike Epps, Adam Scott	United States	Superhero
The Ministry of Ungentlemanly Warfare	Guy Ritchie	Henry Cavill, Eiza González, Alan Ritchson, Henry Golding, Alex Pettyfer	United States	Action, spy comedy
Rebel Ridge	Jeremy Saulnier	Aaron Pierre, Don Johnson, AnnaSophia Robb, James Cromwell	United States	Action thriller
Red One	Jake Kasdan	Dwayne Johnson, Chris Evans, Lucy Liu, Kiernan Shipka, Kristofer Hivju, J. K. Simmons	United States	Action adventure
Sonic the Hedgehog 3	Jeff Fowler	Ben Schwartz, Idris Elba, Colleen O'Shaughnessey	United States	Hybrid animation, action, adventure, comedy
The Thundermans Return	Trevor Kirschner	Kira Kosarin, Jack Griffo	United States	Superhero comedy
Trigger Warning	Mouly Surya	Jessica Alba, Anthony Michael Hall, Mark Webber, Tone Bell	United States	Action thriller
The Union	Julian Farino	Mark Wahlberg, Halle Berry, Mike Colter, Adewale Akinnuoye-Agbaje, J. K. Simmons	United States	Action-thriller
Venom: The Last Dance	Kelly Marcel	Tom Hardy, Juno Temple, Chiwetel Ejiofor	United States	Superhero

== 2025 ==
Title	Director	Cast	Country	Subgenre/notes
Absolute Dominion	Lexi Alexander	Désiré Mia, Fabiano Viett, Alex Winter, Patton Oswalt, Julie Ann Emery, Andy Allo, Alok Vaid-Menon	United States	Sci-fi, action
The Accountant 2	Gavin O'Connor	Ben Affleck, Jon Bernthal, J. K. Simmons, Cynthia Addai-Robinson, Daniella Pineda	United States	Action thriller
Alfa and Bravo	Aaron Otoya	Aaron Otoya, Johnny “Cholo Soy” Zare, Mateo Garrido Lecca, Brenda Matos, Santiago Suárez, Daniela Segura, 'Pantera' Zegarra, Emilram Cossio, Sibenito Osorio	Peru	Action comedy
The Amateur	James Hawes	Rami Malek, Rachel Brosnahan, Caitríona Balfe, Michael Stuhlbarg, Laurence Fishburne	United States	Action thriller
Anaconda	Tom Gormican	Jack Black, Paul Rudd, Daniela Melchior, Thandiwe Newton, Steve Zahn	United States	Action horror comedy
Avatar: Fire and Ash	James Cameron	Sam Worthington, Zoe Saldana, Stephen Lang, Sigourney Weaver	United States	Sci-fi, action, adventure, epic
Back in Action	Seth Gordon	Jamie Foxx, Cameron Diaz, Kyle Chandler, Glenn Close	United States	Action comedy
Ballerina	Len Wiseman	Ana de Armas, Gabriel Byrne, Catalina Sandino Moreno, Norman Reedus, Anjelica Huston, Lance Reddick, Ian McShane, Keanu Reeves	United States	Action thriller
Captain America: Brave New World	Julius Onah	Anthony Mackie, Carl Lumbly, Shira Haas, Tim Blake Nelson, Danny Ramirez	United States	Superhero film
Cleaner	Martin Campbell	Daisy Ridley, Clive Owen, Taz Skylar	United Kingdom	Action thriller
Den of Thieves 2: Pantera	Christian Gudegast	Gerard Butler, O'Shea Jackson Jr., Meadow Williams	United States	Action thriller
F1	Joseph Kosinski	Brad Pitt, Damson Idris, Kerry Condon, Tobias Menzies, Javier Bardem, Sarah Niles	United States	Sports action
The Family Plan 2	Simon Cellan Jones	Mark Wahlberg, Michelle Monaghan, Zoe Colletti, Van Crosby, Kit Harington	United States	Action comedy
The Fantastic Four: First Steps	Matt Shakman	Pedro Pascal, Vanessa Kirby, Joseph Quinn, Ebon Moss-Bachrach	United States	Superhero
Flight Risk	Mel Gibson	Mark Wahlberg, Topher Grace, Michelle Dockery	United States	Action-thriller
Fountain of Youth	Guy Ritchie	John Krasinski, Natalie Portman, Domhnall Gleeson, Eiza González, Laz Alonso, Arian Moayed, Carmen Ejogo	United States	Action adventure
G20	Patricia Riggen	Viola Davis, Anthony Anderson, Marsai Martin, Ramón Rodríguez	United States	Action thriller
The Gorge	Scott Derrickson	Miles Teller, Anya Taylor-Joy	United States	Action horror
Havoc	Gareth Evans	Tom Hardy, Forest Whitaker, Timothy Olyphant	United States	Action thriller
Heads of State	Ilya Naishuller	John Cena, Idris Elba, Priyanka Chopra, Jack Quaid, Paddy Considine, Stephen Root, Carla Gugino	United States	Action comedy
Into the Deep	Christian Sesma	Richard Dreyfuss, Scout Taylor-Compton, Jon Seda, Stuart Townsend	United States	Action thriller
Jurassic World Rebirth	Gareth Edwards	Scarlett Johansson, Jonathan Bailey, Manuel Garcia-Rulfo, Rupert Friend, Mahershala Ali, Luna Blaise, David Iacono	United States	Sci-fi, action
KPop Demon Hunters	Maggie Kang, Chris Appelhans	Arden Cho, Ahn Hyo-seop, May Hong	United States	Animated film
The Legend Hunters	Victoria Mahoney	Zhang Hanyu, Jiang Wu, Celina Jade, Lorenzo de Moor	China	Action fantasy
LifeHack	Ronan Corrigan	Georgie Farmer, Yasmin Finney, Roman Hayeck-Green, James Scholz, Jessica Reynolds, Charlie Creed-Miles, Cael King, Jill Winternitz	United Kingdom	screenlife, thriller
Mission: Impossible – The Final Reckoning	Christopher McQuarrie	Tom Cruise, Hayley Atwell, Ving Rhames, Simon Pegg, Esai Morales, Pom Klementieff, Shea Whigham, Janet McTeer, Henry Czerny, Holt McCallany, Nick Offerman, Angela Bassett	United States	Action, spy thriller
Nobody 2	Timo Tjahjanto	Bob Odenkirk	United States	Action thriller
Novocaine	Dan Berk, Robert Olsen	Jack Quaid, Amber Midthunder, Ray Nicholson, Jacob Batalon, Betty Gabriel, Matt Walsh	United States	Action thriller
The Old Guard 2	Victoria Mahoney	Charlize Theron, Chiwetel Ejiofor, Uma Thurman, Henry Golding	United States	Superhero
Play Dirty	Shane Black	Mark Wahlberg, LaKeith Stanfield, Rosa Salazar, Keegan-Michael Key, Nat Wolff, Chukwudi Iwuji, Gretchen Mol, Thomas Jane, Tony Shalhoub	United States	Action heist
Playdate	Luke Greenfield	Kevin James, Alan Ritchson, Sarah Chalke, Alan Tudyk, Stephen Root, Isla Fisher	United States	Action comedy
Primitive War	Luke Sparke	Ryan Kwanten, Tricia Helfer, Nick Wechsler, Jeremy Piven, Anthony Ingruber, Aaron Glenane	Australia	Sci-fi action horror
Red Sonja	M. J. Bassett	Matilda Lutz, Oliver Trevena, Wallis Day, Robert Sheehan, Michael Bisping, Martyn Ford, Eliza Matengu, Manal El-Feitury. Katrina Durden	United States	Action fantasy
The Running Man	Edgar Wright	Glen Powell, Colman Domingo, Katy O'Brian, Daniel Ezra, Karl Glusman, Josh Brolin, Lee Pace, Jayme Lawson, Michael Cera, Emilia Jones, William H. Macy, David Zayas, Sean Hayes	United States	Sci-fi action
Sacrifice	Romain Gavras	Chris Evans, Anya Taylor-Joy, Vincent Cassel, Sam Richardson, John Malkovich, Salma Hayek	United Kingdom	Acton-adventure comedy
Safe House	Jamie Marshall	Lucien Laviscount, Hannah John-Kamen, Ethan Embry, Lewis Tan, Holt McCallany, Adam Levy	United States	Action thriller
Shadow Force	Joe Carnahan	Kerry Washington, Omar Sy, Mark Strong, Da'Vine Joy Randolph, Cliff "Method Man" Smith	United States	Action thriller
Sinners	Ryan Coogler	Michael B. Jordan, Hailee Steinfeld, Miles Caton, Jack O'Connell, Wunmi Mosaku, Jayme Lawson, Omar Miller Delroy Lindo	United States	Action horror
Sisu: Road to Revenge	Jalmari Helander	Jorma Tommila, Stephen Lang, Richard Brake	Finland	Action
Superman	James Gunn	David Corenswet	United States	Superhero
The Toxic Avenger	Macon Blair	Peter Dinklage, Jacob Tremblay, Taylour Paige, Kevin Bacon	United States	Superhero comedy
Thunderbolts*	Jake Schreier	Florence Pugh, Sebastian Stan, David Harbour, Wyatt Russell, Hannah John-Kamen, Olga Kurylenko, Julia Louis-Dreyfus	United States	Superhero
Tron: Ares	Joachim Rønning	Jared Leto, Greta Lee, Evan Peters, Jeff Bridges	United States	Sci-fi, action
A Working Man	David Ayer	Jason Statham, David Harbour, Michael Peña, Jason Flemyng, Arianna Rivas	United States	Action thriller

== 2026 ==
Title	Director	Cast	Country	Subgenre/notes
Apex	Baltasar Kormákur	Charlize Theron, Taron Egerton, Eric Bana	United States	Action thriller
Balls Up	Peter Farrelly	Mark Wahlberg, Paul Walter Hauser, Molly Shannon, Benjamin Bratt, Daniela Melchior, Eric André	United States	Action comedy
Deep Water	Renny Harlin	Aaron Eckhart, Ben Kingsley, Angus Sampson, Kelly Gale, Madeleine West, Kate Fitzpatrick, Mark Hadlow	United States	Action thriller
Ghost Soldier	William Eubank	Jim Caviezel, Olivia Thirlby, Garret Dillahunt, Shea Whigham	United States	
How to Rob a Bank	David Leitch	Nicholas Hoult, Anna Sawai, Pete Davidson, Rhenzy Feliz, Zoë Kravitz, John C. Reilly, Christian Slater	United States	Action crime comedy
In the Grey	Guy Ritchie	Jake Gyllenhaal, Henry Cavill, Eiza González	United States	Action thriller
Jack Ryan: Ghost War	Andrew Bernstein	John Krasinski, Wendell Pierce, Michael Kelly, Sienna Miller, Max Beesley, Douglas Hodge, JJ Feild, Betty Gabriel	United States	Action thriller
The Mandalorian and Grogu	Jon Favreau	Pedro Pascal, Sigourney Weaver, Steve Blum, Jeremy Allen White, Jonny Coyne	United States	Space Opera
Masters of the Universe	Travis Knight	Nicholas Galitzine, Jared Leto, Camila Mendes, Alison Brie, Idris Elba, Morena Baccarin, Jóhannes Haukur Jóhannesson	United States	Action fantasy
Matchbox: The Movie	Sam Hargrave	John Cena, Jessica Biel, Sam Richardson, Arturo Castro, Teyonah Parris, Randeep Hooda, Danai Gurira, Corey Stoll	United States	Action comedy
Mayday	Jonathan Goldstein, John Francis Daley	Ryan Reynolds, Kenneth Branagh, Maria Bakalova, Marcin Dorociński, David Morse	United States	Action comedy
Mike & Nick & Nick & Alice	BenDavid Grabinski	Vince Vaughn, James Marsden, Eiza González, Jimmy Tatro, Keith David, Emily Hampshire, Arturo Castro, Lewis Tan, Ben Schwartz	United States	Science fiction action comedy
Mortal Kombat II	Simon McQuoid	Lewis Tan, Karl Urban, Jessica McNamee, Tadanobu Asano, Mehcad Brooks, Ludi Lin, Chin Han, Joe Taslim, Hiroyuki Sanada, Josh Lawson, Tati Gabrielle, Adeline Rudolph, Martyn Ford	United States	Martial arts fantasy
Mutiny	Jean-François Richet	Jason Statham, Annabelle Wallis, Jason Wong	United States	Action thriller
The Odyssey	Christopher Nolan	Tom Holland, Anne Hathaway, Zendaya, Lupita Nyong'o, Robert Pattinson, Charlize Theron	United States	Action fantsay
Over Your Dead Body	Jorma Taccone	Samara Weaving, Jason Segel, Timothy Olyphant, Juliette Lewis	United States	Action comedy
The Rip	Joe Carnahan	Matt Damon, Ben Affleck, Steven Yeun, Teyana Taylor, Sasha Calle, Catalina Sandino Moreno, Scott Adkins, Kyle Chandler	United States	Action thriller mystery
Pretty Lethal	Vicky Jewson	Iris Apatow, Lana Condor, Millicent Simmonds, Avantika, Maddie Ziegler, Michael Culkin, Lydia Leonard, Uma Thurman	United States	Action thriller
Shelter	Ric Roman Waugh	Jason Statham, Bill Nighy, Naomi Ackie, Daniel Mays	United States	Action thriller
Spider-Man: Brand New Day	Destin Daniel Cretton	Tom Holland, Zendaya, Mark Ruffalo	United States	Superhero action
Street Fighter	Kitao Sakurai	Noah Centineo, Andrew Koji, Jason Momoa, Roman Reigns, Orville Peck, Callina Liang, Curtis "50 Cent" Jackson	United States	Martial arts action
Supergirl	Craig Gillespie	Milly Alcock	United States	Superhero
Vijaynagar'er Hirey	Chandrasish Ray	Prosenjit Chatterjee, Chiranjeet Chakraborty, Aryann Bhowmik, Pushan Dasgupta, Anujoy Chatterjee, Satyam Bhattacharya, Sreya Bhattacharyya	United States	Action-adventure
War Machine	Patrick Hughes	Alan Ritchson, Dennis Quaid, Stephan James, Jai Courtney, Esai Morales	United States	Science fiction action
World Breaker	Brad Anderson	Luke Evans, Milla Jovovich, Billie Boullet	United States	Science fiction action horror
The Wrecking Crew	Ángel Manuel Soto	Jason Momoa, Dave Bautista, Claes Bang, Temuera Morrison, Jacob Batalon	United States	Cop buddy action comedy
Your Mother Your Mother Your Mother	Bassam Tariq	Mahershala Ali, John Cho, Giancarlo Esposito, Abubakr Ali, Tramell Tillman, Tiffany Boone, Laith Nakli	United States	Action

== Forthcoming ==
Years
2026 2027 2028

2026
Avengers: Doomsday	Anthony and Joseph Russo	Pedro Pascal, Vanessa Kirby, Joseph Quinn, Ebon Moss-Bachrach, Sebastian Stan, Florence Pugh, David Harbour, Wyatt Russell, Benedict Cumberbatch, Robert Downey Jr.	United States	Superhero
Violent Night 2	Tommy Wirkola	David Harbour, Daniela Melchior, Kristen Bell, Jared Harris, Joe Pantoliano, Maxwell Friedman, Andrew Bachelor	United States	Holiday action thriller
2027
24 Jump Street	Rodney Rothman	Jonah Hill, Channing Tatum, Ice Cube	United States	Action comedy
Alone at Dawn	Ron Howard	Adam Driver, Anne Hathaway, Betty Gilpin, Jon Bass, Rohan Campbell, Sean Kaufman, Devon Bostick, Michael Angelo Covino, Lauren Hutton, Ntare Guma Mbaho Mwine, José Zúñiga	United States	War biopic
Animal Friends	Peter Atencio	Ryan Reynolds, Jason Momoa, Vince Vaughn, Aubrey Plaza, Addison Rae, Dan Levy, Lil Rel Howery, Joaquim de Almeida	United States	Hybrid animation action road comedy
Avengers: Secret Wars	Anthony and Joseph Russo		United States	Superhero
The Beekeeper 2	Timo Tjahjanto	Jason Statham, Emmy Raver-Lampman, Bobby Naderi, Jemma Redgrave, Jeremy Irons, Yara Shahidi, Pom Klementieff, Adam Copeland	United States	Action thriller
F.A.S.T.	Ben Richardson	Brandon Sklenar, Juliana Canfield, LaKeith Stanfield, Jason Clarke, Sam Claflin, Trevante Rhodes, Chloe Coleman	United States	Action crime thriller
Godzilla x Kong: Supernova	Grant Sputore	Kaitlyn Dever, Dan Stevens, Jack O'Connell, Matthew Modine, Delroy Lindo, Alycia Debnam-Carey, Sam Neill	United States	Sci-fi action adventure
John Rambo	Jalmari Helander	Noah Centineo, David Harbour, Yao, James Franco	United States	Action, war
Karoshi	Takashi Doscher	Teo Yoo, Isabel May, Cynthia Erivo, Takehiro Hira, Giancarlo Esposito, Bill Camp	United States	Action thriller
Man of Tomorrow	James Gunn	David Corenswet, Nicholas Hoult, Rachel Brosnahan, Edi Gathegi, Nathan Fillion, Isabela Merced, Skyler Gisondo, Frank Grillo, Sara Sampaio, María Gabriela de Faría, Lars Eidinger, Aaron Pierre	United States	Superhero
Sonic the Hedgehog 4	Jeff Fowler	Ben Schwartz, Kristen Bell	United States	Hybrid animation, action, adventure, comedy
Spider-Man: Beyond the Spider-Verse	Bob Persichetti, Justin K. Thompson	Shameik Moore, Jason Schwartzman, Karan Soni	United States	Animated superhero film
Star Wars: Starfighter	Shawn Levy	Ryan Gosling, Flynn Gray, Matt Smith, Mia Goth, Aaron Pierre, Simon Bird, Jamael Westman, Daniel Ings, Amy Adams	United States	Space Opera
Untitled Teenage Mutant Ninja Turtles: Mutant Mayhem sequel	Jeff Rowe		United States	Animated superhero film
Voltron	Rawson Marshall Thurber	Daniel Quinn-Toye, Henry Cavill, Sterling K. Brown, Rita Ora, Alba Baptista	United States	Sci-fi action
Wife & Dog	Guy Ritchie	Benedict Cumberbatch, Rosamund Pike, Cosmo Jarvis, James Norton, Paddy Considine, Anthony Hopkins	United States	Action thriller
2028
The Batman: Part II	Matt Reeves	Robert Pattinson, Andy Serkis, Sebastian Stan, Scarlett Johansson, Charles Dance	United States	Superhero, crime thriller
Black Panther 3	Ryan Coogler	David Jonsson, Denzel Washington, Letitia Wright, Winston Duke	United States	Superhero
Call of Duty	Peter Berg		United States	War
Days of Thunder 2	Jonathan Levine	Tom Cruise, Anne Hathaway	United States	Sports action
Dynamic Duo	Arthur Mintz		United States	Stop-motion animated superhero drama
Elden Ring	Alex Garland	Kit Connor, Cailee Spaeny, Ben Whishaw, Nick Offerman, Tom Burke, Havana Rose Liu, Sonoya Mizuno, Emma Laird, Peter Serafinowicz, Jonathan Pryce	United States	Action, dark fantasy, epic
Fast Forever	Louis Leterrier	Vin Diesel, Dwayne Johnson	United States	
Ghost Rider	Shawn Levy	Ryan Gosling	United States	Superhero
Helldivers	Justin Lin	Alan Ritchson	United States	Sci-fi action
Incredibles 3	Peter Sohn	Holly Hunter	United States	Animated superhero comedy
Miami Vice ’85	Joseph Kosinski	Michael B. Jordan, Austin Butler, Alden Ehrenreich, Danny Ramirez, Camila Morrone, Whitney Peak, John Leguizamo, Walton Goggins	United States	Action crime
Mission: Granny	Toni Weiss		United Kingdom	Animated action comedy
Untitled G.I. Joe film	Danny McBride	Bradley Cooper	United States	Action
Untitled Sonic the Hedgehog spinoff film			United States	Hybrid animation, action, adventure, comedy
X-Men	Jake Schreier	Christopher Abbott, Adam Driver, Sadie Sink, Kit Connor, Inde Navarrette, Samara Weaving, Maya Boyd, Asa Germann, Ben Wang	United States	Superhero
2029
Avatar 4	James Cameron	Sam Worthington, Zoe Saldana, Stephen Lang, Sigourney Weaver	United States	Sci-fi, action, adventure, epic

== See also ==
- Action films
- Martial arts films
- Superhero films
- War films
