= List of spy films =

The following is a list of spy films in alphabetical order.

== Overview and history ==
The spy film, also known as the spy thriller, is a genre of film that deals with the subject of fictional espionage, either in a realistic way (such as the adaptations of John le Carré) or as a basis for fantasy (such as many James Bond films). Many novels in the spy fiction genre have been adapted as films, including works by John Buchan, le Carré, Ian Fleming (Bond) and Len Deighton. It is a significant aspect of British cinema, with leading British directors such as Alfred Hitchcock and Carol Reed making notable contributions and many films set in the British Secret Service.

Spy films show the espionage activities of government agents and their risk of being discovered by their enemies. From the Nazi espionage thrillers of the 1940s to the James Bond films of the 1960s and to the high-tech blockbusters of today, the spy film has always been popular with audiences worldwide. Offering a combination of exciting escapism, technological thrills, and exotic locales, many spy films combine the action and science fiction genres, presenting clearly delineated heroes for audiences to root for and villains for them to hate. They may also involve elements of political thrillers. However, there are many that are comedic (mostly action comedy films if they fall under that genre).

James Bond is the most famous of film spies, but there were also more serious, probing works like le Carré's The Spy Who Came in from the Cold that also emerged from the Cold War. As the Cold War ended, the newest villain became terrorism and more often involved the Middle East.

== List of films ==
Released	Title	Director	References
2019	6 Underground	Michael Bay	
1935	The 39 Steps	Alfred Hitchcock	
1959	The 39 Steps	Ralph Thomas	
1978	The 39 Steps	Don Sharp	
2022	The 355	Simon Kinberg	
2008	Jumper	Doug Liman	
1943	Above Suspicion	Richard Thorpe	
2003	Agent Cody Banks	Harald Zwart	
2017	Allied	Robert Zemeckis	
1965	Alphaville	Jean-Luc Godard	
1967	The Ambushers	Henry Levin	
2012	Argo	Ben Affleck	
2024	Argylle	Matthew Vaughn	
1969	Army of Shadows	Jean-Pierre Melville	
2017	Atomic Blonde	David Leitch	
1997	Austin Powers: International Man of Mystery	Jay Roach	
1999	Austin Powers: The Spy Who Shagged Me	Jay Roach	
2002	Austin Powers in Goldmember	Jay Roach	
1998	The Avengers	Jeremiah S. Chechik	
2025	Back In Action	Seth Gordon	
1948	The Big Clock	John Farrow	
2025	Black Bag	Steven Soderbergh	
2021	Black Widow	Cate Shortland	
1974	The Black Windmill	Don Siegel	
1992	Boris and Natasha: The Movie	Charles Martin Smith	
2002	The Bourne Identity	Doug Liman	
2004	The Bourne Supremacy	Paul Greengrass	
2007	The Bourne Ultimatum	Paul Greengrass	
2007	Breach	Billy Ray	
2015	Bridge of Spies	Steven Spielberg	
2008	Burn After Reading	Ethan Coen Joel Coen	
2014	Captain America: The Winter Soldier	Anthony and Joe Russo	
1958	Carve Her Name with Pride	Lewis Gilbert	
1967	Casino Royale		
2006	Casino Royale	Martin Campbell	
2016	Central Intelligence	Rawson Marshall Thurber	
1963	Charade	Stanley Donen	
2007	Charlie Wilson's War	Mike Nichols	
2000	Charlie's Angels	McG	
2019	Charlie's Angels	Elizabeth Banks	
2003	Charlie's Angels: Full Throttle	McG	
2001	Charlotte Gray	Gillian Armstrong	
1994	Clear and Present Danger	Phillip Noyce	
2002	Confessions of a Dangerous Mind	George Clooney	
1939	Confessions of a Nazi Spy	Anatole Litvak	
2005	The Constant Gardener	Fernando Meirelles	
1962	The Counterfeit Traitor	George Seaton	
2020	The Courier	Dominic Cooke	
1966	The Deadly Affair	Sidney Lumet	
2010	The Debt	John Madden	
1951	Decision Before Dawn	Anatole Litvak	
1971	Diamonds Are Forever	Guy Hamilton	
2002	Die Another Day	Lee Tamahori	
1962	Dr. No	Terence Young	
2013	The East	Zal Batmanglij	
2001	Enigma	Michael Apted	
1981	Eye of the Needle	Richard Marquand	
2021	F9	Justin Lin	
2010	Fair Game	Doug Liman	
2009	Farewell	Christian Carion	
2023	Fast X	Louis Leterrier	
2017	The Fate of the Furious	F. Gary Gray	
1990	La Femme Nikita	Luc Besson	
1982	Firefox	Clint Eastwood	
2008	Flame & Citron	Ole Christian Madsen	
1981	For Your Eyes Only	John Glen	
1940	Foreign Correspondent	Alfred Hitchcock	
1987	The Fourth Protocol	John Mackenzie	
1963	From Russia With Love	Terence Young	
2015	Furious 7	James Wan	
2008	Get Smart	Peter Segal	
1966	The Glass Bottom Boat	Frank Tashlin	
1995	GoldenEye	Martin Campbell	
1964	Goldfinger	Guy Hamilton	
2022	The Gray Man	Anthony and Joe Russo	
1921	The Great Impersonation	George Melford	
1935	The Great Impersonation	Alan Crosland	
1942	The Great Impersonation	John Rawlins	
2016	Grimsby	Louis Leterrier	
2011	Haywire	Steven Soderbergh	
2019	Hobbs & Shaw	David Leitch	
1980	Hopscotch	Ronald Neame	
1990	The Hunt for Red October	John McTiernan	
2002	I Spy	Betty Thomas	
2005	Icon	Charles Martin Smith	
2014	The Imitation Game	Morten Tyldum	
1967	In Like Flint	Gordon Douglas	
2023	Indiana Jones and the Dial of Destiny	James Mangold	
1965	The IPCRESS File	Sidney J. Furie	
2014	Jack Ryan: Shadow Recruit	Kenneth Branagh	
2016	Jason Bourne	Paul Greengrass	
2017	John Wick: Chapter 2	Chad Stahelski	
2019	John Wick: Chapter 3 – Parabellum	Chad Stahelski	
2023	John Wick: Chapter 4	Chad Stahelski	
2003	Johnny English	Peter Howitt	
2018	Johnny English Strikes Again	David Kerr	
2014	Kingsman: The Secret Service	Matthew Vaughn	
2017	Kingsman: The Golden Circle	Matthew Vaughn	
2021	The King's Man	Matthew Vaughn	
2010	Knight and Day	James Mangold	
1970	The Kremlin Letter	John Huston	
1938	The Lady Vanishes	Alfred Hitchcock	
1989	Licence to Kill	John Glen	
1984	The Little Drummer Girl	George Roy Hill	
1973	Live and Let Die	Guy Hamilton	
1987	The Living Daylights	John Glen	
2015	The Man from U.N.C.L.E.	Guy Ritchie	
1997	The Man Who Knew Too Little	Jon Amiel	
1934	The Man Who Knew Too Much	Alfred Hitchcock	
1956	The Man Who Knew Too Much	Alfred Hitchcock	
1974	The Man with the Golden Gun	Guy Hamilton	
1962	The Manchurian Candidate	John Frankenheimer	
2004	The Manchurian Candidate	Jonathan Demme	
1976	Marathon Man	John Schlesinger	
2017	Mark Felt: The Man Who Brought Down the White House	Peter Landesman	
2026	Mayday	John Francis Daley Jonathan Goldstein	
2019	Men in Black: International	F. Gary Gray	
2024	The Ministry of Ungentlemanly Warfare	Guy Ritchie	
2023	Mission: Impossible – Dead Reckoning Part One	Christopher McQuarrie	
2025	Mission: Impossible – The Final Reckoning	Christopher McQuarrie	
2018	Mission: Impossible – Fallout	Christopher McQuarrie	
2015	Mission: Impossible – Rogue Nation	Christopher McQuarrie	
1979	Moonraker	Lewis Gilbert	
2014	A Most Wanted Man	Anton Corbijn	
2021	Munich – The Edge of War	Christian Schwochow	
2020	My Spy	Peter Segal	
2024	My Spy: The Eternal City	Peter Segal	
1983	Never Say Never Again	Irvin Kershner	
2021	No Time to Die	Cary Joji Fukunaga	
1987	No Way Out	Roger Donaldson	
1959	North by Northwest	Alfred Hitchcock	
1946	Notorious	Alfred Hitchcock	
1983	Octopussy	John Glen	
1974	The Odessa File	Ronald Neame	
2019	Official Secrets	Gavin Hood	
1969	On Her Majesty's Secret Service	Peter R. Hunt	
2006	OSS 117: Cairo, Nest of Spies	Michel Hazanavicius	
2009	OSS 117: Lost in Rio	Michel Hazanavicius	
1983	The Osterman Weekend	Sam Peckinpah	
1959	Our Man in Havana	Carol Reed	
1974	The Parallax View	Alan J. Pakula	
1992	Patriot Games	Phillip Noyce	
2014	Penguins of Madagascar	Eric Darnell and Simon J. Smith	
2019	Playmobil: The Movie	Lino DiSalvo	
1967	The President's Analyst	Theodore J. Flicker	
2008	Quantum of Solace	Marc Forster	
2002	The Quiet American	Phillip Noyce	
1966	The Quiller Memorandum	Sidney J. Furie	
2010	Red	Robert Schwentke	
2012	Red 2	Dean Parisot	
2019	The Red Sea Diving Resort	Gideon Raff	
2018	Red Sparrow	Francis Lawrence	
1974	The Return of the Tall Blond Man with One Black Shoe	Yves Robert	
1990	The Russia House	Fred Schepisi	
2012	Safe House	Daniel Espinosa	
2010	Salt	Phillip Noyce	
1968	Salt and Pepper	Richard Donner	
1934	The Scarlet Pimpernel	Harold Young	
1936	Secret Agent	Alfred Hitchcock	
1975	The Secret Agent	Herbert Wise	
2012	Shadow Dancer	James Marsh	
1992	Shining Through	David Seltzer	
1966	The Silencers	Phil Karlson	
2012	Skyfall	Sam Mendes	
1992	Sneakers	Phil Alden Robinson	
2015	Spectre	Sam Mendes	
2019	Spider-Man: Far From Home	Jon Watts	
2019	Spies in Disguise	Nick Bruno and Troy Quane	
1985	Spies Like Us	John Landis	
2015	Spy	Paul Feig	
1914	The Spy	Otis Turner	
1996	Spy Hard	Rick Friedberg	
2001	Spy Kids	Robert Rodriguez	
2011	Spy Kids: All the Time in the World	Robert Rodriguez	
2023	Spy Kids: Armageddon	Robert Rodriguez	
2002	Spy Kids 2: The Island of Lost Dreams	Robert Rodriguez	
2003	Spy Kids 3-D: Game Over	Robert Rodriguez	
2010	The Spy Next Door	Brian Levant	
1965	The Spy Who Came in from the Cold	Martin Ritt	
2018	The Spy Who Dumped Me	Susanna Fogel	
1977	The Spy Who Loved Me	Lewis Gilbert	
2023	Spy × Family Code: White	Takashi Katagiri	
2002	The Sum of All Fears	Phil Alden Robinson	
2001	The Tailor of Panama	John Boorman	
1972	The Tall Blond Man with One Black Shoe	Yves Robert	
2020	Tenet	Christopher Nolan	
1943	They Met in the Dark	Carl Lamac	
2012	This Means War	McG	
1975	Three Days of the Condor	Sydney Pollack	
1965	Thunderball	Terence Young	
2011	Tinker Tailor Soldier Spy	Tomas Alfredson	
1997	Tomorrow Never Dies	Roger Spottiswoode	
1984	Top Secret!		
1987	The Trouble with Spies	Burt Kennedy	
1994	True Lies	James Cameron	
2002	The Tuxedo	Kevin Donovan	
2002	Undercover Brother	Malcolm D. Lee	
1985	A View to a Kill	John Glen	
2020	Wife of a Spy	Kiyoshi Kurosawa	
1999	The World Is Not Enough	Michael Apted	
1968	The Wrecking Crew	Phil Karlson	
2017	XXX: Return of Xander Cage	D.J. Caruso	
1967	You Only Live Twice	Lewis Gilbert	
2012	Zero Dark Thirty	Kathryn Bigelow	

== See also ==
- List of films based on spy books
- List of films featuring surveillance
