= Spy film =

Film genre

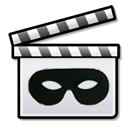

The spy film, also known as the spy thriller, is a genre of film that deals with the subject of fictional espionage, either in a realistic way (such as the adaptations of John le Carré) or as a basis for fantasy (such as many James Bond films). Many novels in the spy fiction genre have been adapted as films, including works by John Buchan, le Carré, Ian Fleming (Bond) and Len Deighton. It is a significant aspect of British cinema, with leading British directors such as Alfred Hitchcock and Carol Reed making notable contributions and many films set in the British Secret Service.

Spy films show the espionage activities of government agents and their risk of being discovered by their enemies. From the Nazi espionage thrillers of the 1940s to the James Bond films of the 1960s and to the high-tech blockbusters of today, the spy film has long been popular with audiences worldwide. Offering a combination of escapism, technological thrills, and exotic locales, many spy films combine the action and science fiction genres, presenting clearly delineated heroes for audiences to root for and villains they want to see defeated. They may also involve elements of political thrillers. However, there are many that are comedic (mostly action comedy films if they fall under that genre).

James Bond is the most famous of film spies, but there were also more serious, probing works like le Carré's The Spy Who Came in from the Cold that also emerged from the Cold War. As the Cold War ended, the newest villain became terrorism and more often involved the Middle East.

== History ==
The spy film genre began in the silent era, with the paranoia of invasion literature and the onset of the Great War. These fears produced the British 1914 The German Spy Peril, centered on a plot to blow up the Houses of Parliament, and 1913's O.H.M.S., standing for "Our Helpless Millions Saved" as well as On His Majesty's Service (and introducing for the first time a strong female character who helps the hero).

In 1928, Fritz Lang made the film Spies which contained many tropes that became popular in later spy dramas, including secret headquarters, an agent known by a number, and the beautiful foreign agent who comes to love the hero. Lang's Dr. Mabuse films from the period also contain elements of spy thrillers, though the central character is a criminal mastermind only interested in espionage for profit. Additionally, several of Lang's American films, such as Hangmen Also Die, deal with spies during World War II.

Alfred Hitchcock did much to popularize the spy film in the 1930s with his influential thrillers The Man Who Knew Too Much (1934), The 39 Steps (1935), Sabotage (1937) and The Lady Vanishes (1938). These often involved innocent civilians being caught up in international conspiracies or webs of saboteurs on the home front, as in Saboteur (1942). Some, however, dealt with professional spies, as in Hitchcock's Secret Agent (1936), based on W. Somerset Maugham's Ashenden stories, or the Mr. Moto series, based on the books of John P. Marquand.

In the 1940s and early 1950s, several films were made about the exploits of Allied agents in occupied Europe, which could be considered a subgenre. 13 Rue Madeleine and O.S.S. were fictional stories about American agents in German-occupied France. There were several films based on the stories of real-life British S.O.E. agents, including Odette and Carve Her Name With Pride. A more recent fictional example is Charlotte Gray, based on the novel by Sebastian Faulks.

Also during the period, there were many detective films (The Thin Man Goes Home and Charlie Chan in the Secret Service for example) in which the mystery involved who stole the secret blue-prints, or who kidnapped the famous scientist.

In the mid-1950s, Alfred Hitchcock returned to the spy genre with The Man Who Knew Too Much (1956 film), a remake of his 1934 film of the same name. He followed this up in 1959 with North by Northwest (1959), widely considered one of the most influential works within the spy genre.

The peak of popularity of spy films is often considered to be the 1960s when Cold War fears meshed with a desire by audiences to see exciting and suspenseful films. The espionage film developed in two directions at this time. On the one hand, the realistic spy novels of Len Deighton and John le Carré were adapted into relatively serious Cold War thrillers that dealt with some of the realities of the espionage world. Some of these films included The Spy Who Came in from the Cold (1965), The Deadly Affair (1966), Torn Curtain (1966), and the Harry Palmer series, based on the novels of Len Deighton.

In another direction, the James Bond novels by Ian Fleming were adapted into an increasingly fantastical series of tongue-in-cheek adventure films by producers Harry Saltzman and Albert R. Broccoli, with Sean Connery as the star. They featured secretive and flamboyant supervillains, an archetype that would later become a staple of the explosion of spy movies in the mid-to-late 1960s. The phenomenal success of the Bond series leads to a deluge of imitators, such as the eurospy genre and several from America. Notable examples include the two Derek Flint films starring James Coburn, The Quiller Memorandum (1966) with George Segal, and the Matt Helm series with Dean Martin. Television also got into the act with series like The Man from U.N.C.L.E and I Spy in the U.S., and Danger Man and The Avengers in Britain. Spies have remained popular on TV to the present day with series such as Callan, Alias and Spooks.

Spy films also enjoyed something of a revival in the late 1990s, although these were often action films with espionage elements or comedies like Austin Powers. Some critics identify a trend away from fantasy in favor of realism, as observed in Syriana, the Bourne film series and the James Bond films starring Daniel Craig since Casino Royale (2006).

== Films ==
Some of the most popular films include:

Movie series (franchises)

- Bulldog Drummond series (1922–1969) – 24 films
- Mr. Moto series (1937–39, 1965) – 9 films
- The Saint series (1938–1943) – 8 films
- OSS 117 series (1956–2021) – 10 films
- James Bond (1962–present) – 25 films
- Harry Palmer (1965–1996) – 5 films
- Matt Helm series (1966–1969) – 4 films
- Lupin III (1974 – present) – 13 films and 28 TV specials
- Carl Hamilton (1989–present) – 10 films
- Jack Ryan (1990–present) – 5 films
- Mission: Impossible series (1996–2025) – 8 films
- Austin Powers (1997–2002) – 3 films
- Charlie's Angels (2000–2019) – 3 films
- Spy Kids series (2001–2023) – 5 films
- The Bourne series (2002–2016) – 5 films
- XXX (2002–2017) – 3 films
- Infernal Affairs (2002–2003) – 3 films
- Johnny English (2003–present) – 3 films
- Fast & Furious (2013–present) – 6 spy films
- Kingsman (2014–2021) – 3 films

Movies

- Spione (1928)
- The Mysterious Lady (1928)
- Three Faces East (1930)
- Dishonored (1931)
- Mata Hari (1931)
- On Secret Service (1933)
- The Lady of Lebanon (1934)
- Madame Spy (1934)
- Stamboul Quest (1934)
- British Agent (1934)
- The Man Who Knew Too Much (1934)
- The 39 Steps (1935)
- Secret Agent (1936)
- Sabotage (1936)
- Lancer Spy (1937)
- The Lady Vanishes (1938)
- The Silent Battle (1939)
- The Spy in Black (1939)
- Night Train to Munich (1940)
- Man Hunt (1941)
- Saboteur (1942)
- Background to Danger (1943)
- Journey into Fear (1943)
- The Mask of Dimitrios (1944)
- Ministry of Fear (1944)
- O.S.S. (1946)
- I See a Dark Stranger (1946)
- Notorious (1946)
- Cloak and Dagger (1946)
- 13 Rue Madeleine (1947)
- The Third Man (1949)
- Decision Before Dawn (1951)
- My Favourite Spy (1951)
- 5 Fingers (1952)
- Diplomatic Courier (1952)
- Pickup on South Street (1953)
- Night People (1954)
- The Man Who Never Was (1956)
- The Man Who Knew Too Much (1956)
- Foreign Intrigue (1956)
- Carve Her Name with Pride (1958)
- The Silent Enemy (1958)
- The Two-Headed Spy (1958)
- The Quiet American (1958)
- North by Northwest (1959)
- Our Man in Havana (1959)
- Man on a String (1960)
- The Secret Ways (1961)
- The Counterfeit Traitor (1962)
- The Pigeon That Took Rome (1962)
- The Manchurian Candidate (1962)
- Charade (1963)
- 36 Hours (1965)
- The Liquidator (1965)
- The Spy Who Came in from the Cold (1965)
- Where the Spies Are (1965)
- Arabesque (1966)
- The Deadly Affair (1966)
- The Defector (1966)
- Derek Flint duology
  - Our Man Flint (1966)
  - In Like Flint (1967)
- Modesty Blaise (1966)
- The Quiller Memorandum (1966)
- Torn Curtain (1966)
- Triple Cross (1966)
- The Venetian Affair (1967)
- Deadlier Than the Male (1967)
- The President's Analyst (1967)
- Hammerhead (1968)
- Ice Station Zebra (1968)
- The Chairman (1969)
- Topaz (1969)
- Darling Lili (1970)
- The Kremlin Letter (1970)
- Madame Sin (1972)
- The Salzburg Connection (1972)
- The Tall Blond Man with One Black Shoe (1972)
- Scorpio (1973)
- The Black Windmill (1974)
- The Odessa File (1974)
- Three Days of the Condor (1975)
- The Eagle Has Landed (1976)
- Marathon Man (1976)
- Telefon (1977)
- Avalanche Express (1979)
- Hopscotch (1980)
- Eye of the Needle (1981)
- Teheran 43 (1981)
- Firefox (1982)
- Top Secret! (1984)
- The Falcon and the Snowman (1985)
- Spies Like Us (1985)
- Target (1985)
- The Fourth Protocol (1987)
- Real Men (1987)
- La Femme Nikita (1990)
- The Russia House (1990)
- Sneakers (1992)
- Shining Through (1992)
- Undercover Blues (1993)
- True Lies (1994)
- From Beijing with Love (1994)
- The Long Kiss Goodnight (1996)
- The Peacemaker (1997)
- The Avengers (1998)
- Ronin (1998)
- Enemy of the State (1998)
- Spy Game (2001)
- The Tailor of Panama (2001)
- The Quiet American (2002)
- Undercover Brother (2002)
- I, Spy (2002)
- Confessions of a Dangerous Mind (2002)
- The Recruit (2003)
- Agent Cody Banks series
  - Agent Cody Banks (2003)
  - Agent Cody Banks 2: Destination London (2004)
- Spartan (2004)
- Walk on Water (2004)
- The Manchurian Candidate (2004)
- Munich (2005)
- Syriana (2005)
- Black Book (2006)
- The Good Shepherd (2006)
- The Lives of Others (2006)
- Breach (2007)
- Charlie Wilson's War (2007)
- Get Smart (2008)
- Burn After Reading (2008)
- Farewell (2009)
- Knight and Day (2010)
- Salt (2010)
- Fair Game (2010)
- The Debt (2010)
- Red (2010)
- Cars 2 (2011)
- Page Eight (2011)
- Tinker Tailor Soldier Spy (2011)
- Haywire (2012)
- Safe House (2012)
- This Means War (2012)
- Ek Tha Tiger (2012)
- Argo (2012)
- Vishwaroopam (2013)
- A Most Wanted Man (2014)
- Captain America: The Winter Soldier (2014)
- Penguins of Madagascar (2014)
- O21 (2014)
- Spy (2015)
- The Man from U.N.C.L.E. (2015)
- Bridge of Spies (2015)
- Iru Mugan (2016)
- Atomic Blonde (2017)
- Unlocked (2017)
- Tiger Zinda Hai (2017)
- Red Sparrow (2018)
- Goodachari (2018)
- Operation Finale (2018)
- The Catcher Was a Spy (2018)
- Red Joan (2018)
- Raazi (2018)
- Vishwaroopam 2 (2018)
- War (2019)
- Official Secrets (2019)
- One Day: Justice Delivered (2019)
- Kaappaan (2019)
- Saaho (2019)
- Romeo Akbar Walter (2019)
- Satellite Shankar (2019)
- The Courier (2020)
- Tenet (2020)
- London Confidential (2020)
- Black Widow (2021)
- Bell Bottom (2021)
- Yaksha: Ruthless Operations (2022)
- The Gray Man (2022)
- Sardar (2022)
- Zarrar (2022)
- Pathaan (2023)
- Operation Fortune: Ruse de Guerre (2023)
- Heart of Stone (2023)
- Tiger 3 (2023)
- Argylle (2024)
- The Ministry of Ungentlemanly Warfare (2024)
- Black Bag (2025)
- War 2 (2025)
- Dhurandhar duology -
  - Dhurandhar (2025)
  - Dhurandhar: The Revenge (2026)
- Alpha (2026)
- Fortitude (TBA)

== Television series ==
Some of the most popular television series include:

Classic era

- Danger Man (1960–1968)
- The Avengers (1961–1969)
- The Man from U.N.C.L.E. (1964–1968)
- I Spy (1965–1968)
- The Wild Wild West (1965–1969)
- Get Smart (1965–1970)
- Mission: Impossible (1966–1973)
- The Prisoner (1967–1968)
- Callan (1967–1972)
- Seventeen Moments of Spring (1973)
- The Six Million Dollar Man (1973–1978)
- The Bionic Woman (1976–1978)
- The Sandbaggers (1978–1980)
- Tinker Tailor Soldier Spy (1979)
- Danger Mouse (1981)
- Smiley's People (1982)
- Reilly, Ace of Spies (1983)
- The Equalizer (1985–1989)
- MacGyver (1985–1992)

Modern era

- Æon Flux (1991–1995)
- La Femme Nikita (1997–2001)
  - Nikita (2010–2013)
- Alias (2001–2006)
- 24 (2001–2014)
- Kim Possible (2002–2007)
- Foyle's War (2002–2015)
- Spooks (2002–2011), aka MI-5
- Burn Notice (2007–2013)
- Chuck (2007–2012)
- The Company (2007)
- Archer (2009–2023)
- Human Target (2010–2011)
- Rubicon (2010)
- Strike Back (2010–2020)
- Homeland (2011–2020)
- Person of Interest (2011–2016)
- The Americans (2013–2018)
- The Blacklist (2013–2023)
- The Honourable Woman (2014)
- Turn: Washington's Spies (2014–2017)
- Madam Secretary (2014–2019)
- The Bureau (2015–present)
- Deutschland trilogy (2015–2020)
  - Deutschland 83 (2015)
  - Deutschland 86 (2018)
  - Deutschland 89 (2020)
- London Spy (2015)
- Fauda (2015–present)
- The Night Manager (2016)
- Counterpart (2017–2019)
- Condor (2018–present)
- Killing Eve (2018–present)
- The Little Drummer Girl (2018)
- The Looming Tower (2018)
- Jack Ryan (2018–2023)
- The Family Man (2019–present)
- The Spy (2019)
- Alex Rider (2020–present)
- Caliphate (2020)
- Tehran (2020)
- La unidad (2020–)
- Andor (2022-2025)
- Slow Horses (2022–present)
- The Agency (2024–present)

== See also ==
- Eurospy film
- List of films based on spy books
- List of films featuring surveillance
- List of James Bond parodies and spin-offs
- List of spy films
- Spy music
