= Alfa and Bravo =

- Theatrical release poster
- Spanish: Alfa y Bravo
- Directed by: Aaron Otoya
- Written by: Aaron Otoya
- Produced by: Juan Pablo Ortiz; Aaron Otoya; Mike Risco
- Starring: Aaron Otoya; Johnny “Cholo Soy” Zare; Mateo Garrido Lecca
- Cinematography: Bernhard Wittich
- Edited by: Aaron Otoya; Jokes Yanes
- Production companies: Chollywood Cine; Cinderbugz Films; Viracocha Studios
- Distributed by: Star Cinema
- Release date: October 16, 2025
- Running time: 103 minutes
- Country: Peru
- Language: Spanish
- Budget: $250,000

Alfa and Bravo (Spanish: Alfa y Bravo) is a 2025 Peruvian action comedy film written, co-produced, co-edited and directed by Aaron Otoya, who also co-stars alongside Johnny “Cholo Soy” Zare and Mateo Garrido Lecca. The rest of the cast is made up of Brenda Matos, Santiago Suárez, Daniela Segura, 'Pantera' Zegarra, Emilram Cossio and Sibenito Osorio, in his film acting debut alongside "Cholo Soy".

== Synopsis ==
The lives of Alfa, a former CIA agent, and Bravo, a motorcycle taxi driver with a penchant for extreme sports, intersect when an international criminal organization calling itself "El Nuevo Movimiento" kidnaps their respective partners. This event forces them to form a troubled alliance to rescue their loved ones, a collaboration that, over the course of the mission, leads to the development of an unlikely friendship.

== Cast ==
The actors participating in this film are:

- Aaron Otoya as Alfa
- Johnny “Cholo Soy” Zare as Bravo
- Mateo Garrido Lecca as 'JuanPa'
- Brenda Matos as Florencia
- Santiago Suárez as Rigo
- Daniela Segura
- 'Pantera' Zegarra
- Emilram Cossio
- Sibenito Osorio as ‘Flaki’

== Production ==
Principal photography began on June 23, 2025 in Quilcas, Huancayo.

== Release ==
Alfa and Bravo premiered on October 16, 2025, in Peruvian theaters.
