= F.A.S.T. (film) =

Upcoming american action drama film

- Directed by: Ben Richardson
- Written by: Taylor Sheridan
- Produced by: David Heyman; Jeffrey Clifford; Taylor Sheridan; Jenny Wood
- Starring: Brandon Sklenar; Juliana Canfield; LaKeith Stanfield; Jason Clarke; Sam Claflin; Trevante Rhodes; Chloe Coleman
- Cinematography: Corrin Hodgson
- Production companies: Heyday Films; Bosque Ranch Productions
- Distributed by: Warner Bros. Pictures
- Release date: May 14, 2027
- Countries: United States; United Kingdom
- Language: English

F.A.S.T. is an upcoming action thriller film directed by Ben Richardson and written by Taylor Sheridan. It stars Brandon Sklenar, Juliana Canfield, LaKeith Stanfield, Jason Clarke, Sam Claflin, and Trevante Rhodes. The film follows a former special forces commando recruited by the DEA to lead a black op strike team against CIA-protected drug dealers.

F.A.S.T. is scheduled to be released in the United States on May 14, 2027.

== Premise ==
"F.A.S.T. concerns a former special forces commando, down on his luck after he returns Stateside, who is tapped by the DEA to lead a black op strike team against CIA-protected drug dealers in his town. Sklenar is playing the commando."

== Cast ==
- Brandon Sklenar
- Juliana Canfield
- LaKeith Stanfield
- Jason Clarke
- Sam Claflin
- Trevante Rhodes
- Wilson Bethel
- John Hoogenakker
- Chloe Coleman
- Grant Harvey
- Hunter Emery
- Mark O'Brien
- Jared Abrahamson
- Barrett Carnahan
- Chloë Levine

== Production ==
Taylor Sheridan wrote the script for the film in the mid-2010s. Warner Bros. Pictures acquired the rights to the film in 2018, with Sheridan initially wanting to direct the film, with Chris Pratt eyed to star. Gavin O'Connor later came on board as director in 2019, but by then, the studio was owned by AT&T, which did not see the financial upside of theatrically releasing a movie with a budget in the $60–70 million range. In May 2025, the project was revived with Ben Richardson set to make his feature directorial debut, and Brandon Sklenar cast in the lead role. Juliana Canfield was cast as the female lead by next month, and Trevante Rhodes in talks to join. In August 2025, LaKeith Stanfield, Jason Clarke, Sam Claflin, and Trevante Rhodes joined the cast. Principal photography began that same month, in New Rochelle, New York. In October, Chloe Coleman joined the cast. Filming occurred in Murcia in November.

== Release ==
F.A.S.T. is scheduled to be released in the United States by Warner Bros. Pictures on May 14, 2027. It was previously scheduled to be released on April 23.
