= Gunpowder Milkshake =

2021 film by Navot Papushado

- Release poster
- Directed by: Navot Papushado
- Written by: Navot Papushado; Ehud Lavski
- Produced by: Andrew Rona; Alex Heineman
- Starring: Karen Gillan; Lena Headey; Carla Gugino; Chloe Coleman; Michelle Yeoh; Angela Bassett; Paul Giamatti
- Cinematography: Michael Seresin
- Edited by: Nicolas De Toth
- Music by: Frank Ilfman
- Production companies: StudioCanal; The Picture Company; Studio Babelsberg; Canal+; Ciné+
- Distributed by: Netflix STX Films (Note: Netflix and STX Films released the film in the United States, Canada and the Nordics.); StudioCanal (Note: StudioCanal released the film in France, Germany, United Kingdom, Australia and New Zealand.)
- Release dates: July 14, 2021 (United States); July 21, 2021 (France); December 2, 2021 (Germany)
- Running time: 114 minutes
- Countries: United States; Germany; France
- Language: English
- Budget: $30 million
- Box office: $1 million

Gunpowder Milkshake (Note: Released in France as Bloody Milkshake) is a 2021 action thriller film directed by Navot Papushado, who co-wrote the screenplay with Ehud Lavski. The film stars Karen Gillan as a young hitwoman who must team up with her estranged mother (Lena Headey) and her former colleagues (Carla Gugino, Michelle Yeoh, and Angela Bassett) in order to save a young girl (Chloe Coleman) from rival assassins sent by the grieving father of a man she killed on orders from the head of the HR department of The Firm, Nathan (Paul Giamatti).

The film's production was announced at the American Film Market in 2018. Casting announcements were made throughout 2019, starting with Gillan in January, and principal photography took place from June to August 2019 in Berlin. It is a co-production between The Picture Company, Babelsberg Studio and StudioCanal's German branch with the participation of French television channels Canal+ and Ciné+.

Gunpowder Milkshake was released in the United States on July 14, 2021, by Netflix with a simultaneous limited theatrical release. It was released theatrically by StudioCanal in France on July 21, and in Germany on December 2, 2021. The film received mixed reviews from critics. A sequel is in development.

== Plot ==
In a flashback at a diner, twelve-year-old Sam learns that her assassin mother, Scarlet, is skipping town after a job gone wrong. Armed men arrive to kill Scarlet, but she kills them and escapes, leaving an upset Sam behind to be cared for by Nathan.

Fifteen years later, the now 27-year-old Sam is an assassin for Nathan, the human resources head for the same firm Scarlet worked for. Nathan gives Sam a new job, killing a man who stole money from The Firm and returning the money. Sam goes to a weapons armory, which is disguised as a library, to exchange her weapons for new ones. There, she meets Anna May, Madeleine, and Florence — three former accomplices of Scarlet. They consider killing her for showing up unannounced, but change their minds when they learn her identity. They provide her with clean weapons for the job.

Sam infiltrates a hotel room to retrieve the stolen money and shoots the man responsible in the abdomen when he lunges for his ringing phone. Listening in on the call, she learns that he stole the money to save his kidnapped young daughter and must bring it to a nearby bowling alley to exchange for her. Sam takes him to a firm-affiliated private doctor for treatment and agrees to handle the exchange herself.

Nathan learns of her plan and sends three henchmen to stop her and retrieve the money; Sam incapacitates them before continuing with her plan. Masked men give her the girl, Emily, before retreating with the money; Sam pursues them, but the men turn on one another, resulting in their deaths and the destruction of the stolen money.

Meanwhile, Nathan learns that one of the henchmen Sam killed in an earlier job was the son of Jim McAlister, the head of a powerful criminal empire. To avoid conflict, Nathan gives up Sam's information and location to be killed. Sam returns to the doctor to reunite Emily with her father, but they learn that he did not survive. Nathan's three henchmen are also at the doctor seeking treatment for their prior fight and they receive orders to kill her. The doctor injects Sam with a serum that renders her arms useless. Sam asks Emily to tape a knife and a gun to her hands and she uses them to fight and kill the three henchmen. More henchmen arrive, but Sam and Emily escape in Sam's car, with Emily steering and Sam working the pedals.

Sam receives a text from Nathan with the address to a safe house where she can find supplies to help her escape. She and Emily travel there and run into Scarlet, who reveals she has been watching Sam from afar for 15 years. When henchmen arrive to kill Sam, Scarlet guides them through a hidden escape route.

They manage to escape and return to the library, where the librarians angrily demand why Scarlet never tried to contact them when she disappeared. They are interrupted by arriving gunmen. Sam attempts to hold them off, but, after she is overpowered, Scarlet intervenes to save her. The librarians consider fleeing with Emily but decide to join the fight.

All the gunmen are killed except for Virgil, Jim McAlister's nephew, who kills Madeleine and kidnaps Emily. Virgil calls Sam, who offers to turn herself in at the diner in exchange for Emily's freedom. Sam arrives to meet Jim McAlister, who explains that his late son had four older sisters that Jim could not relate to as he does not understand women. Jim intends to torture Sam and make Emily watch, but Scarlet, Anna May, and Florence arrive with guns to free them. Sam takes Emily and leaves the diner before the three women kill Jim and all his henchmen.

Sometime later, Sam apologizes to Emily for killing her father and Emily forgives her. Emily goes to Nathan's home disguised as a Girl Scout. Sam threatens his life unless he returns to The Firm and calls off the hit on her. Sam, Emily, Scarlet, Anna May, and Florence then drive down the coast together.

== Cast ==
- Karen Gillan as Sam, a master assassin working for The Firm, and Scarlet's daughter
  - Freya Allan as young Sam
- Lena Headey as Scarlet, Sam's estranged mother and former leader of the sisterhood of assassins
- Carla Gugino as Madeleine, a member of the sisterhood of assassins
- Chloe Coleman as Emily, a young girl Sam protects after killing her father
- Ralph Ineson as Jim McAlester, the leader of a powerful crime organization
- Adam Nagaitis as Virgil, McAlester's nephew and a master assassin
- Michael Smiley as Dr. Ricky, the chief of a secret clinic for assassins
- Michelle Yeoh as Florence, a member of the sisterhood of assassins
- Angela Bassett as Anna May, a member of the sisterhood of assassins
- Paul Giamatti as Nathan, head of the HR department for The Firm, and Sam's adoptive father

Additionally, Samuel Anderson appears as David, Emily's father, Ivan Kaye plays Yankee, the leader of the assassins sent by The Firm after Sam. David Burnell IV and Jack Bandeira complete the group as Shocker and Crow while Mai Duong Kieu portrays a nurse at Dr. Ricky's clinic.

== Production ==
The project was announced during the annual American Film Market in April 2018, with StudioCanal and The Picture Company procuring the rights to the film. In January 2019, Karen Gillan was cast in the film. In February, Lena Headey was cast, with Angela Bassett joining in April, and Paul Giamatti, Michelle Yeoh, Carla Gugino and Ivan Kaye joining in May. In June 2019, Adam Nagaitis, Ralph Ineson and Chloe Coleman joined the cast of the film. Filming began on June 3, 2019, and finished on August 20, 2019, in Berlin.

== Music ==
On December 16, 2019, it was announced that Frank Ilfman was hired to compose the film's score. The score album was released on July 9, 2021, by Milan Records.

== Release ==
=== Netflix and theatrical ===
In February 2020, STXfilms acquired distribution rights to the film in the North and Latin America and China. In April 2021, Netflix bought U.S. distribution rights from STXfilms. Gunpowder Milkshake was released on Netflix in the United States, Canada, and the Nordic countries on July 14, 2021. In the United States, it also received a simultaneous limited theatrical release. It was the most watched film of the week in the country upon its release, according to Nielsen.

The film was released theatrically by StudioCanal in France on July 21, 2021, under the title Bloody Milkshake. In Germany, where the film was originally scheduled for release on September 2, it was released on December 2, 2021, by StudioCanal. Gunpowder Milkshake was released simultaneously in theaters and on Sky Cinema in the United Kingdom and Ireland on September 17, 2021.

=== Home media ===
Gunpowder Milkshake was released in France digitally on October 21, 2021, and on Blu-ray, and DVD on November 3 by StudioCanal with distribution handled by Universal Pictures Vidéo France. On television, the film premiered on Canal+ on January 22, 2022, and was released simultaneously on streaming on MyCanal.

In Germany, the film was released on April 14, 2022, on Ultra HD Blu-ray, Blu-ray, and DVD by StudioCanal with distribution handled by Koch Media.

== Reception ==
=== Box office ===
The film has grossed a worldwide total of $1,015,760.

In France, Gunpowder Milkshake was released alongside Kaamelott: The First Chapter, Space Jam: A New Legacy, Old and Spiral. The film grossed only $63,795 from 103 theaters during its first week, finishing 22nd at the box office behind Nomadland ($70,923 in its seventh week). In France, the film grossed only $76,803 during its theatrical run.

=== Critical response ===
On review aggregator Rotten Tomatoes, the film holds an approval rating of 60% based on 164 reviews, with an average rating of 5.9/10. The website's critics consensus reads, "Though it runs dangerously close to being a pure sugar rush with no substance, Gunpowder Milkshake is a brutal blast that will absorb audiences into its neon infused universe." On Metacritic, it has a weighted average score of 47 out of 100 based on 28 critics, indicating "mixed or average" reviews.

Richard Roeper of the Chicago Sun-Times gave the film 3 out of 4 stars and stated, "If you're going to do an insanely over-the-top, deeply stylized, bullet-riddled and female-centric riff on the 'John Wick' movies, you might as well give it a fantastically ridiculous title." Cody Corrall of the Chicago Reader gave the film 2.5 out of 4 stars and stated, "The emotional highs and lows never really level out, and the special effects feel more schlocky and dated than overtly stylistic, but Gunpowder Milkshake manages to corral a dynamic roster of performers to have fun and blow shit up." Owen Gleiberman of Variety gave the film a positive review and stated, "It's the sort of movie that inspires that ultimate discerning critical comment: It's a movie you'll like if you like this sort of thing." Benjamin Lee of The Guardian gave the film 3 out of 5 stars and stated, "The film is a little jarring at times, as unreal as a video game but perhaps best taken as one, its cartoonish flourishes then easier to allow." John Anderson of The Wall Street Journal gave the film a positive review and stated, "Not everyone's cup of mayhem, assuredly. As compensation for the busy visuals, the storyline will be a comfortable one, especially to fans of La Femme Nikita, Léon: The Professional, Gloria and any number of large-caliber ancestors." Caroline Siede of The A.V. Club gave the film a B and stated, "The novelty of watching the film's impressive female ensemble bounce off one another never wears off, even if Gunpowder Milkshake feels like it only ever scratches the surface of what each of its leads can do."

== Sequel ==
On April 30, 2021, Deadline Hollywood announced that The Picture Company and StudioCanal were working on a sequel. On July 6, 2021, StudioCanal confirmed during a special presentation for its 30th anniversary in Cannes that a sequel was being developed.
