= Chloe Coleman =

American actress (born 2008)

- Born: Chloe Chase Coleman; November 23, 2008 (age 17); Los Angeles, California, U.S.
- Occupation: Actress
- Years active: 2013–present

Chloe Chase Coleman (born November 23, 2008) is an American actress, best known for her role as Sophie on My Spy.

== Career ==
Coleman made her acting debut at the age of 5 in an episode of the Fox television series Glee in 2013. She was cast in January 2016 in the HBO limited series Big Little Lies, playing the daughter of the characters played by Zoë Kravitz and James Tupper. She would be nominated alongside the cast for the Screen Actors Guild Award for Outstanding Performance by an Ensemble in a Drama Series. In October 2018, Chloe was cast to star alongside Dave Bautista in My Spy. In 2019, she was cast in multiple films, including the thriller film Gunpowder Milkshake alongside Karen Gillan, in the romantic comedy Marry Me opposite Jennifer Lopez and Owen Wilson, and was listed as part of the cast for James Cameron's Avatar: The Way of Water. She began appearing in a recurring role in the television series Upload in 2020.

Her roles in 2023 include opposite Adam Driver in 65, with Chris Pine in the fantasy adventure film Dungeons & Dragons: Honor Among Thieves, and Pain Hustlers alongside Emily Blunt and Chris Evans. She reprised her role as Sophie in My Spy: The Eternal City, released in 2024.

In June 2026, Coleman was announced to join the cast of Joseph Gordon-Levitt's AI Thriller for Netflix.

== Personal life ==
Coleman's father is a camera operator and her mother a television producer. She has African-American and English ancestry through her father, and Czech ancestry through her mother.

== Filmography ==
Key
†	Denotes productions that have not yet been released

=== Film ===
Year	Title	Role	Notes
2020	My Spy	Sophie	
2020	Timmy Failure: Mistakes Were Made	Molly Moskins	
2021	Gunpowder Milkshake	Emily	
2022	Marry Me	Lou Gilbert	
2022	Avatar: The Way of Water	Young Lo'ak te Suli Tsyeyk'itan	
2023	65	Nevine	
2023	Dungeons & Dragons: Honor Among Thieves	Kira Darvis	
2023	Pain Hustlers	Phoebe Drake	
2024	My Spy: The Eternal City	Sophie	
2026	Mouse	Callie Bell	
2027	F.A.S.T. †	TBA	Post-production
TBA	2034 †	TBA	Post-production

=== Television ===
Year	Title	Role	Notes
2013	Glee	Young Dancer	1 episode
2016	Animals	Kid #1 (voice)	1 episode
2016	Transparent	Idit Ovadia	2 episodes
2016; 2017	Henry Danger	Scared Kid #2/Liz	2 episodes
2017	Superstore	Zoe	1 episode
2017–2019	Big Little Lies	Skye Carlson	Recurring role, 14 episodes Nominated - Screen Actors Guild Award for Outstanding Performance by an Ensemble in a Drama Series
2019; 2021	Puppy Dog Pals	Monet, Cubby (voice)	2 episodes
2020	The Resident	Lucy Williams	1 episode
2020–2021	Kinderwood	Fifi (voice)	Main role, 30 episodes
2020–2025	Upload	Nevaeh	Recurring role, 8 episodes
2021	Adventure Time: Distant Lands	Cadebra (voice)	1 episode
