= 65 (film) =

2023 American science fiction film

- Theatrical release poster
- Directed by: Scott Beck; Bryan Woods
- Written by: Scott Beck; Bryan Woods
- Produced by: Sam Raimi; Deborah Liebling; Zainab Azizi; Scott Beck; Bryan Woods
- Starring: Adam Driver; Ariana Greenblatt
- Cinematography: Salvatore Totino
- Edited by: Jane Tones; Josh Schaeffer
- Music by: Chris Bacon
- Production companies: Columbia Pictures; Bron Creative; Raimi Productions; Beck/Woods
- Distributed by: Sony Pictures Releasing
- Release date: March 10, 2023
- Running time: 93 minutes
- Country: United States
- Language: English
- Budget: $45 million
- Box office: $60.7 million

65 is a 2023 American science fiction film written and directed by Scott Beck and Bryan Woods. It stars Adam Driver as an ancient astronaut who crashes on prehistoric Earth filled with dinosaurs and other prehistoric creatures and attempts to help a young girl, played by Ariana Greenblatt, survive. Beck and Woods produced the film with Sam Raimi, Deborah Liebling, and Zainab Azizi.

Released in the United States by Sony Pictures Releasing under its Columbia Pictures label on March 10, 2023, the film grossed $60 million worldwide on a budget of $45 million, and received mixed reviews from critics.

== Plot ==
Sixty-five million years ago on the planet Somaris, space pilot Mills is convinced by his wife to take a two-year space expedition to earn money to treat their ill daughter, Nevine. His spaceship, the Zoic, is damaged in an asteroid storm and crash lands on an alien planet, Earth. Mills discovers that his passengers have been killed while in suspended animation. He contemplates suicide until he finds a lone survivor, a young girl named Koa. He sends a distress signal and decides to take care of her. They have difficulty communicating due to language differences and a faulty translator.

Mills discovers a functioning escape shuttle from the Zoic has landed on top of a mountain 15 kilometers away. To encourage Koa to follow him, he lies and tells her that her family is on the mountain. They quickly realize that Earth is inhabited by dangerous, aggressive alien creatures that are actually dinosaurs. During their journey, they rescue a small armored dinosaur stuck in a tar pit, which a pack of theropods then slaughters. Mills plummets from a tree and manages to fight off a pack of Lagosuchus attacking them.

Koa and Mills bond while spending the night in a cave. Koa views several video messages from Nevine. A large archosaur attacks, but Mills waylays it by shooting it in the eye before retreating with Koa further into the cave. They enter a narrow shaft but a rockfall separates them. Mills is trapped inside the cave, while Koa falls outside the cave system into the open jungle. She is attacked by a dromaeosaur, which she traps with a fallen tree before slaying it with bombs Mills gave her. Mills slaughters an Oviraptor that attacks him before escaping the cave, but falls into quicksand while searching for Koa. She rescues him and they continue up the mountain. However, Mills discovers that more asteroid debris will strike Earth in less than 12 hours.

When they reach the escape shuttle, Koa discovers that Mills lied to her about the deaths of her family. He apologizes and reveals to Koa that his daughter Nevine died from her illness while he was away. Mills promises to protect Koa. Upon learning that a rescue vessel will arrive soon, they board the escape shuttle, but the asteroid debris pushes it down the mountain. A pair of marauding Tyrannosaurus rex harasses them. Mills successfully kills both of them after Koa distracts them with a video projection of Nevine.

The archosaur that Mills blinded earlier suddenly appears from the jungle and pursues him. Mills lures it to a geyser, but the geyser only burns its face. Koa stabs it in its remaining eye with a large dinosaur tooth. The blinded carnivore stumbles headfirst into another geyser and is killed. Koa and Mills escape in the shuttle just as more asteroids strike Earth, causing the cataclysmic Cretaceous–Paleogene extinction event.

During the closing titles, the spot that Mills and Koa left is shown changing through several eras including an ice age, through the present day.

== Cast ==
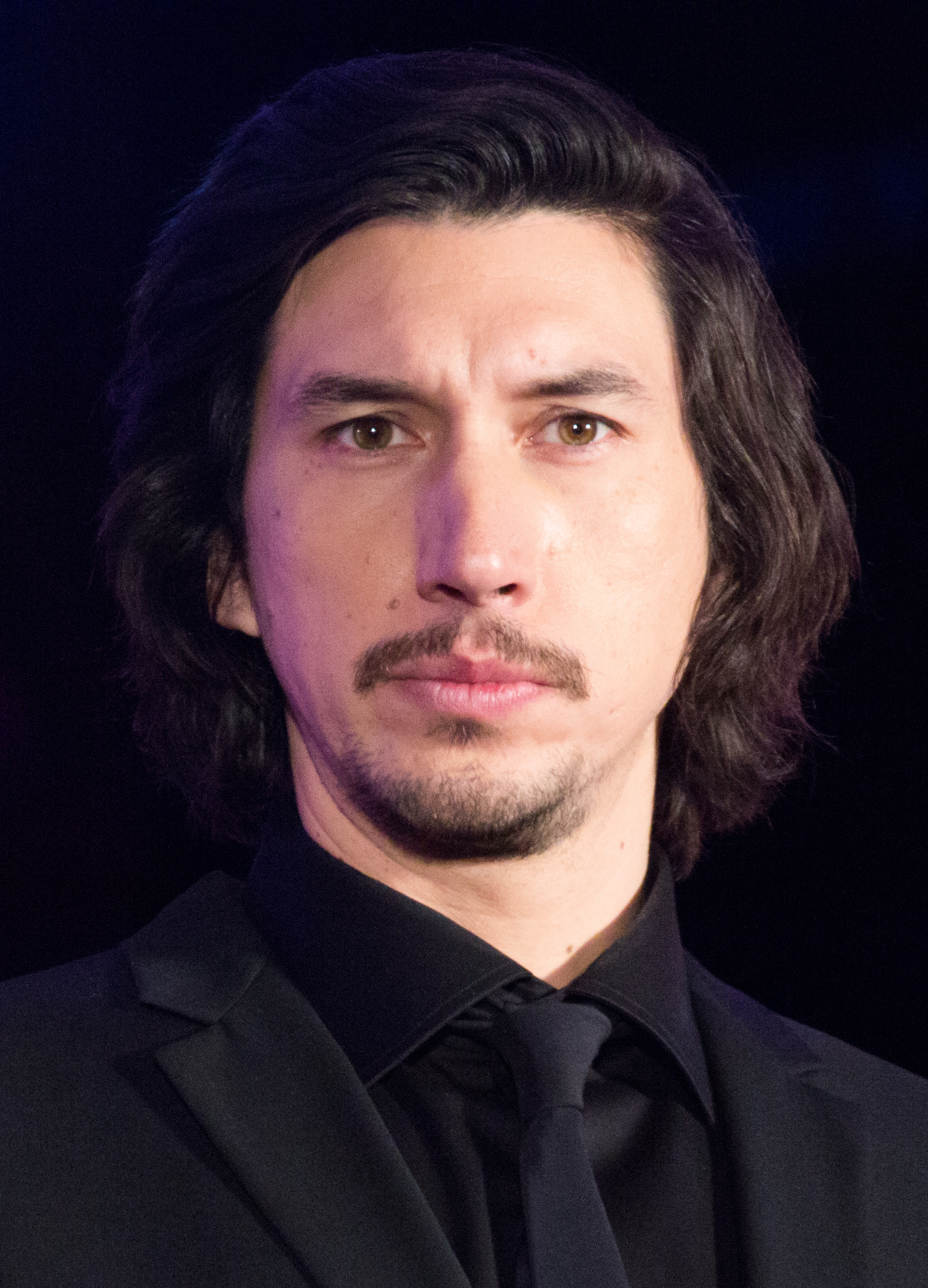
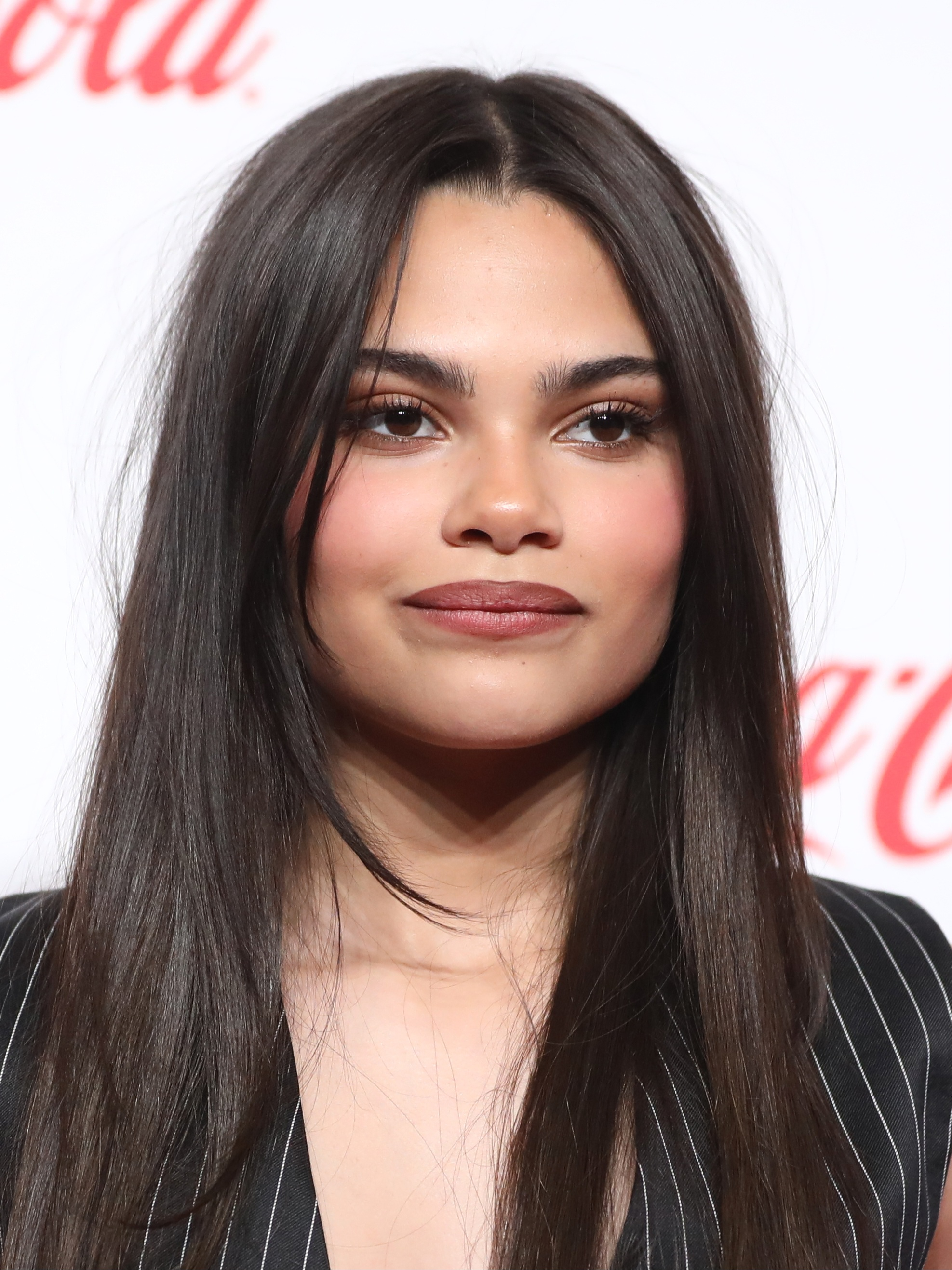
The film stars Adam Driver and Ariana Greenblatt as Mills and Koa respectively.
- Adam Driver as Mills
- Ariana Greenblatt as Koa
- Chloe Coleman as Nevine
- Nika King as Nevine's mom

== Production ==
In September 2020, Adam Driver signed on to star in the film, to be produced, written and directed by Scott Beck and Bryan Woods; Sam Raimi would co-produce with Zainab Azizi and Debbie Liebling. Later in the year, Ariana Greenblatt and Chloe Coleman joined the cast. Greenblatt learned to speak a fictional alien language created for the film. On a production budget of $45 million, principal photography began on December 7, 2020. Filming also occurred in the Kisatchie National Forest in Vernon Parish, Louisiana in January 2021, being halfway into production by January 16, and wrapping up on February 21, 2021. Several locations in Oregon were used for filming, including Meyer's Creek Beach in Gold Beach, Coos Bay, Whaleshead Beach in Brookings, Agness and Elk Creek Falls. Additional photography occurred in Ireland, sometime following the film's first release delay.

The visual effects were created by Framestore, and Ghost VFX with Chris Harvey serving as a visual effects supervisor. Scroggins Aviation Mockup & Effects was contracted by Sony to build a spacecraft "Escape Vessel" and other set props for the mother spacecraft in the film. The delayed release gave time for the visual effects to appear in more satisfactory quality. In February 2021, it was announced that Danny Elfman was composing the score for the film, having previously collaborated with Raimi on his directed projects. However, in March 2023, Chris Bacon, a frequent collaborator of Elfman, was revealed to have composed a new score earlier in the year; initially both composers were set to receive credit, but ultimately Bacon received sole credit, with Elfman labeled as a co-composer on select tracks. Additionally, Michael Giacchino served as "score consultant", while Gad Emile Zeitune is credited with "additional music".

== Release ==
65 was released theatrically in the United States on March 10, 2023, by Sony Pictures Releasing. The film had previously been scheduled for release, though with longer separation between announcement dates and release dates, for May 13, 2022, April 29, 2022, April 14, 2023, April 28, 2023, and March 17, 2023. The film was released digitally on April 7, followed by a Blu-ray, DVD, and 4K UHD release on May 30. As part of Sony's 18-month deal with Netflix, the film began streaming on the platform on July 8, 2023.

== Reception ==
=== Box office ===
65 grossed $32.1 million in the United States and Canada, and $28.6 million in other territories, for a worldwide total of $60.7 million.

In the United States and Canada, 65 was released alongside Scream VI and Champions, and was projected to gross $7–9 million from 3,350 theaters in its opening weekend. The film made $4.4 million on its first day, including $1.22 million from Thursday night previews. It went on to slightly over-perform, debuting to $12.3 million and finishing third at the box office. It made $5.8 million in its second weekend, finishing in third.

=== Critical response ===
On the review aggregator website Rotten Tomatoes, 36% of 128 critics' reviews are positive, with an average rating of 4.8/10. The website's consensus reads: "Sodden sci-fi that somehow finds a way to bungle Adam Driver fighting dinosaurs, 65 is closer to zero." Metacritic, which uses a weighted average, assigned the film a score of 40 out of 100, based on 27 critics, indicating "mixed or average" reviews. Audiences surveyed by CinemaScore gave the film an average grade of "C+" on an A+ to F scale, while those at PostTrak gave it an overall 54% positive score, with 37% saying they would recommend the film.

== See also ==
- List of films featuring dinosaurs
