= My Spy: The Eternal City =

2024 film directed by Pete Segal

- Release poster
- Directed by: Pete Segal
- Written by: Erich Hoeber; Jon Hoeber; Pete Segal
- Based on: Characters created by: Jon Hoeber; Erich Hoeber
- Produced by: Chris Bender; Pete Segal; Jake Weiner; Robert Simonds; Gigi Pritzker; Dave Bautista; Jonathan Meisner
- Starring: Dave Bautista; Chloe Coleman; Kristen Schaal; Flula Borg; Craig Robinson; Anna Faris; Ken Jeong
- Cinematography: Larry Blanford
- Edited by: Jason Gourson
- Music by: Sean Segal
- Production companies: STXfilms; Madison Wells Studios; Good Fear; Callahan Filmworks; Dogbone Entertainment
- Distributed by: Amazon MGM Studios
- Release date: July 18, 2024
- Running time: 113 minutes
- Country: United States
- Language: English

My Spy: The Eternal City is a 2024 American action comedy film directed by Pete Segal, who also co-wrote the screenplay with Jon and Eric Hoeber. A sequel to the 2020 film My Spy, it stars Dave Bautista, Chloe Coleman, Kristen Schaal, and Ken Jeong reprising their roles from the previous film, with Flula Borg, Craig Robinson, and Anna Faris joining the main cast.

My Spy: The Eternal City was released in the United States on July 18, 2024.

== Plot ==
JJ, now working a quiet desk job with the CIA and living in Virginia with his stepdaughter Sophie, is asked to chaperone her school choir trip to Italy. Sophie is 14 and growing tired of JJ’s constant supervision. She’s trying to impress her crush, Ryan, while her best friend Collin—who is also the son of JJ’s CIA boss—secretly has feelings for her.

Meanwhile, the CIA discovers that old Soviet nuclear bombs have resurfaced and may be connected to a plot involving a stolen hard drive and a threat against the Vatican. The situation escalates when Collin is kidnapped by a terrorist named Crane, forcing JJ, Sophie, CIA analyst Bobbi, and Collin’s father David Kim to chase the villains across Italy—from Venice to Rome.

The group works together to recover the hard drive, rescue Collin, and stop the attack. Along the way, Sophie matures and starts to understand JJ’s protectiveness, while JJ proves he’s not just a tough guy, but a caring parent. In the end, the mission succeeds, relationships grow stronger, and Sophie begins a budding romance with Collin.

== Cast ==
- Dave Bautista as CIA Agent J.J.
- Chloe Coleman as Sophie
- Kristen Schaal as Bobbi
- Ken Jeong as CIA Station Chief David Kim
- Anna Faris as Nancy
- Flula Borg as Crane
- Taeho K as Collin
- Billy Barratt as Ryan Kerr
- Craig Robinson as Connelly
- Nicola Correia-Damude as CIA Agent Christina
- Devere Rogers as Carlos
- Noah Danby as Todd

== Production ==
Amazon MGM Studios and STXfilms began exploring a sequel to the 2020 film in August 2020, after its success on Amazon Prime Video. The film was confirmed in February 2023, with Pete Segal returning to direct and Dave Bautista, Chloe Coleman, Kristen Schaal, and Ken Jeong reprising their roles. Anna Faris, Craig Robinson, and Flula Borg would also join the cast, with production beginning that month. Filming concluded in Venice in May of that same year.

== Release ==
My Spy: The Eternal City was released in the United States via streaming on Prime Video by Amazon MGM Studios on July 18, 2024.

== Reception ==
On the review aggregator website Rotten Tomatoes, 23% of 39 critics' reviews are positive, with an average rating of 4.8/10. The website's consensus reads: "Wasting Dave Bautista's crack comedic timing on a leaden script, this My Spy sequel is a mission failure." Metacritic, which uses a weighted average, assigned the film a score of 36 out of 100, based on 12 critics, indicating "generally unfavorable" reviews.
