= Peter Segal =

American film director (born 1962)

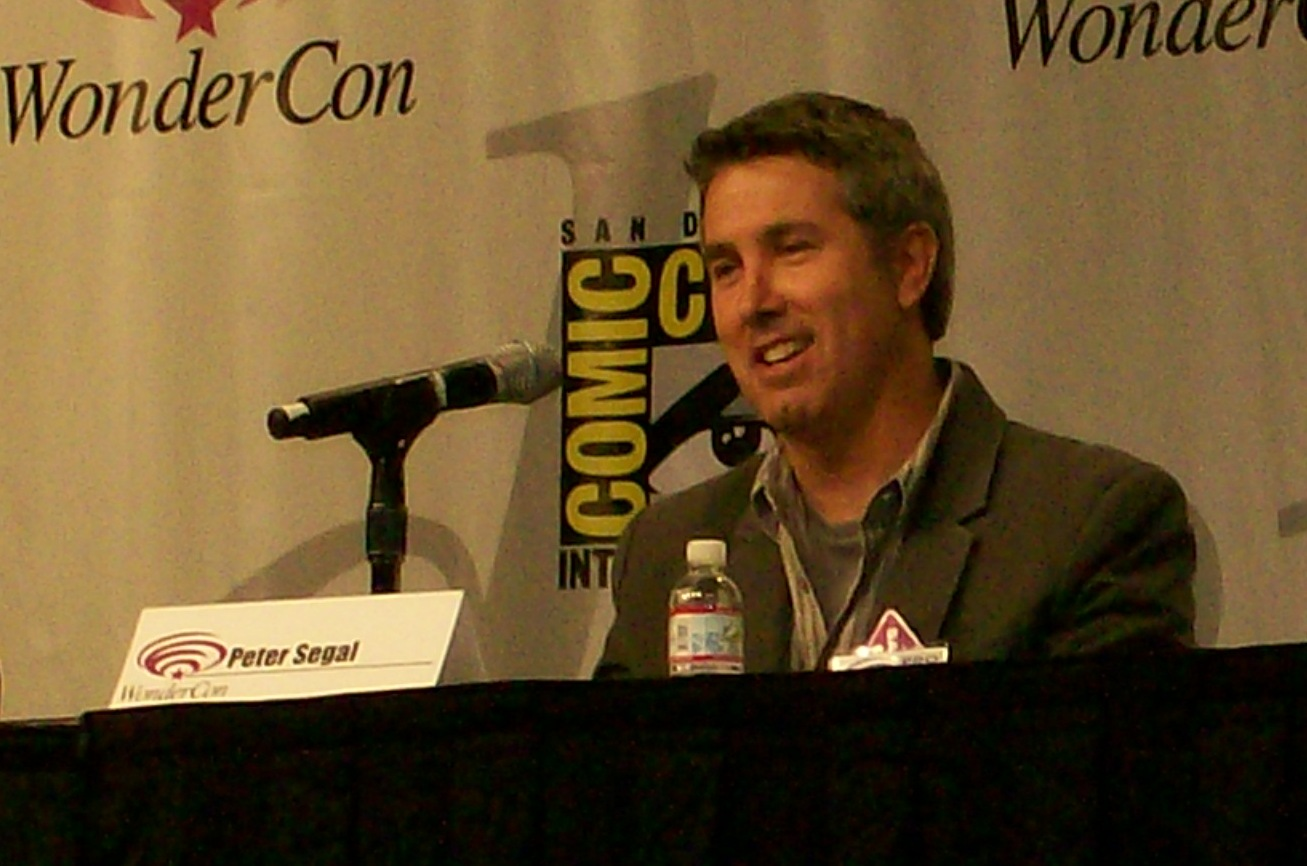
- Segal promoting Get Smart at the 2008 WonderCon at the Moscone Center in San Francisco
- Born: 1962 (age 63–64); United States
- Occupations: Film director; screenwriter
- Years active: 1991–present
- Spouse: Linda Brogmus

Peter Segal (born 1962) is an American film director, producer, screenwriter, and actor. He directed the comedic films Naked Gun 33 1/3: The Final Insult (1994), Tommy Boy (1995), My Fellow Americans (1996), The Nutty Professor II: The Klumps (2000), Anger Management (2003), 50 First Dates (2004), The Longest Yard (2005), Get Smart (2008), Grudge Match (2013), and My Spy (2020).

== Early life and education ==
Segal grew up in New York City where his father was head of publicity at MGM. In the 1970s, he and his family moved to Los Angeles. He attended the University of Southern California in Los Angeles, where he double majored in broadcast journalism and English.

Peter Segal graduated from the USC School of Cinema and Television.

== Career ==
Segal began his career writing and directing television. In 2002, he created the NBC sitcom Hidden Hills (2002–2003). In 1995, he formed his production company, Callahan Filmworks, along with long-time producing partner Michael Ewing. Segal made his feature film directorial debut in 1994 with Naked Gun 33 1/3: The Final Insult, starring Leslie Nielsen and George Kennedy. Segal directed Chris Farley and David Spade in Tommy Boy (1995). Although it received mixed reviews at the time of release and was considered a commercial disappointment, Tommy Boy's reputation has grown over the years and it is considered in some quarters a "now-iconic cult classic."

Segal directed the comedy film My Fellow Americans (1996), starring Jack Lemmon, James Garner, and Lauren Bacall. The film received mixed reviews from critics. It holds a 47% rating on Rotten Tomatoes based on 60 reviews and with an average rating of 5.3/10: "It doesn't commit any impeachable offences, but My Fellow Americans lacks strong regulatory oversight of its toothless political satire and misuse of comedic talent." Co-star Garner was not impressed by Segal, writing in his memoirs that Segal "was a self appointed genius who didn't know his ass from second base and Jack and I both knew it."

Segal next directed the comedy Nutty Professor II: The Klumps (2000), starring Eddie Murphy. The film was very successful, grossing $42.5 million in its opening weekend, the then-highest opening weekend for an Eddie Murphy film. The film grossed $166.3 million worldwide. Critically, however, the film did not fare as well: on Rotten Tomatoes, the film has an approval rating of 27% and an average rating of 4.5/10, based on reviews from 89 critics. The site's review says, "While Eddie Murphy is still hilarious as the entire Klump family, the movie falls apart because of uneven pacing, a poor script, and skits that rely on being gross rather than funny." On Metacritic, the film has a score of 38 out of 100, a score which indicates a generally unfavourable response based on reviews from 34 critics.

Segal directed Adam Sandler for the first time in Anger Management (2003), which also starred Jack Nicholson. When asked by the BBC who was the most famous person in his contacts, Segal replied, "I have to say, it's very obvious now, it's Jack Nicholson. I've kept his number on my speed dial just so I can show it to friends. I could call him up out of the blue, but I'm worried he might say 'Pete who?'" Segal collaborated with Sandler in 50 First Dates (2004) which starred Drew Barrymore. Segal collaborated with Sandler for the third time in The Longest Yard (2005), a remake of the 1974 film of the same name. The film became the second highest grossing sports comedy in history.

After directing three of Sandler's films, Segal's next film was Get Smart (2008). It is an adaptation of the '60s television series of the same name which was created by Mel Brooks and Buck Henry. Segal said in an interview with AMC that he loved the show so much as a kid. The film starred Steve Carell, Anne Hathaway, Dwayne Johnson, Alan Arkin, and Terence Stamp. Segal also directed Grudge Match (2013), which starred Robert De Niro, Sylvester Stallone, Kevin Hart, Alan Arkin, Kim Basinger, and Jon Bernthal.

== Personal life ==
When asked in a September 2014 interview by the BBC if he believes in God, Segal replied, "I do. I'm very spiritual and I'm Jewish by faith. I'm not a practicing Jew, I'm more of a recreational Jew. I celebrate the holidays and I try to inform my kids about their heritage because I think we all at some point have to defend our heritage and if they get picked on I want them to know why."

== Filmography ==
=== Film ===
Year	Title	Director	Producer
1994	Naked Gun 33 1/3: The Final Insult	Yes	No
1995	Tommy Boy	Yes	No
1996	My Fellow Americans	Yes	No
2000	Nutty Professor II: The Klumps	Yes	No
2003	Anger Management	Yes	No
2004	50 First Dates	Yes	No
2005	The Longest Yard	Yes	No
2008	Get Smart	Yes	Executive
2013	Grudge Match	Yes	Yes
2018	Second Act	Yes	Executive
2020	My Spy	Yes	Yes
2024	My Spy: The Eternal City	Yes	Yes

Acting credits

Year	Title	Role
1994	Naked Gun 33 1/3: The Final Insult	#1 Producer of 'Sawdust & Mildew'
1996	My Fellow Americans	TV Technician
2000	Nutty Professor II: The Klumps	Scared Popcorn Man

=== Television ===
Year	Title	Director	Producer	Writer	Notes
1987	Bikini II: The Saga Continues	Yes	Yes	Yes	TV short
1993	The Jackie Thomas Show	Yes	Yes	No	Episodes "Write This Way" and "Aloha, Io-wahu"
2002–2003	Hidden Hills	No	Executive	Yes	Also creator; wrote episode "Pilot"
2014–2016	Shameless	Yes	No	No	Episodes "Strangers on a Train", "The Two Lisas" and "Pimp's Paradise"
2014–2016	Survivor's Remorse	Yes	No	No	Episodes "How to Build a Brand", "Grown-Ass Man", "Starts and Stops" and "The Night of the Crash"
2016	Angie Tribeca	Yes	No	No	Episode "Commissioner Bigfish"
2021	Heels	Yes	Executive	No	Directed 7 episodes

TV movies

Year	Title	Director	Producer	Writer
1989	Premiere: Inside the Summer Blockbusters	Uncredited	Contributing	No
1992	The Road Warriors	Yes	Executive	No
2010	In Security	Yes	Executive	Yes
2012	Prodigy Bully	Yes	Executive	No
2015	Ken Jeong Made Me Do It	Yes	Executive	No

TV specials

Year	Title	Director	Producer	Writer
1991	Tom Arnold: The Naked Truth	Yes	Yes	No
1992	Tom Arnold: The Naked Truth 2	Yes	Yes	Yes
1993	Tom Arnold: The Naked Truth 3	Yes	Yes	Yes
2022	Sebastian Maniscalco: Is It Me?	Yes	No	No
