= My Spy =

2020 film by Peter Segal

- Official release poster
- Directed by: Peter Segal
- Written by: Jon Hoeber; Erich Hoeber
- Produced by: Chris Bender; Peter Segal; Jake Weiner; Robert Simonds; Gigi Pritzker; Dave Bautista; Jonathan Meisner
- Starring: Dave Bautista; Chloe Coleman; Kristen Schaal; Parisa Fitz-Henley; Ken Jeong
- Cinematography: Larry Blanford
- Edited by: Jason Gourson
- Music by: Dominic Lewis
- Production companies: STXfilms; MWM Studios
- Distributed by: Amazon Studios (United States); STX Entertainment (international)
- Release dates: January 9, 2020 (Australia); June 26, 2020 (United States)
- Running time: 99 minutes
- Country: United States
- Language: English
- Budget: $18 million
- Box office: $10.5 million

My Spy is a 2020 American action comedy film produced and directed by Peter Segal from a script by Jon and Erich Hoeber. It stars Dave Bautista, Chloe Coleman in her film debut, Kristen Schaal, Parisa Fitz-Henley, and Ken Jeong. It follows a CIA agent who finds himself at the mercy of a precocious nine-year-old girl in a family that he and his tech support are surveilling while undercover.

My Spy was released theatrically on January 9, 2020 in Australia by STX Entertainment. On April 8, 2020, its distribution rights were purchased by Amazon Studios due to the COVID-19 pandemic having shut down theaters worldwide. It was released digitally on Amazon Prime Video and in select U.S. theatres on June 26, 2020, to mixed reviews. A sequel, The Eternal City, was released in July 2024.

== Plot ==
JJ is a former Army Ranger newly hired as a CIA operative. However, his lack of subtlety causes him to blow his first major mission: busting an illegal weapons-grade plutonium trade in Pripyat between the Russian mafia and Hassan, a Middle East terrorist.

Despite this, his boss David Kim assigns JJ and tech operator Bobbi, who hero-worships JJ, to keep an eye on the in-law family of Victor Marquez, a French illegal arms dealer who has obtained construction plans for a miniaturized nuclear bomb which he intends to sell to Hassan.

Victor lost these plans to his brother David, who hid them before Victor murdered him. Kim suspects they may be with David's American wife Kate and their 9-year-old daughter Sophie, who moved from France back to Wicker Park, Chicago after his death.

JJ and Bobbi move into the building where Kate and Sophie live, and set up their surveillance. However, Sophie soon finds one of their hidden cameras, backtracks its signal and stumbles upon the operation post. Confronting JJ and Bobbi, she blackmails JJ into keeping her company while she tries to fit into an American kid's life and make some new friends at her school Oaktree Charter School.

Despite JJ's social awkwardness, the two slowly begin to bond, and JJ also becomes acquainted with Kate and her neighbors Carlos and Todd. Sophie has JJ train her in the basics of the espionage trade, and brings him and her mother closer together.

However, Kim eventually finds out about JJ's personal involvement with his targets and takes him and Bobbi off the mission. JJ reveals his assignment to Kate, who rejects him in disgust. At the same time, Victor discovers and counteracts the CIA's surveillance and coerces his lawyer Koll into revealing where David might have hidden the plans.

After faking his own death, Victor travels to Chicago, confronts Kate, JJ, and Sophie and retrieves the plans. Carlos and Todd burst in and intervene, revealing themselves as independent arms dealers who are also after the plans. Bobbi's clumsy attempt to help results in Victor escaping with the plans and Sophie as his hostage.

JJ and Kate pursue Victor to an airfield in Naperville, where JJ grounds Victor's escape plane and starts a fistfight with him. In her attempt to escape, Sophie accidentally sets the plane in motion, leaving it hanging at the edge of a cliff on some wire fencing. Victor forces Sophie, who has hidden the real plans, to surrender them. Before he can shoot them, Kate clubs him onto the fence and JJ pushes the plane off the cliff, sending Victor to his death.

After being reinstated by Kim for his success, JJ has himself permanently assigned to Chicago, where he moves in with Kate and Sophie.

== Cast ==
- Dave Bautista as CIA Agent J.J., a CIA agent tasked with surveilling Sophie's mother in hopes of locating her criminal brother-in-law
- Chloe Coleman as Sophie, a nine-year-old elementary school girl who blackmails J.J. into training her to be a spy
- Kristen Schaal as Bobbi, J.J.'s tech specialist
- Parisa Fitz-Henley as Kate, Sophie's mother
- Ken Jeong as CIA Station Chief David Kim, J.J.'s boss at the CIA
- Devere Rogers as Carlos, Sophie's gay neighbor
- Greg Bryk as Victor Marquez
- Ali Hassan as Azar
- Noah Danby as Todd, Carlos' partner
- Nicola Correia-Damude as CIA Agent Christina, J.J.'s fellow agent at the CIA

== Production ==
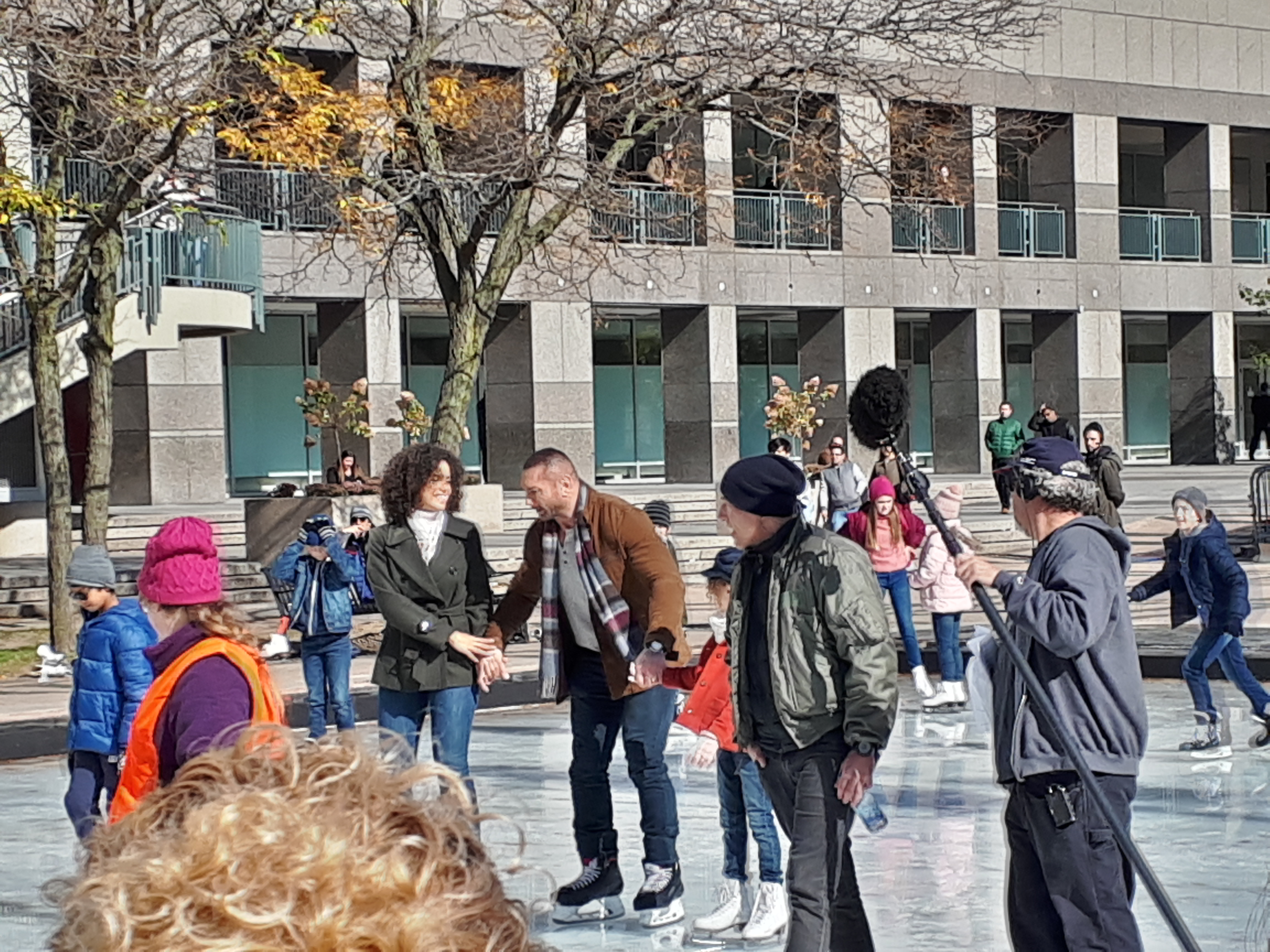
Filming at Mel Lastman Square in October 2018.

On October 5, 2017, it was reported that STX Entertainment had finalized a deal to develop a then-untitled action-comedy film starring Dave Bautista. Bautista was also expected to produce the film with Jonathan Meisner, with Drew Simon overseeing the project for the studio.

On July 30, 2018, it was announced that the first film in the planned series, now titled My Spy, would be directed by Peter Segal from a screenplay by Jon and Erich Hoeber. In October 2018, it was announced that Ken Jeong, Parisa Fitz-Henley, Chloe Coleman and Kristen Schaal had joined the cast. It was also announced that Segal, Chris Bender, Jake Weiner, and Gigi Pritzker would be the producers; the Hoebers, Michael Flynn, Rachel Shane, and Adrian Alperovich would executive-produce; and Stacy Calabrese would be a co-producer. MWM Studios also joined the film as an additional production company.

Principal photography commenced on October 15, 2018 in Toronto, Ontario, Canada, and concluded on November 30. The skating sequence was shot at Mel Lastman Square, and the runway sequence at Markham Airport.

== Release ==
The film was originally scheduled for a theatrical release on August 23, 2019, but it was pushed back to an undisclosed 2020 date on July 10, 2019. After then being set for a January release and moved, it was pushed back yet again on March 7 (just a week before its scheduled March 13 release) to April 17. It was then pulled from the schedule due to movie theater closures since mid-March because of the COVID-19 pandemic restrictions.

On April 8, 2020, Amazon Studios acquired the film's distribution rights. It was released digitally on Amazon Prime Video, as well as in select Cineplex Entertainment and Landmark Cinemas, and drive-in theaters, on June 26, 2020. It made an estimated $107,000 from 104 theaters in its second weekend of domestic release (for a North American running total of $307,000). In November, Variety reported it was the third-most watched straight-to-streaming title of 2020 up to that point.

It was released on January 9, 2020 in Australia. Despite the COVID-19 pandemic in the United Kingdom, it was released in the UK on March 13, 2020 without any alteration.

=== Home media ===
My Spy was released on DVD and Blu-ray on October 27, 2020 in Canada.

== Reception ==
On review aggregator website Rotten Tomatoes, the film holds an approval rating of 49% based on 127 reviews, with an average rating of 5/10. The site's critics consensus reads, "My Spy plugs Dave Bautista into the 'charismatic action star meets cute kid' formula, with generally painless albeit decidedly mediocre results." On Metacritic the film has a weighted average score of 46 out of 100, based on 20 critics, indicating "mixed or average reviews".

Ben Travis of Empire magazine gave the film 2 out of 5, and wrote: "This big-spy-meets-little-kid comedy isn't funny enough for teens, but not really suitable for younger viewers either." Kate Erbland of IndieWire gave the film a "C−" and wrote: "Saddled with a baffling PG-13 rating — the film's violence is muted, but a decision was made to throw in frequent profanity, plus the repetitive use of an un-edited version of Cardi B's 'I Like It' — My Spy seems destined to both alienate kids and turn off adults."

Writing for Variety, Richard Kuipers called it a "mildly amusing family comedy" and said that Segal "generates an amiable atmosphere in domestic scenes and gets solid performances from a cast that's given some good and some not-so-good material to work with."

== Sequel ==
In August 2020, it was announced that Amazon and STX were in discussions for a sequel, with the intention of Segal and the cast all returning. In January 2023, Bautista confirmed that a sequel was being filmed, with filming taking place in South Africa and Italy. The sequel, called My Spy: The Eternal City, was released in 2024.
