= Ivans Haritonovs =

Latvian-Russian boxer and criminal (born 1954)

- Иван Харитонов
- Born: April 27, 1954 (age 72); Monino, Moscow Oblast, Russian SFSR, Soviet Union
- Occupations: Boxer, criminal
- Criminal charges: Extortion

Ivans Haritonovs (Russian: Иван Харитонов, romanized: Ivan Kharitonov; born 27 April 1954, in Monino, Moscow Oblast, then Russian SFSR) is a former Latvian Russian boxer and criminal, founder of the informally known organized crime "Kharitonov group". In 1998, he was convicted of extortion in an organized group and was referred to in the press as a "legend of the criminal underworld."

== Biography ==
Ivans Haritonovs was born in the village of Monino, Moscow Oblast, Soviet Union. He moved to Riga (Latvian SSR) when he was still an infant, and his father worked for the KGB. There he began boxing training at the age of 11 under veteran coach Ivars Zunde. Zunde later recalled, "There was a fighter's spirit in that fragile boy!" Haritonovs trained with Zunde for several years, achieving success in the All-Union sports club "Labor Reserves" competitions.

As a teenager, Haritonovs was convicted for a fight at a disco involving the son of a prominent port official. He faced charges of aggravated hooliganism. His coach intervened in court proceedings, arguing that the trial might be biased. The court found that the victim had been intoxicated and instigated the conflict. Haritonovs received a suspended three-year sentence. This incident nearly ended his boxing aspirations.

In 1973, Haritonovs attempted to enter the Latvian State Institute of Physical Culture (LVFKI) but failed the entrance exam. With help from his coach and acquaintances, he was admitted as an auditor. About six months later, he was convicted in another case and sentenced to eight years. Zunde later said that systemic failure and social conditions pushed Haritonovs toward crime.

=== Crimes and conviction ===
By the early 1990s, Haritonovs had three convictions for hooliganism. He and associate Gennady Valyagin (shot in 2022) co-founded the company "Brih," directed by Grigory Bobovich (Григорий Бобович) who was an Israeli citizen. The company dealt in oil product business and owed the state 168,000 Latvian lats in unpaid taxes. Bobovich fled to Sweden, which refused extradition due to his new Swedish citizenship. Haritonovs also owned companies such as "Tess AB", "Nova Lada", and "AVV".

On 27 April 1994, his 40th birthday, Haritonovs was arrested on extortion charges. Then–Prosecutor General Jānis Skrastiņš dubbed him the "king of racketeering." Shortly afterward, Riga City Council member Juris Dobelis and others petitioned for his release, earning Dobelis the nickname "Haritonov's mailman."

A month later, Vladimir Dukat, president of the company "Dukat," was killed in a remote-controlled car bombing. He had testified against Haritonov’s associate Aleksandr Kisel and restaurant owner Karol Lesinski.

After an appeal, Haritonov’s case was retried. He and six others (including Valyagin, Aleksandrs Korobeiko, and Ruslans Burlajs) stood trial, while six more were fugitives. A key witness, Gennady Tovantsev, had once been in debt for $2 million and turned to Interior Minister Ziedonis Čevers for help. In 1994, Tovantsev was arrested for extortion but later testified against Haritonovs. He claimed the real enforcer was Viktor Shestakov, known as "Kleshch" (Russian: "Tick"), who demanded $10,000 monthly plus a cut from loans. The court found the group guilty of organized extortion and maintaining a collective fund.

In 1997, Haritonovs was found guilty of one extortion case involving Dukat, falsifying testimony, and forging documents to acquire Latvian citizenship. He was released for time already served.

On 29 May 1998, the Supreme Court of Latvia convicted Haritonovs, Valyagin, Korobeiko, and Burlajs of organized extortion and ordered asset confiscation. However, Haritonovs had no property in his name. Assets were registered to relatives and associates. The criminal case spanned over 20 volumes, and the indictment was 150 pages long.

Haritonov always maintained close ties with Russia, primarily with the Solntsevo criminal group (Solntsevskaya Bratva). After Haritonov's arrest, his authorized representative at large became Valery Berlin (Tsygan), who stopped sharing with the Solntsevo group. Berlin was killed in an explosion in January 2000, in Imanta. Four months later, another former comrade of Haritonov, Viktors Balulis, nicknamed Animal, was shot in the Netherlands.

Korobeiko committed suicide in prison, and others were gradually released. While incarcerated, Haritonovs learned Latvian, basic computer skills, read books, and exercised.

== Post-release ==
Haritonovs was released on 10 May 2001 after serving three-quarters of his sentence. He founded a boxing center, sponsored competitions, and ran the "Latvian Boxing Center" sports club in Olaine. He attended the New Wave music competition in Jūrmala and the WFCA – Fight Arena: Latvia vs. Russia MMA event.

In 2019, Haritonov’s name surfaced again in connection with an illegal cigarette trafficking ring at Riga Central Market.

== See also ==
- The wild nineties
- Solntsevskaya Bratva
- Organized crime in Latvia
- Organized crime in Estonia
- Obshchak
