= Organised crime in Latvia =

Organised crime in Latvia refers to criminal activities carried out by structured groups operating in the country, particularly since the collapse of the Soviet Union. The phenomenon has evolved over time, influenced by geopolitical shifts, economic liberalization, and Latvia's position as a strategic transit point between East and West.

According to the Global Organized Crime Index 2023, Latvia scored 3.90, similar to Lithuania, Canada, Norway.

== Background ==
The collapse of the Soviet Union and the subsequent independence of the Baltic States in the early 1990s significantly influenced the formation and evolution of organised crime in the region. While Estonia, Latvia, and Lithuania each experienced distinct developments, Latvia's trajectory was shaped heavily by its sizable Russian-speaking population and slower restructuring process.

During the Soviet period, organised crime in Latvia was relatively suppressed under strict state control and surveillance. However, with the dissolution of the USSR in 1991 and the transition to a market economy, Latvia experienced a significant power vacuum in law enforcement and governance. This allowed various criminal groups—often composed of former convicts, ex-military personnel, and opportunistic entrepreneurs—to flourish in the early 1990s.

Russian-speaking organised crime groups were particularly active during this period. They capitalised on the privatisation of state assets, engaged in racketeering, smuggling, and extortion, and often infiltrated legitimate businesses. Some groups maintained connections with the Russian mafia and used Latvia as a base for operations in the Baltics and beyond.

According to criminologist Dr. Paddy Rawlinson of the London School of Economics, Latvia’s organised crime scene in the 1990s was influenced by close ties between ethnic Russians in Riga and the emerging economic elite in Moscow—termed the "second wave" of criminal entrepreneurs. This group played a key role in embedding criminal interests within the developing financial sector.

Key figures from this period included the Aleksandr Lavent and Vladimir Leskov families, both linked to Russian mafia leader Vyacheslav Ivankov ("Yaponchik"). They were involved in early banking ventures—most notably Banka Baltija and Bank Olympia—amid allegations of fraud and illicit capital flows. The Latvian underworld also saw the rise of Ivans Haritonovs (sometimes referred to as the "godfather" of Latvian organized crime) and Boris Raigorodski, who headed the Pārdaugava brigade.

Latvian organised crime networks often used front organisations such as sports associations (especially boxing) to develop protection rackets and legitimate business ventures. By the late 1990s and 2000s, corruption, money laundering, drug trafficking, and smuggling had become entrenched problems. International reports, including those by the U.S. Department of State and Jane’s Intelligence Review, repeatedly identified Latvia as a major center for money laundering.

Despite efforts to counteract corruption—such as the establishment of an anti-corruption program in 1999—organized crime had already infiltrated political and economic structures, contributing to systemic governance issues. These problems were further exposed during 2008 Latvian financial crisis, which triggered widespread unrest and highlighted the long-term impact of unchecked corruption and criminal integration into the legitimate economy.

== Notable groups ==
=== The Kharitonov Group ===
One of the most prominent crime syndicates of the early post-Soviet period was led by Ivans Haritonovs (also known as "Khariton"). Born in Monino, near Moscow, and raised in Latvia, Kharitonov had a criminal record dating back to the 1970s. After serving multiple prison sentences, he emerged as a crime boss in Riga, where his group established control over various commercial enterprises, particularly in fuel trading and protection rackets.

Kharitonov's organization—sometimes referred to by the acronym BRIH ("Brigade of Ivan Kharitonov")—was known for its structured hierarchy and alleged involvement in extortion, kidnapping, and murder. The group operated businesses with ties to Russia and employed both physical coercion and financial influence to expand their reach. Religious figures, such as a local Orthodox priest Alexei Zotov (Алексей Зотов), were also reportedly associated with the group, contributing to its public image and network of influence.

In 1994, Latvian law enforcement launched what was considered one of the most successful operations against organized crime at the time, targeting Kharitonov and his associates. Several key members were arrested and tried on charges ranging from extortion to hostage-taking. However, the case was complicated by the disappearance or deaths of numerous witnesses and alleged victims. Many of those classified as victims were themselves involved in criminal or dubious commercial activities.

=== Other groups ===
Other notable groups operating during the same era included the Raigorodsky group, also known as "Pārdaugava," which exerted control over commercial sectors in Jurmala and nearby resort towns. A third faction, led by Janis Kalva (nicknamed "Klops"), was known for more violent and erratic behavior. Rivalries occasionally led to turf conflicts, although many disputes were settled through negotiations or by dividing territories.

== Law enforcement response ==
Following Latvia’s independence, the capacity of its police and judicial system was initially limited. Corruption, understaffing, and lack of expertise hampered early efforts. However, over time—with international cooperation and internal reform—Latvia significantly improved its ability to combat organized crime. High-profile arrests in the 1990s, including the dismantling of the Kharitonov group, marked a turning point in the state’s approach.

By the late 1990s and early 2000s, increased scrutiny from the European Union (especially during Latvia’s accession process) led to reforms in financial regulation and law enforcement cooperation. The number of contract killings dropped significantly, and overt gang violence became rarer.

== Current situation ==
While organized crime still exists in Latvia, it has evolved into less visible forms. Modern groups are often involved in cybercrime, fraud, illegal gambling, and trafficking, with fewer public displays of violence. Latvian organized crime groups are believed to maintain links with other criminal networks in Russia, Ukraine, and Western Europe.

Latvia’s membership in the European Union and NATO has facilitated cross-border law enforcement cooperation, though the country remains a target for money laundering and illicit trade due to its geographic position and port infrastructure.

== See also ==
- Crime in Latvia
- The wild nineties
- Solntsevskaya Bratva
- Organized crime in Estonia
- Obshchak
