= Pen15 =

American comedy TV series

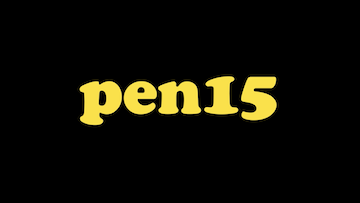
- Genre: Cringe comedy
- Created by: Maya Erskine; Anna Konkle; Sam Zvibleman
- Showrunners: Maya Erskine; Anna Konkle; Sam Zvibleman; Gabe Liedman
- Starring: Maya Erskine; Anna Konkle; Mutsuko Erskine; Richard Karn; Taylor Nichols; Melora Walters; Taj Cross; Dallas Liu
- Opening theme: "Demirep" by Bikini Kill
- Composer: Leo Birenberg
- Country of origin: United States
- Original language: English
- No. of seasons: 2
- No. of episodes: 25

Production
- Executive producers: Maya Erskine; Anna Konkle; Sam Zvibleman; Debbie Liebling; Gabe Liedman; Marc Provissiero; Brooke Pobjoy; Andy Samberg; Jorma Taccone; Akiva Schaffer; Becky Sloviter; Shelley Zimmerman; Brin Lukens; Jordan Levin
- Producers: Jeremy Reitz; Don Dunn; Scott Levine
- Cinematography: Andy Rydzewski
- Editors: Matt McBrayer; Taichi Erskine; Amelia Allwarden
- Running time: 26–36 minutes; 40 minutes (series finale)
- Production companies: Lonely Island Classics; Odenkirk Provissiero Entertainment; AwesomenessTV; Drama Leo (season 2); Damma Entertainment (season 2); Family Version (season 2)

Original release
- Network: Hulu
- Release: February 8, 2019 – December 3, 2021

Pen15 is an American cringe comedy television series, created by Maya Erskine, Anna Konkle, and Sam Zvibleman, that premiered on February 8, 2019, on Hulu. The series stars Erskine and Konkle, who also serve as executive producers alongside Zvibleman, Andy Samberg, Akiva Schaffer, Jorma Taccone, Becky Sloviter, Marc Provissiero, Brooke Pobjoy, Debbie Liebling, and Gabe Liedman.

In May 2019, Hulu renewed the series for a second season of fifteen episodes, the first half of which premiered on September 18, 2020. In November 2021, it was reported that the series' second season would be its last.

Pen15 is described as "middle school as it really happened". Erskine and Konkle – who were both 31 years old at the start of season one – "play versions of themselves as 13-year-old social outcasts in the year 2000, surrounded by actual 13-year-olds, where the best day of your life can turn into your worst with the stroke of a gel pen." The show takes its name from a school prank involving tricking someone into writing the word "PEN15" (which looks like the word "penis") on their hands by asking if they want to join the "Pen 15 Club".

== Cast and characters ==
=== Main ===
- Maya Erskine as Maya Ishii-Peters, a shy and sensitive seventh-grader who is best friends with Anna and is primarily raised by her Japanese mother. Maya can be immature and spontaneous at times, but she makes friends with her class clown behavior.
- Anna Konkle as Anna Kone, a seventh-grader girl who is best friends with Maya and struggling with her parents' divorce. Anna is the school's best singer and often copes with her home life with music. Anna is more mature than Maya, but also more likely to give in to peer pressure.
- Mutsuko Erskine as Yuki Ishii-Peters, Maya's stern but caring mother. She is Erskine's mother in real life.
- Richard Karn as Fred Peters, Maya's musician father who is often on tour with his Steely Dan cover band.
- Taylor Nichols as Curtis Kone, Anna's father, whom she occasionally finds sleeping on the couch after a fight with his wife.
- Melora Walters as Kathy Kone, Anna's mother, whose New Age spirituality and high-strung personality clash with her husband.
- Taj Cross as Sam Zablowski, a carpool friend of both leads who develops a crush on Maya.
- Dallas Liu as Shuji Ishii-Peters, Maya's older brother and sometimes defender, who tries to be cool and is often seen smoking cannabis outside school.

=== Recurring ===
- Dylan Gage as Gabe Leib
- Sami Rappoport as Becca
- Anna Pniowsky as Heather Taylor
- Ivan Mallon as Ian Walsh
- Hannah Mae as Connie M
- Tony Espinosa as Jafeer
- Brady Allen as Brendan Tooler
- Jill Basey as Ms. Bell
- Lincoln Jolly as Alex
- Brandon Keener as Mr. O
- Allius Barnes as Evan
- Marion Van Cuyck as Terra Newback
- Jessica Pressley as Jessica Abrams
- David Bowe as Albert
- Diane Delano as Jan
- Jonah Beres as Brandt
- Nathaniel Matulessya as Skyler
- Katie Silverman as Stevie
- Brekkan Spens as Ben Field
- Bernadette Guckin as Mrs. Tooler
- Tim Russ as Mr. Wyzell
- Isaac Edwards as Dustin
- Jennifer Steadman as Suze
- Carmina Garay as Jenna
- Ashlee Grubbs as Maura
- Sara Boustany as Miranda
- Rebecca Faye Vincent as Marissa H
- Chau Long as Steve
- Albert Howell as Principal Ravage
- Brandon Soo Hoo as Andy Kim
- Michael Angarano as Greg Rosso
- Bill Kottkamp as Derrick

=== Guest ===
- Jessy Hodges as Ms. Bennett ("Solo")
- Laura Kightlinger as Deb Taylor ("Community Service")
- Annie Korzen as Rose ("Community Service")
- Noah Mills as Flymiamibro22 ("AIM")
- Dana Heath as Ashley ("Wild Things")

== Episodes ==
Season	Episodes		Originally released
1	10		February 8, 2019
2	15	7	September 18, 2020
2	15	1	August 27, 2021
2	15	7	December 3, 2021

=== Season 1 (2019) ===
No. overall	No. in season	Title	Directed by	Written by	Original release date
1	1	"First Day"	Dan Longino	Maya Erskine & Anna Konkle & Sam Zvibleman	February 8, 2019
Anna Kone and Maya Ishii-Peters are best friends who want to do everything together as they start 7th grade. Anna tries to get the attention of her crush Alex, while Maya is led to believe that Brandt and Dustin, the two cutest boys in school, are both in love with her. After Maya finds out Brandt and Dustin were just playing a cruel trick on her, labeling her the "UGIS" (Ugliest Girl in School), she convinces her older brother to teach her how to stand up for herself. Her brother tells her to fight Brandt, but she realizes that she can resolve the conflict in a less violent way.
2	2	"Miranda"	Dan Longino	Maya Erskine & Anna Konkle & Sam Zvibleman	February 8, 2019
After their classmates tease them relentlessly for playing with their Sylvanian Families toys, they decide to fit in with the cool kids, Miranda and her friends. They end up in Miranda's garage, drinking beer and doing whippets. After Anna drinks an entire can of beer, Miranda's mother comes home unexpectedly and accuses Maya of drinking the beer even though she only had one sip, and the two begin to grow apart because Maya is mad at Anna. At the end of the episode, they are able to reconcile their friendship and decide not to smoke the cigarette they were saving for that time.
3	3	"Ojichan"	Dan Longino	Maya Erskine	February 8, 2019
Maya discovers masturbation, and lets it begin controlling her life while Anna believes Maya is ditching her. Meanwhile, Maya's mother tells her that her deceased grandfather, Ojiichan, is watching her always, causing Maya to become ashamed of her newfound pastime.
4	4	"Solo"	Andrew DeYoung	Sam Zvibleman	February 8, 2019
Maya and Anna both vie for solos in the school band and choir, respectively, for the fall concert. While Anna wins her solo and hopes to get Alex's attention with it, Maya takes it upon herself to learn an impromptu solo from her neighbor and rival Sam, so that she can impress her musician father who is coming home from his tour to see her perform. Meanwhile, Anna begins to grow close to an awkward boy named Brendan. At the recital, Maya lets loose and plays a random piece of music, embarrassing herself, but her father tells her that he is still proud.
5	5	"Community Service"	Andrew DeYoung	Jessica Watson	February 8, 2019
Anna and Maya perform in a community service fashion show alongside popular girl Heather and her mother when they fall into the possession of Heather's thong. They begin wearing the thong to school, and Maya realizes she doesn't want to give it back. The two girls begin trading the thong and wearing it proudly until Heather becomes suspicious and is forced to admit what she lost. Everyone then gets mad at Maya and Anna, and they realize that giving back the thong is the right thing to do.
6	6	"Posh"	Andrew DeYoung	Andrew Rhymer & Jeff Chan	February 8, 2019
While practicing for a Spice Girls-themed school project, Maya calls dibs on being Posh Spice, but is told she cannot because of her race. The other girls then begin hurling more racially charged taunts at Maya, while Anna is too afraid of her reputation to step in to help. Maya is even accused of being racist by her family for showing them the racist act she had to do because the other girls told her to. Anna gathers a group of drama students to do a small performance about race after the principal refuses to put on one for the entire school, but she gets in trouble and creates a rift with Maya.
7	7	"AIM"	Sam Zvibleman	Gabe Liedman	February 8, 2019
Anna and Maya create AIM accounts, and Maya ventures into a singles chat room where she strikes up a flirtatious friendship with a mystery man with the username Flymiamibro22. Meanwhile, Anna and Brendan try to add physical elements to their new relationship.
8	8	"Wild Things"	Sam Zvibleman	Maya Erskine & Anna Konkle & Sam Zvibleman	February 8, 2019
Maya realizes she might have feelings for her rival, Sam, just as he begins dating another girl. Anna and Maya are invited to a showing of Wild Things at Brendan's house. Anna and Brendan have their first kiss, which echoes Sam's encounter with Kelly in the movie, but it leads to more tension than romance, and Anna decides to break up with him.
9	9	"Anna Ishii-Peters"	Sam Zvibleman	Maya Erskine & Anna Konkle & Stacy Osei-Kuffour	February 8, 2019
Anna stays with Maya's family while her parents go on a retreat to save their marriage. Maya gets annoyed at the special attention her family gives Anna, and later gets emotional when she discovers she is having her first period. Meanwhile, Anna learns that her parents are splitting up. The stressful events in both girls' lives lead to a dramatic best-friend breakup.
10	10	"Dance"	Sam Zvibleman	Anna Konkle	February 8, 2019
Maya is upset when Anna chooses to go to the fall dance with Heather instead of her. At the dance, Heather tells Anna she's only letting her tag along because her mother told her to be nice. Anna and Maya reunite and get invited to be felt up in the janitor's closet by Brandt, who awkwardly admits he has a real crush on Maya. Meanwhile, Sam breaks up with Jenna because he realizes he may want Maya instead, and he confesses to Maya that he was her secret AIM boyfriend this whole time, which upsets her.

=== Season 2 (2020–21) ===
No. overall	No. in season	Title	Directed by	Written by	Original release date
Part 1
11	1	"Pool"	Sam Zvibleman	Sam Zvibleman	September 18, 2020
Maya and Anna get invited to a pool party at Alex's house, and they don't want to go but end up there anyway. They enjoy themselves, and agree that Anna should talk to Sam about pretending to be Flymiamibro22 on AIM and Maya should confront Brendan about breaking up with Anna. In both situations, the two girls end up causing more drama than they intended to, and decide that it is time they talk to Brandt about what happened at the dance. Although Brandt had told them to keep the encounter a secret, Maya revealed it to many people while trying to figure out why Brandt was denying that it happened. Jenna tells them that everyone is saying they're desperate sluts.
12	2	"Wrestle"	Sam Zvibleman	Gabe Liedman	September 18, 2020
Maya joins the wrestling team so she can spend more time around Brandt and get him to talk to her. Anna decides to join too, partially to get over her parents' divorce. Even though the coach is resistant to the girls being on the team, they gain weight by exercising, but after learning that the boys were making insults about them, they leave the team. Sam feels bad that he insulted them, as he did not know it would make them feel that bad. However, he still continues to spend time with Brandt's friend group instead of his real friends, who are surprised that he has left them.
13	3	"Vendy Wiccany"	Sam Zvibleman	Anna Konkle	September 18, 2020
After fleeing Anna's house during one of her parents arguments, Maya and Anna end up in the woods. Maya tries helping her friend deal with her parents' divorce and worsening relationship by getting Anna to believe that they have become witches, and have magical powers. While in the woods, they discover a business card for a Wendy Viccany, and take Vicanny being a letter off from Wiccany, or "Wiccan", as a sign, even though the card stated Wendy is only a real estate agent. Regardless, they use their newfound fake abilities to force the boys at school to like them. In the end, it doesn't work - Brandt tells Maya that he hates her and never wants to see her again. Dejected and sad, Maya goes to talk to Anna, and they use magic to make themselves feel better. Other students report them to the principal, and they both get in trouble with their parents.
14	4	"Three"	Sam Zvibleman	Vera Santamaria	September 18, 2020
Maura, a spoiled and manipulative rich girl, maneuvers her way into the girls' lives. Maura campaigns for them to be voted "Best Best Friends" at school, and they readily go along with it. However, unbeknownst to Maya and Anna, Maura is bribing other kids with candy to vote for her, and lying about it. Maura invites the friends over to her house, where she brags about her old friend, a doctor who she had to leave behind when she moved. Maura's disrespectful treatment of her mother rubs off on Maya and Anna, and during a shopping trip to the mall, they call their parents names. Both girls' mothers instinctively dislike Maura. The group wins the "Best Best Friends" title and, during a picture, Maura gives the group one piece of a heart necklace, but wants Maya to take her previous one off.
15	5	"Sleepover"	Sam Zvibleman	Josh Levine	September 18, 2020
Maura invites Maya and Anna over for a sleepover with two other girls, one of whom is only there because her mother made her do it. Anna and Maya grow further apart when Maura and Anna trap Maya in the bathroom and make her do a Bloody Mary and Maya and Maura draw on Anna's face. Maura insists that the group stay up all night, ignoring Maya's protests, but soon enough she is accused of clogging the toilet, leading to the fact that Maya had her period being revealed. Maura and the other girls comfort Anna, who is shocked that Maya didn't even tell her, but she later discovers that Maura's "friend" is really a photo cut out from a magazine advertisement.
16	6	"Play"	Sam Zvibleman	Maya Erskine	September 18, 2020
Though Gabe is starting to realize that he is gay, he asks Maya to be his girlfriend, and they rehearse for a play in which their characters have a kissing scene. Anna, upset that she did not get a role, joins the technical crew and begins to feud with Maya due to the stress of preparing for the play.
17	7	"Opening Night"	Sam Zvibleman	Sam Zvibleman	September 18, 2020
During the school play, Gabe avoids kissing Maya, causing her to panic and forget her lines. Anna helps her remember her lines, and the two make up. Maya tries to kiss Gabe again after the play, but he breaks up with her. Anna's father tells her that he is moving out of the house and she will have to choose whether to live with him or her mother.
Animated Special
18	8	"Jacuzzi"	Anna Konkle	Anna Konkle	August 27, 2021
Maya and Anna are taken by Anna's father Curtis on a road trip to Florida. On the boardwalk, the two get their pictures drawn, but find that their drawings are caricatures, with Anna's nose extended and the roundness of Maya's face greatly exaggerated. They plan to meet up at a night club with two boys they meet in the hotel jacuzzi, but they don't show up, leading them to believe that they were stood up because they are ugly. Anna gets too drunk at the club as a result, leading to an uncomfortable confrontation with her father.
Part 2
19	9	"Bat Mitzvah"	Dan Longino	Maya Erskine & Gabe Liedman	December 3, 2021
Maya and Anna are invited to a classmate's lavish Bat Mitzvah. Maya begs her parents to buy her an expensive necklace so that she can bring it as her gift, but when she presents it to her at the reception, it is barely acknowledged. Maya ends up stealing the necklace back and gives it to her mother. After hearing her teacher talk about The Holocaust, Anna starts obsessing over God and whether there is an afterlife. Steve and Anna see each other again, and Steve wants to be her boyfriend.
20	10	"Shadow"	Dan Longino	Rachele Lynn & Diana Tay	December 3, 2021
Ume, a young family friend from Japan visits, and Maya is jealous of her. In the middle of the night, Ume has to use the bathroom, but walks in on Maya, who is pleasuring herself. Ume is uncomfortable with what she saw, and Maya is embarrassed that she was seen in such a compromising position. But in the end, Maya apologizes for being "weird" to Ume, and they hug it out.
21	11	"Yuki"	Maya Erskine	Maya Erskine	December 3, 2021
Maya's mother is the focus of this episode. While food shopping, Yuki runs into her ex-husband, who is there from Japan on business, and is Shuji's birth father. They spend time reminiscing with each other, and whether they've made the right choices in their lives. When Yuki returns home, she spends time alone with Maya and Shuji, and tells them both how much she loves them.
22	12	"Grammy"	Andy DeYoung	Alyssa DiMari & Josh Levine	December 3, 2021
Maya is diagnosed with ADD and Irlen syndrome. Very shortly after Anna's grandmother comes to live with them, she passes away. At the funeral service, Anna and Maya can't stop giggling. Maya finally meets Derrick.
23	13	"Luminaria"	Anna Konkle	Anna Konkle	December 3, 2021
Anna and Maya participate in a Walk for Cancer. They meet a boy named Brett who has cancer and asks to be kissed. The girls are not sure if he is joking or not but decide to kiss him on the cheek. Later, Brett’s sister confronts them and yells at them for thinking he may be lying about his cancer. In the evening, Derrick and Steve come to visit the girls and sleep in their tent with them.
24	14	"Runaway"	Andy DeYoung	Rachele Lynn	December 3, 2021
At the grocery store, Anna is approached by a woman who asks if she's interested in modeling and hands her a pamphlet. Anna and Maya are excited at this prospect, but Anna's mom says no, saying that it is likely a scam as the program requires a $3,000 fee. At the same time, Maya also gets upset with her mother, who gives Shuji a cell phone but tells Maya she is not mature enough to have one. Maya and Anna decide to run away together, and Maya dresses up as Anna's mother to escort her to the modeling session. At the modeling session, Maya becomes worried about Anna, and walks in with pictures being taken of Anna down to her bra. Maya pulls her out of there, and they later call up Derrick and Steve to pick them up.
25	15	"Home"	Andy DeYoung	Vera Santamaria	December 3, 2021
The four go to Derrick’s house where they attempt to have sex. During an awkward encounter, Maya gives Derrick a blowjob, which she dislikes intensely. Anna and Maya go home. Derrick breaks up with Maya over the phone, and Maya’s friends resolve to egg Derrick’s house. Steve declines to join them, and Anna breaks up with him. Since Maya only brought squid, the group throws squid at Derrick’s house. While hiding after the incident, Anna develops a crush on Shuji and Sam gives Maya her first kiss. Afterwards, Maya and Anna reminiscence about their past and promise to take care of each other in the future.

== Production ==
On April 19, 2018, Hulu announced that it had given the production a series order for a first season consisting of ten episodes. Erskine and Konkle were also expected to write for the series and Zvibleman was set to direct multiple episodes. Production companies involved with the series were slated to consist of The Lonely Island, Party Over Here, Odenkirk Provissiero Entertainment, and AwesomenessTV. On November 19, 2018, it was announced that the series would premiere on February 8, 2019. Alongside the announcement of the series order, it was confirmed that Erskine and Konkle would star in the series as well. Erskine and Konkle also served as co-showrunners; Zvibleman and Gabe Liedman were also co-showrunners for the first season. On May 1, 2019, it was reported that Hulu renewed the series for a second season, of which the first seven episodes were released on September 18, 2020. The first episode from the second set of seven episodes premiered on August 27, 2021. Originally intended to run for three seasons, the filming of the second season was severely delayed by the COVID-19 pandemic, and by the conclusion both Erskine and Konkle had new acting roles, as well as parental responsibilities. On November 29, 2021, it was reported that the series' second season would be its final season.

The show is based on the childhood experiences of creators Erskine and Konkle, although in reality they did not meet until they were in college. Erskine, Konkle and Zvibleman originally wanted other teenage characters to be played by adult actors as well, but it was decided that Maya and Anna would be the only ones, as it "just further made [them] like aliens". In sexual scenes, underage actors were switched with adult stunt doubles.

To reflect the year the show was set in, production designer Grace Alie and set decorator Ali Rubinfeld took inspiration from their own childhoods, using details from their own and their siblings' childhood bedrooms. Inspiration was also taken from old magazines at a library in downtown Los Angeles, along with T.V. shows from the early 2000s, such as Are You Afraid of the Dark? and Lizzie McGuire. Many items and props were bought from thrift stores in Los Angeles and Palm Springs, and some items, such as Teen Beat magazines and a vintage Unisonic phone, were bought on eBay. The rooms of Anna and Maya were made to reflect the characters; Maya's room was more messy due to her being "more out-there and experimenting with what is going on inside of her", and the rest of the house "is indicative of a homey and harmonious partnership". Anna's house was designed to reflect her parents slowly divorcing, while her room "became, by design, a safe haven".

Budget restraints during season one were "the biggest challenge" according to Alie, who said they "had to be really resourceful and crafty with how we spent our money", while for season two, "we had more money and we got to build all these amazing sets on stage". Location scouting was thus also a challenge due to the budget restraints. When filming scenes in the middle school, whiteboards were replaced with chalkboards.

== Release ==
On November 19, 2018, a video was released announcing the premiere date of the series. On December 20, 2018, a teaser trailer for the series was released. On January 18, 2019, an official trailer and poster were released. The first season was released on Hulu on February 8, 2019, and the first seven episodes of the second season were released on September 18, 2020. The eighth episode of the season was released on August 27, 2021, and the rest premiered on December 3, 2021.

== Reception ==
=== Season 1 ===
On the review aggregation website Rotten Tomatoes, the series holds a 97% approval rating with an average rating of 8.04 out of 10 based on 47 reviews. The website's critical consensus reads, "Viewers willing to suspend their disbelief will find much to enjoy in Pen15, wherein Maya Erskine and Anna Konkle reprise their adolescent selves – stirring up plenty of yucks and pathos amidst the farce." Metacritic, which uses a weighted average, assigned the series a score of 82 out of 100 based on 17 critics.

Caroline Framke from Variety praised the show for being "written for and by women", and how the show "nails the truly bizarre experience that is being a simultaneously over-confident and incredibly insecure teenage girl". She also praises how the show takes clichés, such as getting caught masturbating, that in coming of age stories are "almost always a boy" and "hands that scene over to a girl". James Poniewozik from The New York Times similarly praises how the show "brashly claims the kind of horny humor that past teen comedies reserved for guys", while also noting that the show "understands that sex comedy isn't just about sex. In this case, it's about growing and self-definition and letting go of childhood." Adrian Horton from The Guardian compared the show to "a lived-in, live-action version of Big Mouth" and also saying that though the show has a "studied commitment to the Y2K aesthetic", "plenty of the everyday conundrums of middle school ... are likely to transcend the [millenial] target audience". Tim Goodman from The Hollywood Reporter saw the decision for the show to be set in middle school negatively, saying "maybe the coming-of-age stories pale in comparison to those unfolding ... in high school", comparing it to "Netflix's painfully funny Sex Education", also saying that the show's downside is the "repetitive sketch feel".

=== Season 2 ===
On Rotten Tomatoes, season two holds a 100% approval rating based on 52 reviews with an average rating of 8.82/10. The critical consensus reads, "An excellent showcase for Maya Erskine, Anna Konkle, and their well-cast classmates, Pen15's sophomore season goes deeper into the nuances of middle school life without losing any of its cringey charm." On Metacritic, season 2 received a score of 93 out of 100 based on 11 critical reviews.

Alan Sepinwall from Rolling Stone stated that "by this point in the series' lifespan", Anna and Maya being "played by women in their early thirties ... barely even feels like a joke", praising how they had "already disappeared so deeply into their gangly, awkward younger selves". Referring to the sudden cancellation of the show, he also expressed that the "sense of finality isn't really palpable in the new installments, other than a lovely, wistful, perfect closing scene". Sepinwall also praised the meta jokes about the actors' real age, such as a girl telling Anna "You talk like you're 40, kind of." Rebecca Nicholson from The Guardian said the show had "matured into a remarkably sensitive and beautiful series about life, friendship and growing up", and that towards the end of the season, "the series takes on a darker hue".

=== Accolades ===
Award nominations for Pen15
Year	Award	Category	Nominee(s)	Result	Ref.
2019	Primetime Emmy Awards	Outstanding Writing for a Comedy Series	Maya Erskine, Anna Konkle and Stacy Osei-Kuffour (for "Anna Ishii-Peters")	Nominated	
2019	Gotham Awards	Breakthrough Series – Short Form	Pen15	Won	
2020	Critics' Choice Television Awards	Best Comedy Series	Pen15	Nominated	
2020	Casting Society of America	Television Pilot & First Season – Comedy	Melissa DeLizia	Nominated	
2020	Writers Guild of America Awards	Comedy Series	Jeff Chan, Maya Erskine, Anna Konkle, Gabe Liedman, Stacy Osei-Kuffour, Andrew Rhymer, Jessica Watson and Sam Zvibleman	Nominated	
2020	Writers Guild of America Awards	New Series	Jeff Chan, Maya Erskine, Anna Konkle, Gabe Liedman, Stacy Osei-Kuffour, Andrew Rhymer, Jessica Watson and Sam Zvibleman	Nominated	
2021	Critics' Choice Television Awards	Best Comedy Series	Pen15	Nominated	
2021	Writers Guild of America Awards	Comedy Series	Alyssa DiMari, Maya Erskine, Anna Konkle, Josh Levine, Gabe Liedman, Rachele Lynn, Vera Santamaria, Diana Tay and Sam Zvibleman	Nominated	
2021	Television Critics Association Awards	Outstanding Achievement in Comedy	Pen15	Nominated	
2021	Television Critics Association Awards	Individual Achievement in Comedy	Maya Erskine	Nominated	
2021	Primetime Emmy Awards	Outstanding Comedy Series	Maya Erskine, Anna Konkle, Sam Zvibleman, Debbie Liebling, Vera Santamaria, Marc Provissiero, Brooke Pobjoy, Andy Samberg, Jorma Taccone, Akiva Schaffer, Becky Sloviter, Shelley Zimmerman, Brin Lukens, Jordan Levin, Don Dunn, Scott Levine and Jeremy Reitz	Nominated	
2021	Primetime Emmy Awards	Outstanding Writing for a Comedy Series	Maya Erskine (for "Play")	Nominated	
2021	Primetime Creative Arts Emmy Awards	Outstanding Casting for a Comedy Series	Melissa DeLizia	Nominated	
2022	Peabody Awards	Entertainment	Pen15	Nominated	
