= Nobody 2 =

- Theatrical release poster
- Directed by: Timo Tjahjanto
- Screenplay by: Derek Kolstad; Aaron Rabin (Note: Bob Odenkirk and Umair Aleem are credited by the Writers Guild of America with "additional literary material (not on-screen)".)
- Story by: Derek Kolstad
- Produced by: Kelly McCormick; David Leitch; Bob Odenkirk; Marc Provissiero; Braden Aftergood
- Starring: Bob Odenkirk; Connie Nielsen; John Ortiz; Colin Hanks; RZA; Christopher Lloyd; Sharon Stone
- Cinematography: Callan Green
- Edited by: Elísabet Ronaldsdóttir
- Music by: Dominic Lewis
- Production companies: 87North Productions; Odenkirk Provissiero Entertainment
- Distributed by: Universal Pictures
- Release date: August 15, 2025 (United States)
- Running time: 89 minutes
- Country: United States
- Language: English
- Budget: $25 million
- Box office: $43 million

Nobody 2 is a 2025 American action thriller film directed by Timo Tjahjanto (in his English-language debut) from a screenplay by Derek Kolstad and Aaron Rabin. It is a sequel to Nobody (2021). Bob Odenkirk, Connie Nielsen, RZA, Colin Salmon, Gage Munroe, Paisley Cadorath and Christopher Lloyd reprise their roles from the first film while John Ortiz, Colin Hanks, and Sharon Stone play new characters. In the film, a retired assassin and family man Hutch Mansell (Odenkirk) tries to reconnect with his wife Becca (Nielsen) and kids on a relaxing vacation. Instead, they land in a small town where an old theme park hides a dangerous criminal drug and smuggling ring.

Nobody 2 was released in the United States by Universal Pictures on August 15, 2025. The film received generally positive reviews from critics, and grossed $43 million worldwide against a budget of $25 million.

== Plot ==
After the events of the first film, Hutch Mansell has to work for the Barber as an assassin to pay off the debt he owes after destroying a Russian obshchak. His relationship with his family has grown distant as a result, especially with his wife, Becca. Exhausted from his last assignment, Hutch tells the Barber that he needs a break. The Barber agrees, although he warns Hutch that trouble follows him, saying, "Wherever you go, there you are."

He takes his family to Plummerville, Wisconsin, which has an amusement park he went to as a child, promising Becca that he will leave his life as Nobody behind for the vacation. While at an arcade, Brady, his teenage son, gets picked on by Max, a local teenage bully who destroys Brady's younger sister Sammy's plushie. When an employee slaps the back of Sammy's head, Hutch tries to ignore it but then beats up the staff, drawing the ire of both Wyatt, Max's father and the owner of the amusement park, and Abel, a corrupt sheriff. Wyatt wants Hutch and his family to leave the park, but Abel secretly sends his men to kill them.

The next day, on a tour boat, Hutch is attacked by some of Abel's men, losing part of his left pinky finger in the process. He soon finds out from his brother Harry that Plummerville is a bootlegging route, while the Barber informs him that the route belongs to Lendina, whom Abel works for, and Wyatt has to pay off. When Wyatt tells Lendina he wants to quit working for her after the latest payment, she has Abel kidnap Max to force Wyatt to comply. Hutch, aiming to de-escalate the situation, tells Abel that he and his family will leave town. However, when he sees Max, he rescues him. He burns a stash of Lendina's money and drugs, destroying the warehouse and scarring Abel in the resulting explosion.

Hutch and Max head to an old lodge where Brady and Max make amends. While Becca is angry that he could not keep his promise of not getting into more trouble, she tells him that she is not going anywhere and he must fix it. He and Wyatt reconcile and prepare the amusement park for Lendina's arrival, with assistance from Harry and their father David. Lendina has Abel executed, while Hutch and Wyatt kill the vast majority of her men. Harry kills her henchmen at the lodge, while Wyatt is shot in the leg, and David is knocked unconscious. Lendina attacks Hutch, but is shot in the eye with a dart by Becca. David recovers and blows up the park, killing Lendina and the rest of her men. After being interrogated in an unknown hangar, Hutch and Becca are freed on orders from an anonymous source. Later on, the family watches a visual album of their vacation.

== Cast ==
- Bob Odenkirk as Hutch Mansell, a former government assassin known as "Nobody".
  - Nolan Grantham as young Hutch
- Connie Nielsen as Rebecca "Becca" Mansell, Hutch's successful wife.
- John Ortiz as Wyatt Martin, a corrupt theme park operator and a debt bondage slave to Lendina.
  - Felipe Salazar as young Wyatt
- Colin Hanks as Abel, a corrupt sheriff
- RZA as Harry Mansell, Hutch's adopted younger brother.
  - Jahron Wilson as young Harry
- Christopher Lloyd as David Mansell, Hutch's father and a retired FBI agent.
  - Jeremy Warren as young David
- Sharon Stone as Lendina, the mastermind behind an organized crime operation.
- Colin Salmon as "the Barber", Hutch's former government handler.
- Gage Munroe as Brady Mansell, Hutch's teenage son.
- Paisley Cadorath as Sammy Mansell, Hutch's young daughter.
- Jacob Blair as Dann, a deputy sheriff
- Daniel Bernhardt as Kartoush, Lendina's henchman.
- Lucius Hoyos as Max Martin, Wyatt's teenage son.
- David Maclnnis as Toby
- Cindy Myskiw as a bathing senior
- Zara Longe as a waitress
- Ryan Younes as Max's friend

== Production ==
In March 2021, Connie Nielsen expressed interest in reprising her role as Becca Mansell in a sequel to Nobody. The actress stated that she would like to learn more about Hutch and Becca's backstory, while stating that discussions regarding how the two characters met took place on the set of the first film. In June of the same year, it was announced that Derek Kolstad was in the process of writing a sequel, although it had yet to be green-lit by the studio. In March 2022, 87North Productions announced on social media that the studio was looking forward to working on Nobody 2, though no official production date was announced at that time. By August of the same year, David Leitch confirmed that work on the script was ongoing, while stating that the studio had committed to releasing a sequel.

In December 2022, Kelly McCormick announced that a sequel was officially happening, with principal photography scheduled for 2023. In January 2024, Nielsen confirmed that developments on the sequel were ongoing while confirming that she will reprise her role from the first installment. In March, Leitch confirmed production was set to begin by the end of 2024. In June, it was confirmed that Nielsen would reprise her role as Becca. That same month, it was revealed that Indonesian director Timo Tjahjanto (in his English-language debut) had been hired to direct the film, and the screenplay received updates from Kolstad and Aaron Rabin, with additional literary contributions from Bob Odenkirk and Umair Aleem. Kirill Sokolov was originally set to direct; prior to a scheduling issue with another film. In July, Sharon Stone joined the cast in an undisclosed role, with Christopher Lloyd reprising his role as David Mansell from the first film. In August, Colin Hanks joined the cast in an undisclosed role. In September, John Ortiz joined the cast in an undisclosed role, while Tjahjanto revealed in one of his tweets that RZA is reprising his role as Harry Mansell. Michael Ironside was reported to be reprising his role as Eddie Williams, but does not appear in the finished film.

Principal photography began on August 6, 2024, in Winnipeg, and wrapped on September 26.

== Release ==
The film was released theatrically on August 15, 2025. It was later made available for digital download on September 2 the same year.

== Reception ==
=== Box office ===
As of September 14, 2025, Nobody 2 has grossed $21.5 million in the United States and Canada, and $21.5 million in other territories, for a worldwide total of $43 million.

In the United States and Canada, Nobody 2 was released alongside Americana, and was projected to gross $10–12 million from 3,000 theaters in its opening weekend. It made $3.8 million on its first day, including $1.3 million in Thursday previews. The film went on to debut to $9.2 million, finishing in third behind holdovers Weapons and Freakier Friday.

=== Critical response ===
On the review aggregator website Rotten Tomatoes, 76% of 204 critics' reviews are positive, with an average rating of 6.3/10. The website's consensus reads: "While frumpy action-hero Hutch Mansell tries to enjoy a nice vacation, Bob Odenkirk works overtime to make Nobody 2 a diverting sequel that measures up admirably to the original." Metacritic, which uses a weighted average, assigned the film a score of 59 out of 100, based on 32 critics, indicating "mixed or average" reviews. Audiences polled by CinemaScore gave the film an average grade of "B+" on an A+ to F scale, while those surveyed by PostTrak gave it an average 4 out of 5 stars, with 62% saying they would "definitely recommend" it.
