= When Jeff Tried to Save the World =

- Directed by: Kendall Goldberg
- Written by: Kendall Goldberg; Rachel Borgo
- Produced by: Shane Simmons; Jimmy Seargeant; Kendall Goldberg; Sam Slater
- Starring: Jon Heder
- Production companies: Bad Rack Entertainment; Burn Later Productions
- Distributed by: FilmHub
- Release date: April 27, 2018 (Newport Beach)
- Running time: 93 minutes
- Country: United States
- Language: English

When Jeff Tried to Save the World is a 2018 American comedy drama film written by Kendall Goldberg and Rachel Borgo, directed by Goldberg and starring Jon Heder, Brendan Meyer, Anna Konkle, Maya Erskine, Candi Milo, Steve Berg, Richard Esteras and Jim O'Heir.

== Plot ==
Jeff is an anxious thirty-something who has worked for several years as the general manager of Winkys World, a dilapidated bowling alley in the suburbs of Chicago. He is a talented college dropout who left MIT to instead work at the bowling alley, which has caused him to go no-contact with his entire family out of fear for what they may think. Despite the repetitive environment, Jeff enjoys working at Winkys. Jeff has also designed an elaborate video game named “Wizzing Winkys” which is modeled after the bowling alley.

Some of Jeff's colleagues include layabout Stanford, the teenaged nephew of Carl, the owner of Winkys, and Shelia, Carl’s ex-wife/the bowling alley operations manager. Jeff gets along well with the other employees and has an excellent rapport with Wizzys’ regular customers, though he has no personal life outside of his work.

Jeff is informed by Shelia that Carl intends on selling the bowling alley and closing the business within 30 days. Not wanting to lose the sense of comfort he has working at Winkys, Jeff devises a plan to prevent the sale from going forward; an elaborate weekend event that he knows Carl will attend in an effort to make him see the business isn’t a lost cause. Working in tandem with Jeff’s plan, Shelia attempts to wine and dine Carl in an effort to change his mind, though this proves unsuccessful. Stanford agrees to help as well but his efforts to sway his Uncle's mind come up short.

Jeff is unexpectedly visited by his sister Lindy and her friend Samantha who inadvertently learn of Jeffs new life, though they both promise to keep it a secret from the rest of Jeff and Lindy's family. However Lindy strongly encourages Jeff to reconnect with their mother, whose calls Jeff declines throughout the film. Although he is initially annoyed by their intrusive visit, he warms up to them both and develops a romantic connection with Samantha.

Shortly thereafter, Jeff and Stanford discover an elderly homeless man has been secretly living in the bowling alley and they take him to the hospital where he falls into a coma. He is later revealed to be Ernie "The Gernie", an original founding member of the Winkys World bowling team and a friend of the original owner. Jeff's relationship with Lindy is slowly restored as preparations for the weekend event are laid in place, as is his gusto for life in general. Lindy assures Jeff his departure from MIT is nothing to be embarrassed of, which he slowly takes to heart as his confidence grows. Samantha leaves town on good terms with Jeff and promises to keep in touch.

Lindy eventually informs their family members of his current situation, and their mother leaves Jeff a voicemail assuring him they don't care about his job and only wish him happiness.

The weekend event is a great success with massive attendance which impresses Carl, but he sees through the ploy and informs Jeff of his intent to move forward with the sale. Carl gains a newfound sense of respect for Jeff and lets him know this, wishing Jeff well in his future endeavors. Ernie is eventually released from the hospital and he attends a small closing ceremony hosted by Shelia, Jeff, Stanford and the other employees to celebrate the bowling alley and to say goodbye to it. The farewell goes well and the employees promise to stay in touch with one another. Jeff makes peace with the bowling alley being sold and resolves to make the best of his future, though the road ahead remains uncertain. He receives a text from Samantha and Jeff encourages her to return soon for another visit. The film ends with Jeff finally calling his mother.

== Cast ==
- Jon Heder as Jeff
- Brendan Meyer as Stanford
- Anna Konkle as Lindy
- Maya Erskine as Samantha
- Candi Milo as Sheila
- Steve Berg as Frank
- Jim O'Heir as Carl
- Richard Esteras as Raul

== Production ==
The film was shot in Chicago and Lansing, Illinois in August 2017. Heder confirmed in an interview with the Chicago Tribune that he auditioned for the film.

== Release ==
The film premiered at the Newport Beach Film Festival on April 27, 2018. It was released on VOD on December 7, 2018.

== Reception ==
The film has an 86% rating on Rotten Tomatoes based on seven reviews.

Cath Clarke of The Guardian awarded the film two stars out of five. Matt Fagerholm of RogerEbert.com awarded the film three stars.
