= Marc Provissiero =

Entertainment manager, television and film producer

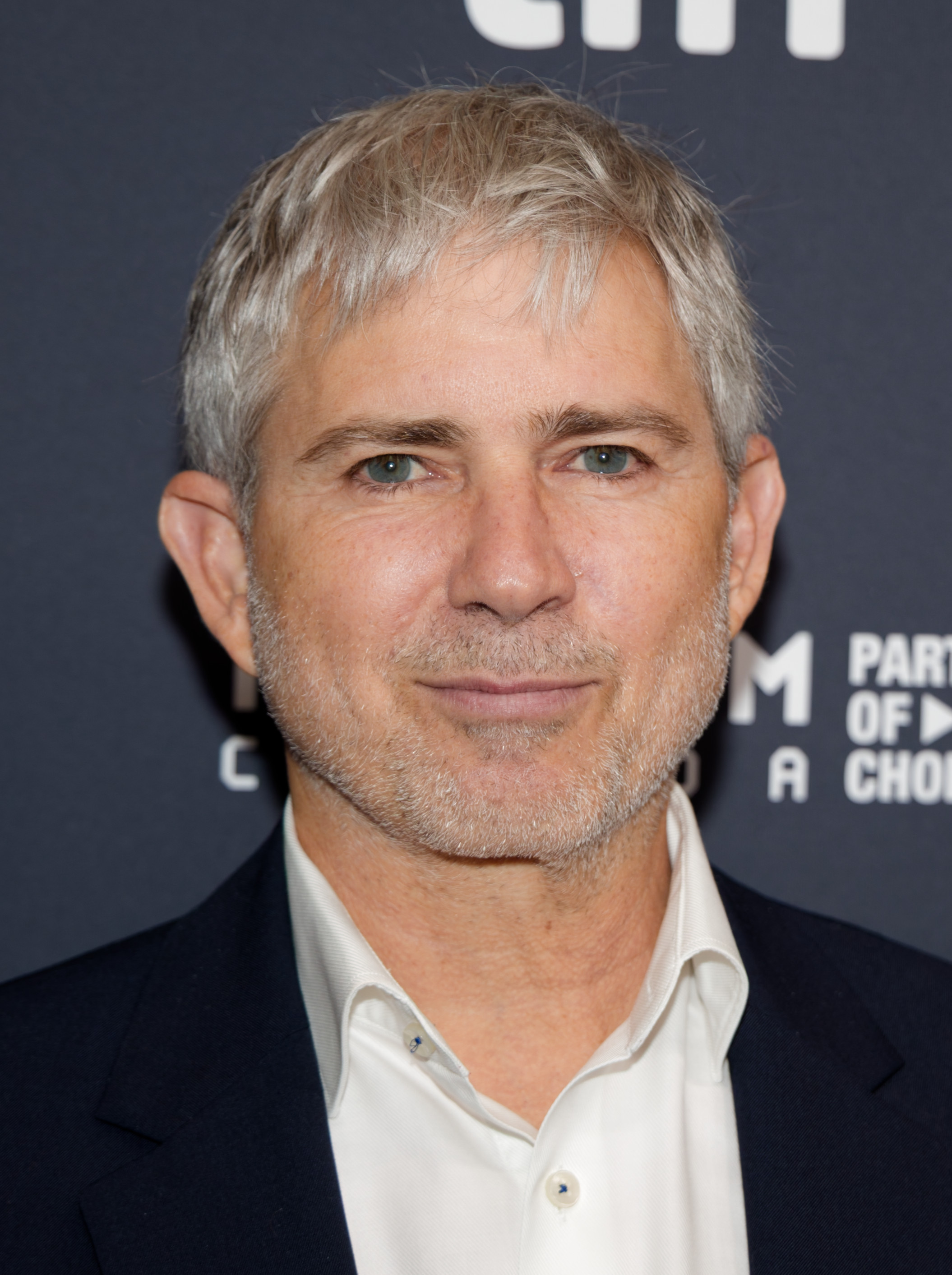
Provissiero at the 2025 Toronto International Film Festival for Normal

Marc Provissiero is an American entertainment manager, film and television producer, and a founding partner at OPE Partners, which represents artists and creators in film and TV. He is best known for producing No Hard Feelings (2023), Nobody (2021), and Pen15 (2019–2021).

== Life and career ==
Provissiero spent ten years as a literary agent, eventually working for the William Morris Agency. He left that role and later formed Odenkirk Provissiero Entertainment, now OPE Partners, with Naomi Odenkirk. Provissiero's clients include Bob Odenkirk, Tim Robinson, Anna Konkle, and Randall Einhorn.

As a film producer, Provissiero produced the comedy No Hard Feelings starring Jennifer Lawrence by filmmaker Gene Stupnitsky for Sony Pictures, earning $88 million at the box office.

He produced the action thriller Nobody starring Bob Odenkirk, Christopher Lloyd, Connie Nielsen and RZA for Universal Pictures.. Nobody 2 added Sharon Stone to the cast, making $44 million at the box office with a top 10 ranking for Netflix in 2026.

His latest film, Normal, written by Derek Kolstad (John Wick, Nobody), directed by Ben Wheatley (Free Fire), starring Bob Odenkirk, Henry Winkler and Lena Headey, was the most competitive title at the 2025 Toronto Film Festival.

In television, Provissiero won the Gotham Award for "Breakthrough series" and was nominated for Emmy as Executive Producer for the Hulu show PEN15 (winner of the Gotham Independent Film Awards) and for Outstanding Comedy Series). Series was created by and starred Anna Konkle and Maya Erskine. Sam Zvibleman is also a c-creator. Provissiero is also an executive producer on the Bob Odenkirk-led series Lucky Hank for AMC based on the novel Straight Man by Richard Russo. He produced the Netflix animation series Paradise PD.

== Awards and nominations ==
Provissiero has nine nominations and one win for Pen15. The win was Gotham Spirit Award - Breakthrough Series.

== Filmography ==
- Normal (2025)
- Nobody 2 (2025) - Producer
- No Hard Feelings (2023) - Producer
- Nobody (2021) - Producer
- PEN15 (2019-2021) - TV series, Executive Producer
- Happy Anniversary (2018) - Producer
- Paradise PD (2018-2022) - TV series, Executive Producer
- Girlfriend's Day (2017) - Producer
