= Connie Nielsen =

Danish actress (born 1965)

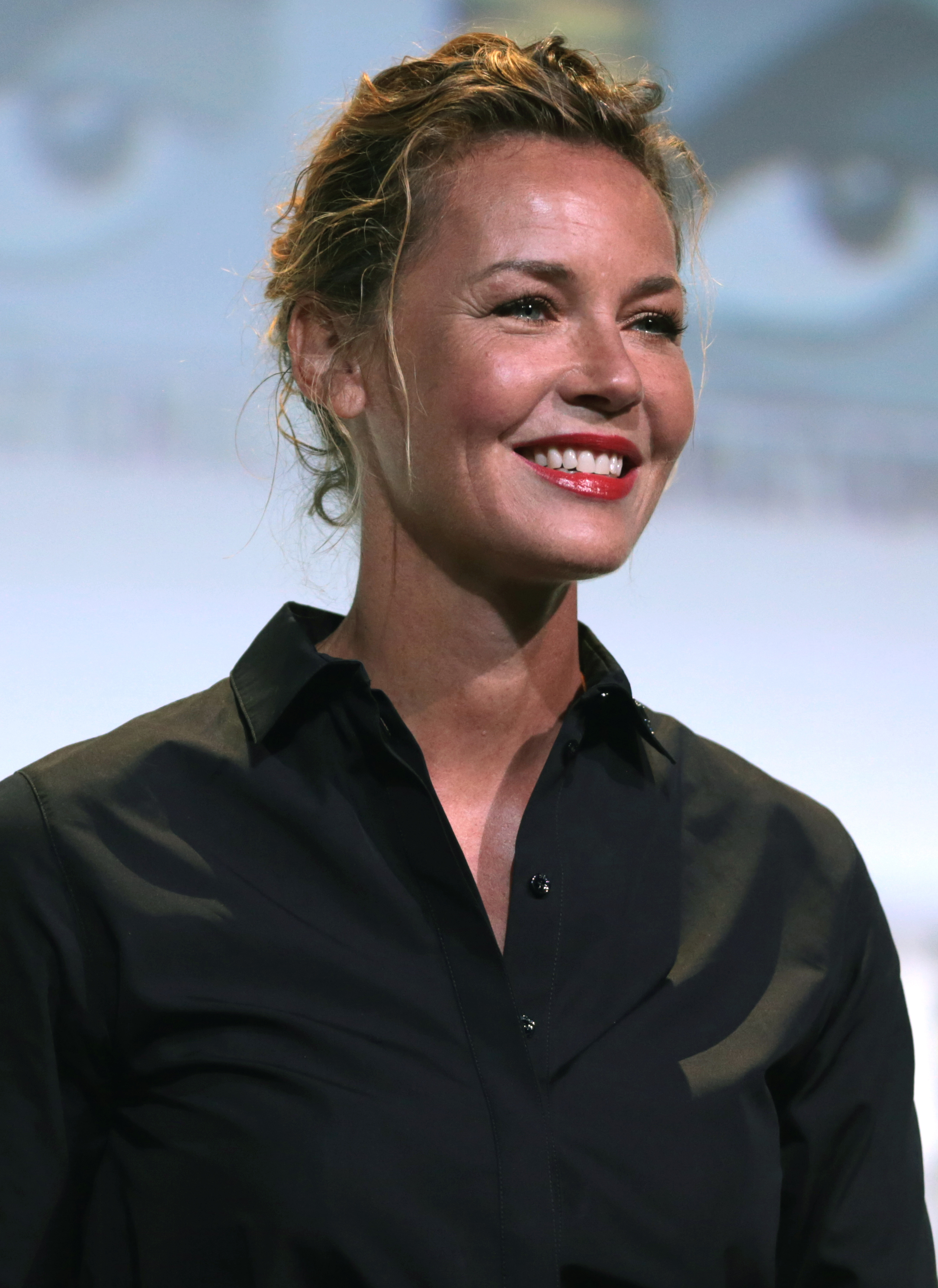
- Nielsen in 2016
- Born: Connie Inge-Lise Nielsen; 3 July 1965 (age 61); Frederikshavn, Denmark
- Occupation: Actress
- Years active: 1984–present
- Spouse: Fabio Sartor (divorced)
- Partner: Lars Ulrich (2004–2012)
- Children: 2

Connie Inge-Lise Nielsen (born 3 July 1965) is a Danish actress. She has starred as Lucilla in the films Gladiator (2000) and Gladiator II (2024) and as Queen Hippolyta in the DC Extended Universe (2017–2021). She has also starred in films such as Soldier (1998), Mission to Mars (2000), One Hour Photo (2002), Basic (2003), The Hunted (2003), The Ice Harvest (2005), Nymphomaniac (2013), 3 Days to Kill (2014), Inheritance (2020), Nobody (2021) and its sequel Nobody 2 (2025).

She also had roles as New York Police Department Detective Dani Beck, the temporary partner of Christopher Meloni's Elliot Stabler in the NBC crime drama series Law & Order: Special Victims Unit (2006), the Starz political drama series Boss (2011–2012), the Fox crime thriller series The Following (2014), and the TNT limited drama series I Am the Night (2019), and starred in the Channel 4 drama series Close to Me (2021).

== Early life ==
Nielsen was born in Frederikshavn and grew up in the village of Elling, Denmark. Her father, Bent Nielsen, was a bus driver, and her mother, Laila Inge-lise Matzigkeit (1945–2014), was an insurance clerk, who also acted and wrote musical reviews. She was raised as a member of the Church of Jesus Christ of Latter-day Saints, a Mormon.

She began her acting career working alongside her mother on the local revue and variety scene. At 18, she traveled to Paris, where she worked as an actress and model, which led to further work and study in Italy—at drama school in Rome and in master classes with Lydia Styx, a teacher at Piccolo Teatro di Milano in Milan. She lived in Italy for many years before moving to the United States.

== Career ==
Nielsen's feature-film debut was the Jerry Lewis French film Par où t'es rentré ? On t'a pas vu sortir in 1984, followed by a role in the Italian miniseries Colletti Bianchi in 1988. She appeared in the Italian film Vacanze di Natale '91 (1991) and the French film Le Paradis Absolument (1993).

She moved to the United States in the mid-1990s, and made her first appearance in a major English-language film in 1997 as Christabella Andreoli in The Devil's Advocate, starring opposite Al Pacino and Keanu Reeves. This first minor breakthrough led to roles in the films Permanent Midnight (1998), Rushmore (1998), and Soldier (1998). Nielsen later became proud of her roles as exotic femme fatales in The Devil's Advocate and Rushmore, saying: "I don't believe in a feminism that represses female sexuality, but there's a fine line between expression and exploitation".

In 2000, Nielsen appeared as Lucilla in Ridley Scott's Gladiator, starring opposite Russell Crowe and Joaquin Phoenix. Since then, she has starred in American films, including Mission to Mars (2000), One Hour Photo (2002), The Hunted (2003), and Basic (2003), for which she had to cut off most of her hair. She also starred in the French thriller Demonlover (2002), directed by Olivier Assayas. She played the Irish mother to an orphan in A Shine of Rainbows (2009).

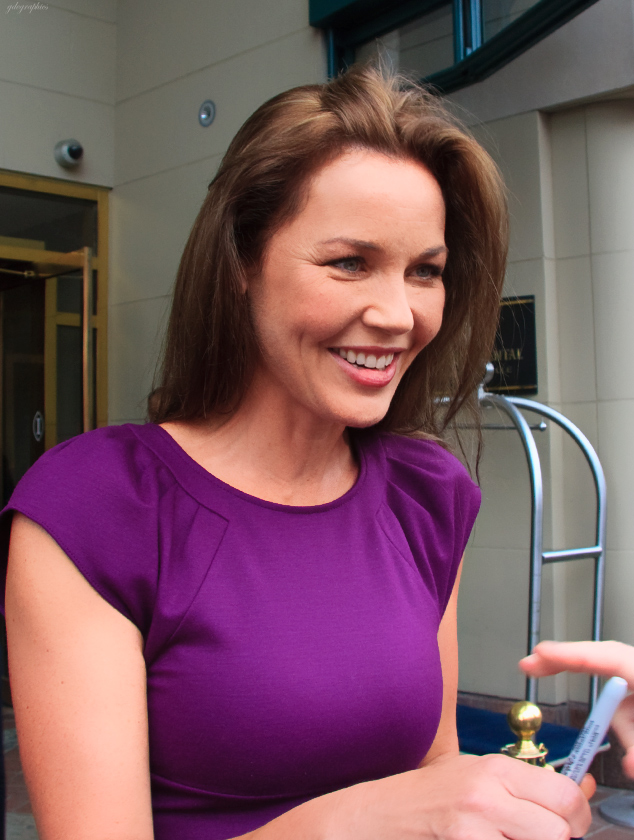
Nielsen in 2009

In 2004, Nielsen made her Danish film debut in the drama, Brødre (also known as Brothers), for which she won the Danish Best Actress Award, the Bodil, as well as Best Actress at the San Sebastian International Film Festival. She was also nominated for Best Actress at the European Film Awards. In 2006, Nielsen appeared in several episodes of Law & Order: Special Victims Unit as Detective Dani Beck. She filled in for Mariska Hargitay, who was on maternity leave at the time of filming.

With Charlotte Gainsbourg, Jamie Bell, and Uma Thurman, Nielsen appeared in the 2014 Lars Von Trier film Nymphomaniac. She was featured in a series of promotional posters prior to the film's release, a campaign The Independent described as "shocking", observing, "Connie Nielsen appears somewhat moist in this poster for Nymphomaniac".

In 2015, she appeared on the TV-2 album Det gode liv in which she sang along with Steffen Brandt on the track "Brev til Mona". In September 2018, she appeared in the pilot episode of the CBS drama FBI with Jeremy Sisto and Missy Peregrym.

Nielsen is known as Queen Hippolyta in DC Extended Universe franchise, appearing in four films beginning with Wonder Woman (2017). She also starred in the action movie Nobody (2021) and its sequel Nobody 2 (2025).

== Personal life ==
From 2004 to 2012, Nielsen dated Metallica drummer and fellow Dane, Lars Ulrich. They have one son together. Nielsen had a son from a previous marriage to fellow actor Fabio Sartor.

Nielsen is fluent in her native Danish, English, French, German, Italian, Norwegian and Swedish. She also knows some Spanish.

== Filmography ==
=== Film ===
Year	Title	Role	Notes
1984	Par où t'es rentré ? On t'a pas vu sortir	Eva	Credited as Connie Nielson
1991	Vacanze di Natale '91	Brunilde / Vanessa	
1997	The Devil's Advocate	Christabella Andreoli	
1998	Permanent Midnight	Dagmar	
1998	Rushmore	Mrs. Calloway	
1998	Soldier	Sandra	
2000	Innocents	Megan Denright	
2000	Mission to Mars	Terri Fisher	
2000	Gladiator	Lucilla	
2002	One Hour Photo	Nina Yorkin	
2002	Demonlover	Diane de Monx	
2003	The Hunted	Abby Durrell	
2003	Basic	Capt. Julia Osborne	
2004	Brødre	Sarah	
2004	Return to Sender	Charlotte Cory	
2005	The Great Raid	Margaret Utinsky	
2005	The Ice Harvest	Renata Crest	
2006	The Situation	Anna Molyneux	
2007	Battle in Seattle	Jean	
2009	A Shine of Rainbows	Maire O'Donnell	
2010	Kidnappet	Susanne	
2011	Perfect Sense	Jenny	
2013	Nymphomaniac	Katherine	
2013	The Galapagos Affair: Satan Came to Eden	Baroness Von Wagner	Voice
2014	3 Days to Kill	Christine Renner	
2014	Return to Zero	Dr. Claire Holden	
2014	All Relative	Maren	
2015	The Runner	Deborah Price	
2016	Ali and Nino	Duchess Kipiani	
2016	The 11th	Katrine Firth	
2016	Løvekvinnen	Mrs Grjothornet	
2016	The Confessions	Claire Seth	
2017	Stratton	Sumner	
2017	Wonder Woman	Queen Hippolyta	
2017	Justice League	Queen Hippolyta	
2018	The Catcher Was a Spy	Koranda	
2019	I'll Find You	Lena Moser Drabowski	
2019	Sea Fever	Freya	
2020	Inheritance	Catherine Monroe	
2020	Wonder Woman 1984	Queen Hippolyta	
2021	Zack Snyder's Justice League	Queen Hippolyta	
2021	Nobody	Rebecca "Becca" Mansell	
2022	A Week in Paradise	Fiona	
2023	Origin	Sabine	
2023	Ocean Deep	Mara	
2024	Role Play	Gwen Carver	
2024	Gladiator II	Lucilla	
2025	Nobody 2	Rebecca "Becca" Mansell	

=== Television films ===
Year	Title	Role
1993	Voyage	Ronnie Freeland
1994	Le paradis absolument	Sarah
2008	Danny Fricke	Danny Fricke
2015	Unveiled	Joan McAllen

=== Television series ===
Year	Title	Role	Notes
1988	Colletti bianchi	Marilù Bacchetta	Television Series; 12 Episodes
1994	Okavango – The Wild Frontier	Lena	Television Series; 16 Episodes
2006	Law & Order: Special Victims Unit	Detective Dani Beck	6 episodes
2011–2012	Boss	Meredith Rutledge Kane	16 episodes
2014	The Following	Lily Gray	10 episodes
2014–2015	The Good Wife	Ramona Lytton	4 episodes
2018	FBI	Ellen Solberg	Episode: "Pilot"
2018	Liberty	Katrina	5 episodes
2019	I Am the Night	Corinna Hodel	6 episodes
2021	Close to Me	Jo Harding	6 episodes
2022	The Dreamer – Becoming Karen Blixen	Karen Blixen	6 episodes
2025	Robin Hood	Eleanor of Aquitaine	

=== Music Videos ===
Year	Artist	Title	Role
1985	Arcadia	Election Day	Girl dance

== Awards ==
- Rungstedlund Prize (4 September 2023).
