= Plus One (2019 film) =

- Theatrical release poster
- Directed by: Jeff Chan; Andrew Rhymer
- Written by: Jeff Chan; Andrew Rhymer
- Produced by: Deborah Liebling; Ross Putman; Jeremy Reitz; Jeff Chan; Andrew Rhymer; Greg Beauchamp
- Starring: Maya Erskine; Jack Quaid; Beck Bennett; Rosalind Chao; Perrey Reeves; Ed Begley Jr.
- Cinematography: Guy Godfree
- Edited by: John Daigle
- Music by: Leo Birenberg
- Production companies: Red Hour Productions; Studio 71; Bindery Films
- Distributed by: RLJE Films
- Release dates: April 28, 2019 (Tribeca); June 14, 2019 (United States)
- Running time: 98 minutes
- Country: United States
- Language: English
- Box office: $44,112

Plus One is a 2019 American romantic comedy film, written, directed, and produced by Jeff Chan and Andrew Rhymer. Starring Maya Erskine, Jack Quaid, Beck Bennett, Rosalind Chao, Perrey Reeves, and Ed Begley Jr., the film follows two longtime single friends who agree to be each other's plus one at every wedding they're invited to.

The film premiered at the Tribeca Film Festival on April 28, 2019, where it won the Narrative Audience Award, and was released on June 14, 2019 by RLJE Films. It received generally positive reviews from critics.

== Plot ==
Ben King and Alice Mori, friends from college and now in their late twenties, separately attend a wedding between their friends, Matt and Amanda. Having recently broken up with her boyfriend, Nate, Alice gets drunk.

Ben is fixated on former classmate Jess Ramsey and hopes to establish a romantic relationship with her. However, he embarrasses himself when she rebuffs his attempt to kiss her, as she is engaged. At the hotel, Ben and Alice vent their frustrations of having to navigate wedding season alone and decide to help one another by becoming each other's dates. Alice also agrees to help Ben meet women at the weddings.

Ben goes golfing with his dad, Chuck, who has proposed to his much younger girlfriend, Gina, asking Ben to be his best man. Citing Chuck's two previous failed marriages, Ben suggests his dad take some time to think about his decision.

Alice uses blunt approaches to introduce Ben to various single women at the weddings, one of which culminates in Ben having a one-night-stand. However, he says that he thinks he won't pursue anything further, remaining fixated on finding the "perfect" relationship instead of having casual flings.

After another wedding, Ben and Alice are forced to share a bed. When she attempts to cuddle with him, he feels uncomfortable. The pair attend a wedding for one of Ben's family members, and he and Alice nearly drunkenly kiss in the pool after a deep conversation.

In the conversation, Alice learns that Ben has been asked to be his dad's best man, and expresses concern as to why he did not tell her or accept the offer. He expresses his frustrations with his dad, explaining he still feels resentment over his parents' divorce. Alice tells him that her parents are only remaining together for her and her sister despite their clear displeasure with each other, which is not better.

They miss the shuttle back to the hotel and are forced to walk, eventually cutting through a cemetery. They run through the cemetery together, but Alice trips and cuts her arm. As Ben helps her, they embrace and have sex. The pair awkwardly have breakfast the following morning and decide not to discuss the previous night.

Weeks later, Ben and Alice travel to Hawaii for a destination wedding and acknowledge their mutual feelings, having sex again. The pair decide to become formally romantically involved. Ben later gains Alice's parents' approval after helping make her sister's wedding a success.

As Ben and Alice attend another wedding, they get into an argument over her forgetting the wedding gift, her nonchalant attitude frustrating Ben. Ben steps outside to cool off so they don't fight publicly. Outside of the wedding, Alice confronts Ben and asks why he's so frustrated. He confesses that he's been having doubts about their relationship. Alice tells Ben that she loves him, but Ben can only tell Alice "I don't know" when asked if he loves her back. Alice tells Ben that he's not a good person and walks away, their relationship ending.

Ben attends the remainder of weddings alone and makes a drunken fool of himself at one of them, prompting his friend, Matt, to intervene. After some discussion about marriage not requiring 100% certainty that the relationship will work out, Ben realizes his mistake and shows up to a wedding Alice previously invited him to, finding that she is back with Nate. He attempts to explain himself to her and professes his love, but before she can respond, Nate finds her and the two return to the wedding.

Later that night, Chuck calls Ben for a ride after taking acid during his bachelor party. Ben tells his father that his divorce is why Ben is so fixated on finding the perfect person, not wanting to make a mistake and wind up alone. Chuck explains that even though his previous marriages have failed, they still led to great things, like Ben.

At Chuck's wedding, Ben, as the best man, gives a heartfelt speech to his dad and his new stepmother Gina. During the speech, the camera pans to reveal that Alice is there too. It's revealed that when Ben returns home after helping his father, he finds Alice waiting for him. They kiss and get back together.

== Cast ==
- Maya Erskine as Alice Mori
- Jack Quaid as Ben King
- Ed Begley Jr. as Chuck
- Rosalind Chao as Angela
- Beck Bennett as Matt
- Finn Wittrock as Steve
- Jon Bass as Cartelli
- Jessy Hodges as Amanda
- Emma Bell as Perfect Maid of Honor
- Perrey Reeves as Gina
- Jeff Ward as Trevor
- Maya Kazan as Shaina
- Allan Havey as Hannon
- Tom Virtue as Officiant
- Felisha Cooper as Kara
- Tim Chiou as Nate
- Max Jenkins as Nick
- Anna Konkle as Jenna
- Brianne Howey as Jess Ramsey
- Victoria Park as Lily Mori

== Production ==
In November 2017, it was announced Maya Erskine, Jack Quaid, Ed Begley Jr., Finn Wittrock, Rosalind Chao, Perrey Reeves, Beck Bennett and Jon Bass had joined the cast of the film, with Jeff Chan and Andrew Rhymer directing from a screenplay they wrote. Ben Stiller, Nicholas Weinstock and Jackie Cohn served as executive producers under their Red Hour Films banner. Stu Pollard and Harris McCabe from Lunacy Productions also executive produced. James Short and John Short with Inwood Road Films also served as executive producers.

== Release ==
The film had its world premiere at the Tribeca Film Festival on April 28, 2019 and went on to win the Narrative Audience Award. Prior to, RLJE Films acquired distribution rights to the film. It was released in select theaters, VOD and Digital HD on June 14, 2019. It was released on Hulu on August 6, 2019.

== Reception ==
On Rotten Tomatoes, the film has an approval rating of 88% based on 64 reviews, with an average rating of 7.1/10. The website's critical consensus reads, "Plus One reinvigorates the rom-com with an entertaining outing elevated by well-matched leads and a story that embraces and transcends genre clichés." On Metacritic the film has a weighted average score of 65 out of 100 based on 18 critics, indicating "generally favorable reviews".

Nick Schager of Variety praised Maya Erskine's performance and called the film one "genre fans won’t want to miss". Ben Kenigsberg of The New York Times said that "Every minute Erskine is not on a screen is a minute wasted", while Jon Frosch of The Hollywood Reporter called Plus One a "modest rom-com that coasts on charm and chemistry".

Peter Bradshaw of The Guardian gave the film 2 out of 5 stars and suggested that "[Plus One needs] bigger laughs and more of the big, ironic comedy that Erskine can clearly deliver". Wendy Ide of The Observer gave Plus One a 4 out of 5 rating, saying that the film is "a predictable odd-couple romance" which is "given extra zest by the fantastic on-screen chemistry of its leads".
