= Solntsevskaya Bratva =

Russian organized crime group

- Founder: Sergei Mikhailov
- Founding location: Solntsevo District, Moscow, Russian SFSR, Soviet Union
- Years active: Late 1980s – present
- Territory: Russia: Moscow, Saint Petersburg, Kazan, Volgograd, Nizhny Novgorod, Perm, Ufa, Yekaterinburg, Chelyabinsk, Voronezh, Rostov-on-Don. Outside Russia its also present in: Ukraine, Israel, United Kingdom, France, Spain, Hungary, United States.
- Ethnicity: Predominantly Russians, Russian Jews and Ukrainians
- Membership: c.800 members
- Criminal activities: Racketeering, extortion, illegal gambling, arms trafficking, human trafficking, prostitution, drug trafficking, robbery, arson, bribery, money laundering, fraud, murder, assault, kidnapping, white-collar crime
- Allies: Orekhovskaya gang (defunct); Bulgarian mafia Serbian mafia Business partnerships with: Colombian cartels Chinese Triads; Sicilian Mafia; Camorra 'Ndrangheta

The Solntsevskaya Organized Crime Group (Russian: Солнцевская организованная преступная группировка), also known as the Solntsevskaya Bratva (Russian: Солнцевская братва), is a Russian crime syndicate group.

Other simplified versions of the name are Solntsevskaya Brotherhood and Solntsevskaya gang.

== Rise to power ==
The Solntsevskaya gang was founded in Russian SFSR in the late 1980s by Sergei Mikhailov, a former waiter who had served a prison term for fraud, and Viktor Averin. Based in the Solntsevo District of Moscow, the gang recruited local unemployed, aggressive young men as foot soldiers and also made use of thief in law Dzhemal Khachidze to enhance their reputation amongst established criminals. The Solntsevo District was also strategically located near the M3 highway leading to Ukraine, the MKAD, Moscow's ring road, as well as the Vnukovo International Airport. Controlling these transport hubs allowed the Solntsevo group to muscle in on the car import business. But by the early 1990s, the Solntsevo's dominance was challenged by the Chechen mafia. Together with the Orekhovskaya gang and other Slavic mobs, the Solntsevo made an alliance to drive the Chechens out. The gang war claimed many casualties, such as a gun battle at the Kazakhstan Cinema where six Chechens and four Russians were killed. After the Soviet Union collapsed, the gang utilized the chaos to empower themselves by establishing relationships with politicians. They were now able to influence the Russian state for their own benefit. They also bought several legitimate businesses to launder their money including banks, casinos, and even the Vnukovo airport.

The gang was at one point linked to criminal mastermind Semion Mogilevich, through whom they laundered money. But a 1995 party at a Prague hotel, attended by Mikhailov as well as Uzbek drug trafficker Gafur Rakhimov, was raided by Czech police who received information that they were planning to kill Mogilevich there following a dispute. Mogilevich himself was nowhere to be found, having received advance information about both groups' intentions.

By the end of the 1990s, the Solntsevskaya gang started moving into the banking sector, a move which enabled them to launder their money as well as get closer to the oligarchs.

== Activity overseas ==
In the 1990s, the Solntsevskaya dispatched Vyacheslav Ivankov to Brighton Beach, New York City, and Mikhail Odenussa to Atlanta, Georgia, to take control of the Russian mob activities there. The FBI was alerted to Ivankov's presence, however, and after a long investigation he was arrested and convicted of extortion, becoming the first thief-in-law to be convicted in the United States. While Ivankov was not as successful, his counterpart Odenussa has been controlling Russian organized crime in Atlanta for over 20 years, while avoiding prosecution. Odenussa has had a firm grip on the city, with an army of killers to back him up. Although not as large as the drug cartels of Mexico that have sent men to try and set up shop in Atlanta, Odenussa and his cohorts have out-gunned the Mexican drug cartels and the African American gangs in Atlanta. The Solntsevskaya have also been active in Israel, primarily using it as a base for money laundering. But attempts to infiltrate Israeli politics were countered by vigilant law enforcement.

Doktor's Bratvavor Is a subdivision of the Solntsevskaya Bratva, being independently operated and headed by the notorious Doktor Spatz, after his refusal to submit to Odenussa's order, and an agreement was reached to form an alliance between the groups. Spatz singlehandedly controls a large portion of upstate New York, encompassing large cities such as Rochester and Syracuse, outnumbering the African American and Mexican street gangs of the area.

The organization is also involved in the international cocaine trade, with its links to Colombian drug cartels brokered by the Cuntrera-Caruana Mafia clan.

Viktor Averin, co-founder and former leader, drowned on the evening of December 20, 2025 after a boat capsized in a layer of ice during a maneuver in the Admiral marina in the Mytishchi district near Moscow.

== Current status and recent activity ==
According to the US, as published during the 2010 Wikileaks scandal, the Solntsevo gang continues racketeering operations under the protection of the FSB, a Russian state security agency. In September 2017, Arnold Tamm was arrested in Marbella, Spain, during the Spanish operation Oligarch (Spanish: operación Oligarca) under suspicion of tax evasion, money laundering, and involvement in the activities of the Solntsevskaya group.

== In popular culture ==
- In the Earth-616 of Marvel Comics multiverse, the Solntsevskaya Bratva is led by Ivan Pushkin (aka Ivan the Terrible) and one of its most prominent members is Anatoly Rasputin, the uncle of the notorious mutants Piotr Rasputin (aka Colossus), member of the X-Men, Illyana Rasputina (aka Magik) and Mikhail Rasputin.
- In the Earth-1610 of Marvel Comics multiverse, Piotr Rasputin (aka Colossus) was a high ranking member of Solntsevskaya Bratva before becoming a member of the Ultimate X-Men.
- The Solntsevskaya Bratva has a recurring role in the CW TV series Arrow. Oliver Queen has contacts in the organization who he uses to locate criminals. In Arrow, the leader of Solntsevskaya Bratva in the Arrowverse is Anatoly Knyazev (a.k.a. KGBeast), one of the biggest supervillains in Arrowverse and the DC Universe (played by David Nykl).

== See also ==
- Tambov gang
- Uralmash gang
- FC Arsenal Kyiv through "Kiev–Donbass"
- The wild nineties
- Obshchak
- Organized crime in Latvia
