= Maya Erskine =

American actress (born 1987)

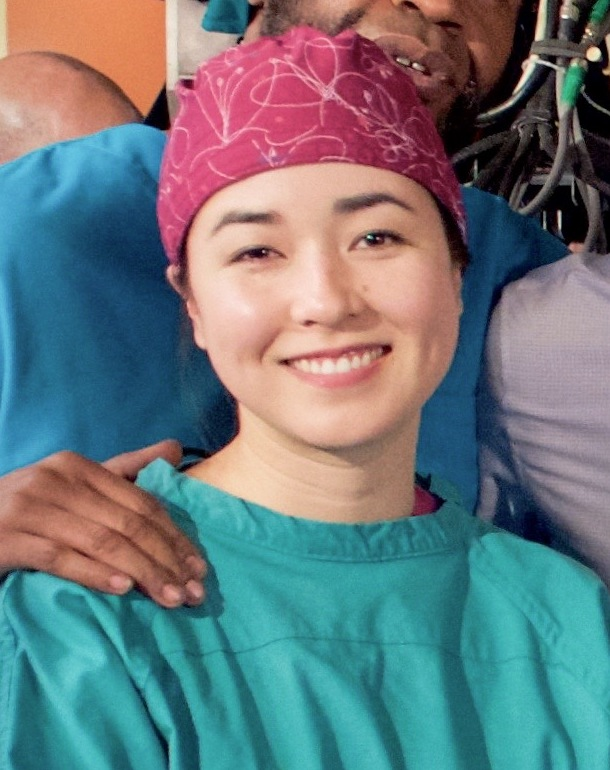
- Erskine on the set of Heartbeat in 2016
- Born: May 7, 1987 (age 39); Los Angeles, California, U.S.
- Education: New York University (BFA)
- Occupation: Actress
- Years active: 2010–present
- Spouse: Michael Angarano (m. 2023)
- Children: 2
- Father: Peter Erskine

Maya Erskine (born May 7, 1987) is an American actress and writer. From 2019 to 2021, she starred in Hulu's original TV comedy series PEN15 alongside Anna Konkle; the duo, who co-created, co-wrote, and co-executive produced the series, played fictional versions of their 13-year-old selves. The series received critical acclaim and was nominated for four Primetime Emmy Awards. Since 2024, she has starred as Jane Smith in the Prime Video spy series Mr. & Mrs. Smith, for which she was nominated for the Primetime Emmy Award for Outstanding Lead Actress in a Drama Series. She also had main roles as Mikki in the Amazon Prime Video sitcom Betas (2013–2014), as Maggie in the FXX romantic comedy series Man Seeking Woman (2015), and as Mizu in the Netflix adult animated action series Blue Eye Samurai (2023).

== Early life and education ==
Erskine was born in Los Angeles, California, on May 7, 1987, the daughter of Mutsuko Nigatawa and jazz drummer Peter Erskine. Her mother is Japanese, from Tokyo. Her mother also plays the role of her character's mother on Pen15.

Erskine attended Crossroads School for Arts & Sciences and graduated from Los Angeles County High School for the Arts. She is a 2005 YoungArts alumnus. She then attended New York University Tisch School of the Arts. Erskine initially studied musical theater but shifted to the school's Experimental Theater Wing. During her time at NYU, she met Anna Konkle while they were both studying abroad at a theater program in Amsterdam.

== Career ==
Erskine has performed with the Los Angeles–based theater groups the East West Players and the Geffen Playhouse. In 2019, she appeared in Amy Poehler's directorial debut, Wine Country, opposite a slate of comedians including Poehler, Maya Rudolph, Tina Fey, and Rachel Dratch. The same year, she began starring in the Hulu series Pen15, which she created with Anna Konkle. She received two Primetime Emmy Award for Outstanding Writing for a Comedy Series nominations for her work on the series. She is recognized by Gold House as the A100 Honoree.

== Personal life ==
In September 2019, she confirmed her relationship with actor Michael Angarano. On November 2, 2020, the couple revealed they were engaged and expecting a child. Their son was born in 2021. In 2024, Erskine revealed that she and Angarano had married. In April 2024, Erskine announced her second pregnancy. Their daughter was born in 2024.

== Filmography ==
Key
†	Denotes films that have not yet been released

=== Film ===
Year	Title	Role	Notes	Ref(s)
2015	Frankenstein	Wanda		
2018	6 Balloons	Cameron		
2018	When Jeff Tried to Save the World	Samantha		
2019	Plus One	Alice Mori		
2019	Wine Country	Jade		
2020	Have a Good Trip: Adventures in Psychedelics	Maya		
2020	Scoob!	Judy Takamoto (voice)		
2022	DC League of Super-Pets	Mercy Graves (voice)		
2024	Sacramento	Tallie		
2025	Smurfs	Vanity (voice)		
2026	Wildwood	Mrs. McKeel (voice)		

=== Television ===
Year	Title	Role	Notes	Ref(s)
2013	Hart of Dixie	Nessie	2 episodes	
2013	Project Reality		Miniseries	
2013	High School USA!	Student (voice)	4 episodes	
2013–2014	Betas	Mikki	Main cast	
2014	Next Time on Lonny	Charika	Episode: "Lonny is Famous"	
2015	Stone Quackers	Various (voice)	2 episodes	
2015	Man Seeking Woman	Maggie	Main cast (season 1)	
2015	Big Time in Hollywood, FL	Venice	Episode: "What Dreams May Come"	
2016	Heartbeat	Ji-Sung	Main cast	
2016	Son of Zorn	April Lee	Episode: "A Taste of Zephyria"	
2016–2017	Insecure	Diane Nakamura	Recurring role (seasons 1–2)	
2017	Michael Bolton's Big, Sexy Valentine's Day Special	Susan	TV special	
2017	Wet Hot American Summer: Ten Years Later	Ginny	3 episodes	
2017–2018	Casual	Rae	Recurring role (seasons 3–4)	
2019–2021	Pen15	Maya Ishii-Peters	Main cast, also creator, writer, and executive producer	
2020	BoJack Horseman	Ivy Tran (voice)	Episode: "Good Damage"	
2020	Robot Chicken	College Girl #3, The Nun (voice)	Episode: "Buster Olive in: The Monkey Got Closer Overnight"	
2020	Big Mouth	Cafeteria Girl Misha (voice)	Episode: "Cafeteria Girls"	
2020–2021	Crossing Swords	Princess Blossom (voice)	Recurring role	
2020–2022	Bob's Burgers	Kaylee (voice)	3 episodes	
2022	Obi-Wan Kenobi	Sully Stark	Miniseries, 3 episodes	
2023–present	Blue Eye Samurai	Mizu (voice)	Main cast	
2024–present	Mr. & Mrs. Smith	Jane Smith	Title role	
