= Man Seeking Woman =

American comedy television series

- Genre: Romantic comedy; Surreal comedy
- Created by: Simon Rich
- Based on: The Last Girlfriend on Earth by Simon Rich
- Starring: Jay Baruchel; Eric André; Britt Lower; Maya Erskine; Katie Findlay
- Opening theme: "Reconstruct" by Photay
- Country of origin: United States
- Original language: English
- No. of seasons: 3
- No. of episodes: 30

Production
- Executive producers: Simon Rich; Jonathan Krisel; Andrew Singer; Lorne Michaels; Ian Maxtone-Graham
- Production locations: Toronto, Ontario, Canada
- Camera setup: Single-camera
- Running time: 18–23 minutes
- Production companies: Broadway Video; Allagash Industries; FXP (Note: Credited as FX Productions for first season)

Original release
- Network: FXX
- Release: January 14, 2015 – March 8, 2017

Man Seeking Woman is an American romantic comedy television series created by Simon Rich for FXX. It originally aired for 3 seasons from January 14, 2015, to March 8, 2017. The series is set in Chicago, about a naïve and soft-spoken man in his 20s named Josh Greenberg (played by Jay Baruchel), who finds himself in several surrealist and awkward circumstances while trying to find love.

The series is based on Rich's short story compilation, The Last Girlfriend on Earth, Jonathan Krisel, Andrew Singer, and Lorne Michaels are also executive producers, with Broadway Video, Allagash Industries and FXP (formerly FX Productions) as production companies. It has received generally positive reviews from critics.

On April 4, 2017, the show was canceled after three seasons.

== Premise ==
Most episode plots are based on relatable conflicts and struggles of entering/maintaining a relationship; however, these conflicts are taken to absurd and literal extremes. The show centers on Josh Greenberg, who struggles finding love after a break-up with his long-term girlfriend Maggie. His mature and successful older sister Liz often tries to help him enter into a serious relationship, and his sex-crazed best friend Mike often tries to help him with solely having sex. Josh's efforts oftentimes lead him into surreal and awkward circumstances such as going on a date with an actual troll, physically misplacing his penis, meeting a Japanese monster composed of human penises, or learning that there is a national abstinence movement among women that is applied to him and no one else. Sometimes Josh is successful in finding a girlfriend; however, these relationships usually only survive for one episode.

== Cast and characters ==
=== Main ===
- Jay Baruchel as Josh Greenberg, a naïve and soft-spoken 27-year-old man working a temp job. He struggles to find love, following a break-up from a long relationship. He is sometimes used as a straight man when absurd and surreal things happen.
- Eric André as Mike Scaggs, Josh's laid-back best friend who has an easier time with girls than Josh. He often attempts to help Josh, however, he is more interested in helping him have sex as opposed to entering into a serious relationship.
- Britt Lower as Liz Greenberg, Josh's protective and caring older sister who also tries to help Josh. Her methods of helping are more rational and down-to-earth than Mike's; they are more driven to getting Josh into a serious relationship. She has a condescending view of Mike, who in turn doesn't seem to have an opinion of her.
- Maya Erskine as Maggie (season 1), Josh's ex-girlfriend, who breaks up with him at the start of the series.
- Katie Findlay as Lucy Parker (season 3), Josh's girlfriend and later wife.

=== Recurring ===
- Robin Duke as Patti Greenberg, Josh and Liz's mother.
- Mark McKinney as Tom Greenberg, Josh and Liz's step-father.
- Jeff Pangman as Charles Powell, Josh's boss.
- Ennis Esmer as Leo (season 1), Liz's boyfriend.
- Rosa Salazar as Rosa Mendes (season 2), a co-worker of Josh's that he and Mike both fall in love with.

== Production ==
On June 19, 2013, FXX ordered a pilot episode for Man Seeking Woman from Simon Rich, directed by Jonathan Krisel. On February 6, 2014, Jay Baruchel was cast as the lead character, Josh Greenberg. On March 20, Eric André, Britt Lower, and Maya Erskine were announced as the remaining principal cast members. On July 2, the network announced it had picked up the series for a 10-episode series order, as well as its principal cast and production crew. On October 31, Miles Fisher was cast in a recurring role. The series is filmed in Toronto, Ontario, Canada. On March 3, 2015, it was renewed for a 10-episode second season. On April 12, 2016, FX announced it was renewed for a 10-episode third season.

== Episodes ==
Season	Episodes	Originally released	
Season	Episodes	First released	Last released
1	10	January 14, 2015	March 18, 2015
2	10	January 6, 2016	March 9, 2016
3	10	January 4, 2017	March 8, 2017

=== Season 1 (2015) ===
No. overall	No. in season	Title	Directed by	Written by	Original release date	Prod. code	U.S. viewers (millions)
1	1	"Lizard"	Jonathan Krisel	Simon Rich	January 14, 2015	XXMK01001	0.326
Josh is dumped by his girlfriend Maggie and has a difficult time moving on. His best friend Mike encourages him to find a new girlfriend. Maggie is now dating Adolf Hitler (Bill Hader). Later, Josh meets a girl, Laura (Vanessa Bayer), on a train and asks for her number.
2	2	"Traib"	Jonathan Krisel	Robert Padnick & Simon Rich	January 21, 2015	XXMK01002	0.185
Josh agonizes over how to ask Laura out to dinner in a text message. She later agrees to dinner, however their first date does not go well. Guest starring Michael Hogan as Bradley.
3	3	"Pitbull"	Ben Berman	Dan Mirk & Simon Rich	January 28, 2015	XXMK01003	0.206
Mike takes Josh out to a club hoping to hook-up, however Josh is insecure and unsure of how to pick-up women. Guest starring Sarah Silverman as Josh's right hand (voice), Eddie Pepitone as Josh's left hand (voice), and Tim Heidecker as a bartender.
4	4	"Dram"	Ben Berman	Sofia Alvarez & Simon Rich	February 4, 2015	XXMK01004	0.205
Josh's sister Liz invites him over for dinner, setting him up for a blind date with a woman named Maude (Maria Thayer). Josh is pressured by his family to settle down with Maude who he just met. Maude is obsessive over Josh, but he does not feel the same way and goes to extreme lengths to avoid her.
5	5	"Sizzurp"	Jonathan Krisel	Robert Padnick	February 11, 2015	XXMK01005	0.098
When Cupid (Jorma Taccone) decides to turn his life around he decides to set up Josh with a "super hot chick" named Whitney (Minka Kelly). Things work well at first but Josh's insecurities take over and he becomes paranoid and jealous of other men she comes in contact with, including Whitney's friend Tanaka (Fred Armisen).
6	6	"Gavel"	Jonathan Krisel	Simon Rich	February 18, 2015	XXMK01006	0.174
Josh enters into a happy relationship with Kayla (Anna Konkle), which is put in jeopardy when Maggie comes back in the picture. Guest starring Marc Evan Jackson as a judge and Jon Daly as Daniel Schultz.
7	7	"Stain"	Tim Kirkby	Ian Maxtone-Graham & Simon Rich	February 25, 2015	XXMK01007	0.210
Josh and Mike attend a wedding in hell. Guest starring Brett Gelman as a Demon.
8	8	"Branzino"	Tim Kirkby	Dan Mirk	March 4, 2015	XXMK01008	0.113
Josh and his girlfriend Rachel (Claire Stollery) decide to be surgically conjoined to each other.
9	9	"Teacup"	Tim Kirkby	Sofia Alvarez	March 11, 2015	XXMK01009	0.218
In a female equivalent of the show's premise, Liz re-renters the dating scene after being dumped.
10	10	"Scepter"	Jonathan Krisel	Ian Maxtone-Graham	March 18, 2015	XXMK01010	0.204
Josh uses time travel pills from a convenience store to go back in time to save his relationship with Maggie.

=== Season 2 (2016) ===
No. overall	No. in season	Title	Directed by	Written by	Original release date	Prod. code	U.S. viewers (millions)
11	1	"Wings"	Daniel Gray Longino	Sofia Alvarez and Simon Rich	January 6, 2016	XXMK02001	0.280
Mike feels neglected when Josh spends time with his new girlfriend Kelly (Sarah Gadon).
12	2	"Feather"	Michael Dowse	Robert Padnick	January 13, 2016	XXMK02002	0.249
Josh falls for a girl (Liane Balaban) with similar interests, but encounters trouble when he can't satisfy her sexually.
13	3	"Scythe"	Dan Schimpf	Dan Mirk and Robert Padnick	January 20, 2016	XXMK02003	0.254
Josh decides to "settle" by dating a car after the Grim Reaper (Chad Camilleri) tells him he will be bald in around three years.
14	4	"Tinsel"	Michael Dowse	Sofia Alvarez	January 27, 2016	XXMK02004	0.176
Another female equivalent of the show's premise, in which Liz carries out an affair with Santa Claus (Peter Giles). Guest starring Robin Givens as Vickie Clause.
15	5	"Card"	Daniel Gray Longino	Robert Padnick	February 3, 2016	XXMK02005	0.251
Josh sets out to achieve his life's dream of being a video game designer.
16	6	"Honey"	Daniel Gray Longino	Dan Mirk	February 10, 2016	XXMK02006	0.169
Josh begins to woo Rosa (Rosa Salazar) from work only to find out who she is dating. Guest starring Fred Armisen as Jesus Christ.
17	7	"Cactus"	Bill Benz	Marika Sawyer	February 17, 2016	XXMK02007	0.207
Josh decides to make a move on a newly single Rosa.
18	8	"Fuse"	Dan Schimpf	Dan Mirk	February 24, 2016	XXMK02008	0.212
Josh becomes jealous when Mike and Rosa start dating.
19	9	"Eel"	Bill Benz	Marika Sawyer	March 2, 2016	XXMK02009	0.154
Difficulties arise in Rosa and Mike's relationship. Guest starring Carrie-Anne Moss as Joan Dillon and Tzi Ma as Master Sheng.
20	10	"Balloon"	Bill Benz	Ian Maxtone-Graham	March 9, 2016	XXMK02010	0.167
Josh gets his chance to be with Rosa.

=== Season 3 (2017) ===
No. overall	No. in season	Title	Directed by	Written by	Original release date	Prod. code	U.S. viewers (millions)
21	1	"Futon"	Rachel Lee Goldenberg	Dan Mirk	January 4, 2017	XXMK03001	0.239
Josh begins a happy relationship with Lucy (Katie Findlay), but not without their own share of problems.
22	2	"Ranch"	Michael Dowse	Mike O'Brien	January 11, 2017	XXMK03002	0.230
Lucy meets Josh's parents and in the process Josh's mom gets overly attached to the couple.
23	3	"Horse"	Andrew DeYoung	Mike O'Brien	January 18, 2017	XXMK03003	0.195
Lucy tries to bond with Mike, with some horrible consequences.
24	4	"Popcorn"	Ryan Case	Jason Belleville	January 25, 2017	XXMK03004	0.202
Lucy takes Josh to meet her passive-aggressive parents, but Josh ends up befriending them much to Lucy's dismay.
25	5	"Shrimp"	Andrew DeYoung	Jason Belleville	February 1, 2017	XXMK03005	0.192
Josh meets Lucy's new friends and feels unsuccessful as all her friends have fancy and interesting jobs.
26	6	"Pad Thai"	Rachel Lee Goldenberg	Cirocco Dunlap	February 8, 2017	XXMK03006	0.193
Josh and Lucy are together after a year, but are stuck in a rut. Lucy seeks new adventures.
27	7	"Bagel"	Ryan Case	Stefani Robinson	February 15, 2017	XXMK03007	0.161
After asking blessings of Lucy's parents, Josh plans to propose to her.
28	8	"Dolphin"	Michael Dowse	Stefani Robinson	February 22, 2017	XXMK03008	0.241
Josh tells his mother and step-father that he and Lucy are getting married. Liz seeks out her estranged father (Peter Gallagher).
29	9	"Cake"	Michael Dowse	Aaron Burdette	March 1, 2017	XXMK03009	0.198
Mike throws Josh a bachelor party.
30	10	"Blood"	Michael Dowse	Dan Mirk	March 8, 2017	XXMK03010	0.241
Josh and Lucy get married, however, their parents conspire to transform their unique wedding into a more traditional one.

== Reception ==
Man Seeking Woman has been met with positive reviews from critics. Rotten Tomatoes gives the first season of the show a rating of 82%, based on 33 reviews, with an average rating of 6.7/10. The site's critical consensus states, "Amusingly surrealistic and enjoyably odd, Man Seeking Woman is easy to fall for, taking a ridiculously funny approach to a common theme." On Metacritic, the season has a score of 66 out of 100, based on 27 critics, indicating "generally favorable reviews".

The second season received positive reviews. On Rotten Tomatoes, it has a rating of 100% based on 8 reviews with an average rating of 8/10.

The third season also received positive reviews. On Rotten Tomatoes, it has a rating of 100% based on 13 reviews with an average rating of 8.8/10. The site's critical consensus states, "Man Seeking Woman explores new avenues of storytelling in season 3, while maintaining its excellent absurdist humor and imaginative dealings with relatable relationship issues." On Metacritic, the season has a score of 89 out of 100, based on 5 critics, indicating "universal acclaim".
