= Big Boys (film) =

2023 film by Corey Sherman

- Theatrical release poster
- Directed by: Corey Sherman
- Written by: Corey Sherman
- Produced by: Allison Tate; Corey Sherman
- Starring: Isaac Krasner; Dora Madison; David Johnson III; Taj Cross; Emily Deschanel
- Cinematography: Gus Bendinelli
- Edited by: Erik Vogt-Nilsen; Corey Sherman
- Music by: Will Wiesenfeld
- Production companies: Perfect Dog Pictures; The Film Collaborative
- Distributed by: Dark Star Pictures
- Release dates: March 18, 2023 (BFI Flare); May 31, 2024 (United States)
- Running time: 89 minutes
- Country: United States
- Language: English

Big Boys is a 2023 American coming-of-age comedy film written, directed, co-produced, and co-edited by Corey Sherman (in his feature directorial debut). It stars Isaac Krasner as a teenage boy who develops an unexpected crush on his cousin's new boyfriend during a camping trip. Dora Madison, David Johnson III, Taj Cross, and Emily Deschanel appear in supporting roles.

The film had its world premiere at the 37th BFI Flare: London LGBTIQ+ Film Festival on March 18, 2023, and was theatrically released in the United States on May 31, 2024, by Dark Star Pictures. The film was universally acclaimed by critics, who praised Krasner's performance and Sherman's direction. At the 40th Independent Spirit Awards, it was nominated for Best Breakthrough Performance (for Krasner) and the John Cassavetes Award.

== Plot ==
Jamie, a 14-year-old culinary enthusiast, sets out on a weekend camping trip with his older brother Will and their cousin Allie. Jamie is disheartened when he learns Allie's new boyfriend, Dan, will be joining them — until Dan turns out to be charming, friendly, and — as he puts it — a big boy, like Jamie. While Will chats sports with Dan and mocks Jamie's love of cooking shows, Dan takes notice of the younger boy's discomfort and steps in with quiet support.

Dan helps Jamie set up camp, encourages his interests, and treats him with kindness that stands in stark contrast to Will's teasing. Their bond strengthens over shared games and cooking, gradually drawing Jamie out of his shell. Allie, meanwhile, wrestles with mixed emotions — proud to see Jamie connect with someone, but also slightly sidelined in her own relationship.

A late-night encounter where Will enlists Jamie to help sneak out and meet girls reveals Jamie's inner conflict. While Will flirts with a conventionally attractive girl, Jamie awkwardly avoids intimacy with her friend, unsure of his feelings. Throughout the trip, Jamie becomes increasingly fixated on Dan, whose gentle attention and empathy — including an open conversation about being teased by older brothers — stir something deeper in the teen.

Their connection deepens during a hike gone awry, which strands them together in the woods. The dynamic briefly shifts as Jamie takes initiative; then Jamie falls and Dan tends to him. These experiences leave a lasting impact, prompting Jamie to reflect on his identity and feelings.

In the final scene, as the group returns home, Jamie musters the courage to speak privately with Dan. Their conversation is quiet but meaningful, offering Jamie a moment of affirmation.

== Cast ==
- Isaac Krasner as Jamie
- David Johnson III as Dan
- Dora Madison Burge as Allie
- Taj Cross as Will
- Emily Deschanel as Nicole
- Marion Van Cuyck as Erika
- Emma Broz as Quinn
- Jack De Sanz as Fantasy Jamie

== Production ==
In an interview on March 17, 2023, Corey Sherman shared that the idea of Big Boys came to him in May 2021 while he was on a road trip with his brother and his dad. He also added that he shared the initial draft of the screenplay with his friend Allison Tate, who would be one of the producers of Big Boys. They began to work with the people that they had to worked with in college. Filming began in the summer of 2022 in the San Bernardino Mountains in Southern California.

Corey added:

I’m so glad that that comes through. I mean, I so wanted the movie to feel fun and genuine. I wanted it to capture the memories I had of vacations with my family as a kid, especially in the brotherly dynamic between Jamie (Isaac Krasner) and Will (Taj Cross).

== Release ==
The film premiered at BFI Flare: London LGBTIQ+ Film Festival on March 18, 2023, Provincetown International Film Festival on June 15, 2023, Outfest LA Film Festival on July 22, 2023, It also premiered at Cleveland International Film Festival on April 9, 2024, and had a limited release in the United States on May 31, 2024.

=== Home media ===
The film was released on Video on demand (VOD) platforms in the US on June 11, 2024. It is also available in Asia (except Japan, South Korea and China) on GagaOOLala.

== Reception ==
On the review aggregator website Rotten Tomatoes, 100% of 31 critics' reviews are positive, with an average rating of 7.60/10. Metacritic, which uses a weighted average, assigned the film a score of 80 out of 100, based on 4 critics, indicating "Generally Favorable" reviews.

Peter Debruge of Variety gave the film positive feedback and said, "Corey Sherman’s deliciously uncomfortable debut features a lot of the usual ingredients: a misfit teenage protagonist, a transformative couple days (in this case, a 'cousins' camping trip' to Lake Arrowhead), a series of embarrassing but life-altering experiences. But I hadn't seen anyone like his main character at the center of a movie before and loved how awkwardly this kid navigates trying to figure himself out."

Ryan Gilbey of The Guardian gave the film 5 out of 5 stars and wrote, "With its come-on of a title, its coming-of-age narrative and its teen hero on the verge of coming out, Big Boys sounds like the sort of LGBTQIA+ fare that grows on trees. In fact, this debut from the writer-director Corey Sherman is a real four-leaf clover: delicate, unique and subtly magical."

David Rooney of The Hollywood Reporter gave the film a positive review and said, "The film captures with enormous sweetness feelings probably familiar to many queer adolescents still figuring out who they are — of insecurity, questioning and giddy crushes on frequently unattainable objects of desire."

=== Accolades ===
| Year | Awards | Category | Recipient | Result | Ref. |
|---|---|---|---|---|---|
| 2025 | GLAAD Media Awards | Outstanding Film – Limited Release | Big Boys | Nominated | |
| 2024 | Independent Spirit Awards | Best Breakthrough Performance | Isaac Krasner | Nominated | |
| 2024 | Independent Spirit Awards | John Cassavetes Award | Corey Sherman, Allison Tate | Nominated | |
| 2024 | Cleveland International Film Festival | American Independents Competition | Big Boys | Nominated | |
| 2024 | Palm Springs International Film Festival | Young Cineastes Award | Corey Sherman | Nominated | |
| 2023 | L.A Outfest | Grand Jury Prize for Outstanding Performance, North American Narrative Feature | Isaac Krasner | Won | |
| 2023 | L.A Outfest | Audience Award for Best Narrative Feature | Corey Sherman | Won | |
| 2023 | FilmOut San Diego Film Festival | Best Actor | Isaac Krasner | Won | |
| 2023 | Frameline Film Festival | Honorable Mention for First Feature | Corey Sherman | Won | |
| 2023 | Sofia Pride Film Festival | Audience Award | Corey Sherman | Nominated | |
