= Nobody (2021 film) =

American action film by Ilya Naishuller

- Theatrical release poster
- Directed by: Ilya Naishuller
- Written by: Derek Kolstad
- Produced by: David Leitch; Kelly McCormick; Braden Aftergood; Bob Odenkirk; Marc Provissiero
- Starring: Bob Odenkirk; Connie Nielsen; Aleksei Serebryakov; RZA; Christopher Lloyd
- Cinematography: Pawel Pogorzelski
- Edited by: William Yeh; Evan Schiff
- Music by: David Buckley
- Production companies: Perfect World Pictures; 87North Productions; Eighty Two Films; Odenkirk Provissiero Entertainment
- Distributed by: Universal Pictures
- Release date: March 26, 2021 (United States)
- Running time: 92 minutes
- Country: United States
- Language: English
- Budget: $16 million
- Box office: $57.5 million

Nobody is a 2021 American action thriller film directed by Ilya Naishuller and written by Derek Kolstad. The film stars Bob Odenkirk as a mild-mannered family man who returns to his former life of an assassin after he and his family become the target of a vengeful crime lord. Connie Nielsen, RZA, Aleksei Serebryakov, and Christopher Lloyd appear in supporting roles. Odenkirk and David Leitch are among the film's producers.

Universal Pictures released Nobody theatrically in the United States on March 26, 2021. The film grossed $57 million on a $16 million budget and received generally positive reviews from critics, who praised the action sequences and Odenkirk's performance. A sequel, Nobody 2, was released on August 15, 2025.

== Plot ==
In an interrogation room, a heavily bruised and injured Hutch Mansell is interrogated about his identity by two FBI agents; Hutch responds that he is simply "nobody".

In a flashback, Hutch leads an ordinary life as an office worker with his emotionally estranged wife Becca, teenage son Brady, and young daughter Sammy. One night, two thieves break into their house with a gun. Brady and Hutch confront them, but Hutch does not attack them with a golf club, and the thieves leave with Hutch's watch and some cash.

Everyone thinks Hutch is a failure for not fighting, but he tells his brother Harry that he held back because he knew the burglar's gun was unloaded. Hutch offers to buy out his father-in-law Eddie's business, but Eddie considers it a bad offer. The following evening, Sammy realizes her cat bracelet is missing, so Hutch sets out to find it. He tracks the burglars down and demands they return the bracelet, but leaves after realizing they do not have it and likely turned to robbery to pay for their infant's medical bills.

While he is on a bus heading home, some intoxicated thugs board and begin harassing a young woman; Hutch calmly but brutally fights them off. Unbeknownst to him, the group's leader, Teddy, is the brother of Yulian Kuznetsov, a Russian crime lord safeguarding obshchak money (a common treasury used to settle disputes in the Russian mafia). Hutch breaks Teddy's windpipe before performing a crude cricothyrotomy with a straw to allow him to breathe, but he falls into a coma and has permanent brain damage, enraging Yulian. Hutch returns home and is bandaged by Becca, who knows of his past. He vents his frustrations about living a mundane life to her before they reaffirm their love for one another.

Meanwhile, Yulian identifies and locates Hutch using his dropped metro card, and sends a team to his home to capture him, while blackmailing a Department of Defense official to uncover Hutch's past. Harry calls Hutch to warn him of Teddy's connection to Yulian and suggests he check with the Barber, Hutch's former government handler. When the mobsters arrive, Hutch hides his family and kills most of the attackers, but is tased and captured. While being transported in the trunk of a car, Hutch sprays a fire extinguisher into the car, causing a crash that kills his kidnappers. Hutch returns home, sends his family away to safety, and informs the mortally injured attackers that he is a former "auditor", an assassin employed by the United States Intelligence Community. On one job in Europe, Hutch spared a repentant target who later reformed and lived happily with a new family; wanting a similar peaceful life, Hutch retired.

Hutch find's Sammy's cat bracelet under the couch, then retrieves a cache of gold and money, burns the house down to hide all evidence, and steals his neighbor's Dodge Challenger. Two assassins attempt to kill Hutch's father, David, at his retirement home, but David, a retired FBI agent, discreetly kills them. Hutch uses his gold to buy his father-in-law's metal fabrication factory and booby traps the building before attacking the Russian mafia's headquarters and burning Yulian's obshchak money, taking only the painting Bedroom in Arles. Hutch visits Yulian at his club with a Claymore mine to protect his life and offers one last chance to end the fighting, but Yulian refuses.

Hutch is pursued by Yulian and his men to the factory, where he is met by Harry and David, who help Hutch kill waves of mobsters. Yulian wounds Harry. Out of ammunition, Hutch rushes Yulian with the claymore taped to a panel of bulletproof glass; the explosion kills Yulian and injures Hutch.

The police take Hutch into custody, ending the flashback. The agents receive simultaneous phone calls, and Hutch is released without charge. Three months later, Hutch and his family have returned to everyday life and are buying a new house, when Hutch receives a call hinting that more trouble may be on the way.

In a mid-credits scene, David and Harry are shown carrying guns in their family campervan.

== Cast ==
- Bob Odenkirk as Hutch Mansell, a former government assassin also known as "Nobody".
- Aleksei Serebryakov as Yulian Kuznetsov, a Russian mafia boss guarding Obshchak, who is targeting Hutch and his family.
- Connie Nielsen as Becca Mansell, Eddie's daughter and Hutch's successful wife.
- Christopher Lloyd as David Mansell, Hutch and Harry's father, and a retired FBI agent.
- Michael Ironside as Eddie Williams, Hutch's father-in-law and boss.
- Colin Salmon as the Barber, Hutch's former government handler.
- RZA as Harry Mansell, Hutch's adopted brother.
- Billy MacLellan as Charlie Williams, Eddie's son and Hutch's brother-in-law.
- Araya Mengesha as Pavel, Yulian's half-Russian, half-Ethiopian bodyguard.
- Gage Munroe as Brady Mansell, Hutch's teenage son.
- Paisley Cadorath as Sammy Mansell, Hutch's daughter.
- Aleksandr Pal as Teddy Kuznetsov, Yulian's younger brother.

Additionally, Humberly González and Edsson Morales portray Lupita and Luis Martin, the thieves who break into Hutch's home. Daniel Bernhardt, Alain Moussi, and Stéphane Julien act as Teddy's thugs on the bus, while Megan Best plays the young woman. J. P. Manoux plays a Pentagon employee who is blackmailed by the Russian mafia. Kristen Harris and Erik Athavale portray the FBI agents in Hutch's interrogation. Director Ilya Naishuller and musician Sergey Shnurov appear as Anatoly and Valentin, respectively, the hitmen killed by David.

== Production ==
In January 2018, Bob Odenkirk was announced to be set to star in the film, with Ilya Naishuller directing from a screenplay by Derek Kolstad. Odenkirk also served as a producer, alongside David Leitch. Kolstad executive produced, along with Marc S. Fischer, Annie Marter, and Tobey Maguire. STX Entertainment was set to distribute the film. In April 2019, Universal Pictures acquired distribution rights to the film from STX as part of an overall first-look deal with 87North Productions. In October 2019, Connie Nielsen and Christopher Lloyd also joined the cast. Odenkirk spent two years training with stuntman Daniel Bernhardt for the role and avoided bulking up as he didn't want to look like a superhero.

Principal photography began in Los Angeles in September 2019. Production moved to Winnipeg, Manitoba in October 2019. Filming lasted 34 days.

== Release ==
Nobody was originally scheduled to be theatrically released in the United States on August 14, 2020, by Universal Pictures. After being repeatedly rescheduled due to the COVID-19 pandemic, the film was ultimately released in theaters on March 26, 2021. The film was released in the United Kingdom on June 9, 2021.

The film was released digitally via premium video-on-demand on April 15, 2021, on digital on June 8, 2021, and on DVD and Blu-Ray on June 22, 2021. The film became available on HBO Max on January 21, 2022, and as part of the streaming deal for Universal Pictures, the film permanently left the library on March 31, 2023.

== Reception ==
=== Box office ===
Nobody grossed $27.6 million in the United States and Canada, and $29.9 million in other territories, for a worldwide total of $57.5 million, against a production budget of $16 million.

A week prior to its United States release, Variety estimated the film would gross around $5 million in its opening weekend, compared to its expectation that it would have opened to around $15 million in a pre-COVID marketplace. The film made $2.5 million on its first day, and went on to debut to $6.7 million, topping the box office. Of the audience, 62% was male, with 56% being under the age of 35. The film fell 56% to $3 million in its second weekend, finishing third.

=== Critical response ===
Review aggregator Rotten Tomatoes reports that 84% of 282 critics have given the film a positive review, with an average rating of 7/10. The website's critics' consensus reads, "Nobody doesn't break any new ground for the genre, but this viscerally violent thriller smashes, shatters, and destroys plenty of other things – all while proving Bob Odenkirk has what it takes to be an action star." On Metacritic, the film has a weighted average score of 64 out of 100 based on 43 critics, indicating "generally favorable reviews". Audiences polled by CinemaScore gave the film an average grade of "A−" on an A+ to F scale, while PostTrak reported 83% of audience members gave it a positive score, with 69% saying they would definitely recommend it.

The Hollywood Reporter's John DeFore praised the film's "enjoyably absurd violence", and wrote, "Taking itself much less seriously than the Taken series and its predecessors, it's a wish-fulfillment romp just as ludicrous as any of them, but more fun than most." Richard Roeper of the Chicago Sun-Times gave the film 3 out of 4 stars, writing, "Most impressive of all is Odenkirk, who looks and sounds nothing like an action star until it's time for Hutch to become an action star, and we totally believe this physically unimpressive, normally mild-mannered guy as a simmering cauldron of rage who could take that teapot over there and kill ya with it."

== Future ==
=== Sequel ===
In March 2021, Connie Nielsen expressed interest in reprising her role for a sequel. The actress stated that she would like to learn more about Hutch and Becca's backstory, while stating that discussions regarding how the two characters met took place on the set of the first film. In June of the same year, it was announced that Kolstad was in the process of writing a sequel, although it had yet to be green-lit by the studio. In March 2022, 87North Productions announced on social media that the studio was looking forward to working on Nobody 2, though no official production date was announced at that time. By August of the same year, Leitch confirmed that work on the script was ongoing, while stating that the studio had committed to releasing a sequel.

In December 2022, McCormick announced that a sequel was officially happening, with principal photography scheduled for 2023. In January 2024, Nielsen confirmed that developments on the sequel were ongoing while confirming that she would reprise her role from the first installment. In March 2024, producer David Leitch confirmed production was set to begin by the end of 2024. In June 2024, Timo Tjahjanto was confirmed to be directing the sequel from a script written by Derek Kolstad and Aaron Rabin, with literary contributions from Umair Aleem and Odenkirk, the latter reprising his role, as well. In July 2024, Sharon Stone was confirmed to have been cast in the sequel along with an August 15, 2025, release date.

=== Potential crossover ===
In March 2021, Kolstad was asked about the potential for a crossover between the John Wick franchise and Nobody. As the films are distributed by different companies (Lionsgate and Universal, respectively), Kolstad indicated this was unlikely and stated the franchises were "very different"; at most, he would like to see it done in a small and subtle Easter egg-reference manner. Later that month, director Ilya Naishuller was asked about a potential crossover, and pointing out that two different studios are involved, said, "That's all I'll say. I mean, everything's possible. Stranger things have definitely happened, but... yeah."

In June 2021, Kolstad stated that if any crossover occurred, he would prefer it in a minimalist fashion, and opined that he would prefer John Wick and Hutch Mansell be on the same side should the characters share more screen time.
