= Frankenstein's Monster's Monster, Frankenstein =

- Film poster
- Directed by: Daniel Gray Longino
- Written by: John Levenstein
- Produced by: Nathan Reinhart; Erin Owens
- Starring: David Harbour; Alex Ozerov; Kate Berlant; Mary Woronov; Alfred Molina; Heather Lawless; Michael Lerner; Marion Van Cuyck
- Cinematography: Carl Herse
- Edited by: Santiago Pedroza
- Music by: Michael Penn
- Production companies: Levenstein Harbour Longino; A24
- Distributed by: Netflix
- Release date: July 16, 2019
- Running time: 32 minutes
- Country: United States
- Language: English

Frankenstein's Monster's Monster, Frankenstein is a surreal comedy mockumentary short film directed by Daniel Gray Longino, written by John Levenstein, and starring David Harbour, Alex Ozerov, Kate Berlant, Mary Woronov, Alfred Molina, Marion Van Cuyck and Heather Lawless. It was released on Netflix on July 16, 2019.

The film also marks the final film role of actor Michael Lerner, before his death in 2023.

== Cast ==
- David Harbour as David Harbour III, an actor investigating the life of his father, David Harbour Jr.
  - Harbour also plays David Harbour Jr., an eccentric actor who portrayed Dr. Frankenstein in the play Frankenstein's Monster's Monster, Frankenstein
- Alex Ozerov as Joey Vallejo, a deceased movie star who portrayed Sal in the play
- Kate Berlant as Monica Fulton, an actress who portrayed Miss Macbeth in the play
- Mary Woronov as Nancy Erlich, the producer of the play
- Alfred Molina as Aubrey Fields, a legendary actor and television host who portrayed the sea captain in the play
- Heather Lawless as the doctor in the play
- Michael Lerner as Bobby Fox, Harbour Jr.'s former agent
- Marion Van Cuyck, the Frankenstein's niece in the play
- Bridey Elliott as a reporter who interviews Harbour Jr.
- O-Lan Jones as Frankenstein's mother in the play
- Lidia Porto as a detective hired by Harbour III to investigate his father
- Graham Wagner as Graham, a dramaturge hired by Harbour III as a personal assistant
- Randolph Thompson as a forensic accountant hired by Harbour III to investigate his father

== Reception ==
The review aggregator website Rotten Tomatoes reported an 88% approval rating with an average score of 6.5/10, based on 17 reviews. The website's critical consensus reads, "While Frankenstein's Monster's Monster, Frankenstein's offbeat sense of humor might be too strange for some, those looking for a kooky new comedy will find much to like in its spooky spoofs." Metacritic, which uses a weighted average, assigned a score of 66 out of 100 based on four critics, indicating "generally favorable reviews".
