= Marion Van Cuyck =

American actress

- Occupation: Actress
- Years active: 2012–present

Marion Van Cuyck is an American actress known for portraying Terra Newback on Hulu's PEN15 and on Netflix's "Frankenstein's Monster's Monster, Frankenstein".

== Film ==
Year	Title	Role	Notes
2023	Big Boys	Ericka	
2019	Frankenstein's Monster's Monster, Frankenstein	Niece	

== Television ==
Year	Title	Role	Notes
2017	Baskets	Ellie	Episode: "Ronald Reagan Library"
2017	Good Game	Katie	Episode "Everyone Calls Everyone Else a Nazi"
2019–2021	PEN15	Terra Newback	7 episodes
2021	Drama Club	Marion	2 episodes
