= Debbie Liebling =

American film producer

- Liebling (center) with Jay Roach and Fox chairman Jim Gianopulos
- Born: Deborah Liebling
- Education: Boston University
- Occupations: Entertainment executive, film producer

Deborah Liebling is an American entertainment executive and film producer.

== Early life ==
Liebling graduated from Boston University in 1981.

== Career ==
She was formally President of Production of Universal Pictures. Previously, she was a Senior Production Executive at 20th Century Fox.

Before her tenure at 20th Century Fox, she was Senior Vice President of original programming and development at Comedy Central where she was responsible for the development of South Park.

Liebling made the switch from television to film on the strength of studio deals she helped with filmmakers like Jay Roach, Peter and Bobby Farrelly, Harold Ramis, Mike Judge, Steve Oedekerk, John Davis and Gil Netter.

At Fox, she was the studio executive that oversaw the production of films including Dodgeball: A True Underdog Story and Borat.

In January 2007, Liebling was promoted President of Production for Fox Atomic. Fox Atomic shut down in early 2009.

== Accolades ==
She was nominated for three Emmy Awards for her work as Executive Producer on South Park.

== Filmography ==
- South Park – Producer
- Turn Ben Stein On – Executive Producer
- South Park: Bigger, Longer & Uncut – Co-Producer
- Dodgeball: A True Underdog Story – Executive Producer
- Idiocracy – Executive Producer
- Rebound Guy – Executive Producer
- Big Time in Hollywood, FL - Executive Producer
- Plus One - Producer
- Unplugging - Producer
- 65 - Producer
