= Anna Konkle =

American actress (born 1987)

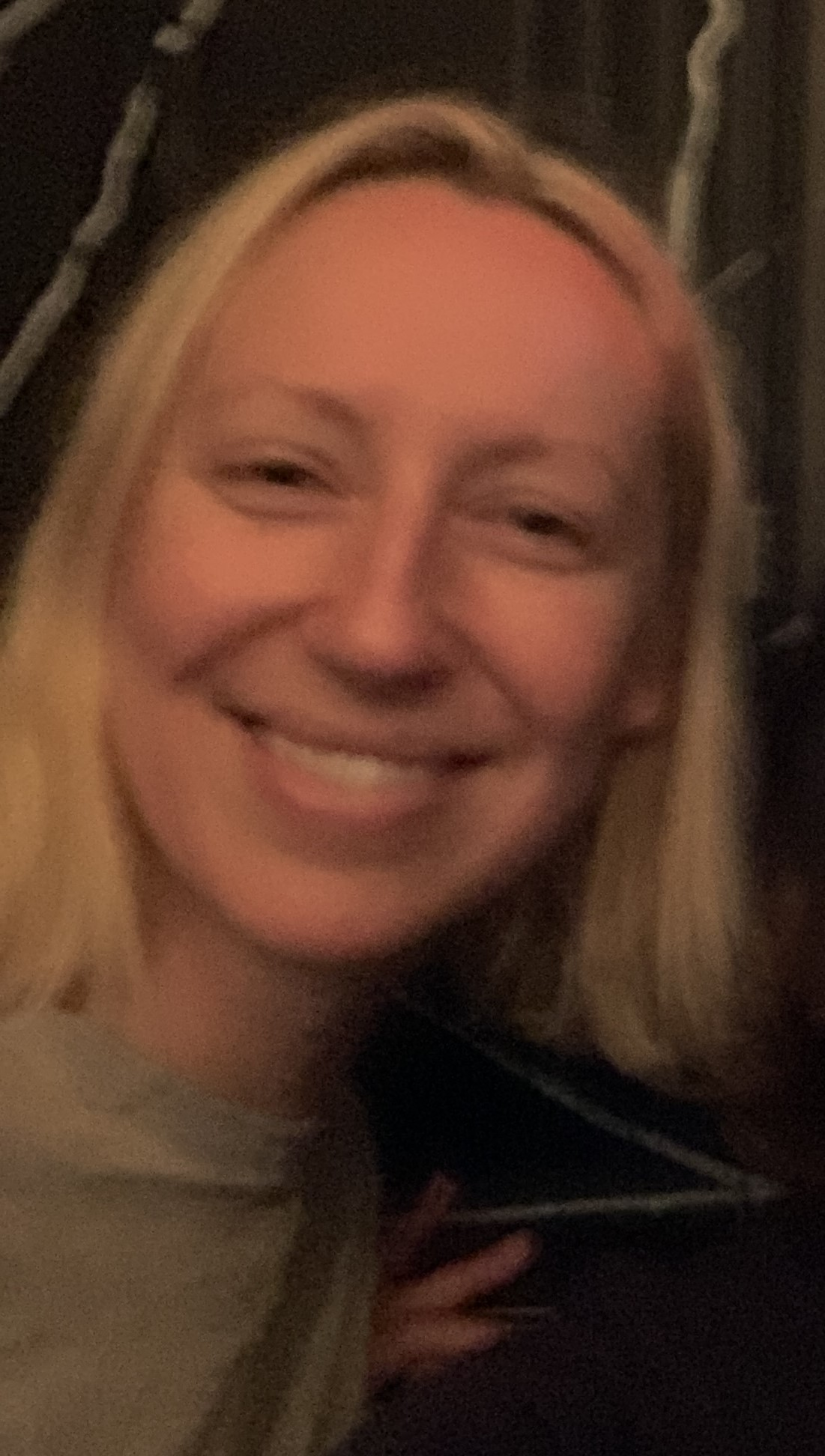
- Konkle in 2023
- Born: April 7, 1987 (age 39); Randolph, Vermont, U.S.
- Education: New York University (BFA)
- Occupations: Actress, screenwriter, director
- Years active: 2013–present
- Partner: Alex Anfanger
- Children: 1

Anna Konkle (born April 7, 1987) is an American actress, writer and director. She is known for co-creating and starring as Anna Kone on Hulu's original TV comedy series PEN15, alongside Maya Erskine. Her work on the series earned her two Primetime Emmy Awards nominations for Outstanding Writing for a Comedy Series in 2019 and Outstanding Comedy Series in 2021.

== Early life ==
Konkle was born in Randolph, Vermont, on April 7, 1987. In 1994, her family moved to Scituate, Massachusetts, where she attended public schools. Her parents divorced in her early teens, a theme she would explore deeply on PEN15.

Konkle attended New York University's Tisch School of the Arts. She initially studied musical theater but shifted to the school's Experimental Theater Wing after finding out she had vocal nodules. During her junior year at NYU, she attended an international experimental theater program in Amsterdam. There she met fellow student Maya Erskine, who would become her best friend and PEN15 co-creator.

== Career ==
Konkle started her career working on student films while at the New York University and in experimental theater. During the first decade of her career, she appeared in small roles in TV shows such as New Girl, Shameless and Ramy. From 2015 to 2017, she appeared as Tara "TMI" Milly Izikoff on the main cast of Rosewood.

In 2019, Konkle co-created with Maya Erskine and Sam Zvibleman Hulu's original TV comedy series PEN15. Konkle and Erskine star as 13-year-old semi-fictional versions of themselves as adults. The show received critical acclaim and for her work, she earned two Primetime Emmy Awards nominations for Outstanding Writing for a Comedy Series in 2019 and Outstanding Comedy Series in 2021.

In 2026, Konkle released her memoir The Sane One.

== Personal life ==
In early 2021, Konkle confirmed she had had her first daughter, Essie Wunderle Anfanger, with actor Alex Anfanger.

== Filmography ==
Anna Konkle filmography
Year	Title	Role	Notes
2013	Betas	Enid	2 episodes
2014	New Girl	Judy	Episode: "Landline"
2015	Man Seeking Woman	Kayla	Episode: "Gavel"
2015–2016	Maron	Shay	4 episodes
2015–2017	Rosewood	Tara "TMI" Milly Izikoff	44 episodes
2017	Home: Adventures with Tip & Oh	Slushious (voice)	2 episodes
2017	Shameless	Tenant	Episode: "Where's My Meth?"
2019	Ramy	Chloe	Episode: "Between the Toes"
2019–2021	PEN15	Anna Kone	24-25 episodes; also creator, writer, and executive producer
2019	Plus One	Jenna	
2019	Baskets	Anita	3 episodes
2020	Robot Chicken	(voice)	Episode: "Gracie Purgatory in: That's How You Get Hemorrhoids"
2020	Big Mouth	Cafeteria Girl Izzy (voice)	Episode: "Cafeteria Girls."
2021	Together Together	Shayleen	Feature film
2022	The Drop	Lex	Feature film
2023	Judy Blume Forever	Herself	Documentary
2023	The Afterparty	Hannah Minnows	Main role (season 2); 9 episodes
2025	Side Quest	Maude	Episode: "Song and Dance"
2025	Murderbot	Leebeebee	
2025	Untitled Home Invasion Romance	Heather	Feature Film
2026	Hacks	Beth	Episode: "Who's Making Dinner?"
2026	The Sun Never Sets		Post-production
TBA	Close Personal Friends †	TBA	Post-production
