= Crime in Estonia =

- Homicide: 1.8 (2024)
- Assault: 2.7 (2023)
- Theft: 738.6 (2024)
- Fraud: 272.4 (2024)
- Corruption: 4.6 (2024)
- Bribery: 1.8 (2024)
- Money laundering: 1.4 (2024)
- Rape: 14.0 (2023)
- Sexual violence: 31.2 (2023)
- reported per 100,000 inhabitants

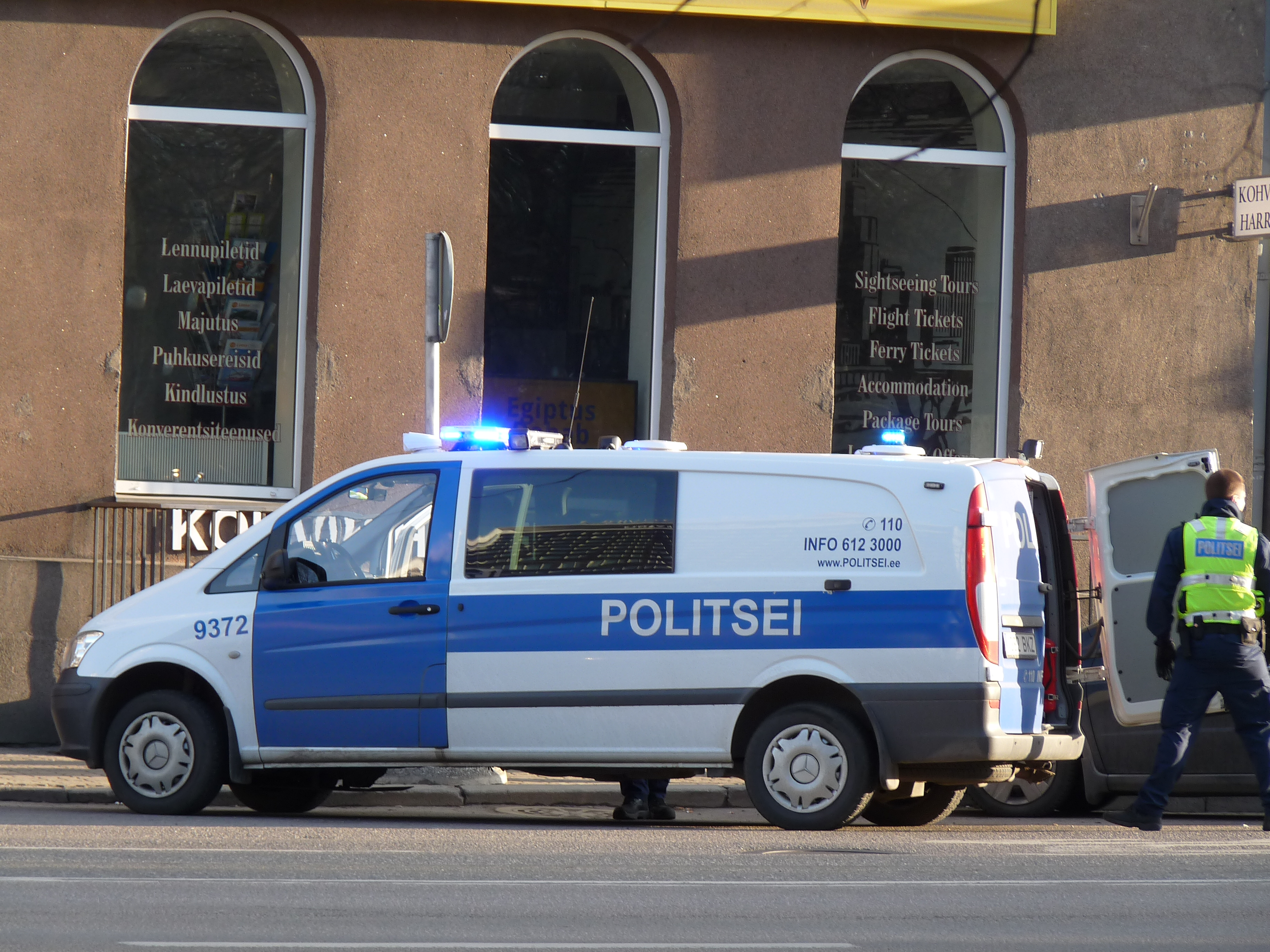
Estonian police in the capital, Tallinn

Estonia is a relatively safe country, and the risk of being a victim of crime in Estonia is small by international standards. As in other post-Soviet states, crime increased in the 1990s, often referred to as the wild nineties, but then it has gradually decreased in the 21st century.

== Crime by type ==
=== Murder ===
In 2020, Estonia had a murder rate of 2.8 per 100,000 population. This was the third highest rate among the European Union countries, behind Latvia (4.9) and Lithuania (3.5); nevertheless, it was lower than the global average of 6.1 victims per 100,000 people (in 2017). In 2022, there were a total of 18 murders, which was the lowest number since regaining independence.

The murder rate was considerably higher in the 1990s and the 2000s. An average of 9.4 people per 100,000 per year were killed in Estonia between 1999 and 2001.

=== Organised crime ===
Organized crime is characterized by a loose alliance of mobster groups, principally of Russian origins, with a wide range of different rackets: prostitution, motor vehicle theft, drug trafficking, and previously also "providing" workers to building contracts in Finland, where the criminal organizations were confiscating a share of workers' wages.

==== Common Fund ====
The Common Fund (Estonian: ühiskassa) is a traditional umbrella organisation of criminal groups, a trade union of sorts that settles conflicts and establishes the boundaries of the spheres of interest of the various groups. In 2003, the Common Fund had been dominated for about 15 years by Nikolai Tarankov of Russian heritage and KGB training. However, Tarankov was killed by his godson in 2016. The Common Fund pays for lawyers of caught members, purchases and delivers packages to imprisoned members and covers other expenses. Such "insurance" increases the loyalty of the members.

In 2005, the Estonian Central Criminal Police noticed a decline in revenues of the Common Fund, leading to the capture of several high-ranking members. The decline has been attributed to changes in Estonian society, particularly those experienced in the lead-up to accession to European Union.

The police have been successful in disrupting the operations of the Obshchak by arresting their high-ranking members since at least the 2010s. One of the kingpins, Assar Paulus, was convicted in 2016 for founding a criminal organization and funding drug trafficking. The mafia got its income through illegal debt collection using methods like extortion, tax fraud, drug trafficking and violent crimes. In general, violent crime and protection rackets have become a thing of the past in the organization: it is no longer necessary for ordinary businesspeople to pay protection money to the mafia. Instead, the mafia is more involved in the drug trade and white-collar crime such as tax fraud. Also, many former mafia "businesspeople" have moved to legitimate businesses.

=== Fraud ===
Aarni Neuvonen is the largest ever perpetrator of employment fraud in Estonia. He is known for having collected money with the promise of overseas jobs from thousands of people and disappearing after having caused over (estimated) 10 million EEK of damages in 1993. Avo Viiol was convicted of embezzlement in 2003. The neologism viioldama, has become a slang verb meaning "to embezzle".

=== Drugs ===
The illegal drug trade's turnover in Estonia, according to 2008 estimates, might be several billion EEK. According to the opinion of the senior superintendent of Narcotic Crimes Department at the North Police Prefecture, only 1% of the whole amount of drugs on the market is confiscated in Estonia. In 2011, the EUROPOL Trafficking Unit designated the Baltic states and Kaliningrad as a transit hub for drug trafficking in and out of Russia.

=== Corruption ===
In 2008, Transparency International measured the Corruption Perception Index for Estonia to be at 6.6 (CI 6.2–6.9), ranking it 27th in a list of 180 countries. In comparison, neighbouring Sweden was ranked 1st–3rd with a CPI at 9.3 (CI 9.2–9.4), Finland 5th–6th with a CPI at 9.0 (CI 8.4–9.4), Russia 147th–150th with a CPI at 2.1 (CI 1.9–2.5), and Latvia 52nd with a CPI at 5.0 (CI 4.8–5.2). A higher index means perception of more transparency and less corruption. As of 2014, the Corruption Perception Index for Estonia is 6.9, placing it at the 26th position (in the context of the EU, above France and below Austria). In 2022, Estonia ranked 14th.

A total of 326 corruption-related offenses were identified and registered in 2008, considerably below the number registered in 2006, when 511 instances of corruption were found, but 17% higher than in 2007, and slightly higher than in 2003. These accounted for just 0.6% of all criminal offenses.

Foreign investors do not consider corruption as a main problem of doing business in Estonia. In general, the public sector is transparent and has good compliance with anti-corruption initiatives and demonstrates adherence to ethical principles on the cultural level.

In February 2012, the government passed an anti-corruption act in order to further improve transparency in the public sector, such as asset disclosure by government officials. Public trust in the electoral system is high. However, the government still faces challenges in combating corruption. Local-level government corruption still remains a problem, and public awareness of corruption-prevention needs to be raised.

=== Human trafficking ===
According to Interpol in 2002, since the fall of the Soviet Union, the largest group of prostitutes working in Finland has consisted of trafficked women from Estonia and Russia.

In 2012, the "Trafficking in Persons Report" issued by the US Trafficking state department repeats the claims of previous years that Estonia is "source, transit, and destination" for adult human trafficking, and that Estonia fails to comply with its minimum standards for eliminating trafficking. It now adds that the government "is making significant efforts to do so". Trafficking is now treated as a serious matter by the Estonian government, which enacted a law in 2012 criminalizing trafficking in persons with penalties of up to 15 years imprisonment. The Estonian government identified 56 victims in 2011; 39 women, 17 men, and no children; 37 were sex trafficking victims, and 19 were labor trafficking victims.

The report also states that the Estonian government funds ($US42k) an active anti-trafficking hotline, and that it has increased funding ($US158k) for anti-trafficking victim care and that it maintains a "strong and supportive" relationship with organisations active in anti-trafficking. To this end, the government has published a victim identification guide in Estonian and Russian, for use by law enforcement officials. The government has distributed anti-trafficking material at tourism and job fairs. Consular officials have visited schools to discuss the dangers of trafficking. The government has also coordinated efforts in trafficking-reduction/elimination with other countries and has taken various other anti-trafficking measures.

== Crime dynamics ==
Estonia is one of the safest and stablest countries in Europe, but between the 1990s and the 2000s, organized crime prevailed and it was characterized by a loose alliance of mobster groups, principally of Russian origins, with a wide range of different rackets: prostitution, motor vehicle theft, drug trafficking, and previously also "providing" workers to building contracts in Finland, where the criminal organizations were confiscating a share of workers' wages. Although small in size, the Estonian mafia was hierarchical and well-organized, which has enabled its survival to this day, albeit to a much more modest form. Also, the murder rate was considerably higher than ever during the same period in Estonia; for example, an average of 9.4 people per 100,000 per year were killed in Estonia between 1999 and 2001. According to statistics published in Britain in 2008 relating to the period 1991–2001, the number of crimes increased by 84% from 1991 to 2001. The number of discovered drug-related crimes increased by 21 between 1997 and 2001. Overall, crime has fallen precipitously between 1995 and 2010, by close to 70%.

== Crime by Estonian residents overseas ==
=== Jewellery robberies ===
In December 2006, it was estimated that residents of Estonia were responsible for 140 robberies of jewellery and watch stores in Finland, the Netherlands, Portugal, Italy, Spain, France, Germany, the United Kingdom, Denmark, and Sweden during the three years prior. The value of the lost property is estimated to be 25 million euros. In 2012, Le gang des Estoniens was tried in France for robbing several jewellers' shops in Paris.

== Sources ==
- Organised crime situation report 2001 at www.coe.int/ (Council of Europe)
