= Obshchak =

Organized crime group in Estonia

- Years active: 1991–present
- Territory: Estonia, Finland
- Ethnicity: Russians; Belarusians; Estonians
- Leader: Nikolai Tarankov (2003–2016)
- Activities: Contract killing; robbery; drug trafficking; prostitution; smuggling; extortion; white-collar crime
- Allies: Russian Bratva

The Obshchak (Russian: Общак), obštšak (Estonian spelling), or ühiskassa (Estonian) or "common treasury" is a traditional umbrella organisation of criminal groups in Estonia, a trade union of sorts that settles conflicts and establishes boundaries of the spheres of interest of various groups such as the Russian mafia and Estonian organized crime. Between 2003 and 2016, the Common Fund was dominated by Nikolai Tarankov (1953–2016) of Russian heritage and KGB training. Tarankov was found murdered in Haapsalu, apparently in a revenge murder related to his past actions. The Common Fund pays for lawyers of caught members, purchases and delivers packages to imprisoned members, and covers other expenses. The organization has about ten member groups. The members have also operated significantly in Finland, where in 2009, high-level drug dealing was controlled by Estonians.

In 2005, the Estonian Central Criminal Police noticed a decline in revenues of the Common Fund, leading to the capture of several high-ranking members.

Estonian police have been successful in disrupting the operations of the Obshchak by arresting their high-ranking members since at least the 2010s. One of the kingpins, Assar Paulus, was convicted in 2016 for founding a criminal organization and funding drug trafficking. The mafia got its income through illegal debt collection using methods like extortion, tax fraud, drug trafficking, and violent crimes. In general, violent crime and protection rackets have become a thing of the past in the organization: it is no longer necessary for ordinary businesspeople to pay protection money to the mafia. Instead, the mafia is more involved in drug trade and white-collar crime such as tax fraud. Also, many former mafia "businesspeople" have moved to legitimate businesses.

== In media ==
The Obschak is a plot element in the 2021 American action film Nobody.

== See also ==
- Organized crime in Estonia
