= No Exit (Miami Vice) =

- Miami Vice episode
- Episode no.: Season 1 Episode 8
- Directed by: David Soul
- Story by: Charles R. Leinenweber
- Teleplay by: Charles R. Leinenweber; Maurice Hurley
- Production code: 59508
- Original air date: November 9, 1984
- Running time: 46 minutes

Guest appearances
- Bruce Willis as Tony Amato; Katherine Borowitz as Rita Amato

Episode chronology
← Previous "One Eyed Jack"	Next → "The Great McCarthy"

"'No Exit" is the seventh episode of the first season of the American police procedural television series Miami Vice. It premiered on the National Broadcasting Company (NBC) on November 9, 1984. The episode was written by Charles R. Leinenweber and Maurice Hurley, and directed by David Soul. "No Exit" featured guest appearances by Bruce Willis, Katherine Borowitz and Vinnie Curto.

Miami Vice focuses on the lives of two undercover Metro-Dade police officers, James "Sonny" Crockett (Don Johnson) and Ricardo Tubbs (Philip Michael Thomas). In this episode, the detectives investigate an arms dealer selling military hardware. The dealer's abuse of his spouse complicates the surveillance.

Written under the working title "Three-Eyed Turtle", the episode has been seen as exploring existentialist themes, including Jean-Paul Sartre's theory that all relationships are based on a struggle for dominance. The episode features a contemporary pop soundtrack, using Phil Collins' "I Don't Care Anymore" and "Stay with Me" by Teddy Pendergrass.

== Plot ==
Metro-Dade detectives James "Sonny" Crockett (Don Johnson) and Ricardo Tubbs (Philip Michael Thomas), and lieutenant Martin Castillo (Edward James Olmos) are undercover to arrest a pair of arms dealers. After a brief shoot-out, the dealers are taken into custody, and during the course of their confessions, reveal their supplier to be a man named Tony Amato.

Amato (Bruce Willis) is an international arms dealer who the Federal Bureau of Investigation have been tracking, as they believe Amato is planning the sale of FIM-92 Stinger missiles stolen from a military arms depot. The FBI agrees to allow Metro-Dade to conduct the surveillance as its equipment was in place first. Crockett and Tubbs watch Amato's abusive relationship with his wife Rita (Katherine Borowitz). When Rita attempts to hire a hitman to kill Amato, Crockett intercepts the call and meets with her, arranging her help in their case in return for her safety. She explains that she has tried to leave Amato before, but he hired thugs to rape her divorce lawyer's wife to scare her into place.

Amato's prospective buyer is intercepted and arrested. The FBI had initially planned to send one of their agents undercover in his place, but Tubbs volunteers for the role, fearing the agent is too inexperienced. Tubbs meets with Amato and his henchmen, who demonstrate one of the Stingers and explain how to take out a civilian airplane with an unarmed missile. Tubbs agrees to purchase all of Amato's inventory and arranges another meet to make the buy. That night, Crockett, surveilling Amato's house, sees him beat Rita again, and is unable to intervene.

When Amato breaks his telephone in a rage, he finds one of the surveillance devices. Tubbs quickly calls him, claiming to have been bugged as well, and the two arrange to move the buy to that evening. Amato is noticeably on-edge during the meet, and is desperate to unload the missiles. The buy is set to take place at the docks, and the remainder of the Metro-Dade vice squad arrive with federal agents to complete the bust, taking Amato into custody safely.

However, when Amato is due to be arraigned the next morning, a group of federal agents arrive with paperwork offering him immunity from prosecution in exchange for working for them to supply South American anti-Communist groups. Rita arrives to see Amato going free, draws a gun from her handbag, and shoots him.

== Production ==
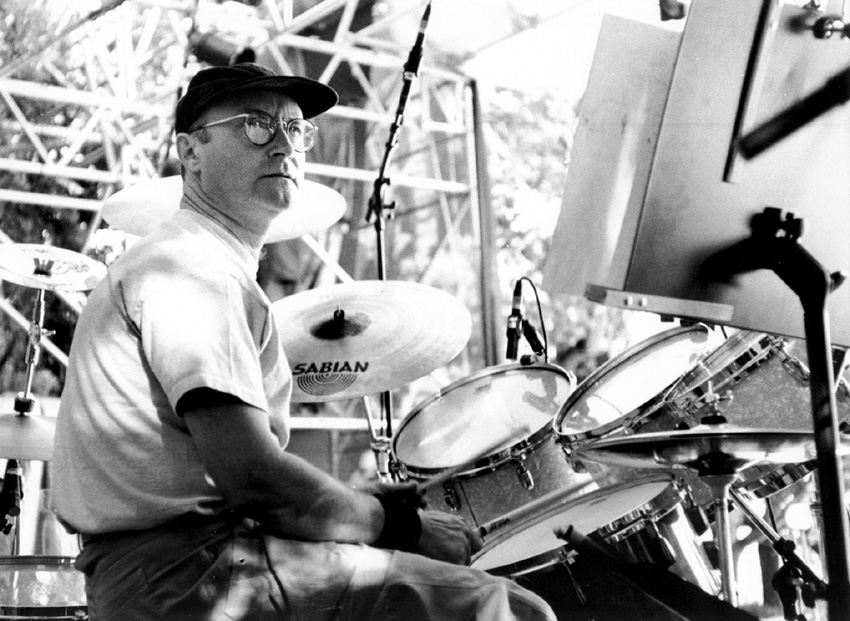
"I Don't Care Anymore" by Phil Collins (pictured 1996) featured in "No Exit".

"No Exit" was originally given the working title "Three-Eyed Turtle", which was changed when an executive at the National Broadcasting Company (NBC)'s Standards and Practices office realized this was slang for a sexual act. The amended title, "No Exit", has been seen by critics Steven Sanders and Aeon Skoble as a reference to Jean-Paul Sartre's 1944 play No Exit, as the episode features "an early series engagement with existentialism". The pair have argued that the fractured relationship between Tony and Rita Amato echoes the philosopher's assertion that all human relationships are defined by a struggle for control and supremacy.

"No Exit" was directed by David Soul, whose Starsky and Hutch co-star Paul Michael Glaser had also directed for the series. Writer Maurice Hurley would receive writing credits on a number of other Miami Vice episodes, including "The Dutch Oven", "Whatever Works", and "Golden Triangle". The location used for Amato's home was the "Pink House", a nickname for the Spear House in Miami Shores, Florida; a 1978 building designed by architecture firm Arquitectonica. The location was chosen for use in the episode by executive producer Michael Mann. Guest star Bruce Willis was one of a number of New York stage actors cast in the series, having only appeared in an Off-Broadway performance of Fool for Love before being cast as Tony Amato. Boxer Vinnie Curto was cast as a bodyguard to Willis' character.

As was customary for episodes of Miami Vice, "No Exit" makes use of contemporary pop music in its soundtrack, featuring the songs "Stay With Me" by Teddy Pendergrass and "I Don't Care Anymore" by Phil Collins. The latter song featured in a scene of Crockett driving at night, echoing the use of Collins' "In the Air Tonight" in a similar scene in the pilot, "Brother's Keeper". The alienation discussed in "I Don't Care Anymore" has been described as mirroring the violent rift in Amato's marriage, and also the detachment with which Crockett must approach this aspect of the case.

== Broadcast and reception ==
This is the Michael Mann touch in spades: a sparely furnished high-end abode, some slick professionals, and a soundtrack that suffuses everything with poetic melancholy.

— The A.V. Club's Noel Murrary on Mann's influence on the episode

"No Exit" was first broadcast on NBC on November 9, 1984. NBC repeated the episode twice in 1985, before airing it once more in 1986.

Todd Douglass Jr. described "No Exit" as being "definitely one of the highlights" of Miami Vice's first season. Douglass felt that the episode's tight focus left it "one of the more entertaining" installments of the series. "No Exit" has been seen as a "turning point" for Miami Vice, finalizing what would become the overall tone of the series. This has been credited to the addition of Edward James Olmos to the cast, and Mann becoming the sole executive producer after the departure of Anthony Yerkovich. The episode has also been noted as an example of the series' criticism of the presidency of Ronald Reagan, linking the villain Amato with United States intervention in South America. This critique of the federal government and its handling of foreign intervention would prove to be a recurring element of the series, featuring in the second season episode "Prodigal Son" and the fourth season episode "Baseballs of Death".

Willis' portrayal of Amato has been described by critic Mark T. Conard as an example of a recurring character archetype in the series, that of a troubled male with a checkered past. Other examples given by Conard are Bruce McGill's guest role in "Out Where the Buses Don't Run" and G. Gordon Liddy's appearance in "Stone's War". Conard also identifies the three male protagonists—Crockett, Tubbs and Castillo—among this archetype.

== Footnotes ==
=== References ===
- Conard, Mark T. (2007). The Philosophy of Neo-Noir. University Press of Kentucky. ISBN 978-0-8131-2422-3.
- Sanders, Steven (2010). Miami Vice: TV Milestones. Wayne State University Press. ISBN 978-0-8143-3419-5.
- Sanders, Steven; Skoble, Aeon J (2008). The Philosophy of TV Noir. University Press of Kentucky. ISBN 978-0813124490.
- Schwarzer, Mitchell (2004). ZoomScape: Architecture in Motion and Media. Princeton Architectural Press. ISBN 1568984413.
- Trutnau, John-Paul (2005). A One-man Show?: The Construction and Deconstruction of a Patriarchal Image in the Reagan Era: Reading the Audio-visual Poetics of Miami Vice. Trafford Publishing. ISBN 1412050960.
