= List of Miami Vice episodes =

Three color variation of the series' logo

The following is an episode list for the 1980s American undercover cop television series Miami Vice. In the United States, the show was broadcast on NBC. The first episode of the series premiered on September 16, 1984, with the series concluding on June 28, 1989, after five seasons.

Due to an inability to secure music rights to two Peter Gabriel songs featured in the S1E22 episode "Evan", that episode was included in the DVD release but is not included in the Blu-ray collection or on any streaming service. It aired on NBC on Friday May 3, 1985 and finally was aired during its syndication run on USA Network thus concluding the series on January 25, 1990. There are a total of 114 episodes, spanning five years (1984–1989) of the show's run. The individual seasons are available on DVD in Regions 1, 2 and 4 and Blu-ray in Regions A and B.

== Series overview ==
| Season | Episodes | Originally released | |
| Season | Episodes | First released | Last released |
|---|---|---|---|
| 1 | 23 | September 16, 1984 | May 10, 1985 |
| 2 | 23 | September 27, 1985 | May 9, 1986 |
| 3 | 24 | September 26, 1986 | May 8, 1987 |
| 4 | 22 | September 25, 1987 | May 6, 1988 |
| 5 | 22 | November 4, 1988 | January 25, 1990 |

== Episodes ==
=== Season 1 (1984–85) ===
Season one of Miami Vice premiered on September 16, 1984, with the two-hour pilot premiere on NBC and concluded on May 10, 1985, after 22 episodes. Regular cast members included Don Johnson, Philip Michael Thomas, Saundra Santiago, Gregory Sierra, Michael Talbott, John Diehl, Olivia Brown, and Edward James Olmos.

The first season was filmed on location in Miami, Florida. The show's crew took up semi-permanent residence in the Alexander Hotel. They later worked out of Greenwich Studios.

The film crew on the show was 95% local to the Miami area. Various filming locations on the show included: Downtown Miami, Old Miamarina (Bayside Market Place), Opa Locka Airport, Biscayne Boulevard, Key Biscayne, Florida, Venetian Causeway, Coconut Grove, South Beach, North Miami Beach, St. Croix, McArthur Causeway, Ocean Drive, and Tamiami Trail.

Episodes were produced at an average cost of $1.3 million, much higher than the typical cop-show episode of $1 million. The show went to unusual lengths to get the right settings and props for each episode.

Music was an integral part of the show. Unlike other television shows at the time, Miami Vice would buy the rights to original versions rather than covers. The show would spend up to $10,000 per episode for original recordings by artists like Todd Rundgren, U2, and Frankie Goes to Hollywood. Jan Hammer, the show's musical composer, would create the rest of the show's musical score. For most of the early work on the show, he prominently used both the Memorymoog and the Fairlight CMI IIx, as well as later including the Yamaha DX-7 and the Roland Jupiter-8. Jan would work out of his state-of-the-art studio in his home in Brewster, New York composing the score for each episode.

| No. overall | No. in season | Title | Directed by | Written by | Film order | Original release date | Prod. code | Rating/share (households) |
|---|---|---|---|---|---|---|---|---|
| 1 | 1 | "Brother's Keeper" | Thomas Carter | Anthony Yerkovich | 101 | September 16, 1984 | 83504 | 22.8/37 |
| 2 | 2 | "Brother's Keeper" | Thomas Carter | Anthony Yerkovich | 101 | September 16, 1984 | 83504 | 22.8/37 |
(Miami) Vice Squad detective James "Sonny" Crockett has just lost his partner, Eddie Rivera (Jimmy Smits), in a car bombing. Crockett was investigating Esteban Calderone (Miguel Pinero), a Colombian cocaine dealer, when he meets a New York City narcotics detective, Rafael Tubbs. Since they are having difficulties approaching Calderone, Crockett and Tubbs are forced to work together. Crockett later confronts "Rafael" and discovers that he is actually Ricardo, Rafael's younger brother and a New York detective, who is seeking revenge on Calderone for killing his brother. They agree to work together and Calderone is collared, but he pays $2 million bail and escapes. In the end, Crockett persuades Tubbs to enter a career in "Southern law enforcement". Note: Originally aired as a two-hour, pilot TV movie, and is shown as two episodes in syndication.
| 3 | 3 | "Heart of Darkness" | John Llewellyn Moxey | A.J. Edison | 102 | September 28, 1984 | 59501 | 13.8/24 |
Crockett and Tubbs go under cover to infiltrate an illegal pornography ring, as well as rein in an undercover FBI agent (Ed O'Neill) who may have gone over to the other side.
| 4 | 4 | "Cool Runnin'" | Lee H. Katzin | Joel Surnow | 103 | October 5, 1984 | 59502 | 14.0/24 |
The Vice Squad is forced to rely on a petty criminal (Charlie Barnett) to help the force bust a gang of violent Jamaican thugs that is responsible for a series of deadly drug ripoffs around the city.
| 5 | 5 | "Calderone's Return: The Hit List" (Part 1) | Richard Colla | Joel Surnow | 104 | October 19, 1984 | 59504 | 13.5/23 |
Calderone, Crockett and Tubbs' old nemesis, hires a notorious Argentinian assassin to take out his largest competitors in Miami, and the Vice Squad soon learns that Crockett's name is last on a list of eight victims.
| 6 | 6 | "Calderone's Return: Calderone's Demise" (Part 2) | Paul Michael Glaser | Joel Surnow & Alfonse Ruggiero Jr. | 106 | October 26, 1984 | 59507 | 12.1/21 |
Although Crockett survived the attempt on his life, Lt. Rodriguez (Gregory Sierra) was not so lucky. Now Crockett and Tubbs must travel to Bimini to get Calderone and avenge the lieutenant's murder. Along the way, however, Tubbs unknowingly falls for Calderone's daughter (Phanie Napoli), who is unaware of her father's nefarious dealings.
| 7 | 7 | "One Eyed Jack" | Lee H. Katzin | Alfonse Ruggiero Jr. | 105 | November 2, 1984 | 59503 | 12.1/21 |
As the Vice Squad is taken over by a new lieutenant, Martin Castillo (Edward James Olmos), Crockett is framed for taking bribes as he tries to help an old flame (Janet Constable) get out of a debt to the infamous loan shark Al Lombard (Dennis Farina).
| 8 | 8 | "No Exit" | David Soul | Story by : Charles R. Leinenweber; Teleplay by : Maurice Hurley | 107 | November 9, 1984 | 59508 | 11.5/20 |
The Vice Squad joins forces with the FBI in an effort to prevent an arms dealer (Bruce Willis) from selling off a cache of stolen FIM-92 Stinger missiles.
| 9 | 9 | "The Great McCarthy" | Georg Stanford Brown | Philip Reed & Joel Surnow | 109 | November 16, 1984 | 59509 | 12.2/22 |
Crockett puts his beloved cigarette speedboat on the line during the Vice Squad's attempt to collar a drug smuggler (William Gray Espy) who moves his product using his favorite hobby—speedboat racing—as a cover.
| 10 | 10 | "Glades" | Stan Lathan | Rex Weiner & Allan Weisberger | 108 | November 30, 1984 | 59506 | 13.9/24 |
Crockett and Tubbs must journey into the Everglades to recover a key witness (Keith Szarabajka) who fled from their protection two days before he is scheduled to testify against a Colombian drug importer.
| 11 | 11 | "Give a Little, Take a Little" | Bobby Roth | Chuck Adamson | 110 | December 7, 1984 | 59505 | 12.6/21 |
Crockett's refusal to identify an informant (Lenny Von Dohlen) in court gets him locked up on contempt charges. Meanwhile, Detectives Trudy and Gina encounter difficulties while attempting to infiltrate a prostitution ring.
| 12 | 12 | "Little Prince" | Alan J. Levi | Story by : Joel Surnow & Wendy Cozen; Teleplay by : A.J. Edison | 112 | December 14, 1984 | 59515 | 12.9/20 |
After the Vice Squad arrests the heroin-addicted son (Mitchell Lichtenstein) of a wealthy market trader during a raid, Crockett and Tubbs recruit him to bring down his own father (Paul Roebling), who is supplementing the family's fortune with cocaine distribution.
| 13 | 13 | "Milk Run" | John Nicolella | Allison Hock | 113 | January 4, 1985 | 59512 | 16.2/25 |
Two naive college students (Evan Handler, Al Shannon) from New York City run afoul of the Vice Squad during their attempt to run a small shipment of cocaine from Colombia to Miami.
| 14 | 14 | "Golden Triangle" (Part 1) | Georg Stanford Brown | Story by : Joseph Gunn; Teleplay by : Joseph Gunn & Maurice Hurley | 111 | January 11, 1985 | 59511 | 15.8/25 |
While working under cover to bust dirty cops shaking down prostitutes at a high-end hotel, Crockett and Tubbs stumble upon a plan by two thieves to rob the hotel's safe deposit boxes. When the thieves are brutally murdered and mutilated, Lt. Castillo recognizes a connection to a far larger criminal organization, one that he has encountered in the past, while working as a DEA agent in Thailand.
| 15 | 15 | "Golden Triangle" (Part 2) | David Anspaugh | Maurice Hurley & Michael Mann | 114 | January 18, 1985 | 59516 | 15.1/26 |
The Vice Squad puts their other cases on hold to help Castillo bring down Lao Li (Keye Luke), a Chinese drug lord who killed Castillo's DEA colleagues five years ago, who is now living in Miami with his extended family and holding Castillo's former wife (Joan Chen) hostage to deter Castillo from acting against him.
| 16 | 16 | "Smuggler's Blues" | Paul Michael Glaser | Miguel Piñero | 115 | February 1, 1985 | 59514 | 14.2/22 |
Crockett and Tubbs are recruited by the DEA to pose as drug smugglers and travel to Cartagena in an effort to flush out someone in law enforcement who has been extorting drug dealers by kidnapping their families. Glenn Frey plays a pilot who flies Crockett and Tubbs to South America to conduct a drug deal.
| 17 | 17 | "Rites of Passage" | David Anspaugh | Daniel Pyne | 116 | February 8, 1985 | 59519 | 16.4/27 |
Tubbs' old flame, NYPD Detective Valerie Gordon (Pam Grier), comes to Miami in search of her missing sister (Tery Ferman), who has become involved with a prostitution ring that the Vice Squad is trying to bring down.
| 18 | 18 | "The Maze" | Tim Zinnemann | Michael Eric Stein | 117 | February 22, 1985 | 59523 | 15.8/27 |
Tubbs is taken hostage by gang members in a run-down hotel, along with all of the other squatters, thanks to the would-be heroics of a cop out to avenge his partner's murder.
| 19 | 19 | "Made for Each Other" | Rob Cohen | Story by : Allan Weisbecker & Joel Surnow & Teleplay by : Allan Weisbecker & Dennis Cooper | 118 | March 8, 1985 | 59527 | 13.5/23 |
After his house is destroyed in an accidental fire, Zito is forced to move in with Switek and his new girlfriend (Ellen Greene), who also happens to be Zito's ex. The resulting friction threatens to derail the pair's investigation of a ring of thieves selling stolen goods.
| 20 | 20 | "The Home Invaders" | Abel Ferrara | Chuck Adamson | 119 | March 15, 1985 | 59525 | 14.7/25 |
The Vice Squad is brought in to help the Robbery division stop a series of violent home invasions in wealthy neighborhoods. During the investigation, Crockett learns that one of his old mentors (Jack Kehoe) may be losing his touch.
| 21 | 21 | "Nobody Lives Forever" | Jim Johnston | Edward DiLorenzo | 120 | March 29, 1985 | 59520 | 17.4/29 |
As the Vice Squad races to track down a trio of hoods on a violent, drug-fueled joyride through the city, Crockett's new romance (Kim Greist) proves to be a major distraction.
| 22 | 22 | "Evan" | Rob Cohen | Paul Diamond | 121 | May 3, 1985 | 59518 | 15.2/26 |
The Vice Squad's investigation of an arms dealer (Al Israel) is complicated when Crockett encounters Evan Freed (William Russ), a former Vice cop-turned-ATF agent, whose past history with Crockett has left them both with a mutual hatred for each other.
| 23 | 23 | "Lombard" | John Nicolella | Story by : Joel Surnow; Teleplay by : David Assael | 122 | May 10, 1985 | 59529 | 16.3/28 |
Crockett and Tubbs are assigned to provide witness protection for infamous Miami mobster Al Lombard, who is set to testify against a Mafia family as part of a plea bargain to reduce his sentence, but the family won't let him go away so easily.

=== Season 2 (1985–86) ===
Season two of Miami Vice premiered on September 27, 1985, with the two-hour episode "The Prodigal Son". The second season concluded on May 9, 1986, after 23 episodes. Season two regular cast members included Don Johnson, Philip Michael Thomas, Saundra Santiago, Michael Talbott, John Diehl, Olivia Brown and Edward James Olmos.

| No. overall | No. in season | Title | Directed by | Written by | Film order | Original release date | Prod. code | Rating/share (households) |
|---|---|---|---|---|---|---|---|---|
| 24 | 1 | "The Prodigal Son" | Paul Michael Glaser | Daniel Pyne | 201 | September 27, 1985 | 60013 | 23.2/37 |
| 25 | 2 | "The Prodigal Son" | Paul Michael Glaser | Daniel Pyne | 201 | September 27, 1985 | 60013 | 23.2/37 |
Crockett and Tubbs go to New York City to assist the DEA in hunting down a gang of Colombian drug dealers responsible for killing several undercover agents who were posing as dealers in Miami. Meanwhile, Tubbs reunites with his old flame Valerie (Pam Grier). Note: Originally shown as a two-hour TV movie, but in syndication is shown as two episodes.
| 26 | 3 | "Whatever Works" | John Nicolella | Maurice Hurley | 202 | October 4, 1985 | 60025 | 21.0/35 |
Crockett, Tubbs and Castillo seek guidance from a Santería priestess (Eartha Kitt) while investigating the ritualistic murders of police officers and drug dealers. Meanwhile, Izzy helps Crockett get back his Ferrari Daytona after it is repossessed by a city accountant.
| 27 | 4 | "Out Where the Buses Don't Run" | Jim Johnston | Teleplay by : Douglas Lloyd MacIntosh & John Mankiewicz; Story by : Joel Surnow & Douglas Lloyd MacIntosh | 203 | October 18, 1985 | 60006 | 19.9/34 |
A retired Vice detective (Bruce McGill) offers to assist Crockett and Tubbs with their latest case. The only problem? The man the former detective claims is running the drug ring they are investigating supposedly died years ago. In 1997, TV Guide ranked this episode #90 on its list of the 100 Greatest Episodes.
| 28 | 5 | "The Dutch Oven" | Abel Ferrara | Maurice Hurley | 204 | October 25, 1985 | 59526 | 19.8/34 |
Trudy is torn between duty and romance when she learns that her boyfriend (Cleavant Derricks) is best friends with a drug dealer (Giancarlo Esposito) who has connections to a big-time supplier the Vice Squad is trying to bring down.
| 29 | 6 | "Buddies" | Harry Mastrogeorge | Frank Military | 205 | November 1, 1985 | 60020 | 20.6/35 |
A nightclub waitress goes on the run from Mafia hitmen after accidentally taking evidence of their illegal gambling ring from her workplace. As the Vice Squad tries to track her down, Crockett learns that the club's manager, his old friend Robbie Cann (James Remar) may be involved with the girl's disappearance.
| 30 | 7 | "Junk Love" | Michael O'Herlihy | Julia Cameron | 207 | November 8, 1985 | 60017 | 22.0/38 |
Crockett and Tubbs attempt to use an elusive heroin trafficker's girlfriend, a drug-addicted prostitute, to get closer to him. But they soon learn that her connection to the man is far deeper, and more disturbing, than they could have imagined. Miles Davis makes a guest appearance as Ivory Jones.
| 31 | 8 | "Tale of the Goat" | Michael O'Herlihy | Jim Trombetta | 209 | November 15, 1985 | 60036 | 22.1/36 |
Tubbs crosses paths with a Haitian voodoo priest (Clarence Williams III), who has apparently returned from the dead to kill a business associate (Mykelti Williamson) who double-crossed him years ago.
| 32 | 9 | "Bushido" | Edward James Olmos | John Leekley | 210 | November 22, 1985 | 60042 | 23.7/38 |
Castillo's old friend Jack Gretsky (Dean Stockwell), a retired CIA agent, reveals that he is dying of lung cancer, and asks Castillo to protect his wife, a Soviet defector, and their son from the KGB assassins that are pursuing them.
| 33 | 10 | "Bought and Paid For" | John Nicolella | Marvin Kupfer | 206 | November 29, 1985 | 60024 | 24.3/41 |
Gina's friend Odette (Lynn Whitfield), a Haitian immigrant, is raped by the psychotic son (Joaquim de Almeida) of an exiled Bolivian general living in Miami. The Vice Squad's subsequent investigation soon becomes complicated by Odette's sudden recantation of her story.
| 34 | 11 | "Back in the World" | Don Johnson | Terry McDonnell | 211 | December 6, 1985 | 60023 | 23.2/38 |
Ira Stone (Bob Balaban), Crockett's journalist friend from the Vietnam War, arrives in Miami looking for help to break a story connecting a CIA operative (G. Gordon Liddy) to a drug ring that smuggled heroin into the United States in the body bags of dead soldiers. Patti D'Arbanville makes a guest appearance as Ira Stone's wife. The first of four episodes directed by Don Johnson.
| 35 | 12 | "Phil the Shill" | John Nicolella | Paul Diamond | 212 | December 13, 1985 | 60037 | 23.9/39 |
Switek is forced to put his vendetta against a sleazy con artist (Phil Collins) who swindled him on hold when the Vice Squad learns they may be able to use the grifter to bring down a big-time cocaine dealer.
| 36 | 13 | "Definitely Miami" | Rob Cohen | Michael Ahnemann & Daniel Pyne | 213 | January 10, 1986 | 60012 | 24.0/38 |
Crockett suspects a set-up when a mysterious woman (Arielle Dombasle) tries to seduce him and asks for help getting away from her abusive husband (Ted Nugent). Meanwhile, an elusive cocaine trafficker offers to turn himself in to the Vice Squad in exchange for a face-to-face meeting with his sister, a protected witness who testified against him.
| 37 | 14 | "Yankee Dollar" | Aaron Lipstadt | Daniel Pyne & John Mankiewicz | 214 | January 17, 1986 | 60047 | 22.2/37 |
Crockett's stewardess girlfriend dies suddenly, and her autopsy reveals ruptured balloons of cocaine in her stomach. As the Vice Squad investigates, they learn she was muling the drugs for a sleazy corporate raider (Ned Eisenberg) who is setting himself up as the middleman for a major impending deal.
| 38 | 15 | "One Way Ticket" | Craig Bolotin | Craig Bolotin | 208 | January 24, 1986 | 60040 | 24.1/39 |
When an ADA mutual friend of theirs is assassinated by a drug trafficker, Crockett plays to the conflicted conscience of the trafficker’s lawyer (John Heard) in an attempt to get him to flip on his client. Features the song Face the Face by Pete Townshend. Jan Hammer has a brief cameo as the musician at the wedding reception playing his composition "Rum Cay".
| 39 | 16 | "Little Miss Dangerous" | Leon Ichaso | Frank Military | 215 | January 31, 1986 | 60038 | 21.4/36 |
As the police scour the city searching for the "Crayon Killer", a serial killer who leaves childlike drawings next to their victim's bodies, Tubbs tries to help a teenage prostitute (Fiona) turn her life around, unaware that he may be closer to the Crayon Killer than he realizes.
| 40 | 17 | "Florence Italy" | John Nicolella | Wilton Crawley | 216 | February 14, 1986 | 60011 | 21.8/36 |
Crockett and Tubbs investigate the murder of a teenage prostitute, and a big-time Grand Prix racer (Danny Sullivan) ends up at the top of their suspect list. But is the driver really responsible, or is it someone close to him?
| 41 | 18 | "French Twist" | David Jackson | Teleplay by : Jaron Summers; Story by : Michael Hoggan & Jaron Summers | 217 | February 21, 1986 | 60049 | 23.3/38 |
Crockett strikes up a romance with a French Interpol agent (Lisa Eichhorn) who is in Miami pursuing a drug-dealing assassin, but Tubbs suspects she might not be who she says she is.
| 42 | 19 | "The Fix" | Dick Miller | Chuck Adamson | 218 | March 7, 1986 | 60004 | 21.1/34 |
After a respected judge (Bill Russell) sets a ridiculously low bail for a drug dealer, Crockett and Tubbs investigate the man and learn that he owes a large gambling debt to a violent loan shark (Michael Richards), who wants the judge to convince his son (Bernard King), a college basketball star, to throw his next game.
| 43 | 20 | "Payback" | Aaron Lipstadt | Robert Crais | 219 | March 14, 1986 | 60048 | 21.2/36 |
Crockett learns that a prominent drug trafficker (Frank Zappa) believes Crockett's undercover alias, Sonny Burnett, has stolen $3 million from him, and must find out who set him up before the trafficker's hitmen get to him.
| 44 | 21 | "Free Verse" | John Nicolella | Teleplay by : Jim Trombetta; Story by : Shel Willens & Jim Trombetta | 220 | April 4, 1986 | 60005 | 21.0/36 |
The Vice Squad is assigned to protect a Latin American poet who has been targeted for assassination by both his home country's secret police, who want him silenced, and the anti-government guerrillas, who want to make him a martyr.
| 45 | 22 | "Trust Fund Pirates" | Jim Johnston | Daniel Pyne | 221 | May 2, 1986 | 60027 | 19.2/33 |
Crockett and Tubbs recruit a semi-retired smuggler (Gary Cole) in their efforts to take down a gang of rich kids who are killing off drug runners and stealing their cargo to resell it.
| 46 | 23 | "Sons and Lovers" | John Nicolella | Dennis Cooper | 222 | May 9, 1986 | 60008 | 18.8/33 |
Angelina, Esteban Calderone's daughter, returns and reveals to Tubbs that he fathered her child. However, she also informs him that her half-brother, Orlando Calderone (John Leguizamo), is in Miami and preparing to avenge the death of his father.

=== Season 3 (1986–87) ===
Season three of Miami Vice premiered on September 26, 1986, with the episode "When Irish Eyes Are Crying". The third season concluded on May 8, 1987, after 24 episodes. Season three regular cast members included Don Johnson, Philip Michael Thomas, Saundra Santiago, Michael Talbott, John Diehl, Olivia Brown and Edward James Olmos. Changes in season three included Dick Wolf joining the crew as executive producer working with Michael Mann, different style and fashion looks, the introduction of the Ferrari Testarossa, Sonny Crockett's new car and the death of Larry Zito (Diehl).

| No. overall | No. in season | Title | Directed by | Written by | Film order | Original release date | Prod. code | Rating/share (households) |
|---|---|---|---|---|---|---|---|---|
| 47 | 1 | "When Irish Eyes Are Crying" | Mario Di Leo | Teleplay by : Dick Wolf & John Leekley; Story by : John Leekley | 302 | September 26, 1986 | 62004 | 17.4/28 |
Gina begins a romance with a reformed Irish revolutionary (Liam Neeson), but the rest of the Vice Squad soon learns that his charitable crusade may be cover for a planned operation to buy elite weaponry and strike a British target in Miami.
| 48 | 2 | "Stone's War" | David Jackson | David Jackson | 303 | October 3, 1986 | 62012 | 17.4/27 |
Ira Stone (Bob Balaban) returns to Miami looking to break a story on American mercenaries operating illegally in Nicaragua, and asks for Crockett's protection from assassins sent after him by their mutual adversary, crooked CIA agent William Maynard (G. Gordon Liddy).
| 49 | 3 | "Killshot" | Leon Ichaso | Teleplay by : Marvin Kupfer; Story by : Marvin Kupfer & Leon Ichaso & Manuel Arce | 304 | October 10, 1986 | 62018 | 18.0/29 |
The Vice Squad's joint operation with U.S. Customs against a cocaine trafficker is jeopardized when the dealer frames a Customs agent's brother, a talented Jai alai player (Fernando Allende), for a prostitute's murder.
| 50 | 4 | "Walk-Alone" | David Jackson | W.K. Scott Meyer | 305 | October 17, 1986 | 62014 | 17.1/28 |
Tubbs risks his life when he goes under cover as a prison inmate in order to expose a drug ring being run by two corrupt corrections officers (Laurence Fishburne and Kevin Conway).
| 51 | 5 | "The Good Collar" | Mario Di Leo | Dennis Cooper | 306 | October 24, 1986 | 62001 | 17.9/29 |
After Crockett catches a promising high school football player (Vincent Keith Ford) delivering heroin to an understood dealer, he tries to convince the teen to save his athletic career by helping the Vice Squad bring down a teenage drug lord.
| 52 | 6 | "Shadow in the Dark" | Christopher Crowe | Chuck Adamson | 307 | October 31, 1986 | 62003 | 16.4/27 |
Crockett tries to get inside the head of a mentally unstable home invader in order to catch him before his crimes turn violent, despite the fact that the last cop who tried that approach ended up in a mental hospital.
| 53 | 7 | "El Viejo" | Aaron Lipstadt | Alan Moskowitz | 301 | November 7, 1986 | 62009 | 17.4/28 |
Crockett's investigation of a drug ring is complicated by the interference of a retired Texas Ranger (Willie Nelson) who has mistaken Crockett's undercover identity as a drug dealer for the real thing.
| 54 | 8 | "Better Living Through Chemistry" | Leon Ichaso | Teleplay by : Dick Wolf & Michael Duggan; Story by : Ken Edwards & Harold Rosenthal | 310 | November 14, 1986 | 62007 | 16.5/26 |
Clarence Batisse (Victor Love) Tubbs' former partner from New York is out for revenge, believing that Tubbs is responsible for getting him kicked off the force, and threatens to derail the Vice Squad's latest investigation when he kidnaps a drug dealer's chemist.
| 55 | 9 | "Baby Blues" | Daniel Attias | Teleplay by : Michael Duggan; Story by : Dick Wolf & Michael Duggan | 309 | November 21, 1986 | 62017 | 18.6/29 |
The Vice Squad begins investigating an illegal adoption and human trafficking ring after an interdicted Colombian airplane thought to be full of drugs turns out to contain live human infants.
| 56 | 10 | "Streetwise" | Fred Walton | Dennis Cooper | 308 | December 5, 1986 | 62002 | 18.3/29 |
While Crockett tries to convince an undercover cop (Bill Paxton) with a wife and child at home to break off his affair with a prostitute (Alice Adair), Tubbs goes under cover to bring down a violent, drug-dealing pimp (Wesley Snipes) responsible for selling pharmaceutical-grade cocaine.
| 57 | 11 | "Forgive Us Our Debts" | Jan Eliasberg | Gustave Reininger | 311 | December 12, 1986 | 62013 | 16.7/27 |
Crockett does all he can to stop the execution of Frank Hackman (Guy Boyd), the man convicted of killing his former partner (Luke Halpin), after new evidence is uncovered that seems to prove his innocence.
| 58 | 12 | "Down for the Count" (Part 1) | Richard Compton | Teleplay by : Dick Wolf & John Schulian; Story by : Dick Wolf | 313 | January 9, 1987 | 62020 | 15.1/23 |
Zito goes under cover as trainer for a young boxer (Mark Breland) to expose a ruthless drug lord with a passion for the sport, but the investigation takes a tragic turn when Zito's cover is blown and he is then killed by the drug lord's hitmen.
| 59 | 13 | "Down for the Count" (Part 2) | Richard Compton | Teleplay by : Dick Wolf & John Schulian; Story by : Dick Wolf | 314 | January 16, 1987 | 62023 | 20.3/32 |
Switek is upset when Internal Affairs begins investigating Zito on suspicion of corruption, and sets out to clear his dead partner's name. Meanwhile, the Vice Squad attempts to salvage its floundering investigation of the drug lord that killed their comrade.
| 60 | 14 | "Cuba Libre" | Virgil W. Vogel | Eric Estrin & Michael Berlin | 315 | January 23, 1987 | 62015 | 20.0/30 |
An undercover cop is killed when a group of paramilitary soldiers attempt to rob a drug dealer, and the killers' trail leads Castillo and the Vice Squad to an anti-Communist militia plotting to assassinate a visiting Cuban diplomat.
| 61 | 15 | "Duty and Honor" "The Savage" | John Nicolella | Marvin Kupfer | 316 | February 6, 1987 | 62019 | 16.3/26 |
A series of recent prostitute murders closely resemble similar deaths Castillo investigated while in Vietnam, and his suspicion that the killer is the same one from before are confirmed when the Vietnamese detective (Haing S. Ngor) he worked with on the previous case arrives in Miami looking for his help bringing the killer to justice.
| 62 | 16 | "Theresa" | Virgil W. Vogel | Pamela Norris | 317 | February 13, 1987 | 62024 | 16.2/26 |
When the Vice Squad's case against a major trafficker (Brad Dourif) goes up in smoke after a police warehouse is bombed, Crockett learns that the bombers got the hidden warehouse's address from his girlfriend (Helena Bonham Carter), a painkiller-addicted ER doctor who has turned to street dealers to get her fix.
| 63 | 17 | "The Afternoon Plane" | David Jackson | David Jackson | 312 | February 20, 1987 | 62022 | 16.4/25 |
Tubbs' vacation on a small Caribbean island with his girlfriend soon turns into a nightmare when his nemesis Orlando Calderone (John Leguizamo) arrives and uses a hit squad with the intention of avenging his father and finally killing him.
| 64 | 18 | "Lend Me an Ear" | James Quinn | Story by : Dick Wolf; Teleplay by : Michael Duggan | 318 | February 27, 1987 | 62027 | 17.2/27 |
Steve Duddy (John Glover), a former police surveillance expert who now works as a private security consultant, agrees to help Crockett and Tubbs by supplying them with equipment to nab drug dealers, while simultaneously selling similar equipment to the same dealers the Vice Squad is trying to nail.
| 65 | 19 | "Red Tape" | Gabrielle Beaumont | Story by : Dennis Cooper; Teleplay by : Jonathan Polansky | 320 | March 13, 1987 | 62029 | 15.2/24 |
After undercover rookie Vice cop Eddie Trumbull (Viggo Mortensen) is killed by a booby trap while working a case, Internal Affairs begin investigating Tubbs on suspicion of selling information to drug dealers. Tubbs almost turns in his badge in anger, but is eventually convinced that the only way to clear his name is to pretend to be the dirty cop everyone thinks he is in order to expose the real source of the leak. Meanwhile, Eddie's partner Bobby Diaz (Lou Diamond Phillips) sets out for revenge.
| 66 | 20 | "By Hooker By Crook" | Don Johnson | Story by : Dick Wolf; Teleplay by : John Schulian | 319 | March 20, 1987 | 62026 | 17.3/28 |
Crockett's latest romance with a respected businesswoman (Melanie Griffith) turns sour when it is revealed that the woman is actually a high-class madam with connections to a notorious money launderer (George Takei) who is protected by henchman (Lou Albano).
| 67 | 21 | "Knock, Knock...Who's There?" | Tony Wharmby | Story by : Dick Wolf; Teleplay by : John Schulian | 321 | March 27, 1987 | 62028 | 16.8/29 |
Crockett and Tubbs investigate a gang of stickup men who have been derailing Vice Squad drug busts by posing as Federal agents and making off with the drugs and the buy money.
| 68 | 22 | "Viking Bikers From Hell" | James Quinn | Teleplay by : Dick Wolf & Michael Duggan; Story by : Walter Kurtz | 322 | April 3, 1987 | 62032 | 15.8/25 |
When the leader (Reb Brown) of a gang of violent, drug-dealing bikers is released from prison, he sets out on a bloody mission of revenge against those he feels were responsible for the death of one of his comrades while he was locked up, a list that includes Crockett.
| 69 | 23 | "Everybody's in Show Biz" | Richard Compton | Teleplay by : David Burke; Story by : Reinaldo Povod & Dennis Cooper | 323 | May 1, 1987 | 62031 | 13.2/22 |
A talented local stage actor attempts to save a struggling community theater by stealing the briefcase of a drug dealer (Paul Calderón), but this puts his own life in jeopardy.
| 70 | 24 | "Heroes of the Revolution" | Gabrielle Beaumont | Story by : Dick Wolf; Teleplay by : John Schulian | 324 | May 8, 1987 | 62033 | 11.7/20 |
An East German spy (Jeroen Krabbé) from Gina's mother's past returns to avenge her death at the hands of a drug-running former Cuban army officer the Vice Squad is investigating.

=== Season 4 (1987–88) ===
Season four of Miami Vice premiered on September 25, 1987, with the episode "Contempt of Court". The fourth season concluded on May 6, 1988, after 22 episodes. Season four regular cast members included Don Johnson, Philip Michael Thomas, Saundra Santiago, Michael Talbott, Olivia Brown and Edward James Olmos. The episodes "The Big Thaw", "Missing Hours" and "The Cows of October" are considered among fans to be the worst in the series.

| No. overall | No. in season | Title | Directed by | Written by | Film order | Original release date | Prod. code | Rating/share (households) |
|---|---|---|---|---|---|---|---|---|
| 71 | 1 | "Contempt of Court" | Jan Eliasberg | Peter McCabe | 403 | September 25, 1987 | 63504 | 16.2/29 |
Frank Mosca (Stanley Tucci), a big-time mobster, has one of Crockett's old friends killed to prevent him from testifying in court. As Mosca's trial approaches, Crockett has to try to stop his friend's son from taking revenge on Mosca.
| 72 | 2 | "Amen... Send Money" | James J. Quinn | John Schulian | 402 | October 2, 1987 | 63502 | 15.9/28 |
When a drug ring investigation turns up a connection to two feuding televangelists, Rev. Billy Bob Proverb (Brian Dennehy) and Mason Mather (James Tolkan), one of them attempts to derail the police probe by framing Tubbs for raping one of their parishioners. "Fast" Eddie Felcher (Ben Stiller) a former con-artist helps Crockett and Tubbs get information from on the feud between Proverb and Mather.
| 73 | 3 | "Death and the Lady" | Colin Bucksey | David Black | 401 | October 16, 1987 | 63501 | 14.3/24 |
Crockett suspects an eccentric porno director (Paul Guilfoyle) killed the star of his latest movie on camera, and is now attempting to pass off the snuff film as artistic erotica.
| 74 | 4 | "The Big Thaw" | Richard Compton | Joseph DeBlasi | 404 | October 23, 1987 | 63507 | 13.4/23 |
An investigation takes a turn for the weird when the Vice Squad find themselves embroiled in a dispute over the cryogenically frozen corpse of a famous reggae musician who disappeared years ago.
| 75 | 5 | "Child's Play" | Vern Gillum | Story by : Priscilla Turner; Teleplay by : Michael Piller | 405 | October 30, 1987 | 63508 | 13.9/23 |
The Vice Squad's attempted arrest of an arms dealer (Ving Rhames) goes badly, resulting in Crockett accidentally shooting a young boy who points a Belgian Browning Hi-Power pistol at him during the raid which puts Crockett's entire career in jeopardy.
| 76 | 6 | "God's Work" | Jan Eliasberg | Edward Tivnan | 406 | November 6, 1987 | 63503 | 11.1/19 |
The Vice Squad sets its sights on a drug kingpin's son (Esai Morales), who has returned to Miami after a long absence to help run the family business.
| 77 | 7 | "Missing Hours" | Ate de Jong | Thomas M. Disch | 407 | November 13, 1987 | 63515 | 14.1/23 |
While the Vice Squad investigates a UFO cult leader (James Brown) with suspected ties to the drug trade, Trudy has a bizarre encounter with something she cannot possibly explain.
| 78 | 8 | "Like a Hurricane" | Colin Bucksey | Robert Palm | 408 | November 20, 1987 | 63511 | 16.8/27 |
While working a protection detail for Caitlin Davies (Sheena Easton), a recording artist whose life has been threatened by a racketeering ring, Crockett finds himself falling in love with his charge.
| 79 | 9 | "The Rising Sun of Death" | Leon Ichaso | Peter Lance | 409 | December 4, 1987 | 63506 | 14.4/24 |
The Vice Squad's investigation of a murder connected to a suspected Yakuza prostitution ring is complicated by the arrival of a former Japanese detective (Cary-Hiroyuki Tagawa) who is out for revenge against the gang's leader.
| 80 | 10 | "Love at First Sight" | Don Johnson | Peter McCabe | 410 | January 15, 1988 | 63517 | 15.5/25 |
Caitlin becomes concerned for Crockett's own life when he reluctantly agrees to go under cover in a popular video dating service to catch a sadistic serial killer who is on the loose.
| 81 | 11 | "A Rock and a Hard Place" | Colin Bucksey | Story by : Dick Wolf; Teleplay by : Robert Palm | 411 | January 22, 1988 | 63512 | 13.2/22 |
Two ruthless Los Angeles music executives are out to ruin Caitlin's comeback by exposing her secret marriage to Crockett's drug-dealing cover identity, Sonny Burnett.
| 82 | 12 | "The Cows of October" | Vern Gillum | Ed Zuckerman | 412 | February 5, 1988 | 63510 | 14.1/23 |
The Vice Squad becomes involved in a bidding war between an American cowboy, the Federal government, and Cuban agents over a supply of rare, high-quality cattle sperm.
| 83 | 13 | "Vote of Confidence" | Randy Roberts | John Schulian | 414 | February 12, 1988 | 63520 | 13.6/22 |
A respected, but secretly corrupt gubernatorial candidate (Larry Pine) is caught in a prostitution ring bust. Fearing for his precious reputation, he is ready to do anything to silence the Vice Squad from revealing his true nature.
| 84 | 14 | "Baseballs of Death" | Bill Duke | Peter Lance | 415 | February 19, 1988 | 63522 | 13.6/21 |
The double murder of a prostitute and her pimp leads the Vice Squad to a Chilean National Police chief (Tony Plana) who has come to Miami to buy cluster bombs for the Pinochet regime from a notorious arms dealer (Oliver Platt).
| 85 | 15 | "Indian Wars" | Leon Ichaso | Teleplay by : Michael Duggan & Peter Lance & Robert Palm and Carl Waldman & Frank Coffey; Story by : Frank Coffey & Carl Waldman | 413 | February 26, 1988 | 63514 | 12.7/21 |
Tubbs goes under cover at a Florida Indian reservation to uncover the connection between a Native rights group and a drug trafficker (Joe Turkel) that Castillo is helping bring down.
| 86 | 16 | "Honor Among Thieves?" | Jim Johnston | Jack Richardson | 416 | March 4, 1988 | 63519 | 14.5/24 |
A delusional serial killer with an affinity for glass dolls is killing young girls, but revealing him would threaten Crockett and Tubbs' cover.
| 87 | 17 | "Hell Hath No Fury" | Virgil W. Vogel | Story by : David Black; Teleplay by : Michael Duggan | 417 | March 11, 1988 | 63521 | 13.6/23 |
A rapist from a wealthy family is released from prison, and while trying to start fresh and anew, Trudy fears that the victim will avenge her distraught situation by killing the man.
| 88 | 18 | "Badge of Dishonor" | Richard Compton | Teleplay by : Michael Duggan & Peter Lance; Story by : Dick Wolf | 418 | March 18, 1988 | 63524 | 13.7/23 |
Crockett and Tubbs investigate a series of murders by the Miami docks involving drug dealers and crooked cops.
| 89 | 19 | "Blood & Roses" | George Mendeluk | Story by : Dick Wolf; Teleplay by : Robert Palm | 419 | April 1, 1988 | 63523 | 14.3/26 |
Frank Mosca returns to Miami, and Crockett is eager to avenge his friend's murder by bringing him down. Gina goes under cover to get close to Mosca, but the assignment becomes complicated when the mobster ends up falling for her.
| 90 | 20 | "A Bullet for Crockett" | Donald L. Gold | Teleplay by : Peter Lance & Michael Duggan; Story by : Dick Wolf | 420 | April 15, 1988 | 63525 | 14.4/26 |
Crockett clings to life in the hospital after being shot and put in a coma by the girlfriend (Lisa Vidal) of a drug dealer he killed in self-defense. While Crockett is in surgery, Tubbs and the other members of the Vice Squad reminisce about their memories with Crockett.
| 91 | 21 | "Deliver Us From Evil" | George Mendeluk | Teleplay by : David Black & Michael Duggan & Robert Palm; Story by : Dick Wolf | 421 | April 29, 1988 | 63528 | 13.3/24 |
Frank Hackman returns and kills Caitlin during her returning concert after Crockett accidentally kills Hackman's girlfriend during a drug bust. Crockett, setting out for revenge, goes to hunt him down.
| 92 | 22 | "Mirror Image" (Part 1) | Richard Compton | Teleplay by : Robert Palm & Daniel Sackheim; Story by : Nelson Oramas & Daniel Sackheim | 422 | May 6, 1988 | 63526 | 14.8/26 |
Crockett gets amnesia while on board a drug dealer's boat that explodes. He is then rescued by the shady dealer (Antonio Fargas), and Crockett is left believing that he is his undercover drug dealer alter-ego Burnett.

=== Season 5 (1988–90) ===
Season five of Miami Vice is the final season of the series. The season premiered on November 4, 1988, with the episode "Hostile Takeover (Part 2)". The series concluded on May 21, 1989, with "Freefall", after 17 episodes, but later NBC aired three new episodes after the series finale. They were "World of Trouble" (June 14, 1989), "Miracle Man" (June 21, 1989), and "Leap of Faith" (June 28, 1989). Additionally, USA Network aired "Too Much, Too Late" on January 25, 1990, since NBC would not show that episode due to its strong topic of child molestation (NBC and USA shared a corporate parent by 2002). Season five regular cast members included Don Johnson, Philip Michael Thomas, Saundra Santiago, Michael Talbott, Olivia Brown, and Edward James Olmos.

| No. overall | No. in season | Title | Directed by | Written by | Film order | Original release date | Prod. code | Viewers (millions) | Rating/share (households) |
|---|---|---|---|---|---|---|---|---|---|
| 93 | 1 | "Hostile Takeover" (Part 2) | Don Johnson | Ken Solarz | 501 | November 4, 1988 | 63905 | 18.0 | 12.2/21 |
Sonny still assumes the identity of Burnett, unaware of his past as a police officer. Burnett has now gained full control of a powerful drug empire. Will Tubbs finally manage to get Crockett back to his past self?
| 94 | 2 | "Redemption in Blood" (Part 3) | Paul Krasny | Story by : Robert Ward; Teleplay by : Scott Shepherd & Ken Solarz | 502 | November 11, 1988 | 63906 | 19.7 | 13.1/23 |
Crockett's memory begins to come back, just as Tubbs begins a plan to take him down on orders.
| 95 | 3 | "Heart of Night" | Paul Krasny | James Becket | 503 | November 18, 1988 | 63904 | 15.6 | 10.9/19 |
Castillo must protect his ex-wife May Ying (Rosalind Chao) from a drug lord. Also, Mai Ying's current husband, Ma Sek (James Saito), may have connections to the drug lord.
| 96 | 4 | "Bad Timing" | Virgil W. Vogel | Scott Shepherd | 505 | December 2, 1988 | 63907 | 18.8 | 12.6/22 |
Crockett takes a much needed vacation by traveling upstate, only to find himself kidnapped by two homicidal prison escapees who would rather die than get arrested again.
| 97 | 5 | "Borrasca" | Vern Gillum | Elvis Cole & Vladislavo Stepankutza | 504 | December 9, 1988 | 63901 | 17.2 | 11.7/21 |
Tubbs and Castillo are asked not to be involved in a drug deal involving a government agent, but this proves to be easier said than done.
| 98 | 6 | "Line of Fire" | Richard Compton | Raymond Hartung | 506 | December 16, 1988 | 63908 | 18.0 | 12.1/22 |
Crockett and Tubbs must protect a young man (Justin Lazard) who is a key witness in a local drug lord's upcoming trial.
| 99 | 7 | "Asian Cut" | James Contner | Story by : Robert Ward; Teleplay by : Peter McCabe | 507 | January 13, 1989 | 63909 | 16.5 | 10.8/18 |
Trudy goes under cover as a call girl to lure out a sadistic serial killer who leaves his victims with distinctive knife marks, but as she becomes his next victim, the Vice Squad must hunt him down before he harms her.
| 100 | 8 | "Hard Knocks" | Vern Gillum | Story by : Scott Shepherd & Ken Solarz & Robert Ward; Teleplay by : Ken Solarz | 508 | January 20, 1989 | 63910 | 17.2 | 11.2/19 |
Switek tries to convince his friend's son, a major college quarterback, to throw a game, to break even with a local hustler to whom he owes a large gambling debt.
| 101 | 9 | "Fruit of the Poison Tree" | Michelle Manning | Rob Bragin | 509 | February 3, 1989 | 63912 | 16.2 | 10.2/16 |
Crockett and Tubbs investigate a shady and very corrupt state lawyer who defends drug dealers, then steals and resells their drugs.
| 102 | 10 | "To Have and to Hold" | Eugene Corr | William Conway | 510 | February 10, 1989 | 63913 | 17.1 | 11.4/19 |
While under cover, Tubbs falls for the widow of a slain drug kingpin. Meanwhile, Crockett leaves to be with his son who is not happy about his mother, Crockett's ex-wife (Belinda Montgomery) having another child.
| 103 | 11 | "Miami Squeeze" | Michelle Manning | Story by : Ted Mann & Peter McCabe & Robert Ward; Teleplay by : Ted Mann & Peter McCabe | 511 | February 17, 1989 | 63917 | 14.9 | 10.7/18 |
An anti-drug Congresswoman's (Rita Moreno) campaign is jeopardized when her son steals a shipment of drugs from a big-time English kingpin to earn some quick money.
| 104 | 12 | "Jack of All Trades" | Vern Gillum | Story by : Robert Ward; Teleplay by : Ken Solarz | 512 | March 3, 1989 | 63911 | 15.1 | 10.0/16 |
Crockett's scheming cousin Jack (David Andrews) unintentionally gets involved with a dangerous drug lord while trying to con him.
| 105 | 13 | "The Cell Within" | Michael B. Hoggan | Jack Richardson | 513 | March 10, 1989 | 63902 | 13.3 | 9.4/16 |
Jack Manning (John P. Ryan), a former criminal that Tubbs had previously imprisoned in New York City, is now a best-selling author living in Miami and invites Tubbs to dinner. At Manning's house, he reveals to Tubbs that he has imprisoned several people for petty crimes. Manning then imprisons Tubbs for not agreeing to follow his plan to "rid the world of evil".
| 106 | 14 | "The Lost Madonna" | Chip Chalmers | Robert Goethals | 514 | March 17, 1989 | 63914 | 13.2 | 9.2/17 |
Crockett and Tubbs agree to help an artsy NYPD detective (Michael Chiklis) retrieve a 15th century work of art the Madonna, which had been stolen from a Paris museum several years earlier and is suspected to be now in Miami.
| 107 | 15 | "Over the Line" | Russ Mayberry | Story by : Robert Ward & Scott Shepherd; Teleplay by : Terry McDonell | 516 | April 28, 1989 | 63918 | 11.8 | 8.2/14 |
Crockett and Tubbs go deep under cover by joining an infamous group of disillusioned, vigilante cops, who serve their own justice against local criminals.
| 108 | 16 | "Victims of Circumstance" | Colin Bucksey | Richard Lourie | 515 | May 5, 1989 | 63915 | 11.7 | 7.9/14 |
The Vice Squad learn that witnesses of The Holocaust are being murdered one by one, forcing Crockett and Switek to go under cover in a White supremacist Neo-Nazi group.
| 109 | 17 | "World of Trouble"^{[†]} | Alan Myerson | Raymond Hartung | 517 | June 14, 1989 | 63922 | 14.7 | 10.8/20 |
Former mob boss Al Lombard (Dennis Farina), who was believed to be dead, returns with a different perspective on his life, to try to convince his beloved son to stay out of the mafia family business.
| 110 | 18 | "Miracle Man"^{[†]} | Alan Myerson | Story by : Gillian Horvath & Robert Ward; Teleplay by : Rob Bragin | 518 | June 21, 1989 | 63921 | 14.3 | 10.0/19 |
A delusional vigilante named "Miracle Man" frequently interferes with Tubbs and Switek's investigation of a major drug dealer.
| 111 | 19 | "Leap of Faith"^{[†]}^{[†2]} | Robert Iscove | Robert Ward | 519 | June 28, 1989 | 63923 | 16.1 | 11.0/21 |
A Youth Crime Unit goes under cover as college students to investigate a shady professor (Keith Gordon) who is giving his students a dangerous drug.
| 112 | 20 | "Too Much, Too Late"^{[†]}^{[‡]} | Richard Compton | Story by : John A. Connor; Teleplay by : Jack Richardson | 520 | January 25, 1990 | 63903 | N/A | N/A |
Tubbs' old flame, Valerie (Pam Grier), returns to Miami to help her drug-addicted friend Yvonne (C.C.H. Pounder) who is a slave to her drug dealer's demands. As payment for her addiction, she forces her daughter, Lynette (Malinda Williams) to have sex with the dealer.
| 113 | 21 | "Freefall" | Russ Mayberry | Story by : Frank Holman & Scott Shepherd & Ken Solarz; Teleplay by : William Conway & Ken Solarz | 521 | May 21, 1989 | 63924 | 22.2 | 14.7/23 |
| 114 | 22 | "Freefall" | Russ Mayberry | Story by : Frank Holman & Scott Shepherd & Ken Solarz; Teleplay by : William Conway & Ken Solarz | 521 | May 21, 1989 | 63924 | 22.2 | 14.7/23 |
In the two-hour series finale, Crockett and Tubbs are recruited to protect Gen. Manuel Borbon (Ian McShane), a dictator of a ravaged Latin American country, who has information on major players in the drug underworld. It is later revealed that Borbon knew dirt on very high-ranking US government officials, which was the reason for the whole mission. By the end of the episode, Crockett and Tubbs shoot down Borbon's seaplane as he tries to escape the authorities, killing the General and several government operatives, and the pair quit the police force in disgust. In the final scene, Crockett has sold his boat, released his pet alligator Elvis, and is moving further south, hoping to get away from his life in Miami, while Tubbs has decided to move back to New York City. Crockett offers to give Tubbs a ride to the airport in his "stolen" Ferrari, and the duo drive away together. Note: Originally shown as a two-hour finale, but in syndication is shown as 2 separate episodes.

- † These "lost episodes" aired after the series finale aired on May 21, 1989. The first three episodes aired on NBC in June 1989, while the fourth one aired on USA Network in January 1990.
- †2 The episode "Leap of Faith" was a backdoor pilot for a potential series that did not come to fruition.
- ‡ The episode "Too Much, Too Late" was not shown on NBC due to its graphic content and a plot vividly involving child molestation, which at the time was considered unsuitable for prime time television.
