= Out Where the Buses Don't Run =

- Miami Vice episode
- Episode no.: Season 2 Episode 4
- Directed by: Jim Johnston
- Story by: Joel Surnow; Douglas Lloyd McIntosh
- Teleplay by: Douglas Lloyd McIntosh; John Mankiewicz
- Original air date: October 18, 1985

Guest appearances
- Bruce McGill as Hank Weldon; David Strathairn as Marty Lang; Little Richard as Marvelle Quinn

Episode chronology
← Previous "Whatever Works"	Next → "The Dutch Oven"

"Out Where the Buses Don't Run" is the third episode of the second season of the American crime drama television series Miami Vice, and the 27th episode overall. The episode first aired on NBC on October 18, 1985, and featured guest appearance by Bruce McGill as an eccentric retired police officer attempting to aid Metro-Dade detectives James "Sonny" Crockett and Ricardo Tubbs in the search for a missing drug lord.

The episode was the second of four in the series directed by Jim Johnston, and was written by John Mankiewicz and Douglas Lloyd McIntosh based on a story idea by McIntosh and Joel Surnow. "Out Where the Buses Don't Run" was well-received critically, earning a Primetime Emmy Award nomination for editor Robert A. Daniels, and appearing in TV Guide's 1997 list of the "100 Greatest TV Episodes of All Time".

== Plot ==
When James "Sonny" Crockett (Don Johnson) and Ricardo Tubbs (Philip Michael Thomas) arrest a small-time drug dealer, they receive a visit at the police station from a man Crockett recognizes as retired Vice squad officer Hank Weldon (Bruce McGill). Weldon informs the pair that the man they have arrested works for a drug lord called Tony Arcaro, who disappeared five years earlier, after narrowly avoiding a conviction.

Suspicious of Weldon's motives, and his seemingly unstable mental condition, Crockett and Tubbs visit his former police partner Marty Lang (David Strathairn), who informs them that Weldon was discharged on medical grounds rather than having retired. He had painstakingly built up a case against Arcaro and suffered a breakdown when the drug lord walked free on a technicality. When the pair leave, they find that Weldon has followed them, and is both defensive and furious concerning their visit to his partner. However, he reveals that Arcaro's successor, Freddie Constanza, is to be killed that day on Arcaro's orders. All three reach the location of the hit in time to witness Constanza's murder, and Weldon is arrested on suspicion of involvement.

Weldon is later released uncharged, and acting on information he overheard from his cell-mate, tips off Crockett and Tubbs to the location of a drug deal involving Arcaro's men. When the deal is interrupted and Arcaro found to be absent, Weldon is enraged and storms off. That night, Weldon places a call to the police station claiming he has found Arcaro. When Crockett and Tubbs arrive at the scene, an abandoned tenement building, they find a disturbed but lucid Weldon, who begins to tear down a plaster wall. Immured inside the wall is the corpse of Tony Arcaro and a newspaper from the day of his acquittal. Weldon acknowledges having killed Arcaro in response to the court trial, while Lang confesses to helping build the wall—to help his partner, flatly stating "He was my partner; you understand?" to Crockett, who confirms that he does.

== Production ==
The guy was a cop who had cracked up and spent the last seven or eight years in a lockup in Ft. Lauderdale for mentally disturbed cops. They had him doing characters, impersonations or whatever, and I decided that all he'd done since he'd been locked up was watch old movies. So whenever things didn't go his way, he would snap into a different character, whether it was Groucho Marx or Walter Brennan.

—McGill on his inspiration for Hank Weldon

"Out Where the Buses Don't Run" was the second of four in the series directed by Jim Johnston, after his debut for the series with the first season episode "Nobody Lives Forever". Johnston would also direct the later episodes "Trust Fund Pirates" and "Honor Among Thieves?". The episode was written by John Mankiewicz and Douglas Lloyd McIntosh based on a story idea by McIntosh and Joel Surnow. Although this would be McIntosh's only contribution to the series, Mankiewicz would write "Yankee Dollar" later in the same season.

As was customary for Miami Vice episodes, "Out Where the Buses Don't Run" made use of popular music. The opening scene features "Baba O'Riley" by The Who, and "Brothers in Arms" by Dire Straits plays during the climactic scene. Incidental music by series composer Jan Hammer is used for the remainder of the episode's score. Guest star Bruce McGill was cast only days before production began, after Dennis Hopper, for whom the role was written, pulled out. McGill flew from New York to Miami during the middle of the night to arrive on time, and began reading the script without having slept for some time. He based his interpretation of the character on the idea that Weldon would use his odd behavior as a defense mechanism when conversations did not go his way. McGill would later appear in several films directed by Miami Vice creator Michael Mann, including Collateral, The Insider, and Ali. McGill credits his "flamboyant" performance as Weldon for these roles, as well as for his casting as Jack Dalton on MacGyver.

== Broadcast and reception ==
"Out Where the Buses Don't Run" first aired on NBC on October 18, 1985, and has been well-received critically. The episode earned a Primetime Emmy Award nomination for editor Robert A. Daniels. The episode also appeared in TV Guide's 1997 list of the "100 Greatest TV Episodes of All Time". McGill's performance has also been praised as "virtuoso" and "disturbing".

Emily VanDerWerff, writing for The A.V. Club, felt that the episode replaced the "goofiness" of contemporary police dramas with "cold, dark cynicism", finding that the episode's dark ending "set a new standard for TV direction". DVD Verdict's Judge Ryan Keefer reviewed the episode positively, rating it a B+ and praising McGill's acting. The episode has also been examined by Stephen Sanders in his book Miami Vice, in which he describes the episode as tackling "a nearly ubiquitous noir theme", namely "the appearance of the past in the present". Sanders also described McGill's character Weldon as "lost in a noir void, neither redeemed nor justified". A retrospective overview of the series by Wired's Jennifer M. Wood highlighted "Out Where the Buses Don't Run", noting that it is "largely considered the single best episode of Miami Vice".

== Footnotes ==
=== References ===
- Conard, Mark T. (2007). The Philosophy of Neo-Noir. University Press of Kentucky. ISBN 978-0-8131-2422-3.
- MacGregor, Trish; MacGregor, Rob (2012). The Making of Miami Vice. Crossroad Press. ISBN 978-0-3453-3669-9.
- Moore, Allen F. (2003). Analyzing Popular Music. Cambridge University Press. ISBN 978-1-1394-3534-5.
- Sanders, Stephen (2010). Miami Vice: TV Milestones. Wayne State University Press. ISBN 978-0-8143-3419-5.
