= Brother's Keeper (Miami Vice) =

- Miami Vice episode
- "In the Air Tonight" scene from the episode
- Episode no.: Season 1 Episode 1
- Directed by: Thomas Carter
- Written by: Anthony Yerkovich
- Original air date: September 16, 1984

Guest appearances
- Jimmy Smits; Belinda Montgomery; Martin Ferrero; Miguel Pinero; Bill Smitrovich

Episode chronology
← Previous —	Next → "Heart of Darkness"

"Brother's Keeper" is the pilot episode of the American crime drama television series Miami Vice. Written by series creator Anthony Yerkovich and directed by Thomas Carter, the episode premiered on NBC on September 16, 1984, with a two-hour (including commercials) season premiere. The episode was received well critically, winning two out of three Emmy Awards for which it was nominated.

NBC would rebroadcast the episode in 2006 during the opening weekend for executive producer/director Michael Mann's theatrical remake starring Colin Farrell and Jamie Foxx.

== Plot ==
James "Sonny" Crockett (Don Johnson) is a Metro-Dade vice detective who loses his partner Eddie Rivera (Jimmy Smits) in a car bombing during an undercover operation with a small-time drug dealer. He also is in the middle of an ugly divorce, since his wife can't stand the stress of having a husband working undercover with criminals.

Crockett is investigating a Colombian drug dealer, named Calderone (Miguel Piñero), when he meets a New York police detective named Rafael Tubbs (Philip Michael Thomas). Since they are having problems approaching Calderone due to an unknown mole (leading Tubbs to say "You've got a leak in your department the size of the East River"), Crockett and Tubbs team up after a suggestion by the former's lieutenant Lou Rodriguez (Gregory Sierra), even though they don't like each other.

Crockett begins dating a colleague, Gina Calabrese (Saundra Santiago). However, on their first date, he whispers his ex-wife's name to Gina while they are in bed. Gina and her colleague Trudy Joplin (Olivia Brown) still help Crockett for all job matters, and they discover that Rafael Tubbs is actually a dead New York officer. Crockett confronts "Rafael" and discovers that he is Rafael's brother Ricardo ("Rico" for short) who wants to catch Calderone, his brother's murderer.

Crockett and Tubbs agree to still work together and it pays off, discovering that the traitor is Scott Wheeler (Bill Smitrovich), a DEA agent who works closely with the vice squad. After being confronted and assaulted by Crockett (his former partner), Wheeler is then arrested. Soon afterwards, Calderone himself is arrested, but within a matter of hours gets a judge to sign his release on $2 million bail. Sonny and Rico arrive just in time to see Calderone get into a seaplane and fly off. Crockett and Tubbs decide that they like working with each other after all, and Tubbs decides to transfer to Miami.

== Notes ==
Most of the series regular cast are introduced in this pilot episode: Sonny Crockett (Don Johnson), Ricardo Tubbs (Philip Michael Thomas), Gina Calabrese (Saundra Santiago), Trudy Joplin (Olivia Brown), Stan Switek (Michael Talbott) and Larry Zito (John Diehl). Only Edward James Olmos is missing, since his character, Lt. Martin Castillo would not show until the sixth episode. The Squad's boss was for the first four episodes Lt. Rodriguez (Gregory Sierra). This episode also featured regular supporting actor Martin Ferrero, but he played the transvestite killer Trini DeSoto instead of his usual Izzy Moreno character, the small and incompetent criminal who confides to Crockett and Tubbs. The opening theme to the episode is an extended version of the "Miami Vice Theme" which is only used for the first four episodes of the series. After that, the Miami Vice opening theme was altered to include the signature electric guitar riff over the original Fairlight-generated synthesizer sequence. From then on, it remained unchanged throughout the series.

This episode, which has a 2-hour duration (with commercials) is also sometimes split as a two-part episode each an hour long in some countries. On the Region 1 Miami Vice DVD release, the episode is presented in its entirety; the Region 2 version uses the two-part version.

At least one VHS release of "Brother's Keeper" replaces the Rolling Stones' song "Miss You" with generic rock music.

The seaplane Calderone gets into is Chalk's Ocean Airways Flight 101 registration number N2969; the aircraft notably crashed into the ocean in 2005, killing everyone on board.

== Style ==
This episode started developing the trademark Vice style. Aspects of Miami Vice considered revolutionary lay in its music, cinematography, and imagery, which made large segments of each episode resemble a protracted music video. A good example of combining these three aspects is found in this episode when Crockett and Tubbs are in the Ferrari Daytona Spyder, driving through a damp, nighttime Miami downtown heading to a somber showdown with a sinister, murderous drug lord as "In the Air Tonight" by Phil Collins surrealistically plays along. As Lee H. Katzin, one of the series' directors, once stated, "The show is written for an MTV audience, which is more interested in images, emotions and energy than plot and character and words."

Mann was dedicated to ensure that the show was as colorful as possible, and took inspiration from Miami's Art Deco era use of pastel colors. The "In The Air Tonight" sequence was visually inspired by Edward Hopper's Nighthawks; the "Bernay's Cafe" neon sign visible when Crockett makes his phonecall was added by the art department, even though a café itself isn't visible. The sequence also features no diegetic engine sounds from the vehicles.

The pilot included some of the series trademarks, such as Crocketts' Ferrari Daytona Spyder 365 GTS/4, his boat, the St. Vitus Dance and Elvis, his pet alligator. Other stylistic accents, such as Crockett's famous tortoise shell Ray-Ban Wayfarers or Tubbs's 1964 Cadillac Coupe de Ville were still missing (Crockett wears Carrera 5512 Large sunglasses, and Tubbs drives a dark 1983 Pontiac Trans Am in one scene).

== Awards and nominations ==
This episode was nominated for three Emmy awards and won two Emmys, for best sound editing and cinematography.

Year	Result	Award	Category	Recipient(s)
1985	Nominated	Emmy Award	Outstanding Writing in a Drama Series	Anthony Yerkovich
1985	Winner	Emmy Award	Outstanding Cinematography for a Series	Robert E. Collins, Cinematographer
1985	Winner	Emmy Award	Outstanding Film Sound Editing for a Series	Bruce Bell, Sound Editor; Jerry Sanford Cohen, Music Editor; Victor B. Lackey, Sound Editor; Ian MacGregor-Scott, Sound Editor; Carl Mahakian, Sound Editor; Chuck Moran, Supervising Sound Editor; John Oettinger, Sound Editor; Bernie Pincus, Sound Editor; Warren Smith, Sound Editor; Bruce Stambler, Sound Editor; Mike Wilhoit, Sound Editor; Paul Wittenberg, ADR Editor; Kyle Wright, Sound Editor

== Music ==
- "Miss You" by the Rolling Stones (replaced by generic, instrumental rock music for at least one VHS release of "Brother's Keeper" from MCA Home Video)
- "Body Talk" by the Deele
- "Somebody's Watching Me" by Rockwell
- "Girls Just Want to Have Fun" by Cyndi Lauper (cover version)
- "Only in Miami" by Bette Midler (sung by a band)
- "All Night Long (All Night)" by Lionel Richie (sung by a band)
- "In the Air Tonight" by Phil Collins (also used in the fourth-season episode "A Bullet for Crockett")
