= Bruce McGill =

American actor (born 1950)

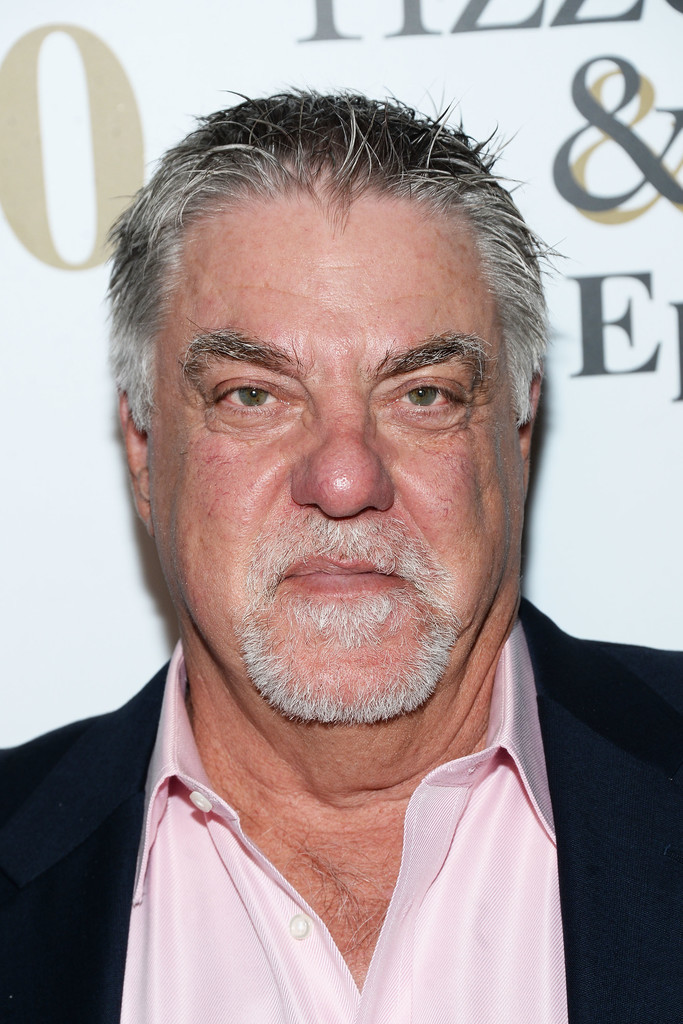
- McGill in 2014
- Born: Bruce Travis McGill; July 11, 1950 (age 76); San Antonio, Texas, U.S.
- Education: University of Texas at Austin (B.A., Drama)
- Occupation: Actor
- Years active: 1977–present
- Spouse: Gloria Lee (m. 1994)

Bruce Travis McGill (born July 11, 1950) is an American actor. He worked with director Michael Mann in the films The Insider (1999), Ali (2001), and Collateral (2004). McGill's other notable film roles include Daniel Simpson "D-Day" Day in John Landis's Animal House, and Sheriff Dean Farley in My Cousin Vinny.

McGill's television roles include Jack Dalton on MacGyver (1985–1992) and Det. Vince Korsak on Rizzoli & Isles (2010–2016). He also portrayed an older Captain Braxton in one episode of Star Trek: Voyager (1999) and voiced Lloyd Waterman, the owner of Waterman Cable, on The Cleveland Show (2009–2013). He played Ralph Houk in Billy Crystal's made-for-television film 61* (2001). In 2021, he had a recurring role in the NASCAR comedy series The Crew on Netflix.

== Early life ==
McGill was born in San Antonio, Texas, the son of Adriel "Squeaky" Rose (née Jacobs), an artist from San Antonio, and Woodrow Wilson McGill, a real estate and insurance agent. His mother was Jewish. He graduated from Douglas MacArthur High School in the northeastern part of San Antonio and from The University of Texas at Austin with a degree in drama. He is related to former Texas State Senator A. R. Schwartz.

== Career ==
=== Film ===
McGill has starred in many films, perhaps his most well-known role being "D-Day" in the 1978 comedy classic National Lampoon's Animal House, a role McGill was desperate to take at the time, recalling his days as a young unemployed actor sitting in a New York City casting office. In Animal House, he played the William Tell Overture by drumming his fingers on his windpipe. He duplicated this talent in MacGyver, playing "Rock-The-Cradle" to lull a child in his care to sleep.

McGill is a favorite of director Michael Mann, having worked with him on three of his films: 1999's The Insider, 2001's Ali and 2004's Collateral. He has also appeared in four HBO TV films, first playing Yankees manager Ralph Houk in Billy Crystal's film 61* in 2001, then diplomat George Ball in the 2002 film Path to War; journalist Peter Arnett in Live from Baghdad later that year; and most recently Mac Stipanovich in the 2008 film Recount about the 2000 Presidential election in Florida. He portrayed CIA Director George Tenet in Oliver Stone's film W. and, in 2012, Secretary of War Edwin M. Stanton in Steven Spielberg's Lincoln.

=== Television ===
McGill with Sasha Alexander, Janet Tamaro, and Angie Harmon in 2011

McGill reprised his role as D-Day from National Lampoon's Animal House in the short-lived 1979 ABC TV Spinoff Delta House. His other television guest appearances include Quantum Leap (in both the pilot and final episodes); Walker, Texas Ranger; CSI: Crime Scene Investigation; Crime Story; Miami Vice (featured in a 1985 episode widely considered by critics as the best episode of the series' run); and Star Trek: Voyager as Captain Braxton in the episode "Relativity". He was a recurring guest star in MacGyver as the title character's comical best friend, soldier of fortune/bush pilot Jack Dalton. Echoing that role, McGill often plays friends of the lead character in film and television. In 1994 he made a guest appearance with Jay Leno in the Emmy nominated TV series, Home Improvement. He played Willard Cates in the short-lived series Wolf Lake. He was scheduled to join the cast of Bionic Woman in the fall of 2007. He also voiced Agent Buford in the video game Mercenaries. In 2009, McGill appeared on Law & Order: Special Victims Unit as Gordon Garrison, a zealously bigoted anti-immigration talk-show host who, after sparking a mini-riot in court, sets up the acquittal of the killer. McGill also appeared on ABC's 2010 TV show, No Ordinary Family.

McGill also played Major Ed Ryan in the third season Babylon 5 episode "Severed Dreams" (which won the 1997 Hugo Award for Best Dramatic Presentation). Babylon 5 producer J. Michael Straczynski originally intended for Everett McGill to play the role. However he did not know McGill's first name, so when he asked to have McGill contacted, Straczynski was asked if he meant Bruce McGill, to which he replied yes. Even though it became apparent to Straczynski when Bruce McGill met him to discuss the role that he was not the McGill Straczynski had in mind, Straczynski decided to use him instead.

McGill also had a small role in a season 3 episode of Numb3rs as well as a season 3 episode of Psych.

McGill portrayed the character of veteran Boston Police Homicide Detective Vince Korsak on the TNT television crime drama, Rizzoli & Isles. The character of Korsak is the mentor and friend of Detective Jane Rizzoli, portrayed by Angie Harmon. Korsak saved Rizzoli's life from serial killer, Charles Hoyt. Korsak shot Hoyt's partner just before Hoyt was about to kill Rizzoli with a knife. In the episode "She Works Hard for the Money" (season 1 episode 4) Korsak is asked where he went to college. He responds "Didn't. Watched Animal House a few times."

McGill also had a recurring voice role on The Cleveland Show as Lloyd Waterman, the homosexual owner of Waterman Cable, where Cleveland Brown is employed as a cable installer.

In March, 2017, he guest starred as a decorated Vietnam War veteran in the television series NCIS.

McGill narrated the 2018 season of the Fox News documentary series Scandalous.

McGill is a skilled guitarist and played on set in season 4, episode 14, of Rizzoli & Isles.

== Filmography ==
=== Film ===
Year	Title	Role	Notes
1977	Handle with Care	"Blood"	
1978	F.I.S.T.	Hitman	Uncredited
1978	National Lampoon's Animal House	Daniel Simpson "D-Day" Day	
1981	The Hand	Brian Ferguson	
1982	The Ballad of Gregorio Cortez	Reporter Blakely	
1983	Silkwood	Mason "Mace" Hurley	
1985	Into the Night	Charlie	
1986	Wildcats	Dan Darwell	
1986	No Mercy	Lieutenant Hall	
1986	Club Paradise	Dave, Jack's Fireman Buddy	
1987	Waiting for the Moon	Ernest Hemingway	
1987	End of the Line	Billy Haney	
1987	The Secret of My Success	W. Shaw	Uncredited
1989	Three Fugitives	Charlie	
1989	Out Cold	Ernie	
1991	The Last Boy Scout	Mike Matthews	
1992	My Cousin Vinny	Sheriff Dean Farley	
1993	Cliffhanger	Treasury Agent	
1993	A Perfect World	Paul Saunders	
1994	Timecop	Director Eugene Matuzak	
1996	Black Sheep	Neuschwander	
1996	Courage Under Fire	McQuillan	
1997	Rosewood	Duke Purdy	
1997	Lawn Dogs	Nash	
1998	Letters from a Killer	Brinker	
1998	Ground Control	T.C. Bryant	
1999	The Insider	Ron Motley	
1999	A Dog of Flanders	William, The Blacksmith	
2000	Deep Core	Sam Dalton	
2000	The Legend of Bagger Vance	Walter Hagen	
2001	Exit Wounds	Frank Daniels	
2001	Shallow Hal	Reverend Larson	
2001	Ali	Agent Bradley	
2002	The Sum of All Fears	National Security Advisor Gene Revell	
2002	Path to War	George Ball	
2003	Legally Blonde 2: Red, White & Blonde	Stanford "Stan" Marks	
2003	Matchstick Men	Chuck Frechette	
2003	Runaway Jury	Judge Frederick Harkin	
2004	Collateral	FBI Agent Frank Pedrosa	
2005	Cinderella Man	James Johnston	
2005	Elizabethtown	Bill Banyon	
2005	Valley of the Heart's Delight	Horace Walsh	
2005	Slow Burn	Godfrey	
2006	Outlaw Trail: The Treasure of Butch Cassidy	Garrison	
2006	Behind Enemy Lines II: Axis of Evil	General Norman T. Vance	
2007	The Good Life	Frank Jones	
2007	The Lookout	Robert Pratt	
2008	Vantage Point	Phil McCullough	
2008	W.	George Tenet	
2009	Obsessed	Joe Gage	
2009	From Mexico with Love	Billy Jenks	
2009	The Perfect Game	Mr. Tanner	
2009	Law Abiding Citizen	District Attorney Jonas Cantrell	
2010	Fair Game	Jim Pavitt	
2011	Apart	Dr. Thomas Abner	
2012	Me Again	Earl "Big Earl"	
2012	Lincoln	Edwin Stanton	
2012	For Greater Glory	President Calvin Coolidge	
2012	FDR: American Badass!	Louis	
2012	Unconditional	Detective Miller	
2014	Ride Along	Lieutenant Brooks	
2015	Run All Night	Pat Mullen	
2016	Ride Along 2	Lieutenant Brooks	
2019	Waiting Game	Mel	Won for Best Actor at the Pasadena International Film Festival
2019	The Best of Enemies	Carvie Oldham	
2019	Poms	Chief Carl	
2020	The Big Ugly	Milt, Preston's Right-Hand Man	
2021	American Underdog	Jim Foster	
2021	Blue Miracle	Walter Bisbee	

=== Television ===
Year	Title	Role	Notes
1979	Delta House	Daniel Simpson "D-Day" Day	Spin-off of National Lampoon's Animal House
1981	A Whale for the Killing	Glenn	Television film
1985	Miami Vice	Hank Weldon	Episode: "Out Where the Buses Don't Run"
1986–1992	MacGyver	Jack Dalton	Recurring, 18 episodes
1986	As Summers Die	V.D. Skinner	Television film
1987	The Last Innocent Man	Burt Matson	Television film
1987	The Man Who Fell to Earth	Vernon Gage	Television film
1987	Crime Story	Nathan Hill	Episode: "Love Hurts"
1989	The Easter Story	(Video short) (voice)	
1989	Hardball	"Dutch"	Episode: "Time Bomb"
1989	Let's Get Mom	Bruce	Television film
1989	Quantum Leap	Ernie "Weird Ernie"	Episode: "Genesis" (Pilot)
1990	Goodnight Sweet Wife: A Murder in Boston	O'Meara	Television film
1990	The Flockens	Philip Flocken	Television film
1991	Davis Rules	Mike	2 episodes
1991	Shoot First: A Cop's Vengeance	Shifton	Television film
1991	The Perfect Tribute	Lamon	Television film
1991	Tales from the Crypt	Lou Paloma	Episode: "The Trap"
1992	A Thousand Heroes	Flight Engineer Dudley Dvorak	Television film
1993	Quantum Leap	Al, The Bartender	Episode: "Mirror Image" (series finale)
1993	Black Widow Murders: The Blanche Taylor Moore Story	Morgan	Television film
1993	Walker, Texas Ranger	Boone Waxwell	2 episodes
1995	Home Improvement	Doug O'Brien	Episode: "Brother, Can You Spare a Hot Rod?"
1995	Live Shot	Joe Vitale	13 episodes
1996	Tracey Takes On...	Michael Morris Daveen	Episode: "Law"
1996	Babylon 5	Major Ed Ryan	Episode: "Severed Dreams"
1998	Everything That Rises	Alan Jamison	Television film
1999	Tracey Takes On...	Richard Templeton	Episode: "Scandal"
1999	Star Trek: Voyager	Captain Braxton	Episode: "Relativity"
2000	Running Mates	Senator Mitchell Morris	Television film
2001	Inside the Osmonds	George Osmond	Television film
2001	61*	Ralph Houk	Television film
2001	The Ballad of Lucy Whipple	Jonas Scatter	Television film
2002	Path to War	George Ball	Television film
2002	Live from Baghdad	Peter Arnett	Television film
2002	The Practice	Judge Charles Fleming	Episode "Judge Knot"
2002	CSI: Crime Scene Investigation	Jimmy Tadero	Episode "Felonious Monk" (S2E17)
2003	Justice League	General McCormick	Voice, episode: "Eclipsed"
2007	Numb3rs	Austin	Episode: "Contenders"
2008	Recount	Mac Stipanovich	Television film
2009	Psych	Fire Chief Dan Trombly	Episode: "Earth, Wind and... Wait for It"
2009	Law & Order: Special Victims Unit	Gordon Garrison	Episode: "Anchor"
2009–2013	The Cleveland Show	Lloyd Waterman	Voice, recurring role
2010–2016	Rizzoli & Isles	Detective Vince Korsak	Main cast
2010	No Ordinary Family	Allan Crane	Episode: "No Ordinary Visitors"
2010–2011	Family Guy	Santa Claus, John Williams	Voice, 2 episodes
2012	The Good Wife	Jeremy Breslow	Episode: "A Defense of Marriage"
2012–2013	Ben and Kate	Randy Fox	2 episodes
2013	The Ultimate Guide to the Presidents	The Narrator	Miniseries
2016	Blue Bloods	Rick "Big Rick" Wolf	Episode: "Unbearable Loss"
2017	NCIS	Henry Rogers	Episode: "The Wall"
2017	MacGyver	Detective Greer	Episode: "Bullet & Pen"
2018	Suits	Stanley Gordon	Recurring role; Season 7
2018	Scandalous	The Narrator	
2018	Shades of Blue	Jordan Ramsey	Recurring role; 9 episodes
2019	High & Tight	Jerry McMillan	Television film
2019	The I-Land	Warden Wells	Miniseries
2021	The Crew	Bobby Spencer	Recurring role; 4 episodes
2022	Reacher	Mayor Grover Teale	Recurring; Season 1
2022	Buried in Barstow	Von	Television film
2023	Love & Death	Judge Tom Ryan	Miniseries
2027	Scooby-Doo: Origins	TBA	Filming

== Awards and nominations ==
Year	Nominated work	Award	Category	Result
2013	Lincoln	Gold Derby Awards	Ensemble Cast	Nominated
2019	Waiting Game	Pasadena International Film Festival	Best Actor	Won
