= Ricardo Tubbs =

Miami Vice fictional character

- Miami Vice character
- Philip Michael Thomas as Rico Tubbs
- First appearance: "Brother's Keeper"
- Portrayed by: Philip Michael Thomas (series); Jamie Foxx (2006 film); Michael B. Jordan (2028 film)

In-universe information
- Aliases: "Richard Taylor" "Rico Cooper"
- Nickname: Rico
- Occupation: Metro-Dade Detective Sergeant
- Family: Rafael Tubbs (brother, deceased); Ricardo Tubbs Jr. (son)
- Affiliated with: James "Sonny" Crockett

Detective Ricardo "Rico" Tubbs is a fictional character from the Miami Vice television series. Tubbs was originally portrayed by Philip Michael Thomas in the television series from 1984 to 1990, later by Jamie Foxx in the feature film in 2006 and Michael B. Jordan in the upcoming 2028 film. Tubbs is an undercover detective for the Metro-Dade Police Department's Organized Crime Bureau, having relocated to Miami from New York City in order to track down his brother's murderer. For the duration of the series, Tubbs is partnered with fellow undercover detective James "Sonny" Crockett.

Tubbs made his first appearance in the show's pilot episode, "Brother's Keeper", and later went on to appear in all but one of the show's 114 episodes. Thomas' portrayal of Tubbs was well received by fans and critics, and earned him a People's Choice Award and a Golden Globe Award nomination. Tubbs would go on to become a fashion icon, and helped to set a trend for Miami Vice-related clothing.

== Fictional character biography ==
=== Television series ===
Before coming to Miami, Tubbs was a detective in the Armed Robbery Division of the New York Police Department, along with his older brother Rafael who was a senior detective in the Narcotics Division. At various times during his stint in New York, Tubbs was partnered with detectives Valerie Gordon (Pam Grier) and Clarence Batisse (Victor Love) Tubbs and Gordon were romantically involved, and would sporadically resume their affair throughout the series. Tubbs' relationship with Batisse, however, was much more volatile—after a suspicious shooting during a routine bust, Tubbs' testimony to Internal Affairs resulted in Batisse's dismissal. Batisse would, however, eventually be exonerated thanks to Tubbs' aid.

Rafael's murder at the hands of drug lord Esteban Calderone (Miguel Piñero) led Tubbs to Miami, where he eventually teamed up with the Metro-Dade Organized Crime Bureau. Calderone was apprehended, but managed to bribe a judge to escape custody. Later, when trying to track the drug lord again, Tubbs sleeps with Angelina Madeira (Phanie Napoli), Calderone's daughter. Upon confronting the drug lord, Crockett and Tubbs are caught in a shoot-out, which ends when Crockett shoots Calderone dead. Several months later, Angelina surfaces again, having had a child as a result of her fling with Tubbs. However, her brother Orlando (John Leguizamo) has also located Tubbs, wanting revenge for his father's death. Tubbs' son, Ricardo Jr, is kidnapped, and Angelina killed, before Orlando escapes. Orlando reappears after luring Tubbs to a remote Caribbean island, hoping to trap and kill him. Tubbs is able to evade Orlando's gang, however, and escapes after killing his pursuer in a shoot-out.

In stark contrast to Crockett, who drives expensive Ferraris and carries high-tech handguns as part of his cover, Tubbs exudes a more tough, street-smart New Yorker image, driving a metallic blue 1964 Cadillac de Ville convertible, and carrying cheaper, more readily available weapons, his primary weapon being a snubnosed Smith & Wesson Bodyguard revolver, and as a secondary weapon, he carried a sawed-off side by side shotgun during Season 1 and later an Ithaca 37 "Stakeout" shotgun with shortened barrel and forward pistol grip.

Compared to his partner, Tubbs' cool demeanor helps him avoid much of the burnout Crockett would experience after the killing of his wife Caitlin and his brief amnesia. However, getting rejected by Valerie after proposing marriage eventually takes a toll on Tubbs too, and coupled with him and Crockett feeling disappointed in how they were treated by the government regarding their involvement in the case of protecting Costa Morada dictator Manuel Borbon, Tubbs and Crockett end up resigning from the force. He then meets up with Crockett one last time, and Crockett offers him a ride to the airport in his "stolen" Ferrari, as Tubbs decides to head "back up to the big bad Bronx".

Tubbs is bilingual in English and Spanish.

=== Film ===
In the 2006 film adaptation of Miami Vice, Ricardo Tubbs is portrayed by Jamie Foxx and is in a relationship with fellow Vice Detective Trudy Joplin, who is portrayed by Naomie Harris. Tubbs' past is not revealed in the film. He is shown to be urbane, level-headed and a smooth-talker like the television version, but with the additions of being more gritty, world weary, and a skilled pilot.

== Production ==
Tubbs, along with his partner Crockett, have been cited as being influenced by the characters of David Starsky and Kenneth Hutchinson from the 1970s series Starsky & Hutch, several episodes of which were written by Miami Vice producers Michael Mann and Anthony Yerkovich; and the duo of Bobby Hill and Andy Renko from Hill Street Blues. The film 48 Hrs. has also been seen as an influence on the characters. Tubbs represents a "neo-populist sneering at the worlds of finance and politics", his New York back-story helping to convey "a sociological explanation of crime".

Mann originally conceived the character of Ricardo Tubbs as "nobody's Tonto", claiming that this is what drove the character for most of the first season. However, he felt that "for reasons that had to do with the two actors and one thing or the other, that eroded a little bit" over the course of the series. Jodie Tillen, the show's costume designer, described the character as being "formal" and "self-conscious" of his image, contrasting with the "beach bum" look of the character of Crockett. Thomas has also described Tubbs as being "sharp as a tack".

== Themes ==
Beyond his role as the "cynical, worldly", even "skeptical" outsider, Tubbs has been seen as exemplifying the lure of the very things his job pits him against. Writing about the character's development over the first few seasons, James Lyons describes Tubbs as being "rather enchanted" by the thrills of his undercover work, noting his off-duty relationships with suspects and other individuals related to his cases in episodes such as "Evan", "The Great McCarthy" and the two-part "Calderone's Return". Lyons feels that this arc ends in the latter half of the second season, sensing that Tubbs' "weariness" and sense of loss begin to set in after witnessing the suicide of a prostitute he had tried to rescue in the episode "Little Miss Dangerous", and both the apparent death of his infant son and the actual death of the child's mother in the episode "Sons and Lovers". David Buxton reinforces this view, noting that, in the series, "the line between normality and vice, between 'good' and 'bad'... is so blurred as to be non-existent at times"; whilst Arthur Kean Spears' Race and Ideology: Language, Symbolism, and Popular Culture claims that "what Tubbs seems to lack in actual Miami vice experience, his life experience makes up for".

== Reception ==
The New York Times has called the character "dissolute but human, gritty but glamorous", noting that two decades after the show's end, "Tubbs still look[s] very cool". Time magazine called Thomas' casting "inspired", noting that his easy-going nature provided a "sharp contrast" to Johnson's Crockett. The National Review echoed this sentiment, noting that "Tubbs, for example, seemed so much happier than the perennially haunted Crockett ... but there was never any question about the bond they shared". Turner Classic Movies have noted Thomas' "unique" and "engaging" portrayal of the role, stating that "his popularity crossed gender and racial lines", making "an indelible mark, " on viewers. New York Magazine, however, simply noted the character as "an acceptable Sidney Poitier facsimile". Tubbs, along with Crockett, was named as one of Entertainment Weekly's "25 Terrific TV Detectives" in 2009.

When the first season of Miami Vice became a "breakthrough hit", the "smooth and swinging" character of Tubbs became a style icon—Bloomingdale's reported "noticeable" rises in the sales of blazers and jackets; whilst Kenneth Cole brought out "Crockett" and "Tubbs" shoes, and Macy's opened a "Miami Vice" young men's section The National Review's Andrew Stuttford has described the impact of the character's style as an "escape from the monotone restraints of conventional detective drama", noting that its influence "transformed notions of what television could do". The character of Tubbs has also been referenced and parodied in popular culture. The Sesame Street "Miami Mice" segment featured the character Tito, who was modelled on Tubbs. The character is also referenced in episodes of The Sopranos, Family Guy, K-Ville, The Fresh Prince of Bel-Air, as well as the 2007 film Hot Fuzz.

Thomas' portrayal of Tubbs earned the actor several award nominations. In 1986, he and Johnson shared a People's Choice Award for their work on the show, whilst in that same year he was also nominated for a Golden Globe Award for Best Performance by an Actor in a Television Series - Drama, although he did not win.
