= Miami Vice =

American crime drama television series (1984–1990)

- Three-color variation of the series' logo
- Genre: Action; Crime drama; Neo-noir; Mystery thriller
- Created by: Anthony Yerkovich
- Starring: Don Johnson; Philip Michael Thomas; Saundra Santiago; Michael Talbott; John Diehl; Olivia Brown; Gregory Sierra; Edward James Olmos
- Theme music composer: Jan Hammer
- Opening theme: "Miami Vice Theme"
- Ending theme: "Miami Vice Theme"
- Composers: Jan Hammer (seasons 1–4); Tim Truman (season 5)
- Country of origin: United States
- Original language: English
- No. of seasons: 5
- No. of episodes: 114 (list of episodes)

Production
- Executive producers: Michael Mann; Anthony Yerkovich (season 1)
- Producer: John Nicolella (seasons 1–2)
- Running time: 46–49 minutes, plus three 96-minute episodes (excluding commercials)
- Production companies: Michael Mann Productions; Universal Television

Original release
- Network: NBC
- Release: September 16, 1984 – January 25, 1990

Miami Vice is an American crime drama television series created by Anthony Yerkovich and executive-produced by Michael Mann for NBC. It stars Don Johnson as James "Sonny" Crockett and Philip Michael Thomas as Ricardo "Rico" Tubbs, two Metro-Dade Police Department detectives working undercover in Miami, Florida. The series ran for five seasons on NBC from September 16, 1984, to June 28, 1989, airing on Friday nights.

Unlike traditional police procedurals, Miami Vice drew upon 1980s culture such as contemporary rock and pop music, fashion, and sports cars (such as the Ferrari Testarossa and Lamborghini Countach). Although the series explored a number of different approaches during its five-year run, it generally prioritized music and stylized visuals over elaborate writing.

USA Network began airing reruns of the series on cable in 1988. The series heavily inspired the 2002 video game Grand Theft Auto: Vice City. Mann directed a film adaptation, released in 2006. Another film adaptation, titled Miami Vice '85, was announced in 2025 to be directed by Joseph Kosinski and written by Dan Gilroy.

== Conception ==
The conception of the show is unclear. One version of events states that the head of NBC's Entertainment Division, Brandon Tartikoff, wrote a brainstorming memo that simply read "MTV cops", and later presented it to series creator Anthony Yerkovich, formerly a writer and producer for Hill Street Blues. Yerkovich, however, disputes that story. Film critic Matt Seitz quotes Yerkovich as saying, "Brandon didn't start telling people that ridiculous story of writing 'MTV cops' on a napkin until at least 14 months after the pitch meeting." Yerkovich said he devised the concept after learning about asset forfeiture statutes allowing law enforcement agencies to confiscate the property of drug dealers for official use. The initial idea was for a movie about a pair of vice cops in Miami. With the backing of Kerry McCluggage, senior vice-president of creative affairs for Universal Television, and MCA/Universal president Robert Harris, Yerkovich sold the project to NBC as a weekly drama in 1983 and began writing a pilot script. The two-hour pilot, originally titled Gold Coast, was renamed Miami Vice. Yerkovich was immediately drawn to South Florida as a setting for his new-style police show.

== Production ==
In keeping with the show's title, most episodes focus on combating drug trafficking and prostitution. Episodes often end in an intense gun battle, claiming the lives of several criminals before they can be apprehended. An undercurrent of cynicism and futility underlies the entire series. The detectives repeatedly refer to the "Whac-A-Mole" nature of drug interdiction, with its parade of drug cartels quickly replacing those that are apprehended. Co-executive producer Yerkovich explained:

Even when I was on Hill Street Blues, I was collecting information on Miami, I thought of it as a sort of a modern-day American Casablanca. It seemed to be an interesting socio-economic tide pool: the incredible number of refugees from Central America and Cuba, the already extensive Cuban-American community, and on top of all that the drug trade. There is a fascinating amount of service industries that revolve around the drug trade—money laundering, bail bondsmen, attorneys who service drug smugglers. Miami has become a sort of Barbary Coast of free enterprise gone berserk.

One of the show's directors, Lee H. Katzin, stated that "The show is written for an MTV audience, which is more interested in images, emotions and energy than plot and character and words." These elements helped make the series an instant hit. Its first season saw an unprecedented 15 Emmy Award nominations. While the first few episodes contain elements of a standard police procedural, the producers soon abandoned them in favor of a more distinctive style. Influenced by an Art Deco revival, no "earth tones" were allowed to be used in the production by executive producer Michael Mann. A director of Miami Vice, Bobby Roth, recalled:

There are certain colors you are not allowed to shoot, such as red and brown. If the script says "A Mercedes pulls up here," the car people will show you three or four different Mercedes. One will be white, one will be black, one will be silver. You will not get a red or brown one. Michael knows how things are going to look on camera.

Miami Vice was one of the first American network television programs to be broadcast in stereophonic sound. It is mixed in stereo for its entire run. Each episode of the series cost $2 million.

=== Casting ===
Nick Nolte and Jeff Bridges were considered for the role of Sonny Crockett, but since it was not lucrative for film stars to venture into television at the time, other candidates were considered. Mickey Rourke was also considered for the role, but he turned down the offer. Larry Wilcox, of CHiPs, was also a candidate for the role of Crockett, but the producers felt going from one police officer role to another would not be a good fit. After dozens of candidates and a twice-delayed pilot shooting, Don Johnson and Philip Michael Thomas were chosen as the vice cops. For Johnson, who was by then 34 years old, NBC had particular doubts about the several earlier unsuccessful pilots in which he starred. But Yerkovich was convinced about Don Johnson being the right person for the role. He asked to read the scripts of Johnson's work on those failed shows. He reported back that the scripts were the problem, not the actor, and NBC acquiesced. Jimmy Smits played Eddie Rivera, Crockett's ill-fated partner, in the pilot episode. Crockett's supervisor in the early episodes, Lt. Lou Rodriguez, was played by veteran police drama actor Gregory Sierra. He was written out of the series in the two-part episode Calderone's Return after Sierra decided he didn't like being in Miami. His replacement, Edward James Olmos as Lt. Martin Castillo, stayed on for the remainder of the series.

After two seasons, Don Johnson threatened to walk from the series as part of a highly publicized contract dispute. The network was ready to replace him with Mark Harmon, who had recently departed St. Elsewhere, but the network and Johnson were able to resolve their differences and he continued with the series until its end.

=== Locations ===
Despite the Miami setting, the producers initially planned to film the series in Los Angeles. However, by the time production began, the decision had been made to shoot in Miami itself. Many episodes of Miami Vice were filmed in the South Beach section of Miami Beach, an area which, at the time, was blighted by poverty and crime, with its demographic so deteriorated that there "simply weren't many people on the street. Ocean Drive's hotels were filled with elderly, mostly Jewish retirees, many of them frail, subsisting on meager Social Security payments. ... They were filming all over Miami Beach. ... They could film in the middle of the street. There was literally nobody there. There were no cars parked in the street". In early episodes in particular, local elderly residents were frequently cast as extras.

Some street corners of South Beach were so run down that the production crew actually decided to repaint the exterior walls of some buildings before filming. The crew went to great lengths to find the correct settings and props. Bobby Roth recalled, "I found this house that was really perfect, but the color was sort of beige. The art department instantly paints the house gray for me. Even on feature films people try to deliver what is necessary but no more. At Miami Vice they start with what's necessary and go beyond it."

Miami Vice is to some degree credited with causing a wave of support for the preservation of Miami's famous Art Deco architecture in the mid-1980s to early 1990s; and many of those buildings, among them many beachfront hotels, have been renovated since filming, making that part of South Beach one of South Florida's most popular places for tourists and celebrities.

Other places commonly filmed in the series include locations around Broward and Palm Beach counties.

Interior scenes were initially supposed to be filmed at Universal Studios in Los Angeles, but to simplify cross-country logistics, the decision was made to use the facilities of Greenwich Studios in North Miami instead, and only carry out post-production in Los Angeles. In a few scenes, particularly in earlier episodes, Greenwich Studios' rear loading dock is repeatedly used as the back room of the Gold Coast Shipping building, where the offices of the vice squad are located.

=== Music ===
Miami Vice is noted for its innovative use of stereo broadcast music, particularly rock and pop hits of the 1980s, and the distinctive, synthesized instrumental music of Jan Hammer. While other television shows used made-for-TV music, Miami Vice would spend $10,000 or more per episode to buy the rights to original recordings. Getting a song played on Miami Vice was a boost to record labels and artists. Some newspapers, such as USA Today, would let readers know the songs that would be featured each week. Among the many well-known bands and artists, as well as underground or 'new wave' associated acts, who contributed their music to the show were:

- The Alan Parsons Project
- Bryan Adams
- Russ Ballard
- Black Uhuru
- Jackson Browne
- Kate Bush
- The Church
- Eric Clapton
- Phil Collins
- Roger Daltrey
- The Damned
- El DeBarge
- Depeche Mode
- Devo
- Dire Straits
- Duran Duran
- Foreigner
- Frankie Goes to Hollywood
- Glenn Frey
- Peter Gabriel
- Godley & Creme
- Corey Hart
- The Hooters
- Billy Idol
- Iron Maiden
- Meat Loaf
- Ted Nugent
- Sinéad O'Connor
- Billy Ocean
- Pink Floyd
- The Police
- The Power Station
- Propaganda
- Public Image Limited
- Red 7
- The Smiths
- Suicidal Tendencies
- Pete Townshend
- The Tubes
- Tina Turner
- U2
- Underworld
- The Ward Brothers
- ZZ Top

Several artists guest-star in episodes, including Leonard Cohen, Phil Collins, Miles Davis, the Power Station, Glenn Frey, Suicidal Tendencies, Willie Nelson, Ted Nugent, Frank Zappa, the Fat Boys, Sheena Easton, Gloria Estefan, and Gene Simmons. An iconic scene from the Miami Vice oeuvre involves Crockett and Tubbs driving through Miami at night to Phil Collins' song "In the Air Tonight".

Jan Hammer credits executive producer Michael Mann with allowing him great creative freedom in scoring Miami Vice. Hammer later recalled in interviews that Michael Mann told him that as soon as the show's production would start, Mann wanted him to "run with it". The collaboration resulted in memorable instrumental pieces, including the show's title theme, which climbed to the top of the Billboard charts in November 1985.

The Miami Vice original soundtrack, featuring the theme song and Glenn Frey's "Smuggler's Blues" and "You Belong to the City" (a No. 2 hit), remained at the top of the United States album chart for 11 weeks in 1985, making it the most successful TV soundtrack at the time. The theme song was so popular that it also garnered two Grammy Awards in 1986. It was also voted the number-one theme song of all time by TV Guide readers. "Crockett's Theme", another recurring tune from the show, became a No. 1 hit in several European countries in 1987.

During the show's run, three official soundtrack albums with original music from the episodes were released. Hammer also released several albums with music from the series; among them are Escape from Television (1987), Snapshots (1989), and after many requests from fans, Miami Vice: The Complete Collection (2002).

=== Fashion ===
Don Johnson epitomizing the dress style that became a hallmark of the series

The clothes worn on Miami Vice had a significant influence on men's fashion. They popularized, if not invented, the "T-shirt under Armani jacket"–style, and popularized Italian men's fashion in the U.S. Don Johnson's typical attire of Italian sport coat, T-shirt, white linen pants, and slip-on sockless loafers became a hit. Crockett initially wore an 18k Rolex Day-Date "President" model in the first season, until Ebel won the contract for the remaining seasons. Similarly, Crockett's perpetually unshaven appearance sparked a minor fashion trend, inspiring men to wear designer stubble at all times. In an average episode, Crockett and Tubbs wore five to eight outfits, appearing in shades of pink, blue, green, peach, fuchsia, and the show's other "approved" colors. Designers such as Vittorio Ricci, Gianni Versace, and Hugo Boss were consulted in keeping the male leads looking trendy. Costume designer Bambi Breakstone, who traveled to Milan, Paris, and London in search of new clothes, said that, "The concept of the show is to be on top of all the latest fashion trends in Europe." Jodi Tillen, the costume designer for the first season, along with Michael Mann, set the style. The abundance of pastel colors on the show reflects Miami's Art-deco architecture.

During its five-year run, consumer demand for unstructured blazers, shiny fabric jackets, and lighter pastels increased. After Six formal wear even created a line of Miami Vice dinner jackets, Kenneth Cole introduced Crockett and Tubbs shoes, and Macy's opened a Miami Vice section in its young men's department. Crockett also boosted Ray Ban's popularity by wearing a pair of Model L2052, Ray-Ban Wayfarers, which increased sales of Ray Bans to 720,000 units in 1984. In the spring of 1986, an electric razor became available named the "Stubble Device", allowing users to have a beard like Don Johnson's character. It was initially named the "Miami Device" by Wahl, but in the end the company opted to avoid a trademark infringement lawsuit. Many of the styles popularized by the TV show, such as the T-shirt under pastel suits, no socks, rolled up sleeves, and Ray-Ban sunglasses, have become the standard image of 1980s culture. The influence of Miami Vice's fashions continued into the early 1990s and, to some extent, has had a lasting impact.

=== Firearms ===
Miami Vice also popularized certain brands of firearms and accessories. After Johnson became dissatisfied with his gun holster, the Jackass Leather Company (later renamed Galco International) sent their president, Rick Gallagher, to personally fit Don Johnson with an "Original Jackass Rig", later renamed the Galco "Miami Classic".

The Bren Ten, manufactured by Dornaus & Dixon, was a stainless steel handgun used by Don Johnson during Miami Vice's first two seasons. Dornaus & Dixon went out of business in 1986, and Smith & Wesson was offered a contract to outfit Johnson's character with a S&W Model 645 during season three.

Several firearms never before seen on TV were featured prominently for the first time in the show, including the Glock 17 pistol. In addition, firearms not yet well known to the public, including the Steyr AUG, and the MAC-10, were showcased to a wide audience on this show. Even heavy guns came to use, as Zito is seen maneuvering an M60 machine gun from a rooftop in the episode "Lombard".

=== Cars ===
Two automobiles drew a lot of attention in Miami Vice, the Ferrari Daytona and Testarossa. During the first two seasons and two episodes of the third season, Detective Sonny Crockett drove a black 1972 Ferrari Daytona Spyder 365 GTS/4 kit replica built on a Chevrolet Corvette C3 chassis. The car was fitted with Ferrari-shaped body panels by specialty car manufacturer McBurnie Coachcraft. Once the car gained notoriety, Ferrari Automobili filed suit demanding that McBurnie and any others cease and desist producing and selling Ferrari replicas and infringing upon the Ferrari name and styling. As a result, the Daytona lasted until season 2, at which point it was "blown up" in the season three premiere episode, "When Irish Eyes Are Crying". Neither the kit car nor its backup were actually destroyed, as the production company simply blew up a small, plastic model for both cost and safety reasons. The fake Ferraris were removed from the show, with Ferrari donating two brand new 1986 Testarossas as replacements. The Ferrari Daytona is the subject of a huge continuity error on the show, when it suddenly reappears in "El Viejo", six episodes after its destruction, without explanation. Originally "El Viejo" was set to be the third season premiere, but studio executives felt the Daytona's destruction would serve as a more dramatic opening to the season. Don Johnson's contract holdout at the start of the season also played a part, delaying filming to the point where "El Viejo" could not finish in time for the season premiere.

The series' crew also used a third Testarossa lookalike, which was the stunt car. Carl Roberts, who had worked on the Daytona kit cars, offered to build the stunt car. Roberts decided to use a 1972 De Tomaso Pantera, which had the same wheelbase and similar frame proportions as the Testarossa and thus was perfect for the body pieces. The vehicle was modified to withstand daily usage on set, and continued to be driven until the series ended.

Crockett was also seen driving a black 1978 Porsche 911 SC Targa in a flashback to 1980 in the Season 3 episode "Forgive Us Our Debts."

Crockett's partner, Ricardo Tubbs, drove a 1964 Cadillac Coupe de Ville Convertible. Stan Switek drove a turquoise 1961 Ford Thunderbird. Gina Calabrese drove a 1971 Mercury Cougar XR-7 convertible. When Stan and Larry were undercover, they drove a Dodge Ram Van. Other notable vehicles that appear in Miami Vice include Lamborghinis, AMG Mercedes-Benzes, BMWs, Maseratis, Lotuses, DeLoreans, Porsches, and Corvettes. American muscle cars, such as the Pontiac GTO and Firebird Trans Am, Ford Mustang, Chevrolet Camaro, Plymouth GTX and Barracuda, Chevrolet Monte Carlo SS, and the Buick Grand National also made appearances.

=== Boats and seaplanes ===
Throughout the series, Sonny Crockett lived on an Endeavour sailboat, St. Vitus' Dance, while in the pilot episode, Crockett is seen on a 38-foot Cabo Rico sailboat. In season 1, he is seen living on an Endeavour 40 sailboat, while in the rest of the series (seasons 2 to 5) he is seen living on an Endeavour 42 sailboat (priced at $120,000 in 1986). The allure of the sailboats was such that the Endeavour 42 used for the 1986 season of Miami Vice was sold to a midwest couple, while the Endeavour 40, was sold to a chartering service in Fort Lauderdale. At the same time, Endeavour was building a new 42 for the 1987 season of Miami Vice.

In the pilot episode, and for the first season, Crockett piloted a Chris-Craft Stinger 390 X – a 39-foot deep-v offshore racing boat. For the other four Stingers, Chris-Craft showed the production crew a color scheme that included the red – however, since Michael Mann decided that the color red was to never show up on the show, a blue color scheme was chosen instead. The Stingers used on the show were not free from Chris-Craft. This situation caused the production team to switch to using Wellcraft 38 Scarab KVs for the remainder of the show. The Scarab 38 KVs were a 28-hued, twin 440-hp boat that sold for $130,000 in 1986.

As a result of the attention the Scarab 38 KV garnered on Miami Vice, Wellcraft received "an onslaught of orders", increasing sales by 21% in one year. In appreciation, Wellcraft gave Don Johnson an exact duplicate of the boat. Afterward, Johnson was frequently seen arriving to work in it. Altogether, 100 copies of the boat, dubbed the Scarab 38KV Miami Vice Edition, were built by Wellcraft. The Miami Vice graphics and color scheme, which include turquoise, aqua, and orchid, was available by special order on any model Scarab from 20 to 38 feet.

Don Johnson also participated in the design of the Scarab Excel 43 ft, Don Johnson Signature Series (DJSS), and raced a similar one. The DJSS was powered by twin 650-hp Lamborghini V-12 engines, which caused some problems to the design of the boat due to their size. Overall the boat cost $300,000 with each engine amounting to between $60–$70,000. His interest in boat racing eventually led Johnson to start his own offshore powerboat racing team, named Team USA. Joining him were Hollywood stars including Kurt Russell and Chuck Norris. Johnson won the Offshore World Cup in 1988 and continued racing into the 1990s.

In the show's opening credits, along with both the pilot episode, "Brother's Keeper", and the season 4 episode, "Baseballs of Death", a Grumman Turbo Mallard (G-73T) amphibious airplane (registration # N2969), operated by Chalk's International Airlines made appearances. In the pilot episode, the drug dealer Calderone used N2969 to successfully escape from Crockett and Tubbs at the climax of the episode. In the latter episode, Guerrero made an attempt to escape from the vice team in N2969 but ran out of fuel and was killed after he stole a fisherman's boat which then ran ashore and exploded. In December 2005, N2969 suffered a catastrophic structural failure when the right wing separated from the fuselage as the plane climbed out of Miami bound for the Bahamas. Both crew members and all 18 passengers were killed upon impact with the water.

== Episodes ==
| Season | Episodes | Originally released | |
| Season | Episodes | First released | Last released |
|---|---|---|---|
| 1 | 23 | September 16, 1984 | May 10, 1985 |
| 2 | 23 | September 27, 1985 | May 9, 1986 |
| 3 | 24 | September 26, 1986 | May 8, 1987 |
| 4 | 22 | September 25, 1987 | May 6, 1988 |
| 5 | 22 | November 4, 1988 | January 25, 1990 |

=== Overview ===
Scripts were loosely based on actual crimes that occurred in Miami over the years. This included both local and global organized crime. Many episodes focused on drug trafficking (for which real-life Miami was a main hub and entrance point into North America in the early 1980s). Other episodes were based on crimes such as firearms trafficking, for which Miami was equally a gateway for sales to Latin America, as well as the Miami River Cops scandal (a real police corruption ring that involved narcotic thefts, drug dealing and murders), street prostitution, serial home burglaries, crimes committed by Cuban immigrants to Miami following the Mariel boatlift, and yakuza and Mafia activity in Miami. The series also took a look at political issues such as the Northern Ireland conflict, the drug war in South America (e.g. "Prodigal Son"), U.S. support of generals and dictators in Southeast Asia and South America, and the aftermath of the Vietnam War. Social issues like child abuse, homophobia, and the AIDS crisis were also covered.

Personal issues also arose: Crockett separated from his wife Caroline (Belinda Montgomery) in the pilot and divorced in the fourth episode, and later his second wife Caitlin Davies (Sheena Easton) was killed by one of his enemies. In the three episodes "Mirror Image", "Hostile Takeover", and "Redemption in Blood", a concussion caused by an explosion caused Crockett to believe he was his undercover alter ego Sonny Burnett, a drug dealer. Tubbs had a running, partly personal vendetta with the Calderone family, a member of which ordered the death of his brother Rafael, a New York City Police detective. Lieutenant Martin Castillo is also frequently haunted by his past in Southeast Asia, which he had spent as a DEA agent in the Golden Triangle.

In the first seasons the tone was lighter, especially when comical characters such as police informants Noogie Lamont (Charlie Barnett) and Izzy Moreno (Martin Ferrero) appeared. Later the content was darker and cynical, with Crockett and Tubbs fighting corruption, and storylines emphasizing the aspect of human tragedy behind a crime. The darker episodes sometimes lacked a denouement, each episode ending abruptly after a climax involving violence and death, often giving the episodes a despairing and sometimes nihilistic feel, despite the trademark glamour and conspicuous wealth.

Given its idiosyncratic "dark" feel and touch, Miami Vice is frequently cited as an example of made-for-TV neo-noir. Michael Mann, who serves as executive producer for the majority of the show's five-year run, is often credited with being one of the most influential neo-noir directors. The second-season episode "Out Where the Buses Don't Run" ranks #90 on TV Guide's 100 Greatest Episodes of All Time list.

=== Changes ===
During its five-year run, Miami Vice underwent several noticeable changes in its formula and content. Between seasons one and two, however, these changes were mostly subtle and involved details such as the degree of perfection with which color shades of scene backdrops, props and clothing are matched to each other.

For its third season in 1986–87 after the cancellation of Knight Rider, the show moved from its traditional time slot of 10 pm on Friday nights to 9 pm, which now put it up against perennial Top 10 show Dallas. This began the show's decline, and in March, 1987, TV Guide ran a cover story entitled, "Dallas Drubs the Cops: Why Miami Vice Seems to be Slipping". Miami Vice's season ratings slipped from #9 in Season 2 down to #27 by the end of Season 3.

Before leaving the series to work on his new television series, Crime Story, Michael Mann handed the role of executive producer to future Law & Order creator Dick Wolf prior to the third season (1986–1987). Wolf had the show focus on contemporary issues like the Troubles in Northern Ireland and capital punishment.

In addition to losing the battle against new timeslot rival Dallas, the general tone of season 3 episodes started to become more serious and less lighthearted than in previous seasons. Comedic scenes and subplots became distinctly rare. True to Dick Wolf's "grabbed from the headlines" approach which he later employed in TV series like Law & Order, storylines focused more on the serious human aspect of crime than on glamorizing the tropical lifestyles of drug dealers and other high-profile criminals. Additionally, while season 1 and 2 had featured occasional episodes with commentary on wider, sometimes global political issues such as the Vietnam War, U.S. banks' involvement in cocaine production, or CIA operations abroad, it became much more of a theme in season 3, with episodes dealing with the Northern Ireland conflict, international child trafficking, or privately funded military operations in Central America. This shift in tone also reflected in the series' fashions, color schemes, and its choice of music. The cast started wearing pronouncedly dark clothing and even earthtones, which had famously been avoided by executive producer Michael Mann in seasons one and two. Color palettes of scene backdrops started becoming much darker as well, with pastels replaced by harsher-appearing shades of neon. Whereas seasons one and two always featured a diverse selection of contemporary, mostly "upbeat" chart music and classic rock and pop, the third season's music lineup became much more somber, with songs like "In Dulce Decorum" by The Damned, "Lives in the Balance" by Jackson Browne, "Mercy" by Steve Jones, and "Never Let Me Down Again (Aggro Mix)" by Depeche Mode. All these changes were decidedly unwelcome, both by critics and by many viewers who had become fans of the TV series, due to the package that the first two seasons delivered. It caused the producers to retool their approach to Miami Vice for the following fourth season.

By Season 4, most of the original writers had left the series. Stories and story arcs included a courtship and marriage between Sonny Crockett (Don Johnson) and Caitlin Davies (Sheena Easton), and a plot in which Crockett developed amnesia, during which he mistook himself for his drug dealer alter ego and became a hitman. Caroline Crockett, Sonny's first wife, as well as his son Billy reappeared briefly.

Jan Hammer departed from the series at the end of the fourth season, having already handed much of the weekly scoring workload during the season over to John Petersen. The tone of many season 4 episodes grew lighter again, albeit sometimes veering off into the bizarre, e.g. episodes like "The Big Thaw", "Missing Hours", and "The Cows of October", marking an increasing trend of inconsistent episode script quality, which would continue all the way to the end of season 5. Fashions and scene backdrops increasingly reassumed the pastel hues of seasons 1 and 2, which was seen by critics as an acknowledgement by the producers that season 3's earthtones were a mistake, and the choice of music became more varied again. Hopes by the producers of propitiating former and remaining fans this way only materializing very mutedly, and reception was lukewarm, as evidenced by the show's still declining ratings during season four.

The fifth season (1988–1989) saw the show return to its original timeslot, 10 pm on Friday nights and took the show on a yet more serious tone, with storylines becoming dark and gritty – enough so that even some of the most loyal fans were left perplexed. Some of the lack of script quality could be attributed to the Writers Guild strike throughout spring and summer of 1988, which ended just before filming of season 5 began, but greatly impacted its preparation. Tim Truman took over scoring the episodes for the remainder of the series' run and brought with him a style of instrumental synthesizer music that was markedly different from Jan Hammer's.

=== Cancellation ===
After still-declining ratings during the fourth season, NBC originally planned to order a shortened fifth season of only 13 episodes, but eventually settled for another full run, which was, either way, going to be the final season. At the beginning of season five, Olivia Brown recalled, "The show was trying to reinvent itself." Dick Wolf said in an interview for E! True Hollywood Story, after the fifth season, it was all just "...kind of over", and that the show had "run its course".

In May 1989, NBC aired the two-hour series finale, "Freefall". Despite its status as the "series finale", there were three episodes that did not air ("World of Trouble", "Miracle Man", and "Leap of Faith"), which appeared during the subsequent June re-runs as "Lost Episodes". A fourth, previously unaired episode, "Too Much Too Late", was aired for the first time on January 25, 1990, on the USA Network. It has since been run by other networks in syndication with the fifth-season episodes.

== Cast ==
Group photo of the cast members of Miami Vice (from left to right): (top) John Diehl, Michael Talbott, Saundra Santiago (middle) Edward James Olmos, Olivia Brown, Philip Michael Thomas (bottom) Don Johnson, taken during the second season

| Name | Portrayed by | Occupation | Seasons | | | | | Duration |
| Name | Portrayed by | Occupation | 1 | 2 | 3 | 4 | 5 | Duration |
|---|---|---|---|---|---|---|---|---|
| James "Sonny" Crockett | Don Johnson | Detective Sergeant | Main | | | | | 1x01–5x21 |
| Ricardo "Rico" Tubbs | Philip Michael Thomas | Detective Sergeant | Main | | | | | 1x01–5x21 |
| Gina Navarro Calabrese | Saundra Santiago | Detective | Main | | | | | 1x01–5x21 |
| Stanley "Stan" Switek | Michael Talbott | Detective | Main | | | | | 1x01–5x21 |
| Trudy Joplin | Olivia Brown | Detective | Main | | | | | 1x01–5x21 |
| Lawrence "Larry" Zito | John Diehl | Detective | Main | | | | | 1x01–3x13 |
| Lou Rodriguez | Gregory Sierra | Detective Lieutenant | Main | | | | | 1x01–1x04 |
| Martin "Marty" Castillo | Edward James Olmos | Detective Lieutenant | Main | | | | | 1x06–5x21 |

=== Main characters ===
- Don Johnson as Detective James "Sonny" Crockett: An undercover detective of the Metro-Dade Police Department. A former Florida Gators star wide receiver, he sustained a knee injury which put an end to his sports career. He served two tours in Vietnam – or as he calls it, the "Southeast Asia Conference". He joined Metro-Dade as a uniformed patrol officer and later an undercover detective of the vice unit. Crockett's alias is Sonny Burnett, a drug runner and middleman. His vehicles include a Ferrari Daytona Spyder (later a Ferrari Testarossa), a "Scarab" offshore power boat, and a sailboat on which he lives with his pet alligator Elvis. The name "Sonny Crockett" had previously been used for a criminal played by actor Dennis Burkley on Hill Street Blues in 1983, where creator Anthony Yerkovich was a writer. Coincidentally, Gregory Sierra who later plays Crockett's boss on Vice appears in the same episodes.
- Philip Michael Thomas as Detective Ricardo "Rico" Tubbs: A former New York Police Department detective who traveled to Miami as part of a personal vendetta against Calderone, the man who murdered his brother Rafael. After temporarily teaming up with Crockett, Tubbs follows his friend's advice and transfers to "a career in Southern law enforcement", fearing that after his serious violations of NYPD codes of conduct in the pilot episode, he would not be able to resume his job in New York. He joins the Miami department and becomes Crockett's permanent partner. He often poses as Rico Cooper, a wealthy buyer from out of town.
- Edward James Olmos as Lieutenant Martin "Marty" Castillo: He replaces the slain Rodriguez as head of the OCB. A very taciturn man, Castillo lives a reclusive life outside of work. He was formerly a DEA agent in the Golden Triangle of Southeast Asia during the late 1970s. During his time with the DEA he opposed the CIA in endorsing the trafficking of heroin to finance their overseas operations.
- Saundra Santiago as Detective Regina "Gina" Navarro Calabrese: A fearless female detective, who after Crockett's divorce, had a brief romance with him. Even though their relationship did not progress they still had a strong friendship.
- Olivia Brown as Detective Trudy Joplin: Gina's detective partner. Though tough, she sometimes struggles to cope with the consequences of her job, such as when she shoots and kills a man. Later in the series she has an encounter with a UFO and an alien portrayed by James Brown.
- Michael Talbott as Detective Stanley "Stan" Switek: A fellow police detective and Larry Zito's best friend. Although a good policeman, later on in the series he falls prey to a gambling addiction. He is also a big fan of Elvis Presley.
- John Diehl (1984–1987) as Detective Lawrence "Larry" Zito: A detective and Switek's surveillance partner and best friend. He is killed in the line of duty when a drug dealer gives him a fatal overdose.
- Gregory Sierra (1984) as Lieutenant Louis "Lou" Rodriguez: A police lieutenant who serves as commander of the Vice Unit. He is killed in the fourth episode by an assassin hired to kill Crockett.

=== Recurring characters ===
- Charlie Barnett (1984–1987) as Nugart Neville "Noogie" Lamont: A friend of Izzy's and informant for Crockett and Tubbs. His role was largely taken over by Izzy Moreno after the first season. In his final appearance in Season 4, his role is reduced from street informant to comic relief.
- Sheena Easton (1987–1988) as Caitlin Davies-Crockett: A pop singer who is assigned a police bodyguard, Crockett, for her testimony in a racketeering case. While protecting Caitlin, Sonny falls in love with her and they marry. Months after their marriage, Caitlin is killed by one of Crockett's former nemeses. Sonny later learns she was seven weeks pregnant, causing him further emotional turmoil.
- Martin Ferrero (1984–1989) as Isidore "Izzy" Moreno: A petty criminal and fast talker, Izzy is always known for getting into quick money schemes and giving Crockett and Tubbs the latest information from the street.
- Jose Perez (1985, 1989) as Juan Carlos Silva, a drug dealer and father of Rosetta Silva, and as Jorge "Georgie" Esteban, cousin of Izzy Moreno.
- Pam Grier (1985, 1989) as Valerie Gordon: A New York Police Department Officer and on-and-off love interest of Tubbs.
- Belinda Montgomery (1984–1989) as Caroline Crockett/Ballard: Crockett's former wife who moves to Ocala, Florida to remarry and raise their child, Billy. Caroline was having a baby with her second husband in her last appearance.

=== Guest appearances ===
Guest star Bruce Willis between Olmos (left) and Johnson in "No Exit"

Many actors, actresses, musicians, comedians, athletes and celebrities appear throughout the show's five-season run, playing various roles. Musicians include Sheena Easton, John Taylor, Andy Taylor, Willie Nelson, Gene Simmons, Ted Nugent, Glenn Frey, Frank Zappa, Phil Collins, Miles Davis, Frankie Valli, Little Richard, James Brown, Leonard Cohen, the Power Station, Coati Mundi, and Eartha Kitt.

Other personalities include auto executive Lee Iacocca and Watergate conspirator G. Gordon Liddy. Athletes include Boston Celtics center Bill Russell, Bernard King, racecar driver Danny Sullivan, and boxers Roberto Durán and Randall "Tex" Cobb.

Notable actors include Dean Stockwell, Pam Grier, Clarence Williams III, and Brian Dennehy.

The show frequently featured guest appearances from up-and-coming actors and actresses, including: Laurence Fishburne, Viggo Mortensen, Dennis Farina, Stanley Tucci, Jimmy Smits, Bruce McGill, David Strathairn, Ving Rhames, Liam Neeson, Lou Diamond Phillips, Bruce Willis, Ed O'Neill, and Julia Roberts. Additionally Michael Madsen, Ian McShane, Bill Paxton, Luis Guzmán, Kyra Sedgwick, Esai Morales, Terry O'Quinn, Joaquim de Almeida, Wesley Snipes, John Turturro, Melanie Griffith and Annie Golden to name a few. Notable comedians include John Leguizamo, David Rasche, Ben Stiller, Chris Rock, Tommy Chong, Richard Belzer, and Penn Jillette.

== Reception ==
=== Ratings ===
| Season | Time slot (ET) | Rank | Rating |
|---|---|---|---|
| 1984–85 | Sunday at 9:00 pm (Episode 1: 2 hour pilot); Friday at 10:00 pm (Episodes 2-23) | Not in the Top 30 | |
| 1985–86 | Friday at 9:00 pm (Episodes 1 and 2: 2 hour season premiere); Friday at 10:00 pm (Episodes 3–23) | 9 | 21.3 |
| 1986–87 | Friday at 9:00 pm | 26 | 16.8 (Tied with Knots Landing) |
| 1987–88 | Friday at 9:00 pm (Episodes 1–18); Friday at 10:00 pm (Episodes 19–22) | Not in the Top 30 | |
| 1988–89 | Friday at 10:00 pm (Episodes 1–8, 14); Friday at 9:00 pm (Episodes 9–13, 15–16); Sunday at 9:00 pm (Episodes 17 and 18: 2 hour finale); Wednesday at 10:00 pm (Episodes 19–21) | Not in the Top 30 | |

Series Finale: 22 million viewers & a 14.7 rating on May 21, 1989 from 9 to 11 pm. Competition: Everybody's Baby: The Rescue of Jessica McClure (22.9 rating) & Mickey Spillane's Mike Hammer: Murder Takes All (12.8 rating)

Final Airing on NBC: 16.1 million viewers/11.1 rating (June 28, 1989) China Beach drew 10.8 million viewers/8 rating.

In the UK, the series was first aired on BBC One, beginning on Monday, February 4, 1985 at 9:25 pm. It then began airing on Tuesdays at 9:25 pm, before moving to Thursdays in July. Season 1 concluded on August 8, 1985. Season 2 was shown between April 8 and July 15, 1986, and again from July 18 to October 3, 1987. Seasons 3-5 began airing on July 4, 1988 and ended with the finale "Freefall" on August 20, 1990 at 11:00 pm.

In (West) Germany, the series began airing on ARD on December 6, 1986. Seasons 1–3 were aired between 1986 and April 16, 1988, at first on Tuesdays at 9:45 pm, later on Saturday evenings. A few omitted episodes would be aired during 1988-1989. Seasons 4 and 5 aired between October 1991 and September 1992.

In Italy, the series began airing on Rai 2 on April 13, 1986.

=== Critical response ===
The series initially attracted controversy and polarized reactions; detractors objected to the show's usage of violence by dressing it with pretty photography, while others accused the show of relying more on visual aspects and music than on coherent stories and fully drawn characters. Civic leaders in Miami also objected to the show's airing of the city's crime problems all across America. Most civic leaders, however, were placated by the show's estimated contribution of $1 million per episode to the city's economy and because it boosted tourism to Miami. Gerald S. Arenberg of the National Association of Chiefs of Police criticized the show's glamorous depiction of vice squads, saying "no real vice cops chase drug dealers in a Ferrari while wearing $600 suits. More often than not, they're holed up in a crummy room somewhere, wearing jeans with holes in them, watching some beat-up warehouse in a godforsaken part of town through a pair of dented binoculars".

At the 1985 Emmy Awards Miami Vice was nominated for 15 Emmy Awards, including "Outstanding Writing in a Dramatic Series", "Outstanding Film Editing", "Outstanding Achievement for Music Composition for a series (dramatic underscore)", and "Outstanding Directing". At the end of the night, Miami Vice only won four Emmys. The following day, the Los Angeles Herald-Examiner concluded that more conservative Emmy voters rejected the show's portrayal of hedonism, violence, sex, and drugs.

The show's reputation has grown over time. Television critics Alan Sepinwall and Matt Zoller Seitz ranked Miami Vice as the 51st greatest American television series of all time in their 2016 book titled TV (The Book), with Seitz stating how the show was more influenced by 1960s art house cinema from Europe than by any other contemporary television drama: "Miami Vice superimposed 'ripped-from-the-headlines' details about drug smuggling, arms dealing, and covert war onto a pastel noir dreamscape. It gave American TV its first visionary existential drama".

People magazine cited Miami Vice as the "first show to look really new and different since color TV was invented".

=== Impact on popular culture ===
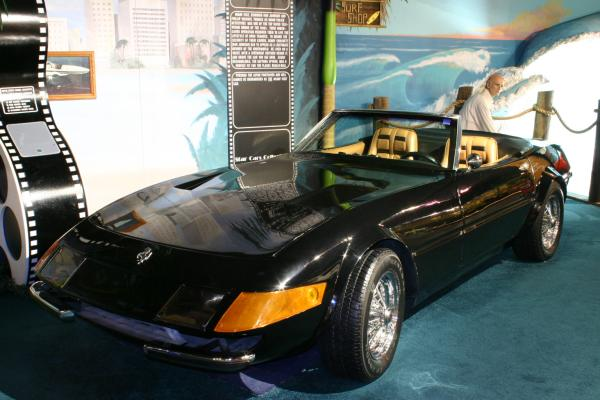
Replica 1972 Ferrari Daytona Spyder (actually a modified Chevrolet Corvette), the car driven by Don Johnson in Miami Vice until season three

Miami Vice was a groundbreaking police program of the 1980s. It had a notable impact on the decade's popular fashions and set the tone for the evolution of police drama. Series such as Homicide: Life on the Street, NYPD Blue, and the Law & Order franchise, though being markedly different in style and theme from Miami Vice, followed its lead in breaking the genre's mold; Dick Wolf, creator and executive producer of the Law & Order franchise, was a writer and later executive producer of Miami Vice. Parodies and pastiches of it have continued decades after it airs, such as the Only Fools and Horses Christmas episode "Miami Twice" (1991) and Moonbeam City (2015).

The video game Grand Theft Auto: Vice City, published by Rockstar Games in 2002, is heavily inspired by Miami Vice in multiple ways. It is set in a stylized 1980s Miami-inspired fictional city named "Vice City". Philip Michael Thomas voices one of the main characters, Lance Vance. "Crockett's Theme" is featured on the Emotion 98.3 in-game radio station. Two undercover police officers chosen from a selection of six character models resembling characters from Miami Vice appear in a police sports car within the game when the player obtains a three-star wanted level. In the prequel, Grand Theft Auto: Vice City Stories, there are two officers in the multiplayer mode named Cracker and Butts, an apparent parody of Crockett and Tubbs.

Many of the fashion styles and trends popularized by the TV show, such as fast cars and speed boats, unshaven beard stubble, a T-shirt under pastel suits, no socks, rolled up sleeves, boat shoes and Ray Ban sunglasses symbolize the stereotypical image of 1980s fashion and culture.

"Crockett's Theme" was covered by British band The French in a BBC Radio 1 Maida Vale session for John Peel in 2004, a re-recorded version was released by Darren Hayman and the Audio Antihero label in September 2026.

It has built an awareness of Miami in young people who had never thought of visiting Miami.

— William Cullom
Former President of the Greater Miami Chamber of Commerce

The show also had a lasting impact on Miami itself. It drew a large amount of media attention to the beginning revitalization of the South Beach and Art Deco District areas of Miami Beach, as well as other portions of Greater Miami, and increased tourism and investment. Even 40 years after Miami Vice first aired, it is still responsible for its share of tourist visits to the city. The fact that Crockett and Tubbs were detectives with the county's then Metro-Dade police, not the Miami Police Department, represented the growing notion of metro government in Miami. In 1997, a county referendum changed the name from Dade County to Miami-Dade County. This allowed people to relate the county government at large to perceptions and iconography of the city of Miami, many of which were first popularized by Miami Vice. In January 2025, the Miami-Dade Police Department (previously Metro-Dade) was rechristened the Miami-Dade Sheriff's Office, following a 2018 amendment to the state's constitution that led to the 2024 election of the county's first sheriff since the 1960s.

== Home media ==
Universal Studios has released all Miami Vice seasons on DVD for regions 1, 2, and 4. Seasons 1 & 2 were released in 2005, and seasons 3 through 5 were released in 2007. The DVD release of the series had been significantly slow due to one of the signature features of the show: the heavy integration of 1980s rock and pop music. The music was difficult to source the rights to and acquire permission to use. (On at least one MCA/Universal Home Video VHS release of the pilot, the Rolling Stones' song "Miss You" had been replaced by generic rock music.) In the November 2004 announcement for the DVD release of the series, Universal promises that all original music in the series would be intact. On August 21, 2007, Universal announced the November 13, 2007, release of the complete series, with all five seasons on 27 single-sided DVDs. The seasons are in their own Digipak-style cases, and the set is housed in a faux alligator-skin package. Seasons 1 and 2 contained six single-sided discs, rather than the three double-sided discs in the initial release. The Region 2 version has different packaging, does not use double-sided discs, and although there are no special features stated on the packaging they are contained within the season 1 discs.

On March 8, 2016, it is announced that Mill Creek Entertainment had acquired the rights to the series in Region 1; they subsequently re-released the first two seasons on DVD on May 3, 2016.

On October 4, 2016, Mill Creek re-released Miami Vice – The Complete Series on DVD and also released the complete series on Blu-ray.

| DVD name | Ep# | Release dates | | | Special features |
| DVD name | Ep# | Region 1 | Region 2 | Region 4 | Special features |
|---|---|---|---|---|---|
| Season One | 22 | February 8, 2005 | April 25, 2005 | July 13, 2005 | "The Vibe of Vice", "Building the Perfect Vice", "The Music of Vice", "Miami After Vice" |
| Season Two | 22 | November 22, 2005 | July 24, 2006 | July 20, 2006 | |
| Season Three | 24 | March 20, 2007 | May 14, 2007 | July 5, 2007 | |
| Season Four | 22 | March 20, 2007 | August 13, 2007 | December 4, 2007 | |
| Season Five | 21 | June 26, 2007 | December 26, 2007 | July 29, 2009 | |
| Seasons One & Two | 44 | N/A | November 27, 2006 | N/A | |
| The Complete Series | 111 | November 13, 2007 | October 8, 2007 | TBA | Same special features from season one. |

== Video game ==
In January 2004, Dutch publisher Davilex Games secured the rights from Universal to release a game based on the series. The game was developed by British developer Atomic Planet Entertainment and released exclusively in Europe on the PlayStation 2, Xbox and Windows later on in the year.

== Adaptations ==
Mann directed a 2006 film adaptation starring Jamie Foxx and Colin Farrell. A new film adaptation directed by Joseph Kosinski and written by Dan Gilroy was announced in 2025. Michael B. Jordan and Austin Butler were in talks to star, and would officially sign on in April 2026, with the film being retitled to Miami Vice '85. The film is set to be released on May 19, 2028.
