= James "Sonny" Crockett =

Miami Vice fictional character

- Miami Vice character
- Don Johnson as Sonny Crockett
- First appearance: "Brother's Keeper"
- Portrayed by: Don Johnson (series); Colin Farrell (2006 film); Austin Butler (2028 film)

In-universe information
- Alias: Sonny Burnett
- Nickname: Sonny
- Title: Detective
- Occupation: Metro-Dade Police sergeant
- Family: Jake Crockett (cousin, series)
- Spouses: Caroline (divorced, series); Caitlin Davies (deceased, series)
- Children: Billy Crockett (with Caroline)
- Relatives: Jack Crockett (cousin, series)
- Nationality: American

Detective James "Sonny" Crockett is a fictional character in the NBC television series Miami Vice. Crockett was originally portrayed by Don Johnson in the television series from 1984 to 1990, later by Colin Farrell in the feature film in 2006 and Austin Butler in the upcoming 2028 film. Crockett appeared in every episode of Miami Vice except the fifth season episode "Borrasca". He has also appeared in video games and various popular culture references of the show.

== Appearances ==
=== Television ===
James Crockett, more commonly known as Sonny Crockett, is a detective in the Metro-Dade Police Department (now the Miami-Dade Sheriff's Office). He holds the rank of detective sergeant in the MDPD.

Crockett is a former Florida Gators star who had sustained an injury which put an end to his sports career. He served two tours in Vietnam – or as he calls it, the "Southeast Asia Conference". He joined Metro-Dade sometime after returning from Vietnam, and in the academy, he made friends with Evan Freed and Mike Orgel. He started his police career first as an uniformed patrol officer, before getting promoted to Detective and assigned to Robbery Division under Lieutenant Frank Malone, where he was partnered with Detective Frankel. In 1979, Crockett and Frankel were working undercover on the case of armored car robbery by Frank Hackman and his crew, however, their covers were blown and in early 1980, after Crockett dropped him off at home, Frankel was killed by Hackman. Hours later, Crockett arrested Hackman, who was later sentenced to death. Crockett was then transferred to Vice Division, where he, Freed and Orgel were assigned to investigate illegal drug sales in nightclubs. When some of the nightclubs turned out to be gay bars, Orgel did not want to participate. Teasing him about it, Freed outed Orgel as gay and started mistreating him with homophobic slurs. Crockett, who did not know how to handle the situation, kept silent. Orgel was assigned to desk duty and ended up committing "cop suicide" by attempting to arrest a suspect high on "angel dust" carrying a shotgun. Crockett and Freed would end up carrying the guilt of his death.

Crockett first appears in the pilot episode of Miami Vice (1984) as an undercover vice cop on the trail of a Colombian drug lord known simply as "the Colombian." While undercover he meets Ricardo "Rico" Tubbs (Philip Michael Thomas), an NYPD undercover officer, who too is on the trail of a drug dealer and cop killer, Calderone (Miguel Piñero). Calderone and "the Colombian" are the same person. Crockett and Tubbs both go undercover as Sonny Burnett and Rico Cooper respectively, trying to get closer to Calderone. They are successful and in the end capture him. Just as they go to see him in jail, Calderone makes his $2 million bail and is on his way out of the country. Crockett promises Tubbs that they will get him, but as reconciliation asks him if he is interested in a career in "Southern Law Enforcement" (e.g., transferring from the NYPD to the MDPD), thus beginning their new partnership.

At first, Crockett appears difficult to get along with (a notion which he admits himself in episodes Brother's Keeper, and Nobody Lives Forever). He is a man of few words with a tough exterior, but can also be a loving and caring person. His softer side is revealed when innocent victims die or suffer injustice at the hands of villains or when someone pays the price for others' mistakes. Crockett despises those who use or deceive others for self-serving reasons. He is a highly moral person who assiduously honors his own promises and commitments, and he expects no less from others.

Crockett is a cigarette smoker. He is often seen smoking cigarettes on stakeouts and inside Vice headquarters. He tends to smoke when he is concerned or worried. In Season 4, he claims that he has quit smoking.

Crockett's hard exterior stems in part from the type of work he performs and also from rough experiences from his past, losing friends, partners, and other people he has been close to or otherwise deeply cared about. From time to time, these memories haunt him and he struggles with feelings of guilt and because of difficult decisions he has had to make. He is very close with his friends and colleagues, Switek, Zito, Gina and Trudy, as well as with his supervisor, MDPD Lieutenant Martin Castillo, and especially with his partner, Ricardo Tubbs. Crockett is depicted as a rogue character who lives by his own set of rules and he is often angered by and in conflict with orders from his superiors. This part of his persona is emphasized by the fact that he lives on a sailing yacht moored in Miami's luxurious Miamarina and keeps an alligator as a pet on the same boat, and drives a Ferrari - first a black Daytona Spyder, and after it is destroyed by a Stinger missile, a white Testarossa. The character first used a SIG Sauer P220 as his main firearm in the pilot episode, but this was replaced by the Dornaus & Dixon's Bren Ten. After Dornaus & Dixon went out of business, since the producers would not use discontinued guns, he would switch to Smith & Wesson Model 645 in Season 3, and in Season 5, to its successor, Model 4506.

Crockett was married to Caroline, with whom he has a son, Billy. Due to the stress brought on by Crockett's profession - working as an undercover vice detective, "living the life" away from home to maintain his "cover" - Caroline filed for divorce in 1984 and planned to move to Atlanta with Billy. However, due to increasingly bitter legal process, he and Caroline decided to fire their lawyers and give their relationship one more shot. However, after they, along with Billy, barely survive a hit by assassin Ludovici Armstrong, who was hired by Calderone to kill Crockett, Caroline really realizes the stress and dangers of his job and they agree to divorce, and Caroline and Billy move away. Crockett would not then see Billy for three years, until he goes to see him after accidentally shooting a 13-year old child who drew a gun on him. Around the same time, Crockett was assigned with protecting pop singer Caitlin Davies, who was scheduled to testify against her former manager Tommy Lowe. Though at first Crockett and Davies clashed over their professions, they ended up falling in love after Crockett saved her from a hit by Lowe's hitmen, and they got married, buying a house and agreeing not to let each other's careers interfere with their lives.

Towards the end of the series, Crockett's role in the investigations decreased and he began to burn out. While Davies was away on a European tour, Crockett was shot in the line of duty by the girlfriend of a drug dealer he shot, and was left in hospital fighting for his life, but he would recover. However, after Caitlin returned from her tour and was reunited with Crockett, she was killed by Hackman (whom Crockett had erroneously had released from death row two years earlier). Upon learning that she was six weeks pregnant with their child, Crockett went into a drunken rage, tracked down Hackman and killed him. He would never fully recover from Davies' death. After getting caught in a boat explosion while undercover, Crockett suffered amnesia and briefly adopted his cover of Sonny Burnett, starting working for Miami drug cartels. However, after he survived a car bomb hit on his life, his memory returned, and horrified at what he had become, and seeing no alternative, he turned himself in to his squad. However, having lost the trust of his friends and facing the risk of being jailed for the crimes committed as Burnett, Crockett escaped from custody and took down the rest of the cartel, saving Tubbs' life in the process. Though it helped him earn back some of the trust he had lost, he still had to answer for his crimes, and was ordered to take time off and would have to undergo questioning and psychiatric evaluations. Though he would be later exonerated, and his friends slowly began to trust him again, he was still left with the mental scarring of his brief life as Burnett.

In addition to the aforementioned personal tragedies, he also lost faith in his work when he realized that he cannot win the battle against all the drug cartels and crooks with several others waiting in the wings to replace those he busted, and encountered increasing corruption in the justice system he was working to uphold, with the wealth of lawyers and politically-minded senior police officials all too eager to handcuff his attempts at fighting the influx of drugs for the sake of advancing their own careers. Tubbs later comes to the same realization.

The breaking point would come in the final episode of the series, when the two of them are assigned with protecting General Borbon, the military dictator of Costa Morada, who would testify against major drug producers in his home country. However, it all turned out to be a ruse to ensure Borbon's silence regarding corruption in the very highest levels of the American government. As the government agents attempt to whisk Borbon away in a seaplane, Crockett and Tubbs shoot the seaplane down, killing everyone on board. When the head agent assigned to the case, Colonel Andrew Baker, threatens to take their badges for their actions, they throw their badges on the ground and resign from the police force in disgust, despite Castillo's pleas to reconsider. Having packed up his few personal possessions in a duffel bag, Crockett meets up with Tubbs, who is going back to New York, one last time and offers him a ride to the airport in his "stolen" Ferrari, while he himself intends to "head further south, where the water is warm, the drinks are cold, and I don't know the names of the players".

The name "Sonny Crockett" had previously been used for a criminal played by actor Dennis Burkley on Hill Street Blues in 1983, where creator Anthony Yerkovich was a writer. Coincidentally, Gregory Sierra who later played Crockett's original supervisor (before Edward James Olmos was cast) appeared in the same episodes.

=== Film ===
For the 2006 film adaptation of Miami Vice, James "Sonny" Crockett was completely reinvented and thus had no relation to the television series character. He had no backstory, the only backstory being for his alias Sonny Burnett. The television version of Crockett carried a lot of personal baggage and so the new Crockett, by contrast, could travel light and sleek, with no backstories to "burden the picture" with exposition. The film version of Crockett is shown to be stern, cavalier, reservedly flirtatious and somewhat impulsive, but nonetheless a dedicated undercover officer who is loyal to his team. In describing his portrayal of the character, actor Colin Farrell stated, "If I was to think about the early Crockett, I would have been in trouble because I would have been arguing over the suits that I wanted to wear and no socks with my slip-ons, and all that kind of stuff". Farrell ultimately did not look to Don Johnson's portrayal for much inspiration. However, Farrell did admit in later interviews that the handlebar moustache he chose for Crockett's physical appearance was an idea he regretted after seeing it on film.

== Reception ==
=== Awards and recognitions ===
Year	Result	Award	Category	Recipient(s)
1985	Nominated	Emmy Awards	Outstanding Lead Actor in a Drama Series	Don Johnson
1986	Winner	Golden Globe Awards	Best Performance by an Actor In A Television Series - Drama	Don Johnson
1987	Nominated	Golden Globe Awards	Best Performance by an Actor In A Television Series - Drama	Don Johnson

== Impact on popular culture ==
In 2006, coinciding with the release of the feature film, a Det. James "Sonny" Crockett action figure was released. It included a figure of Crockett and a plastic alligator. In 2006, Grand Theft Auto: Vice City Stories was released, and included a character based on Crockett, who interacts with Lance Vance, voiced by Philip Michael Thomas, and Phil Collins himself, who performs a full length in-game version of "In the Air Tonight".

In a deleted scene of The Office episode "Special Project", Stanley walks into Andy's office wearing a white suit with a pink shirt. Phillis goes on to remark "Where's Crockett?" To which Stanley replies "I am Crockett."

In Back to the Future: The Game, Sonny Crockett is one of the pseudonyms that the player can choose for Marty McFly.

Sonny's backstory of college football prowess and being a Vietnam War veteran were transferred onto the character Bobby Bridges on Don Johnson's other cop show Nash Bridges.

In the TV comedy series 30 Rock, Kenneth Parcell has a pet parakeet called Sonny Crockett, but the fact he had owned it for 60 years suggests it was not named for the character.
