= Anthony Yerkovich =

American television producer and writer

- Occupation(s): Television producer and writer
- Years active: 1981–2006

Anthony Yerkovich is an American television producer and writer.

He is best known for creating the 1980s cop show Miami Vice. He served as the show's executive producer along with Michael Mann before handing over full executive responsibilities to Mann after only six episodes.

His other television credits include Starsky & Hutch (1977–1978), 240-Robert (1979) and Hart to Hart (1981) as writer, Hill Street Blues (1981–1983) as writer and supervising producer, Private Eye (1987–1988) as creator and executive producer, and Big Apple (2001) as writer and executive producer. He also wrote the made-for-TV film Hollywood Confidential (1997) starring Edward James Olmos and reunited with Mann to executive produce the Miami Vice film, released in 2006.
