= List of American films of 2025 =

This is a list of American films released in 2025.

Following the box office section, this list is organized chronologically, providing information on release dates, production companies, directors, and principal cast members.

== Box office ==
The highest-grossing American films released in 2025, by domestic box office gross revenue, are as follows:

Rank	Title	Distributor	Domestic gross
1	Zootopia 2	Disney	$428,130,160
2	A Minecraft Movie	Warner Bros.	$424,087,780
3	Lilo & Stitch	Disney	$423,778,855
4	Avatar: Fire and Ash	20th Century	$404,340,010
5	Superman	Warner Bros.	$354,184,465
6	Wicked: For Good	Universal	$342,915,090
7	Jurassic World Rebirth	Universal	$339,640,400
8	Sinners	Warner Bros.	$279,978,513
9	The Fantastic Four: First Steps	Disney	$274,286,610
10	How to Train Your Dragon	Universal	$262,958,100

== January–March ==
Opening		Title	Production company	Cast and crew	Ref.
J A N U A R Y	3	The Damned	Vertical / Ley Line Entertainment	Thordur Palsson (director); Jamie Hannigan (screenplay); Odessa Young, Joe Cole, Siobhan Finneran, Rory McCann, Turlough Convery, Lewis Gribben, Francis Magee	
J A N U A R Y	10	Den of Thieves 2: Pantera	Lionsgate / Tucker Tooley Entertainment / G-BASE / Entertainment One	Christian Gudegast (director/screenplay); Gerard Butler, O'Shea Jackson Jr., Evin Ahmad, Salvatore Esposito, Meadow Williams	
J A N U A R Y	10	Extremely Unique Dynamic	Strand Releasing	Katherine Dudas, Ivan Leung, Harrison Xu (directors/screenplay); Ivan Leung, Harrison Xu, Hudson Yang, Nathan Doan	
J A N U A R Y	10	Laws of Man	Saban Films	Phil Blattenberger (director/screenplay); Jacob Keohane, Jackson Rathbone, Richard Brake	
J A N U A R Y	14	Man with No Past	Paramount Pictures	James Bamford (director); Steven Paul (screenplay); Adam Woodward, Marton Csokas, Charlotte Weston, Philip Winchester, Jeff Alexander, Jon Voight	
J A N U A R Y	14	Riley	Charthouse / Dark Star Pictures / Windsor Film Company	Benjamin Howard (director/screenplay); Jake Holley, Colin McCalla, Riley Quinn Scott, Connor Storrie, Rib Hillis, Caroline Amiguet	
J A N U A R Y	17	One of Them Days	TriStar Pictures / Hoorae Media	Lawrence Lamont (director); Syreeta Singleton (screenplay); Keke Palmer, SZA, Maude Apatow, Lil Rel Howery, Janelle James, Katt Williams	
J A N U A R Y	17	Wolf Man	Universal Pictures / Blumhouse Productions	Leigh Whannell (director/screenplay); Corbett Tuck (screenplay); Christopher Abbott, Julia Garner, Matilda Firth, Sam Jaeger	
J A N U A R Y	17	Back in Action	Netflix / Chernin Entertainment	Seth Gordon (director/screenplay); Brendan O'Brien (screenplay); Cameron Diaz, Jamie Foxx, Andrew Scott, Jamie Demetriou, Kyle Chandler, Glenn Close	
J A N U A R Y	17	Alarum	Lionsgate	Michael Polish (director); Alexander Vesha (screenplay); Scott Eastwood, Sylvester Stallone, Willa Fitzgerald, Mike Colter, Ísis Valverde, D. W. Moffett	
J A N U A R Y	17	Henry Danger: The Movie	Paramount+ / Nickelodeon Productions / Awesomeness Films	Joe Menendez (director); Jake Farrow, Christopher J. Nowak (screenplay); Jace Norman, Sean Ryan Fox, Ella Anderson, Michael D. Cohen, Frankie Grande, Glee Dango	
J A N U A R Y	17	Wish You Were Here	Lionsgate	Julia Stiles (director/screenplay); Renée Carlino (screenplay); Isabelle Fuhrman, Mena Massoud, Jimmie Fails, Kelsey Grammer, Jennifer Grey, Antonique Smith, Jordan Gavaris	
J A N U A R Y	17	Both Eyes Open	RodFather Productions	Ariel Julia Hairston (director/screenplay); Gail Bean, Taye Diggs, Joy Brunson, Christie Leverette, Mack Wilds, Michael Oloyede, Carla Fisher	
J A N U A R Y	21	Werewolf Game	Different Duck Films	Jackie Payne, Cara Brennan (director); Jackie Payne (screenplay); Tony Todd, Lydia Hearst, Bai Ling, Robert Picardo	
J A N U A R Y	22	Marked Men: Rule + Shaw	Voltage Pictures	Nick Cassavetes (director); Sharon Soboil (screenplay); Chase Stokes, Sydney Taylor, Hannah Kepple, Alexander Ludwig, Natalie Alyn Lind, Inanna Sarkis, Tonya Cornelisse	
J A N U A R Y	24	Flight Risk	Lionsgate / Davis Entertainment / Icon Productions	Mel Gibson (director); Jared Rosenberg (screenplay); Mark Wahlberg, Michelle Dockery, Topher Grace	
J A N U A R Y	24	Presence	Neon / Sugar23	Steven Soderbergh (director); David Koepp (screenplay); Lucy Liu, Chris Sullivan, Callina Liang, Eddy Maday, West Mulholland, Julia Fox	
J A N U A R Y	24	Star Trek: Section 31	Paramount+ / Secret Hideout / Roddenberry Entertainment / CBS Studios	Olatunde Osunsanmi (director); Craig Sweeny (screenplay); Michelle Yeoh, Omari Hardwick, Kacey Rohl, Sam Richardson, Sven Ruygrok, Robert Kazinsky, Humberly González, James Hiroyuki Liao	
J A N U A R Y	24	Inheritance	IFC Films / Miramax	Neil Burger (director/screenplay); Olen Steinhauer (screenplay); Phoebe Dynevor, Rhys Ifans, Ciara Baxendale, Kersti Bryan	
J A N U A R Y	24	Brave the Dark	Angel Studios	Damian Harris (director/screenplay); Dale G. Bradley, Lynn Robertson-Hay, Nathaniel Deen, John P. Spencer (screenplay); Jared Harris, Nicholas Hamilton, Jamie Harris	
J A N U A R Y	24	Into the Deep	Saban Capital Group	Christian Sesma (director); Chad Law, Josh Ridgway (screenplay); Richard Dreyfuss, Scout Taylor-Compton, Jon Seda, Stuart Townsend	
J A N U A R Y	24	Bau: Artist at War	Showbiz Direct / Republic Pictures	Sean McNamara (director); Deborah Smerecnik, Ronald Bass, Sonia Kifferstein (screenplay); Emile Hirsch, Inbar Lavi, Josh Zuckerman, Brittany Mitchell, Adam Tsekhman, Eugene Lipinski, Michael Benyaer, Josh Blacker, Yan Tual	
J A N U A R Y	28	Failure!	Promotora NAE / Red Water Entertainment	Alex Kahuam (director/screenplay); Ted Raimi, Merrick McCartha, Noel Douglas Orput, Melissa Diaz, Christin Muuli, Daniel Kuhlman	
J A N U A R Y	30	You're Cordially Invited	Amazon MGM Studios / Gloria Sanchez Productions / Hello Sunshine	Nicholas Stoller (director/screenplay); Will Ferrell, Reese Witherspoon, Geraldine Viswanathan, Meredith Hagner, Jimmy Tatro, Stony Blyden, Leanne Morgan, Rory Scovel, Keyla Monterroso Mejia, Ramona Young, Jack McBrayer, Fortune Feimster, Celia Weston	
J A N U A R Y	31	Dog Man	Universal Pictures / DreamWorks Animation	Peter Hastings (director/screenplay); Pete Davidson, Lil Rel Howery, Isla Fisher, Lucas Hopkins Calderon, Ricky Gervais	
J A N U A R Y	31	Companion	Warner Bros. Pictures / New Line Cinema / Vertigo Entertainment	Drew Hancock (director/screenplay); Sophie Thatcher, Jack Quaid, Lukas Gage, Megan Suri, Harvey Guillén, Rupert Friend	
J A N U A R Y	31	Valiant One	Briarcliff Entertainment / Brightlight Pictures	Steve Barnett (director/screenplay); Eric Tipton (screenplay); Chase Stokes, Lana Condor, Desmin Borges, Callan Mulvey, Jonathan Whitesell, Daniel Jun	
J A N U A R Y	31	Love Me	Bleecker Street / 2AM	Sam Zuchero, Andy Zuchero (director/screenplay); Kristen Stewart, Steven Yeun	
J A N U A R Y	31	Like Father Like Son	Lionsgate	Barry Jay (director/screenplay); Dylan Flashner, Ariel Winter, Vivica A. Fox, Mayim Bialik, Dermot Mulroney	
J A N U A R Y	31	Green and Gold	Fathom Events	Anders Lindwall (director/screenplay); Missy Mareau Garcia, Michael Graf, Steven Shafer (screenplay); Craig T. Nelson, Brandon Sklenar, M. Emmet Walsh, Madison Lawlor, Annabel Armour	
J A N U A R Y	31	Round the Decay	Dreamscape Productions	Adam Newman (director/screenplay); Victoria Mirrer, Damian Maffei, Sienna Hubert-Ross, Cary Hite, Alexis Safoyan, Rachel Pizzolato, Phil Duran	
J A N U A R Y	31	The Devil and the Daylong Brothers	Quiver Distribution	Brandon McCormick (director/screenplay); Brendan Bradley, Nican Robinson, Jordon Bolden, Rainey Qualley	
F E B R U A R Y	4	Good Bad Things	Music Box Films	Shane D. Stanger (director/screenplay); Danny Kurtzman (screenplay); Jessica Parker Kennedy, Brett Dier, Danny Kurtzman	
F E B R U A R Y	5	Kinda Pregnant	Netflix / Happy Madison Productions	Tyler Spindel (director); Julie Paiva (screenplay); Amy Schumer, Jillian Bell, Brianne Howey, Damon Wayans Jr., Will Forte	
F E B R U A R Y	7	Heart Eyes	Screen Gems / Spyglass Media Group / Divide/Conquer	Josh Ruben (director); Phillip Murphy, Michael Kennedy, Christopher Landon (screenplay); Olivia Holt, Mason Gooding, Gigi Zumbado, Michaela Watkins, Jordana Brewster, Devon Sawa	
F E B R U A R Y	7	Love Hurts	Universal Pictures / 87North Productions	Jonathan Eusebio (director); Matthew Murray, Josh Stoddard, Luke Passmore (screenplay); Ke Huy Quan, Ariana DeBose, Daniel Wu, Marshawn Lynch, Mustafa Shakir, Lio Tipton, Rhys Darby, André Eriksen, Sean Astin	
F E B R U A R Y	7	Jazzy	Vertical / Duplass Brothers Productions	Morrisa Maltz (director/screenplay); Lainey Bearkiller Shangreaux, Vanara Taing, Andrew Hajek (screenplay); Jasmine Bearkiller Shangreaux, Syriah Foohead Means, Lily Gladstone	
F E B R U A R Y	7	I Love You Forever	Utopia	Cazzie David, Elisa Kalani (directors/screenplay); Sofia Black-D'Elia, Ray Nicholson, Jon Rudnitsky, Cazzie David, Raymond Cham Jr., Oliver Cooper	
F E B R U A R Y	7	Renner	Seismic Releasing / Slated	Robert Rippberger (director); Luke Medina, Martin Medina (screenplay); Frankie Muniz, Violett Beane, Taylor Gray, Marcia Gay Harden	
F E B R U A R Y	7	When I'm Ready	Quiver Distribution / Briarcliff Entertainment	Andrew Johnson (director); Andrew Ortenberg (screenplay); Andrew Ortenberg, June Schreiner, Thalia Besson, Lauren Cohan, Dermot Mulroney	
F E B R U A R Y	11	The Witcher: Sirens of the Deep	Netflix / Studio Mir / Platige Image	Kang Hei Chul (director); Mike Ostrowski, Rae Benjamin (screenplay); Doug Cockle, Joey Batey, Anya Chalotra, Christina Wren	
F E B R U A R Y	13	Bridget Jones: Mad About the Boy	Peacock / Universal Pictures / StudioCanal / Miramax / Working Title Films	Michael Morris (director); Helen Fielding, Dan Mazer, Abi Morgan (screenplay); Renée Zellweger, Chiwetel Ejiofor, Leo Woodall, Jim Broadbent, Isla Fisher, Colin Firth, Hugh Grant	
F E B R U A R Y	13	La Dolce Villa	Netflix	Mark Waters (director); Elizabeth Hackett, Hilary Galanoy (screenplay); Scott Foley, Maia Reficco, Violante Placido, Giuseppe Futia	
F E B R U A R Y	14	Captain America: Brave New World	Marvel Studios	Julius Onah (director/screenplay); Rob Edwards, Malcolm Spellman, Dalan Musson, Peter Glanz (screenplay); Anthony Mackie, Danny Ramirez, Shira Haas, Carl Lumbly, Xosha Roquemore, Giancarlo Esposito, Liv Tyler, Tim Blake Nelson, Harrison Ford	
F E B R U A R Y	14	The Gorge	Apple TV+ / Apple Studios / Skydance Media	Scott Derrickson (director); Zach Dean (screenplay); Miles Teller, Anya Taylor-Joy, Sope Dirisu, Sigourney Weaver	
F E B R U A R Y	14	The Long Game	Vertical	Jace Anderson (director/screenplay); Adam Gierasch (screenplay); Kathleen Turner, Jackie Earle Haley, Sekai Abenì, Ever Carradine, Chris Mulkey	
F E B R U A R Y	14	The Dead Thing	Shudder	Elric Kane (director/screenplay); Webb Wilcoxen (screenplay); Blu Hunt, Ben Smith-Petersen	
F E B R U A R Y	14	Rounding	Music Box Films / Fifth Season / MarVista Entertainment	Alex Thompson (director/screenplay); Namir Smallwood, Sidney Flanigan, Michael Potts, Rebecca Spence	
F E B R U A R Y	14	You, Me & Her	Attend / Two Hands Productions	Dan Levy Dagerman (director); Selina Ringel (screenplay); Selina Ringel, Ritesh Rajan, Sydney Park	
F E B R U A R Y	14	One Night in Tokyo	Kitsune Pictures / Buffalo 8	Joshua Woodcock (director/screenplay); Reza Emamiyeh, Tokiko Kitagawa	
F E B R U A R Y	21	The Monkey	Neon / Black Bear Pictures / Atomic Monster / The Safran Company	Osgood Perkins (director/screenplay); Theo James, Tatiana Maslany, Christian Convery, Colin O'Brien, Rohan Campbell, Sarah Levy, Adam Scott, Elijah Wood	
F E B R U A R Y	21	The Unbreakable Boy	Lionsgate / Kingdom Story Company / Wonder Project	Jon Gunn (director/screenplay); Zachary Levi, Meghann Fahy, Jacob Laval, Drew Powell, Amy Acker, Patricia Heaton	
F E B R U A R Y	21	Millers in Marriage	Republic Pictures	Edward Burns (director/screenplay); Morena Baccarin, Benjamin Bratt, Edward Burns, Brian d'Arcy James, Minnie Driver, Julianna Margulies, Gretchen Mol, Campbell Scott, Patrick Wilson	
F E B R U A R Y	21	Old Guy	The Avenue / Dark Castle Entertainment	Simon West (director); Greg Johnson (screenplay); Christoph Waltz, Lucy Liu, Cooper Hoffman, Desmond Eastwood	
F E B R U A R Y	21	Lifeline	Dark Sky Films	Feras Alfuqaha (director); Brady Morell, Brian Price (screenplay); Josh Stewart, Judah Lewis, Craig Stark, Charlene Amoia, Luke Benwa, August Maturo, Brecken Merrill	
F E B R U A R Y	25	The Buildout	Ethos Releasing	Zeshaan Younus (director/screenplay); Jenna Kanell, Hannah Alline, Natasha Halevi, Michael Sung Ho, Danielle Evon Ploeger, Ariel Barber	
F E B R U A R Y	28	Last Breath	Focus Features / Dark Castle Entertainment / FilmNation Entertainment	Alex Parkinson (director/screenplay); Mitchell LaFortune, David Brooks (screenplay); Woody Harrelson, Simu Liu, Finn Cole, Cliff Curtis	
F E B R U A R Y	28	Riff Raff	Roadside Attractions / Grindstone Entertainment Group / Signature Films	Dito Montiel (director); John Pollono (screenplay); Jennifer Coolidge, Gabrielle Union, Pete Davidson, Ed Harris, Bill Murray	
F E B R U A R Y	28	My Dead Friend Zoe	Briarcliff Entertainment / Legion M	Kyle Hausmann-Stokes (director/screenplay); A. J. Bermudez (screenplay); Sonequa Martin-Green, Natalie Morales, Ed Harris, Morgan Freeman, Gloria Reuben, Utkarsh Ambudkar	
F E B R U A R Y	28	Cold Wallet	Well Go USA Entertainment	Cutter Hodierne (director); John Hibey (screenplay); Raul Castillo, Melonie Diaz, Tony Cavalero, Josh Brener, Zoe Winters	
F E B R U A R Y	28	No Address	Robert Craig Films	Julia Verdin (director/screenplay); James J. Papa (screenplay); William Baldwin, Ashanti, Xander Berkeley, Beverly D'Angelo, Ty Pennington, Lucas Jade Zumann, Kristanna Loken, Patricia Velásquez	
F E B R U A R Y	28	Uppercut	Lionsgate	Torsten Ruether (director/screenplay); Ving Rhames, Luise Grossman, Jordan E. Cooper, Joanna Cassidy, Lynn Favin	
F E B R U A R Y	28	The Accidental Getaway Driver	Utopia / Thunder Road Films	Sing J. Lee (director/screenplay); Christopher Chen (screenplay); Hiep Tran Nghia, Dustin Nguyen, Dali Benssalah, Phi Vu, Gabrielle Chan	
M A R C H	7	Mickey 17	Warner Bros. Pictures / Plan B Entertainment	Bong Joon-ho (director/screenplay); Robert Pattinson, Naomi Ackie, Steven Yeun, Patsy Ferran, Cameron Britton, Daniel Henshall, Stephen Park, Anamaria Vartolomei, Toni Collette, Mark Ruffalo	
M A R C H	7	The Electric State	Netflix / AGBO / Skybound Entertainment	Anthony Russo, Joe Russo (directors); Christopher Markus, Stephen McFeely (screenplay); Millie Bobby Brown, Chris Pratt, Ke Huy Quan, Jason Alexander, Woody Norman, Giancarlo Esposito, Stanley Tucci, Woody Harrelson, Anthony Mackie, Brian Cox, Jenny Slate	
M A R C H	7	In the Lost Lands	Vertical / Constantin Film / FilmNation Entertainment	Paul W. S. Anderson (director/screenplay); Constantin Werner (screenplay); Milla Jovovich, Dave Bautista, Arly Jover, Amara Okereke	
M A R C H	7	Plankton: The Movie	Netflix / Nickelodeon Movies	Dave Needham (director); Kaz, Chris Viscardi, Mr. Lawrence (screenplay); Mr. Lawrence, Jill Talley, Tom Kenny, Bill Fagerbakke, Clancy Brown, Rodger Bumpass, Carolyn Lawrence, Lori Alan, Mary Jo Catlett	
M A R C H	7	On Becoming a Guinea Fowl	A24 / Fremantle / BBC Film / Element Pictures	Rungano Nyoni (director/screenplay); Susan Chardy, Elizabeth Chisela, Henry B.J. Phiri	
M A R C H	7	F*** Marry Kill	Lionsgate Premiere / BuzzFeed Studios	Laura Murphy (director); Ivan Diaz, Dan Scheinkman, Meghan Brown (screenplay); Lucy Hale, Virginia Gardner, Brooke Nevin	
M A R C H	7	Eephus	Music Box Films	Carson Lund (director/screenplay); Michael Basta, Nate Fisher (screenplay); Keith William Richards, Frederick Wiseman, Cliff Blake, Ray Hryb, Bill "Spaceman" Lee	
M A R C H	7	Queen of the Ring	Sumerian Pictures / Intrinsic Value Films	Ash Avildsen (director/screenplay); Emily Bett Rickards, Kelli Berglund, Walton Goggins, Josh Lucas	
M A R C H	7	Rule Breakers	Angel Studios	Bill Guttentag (director/screenplay); Jason Brown, Elaha Mahboob (screenplay); Nikohl Boosheri, Noorin Gulamgaus, Amber Afzali, Nina Hosseinzadeh, Sara Malal Rowe, Mariam Saraj, Nasser Memarzia, Ali Fazal	
M A R C H	7	Bloat	Lionsgate	Pablo Absento (director/screenplay); Ben McKenzie, Bojana Novakovic, Malcolm Fuller, Sawyer Jones, Kane Kosugi	
M A R C H	13	The Parenting	Max / Warner Bros. Pictures / New Line Cinema	Craig Johnson (director); Kent Sublette (screenplay); Nik Dodani, Brandon Flynn, Parker Posey, Vivian Bang, Lisa Kudrow, Dean Norris, Brian Cox, Edie Falco	
M A R C H	13	Control Freak	Hulu	Shal Ngo (director/screenplay); Kelly Marie Tran, Callie Johnson, Miles Robbins, Kieu Chinh, Zack Gold, Scott Takeda	
M A R C H	14	Black Bag	Focus Features	Steven Soderbergh (director); David Koepp (screenplay); Cate Blanchett, Michael Fassbender, Marisa Abela, Tom Burke, Naomie Harris, Regé-Jean Page, Pierce Brosnan	
M A R C H	14	Novocaine	Paramount Pictures / Infrared Pictures	Dan Berk, Robert Olsen (directors); Lars Jacobson (screenplay); Jack Quaid, Amber Midthunder, Ray Nicholson, Betty Gabriel, Jacob Batalon	
M A R C H	14	Opus	A24	Mark Anthony Green (director/screenplay); Ayo Edebiri, John Malkovich, Juliette Lewis, Murray Bartlett, Amber Midthunder, Young Mazino, Stephanie Suganami, Tatanka Means, Tony Hale	
M A R C H	14	The Actor	Neon	Duke Johnson (director/screenplay); Stephen Cooney (screenplay); André Holland, Gemma Chan, May Calamawy, Asim Chaudhry, Joe Cole, Fabien Frankel, Olwen Fouéré, Edward Hogg, Toby Jones, Youssef Kerkour, Simon McBurney, Tanya Reynolds, Tracey Ullman, Scott Alexander Young	
M A R C H	14	Borderline	Magnet Releasing / LuckyChap Entertainment	Jimmy Warden (director/screenplay); Samara Weaving, Ray Nicholson, Jimmie Fails, Alba Baptista, Eric Dane	
M A R C H	14	The World Will Tremble	Vertical	Lior Geller (director/screenplay); Oliver Jackson-Cohen, Jeremy Neumark Jones, Anton Lesser, David Kross, Michael Fox	
M A R C H	14	High Rollers	Saban Films	Ives (director); Chris Sivertson (screenplay); John Travolta, Gina Gershon, Lukas Haas, Quavo, Joel Cohen	
M A R C H	14	The Last Supper	Pinnacle Peak Pictures / Canyon Productions	Mauro Borrelli (director/screenplay); John Collins (screenplay); Jamie Ward, James Faulkner, Nathalie Rapti Gomex	
M A R C H	18	Batman Ninja vs. Yakuza League	Warner Bros. Home Entertainment / DC Entertainment / Warner Bros. Animation	Junpei Mizusaki, Shinji Takagi (directors); Kazuki Nakashima (screenplay); Joe Daniels, Nathan Wilson, David Harbold, Karlii Hoch, Molly Searcy, Cyrus Rodas, Annie Wild, John Swasey, Aaron Campbell	
M A R C H	20	O'Dessa	Hulu / Searchlight Pictures	Geremy Jasper (director/screenplay); Sadie Sink, Kelvin Harrison Jr., Murray Bartlett, Regina Hall	
M A R C H	20	Duplicity	Amazon MGM Studios / Tyler Perry Studios	Tyler Perry (director/screenplay); Kat Graham, Meagan Tandy, Tyler Lepley, RonRecao Lee	
M A R C H	21	Snow White	Walt Disney Pictures / Marc Platt Productions	Marc Webb (director); Erin Cressida Wilson (screenplay); Rachel Zegler, Andrew Burnap, Gal Gadot	
M A R C H	21	The Alto Knights	Warner Bros. Pictures / Winkler Films	Barry Levinson (director); Nicholas Pileggi (screenplay); Robert De Niro, Debra Messing, Cosmo Jarvis, Kathrine Narducci, Michael Rispoli	
M A R C H	21	Ash	RLJE Films / Shudder / XYZ Films / IPR.VC	Flying Lotus (director); Jonni Remmler (screenplay); Eiza González, Aaron Paul, Iko Uwais, Beulah Koale, Kate Elliott, Flying Lotus	
M A R C H	21	The Assessment	Magnolia Pictures / Number 9 Films	Fleur Fortuné (director); Dave Thomas, Nell Garfath-Cox, John Donnelly (screenplay); Elizabeth Olsen, Alicia Vikander, Himesh Patel, Indira Varma, Nicholas Pinnock, Charlotte Ritchie, Leah Harvey, Minnie Driver	
M A R C H	21	Bob Trevino Likes It	Roadside Attractions	Tracie Laymon (director/screenplay); Barbie Ferreira, John Leguizamo, French Stewart, Rachel Bay Jones	
M A R C H	21	Magazine Dreams	Briarcliff Entertainment / Los Angeles Media Fund	Elijah Bynum (director/screenplay); Jonathan Majors, Haley Bennett, Taylour Paige, Mike O'Hearn, Harrison Page, Harriet Sansom Harris	
M A R C H	21	Locked	The Avenue / ZQ Entertainment / Raimi Productions / Arcana Studio	David Yarovesky (director); Michael Arlen Ross (screenplay); Bill Skarsgård, Anthony Hopkins	
M A R C H	21	McVeigh	Decal	Mike Ott (director/screenplay); Alex Gioulakis (screenplay); Alfie Allen, Brett Gelman, Ashley Benson, Anthony Carrigan, Tracy Letts, Isolda Dychauk	
M A R C H	21	Baby Invasion	EDGLRD / Picture Perfect	Harmony Korine (director/screenplay); Juan Bofill, Shawn Thomas, Steven Rodriguez, Antonio Jackson, Tej Limlas Ly	
M A R C H	21	Popeye the Slayer Man	Vantage Media	Robert Michael Ryan (director); John Doolan (screenplay); Jason Robert Stephens, Sarah Nicklin, Angela Relucio, Scott Swope, Mabel Thomas	
M A R C H	21	Appalachian Dog	Buffalo 8 Distribution / C.H. Squared Films	Colin Henning (director/screenplay); Georgia Morgan, Hayleigh Hart Franklin, Brooke Elizabeth, Colin Henning	
M A R C H	25	To Die Alone	One Tree Entertainment / Charming Stranger Films	Austin Smagalski (director/screenplay); Lisa Jacqueline Starrett, James Tang, Presley-Belle Foster	
M A R C H	27	Holland	Amazon MGM Studios / Blossom Films	Mimi Cave (director); Andrew Sodorski (screenplay); Nicole Kidman, Matthew Macfadyen, Jude Hill, Gael García Bernal	
M A R C H	28	A Working Man	Metro-Goldwyn-Mayer / Black Bear Pictures / Balboa Productions / Cedar Park Entertainment / Punch Palace Productions	David Ayer (director/screenplay); Sylvester Stallone (screenplay); Jason Statham, Jason Flemyng, Merab Ninidze, Maximilian Osinski, Cokey Falkow, Michael Peña, David Harbour	
M A R C H	28	The Woman in the Yard	Universal Pictures / Blumhouse Productions	Jaume Collet-Serra (director); Sam Stefanak (screenplay); Danielle Deadwyler, Okwui Okpokwasili, Russell Hornsby	
M A R C H	28	Death of a Unicorn	A24 / Ley Line Entertainment	Alex Scharfman (director/screenplay); Paul Rudd, Jenna Ortega, Will Poulter, Téa Leoni, Richard E. Grant	
M A R C H	28	Alexander and the Terrible, Horrible, No Good, Very Bad Road Trip	Disney+ / Walt Disney Pictures / 21 Laps Entertainment / The Jim Henson Company	Marvin Lemus (director); Matt Lopez (screenplay); Eva Longoria, Jesse Garcia, Paulina Chávez, Rose Portillo, Thom Nemer, Cheech Marin	
M A R C H	28	The Friend	Bleecker Street	Scott McGehee and David Siegel (directors/screenplay); Naomi Watts, Bill Murray, Sarah Pidgeon, Constance Wu, Ann Dowd, Noma Dumezweni, Felix Solis, Owen Teague, Carla Gugino	
M A R C H	28	The Life List	Netflix	Adam Brooks (director/screenplay); Sofia Carson, Sebastian de Souza, Connie Britton, Kyle Allen	
M A R C H	28	Day of Reckoning	ESX Films	Shaun Silva (director); Travis J. Opgenorth (screenplay); Billy Zane, Zach Roerig, Cara Jade Myers, Scott Adkins, Trace Adkins	
M A R C H	28	Black Heat	Dark Star Pictures / BLacklight	Wes Miller (director/screenplay); Jason Mitchell, DreamDoll, NLE Choppa	
M A R C H	31	Sew Torn	Vertigo Releasing	Freddy Macdonald (director/screenplay); Fred Macdonald (screenplay); Eve Connolly, Calum Worthy, John Lynch, K. Callan, Ron Cook, Thomas Douglas, Caroline Goodall	

== April–June ==
Opening		Title	Production company	Cast and crew	Ref.
A P R I L	2	Screamboat	Iconic Events Releasing	Steven LaMorte (director/screenplay); Matthew Garcia-Dunn (screenplay); David Howard Thornton, Allison Pittel, Amy Schmacher, Jesse Posey, Kailey Hyman, Jesse Kove, Jarlath Conroy	
A P R I L	4	A Minecraft Movie	Warner Bros. Pictures / Legendary Entertainment / Mojang Studios / Vertigo Entertainment	Jared Hess (director); Chris Bowman, Hubbel Palmer, Neil Widener, Gavin James, Chris Galletta (screenplay); Jason Momoa, Jack Black, Danielle Brooks, Emma Myers, Sebastian Eugene Hansen, Jennifer Coolidge	
A P R I L	4	Freaky Tales	Lionsgate / Entertainment One	Anna Boden, Ryan Fleck (directors/screenplay); Pedro Pascal, Ben Mendelsohn, Jay Ellis, Normani, Dominique Thorne, Jack Champion, Ji-young Yoo, Angus Cloud, Tom Hanks	
A P R I L	4	Hell of a Summer	Neon / 30West / Aggregate Films	Billy Bryk, Finn Wolfhard (directors/screenplay); Fred Hechinger, Abby Quinn, D'Pharaoh Woon-A-Tai, Billy Bryk, Finn Wolfhard, Pardis Saremi, Rosebud Baker, Adam Pally	
A P R I L	4	The Luckiest Man in America	IFC Films / Sapan Studio	Samir Oliveros (director/screenplay); Maggie Briggs (screenplay); Paul Walter Hauser, Walton Goggins, Shamier Anderson, Brian Geraghty, Patti Harrison, Haley Bennett, Damian Young, Lilli Kay, James Wolk, Shaunette Renée Wilson, David Rysdahl, Ricky Russert, David Strathairn, Johnny Knoxville, Maisie Williams	
A P R I L	4	Eric Larue	Magnolia Pictures	Michael Shannon (director); Brett Neveu (screenplay); Judy Greer, Paul Sparks, Alison Pill, Annie Parisse, Kate Arrington, Tracy Letts, Nation Sage Henrikson, Alexander Skarsgård	
A P R I L	4	Psycho Therapy: The Shallow Tale of a Writer Who Decided to Write About a Serial Killer	Brainstorm Media	Tolga Karaçelik (director/screenplay); Steve Buscemi, Britt Lower, John Magaro	
A P R I L	4	A Nice Indian Boy	Blue Harbor Entertainment	Roshan Sethi (director); Eric Randall (screenplay); Karan Soni, Jonathan Groff, Sunita Mani, Zarna Garg, Harish Patel	
A P R I L	4	Gazer	Metrograph Pictures	Ryan J. Sloan (director/screenplay); Ariella Mastroianni (screenplay); Ariella Mastroianni, Marcia Debonis, Renee Gagner, Jack Alberts, Tommy Kang	
A P R I L	4	825 Forest Road	Falcon Films / Shudder	Stephen Cognetti (director/screenplay); Elizabeth Vermilyea, Kathryn Miller, Joe Bandelli, Joe Falcone, Madeleine Garcia, Brian Anthony Wilson	
A P R I L	4	V13	Deskpop Entertainment / Footnote Four / Vienna 1913 Productions	Richard Ledes (director/screenplay); Alain-Didier Weill (screenplay); Alan Cumming, Samuel H. Levine, Liam Aiken	
A P R I L	10	G20	Amazon MGM Studios / JuVee Productions / Mad Chance Productions / MRC	Patricia Riggen (director); Caitlin Parrish, Erica Weiss, Logan Miller, Noah Miller (screenplay); Viola Davis, Anthony Anderson, Marsai Martin, Ramón Rodríguez, Douglas Hodge, Elizabeth Marvel, Sabrina Impacciatore, Clark Gregg, Antony Starr	
A P R I L	11	The Amateur	20th Century Studios	James Hawes (director); Ken Nolan, Gary Spinelli (screenplay); Rami Malek, Rachel Brosnahan, Caitríona Balfe, Michael Stuhlbarg, Holt McCallany, Julianne Nicholson, Jon Bernthal, Laurence Fishburne	
A P R I L	11	The King of Kings	Angel Studios / Mofac Animation	Seong-ho Jang (director/screenplay); Kenneth Branagh, Uma Thurman, Mark Hamill, Pierce Brosnan, Roman Griffin Davis, Forest Whitaker, Ben Kingsley, Oscar Isaac	
A P R I L	11	Drop	Universal Pictures / Blumhouse Productions / Platinum Dunes	Christopher Landon (director); Jillian Jacobs, Chris Roach (screenplay); Meghann Fahy, Brandon Sklenar, Violett Beane, Jeffery Self	
A P R I L	11	Warfare	A24 / DNA Films	Ray Mendoza, Alex Garland (directors/screenplay); D'Pharaoh Woon-A-Tai, Will Poulter, Cosmo Jarvis, Kit Connor, Finn Bennett, Taylor John Smith, Michael Gandolfini, Adain Bradley, Noah Centineo, Evan Holtzman, Henrique Zaga, Joseph Quinn, Charles Melton	
A P R I L	11	Gunslingers	Lionsgate / Grindstone Entertainment Group	Brian Skiba (director/screenplay); Nicolas Cage, Stephen Dorff, Heather Graham, Scarlet Rose Stallone, Tzi Ma, Costas Mandylor, Cooper Barnes, Bre Blair	
A P R I L	11	Sacramento	Vertical	Michael Angarano (director/screenplay); Chris Smith (screenplay); Michael Angarano, Michael Cera, Kristen Stewart, Maya Erskine, AJ Mendez, Iman Karram, Rosalind Chao	
A P R I L	11	Home Sweet Home Rebirth	Vertical / Yggdrazil Group	Alexander Kiesl, Steffen Hacker (directors); Michele Morrone, William Moseley, Urassaya Sperbund, Alexander Lee	
A P R I L	11	The Uninvited	Foton Distribution / Foton Pictures / Rosebud Pictures	Nadia Conners (director/screenplay); Walton Goggins, Elizabeth Reaser, Rufus Sewell, Pedro Pascal, Eva De Dominici, Lois Smith	
A P R I L	11	Zero	Well Go USA Entertainment	Jean Luc Herbulot (director/screenplay); Hus Miller, Cam McHarg, Gary Dourdan, Roger Sallah, Moran Rosenblatt, Willem Dafoe	
A P R I L	11	The Big Bend	Onion Creek Productions / Wagnervision	Brett Wagner (director/screenplay); Jason Butler Harner, Virginia Kull, Erica Ash, David Sullivan, Nick Masciangelo	
A P R I L	15	Dreaming of You	Freestyle Digital Media	Jack McCafferty (director/screenplay); Jack McCafferty, Lauren LaVera, Ian Ross, Jake Westphal, Katie Marovitch, Liz Priestly, Kevin Giles	
A P R I L	18	Sinners	Warner Bros. Pictures / Proximity Media	Ryan Coogler (director/screenplay); Michael B. Jordan, Hailee Steinfeld, Miles Caton, Jack O'Connell, Wunmi Mosaku, Jayme Lawson, Omar Benson Miller, Buddy Guy, Delroy Lindo	
A P R I L	18	Sneaks	Briarcliff Entertainment / Cinema Gypsy Productions / Assemblage Entertainment / GFM Animation	Rob Edwards (director/screenplay); Chris Jenkins (director); Anthony Mackie, Martin Lawrence, Swae Lee, Chloe Bailey, Macy Gray, Ella Mai, Mustard, Roddy Ricch, Quavo, Young Miko, Amirah Hall, Kiana Ledé, Bobbito Garcia, Sam Jay, Sky Brown, Rayssa Leal, Rico Rodriguez, Keith David, Chris Paul, Laurence Fishburne	
A P R I L	18	The Legend of Ochi	A24 / AGBO	Isaiah Saxon (director/screenplay); Helena Zengel, Finn Wolfhard, Emily Watson, Willem Dafoe	
A P R I L	18	The Wedding Banquet	Bleecker Street / ShivHans Pictures	Andrew Ahn (director/screenplay); James Schamus (screenplay); Bowen Yang, Lily Gladstone, Kelly Marie Tran, Han Gi-chan, Joan Chen, Youn Yuh-jung	
A P R I L	25	The Accountant 2	Metro-Goldwyn-Mayer / Artists Equity	Gavin O'Connor (director); Bill Dubuque (screenplay); Ben Affleck, Jon Bernthal, Cynthia Addai-Robinson, Daniella Pineda, Allison Robertson, J. K. Simmons	
A P R I L	25	Until Dawn	Screen Gems / PlayStation Productions / Vertigo Entertainment	David F. Sandberg (director); Blair Butler, Gary Dauberman (screenplay); Ella Rubin, Michael Cimino, Odessa A'zion, Ji-young Yoo, Belmont Cameli, Maia Mitchell, Peter Stormare	
A P R I L	25	Havoc	Netflix / XYZ Films	Gareth Evans (director/screenplay); Tom Hardy, Jessie Mei Li, Justin Cornwell, Quelin Sepulveda, Luis Guzmán, Yeo Yann Yann, Timothy Olyphant, Forest Whitaker	
A P R I L	25	On Swift Horses	Sony Pictures Classics / Ley Line Entertainment	Daniel Minahan (director); Bryce Kass (screenplay); Daisy Edgar-Jones, Jacob Elordi, Will Poulter, Diego Calva, Sasha Calle	
A P R I L	25	Winter Spring Summer or Fall	Republic Pictures / Motion Picture Corporation of America	Tiffany Paulsen (director); Dan Schoffer (screenplay); Jenna Ortega, Percy Hynes White, Marisol Nichols, Adam Rodriguez	
A P R I L	25	Neighborhood Watch	RLJE Films	Duncan Skiles (director); Sean Farley (screenplay); Jeffrey Dean Morgan, Jack Quaid, Malin Akerman	
A P R I L	25	Magic Farm	Mubi / Tango Entertainment / Icki Eneo Arlo	Amalia Ulman (director/screenplay); Chloë Sevigny, Alex Wolff, Amalia Ulman, Joe Apollonio, Simon Rex	
A P R I L	25	California King	Vertical	Eli Stern (director/screenplay); Jimmy Tatro, Travis Bennett, Victoria Justice, Cooper Sutton, Joel McHale	
A P R I L	29	Project MKHEXE	Cineverse	Gerald Robert Waddell (director/screenplay); Ignacyo Matynia, Jordan Knapp, Will Jandro, Jennifer Lynn O'Hara, Dwayne Tarver	
M A Y	1	Another Simple Favor	Amazon MGM Studios / Lionsgate / Feigco Entertainment	Paul Feig (director); Eric Pearson, Jessica Sharzer, Laeta Kalogridis (screenplay); Anna Kendrick, Blake Lively, Andrew Rannells, Bashir Salahuddin, Elizabeth Perkins, Michele Morrone, Elena Sofia Ricci, Alex Newell, Henry Golding, Allison Janney	
M A Y	2	Thunderbolts*	Marvel Studios	Jake Schreier (director); Eric Pearson, Joanna Calo (screenplay); Florence Pugh, Sebastian Stan, Wyatt Russell, Olga Kurylenko, Lewis Pullman, Geraldine Viswanathan, Chris Bauer, Wendell Pierce, David Harbour, Hannah John-Kamen, Julia Louis-Dreyfus	
M A Y	2	Pavements	Utopia	Alex Ross Perry (director/screenplay); Pavement, Zoe Lister-Jones, Michael Esper, Kathryn Gallagher, Joe Keery, Jason Schwartzman, Nat Wolff, Fred Hechinger, Logan Miller, Griffin Newman, Tim Heidecker	
M A Y	2	Words of War	Decal	James Strong (director); Eric Poppen (screenplay); Maxine Peake, Jason Isaacs, Ciarán Hinds, Ellie Bamber, Harry Lawtey, Naomi Battrick	
M A Y	2	I'm Beginning to See the Light	Gravitas Ventures	Konstantin Khudyakov (director/screenplay); Mark Bacci (screenplay); Jack Huston, Abby Cornish, Brandon T. Jackson, Jamie Chung	
M A Y	2	Rosario	Variance Films	Felipe Vargas (director); Alan Trezza (screenplay); David Dastmalchian, José Zúñiga, Diana Lein, Paul Ben-Victor, Emeraude Toubia	
M A Y	2	Rust	Falling Forward Films	Joel Souza (director/screenplay); Alec Baldwin, Josh Hopkins, Patrick Scott McDermott, Frances Fisher, Travis Fimmel	
M A Y	2	Vulcanizadora	Oscilloscope / Factory 25	Joel Potrykus (director/screenplay); Joel Potrykus, Joshua Burge, Bill Vincent, Solo Potrykus	
M A Y	2	Electra	Level 33 Entertainment	Hala Matar (director/screenplay); Daryl Wein (screenplay); Maria Bakalova, Abigail Cowen, Jack Farthing, Daryl Wein	
M A Y	2	The Death of Snow White	Atlas Distribution / The Horror Collective	Jason Brooks (director/screenplay); Naomi Mechem-Miller (screenplay); Sanae Loutsis, Chelsea Edmundson, Tristan Nokes, Meredith Binder, Risa Mei, Jeremy Hallum, Ali Chapman, Colin Miller<, Dillon Moore, Michael DeSanto II, Eric Pope	
M A Y	6	Broke	Sony Pictures Home Entertainment / Wild West Picture Show Productions	Carlyle Eubank (director/screenplay); Wyatt Russell, Dennis Quaid, Auden Thornton, Mary McDonnell, Johnny Berchtold, Tom Skerritt	
M A Y	9	Shadow Force	Lionsgate / Simpson Street / Indian Meadows Productions	Joe Carnahan (director/screenplay); Leon Chills (screenplay); Kerry Washington, Omar Sy, Mark Strong, Da'Vine Joy Randolph, Cliff "Method Man" Smith	
M A Y	9	Fight or Flight	Vertical / Asbury Park Productions	James Madigan (director); Brooks McLaren, D. J. Cotrona (screenplay); Josh Hartnett, Charithra Chandran, Julian Kostov, Katee Sackhoff, Marko Zaror	
M A Y	9	Friendship	A24 / Fifth Season / BoulderLight Pictures	Andrew DeYoung (director/screenplay); Tim Robinson, Kate Mara, Jack Dylan Grazer, Paul Rudd	
M A Y	9	Nonnas	Netflix / Fifth Season / Madison Wells / Matador Content	Stephen Chbosky (director); Liz Maccie (screenplay); Vince Vaughn, Lorraine Bracco, Talia Shire, Brenda Vaccaro, Joe Manganiello, Linda Cardellini, Susan Sarandon	
M A Y	9	Clown in a Cornfield	Screamtime Films / Magnet Releasing	Eli Craig (director/screenplay); Carter Blanchard (screenplay); Katie Douglas, Carson MacCormac, Aaron Abrams, Will Sasso, Kevin Durand	
M A Y	9	Juliet & Romeo	Briarcliff Entertainment	Timothy Scott Bogart (director/screenplay); Clara Rugaard, Jamie Ward, Jason Isaacs, Tayla Parx, Dan Fogler, Nicholas Podany, Ferdia Walsh-Peelo, Rupert Graves, Rebel Wilson, Rupert Everett, Derek Jacobi	
M A Y	9	Unit 234	Brainstorm Media	Andy Tennant (director); Derek Steiner (screenplay); Don Johnson, Isabelle Fuhrman, Jack Huston	
M A Y	9	Summer of 69	Hulu / American High	Jillian Bell (director/screenplay); Liz Nico, Jules Byrne (screenplay); Chloe Fineman, Sam Morelos, Matt Cornett	
M A Y	9	Absolute Dominion	Giant Pictures	Lexi Alexander (director/screenplay); Désiré Mia, Fabiano Viett, Alex Winter, Patton Oswalt, Julie Ann Emery, Andy Allo, Alok Vaid-Menon	
M A Y	9	Lilly	Blue Harbor Entertainment / Artemis Rising Foundation	Rachel Feldman (director/screenplay); Adam Prince (screenplay); Patricia Clarkson, John Benjamin Hickey, Thomas Sadoski	
M A Y	16	Final Destination Bloodlines	Warner Bros. Pictures / New Line Cinema	Zach Lipovsky, Adam Stein (directors); Guy Busick, Lori Evans Taylor (screenplay); Kaitlyn Santa Juana, Teo Briones, Richard Harmon, Owen Patrick Joyner, Rya Kihlstedt, Anna Lore, Brec Bassinger, Tony Todd	
M A Y	16	Hurry Up Tomorrow	Lionsgate / Live Nation Productions	Trey Edward Shults (director/screenplay); Abel Tesfaye, Reza Fahim (screenplay); Abel Tesfaye, Jenna Ortega, Barry Keoghan	
M A Y	16	A Breed Apart	Lionsgate	Griff Furst, Nathan Furst (directors/screenplay); Grace Caroline Currey, Virginia Gardner, Riele Downs, Zak Steiner, Page Kennedy, Joey Bragg, Troy Gentile, Hayden Panettiere	
M A Y	16	To Live and Die and Live	Samuel Goldwyn Films	Qasim Basir (director/screenplay); Amin Joseph, Skye P. Marshall, Omari Hardwick, Cory Hardrict, Maryam Basir, Dana Gourrier, Travina Springer	
M A Y	16	The Ruse	Mena Films	Stevan Mena (director/screenplay); Veronica Cartwright, Madelyn Dundon, Michael Bakkensen, Nicola Silber, T.C. Carter, Kayleigh Ruller, Michael Steger	
M A Y	23	Lilo & Stitch	Walt Disney Pictures / Rideback	Dean Fleischer Camp (director); Chris Kekaniokalani Bright, Mike Van Waes (screenplay); Sydney Elizebeth Agudong, Billy Magnussen, Hannah Waddingham, Chris Sanders, Courtney B. Vance, Zach Galifianakis, Maia Kealoha	
M A Y	23	Mission: Impossible – The Final Reckoning	Paramount Pictures / Skydance Media / TC Productions	Christopher McQuarrie (director/screenplay); Erik Jendresen (screenplay); Tom Cruise, Hayley Atwell, Ving Rhames, Simon Pegg, Esai Morales, Pom Klementieff, Henry Czerny, Holt McCallany, Janet McTeer, Nick Offerman, Hannah Waddingham, Tramell Tillman, Angela Bassett	
M A Y	23	Fountain of Youth	Apple TV+ / Apple Studios / Skydance Media / Radio Silence Productions	Guy Ritchie (director); James Vanderbilt (screenplay); John Krasinski, Natalie Portman, Eiza González, Domhnall Gleeson, Arian Moayed, Laz Alonso, Carmen Ejogo, Stanley Tucci	
M A Y	23	Fear Street: Prom Queen	Netflix / Chernin Entertainment	Matt Palmer (director/screenplay); Donald McLeary (screenplay); India Fowler, Suzanna Son, Fina Strazza, David Iacono, Ella Rubin, Chris Klein, Ariana Greenblatt, Lili Taylor, Katherine Waterston	
M A Y	23	The Last Rodeo	Angel Studios	Jon Avnet (director/screenplay); Neal McDonough, Derek Presley (screenplay); Neal McDonough, Mykelti Williamson, Christopher McDonald, Sarah Jones, Daylon Swearingen	
M A Y	23	Bad Shabbos	Menemsha Films / Carnegie Hill Entertainment	Daniel Robbins (director/screenplay); Zack Weiner (screenplay); Kyra Sedgwick, Method Man, Jon Bass, Milana Vayntrub	
M A Y	23	The Surrender	Shudder	Julia Max (director/screenplay); Colby Minifie, Kate Burton, Neil Sandilands	
M A Y	30	Karate Kid: Legends	Columbia Pictures	Jonathan Entwistle (director); Rob Lieber (screenplay); Jackie Chan, Ben Wang, Joshua Jackson, Sadie Stanley, Ming-Na Wen, Wyatt Oleff, Aramis Knight, Ralph Macchio	
M A Y	30	The Phoenician Scheme	Focus Features / Indian Paintbrush	Wes Anderson (director/screenplay); Roman Coppola (screenplay); Benicio del Toro, Mia Threapleton, Michael Cera, Riz Ahmed, Tom Hanks, Bryan Cranston, Mathieu Amalric, Richard Ayoade, Jeffrey Wright, Scarlett Johansson, Benedict Cumberbatch, Rupert Friend, Hope Davis	
M A Y	30	Tim Travers and the Time Traveler's Paradox	Disrupt Entertainment	Stimson Snead (director/screenplay); Samuel Dunning, Danny Trejo, Joel McHale, Keith David, Felicia Day	
M A Y	31	Mountainhead	HBO / Max / HBO Films	Jesse Armstrong (director/screenplay); Steve Carell, Jason Schwartzman, Cory Michael Smith, Ramy Youssef	
J U N E	6	Ballerina	Lionsgate / Summit Entertainment / Thunder Road Films / 87North Productions	Len Wiseman (director); Shay Hatten (screenplay); Ana de Armas, Anjelica Huston, Gabriel Byrne, Lance Reddick, Catalina Sandino Moreno, Norman Reedus, Ian McShane, Keanu Reeves	
J U N E	6	The Life of Chuck	Neon / Intrepid Pictures / FilmNation Entertainment	Mike Flanagan (director/screenplay); Tom Hiddleston, Chiwetel Ejiofor, Karen Gillan, Mia Sara, Carl Lumbly, Benjamin Pajak, Jacob Tremblay, Mark Hamill	
J U N E	6	Predator: Killer of Killers	Hulu / 20th Century Studios / Davis Entertainment / Lawrence Gordon Productions	Dan Trachtenberg (director); Micho Robert Rutare (screenplay); Lindsay LaVanchy, Louis Ozawa Changchien, Rick Gonzalez, Michael Biehn	
J U N E	6	Echo Valley	Apple TV+ / Apple Studios / Scott Free Productions	Michael Pearce (director); Brad Ingelsby (screenplay); Julianne Moore, Sydney Sweeney, Domhnall Gleeson, Kyle MacLachlan, Fiona Shaw	
J U N E	6	The Ritual	XYZ Films	David Midell (director/screenplay); Enrico Natale (screenplay); Al Pacino, Dan Stevens, Ashley Greene, Abigail Cowen, Patricia Heaton	
J U N E	6	Straw	Netflix / Tyler Perry Studios	Tyler Perry (director/screenplay); Taraji P. Henson, Sherri Shepherd, Teyana Taylor, Sinbad, Rockmond Dunbar, Glynn Turman	
J U N E	6	I Don't Understand You	Vertical / Pinky Promise	David Joseph Craig, Brian Crano (directors/screenplay); Nick Kroll, Andrew Rannells, Morgan Spector, Eleonora Romandini, Amanda Seyfried	
J U N E	6	Dangerous Animals	IFC Films / Shudder / LD Entertainment / Brouhaha Entertainment	Sean Byrne (director); Nick Lepard (screenplay); Hassie Harrison, Josh Heuston, Rob Carlton, Ella Newton, Liam Greinke, Jai Courtney	
J U N E	13	How to Train Your Dragon	Universal Pictures / DreamWorks Animation / Marc Platt Productions	Dean DeBlois (director/screenplay); Mason Thames, Nico Parker, Gabriel Howell, Julian Dennison, Bronwyn James, Harry Trevaldwyn, Peter Serafinowicz, Nick Frost, Gerard Butler	
J U N E	13	Materialists	A24 / 2AM / Killer Films	Celine Song (director/screenplay); Dakota Johnson, Chris Evans, Zoë Winters, Marin Ireland, Louisa Jacobson, Pedro Pascal	
J U N E	13	Diablo	Lionsgate / Grindstone Entertainment Group	Ernesto Díaz Espinoza (director); Mat Sansom (screenplay); Scott Adkins, Marko Zaror, Alana De La Rossa, Diana Hoyos	
J U N E	13	The Unholy Trinity	Saban Films / Roadside Attractions	Richard Gray (director); Lee Zachariah (screenplay); Pierce Brosnan, Samuel L. Jackson, Brandon Lessard, David Arquette, Veronica Ferres, Tim Daly, Ethan Peck, Q'orianka Kilcher	
J U N E	13	Tatami	XYZ Films / Maven Screen Media	Guy Nattiv, Zar Amir Ebrahimi (directors); Elham Erfani, Guy Nattiv (screenplay); Arienne Mandi, Zar Amir Ebrahimi, Jaime Ray Newman, Nadine Marshall	.
J U N E	20	Elio	Walt Disney Pictures / Pixar Animation Studios	Madeline Sharafian, Domee Shi, Adrian Molina (directors); Julia Cho, Mark Hammer, Mike Jones (screenplay); Yonas Kibreab, Zoe Saldaña, Remy Edgerly, Brandon Moon, Brad Garrett, Jameela Jamil	
J U N E	20	28 Years Later	Columbia Pictures / DNA Films	Danny Boyle (director); Alex Garland (screenplay); Jodie Comer, Aaron Taylor-Johnson, Alfie Williams, Jack O'Connell, Edvin Ryding, Chi Lewis-Parry, Ralph Fiennes	
J U N E	20	KPop Demon Hunters	Netflix / Sony Pictures Animation	Maggie Kang, Chris Appelhans (directors/screenplay); Hannah McMechan, Danya Jimenez (screenplay); Arden Cho, Ahn Hyo-seop, May Hong, Ji-young Yoo, Yunjin Kim, Daniel Dae Kim, Ken Jeong, Lee Byung-hun	
J U N E	20	Everything's Going to Be Great	Lionsgate / Entertainment One	Jon S. Baird (director); Steven Rogers (screenplay); Benjamin Evan Ainsworth, Bryan Cranston, Allison Janney, Jack Champion, Simon Rex, Chris Cooper	
J U N E	20	Bride Hard	Magenta Light Studios	Simon West (director); Shaina Steinberg (screenplay); Rebel Wilson, Anna Camp, Anna Chlumsky, Da'Vine Joy Randolph, Gigi Zumbado, Stephen Dorff, Justin Hartley	
J U N E	20	Eye for an Eye	Vertical / Ley Line Entertainment	Colin Tilley (director); Elisa Victoria, Michael Tully (screenplay); Whitney Peak, S. Epatha Merkerson, Golda Rosheuvel, Finn Bennett, Laken Giles	
J U N E	20	Familiar Touch	Music Box Films	Sarah Friedland (director/screenplay); Kathleen Chalfant, Carolyn Michelle Smith, Andy McQueen, H. Jon Benjamin	
J U N E	20	Alma and the Wolf	Republic Pictures	Michael Patrick Jann (director); Abigail Miller (screenplay); Ethan Embry, Li Jun Li, Jeremie Harris, Kevin Allison, Mather Zickel, Beth Malone	
J U N E	20	The Harvest	Freestyle Digital Media	Caylee So (director); Doua Moua (screenplay); Doua Moua, Perry Yung, Dawn Ying Yuen, Chrisna Chhor, Lucas Velazquez, Arianna Rivas	
J U N E	20	Don't Tell Larry	Level 33 Entertainment	Greg Porper, John Schimke (directors/screenplay); Ed Begley Jr., Dot-Marie Jones, Patty Guggenheim, Kenneth Mosley, Kiel Kennedy	
J U N E	27	F1	Warner Bros. Pictures / Apple Studios / Jerry Bruckheimer Films / Plan B Entertainment	Joseph Kosinski (director); Ehren Kruger (screenplay); Brad Pitt, Damson Idris, Kerry Condon, Tobias Menzies, Kim Bodnia, Sarah Niles, Shea Whigham, Javier Bardem	
J U N E	27	M3GAN 2.0	Universal Pictures / Blumhouse Productions / Atomic Monster	Gerard Johnstone (director/screenplay); Allison Williams, Violet McGraw, Brian Jordan Alvarez, Jen Van Epps, Amie Donald, Jenna Davis, Aristotle Athari, Timm Sharp, Ivanna Sakhno, Jemaine Clement	
J U N E	27	Sorry, Baby	A24 / Tango Entertainment / Big Beach	Eva Victor (director/screenplay); Eva Victor, Naomi Ackie, Louis Cancelmi, Kelly McCormack, Lucas Hedges, John Carroll Lynch	
J U N E	27	Off the Grid	Lionsgate	Johnny Martin (director); Jim Agnew (screenplay); Josh Duhamel, Greg Kinnear, María Elisa Camargo, Michael Zapesotsky, Ana Golja, Michael Papajohn, Peter Stormare	
J U N E	27	Ice Road: Vengeance	Vertical	Jonathan Hensleigh (director/screenplay); Liam Neeson, Fan Bingbing, Bernard Curry, Geoff Morrell	
J U N E	27	Ponyboi	Fox Entertainment Studios / Gathr	Esteban Arango (director); River Gallo (screenplay); River Gallo, Dylan O'Brien, Victoria Pedretti, Murray Bartlett, Indya Moore	
J U N E	27	Please Don't Feed the Children	Tubi	Destry Allyn Spielberg (director); Paul Bertino (screenplay); Michelle Dockery, Regan Aliyah, Zoe Colletti, Andrew Liner, Joshuah Melnick, Emma Meisel, Dean Scott Vazquez, Giancarlo Esposito	
J U N E	27	Stealing Pulp Fiction	Giant Pictures	Danny Turkiewicz (director/screenplay); Jon Rudnitsky, Cazzie David, Karan Soni, Taylor Hill, Oliver Cooper, Jason Alexander	
J U N E	27	The Sound	Blue Harbor Entertainment	Brendan Devane (director/screenplay); William Fichtner, Marc Hills, Jocelyn Hudon, David Clennon, Christina Kirkman, Kyle Gass	

== July–September ==
Opening		Title	Production company	Cast and crew	Ref.
J U L Y	2	Jurassic World Rebirth	Universal Pictures / Amblin Entertainment	Gareth Edwards (director); David Koepp (screenplay); Scarlett Johansson, Mahershala Ali, Jonathan Bailey, Rupert Friend, Manuel Garcia-Rulfo, Ed Skrein	
J U L Y	2	The Old Guard 2	Netflix / Skydance Media / Denver and Delilah Productions	Victoria Mahoney (director); Greg Rucka (screenplay); Charlize Theron, KiKi Layne, Matthias Schoenaerts, Marwan Kenzari, Luca Marinelli, Vân Veronica Ngô, Henry Golding, Uma Thurman, Chiwetel Ejiofor	
J U L Y	2	Heads of State	Amazon MGM Studios / The Safran Company	Ilya Naishuller (director); Josh Appelbaum, André Nemec, Harrison Query (screenplay); Idris Elba, John Cena, Priyanka Chopra, Jack Quaid, Paddy Considine, Stephen Root, Carla Gugino	
J U L Y	2	Dora and the Search for Sol Dorado	Paramount+ / Nickelodeon Movies	Alberto Belli (director); JT Billings (screenplay); Samantha Lorraine, Jacob Rodriguez, Daniella Pineda, Gabriel Iglesias	
J U L Y	3	Long Distance	Hulu / DreamWorks Pictures / Reliance Entertainment	Will Speck, Josh Gordon (directors); Spenser Cohen (screenplay); Anthony Ramos, Naomi Scott, Kristofer Hivju, Zachary Quinto	
J U L Y	4	Pretty Thing	Shout! Studios	Justin Kelly (director); Jack Donnelly (screenplay); Alicia Silverstone, Karl Glusman, Tammy Blanchard, Catherine Curtin	
J U L Y	10	Zombies 4: Dawn of the Vampires	Disney+ / Disney Channel	Paul Hoen (director); Josh A. Cagan, David Light, Joesph Raso (screenplay); Milo Manheim, Meg Donnelly, Chandler Kinney, Kylee Russell, Malachi Barton, Freya Skye	
J U L Y	11	Superman	Warner Bros. Pictures / DC Studios / The Safran Company	James Gunn (director/screenplay); David Corenswet, Rachel Brosnahan, Nicholas Hoult, Edi Gathegi, Anthony Carrigan, Nathan Fillion, Isabela Merced	
J U L Y	11	Madea's Destination Wedding	Netflix / Tyler Perry Studios	Tyler Perry (director/screenplay); Tyler Perry, Cassi Davis Patton, David Mann, Tamela Mann, Taja V. Simpson, Diamond White	
J U L Y	11	Sovereign	Briarcliff Entertainment	Christian Swegal (director/screenplay); Nick Offerman, Jacob Tremblay, Thomas Mann, Nancy Travis, Martha Plimpton, Dennis Quaid	
J U L Y	11	Skillhouse	Fathom Entertainment / GenTV	Josh Stolberg (director/screenplay); 50 Cent, Bryce Hall, Hannah Stocking, Neal McDonough, Paige VanZant	
J U L Y	11	Abraham's Boys	RLJE Films / Shudder	Natasha Kermani (director/screenplay); Titus Welliver, Jocelin Donahue, Judah Mackey, Aurora Perrineau, Brady Hepner	
J U L Y	18	I Know What You Did Last Summer	Columbia Pictures / Screen Gems / Original Film	Jennifer Kaytin Robinson (director/screenplay); Sam Lansky (screenplay); Madelyn Cline, Chase Sui Wonders, Jonah Hauer-King, Tyriq Withers, Sarah Pidgeon, Billy Campbell, Gabbriette Bechtel, Austin Nichols, Freddie Prinze Jr., Jennifer Love Hewitt	
J U L Y	18	Smurfs	Paramount Animation	Chris Miller (director); Pam Brady (screenplay); Rihanna, James Corden, Nick Offerman, J. P. Karliak, Daniel Levy, Amy Sedaris, Natasha Lyonne, Sandra Oh, Jimmy Kimmel, Octavia Spencer, Nick Kroll, Hannah Waddingham, Kurt Russell, John Goodman	
J U L Y	18	Eddington	A24	Ari Aster (director/screenplay); Joaquin Phoenix, Pedro Pascal, Luke Grimes, Deirdre O'Connell, Micheal Ward, Amélie Hoeferle, Clifton Collins Jr., William Belleau, Austin Butler, Emma Stone	
J U L Y	18	Atrabilious	Buffalo 8 / River Styx Productions	William Atticus Parker (director/screenplay); Leon Addison Brown, Whoopi Goldberg, Alec Baldwin, Jeffrey Wright, Mark Boone Junior, Lewis Black, Evan Jonigkeit, Joel de la Fuente, David Pittu	
J U L Y	18	Guns Up	Vertical / Millennium Media	Edward Drake (director/screenplay); Kevin James, Christina Ricci, Maximilian Osinski, Luis Guzmán, Melissa Leo	
J U L Y	18	Saint Clare	Quiver Distribution	Mitzi Peirone (director/screenplay); Guinevere Turner (screenplay); Bella Thorne, Rebecca De Mornay, Ryan Phillippe, Frank Whaley	
J U L Y	18	Guns & Moses	Concourse Media	Salvador Litvak (director/screenplay); Nina Davidovich Litvak (screenplay); Mark Feuerstein, Neal McDonough, Alona Tal, Dermot Mulroney, Jake Busey, Christopher Lloyd	
J U L Y	18	Unicorns	Cohen Media Group / Maven Screen Media / River Road Entertainment	James Krishna Floyd (director/screenplay); Sally El Hosaini (director); Ben Hardy, Jason Patel, Sagar Radia, Ali Afzal, Nisha Nayar, Val The Brown Queen	
J U L Y	18	No Sleep Till	Factory 25 / Willa	Alexandra Simpson (director/screenplay); Jordan Coley, Xavier Brown Sanders, Brynne Hofbauer, Taylor Benton	
J U L Y	24	Ick	Fathom Events	Joseph Kahn (director/screenplay); Dan Koontz, Samuel Laskey (screenplay); Brandon Routh, Malina Weissman, Jeff Fahey, Mena Suvari	
J U L Y	25	The Fantastic Four: First Steps	Marvel Studios	Matt Shakman (director); Josh Friedman, Eric Pearson, Jeff Kaplan, Ian Springer (screenplay); Pedro Pascal, Vanessa Kirby, Ebon Moss-Bachrach, Joseph Quinn, Julia Garner, Sarah Niles, Mark Gatiss, Natasha Lyonne, Paul Walter Hauser, Ralph Ineson	
J U L Y	25	Happy Gilmore 2	Netflix / Happy Madison Productions	Kyle Newacheck (director); Tim Herlihy, Adam Sandler (screenplay); Adam Sandler, Julie Bowen, Christopher McDonald, Benny Safdie, Benito Antonio Martínez Ocasio, John Daly, Ben Stiller	
J U L Y	25	The Home	Lionsgate / Roadside Attractions / Miramax	James DeMonaco (director/screenplay); Adam Cantor (screenplay); Pete Davidson, John Glover, Bruce Altman	
J U L Y	25	Oh, Hi!	Sony Pictures Classics	Sophie Brooks (director/screenplay); Molly Gordon, Logan Lerman, Geraldine Viswanathan, John Reynolds, David Cross	
J U L Y	25	Osiris	Vertical / XYZ Films	William Kaufman (director/screenplay); Paul Reichelt (screenplay); Max Martini, Brianna Hildebrand, LaMonica Garrett, Michael Irby, Linda Hamilton	
J U L Y	25	Et Tu	Buffalo 8 / XYZ Films	Max Tzannes (director/screenplay); Lou Diamond Phillips, Malcolm McDowell, Antwone Barnes, Isabella Blake-Thomas	
J U L Y	25	Snorkeling	Buffalo 8	Emil Nava (director/screenplay); Kristine Froseth, Daniel Zolghadri, Tim Johnson Jr.	
J U L Y	25	Star People	Blue Harbor Entertainment	Adam Finberg (director/screenplay); Kat Cunning, McCabe Slye, Eddie Martinez, Adriana Aluna Martinez, Connor Paolo	
J U L Y	25	The A-Frame	Dark Star	Calvin Lee Reeder (director/screenplay); Johnny Whitworth, Dana Namerode, Nik Dodani, Laketa Caston, Phillip Andre Botello, Larissa White, J. Barrett Cooper, Stephen Jared	
J U L Y	25	AJ Goes to the Dog Park	Doppelganger Releasing / Cartuna / Key Bot	Toby Jones (director/screenplay); AJ Thompson, Crystal Cossette Knight, Greg Carlson, Danny Davy, Morgan Davy, Jason Ehlert, Zachary Lutz, Whitney McClain, Ethan Saari	
J U L Y	30	Together	Neon / Tango Entertainment / 30West / Princess Pictures	Michael Shanks (director/screenplay); Dave Franco, Alison Brie, Damon Herriman	
J U L Y	30	War of the Worlds	Amazon MGM Studios / Universal Pictures / Bazelevs Company	Rich Lee (director); Kenneth Golde, Marc Hyman (screenplay); Ice Cube, Eva Longoria, Clark Gregg, Andrea Savage, Henry Hunter Hall, Iman Benson, Devon Bostick, Michael O'Neill	
A U G U S T	1	The Bad Guys 2	Universal Pictures / DreamWorks Animation	Pierre Perifel (director); Yoni Brenner, Etan Cohen (screenplay); Sam Rockwell, Marc Maron, Awkwafina, Craig Robinson, Anthony Ramos, Zazie Beetz, Danielle Brooks, Natasha Lyonne, Maria Bakalova, Alex Borstein, Richard Ayoade, Lilly Singh	
A U G U S T	1	The Naked Gun	Paramount Pictures / Fuzzy Door Productions	Akiva Schaffer (director/screenplay); Dan Gregor, Doug Mand (screenplay); Liam Neeson, Pamela Anderson, Paul Walter Hauser, CCH Pounder, Kevin Durand, Cody Rhodes, Eddy Yu, Liza Koshy, Danny Huston	
A U G U S T	1	She Rides Shotgun	Lionsgate / Fifth Season	Nick Rowland (director); Ben Collins and Luke Piotrowski (screenplay); Taron Egerton, Ana Sophia Heger, Rob Yang, John Carroll Lynch, Odessa A'zion, David Lyons	
A U G U S T	1	Queen of Bones	Vertical / Appian Way Productions	Robert Budreau (director); Michael Burgner (screenplay); Julia Butters, Jacob Tremblay, Taylor Schilling, Martin Freeman	
A U G U S T	1	My Oxford Year	Netflix / Temple Hill Entertainment	Iain Morris (director); Allison Burnett, Melissa Osborne (screenplay); Sofia Carson, Corey Mylchreest, Dougray Scott, Catherine McCormack	
A U G U S T	1	Trouble Man	Samuel Goldwyn Films / Swirl Films	Michael Jai White (director); Michael Stradford (screenplay); Michael Jai White, Method Man, Mike Epps, Gillian White, Orlando Jones, La La Anthony	
A U G U S T	6	Sketch	Angel Studios / Wonder Project	Seth Worley (director/screenplay); Tony Hale, D'Arcy Carden, Bianca Belle, Kue Lawrence, Kalon Cox	
A U G U S T	6	Holy Ghost	SRHP Films	Shravan Tiwari (director/screenplay); Jenn Osborne, Cleve Langdale, Aaron Blomberg, Maya Adler	
A U G U S T	6	The Pickup	Amazon MGM Studios / Davis Entertainment	Tim Story (director); Matt Mider, Kevin Burrows (screenplay); Eddie Murphy, Pete Davidson, Eva Longoria, Jack Kesy, Roman Reigns, Marshawn Lynch, Andrew Dice Clay, Keke Palmer	
A U G U S T	8	Weapons	Warner Bros. Pictures / New Line Cinema / Vertigo Entertainment / BoulderLight Pictures	Zach Cregger (director/screenplay); Josh Brolin, Julia Garner, Alden Ehrenreich, Austin Abrams, Cary Christopher, Benedict Wong, Amy Madigan	
A U G U S T	8	Freakier Friday	Walt Disney Pictures / Gunn Films / Burr! Productions	Nisha Ganatra (director); Jordan Weiss (screenplay); Jamie Lee Curtis, Lindsay Lohan, Julia Butters, Sophia Hammons, Manny Jacinto, Maitreyi Ramakrishnan, Rosalind Chao, Chad Michael Murray, Mark Harmon	
A U G U S T	8	My Mother's Wedding	Vertical / Indian Paintbrush	Kristin Scott Thomas (director/screenplay); John Micklethwait (screenplay); Scarlett Johansson, Sienna Miller, Emily Beecham, Freida Pinto, Thibault de Montalembert, Kristin Scott Thomas	
A U G U S T	8	Strange Harvest	Roadside Attractions / Saban Films	Stuart Ortiz (director/screenplay); Peter Zizzo, Terri Apple, Andrew Lauer, Matthew Peschio	
A U G U S T	8	What We Hide	Gravitas Ventures	Dan Kay (director/screenplay); Mckenna Grace, Jojo Regina, Dacre Montgomery, Forrest Goodluck, Jesse Williams, Malia Baker, Fernanda Andrade	
A U G U S T	8	The Occupant	Decal	Hugo Keijzer (director/screenplay); Philip Michael Howe, Roelof Jan Minneboo, Xiao Tang (screenplay); Ella Balinska, Stuart Graham, Rob Delaney	
A U G U S T	8	Site	Blue Fox Entertainment	Jason Eric Perlman (director/screenplay); Jake McLaughlin, Theo Rossi, Miki Ishikawa, Arielle Kebbel	
A U G U S T	8	Boys Go to Jupiter	Cartuna / Irony Point	Julian Glander (director/screenplay); Jack Corbett, Janeane Garofalo, Tavi Gevinson, Elsie Fisher, Grace Kuhlenschmidt, Julio Torres, Joe Pera, Miya Folick, Sarah Sherman, Cole Escola, Max Wittert, Chris Fleming, Eva Victor, River L. Ramirez, Demi Adejuyigbe	
A U G U S T	13	Fixed	Netflix / Sony Pictures Animation	Genndy Tartakovsky (director/screenplay); Jon Vitti (screenplay); Adam DeVine, Idris Elba, Kathryn Hahn	
A U G U S T	13	Red Sonja	Samuel Goldwyn Films / Millennium Media / Cinelou Films	M. J. Bassett (director); Tasha Huo (screenplay); Matilda Lutz, Wallis Day, Robert Sheehan, Michael Bisping, Martyn Ford, Eliza Matengu, Rhona Mitra, Veronica Ferres	
A U G U S T	15	Nobody 2	Universal Pictures / 87North Productions	Timo Tjahjanto (director); Derek Kolstad, Aaron Rabin (screenplay); Bob Odenkirk, Connie Nielsen, John Ortiz, RZA, Colin Hanks, Colin Salmon, Christopher Lloyd, Sharon Stone	
A U G U S T	15	Americana	Lionsgate / Bron Studios / Saks Picture Company	Tony Tost (director/screenplay); Sydney Sweeney, Paul Walter Hauser, Halsey, Simon Rex, Eric Dane, Zahn McClarnon	
A U G U S T	15	Highest 2 Lowest	Apple Studios / A24 / Escape Artists / Mandalay Pictures / 40 Acres and a Mule Filmworks	Spike Lee (director); Alan Fox (screenplay); Denzel Washington, Jeffrey Wright, Ilfenesh Hadera, ASAP Rocky	
A U G U S T	15	Night Always Comes	Netflix	Benjamin Caron (director); Sarah Conradt (screenplay); Vanessa Kirby, Jennifer Jason Leigh, Zack Gottsagen, Stephan James, Randall Park, Julia Fox, Michael Kelly, Eli Roth	
A U G U S T	15	The Knife	Relativity Media / Duplass Brothers Productions	Nnamdi Asomugha (director/screenplay); Mark Duplass (screenplay); Nnamdi Asomugha, Melissa Leo, Aja Naomi King, Manny Jacinto	
A U G U S T	15	East of Wall	Sony Pictures Classics	Kate Beecroft (director/screenplay); Tabatha Zimiga, Porshia Zimiga, Scoot McNairy, Jennifer Ehle	
A U G U S T	15	Under Fire	Vertical / Voltage Pictures	Steven C. Miller (director); Cory Todd Hughes, Adrian Speckert (screenplay); Dylan Sprouse, Mason Gooding, Emilio Rivera, Declan Michael Laird	
A U G U S T	15	Descendent	RLJE Films	Peter Cilella (director/screenplay); Ross Marquand, Sarah Bolger	
A U G U S T	15	Witchboard	The Avenue / Atlas Distribution	Chuck Russell (director/screenplay); Jamie Campbell Bower, Madison Iseman, Aaron Dominguez, Antonia Desplat, Charlie Tahan	
A U G U S T	15	Jimmy and Stiggs	Iconic Events Releasing / The Horror Section	Joe Begos (director/screenplay); Joe Begos, Matt Mercer, Riley Dandy, Josh Ethier, James Russo	
A U G U S T	15	A Spartan Dream	Freestyle Digital Media	M. Achilles (director/screenplay); Leonidas G. Demas, George Demas, Michael A. Nickles (screenplay); Peter Bundic, Georgia Mesariti, Katerina Didaskalou, Renos Haralambidis, Kostas Koroniaos, Nikos Tsergas	
A U G U S T	20	The Map That Leads to You	Amazon MGM Studios / Temple Hill Entertainment	Lasse Hallström (director); Leslie Bohem, Vera Herbert (screenplay); Madelyn Cline, KJ Apa, Sofia Wylie, Madison Thompson, Josh Lucas	
A U G U S T	20	Hell House LLC: Lineage	Terror Films / Iconic Events Releasing / Shudder	Stephen Cognetti (director/screenplay); Elizabeth Vermilyea, Searra Sawka, Mike Sutton, Joe Bandelli	
A U G U S T	21	C O.G.	Reckless Content	Tommy Savas (ditector): Piper Curda, Josh Zuckerman, Noel Fisher	
A U G U S T	22	Honey Don't!	Focus Features / Working Title Films	Ethan Coen (director/screenplay); Tricia Cooke (screenplay); Margaret Qualley, Aubrey Plaza, Chris Evans	
A U G U S T	22	Eenie Meanie	Hulu / 20th Century Studios	Shawn Simmons (director/screenplay); Samara Weaving, Karl Glusman, Jermaine Fowler, Marshawn Lynch, Randall Park, Steve Zahn, Andy García	
A U G U S T	22	Eden	Vertical / Imagine Entertainment / AGC Studios	Ron Howard (director); Noah Pink (screenplay); Jude Law, Ana de Armas, Vanessa Kirby, Daniel Brühl, Sydney Sweeney, Toby Wallace, Felix Kammerer, Richard Roxburgh	
A U G U S T	22	Relay	Bleecker Street / Black Bear Pictures / Thunder Road Films	David Mackenzie (director); Justin Piasecki (screenplay); Riz Ahmed, Lily James, Sam Worthington	
A U G U S T	22	Splitsville	Neon / Topic Studios	Michael Angelo Covino (director/screenplay); Kyle Marvin (screenplay); Dakota Johnson, Adria Arjona, Kyle Marvin, Michael Angelo Covino, Nicholas Braun, David Castañeda, O-T Fagbenle	
A U G U S T	22	Afterburn	Saban Films / Original Film	J. J. Perry (director); Matt Johnson, Nimród Antal (screenplay); Dave Bautista, Samuel L. Jackson, Olga Kurylenko, Kristofer Hivju	
A U G U S T	22	Lurker	Mubi	Alex Russell (director/screenplay); Théodore Pellerin, Archie Madekwe, Zack Fox, Havana Rose Liu, Wale Onayemi, Daniel Zolghadri, Sunny Suljic	
A U G U S T	22	Trust	Republic Pictures / Twisted Pictures	Carlson Young (director); Gigi Levangie (screenplay); Sophie Turner, Rhys Coiro, Billy Campbell, Peter Mensah, Forrest Goodluck, Gianni Paolo, Renata Vaca, Katey Sagal	
A U G U S T	22	We Strangers	Quiver Distribution	Anu Valia (director/screenplay); Kirby Howell-Baptiste, Tina Lifford, Sarah Goldberg, Maria Dizzia, Kara Young, Hari Dhillon, Paul Adelstein	
A U G U S T	27	The Workout	Anchor Bay Entertainment	James Cullen Bressack (director/screenplay); David Josh Lawrence, BJ Hendricks (screenplay); Peter Jae, Galadriel Stineman, Josh Kelly, Ashlee Evans-Smith, Kristos Andrews, Augie Duke	
A U G U S T	28	The Thursday Murder Club	Netflix / Amblin Entertainment	Chris Columbus (director/screenplay); Katy Brand, Suzanne Heathcote (screenplay); Helen Mirren, Pierce Brosnan, Ben Kingsley, Celia Imrie, David Tennant, Jonathan Pryce, Naomi Ackie, Daniel Mays, Henry Lloyd-Hughes, Richard E. Grant, Tom Ellis, Geoff Bell, Paul Freeman, Sarah Niles, Ingrid Oliver	
A U G U S T	29	Caught Stealing	Columbia Pictures / Protozoa Pictures	Darren Aronofsky (director); Charlie Huston (screenplay); Austin Butler, Regina King, Zoë Kravitz, Matt Smith, Liev Schreiber, Vincent D'Onofrio, Griffin Dunne, Benito Antonio Martínez Ocasio, Carol Kane	
A U G U S T	29	The Roses	Searchlight Pictures	Jay Roach (director); Tony McNamara (screenplay); Benedict Cumberbatch, Olivia Colman, Andy Samberg, Allison Janney, Belinda Bromilow, Sunita Mani, Ncuti Gatwa, Jamie Demetriou, Zoë Chao, Kate McKinnon	
A U G U S T	29	The Toxic Avenger	Cineverse / Iconic Events Releasing / Legendary Entertainment / Troma Entertainment	Macon Blair (director/screenplay); Peter Dinklage, Jacob Tremblay, Taylour Paige, Julia Davis, Jonny Coyne, Elijah Wood, Kevin Bacon	
A U G U S T	29	Griffin in Summer	Vertical	Nicholas Colia (director/screenplay); Everett Blunck, Melanie Lynskey, Owen Teague, Abby Ryder Fortson, Michael Esper, Kathryn Newton	
A U G U S T	29	A Little Prayer	Music Box Films	Angus MacLachlan (director/screenplay); David Strathairn, Jane Levy, Dascha Polanco, Will Pullen, Anna Camp, Celia Weston	
A U G U S T	29	Love, Brooklyn	Greenwich Entertainment	Rachel Abigail Holder (director); Paul Zimmerman (screenplay); André Holland, Nicole Beharie, DeWanda Wise, Roy Wood Jr.	
A U G U S T	29	Sanatorium Under the Sign of the Hourglass	KimStim / British Film Institute / Telewizja Polska S.A.	Brothers Quay (director/screenplay); Tadeusz Janiszewski, Wioletta Kopańska, Andrzej Kłak, Allison Bell, Zenaida Yanowsky	
S E P T E M B E R	5	The Conjuring: Last Rites	Warner Bros. Pictures / New Line Cinema / Atomic Monster / The Safran Company	Michael Chaves (director); Ian Goldberg, Richard Naing, David Leslie Johnson-McGoldrick (screenplay); Patrick Wilson, Vera Farmiga, Mia Tomlinson, Ben Hardy, Steve Coulter	
S E P T E M B E R	5	Twinless	Lionsgate / Roadside Attractions / Republic Pictures	James Sweeney (director/screenplay); Dylan O'Brien, James Sweeney, Aisling Franciosi, Lauren Graham, Tasha Smith, Chris Perfetti	
S E P T E M B E R	5	The Threesome	Vertical	Chad Hartigan (director); Ethan Ogilby (screenplay); Zoey Deutch, Jonah Hauer-King, Ruby Cruz, Jaboukie Young-White, Josh Segarra, Robert Longstreet, Arden Myrin, Julia Sweeney	
S E P T E M B E R	5	Preparation for the Next Life	Orion Pictures / Plan B Entertainment	Bing Liu (director); Martyna Majok (screenplay); Sebiye Behtiyar, Fred Hechinger	
S E P T E M B E R	5	The Cut	Republic Pictures	Sean Ellis (director); Justin Bull (screenplay); Orlando Bloom, Caitríona Balfe, John Turturro	
S E P T E M B E R	5	Bad Man	Vertical / C'est Lovi Productions / SSS Entertainment	Michael Dilibert (director/screenplay); JJ Nelson (screenplay); Seann William Scott, Johnny Simmons, Chance Perdomo, Lovi Poe, Kaitlin Doubleday, Ethan Suplee, Rob Riggle	
S E P T E M B E R	5	The Baltimorons	Independent Film Company / Duplass Brothers Productions	Jay Duplass (director/screenplay); Michael Strassner (screenplay); Michael Strassner, Liz Larsen, Olivia Luccardi	
S E P T E M B E R	5	Pools	Circle Collective	Sam Hayes (director/screenplay); Odessa A'zion, Mason Gooding, Michael Vlamis, Tyler Alvarez, Suzanne Cryer, Israel Idonije	
S E P T E M B E R	5	Light of the World	Salvation Poem Project / Epipheo / Lighthouse Studios	Tom Bancroft, John Schafer (directors); David Armstrong, Drew Armstrong (screenplay); David Kaye, Adam Kozlick	
S E P T E M B E R	5	The Devil's Disciples	Lion Heart Distribution / Hollow Films / Primal Motion Pictures	Joe Hollow (director/screenplay); Tony Todd, Angus Scrimm, Bill Moseley, Linnea Quigley, Brinke Stevens, Barbara Magnolfi, Debbie Rochon	
S E P T E M B E R	9	The Fetus	Stonecutter Media	Joe Lam (director/screenplay); Bill Moseley, Lauren LaVera, Julian Curtis	
S E P T E M B E R	12	Downton Abbey: The Grand Finale	Focus Features / Carnival Films	Simon Curtis (director); Julian Fellowes (screenplay); Hugh Bonneville, Laura Carmichael, Jim Carter, Michelle Dockery, Paul Giamatti, Phyllis Logan, Allen Leech, Elizabeth McGovern, Joely Richardson, Alessandro Nivola, Imelda Staunton, Dominic West, Penelope Wilton	
S E P T E M B E R	12	The Long Walk	Lionsgate / Vertigo Entertainment	Francis Lawrence (director); JT Mollner (screenplay); Cooper Hoffman, David Jonsson, Garrett Wareing, Joshua Odjick, Tut Nyuot, Charlie Plummer, Ben Wang, Roman Griffin Davis, Jordan Gonzalez, Josh Hamilton, Judy Greer, Mark Hamill	
S E P T E M B E R	12	Spinal Tap II: The End Continues	Bleecker Street / Castle Rock Entertainment	Rob Reiner (director/screenplay); Christopher Guest, Michael McKean, Harry Shearer (screenplay); Christopher Guest, Michael McKean, Harry Shearer, Rob Reiner, Fran Drescher	
S E P T E M B E R	12	The History of Sound	Mubi / Film4 / Closer Media / Tango Entertainment	Oliver Hermanus (director); Ben Shattuck (screenplay); Paul Mescal, Josh O'Connor, Chris Cooper	
S E P T E M B E R	12	Tin Soldier	Samuel Goldwyn Films	Brad Furman (director/screenplay); Jess Fuerst, Pablo Fenjves (screenplay); Jamie Foxx, Robert De Niro, Scott Eastwood, John Leguizamo, Shamier Anderson, Rita Ora	
S E P T E M B E R	12	The Wrong Paris	Netflix	Janeen Damian (director); Nicole Henrich (screenplay); Miranda Cosgrove, Pierson Fodé, Madison Pettis, Madeleine Arthur, Frances Fisher, Yvonne Orji	
S E P T E M B E R	12	Looking Through Water	Good Deed Entertainment	Roberto Sneider (director); Rowdy Herrington, Zach Dean (screenplay); Michael Stahl-David, David Morse, Cameron Douglas, Ximena Romo, Walker Scobell, Michael Douglas	
S E P T E M B E R	12	Rabbit Trap	Magnet Releasing / SpectreVision	Bryn Chainey (director/screenplay); Dev Patel, Rosy McEwen, Jade Croot	
S E P T E M B E R	12	Code 3	Aura Entertainment / Wayfarer Studios	Christopher Leone (director/screenplay); Patrick Pianezza (screenplay); Rainn Wilson, Lil Rel Howery, Aimee Carrero	
S E P T E M B E R	12	Motherland	Vertical	Evan Matthews (director); Nicole Roewe (screenplay); Miriam Silverman, Holland Taylor, Néstor Carbonell	
S E P T E M B E R	12	Traumatika	Saban Films	Pierre Tsigaridis (director/screenplay); Maxime Rancon (screenplay); Rebekah Kennedy, Ranen Navat, Emily Goss, Susan Gayle Watts	
S E P T E M B E R	12	The Man in My Basement	Hulu / Andscape	Nadia Latif (director/screenplay); Walter Mosley (screenplay); Corey Hawkins, Willem Dafoe, Anna Diop, Tamara Lawrance	
S E P T E M B E R	12	Sunfish (& Other Stories on Green Lake)	The Future of Film Is Female	Sierra Falconer (director/screenplay); Maren Heary, Jim Kaplan, Karsen Liotta, Dominic Bogart, Tenley Kellogg, Emily Hall	
S E P T E M B E R	19	Him	Universal Pictures / Monkeypaw Productions	Justin Tipping (director/screenplay); Zack Akers, Skip Bronkie (screenplay); Marlon Wayans, Tyriq Withers, Julia Fox, Tim Heidecker, Jim Jefferies	
S E P T E M B E R	19	A Big Bold Beautiful Journey	Columbia Pictures / 30West	Kogonada (director); Seth Reiss (screenplay); Colin Farrell, Margot Robbie, Kevin Kline, Phoebe Waller-Bridge	
S E P T E M B E R	19	The Lost Bus	Apple TV+ / Apple Studios / Blumhouse Productions	Paul Greengrass (director/screenplay); Brad Ingelsby (screenplay); Matthew McConaughey, America Ferrera, Yul Vazquez, Ashlie Atkinson, Spencer Watson	
S E P T E M B E R	19	The Senior	Angel / Wayfarer Studios	Rod Lurie (director); Bob Eisele (screenplay); Michael Chiklis, Mary Stuart Masterson, Rob Corddry, Brandon Flynn	
S E P T E M B E R	19	Swiped	Hulu / 20th Century Studios	Rachel Lee Goldenberg (director/screenplay); Bill Parker, Kim Caramele (screenplay); Lily James, Dan Stevens, Myha'la, Jackson White, Ben Schnetzer, Pierson Fodé, Ian Colletti	
S E P T E M B E R	19	Waltzing with Brando	Iconic Events Releasing	Bill Fishman (director/screenplay); Billy Zane, Jon Heder, Richard Dreyfuss, Camille Razat, Alaina Huffman, Tia Carrere, James Jagger	
S E P T E M B E R	19	Adulthood	Republic Pictures	Alex Winter (director); Michael M.B. Galvin (screenplay); Kaya Scodelario, Josh Gad, Alex Winter, Billie Lourd, Anthony Carrigan	
S E P T E M B E R	19	London Calling	Quiver Distribution	Allan Ungar (director/screenplay); Omer Levin Menekse, Quinn Wolfe (screenplay); Josh Duhamel, Rick Hoffman, Jeremy Ray Taylor, Aidan Gillen	
S E P T E M B E R	19	The Summer Book	Music Box Films	Charlie McDowell (director); Robert Jones (screenplay); Glenn Close, Emily Matthews, Anders Danielsen Lie	
S E P T E M B E R	19	Prisoner of War	Well Go USA Entertainment	Louis Mandylor (director); Scott Adkins, Marc Clebanoff (screenplay); Scott Adkins, Peter Shinkoda, Donald Cerrone, Michael Copon	
S E P T E M B E R	19	Doin' It	Aura Entertainment / Likely Story	Sara Zandieh (director/screenplay); Neel Patel, Lilly Singh (screenplay); Lilly Singh, Sonia Dhillon Tully, Sabrina Jalees, Ana Gasteyer, Stephanie Beatriz, Mary Holland	
S E P T E M B E R	19	Plainclothes	Magnolia Pictures	Carmen Emmi (director/screenplay); Russell Tovey, Tom Blyth, Maria Dizzia, Christian Cooke, Gabe Fazio, Amy Forsyth, John Bedford Lloyd	
S E P T E M B E R	19	American Sweatshop	Brainstorm Media	Uta Briesewitz (director); Matthew Nemeth (screenplay); Lili Reinhart, Daniela Melchior, Joel Fry, Christiane Paul	
S E P T E M B E R	19	Night of the Reaper	Shudder	Brandon Christensen (director/screenplay); Jessica Clement, Ryan Robbins, Summer H. Howell, Keegan Connor Tracy, Matty Finochi, Max Christensen, Bryn Samuel, Ben Cockell	
S E P T E M B E R	19	Xeno	Blue Fox Entertainment	Matthew Loren Oates (director/screenplay); Lulu Wilson, Omari Hardwick, Paul Schneider	
S E P T E M B E R	25	Stolen Girl	Vertical	James Kent (director); Kas Graham, Rebecca Pollock (screenplay); Kate Beckinsale, Scott Eastwood, Jordan Duvigneau, Matt Craven, Alejandra Howard, Arvin Kananian	
S E P T E M B E R	26	One Battle After Another	Warner Bros. Pictures / Ghoulardi Film Company	Paul Thomas Anderson (director/screenplay); Leonardo DiCaprio, Sean Penn, Benicio del Toro, Regina Hall, Teyana Taylor, Chase Infiniti	
S E P T E M B E R	26	Gabby's Dollhouse: The Movie	Universal Pictures / DreamWorks Animation	Ryan Crego (director); Mike Lew, Rehana Lew Mirza, Adam Wilson, Melaine Wilson LaBracio (screenplay); Laila Lockhart Kraner, Jason Mantzoukas, Gloria Estefan, Kristen Wiig	
S E P T E M B E R	26	The Strangers – Chapter 2	Lionsgate	Renny Harlin (director); Alan R. Cohen, Alan Freedland (screenplay); Madelaine Petsch, Gabriel Basso, Froy Gutierrez, Ema Horvath, Ella Bruccoleri	
S E P T E M B E R	26	Stolen Girl	Vertical / Voltage Pictures	James Kent (director); Kas Graham, Rebecca Polluck (screenplay); Kate Beckinsale, Scott Eastwood, Matt Craven, Ana Golja	
S E P T E M B E R	26	Eleanor the Great	Sony Pictures Classics / TriStar Pictures / Pinky Promise / Maven Screen Media	Scarlett Johansson (director); Tory Kamen (screenplay); June Squibb, Erin Kellyman, Jessica Hecht, Rita Zohar, Chiwetel Ejiofor	
S E P T E M B E R	26	All of You	Apple TV+ / Republic Pictures / MRC / Ryder Picture Company	William Bridges (director/screenplay); Brett Goldstein (screenplay); Brett Goldstein, Imogen Poots, Zawe Ashton, Steven Cree, Jenna Coleman	
S E P T E M B E R	26	Dead of Winter	Vertical / Wild Bunch Germany / Zweites Deutsches Fernsehen	Brian Kirk (director); Nicholas Jacobson-Larson, Dalton Leeb (screenplay); Emma Thompson, Judy Greer, Marc Menchaca, Laurel Marsden, Brían F. O'Byrne	
S E P T E M B E R	26	All the Devils Are Here	Republic Pictures / T-Street Productions	Barnaby Roper (director); John Patrick Dover (screenplay); Sam Claflin, Eddie Marsan, Burn Gorman, Tienne Simon, Suki Waterhouse, Rory Kinnear	
S E P T E M B E R	26	Ruth & Boaz	Netflix / Tyler Perry Studios	Alanna Brown (director); Michael Elliot, Cory Tynan (screenplay); Serayah McNeill, Tyler Lepley, Phylicia Rashad	
S E P T E M B E R	29	Sincerely Saul	Children of Celluloid	Ian Tripp (director/screenplay); Ryan Schafer, Mickey Faerch, Augie Duke, Karl Backus, Brendan Cahalan, Amber Grayson, Paul Fisher III, Randy Davison, Luis Martinez, Beth Gallagher, T.K. Richardson	

== October–December ==
Opening		Title	Production company	Cast and crew	Ref.
O C T O B E R	1	Play Dirty	Amazon MGM Studios / Team Downey	Shane Black (director/screenplay); Charles Mondry, Anthony Bagarozzi (screenplay); Mark Wahlberg, LaKeith Stanfield, Rosa Salazar, Keegan-Michael Key, Chukwudi Iwuji, Nat Wolff, Gretchen Mol, Thomas Jane, Tony Shalhoub	
O C T O B E R	3	The Smashing Machine	A24 / Seven Bucks Productions	Benny Safdie (director/screenplay); Dwayne Johnson, Emily Blunt, Ryan Bader, Bas Rutten, Oleksandr Usyk	
O C T O B E R	3	Anemone	Focus Features / Plan B Entertainment	Ronan Day-Lewis (director/screenplay); Daniel Day-Lewis (screenplay); Daniel Day-Lewis, Sean Bean, Samuel Bottomley, Safia Oakley-Green, Samantha Morton	
O C T O B E R	3	Good Boy	Independent Film Company / Shudder	Ben Leonberg (director/screenplay); Shane Jensen, Arielle Friedman, Larry Fessenden, Indy	
O C T O B E R	3	Shell	Republic Pictures / Dark Castle Entertainment	Max Minghella (director); Jack Stanley (screenplay); Elisabeth Moss, Kate Hudson, Kaia Gerber, Elizabeth Berkley, Arian Moayed, Este Haim, Lionel Boyce, Amy Landecker	
O C T O B E R	3	Bone Lake	Bleecker Street / LD Entertainment	Mercedes Bryce Morgan (director); Joshua Friedlander (screenplay); Maddie Hasson, Alex Roe, Andra Nechita, Marco Pigossi	
O C T O B E R	3	Coyotes	Aura Entertainment / Gramercy Park Media	Colin Minihan (director); Tad Daggerhart, Daniel Meersand, Nick Simon (screenplay); Justin Long, Kate Bosworth, Brittany Allen, Katherine McNamara, Norbert Leo Butz, Keir O'Donnell	
O C T O B E R	3	Killing Faith	Shout! Studios / Filmology Finance	Ned Crowley (director/screenplay); Guy Pearce, DeWanda Wise, Bill Pullman	
O C T O B E R	7	Bad Men Must Bleed	Vantage Media	Micah Lyons (director/screenplay); Todd Terry, Chris Routhe, Chad Michael Murray, Lexi Rabe, Willie Robertson, Melanie Martyn, Brad Leland, Bruce Dern	
O C T O B E R	8	Maintenance Required	Amazon MGM Studios	Lacey Uhlemeyer (director/screenplay); Roo Berry, Erin Falconer (screenplay); Madelaine Petsch, Jacob Scipio, Madison Bailey, Katy O'Brian, Inanna Sarkis, Matteo Lane, Jim Gaffigan	
O C T O B E R	10	Tron: Ares	Walt Disney Pictures	Joachim Rønning (director); Jesse Wigutow (screenplay); Jared Leto, Greta Lee, Evan Peters, Jodie Turner-Smith, Hasan Minhaj, Arturo Castro, Gillian Anderson, Jeff Bridges	
O C T O B E R	10	Roofman	Paramount Pictures / Miramax / FilmNation Entertainment	Derek Cianfrance (director/screenplay); Kirk Gunn (screenplay); Channing Tatum, Kirsten Dunst, Ben Mendelsohn, LaKeith Stanfield, Juno Temple, Melonie Diaz, Uzo Aduba, Lily Collias, Jimmy O. Yang, Peter Dinklage	
O C T O B E R	10	After the Hunt	Metro-Goldwyn-Mayer / Imagine Entertainment / Frenesy Film Company	Luca Guadagnino (director); Nora Garrett (screenplay); Julia Roberts, Ayo Edebiri, Andrew Garfield, Michael Stuhlbarg, Chloë Sevigny	
O C T O B E R	10	Soul on Fire	Affirm Films / Brookwell McNamara Entertainment	Sean McNamara (director); Gregory Poirier (screenplay); William H. Macy, John Corbett, Joel Courtney	
O C T O B E R	10	Kiss of the Spider Woman	Lionsgate / Roadside Attractions / LD Entertainment / Artists Equity / Nuyorican Productions	Bill Condon (director/screenplay); Diego Luna, Tonatiuh Elizarraraz, Jennifer Lopez	
O C T O B E R	10	A House of Dynamite	Netflix	Kathryn Bigelow (director); Noah Oppenheim (screenplay); Idris Elba, Rebecca Ferguson, Gabriel Basso, Jared Harris, Tracy Letts, Anthony Ramos, Moses Ingram, Jonah Hauer-King, Greta Lee, Jason Clarke	
O C T O B E R	10	The Woman in Cabin 10	Netflix / Sister	Simon Stone (director/screenplay); Joe Shrapnel, Anna Waterhouse (screenplay); Keira Knightley, Guy Pearce, David Ajala, Art Malik, Gugu Mbatha-Raw, Kaya Scodelario, David Morrissey, Daniel Ings, Hannah Waddingham	
O C T O B E R	10	Vicious	Paramount+ / Paramount Pictures / Atlas Independent	Bryan Bertino (director/screenplay); Dakota Fanning, Kathryn Hunter, Mary McCormack, Rachel Blanchard, Devyn Nekoda, Klea Scott	
O C T O B E R	10	If I Had Legs I'd Kick You	A24	Mary Bronstein (director/screenplay); Rose Byrne, Conan O'Brien, Danielle Macdonald, Christian Slater, ASAP Rocky	
O C T O B E R	10	Fairyland	Lionsgate / Willa / American Zoetrope	Andrew Durham (director/screenplay); Emilia Jones, Scoot McNairy, Cody Fern, Maria Bakalova, Nessa Dougherty, Adam Lambert, Geena Davis	
O C T O B E R	10	Deathstalker	Shout! Studios	Steven Kostanski (director/screenplay); Daniel Bernhardt, Patton Oswalt, Christina Orjalo, Paul Lazenby, Nina Bergman	
O C T O B E R	10	Re-Election	Picturehouse	Adam Saunders (director/screenplay); Adam Saunders, Tony Danza, Bex Taylor-Klaus, Kym Whitley, Rizwan Manji	
O C T O B E R	15	The Family McMullen	Fathom Entertainment / Warner Bros. Pictures	Edward Burns (director/screenplay); Connie Britton, Michael McGlone, Edward Burns, Tracee Ellis Ross, Halston Sage, Juliana Canfield, Pico Alexander, Brian d'Arcy James	
O C T O B E R	17	Black Phone 2	Universal Pictures / Blumhouse Productions	Scott Derrickson (director/screenplay); C. Robert Cargill (screenplay); Mason Thames, Madeleine McGraw, Jeremy Davies, Miguel Mora, Demián Bichir, Ethan Hawke	
O C T O B E R	17	Good Fortune	Lionsgate	Aziz Ansari (director/screenplay); Seth Rogen, Aziz Ansari, Keke Palmer, Sandra Oh, Keanu Reeves	
O C T O B E R	17	Frankenstein	Netflix	Guillermo del Toro (director/screenplay); Oscar Isaac, Jacob Elordi, Mia Goth, Felix Kammerer, David Bradley, Lars Mikkelsen, Christian Convery, Charles Dance, Christoph Waltz	
O C T O B E R	17	The Twits	Netflix / Netflix Animation / Jellyfish Pictures	Phil Johnston (director/screenplay); Meg Favreau (screenplay); Margo Martindale, Johnny Vegas, Maitreyi Ramakrishnan, Ryan Lopez, Emilia Clarke, Natalie Portman	
O C T O B E R	17	Truth & Treason	Angel	Matt Whitaker (director/screenplay); Ethan Vincent (screenplay); Ewan Horrocks, Rupert Evans, Sean Mahon, Joanna Christie	
O C T O B E R	17	Blue Moon	Sony Pictures Classics / Cinetic Media	Richard Linklater (director); Robert Kaplow (screenplay); Ethan Hawke, Margaret Qualley, Bobby Cannavale, Andrew Scott	
O C T O B E R	17	The Mastermind	Mubi	Kelly Reichardt (director/screenplay); Josh O'Connor, Alana Haim, Hope Davis, John Magaro, Gaby Hoffmann, Bill Camp	
O C T O B E R	17	The Astronaut	Vertical	Jess Varley (director/screenplay); Kate Mara, Laurence Fishburne, Gabriel Luna, Ivana Miličević	
O C T O B E R	17	The Wilderness	Dark Star Pictures / Disarming Films	Spencer King (director/screenplay); Hunter Doohan, Lamar Johnson, Aaron Holliday, Matt Gomez-Hidaka, Vinessa Shaw, Liana Liberato, Sam Jaeger	
O C T O B E R	17	Fuck My Son!	Professional Motion Picture / Little Titan	Todd Rohal (director/screenplay); Tipper Newton, Steve Little, Robert Longstreet, Kynzie Colmery, Macon Blair	
O C T O B E R	22	Hedda	Amazon MGM Studios / Orion Pictures / Plan B Entertainment	Nia DaCosta (director/screenplay); Tessa Thompson, Imogen Poots, Tom Bateman, Nicholas Pinnock, Nina Hoss	
O C T O B E R	22	The Hand That Rocks the Cradle	Hulu / 20th Century Studios / Radar Pictures	Michelle Garza Cervera (director); Micah Bloomberg (screenplay); Mary Elizabeth Winstead, Maika Monroe, Raúl Castillo, Martin Starr	
O C T O B E R	24	Regretting You	Paramount Pictures / Constantin Film	Josh Boone (director); Susan McMartin (screenplay); Allison Williams, Mckenna Grace, Dave Franco, Mason Thames, Sam Morelos, Scott Eastwood, Willa Fitzgerald, Clancy Brown	
O C T O B E R	24	Springsteen: Deliver Me from Nowhere	20th Century Studios / Gotham Group	Scott Cooper (director/screenplay); Jeremy Allen White, Jeremy Strong, Paul Walter Hauser, Stephen Graham, Odessa Young, Gaby Hoffmann, Marc Maron, David Krumholtz	
O C T O B E R	24	Bugonia	Focus Features / CJ ENM / Fruit Tree / Element Pictures	Yorgos Lanthimos (director); Will Tracy (screenplay); Emma Stone, Jesse Plemons, Aidan Delbis, Stavros Halkias, Alicia Silverstone	
O C T O B E R	24	Shelby Oaks	Neon / Intrepid Pictures	Chris Stuckmann (director/screenplay); Camille Sullivan, Brendan Sexton III, Keith David, Sarah Durn, Derek Mears, Emily Bennett, Charlie Talbert, Robin Bartlett, Michael Beach	
O C T O B E R	24	Last Days	Vertical / Gotham Group / Brillstein Entertainment Partners	Justin Lin (director); Ben Ripley (screenplay); Sky Yang, Radhika Apte, Ali Fardi, Naveen Andrews, Ken Leung, Toby Wallace, Ciara Bravo, Claire Price, Marny Kennedy	
O C T O B E R	24	Queens of the Dead	Independent Film Company / Shudder	Tina Romero (director/screenplay); Erin Judge (screenplay); Katy O'Brian, Jaquel Spivey, Riki Lindhome, Jack Haven, Cheyenne Jackson, Margaret Cho	
O C T O B E R	24	In Our Blood	Utopia / Revelations Entertainment	Pedro Kos (director); Mallory Westfall (screenplay); Brittany O'Grady, E. J. Bonilla, Krisha Fairchild, Alanna Ubach	
O C T O B E R	29	Anniversary	Lionsgate / Roadside Attractions / Fifth Season / Chockstone Pictures	Jan Komasa (director); Lori Rosene-Gambino (screenplay); Diane Lane, Kyle Chandler, Madeline Brewer, Zoey Deutch, Phoebe Dynevor, Mckenna Grace, Daryl McCormack, Dylan O'Brien	
O C T O B E R	30	Self-Help	Cineverse / Bloody Disgusting	Erik Bloomquist (director/screenplay); Carson Bloomquist (screenplay); Landry Bender, Jake Weber, Madison Lintz, Amy Hargreaves	
O C T O B E R	31	Nouvelle Vague	Netflix / ARP Productions	Richard Linklater (director); Holly Gent, Vincent Palmo Jr., Michèle Halberstadt, Laetitia Masson (screenplay); Guillaume Marbeck, Zoey Deutch, Aubry Dullin	
O C T O B E R	31	Violent Ends	Independent Film Company	John-Michael Powell (director/screenplay); Billy Magnussen, James Badge Dale, Kate Burton, Ray McKinnon, Nick Stahl, Alexandra Shipp	
O C T O B E R	31	The Wrecker	Quiver Distribution	Art Camacho (director); Niko Foster, Sophia Louisa Lee (screenplay); Tyrese Gibson, Harvey Keitel, Mena Suvari, Chad Michael Collins, Danny Trejo	
O C T O B E R	31	Safe House	Vertical / Voltage Pictures	Jamie Marshall (director); Leon Langford (screenplay); Lucien Laviscount, Hannah John-Kamen, Ethan Embry, Lewis Tan, Holt McCallany, Adam Levy	
O C T O B E R	31	Messy	Vertical	Alexi Wasser (director/screenplay); Alexi Wasser, Thomas Middleditch, Jack Kilmer, Ruby McCollister, Adam Goldberg, Mario Cantone, Ione Skye	
N O V E M B E R	1	Joy to the World	Hulu / Disney+	Jerry Ciccoritti (director); Neal Dobrofsky, Tippi Dobrofsky (screenplay); Chad Michael Murray, Emmanuelle Chriqui, Ayesha Curry, Guy Sprung, Daniel Kash	
N O V E M B E R	2	Dorothea	Epic Pictures Group	Chad Ferrin (director/screenplay); Susan Priver, Pat McNeely, Lew Temple, Ezra Buzzington, Robert Steven Rhine, Cyril O'Reilly, Robert Miano, Brinke Stevens, Ginger Lynn, William Salyers, Cassandra Gava	
N O V E M B E R	2	Icefall	Aura Entertainment / Arclight Films	Stefan Ruzowitzky (director); George Mahaffey, Steve Isles (screenplay); Joel Kinnaman, Cara Jade Myers, Danny Huston, Martin Sensmeier, Graham Greene	
N O V E M B E R	5	Finding Joy	Amazon MGM Studios / Tyler Perry Studios	Tyler Perry (director/screenplay); Shannon Thornton, Tosin Morohunfola, Brittany S. Hall, Inayah, Aaron O'Connell	
N O V E M B E R	6	The Christmas Ring	Fathom Entertainment	Tyler Russell (director/screenplay); Karen Kingsbury (screenplay); Kelsey Grammer, Benjamin Hollingsworth, Jana Kramer, Jessie James Decker	
N O V E M B E R	7	Predator: Badlands	20th Century Studios / Davis Entertainment / Lawrence Gordon Productions	Dan Trachtenberg (director/screenplay); Patrick Aison (screenplay); Elle Fanning, Dimitrius Schuster-Koloamatangi	
N O V E M B E R	7	Nuremberg	Sony Pictures Classics / Walden Media / Mythology Entertainment	James Vanderbilt (director/screenplay); Russell Crowe, Rami Malek, Leo Woodall, John Slattery, Mark O'Brien, Colin Hanks, Wrenn Schmidt, Lydia Peckham, Richard E. Grant, Michael Shannon	
N O V E M B E R	7	Sarah's Oil	Metro-Goldwyn-Mayer / Wonder Project / Kingdom Story Company	Cyrus Nowrasteh (director/screenplay); Betsy Giffen Nowrasteh (screenplay); Zachary Levi, Naya Desir-Johnson, Sonequa Martin-Green, Garret Dillahunt	
N O V E M B E R	7	Die My Love	Mubi / Black Label Media / Excellent Cadaver / Sikelia Productions	Lynne Ramsay (director/screenplay); Enda Walsh, Alice Birch (screenplay); Jennifer Lawrence, Robert Pattinson, LaKeith Stanfield, Nick Nolte, Sissy Spacek	
N O V E M B E R	7	Christy	Black Bear Pictures / Anonymous Content	David Michôd (director/screenplay); Katherine Fugate, Mirrah Foulkes (screenplay); Sydney Sweeney, Ben Foster, Merritt Wever, Katy O'Brian, Ethan Embry	
N O V E M B E R	7	Train Dreams	Netflix / Black Bear Pictures	Clint Bentley (director/screenplay); Greg Kwedar (screenplay); Joel Edgerton, Felicity Jones, Nathaniel Arcand, Clifton Collins Jr., John Diehl, Paul Schneider, Kerry Condon, William H. Macy	
N O V E M B E R	7	In Your Dreams	Netflix / Netflix Animation	Alex Woo (director/screenplay); Erik Benson (screenplay); Jolie Hoang-Rappaport, Elias Janssen, Craig Robinson, Simu Liu, Cristin Milioti, Omid Djalili, Gia Carides	
N O V E M B E R	7	I Wish You All the Best	Lionsgate	Tommy Dorfman (director/screenplay); Corey Fogelmanis, Miles Gutierrez-Riley, Amy Landecker, Lena Dunham, Alexandra Daddario, Cole Sprouse	
N O V E M B E R	7	Stone Cold Fox	Vertical	Sophie Tabet (director/screenplay); Julia Roth (screenplay); Kiernan Shipka, Krysten Ritter, Kiefer Sutherland, Lorenza Izzo, Jamie Chung, Karen Fukuhara, Mishel Prada	
N O V E M B E R	7	The Beldham	Quiver Distribution	Angela Gulner (director/screenplay); Patricia Heaton, Katie Parker, Emma Fitzpatrick, Corbin Bernsen	
N O V E M B E R	7	Exit Protocol	Saban Films	Shane Dax Taylor (director); Chad Law (screenplay); Scott Martin, Dolph Lundgren, Charlotte Kirk, Michael Jai White	
N O V E M B E R	7	All That We Love	Vertical / Ley Line Entertainment	Yen Tan (director/screenplay); Clay Liford (screenplay); Margaret Cho, Jesse Tyler Ferguson, Kenneth Choi, Alice Lee, Atsuko Okatsuka, Missi Pyle, Devon Bostick	
N O V E M B E R	7	Long Shadows	Quiver Distribution	William Shockley (director/screenplay); Shelley Reid, Grainger Hines (screenplay); Blaine Maye, Sarah Cortez, Dominic Monaghan, Jacqueline Bisset, Dermot Mulroney	
N O V E M B E R	7	Unexpected Christmas	Eammon Films / 3 Diamonds Entertainment	Michael Vaughn Hernandez (director); Cassandra Mann (screenplay); Tabitha Brown, Lil Rel Howery, Anna Maria Horsford, DomiNque Perry, Reagan Gomez-Preston, Ricco Ross	
N O V E M B E R	7	Peter Hujar's Day	Janus Films	Ira Sachs (director/screenplay); Ben Whishaw, Rebecca Hall	
N O V E M B E R	12	A Merry Little Ex-Mas	Netflix / Hartbreak Films	Steve Carr (director); Holly Hester (screenplay); Alicia Silverstone, Oliver Hudson, Jameela Jamil, Pierson Fodé, Melissa Joan Hart	
N O V E M B E R	12	Playdate	Amazon MGM Studios	Luke Greenfield (director); Neil Goldman (screenplay); Kevin James, Alan Ritchson, Sarah Chalke, Alan Tudyk, Stephen Root, Isla Fisher	
N O V E M B E R	14	Now You See Me: Now You Don't	Lionsgate / Summit Entertainment / Secret Hideout	Ruben Fleischer (director); Seth Grahame-Smith, Michael Lesslie, Rhett Reese, Paul Wernick (screenplay); Jesse Eisenberg, Woody Harrelson, Dave Franco, Isla Fisher, Justice Smith, Dominic Sessa, Ariana Greenblatt, Lizzy Caplan, Rosamund Pike, Morgan Freeman	
N O V E M B E R	14	The Running Man	Paramount Pictures / Kinberg Genre	Edgar Wright (director/screenplay); Michael Bacall (screenplay); Glen Powell, William H. Macy, Lee Pace, Michael Cera, Emilia Jones, Daniel Ezra, Jayme Lawson, Sean Hayes, Colman Domingo, Josh Brolin	
N O V E M B E R	14	Keeper	Neon	Osgood Perkins (director); Nick Lepard (screenplay); Tatiana Maslany, Rossif Sutherland, Birkett Turton, Eden Weiss	
N O V E M B E R	14	Jay Kelly	Netflix / Pascal Pictures / Heyday Films	Noah Baumbach (director/screenplay); Emily Mortimer (screenplay); George Clooney, Adam Sandler, Laura Dern, Billy Crudup, Riley Keough, Grace Edwards, Stacy Keach, Jim Broadbent, Patrick Wilson, Eve Hewson, Greta Gerwig, Alba Rohrwacher, Josh Hamilton, Lenny Henry, Emily Mortimer, Nicôle Lecky, Thaddea Graham, Isla Fisher	
N O V E M B E R	14	Trap House	Aura Entertainment / Scott Free Productions	Michael Dowse (director); Gary Scott Thompson, Tom O'Connor (screenplay); Dave Bautista, Sophia Lillis, Jack Champion, Kate del Castillo, Whitney Peak, Bobby Cannavale	
N O V E M B E R	14	Arco	Neon / MountainA	Ugo Bienvenu (director/screenplay); Félix de Givry (screenplay); Will Ferrell, America Ferrera, Flea, Natalie Portman, Mark Ruffalo, Andy Samberg	
N O V E M B E R	14	A Very Jonas Christmas Movie	Disney+ / Disney Branded Television / 20th Television	Jessica Yu (director); Isaac Aptaker, Elizabeth Berger (screenplay); Kevin Jonas, Joe Jonas, Nick Jonas, Chloe Bennet, Billie Lourd, KJ Apa, Laverne Cox, Priyanka Chopra Jonas, Danielle Jonas	
N O V E M B E R	14	Rebuilding	Bleecker Street	Max Walker-Silverman (director/screenplay); Josh O'Connor, Lily LaTorre, Meghann Fahy, Kali Reis, Amy Madigan	
N O V E M B E R	14	The Carpenter's Son	Magnolia Pictures / Saturn Films / Anonymous Content	Lotfy Nathan (director/screenplay); Nicolas Cage, FKA Twigs, Noah Jupe, Souheila Yacoub	
N O V E M B E R	14	Left-Handed Girl	Netflix / Le Pacte	Shih-Ching Tsou (director/screenplay); Sean Baker (screenplay); Janel Tsai, Shih-Yuan Ma, Nina Ye, Brando Huang, Akio Chen, Xin-Yan Chao	
N O V E M B E R	14	King Ivory	Saban Films / Roadside Attractions	John Swab (director/screenplay); James Badge Dale, Ben Foster, Michael Mando, Rory Cochrane, Ritchie Coster, George Carroll, Graham Greene, Melissa Leo	
N O V E M B E R	14	The Perfect Gamble	Saban Films	Danny Abeckaser (director); Kosta Kondilopoulos (screenplay); David Arquette, Daniella Pick, Danny Abeckaser	
N O V E M B E R	14	Bull Run	Vertical	Alfredo Barrios Jr. (director/screenplay); Bill Keenan (screenplay); Tom Blyth, Chris Diamantopoulos, Jay Mohr, Zach Villa, Helena Mattsson, Troy Garity, Sam Daly	
N O V E M B E R	14	Murder at the Embassy	Lionsgate	Stephen Shimek (director); Mark Brennan (screenplay); Mischa Barton, Mido Hamada, Kojo Attah, Nell Barlow, Raha Rahbari, Antonia Bernath, Richard Dillane	
N O V E M B E R	14	Run	Quiver Distribution	Uwe Boll (director/screenplay); Amanda Plummer, James Russo, Ulrich Thomsen, Barkhad Abdi	
N O V E M B E R	14	Muzzle: City of Wolves	RLJE Films	John Stalberg Jr. (director); Jacob Michael King (screenplay); Aaron Eckhart, Tanya van Graan, Karl Otto Thaning, Nicole Fortuin, Hakeem Kae-Kazim	
N O V E M B E R	14	Bunny	Vertical	Ben Jacobson (director/screenplay); Stefan Marolachakis, Mo Stark (screenplay); Mo Stark, Ben Jacobson, Liza Colby, Tony Drazan	
N O V E M B E R	14	Serious People	Tribeca Films / Memory	Pasqual Quiterrez, Ben Mullinkosson (directors/screenplay); Pasqual Quiterrez, Christine Yuan, RJ Sanchez, Miguel Huerta	
N O V E M B E R	18	Killer Rental	Screambox	Ben Hausdorff, Jonathan Kadin (directors/screenplay); Lindsay Arnold, Momo Bedier, Aaron Cavette, Taylor Cooper, Wyatt Hinz	
N O V E M B E R	19	Champagne Problems	Netflix	Mark Steven Johnson (director/screenplay); Minka Kelly, Tom Wozniczka, Thibault de Montalembert, Flula Borg, Astrid Whettnall, Xavier Samuel, Maeve Courtier-Lilley	
N O V E M B E R	21	Wicked: For Good	Universal Pictures / Marc Platt Productions	Jon M. Chu (director); Winnie Holzman, Dana Fox (screenplay); Cynthia Erivo, Ariana Grande, Jonathan Bailey, Ethan Slater, Bowen Yang, Marissa Bode, Colman Domingo, Michelle Yeoh, Jeff Goldblum	
N O V E M B E R	21	Sisu: Road to Revenge	Screen Gems / Stage 6 Films	Jalmari Helander (director/screenplay); Jorma Tommila, Richard Brake, Stephen Lang	
N O V E M B E R	21	Rental Family	Searchlight Pictures	Hikari (director/screenplay); Stephen Blahut (screenplay); Brendan Fraser, Takehiro Hira, Mari Yamamoto, Shannon Mahina Gorman, Akira Emoto	
N O V E M B E R	21	The Family Plan 2	Apple TV+ / Apple Studios / Skydance Media	Simon Cellan Jones (director); David Coggeshall (screenplay); Mark Wahlberg, Michelle Monaghan, Zoe Colletti, Van Crosby, Kit Harington	
N O V E M B E R	21	Blue Eyed Girl	Quiver Distribution	J. Mills Goodloe (director); Marisa Coughlan (screenplay); Marisa Coughlan, Beau Bridges, Eliza Coupe, Freddy Rodriguez, Sam Trammell, LisaGay Hamilton, Bridey Elliott	
N O V E M B E R	21	Reverence	Saban Films	Kyle Kauwika Harris (director/screenplay); Adam Hampton, Gattlin Griffith, Ryan Francis	
N O V E M B E R	21	Altered	Well Go USA Entertainment	Timo Vuorensola (director/screenplay); Tom Felton, Richard Brake, Igor Jijikine, Aggy K. Adams	
N O V E M B E R	25	Wildcat	Aura Entertainment / Signature Entertainment	James Nunn (director); Dominic Burns (screenplay); Kate Beckinsale, Lewis Tan, Rasmus Hardiker, Alice Krige, Bailey Patrick, Tom Bennett, Matt Willis, Roxy Striar	
N O V E M B E R	25	The Best You Can	Sony Pictures Home Entertainment	Michael J. Weithorn (director/screenplay); Kevin Bacon, Kyra Sedgwick, Judd Hirsch, Brittany O'Grady	
N O V E M B E R	25	Blood Star	Quiver Distribution / Beast Production	Lawrence Jacomelli (director/screenplay); Victoria Taylor (screenplay); John Schwab, Britni Camacho	
N O V E M B E R	26	Zootopia 2	Walt Disney Pictures / Walt Disney Animation Studios	Byron Howard (director); Jared Bush (director/screenplay); Ginnifer Goodwin, Jason Bateman, Ke Huy Quan, Fortune Feimster, Andy Samberg, David Strathairn, Idris Elba, Shakira, Patrick Warburton, Quinta Brunson, Danny Trejo, Alan Tudyk, Nate Torrence, Bonnie Hunt, Don Lake, Jenny Slate	
N O V E M B E R	26	Wake Up Dead Man	Netflix / T-Street Productions / Ram Bergman Productions	Rian Johnson (director/screenplay); Daniel Craig, Josh O'Connor, Glenn Close, Josh Brolin, Mila Kunis, Jeremy Renner, Kerry Washington, Andrew Scott, Cailee Spaeny, Daryl McCormack, Thomas Haden Church, Jeffrey Wright	
N O V E M B E R	26	Hamnet	Focus Features / Amblin Entertainment / Neal Street Productions	Chloé Zhao (director/screenplay); Maggie O'Farrell (screenplay); Jessie Buckley, Paul Mescal, Emily Watson, Joe Alwyn, Noah Jupe	
N O V E M B E R	26	Eternity	A24 / Apple Original Films	David Freyne (director); Pat Cunnane (screenplay); Miles Teller, Elizabeth Olsen, Callum Turner, John Early, Olga Merediz, Da'Vine Joy Randolph	
N O V E M B E R	26	Jingle Bell Heist	Netflix	Michael Fimognari (director); Abby McDonald (screenplay); Olivia Holt, Connor Swindells, Lucy Punch, Peter Serafinowicz	
N O V E M B E R	26	Outerlands	Wolfe Video	Elena Oxman (director/screenplay); Asia Kate Dillon, Ridley Asha Bateman, Louisa Krause, Daniel K. Isaac, Lea DeLaria	
N O V E M B E R	28	Aftershock: The Nicole P Bell Story	Faith Media Distribution / Manny Halley Productions / Roc Nation	Alésia Glidewell (director/screenplay); Cas Sigers (screenplay); Rayven Ferrell, Bentley Green, Richard Lawson, Kevin Jackson, Iyana Halley, Richard T. Jones	
N O V E M B E R	28	Stone Creek Killer	Vertical	Robert Enriquez (director); Clint Elliott (screenplay); Clayne Crawford, Lyndon Smith, Britney Young, Vincent Washington, Andrew J. West, Adam Hicks	
D E C E M B E R	2	Savage Hunt	Shout! Studios	Roel Reiné (director); Chad Law, Christopher Jolley (screenplay); James Oliver Wheatley, Fontina Papatheodorou, Priya Blackburn, Anthony Barclay, Colin Mace	
D E C E M B E R	3	Oh. What. Fun.	Amazon MGM Studios / Tribeca Enterprises	Michael Showalter (director/screenplay); Chandler Baker (screenplay); Michelle Pfeiffer, Felicity Jones, Chloë Grace Moretz, Danielle Brooks, Denis Leary, Dominic Sessa, Havana Rose Liu, Maude Apatow, Devery Jacobs, Jason Schwartzman, Eva Longoria, Joan Chen	
D E C E M B E R	3	My Secret Santa	Netflix	Mike Rohl (director); Ron Oliver, Carley Smale (screenplay); Alexandra Breckenridge, Ryan Eggold, Madison MacIsaac, Diana-Maria Riva, Tia Mowry	
D E C E M B E R	5	Five Nights at Freddy's 2	Universal Pictures / Blumhouse Productions	Emma Tammi (director/screenplay); Scott Cawthon (screenplay); Josh Hutcherson, Elizabeth Lail, Piper Rubio, Mckenna Grace, Freddy Carter, Theodus Crane, Teo Briones, Wayne Knight, Skeet Ulrich, Matthew Lillard	
D E C E M B E R	5	Kill Bill: The Whole Bloody Affair	Lionsgate / A Band Apart	Quentin Tarantino (director/screenplay); Uma Thurman, Lucy Liu, Vivica A. Fox, Daryl Hannah, Michael Madsen, Sonny Chiba, Julie Dreyfus, Chiaki Kuriyama, Gordon Liu, Michael Parks, David Carradine	
D E C E M B E R	5	Merrily We Roll Along	Sony Pictures Classics / Fathom Events / RadicalMedia	Maria Friedman (director); Daniel Radcliffe, Jonathan Groff, Lindsay Mendez	
D E C E M B E R	5	Fackham Hall	Bleecker Street	Jim O'Hanlon (director); Jimmy Carr, Patrick Carr, Andrew Dawson, Steve Dawson, Tim Inman (screenplay); Thomasin McKenzie, Ben Radcliffe, Katherine Waterston, Emma Laird, Tom Goodman-Hill, Anna Maxwell Martin, Sue Johnston, Tom Felton, Damian Lewis	
D E C E M B E R	5	Diary of a Wimpy Kid: The Last Straw	Disney+ / Walt Disney Pictures / Bardel Entertainment	Matt Danner (director); Aaron D. Harris, Jude Zarzaur, Hunter Dillon, Erica Cerra, Chris Diamantopoulos, Bashir Salahuddin, William Stanford Davis	
D E C E M B E R	5	100 Nights of Hero	Independent Film Company	Julia Jackman (director/screenplay); Emma Corrin, Nicholas Galitzine, Maika Monroe, Amir El-Masry, Charli XCX, Richard E. Grant, Felicity Jones	
D E C E M B E R	5	The Chronology of Water	The Forge / Scott Free Productions / Fremantle	Kristen Stewart (director/screenplay); Imogen Poots, Thora Birch, Susannah Flood, Tom Sturridge, Kim Gordon, Michael Epp, Earl Cave, Esmé Creed-Miles, Jim Belushi	
D E C E M B E R	5	Rosemead	Vertical / LA Times Studios	Eric Lin (director); Marilyn Fu (screenplay); Lucy Liu, Lawerence Shou, Jennifer Lim, Madison Hu, James Chen, Orion Lee	
D E C E M B E R	5	Frontier Crucible	Well Go USA Entertainment / Bonfire Legend	Travis Mills (director); Harry Whittington (screenplay); Myles Clohessy, Mary Stickley, Eli Brown, Ryan Masson, Zane Holtz, Eddie Spears, Armie Hammer, William H. Macy, Thomas Jane	
D E C E M B E R	5	Hunting Season	Samuel Goldwyn Films	Raja Collins (director); Adam Hampton (screenplay); Mel Gibson, Shelley Hennig, Sofia Hublitz, A. J. Buckley, Jordi Mollà	
D E C E M B E R	5	Man Finds Tape	Magnolia Pictures / XYZ Films	Paul Gandersman, Peter S. Hall (directors/screenplay); Kelsey Pribilski, William Magnuson, John Gholson, Brian Villalobos, Nell Kessler, Graham Skipper	
D E C E M B E R	5	Speed Train	Level 33 Entertainment	Ryan Francis (director/screenplay); Nicky Whelan, Scout Taylor-Compton, Oliver Masucci, Louis Mandylor, Jade Patteri, Liana Ramirez, Karmel Bortoleti, Mike Manning, Ryan Francis	
D E C E M B E R	10	Merv	Amazon MGM Studios / Lightworkers Media	Jessica Swale (director); Dane Clark, Linsey Stewart (screenplay); Zooey Deschanel, Charlie Cox, Chris Redd, David Hunt, Patricia Heaton	
D E C E M B E R	10	It Ends	Letterboxd Video Store	Alexander Ullom (director/screenplay); Phinehas Yoon, Akira Jackson, Noah Toth, Mitchell Cole	
D E C E M B E R	11	The Mother, the Menacer, and Me	Persimmon / Ghost to the Post Productions	Jon Salmon (director); Chris Plaushin, Chris Carvalho (screenplay); Lorraine Bracco, James Austin Kerr, Leah Remini, Christine Spang, Alfonso Caballero, Brian Tichnell, Kellan Tetlow	
D E C E M B E R	12	Ella McCay	20th Century Studios / Gracie Films	James L. Brooks (director/screenplay); Emma Mackey, Jamie Lee Curtis, Jack Lowden, Kumail Nanjiani, Spike Fearn, Ayo Edebiri, Julie Kavner, Rebecca Hall, Albert Brooks, Woody Harrelson	
D E C E M B E R	12	Silent Night, Deadly Night	Cineverse / StudioCanal	Mike P. Nelson (director/screenplay); Rohan Campbell, Ruby Modine, David Lawrence Brown, David Tomlinson, Mark Acheson	
D E C E M B E R	12	Dust Bunny	Roadside Attractions / Lionsgate / eOne Films / Thunder Road Films	Bryan Fuller (director/screenplay); Mads Mikkelsen, Sophie Sloan, Sheila Atim, David Dastmalchian, Sigourney Weaver	
D E C E M B E R	12	Goodbye June	Netflix	Kate Winslet (director); Joe Anders (screenplay); Toni Collette, Johnny Flynn, Andrea Riseborough, Timothy Spall, Kate Winslet, Helen Mirren	
D E C E M B E R	12	Atropia	Vertical / Frenesy Film Company	Hailey Gates (director/screenplay); Alia Shawkat, Callum Turner, Zahra Alzubaidi, Tony Shawkat, Jane Levy, Tim Heidecker, Lola Kirke, Chloë Sevigny	
D E C E M B E R	12	Pose	Vertical / SSS Film Capital / SSS Entertainment	Jamie Adams (director/screenplay); James McAvoy, Lucas Bravo, Leila Farzad, Almudena Amor, Aisling Franciosi	
D E C E M B E R	12	Turbulence	Lionsgate	Claudio Fäh (director); Andy Mayson (screenplay); Hera Hilmar, Jeremy Irvine, Kelsey Grammer, Olga Kurylenko	
D E C E M B E R	12	Not Without Hope	Inaugural Entertainment / Volition Media	Joe Carnahan (director/screenplay); E. Nicholas Mariani (screenplay); Zachary Levi, Josh Duhamel, JoBeth Williams, Quentin Plair	
D E C E M B E R	12	Influencers	Shudder	Kurtis David Harder (director/screenplay); Cassandra Naud, Georgina Campbell, Jonathan Whitesell, Dylan Playfair	
D E C E M B E R	16	Saving Buddy Charles	Tubi	Grace Wethor (director); Jillian Shea Spaeder (screenplay); Analesa Fisher, Jillian Shea Spaeder, Ariel Martin, Ian Boggs, Susan Traylor	
D E C E M B E R	19	Avatar: Fire and Ash	20th Century Studios / Lightstorm Entertainment	James Cameron (director/screenplay); Rick Jaffa, Amanda Silver (screenplay); Sam Worthington, Zoe Saldaña, Sigourney Weaver, Stephen Lang, Oona Chaplin, Cliff Curtis, Joel David Moore, CCH Pounder, Edie Falco, David Thewlis, Jemaine Clement, Giovanni Ribisi, Kate Winslet	
D E C E M B E R	19	The SpongeBob Movie: Search for SquarePants	Paramount Animation / Nickelodeon Movies	Derek Drymon (director); Pam Brady, Matt Lieberman (screenplay); Tom Kenny, Clancy Brown, Rodger Bumpass, Bill Fagerbakke, Carolyn Lawrence, Mr. Lawrence, George Lopez, Ice Spice, Arturo Castro, Sherry Cola, Regina Hall, Mark Hamill	
D E C E M B E R	19	The Housemaid	Lionsgate	Paul Feig (director); Rebecca Sonnenshine (screenplay); Sydney Sweeney, Amanda Seyfried, Brandon Sklenar, Michele Morrone, Elizabeth Perkins	
D E C E M B E R	19	Is This Thing On?	Searchlight Pictures	Bradley Cooper (director/screenplay); Will Arnett, Mark Chappell (screenplay); Will Arnett, Laura Dern, Andra Day, Bradley Cooper, Amy Sedaris, Sean Hayes, Christine Ebersole, Ciarán Hinds	
D E C E M B E R	19	David	Angel / Sunrise Animation Studios	Phil Cunningham, Brent Dawes (directors/screenplay); Phil Wickham, Brandon Engman, Asim Chaudhry, Mick Wingert, Will de Renzy-Martin, Lauren Daigle	
D E C E M B E R	23	The Demoness	Sacred Ember Films / Scary Crow Films	Andrew de Burgh (director/screenplay); Akihiro Kitamura, Riley Nottingham, Bella Glanville, Sydney Culbertson, Mark Pontarelli, Amelia Gotham, Bruce Clifford, Haruka Igarashi	
D E C E M B E R	24	Father Mother Sister Brother	Mubi / The Apartment	Jim Jarmusch (director/screenplay); Tom Waits, Adam Driver, Mayim Bialik, Charlotte Rampling, Cate Blanchett, Vicky Krieps, Sarah Greene, Indya Moore, Luka Sabbat	
D E C E M B E R	24	The Plague	Independent Film Company / Image Nation Abu Dhabi	Charlie Polinger (director/screenplay); Everett Blunck, Kayo Martin, Kenny Rasmussen, Joel Edgerton	
D E C E M B E R	25	Anaconda	Columbia Pictures / Fully Formed Entertainment	Tom Gormican (director/screenplay); Kevin Etten (screenplay); Jack Black, Paul Rudd, Steve Zahn, Thandiwe Newton, Daniela Melchior, Selton Mello	
D E C E M B E R	25	Song Sung Blue	Focus Features / Davis Entertainment	Craig Brewer (director/screenplay); Hugh Jackman, Kate Hudson, Michael Imperioli, Ella Anderson, King Princess, Mustafa Shakir, Hudson Hensley, Fisher Stevens, Jim Belushi	
D E C E M B E R	25	Marty Supreme	A24	Josh Safdie (director/screenplay); Ronald Bronstein (screenplay); Timothée Chalamet, Gwyneth Paltrow, Odessa A'zion, Kevin O'Leary, Tyler Okonma, Abel Ferrara, Fran Drescher	
D E C E M B E R	25	The Testament of Ann Lee	Searchlight Pictures / Annapurna Pictures	Mona Fastvold (director/screenplay); Brady Corbet (screenplay); Amanda Seyfried, Thomasin McKenzie, Lewis Pullman, Stacy Martin, Tim Blake Nelson, Christopher Abbott	
D E C E M B E R	30	Continuance	BayView Entertainment / Rosewood Five	Tony Olmos (director/screenplay); Tony Gorodeckas, Noor Razooky, Teresa Suarez Grosso, Brian Patrick Butler, Kayla Schaffroth, Kelly Potts, Mark Atkinson	
D E C E M B E R	31	I Was a Stranger	Angel Studios	Brandt Andersen (director/screenplay); Yasmine Al Massri, Omar Sy, Jason Beghe	

== See also ==
- 2025 in film
