= Sarah Cortez =

American poet

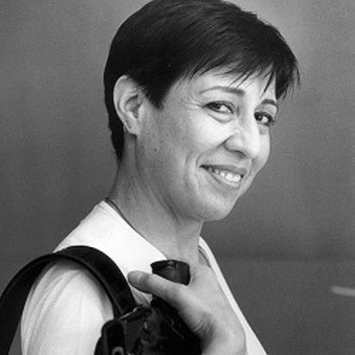
- Citizenship: United States
- Education: B.A. Psychology and Religion, M.A. Classical Studies, M.S. Accountancy
- Alma mater: Rice University, University of Texas in Austin, University of Houston-Central
- Occupations: poet, police officer
- Writing career
- Years active: 1999–present
- Genres: Poetry
- Website: www.poetacortez.com

Sarah Cortez is a Latina poet, teacher, editor, and essayist from Houston, Texas. She is also a law enforcement officer who first gained acclaim for her poetry collection, How to Undress a Cop.

== Early life and career ==
A fifth-generation Texan and native Houstonian, she graduated from St. Agnes Academy in high school, and then attended Rice University majoring in Psychology and Religion. Her first graduate degree was in Classical Studies at the University of Texas in Austin.

She began her career by teaching high school in Houston, TX, then completing an M.S. in Accountancy from the University of Houston-Central, Houston, TX. Her interest in civic organizations and neighborhood safety brought her a series of volunteer positions with Neartown Association, ultimately resulting in citywide appointments to commissions and boards.

This civic participation spawned another interest: law enforcement. She enrolled in the police academy at the University of Houston-Downtown's Criminal Justice Center. Upon graduation, she began working as a law enforcement officer in Harris County, TX. She remained an active-duty patrol police officer until 1999, when she began working as a reserve officer, so she could devote more attention to her writing and editing careers. She remains a reserve officer in Harris County.

== Career as a writer and editor ==
In 1999, her poems won the PEN Texas Literary Award in Poetry. In 2000, her debut volume of poetry, How to Undress a Cop, (Arte Público Press, 2000) was published and won praise from Publishers Weekly: “By turns erotic, tender, and gritty ... Powerfully direct.”

During this time, she began a relationship with the University of Houston, where she served as a visiting scholar, 1999-2001. She is the only Visiting Scholar for the Center for Mexican Studies who has been awarded two consecutive one-year appointments. There she began her work with young people fearful of writing. This experience evolved into her first anthology, Urban Speak: Poetry of the City, which contains poems by her students.

Her work on anthologies of poems, memoir, and short stories honed her skills as a prize-winning editor, producer, and public speaker. Since Urban Speak: Poetry of the City, she has conceptualized and edited seven original anthologies.

Today, she is in demand as an editor for all subgenres of poetry, fiction, and non-fiction. She teaches creative writing workshops throughout the U.S. and abroad.

In 2012, her spiritual memoir, Walking Home: Growing Up Hispanic in Houston (Texas Review Press, 2012) was published. She drew on the stories overheard as a child from her parents, grandparents, and other family members. The book also highlights a deep faith centered in the Catholic religion. Partnered in the book are poems and short prose sections recalling her childhood and adolescence. This book received Honorable Mentions in the Los Angeles Book Festival Awards and the Great Southwest Book Festival.

Cold Blue Steel (Texas Review Press, 2013) is a collection of poems reflecting on law enforcement thirteen years after How to Undress a Cop. She “employs frank language in sharp lyrics charged with weary passion”, says Diego Báez in Booklist. According to reviewer Jeffrey C. Alfier in Rattle: “Cortez’s lines were formed in the cauldron of an American Realist tradition: hard truths told with sharp fidelity by a large city beat cop.” This book, according to reviewer Paul David Adkins says: “Ms. Cortez explores what it means to be female in the traditionally man’s world of law enforcement, governed by violence, cynicism, and despair.” One of the poems in this book won an honorable mention in Rattle's annual contest in 2011, and the book placed finalist in the 2014 Writers League of Texas Poetry Awards and the 2015 PEN Southwest Book Award in Poetry.

Her essays, poems, short essays, and book chapters have been published worldwide. They have been short-listed for honors, such as the Tucson Festival of Books Literary Awards. Her poetry has been part of the Poetry In Motion program of the Poetry Society of American, and has been delivered and displayed at the United Nations in New York City as part of the Eighth Permanent Forum on Indigenous Issues.

In 2024, Cortez received three national writing awards from the National Federation of Press Women.

== Works ==
=== Windows into My World: Latino Youth Write Their Lives (Arte Público Press, 2007) ===
- Winner of a 2008 Skipping Stones Honor Award
- Says School Library Journal: “This collection illuminates both the familiar coming-of-age experiences that transcend cultural differences and the moments that are unique to Latinos in the States.”
- Says the San Antonio Express-News: “It should be a must-read book in every high school senior-level English class due to its thought provoking subject matter."

=== Hit List: The Best of Latino Mystery (Arte Público Press, 2009) ===
- Says Mystery Scene: “Genre-busting stories, some of them tender, some of them brutal, all of them offering an intriguing Latino slant.”
- Says Midwest Book Review: “…a highly recommended read for mystery fans everywhere.”

=== Indian Country Noir (Akashic Noir Series, 2009) ===
- Says Publishers Weekly: "Written by both Naïve American and non-Native authors, the 14 stories in this worthy volume in Askashic's noir series range geographically from Northern California to Puerto Rico and from New York’s Adirondacks to Los Angeles." (Publishers Weekly, June 2010.)

=== You Don't Have a Clue: Latino Mystery Stories for Teens (Piñata Books, 2011) ===
- Finalist, 2012 International Latino Book Award
- Says Booklist (starred review): “This excellent collection—enriched by a thoughtful foreword by YA scholar James Blasingame—gives faces to Latino teens in a most original way.”

=== Our Lost Border: Essays on Life Amid the Narco-Violence (Arte Público Press, 2013) ===
- Winner of the 2014 International Latino Book Award in the Best Spanish or Bilingual Latino Focused Nonfiction Book category
- Winner of the 2013 Southwest Book Award
- Finalist in the Anthologies category for the 2013 Foreword Reviews Book of the Year Awards (now known as the Foreword INDIES)

=== Goodbye, Mexico: Poems of Remembrance (Texas Review Press, 2015) ===
- Finalist for the 2014 International Latino Book Award
- Says reviewer Octavio Quintanilla in Southwestern American Literature: “Overall, Goodbye, Mexico is not only a chronicle of what the poets miss and love about Mexico, but it is also a collective voice that wants change, that wants healing for the country etched in our memory, the Mexico we knew, the Mexico we believe is still there.”

=== Vanishing Points: Poems and Photographs of Texas Roadside Memorials (Texas Review Press, 2016) ===
- A 2016 Southwest Book of the Year
- Winner Press Women of Texas 2016 Award for Editing
- Says reviewer Alyson Ward in The Houston Chronicle, "Vanishing Points: Poems and Photographs of Texas Roadside Memorials pairs Streck's photographs with poems by Cortez and three others. It's a sobering, gorgeous collection..."

=== Against the Sky's Warm Belly: New and Selected Poems (Texas Review Press, 2016) ===
- The poems of Sarah Cortez flex lean muscles to build lyric intensity and a gripping edginess often backlit by an incandescent, controlled eroticism. Cortez reveals the hidden underworld of her fellow police officers, whose lives comprise the thin blue line and whose blood sometimes splashes and blackens on summer concrete.
