= Appalachian Dog =

2025 film

- Official Release Poster
- Directed by: Colin Henning
- Written by: Colin Henning
- Produced by: Colin Henning; Chad Hylton; Georgia Morgan
- Starring: Georgia Morgan; Hayleigh Hart Franklin; Brooke Elizabeth; Colin Henning
- Cinematography: Aidan Macaluso
- Edited by: Chad Hylton
- Production company: C.H. Squared Films
- Distributed by: Buffalo 8 Distribution
- Release date: March 21, 2025
- Running time: 100 minutes
- Country: United States
- Language: English

Appalachian Dog is a 2025 Southern Gothic drama film and feature directorial debut from Colin Henning. Set in Post-War Appalachia, the film oversees the tense reunion between a tailor husband and seamstress wife. The film was written and directed by Henning, who also stars alongside Georgia Morgan, Hayleigh Hart Franklin, and Brooke Elizabeth.

The film was produced by Colin Henning, Chad Hylton, and Georgia Morgan. It is the first feature film by Henning and Hylton's production company, C.H. Squared Films.

== Plot ==
In the winter of 1946, Appalachia, a tailor Teddy Henry is returning home from war. His seamstress wife (and business partner), Marion, is preparing for his arrival, and to introduce him to her new friend, Peggie, who, while Teddy was away, has stepped into his place, sewing. When Teddy arrives, Marion is taken aback by his glasses; he was always 'blind as a bat' but was taught to sew through feeling. Tensions arise when during his 'Welcome Home' dinner, Teddy discovers that his hand is no longer steady enough to sew. That night, Marion and Teddy come to the agreement that he will oversee the finances and Marion will do the sewing.

Teddy struggles adjusting to life back at home, while Marion also struggles - to maintain the independence she gained while he was away. The two are at odds when Teddy orders Marion to fire Peggie and lower prices. Acting on her neighbor Cate's advice, Marion takes Teddy on a picnic by the river to create more intimacy. The two have sex, and during this, Marion reaches for Teddy's glasses in the grass - and breaks them.

Now unable to read or sew for his and Marion's business, Teddy joins Cate on her farm for manual labor, since her husband has been sick since returning from war. Teddy agrees to Marion's plea to keep Peggie on, as long as Marion agrees to never raise prices. As Marion and Peggie continue to work together, they grow closer - as do Cate and Teddy.

While getting ready for work one day, Teddy finds a hole in his sock - and notices his hand is suddenly steady. Alone, he attempts to mend the sock - and does so flawlessly. In an almost panic, he rips the perfect stitch open and throws the socks to the side.

Later that day, after completing a wedding gown together, Marion and Peggie celebrate, and share a single glass of Moonshine. This leads to the two almost kissing, but Peggie rejects Marion. Marion, distraught, leaves in a hurry, with the excuse that she must deliver a pair of socks to Teddy - grabbing the pair Teddy ripped that morning. At Cate's farm, Marion arrives breathless, socks in hand. She confronts Cate and orders Teddy to put on the socks. He eventually complies, and sends Marion away.

Teddy gets home that night to Marion waiting for him. In a panic, she asks him to sew a repair on a red blouse, in hopes that he can return to working at home. Teddy purposefully sews terribly. Marion sees this, but pretends he did it perfectly. Marion insists Teddy stop working on the farm with Cate and return home now that 'his hands are better.' The two continue to deceive each other and their friends, as Teddy continues to sew terribly -on purpose- and Marion replaces his work with that of Peggie’s - whom she insists works from her own house (Teddy thinks she has been fired a second time). Things come to a terrible head when Peggie’s mother dies, and she discovers she’s been fixing Teddy’s shoddy work.

Meanwhile, Marion visits Cate to apologize for taking Teddy away. Cate, in a fit of rage, assaults Marion with a kiss, then confesses that she envies Marion's life and marriage. Teddy discovers that Cate’s husband, Andrew, is not sick, but depressed. He tells Teddy the story of having fallen in love with a man during the war who died. Andrew explains that while he was dishonorably discharged, he is satisfied at having discovered who he really is. Teddy confesses he feels lost, and Andrew kisses him. Teddy draws back, and leaves.

Finally, Peggie confronts Teddy and gives him a new pair of glasses - her mother's. She reveals to him that Marion never lowered prices and never fired her - she was the one that was fixing his stitching. Marion arrives to see Teddy having this revelation. He leaves, and Peggie and Marion have a fight. Then, Marion kisses Peggie: passionately, romantically. Peggie confesses her love, but ultimately rejects Marion and leaves.

Overlooking the sunset, Marion and Teddy come to an understanding, and share a kiss.

== Cast ==
- Georgia Morgan as Marion Henry
- Hayleigh Hart Franklin as Peggie Darrow
- Brooke Elizabeth as Cate Wills
- Colin Henning as Teddy Henry
- Monica Rae Summers Gonzalez as Claudette
- Aaron J. Stewart as Andrew
- Annie McLean as Bethany

== Production ==
The film was shot on location in Western North Carolina.

== Release ==
Appalachian Dog was released Friday, March 21, 2025 by Buffalo 8 Distribution.

== Themes and Representation ==
Appalachian Dog incorporates themes of queerness within its Appalachian setting. In an interview with The Dominion Post, director Colin Henning discussed the inclusion of LGBTQ+ elements in the film. He stated, "I'm a gay filmmaker. My partner helped me produce the movie. He also was the editor on it. So obviously, that's a huge part of who I am. And I really wanted to have a story that depicts queer people with nuance, where they are not always making the best decisions, but that's not really directly correlated to the fact that they are queer." He notes the importance to "interweave a queer aspect into it pretty seamlessly, in a way that really is just about who these people are, whether they already know who they are, or they're discovering who they are."

In an interview with LRM Online, producer Chad Hylton discussed the film's exploration of queer identity from a historical perspective. He notes that audiences often view history as disconnected from contemporary experiences, but emphasizes that "people have always felt these feelings," even without modern vocabulary. Director Colin Henning added that the film's depiction of queer identity contributes to its timeless quality, stating that he finds it meaningful to see how contemporary queer audiences interpret those themes.

== Reception ==
Critical Response

Appalachian Dog received critical acclaim. Matthew Roe of Film Threat drew comparisons to Tennessee Williams's A Streetcar Named Desire, describing the film as "a ballet of personalities, where the efforts of those attempting to be the most domineering end up directly leading to the sharpest and most tragic of downfalls." Virginia Schneider of The Hollywood Times called the film "a stunning debut release," adding that while "most indie filmmakers struggle to successfully produce an original, thematic and impactful story, C.H. Squared has nailed the formula." Richard Gray of The Reel Bits noted that the film "carves out a distinct corner of the world it inhabits," and praised its deliberate pacing and persistent and understated tension. He wrote, "Henning marks himself as a voice to watch, and it will be interesting to see what he does next." Sabrina Kiddo of Countdown City Geeks called the film "an astonishing dramatic indie film," stating, "if you are a true cinemaholic, you will appreciate this independent film." Debbie Lynn Elias of Behind the Lens described the film as "a sultry, post-WWII, Southern Gothic delight," and praised Henning as "already one of my favorite filmmakers of the next generation."

Performances

The performances in the film have garnered critical acclaim. Alise Chaffins of The Dominion Post praised the "slate of talented actors", writing, "There is longing, shame, secrecy, hope, and despair in each of these people, and the small cast is able to convey that well." Chris Jones of Overly Honest Reviews emphasized Hayleigh Hart Franklin's role as Peggie, which he described as adding "an essential layer of complexity" to the narrative. He notes that the "nuanced exchanges between Marion and Peggie—particularly one symbolic moment involving lipstick left behind on a glass—create poignant undertones without resorting to overly explanatory dialogue. This restrained storytelling gives viewers emotional space to interpret and appreciate characters' unspoken feelings, revealing Henning's talent for crafting impactful moments from quiet interactions." Jones also commended Colin Henning's performance as Teddy, writing that Henning and co-star Georgia Morgan delivered "a sincere and effective depiction of personal battles fought far from any actual warzone." Mark Lakatos of Take 2 Indie Review described Henning's portrayal as "like watching a powder keg on screen, with the fuse already lit."

Cinematography and Sound Design

The cinematography and sound design in Appalachian Dog received critical acclaim. Aidan Macaluso's visual work was noted for its symbolic use of space and composition, while the sound design by Chad Hylton was praised for enhancing the film's emotional and psychological atmosphere. J. Zimmerman of Video Librarian described the cinematography as "a treat of composition," noting that the staging contributed significantly to the film's dramatic effect.

Overly Honest Reviews characterized the visual style as "nothing short of remarkable," highlighting the use of theatrical framing and environmental symbolism to reflect the characters' emotional entrapment. The review emphasized that elements such as windows and doorways were frequently used to enhance the sense of psychological confinement.

Take 2 Indie Review also praised the cinematography, writing: "Take any frame of the wilderness and hang it on your wall; that's how striking the imagery is."

Matthew Roe of Film Threat commended both Macaluso's and Hylton's contributions, describing the cinematography as "an increasingly claustrophobic journey of tilted angles and frames-within-frames." Roe also highlighted the sound design's use of natural elements—such as wind, water, and animal sounds—blended with ambient droning to create a haunting soundscape. According to Roe, this approach lent even the quietest scenes an underlying tension, blurring the line between domestic drama and psychological thriller, writing, "I wasn't sure if I was about to watch a 'coming home' narrative where post-trauma knocks against the tides of change or was about to experience some creeping horror story where people violently lose their minds in the woods."
