= Improvement (disambiguation) =

Improvement is the process of a thing moving from one state to a state considered to be better.

Improvement also may refer to:

- Business process improvement
- Continual improvement
- Kaizen, a Japanese-style continuous business improvement
- Focused improvement
- Home improvement, the process or result of improving the efficiency, livability, or market value of a personal dwelling
- Improvement commissioners, a form of government in 18th-century Britain
- Improvement Era, magazine of the Church of Jesus Christ of Latter-day Saints published from 1897 to 1970
- Improvement trust
- Land improvement
- Natural vision improvement, a regimen developed by William Horatio Bates for improving human vision
- Performance improvement
- Preemphasis improvement
- Quality improvement

== See also ==
- Emendation (taxonomy), a scientific change to the name of a living organism
- Improvement and Development Agency, a British governmental agency established in 1998
- Improvement district (disambiguation)
