= Almeda Lambert =

American cookbook writer and businessperson (1863–1921)

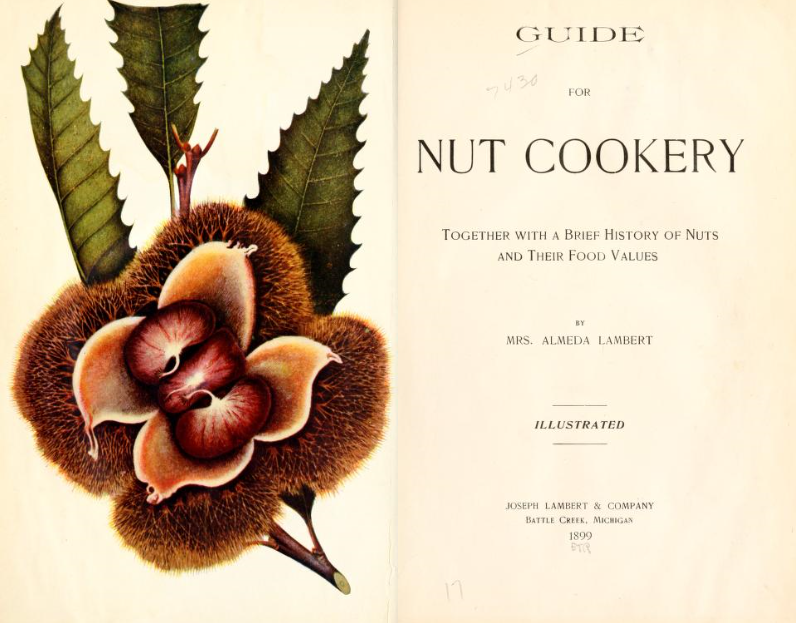
- Title page of Guide for Nut Cookery, 1899
- Born: Almeda Maria West; September 9, 1863; Marquette County, Wisconsin, U.S.
- Died: March 13, 1921 (aged 57); National City, California, U.S.
- Resting place: Mount Hope Cemetery, San Diego
- Occupations: Cookbook writer; businessperson
- Notable work: Guide for Nut Cookery (1899)
- Spouse: Joseph Lambert (m. 1890)
- Children: 1

Almeda Lambert (Note: Her first name is sometimes recorded as Almeeta.) (born Almeda Maria West; September 9, 1863 – March 13, 1921) was an American cookbook writer and businessperson. A Seventh-day Adventist, she wrote Guide for Nut Cookery: Together with a Brief History of Nuts and Their Food Values (1899), a vegetarian cookbook devoted to nut-based foods. Later food-history sources have described the book as containing about 1,000 recipes and as an early source for recipes including dairy-free ice cream, non-dairy eggnog, and boiled peanuts. Lambert and her husband, Joseph Lambert, were associated with the early commercial production of peanut butter in the United States through the Lambert Nut Food Co. and related businesses that made nut products and sold nut-processing machinery.

== Biography ==
=== Early life and family ===
Lambert was born Almeda Maria West in Marquette County, Wisconsin, on September 9, 1863. She was a Seventh-day Adventist.

In 1890, she married Joseph Lambert of Battle Creek, Michigan, a former machinist who by the mid-1890s had invented a grinder for making peanut butter. The couple had one daughter and later separated or divorced.

=== Guide for Nut Cookery ===
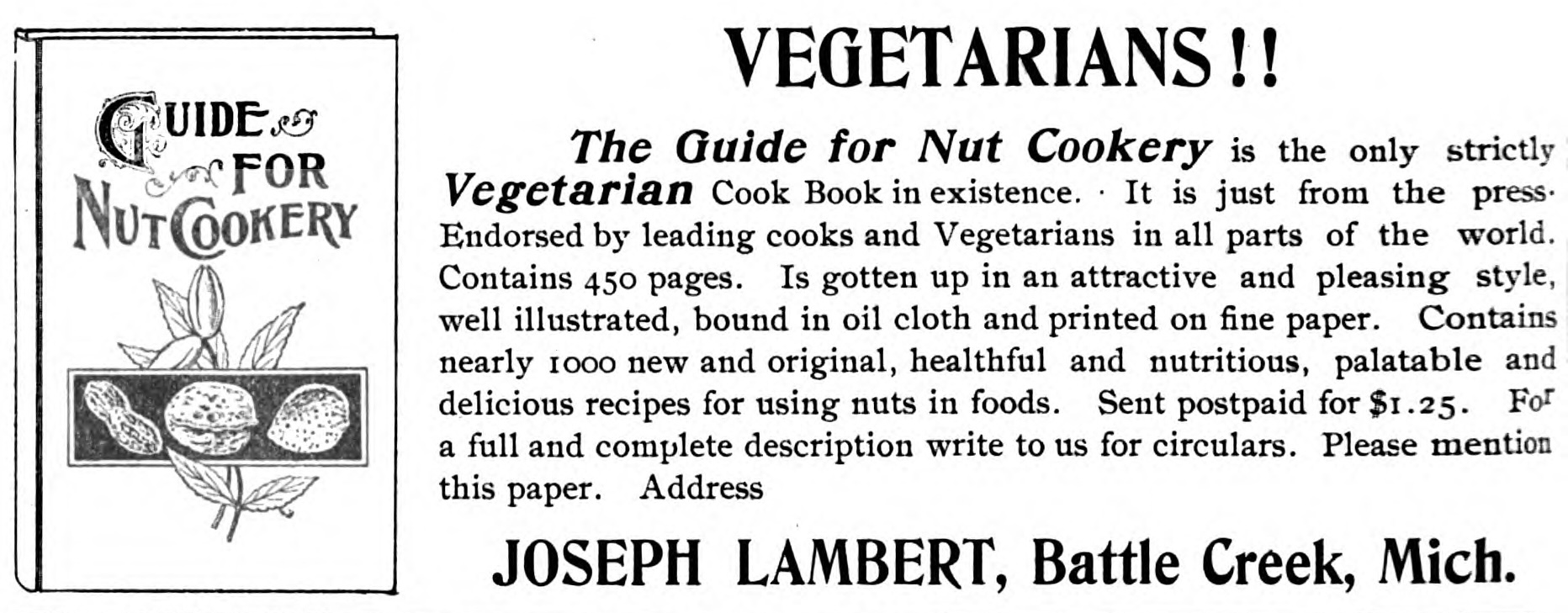
Advertisement for Guide for Nut Cookery, 1899

Lambert published Guide for Nut Cookery: Together with a Brief History of Nuts and Their Food Values in 1899. In the introduction, she wrote:

It is the object of the author to place before the public a book treating upon the use of nuts as shortening, seasoning, etc., to be used in every way in which milk, cream, butter or lard can be used, and fully take their place.

==== Contents and recipes ====
Andrew F. Smith has described Guide for Nut Cookery as the first American cookbook devoted to cooking with nuts. It contains about 1,000 nut-based recipes, many of which had not previously been published.

The recipes include pecan butter, nut milk, rolls, sausages, gravy, pea-and-pecan puree, pie crust, and mince pie. Lambert also provided instructions for preparing meat substitutes, including "Nutora" and "Nutmeato", made from nut butters and cornstarch. These were used for mock dishes including turkey legs, roast turkey, lobster, goose, cutlets, and trout. She described using sticks of macaroni as turkey leg bones and potato slices as the fins and tail of the trout. The book included photographs of these preparations.

Food-history sources have identified Guide for Nut Cookery as an early source for dairy-free ice cream recipes using nut milks and butters in place of cow's milk and cream. It has also been cited as a source for early recipes for non-dairy eggnog and boiled peanuts.

==== Reception ====
An 1899 review in Food, Home and Garden described the book as a detailed, illustrated work on vegetarian cookery, with an emphasis on using nuts as substitutes for meat and dairy. The reviewer noted the number of recipes and the discussion of combining nuts, grains, fruits, and vegetables, and commented on the book's price of $1.25.

==== Later discussion ====
Later accounts have discussed the book as evidence of nut-based cookery among American vegetarians in the late 19th century. Smith compares its use of nut-based foods with later vegetarian cookbooks, including the second edition of Ella Eaton Kellogg's Science in the Kitchen and E. G. Fulton's Vegetarian Cook Book: Substitutes for Flesh Foods.

=== Business ventures ===
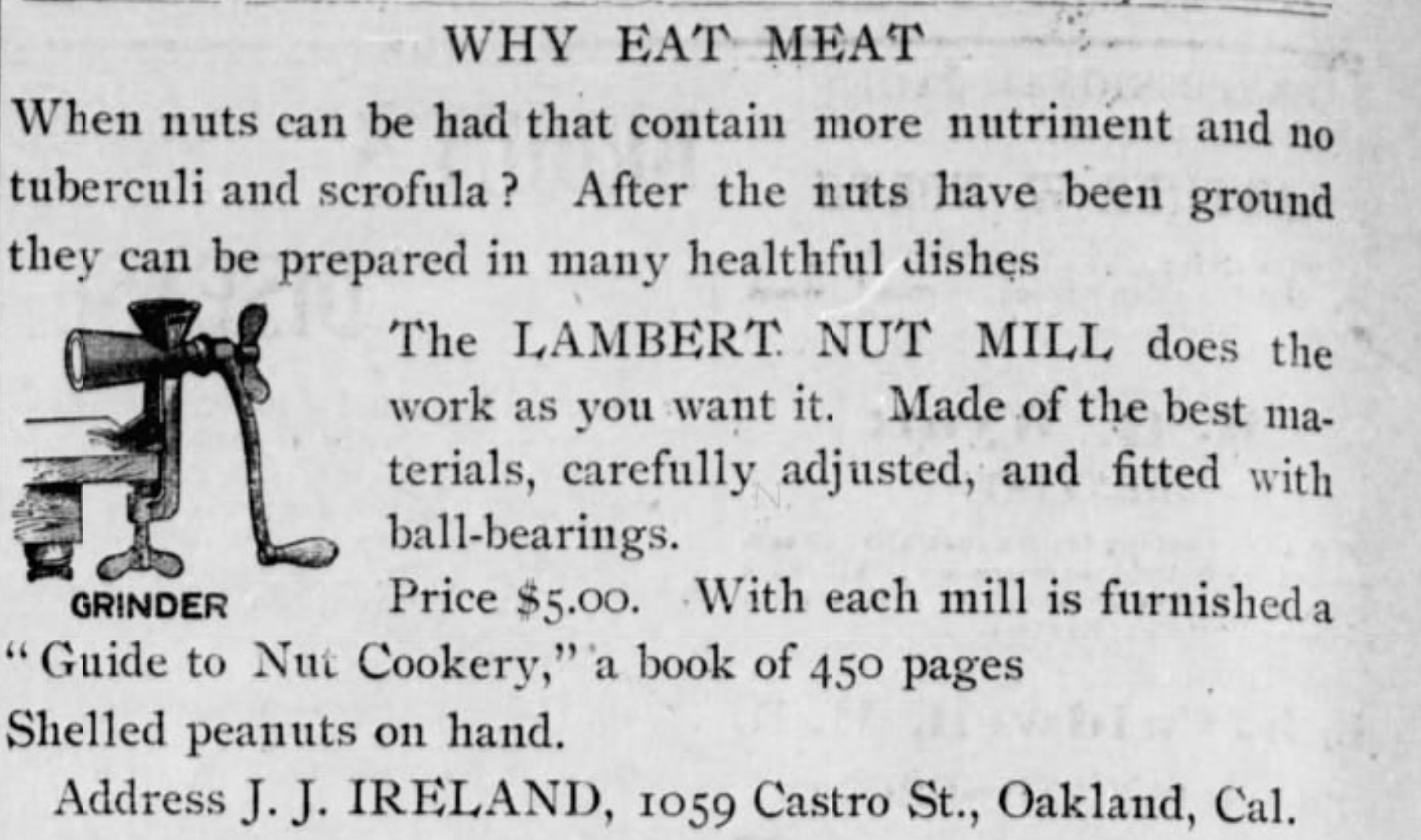
Advertisement for the Lambert Nut Mill, 1900

Lambert and her husband Joseph were involved in the early commercial production of peanut butter in the United States. The Lambert Nut Food Co. was incorporated in 1900 and produced peanut butter crackers, nut products, and nut-processing machinery.

The Lambert Good Food Co. was incorporated in 1901 and sold similar products. The business moved its factory to Marshall, Michigan, in 1902 and was dissolved in 1930.

=== Death ===
Lambert died aged 57 on March 13, 1921, at Paradise Valley Sanitarium in National City, California, where she had been receiving treatment before an operation. According to a contemporary report, the procedure revealed tubercular problems in her intestines and was not completed. Lambert had lived in Escondido for about 20 years.

Her funeral was held on March 15 in San Diego, and she was buried at Mount Hope Cemetery.

== Publications ==
- Guide for Nut Cookery: Together with a Brief History of Nuts and Their Food Values. Battle Creek, Michigan: Joseph Lambert & Company. 1899.
