= Used Cars =

1980 film by Robert Zemeckis

- Theatrical release poster
- Directed by: Robert Zemeckis
- Written by: Robert Zemeckis; Bob Gale
- Produced by: Bob Gale
- Starring: Kurt Russell; Gerrit Graham; Frank McRae; Deborah Harmon; Joseph P. Flaherty; David L. Lander; Michael McKean; Harry Northup; Woodrow Parfrey; Michael Talbott; Jack Warden
- Cinematography: Donald M. Morgan
- Edited by: Michael Kahn
- Music by: Patrick Williams
- Production company: A-Team Productions
- Distributed by: Columbia Pictures
- Release date: July 11, 1980
- Running time: 113 minutes
- Country: United States
- Language: English
- Budget: $8 million
- Box office: $11.7 million

Used Cars is a 1980 American satirical black comedy film co-written and directed by Robert Zemeckis. The story follows Rudy Russo (Kurt Russell), a devious salesman, working for affable, but monumentally unsuccessful used-car dealer Luke Fuchs (Jack Warden). Luke's principal rival, located directly across the street, is his more prosperous brother, Roy L. Fuchs (also played by Warden), who is scheming to take over Luke's lot. The film also stars Deborah Harmon and Gerrit Graham, and the supporting cast includes Frank McRae, David L. Lander, Michael McKean, Joe Flaherty, Al Lewis, Dub Taylor, Harry Northup, Dick Miller, and Betty Thomas.

Steven Spielberg and John Milius acted as executive producers on the project, while the original musical score was composed by Patrick Williams. Filmed primarily in Mesa, Arizona, the film was released by Columbia Pictures on July 11, 1980.

Although a modest box-office success at the time, it has since developed cult film status due to its dark, cynical humor and the Zemeckis style. It was marketed with the tagline, "Like new, great looking, and fully loaded with laughs."

== Plot ==
Rudy Russo is a young and cunning car salesman in Mesa, Arizona, with aspirations of running for the state senate. He works at the struggling New Deal used car lot owned by the elderly Luke Fuchs, who agrees to invest $10,000 in Rudy's campaign if he promises to keep the business alive. Across the street Luke's twin brother and arch-competitor Roy L. Fuchs is desperate to keep his used car lot from being demolished and replaced by a proposed freeway exit. Wanting to collect life insurance money and New Deal from Luke, Roy hires his mechanic, demolition derby driver Mickey, to recklessly drive Luke's pristine, hand-restored 1957 Chevrolet Bel Air around the block with Luke in the passenger's seat.

Shortly after crashing the classic car into the lot, Luke dies of a heart attack, leaving Rudy with firm evidence that Roy staged the "accident". In an attempt to prevent Roy from gaining any inheritance, Rudy has his superstitious co-worker Jeff and mechanic Jim help him bury Luke on the dealership's back lot in a vintage Edsel that was once New Deal's sign ornament. When Roy comes looking for Luke the next day, they lie that Luke took the Edsel on a vacation to Miami.

The following night, Rudy and his friends make a live cut-in broadcast of their commercial into the middle of a major network football game. It goes awry when Jeff finds out the car on display is red (he believes all red cars are bad luck) and female model Margaret has her dress stuck on the hood ornament, which exposes her when the hood is popped open. The commercial results in New Deal receiving a massive number of new customers the next day. When Roy lures customers to his lot by hiring circus animals, Rudy counters with a live stripper show. Luke's estranged daughter Barbara Jane visits the lot in hopes of reuniting with her dad, having dropped out of college more than 10 years before to live on a hippie commune. Rudy conceals the truth about her father by taking her out on a date and inadvertently convinces her to stay in town.

Rudy's gang broadcasts another commercial in the middle of Jimmy Carter's presidential address, destroying some of Roy's used cars in the process, most notably his prized Mercedes SL. In retaliation, Roy storms into New Deal and attacks Jeff, before discovering Luke's resting place in the backlot. Roy brings the police to New Deal the next day to dig up the lot, but Jim has taken the Edsel out of the pit, placed Luke's corpse in the driver's seat, and rigged the car to crash into a power transformer, where it explodes as planned. Everyone believes Luke was killed in the fiery accident, and any evidence to the contrary is destroyed. Roy believes he now has possession of New Deal, but Rudy points out that Barbara, as Luke's daughter, is effectively the new owner.

Immediately after the explosion, Barbara arrives to the lot, having heard about the fiasco over her father's death. When Rudy refuses to tell her the whole truth, Barbara fires Rudy, Jeff, and Jim for their cover-up scheme. As a final means of shutting down New Deal before the property seizure, Roy has his connections in local television station KFUK re-edit Barbara's commercial to imply that she has "a mile of cars", while also pushing a trumped-up charge of false advertising. Rudy's luck changes when he wins a bet on a football game, guaranteeing him enough money for his campaign. Once he discovers that Barbara is being prosecuted for false advertising, Rudy convinces her to tell the court she actually has a mile of cars. To avoid a charge of perjury, she must prove it in front of the judge by having more than 250 cars on her lot by 2:45 pm that afternoon.

Rudy spends his investment on 250 cars purchased from Manuel, a Mexican wholesaler. He also buses in 250 student drivers to deliver the cars to New Deal's lot in less than two hours. After overcoming Roy's attempt at disrupting the resulting convoy and Jeff's superstition of driving a red car, the drivers arrive just in time. The total measurements are just long enough to equal a mile of cars, saving Barbara and the car lot. Roy's former attorney informs Rudy and Barbara that once the freeway ramp across the street is constructed, New Deal will become the largest dealership in the state. Everyone celebrates, except Roy, who is taken away into custody for contempt in front of the judge. Rudy and Barbara embrace each other in a kiss.

== Cast ==
- Kurt Russell as Rudy Russo
- Jack Warden as Roy L. Fuchs / Luke Fuchs
- Gerrit Graham as Jeff
- Frank McRae as Jim
- Deborah Harmon as Barbara Jane Fuchs
- Joe Flaherty as Sam Slaton
- David L. Lander as Freddie Paris
- Michael McKean as Eddie Winslow
- Michael Talbott as Mickey
- Harry Northup as Carmine
- Alfonso Arau as Manuel
- Cheryl Rixon as Margaret
- Al Lewis as Judge H. H. Harrison
- Woodrow Parfrey as Mr. Chertner
- Dub Taylor as Tucker
- Wendie Jo Sperber as Nona "Nervous Nona"
- Marc McClure as "Heavy Duty" Dubois
- Andrew Duncan as Charlie
- Betty Thomas as Bunny
- Dick Miller as Man In Bed
- Rita Taggart as Woman In Bed
- Terence Knox as Reese
- Will McMillan as Police Sergeant

== Production ==
=== Development ===
The idea for Used Cars originated from producer John Milius, who pitched it to Bob Gale and Robert Zemeckis while they were writing the script for 1941 (1979), the film directed by Steven Spielberg. Milius said that he and Spielberg had hoped to one day write a story about a used car salesman based outside Las Vegas.

=== Casting ===
They had wanted to cast actor George Hamilton as Kurt Russell's character, Rudy. Universal Pictures passed on the film, leading the duo to take it to Columbia Pictures. Frank Price, the studio president at the time, had sold used cars as a young man, and he quickly said yes. According to Bob Gale, Jack Warden had initially passed on the role of Roy Fuchs, but agreed to play the role under the condition that he be able to play Luke Fuchs, since he was interested in playing the role of both brothers. John Candy was originally cast as Sam Slaton, but dropped out due to scheduling conflicts with 1941 and was replaced with Joe Flaherty. Sperber and McClure would go on to portray brother and sister in the Back To The Future film series.

=== Filming ===
Used Cars was shot in 29 days at the working Darner Chrysler-Plymouth dealership in Mesa, Arizona on Main Street and Extension, from November to December 1979. The dealership served as the setting for "Roy L. Fuchs Pre-owned Automobiles", while a vacant lot across the street served as the setting for "New Deal Used Cars". The vacant lot now has an apartment complex, while the Chrysler bankruptcy of 2009 caused the Darner dealership to lose its Chrysler affiliation.

== Release ==
=== Home media ===
Shout! Factory re-released Used Cars on Blu-ray February 26, 2019 through their Shout! Select branch. The film had been previously released by Columbia TriStar Home Entertainment on January 1, 2002, as a Region 1 DVD with audio commentary by Robert Zemeckis, Kurt Russell, and Bob Gale. The film was released August 12, 2019 as a Region B Blu-ray by Eureka Entertainment Ltd., a division of their Eureka Classics product line.

== Reception ==
=== Box office ===
Used Cars grossed $11.7 million in North America.

=== Critical response ===
On review aggregator Rotten Tomatoes, the film holds an approval rating of 78% based on 32 reviews, with an average score of 6.60/10. The website's critical consensus reads, "Robert Zemeckis' pitch-black satire of American culture doesn't always hit the mark, but it's got enough manic comic energy to warrant a spin." On Metacritic, the film received a score of 68 based on 11 reviews, indicating "generally favorable reviews".

However, early reviews were mixed. The Washington Post's Gary Arnold dubbed it "a mean, spirited farce [...] Director/co-writer Robert Zemeckis has undeniable energy and flair, but it's being misspent on pretexts and situations that seem inexcusably gratuitous and snide." A staff reviewer for Variety wrote that "What might have looked like a great idea on paper has been tackled by filmmakers who haven’t expanded it much beyond the one joke inherent in the premise." They too praised Zemeckis' direction as "undeniable vigor, if insufficient control and discipline." Roger Ebert of the Chicago Sun-Times gave the film two out of four stars, saying the film is "filled with too many ideas, relationships, and situations with plot overkill."

Among the positive reviews, Dave Kehr of the Chicago Reader found it to be a "fierce, cathartically funny celebration of the low, the cheap, the venal—in short, America." Vincent Canby of The New York Times wrote, "...a movie that has more laughs in it than any film of the summer except Airplane! It wipes out...just about every other recent comedy aimed, I assume, at an otherwise television-hooked public." Pauline Kael of The New Yorker described Cars as "an American tell-tale movie in a Pop Art form" and "a classic screwball fantasy — a neglected modern comedy that’s like a more restless and visually high-spirited version of the W. C. Fields pictures."

At the time, Used Cars received the highest ratings in test screenings in Columbia Pictures history. In 2015, film critic and historian Leonard Maltin said, "I loved Used Cars, and I'll never understand really why that didn't become more." Zemeckis and Gale blamed the film's failure on Columbia, who moved the film up a month from its scheduled release date based on the test-screening response. It debuted with little advance marketing and was released only one week after Airplane!.
