= Improvement =

Process of a thing moving from one state to a state considered to be better

A drawing of a man pointing to a graphing showing an improvement in sales numbers.

Improvement is the process of a thing moving from one state to a state considered to be better, usually by a change or addition that improves. The concept of improvement is important to governments and businesses, as well as to individuals.

== History of the concept ==
The term "improvement" in general means "gradual, piecemeal, but cumulative betterment", which can refer to both individuals and societies as a whole. The term "improvement" historically referred to land improvement, the process of making wildland more suitable for human uses, particularly the cultivation of crops. Agricultural writers contrasted "improvement" with the traditional custom that governed farming practices at the time. The belief in agricultural "improvement" was the belief that the earth could be made more fruitful. More specifically, it was the belief that "the knowledge of nature would allow the best possible use of resources". It emerged in late medieval England and later shaped the colonies of the British Empire, through what Richard Drayton describes as "enlightened imperialism". The British believed "that they ultimately knew better than those on the ground".

This limited agricultural use of the term changed in the 17th century, when "its metaphoric range was extended to include a host of social and political reforms aimed at growth, development, or perfection". In short order, the term "improvement" became "nothing less than shorthand for the civilizing process", and thereafter "played an important role in eighteenth- century European debates over the foundations of social order". Friedrich Nietzsche criticized this concept of "improvement" in his notes published in The Will to Power, asserting that it created a false and self-serving sense of human superiority over nature, and that the "civilizing" of man was actually a "softening".

In the 20th century, the concept of improvement expanded even further. Businesses developed philosophies of having a continual improvement process, wherein all activities of the business are constantly examined to weed out inefficiencies and better ways of carrying out tasks. At the same time, the concept of an individual self-improvement blossomed, leading to "tremendous growth in self-help publishing [and] self-improvement culture", wherein people assessed their lives in much the same way. Home improvement, the process or result of improving the efficiency, livability, or market value of a personal dwelling, has also become a substantial industry.

Sarah Tarlow, a professor of archaeology, has argued that the idea of “improvement” is so familiar to us today that it seems natural. It is therefore difficult to fully understand the history of “improvement” as a concept and to appreciate that it was a genuinely new way of thinking in the early modern period. Furthermore, in contemporary use, the notion of “improvement” is assumed to be positive. This assumption has limited the critical attention given to the history of the idea and the practices associated with it. For example, the enclosure of common land for private use was understood as an “improvement” in the eighteenth century. But this had both positive and negative effects for the different people involved. The poor family who were denied a crucial means of subsistence did not regard the newly enclosed fields as “better”.

=== In business ===
Many theories and practices exist with respect to improvement in business. For example, business process improvement is a systematic approach to help an organisation optimise its underlying processes to achieve more efficient results. One such approach is focused improvement, the ensemble of activities aimed at elevating the performance of any system, especially a business system, by working on eliminating its constraints one by one while not working on non-constraints. Performance improvement focuses on measuring the output of a particular business process or procedure, then modifying the process or procedure to increase the output, increase efficiency, or increase the effectiveness of the process or procedure. Quality improvement is one of the four aspects of the concept of quality management. A crucial component of professional development is evaluation. Recently, we have seen a push for evaluation systems to be used to sort and fire teachers—a supposed quick fix, but one that ignores the vast majority of dedicated educators. To be effective, an evaluation system must identify strengths and weaknesses, so that all teachers can get the necessary support to improve their practice.

Your commitment and ability to improve defines your potential which is of interest to anyone who is a customer, employer, stakeholder as like a craftsman his ability to improve represents the marked improvement in his work from one to the next.

=== In government ===
Governments often use language proposing an improvement of processes or areas. In some places a business improvement district or tourism improvement district may be incorporated into urban zoning, with the enactment of laws intended to benefit businesses that are established in the area. An improvement trust, a type of legal trust created for the improvement of something, may be settled for the benefit of a municipal area.

== See also ==
In government

- Improvement commissioners, a form of government in 18th-century Britain
- Improvement and Development Agency, a British governmental agency established in 1998
- Improvement districts of Alberta, a type of rural municipality

Other

- Improvement Era, the magazine of the Church of Jesus Christ of Latter-day Saints published from 1897 to 1970
- Natural vision improvement, a regimen developed by William Horatio Bates for improving human vision
- Preemphasis improvement, the improvement in the signal-to-noise ratio of the high-frequency portion of the baseband in FM broadcasting
- In taxonomy, improvement is used as a synonym for emendation, a scientific change to the name of a living organism made to remove spelling and style errors
