= Improvement district =

Improvement district may refer to:

- Business improvement district, a type of urban zoning
- Improvement districts of Alberta, a type of rural municipality
- Tourism improvement district, a type of urban zoning
