= Boiled peanuts =

Method of preparing fresh peanuts as a snack food

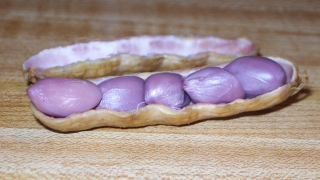
South Carolina boiled peanuts in the shell

Boiled peanuts are popular in some places where peanuts are common. Fully mature peanuts do not make good quality boiled peanuts; rather, raw or green ones are used. Raw denotes peanuts in a semi-mature state, having achieved full size but not being fully dried, as would be needed for roasting or peanut butter use. Green denotes freshly harvested and undried peanuts that must be refrigerated. After boiling in salt water they take on a strong salty taste, becoming softer with prolonged cooking, and somewhat resembling a pea or bean, to which they are related because they are legumes and a nut only in the culinary sense.

The most flavorful peanuts for boiling are the Valencia type. These are preferred in the United States, being grown in gardens and small patches throughout the South. Green Virginia-type peanuts are also sometimes used.

== Regional variations ==
=== Southern United States ===
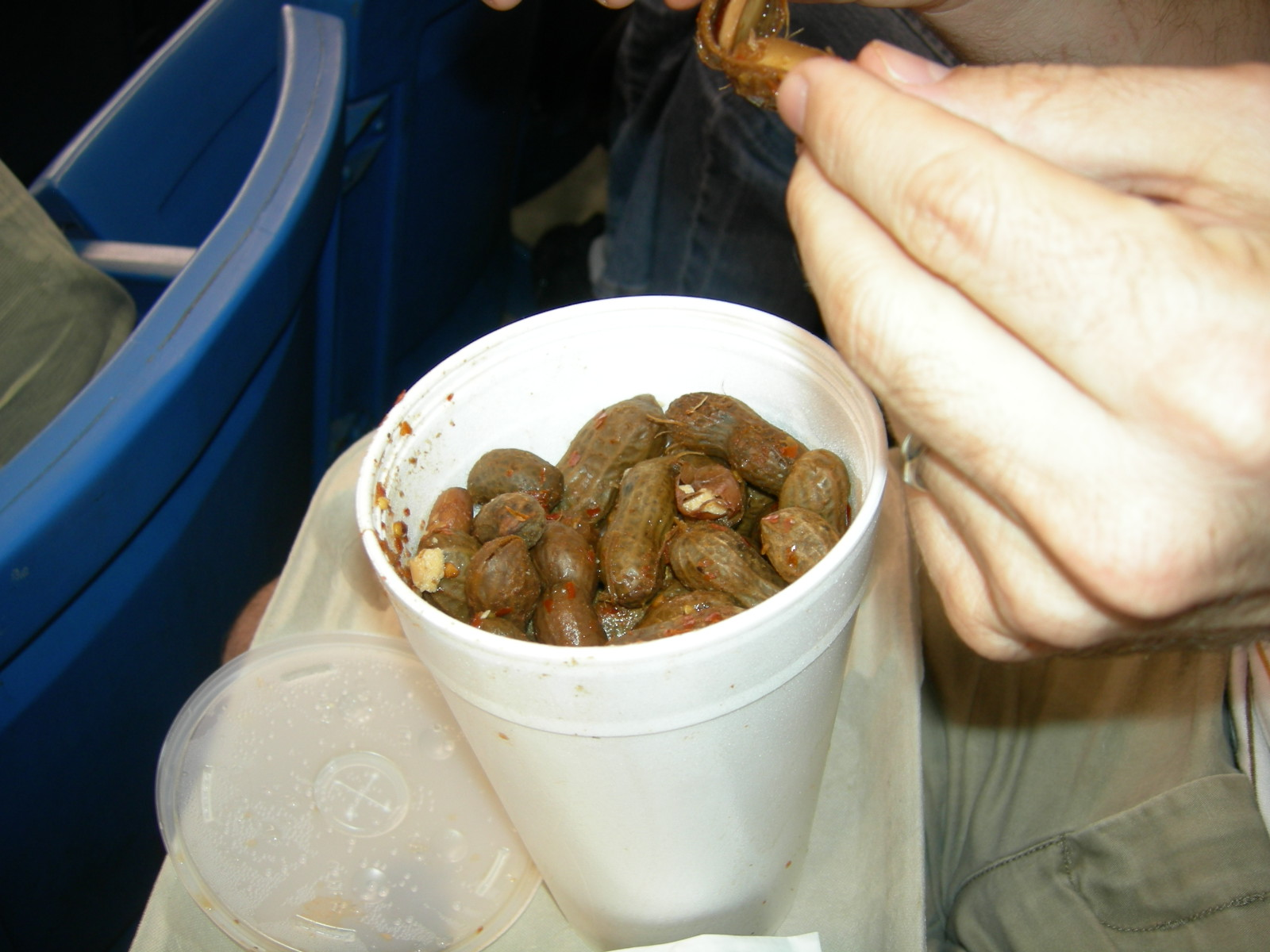
Cajun boiled peanuts are sold in the hull and are boiled with a piquant spice mixture.

Boiled peanuts are widely consumed and commercially available in an area of the Southern United States from North Carolina, south to central Florida, as far north as Ohio, and west to Mississippi. The peanuts are sold in the hull and boiled with only salt or with a piquant spice mixture such as Old Bay or Zatarain's. The latter are often called "Cajun boiled peanuts" in many recipes.

==== History ====
Boiling peanuts has been a folk cultural practice in the Southern United States, where they were originally called goober peas, since at least the 19th century. The practice of eating boiled peanuts was likely brought by enslaved black people from West Africa, where the related bambara groundnut is a traditional staple crop. In July and August, when the peanut crops would come in, unsold and surplus peanuts would be prepared in a boiling pot, and extended families and neighbors would gather to share conversation and food. Like a fish fry, peanut boils have been organizing principles for social gatherings. Like okra, fried green tomatoes, black-eyed peas, collard greens and pork barbecue, boiled peanuts are symbols of Southern culture and cuisine.

The first recipe for boiled peanuts was published by Almeda Lambert in 1899. Boiled peanuts became a mainstream commodity in the lower South in the early 20th century. A 1925 account from Orangeburg, South Carolina (where the food historian Andrew F. Smith believes the sale of boiled peanuts may have begun), mentions boys hawking the food as a snack for five cents per bag. The snack was also canned for consumption out of season.

==== Preparation ====
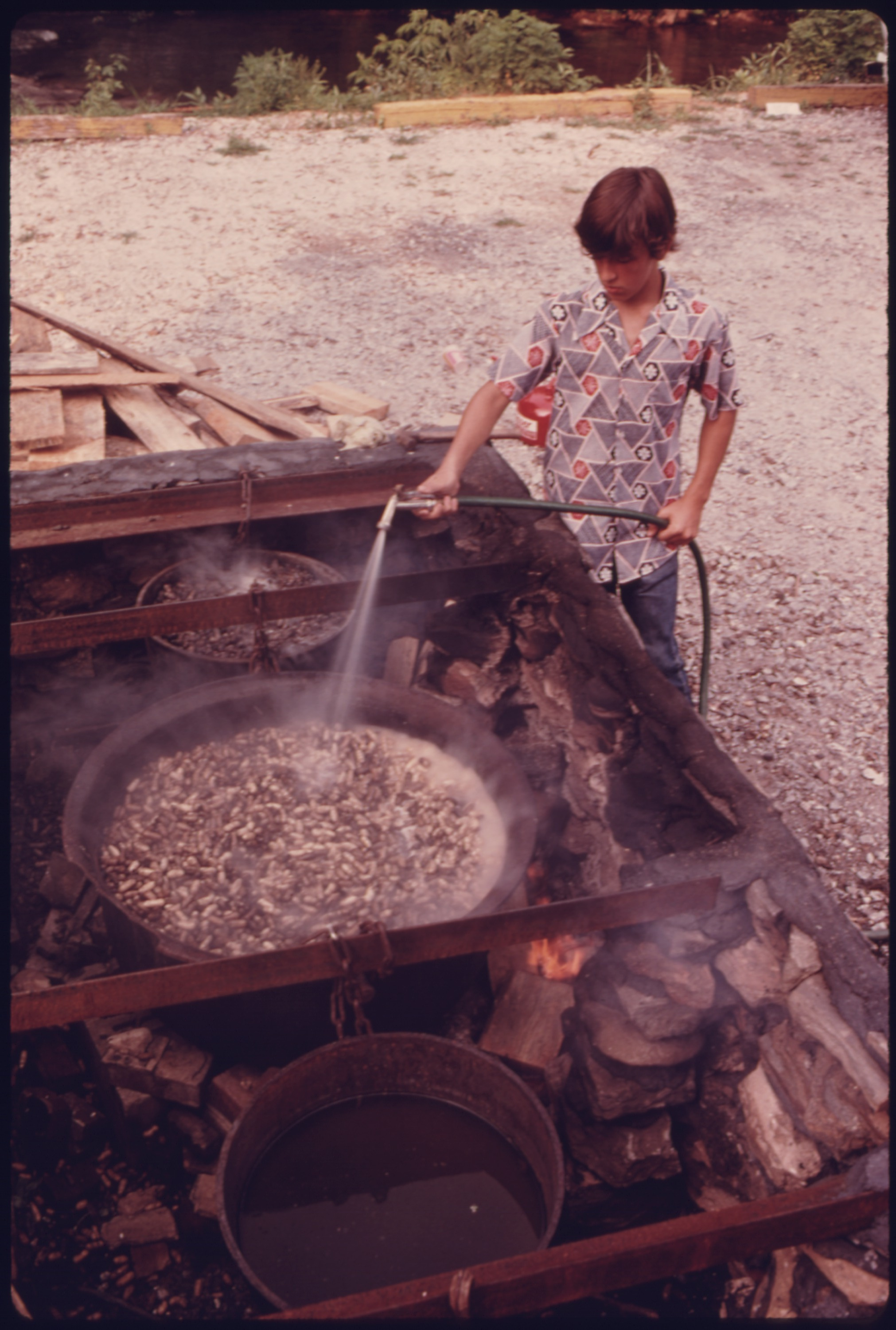
A boy preparing boiled peanuts in Helen, Georgia, c. 1974.

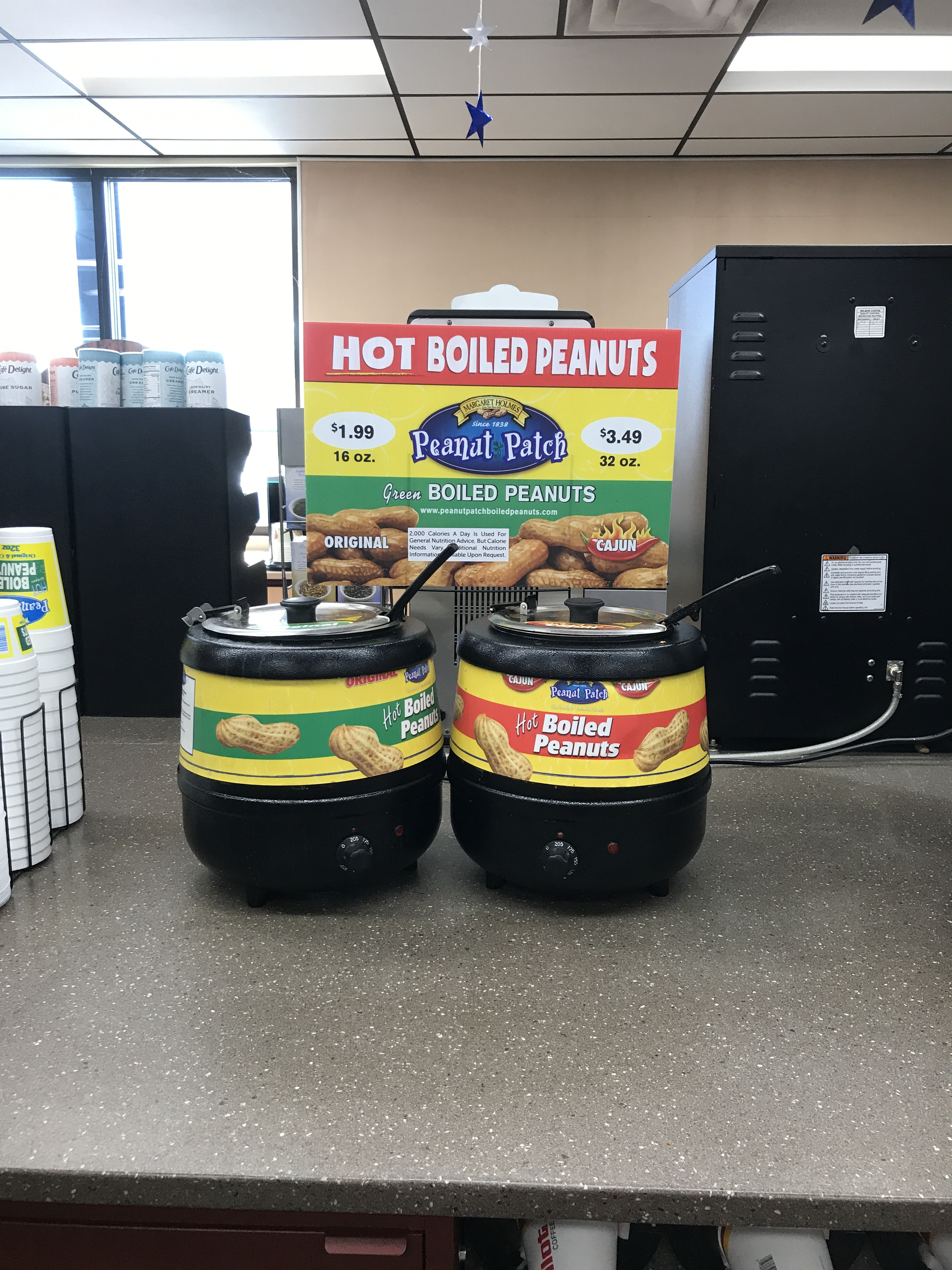
Prepared boiled peanuts for sale in a convenience store in South Carolina

Raw peanuts and green peanuts are generally used for boiled peanuts. A green peanut is a farm-fresh harvested peanut that has not been dehydrated. They are available from grocery stores, food distributors and farmers markets during the growing season. "Raw" peanuts are also uncooked but have been dried/dehydrated and must be rehydrated before boiling (usually in a bowl full of water overnight). Once rehydrated, the raw peanuts are ready to be boiled.

Raw peanuts in the shell are put in a large pot of very heavily salted water and boiled. This can be done inside on a stove, or outside on a propane burner or fire pit for a larger volume. Depending on the locality, some cooks use rock salt or standard table salt, or both. The boil can go on from four to seven hours or more, depending on quantity and the age of the peanut (green peanuts cook faster and tend to be better tasting), and the boilings will most often be of several gallons of water. Flavorings such as ham hocks, hot sauce, Cajun seasonings or beer can be added to the boil. An alternative method for dried raw mature peanuts is to rehydrate them by soaking overnight in water, after which they can be cooked in the conventional manner.

The resulting snack is a very soft peanut in the shell, invariably quite salty. The softened peanuts are easy to open. Often small, immature peanuts (called "pops") are included; these have even softer shells and can be eaten in their entirety. They tend to absorb more salt than the larger ones. Some aficionados of the dish prefer them cooked for a shorter period of time so that the nut is not as soft.

Boiled peanuts can become slimy or moldy quite quickly without refrigeration. Boiled peanuts can be frozen, then later reheated in a microwave or boiling water for out-of-season consumption. Properly frozen, the flavor is well maintained for even several years.

Boiled peanuts can also be canned and are available commercially.

==== Cultural importance ====
On May 1, 2006, Governor Mark Sanford signed a bill, H.4585, making boiled peanuts the official snack food of South Carolina.

=== Africa ===
In Ghana and Nigeria, boiled peanuts are eaten as street food. They are also popular in the KwaZulu Natal region of South Africa, especially in Durban.

Historically, the Bambara groundnut was eaten boiled much like a boiled peanut in much of Africa. Following the introduction of peanuts to Africa in the 16th century, they largely displaced the Bambara groundnut in cuisine.

=== Asia ===
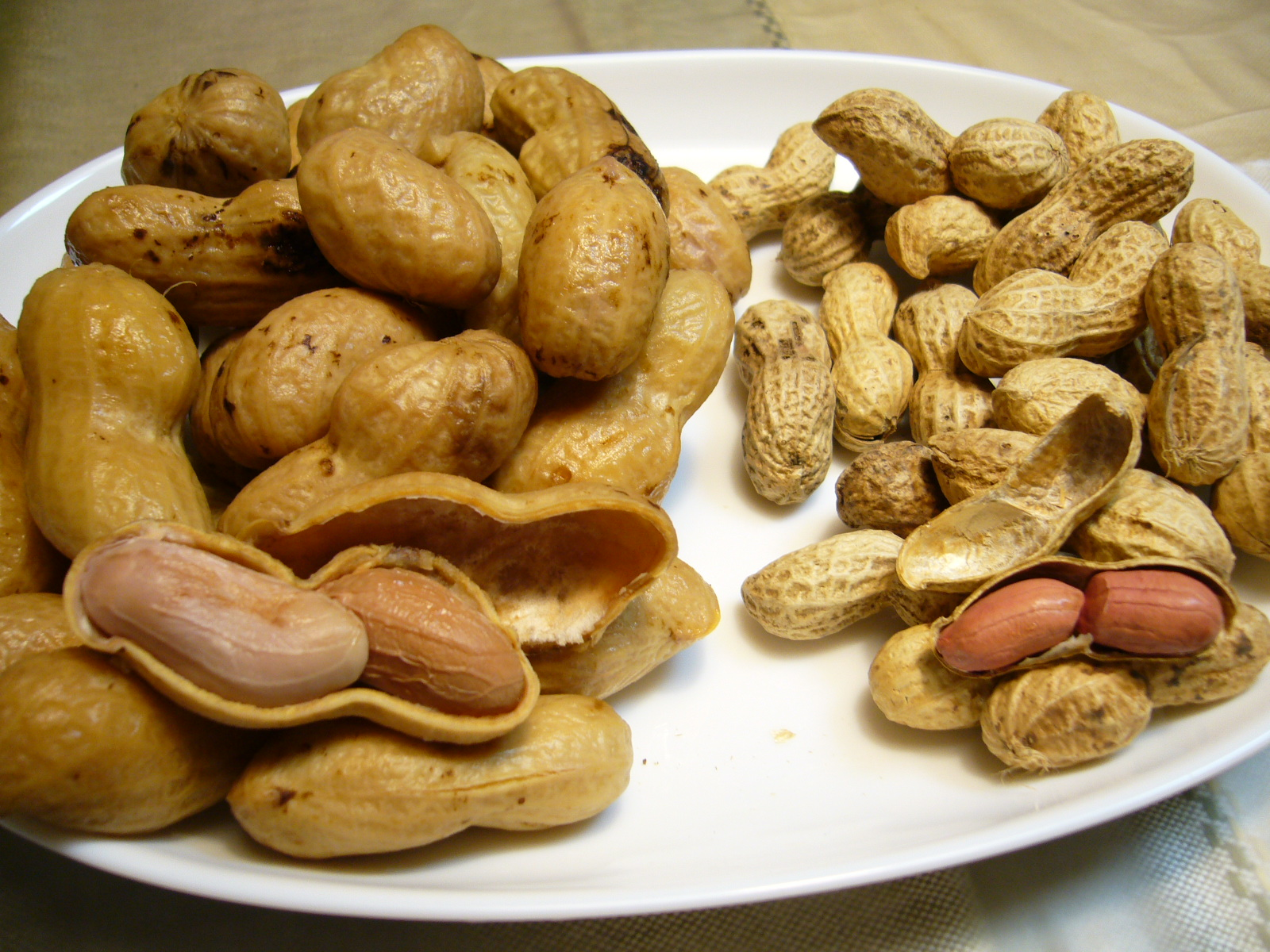
Boiled peanuts (prepared in Japan), left; roasted peanuts, right

In China, peanuts are generally boiled with a little salt, sometimes with star anise.

Boiled peanuts in Taiwan are called tǔdòu (土豆), although this also refers to peanuts boiled without the hulls such as those in peanut soup (tǔdòu tang 土豆湯). Boiled peanuts were traditionally sold in Taiwan by itinerant hawkers (rather than in fixed markets) or prepared in homes by boiling the peanuts in woks. With itinerant hawkers increasingly rare in the country, boiled peanuts in the shell are now seldom consumed.

In Vietnam, boiled peanuts are called đậu phọng luộc in the southern part of the country, and lạc luộc in the northern part of Vietnam. They are often appreciated by eating them at informal gatherings of friends and family while drinking beer poured over ice.

In Singapore, boiled peanuts are called 卤花生 or kacang rebus. 卤花生 is the Chinese version which is often boiled without the shell in dark soy sauce and Five spice.

In India, Indonesia, the Philippines and Thailand, boiled peanuts are eaten as street food.

=== Central and South America ===
Boiled peanuts have been eaten for thousands of years in South America. In Salvador, Bahia, boiled peanuts are eaten as street food.

Edward Long, in his 1774 History of Jamaica, notes the consumption of boiled peanuts on the island. This practice was likely brought by the enslaved black people from Africa, where Long himself mistakenly believed peanuts originated. Peanuts actually originated in South America and were cultivated before Columbus as far north as MesoAmerica before being introduced in other parts of the world after 1492.

== Potential health benefits ==
The process of boiling peanuts draws antioxidants from their shells. The boiled peanuts have four times the antioxidants of raw or roasted peanuts. Boiled peanuts have also been studied as a potential way to treat people with peanut allergies since boiling peanuts denatures proteins that trigger allergic reactions. In one study, boiled peanuts were given in increasing amounts to four patients over time. Some but not all patients were able to start eating raw peanuts.

== See also ==
- List of peanut dishes
- Cuisine of the Southern United States
