= National City, California =

City in California, United States

- City
- Cityscape

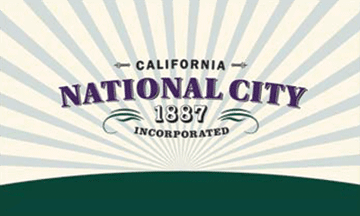
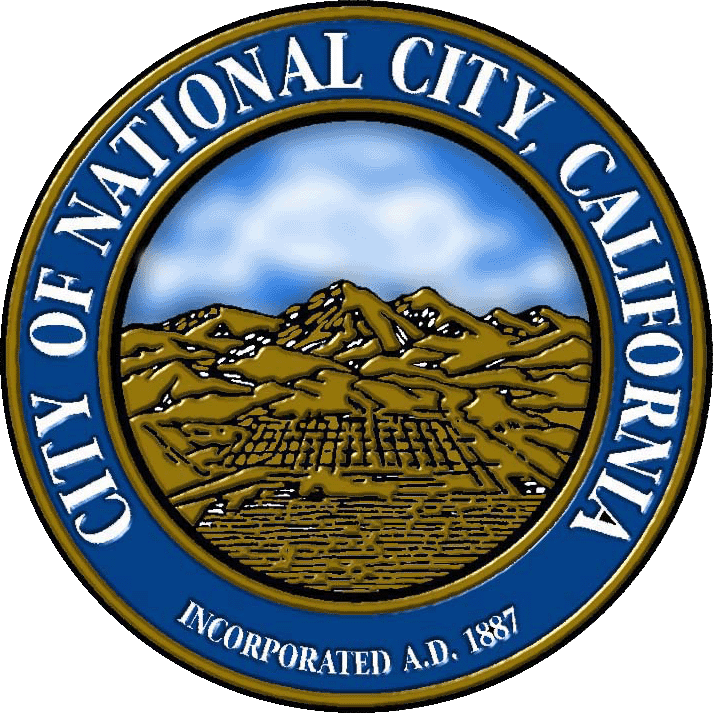
- Flag Seal
- Motto: "In the Center of It All"
- Interactive map of National City, California
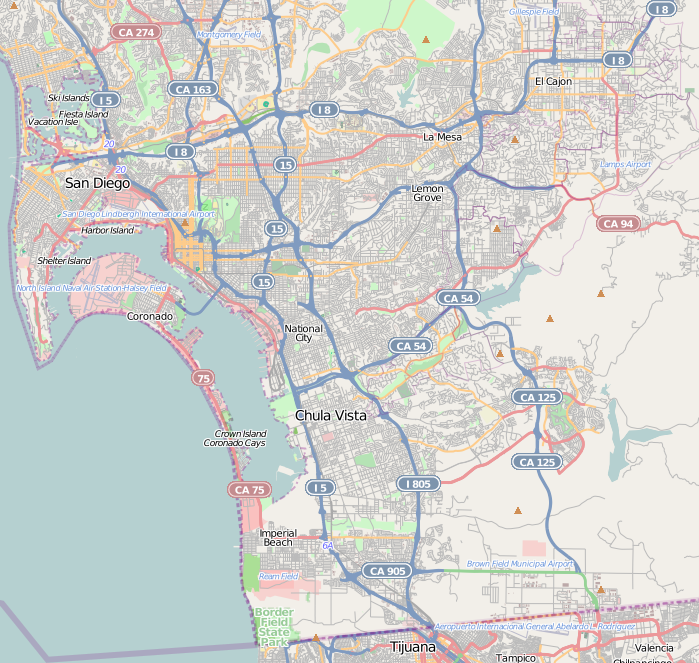
- Location in the United States National City (San Diego County, California) National City (southern California) National City (California) National City (the United States)
- Coordinates: 32°40′41″N 117°05′57″W
- Country: United States
- State: California
- County: San Diego
- Founded: July 7, 1868
- Incorporated: September 17, 1887

Government
  - Type: Council–manager
  - Mayor: Ron Morrison
  - City council: Marcus Bush; Luz Molina; Jose Rodriguez; Ditas Yamane
  - City clerk: Shelley Chapel
  - City manager: Doug Schulze

Area
  - Total: 9.12 sq mi (23.61 km^{2})
  - Land: 7.29 sq mi (18.89 km^{2})
  - Water: 1.83 sq mi (4.73 km^{2}) 20.17%
- Elevation: 66 ft (20 m)

Population (2020)
  - Total: 56,173
  - Density: 7,702/sq mi (2,974/km^{2})
- Time zone: UTC-8 (Pacific)
  - Summer (DST): UTC-7 (PDT)
- ZIP Code: 91950
- Area code: 619
- FIPS code: 06-50398
- GNIS feature IDs: 1661090, 2411216
- Website: nationalcityca.gov

National City is a city in the South Bay region of southwestern San Diego County, California, United States. The population was 56,173 at the 2020 United States census, down from 58,582 at the 2010 census. National City is the second-oldest city in San Diego County, having been incorporated in 1887.

== History ==
Human presence within the modern National City may have begun as early as 130,000 years ago, as allegedly evidenced at the Cerutti Mastodon site. Archaic period sites have been found along Sweetwater River which runs through the city limits of modern-day National City. Before the arrival of Spaniards, the area which modern day National City occupies was part of the territory of the Diegueño tribe, also known as Kamia, and later Kumeyaay. Later in the late eighteenth and early nineteenth century there was a Kumeyaay village, north of the modern National City boundaries, on Chollas Creek.

The Spanish named the 26,000 acres (11,000 ha) of land El Rancho del Rey (the Ranch of the King), used by Spanish soldiers to graze horses. After independence from Spain, in 1810, the Mexican government renamed it Rancho de la Nación (Ranch of the Nation). Governor Pío Pico granted Rancho de la Nación to his brother-in-law John (Don Juan) Forster in 1845. President Andrew Johnson, in issuing the land patent, listed the name as simply "The National Ranch", the English translation of the land grant name, "Rancho de la Nación".

In 1868, Frank Kimball and his brothers Warren and Levi, contractors and builders from San Francisco, purchased the entire rancho and thus began the foundation of the city, retaining the National name.

Frank Kimball first brought novelty and change to the area by building his personal residence. His home included a bathtub as well as hot running water, making it the first modern house in the entire county. However, it was more than his personal innovative endeavors that allowed the region to flourish. By constructing the first roads and railroad in what is now National City, Frank and his brothers most notably were responsible for introducing modern transportation to the residents of the community. The brothers also implemented the area's first post office and a wharf for sea-bound imports and exports. These large ventures, coupled with smaller personal missions, both contributed to the overall goal of creating a community unparalleled to the times. A lasting mark of the Kimballs was the trees they imported and planted from Europe and Asia, accomplished via a partnership with the U.S. Department of Agriculture. These trees can be found dotted throughout the city to this very day. It was the passion and influence of the Kimballs as well as other early pioneers that made way for the city's incorporation on September 17, 1887.

In the mid-20th century, businesses on National Avenue catered to the entertainment of sailors stationed at Naval Base San Diego, and became known as the "Mile of Bars". In the late 20th century, the city, seeking to end the association of the street with drinking culture, urged the growth of automobile dealerships, transforming the area to be known as the "Mile of Cars". Part of the change of business types was the closure of a Pussycat Theater in 1999. The last of the bars that was on the "Mile of Bars" was the Trophy Lounge, which lasted until at least 2004.

In the early 21st century, the city began to utilize eminent domain to create new developments; this met some criticism, to include on Reason TV in a video narrated by Drew Carey. One of the defining features of National City's past is the Victorian-style homes, many of which were built in the late 1800s. Brick Row is a prime example of how National City has preserved and brought old architecture into the modern world. Constructed by Frank Kimball in 1887, it was created to accommodate the railroad workers and lack of housing. In the 1970s Malcolm C. Greshler pitched the idea of creating Heritage Square in the heart of the city to showcase National City’s tourist attractions, it also acted as a way for people to visit National City's history, in the forms of museums, shops, and other ways these buildings could be repurposed. The National City general plan had listed around 66 historical sites that could be restored and preserved, Frank Kimball's interest in making National City in a western terminus for the Santa Fe Rail Way, was overlooked. So to commemorate Frank Kimball, they preserved his house and the Brick Row. Having a Heritage Square shows how National City has an important History that has to be shown to the public, along with the stories of the creators of these vintage buildings. In the end, Brick Row and Frank Kimball were major factors that impacted how National City has grown into the City it is today.

National City also became a focal point in immigration-related debates in the 21st century. On September 30, 2006, then-Mayor Nick Inzunza declared National City a sanctuary city, signaling limited cooperation with federal immigration enforcement. His proclamation, presented during dueling rallies at City Hall, followed a statement made on National Public Radio earlier that month and sparked considerable local controversy. After Ron Morrison was elected mayor in November 2006, he reversed this stance, stating publicly that the city would no longer identify as a sanctuary city. More than a decade later, on June 19, 2017, the City Council unanimously adopted a "Compassionate City" resolution in support of immigrants, marking a partial shift in tone and policy.

On January 22, 2024, National City experienced severe flooding due to an intense rainstorm that brought over 4 inches of rain in a few hours, overwhelming local stormwater systems. Low-lying neighborhoods, including the Happy Hollow Trailer Park, were particularly affected, with nearly half of its 90 mobile homes sustaining significant damage. Many residents, predominantly low-income and Spanish-speaking, lacked flood insurance, leading to prolonged displacement and financial hardship. In response to the disaster, President Joe Biden declared a Major Disaster for the region, enabling federal assistance for recovery efforts. Subsequently, some residents and business owners filed lawsuits against National City, alleging negligence in infrastructure maintenance contributed to the flooding.

== Geography ==
According to the United States Census Bureau, the city has a total area of 9.1 square miles (24 km^{2}). 7.3 square miles (19 km^{2}) of it is land and 1.8 square miles (4.7 km^{2}) of it (20.17%) is water. National City is bounded by San Diego to the north and northeast, Bonita to the southeast, and Chula Vista to the south across the Sweetwater River. San Diego Bay lies to the immediate west of the city. Also, within the boundaries of National City on the eastern side of town is the unincorporated area of San Diego County known as Lincoln Acres. National City is 15 minutes away from the US–Mexico Border (Tijuana).

National City has road access by the Interstate 5, Interstate 805, and California State Route 54, in addition to surface streets. National City Blvd, which once served as part of the historic U.S. Route 101, still serves as a north–south arterial street parallel to Highland Ave. Plaza Blvd and 30th Street/Sweetwater Road serve as east–west arterial routes. It has rail access through the San Diego Trolley's Blue Line. The nearest commercial airport is San Diego International Airport.

In 2012, National City was honored as the most walkable city in San Diego County. It currently holds a walk score of 71, among the highest scores for cities of similar size. However, its current score also puts National City among bigger cities like Seattle, Washington (74) and Portland, Oregon (66). San Diego's current walk score is 56.

=== Communities ===
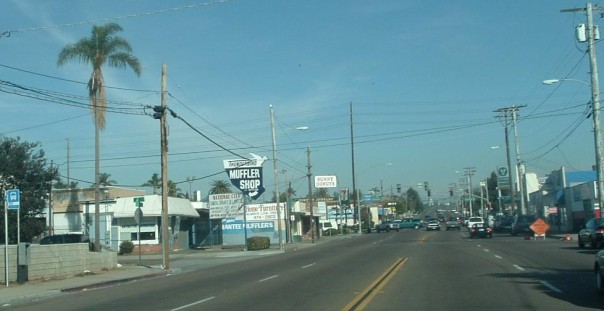
View of businesses along East 8th Street

Although there are no specific communities identified by the city of National City, certain areas have self-identified as communities. The Old Town community is bordered by McKinley Ave. (to the west) and National City Blvd. (to the east), and 24th Street (to the south) and 8th Street (to the north). While Lincoln Acres is an unincorporated area of San Diego County, it is located wholly within the boundaries of the incorporated city of National City and both share the postal code (91950). The South Port Business Center, an industrial park in which many businesses operate, is bordered by I-5 to the west, National City Blvd. to the east Mile of Cars Way (24th St.) to the north, and W. 28th St. to the south. The residents near Las Palmas and El Toyon Parks have neighborhood councils where they can voice their concerns with the city's elected officials.

The Neighborhood Council Program was developed in an effort to improve communication with the community and to bring services directly to National City residents. The program helps to unify neighbors to further enhance the image of the city, instilling civic pride into neighborhoods. Regular monthly meetings are held in each of the three Neighborhood Councils. Agenda topics are driven by resident requests, current events, and a desire by city officials to keep residents abreast of new programs and upcoming developments. Meetings are usually attended by police and fire officials, as well as members of the City Council.

Besides attending regular meetings, Neighborhood Council participants assist the city in improving their neighborhoods by volunteering during clean-up and beautification events and by helping to reduce crime. Residents also participate in family events sponsored by the Neighborhood Council Program such as National Night Out and Movies in the Park, as well as other city-sponsored events.

=== Climate ===
National City, California

Climate chart (precipitation, max. and min. temperature)
J	F	M	A	M	J	J	A	S	O	N	D
1.9 69 46	2.4 68 48	1.7 68 50	0.7 70 53	0.1 70 58	0.1 72 61	0 76 65	0 78 66	0.1 78 63	0.5 76 58	0.9 72 50	1.4 67 42
- █ Average max. and min. temperatures in °F
- █ Precipitation totals in inches
Metric conversion
J	F	M	A	M	J	J	A	S	O	N	D
49 21 8	60 20 9	43 20 10	18 21 12	2.3 21 14	1.8 22 16	0.8 24 18	0.3 26 19	3.6 26 17	13 24 14	23 22 10	36 19 6
- █ Average max. and min. temperatures in °C
- █ Precipitation totals in mm

National City's climate is characterized by warm, dry summers and mild winters, with most of the annual precipitation falling between December and March. The city has a mild climate year-round, with an average of 201 days above 72 °F (22 °C) and low rainfall (9–13 inches [23–33 centimetres] annually). Frequently, particularly during the "May gray/June gloom" period, a thick "marine layer" of cloud cover will keep the air cool and damp within a few miles of the coast.

On average, the warmest month is August. The highest recorded temperature was 108 °F in September 1988. On average, the coolest month is December. The lowest recorded temperature was 15 °F in April 2003. The maximum average precipitation occurs in February.

=== Ecology ===
Like most of Southern California and the San Diego County region, the majority of National City's current area was originally occupied by chaparral, a plant community made up mostly of drought-resistant shrubs. National City's broad city limits encompass the San Diego National Wildlife Refuge and the most northern area of the Sweetwater Marsh National Wildlife Refuge. The Sweetwater River runs from the Cuyamaca Mountains, through National City and Chula Vista via a flood control channel (natural route as opposed to a canal) and empties into San Diego Bay. Most of west National City is flat with an average elevation of 72 feet (22 m), which made it historically desirable and well suited for the Spanish to graze their horses. The eastern areas of National City tend to have canyons and ridges with an existing wildlife.

== Demographics ==
Historical population
Census	Pop.	Note	%±
1880	248		—
1890	1,353		445.6%
1900	1,086		−19.7%
1910	1,733		59.6%
1920	3,116		79.8%
1930	7,301		134.3%
1940	10,344		41.7%
1950	21,199		104.9%
1960	32,771		54.6%
1970	43,184		31.8%
1980	48,772		12.9%
1990	54,249		11.2%
2000	54,260		0.0%
2010	58,582		8.0%
2020	56,173		−4.1%
U.S. Decennial Census; 1860–1870 1880-1890; 1900 1910 1920; 1930 1940 1950; 1960 1970 1980; 1990 2000 2010; 2020

=== Racial and ethnic composition ===
National City city, California – Racial and ethnic composition Note: the US Census treats Hispanic/Latino as an ethnic category. This table excludes Latinos from the racial categories and assigns them to a separate category. Hispanics/Latinos may be of any race.
Race / Ethnicity (NH = Non-Hispanic)	Pop 2000	Pop 2010	Pop 2020	% 2000	% 2010	% 2020
White alone (NH)	7,653	6,872	4,470	14.10%	11.73%	7.96%
Black or African American alone (NH)	2,823	2,660	1,996	5.20%	4.54%	3.55%
Native American or Alaska Native alone (NH)	206	168	108	0.38%	0.29%	0.19%
Asian alone (NH)	9,863	10,401	10,813	18.18%	17.75%	19.25%
Native Hawaiian or Pacific Islander alone (NH)	399	413	275	0.74%	0.70%	0.49%
Other race alone (NH)	83	47	163	0.15%	0.08%	0.29%
Mixed race or Multiracial (NH)	1,180	1,110	1,262	2.17%	1.89%	2.25%
Hispanic or Latino (any race)	32,053	36,911	37,086	59.07%	63.01%	66.02%
Total	54,260	58,582	56,173	100.00%	100.00%	100.00%

=== 2020 census ===
As of the 2020 census, National City had a population of 56,173. The population density was 6,200 people per square mile (2,400 people/km^{2}). The median age was 35.6 years. 23.2% of residents were under the age of 18 and 14.3% of residents were 65 years of age or older. For every 100 females there were 92.9 males, and for every 100 females age 18 and over there were 89.9 males age 18 and over.

100.0% of residents lived in urban areas, while 0.0% lived in rural areas.

There were 16,882 households in National City, of which 40.9% had children under the age of 18 living in them. Of all households, 44.6% were married-couple households, 17.4% were households with a male householder and no spouse or partner present, and 31.1% were households with a female householder and no spouse or partner present. About 18.7% of all households were made up of individuals and 9.0% had someone living alone who was 65 years of age or older.

There were 17,689 housing units, of which 4.6% were vacant. The homeowner vacancy rate was 0.5% and the rental vacancy rate was 2.9%.

=== 2010 census ===
The 2010 United States census reported that National City had a population of 58,582. The population density was 6,426.7 inhabitants per square mile (2,481.4/km^{2}). The racial makeup of National City was 24,725 (42.2%) White (11.7% non-Hispanic White), 3,054 (5.2%) African American, 618 (1.1%) Native American, 12,402 (20.2%) Asian, 482 (0.8%) Pacific Islander, 3,638 (6.2%) from other races, 2,829 (4.8%) from two or more races and 16,175 (27.6%) Other. There were 36,911 residents of Hispanic or Latino ancestry, of any race (63.0%).

The Census reported that 52,830 people (90.2% of the population) lived in households, 5,341 (9.1%) lived in non-institutionalized group quarters, and 411 (0.7%) were institutionalized.

There were 15,502 households, out of which 7,402 (47.7%) had children under the age of 18 living in them, 7,376 (47.6%) were opposite-sex married couples living together, 3,437 (22.2%) had a female householder with no husband present, 1,300 (8.4%) had a male householder with no wife present. There were 959 (6.2%) unmarried opposite-sex partnerships, and 83 (0.5%) same-sex married couples or partnerships. 2,694 households (17.4%) were made up of individuals, and 1,226 (7.9%) had someone living alone who was 65 years of age or older. The average household size was 3.41. There were 12,113 families (78.1% of all households); the average family size was 3.79.

There were 14,939 people (25.5%) under the age of 18, 9,472 people (16.2%) aged 18 to 24, 15,892 people (27.1%) aged 25 to 44, 12,076 people (20.6%) aged 45 to 64, and 6,203 people (10.6%) who were 65 years of age or older. The median age was 30.2 years. For every 100 females, there were 105.5 males. For every 100 females age 18 and over, there were 106.5 males.

There were 16,762 housing units at an average density of 1,838.9 units per square mile (710.0 units/km^{2}), of which 5,197 (33.5%) were owner-occupied, and 10,305 (66.5%) were occupied by renters. The homeowner vacancy rate was 2.1%; the rental vacancy rate was 5.6%. 19,165 people (32.7% of the population) lived in owner-occupied housing units and 33,665 people (57.5%) lived in rental housing units.

=== 2000 census ===
As of the census of 2000, there were 54,260 people, 15,018 households, and 11,804 families residing in the city.

- Mexican: 53%
- Filipino: 19%
- Black or African American: 6%
- Other Hispanic or Latino: 5%
- German: 3%
- Irish: 2%
- English: 2%
- Italian: 1%
- American Indian tribes, specified: 1%
- French (except Basque): 1%
- Puerto Rican: 1%
- Japanese: 1%
- Scottish-Irish: 1%
- Subsaharan African: 1%
- Polish: 1%
- Russian: 1%
- Central American: 1%
- Greek: 1%

As of 2007, 19.5% of National City residents had incomes listed below the poverty level, a figure above the 12.4% California state average. In 2000, the estimated household income was $29,826. As of 2009, the estimated household income is $39,158, which is below the California state average of $59,958.

=== Crime ===
National City had, at some point through the 1980s, one of the highest homicide rates in all of Southern California. In 1993, the city had the second-highest violent crime rate in all of California. Crime was, in large part, one reason the city earned the moniker "Nasty City" and, through the late 1980s and early 1990s, it averaged roughly one homicide per month, which was significant, for a city of barely 50,000.

Although crime has dropped dramatically since the 1980s and 1990s, National City still has significant gang and drug activity, and has led San Diego County in crime through the 2000s. In a recent study among California cities with the highest violent and property crime rates over 2014–2016, National City ranked 9th, with a violent crime rate of 299.0 over that three-year period. More recent data from 2016 to 2020 shows that National City was at or near the top in overall crime, and at the top in violent crime per FBI index crime rate data by jurisdiction in San Diego County.

National City banned cruising in 1992. In 2022, the California State Assembly unanimously passed a resolution urging all remaining cities with bans to repeal them. National City repealed its ban on cruising in April 2023.

== Tourism ==
With tourism being a major industry in San Diego County, in January 2012, the National City Chamber of Commerce and National City lodging businesses formed the National City Tourism Marketing District as a benefit assessment district to help fund marketing and sales promotion efforts for city lodging businesses. The NCTMD includes all lodging business (hotels, motels and inns), existing and in the future, available for public occupancy located within the city limits boundaries. An annual assessment of 2.5% of gross short-term room rental revenue collected by lodging business goes to fund the NCTMD and its activities of promoting the safety and enhanced image of National City in order to increase tourism as well as to market National City as a tourist, meeting and event destination.

=== Top employers ===
According to the city's 2010 Comprehensive Annual Financial Report, the top employers in the city were:

#	Employer	# of employees
1	Paradise Valley Hospital	1,138
2	National Elementary School District	462
3	Sweetwater Union High School District	400
4	Wal-Mart	400
5	NMS Management	300
6	Dixieline Lumber	285
7	City of National City	275
8	Ball Automotive Group	250
9	Macy's	250
10	Motivational Systems, Inc.	245
11	Mossy Nissan	298

== Arts and culture ==
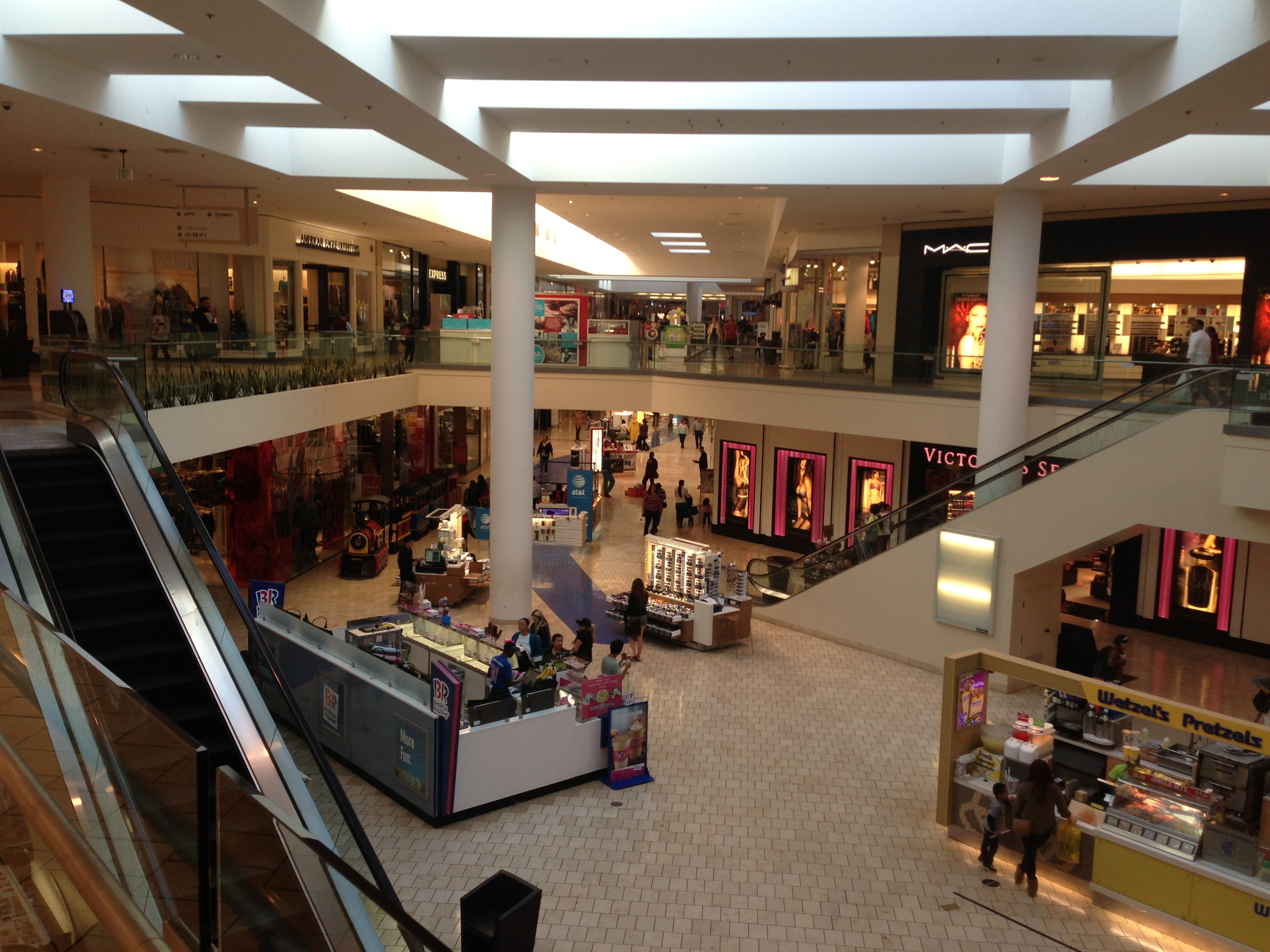
Inside the Westfield Plaza Bonita

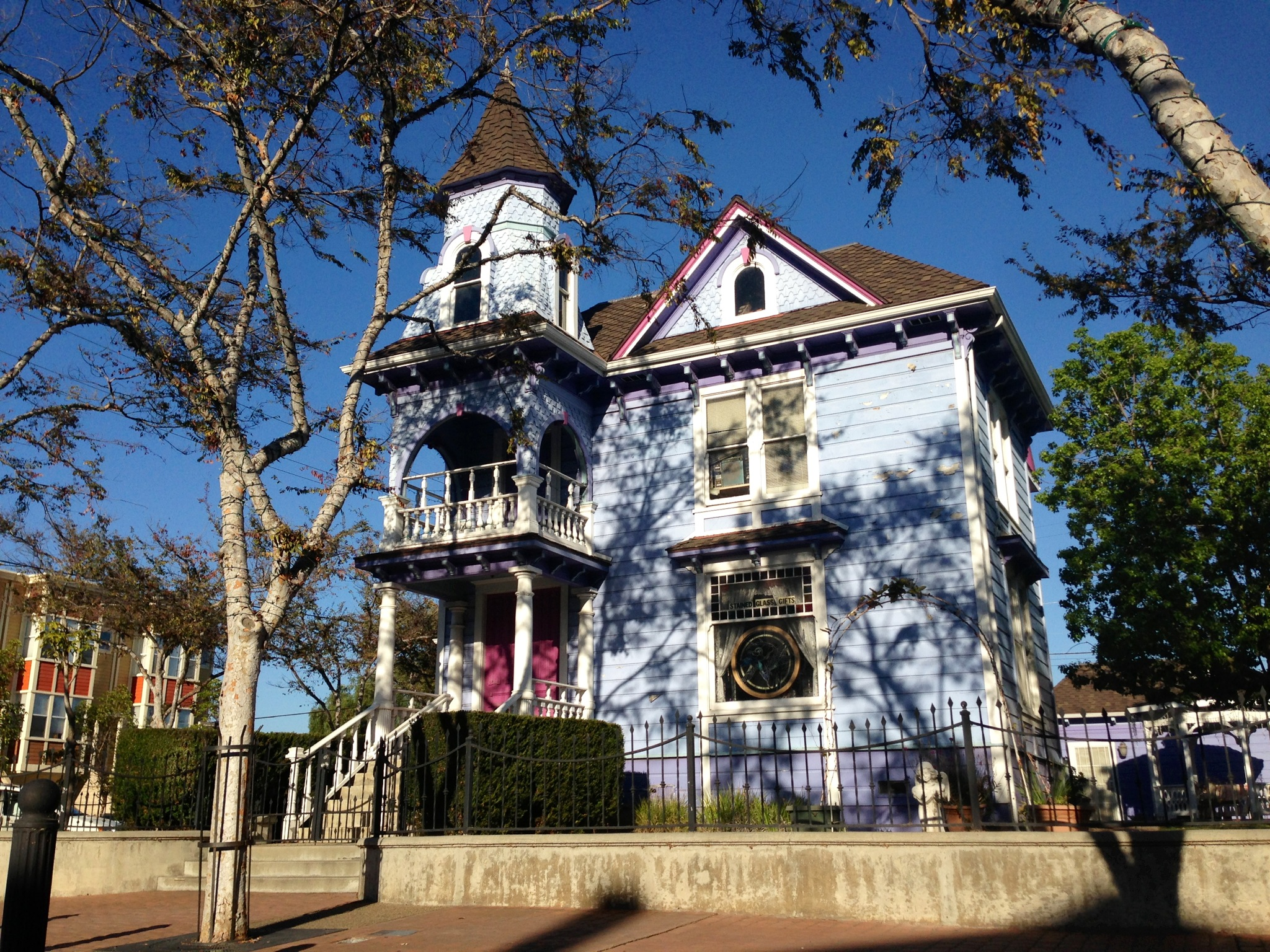
House in the Historic District, near the Mile of Cars

=== Museums and other points of interest ===
- The National City Mile of Cars is recognized as one of the first "auto malls" in the world.
- National City's three-mile port area (4.8 km) along San Diego Bay is part of Naval Base San Diego, the largest U.S. Naval base on the west coast.
- National City Depot - The National City California Southern Railroad Depot, built in 1882, served as the first Pacific Coast terminus station of the Santa Fe Railway system's transcontinental railroad. The station was the West Coast general office and figured prominently in Santa Fe's effort to break the economic and transportation monopoly of California held by the Central/Southern Pacific Railroads. The first transcontinental trains arrived in November 1885, resulting in one of the largest land booms in the history of California. Of the original five transcontinental railroad terminus stations, this unique Italianate designed station is the lone survivor. Location: 900 West 23rd St, National City. Listed as California Historical Landmark no. 1023.
- Westfield Plaza Bonita is a shopping mall in National City that attracts customers from all around the South Bay region of San Diego County. It is one of the only completely enclosed (all indoor) shopping malls in the county.
- Paradise Valley Hospital, a 301-bed acute care facility founded by Ellen White, an Adventist, in 1902 as Paradise Valley Sanitarium. The hospital is owned and operated by Prime Healthcare Services.
- Cafe La Maze (est. 1941) is recognized as one of National City's most historic restaurants.
- Highland Avenue: Car cruising route.
- Olivewood Gardens, the old Victorian style house that John T. Walton lived in.
- Brick Row on Heritage Square, 909 A Avenue: Designed by San Diego architect R. C. Ball (who designed Folsom Prison), it was constructed by Frank Kimball in 1887 for $30,000. These 10 individual row houses were to be used by the executives of the Santa Fe Railroad. This architectural style is unique to this region and was molded after the row houses of Philadelphia and similar eastern cities. It was hoped that the railroad VIPs would not only feel at home surrounded by familiar architecture, but also be impressed by the cosmopolitan appearance of the young city. All the apartments have a formal dining room with fireplace, a kitchen, a parlor with fireplace, a butler's pantry, and four bedrooms upstairs. Twelve-inch-thick (300 mm) interlocking brick walls divide the units. The brickwork on the row houses was laid with an artistic eye to break the severe lines of the long walls. The bricks above the second story are set upright at an angle. A one-story wooden porch runs the length of the building. Listed on the National Register of Historic Places, it now is an integral part of National City's Heritage Square. Each of the 10 units is privately owned and maintained; however, there is a protective covenant on the facade, so the exterior will always be in keeping with the Victorian surroundings.

== Government ==
In the California State Senate, National City is in the 18th senatorial district, represented by Democrat Steve Padilla. In the California State Assembly, it is in the 80th Assembly district, represented by Democrat David Alvarez.

In the United States House of Representatives, National City is in California's 52nd congressional district, represented by Democrat Juan Vargas.

Beginning in 2022, the city council will be elected by a district system rather than at-large, which was favored by Filipino American residents who believed their vote was diluted in the at-large system.

== Education ==
National City's 10 public elementary schools are within the National School District

Elementary schools

- Central
- El Toyon
- Ira Harbison: Blue Ribbon School 2006; California Distinguished School 2004
- John Otis
- Kimball: California Distinguished School 2004
- Las Palmas
- Lincoln Acres
- Olivewood
- Palmer Way
- Rancho de la Nación (formerly New Horizons School)

Charter schools

- Integrity Charter School, a K–8 Charter school
- The Charter School of San Diego (Plaza Bonita Mall)

National City's public middle and high schools are within the Sweetwater Union High School District

Middle school

- National City Middle School

Junior High school

- Granger Junior High School: California's 2010, 2013, 2016, 2019, 2020 Schools to Watch

High school

- Sweetwater High School

Private schools

- San Diego Academy: A Seventh-day Adventist K–12 school
- Faithful Ambassadors Bible Baptist Academy: PreK–12
- Gospel Light Christian School: PreK–12

== Libraries ==
In August 2005, the National City Public Library opened the doors of its newly built, 49,508 sq ft (4,599.4 m^{2}) state-of-the art facility. The library offers more than 160,000 books and has one of the largest computer centers in the State of California's public library system with over 60 computer units.

On December 18, 1884, Frank Kimball opened the city's first public library in his own home. In April 1884, the library was moved to the downstairs room of Granger Hall on National Avenue. In 1895, it was moved to the Boyd Block, currently McKinley and visually, 16th Street. From 1911 to 1954, National City operated its Carnegie Public Library in the present site of the National City Civic Center. The library operated in the present-day Art Center since 1954 until the opening of the new location in 2005.

The National City Public Library houses the Kile Morgan Local History Room which houses a significant number of original archives and manuscripts of the National City founding families, as well as maps, artifacts, high school yearbooks and scrapbooks.

== Notable people ==
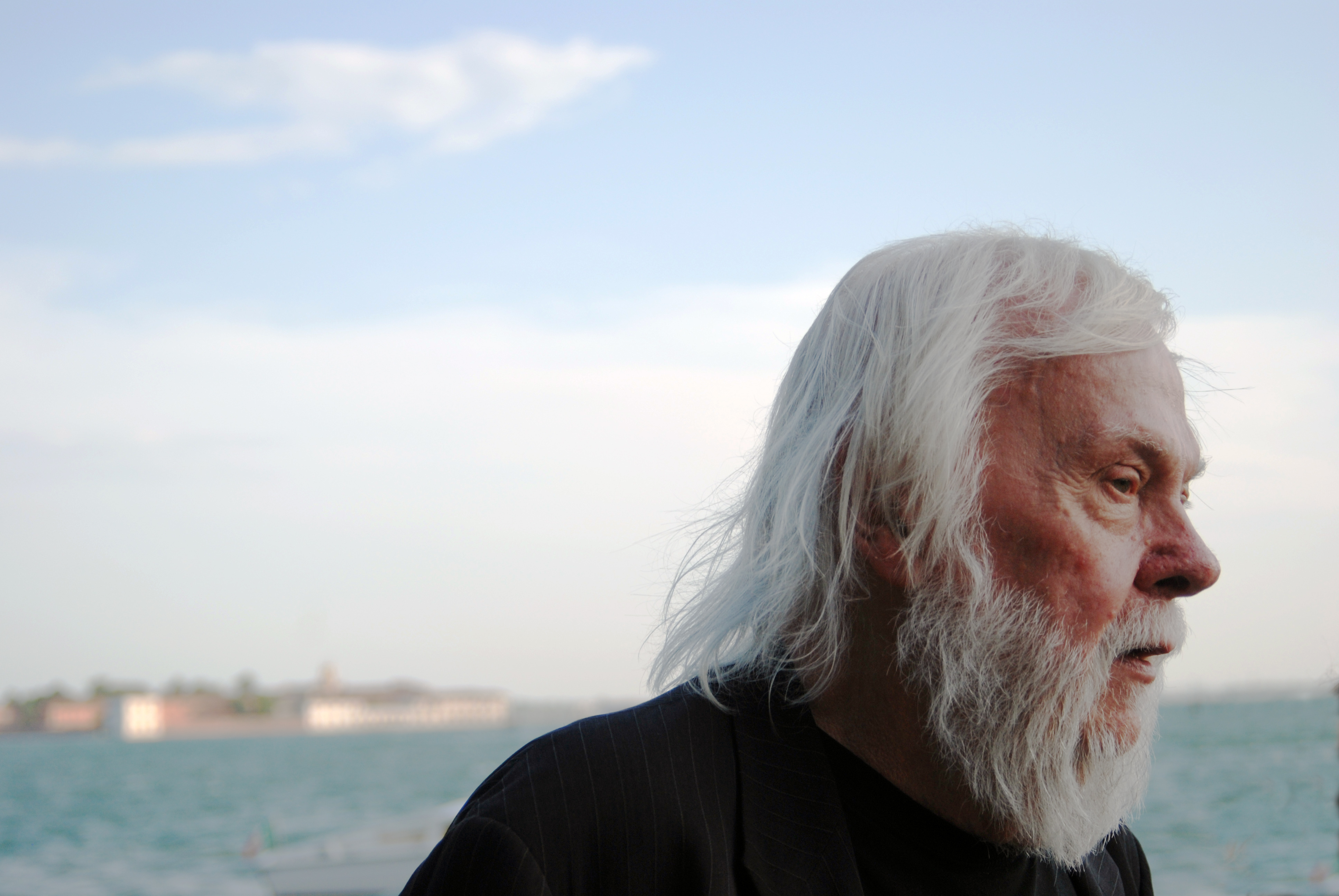
John Baldessari

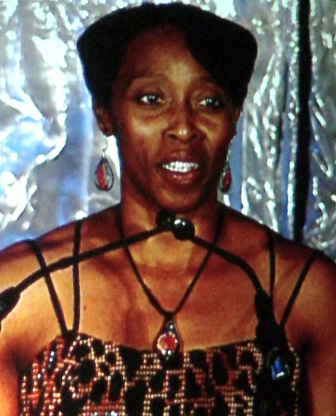
Gail Devers

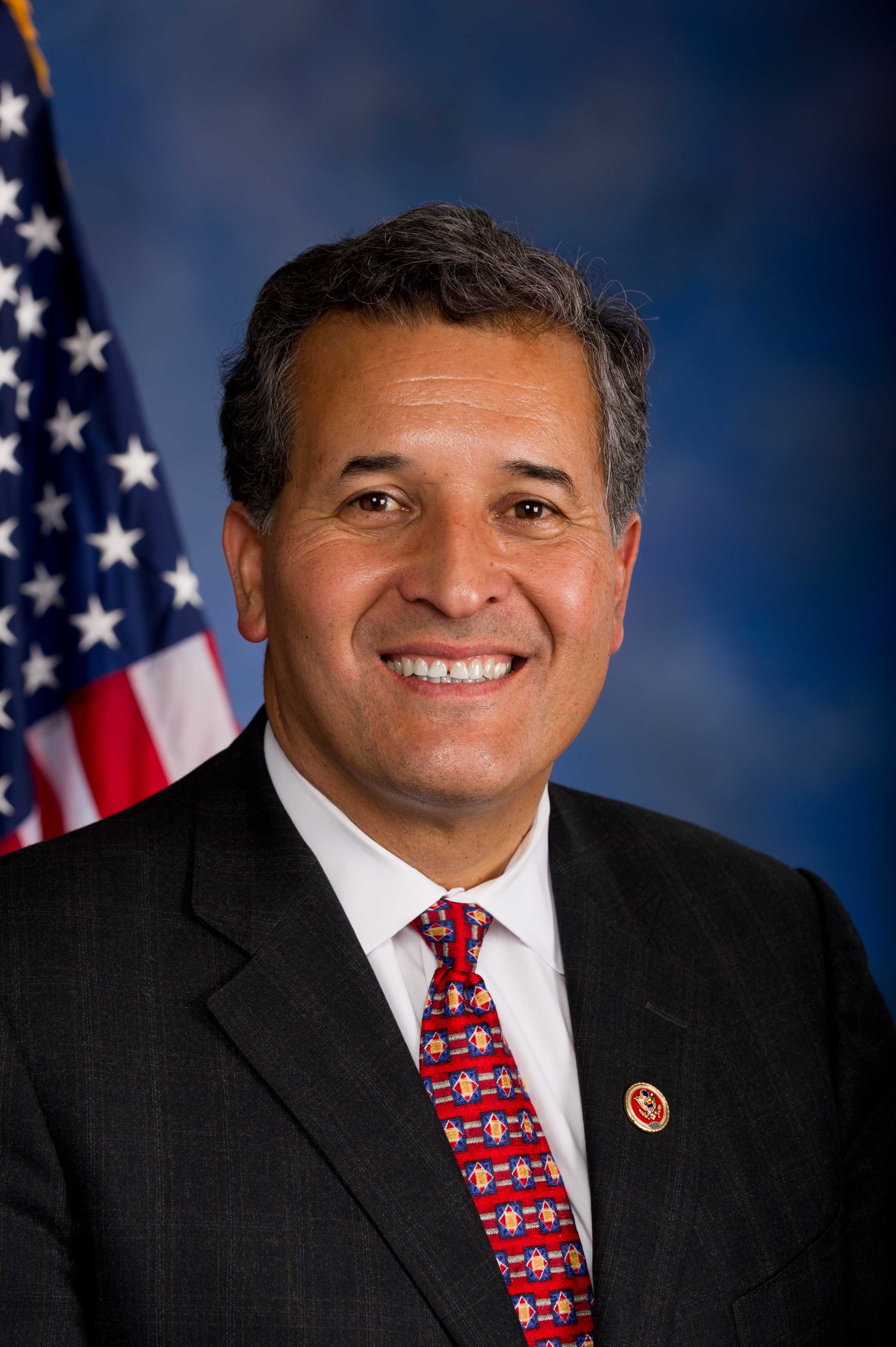
Juan Vargas

- John Baldessari, conceptual artist known for his work featuring found photography and appropriated images; born in National City.
- Joe Corona, soccer player for Club Tijuana and the United States, Joe attended Sweetwater High School.
- Andrew Cunanan, born in National City, a spree killer who claimed the lives of five people, most notably Italian fashion designer Gianni Versace between April and July 1997.
- Gail Devers, three-time Olympic gold medalist
- Donnie Edwards, San Diego Chargers 2002–2006 National Football League player
- Benji Gil, former Major League Baseball player, first-round pick
- Rosie Hamlin, singer, 1960s song "Angel Baby"
- Joe Orrell, former Major League Baseball pitcher, born in National City
- Anna M. Longshore Potts, established the Paradise Hotel and Sanitarium in National City in 1889
- Skid Roper, musician
- Dan Saleaumua, former player in the National Football League; born in National City.
- Juan Vargas, Representative of California's 51st congressional district, born in National City
- Tom Waits, singer/songwriter and musician
- Lukas Walton, billionaire heir, grandson of Sam Walton, the founder of Walmart

== In popular culture ==
- The film Return of the Killer Tomatoes (1988) was filmed in National City.
- Scenes from the film South of 8 (2016) were shot in National City.

== Sister cities ==
National City has two sister cities as designated by Sister Cities International:

- Tecate, Mexico
- Olongapo, Philippines
