= Michael Talbott =

American actor (born 1955)

- Born: February 2, 1955 (age 71); Waverly, Iowa, U.S.
- Occupations: Actor, spokesman
- Years active: 1973–2014

Michael Talbott (born February 2, 1955) is an American actor. He portrayed Detective Stanley Switek in the crime drama television series Miami Vice (1984–1989).

== Early life ==
Michael was born on February 2, 1955, in Waverly, Iowa, to parents Kay and John Talbott.

== Career ==
Talbott is best known for his co-starring role as Detective Stanley Switek in the 1980s television series Miami Vice. His other television credits include M*A*S*H, Sanford and Son, The Jeffersons, Eight is Enough and other series.

He appeared in a number of films, playing a bully in Carrie, a party-crasher in Big Wednesday, a highway patrolman in Any Which Way You Can, a reckless stunt driver in Used Cars, a real estate agent in Manhunter, and a reluctant deputy in First Blood. Talbott had a small part in National Lampoon's Vacation but his scene was edited out of the final cut, although his character "Cowboy" is shown in a photograph during the end credits, and his name appears in the credits as well.

== Personal life ==
Talbott is a supporter and member of National Rifle Association of America. He currently lives in his hometown of Waverly, Iowa.

As of 2011 he is also a spokesperson/presenter for Panteao Productions, a production company and distributor of firearms and tactical videos.

== Filmography ==
=== Film ===
Year	Title	Role	Notes
1974	Big Bad Mama	Sheriff's Son	
1976	Carrie	Freddy	
1977	The Reunion		Also director
1978	Big Wednesday	Hog	
1980	Used Cars	Mickey	
1980	Foolin' Around	Clay	
1980	Any Which Way You Can	Officer Morgan	
1981	Mommie Dearest	Driver	
1982	First Blood	Deputy Balford	
1983	Heart Like a Wheel	Englishtown Announcer	
1983	National Lampoon's Vacation	Cowboy	
1984	Racing with the Moon	Bill	
1986	Manhunter	Geehan	
1988	Miles from Home	Pickup Owner	
1988	Going to the Chapel	Marty	
1990	Little Vegas	Linus	
1991	Guilty as Charged	Sparrow	
1992	Sunset Heat	Bartender	
1992	Hero	State Police Officer	
1993	Acting on Impulse	Melvin	
1995	Captain Nuke and the Bomber Boys	Scumbag	
2014	Sal and the Goon	Isaac Guthry	Short film

=== Television ===
Year	Title	Role	Notes
1973	Blood Sport	Bubba Montgomery	Television film
1974	Unwed Father	Corey	Television film
1974	If I Love You, Am I Trapped Forever?	Dave McGee	Television film
1974	The Streets of San Francisco	Charles Reynolds	Episode: "Ten Dollar Murder"
1975	Sanford and Son	Pete	Episode: "The Family Man"
1976	Police Woman	Officer #1	Episode: "Trial by Prejudice"
1976	Baa Baa Black Sheep	S.P.	Episode: "The Cat's Whiskers"
1977	Dead of Night	Vinnie McCauley	Television film
1977	Kingston: Confidential	Billy Coughlin	Episode: "The Rage at Hannibal"
1977	M*A*S*H	G.I. #2	Episode: "Fallen Idol"
1978	James at 15	Casey Mahoney	Episode: "Star-Crossed Lovers"
1978	The Initiation of Sarah	Freddie	Television film
1978	A Death in Canaan	Trooper Miles	Television film
1979	Out of the Blue	Corman	Episode: "The Random Bust"
1980	Amber Waves	Tork Torkelson	Television film
1980	To Race the Wind	Burly Man	Television film
1980	Lou Grant	Warren	Episode: "Harassment"
1980	Used Cars	Mickey	
1981	Eight Is Enough	Ozzie	Episode: "Father Knows Best?"
1982	This Is Kate Bennett...	Gary Harris	Television film
1983	Uncommon Valor	Fireman	Television film
1983	Memorial Day	Watney	Television film
1983	Scarecrow and Mrs. King	Phil Brunsky	Episode: "Sudden Death"
1984	The Seduction of Gina	Gregg	Television film
1984	The Jeffersons	Cowboy	Episode: "My Guy, George"
1984	Bay City Blues	Charlie	Episode: "Rocky IV-Eyes"
1984–1989	Miami Vice	Detective Stan Switek	110 episodes
1985	Space	Tom Savage	Television miniseries
1990	Booker	Coach	Episode: "Reunion"
1990	Sugar and Spice	Joe	Episode: "Breaking in Is Hard to Do"
1991	Runaway Father	Bill	Television film
1993	Jack Reed: Badge of Honor	Eddie Dirkson	Television film
1994	Jack Reed: A Search for Justice	Eddie Dirkson	Television film
1995	Out There	Haywood Roussell	Television film
1995	Jack Reed: One of Our Own	Eddie Dirkson	Television film
1996	Jack Reed: Death and Vengeance	Eddie Dirkson	Television film
2001	The Fighting Fitzgeralds	Callahan	2 episodes
2001	Three Blind Mice	Jimmy Farrell	Television film

=== Video games ===
Year	Title	Role	Notes
1995	Mr. Payback: An Interactive Movie	Car Jerk	
