= Bristol Legible City =

Bristol Legible City is a wayfinding and information initiative developed by Bristol City Council in collaboration with the design practice City ID to improve how people navigate the city. The project combines on-street signage, printed maps, and digital systems to create a consistent identity for Bristol, helping residents and visitors better understand the city's layout.

Bristol Legible City has been described as a pioneering model of urban wayfinding. It has influenced the development of similar systems in other cities across the United Kingdom, such as Legible London and internationally. Within Bristol, it continues to play a crucial role in connecting different parts of the city, enhancing the visitor experience, and reinforcing the city's public identity; 97% of visitors found the maps helpful.

The concept was initiated in 1996 during a period of regeneration when Bristol sought to strengthen its reputation as a leading cultural and commercial centre. The city was widely considered difficult to navigate, with fragmented signage and inconsistent mapping. Bristol City Council launched the Legible City programme to address these issues, commissioning the Bristol-based design practice City ID, founded by Mike Rawlinson, to develop a unified design and mapping system.

== Features ==
The system includes pedestrian-focused street signage, on-street maps, directional panels, and printed walking guides. A consistent design language was created to link different neighbourhoods and highlight key destinations, such as cultural attractions, transport hubs, and public spaces. Over time, the scheme has expanded to integrate information for walking, cycling, and public transport, while also refining its mapping to show nearby facilities and activity areas.

Since its launch, the programme has undergone several updates. “Bristol Legible City 2.0” introduced illuminated maps to improve visibility at night and enhanced the level of detail to include activity hotspots, as well as cycling and transport networks. More recently, versions of the street furniture have incorporated smart technology, enabling real-time communication and data sharing in public spaces.
