= National Elementary School District =

School district in California, United States

Coordinates: 32.673559°N 117.090427°W

Location
- 1500 N Ave. National City, California 91950 United States

Other information
- Website: www.nsd.us

National School District is a public elementary school district based in National City, in the South Bay region of San Diego County, California.

In addition to almost all of National City, the district includes a small section of San Diego and a small piece of Chula Vista.
