= Legible London =

Wayfinding system in London, England

The Legible London logo

Legible London is a citywide wayfinding system for London, operated by Transport for London (TfL). The system is designed to provide a consistent visual language and wayfinding system across the city, allowing visitors and local residents to easily gain local geographic knowledge regardless of the area they are in. It is the world's largest municipal wayfinding system.

In addition to the on-street signs, Legible London maps appear in all London Underground (Tube) stations, Docklands Light Railway stations, and on bus shelters, as well as on Santander Cycles docking stations and the Cycle Superhighways commuter cycle routes.

== Design ==
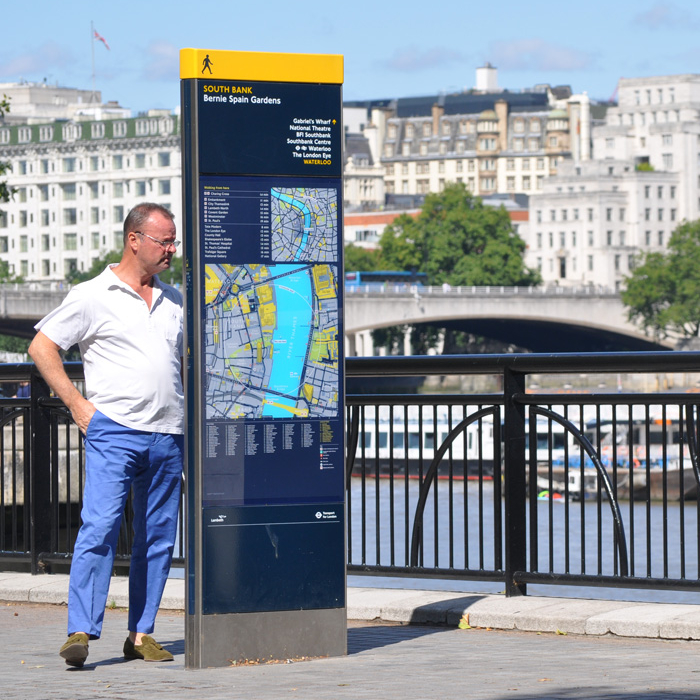
A man consulting a Legible London sign

The Legible London system comprises three sizes of sign, the "Monolith", "Midilith", and "Minilith", made of a mixture of vitreous enamel and vinyl printed glass materials within a stainless steel frame. The signs have a bright yellow stripe on top of the panels with the walking person icon, intended to make them easier to spot within the urban environment and when viewed from a distance.

Two maps, a "planner map" and a "finder map", are displayed on the majority of signs, one per side. In some cases the signs are one-sided due to the constraints of their placement. Both planner and finder maps show "walking circles" to place the user in the context of their surroundings. The planner map displays a circle indicating the range of 15 minutes' walking, indicated as 1.125 kilometres (0.699 mi), while the finder map shows one for 5 minutes' walking, indicated as 375 metres (0.233 mi). The distances are based on an average walking pace of 4.5 kilometres per hour (2.8 mph).

The maps are illustrated in 2D with significant landmarks shown in 3D, helping users to identify the urban environment. For the same reason the maps are oriented in the direction that the reader is facing, rather than with north at the top.

== History ==
In 2004, the then Mayor of London, Ken Livingstone declared that he would make London a walkable city by 2015. Subsequently, a project manager from the London Borough of Camden, as part of the Clear Zone Partnership, was sent to a walking conference in Bristol to study the Bristol Legible City signage system. He then championed a London version of the Bristol Legible City signs to the Central London Partnership, led by the then Chief Executive Officer, Patricia Brown. The London Borough of Camden with Westminster City Council and the City of London were also part of the Clear Zone Partnership which commissioned the consultants Space Syntax to produce a walking strategy to identify walking routes and new signage points in Central London. The project manager then identified the best practice design principles for these new signs from Bristol Legible City and similar signage systems in the London Borough of Islington and the City of London. This was the start of the London Borough Camden's work by the project manager to improve street furniture in London which continued with the Camden bench.

The Central London Partnership organisation, representing central London government and businesses, commissioned the design consultancies AIG London and Lacock Gullam to research London's walking environments. The research resulted in a study, published in January 2006, that proposed the idea of a "Legible London".

The authors of the report found that there were 32 different wayfinding systems in central London alone, implemented by various local institutions such as boroughs and councils. The inconsistency between the systems was a source visual incoherency and confusion throughout the city for pedestrians, leading to a sense of insecurity that undermined the city's potential for retail and tourism.

The report also noted that although many Tube stations were quicker to walk than use a train to travel between, many visitors were unaware of this, and subsequently causing avoidable congestion on the Tube. Similarly, not knowing the local geography caused many pedestrians and travellers to use the tube map when navigating, with over 40% of the city's travellers using the Tube map even when navigating on foot.

Local area studies were undertaken in Westminster, South Bank, Richmond and Twickenham to show how the concept could adapt to different urban forms, with a further study in Hackney looking at specific issues relating to transport interchange. An exhibition at New London Architecture was held to promote the idea and lobby for its adoption.

The London Borough of Camden began a funding bid for Legible London signs, however Transport for London decided that Westminster would be a better test location. A prototype was commissioned by Westminster City Council, the Greater London Authority through TfL, New West End Company and the Crown Estate, comprising 19 signs installed around Oxford Street and Bond Street along with new customised maps and information panels.

Following a successful reception of the prototype and research results the project was formally adopted by TfL for further development and evaluation in collaboration with the design agencies. Three pilot schemes were commissioned in Westminster/Camden, South Bank, and Richmond and Twickenham to demonstrate how the system could be applied and work for different urban forms and travel demands, and further test the signs' design, mapping scales and information content. A fourth pilot was commissioned by Westminster City Council for the West End. A survey following the pilot schemes showed an extremely high degree of support among members of the public.

== Outside London ==
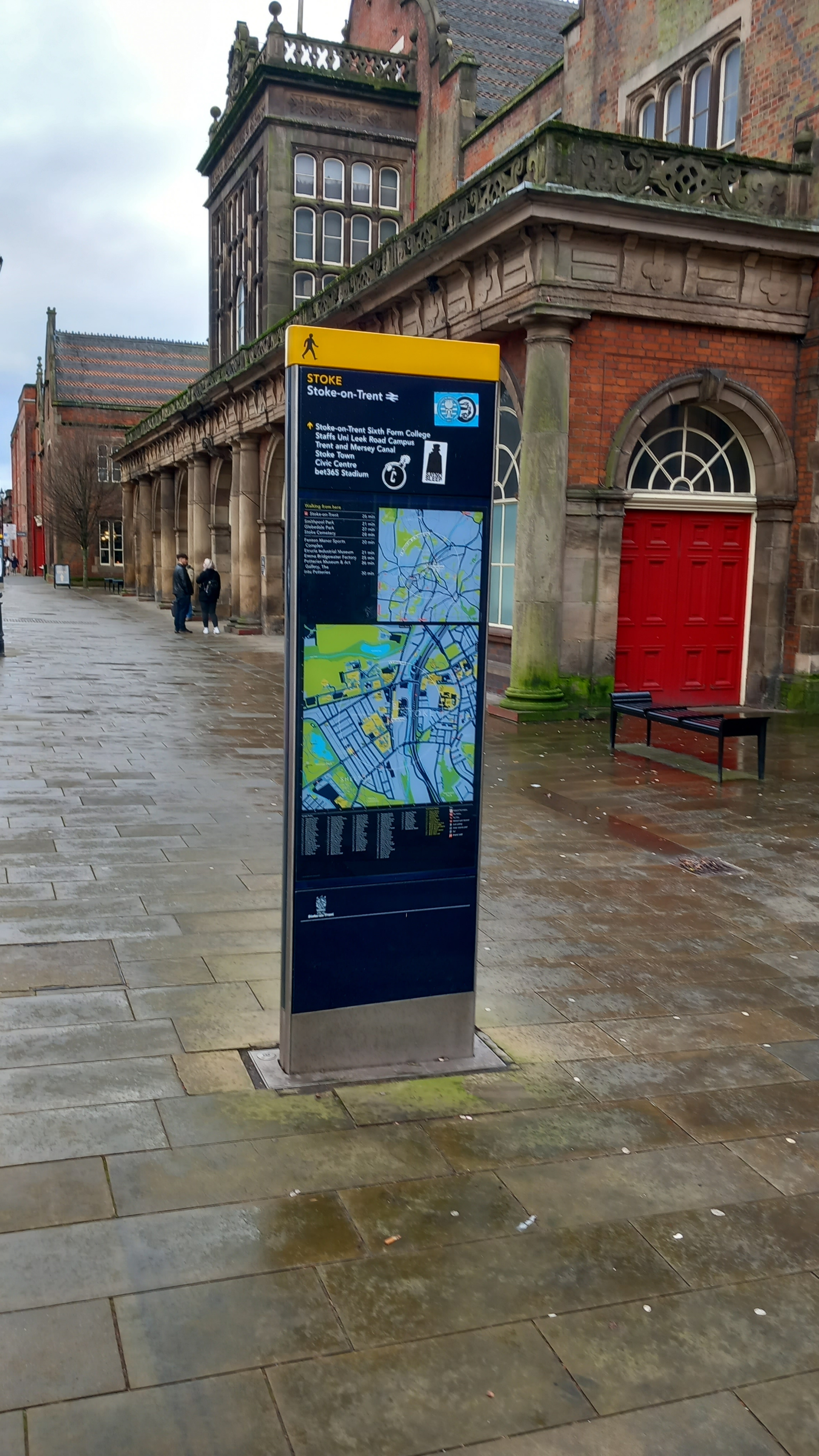
A wayfinding monolith map outside Stoke-on-Trent railway station, based on Transport for London's Legible London system

Legible London-style monoliths and fingerposts have also been introduced on streets and canals in Stoke-on-Trent.

== Awards ==
- Gold Medal, Design for Society section, Design Business Association Design Effectiveness Awards, 2008
- Ordnance Survey MasterMap Award for Better Mapping, British Cartographic Society, 2009
- Honor Award, Society for Experiential Graphic Design, 2010
