= Paradise Valley Hospital (California) =

- Prime Healthcare
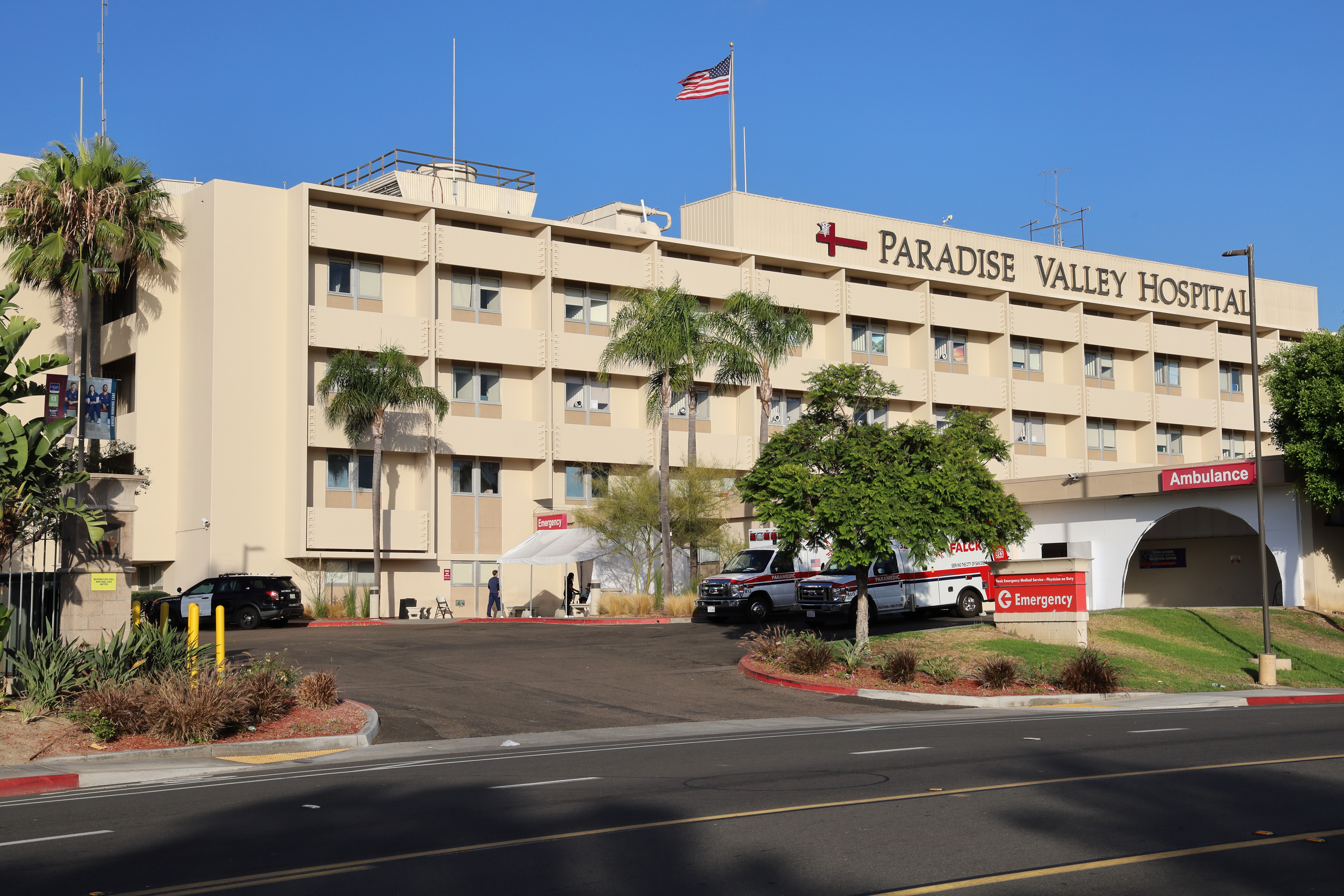
- West Wing in 2022

Geography
- Location: 2400 East Fourth Street, National City, California, United States
- Coordinates: 32.68531°N 117.08251°W

Organization
- Care system: Private
- Type: Community
- Affiliated university: None

Services
- Beds: 290

History
- Founded: 1904

Links
- Website: https://www.paradisevalleyhospital.net/
- Lists: Hospitals in California

Paradise Valley Hospital is a 290-bed acute care facility in National City, California. It began operation in 1904 as a sanitarium and is currently under the ownership and operation of Prime Healthcare Services, a hospital management company located in Ontario, California. Paradise Valley Hospital is the largest private employer in National City, with a workforce of approximately 1,200 employees.

== History ==
In 1883, Dr. Anna L. Potts started construction of Mount Paradise Sanitarium seven miles from San Diego. The thirty room sanitarium was finished in 1887. But in 1895, lacking water and patients, Dr. Potts closed Potts Sanitarium, mortgaging it for $14,000. In 1900, Ellen G. White a founder of the Seventh-day Adventist Church repeatedly received strong impressions from God that the region was a good location for a sanitarium and hospital. During Mrs. White's visit to San Diego in 1902, Paradise Sanitarium was for sale for $11,000. Real estate prices slowly declined as the drought continued. In 1904, the price was down to $6,000, but the local conference didn't want to buy it. Later Mrs. White and a wealthy friend, Mrs. Josephine Gotzain, bought it for $4,000. There still was no water, so Ellen White hired a well digger and water was found at 98 feet. Before Paradise Valley Sanitarium could open, Mrs. Julia Ulrich arrived becoming the first patient. Others followed putting off the dedication of the sanitarium until 1906. After 5 years Paradise Valley Sanitarium was sold to the Seventh-day Adventist Church in 1910. Mabel White, the sanitariums first nurse did all the cooking and cleaning. The sanitarium gave natural remedies, a healthy diet and clean living. A training school for nurses was started at Paradise Valley Sanitarium in 1909. In 1914 the school was approved by California and continued to operate until 1966. In 1966 a new Paradise Valley Hospital opened in National City.

In 2006, the money losing Paradise Valley Hospital needed a $61 million remodeling to make it earthquake compliant. Adventist Health sold Paradise Valley Hospital to Prime Healthcare Services, a new for-profit hospital chain owned by Dr. Prem Reddy, for $30 million.
