= Patricia Brown (urban strategist) =

British urban strategist and consultant

Patricia Brown MBE Hon FRIBA is a British urban strategist and consultant. She is the founder and director of Central, a consultancy that advises civic and business leaders on the dynamics of cities. She is noted for her role in major public realm and urban design initiatives in London, including the pedestrianisation of Trafalgar Square, the introduction of Business Improvement Districts (BIDs) to the UK and the Legible London wayfinding system.

Brown was appointed Member of the Order of the British Empire (MBE) for services to London. She is also an Honorary Fellow of the Royal Institute of British Architects (Hon FRIBA) and an honorary doctorate in 2024 from the University of the Built Environment

== Career ==
Brown began her career working in communications and city promotion before moving into urban strategy. She became Chief Executive of the Central London Partnership (CLP), a cross-sectoral initiative linking public and private organisations in support of London's economic competitiveness and liveability. In that role, she was closely involved in some of the most high-profile public realm changes in the capital, including lobbying for the pedestrianisation of Trafalgar Square, introducing Business Improvement Districts (BIDs) to the United Kingdom, and developing the Legible London pedestrian wayfinding system in partnership with Transport for London.

In 2009, Brown established Central, a consultancy that advises civic leaders, landowners, and developers on urban change. Her work has also encompassed research and studies such as Public Life, Public Space, with Jan Gehl and Quality Streets, which examined the relationship between design, urban quality, and business performance.

== Advisory and non-executive roles ==
Brown has served on several advisory and governance boards, including:

- Vice-chair, British Property Federation’s Development Committee.
- Non-executive Chair, South Kensington Estates Ltd.
- Member, Historic England's London Advisory Committee and National Advisory Committee.
- Member, Great Western Railway Strategic Advisory Board.

She has also been involved with the London Festival of Architecture, including as its chair, and served as Deputy Chair of the Mayor of London's Design Advisory Group.
