= Mile of Cars =

Auto row in National City, California, United States

Route information
- Length: 1 mi (1.6 km)
- Existed: 1955 (name)–present

Location
- Country: United States

Highway system

The Mile of Cars is an automotive association in National City, California, southeast of San Diego. The mile-long stretch of National City Boulevard comprises 21 new car dealerships.

== History ==
It was first established in 1904 when the city's first car dealership opened and took its name in 1955. By 1970, more than one million dollars in vehicles were sold. During the 1960s–1980s redevelopment era in National City, the Mile of Cars became a major source of sales tax revenue for the city and a focal point of local economic planning. By the 1970s and 1980s, the corridor had grown to include dozens of franchised dealerships; contemporary news coverage noted the district's importance to municipal finances and its role in shaping the city's commercial identity.

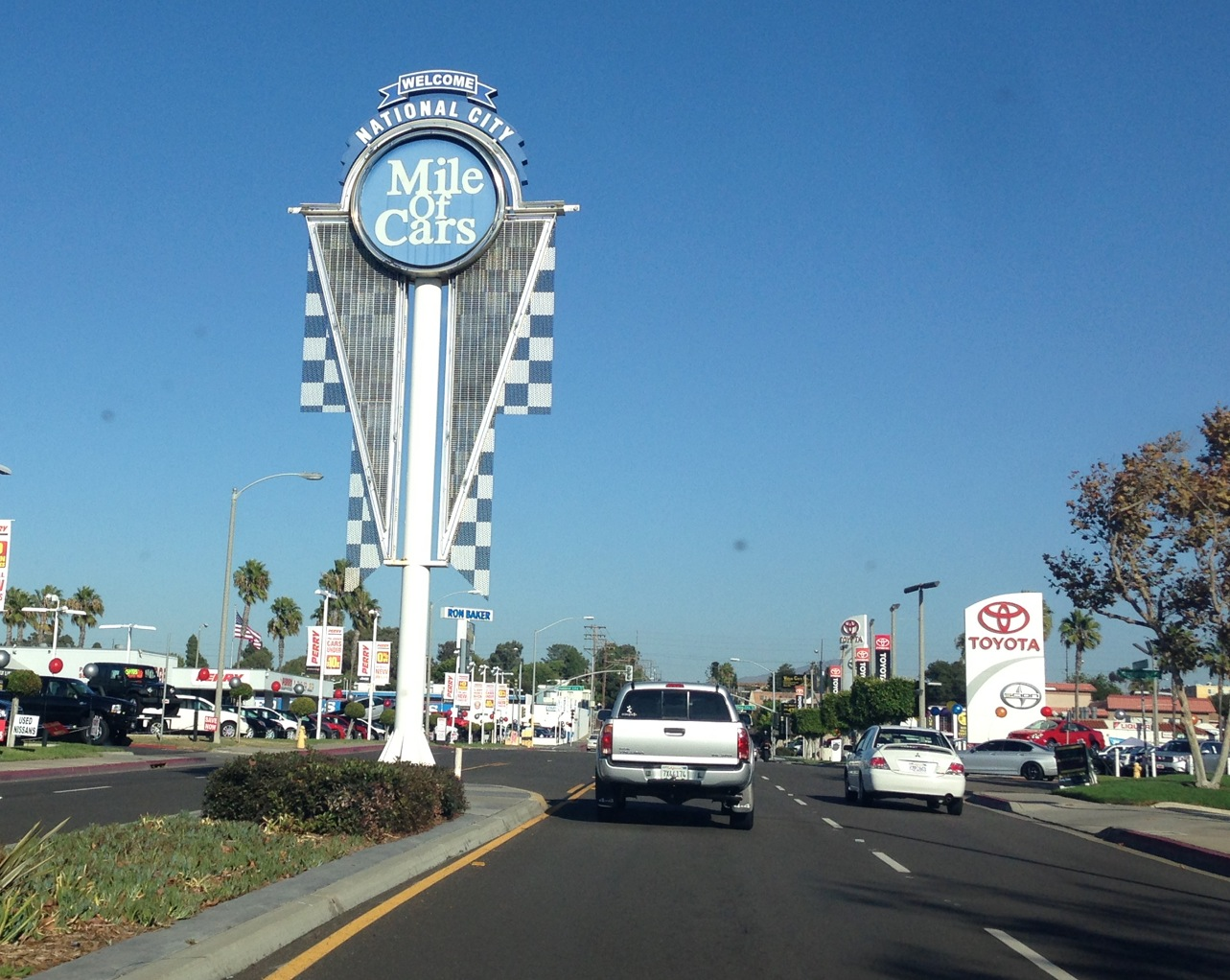
Entrance to the Mile of Cars
