= Tourism improvement district =

Type of business improvement district in the United States

A tourism improvement district (TID) is a type of business improvement district in the United States. The aim of a TID is to increase the number of overnight visitors using businesses and services in the area. TIDs are formed through a public–private partnership between the local government and the businesses in a district. TID funds are usually managed by a nonprofit corporation, generally a Convention and Visitors' Bureau, hotel association, or similar destination marketing organization. Typical TID services include marketing programs to raise awareness of the destination, sponsorship of special events that attract overnight visitors, and sales programs to bring in large-group business. Synonymous terms for TIDs include: tourism marketing district, hotel improvement district, and tourism business improvement district.

== Tourism Improvement Districts by US States ==
=== California ===
In California, tourism improvement districts are formed under the Property and Business Improvement District Law of 1994, the Parking and Business Improvement Area Law of 1989, or a similar enabling ordinance adopted by a charter city. California districts are also subject to other laws designed to ensure approval by business owners paying the assessment and accountability by the managing body to those business owners.

Tourism improvement districts are formed with a majority of assessed businesses consenting and the local government's approval. Funds raised are returned to a non-profit corporation which is under contract with the local government to manage those funds. Several accountability mechanisms ensure that funds are spent in accordance with a specifically defined district plan that includes marketing and sales programs approved by the businesses paying into the district. The two main reasons for TIDs' growing popularity among tourism-related businesses are:

- Funds cannot be spent on programs that do not benefit the businesses paying the assessment
- Funds cannot be diverted by the government for other programs

As of November 2010, there were over 91 known local tourism improvement districts in California, including:

- San Diego Tourism Marketing District
- San Francisco Tourism Improvement District
- Napa Valley Tourism Improvement District
- Sacramento County Tourism Improvement District
- Marin County Tourism Improvement District
- South Lake Tahoe Tourism Business Improvement District
- San Jose Hotel Business Improvement Area
- Santa Barbara South Coast Tourism Business Improvement District
- Long Beach Tourism Business Improvement Area
- Del Mar Tourism Business Improvement District
- Newport Beach Tourism Improvement District
- Monterey County Tourism Improvement District
- Mendocino County Lodging Business Improvement District
- Oceanside Tourism Marketing District

Most districts encompass either a city or county, although some include multiple cities or a county and the cities within it. California's first tourism improvement district was formed in West Hollywood in 1992. The most recent district to be formed as of 2010 was in Santa Barbara, in September 2010. California's tourism improvement districts range from small five-hotel community districts to major cities with several hundred hotels, and their budgets range from $100,000 to more than $30 million.

One of California's most noticeable tourism improvement districts is the San Diego Tourism Marketing District. The district funded the “Happy Happens” advertising campaign. The San Diego Tourism Marketing District funds many programs and events designed to bring overnight visitors to San Diego, including San Diego Comic-Con and the Holiday Bowl.

In 2012, San Diegans for Open Government filed a lawsuit challenging the renewal of the San Diego Tourism Marketing District. The suit, brought by public-interest lawyer Cory Briggs, argued that the assessment was in effect a tax and therefore invalid under California Proposition 26, which requires a two-thirds supermajority to pass a tax. In January 2016, a judge ruled that the nonprofit had legal standing to pursue the case.

=== Montana ===
In Montana, upon a petition by owners of 60% of the businesses in the district, a municipality may begin the district formation process by adopting a resolution of intention. There is a 15-day period in which owners may protest formation of the district, and the municipality must hold public hearings on the proposed district. A 5-7 member board of trustees is appointed to manage the district.

=== Nevada ===
In 2005, Nevada passed a tourism improvement district law. Under the law, the governing body of a municipality may create a tourism improvement district for the purposes of carrying out the law and without any election can acquire, improve, equip, operate and maintain a project within such district. Proceeds from certain state and local sales tax generated within the district can be used to finance the project.

=== Washington State ===
Washington's Tourism Promotion Areas Law requires submission of petitions from business owners who will pay 60% or more of the proposed assessment. Only lodging businesses with forty or more units can be included in the tourism promotion area. Upon receipt of petitions, the municipality must adopt a resolution of intention and hold public hearings on the proposed promotion area. An advisory board or commission may be appointed, or a destination marketing organization may be designated to manage the district funds.
