= Business improvement district =

Defined geographical area as relating to legal business matters

A business improvement district (BID) is a defined area in which businesses elect to pay an additional fee (or assessment) to fund projects within the district's boundaries. BID funds are collected and used for the exclusive benefit of the industry that pays the assessment, so these funds are not taxes paid to a government.

The BID is often funded primarily through the assessment but can also draw on other public and private funding streams. BIDs may go by other names, such as business improvement area (BIA), business revitalization zone (BRZ), business improvement zone (BIZ), community improvement district (CID), community benefit district (CBD), special services area (SSA), or special improvement district (SID). These districts typically fund services which are defined by the industry collecting the assessment, and may include work perceived by some businesses as being inadequately performed by government with its existing tax revenues, such as cleaning streets, providing security, making capital improvements, construction of pedestrian and streetscape enhancements, and marketing the area. The services provided by BIDs are supplemental to those already provided by the municipality. The revenue derives from an assessment voted on by commercial property owners, industry members (BIDs can be formed around industries, not just physical properties), and in some cases, residential property owners.

== Development ==
The first BID was the Bloor West Village Business Improvement Area, established in Toronto, Canada, in 1970 as an initiative by local private business. The first BID in the United States was the Downtown Development District in New Orleans established in 1974, and there were 1,200 across the country by 2011. Other countries with BIDs include Australia, New Zealand, South Africa, Jamaica, Serbia, Albania, Germany, Ireland, Singapore, the Netherlands, and the United Kingdom.

The process for creating a BID varies from one jurisdiction to another. In the United States, it generally involves three steps. First, typically 51% or more of the economic representatives of an industry petition the local government to create the BID. Second, the local government determines that the economic majority of an industry want the BID. Third, the local government enacts legislation creating the BID. Prior to this occurring, state legislatures need to grant local units the authority to create BIDs. The operating budgets of BIDs range from a few thousand dollars to tens of millions of dollars. A BID may be operated by a nonprofit organization or by a quasi-governmental entity. The governance of a BID is the responsibility of a board composed of some combination of property owners, businesses, and government officials. The management of a BID is the job of a paid administrator, usually occupying the position of an executive director of a management company.

BIDs in England and Wales are funded by a levy on the occupiers rather than the owners of the properties within the area. If voted in by local businesses, the BID levy is an extension to existing non-domestic business-rates. "In England and Wales, for a BID to go ahead the ballot must be won on two counts: straight majority and majority of rateable value. In Scotland for a ballot to be successful it must meet four criteria, a minimum turnout of 25% by the number of eligible persons (the headcount) and by rateable value and a majority of those that vote by number of ballots and by rateable value must vote in favour. This ensures that the interests of large and small businesses are protected."

== Distribution ==
=== Canada ===
It is estimated that there are more than 500 BIDs in Canada, including more than 270 in the province of Ontario. Toronto has 83 BIAs within its city limits. Montreal – where BIAs are called Sociétés de développement commercial – has more than 25. Winnipeg has 16 "Business Improvement Zones," the first of which were formed in 1987, with the amendment of The City of Winnipeg Act. In the province of Alberta, there are 15 BIAs in Calgary and 13 BIAs in Edmonton. In the province of Saskatchewan, there are two BIDs in Regina and five BIDs in Saskatoon. There are nine Business Improvement Districts in the Halifax Regional Municipality.

BIDs have also become a powerful lobby group, lobbying government for improvements such as new sidewalks, trees, park benches and other restorations. BIDs can also lobby different levels of government for significant changes to their area if they feel it is necessary to improve business.

=== Germany ===
Six of the sixteen German Bundeslander (Federal States) introduced the requisite legal framework to create BIDs: Hamburg, Bremen, Hessen, North Rhine-Westphalia, Saarland and Schleswig-Holstein. BID projects in implementation exist only in a few German cities so far – e.g. in Flensburg, Hamburg and Giessen.

=== South Africa ===
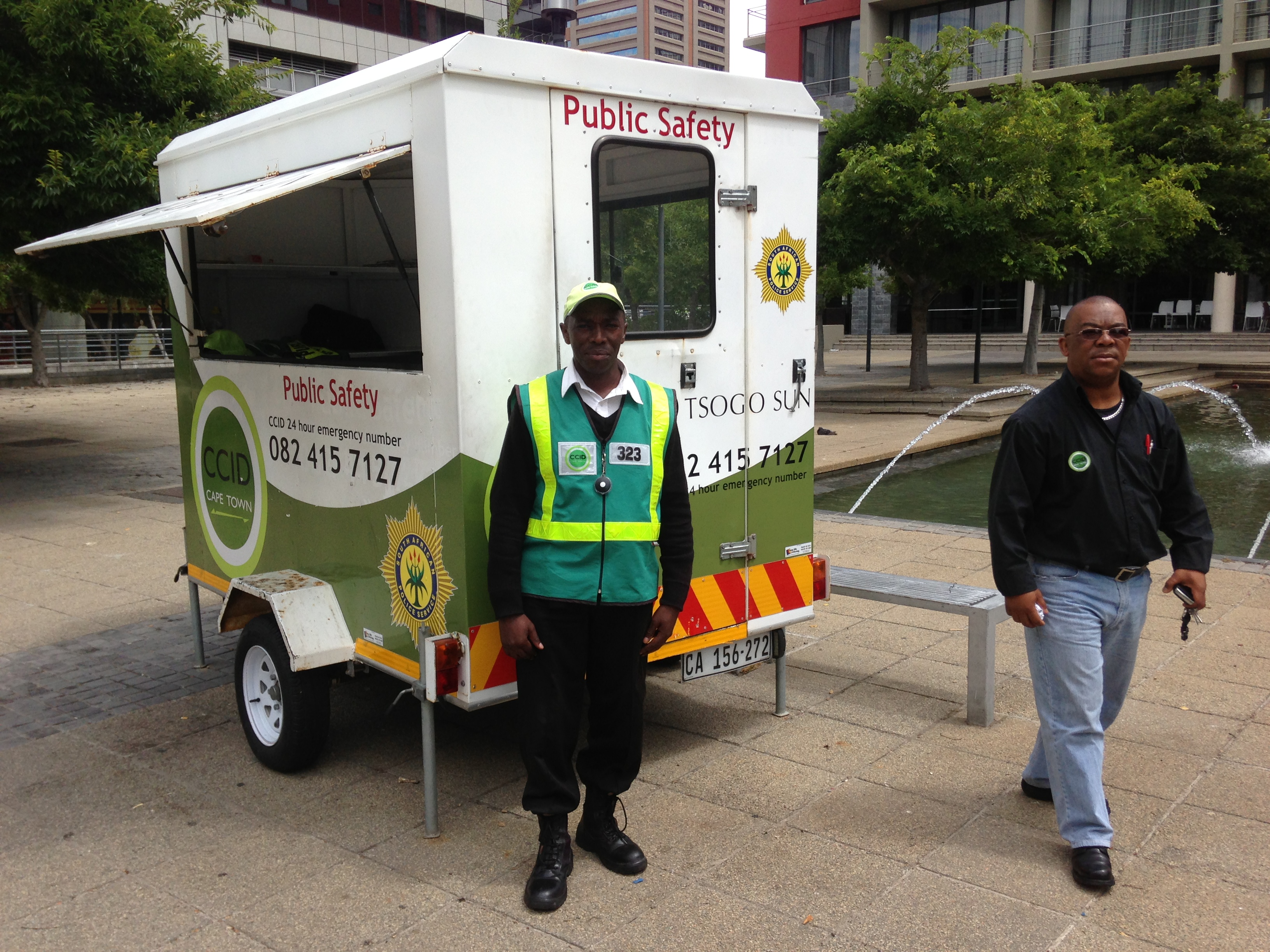
A Cape Town Central City Improvement District trailer, guard and manager in the city center. Providing an additional security service to the area.

A number of improvement districts were set up in South Africa from the mid-1990s onward, most prominently in the cities of Cape Town and Johannesburg. In South Africa the typical focus of a BID is on providing supplementary urban management (city cleanup, beautification and security services), communications, and social development (focus on homelessness) services in the BID area; in addition to similar services provided by government. A BID in South Africa can only be established if more than 50% of all property owners (representing over 50% of total property value) in an area accept the proposal to create one, after which all property owners within that designated area are obliged through municipal rates to contribute to the running of the BID.

South Africa's first BID was formed in Cape Town in 2000. with the model becoming popular The Cape Town CCID was the catalyst for over 50 other BIDs across the City of Cape Town. BIDs are typically set up with the assistance of the City of Cape Town and offers three possible models: Mixed-Use improvement districts (where both residential and business property owners pay), business improvement districts (where only owners of business properties pay), and residential improvement districts (were only owners of residential properties pay). The successes of BIDs have been credited for significantly contributing to the relative recent growth of the city.

The first BID in Johannesburg was established in 1993 and is now an established model across multiple ares of the city.

=== United Kingdom ===
In England and Wales, BIDs were introduced by Patricia Brown in July 2000 during her tenure as chief executive officer at Central London Partnership. They were later formalised through the Local Government Act 2003, and subsequent regulations in 2004. The Circle Initiative, a five-year scheme funded by the London Development Agency, set up the first pilot BIDs, five in London, all of which had successful ballots by March 2006. The first UK BID 'Kingston First' was established in Kingston upon Thames in January 2005. In October 2007 there were 36 proposed or operational BIDs across Greater London, and by late 2014 there were over 180 in operation in the United Kingdom. This number increased to 303 throughout the UK by December 2018.

==== London ====
The New West End Company is the management and promotional company for London's Bond Street, Oxford Street and Regent Street. As one of the largest BIDs in Europe, New West End Company brings together the commercial interests of over 600 retailers, property owners and West End businesses working closely with the Mayor of London, Transport for London, Westminster City Council, the Metropolitan Police and local neighbours.

Better Bankside was the third BID to be established in the UK, the second in London and the first south of the river. It was founded in 2005, and underwent a successful re-ballot in 2010 with 82% of businesses in favour. It won awards including Best Visitor Information Initiatives Silver Award in 2008, the Best Community Project 2011 and Best Partnership Award 2012 in the Mayor of London's BID Awards, and was short-listed for Best Marketing & Communications Campaign, Transport for London Smarter Travel Awards 2010. The Better Bankside BID was set up and is managed by The Means, a regeneration consultancy company.

==== Scotland ====
Business Improvement Districts Scotland is the national organisation and voice for BIDs in Scotland, responsible for delivering the Scottish Government's BIDs programme, providing central support to developing BIDs, promoting and encouraging the development of BIDs across the country, whilst also working with operational BIDs to assist them in delivering for their local communities and contributing to sustainable inclusive economic growth.

The Scottish Government provides a grant to local groups of up to £20,000 to help with the development of the BID. The legislation in Scotland (The Planning etc. (Scotland) Act 2006) is different from the England and Wales legislation in that it allows property owners as well as occupiers to be included in a BID. There are also differences in the timescales, ballot and reballot criteria, and the legislative requirements of the BID proposer. In Scotland, for a ballot to be successful it must meet four criteria: a minimum turnout of 25% (by the number of eligible persons and by rateable value); and a majority of those that vote (by number of ballots and by rateable value).

The intention of the Scottish legislation is that BIDs are not restricted to towns and city centres, to allow innovative BIDs to be developed across the country. The consultation of 2003 proposed that the BID model could be used in business parks, tourism and visitor areas, rural areas, agriculture and single-business sectors. The legislation and subsequent regulations were passed by the Scottish Parliament in 2006 and 2007 respectively.

In March 2006, the Scottish Government announced funding for six pilot BIDs in Scotland: Bathgate (town centre), Clackmannanshire (business parks), Edinburgh (city centre), Falkirk (town centre), Glasgow (city centre) and Inverness (city centre). There are currently thirty seven operational BIDs in Scotland with a further twenty four in development. The operational BIDs include thirty one town and city centre BIDs and three business park BIDs.

In March 2014 the first tourism BID was delivered in Loch Ness and Inverness. The first themed BID in Scotland was delivered in December 2013, the Sauchiehall Street Evening Economy BID. In 2016 the world's first food and drink BID was delivered in East Lothian with the levy based on the number of full-time employees, also a first.

The development and interest in the BIDs model in Scotland continues to grow and the flexibility of the legislation and the model is now being recognised with the development of the Borders Railway BIDs Corridor, and four canal BIDs led by Scottish Waterways Trust. In 2017 BIDs Scotland published The National Report on BIDs in Scotland which covers the types of BIDs, number of businesses, levels of employment in BIDs in Scotland and the contribution they make to sustainable and inclusive economic growth.

=== United States ===
By 1996 there were over 1,000 BIDs in the United States. New York City has 76 BIDs, the most of any city; in NYC, BIDs invest $159 million annually in neighborhoods throughout the five boroughs. BIDs exist in almost every one of the top 50 largest cities in the United States, including Los Angeles, Chicago, Houston, Philadelphia, Atlanta, San Francisco, Seattle, and Washington, DC. Minneapolis and Boston have been the last of the top 20 largest regions to adopt a business improvement district. BIDs also exist in smaller communities within the United States. For instance, nearly 90 BIDs exist in Wisconsin, almost half of which are located within communities of fewer than 20,000 residents.

== Criticism ==
Whilst BIDs have been heralded for improving the trading environment, BIDs have also received noteworthy criticism.

BIDs have been accused of being unaccountable and by their very nature undemocratic, concentrating power in a geographic area into the hands of the few. Small businesses who fall below the BID levy threshold, although not liable to pay the BID levy, are often priced out of an area because BIDs tend to increase rental values. Larger businesses are more able to absorb these rent increases, particularly the multiple stores.

BIDs have also been criticized in the past by anti-poverty groups for being too harsh on the homeless and poor who may congregate around businesses. BIDs have also been known to be opposed to street vendors such as hot dog vendors and chip wagons. In London, street traders who sold small items to tourists were barred from Oxford Street in London.

President of Civic Voice, Griff Rhys Jones criticised the creation of a BID in central London neighbourhood saying that is undemocratic: "Neither the people who live there, nor the many intriguing small shops and businesses, have been allowed to vote or have even been consulted.". "I am wary of this initiative because of what may become unintended consequences (or indeed intended consequences) that help one sort of business (the property letting business) but will cause problems to smaller businesses and the large and wholly integrated residential population of the district". He also criticised some of the methods to oppose the BID.

== See also ==
- Special-purpose district
- Redevelopment
- Infill
