= Edge of Darkness (disambiguation) =

Edge of Darkness is a 1985 British television crime-drama serial.

Edge of Darkness may also refer to:

- Edge of Darkness (1943 film), a war film directed by Lewis Milestone
- Edge of Darkness (2010 film), a film adaptation of the 1985 TV series
  - Edge of Darkness (2010 soundtrack), the soundtrack to the adaptation
- Edge of Darkness (1985 soundtrack), a soundtrack album from the series, by Eric Clapton and Michael Kamen
- Rudra: The Edge of Darkness, a 2022 Indian crime drama TV series
- "The Edge of Darkness", a song from the album The X Factor by Iron Maiden
