= Post-Attack Command and Control System Facility, Hadley =

Decommissioned nuclear bunker in Massachusetts, US

- Part of Strategic Air Command
- Hadley, Massachusetts
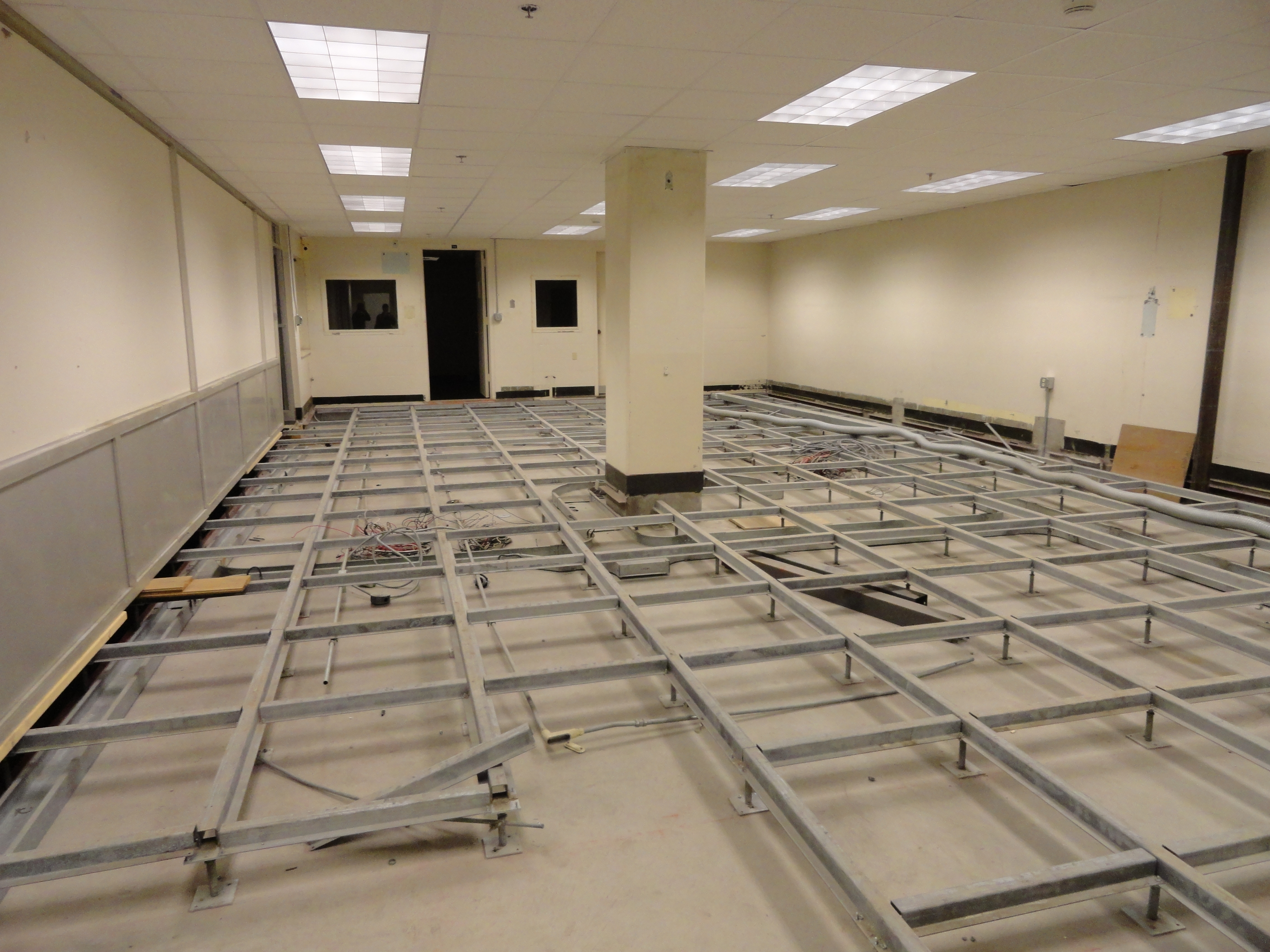
- Raised floor framework in old command room computer area

Site information
- Type: Hardened underground facility

Location
- Coordinates: 42°18′15.13″N 72°32′6.37″W

Site history
- Built: 1957–1958
- Built by: U.S. Air Force
- In use: 1958–1970
- Events: Cuban Missile Crisis

Garrison information
- Garrison: Hadley, Massachusetts
- Occupants: Eighth Air Force

Post-Attack Command and Control System Facility, Hadley is a defunct Post-Attack Command and Control System facility that operated from June 2, 1958, until 1970. It is located on and under Bare Mountain in Hadley, Massachusetts. The facility was known by many different names: Eighth Air Force Combat Operations Center (COC), "The Notch", and "Westover Communications Annex" since it was related to nearby Westover Air Force Base, and nicknamed The Bunker.

The facility has been described as having two underground stories amounting to 40,000 square feet (3,700 m^{2}). It was designed to house 135 people.

== History ==
In 1957, Strategic Air Command began construction for a hardened bunker to contain the command post for the Eighth Air Force, which was located at nearby Westover Air Force Base, Chicopee, Massachusetts. The facility was located inside Bare Mountain, off Route 116, and was nicknamed "The Notch", after the adjacent pass. The underground facility, built into the side of Bare Mountain, was hardened to protect it from the effects of a nearby nuclear blast and designed so that the senior military staff could facilitate further military operations.

It was connected to ATT Blackstone, ATT Chesterfield, and ATT Peru via microwave transmissions during its operation.

== Reuse ==
The facility was shut down in 1970, when the Eighth Air Force was relocated to Guam. After the United States Air Force abandoned the site in 1970, the Federal Reserve took over and used it as a secure storage facility for their records. Allegedly they stored large sums of money there as well, to be used to restart the economy after a nuclear war.

Today, the bunker is used as a library storage facility for the Five Colleges.

The facility was used in the 2010 Mel Gibson movie Edge of Darkness. The front entrance of the facility stood in for the main entrance of the Northmoor Facility in the movie and the access road, Military Road, was used in the beginning of the pursuit scene where Gibson's character begins his chase of the facility director.

== Units based there ==
- Eighth Air Force (1958–1970)
- 814th Combat Defense Squadron (1958–1968)
- 99th Security Police Squadron (1968–1970)

== See also ==
- Continuity of government
- Magic Mountain
- Post-Attack Command and Control System
- List of military installations in Massachusetts
