= Golda Rosheuvel =

British actress

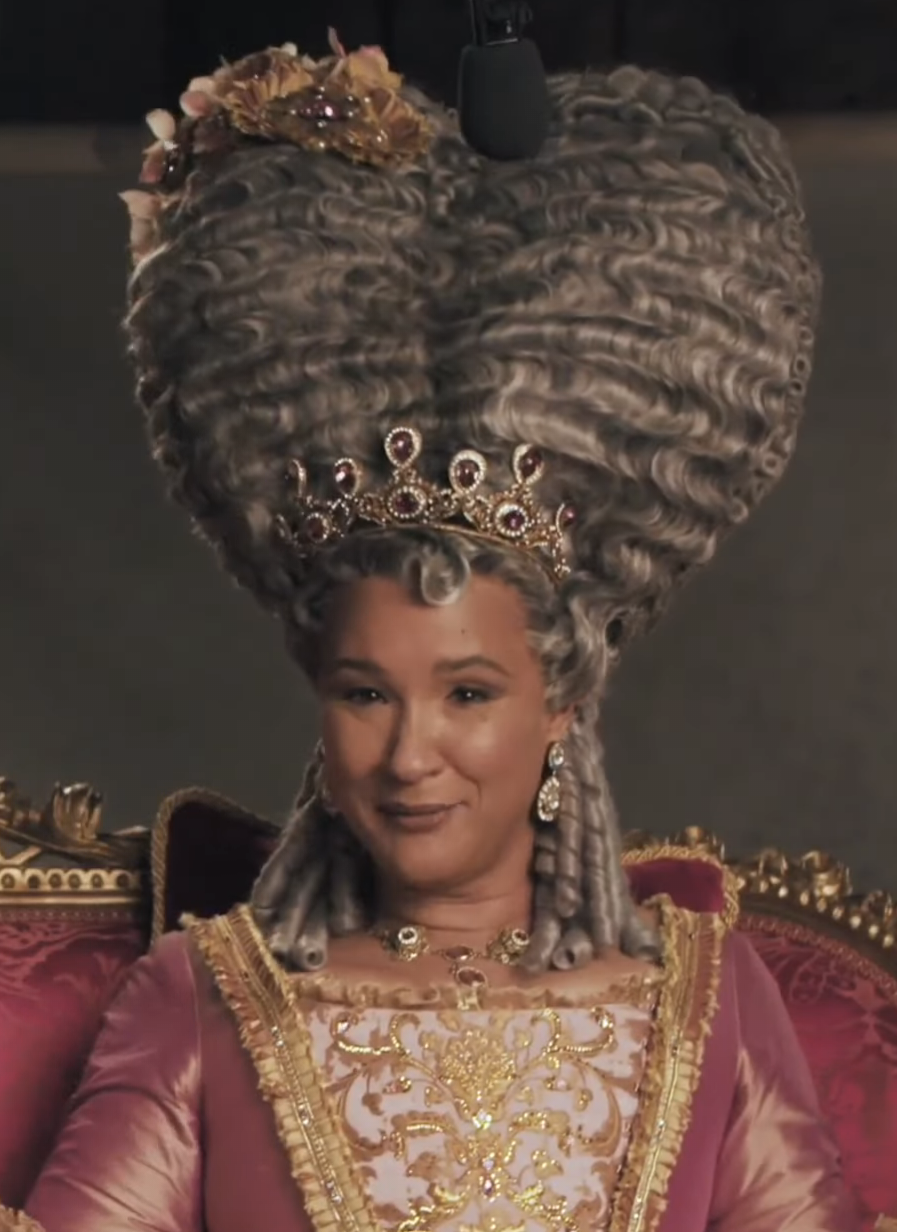
- Rosheuvel in 2024
- Born: 2 May 1970 (age 56); Guyana
- Education: London Studio Centre
- Occupation: Actress
- Years active: 2000–present
- Spouse: Shireen Mula

Golda Rosheuvel (born 2 May 1970) is a British actress and singer. She is known for her theatre work and a number of on-screen roles, most prominently for her portrayal of Queen Charlotte in the Netflix period drama series Bridgerton (2020–present) and its prequel Queen Charlotte: A Bridgerton Story (2023).

== Early life ==
Rosheuvel was born in Guyana to a Guyanese Anglican priest, Patrick Rosheuvel, and an English mother, Judith Evans. She moved frequently around Guyana due to her father's mission work, often staying with indigenous tribes. When she was five, her family moved in with her mother's brother in England before eventually settling in Hertfordshire. She has a brother.

Rosheuvel spent her teen years doing athletics with intent to be a professional athlete. She did the 100-metre sprint, javelin, and the long-jump. However, when she suffered an ankle injury, she turned her focus to theatre.

She studied for a diploma in performance at East Herts College, before going on to study musical theatre at the London Studio Centre.

== Career ==
Rosheuvel's first professional theatre credit was portraying Donna on a nine-month European tour of Hair, while she was still in college.

Rosheuvel's stage credits include Porgy and Bess, Macbeth, The Winter's Tale, Romeo and Juliet, Angels in America, Bad Girls: The Musical, and Jesus Christ Superstar. In 2018, Rosheuvel played a lesbian version of Othello in Othello. On television, she made her debut appearing in 2001 production of Jesus Christ Superstar aired as a part of Great Performances. She later made guest appearances on television series such as Casualty, The Bill, Torchwood, Luther, Coronation Street and Silent Witness. She had a supporting part in the 2016 period drama film Lady Macbeth.

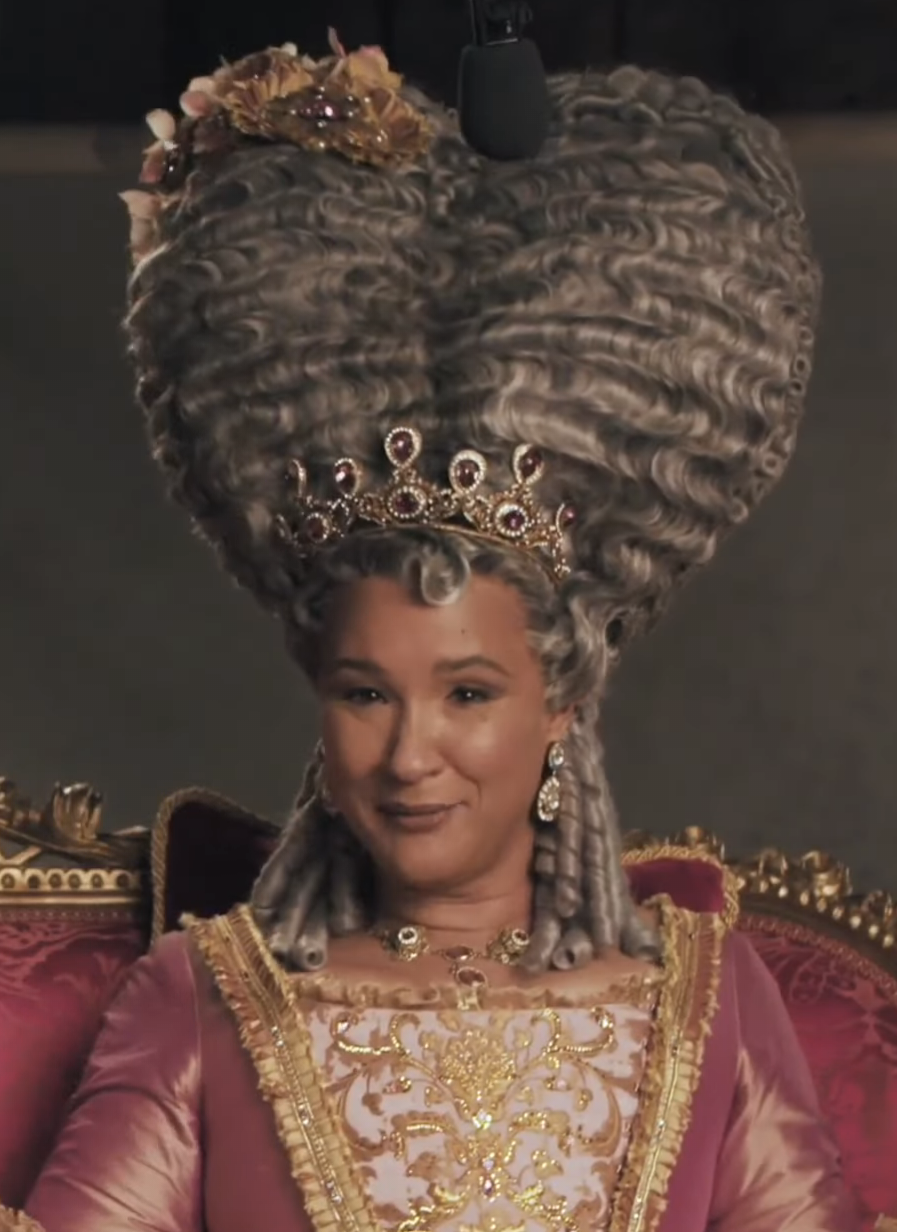
Rosheuvel as Queen Charlotte in 2023

In 2019, Rosheuvel was cast as Queen Charlotte in the Netflix period drama Bridgerton produced by Shonda Rhimes. The series premiered on 25 December 2020 with positive reviews from critics. As a cast member, Rosheuvel received Screen Actors Guild Award nomination for Outstanding Performance by an Ensemble in a Drama Series in 2021. In 2023, Rosheuvel reprised her role in its prequel series, Queen Charlotte: A Bridgerton Story.

Rosheuvel later was cast in the romantic comedy film This Time Next Year, and the horror film Somewhere in Dreamland alongside Whitney Peak and S. Epatha Merkerson.

In 2024, Rosheuvel appeared in the Doctor Who episode "Space Babies" as Jocelyn.

== Personal life ==
Her wife is writer and playwright Shireen Mula. She is a patron of An Tobar and Mull Theatre, a multi art-form creative hub on the Hebridean island of Mull.

== Filmography ==
=== Film ===
Key
†	Denotes films that have not yet been released

Year	Title	Role	Notes
2001	Lava	Warden	
2005	Coma Girl: The State of Grace	Kathy Fields	
2006	On the Other Hand	Chantelle	Short film
2014	I Remember You	Grace	Short film
2016	Lady Macbeth	Agnes	
2020	Muse	Tina	Short film
2021	Dune	Shadout Mapes	
2024	Orion and the Dark	Unexplained Noises	Voice
2024	This Time Next Year	Tara	
2025	Eye for an Eye	Patti	
2025	Grow	Dinah	

=== Television ===
Year	Title	Role	Notes
2000	Great Performances	Maid By Fire	Episode: "Jesus Christ Superstar"
2005	The Bill	Patsy Richards	Episode: "306: Show of Force"
2006	Casualty	Doctor Lorrimer	Episode: "Going Under"
2008	Torchwood	Dr Angela Connolly	Episodes: "Exit Wounds" "Dead Man Walking" and "Fragments"
2008	Consuming Passion: 100 Years of Mills & Boon	Hospital Receptionist	Television film
2011	Luther	Sally Thomas	Episode: "2.3"
2012	Coronation Street	Doctor Renshaw	Recurring role
2012	Dead Boss	Lennie	Series regular, 6 episodes
2012	Threesome	Vicar	Episode: "I Don't"
2012	Mr Stink	A local Starbucks coffee shop server	Television film
2014	Rev.	Hostel Worker	Episode: "3.4"
2015	I Live with Models	Photographer	Episode: "The Suit"
2015	EastEnders	Midwife Jenni	
2019	Silent Witness	Lyndsey Morrison	Episodes: "Betrayal: Part 1" and "Betrayal: Part 2"
2020–present	Bridgerton	Queen Charlotte	Series regular
2020	Death in Paradise	Alice Joyce	Episode 2, Series 10
2023	Queen Charlotte: A Bridgerton Story	Queen Charlotte	Miniseries; lead role
2024	Doctor Who	Jocelyn	Episode: "Space Babies"
TBA	The Dream Lands	Iona	Upcoming drama series

=== Theatre ===
Year	Title	Role	Director	Venue	Notes	Ref.
1988	Hair	Donna		—N/a	European tour	
1991	Carmen Jones		Simon Callow	The Old Vic		
1995	Fame	Miss Sherman		Aldwych Theater	Replacement; Original London Production	
1996- 1997	Tommy	Loutette / Ensemble / Acid Queen (understudy)	Des McAnuff	Shaftesbury Theatre	National premiere	
1998	Jesus Christ Superstar	Mary Magdalene	Gale Edwards	—N/a	British tour	
2001	South Pacific	Ensign Rita Gonzalez	Trevor Nunn	Royal National Theatre		
2005	Hair	Hud	Daniel Kramer	The Gate		
2006	Julius Caesar	Calphurnia	Sean Holmes	Royal Shakespeare Theatre	Royal Shakespeare Company	
2006	The Tempest	Goddess / Ariel (understudy)	Rupert Goold	Royal Shakespeare Theatre	Royal Shakespeare Company	
2006	Antony and Cleopatra	Charmian	Gregory Doran	Swan Theatre		
2007	Antony and Cleopatra	Charmian	Gregory Doran	Novello Theatre		
2007	The Tempest	Goddess / Ariel (understudy)	Rupert Goold	Novello Theatre		
2008	The White Devil		Jonathan Munby	Menier Chocolate Factory		
2009	The Winter's Tale	Paulina, Time, Old Shepherdess	Simon Godwin	Nuffield Theatre		
2009	Romeo and Juliet	Lady Capulet	Bill Buckhurst	Shakespeare's Globe		
2010	Macbeth	Lady Macbeth	Steve Marmion	Regent's Park Open Air Theatre		
2010	Juliet and Her Romeo	Nurse	Tom Morris	The Old Vic		
2011	Maret/Sade		Anthony Neilson	Royal Shakespeare Theatre	Royal Shakespeare Company	
2013	The Curious Incident of the Dog in the Night	Mrs. Shears	Marianne Elliott	National Theatre		
2014	The Gershwin' Porgy and Bess	Serena	Timothy Sheader	Regent's Park Open Air Theatre		
2014	Electra	Chorus	Ian Rickson	The Old Vic		
2015- 2016	Wonder.land	Bianca	Rufus Norris	Royal National Theatre	World premiere	
2016	A Pacifist's Guide to the War on Cancer	Laura	Bryony Kimmings	HOME Theatre	Replacement	
2017	Romeo and Juliet	Mercutio	Daniel Kramer	Shakespeare's Globe		
2017- 2018	A Christmas Carol	Ghost of Christmas Present / Mrs. Fezziwig	Matthew Warchus	The Old Vic		
2018	Othello	Othello	Gemma Bodinetz	Everyman Theatre		
2019	The American Clock	Irene / Mrs. Taylor / Rose 3	Rachel Chavkin	The Old Vic		
2020	Rare Earth Mettle	Calista McLean / Nayra Quispe	Hamish Pirie	Royal Court Theatre		

== Awards and nominations ==
Year	Award	Category	Nominated work	Result	Ref.
2021	Screen Actors Guild Awards	Outstanding Performance by an Ensemble in a Drama Series	Bridgerton	Nominated	
2024	Black Reel Awards for Television	Outstanding Supporting Performance in a Drama Series	Queen Charlotte: A Bridgerton Story	Nominated	
2024	NAACP Image Awards	Outstanding Supporting Actor in a Drama Series	Queen Charlotte: A Bridgerton Story	Nominated	
