= Ley Line Entertainment =

American film production company

Ley Line Entertainment, LLC
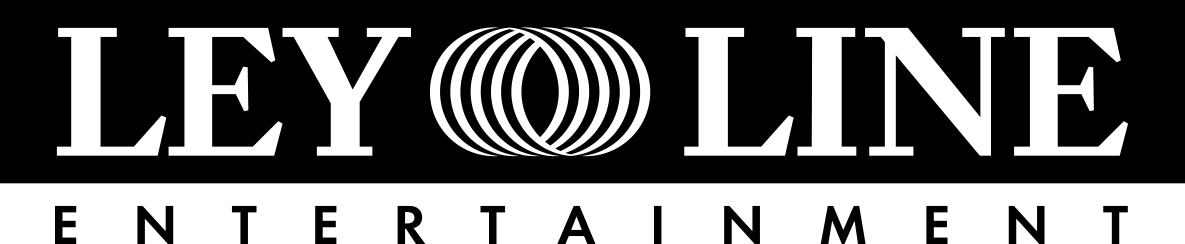
- Industry: Film industry
- Founder: Theresa Steele Page; Tim Headington
- Headquarters: Los Angeles, California, U.S.
- Area served: United States
- Website: leylineentertainment.com

Ley Line Entertainment, LLC is an American independent film production company founded in 2018 by Theresa Steele Page and Tim Headington. The company produced the films Light from Light (2019), Miss Juneteenth (2020), The Green Knight (2021), Everything Everywhere All At Once (2022) and On Swift Horses (2024).

== Overview ==
In December 2018, Theresa Steele Page and Tim Headington launched Ley Line Entertainment, a film and television production and finance company, additionally producing theater and music.

The company's first film Light from Light directed by Paul Harrill had its world premiere at the 2019 Sundance Film Festival in January 2019, and was released in November 2019, by Grasshopper Film. Early projects from the company included an original musical produced in partnership with Grammy-winning music producer Max Martin, & Juliet; a documentary of Beach Boys co-founder Brian Wilson, Brian Wilson: Long Promised Road; and The Green Knight from writer and director David Lowery. The company recorded and released the soundtrack to Brian Wilson: Long Promised Road under its Tango Records label, which featured the original song "Right Where I Belong” co-written by Brian Wilson and Jim James. The company also produced Everything Everywhere All At Once alongside A24, which won the Academy Award for Best Picture and grossed over $100 million.

In 2021, it was announced that Ley Line Entertainment would be producing the period drama film On Swift Horses, with their co-founder Tim Headington serving as one of the film’s producers. The film premiered at the 2024 Toronto International Film Festival, followed by a theatrical release in the US in April 2025, and received generally positive reviews: Metacritic, which uses a weighted average, assigned the film a score of 65 out of 100, based on 21 critics, indicating "generally favorable" reviews. However, the marketing of the film was criticised by Variety and the Washington Blade for downplaying the movie’s focus on LGBTQ characters and relationships, and for the fact that some promotional materials did not mention that these relationships were in the film at all: Variety was critical of the marketing for not mentioning the fact that the film was “a gay love story” and described the film’s official synopses as “deliberately deceptive”, while the Washington Blade noted that the film’s promotional materials “avoid directly referencing the sexuality of its two main characters” and described this marketing tactic as “not just like a miscalculation, but a slap in the face.”

Ley Line Entertainment’s philanthropic efforts include a recurring grant in partnership with filmmaker David Lowery to the Austin Film Society’s North Texas Pioneer Film Fund.

== Awards & recognition ==
& Juliet premiered on the West End in November of 2019. The play was nominated for 9 Olivier Awards and won 3.

In 2020, the independent drama film Miss Juneteenth won the Louis Black “Lone Star” Award at SXSW. In 2021 the film was nominated for four Independent Spirit Awards, including “Best First Feature.”

In 2021, “Right Where I Belong” was shortlisted for the Oscar for “Best Original Song.”

In 2022, Everything Everywhere All At Once was nominated for 11 Academy Awards and won Best Picture, Best Director, Best Actress, Best Supporting Actor, Best Original Screenplay, and Best Film Editing.

== Filmography ==
=== 2010s ===
Release Date	Title	Notes
November 1, 2019	Light from Light	distributed by Grasshopper Film

=== 2020s ===
Release Date	Title	Notes
March 31, 2020	Streetlight Harmonies	distributed by Gravitas Ventures
June 19, 2020	Miss Juneteenth	distributed by Vertical Entertainment
July 30, 2021	The Green Knight	distributed by A24
November 19, 2021	Brian Wilson: Long Promised Road	distributed by Screen Media Films
February 18, 2022	Strawberry Mansion	distributed by Music Box Films
March 25, 2022	Everything Everywhere All at Once	distributed by A24
June 2, 2023	Falcon Lake	distributed by Yellow Veil Pictures
August 23, 2024	Between the Temples	distributed by Sony Pictures Classics
January 3, 2025	The Damned	distributed by Vertical
March 28, 2025	Death of a Unicorn	distributed by A24
April 25, 2025	On Swift Horses	distributed by Sony Pictures Classics
June 20, 2025	Eye for an Eye	distributed by Vertical
November 7, 2025	All That We Love	distributed by Vertical
January 9, 2026	OBEX	distributed by Oscilloscope

=== Upcoming ===
Release Date	Title	Notes
TBA	The Steel Harp	
