= Light from Light =

Film

- Film poster
- Directed by: Paul Harrill
- Written by: Paul Harrill
- Produced by: Toby Halbrooks; Timothy Headington; James M. Johnston; Elisabeth Moss; Theresa Steele; Kelly Williams
- Starring: Marin Ireland; Jim Gaffigan; Josh Wiggins; Atheena Frizzell; David Cale
- Cinematography: Greta Zozula
- Edited by: Courtney Ware
- Music by: Adam Granduciel; Jon Natchez
- Production companies: Ley Line Entertainment; Sailor Bear; Ten Acre Films
- Distributed by: Grasshopper Film
- Release date: January 28, 2019 (Sundance)
- Running time: 82 minutes
- Country: United States
- Language: English
- Box office: $23,629

Light from Light is a 2019 American drama written and directed by Paul Harrill and starring Marin Ireland, Jim Gaffigan, Josh Wiggins, Atheena Frizzell and David Cale.

== Plot ==
Single mother Shelia (Marin Ireland), who is also raising her adolescent son Owen (Josh Wiggins), works at a car rental service counter. After her appearance on a local radio program, she's contacted about Richard (Jim Gaffigan), a recent widower who thinks his wife may be haunting his East Tennessee farmhouse. Agreeing to help, Shelia brings along Owen and his classmate Lucy (Atheena Frizzell) in hopes of understanding the mystery.

== Cast ==
- Marin Ireland as Shelia
- Jim Gaffigan as Richard
- Josh Wiggins as Owen
- Atheena Frizzell as Lucy
- David Cale as Father Martin

== Production ==
The film was shot in and around Knoxville, Tennessee in July and August 2018. Additional filming locations included the Buffalo Springs Fish Hatchery in Grainger County, Tennessee, the McGhee Tyson Airport in Alcoa, Tennessee, the Strong Stock Farm in Mascot, Tennessee, and the Great Smoky Mountains National Park.

== Reception ==
As of October 2021, the film holds a 93% approval rating on Rotten Tomatoes, based on 41 reviews with an average rating of 7.6/10. The website's critics consensus reads: "A paranormally tinged drama with a deceptively gentle touch, Light from Light sinks its hooks into the audience gradually but isn't quick to let go." Metacritic, which uses a weighted average, assigned the film a score of 80 out of 100, based on 14 critics, indicating "generally favorable" reviews.

== See also ==
- List of drama films of the 2010s
