= On Swift Horses =

2024 film by Daniel Minahan

- Theatrical release poster
- Directed by: Daniel Minahan
- Screenplay by: Bryce Kass
- Based on: On Swift Horses by Shannon Pufahl
- Produced by: Peter Spears; Daniel Minahan; Tim Headington; Mollye Asher; Theresa Steele Page; Michael D'Alto
- Starring: Daisy Edgar-Jones; Jacob Elordi; Will Poulter; Diego Calva; Sasha Calle
- Cinematography: Luc Montpellier
- Edited by: Joe Murphy; Robert Frazen; Kate Sanford
- Music by: Mark Orton
- Production companies: Ley Line Entertainment; FirstGen Content; Cor Cordium; Wavelength
- Distributed by: Sony Pictures Classics
- Release dates: September 7, 2024 (TIFF); April 25, 2025 (United States)
- Running time: 119 minutes
- Country: United States
- Language: English
- Box office: $1.2 million

On Swift Horses is a 2024 American historical romantic drama film directed by Daniel Minahan. The screenplay by Bryce Kass is based on the 2019 novel of the same name by Shannon Pufahl. The film stars Daisy Edgar-Jones, Jacob Elordi, Will Poulter, Diego Calva and Sasha Calle. Set in 1950s America and Mexico, it follows two interconnected stories of queer love: one in Las Vegas, where casino workers Julius (Elordi) and Henry (Calva) fall in love, and the other in San Diego, where Julius' sister-in-law Muriel (Edgar-Jones) becomes torn between her husband Lee (Poulter) and her neighbor Sandra (Calle).

The film had its world premiere at the 2024 Toronto International Film Festival on September 7, 2024, and was released in the United States by Sony Pictures Classics on April 25, 2025. It was nominated for the GLAAD Media Award for Outstanding Film – Wide Release, and Calle won the Imagen Award for Best Supporting Actress.

== Plot ==
In the 1950s, Julius Walker travels to Kansas to spend Christmas with his brother Lee and Lee’s girlfriend Muriel, following the end of his Navy service in the Korean War. Later that evening, Muriel accepts Lee's proposal of marriage, and they plan to move from Kansas to California once Lee has finished his own military service, where Julius is invited to come and live with them in due course. Six months later, Muriel and Lee have married and are living in San Diego, but Julius prefers to follow his own path in life and decides to travel to Las Vegas instead.

In Las Vegas, Julius is hired by manager Terence to work in surveillance at a casino, looking down from the loft through a one-way mirror to try and spot people who are attempting to cheat at cards. At the casino he befriends Henry, a Mexican colleague working alongside him in the loft. They begin to grow closer after Henry collapses in Julius' arms one day while working during a heatwave. Afterwards, Henry takes Julius out for an atomic cocktail to thank him for taking care of him, and as the evening goes on it becomes clear they are falling in love with each other. Later that night, they go back to Julius' motel room where they make love for the first time. As their relationship progresses, the two men move in together, and Julius tells Henry that this is the first time in his life he has felt this way, and that he now believes he has a future to look forward to.

Back in San Diego, Muriel is dissatisfied with the daily grind of working as a waitress and decides to try her luck at betting on horse racing, where she quickly scores a major win. Her success enables her and Lee to afford a new house in the outskirts of the city, although she keeps her gambling a secret from her husband and instead pretends that she got the money by selling her old home in Kansas. While touring potential new houses, Muriel meets a woman called Sandra who lives near one of the properties in question, and they are instantly drawn to each other, which convinces Muriel that this is the place where she wants to buy a new home. Meanwhile, Julius and Henry begin to go out gambling together in Las Vegas with great success, including notable victories at a casino called Aces High. However, Henry wants to take things further by using cheating to win, as an act of defiance against a world in which they must keep their love a secret. Julius is nervous about taking this kind of risk but eventually agrees to Henry's plan.

In San Diego, Muriel takes further risks at gambling when she returns to the racetrack to make another bet on a horse, where she encounters a woman named Gail who has bet on the same one. When their horse wins the race, the two women celebrate and Gail kisses Muriel on the lips. Afterwards, Gail gives Muriel a matchbook with the name of the Chester Hotel & Bar on it, implying that this is a place with a special significance. Later, Muriel checks out the hotel, and finds it is a secret meeting place for queer people. After Muriel’s discovery, she goes to see Sandra, who she has now realized is a lesbian, and makes it clear she is attracted to her. The two women kiss and begin a secret affair.

Back in Las Vegas, Julius and Henry's life together goes awry when Henry decides to try cheating at cards at the casino they work at and is apprehended by the management. In an effort to protect Julius, Henry denies that Julius was involved in any of the cheating, but Terence fires Julius anyway and ejects him from the premises. After Henry fails to return to their motel room afterwards, Julius worries that something has happened to his lover and becomes desperate to find him again.

Julius returns to San Diego to seek help from Lee and Muriel, and opens up to Muriel about Henry. He explains that he loves him and is determined to find him again, and asks her for money so that he can begin his search. Muriel is disappointed to learn he only came back to see them because he needed financial help, and requests that he leave. Following this conversation, she goes to bed, leaving Julius sitting outside on his own. Later that night, Muriel dreams of Julius kissing her in her bedroom, but she wakes up to find that the kiss did not really happen and that Julius has actually left the house. (Note: The music used in the dream sequence is also titled "Dream of a Kiss" on the official soundtrack.) After his departure, Muriel discovers that he has stolen some of the money she and Lee had been saving together, which Julius has taken in order to finance his quest to find Henry.

Muriel continues her affair with Sandra, meeting in secret in the afternoons at the latter's house. However, a disagreement one day leads Sandra to conclude that Muriel is not serious about her, and despite Muriel trying to convince Sandra that she has been misunderstood, Sandra decides to end the relationship. (Note: The film's choice to split up Muriel and Sandra is a huge change from the source material: in the original novel, Muriel and Sandra stay together, there is no split, and Sandra never suggests that Muriel is not serious about their relationship. In the book, Muriel also leaves Lee specifically to be with Sandra, in contrast to the film where Sandra has already broken up with Muriel by the time Lee becomes aware of the situation. In addition, it is made clear in the source material that the two women will be going to Kansas together, and Muriel's final chapter in the novel concludes with her making preparations to move there with Sandra. The filmmakers have not publicly acknowledged that this storyline was different in the original novel, and have not discussed the reasons why they chose to dismantle the relationship and end the film with Muriel on her own instead.) Lee arrives home unexpectedly early and witnesses the two women arguing about the situation on Sandra's doorstep, and he begins to realize that they have been romantically involved with each other. Afterwards, Lee and Muriel go back to their house and talk, and they both realize that their marriage is over. Muriel packs her bags and leaves the house, with a sad glance over at Sandra’s home on her way out. Later, Lee discovers that Muriel has left him the rest of her gambling winnings, along with a note saying she hopes he can use this money to help fulfil his dreams.

Meanwhile, Julius has crossed the border to Mexico, where he travels to Tijuana to begin a desperate search for Henry. However, in a twist, it turns out that Henry is not in Mexico after all but is actually in San Diego looking for Julius and is unaware that Julius is in Mexico and that they are both looking for each other in different places at the same time. At the Chester Hotel, Henry runs into Muriel, who has been staying there following the end of her marriage, although neither of them is aware that the other knows Julius. Just before leaving the hotel, Muriel finds a bulletin board in the lobby where people leave messages for those with whom they have lost contact. She writes a note telling Julius she is sorry and says “goodbye” as she pins it to the board. After leaving San Diego, Muriel returns to Kansas and moves back in to her old home, finally free to live life on her own terms.

The following Christmas, Julius returns from Mexico to San Diego, where he writes an apologetic letter to Muriel telling her he is sorry for stealing from her, and wishes her well for the future. Julius then visits the Chester Hotel, where he sees Muriel’s note on the board in the lobby on the way out. However, he is overwhelmed to discover that Henry has also left a note for him there, in which he asks Julius to come back and meet him at the Aces High casino in Las Vegas. Julius is very emotional at finally making contact with his lover after searching for him for so long, and he takes the note and rushes away from the hotel, mounting his horse to begin the journey back to the city where he and Henry first met. As time goes by, Julius eventually reaches the outskirts of Las Vegas, where he rides down the road on his horse towards his reunion with Henry. (Note: The audio description track on the Sony Pictures Classics DVD of the film identifies the city shown on the horizon in the last scene as Las Vegas: “At daybreak, Julius rides the horse down a highway in the desert. The Las Vegas skyline glows in the distance ahead of him.”) (Note: While the film fades to black before we see the two men reunite on screen, Daniel Minahan has confirmed that Julius and Henry do find each other again: “Our intention was that he's going to find Henry and meet him again in Las Vegas.")

== Cast ==
- Daisy Edgar-Jones as Muriel Edwards, Lee's wife
- Jacob Elordi as Julius Walker, Lee's brother and a Korean War veteran
- Will Poulter as Lee Walker, Muriel's husband and Julius' brother
- Diego Calva as Henry, Julius' lover
- Sasha Calle as Sandra Gutiérrez, Muriel's neighbor and lover
- Kat Cunning as Gail, a gambler in San Diego
- Andrew Keenan-Bolger as Rosie, a jockey in San Diego
- Don Swayze as Terence, a casino manager in Las Vegas

== Production ==
=== Development ===
The original novel by Shannon Pufahl was first published in November 2019. In July 2021, producer Peter Spears and director Daniel Minahan announced that they were developing a film adaptation of the book with Tim Headington and his production company Ley Line Entertainment, and that Bryce Kass would be writing the script. Mollye Asher and Michael D'Alto of FirstGen Content, along with Theresa Steele Page of Ley Line Entertainment, would later join Spears, Minahan and Headington as producers. The film would ultimately be billed as a Ley Line Entertainment and FirstGen Content production in association with Spears' production company Cor Cordium, The Dan Corp and Wavelength. The film also marked a reunion for Asher and Spears following their success as two of the producers of the Oscar-winning film Nomadland. The film's executive producers would later be confirmed as Nate Kamiya and David Darby for Ley Line Entertainment, Randal Sandler, Claude Amadeo and Chris Triana for FirstGen, Jennifer Westphal and Joe Plummer for Wavelength, and Teddy Schwarzman and John Friedberg for Black Bear, in addition to Christine Vachon, Mason Plotts, Bryce Kass, Alvaro Valente, Daisy Edgar-Jones, Lauren Shelton, Jacob Elordi and Jeffrey Penman.

When the film was announced as being in production in February 2023, Deadline stated that Killer Films were also one of the production companies involved, and the company’s co-founders Christine Vachon and Pamela Koffler were both listed as executive producers. However, by the time of the world premiere in September 2024, Koffler's name had been taken off the film, and the company’s name was not listed in TIFF's online credits for the project. Despite this, when Sony Pictures Classics announced in October 2024 that they had bought the distribution rights for the film, Killer Films were still listed in the official press release as one of the companies involved, and continued to be mentioned in SPC’s later press material for the film, although neither the company’s name nor logo appear on the film’s marketing materials alongside those belonging to the other companies involved. There has been no public comment from Killer Films or Sony Pictures Classics on the reasons for these discrepancies.

=== Filming ===
Principal photography was confirmed to be underway in Los Angeles on February 28, 2023. Diego Calva told Variety that he and Jacob Elordi have some "pretty hot scenes", and later said in an interview with Attitude that he "had like a neck pain for the first week from just kissing" Elordi.

=== Music ===
The original score for the film was composed by Mark Orton. An original song for the film, "Song for Henry", focusing on Julius' love for Henry and his determination to find him again, was written by the singer-songwriter Loren Kramar and Sean O'Brien and performed by Kramar for the soundtrack. In a post on Instagram, Kramar said: "To be a part of this project, which has everything to do with queer lives and the ongoing pursuit of self, is a privilege." The soundtrack was digitally released by Madison Gate Records on April 25, 2025, the same day as the film's theatrical release in the United States. In addition to Orton's original score and Kramar's "Song for Henry", the soundtrack also included Kramar's a cappella cover version of the 1950s song "Mr. Blue" (originally written by Dewayne Blackwell), which is featured during the opening credits of the film.

== Release ==
The film had its world premiere at the 2024 Toronto International Film Festival on September 7, 2024. In October 2024, Sony Pictures Classics announced that they had acquired distribution rights in North and Latin America, Turkey, Scandinavia, Eastern Europe, Southeast Asia, India, Italy, Australia and New Zealand. A Variety article, drawn from conversations with SPC co-president Michael Barker, mentioned the film as being a part of the company's slate for the following year. Following TIFF, the film was next shown in public as the Secret Screening at the Palm Springs International Film Festival on January 10, 2025. It was also the closing night film for the 2025 edition of South by Southwest, where it screened on March 13, 2025. The film was released in the US on April 25, 2025. In France it was released under the title Les Indomptés (The Untamed) by Metropolitan Filmexport on April 30, 2025. In Spain it was released under the title Indomables (Indomitable) by the indie distributor Beta Fiction Spain on August 8, 2025. It was released in the UK and Ireland by Sony on September 5, 2025.

== Marketing ==
The marketing of the film has been criticised by publications including Variety and the Washington Blade for frequently downplaying, and sometimes erasing, the fact that many of the characters are LGBTQ and that there are same-sex relationships in the film; the marketing was also criticised for straightwashing the promotional materials by falsely implying that the film includes a love affair between the characters played by Daisy Edgar-Jones and Jacob Elordi, when no affair actually takes place between them, and both are involved in same-sex romantic relationships with other characters instead. The misleading nature of the film's marketing was also highlighted by other outlets including The Observer and The Conversation.

Variety's chief film critic Peter Debruge noted in his review that the film was "a gay love story" and pointed out that this had not been mentioned in some of the official marketing materials. "It feels like the opposite of a spoiler — something between a consumer service and a selling point — to address what the festival capsules only coyly imply, using phrases like "self-discovery" (Toronto) and "exploring a love she never dreamed possible" (SXSW)." Debruge also stated that official plot synopses for the film had been "deliberately deceptive" and misled people about the nature of the connection between the male and female leads, as well as the fact that these synopses avoid mentioning that both characters are actually involved in same-sex relationships in the film. "The... queer period drama explores the challenges of coming out in the 1950s, as two characters attracted not to one another — as those deliberately deceptive plot synopses would have you think — but to members of their own genders."

The Washington Blade, the oldest LGBTQ newspaper in the US, praised the film but criticised the way it had been promoted, noting that "Sony Pictures' promotions avoid referencing queer sexuality of main characters." In a review, John Paul King said: "You might not know it from the publicity campaign, but the latest big-screen project for breakout "Euphoria" actor and sex symbol Jacob Elordi is 100% a gay love story" and "unequivocally a "Queer Movie"." King described the relationship between Elordi and Diego Calva's character as "joyously queer-affirming", and went on to criticise the fact that the promotion of the film had downplayed this: "Sony Pictures' promotions for the film – which avoid directly referencing the sexuality of its two main characters, instead hinting at "secret desires" and implying a romantic connection between Elordi and Edgar-Jones – feels not just like a miscalculation, but a slap in the face." The review concluded by commenting that the film's positive message about queer relationships should be something to be highlighted, not concealed in the marketing: "Though it's an eloquent, quietly insightful look back at American cultural history, it incorporates those observations into a wistful, bittersweet, but somehow impossibly hopeful story that emphasizes the validity of queer love. That's something to be celebrated, not buried."

In a review for The Conversation, Kate McNicholas Smith observed, "That this is a queer film is not immediately obvious from its publicity. In fact, promotional materials might lead audiences to assume that Muriel and Julius embark upon an affair," when both characters are actually queer and do not have an affair with each other. Meanwhile, Guy Lodge noted in The Observer that "the marketing led people to expect a swooning romance between Jacob Elordi and Daisy Edgar-Jones. In fact, it’s a sensitively drawn and classically styled queer love story, in which the stars play siblings-in-law Julius and Muriel – a fine Will Poulter plays Lee, his brother and her husband – tentatively exploring same-sex desires in a 1950s US... Julius is a languidly charismatic drifter, newly returned from the Korean war, with a penchant for gambling that leads him to Las Vegas, where he falls into the arms of casino worker Henry (Diego Calva). Muriel... develops a horse-betting habit; more significantly, she can’t get her neighbour Sandra (Sasha Calle) off her mind."

== Reception ==
=== Box office ===
In the United States and Canada, On Swift Horses opened alongside The Accountant 2, Until Dawn, The Legend of Ochi, Cheech & Chong's Last Movie, and the 2025 re-releases of Star Wars: Episode III – Revenge of the Sith, Happy Gilmore, and Pink Floyd: Live at Pompeii, and grossed $542,360 during the weekend of April 25–27, ranking 14th at the box office. As of 4 November 2025, the film had made $1 million at the domestic box office and $200,000 in other territories, for a worldwide total of $1.2 million.

=== Critical response ===
On the review aggregator website Rotten Tomatoes, 53% of 131 critics' reviews are positive, with an average rating of 5.6/10. The website's consensus reads: "On Swift Horses capitalizes on a steadfast cast while grappling with contemplatively rich themes of society, sexuality, and morality to a mostly astute end." Metacritic, which uses a weighted average, assigned the film a score of 63 out of 100, based on 26 critics, indicating "generally favorable" reviews.

Jourdain Searles of The Hollywood Reporter wrote that the film is "beautiful, heartbreaking, and demands to be seen on the biggest screen possible. Elordi gives his best performance yet as Julius, showing his more sensitive, vulnerable side on the big screen for perhaps the first time. His love scenes with Calva are tender and exciting... Calva proves his memorable turn in the underrated Babylon two years ago was just a warm-up. He's got so much more to offer." Regarding Edgar-Jones, Searles wrote that "in perhaps her meatiest role since Normal People, Edgar-Jones gives an understated performance as Muriel, letting us get to know her through subtle gestures and expressions."

Nicolas Rapold, the former editor of Film Comment, described the film as a "beautifully realised 1950s romance" in a review for the Financial Times, and wrote that "Minahan and his cast don't reduce Julius's or Muriel's affairs to a vehicle for prestige tragedy or steamy entertainment. Their experiences feel as if they might reflect any one of countless lives or loves constrained by social conformity and bias at the time. While glamour could dazzle on screens and red carpets at the festival, the handsome stars...are put in the service of something that at times can feel even rarer—ordinary emotional truths."

Meanwhile, in a more dissenting review, Pete Hammond of Deadline Hollywood contended that too many plot developments are interwoven "throughout this disjointed movie, which can't seem to decide which thread to follow or which character to focus on, and so it does it all. Edgar-Jones also seems to have a tough time getting a real handle on just who Muriel is... Elordi is becoming one of the most interesting actors around, especially after Saltburn and Euphoria have cemented his sex symbol bona fides. If they ever remake Hud, he's the guy. However, it is Calva, the discovery from Damien Chazelle's Babylon, who is the standout, an intriguing character to be sure. And Calva hits all the right notes—in and out of bed with Elordi. [Also] Montpellier's golden-hued cinematography really reflects California's allure of the times, and the film looks terrific."

Germany's leading queer magazine wrote: "The two boys work nights at the casino and spend their days in bed together having sex in their fine ribs. Fans of soap operas will get their money's worth, as will Elordi fans. Everyone else can look forward to a satire of the unintentional kind."

=== Accolades ===
Awards and nominations received by On Swift Horses
Award	Year	Category	Nominee(s)	Result	Ref.
Imagen Awards	2025	Best Supporting Actress	Sasha Calle	Won	
Imagen Awards	2025	Best Supporting Actor	Diego Calva	Nominated	
GLAAD Media Awards	2026	Outstanding Film – Wide Release	On Swift Horses	Nominated	

== See also ==
- List of films set in Las Vegas
- List of LGBTQ-related films
