= Timothy Headington =

American billionaire (born 1950)

- Born: 1950 (age 75–76)
- Education: University of Oklahoma; Fuller Theological Seminary
- Occupations: President and owner, Headington Resources, Inc

Timothy Clare Headington (born 1950) is an American billionaire, the CEO and owner of Headington Oil, a film producer, and real estate developer.

== Early life ==
Timothy Clare Headington is the son of a geologist father, Clare W. Headington, and Catherine Meyer Headington. He has a brother, Gregory Headington, and a sister, Jeanette Kern.

Headington attended the University of Oklahoma on a tennis scholarship and graduated with a Bachelor of Arts degree in history. He received graduate degrees in theology and psychology from Fuller Theological Seminary in Pasadena, California, and completed his psychology residency at LA County Hospital.

In 2011, he received an honorary doctorate from the University of Oklahoma, his alma mater.

== Career ==
=== 'Oil Industry ===
Headington founded Headington Oil in 1978, in Oklahoma City. In 1984, he moved his company to Dallas.

Headington is currently president and sole shareholder of Headington Resources, Inc., a Dallas-headquartered company. The company concentrates primarily on oil and natural gas, real estate/hotel development, film production, private equity, and entertainment. Headington is an active philanthropist, personally and through various family foundations.

In 2008, Headington sold acreage in North Dakota's Bakken oil play to XTO Energy for $1.85 billion.

=== Entertainment ===
Headington was invested in GK Films with British Academy Award-winning producer Graham King from 2007 until 2012. He formed Tango Entertainment alongside Lia Buman in 2017 and Ley Line Entertainment alongside Theresa Steele Page in 2018.

As a film producer/executive producer, Headington has worked on numerous projects including Hugo (co-producer) and World War Z (EP credit).

Headington produced Angelina Jolie's feature directorial debut, In the Land of Blood and Honey. The movie won the Stanley Kramer for “(an) achievement or contribution (that) illuminates provocative social issues in an accessible and elevating fashion.” He was an executive producer on Gore Verbinski's animated film Rango.

Other productions include The Young Victoria, The Tourist, Edge of Darkness, The Rum Diary, and the TV miniseries Camelot.

In 2013, Headington partnered with Grammy Award winning music producer Max Martin to produce the musical "&Juliet." The play premiered in London at the Shaftesbury theater in November 2019. It received nine Olivier Award nominations in 2020, winning three.

In 2021, it was announced that Headington and his production company Ley Line Entertainment would be producing the period drama film On Swift Horses. The film premiered at the 2024 Toronto International Film Festival, followed by a theatrical release in the US in April 2025, and received generally positive reviews: Metacritic, which uses a weighted average, assigned the film a score of 65 out of 100, based on 21 critics, indicating "generally favorable" reviews. However, the marketing of the film was criticised by Variety and the Washington Blade for downplaying the movie’s focus on LGBTQ characters and relationships, and for the fact that some promotional materials did not mention that these relationships were in the film at all: Variety was critical of the marketing for not mentioning the fact that the film was “a gay love story” and described the film’s official synopses as “deliberately deceptive”, while the Washington Blade noted that the film’s promotional materials “avoid directly referencing the sexuality of its two main characters” and described this marketing tactic as “not just like a miscalculation, but a slap in the face.”

=== Real Estate ===
Heading developed The Joule, formerly the Dallas National Bank building, in 2008.

Renovation of the former Republic National Bank building, now transformed into the Drakestone, a 20-floor apartment building, was completed in 2003.

== Philanthropy ==
Headington is co-founder of the nonprofit Headington Institute, headquartered in Pasadena, California. Its mission is to support first responders and caregivers worldwide who have experienced emotional trauma.

== Honors ==
Headington was inducted into the Oklahoma Hall of Fame in November 2013.

== Personal life ==
He lives in Dallas, Texas.

== Filmography ==
Producer

- The Young Victoria (2009)
- Edge of Darkness (2010)
- London Boulevard (2010)
- The Tourist (2010)
- Hugo (2011)
- The Rum Diary (2011)
- In the Land of Blood and Honey (2011)
- Little Woods (2018)
- Delirium (2018)
- Light from Light (2019)
- Blow the Man Down (2019)
- Never Rarely Sometimes Always (2020)
- Miss Juneteenth (2020)
- Little Fish (2020)
- Together Together (2021)
- The Green Knight (2021)
- Resurrection (2022)
- Weird: The Al Yankovic Story (2022)
- His Three Daughters (2023)
- Between the Temples (2023)
- Spaceman (2024)
- The Damned (2024)
- All That We Love (2024)
- On Swift Horses (2024)
- Together (2025
- Death of a Unicorn (2025)
- Eye for an Eye (2025)
- The Surgeon (2026)

Executive producer

- Rango (2011)
- Dark Shadows (2011)
- Camelot (2011)
- Argo (2012)
- World War Z (2012)
- Jersey Boys (2014)
- The Old Man & the Gun (2018)
- Get Duked! (2018)
- Come to Daddy (2018)
- How to Build a Girl (2019)
- Strawberry Mansion (2021)
- Italian Studies (2021)
- Everything Everywhere All at Once (2022)
- Brian Wilson: Long Promised Road (2022)
- Shortcomings (2023)
- Booger (2023)
- Housekeeping for Beginners (2023)
- Dreams in Nightmares (2024)
- Sorry, Baby (2025)
- The History of Sound (2025)

Supervising producer

- The Challenge (2008)
