= Sasha Calle =

American actress (born 1995)

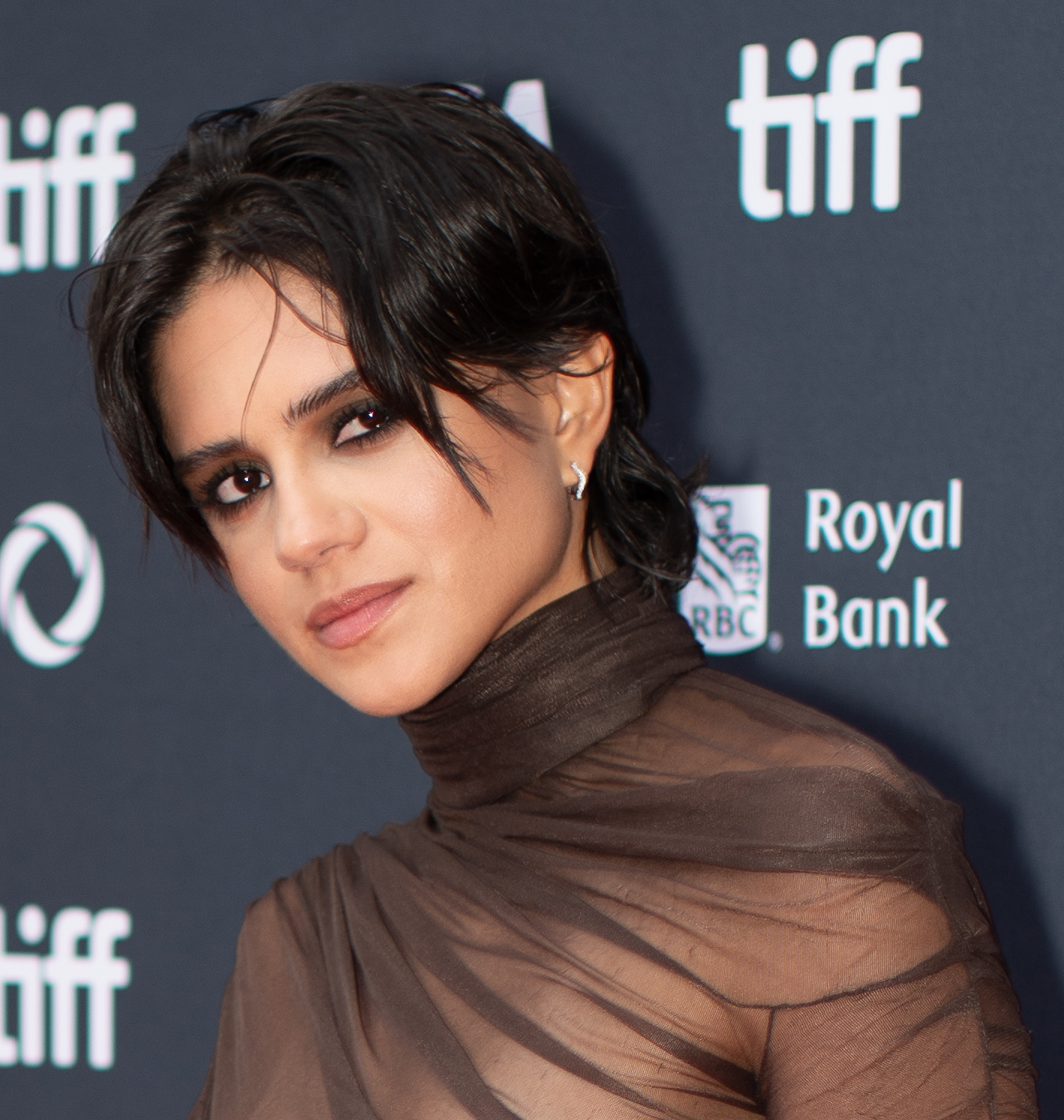
- Calle at the 2024 Toronto International Film Festival
- Born: August 7, 1995 (age 31); Boston, Massachusetts, U.S.
- Education: American Musical and Dramatic Academy (BFA)
- Occupation: Actress
- Years active: 2017–present

Sasha Calle (Spanish: [ˈsaʃa ˈkaʝe]; born August 7, 1995) is an American actress. She starred in the soap opera The Young and the Restless from 2018 to 2021, for which she received a nomination for a Daytime Emmy Award. She made her film debut as Supergirl in the superhero film The Flash (2023).

== Early life ==
Sasha Calle was born in Boston, Massachusetts. She is of Colombian descent. She has a younger brother. She and her mother moved to Colombia when she was ten and moved back to the U.S. after two years. Attended South Broward High School for a few years. At age 17, Calle relocated from Miami to Los Angeles to attend the American Musical and Dramatic Academy, from which she graduated in 2017 and obtained a Bachelor of Fine Arts degree.

== Career ==
In September 2018, Calle joined the cast of the CBS soap opera The Young and the Restless as chef Lola Rosales. She appeared in over 270 episodes and was nominated for Daytime Emmy Award for Outstanding Younger Performer in a Drama Series in 2020 for her performance.

In her feature film debut, Calle portrayed Kara Zor-El / Supergirl in the superhero film The Flash, set in the DC Extended Universe (DCEU). She was the first Latina actress to play the role. Released in June 2023, The Flash received mixed reviews, but Calle received praise for her performance as Supergirl. The combined factors of the film's poor financial performance (largely attributed to lead actor Ezra Miller's legal troubles), Warner Bros. replacing the leadership of DC Studios, and the impending reboot of the DCEU in the form of the DC Universe (DCU) meant her intended multi-project presence never came to be, and the role of Supergirl was ultimately recast with Milly Alcock for the next project featuring the character, the DCU film Supergirl (2026), in addition to an uncredited cameo in the preceding film Superman (2025).

Calle next starred in the drama film On Swift Horses, which was released in September 2024 to generally favorable reviews. In 2026, she appeared in the Netflix film The Rip.

== Personal life ==
In a 2024 interview with The Hollywood Reporter, Calle mentioned that she is queer.

== Filmography ==
=== Film ===
Key
†	Denotes films that have not yet been released

Year	Title	Role	Notes	Ref.
2023	The Flash	Kara Zor-El / Supergirl		
2024	In the Summers	Eva		
2024	On Swift Horses	Sandra Gutiérrez		
2026	The Rip	Desiree "Desi" Lopez Molina		
2026	Wardriver	Sarah		
2027	The Exorcist: Martyrs †	Gina Restrepo	Post-production	
TBA	Lips Like Sugar †	Andi Campos	Post-production	

=== Television ===
Year	Title	Role	Notes	Ref.
2017	Socially Awkward	Virginia	Miniseries	
2018–2021	The Young and the Restless	Lola Rosales	Main role	
2026	Sugar	Val	Main role (season 2)	

== Accolades ==
Award	Year	Category	Work	Result	Ref.
Daytime Emmy Award	2020	Outstanding Younger Performer in a Drama Series	The Young and the Restless	Nominated	
Imagen Awards	2025	Best Supporting Actress	On Swift Horses	Won	
