= All That We Love =

2024 American drama film

- Official poster
- Directed by: Yen Tan
- Written by: Yen Tan; Clay Liford
- Produced by: Jonathan Duffy; Kelly Williams; Rebecca Green; Tim Headington; Theresa Steele Page
- Starring: Margaret Cho; Kenneth Choi; Alice Lee; Atsuko Okatsuka; Devon Bostick; Missi Pyle; Jesse Tyler Ferguson
- Cinematography: Jon Keng
- Edited by: Yang Hua Hu
- Music by: Jon Natchez
- Production companies: Ley Line Entertainment; Unapologetic Projects; Ten Acre Films
- Distributed by: Vertical
- Release dates: June 8, 2024 (Tribeca); November 7, 2025
- Running time: 90 minutes
- Country: United States
- Language: English

All That We Love is a 2024 American drama film directed by Yen Tan, from a screenplay by Tan and Clay Liford. It stars Margaret Cho, Kenneth Choi, Alice Lee, Atsuko Okatsuka, Devon Bostick, Missi Pyle and Jesse Tyler Ferguson.

It had its world premiere at the 2024 Tribeca Festival on June 8, 2024, and was released on November 7, 2025, by Vertical.

== Plot ==
Emma, a single, divorced empty nester deals with the recent changes in her life: Her best friend, Stan, is going through a mid-life crisis several years following his partner Craig's death; her daughter Maggie confesses that she will be moving to Australia with her Australian boyfriend, Nate; Tanner, Emma's faithful dog, dies of sickness and old age.

Emma tries to adopt another dog, Sal, but its aggressive behavior causes her to return it. Stan matches her up with an acquaintance for a date, but she turns him down superficially due to his name. Meanwhile, she struggles to hide her disapproval of Maggie and Nate's moving plans and Nate himself, further estranging her from Maggie. While attending Stan's birthday party, she gives him a framed photo of him and his deceased partner, which upsets Stan, who is trying to move on with his life.

Emma learns from her ex-sister-in-law, Raven, that Andy, her estranged ex-husband, is back in town. He abandoned Emma and Maggie during her childhood to become an actor, and had a successful career and marriage in Singapore, before his alcohol addiction ruined both. Unable to find work in Singapore, he returned to California and has committed to sobriety. Reconnecting with Andy, despite her misgivings, results in the two of them having sex. Raven privately expresses concern about old triggers potentially affecting Andy's sobriety, and Emma decides to abruptly end things with him. She seeks solace from her work friend, Kayla, who helps her invoke Tanner's spirit to help her adjust to the changes in her life.

Later, during an argument with Stan about his new lifestyle, and not understanding his need to move on with his life with Craig, Emma accidentally admits having reconnected with Andy. Stan is furious and incredulous at the news, having supported Emma and Maggie for years during Andy's absence, and asks her if she has considered how this would affect Maggie, who was deeply hurt by Andy's departure. They do not see each other again until Maggie's farewell party. Maggie gives a heartfelt toast to Emma and Stan for raising her, and also toasts to Tanner, which touches Maggie. However, when Emma and Stan argue at the party, Maggie learns that her father has returned and that Emma reconnected with him. When Emma suggests that Maggie should meet with Andy for closure and to see that he has changed, Maggie angrily kicks both Emma and Stan out of the party.

Emma and Stan reconcile and reflect on Craig and the past, with Stan offering to give Andy another chance if Emma believes in him. The next morning, after receiving some advice from Nate, Maggie offers to meet Andy at a local diner, though Emma is concerned that Andy's struggles will prevent him from being there on time. He surprises her by making it there. Maggie arrives and decides to leave, but Emma convinces her to stay and just have a meal together, with no further obligations. When they finish, Andy apologizes to Maggie, and Maggie wishes him well on his new life. Emma sees Nate and Maggie off to the airport and decides to give her blind date a call back. She gives Sal another try and promises not to return him. As she and Sal get along this time, Tanner's spirit observes them and departs.

== Cast ==
- Margaret Cho as Emma
- Kenneth Choi as Andy
- Alice Lee as Maggie
- Atsuko Okatsuka as Raven
- Devon Bostick as Nate
- Missi Pyle as Kayla
- Jesse Tyler Ferguson as Stan

== Release ==
It had its world premiere at the 2024 Tribeca Festival on June 8, 2024. In September 2025, Vertical acquired distribution rights to the film, and released it on November 7, 2025.

== Reception ==
=== Critical reception ===
On the review aggregator website Rotten Tomatoes, 100% of 19 critics' reviews are positive.
