= Thrash (film) =

2026 film by Tommy Wirkola

- Release poster
- Directed by: Tommy Wirkola
- Written by: Tommy Wirkola
- Produced by: Adam McKay; Kevin Messick; Tommy Wirkola
- Starring: Phoebe Dynevor; Whitney Peak; Djimon Hounsou
- Cinematography: Matt Weston
- Edited by: Martin Stoltz
- Music by: Dom Lewis; Daniel Futcher
- Production companies: Sony Pictures; Hyperobject Industries
- Distributed by: Netflix
- Release date: April 10, 2026
- Running time: 86 minutes
- Country: United States
- Language: English

Thrash is a 2026 American survival thriller film written and directed by Tommy Wirkola. It stars Phoebe Dynevor, Whitney Peak, and Djimon Hounsou. The film sees a coastal town face a Category 5 hurricane whose flooding brings in ravenous sharks. Wirkola produced with Adam McKay and Kevin Messick of Hyperobject Industries.

Sony Pictures officially announced the film in May 2024. Filming started that July in Melbourne. Initially planned to release in theaters, Sony transferred the distribution rights to Netflix for a streaming release. The title went through numerous changes, including Beneath the Storm and Shiver.

Thrash was released in the United States on April 10, 2026. It received mixed reviews from critics.

== Plot ==
The town of Annieville, South Carolina, awaits the arrival of Category 5 hurricane Henry. Despite the imminent danger, Dakota finds herself unable to leave her recently-deceased mother's house due to her agoraphobia, while the heavily pregnant Lisa is caught in town unable to evacuate in time. Outside of town, siblings Dee, Ron and Will are forced to shelter with their unprepared foster parents Billy and Rachel.

The hurricane hits and the storm surge destroys the town's sea wall, causing Annieville to flood and cause massive damage, including breaking open a tanker truck carrying animal blood which draws sharks to the flooded downtown area. Dakota sees Lisa trapped in her car and rescues her, bringing her back to her house. Dakota's uncle Dale, a marine researcher, enlists a visiting TV news crew to help him get to Annieville to evacuate Dakota; along the way they discover that a large great white shark they had tagged named Nellie is in the Annieville area. With the roads blocked by flooding, Dale and the TV crew continue on by boat.

After their house floods, Billy and Rachel try to reach their snorkel-equipped pick-up truck outside but are attacked by bull sharks in the flood waters, killing Rachel and maiming Billy. Billy manages to swim back to the safety of the house, where he tries to convince Ron to go back to the truck but they have an argument after the siblings discover that Billy had been keeping their government welfare payments for himself. Billy struggles with Ron before Dee kicks Billy back into the water where he is devoured by a bull shark, which gives Ron an opportunity to enter the flooded basement and look for weapons. Ron brings back a case of dynamite, and they lure the sharks back inside the house and use the dynamite to blow them up. The three siblings start up the truck and flee the area.

With the flood waters rising, Dakota leaves the house to retrieve a rowboat. Upon reaching it, she sees her house start to collapse while Lisa goes into labor inside. Lisa manages to escape and gives birth in the water. Dakota attempts to rescue Lisa and her newborn baby, but a shark capsizes the rowboat. Dale arrives on his boat and rescues Dakota, Lisa, and her baby from the water by fending off the bull sharks surrounding them while Nellie kills off the last shark. As they sail away from the destroyed Annieville, Dale's colleague Greg discovers that another hurricane is heading towards the east coast.

== Cast ==
- Phoebe Dynevor as Lisa, a pregnant woman who becomes trapped in the town of Annieville after the hurricane hits
- Whitney Peak as Dakota, Dale's niece with agoraphobia
- Djimon Hounsou as Dr. Dale Edwards, a marine researcher
- Matt Nable as Billy Olsen, the siblings' foster father
- Andrew Lees as Joe Sprinkle, a TV reporter
- Alyla Browne as Dee, sister of a trio of foster siblings
- Stacy Clausen as Ron, older brother of Dee and Will
- Dante Ubaldi as Will, younger brother of Ron and Dee
- Sami Afuni as Doug, Joe's camera guy
- Tyler Coppin as Trent
- Adam Dunn as Greg Wilson, a harbormaster
- Chai Hansen as Brian
- Annabel Mullion as Claire Fields
- Bert La Bonté as Jimmy
- Sian Luxford as Diane Rialto
- Amy Mathews as Rachel Olsen, Billy's wife
- Josh McConville as Bob

== Production ==
I now just call it "the shark movie" with everyone in my life because it's gone through so many titles. It was Shiver before Thrash. Then it was Beneath the Storm before Shiver, and before Beneath the Storm, the original title was The Rising. It's been through a lot of versions.

— Phoebe Dynevor, on the title changes.

In May 2024, Sony Pictures was announced to be developing a survival thriller film titled Beneath the Storm with Tommy Wirkola writing and directing, and Phoebe Dynevor cast in the lead role. That July, principal photography began in Melbourne, Australia, with Whitney Peak and Djimon Hounsou joining the cast. Matthew Weston served as the cinematographer.

In March 2025, the film was renamed to Shiver. In January 2026, the film was yet-again untitled, and the rights to the film were transferred to Netflix.

== Release ==
Thrash was released by Netflix on April 10, 2026. It was previously set to be theatrically released by Sony Pictures Releasing in the United States on August 1, 2025, and on July 3, 2026.

== Reception ==
Metacritic review
breakdown (unweighted)

Positive
3 (21%)
Mixed
9 (64%)
Negative
2 (14%)

On the review aggregator website Rotten Tomatoes, 45% of 65 critics' reviews are positive, with an average rating of 4.8/10. The website's consensus reads: "Treading water between gnarly kills, Thrash dishes some old-fashioned jolts but would've had more bite if its human characters were more compelling chum." Metacritic, which uses a weighted average, assigned the film a score of 48 out of 100, based on 14 critics, indicating "mixed or average" reviews.

== See also ==
- Crawl (2019 film), wherein the protagonists are preyed upon by alligators during a Category 5 hurricane in Florida
