= Brian Wilson: Long Promised Road =

Documentary film about Brian Wilson

- Tribeca Film Festival poster
- Directed by: Brent Wilson
- Produced by: Tim Headington; Theresa Steele Page; Brent Wilson; Jean Sievers
- Starring: Brian Wilson
- Production company: Ley Line Entertainment
- Distributed by: Screen Media (United States); Universal Pictures (International)
- Release date: June 15, 2021 (Tribeca Film Festival)
- Running time: 95 minutes

Brian Wilson: Long Promised Road is a 2021 documentary film about the Beach Boys' co-founder Brian Wilson directed by Brent Wilson (no relation). It follows Brian and Rolling Stone editor Jason Fine as they drive around Los Angeles and visit locations from Brian's past, interspersed with footage from recording sessions and comments from musical artists about his influence on the industry. The title comes from "Long Promised Road", a song written by Brian's brother Carl Wilson and former band manager Jack Rieley, which figures heavily in the film.

The film was accompanied by the release of a soundtrack album consisting of previously unreleased recordings by Wilson, several of which dated from his unfinished 1990s collaborations with producer Andy Paley, and one new song, "Right Where I Belong", that Wilson co-wrote with My Morning Jacket frontman Jim James for the film.

Long Promised Road received generally favorable reviews. Critics appreciated the camaraderie between Fine and Wilson; however, Wilson's comments were believed to be as superficial and non-revelatory as his usual latter-day interviews.

== Background and content ==
The project was originally conceived as a documentary in which Brent interviewed Brian in a relatively structured interview style typical of documentaries; however, this approach failed, as Brian was unable to open up in this format, and these interviews produced no usable footage. It was then suggested that the interviews be conducted by Rolling Stone editor Jason Fine, who had interviewed and written extensively about Wilson since the 1990s. One of Fine's articles about Wilson from 2015 had been written from discussions the two had while driving around Los Angeles together. A similar format was adopted for the film, with over 70 hours of footage shot across three weekends. In the film, Wilson is still very taciturn and prone to one-word answers, but the casual interview format allowed Wilson to open up more and guide the conversation.

Long Promised Road also features interspersed excerpts of interviews with industry figures including Bruce Springsteen, Elton John, Jim James, Nick Jonas, Taylor Hawkins, Linda Perry, Steven Page and Jakob Dylan, along with one of Wilson's Beach Boys bandmates, Al Jardine. Brent commented, "I wanted just a few people, a very select group of people, and I wanted a diverse group of people. The idea being that if you're watching the film ... and you go, 'What in the world do these people have in common?' And the only thing they could ever have in common is their love for Brian Wilson." Archival footage, such as home movies provided by the Wilson family, are also included in the film. Brent's first cut of the film lasted two and a half hours, which was ultimately reduced to 95 minutes.

After an interviewer suggested that the film possibly bordered on the exploitative, Fine responded, "All of it is done on Brian's terms and on Brian's comfort level". According to Brent, "Jason's success was that he had never forced Brian to talk, you know, it wasn't like, 'OK, you've got your 20-minute interview, you've got to get in and get out, you've got to ask your questions'. Brian was always, I think, lovingly patient with us". Wilson's publicist Jean Sievers is credited as the film's co-producer, while Wilson, his wife Melinda, and Fine are credited as the film's executive producers.

== Release ==
News about the upcoming release of the still-untitled documentary was announced in December 2018, when the film was in post-production. Long Promised Road had been set to premiere at the 2020 Tribeca Film Festival, however, the festival was cancelled due to the COVID-19 pandemic. It premiered a year later at the Tribeca Film Festival in June 2021 and was distributed by Screen Media in theaters and on streaming services that November.

== Reception ==
On review aggregator website Rotten Tomatoes, Long Promised Road holds an approval rating of 92% based on 12 reviews. Metacritic, which uses a weighted average, assigned the film a score of 78 out of 100 based on 6 critics, indicating "generally favorable" reviews.

Reviewing the film for The Arts Fuse, Jason M. Rubin concluded that the clearest takeaway was that "every single day — practically every single hour — is a struggle for Brian Wilson." Acknowledging Wilson's reputation as "a notoriously bad interview", the writer goes on to say that the film succeeds due to the friendship between Fine and Wilson running deeper than "some fake industry connection ... As a result, Wilson opens up to him in a way he does with few others."

In the assessment of Variety's Owen Gleiberman, "Jason Fine is the easygoing friend who inquires about stuff, fields Brian's one-sentence answers, never pushes too hard, absorbs Brian's thoughts and feelings with sympathetic understanding, and talks music with him. He brings Brian out — at least as much as one can." The Playlist's Christian Gallichio wrote that it "may not reveal much about Wilson that isn't covered in a Wikipedia article", and does not include insights from Wilson about his "life after his overdoses. While these aspects are understandably glossed over by Wilson, the film is a bit too apt to let Wilson guide the discussions."

National Review's Kyle Smith found Long Promised Road to be inferior to previous films about Wilson – namely, the "almost definitive" I Just Wasn't Made for These Times and the Love & Mercy biopic. He bemoaned the choice of interviewees (particularly the inclusion of Nick Jonas and the omission of Wilson's family members) as well as the lack of "anything fresh to offer longtime fans", although "it does give a sense of what it might be like to hang out with Wilson today. That sense is largely... frustration." Smith added that the film would have benefited from delving further into "Wilson's crazy asides", such as his remark about the Doobie Brothers' song "What a Fool Believes" scaring "the hell" out of him, or his answer for why he was close with his brother Dennis ("Because we snorted cocaine together!").

== Soundtrack ==
Brian Wilson: Long Promised Road (Original Motion Picture Soundtrack)

Soundtrack album by Brian Wilson
- Released: November 26, 2021
- Recorded: 1987–2008, 2013, 2021
- Length: 39:08
- Label: Lakeshore
- Producers: Brian Wilson; Andy Paley; Jim James

Brian Wilson chronology
At My Piano (2021)	Brian Wilson: Long Promised Road (Original Motion Picture Soundtrack) (2021)	On Tour; 1999–2007 (2026)

In August 2021, Brent stated that there were tentative plans to release a soundtrack album containing never-before-released material. The soundtrack was officially announced on November 23, released by Lakeshore Records on November 26, and is Wilson's twelfth and final studio album.

Long Promised Road features a new song by Wilson and My Morning Jacket frontman Jim James, "Right Where I Belong", which served as Wilson's final newly-recorded track before his death on June 11, 2025. His writing contributions were limited to the song's rough melodic ideas; James structured the song, added lyrics, and recorded the track largely by himself. Brent stated that he had asked James to finish the tune, although Fine claimed that Brian himself solicited the collaboration. Brian recorded his vocal parts after recovering from back surgery. "I'm Goin' Home", "It's Not Easy Being Me", "Must Be a Miracle", "Slightly American Music", and "I'm Broke" were recorded during Brian Wilson's sessions with collaborator Andy Paley. The live version of "In My Room" also features Al Jardine, who toured with Wilson from 2013 (after the collapse of the Beach Boys' reunion in September 2012) until Wilson's retirement from touring in 2022. "Long Promised Road" also features Blondie Chaplin on vocals and lead guitar.

Brian Wilson: Long Promised Road (Original Motion Picture Soundtrack)
No.	Title	Writer(s)	Length
1.	"Right Where I Belong"	Brian Wilson; Jim James	3:59
2.	"I'm Goin Home"	B. Wilson; Andy Paley	3:45
3.	"It's Not Easy Being Me"	B. Wilson; Paley	4:32
4.	"Must Be a Miracle"	B. Wilson; Paley	3:21
5.	"Slightly American Music"	B. Wilson; Paley	3:30
6.	"It's O.K."	B. Wilson; Mike Love	2:23
7.	"Rock & Roll Has Got a Hold on Me"	B. Wilson	3:50
8.	"The Night Was So Young"	B. Wilson	2:08
9.	"Honeycomb"	Bob Merrill	1:55
10.	"Long Promised Road"	Carl Wilson; Jack Rieley	4:34
11.	"In My Room" (live from the Ryman Auditorium)	B. Wilson; Gary Usher	2:21
12.	"I'm Broke"	B. Wilson; Paley	2:45
Total length:			39:08

=== Personnel ===
Partial credits from David Beard of Endless Summer Quarterly Magazine.

- Brian Wilson - lead vocals, producer
- Al Jardine - vocals on "In My Room"
- Blondie Chaplin - vocals and lead guitar on "Long Promised Road"
- Jim James - lead vocals on "Right Where I Belong" and "Long Promised Road"; production ("Right Where I Belong")
- Darian Sahanaja - harmony and backing vocals, keyboards
- Nick Walusko - harmony and backing vocals, guitar
- Probyn Gregory - harmony and backing vocals, bass, guitar
- Rob Bonfiglio - harmony and backing vocals, bass, guitar
- Gary Griffin - harmony and backing vocals, keyboards
- Mike D'Amico - drums
- Jim Laspesa - harmony and backing vocals, percussion
- Paul von Mertens - saxophones, flute, clarinet
