= Doubt (soundtrack) =

Doubt (Original Score)

Film score by Howard Shore
- Released: February 24, 2009
- Recorded: 2008
- Studio: Eastwood Scoring Stage, Warner Bros. Studios, Burbank, California; Legacy Recording Studios, New York City
- Genre: Film score
- Length: 33:39
- Label: Howe Records
- Producer: Howard Shore

Howard Shore chronology
The Betrayal – Nerakhoon (2008)	Doubt (2009)	Edge of Darkness (2010)

Doubt (Original Score) is the film score to the 2008 film Doubt directed by John Patrick Shanley, starring Meryl Streep, Philip Seymour Hoffman, Amy Adams, and Viola Davis. The score is composed by Howard Shore and was released through Howe Records on February 24, 2009.

== Background ==
Howard Shore had originally seen watched the Tony Award-winning 2004 stage play Doubt: A Parable on Broadway well before he was approached by playwright-director Shanley to discuss a film adaption. Shanley says he was moved by the stage show, and felt as an audience member that he had "a connection with the drama", which benefited him as a composer, calling music "an emotional language" that required an "inner driving force" in order to create.

The score was performed by a 17-piece orchestra – featuring instruments that includes the hammered and Appalachian dulcimers, harmonium, recorder, Celtic harp, mandolin, and Irish bouzouki – and was recorded at the Warner Bros. Eastwood Scoring Stage and Legacy Recording Studios.

== Track listing ==
No.	Title	Length
1.	"Main Title"	1:54
2.	"Sacristy"	1:49
3.	"Daybreak"	1:52
4.	"Be Alert"	1:32
5.	"I Am Concerned"	1:23
6.	"The Locker"	1:34
7.	"The Rose Garden"	1:40
8.	"Porch"	1:39
9.	"The Storm"	1:43
10.	"Sister James"	1:26
11.	"Accused"	2:04
12.	"Feathers"	1:51
13.	"The Crow"	2:00
14.	"Donald"	1:43
15.	"Rage"	2:00
16.	"Mrs. Miller"	1:34
17.	"Confrontation"	1:36
18.	"Goodbye Sermon"	2:37
19.	"Doubts"	1:42
Total length:		33:39

== Reception ==
Jonathan Broxton of Movie Music UK wrote that Doubt was more characteristic of his earlier work, rather than the "thematic strength or choral glory that dominated" his Lord of the Rings scores, saying "it's pleasing to see that he has not abandoned that early sound altogether". Adrian Edwards of Gramophone wrote "the music carries an aura which isn't inappropriate for the subject." Todd McCarthy of Variety wrote "Howard Shore's score provides unobtrusive strength". Brent Simon of Screen International called the score "fantastic", and Manohla Dargis of The New York Times called it "melancholic".

June Shin of The Swarthmore Phoenix wrote "the chilling, high-pitched strings composed by Howard Shore and the queasy shades of green as background wall paint of school and church scenes, and you have a culmination of visual and auditory elements converging to subconsciously supplant an extra layer of discomfort to the viewing experience." Richard Propes of The Independent Critic wrote "[Shore]'s original score nicely accents the building crisis between the key players".

== Personnel ==
Credits adapted from liner notes:

- Music composer, producer, orchestrator and conductor – Howard Shore
- Assistant engineer – Angie Teo, Tom Hardisty
- Programming – Greg Laporta, James Sizemore
- Recording and mixing – Simon Rhodes
- Mastering – Jonathan Schultz
- Score editor – Jennifer Dunnington
- Assistant score editor – Ben Pedersen
- Production manager – Elizabeth Cotnoir
- Contractor – Gina Zimmitti, Sandy Park
- Music coordinator – Alan Frey
- Copyist – Sue Sinclair
- Art direction – 3&Co.
- Photography – Alexander Mirsch

Instruments

- Accordion, musette – Charles Giordano, Frank Morocco, Nick Arriondo
- Bass – Jacqui Danilow, Judy Sugarman, Satoshi Okamoto
- Cello – Bruce Wang, Cecilia Tsan, Dennis Karmazyn, Erika Duke-Kirkpatrick, Jeanne LeBlanc, Maureen McDermott, Mina Smith, Roger Lebow, Sophie Shao, Steve Erdody, Tim Landauer, Trevor Handy
- Clarinet – Dean LeBlanc, Steve Williamson, Stuart Clark
- Flute – Heather Clark, Helen Campo
- Guitar – George Doering, John Benthal, John Goux, Larry Saltzman
- Hammered dulcimer – Dan Joseph
- Harp – Katie Kirkpatrick, Victoria Drake
- Piano – Bill Mays, Randy Kerber
- Viola – Brian Dembow, Dave Walther, Desiree Elsevier, Jessica Thompson, Larry Dutton, Lily Francis, Matt Funes, Michael Roth, Natalia Lipkina, Robert Rinehart, Shawn Mann, Vickie Miskolczy, Vivek Kamath
- Violin – Annaliesa Place, Bruce Dukov, Erin Keefe, Jeanine Wynton, Jennifer Kim, Jessica Lee, John Zhang, Jooyoung Oh, Julie Gigante, Karen Karlsrud, Katia Popov, Kuan Cheng Lu, Liz Lim, Matt Lehmann, Ming Hsin, Minyoung Chang, Misa Iwama, Nate Robinson, Peter Bhang, Phillip Levy, Rob Shaw, Roger Wilkie, Sandra Park, Shan Jiang, Sharon Yamada, Suzanne Ornstein, Susan Perelman, Tammy Hatwan, Tom Carney, Vivienne Kim
- Vocals – Diane Freiman Reynolds, Elissa Johnston, Melissa Mackay, Sally Stevens
- Woodwind – Chris Bleth, Dave Weiss
