= Brent Wilson (filmmaker) =

American documentary film director, writer and producer

- Born: U.S.
- Occupations: Director; Writer; Producer
- Years active: 2003 – present
- Spouse: Mayerling Wilson

Brent Wilson is an American documentary film director, writer and producer. He is best known for his work on the documentary films Streetlight Harmonies and Brian Wilson: Long Promised Road.

== Career ==
Wilson directed his debut feature documentary, The Last Reunion: A Gathering of Heroes, which premiered at the Palm Beach International Film Festival and won best documentary in 2003. In 2020, he directed the documentary Streetlight Harmonies, which premiered at Doc NYC. In 2020, he directed the documentary Brian Wilson: Long Promised Road, about the Beach Boys' co-founder Brian Wilson, which premiered at the Tribeca Film Festival.

== Selected filmography ==
Year	Film	Contribution	Note
2021	Brian Wilson: Long Promised Road	Director, writer and producer	Documentary
2020	Streetlight Harmonies	Director, writer and producer	Documentary
2017	Scouting Camp: Next Olympic Hopeful	Director	Documentary
2014	24 Hours of Reality: 24 Reason for Hope	Supervising producer	TV special
2013	24 Hours of Reality: The Cost of Carbon	Supervising producer	TV special
2011	American Idol	Producer	6 episodes
2010	2010 FIFA World Cup Kick-Off Celebration Concert	Writer and supervising producer	TV special
2010	Dow Live Earth Run for Water	Writer and supervising producer	TV special
2009	So You Think You Can Dance	Producer	18 episodes
2009	House of Jazmin	Producer	4 episodes
2005	Chris Isaak's Guide to Jazz Fest	Director, writer and producer	TV special
2004	NSYNC'S Challenge for the Children	Director and producer	Music video
2003	The Last Reunion: A Gathering of Heroes	Director, writer and producer	Documentary

== Awards and nominations ==
Year	Result	Award	Category	Work	Ref.
2021	Won	Nashville Film Festival	Best Music Documentary Feature	Brian Wilson: Long Promised Road	
2021	Nominated	Hollywood Music in Media Awards	Best Music Documentary	Brian Wilson: Long Promised Road	
