= Eye for an Eye (2025 film) =

2025 American horror film

- Theatrical release poster
- Directed by: Colin Tilley
- Screenplay by: Elisa Victoria; Michael Tully
- Produced by: Tim Headington; Theresa Steele Page; Rachael Fung; Nate Kamiya
- Starring: Whitney Peak; S. Epatha Merkerson; Golda Rosheuvel; Finn Bennett; Laken Giles
- Cinematography: Robert Leitzell
- Edited by: James Vandewater
- Music by: Timothy Williams
- Production companies: Ley Line Entertainment; glassEyeballs
- Distributed by: Vertical
- Release date: June 20, 2025
- Running time: 101 minutes
- Country: United States
- Language: English

Eye for an Eye is a 2025 American horror film directed by Colin Tilley from a screenplay by Elisa Victoria and Michael Tully, and based on the book Mr. Sandman by Elisa Victoria. It stars Whitney Peak, S. Epatha Merkerson, Golda Rosheuvel, Finn Bennett and Laken Giles. The movie follows Anna, a teen who moves to Florida to stay with her grandmother following her parents' death and becomes haunted by a mysterious being after being a silent witness to an act of violence.

Eye for an Eye was released on June 20, 2025, by Vertical. The film received positive reviews from critics.

== Plot ==
A young woman dreams about dancing on a stage with her cheerleading squad. At the end of the number, she falls through the stage floor and is horribly injured. She wakes up screaming, with her eye sockets bloody and her eyes gone.

In the present day, Anna arrives at the Florida house of May, her blind grandmother, following her parents' death. She meets May's sister Patti, and encounters two teenagers named Shawn and Julie while exploring the woods behind the house. She drinks beer with them and goes home, discovering a large, old tree, on which her grandmother's name has been carved.

Patti tells Anna her grandmother had been a talented but malicious cheerleader, gleefully explaining that May lost her eyes to 'Sandman', a legendary figure that punishes evildoers after haunting their dreams. Anna goes to drink beer with Shawn and Julie, and Shawn bullies a child named Conner before pushing him off a bridge, breaking his arm. Shawn takes him to the hospital, but threatens to hurt him if he tells anyone what happened. Feeling guilty, Anna escorts him to the door then goes home, where she cries herself to sleep. Conner visits Patti, who urges him to stand up for himself. When he tells her that he is powerless, she advises him to write his bullies' name in the old tree so Sandman will punish them. That night, Conner carves Shawn, Julie and Anna's names into the tree.

Anna starts having nightmares in which she relives her parents' death and sees herself drowning in a casket. The next day, she sees Conner in a local shop. She apologizes to him and buys him roller blades, but he refuses to speak to her. As the days go by, Shawn, Julie and Anna are all tormented by nightmares. Anna visits the tree and discovers the names carved into the bark, understanding what is happening to them. That night, she attempts to cut down the tree, but loses consciousness. In the following dream, she hears the story of Vincent, a blind boy with glass eyes that was killed by bullies in the forest, leading to him becoming Sandman.

Anna has an altercation with Shawn, then shows him and Julie the tree. After the girls leave him behind, Shawn's eyes are torn out by Sandman, a skeletal, eyeless being covered in roots. While Shawn tries to escape, he runs into a branch, falls and seemingly dies. Anna and Julie attempt to lucid dream, but have another nightmare. The next morning, Julie falls asleep in the bathtub, where Sandman tears out one of her eyes. As she tries to escape him, she trips, hits her head and drowns in the bathtub.

Anna is drugged and tied to her bed by her grandmother. May tries to cut her eyes out with scissors, believing that she needs to take her eyes in order to get her own back. Anna manages to escape, and plants the scissors in her grandmother's eye socket in the struggle that ensues. Having now realized that Sandman wants 'an eye for an eye', Anna breaks her arm with a hammer, inflicting the same injury as Conner on herself. While she falls asleep, Patti arrives at the house and discovers May, who removes the scissors from her eye then falls down the stairs. When Patti goes to check on her, May tells her she knows that she had inflicted this pain on her, and stabs Patti in the eye. Both sisters lose consciousness.

Dreaming, Anna finds two glass eyes on the floor. In Sandman's lair, she hands them over to him and he spares her. She wakes up in her bed, her eyes intact.

== Cast ==
- Whitney Peak as Anna Reeves
- S. Epatha Merkerson as May Roberts
- Golda Rosheuvel as Patti
- Finn Bennett as Shawn Heard
- Laken Giles as Julie Cross
- Michika McClinton as Young May

== Production ==
In July 2023, it was announced Whitney Peak, S. Epatha Merkerson, Golda Rosheuvel, Finn Bennett and Laken Giles had joined the cast of the film, then titled Somewhere in Dreamland with Colin Tilley directing from a screenplay by Elisa Victoria and Michael Tully, and Ley Line Entertainment producing and financing. In October 2024, it was announced the film had been re-titled Eye for an Eye.

== Release ==
In May 2025, Vertical acquired distribution rights to the film. It received a limited theatrical release on June 20, 2025. The film was released digitally on Starz in the United States, and on HBO Max in Latin and South America. Following its release, it became the most streamed movie in 21 countries on HBO Max.

== Reception ==
=== Critical reception ===
On the review aggregator website Rotten Tomatoes, 85% of 13 critics' reviews are positive.

On San Jose Mercury News, Randy Myers rated it 3.5/4, writing that "even if the taut screenplay somewhat disappoints in the finale, Tilley keeps the visual aspects first-rate and never loses sight of what he has set out to accomplish." Luna Guthrie wrote for Collider that the movie was "a truly immersive experience that makes the best use of every element of filmmaking", calling it "a wonderfully atmospheric horror movie."

=== Accolades ===
Award / Festival	Date of ceremony	Category	Recipient(s)	Result	Ref.
Sitges Film Festival	19 October 2025	Best Feature Film	Eye for an Eye	Nominated	

== See also ==
- List of horror films of 2025
