= Streetlight Harmonies =

2020 documentary film by Brent Wilson

- Film poster
- Directed by: Brent Wilson
- Screenplay by: George Bellias; Brent Wilson
- Produced by: Timothy Headington; Theresa Steele Page; Nate Kamiya; Brent Wilson; Dan Braun
- Starring: Charlie Thomas; Jay and the Americans; Arthur C. Brooks; Lance Bass; Jeff Barry; Jon Bauman
- Cinematography: Adam Williams
- Edited by: George Bellias
- Music by: Gabe Lopez; Trevor Page
- Release date: November 2017 (Doc NYC)
- Running time: 83 minutes
- Country: United States
- Language: English

Streetlight Harmonies is a 2017 documentary film directed by Brent Wilson. It had its world premiere at the 2017 DOC NYC Film Festival. It was released digitally through Gravitas Ventures and home video on March 31, 2020.

== Plot ==
The film tells the stories of the birth and evolution of Doo-Wop music.

== Cast ==
- Charlie Thomas as himself
- Anthony Gourdine as himself
- Jerry Blavat as himself
- Jay and the Americans as Themselves
- Arthur C. Brooks as himself
- Brian McKnight as himself
- Fred Parris as himself
- Brian Wilson as himself
- Lance Bass as himself
- Jeff Barry as himself
- Vito Picone as himself
- Dolores "LaLa" Brooks as herself
- Jon Bauman as himself
- Terry Ellis as himself
- Al Jardine as himself

== Reception ==
=== Critical response ===
On Rotten Tomatoes, the documentary holds an approval rating of 100% based on 9 reviews, with an average rating of 7.8/10.
