= Miami Vice '85 =

Upcoming film by Joseph Kosinski

- Directed by: Joseph Kosinski
- Written by: Dan Gilroy; Eric Warren Singer
- Based on: Miami Vice by Anthony Yerkovich
- Produced by: Dylan Clark; Joseph Kosinski
- Starring: Michael B. Jordan; Austin Butler
- Cinematography: Claudio Miranda
- Production companies: Dylan Clark Productions; Monolith Pictures
- Distributed by: Universal Pictures
- Release date: May 19, 2028
- Country: United States
- Language: English

Miami Vice '85 is an upcoming American action thriller film directed by Joseph Kosinski, from a screenplay by Dan Gilroy and Eric Warren Singer, based on the television series created by Anthony Yerkovich. The film stars Michael B. Jordan and Austin Butler in the lead roles as Ricardo Tubbs and Sonny Crockett, with Alden Ehrenreich, Whitney Peak, Camila Morrone, Danny Ramirez, John Leguizamo, Andrew Schulz, Edi Gathegi, Walton Goggins, André Holland, Michael Irby, Dominic Sessa, and Haley Lu Richardson in supporting roles.

Miami Vice '85 is scheduled to be released in the United States by Universal Pictures on May 19, 2028.

== Cast ==
- Michael B. Jordan as Ricardo Tubbs
- Austin Butler as Sonny Crockett
- Alden Ehrenreich
- Whitney Peak
- Camila Morrone
- Danny Ramirez
- John Leguizamo as Calderone
- Andrew Schulz
- Edi Gathegi
- Walton Goggins
- André Holland
- Michael Irby as Lou Rodriguez
- Dominic Sessa as Eddie
- Haley Lu Richardson

== Production ==
In April 2025, it was announced that a new film version of the Miami Vice television series, first adapted for film in 2006 by Michael Mann, was in development at Universal Pictures. Joseph Kosinski was set to direct, with Dan Gilroy writing the screenplay. In September, it was announced that Eric Singer would write the screenplay as well. Michael B. Jordan and Austin Butler entered negotiations the following month to portray Ricardo Tubbs and Sonny Crockett, respectively. Glen Powell was also considered for the role of Crockett. In April 2026, Jordan and Butler were confirmed for their roles, with the film being retitled to Miami Vice '85. In August, Alden Ehrenreich, Whitney Peak, Camila Morrone, and Danny Ramirez joined the cast in undisclosed roles. John Leguizamo, Andrew Schulz, and Edi Gathegi were cast the following month, with Leguizamo portraying the film's antagonist. Walton Goggins, André Holland, Michael Irby and Haley Lu Richardson joined the cast in October.

Filming began in October 2026 in Wayne, New Jersey. Filming in Brooklyn was interrupted when a man with a butcher knife began running across the set and threatening production staff. Production is also due to occur in New York City and Miami. The film is being shot with IMAX cameras.

== Release ==
Miami Vice '85 is scheduled to be released in the United States on May 19, 2028, by Universal Pictures. It was initially due to release on August 6, 2027.
