= Grow (film) =

British comedy film

- Directed by: John McPhail
- Screenplay by: Nick Guthe; Christos N. Gage; Ruth Fletcher Gage
- Starring: Golda Rosheuvel; Priya-Rose Brookwell; Nick Frost; Joe Wilkinson; Tim McInnerny; Jane Horrocks
- Production companies: Double Nickel Entertainment; Sky Studios; Orogen Entertainment
- Distributed by: Sky Cinema; Pumpkin Films
- Release date: 16 August 2025
- Running time: 107 minutes
- Country: United Kingdom
- Language: English

Grow is a 2025 British family comedy film starring Nick Frost, Golda Rosheuvel, Priya-Rose Brookwell, Dominic McLaughlin, and Jeremy Swift. It tells the story of Dinah, a farmer whose niece, Charlie, can telepathically connect with plants and make them grow to immense proportions.

== Cast ==
- Golda Rosheuvel as Dinah
- Priya-Rose Brookwell as Charlie
- Nick Frost as Arlo
- Joe Wilkinson as Boris Mudd
- Tim McInnerny as Lord Smythe-Gherkin
- Jane Horrocks as Lady Smythe-Gherkin
- Kathryn Drysdale as Charlie's mother
- Fisayo Akinade as Kevin
- Sharon Rooney as Sharon
- Jeremy Swift as Mr Gregory
- Alan Carr as MC
- Dominic McLaughlin as Oliver Gregory

== Production ==
The film is directed by John McPhail and produced by Double Nickel Entertainment in association with Sky Studios and Orogen Entertainment. The film is written by Nick Guthe, Christos N. Gage, and Ruth Fletcher Gage. Principal photography took place in Scotland in 2024.

The ensemble cast includes Golda Rosheuvel, Nick Frost, Jeremy Swift, Tim McInnerny and Jane Horrocks, and also features Priya-Rose Brookwell, Joe Wilkinson, Kathryn Drysdale, Fisayo Akinade, Sharon Rooney and Alan Carr.

== Release ==
Grow premiered at the Edinburgh International Film Festival in Scotland on August 16, 2025.

The film was later screened at the Montreal International Film Festival in Canada, which took place from August 22 to 24, 2025 and where it won the Best Cast Award.

It was also screened at the Canada International Children's Film Festival on August 23–24, 2025, where it won the Best Feature Film Award.

The film further screened at IFF Young Horizon, Dinard Festival of British & Irish Film, FilmColumbia Festival, Cambridge Film Festival, Into Film Festival, British Film Festival Australia, POFF Just Film, Ale Kino! Festival, and the Gijon Film Festival.

The film was set to be released theatrically in the United States on October 3, 2025. Following the announcement of the release of Taylor Swift's The Official Release Party of a Showgirl on the same day, Grow moved its release date to October 17.

Grow made the 2026 BAFTA Awards Longlist in the Children's & Family Film category and was nominated for a BAFTA Scotland award in the Feature Film category.

On September 9th, 2026, the writers of Grow won a Humanitas Prize in the category of Family Feature.

== Accolades ==
Year	Award/Festival	Category	Recipient	Result
2025	Montreal International Film Festival	Best Cast	Cast	Won
2025	Calgary International Film Festival	Audience Choice Award Contemporary World Cinema	Film	Won
2025	Canada International Children's Film Festival	Best Feature Film	Film	Won
2025	Canada International Children's Film Festival	Most Entertaining Film	Film	Nominated
2025	Canada International Children's Film Festival	Children's Jury Award	Film	Nominated
2025	Canada International Children's Film Festival	Parents’ Jury Award	Film	Nominated
2025	Canada International Children's Film Festival	Best Rising Star	Priya-Rose Brookwell	Nominated
2026	Zlin Film Festival	Children's Jury Award for Best Feature Film	Film	Won
2026	Royal Television Awards Scotland	Camera (Craft)	George Cameron Geddes	Won
2026	Humanitas Prize	Family Feature	Nick Guthe, Christos Gage, Ruth Fletcher Gage	Won
2026	BAFTA Scotland	Best Feature Film	Film	Nominated
2026	British Film Designers Guild	Production Design Award for Contemporary Feature	Jamie Morgan Lapsley, Gordon Rogers, Laurel Wear	Nominated
