= Wavelength (company) =

American film production company

- Company type: Private
- Industry: Film industry
- Founded: 2015; 11 years ago
- Founder: Jenifer Westphal
- Headquarters: New York, New York, U.S.
- Area served: United States
- Website: wavelengthproductions.com

Wavelength is an American independent film production company founded in 2015, by Jenifer Westphal. The company has produced Won't You Be My Neighbor? (2018), Selah and the Spades (2019), Farewell Amor (2020), Athlete A (2020), 32 Sounds (2022), and On Swift Horses (2024).

== History ==
In 2015, Jenifer Westphal launched the company focusing on developing, financing, and producing films. Joe Plummer later joined the company and was promoted to president.

Wavelength additionally produces branded content for various companies including Uber Eats, Under Armour, Nike, Adidas, Pepsi and more. Wavelength offers the WAVE (Woman at the Very Edge) grant supporting women and non-binary filmmakers in production of their first short film.

In November 2023, Wavelength signed a first-look deal with Macaroni Art Productions.
