= Whitney Peak (actress) =

Ugandan and Canadian actress (born 2003)

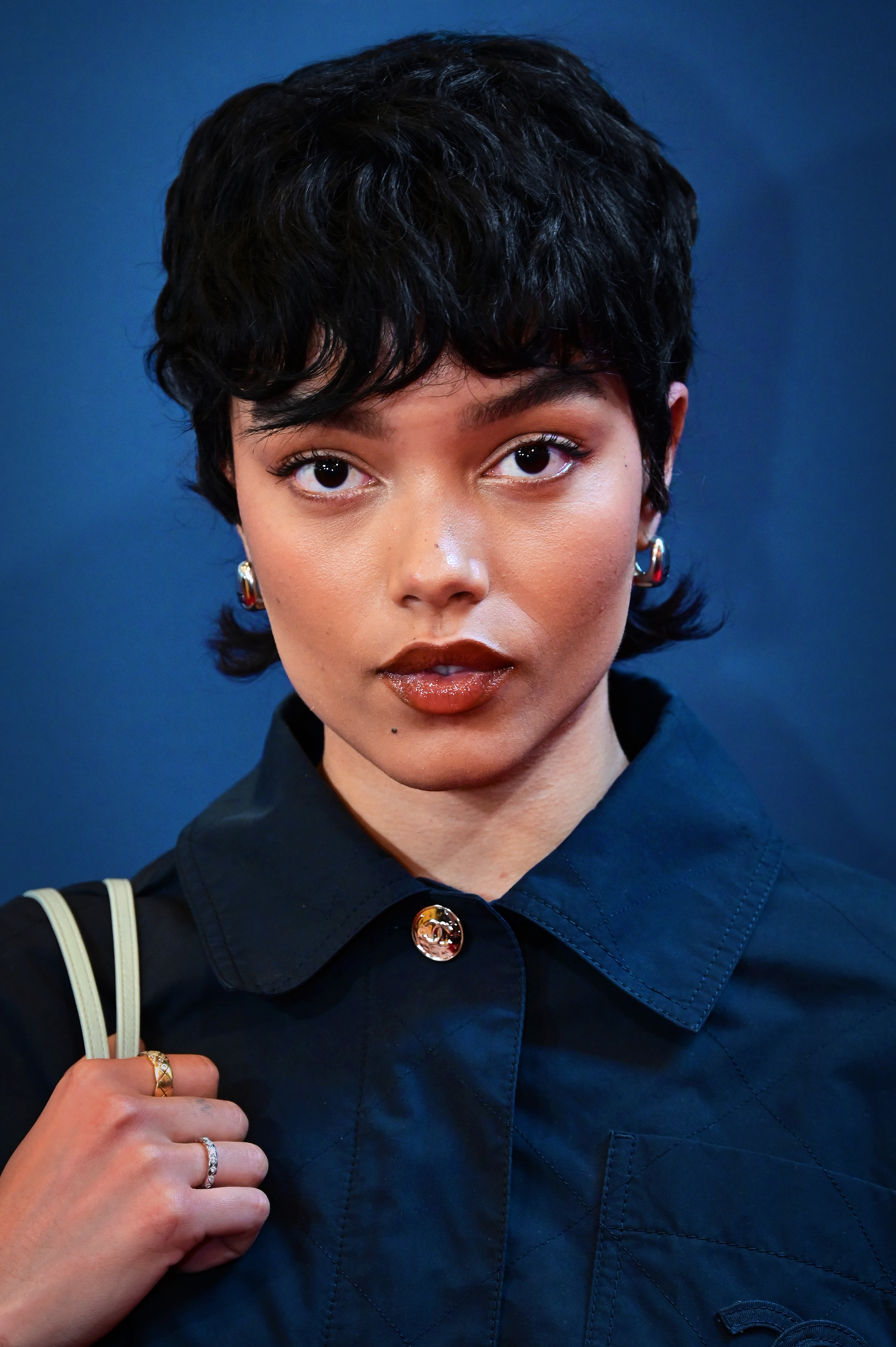
- Peak in 2026
- Born: 28 January 2003 (age 23); Kampala, Uganda
- Occupations: Actress; model
- Years active: 2017−present

Whitney Peak (born 28 January 2003) is a Ugandan and Canadian actress. She starred in the HBO Max revival of Gossip Girl (2021–2023) and as Lenore Dove Baird in The Hunger Games: Sunrise on the Reaping. Her other work includes the Apple TV+ series Home Before Dark (2020), the Netflix series Chilling Adventures of Sabrina (2019–2020) and the Disney+ film Hocus Pocus 2 (2022). She is set to play Joni J in 4 Kids Walk Into a Bank (2027).

== Life and education ==
Born in Kampala, Uganda, in 2003, Peak is the youngest daughter of a Ugandan hairdresser and stepdaughter of a Canadian aircraft engineer. Her family is Muslim. She attended boarding school at Hillside Primary School (Naalya), and was a competitive swimmer. Her family relocated to Canada in 2012, settling in Port Coquitlam, British Columbia where Peak switched to a public school, including Terry Fox Secondary. As of 2026, she is in a relationship with director Lucas Ansel.

== Career ==
=== Molly's Game and first roles ===
After moving to Canada, Peak received the chance to audition for a project before realizing that it was a scam. She was, however, able to find an agent and land bit parts in the TV movie Campfire Kiss and the film Molly's Game. She also featured in the TV shows Legends of Tomorrow, Chilling Adventures of Sabrina, iZombie, and Home Before Dark.

=== Gossip Girl and breakthrough ===
In 2019, Peak submitted an audition for the role of Zoya Lott in the Gossip Girl reboot. The directors were so taken with her audition that she immediately got the part, marking her first leading role. The show ran from 2021 to 2023 and was cancelled after two seasons. In 2022, she starred as Becca in Hocus Pocus 2, a sequel to Kenny Ortega's Halloween film. After featuring on the podcast Big Envelopes and the short film Wait, Your Car?, Peak returned to the screen in 2025 as Anna Reeves in Eye For An Eye and Yvonne Reynolds in Trap House. In 2026, she starred as Dakota Edwards in Netflix's thriller Thrash, which aired to mixed reviews. In 2025, she made her stage debut as Esmerelda in Williamstown Theatre Festival's revival of Camino Reel, before portraying Seraphina in Work of Devotion at the Lincoln Center Theater, which is set to transfer to the Second Stage Theater, Off Broadway in 2027. Peak starred as Lenore Dove Baird in The Hunger Games: Sunrise on the Reaping in 2026, also featuring on the soundtrack.

=== Upcoming projects ===
In 2027, the film 4 Kids Walk Into a Bank will release in theaters. She will also star as Grant, a musician, in the biopic Ethel and play undisclosed roles in the films Serendipity and Miami Vice '85 .

== Political views ==
Peak has discussed her privileges as a biracial woman and spoken on the confusion of being perceived as white in Uganda and a person of color in Canada. She has also spoken for the need of greater diversity in entertainment. In an interview with Harper's Bazaar, she said "Race, ethnicity, religion, shape, size, sex—all these shouldn’t matter." and emphasized her belief that people from all backgrounds should have equal opportunity. Peak then spoke out on LGBTQ representation, saying "You don’t announce your sexuality every time you walk into a room, it’s just who you are." In a 2026 interview with Who What Wear, she revealed that she initially turned down her role in the Hunger Games, having been "raised to think that Black women don’t fit in these spaces? I was writing myself off before I even gave myself a chance."

== Endorsements ==
In 2021, Peak was named as a brand ambassador in the United States for the house of Chanel. In 2023, Peak was appointed as the face of Chanel fragrance, making her their first Black ambassador for Coco Mademoiselle ; the TV commercial campaign uses the 1978 song Follow Me by Amanda Lear. In 2026, Peak was named as one of Vogue Magazine's star players.

== Credits ==
=== Film ===
Key
†	Denotes films that have not yet been released

Whitney Peak's film appearances
Year	Title	Role	Notes
2017	Molly's Game	Stella	
2022	Hocus Pocus 2	Becca	
2025	Wait, Your Car?	Beth	Short film
2025	Eye for an Eye	Anna Reeves	
2025	Trap House	Yvonne Reynolds	
2026	Thrash	Dakota Edwards	
2026	The Hunger Games: Sunrise on the Reaping	Lenore Dove Baird	
2027	4 Kids Walk Into a Bank †	Joni J	Completed
2028	Miami Vice '85 †	TBA	Filming
TBA	Serendipity †	TBA	Pre-production
TBA	Ethel †	Grant	Pre-production

=== Television ===
Whitney Peak's television appearances
Year	Title	Role	Notes
2025	Minority Report	Young Vega	
2017	Campfire Kiss	Gillian	Television film
2018	Legends of Tomorrow	Lenise	Episode: "Wet Hot American Bummer"
2019−2020	Chilling Adventures of Sabrina	Judith Blackwood	10 episodes
2019	iZombie	Student	Episode: "Five, Six, Seven, Ate!"
2020	Home Before Dark	Alpha Jessica	
2022	The Wonderful World of Disney	Becca	Episode: Hocus Pocus 2
2021–2023	Gossip Girl	Zoya Lott	Main role

=== Music videos ===
Year	Song title	Artist	Reference
2022	"Nonsense"	Sabrina Carpenter	

=== Commercials ===
Year	Title	Company
2022	Chanel 22	Chanel
2023	Who Are You Coco Mademoiselle?	Chanel

=== Stage ===
Year	Title	Role	Venue
2025	Camino Real	Esmerelda	Williamstown Theatre Festival
2026	Work of Devotion	Seraphina	Lincoln Center Theater

=== Songs ===
Year	Sountrack	Character	Song
2026	The Hunger Games: Sunrise on the Reaping	Lenore Dove Baird	"The Goose and the Common"
2026	The Hunger Games: Sunrise on the Reaping	Lenore Dove Baird	"The Raven I"
2026	The Hunger Games: Sunrise on the Reaping	Lenore Dove Baird	"The Raven II"
2026	The Hunger Games: Sunrise on the Reaping	Lenore Dove Baird	"The Raven III"

=== Podcasts ===
Year	Title	Role
2023	Big Envelopes	Hadley
