= Documentary film techniques =

Conventions for films on factual topics

A documentary film is a film story concerning factual topics (i.e. someone or something). These films have a variety of aims: to record specific events and ideas; to inform viewers; to convey opinions and to create public interest. A number of common techniques or conventions are used in documentaries to achieve these aims.

== Actuality in relation to documentary films ==
Actuality is the term for raw film footage of real life events, places and people as opposed to fictional films which use actors, scripted stories and artificial sets. Documentaries are not pure actuality films - rather they combine actuality with explanation, commentary, and perhaps even dramatization...

== Voice-over ==
The voice-over in a documentary is a commentary by the filmmaker, or added to the soundtrack during the production. Through this the filmmaker can speak directly to the viewer, offering information, explanations and opinions.

== Direct and indirect interviews ==
The interview is a common documentary technique. It allows people being filmed to speak directly about events, prompted by the questions asked by the filmmaker. An interview may take place on screen, or off screen, on a different set. Interviews in a documentary give the viewer a sense of realism, that the documentary maker’s views are mutually shared by another person or source, and thus more valid. To achieve this much detail from what may be a one-hour interview, clips of only a few minutes are shown. Interviews on opposing sides of an issue may be shown to give the viewer comprehensive information about a topic.

Interviews are also a very important technique for character introduction. Lighting, color scheme, framing and camera angle all impact the audience's perception of the person who is speaking. As with narratives, this can lend to a specific feel the director wishes to convey about the person speaking. The impact to the story is key, as the audience will form an opinion of the person based on the initial meeting.

== Archival footage ==
Archival, or stock footage, is material obtained from a film library or archive and inserted into a documentary to show historical events or to add detail without the need for additional filming. This can include still images as well as archival film. The concept of archival footage can be extended to include the photography of historical material from archives which are used to illustrate a documentary film and is also the main reason why archive footage is especially important to historical documentary filmmaking.

== Re-enactment ==
Re-enactments are also often used in documentaries. They are artificial scenes of an event that have been reconstructed and acted out on film based on information of the event. Reconstructions generally provide factual information and give the viewer a sense of realism as if the events are really happening in front of them. They often indicate that the footage is not real by using techniques such as blurring, distortion, lighting effects, changes in camera level, and color enhancement within the footage.

== Montage ==
A montage sequence conveys ideas visually by putting them in a specific order in the film. Narrative montages involve the planning of sequence of shots used to indicate changes in time and place within a film. Ideational montages link actions with words, and are often used in documentaries.

A different positioning of shots conveys different ideas to the viewer. For example, a montage containing a negative theme followed by a positive theme may give the viewer the idea that the positive theme is the main theme of the montage.

Montages in documentaries are usually linked with words that characters say. This visual representation of the characters thoughts helps position the viewer in the story, and helps the viewer better understand what the character is saying. It visually presents a progression of ideas on a screen.

== Exposition ==
In a documentary, the exposition occurs at the beginning and introduces the important themes of the film. It is important because it creates the viewer's first impression and introduces the viewer to the content.

Dramatic segments of the documentary are specially chosen in order to grab the viewer’s attention. These shots are specifically positioned, such that the montage positions us to believe a certain theme presented by the documentary and thus the documentary presents its view much more persuasively to the viewer.
