= Edge of Darkness (2010 soundtrack) =

Edge of Darkness (Original Motion Picture Soundtrack)

Film score by Howard Shore
- Released: January 26, 2010
- Recorded: 2009
- Studios: Abbey Road Studios, London
- Genre: Film score
- Length: 55:03
- Label: WaterTower Music
- Producer: Howard Shore

Howard Shore chronology
| Doubt (2008) | Edge of Darkness (2010) | The Twilight Saga: Eclipse (2010) |

Edge of Darkness (Original Motion Picture Soundtrack) is the film score to the 2010 film Edge of Darkness directed by Martin Campbell and starring Mel Gibson. The film score composed by Howard Shore was released through WaterTower Music on January 26, 2010.

== Background ==
The original score was initially set to be composed by John Corigliano, who was chosen by Campbell as he wanted Gibson to be portrayed in a more introspective and intimate manner, as opposed to his usual pattern and had written a "highly motivic and thematic" work for the film. He also recorded the score at the Abbey Road Studios in London. However, despite his work being completed, his score was not included in the final edit, as producer Graham King sold the rights to Warner Bros. Pictures who had the film to be changed into an action film with Gibson's involvement, and needed a score to suit the actor's image and Corigliano's work did not match the final output and the composer himself rejected the idea on composing for an action star. Since, he went to the Sydney Conservatorium of Music for performing a concert, Corigliano was unable to rescore the film, which led the producers to replace him with Howard Shore. The score was written and recorded at the Abbey Road Studios in a short span of time.

== Track listing ==
| No. | Title | Length |
|---|---|---|
| 1. | "Titles" | 2:18 |
| 2. | "Mourning" | 3:24 |
| 3. | "Beach" | 2:34 |
| 4. | "Knife" | 2:25 |
| 5. | "Burning" | 2:40 |
| 6. | "Diogenes" | 3:35 |
| 7. | "Pursuit" | 3:39 |
| 8. | "Hit & Run" | 1:55 |
| 9. | "Nightflower" | 2:16 |
| 10. | "Senator" | 2:00 |
| 11. | "Emma" | 2:39 |
| 12. | "Captured" | 2:16 |
| 13. | "Killing" | 2:52 |
| 14. | "Reunited" | 2:25 |
| 15. | "Edge Of Darkness" | 2:07 |
| 16. | "You're My Girl" | 2:38 |
| Total length: | | 41:43 |

== Reception ==
James Southall of Movie Wave wrote "This isn't an easy album to sit and listen to, but not everything in life should be easy, and if you find yourself in the right mood then it's certainly one worth having in your collection". Christian Clemmensen of Filmtracks wrote "Edge of Darkness is surprisingly cohesive, but it takes a while to cook."

Reviewer based at The Hollywood Reporter called it an "edgy score". Philip French of The Guardian wrote "Howard Shore's score is a dull, conventional affair compared to the magnificently eerie music written for the original by Eric Clapton and Michael Kamen." JimmyO of JoBlo.com called the score as "fine". Rick DeMott of Animation World Network wrote "Howard Shore's score is a subtle presence throughout the film, acting as a supporting character and never drawing too much attention to itself."

== Music from the Edge ==
Corigliano's rejected score for the film was released as Music from the Edge through Perseverance Records in May 2012.

| No. | Title | Length |
|---|---|---|
| 1. | "His Daughter's Death" | 4:11 |
| 2. | "Reflections" | 5:15 |
| 3. | "Her Home" | 3:23 |
| 4. | "Pursuit" | 3:46 |
| 5. | "Her Friends Death" | 2:33 |
| 6. | "Hideout" | 1:55 |
| 7. | "Family Shave" | 2:31 |
| 8. | "A Sober Story" | 3:01 |
| 9. | "The Escape" | 2:03 |
| 10. | "Revenge" | 3:00 |
| 11. | "Reunification" | 6:34 |
| Total length: | | 38:12 |

== Personnel ==
Credits adapted from liner notes:

- Music composer, producer, orchestrator and conductor – Howard Shore
- Orchestra leader – Thomas Bowes
- Harp – Helen Tunstall
- Piano – Simon Chamberlain
- Orchestra contractor – Isobel Griffiths
- Assistant orchestra contractor – Jo Buckley
- Music direction and programming – James Sizemore
- Recording and mixing – Peter Cobbin
- Mastering – Jonathan Schultz
- Music editor – Jen Monnar, Jonathan Schultz
- Music coordinator – Alan Frey, David Stoner, Pete Compton
- Copyist – Sue Sinclair, Vic Fraser
- Executive producer – Reynold D'Silva
- Music business affairs – Keith Zajic, Lori Blackstone
- Executive in charge of music for Warner Bros. – Darren Higman, Doug Frank
- Executive in charge of music for WaterTower – Jason Linn
- Art direction – Sandeep Sriram
- Photography – Benjamin Ealovega
