= Edge of Darkness (2010 film) =

2010 crime thriller film

- Theatrical release poster
- Directed by: Martin Campbell
- Written by: William Monahan; Andrew Bovell
- Based on: Edge of Darkness; 1985 TV series by Troy Kennedy Martin
- Produced by: Graham King; Timothy Headington; Michael Wearing
- Starring: Mel Gibson; Ray Winstone; Danny Huston; Bojana Novakovic
- Cinematography: Phil Méheux
- Edited by: Stuart Baird
- Music by: Howard Shore
- Production companies: GK Films; BBC Films; Icon Productions
- Distributed by: Warner Bros. Pictures (North and Hispanic America and Spain); Icon Film Distribution (United Kingdom, Ireland, Australia and New Zealand)
- Release date: 29 January 2010 (United States)
- Running time: 117 minutes
- Countries: United Kingdom; United States
- Language: English
- Budget: $80 million
- Box office: $81.1 million

Edge of Darkness is a 2010 crime thriller film directed by Martin Campbell, written by William Monahan and Andrew Bovell, and starring Mel Gibson and Ray Winstone. It is a British-American co-production based on the 1985 BBC television series of the same name, which was also directed by Campbell. The film was Gibson's first screen lead since Signs (2002), and follows a detective investigating the murder of his activist daughter, while uncovering political conspiracies and cover-ups in the process. It was released on 29 January 2010 and received mixed reviews from critics, though Gibson's and Winstone's performances were praised. It grossed $81 million against its $80 million production budget which made it a box-office bomb.

== Plot ==
Boston homicide detective Thomas Craven picks up his daughter Emma, who comes home to visit. Emma feels increasingly unwell, vomiting and suffering a nosebleed. When they leave the house to go to a hospital, a masked gunman shouts "Craven!" and opens fire with a shotgun, killing Emma.

While formally identifying Emma's body, Craven takes a lock of her hair as a memento, then returns to duty. Upon finding Emma's .45 pistol, he starts to suspect that Emma, not he, was the gunman's target. Tracing the gun's ownership leads him to David, her boyfriend. David is fearful of Northmoor, a weapons company that employs him and Emma, and refuses to talk, only giving Craven her apartment key. In the apartment, Craven realises Emma's laptop has been stolen and finds a Geiger counter, he later discovers the lock of hair is radioactive.

Craven visits Jack Bennett, Northmoor's CEO. Northmoor leases a research and development facility from the U.S. government. Bennett claims the firm is working on clean nuclear energy, but refuses to go into detail. The conversation ends with Bennett rudely asking how it feels to lose a daughter.

Craven repeatedly has visions of Emma's past, including short conversations, typically as the happy young child he remembers and loves. As he burns Emma's clothing in his backyard, Craven is confronted by Jedburgh, an English "private consultant". Jedburgh has been tasked with evaluating and tying up loose ends relating to Emma. Craven reveals Emma wasn't able to say anything about Northmoor, Jedburgh fills in Craven on Emma's friends and activities. They discuss philosophy and Jedburgh takes a liking to Craven.

Craven meets one of Emma's activist friends, who reveals that Bennett is a psychopath who ordered Emma's murder, as well as the murders of other activists who broke into Northmoor, aided by Emma. The company has been manufacturing nuclear weapons using foreign designs. The weapons were intended to be linked with foreign nations if they were used by the United States. DVD evidence of this is given to Craven, as the friend leaves she is run over by a Northmoor agent who is then shot dead by Craven.

Craven confronts U.S. Senator Jim Pine, who was contacted earlier by Emma and turned away, revealing that Craven knows almost everything that happened.

After examining Emma's refrigerator with the Geiger counter, Craven discovers that her milk is radioactive. Craven also falls sick. He is abducted by Northmoor agents, and wakes up handcuffed to a gurney in the Northmoor facility, but manages to escape. Suffering from radiation poisoning, Craven heads to Bennett's house and kills the Northmoor agents, identifying one of them as Emma's killer. Bennett and Craven shoot each other, Craven takes the upper hand and forces Bennett to drink the radioactive milk. Craven denounces Bennett and fatally shoots him.

The terminally ill Jedburgh meets with the Senator and two political advisers who had hired him. They want to spin the Northmoor incident in a positive light. Jedburgh suggests that portraying it as an assassination attempt on the Senator could be an angle to keep Bennett's death out of the headlines. They are pleased with this idea, but the Senator continues talking and irks Jedburgh, in a Damascene conversion he makes his final decision on the matter by abruptly killing both advisers and the Senator declaring that 'this country' [the USA] is, "people who deserve better." When a young police officer nervously enters the Senator's room, Jedburgh asks the officer at gunpoint if he has children. When the officer replies yes, Jedburgh lowers his gun, allowing the officer to shoot him dead.

A young reporter for the local television station, who had spoken to Craven a few nights earlier, opens a letter from him containing DVDs recorded by Emma, revealing the conspiracy. As Craven dies in the hospital, the spirit of Emma comforts him. The ghosts of Craven and Emma are then shown walking down the corridor toward a bright, white light.

== Cast ==
- Mel Gibson as Craven, a Boston Police Department detective. Gibson is a fan of the television series, and the film marks his first starring role since 2002's We Were Soldiers and Signs, following time spent focusing on directing (The Passion of the Christ, Apocalypto) and an involuntary hiatus following a controversial 2006 alcohol fueled incident. Gibson attended a gun club with two policemen to improve his marksmanship for the film.
- Ray Winstone as Jedburgh, an ex-British Special Forces Captain turned private security operative sent to cover up the murder.
- Danny Huston as Jack Bennett, Northmoor's shady head.
- Bojana Novakovic as Emma Craven, Tom's murdered daughter.
- Shawn Roberts as Burnham, Emma's boyfriend.
- David Aaron Baker as Millroy.
- Jay O. Sanders as Whitehouse, Tom's detective partner and close friend.
- Denis O'Hare as Moore.
- Damian Young as Senator Jim Pine.
- Caterina Scorsone as Melissa, Emma's friend.
- Frank Grillo as Agent One, Emma's killer.
- Wayne Duvall as Chief of Police
- Gbenga Akinnagbe as Detective Darcy Jones.
- Maria Gabrielle Popa as Young Emma.
- Paul Sparks as Northampton Police Detective.
- Christy Scott Cashman as Detective Vicki Hurd.
- Peter Epstein as Agent Two.
- Tom Kemp as Paul Honeywell.
- Peter Hermann as Sanderman.
- Rick Avery as Robinson Jr.
- Frank L. Ridley as Automatic Weapons Cop.

== Production ==
In 2002, Martin Campbell announced that he was planning to adapt Edge of Darkness for the cinema. Active development began in early 2007 when Campbell met with producer Graham King, who first enlisted Australian playwright Andrew Bovell to write, and then William Monahan (fresh from winning an Academy Award for King's The Departed) to re-write the screenplay. Michael Wearing and BBC Films also co-produced the film.

Filming began on 18 August 2008 in Boston, Massachusetts. A scene where Craven scatters his daughter's ashes at a beach was filmed at Rockport on 25 and 26 September. They shot some scenes in Merrimac, Massachusetts from 15 September 2008 to 18 September 2008. Additional scenes were shot in Malden, Massachusetts in the old Malden hospital. Some of the final scenes were shot at a home in Manchester-by-the-Sea, Massachusetts. Additionally, Gibson and his crew set up shop for filming in western Massachusetts, with 180 staff staying in Northampton hotels. They shot in various locations in the Pioneer Valley, including Tully O'Reilly's Pub, the Northampton Athletic Club, and an older part of the Hampshire County Courthouse, all in Northampton. Also, Sugarloaf Mountain was shut down for a few days while they rented it out. They also filmed at the Notch Visitor Center, Rt. 116, Amherst, and right across the street from the Visitor Center, buried in Bare Mountain, The Notch Cold War Bunker stood in for the main entrance of the Northmoor facility.

Robert De Niro had been cast in the role of Jedburgh, but he walked out shortly after he arrived to begin shooting. A publicist for the actor cited "creative differences."

The film takes place in America, unlike the television series, which was based in England. "The idea was to transfer the story to a different time and place rather than just repeat what we did in England," Campbell said. "Boston seemed like the perfect location, because it does have a whole English, Irish signature on it." The film was originally scored by classical composer John Corigliano. However, the decision was made during postproduction, after Corigliano's score had been recorded and dubbed, to replace his score with a new one by Howard Shore.

== Reception ==
=== Critical response ===
On Rotten Tomatoes, the film has an approval rating of 54% based on 215 reviews and an average rating of 5.9/10. The website's critical consensus reads, "For better and for worse, Edge of Darkness offers vintage Mel Gibson, working within the familiar framework of a bloody revenge thriller." On Metacritic, the film has a weighted average score 55 out of 100 based on 34 critics, indicating "mixed or average reviews." Audiences polled by CinemaScore gave the film an average grade of "B+" on an A+ to F scale.

Film critic Richard Roeper gave the film a grade of "B", stating: "Gibson excels in this entertaining conspiracy thriller." Michael Rechtshaffen of The Hollywood Reporter called the film "An intense Mel Gibson performance anchors this brutally effective crime thriller." Some critics, such as A. O. Scott of The New York Times, saw a similarity to Taken. Other critics, such as Chicago Sun-Times film critic Roger Ebert, Chicago Tribune film critic Michael Phillips, and New Orleans Times-Picayune film critic Mike Scott, described Ray Winstone's character in the film as "intriguing."

=== Box office ===
On its first weekend, the film opened number two, grossing $17.1 million behind Avatar. The film went on to gross $43.3 million in the United States and Canada and $37.8 million in other countries for a worldwide total of $81.1 million, against a production budget of $80 million.

== Home media ==
The film was released by Warner Home Video on 11 May 2010 on DVD and Blu-ray.

== See also ==
- Edge of Darkness (2010 soundtrack)
