= ATT Chesterfield =

Coordinates: 42°22′3.26″N 72°47′59.95″W

ATT Chesterfield is a former facility owned by AT&T that was operational from the 1970s to the early 1990s. It was the location of a planned fallout shelter for Julie Nixon, who was attending Smith College at the time.

The location still exists and is being reused by a business.
