= When in Rome (novel) =

1970 detective novel by Ngaio Marsh

- First edition
- Author: Ngaio Marsh
- Language: English
- Series: Roderick Alleyn
- Genre: Detective fiction
- Publisher: Collins Crime Club
- Publication date: 1970
- Media type: Print
- ISBN: 0-00-231889-X
- Preceded by: Clutch of Constables
- Followed by: Tied Up in Tinsel

When in Rome is a detective novel by Ngaio Marsh; it is the twenty-sixth novel to feature Roderick Alleyn, and was first published in 1970.

The novel takes place in Rome, and concerns a number of murders among a group of tourists visiting the city; much of the action takes place in the "Basilica di San Tommaso".

== Synopsis ==
British author Barnaby Grant, vacationing in Rome, has his briefcase stolen with the manuscript of a new novel inside. Sebastian Mailer, a sinister tour guide of British origin, retrieves the manuscript and concocts an elaborate plot to frame Grant for plagiarism. To avoid this fate, Grant consents to be a celebrity guest in Mailer's tour groups.

Roderick Alleyn comes to Rome in pursuit of Mailer, who is a lieutenant in an international drug racket. With the cooperation of the local Questore, Valdarno, Alleyn enrolls incognito in the tour group to gather evidence. His fellow participants are Lady Sonia Braceley, an erstwhile society beauty ravaged by years of high living; the Hon. Kenneth Dorne, her drug-addicted nephew; Major Hamilton Sweet, an ex-military man; Sophy Jason, a children's author who falls in love with Grant; and the Baron and Baroness Van der Veghel, an eccentric Dutch couple. Their principal stop is to be the Basilica of San Tommaso, an important location in Grant's latest book.

Outside the Basilica, Mailer has an unexplained altercation with Violetta, a postcard-seller. Grant leads the group through the twelfth-century church and the layers of archaeological excavation tunnels beneath it. A hole in the church floor forms a kind of well, passing through many strata to reach a subterranean stream. Sophy looks into the well and thinks she sees Violetta's shadow pass along the wall of a lower gallery. Meanwhile Kenneth has broken away from the group. The tour culminates in a buried Roman house with a Mithraeum, where Lady Braceley becomes claustrophobic and panics. Major Sweet escorts her upstairs while Mailer goes off to find Kenneth, who presently returns on his own. After Sweet also returns, the Baroness compels everyone to pose for a group photograph in the Mithraeum, keeping them waiting while she fusses interminably with her camera. Mailer never reappears, and, after a fruitless search for him in the tunnels, the group departs in the care of his deputy Giovanni. Afterwards select guests are discreetly invited to a drug-fueled orgy.

Alleyn convinces Valdarno to search the tunnels again the next morning, disclosing Violetta's corpse concealed in an ancient sarcophagus. She proves to have been Mailer's estranged wife and former drug-smuggling accomplice, and it is assumed that he killed her after a further argument and somehow escaped. In Mailer's apartment Alleyn turns up documentary evidence for blackmail schemes worked upon Grant, Kenneth (over a theft committed in Perugia) and the Van der Veghels (who may be close relatives in an incestuous relationship). Valdarno assembles the tour-party guests in his office and Alleyn, whose identity is revealed, has them reconstruct events at the basilica: Sophy recalls hearing the sarcophagus lid being shut while the Baroness was taking her photograph.

Unsavoury details emerge about some of the tourists. Major Sweet, beneath his phony Colonel Blimp-esque persona, is a spy for the drug overlords, and is demanding bribes from Giovanni in exchange for a favourable report. Kenneth confirms that his excursion in the tunnels was a pretense for meeting Mailer to score drugs. Kenneth went back to rejoin the party but Mailer did not, as he had another appointment to keep.

In the ensuing days, the monks of the Basilica notice a smell of decay coming from the well. They confide in Alleyn, whom they find more congenial than the Roman police. Using borrowed excavation equipment, he climbs into the well and finds the corpse of Mailer wedged in a grating. The discovery prompts Valdarno to summon all the suspects to his office for a showdown, although half his attention is on violent student protests occurring in and around Piazza Navona. Major Sweet tries to flee Rome amid the chaos of the protests and is killed in a traffic accident. Giovanni, who hated Sweet, takes the opportunity to give false testimony implicating him in the murder of Mailer.

Valdarno accepts Sweet as the culprit; Alleyn is unsure. He has Kenneth's and the Baroness's photographs developed at the police lab. The Baroness's photos of the basilica are exposed and worthless, but Kenneth's photo in the Mithraeum shows the Baron not there. Alleyn conjectures that the Baron slipped away to pay off Mailer while the Baroness created a diversion with the group picture. Catching Mailer in the aftermath of Violetta's murder, the Baron became enraged, strangled him, and threw his body down the well. Unable to prove his theory, Alleyn lets the Baron walk free, calling him 'the nicest murderer I have met'.

== Development ==
Drug trafficking and drug abuse play a prominent part in several other Marsh novels: Enter a Murderer, Death in Ecstasy, Swing Brother Swing, Spinsters in Jeopardy, Clutch of Constables, Last Ditch and Grave Mistake.

There is a description of a student demonstration, and Marsh herself witnessed one briefly while in Rome as the guest of New Zealand's ambassador to Italy in summer 1968. She describes this in the 1981 edition of her autobiography, Black Beech and Honeydew:

It all seemed, in an odd sort of way, lackadaisical... A group of young men who had been lounging near a motorcycle parked under our windows, half-heartedly turned it over on its side and, after several, unsuccessful attempts, set fire to it and walked away. This was followed by a group of about a hundred young men erupting out of Navona and running down the side street, followed, though not very fast, by some of the police... They did not attempt to arrest anybody and as soon as their non-quarry got to the end of the street and stopped, the police, very sensibly I thought, also stopped and lit cigarettes.

Marsh's biographer Margaret Lewis contrasts the flippancy of this with the severity of the rioting that marred her European trip that summer, and suggests the influence that the political climate had on the novel: "the English upper classes are seen as thoroughly corrupt. Perhaps the heady politics of 1968 were reaching through, and the riot, described so lightly in the second edition of Black Beech and Honeydew, disturbed her more than she wanted to admit".

Marsh based the fictional San Tommaso basilica on Rome's San Clemente al Laterano, something that the New York Times reviewer commented on. The hotel-rooftop garden where Grant broods over the loss of his manuscript was inspired by the roof of the pensione in Florence where Marsh stayed later on the same trip.

Marsh made extensive enquiries into forensic details and Italian police procedure, with which she admitted struggling. On receipt of the manuscript in January 1970, her agent Edmund Cork wrote to her that it was her best novel to date, a verdict with which her American agent agreed.

== Reception ==
H.R.F. Keating wrote a very positive review for The Times, saying that Marsh's novels transcended the limits of genre fiction and reached the status of literature. In the case of When in Rome, he praised the novel's recreation of the Italian capital: "The book is not a puzzle struggling to dominate a setting. It is, shorn of distractions, a novel of place... under the outward appearances there is, pervading all, something suggestively disquieting, a fully evoked unease."

Maurice Richardson concluded a capsule review in The Observer, "excellent Roman detailed background for a lively euphoric thriller whodunit". Violet Grant in The Daily Telegraph called it "one of her best books for a long time". Francis Goff in The Sunday Telegraph wrote, "Smooth, charming, with plenty of undemanding Roman background."

When the novel was published in America by Little, Brown and Company the following year, The New York Times commented on the leisurely and atmospheric opening, (Note: That Marsh's novels are slow to start is a frequent complaint by critics.) but the review was largely positive. It concluded, "Rome would be the best place to read it, but if an armchair in your living room is all that is available, you can console yourself with this homicidal travelogue."

In 1981, Earl F. Bargainnier cited "the aging sybaritic Lady Sonia Braceley of When in Rome" as one of Marsh's most strikingly grotesque characters. A decade later, Kathryne Slate McDorman called Lady Braceley "one of the most pathetic creatures in Marsh's gallery", but offered a feminist perspective:

she is aware of no other reality beyond the reflection of herself that she sees in men's expressions... She is the final result, the finished product, of one of high society's most vivid nightmares: the wasted woman who has pawned her very soul for the ephemeral rewards of male approval, and who later finds herself bereft of the means to reclaim it.

In a 2002 article on crime fiction set on the peninsula, Susan H. Jayne was dismissive of the book as a whole: "Helen MacInnes's cold war thrillers set in Italy stand up fairly well, but Ngaio Marsh's visit to Fellini's Rome does not."

== Adaptations ==
In 2003, BBC Radio 4 broadcast a 60-minute adaptation of the novel starring Jeremy Clyde as Alleyn.

In 1970–1972, Ngaio Marsh worked on a stage adaptation of the novel with Barbara Toy, but this was never produced.

== Bibliography ==
- Bargainnier, Earl F. (1981). "Ngaio Marsh". In Bargainnier, Earl F. (ed.). 10 Women of Mystery. Bowling Green, OH: Bowling Green State University Popular Press. pp. 81–105. ISBN 0-87972-173-1.
- Harding, Bruce (1998). "Ngaio Marsh (1895-1982)". In Winks, Robin W.; Corrigan, Maureen (eds.). Mystery and Suspense Writers: The Literature of Crime, Detection, and Espionage. Volume 2: Ross Macdonald to Women of Mystery. New York: Scribner's. pp. 665–677. ISBN 0-684-80520-0.
- Lewis, Margaret (1998) [1st pub. Chatto & Windus 1991]. Ngaio Marsh: A Life. Scottsdale: Poisoned Pen Press. ISBN 1-890208-05-1.
- McDorman, Kathryne Slate (1991). Ngaio Marsh. Boston: Twayne. ISBN 0-8057-6999-4.
