= Spinsters in Jeopardy =

1953 detective novel by Ngaio Marsh

- First UK edition
- Author: Ngaio Marsh
- Language: English
- Series: Roderick Alleyn
- Genre: Detective fiction
- Publisher: Little, Brown
- Publication date: 1953
- Media type: Print
- Preceded by: Opening Night
- Followed by: Scales of Justice

Spinsters in Jeopardy is a detective novel by Ngaio Marsh; it is the seventeenth novel to feature Roderick Alleyn, and was first published in 1953.

The novel is set in Southern France, where Alleyn, his painter wife Agatha Troy and their young son Ricky are on holiday. Alleyn is tasked by his Scotland Yard superiors with meeting French police colleagues to discuss international drug trafficking through Marseilles. On the overnight sleeper train from Paris, the Alleyns witness what appears to be a fatal night-time stabbing in the illuminated window of a dramatically-set mediaeval castle overlooking the railway line. This proves to be the resort of an élite, louche group of socialites who are dabbling in Black Magic under the auspices of a smoothly dubious host and 'high priest' of a cult that clearly involves drug-taking, with vulnerable wealthy women potentially exploited. Alleyn's investigations are complicated by the kidnapping of Ricky from their hotel.

== Plot ==
With their young son Ricky, Agatha Troy and Inspector Roderick Alleyn discuss her distant relative P.E. Garbel, a chemist she has never met who sends Troy unusual letters from the Maritime Alps which talk about, among other things, bus routes. Alleyn suggests they visit France together to meet Garbel as this would provide him a good cover for a narcotics investigation in Roqueville, Garbel's home village. The Sûreté has been investigating an alleged drug ring in the area but have no uncovered any definitive proof.

As their train nears Roqueville, Alleyn and Troy spot a woman falling backwards in terror while a white-robed man stands over her with a blade in a window of a house. An attendant confirms that the house is the Château de la Chèvre d'Argent, owned by a M. Oberon, the alleged leader of this drug ring. Miss Truebody, another passenger, suffers a perforated appendix and the Alleyns agree to take her to the Chèvre d'Argent as the only nearby doctor, an Egyptian named Dr. Baradi, is staying there. As Miss Truebody has no living relations, the Alleyns take responsibility for her.

At the Château, Alleyn and his hired chauffeur Raoul assist Baradi in the operation. Meanwhile, Troy meets Oberon who, in addition to owning the Chèvre d'Argent, also runs a religious cult called Children of the Sun. His guests include Grizel Locke, an eccentric middle-aged woman, Ginny Taylor, a young new initiate and Robin Herrington, who cares for Ginny. Two other guests cause problems for he Alleyns. Carbury Glande is a painter whom Troy has met before and Annabella Wells is an actress whom Alleyn possibly had a fling with before he married Troy. Both Glande and Wells could possibly expose Alleyn as a member of Scotland Yard, something he wishes not be exposed. As he leaves, Alleyn name drops P.E. Garbel and, although none of the guests claim to know her, they all seemed shocked at the mention.

Raoul drives Troy and Ricky to Roqueville. Troy seeks out Garbel at home but has no luck. Alleyn waits at the Château for Raoul to collect him. Carrying out a covert search, he finds a ledger with Garbel's name written in it, relating to the local chemical factory. Baradi questions Alleyn about himself, then, when Alleyn mentions Garbel, falls silent.

When Alleyn arrives at his hotel, Troy is distraught: Ricky has been abducted. Troy went down to the hotel restaurant for lunch and when she returned, Ricky was gone. After a frantic search in the vicinity of the hotel, Troy glimpses Ricky on a balcony outside Garbel's apartment building. As they rush out, Alleyn notices flowers that have arrived: the card attached says Garbel is sorry to be away during their visit. By the time his parents arrive at the apartment, Ricky is no longer there. Alleyn searches the building and discovers that Troy's cousin is female, not male as they assumed. Garbel works for Oberon: her letters were cryptic warnings about drug manufacture.

Alleyn and the local Commissaire, Dupont, agree that Oberon's gang have taken Ricky to the factory, to keep Alleyn occupied and away from the Chèvre d'Argent. A phone call comes through demanding ransom: Alleyn agrees to drop off money. He and Dupont plan a course of action. At the factory, Alleyn recovers Ricky who identifies his kidnapper as Teresa, Raoul's girlfriend. Teresa claims she was hired to be Ricky's nanny and did not realize she was actually kidnapping him. She was simply following instructions provided to her by Oberon. Robin Herrington asks Alleyn for help extricating Ginny from Oberon's cult. They agree that, the following evening, when a ritual is planned, Herrington will get Ginny away from the Château, while Alleyn and Raoul infiltrate the ceremony wearing Herrington and Ginny's robes.

The next night, Dupont has the Château's electricity cut off. Alleyn and Raoul approach the Château stealthily but Alleyn encounters Oberon. Alleyn's cover story is that he has come to ask after Truebody, whom Oberon tells him has died. Baradi takes Alleyn to see the body laid out, but drops his torch, plunging the room into darkness. Examining the corpse, Alleyn finds a cavity under the left breast and immediately recognizes the body as the woman he saw murdered at the beginning of the novel, not Miss Truebody.

Alleyn pretends to leave but hides in Herrington's room. Grizel Locke enters: she is in fact Garbel, who Oberon has coerced into impersonating Locke. The real Locke died early the previous morning. The acolytes were told she overdosed on heroin, though Garbel suspects murder. Locke, Ginny's aunt, was worried for her niece and threatened to expose the cult. Baradi agreed to operate on Truebody as an opportunity to dispose of Locke's corpse: Locke would be buried as Truebody, and after the Alleyns had gone and Truebody had recovered, a false headstone would be put over Locke's grave.

Alleyn and Raoul infiltrate the ritual as planned. At the ceremony's climax when Oberon was to violate Ginny, they subdue Oberon and Baradi; Dupont arrests most of the other cult members. A train passes, and Alleyn sees the passengers reflected in Oberon's enormous mirror: he realizes that he saw a reflection of the murder, that the murderer was holding a dagger in his left hand, and that this was Baradi, the only left-handed celebrant. He leaves Garbel nursing the convalescent Truebody, her fellow spinster.

== Characters ==
- Chief-Detective Inspector Roderick Alleyn - of Scotland Yard
- Agatha Troy - his wife, an artist
- Ricky Alleyn - their 6-year old son
- Raoul Milano - Alleyn's hired chauffeur
- M. Dupont - of the Surete
- M. Oberon - owner of the Château de la Chèvre d'Argent and suspected drug baron
- Dr. Ali Baradi - a surgeon
- P.E. Garbel - a distant relative of Troy's
- Ginny Taylor - a young initiate into Oberon's Children of the Sun cult
- Robin Herrington - a young man interested in Ginny
- Carbury Glande - an artist and guest at the Château de la Chèvre d'Argent
- Annabella Wells - an actress and guest at the Château de la Chèvre d'Argent
- Miss Truebody - a train passenger from the Bermudas
- Teresa - Raoul's girlfriend

== Reception ==
Kirkus Reviews had a brief review of this novel, closing with "Good summer sustenance."

Philip Day wrote in The Sunday Times, "For her villains... Miss Marsh has fallen back on a very tired pair of stock characters; luck and guesswork take the place of detection, and the whole is a grave disappointment." The Times delivered a mixed review: "Spinsters in Jeopardy is not quite a vintage murder, and Miss Ngaio Marsh, returning to the theme of esoteric religions, has not quite recaptured the élan and plausibility of Death in Ecstasy. This is a thriller rather than a detective-story... Miss Marsh may not be as inventive as usual, but her painter’s eye for landscape and people is as good as ever." Maurice Richardson, reviewing in The Observer, wrote: "A read can always be guaranteed from Miss Marsh but you will need to hang your disbelief on a Upas tree before opening her this time." The Illustrated London News said, "The story is as unbridled as the goings-on; it is an unexpected lapse, full of embarrassments, but in a shamefaced way rather enjoyable."

In a critical essay on Marsh, Jessica Mann wrote, "Spinsters in Jeopardy... like the pre-war Death in Ecstasy uses the peculiarities of a lunatic and vicious religious sect as the peg for its plot... From this theme, as from others, Marsh retreats from full exploration; she is amused and sardonic, even a little disgusted, but not really interested, and the irrational urges of the devotees, the corrupt motives of those who batten on them, are seen wholly through a policeman's eye. It is interesting to compare this treatment with Margaret Millar's of a similar sect in How Like an Angel (1962). Millar makes events arise from the necessities of the cult and its dogma, rather than using it as merely a setting."

Kathryne Slate McDorman says of the portrait of the precocious Ricky in this novel, "Were it not for his flashes of childlike spontaneity, it would be tempting to accuse Marsh of having created merely a little adult; though she portrayed Ricky as extremely well mannered, she allowed the little boy in him to come through. After reading Marsh's account of her own life as an only child, it is tempting to see some of her fears and fantasies transferred to Ricky." Margaret Lewis strikes a similar note: "His vocabulary is remarkably well developed for his age, and the precociousness... strains the reader's credulity. Yet his panic in the train when left on his own in the compartment for a few moments is entirely convincing, and some of Ngaio's own childhood fears seem to be remembered here." (Note: Marsh calls herself "a delicate child, prone to fear"; describing her irrational belief that anything she ate might be poisoned, she says, "I supported the theme, so indefatigably explored by psycho-novelists, of the anguish of the only child. I was, I am afraid, a morbid little creature.")

== Themes ==
Several critics have commented that the novel revisits similar themes to Marsh's earlier Alleyn mystery novel Death in Ecstasy (1936), which also concerns a suspect cult with drug-taking a part of its practice and a dubiously charismatic cult leader, although the earlier book is set in fashionable London society, not Southern France. According to Marsh's biographer Margaret Lewis, Marsh drew on her knowledge of an actual 1890s scandal in her native Christchurch: The Temple of Truth, whose leader Arthur Bentley Worthington had "a fondness for wealthy but gullible widows". (Note: Maurice Richardson, picking up on Marsh's mention in Spinsters in Jeopardy of "the Swami Viva Ananda", suggests that she had Vivekananda in mind. The swami made several high-profile visits to the English-speaking West in the 1890s and gained disciples there, but (as Richardson pointed out) led a particularly ascetic life.) Lewis also says that Marsh based the sinister chateau on a Saracen fortress at Èze where she and her lifelong friends, the Rhodes family, holidayed in 1949.

Marsh's original title was Triptych of Spinsters, but, concerned that this might sound too highbrow, she offered Spinsters in the Sun as an alternative. In the words of Marsh scholar Bruce Harding, the title finally decided on reflects the fact that the novel features "three unmarried women in varying degrees of jeopardy".

The novel is one of several by Marsh where drug trafficking and drug abuse play a prominent part: Enter a Murderer (1935), Death in Ecstasy, Swing Brother Swing (1949), Clutch of Constables (1968), Last Ditch (1977) and Grave Mistake (1978). (Note: Bargainnier notes that, though Marsh as narrator rarely passes moral judgement on characters, an exception is the issue of drugs, "about which she obviously feels strongly".) It is the first where the Alleyns' son Ricky appears as a character; here he is six years old. Earl F. Bargainnier notes how much the novel (with its murder occurring very early in the story, the kidnapping of Ricky, and the action climax) departs from "the classical formulas" of Golden Age crime fiction, calling it "Hitchcockian". Lewis calls it "more of a thriller than a detective yarn".

== Publication ==
The novel was published in the United States in 1953 by Little, Brown of Boston, her usual American publisher, and in 1955 in an abridged edition titled The Bride of Death by Spivak of New York. It was published in Britain by William Collins in 1954.

== Bibliography ==
- Bargainnier, Earl F. (1981). "Ngaio Marsh". In Bargainnier, Earl F. (ed.). 10 Women of Mystery. Bowling Green, OH: Bowling Green State University Popular Press. pp. 81–105. ISBN 0-87972-173-1.
- Harding, Bruce (1998). "Ngaio Marsh (1895-1982)". In Winks, Robin W.; Corrigan, Maureen (eds.). Mystery and Suspense Writers: The Literature of Crime, Detection, and Espionage. Volume 2: Ross Macdonald to Women of Mystery. New York: Scribner's. pp. 665–677. ISBN 0-684-80520-0.
- Lewis, Margaret (1995). "To Ngaio, from her biographer, with affection and respect…". In Rahn, B.J. (ed.). Ngaio Marsh: The Woman and her Work. Metuchen, New Jersey: Scarecrow Press. pp. 1–22. ISBN 0-8108-3023-X.
- Lewis, Margaret (1998) [1st pub. Chatto & Windus 1991]. Ngaio Marsh: A Life. Scottsdale: Poisoned Pen Press. ISBN 1-890208-05-1.
- McDorman, Kathryne Slate (1991). Ngaio Marsh. Boston: Twayne. ISBN 0-8057-6999-4.
