= Tied Up in Tinsel =

1972 detective novel by Ngaio Marsh

- First edition
- Author: Ngaio Marsh
- Language: English
- Series: Roderick Alleyn
- Genre: Detective fiction
- Publisher: Collins Crime Club
- Publication date: 1972
- Media type: Print
- Preceded by: When in Rome
- Followed by: Black As He's Painted

Tied Up in Tinsel is a detective novel by Ngaio Marsh; it is the twenty-seventh novel to feature Roderick Alleyn, and was first published in 1972. The novel takes place at a country house in England over the course of a few days during the Christmas season.

== Plot ==
While Alleyn works in Australia, his artist wife Troy has accepted an invitation from client Hilary Bill-Tasman to spend Christmas at his ancestral home, Halberds. After the family's money vanished in the Depression, Hilary's father became a scrap merchant and prospered. He invested money successfully and became wealthy, sending Hilary to his own old school, after which Hilary became a gambler and won two fortunes.

Hilary has now moved into and is restoring Halberds. Commissioning his portrait from Troy is part of a programme to recreate his family's former status. Among Hilary's eccentricities is hiring servants from the local jail: all his domestic staff have served sentences for murder.

Hilary's other guests are his aunt and uncle, Colonel and Mrs Fleaton Forrester; his fiancée Cressida Tottenham, his uncle's flirtatious ward whom his aunt dislikes; and his mentor Bert Smith. Moult, the colonel's manservant, has disfiguring facial scars. The colonel is indulgent of his ward, partly because of his fondness for her father, who saved his life while they were in the military.

Troy sees Nigel the under-houseman building an ice sculpture around a large wooden crate outside: Hilary wants a model of his ancestral tomb instead of a snowman. A series of sinister 'practical jokes' on the houseguests recalls the various murders the servants have committed. Suspicion for these falls on Moult, who despises the ex-convicts.

For Christmas Day, Hilary has planned an elaborate Christmas-tree ceremony for local children, with the colonel heavily disguised as a Santa-like 'Druid' (Cressida, who used to act, will help costume him). Cressida tells Troy she has overheard Cuthbert the chief steward making what sounded like a death threat towards Moult.

At 8pm, bells chime loudly, then the children are led into the drawing-room. The French windows open and the Druid enters with a cart loaded with toys for the children, dances around the tree and leaves. Mrs Forrester talks with Cressida, then hurries out; Cressida explains to Troy that the colonel has been taken ill and Moult has stood in for him.

At dinner, Moult is needed to wait on the colonel and relieve Mrs Forrester. Since he is missing, Troy volunteers to do this; she sees that Moult has not returned the costume.

The next morning, Moult has still not reappeared. Hilary reports that Moult has the key to the locked box the Forresters keep their valuables and legal documents in; Mrs Forrester says that someone has tried to break open this strongbox with a poker.

Alleyn calls Troy from London: he has wrapped up matters in Australia. Hilary insists on inviting him to Halberds. On arriving, Alleyn gets Hilary to call the local police, advising that a search party will be necessary. Hilary shows Alleyn a poker that he saw in the fir-tree outside the window of his study. He is convinced the black residue on the end is japanning left by someone using the poker to force the Forresters' lacquered strongbox. Alleyn explains this is dried blood.

The local superintendent, Wrayburn, arrives. He hypothesizes that Moult was killed with the poker, that the poker ended up in the tree when the murderer threw it out of an upstairs window, and that Moult's body was thrown out of the window as well. Searching Moult's quarters, Alleyn and Wrayburn find a photograph of Moult with a small girl whom Wrayburn guesses to be his daughter.

Alleyn finds three of the servants moving the packing crate the ice sculpture was built on. Moult's body is hidden inside it. Alleyn believes that they discovered the body and panicked, knowing they would be suspected, but does not believe they are the murderers.

The police catch Cressida searching the Forresters' strongbox, which contains evidence that she is Moult's daughter. He got his scars when saving Col. Forrester's life. Cressida killed the manservant after discovering her paternity, knowing that the snobbish Hilary would never marry her if he knew her working-class origins, threw Moult's body out of the window while the bells drowned out all other noises, then stood in for the colonel herself. She herself committed the 'practical jokes'. As he and Troy leave, Alleyn observes cuttingly that when Cressida is released, Hilary may offer her a job as a parlourmaid.

== Themes ==
Marsh scholar Kathryne Slate McDorman compares the character of Cressida to another seductress, Madame Lisse in Marsh's Death and the Dancing Footman: (Note: McDorman quotes Marsh's description of Lisse ("Her dress was extremely simple, but in it her body seemed to be gloved rather than clothed") alongside that of Cressida ("she appeared to be gloved rather than clad in the very ultimate of expensive simplicity").) "Marsh seemed to enjoy these characters: they are not automatically condemned to being loathsome, unlike their male counterparts". She compares Hilary Bill-Tasman to Percival Pyke Period in Hand in Glove, "the other great snob Marsh created". McDorman sees social satire in the red herring of the servants: "When a murder occurs on the premises... it is easy for all the house guests to conclude immediately that one of the staff has again gratified a blood lust. Respectable upper-class English folk do not accept that one of their own could commit a heinous crime, especially if there are servants on whom to fix the blame – and Bill-Tasman's are completely vulnerable to such a charge. The murder, it turns out, hinges not on Bill-Tasman's 'social experiment' with murderers but on his social arrogance... Although innocent of the crime, Bill-Tasman, like Percival Pyke Period, contributes to the possibilities for wrongdoing by his single-minded, narrow standard for evaluating worth in others, and ultimately in himself."

== Setting ==
Kathryne Slate McDorman compares the wintry English setting to that of Death and the Dancing Footman, and (although the locale of Tied Up in Tinsel is not specified) suggests that the action takes place in Dorset, as in the earlier book.

According to her biographer Margaret Lewis, Marsh "had never spent Christmas in an ordinary English household, and her view of the practical side of preparing traditional dishes was very hazy"; she did not realise "that Christmas puddings are made weeks before the event, and sit maturing darkly in their bowls ready for lengthy boiling on the day" until her publishers pointed this out. At their suggestion, she replaced the ritual of stirring a pudding and making a wish with biting into a mince pie. Lewis comments that the entertainment Hillary stages for the local families is "an elaborate version of Ngaio's own Christmas parties": "Every Christmas she entertained the children of her friends to an elaborate 'Christmas Tree Party' when she tried to create the atmosphere of an English country house with church bells and carols echoing out into the hot Christchurch summer. She gave lavish presents to all her guests".

== Reception ==
Edmund Crispin wrote a mixed review for The Sunday Times: "the killer’s identity comes as a nice surprise, and the writing flows as gracefully as ever. Indeterminacy of mood, however, combines with the implausibility of the domestic set-up to leave a slight but definite feeling of ungrateful dissatisfaction." Despite Crispin's review, The Sunday Times listed the book in an end-of-year "selection of the year’s outstanding titles".

Maurice Richardson wrote in The Observer, "One of her more fantastic house-party whodunits... She doesn’t seem to have lost much of her zest." Matthew Coady in The Guardian was more mixed: "Agreeably effortless telling compensates for mystery’s dullness." H.R.F. Keating concluded a capsule review for The Times, "Buy every copy and, come December, give all your uncles a Marsh for Mistletide."

The New York Times reviewer called the ex-convict servants "so flagrantly suspect that no reader out of the cradle will believe in their guilt", but added, "I must say that Dame Ngaio had me honestly fooled as to the true murderer and to the way it was done. The solution though was no trouble to Roderick Alleyn, one of the house guests, who proves once again to be a handy man to have around when things get gory."

Marsh's biographer Margaret Lewis is not impressed by Tied Up in Tinsel: "The novel is very dated, and hopelessly old-fashioned... a return to the classic thirties style with little to recommend it... Little, Brown were happy to publish, however, and American readers enjoyed its quaint atmosphere. The difference between the fiction arising from direct and recent experience such as Clutch of Constables and When in Rome and those that depended on out-of-date memories was becoming very apparent."

== Bibliography ==
- Harding, Bruce (1998). "Ngaio Marsh (1895-1982)". In Winks, Robin W.; Corrigan, Maureen (eds.). Mystery and Suspense Writers: The Literature of Crime, Detection, and Espionage. Volume 2: Ross Macdonald to Women of Mystery. New York: Scribner's. pp. 665–677. ISBN 0-684-80520-0.
- Lewis, Margaret (1995). "To Ngaio, from her biographer, with affection and respect…". In Rahn, B.J. (ed.). Ngaio Marsh: The Woman and her Work. Metuchen: Scarecrow Press. pp. 1–22. ISBN 0-8108-3023-X.
- Lewis, Margaret (1998) [1st pub. Chatto & Windus 1991]. Ngaio Marsh: A Life. Scottsdale: Poisoned Pen Press. ISBN 1-890208-05-1.
- McDorman, Kathryne Slate (1991). Ngaio Marsh. Boston: Twayne. ISBN 0-8057-6999-4.
