= Death at the Dolphin =

1967 novel by Ngaio Marsh

- First editions (US & UK)
- Author: Ngaio Marsh
- Language: English
- Series: Roderick Alleyn
- Genre: Detective fiction, Theatre-fiction
- Publisher: Collins Crime Club (UK); Little, Brown (US)
- Publication date: 1966
- Media type: Print
- Preceded by: Dead Water
- Followed by: Clutch of Constables

Death at the Dolphin is a detective novel by Ngaio Marsh. It is the twenty-fourth novel to feature Roderick Alleyn, and was first published in 1966 as Killer Dolphin in the United States. The plot centres on a glove once owned by Hamnet Shakespeare, on display at a newly renovated theatre called the Dolphin. Several characters from the novel return in Marsh's final book, Light Thickens.

== Inspiration ==
Marsh's biographer Margaret Lewis notes that the renovation of the Dolphin Theatre echoes an incident during her 1949-51 sojourn in London, where she accompanied Tyrone Guthrie on a visit to a bomb-damaged theatre on the banks of the Thames, which Guthrie dreamed of renovating as a venue for Shakespeare performances during the Festival of Britain.

Bruce Harding suggests that the character of Peregrine Jay, a New Zealander who achieves theatrical success on relocating to England, was based on three of Marsh's proteges, Jonathan Elsom, Elric Hooper and James Laurenson. Harding compares Jeremy Jones's co-running of a small shop in London to Marsh's own "experiment in shopkeeping" with her friend Nelly Rhodes.

== Awards and nominations ==
The book was nominated for the Edgar Allan Poe Award for Best Novel of the Year in 1967, losing to Nicholas Freeling's The King of the Rainy Country.

== Plot ==
On a whim, rising theatre director Peregrine Jay views a derelict Victorian playhouse, The Dolphin Theatre on London's South Bank. He falls into a wartime bomb crater on the stage and is rescued from drowning by the theatre's owner, the enigmatic multi-millionaire Vassily Conducis. Conducis listens to and finances the young theatre practitioner's vision of a restored Dolphin Theatre. It opens with the premiere of Jay's play 'The Glove", inspired by a cheveril glove that Conducis owns and has shown to Jay, with faded documents suggesting it was made for Shakespeare's only son Hamnet, who died young.

The glove is a public sensation and publicity coup for the new theatre and its opening production. The production is a triumph, despite tensions among Jay's talented but fractious company. During the sold-out run, the glove is stolen and Harry Jobbins, the chirpy cockney nightwatchman is viciously battered to death by one of the two dolphin statues in the theatre foyer, commissioned by Conducis. The obnoxiously precocious child actor playing Hamnet Shakespeare is attacked and all but killed.

Inspector Roderick Alleyn, initially tasked with security arrangements for the glove, is assigned to investigate the murder and identifies the murderer, a member of the cast, one W. Hartley Grove who is blackmailing Conducis, as well as the history of how Mr Conducis came to own the Shakespearian glove.

The novel's murder plot is set against an engrossing account of how a historic London theatre is rescued from oblivion and a Shakespearian-themed modern play is produced, staged and launched into a solid West End triumph, with accompanying backstage dramas and tensions.

== Reception ==
Edmund Crispin wrote in The Sunday Times, "of the several excellent theatre stories she has written, I count this easily the best — a first-rate book, with an enticing opening, a fine whodunit plot and exceptional richness in characterisation, background and humour. Don't miss it on any account."

Maurice Richardson reviewed for The Observer: "There are some ingenious manipulations of Shakespearean relics. The murder is nicely delayed, and we don't get too much of Superintendent Alleyn and Inspector Fox. Well up to her intelligent standard."

Violet Grant summed up a capsule review for The Daily Telegraph, "Manna for bardophils [sic], with authentic stage background".

The Illustrated London News published an enthusiastic review: "in Death at the Dolphin she returns to a milieu in which she particularly excels, that of the theatre... Ranged before Alleyn and Fox are the full cast amid the smell of size and grease-paint, the fuss and fume of rehearsal, the backstage bitchery, and the closed circle of theatre folk which make this a story to be remembered."

== Bibliography ==
- Harding, Bruce (1998). "Ngaio Marsh (1895-1982)". In Winks, Robin W.; Corrigan, Maureen (eds.). Mystery and Suspense Writers: The Literature of Crime, Detection, and Espionage. Volume 2: Ross Macdonald to Women of Mystery. New York: Scribner's. pp. 665–677. ISBN 0-684-80520-0.
- Lewis, Margaret (1998). Ngaio Marsh: A Life. Scottsdale: Poisoned Pen Press. ISBN 1-890208-05-1.
