= Dead Water (novel) =

1964 detective novel by Ngaio Marsh

- First edition
- Author: Ngaio Marsh
- Language: English
- Series: Roderick Alleyn
- Genre: Detective fiction
- Publisher: Collins Crime Club
- Publication date: 1964
- Media type: Print
- Preceded by: Hand in Glove
- Followed by: Death at the Dolphin

Dead Water is a detective novel by Ngaio Marsh; it is the twenty-third novel to feature Roderick Alleyn, and was first published in 1964.

== Plot summary ==
The plot concerns a murder in a small coastal village, where a local spring believed to have miraculous healing properties is enriching many of the local residents who cater to those seeking healing they cannot find elsewhere. Miss Emily Pride, an old teacher of Alleyn's, inherits the place from her sister and comes to inspect her new property with plans to stop what she considers to be the vulgar exploitation of gullible and desperate people. Miss Emily begins receiving anonymous threats, apparently from locals who are upset by the proposed interruption of their new-found prosperity. After Miss Emily is physically attacked, Alleyn arrives to protect his beloved old teacher but soon the situation escalates to murder.

== Reception ==
Julian Symons wrote in The Sunday Times that the industry that springs up around the waterfall (including the festival) "gives Miss Marsh the chance to use her gift for gentle social comedy, but a decline sets in with the murder and a rather humdrum investigation. One for the faithful." Violet Grant in The Daily Telegraph shared Symons's opinion of the book's strong points: "There is some fun at the rather obvious expense of the local Festival, but it is not, on the whole, one of Miss Marsh’s best." Francis Iles reviewed for The Guardian, saying that the book's subject "admirably suits this lively writer: fraud combined with near mysticism based on a miracle-working fountain, with the bonus of a nicely puzzling little murder. As usual with Miss Marsh there are some well-observed characters, though Miss Emily Pride herself, that stiff-necked old lady, is perhaps rather too much of a fictional type." The Illustrated London News thought it a return to form, "Not that Dead Water is a patch on her earlier books featuring Handsome Alleyn: still, this story of murder in the 'healing' pool of a Cornish parody of Lourdes embodies a good mystery, and one of those tough, splendid old women in which Miss Marsh specialises with such skill." An end-of-year review of 1964's detective fiction in The Sunday Telegraph only gave the book one star from a possible four: "A bit olde Celtic fringe for a top mod ’tec. No better jobs nearer base?"

== Television adaptation ==
This novel was adapted in 1994 for the television series The Inspector Alleyn Mysteries, with Patrick Malahide as Roderick Alleyn and Belinda Lang as Agatha Troy. The island (Scottish in the feature-length film) was renamed from Portcarrow to Portcarrick, and the action took place in the 1940s; the screenplay was by T.R. Bowen. The cast included Margaret Tyzack (as Emily Pride) and Jane Lapotaire. Among the liberties taken with Marsh's plot was the grafting onto the story of Alleyn's proposal to Agatha Troy (from Death in a White Tie).
