= Light Thickens =

Book by Ngaio Marsh

- First edition
- Author: Ngaio Marsh
- Language: English
- Series: Roderick Alleyn
- Genre: Detective fiction, Theatre-fiction
- Publisher: Collins Crime Club
- Publication date: 1982
- Preceded by: Photo Finish

Light Thickens is a detective novel by Ngaio Marsh; it is the thirty-second, and final, novel to feature Roderick Alleyn, and was first published in 1982. The plot concerns the murder of the lead actor in a production of Macbeth in London, and the novel takes its title from a line in the play.

== Dedication ==
The novel is dedicated to the actors James Laurenson and Helen Thomas who had played Macbeth and Lady Macbeth, respectively, in the author's 1962 production of the play, which she had previously directed, also for The Canterbury University Players, in 1946. Laurenson is one of the three actors whom Bruce Harding suggests as models for the book's character Peregrine Jay, a New Zealander who has found theatrical success in England.

== Development ==
Marsh mentioned the embryonic novel in the 1981 edition of her autobiography, Black Beech and Honeydew: "I have often dallied with the notion of writing a book about a company rehearsing Macbeth, which, as every actor knows, is thought to be an unlucky play. I have not found it so and do not subscribe to the superstition. It would be satisfactory to bring the two major interests of my life together for, as it were, a final fling and the actor's response to the situation as it develops could be an intriguing ingredient."

Regarding the title, Marsh prevailed over her publishers, who wanted to call the novel The Scots Play. Its subject was close to the author's heart. In 1981, she wrote to her close friend John Balfour that the novel had been in her mind for a long time, was "hell" to write and would, she thought, appeal to theatre people rather than to her usual fans. Her characteristic modesty proved wrong, as the novel sold extremely well, receiving especially favourable reviews in the US. Her biographer describes the novel as effectively Ngaio Marsh's third production of the play.

== Reception ==
John Coleman in a capsule review for The Sunday Times called Light Thickens the "Last, honest bow from the mistress of the clued-in genre", though he made gentle fun of the fact that Alleyn was still a serving police officer after a professional life of over 60 years.

H. R. F. Keating wrote a highly enthusiastic review for The Times: "Dame Ngaio’s last book... recalls for us in plentitude [sic] her career and triumphs. Or rather her careers, since, set in a London theatre staging Macbeth, it is almost equally concerned with dramatic production, Dame Ngaio’s principal interest, as with delicious old murder". He noted several anachronistic details in a novel that ostensibly takes place in the 1980s but found these "charming". Overall he felt the book's greatest achievement was in its portrayal of theatrical characters: "These... bring us to Dame Ngaio’s greatest strength, her gift for characterization, the gift that moved almost all her books away from puzzle and into novel. It is not always, or even often, a depth or richness, but it is magnificent and memorable splashing out in colour."

Anthony Lejeune in The Daily Telegraph called the book "agreeably self-indulgent", noting that more than half of it passes in a detailed account of a rehearsal of Macbeth before a murder occurs. He concluded: "Dame Ngaio’s thoughts about the play are at least as interesting as her detection, and as always she writes most elegantly."

Marsh's biographer Margaret Lewis chooses as a representative American review the one in The Los Angeles Times: "No playwright could deserve a better curtain."

Marilyn Stasio, writing in The New York Times, said of Marsh's novels, "To my thinking, no other writer evokes "the incense of the playhouse" or describes the technical details of stage production with the degree of authenticity that Dame Ngaio achieved in novels like Enter a Murderer (1941), Killer Dolphin (1966), Night at the Vulcan (1951) and Light Thickens (1982).

Like Shakespeare's play, Light Thickens is gory and dramatic, but apart from the traditional murder mystery at its centre, and its use of the theatrical superstitions surrounding Macbeth, the book describes in absorbing detail the rehearsal, production and run of a "flawless" production, with the backstage tensions and theatrical detail conveyed with all the author's style, verve and experience. Especially intriguing, among her usual dramatis personae of suspects, including the grandly arrogant leading man and gracious leading lady, are the characters of two actors - Rangi, the young Maori who plays one of the witches, and Gaston Sears, the obsessive fight director who also plays Seyton.

== Relation to prior novels ==
The novel takes place in the same theatre as Marsh's previous novel Death at the Dolphin, and a number of characters from the earlier book reappear, including director-playwright Peregrine Jay and set designer Jeremy Jones. Light Thickens features a hard-left Equity representative who attempts to politicise fellow cast-members and who secretly belongs to an organisation called "the Red Fellowship": Bruce Harding describes this detail as "anachronistic", comparing Marsh's depiction of a Communist character in The Nursing Home Murder (1935).

== Bibliography ==
- Harding, Bruce (2019). Ngaio Marsh: A Companion to the Mystery Fiction. Jefferson, North Carolina: McFarland & Company. ISBN 978-0-7864-6032-8.
- Harding, Bruce (1998). "Ngaio Marsh (1895-1982)". In Winks, Robin W.; Corrigan, Maureen (eds.). Mystery and Suspense Writers: The Literature of Crime, Detection, and Espionage. Volume 2: Ross Macdonald to Women of Mystery. New York: Scribner's. pp. 665–677. ISBN 0-684-80520-0.
- Lewis, Margaret (1998) [1st pub. Chatto & Windus 1991]. Ngaio Marsh: A Life. Scottsdale: Poisoned Pen Press. ISBN 1-890208-05-1.
