= Photo Finish (novel) =

1980 detective novel by Ngaio Marsh

- First edition
- Author: Ngaio Marsh
- Language: English
- Series: Roderick Alleyn
- Genre: Detective fiction
- Publisher: Collins Crime Club
- Publication date: 1980
- Media type: Print ()
- Pages: 262
- ISBN: 0-00-231857-1
- Preceded by: Grave Mistake
- Followed by: Light Thickens

Photo Finish (novel) is a detective novel by Ngaio Marsh; it is the thirty-first, and penultimate, novel to feature Roderick Alleyn, and was first published in 1980. Set in a millionaire's island mansion on a lake in New Zealand's South Island, it is the last of Ngaio Marsh's four New Zealand set novels - the others being Vintage Murder (1937), Colour Scheme (1943) and Died in the Wool (1945).

== Plot summary ==
Inspector Alleyn and his wife, the painter Agatha Troy, are invited to the luxury home of millionaire Montague V Reece, newly built on a lake in New Zealand's South Island for his mistress, the international opera star Isabella Sommita. Alleyn's commission is to investigate and stop the activities of a masked paparazzo who has been persecuting Sommita with unauthorised, unflattering photos published under the name of 'Strix'. Troy is commissioned to paint the diva's portrait.

An extended house party gathers for the world premiere of a new opera 'The Alien Corn', based on the biblical Ruth story and featuring La Sommita's famous high note A 'in alt', composed by a handsome young composer. La Sommita scooped up this composer as her latest lover. She lacks the judgement and taste to see that the opera is no good.

"Corn is right", as her longtime vocal coach Signor Lattienzo comments. The premiere is an embarrassing fiasco and La Sommita is found dead in her bedroom, stabbed through the heart with a photo of herself impaled on the dagger.

== Reception ==
Newgate Callendar (pseudonym for Harold C. Schonberg} in The New York Times was impressed that Marsh wrote so well, though having already turned 80. Of this novel, he said "Part of the solution has elements of the old locked-door problem. Characterizations are, as always, sharply drawn, and there is a great deal of quiet humor. Photo Finish is a book that should make all readers happy."

== Background ==
Marsh biographer Joanne Drayton quotes TV presenter Max Cryer reporting that Marsh told him in an interview at the time of the novel's publication, that the character of Isabella Sommita was inspired by Maria Callas.
