= Scales of Justice =

Scales of Justice may refer to:

- Scales of justice (symbol), scales held by Lady Justice symbolizing the measure of a case's support and opposition
- Scales of Justice (miniseries), a 1983 Australian television drama
- "Scales of Justice", a song by Avantasia from the 2010 album The Wicked Symphony
- Scales of Justice (novel), a novel by New Zealand writer Ngaio Marsh featuring her character Inspector Roderick Alleyn
- "Scales of Justice", a season 3 episode of The Loud House
- The Scales of Justice, a series of 13 cinema shorts produced in the UK between 1962 and 1967, later shown as a TV series
- The Scales of Justice (film), a 1914 silent film drama

== See also ==
- Justice
- Nyaya Tharasu, a 1989 Indian film
