= Scales of Justice (novel) =

1955 detective novel by Ngaio Marsh

- First edition
- Author: Ngaio Marsh
- Language: English
- Series: Roderick Alleyn
- Genre: Detective fiction
- Publisher: Collins Crime Club
- Publication date: 1955
- Media type: Print
- Preceded by: Spinsters in Jeopardy
- Followed by: Off With His Head

Scales of Justice is a detective novel by Ngaio Marsh. It is the eighteenth novel to feature Roderick Alleyn, and was first published in 1955.

With a classic 'Golden Age' crime novel's setting, in the idyllic, self-contained, rural English community of Swevenings, the suspects are all members of a tight-knit social group revolving around the local baronet and his family, the Lacklanders.

== Plot summary ==
The plot concerns the brutal murder of Colonel Carterette, an enthusiastic fisherman, who is preparing for publication of the deceased baronet's memoirs. The memoirs include the admission that, as a high-ranking diplomat before World War Two, the baronet had treasonably put class before country in what has been called the Herrenvolk democracy. He knowingly let a young member of the embassy staff take the blame. The young man in question, who idolised the Lacklander ambassador, had committed suicide and his eccentric father is now the murdered colonel's neighbour.

The novel represents a shift in the author's presentation of the English gentry, with whom she was on close terms from her youthful days in New Zealand, and then in 1920s London. Comparison has been made with Marsh's somewhat more deferential pre-War presentation of the English landed gentry in earlier Alleyn novels. Marsh's biographer Margaret Lewis comments, "Marsh's romantic view of the feudal English village was at last beginning to crack". The 1941 Surfeit of Lampreys shows a more ambivalent attitude.

Through its plot, characters and solution, the book is frankly critical of its rural gentry, their values and actions, especially in key confrontations between Lady Lacklander and the dead boy's father, and between the kindly, conservative District Nurse Kettle and the interloper revealed to be the murderer, for whom considerable reader sympathy is elicited.

== Title ==
The method of solution of the murder revolves around the proposition that fish scales are individually identifiable in the same way as human fingerprints. Hence the punning title.

== Reception ==
Francis Iles wrote a very positive review for The Sunday Times: "Miss Ngaio Marsh might be said to be now occupying the throne regrettably vacated by Miss Dorothy L. Sayers, in that she brings the true detective story closer to the straightforward novel than any other woman writer. Her work, in fact, is as nearly flawless as makes no odds. Character, plot, wit, good writing, sound technique: all are there, together with that final requirement of the detective-story writer, ability to bamboozle the reader." He saluted Scales of Justice as "right up to sample, with a most ingenious fishy clue (which is far from being a red herring), a nice country setting, and a bevy of well-assorted characters of whom one, Nurse Kettle, seemed to me quite brilliantly drawn".

The review in The Illustrated London News was more mixed: "This is a fishy problem all through: and in the early stages it is masterly and delightful. But I have come to regard Chief-Inspector Alleyn as a fatal handicap." Milward Kennedy in The Manchester Guardian mentioned the book dismissively in an overview of contemporary British crime fiction. Whereas "Twenty-five years ago the trend was towards a professional realism in detection", Kennedy noted a move towards whodunits set abroad or in the historical past; he cited Scales of Justice as one of several recent crime novels that "achieve the same effect by staginess of setting".

== Television adaptation and accusations of snobbism ==
This novel was adapted in 1994 for the television series The Inspector Alleyn Mysteries, with Patrick Malahide as Roderick Alleyn, Elizabeth Spriggs as Lady Lacklander and Frances Barber as Mrs Cartarette.

According to Marsh's first biographer Margaret Lewis, a proposed and abandoned 1955 BBC radio adaptation has the reader's filed note: "we should have to eliminate the appalling snobbishness". Dr Lewis counters that, "a truer reading of the novel would be that the appalling snobbishness is accurately depicted and firmly ridiculed by the author".

== Bibliography ==
- Harding, Bruce (1998). "Ngaio Marsh (1895-1982)". In Winks, Robin W.; Corrigan, Maureen (eds.). Mystery and Suspense Writers: The Literature of Crime, Detection, and Espionage. Volume 2: Ross Macdonald to Women of Mystery. New York: Scribner's. pp. 665–677. ISBN 0-684-80520-0.
- Lewis, Margaret (1998) [1st pub. Chatto & Windus 1991]. Ngaio Marsh: A Life. Scottsdale: Poisoned Pen Press. ISBN 1-890208-05-1.
