= Vintage Murder =

1937 detective novel by Ngaio Marsh

- First edition
- Author: Ngaio Marsh
- Language: English
- Series: Roderick Alleyn
- Genre: Detective fiction, Theatre-fiction
- Publisher: Geoffrey Bles
- Publication date: 1937
- Media type: Print
- Pages: 275
- Preceded by: Death in Ecstasy
- Followed by: Artists in Crime

Vintage Murder is a detective novel by Ngaio Marsh; it is the fifth novel to feature Roderick Alleyn, and was first published in 1937. Based in New Zealand, the plot centres on a travelling theatrical troupe and prominently features Doctor Rangi Te Pokiha, a Māori, and a "tiki" (hei-tiki) a Māori fertility pendant.

== Plot summary ==
Chief Inspector Roderick Alleyn is traveling through New Zealand while he recovers from an operation. On a train with the famous Carolyn Dacres Comedy Company, on tour of New Zealand, Alleyn befriends members of the troupe. Among them are Susan Max, an actress he met previously, Carolyn Dacres and her husband Alfred Meyer, owner of Incorporated Playhouses. Alleyn's identity as a Scotland Yard officer is secret to most of the actors, but he reveals himself to Meyer and Dacres when Meyer insists he was nearly murdered when someone allegedly tried to push him off the train. A young actress named Valerie Gaynes reports stolen money and jewels, but Alleyn does not believe the incidents are related.

Once in Middleton, Alleyn joins up with the acting troupe for Carolyn's birthday celebration where he presents Carolyn with a Maori tiki, a symbol of fertility. Meyer plans an elaborate charade for his wife in which a jeroboam of champagne will fall down from the theater ceiling and land in a basket. Despite many successful practice runs, the bottle drops down, hits Meyer on the head and kills him. Foul play is suspected and when Alleyn investigates the contraption, he finds a small weight when a larger one should have been and was used previously. He also finds the tiki on the ground nearby.

Everyone has an alibi before and after the incident, so no one seems to have been able to remove the weight than put it back after the murder. The obvious suspect is George Mason, Meyer's partner who is set to inherit his estate, but he has the strongest alibi. Alleyn and local police's attention veers toward Valerie Gaynes' stolen money. A young actor named Courtney Broadhead seems the likeliest thief because he mysteriously was able to pay off gambling debts without explanation. However, another actor named Francis Liversidge is too keen to blame Broadhead and Alleyn begins to suspect him. Liversidge, in private, admits to taking Valerie's money for vague reasons of his own. Meyer was aware of this and confronted the actor.

Meanwhile, Alleyn falls smitten with Carolyn Dacres and works to clear her name. He confronts her about the tiki and she admits that she is the one who replaced the weight on the contraption. She knew about her husband's surprise for her birthday and after the murder, she placed the small weight on the device to make it look a simple accident when the weights were mixed up. She did so to protect Hailey Hambeldon, an actor who has thrice asked Carolyn to leave her husband and marry him. She insists Hailey is innocent but believes the police would suspect him. She accidentally dropped the tiki backstage and this is the vital clue Alleyn needs to solve the case since he now knows the murderer never had to go back up to the contraption after the murder.

The murderer is George Mason. Mason was heavily indebted due to a number of failed projects and he needed his inheritance from Meyer. Although several people claimed to see Mason the entire day before the murder, they are actually incorrect. Mason allegedly spent the afternoon in his office at the back of the theater. Several people saw him there but not the entire time. He escaped the theater through the back entrance, circled around and removed the weight from the device to set it off balance. He returned to the office the same way. Other characters claimed it was impossible for Mason to visit the contraption because they were in the area. However as Alleyn explains, Mason used a series of opened doors and large props to bounce around the area undetected.

== Characters ==
- Chief Inspector Roderick Alleyn of Scotland Yard
- Inspector Fox (via correspondence only)
- Inspector Wade of the New Zealand Police
- Sergeants Packer and Cass
- Carolyn Dacres - a leading actress of the stage
- Alfred Meyer - her husband, proprietor of Incorporated Playhouses
- Hailey Hambledon - an actor
- George Mason - Meyer's partner
- Dr. Rangi Te Pokiha - a local Maori doctor
- Ted Gascoigne - the stage manager
- Susan Max - a veteran stage actress who last appeared in Enter a Murderer
- St. John Ackroyd - a comedian
- Valerie Gaynes - a young, talentless actress
- Francis Liversidge - an actor
- Courtney Broadhead - a young stage actor
- Brandon Vernon - a character actor
- Bob Parsons - a dresser

== Allusion to other novels in series ==
One of the cast members was a minor character in Enter a Murderer, and refers to that case early in the story.

== Allusion to real dance troupe ==
The inspiration for this novel's theater troupe, the Carolyn Dacres Comedy Company, comes from the real-life Allan Wilkie Company to which Marsh once belonged.

== Television adaptation ==
Vintage Murder was one of four Alleyn novels adapted for South Pacific Television in 1977. Alleyn was played by George Baker. The scene of the onstage killing was shot in the Theatre Royal, Christchurch, and featured Marsh herself "in a brief Hitchcockian cameo wildly applauding the cast".
