= The Inspector Alleyn Mysteries =

British detective television series

- Genre: Crime drama
- Starring: Patrick Malahide; Belinda Lang; Tim Dutton; Sandy Welch; Leslie Schofield; Mark Penfold; Simon Williams
- Country of origin: United Kingdom
- Original language: English
- No. of seasons: 2
- No. of episodes: 9

Production
- Executive producers: George Gallacio; Raghav Shome
- Producers: Diana Kyle; Michael Bartley
- Production location: United Kingdom
- Running time: 90 minutes

Original release
- Network: BBC One
- Release: 23 December 1990 – 29 August 1994

The Inspector Alleyn Mysteries is a British detective television series, broadcast on BBC1, which was adapted from nine of the novels by Dame Ngaio Marsh, featuring the character Chief Inspector Roderick Alleyn. The pilot episode was shown in 1990, with Simon Williams playing the part of Alleyn. Two series followed in 1993 and 1994, with Patrick Malahide replacing Williams in the title role.

== Premise ==
In the 1990 pilot episode, the character of Alleyn was played by Simon Williams. William Simons was cast as Alleyn's right-hand man and "Dr Watson", Detective Inspector Fox, and Belinda Lang starred as painter Agatha Troy, Alleyn's love interest. When a full series finally came to screen three years later in 1993, Simon Williams was unavailable, and the role of Alleyn was filled by Patrick Malahide, while Simons and Lang reprised their roles. Over the course of two series, eight episodes were broadcast, each focusing on a separate novel in the series. Both Malahide series were released on DVD in 2007, via Acorn Media. In 2011, Acorn acquired the rights to the pilot, and in 2012, issued a repackaged version of the set containing the Williams pilot. This set was also released in Australia. Unlike the original novels, whose first story takes place as early as 1934, after World War I, the pilot and thus all subsequent episodes take place after World War II, with "Artists in Crime" being set in late 1948.

== Cast ==
- Simon Williams as Chief Inspector Roderick Alleyn (pilot only)
- Patrick Malahide as Chief Inspector Roderick Alleyn
- William Simons as Inspector Fox
- Belinda Lang as Agatha Troy
- Tim Dutton as D.S. Bailey
- Sandy Welch as D.C. Robinson
- Leslie Schofield as A.C.C. Connors
- Mark Penfold as Doctor Curtis
- Derek Benfield as Alfred Belt
- James Aitken as James

== Episodes ==
=== Pilot (1990) ===
No.	Title	Directed by	Written by	Original release date
1	"Artists in Crime"	Silvio Narizzano	Trevor Bowen	23 December 1990
After an artist's model dies in a suspicious incident, Alleyn and his down-to-earth assistant Fox investigate. Matters get complicated with a houseful of suspects, blackmail, another death, and Alleyn's growing attraction to the painter Agatha Troy.

=== Series 1 (1993) ===
No.	Title	Directed by	Written by	Original release date
2	"A Man Lay Dead"	Sarah Pia Anderson	Barbara Machin	18 April 1993
Alleyn cancels his holiday with Troy to investigate a murder connected to a stolen chalice, but he's called when a second murder occurs at uncle's estate.
3	"The Nursing Home Murder"	Silvio Narizzano	Kevin Laffan	25 April 1993
A member of Parliament who has taken controversial stands on Palestine and A-bomb development is murdered during a routine appendectomy.
4	"Final Curtain"	Martyn Friend	Hugh Leonard	2 May 1993
An egotistical Shakespearean ham actor gathers his dysfunctional extended family in his mansion on his 75th birthday for the reading of his will.
5	"Death at the Bar"	Michael Winterbottom	Alfred Shaughnessy	9 May 1993
During a display of dart throwing in a Cornish pub a man's hand is impaled by a dart, and he dies shortly afterward from cyanide - although no one can explain how.
6	"Death in a White Tie"	John Woods	Ken Jones	16 May 1993
Alleyn enlists the help of his friend Lord Robert "Bunchy" Gospell to uncover a society blackmailer. After Lord Robert is killed, a murder hunt follows among the world of titled heiresses, gamblers and adulterers.

=== Series 2 (1994) ===
No.	Title	Directed by	Written by	Original release date
7	"Hand in Glove"	Martyn Friend	Ken Jones	10 January 1994
A divorced and disliked man living in a nobleman's estate is found in a sewer ditch after someone rolled a concrete pipe on his head.
8	"Dead Water"	John Woods	Trevor Bowen	1 April 1994
Alleyn's old French teacher, the landlord of an idyllic Scottish island, is receiving death threats because she's blocking its development as a health spa.
9	"Scales of Justice"	Jim Goddard	Cyril Williams	29 August 1994
The publication of a war hero's memoirs and his dispute with a neighbouring fisherman about poaching leads to a murder.

== Syndication ==
The series aired in the United States on PBS's Mystery!.
