= Black as He's Painted =

1974 detective novel by Ngaio Marsh

Black As He's Painted
- First edition
- Author: Ngaio Marsh
- Language: English
- Series: Roderick Alleyn
- Genre: Detective fiction
- Publisher: Collins Crime Club
- Publication date: 1974
- Media type: Print
- Preceded by: Tied Up in Tinsel
- Followed by: Last Ditch

Black As He's Painted (1974) is a detective novel by Ngaio Marsh, the 28th to feature Roderick Alleyn.

The plot concerns the newly independent fictional African nation of Ng'ombwana, whose president and Alleyn went to school together, and a series of murders connected to its embassy in London.

== Development ==
The novel was written in New Zealand in the late Spring and Summer of 1973, and a year later was on the Sunday Times best-seller list in the UK, as well as proving a best-seller in the USA.

Marsh's first biographer Margaret Lewis quotes a letter Marsh wrote in March 1973: "I've gone into purdah with a new book. It's always a huge effort to get back into harness after an interval in the theatre and this time it's been uphill all the way... I've saddled myself this time with a complicated and hideously exacting mise-en-scene and am just crossing the halfway mark, full of black forebodings laced with pale streaks of hope." Dr Lewis quotes Marsh's editor at Collins, Robert Knittel, writing in September 1973: "I have just finished reading your latest novel and I think it is splendid. A real vintage Ngaio Marsh."

The cat in this novel has the same name as one owned by Marsh, per her biographers. [Living] “In this colorful remnant of traditional England, Marsh, a cat person as you might expect, adopted a stray feline, whom she named Lucy Lockett after a character in John Gay's The Beggar's Opera and an English nursery rhyme Lucy Locket:

Lucy Lockett lost her pocket
Kitty Fisher found it
Not a penny was there in it
Only ribbon round it”

== Plot summary ==
The novel is set in the 'Embassy quarter' of London's Knightsbridge and South Kensington.

Sam Whipplestone retires from the Foreign Office and buys a charming house at No 1 Capricorn Mews, not far from Palace Park Gardens where a palatial Georgian mansion now houses the Embassy of Ng'ombwana, a newly independent African republic. Sam Whipplestone had lived in Ng'ombwana for some years, speaks the language and is a Foreign Office expert on the country. Mr Whipplestone buys the property from Mr Sheridan, who remains as tenant of the basement flat, and acquires the services of Mr & Mrs Chubb, resident on the top floor, to cook and clean for him. He adopts an abused stray black cat he names Lucy Lockett, who plays a key role in the story.

Alleyn admits it is unusual that the new republic having an embassy rather than a High Commission, while remaining within the British Commonwealth, an arrangement insisted upon by the new president.

The Ng'ombwanan president, Bartholomew Opala, is an intelligent and formidable former barrister. He was educated at "an illustrious public school", where his best friend was Roderick Alleyn and his nickname was 'The Boomer'. As president, he is making a state visit to London. The Special Branch is alarmed about the security of this president; they send Alleyn out to Ng'ombwana beforehand to use the "old school tie" to persuade the president to comply with necessary security arrangements. Alleyn succeeds.

At a major reception in the London Embassy, an attempt is made on the President's life, but it is the Ambassador, standing beside him, who is fatally skewered by an African spear. The investigation, headed by Alleyn and his Scotland Yard support team of Fox, Bailey and Thompson and his Special Branch colleague Fred Gibson, is hampered by the diplomatic complications of a murder committed on "foreign soil" in an embassy, and it doesn't help that Alleyn's wife Agatha Troy is painting a portrait of The Boomer at his request, which she senses will be the magnum opus of her illustrious career.

Capricorn Mews is home to a deeply unpleasant cast of suspects with colonial Ng'ombwanan connections, all of whom attended the embassy reception and have been meeting in Sheridan's basement flat, to work for régime change. The motley conspirators include Colonel Cockburn-Montfort, former head of the Ng'ombwanan Army, and his wife, both alcoholics, and an obese brother and sister, formerly wealthy business owners in Ng'ombwana, now running a small pottery in Capricorn Mews, "K & X Sanskrit: Pigs".

== Characters ==
- Samuel Whipplestone, retired from the Foreign Office, lives in Capricorn Mews
- Lucy Lockett, his black cat
- Mr Sheridan, in the basement flat
- Chubb, house servant
- Mrs Chubb, his wife
- The Ambassador in London for the new republic of Ng'ombwana
- President of Ng'ombwana, the Boomer, Bartholomew Opala
- Colonel and Mrs Cockburn-Monfort, retired military
- Kenneth Sanskrit, merchant
- Xenoclea Sanskrit, his sister
- Chief Superintendent Roderick Alleyn, CID
- Agatha Troy, his wife and a well-known painter
- Inspector Fox, CID
- Superintendent Gibson, Special Branch, CID
- Detective-Sergeant Bailey, finger-print expert
- Detective-Sergeant Thompson, police photographer

== Reception ==
Kirkus Reviews referred to Dame Marsh as “perdurable”, in choosing the title. The brief review seems to say the novel is an acquired taste, closing with “As indispensable as that anchovy toast which appears at teatime if it's the taste you once acquired.”

== Allusion to real places ==
The fictional Baronsgate and Capricorns (Place, Square, Mews, etc), designated variously as SW3 or SW7, are clearly based on Prince's Gate and Queen's Gate in London. The fictional places also reference the nearby Montpeliers where Marsh had rented homes during her frequent London stays. It is an unusual setting and plot for a classic whodunit of the kind Ngaio Marsh wrote.
