= Artists in Crime =

1938 detective novel by Ngaio Marsh

- First edition
- Author: Ngaio Marsh
- Language: English
- Series: Roderick Alleyn
- Genre: Detective fiction
- Publisher: Geoffrey Bles
- Publication date: 1938
- Media type: Print
- Preceded by: Vintage Murder
- Followed by: Death in a White Tie

Artists in Crime is a detective novel by Ngaio Marsh; it is the sixth novel to feature Roderick Alleyn, and was first published in 1938. The plot concerns the murder of an artists' model; Alleyn's love interest Agatha Troy is introduced.

== Plot summary ==
The novel opens aboard a passenger ship en route from New Zealand to Vancouver via Hawaii. Among the passengers are the painter Agatha Troy, who is painting the receding wharf at Suva, discreetly observed by Scotland Yard's Inspector Roderick Alleyn returning from his last case in New Zealand. Alleyn falls in love with Troy at first sight but she initially finds him irritating. Letters back to England from Troy and Alleyn establish their hesitant initial, awkward acquaintance.

Back in England, Troy hosts her art class consisting of eight students who paint and sculpt model Sonia Gluck. Sonia is a temperamental model who often breaks her uncomfortable pose on her throne, which requires Troy or another student to shove her shoulder down back in place. Troy takes steps to ensure promiscuity will not take place; only one of the students is a drug-user. Sonia has had affairs with both unpleasant but very talented sculptor Wolf Garcia and Basil Pilgrim, whose father is a deeply religious peer. Valmai Seacliff is engaged to Pilgrim but had past dalliances and flirtations with Cedric Malmsley, Watt Hatchett and Fracis Ormerin. Malmsley decides to paint Sonia with a dagger stabbing her through the back and Troy and the students set up the throne with a knife poking out from under the boards in such a way that it lines up with the model's heart. The knife is removed before Sonia takes up the position once again.

After a weekend where everyone went away from Troy's home and studio at Tatler's End, class resumes on Monday. Sonia breaks her pose once again and Valmai Seacliff pushes her back into place. However, the knife is mysteriously under her and Sonia is impaled to death. Alleyn, who is staying nearby with his mother, is called to investigate. The tension between Alleyn and Troy is palpable as he is embarrassed and coy around her and she detests his career at Scotland Yard. The prime suspect is Garcia who was allegedly engaged to Sonia and had ample time to place the knife in the throne when everyone else was away. However, Garcia is missing and appears to have taken his supplies and work with him. Phillida Lee tells Alleyn that she overheard Garcia and Sonia arguing and heard something about a meetup Friday night. All of the students except Garcia have strong alibis. Most were in London while Pilgrim and Seacliff were roughly twenty miles away and staying with friends of his.

Autopsy results show Sonia was with child and a meeting with her friend Bobbie reveals the father was Garcia. However, Sonia blackmailed Pilgrim over this because he is wealthy and she knew he would pay her to keep silent. Bobbie will say no more other than she is sure Garcia killed Sonia. Much of Alleyn and his team's focus shifts to where Garcia may have disappeared to. He mentioned having a warehouse somewhere in London. Moreover, his heavy statue has also disappeared. Alleyn suspects Garcia transported the statue to the warehouse but none of the local moving companies say Garcia hired them. He examines Troy's caravan and notices the petrol tank is lower than it should be. Garcia must have borrowed the caravan to transport his work back and forth to the warehouse. However, Garcia is known to have been under the influence of opium and whiskey at the time so someone must have helped him.

Using the missing petrol levels, Alleyn finds the warehouse in London's Brixton district, despite Valmai's claim the warehouse is in Holloway. There, Alleyn finds the grotesquely disfigured corpse of Garcia who seems to have ingested nitric acid by force. With the help of Inspector Fox and journalist Nigel Bathgate, Alleyn checks everyone's alibis one last time.

In the epilogue, Alleyn explains all to Troy and his mother. Sonia and Garcia conspired to blackmail both Basil Pilgrim and Valmai Seacliff. While Sonia was successful in getting money out of Basil, Valmai refused to pay Garcia. Valmai dressed in Pilgrim's clothes, met with Garcia in the studio on Friday night and secretly watched Garcia place the knife under the throne. She then helped Garcia pack and move his stuff to the London warehouse where she killed him by pouring nitric acid down his throat, burning her hand in the process. She then returned the caravan and headed back to the estate where she was staying without anyone being the wiser. She returned to class on Monday morning and, when the opportunity arose, shoved Sonia onto the knife. Alleyn noted that the other students said Valmai continued to press down on Sonia after she yelled in pain. From their position, it would seem as if Sonia was simply complaining about the pose again but Valmai should have known better. Sonia previously vandalized a portrait Troy did of Valmai and her murder was committed in revenge.

Troy thanks Alleyn for his aid and helping her through the investigation. She tells him that she does not hate him anymore. He tells her that that fills him with enough hope that something may blossom between the two of them.

== Characters ==
- Chief Inspector Roderick Alleyn
- Agatha Troy - a famous painter
- Inspector Fox
- Nigel Bathgate
- Sergeants Bailey and Thompson
- Lady Alleyn - the inspector's mother
- Wolf Garcia - a ne'er-do-well sculptor
- Sonia Gluck - an art model
- Basil Pilgrim - an art student and son of a Methodist peer
- Valmai Seacliff - an art student
- Katti Bostock - a somewhat famous painter; Troy's friend
- Cedric Malmsley - a bearded art student
- Phillida Lee - an art student
- Watt Hatchett - an Australian student
- Francis Ormerin - an art student from France
- Bobbie O'Dawne - Sonia's friend

== Agatha Troy and detective fiction love interests ==
With the notable exception of Agatha Christie, whose Hercule Poirot and Miss Marple did not lend themselves to a 'love interest', in the 1930s the Golden Age crime queens introduced romantic partners for their series detectives. These detectives had begun their fictional careers in the classic bachelor pattern of Sherlock Holmes and Dr Watson. Dorothy L Sayers' Lord Peter Wimsey met Harriet Vane in Strong Poison (1930) and by the final full-length Wimsey novel Busman's Honeymoon (1938), Sayers had married him off and effectively ended his career. Margery Allingham's Albert Campion charted a parallel romantic and matrimonial course through the 1930s, and in Artists In Crime, Ngaio Marsh introduced the painter Agatha Troy, with whom her detective Roderick Alleyn falls in love.

Marsh biographer Margaret Lewis mentions concerns by Marsh's literary agent, Edmund Cork, whose other clients included Agatha Christie, about Alleyn falling in love and marrying; "and contemporary reviewers", writes Lewis, "wondered if he was going to become another Lord Peter Wimsey." Lewis reflects that the introductory "description in Artists In Crime of the tall figure of Troy, with her short, dark hair, thin face and hands, absent-minded, shy and funny, seems very close to the Ngaio Marsh who absorbed that scene [the wharf at Suva] on the way back to New Zealand in 1932 and who had then been painting seriously for over ten years."

== Television series ==
A television episode in 1968 had Michael Allinson in the lead role.

The novel was televised in 1990 as the pilot for the BBC TV series The Inspector Alleyn Mysteries, starring Simon Williams as Inspector Alleyn.
