= A Man Lay Dead =

1934 detective novel by Ngaio Marsh

- First edition
- Author: Ngaio Marsh
- Language: English
- Series: Roderick Alleyn
- Genre: Detective fiction
- Publisher: Geoffrey Bles
- Publication date: 1934
- Media type: Print
- Followed by: Enter a Murderer

A Man Lay Dead is a detective novel by Ngaio Marsh; it is the first novel to feature Roderick Alleyn, and was first published in 1934. The plot concerns a murder committed during a detective game of murder at a weekend party in a country house.

There is a side-plot focused on Russians, ancient weapons, and secret societies. The murder concerns a small group of guests at Sir Hubert Handesley's estate. Unlike later novels, this novel focuses more on Nigel Bathgate and less on Alleyn.

== Development ==
A Man Lay Dead was the first novel Marsh had written, although she had written some plays and short stories. In years to come she would "cringe at the thought of her first novel with its barely plausible story line, shallow characterization and confined setting, but it was her entrée to crime fiction writing" and exemplifies the cosy detective novel form with a single main setting (the country house mystery).

Marsh says that she started writing about Alleyn in 1931 when the Murder Game was popular at English weekend parties. After reading a detective story by Christie or Sayers on a wet Saturday afternoon in London she wondered whether she could write something in the genre and bought six exercise books and a pencil at a local stationer's.

== Plot summary ==
Journalist Nigel Bathgate somewhat begrudgingly attends a weekend house party at the estate of Sir Hubert Handesley. Sir Hubert is known for his elaborate murder games. Amongst the other guests are Nigel's womanizing cousin Charles Rankin, Sir Hubert's niece Angela North, Arthur and Marjorie Wilde, Rosamund Grant and Dr. Tokareff, a Russian doctor. Charles shows off a Russian dagger he recently acquired which causes Tokareff to rebuke him. That dagger belongs to a secret Russian brotherhood and is said to bring tragedy to anyone who possess it and is not a member of the brotherhood.

The weekend party is off to a tense start. Rankin makes unwanted passes at the women in attendance. The Wildes argue over their debt, largely collected by Marjorie. Arthur Wilde becomes the brunt of several jokes that culminate with Rankin debagging him in front of several guests. Nigel overhears Mrs. Wilde having an affair with Charles.

Vassily, the Russian butler, begins the murder game by covertly selecting the killer. The killer has roughly a day and a half to tap another guest on the shoulder to "kill" them then ring a gong to signal that the murder has occurred. The other guests must remain still for two minutes to allow the killer to establish an alibi. In the evening, the gong sounds out but when the guests investigate, they find Charles Rankin genuinely murdered with his Russian dagger in his back.

Chief Inspector Roderick Alleyn is called in to investigate. Everyone has some kind of alibi. Charles was murdered on the ground floor while everyone else was upstairs. Arthur Wilde admits to being the killer in the murder game but Nigel, who strikes up a friendship with Alleyn, provides him with an alibi. Wilde then confesses to killing Charles but is unable to provide accurate information as to how he pulled it off. Alleyn speculates Wilde is covering for his wife.

There are few clues to aid Alleyn. The dagger lacks fingermarks and the staff saw no one come downstairs. Alleyn discovers a partially charred glove in the fireplace that belongs to Mrs. Wilde who claims the glove went missing earlier. No one seems to have a satisfying motive. Nigel inherits Rankin's estate while Sir Hubert inherits the dagger. Wilde also receives a small inheritance. Alleyn begins to consider the possibility Rankin's murder may be connected to a murder in London associated with Russian Communists. However, this turns out to be a dead end.

In the denouement, Alleyn reveals all. Arthur Wilde murdered Charles Rankin. His confession was simply a misdirect to clear his name. The Wildes were heavily in debt and needed the small but sufficient inheritance Charles left. Wilde created an alibi for himself by talking to Nigel through their shared bathroom door. Wilde turned on the bathtub then ran into the hallway through the door in his bedroom. To save time, he slid down the banister and stabbed Charles on the way down. In under a minute, Wilde was back in the bathtub, talking to Nigel through the latter's connecting door. Although Nigel provided Wilde with an alibi, only Nigel was doing the talking.

The novel ends with Nigel, now a rich man, free to pursue the heart of Angela North.

== Characters ==
- Chief Inspector Roderick Alleyn
- Nigel Bathgate - a young journalist
- Sir Hubert Handesley - host of the weekend party
- Charles Rankin - Nigel's wealthy cousin
- Angela North - Sir Hubert's young, attractive niece
- Arthur Wilde - a friend of Sir Hubert
- Marjorie Wilde - Arthur's wife
- Rosamund Grant - a former love interest of Charles'
- Dr. Tokareff - a Russian
- Vassily - Sir Hubert's Russian butler

== Reception ==
The Illustrated London News, reviewing the novel in 1934, wrote:

"A Man Lay Dead," by Ngaio Marsh, imports a real murder into the "murder" game. The reconstruction of the crime is ridiculous; sliding down the banisters should have been left to the nursery. The hue-and-cry is good enough, and the author has spared no effort to keep his trailers off the scent as long as possible.

== Television adaptation ==
This novel was adapted for the television series The Inspector Alleyn Mysteries, with the most notable change being that the Angela North character was replaced by Agatha Troy, who appears in later novels as Alleyn's wife.
