= Roderick Alleyn =

Fictional detective

- First appearance: A Man Lay Dead
- Last appearance: Light Thickens
- Created by: Ngaio Marsh

In-universe information
- Gender: Male
- Occupation: Police detective
- Family: Sir George Alleyn (father; deceased); Lady Helena Alleyn (mother); Sir George Alleyn (brother)
- Spouse: Agatha Troy
- Children: Roderick "Ricky" Alleyn
- Relatives: Sarah Alleyn (niece); Christina Alleyn (cousin)
- Nationality: British

Roderick Alleyn (pronounced "Allen") is a fictional character who first appeared in the novel A Man Lay Dead (1934). He is the policeman hero of the 32 detective novels of Ngaio Marsh. Marsh and her gentleman detective belong firmly in the Golden Age of Detective Fiction, although the last Alleyn novel, Light Thickens, was published in 1982.

Marsh mentions in an introduction that she named her detective Alleyn after the Elizabethan actor Edward Alleyn, founder of Dulwich College, where her father had been a pupil. She started a novel with Alleyn in 1931, after reading a detective story by Agatha Christie or Dorothy L. Sayers on a wet Saturday afternoon in London and wondering if she could write something in the genre. So she bought six exercise books and a pencil at a local stationer and started A Man Lay Dead, involving a Murder Game, which was then popular at English weekend parties.

== Background and early life ==
Roderick Alleyn (known as "Rory" to friends) is a gentleman detective, whose family and educational background may be deduced from comments in the novels. In brief, Alleyn was apparently born between 1892 and 1894, graduated from the University of Oxford around 1915, served in the army for three years in World War I, then spent a year (1919–1920) in the British Foreign Service. He finally joined the Metropolitan Police as a constable in about 1920 or 1921.

Marsh's Alleyn novels form a chronological series that follows his detective career. When the series opens (A Man Lay Dead, 1934), Alleyn is aged about 40 and is already a Detective Chief-Inspector in the CID at Scotland Yard.

In the early novels he is described several times as looking like a cross "between a monk and a grandee." He is very tall, dark and good looking; the press have given him the nickname "Handsome Alleyn". He has a habit of quoting Shakespeare, among others. As the series progresses, Alleyn marries and has a son, and eventually rises to the rank of Chief Superintendent.

He spends the years of the Second World War in the antipodes, engaged in counter-espionage work, often under an assumed name. When he returns to England, to his wife, Agatha Troy—and to a murder case—in Final Curtain (1947), Alleyn observes that they have been apart for "three years, seven months and twenty-four days".

=== Family background ===
Throughout the novels, Alleyn is clearly a member of the gentry. He is the younger brother of a baronet, and was raised in Buckinghamshire where his mother, Lady Alleyn, continued to live. Lady Alleyn is unseen until the sixth novel, Artists in Crime (1938). In Surfeit of Lampreys (1941) Alleyn states that his mother's maiden name was Blandish.

From the beginning of the series, Alleyn's father is dead: his older brother, Sir George Alleyn, is already enjoying the baronetcy. Their late father, also named George (Death in a White Tie, 1938) implicitly had at least one brother (Alleyn's paternal uncle), because the first novel (A Man Lay Dead, 1934) mentions a cousin, Christina Alleyn, who remains an unseen character. Christina is a chemist who trained at Newnham College, Cambridge. In 1934, Christina Alleyn is in her mid-twenties.

Alleyn is on tolerably good terms with his older brother, Sir George Alleyn, the current baronet, who throughout most of the series is an unseen character. In Artists in Crime (1938), their mother indicates that Sir George is more conventional and less intelligent than his detective younger brother. The novel Death in a White Tie features Sarah Alleyn, a daughter of Sir George, and mentions that Sir George's wife (Alleyn's sister-in-law) is named Grace and that the elder Lady Alleyn is called Helena (at least, she is addressed as such by Lady Lorrimer). Like his younger brother, Sir George entered the Foreign Service: Death in a White Tie implies that Sir George is the Governor of Fiji in the late 1930s, as he writes to Alleyn from Government House in Suva. In the much later novel, When in Rome (1970), Alleyn remarks that his older brother was once the British Ambassador there. Sir George finally appears in person, but only briefly, at an embassy function in Black As He's Painted (1974).

In the earliest five novels, Alleyn is single—and quite attracted to actresses, as described in both Enter a Murderer (1935) and Vintage Murder (1937). In Artists in Crime (1938), Alleyn meets renowned painter Agatha Troy on a ship leaving Fiji and again back in England after a model is murdered in Troy's studio. During the investigation he "loses his heart" but Troy cannot, at first, return his love. She finally accepts his proposal in the penultimate scene in Death in a White Tie (1938).

Troy is a famous painter, particularly of portraits, and features in many later novels either in person or in the letters Alleyn writes to her. According to one of a series of letters in Overture to Death (1939), their marriage was planned for April the following year. The actual event takes place "off stage", as does the birth of their son, also named Roderick but generally called Ricky; Ricky plays major roles as a six-year old child in Spinsters in Jeopardy (1954) and as a young adult in Last Ditch (1977).

=== Birth, education and early career ===
Alleyn was reportedly educated at Eton and Oxford, and worked in the Foreign Service for a year (1919–1920) before joining the Metropolitan Police. In Vintage Murder, Alleyn tells his New Zealand colleagues that his first beat was in Poplar, London. A much later novel, Scales of Justice (1955), gives sketchy details of this period in Alleyn's life. The reasons for the switch in careers are never made explicit.

Early in his police career, Alleyn wrote a textbook that became widely admired: Principles and Practice of Criminal Investigations, by Roderick Alleyn, M.A. (Oxon), C.I.D. (Sable and Murgatroyd, 21s), which is mentioned in a footnote to Chapter 6 of Vintage Murder (1937).

In the first few novels, Alleyn is in his early forties. In the first, A Man Lay Dead (1934), Nigel Bathgate (Alleyn's future Watson) is clearly stated to be twenty-five, and Alleyn is much older, judging by the tone of his remarks to Bathgate. In the second, Enter a Murderer (1935), there is a minor inconsistency, in that Bathgate appears to be slightly younger than before. Bathgate says that he has been working as a journalist for only 15 months, ever since he 'came down' (that is, graduated) from Trinity College, Cambridge. However, Alleyn comments that it is almost 20 years since he (Alleyn) came down from Oxford. Assuming both gentlemen graduated with a typical three-year Oxbridge degree at around age 21, then in 1934 or 1935 Bathgate is about 22 or 23 and Alleyn is about 20 years older, indicating his birth was around 1893 or 1894.

The fifth novel, Vintage Murder (1937), is explicitly set in New Zealand in June 1936—according to an epilogue dated September 1936 and set three months after the novel's action. In Chapter 16, Alleyn states his age, while speaking to a teenager: 'Rude you think? I'm twenty-five years older than you. Old gentlemen of forty-two are allowed to be impertinent. Especially when they are policemen.'

Vintage Murder also indicates Alleyn spent three years in the army after graduating, presumably during World War I. Nowhere in the series are details of this military service ever given. Immediately after the army, he spent a year in the Foreign Service.

The sixth novel, Artists in Crime (1938), rapidly follows the action of Vintage Murder (that is, occurs in late 1936), and contains letters between Lady Alleyn and her younger son during his return to England. These show that Alleyn's mother turns 65 in 1936, and that Alleyn is about 20 years younger. The same correspondence shows that Lady Alleyn's birthday is on the seventh of September, and that Alleyn's (forty-third) birthday follows soon after. Hence, from information in the fifth and sixth novels, Alleyn was probably born in September or October, 1893.

It is clear that later novels take some liberties with Alleyn's age. In Black as He's Painted (1974), Alleyn is clearly not 80 years old, as he would have to be if his birth was in 1893. The setting of the novel is identified as being contemporary with its writing, i.e. the early 1970s, and while Alleyn is clearly a senior member of CID, he is still relatively young and fit enough to be "sprinting" down alleyways after perpetrators.

== The Alleyn canon ==
The following descriptions are taken with acknowledgment from the rear cover blurbs on the Harper Collins Diamond Anniversary Collection of 2009.

- A Man Lay Dead (1934)
  Sir Hubert Handesley's extravagant weekend house-parties are deservedly famous for his exciting Murder Game. But when the lights go up this time, there is a real corpse with a real dagger in the back. All seven suspects have skilful alibis - so Chief Detective Inspector Roderick Alleyn has to figure out the whodunit.
- Enter a Murderer (1935)
  The crime scene was the stage of the Unicorn Theatre, when a prop gun fired a very real bullet; the victim was an actor clawing his way to stardom using bribery instead of talent; and the suspects included two unwilling girlfriends and several relieved blackmail victims. The stage is set for one of Roderick Alleyn's most baffling cases.
- The Nursing Home Murder (1935)
  A Harley Street surgeon and his attractive nurse are almost too nervous to operate. Their patient is the Home Secretary - and they both have very good personal reasons to want him dead. The operation is a complete success - but he dies within hours, and Inspector Alleyn must find out why.
- Death in Ecstasy (1936)
  Who slipped cyanide into the ceremonial wine of ecstasy at the House of the Sacred Flame? The other initiates and the High Priest claim to be above earthy passions. But Roderick Alleyn discovers that the victim had provoked lust and jealousy, and he suspects that more evil still lurks behind the Sign of the Sacred Flame.
- Vintage Murder (1937)
  New Zealand theatrical manager Alfred Meyer is planning a surprise for his wife's birthday - a jeroboam of champagne descending gently onto the stage after the performance. But, as Roderick Alleyn witnesses, something goes horribly wrong. Is the death the product of Maori superstitions - or something more down to earth?
- Artists in Crime (1938)
  It starts as an art exercise - the knife under the drape, the pose outlined in chalk. But when Agatha Troy returns to her class, the scene has been re-enacted: the model is dead, fixed in the most dramatic pose Troy has ever seen. It's a difficult case for Chief Detective Inspector Alleyn. Is the woman he loves really a murderess?
- Death in a White Tie (1938)
  The Season has begun. Débutantes and chaperones are planning their gala dinners - and the blackmailer is planning strategies to stalk his next victim. Chief Detective Inspector Roderick Alleyn knows that something is up and has already planted his friend Lord Robert Gospell at the dinner, but someone else has got there first.
- Overture to Death (1939)
  It was planned as an act of charity: a new piano for the parish hall, and an amusing evening's entertainment to finance the gift. But all is doomed when Miss Campanula sits down to play. A chord is struck, a shot rings out, and Miss Campanula is dead. It seems to be a case of sinister infatuation for Roderick Alleyn .
- Death at the Bar (1940)
  A midsummer evening - darts night at the Plume of Feathers, a traditional Devonshire public house. A distinguished painter, a celebrated actor, a woman graduate, a plump lady from County Clare and a local farmer all play their parts in a fatal experiment which calls for the investigative expertise of Inspector Alleyn.
- Surfeit of Lampreys (1941), published in USA as Death of a Peer
  The Lampreys were a peculiar family. They entertained their guests with charades - like rich Uncle Gabriel, who was always such a bore. The Lampreys thought if they jollied him up he would bail them out of poverty again. But Uncle Gabriel meets a violent end, and Chief Inspector Alleyn has to work out who in the household killed him.
- Death and the Dancing Footman (1942)
  It begins as an entertainment. Eight people, many of them adversaries, gathered for a winter weekend by a host with a love for theatre. It ends in snowbound disaster. Everyone has an alibi - and a motive as well. But Roderick Alleyn soon realizes that it all hangs on Thomas, the dancing footman.
- Colour Scheme (1943)
  It was a horrible death - lured into a pool of boiling mud and left to die. Roderick Alleyn, far from home on a wartime quest for enemy agents, knows that any number of people could have killed him: the English exiles he'd hated, the New Zealanders he'd despised, or the Maoris he'd insulted. Even the spies he'd thwarted.
- Died in the Wool (1945)
  One summer evening in 1942 Flossie Rubrick, MP, one of the most formidable women in New Zealand, goes to her husband's wool shed to rehearse a patriotic speech - and disappears. Three weeks later she turns up at an auction - packed inside one of her own bales of wool and very, very dead .
- Final Curtain (1947)
  Just as Agatha Troy, the world famous painter, completes her portrait of Sir Henry Ancred, the Grand Old Man of the stage, the old actor dies. The dramatic circumstances of his death are such that Scotland Yard is called in - in the person of Troy's long-absent husband, Chief Detective Inspector Roderick Alleyn.
- Swing Brother Swing (1949), published in USA as A Wreath for Rivera
  The music rises to a climax, Lord Pastern aims his revolver and fires. The figure in the spotlight falls - and the coup-de-théatre has become murder ... Has the eccentric peer let hatred of his future son-in-law go too far? Or will a tangle of jealousies and blackmail reveal to Inspector Alleyn an altogether different murderer?
- Opening Night (1951), published in USA as Night at the Vulcan
  Dreams of stardom lured Martyn Tarne from faraway New Zealand to a soul-destroying round of West End agents and managers in search of work. Now, driven by sheer necessity, she accepts the humble job of dresser to the Vulcan Theatre's leading lady. But the eagerly awaited opening night brings a strange turn of the wheel of fortune - and sudden unforeseen death.
- Spinsters in Jeopardy (1954), published in the US in 1953 and later in an abridged version as The Bride of Death (1955)
  High in the mountains stands an historic Saracen fortress, home of the mysterious Mr Oberon, leader of a coven of witches. Roderick Alleyn, on holiday with his family, suspects that a huge drugs ring operates from within the castle. When someone else stumbles upon the secret, Mr Oberon decides his strange rituals require a human sacrifice.
- Scales of Justice (1955)
  The inhabitants of Swevenings are stirred only by a fierce competition to catch a monster trout known to dwell in their beautiful stream. Then one of their small community is found brutally murdered; beside him is their freshly killed trout. Chief Detective Inspector Roderick Alleyn's murder investigation seems to be much more interested in the fish.
- Off With His Head (1957), published in USA as Death of a Fool
  When the pesky Anna Bünz arrives at Mardian to investigate local folk-dancing, she quickly antagonizes the villagers. But Mrs Bünz is not the only source of friction. When the sword dancers' traditional mock beheading of the Winter Solstice becomes horribly real, Superintendent Roderick Alleyn finds himself faced with a complex case of gruesome proportions.
- Singing in the Shrouds (1959)
  On a cold February London night the police find a corpse on the quayside, covered with flower petals and pearls. The killer, who walked away singing, is known to be one of nine passengers on the cargo ship, Cape Farewell. Superintendent Roderick Alleyn joins the ship on the most difficult assignment of his career.
- False Scent (1960)
  Mary Bellamy, darling of the London stage, holds a 50th birthday party, a gala for everyone who loves her and fears her power. Then someone uses a deadly insect spray on Mary instead of the azaleas. The suspects, all very theatrically, are playing the part of mourners. Superintendent Alleyn has to find out which one played the murderer.
- Hand in Glove (1962)
  The April Fool's Day was a roaring success for all, it seemed - except for poor Mr Cartell who ended up in the ditch - for ever. Then there was the case of Mr Percival Pyke Period's letter of condolence, sent before the body was found - not to mention the family squabbles. It's all a puzzling crime for Superintendent Alleyn.
- Dead Water (1964)
  Times are good in the Cornish village of Portcarrow, as hundreds flock to taste the healing waters of Pixie Falls. When Miss Emily Pride inherits this celebrated land, she wants to put an end to the villagers' exploitation of miracle cures, especially Miss Elspeth Cost's gift shop. But someone puts an end to Miss Cost, and Roderick Alleyn finds himself literally on the spot.
- Death at the Dolphin (1967), published in USA as Killer Dolphin
  The bombed-out Dolphin Theatre is given to Peregrine Jay by a mysterious oil millionaire, who also gives him a glove that belonged to Shakespeare to display in the dockside theatre. But then a murder takes place, a boy is attacked, and the glove is stolen. Inspector Roderick Alleyn doesn't think oil and water are a good mix.
- Clutch of Constables (1968)
  According to Chief Superintendent Roderick Alleyn, 'the Jampot' is an international crook who regards murder as 'tiresome and regrettable necessities'. But Alleyn's wife Troy has shared close quarters with the Jampot on a pleasure cruise along the peaceful rivers of 'Constable country' and knows something is badly wrong even before the two murders on board.
- When in Rome (1970)
  When their guide disappears mysteriously in the depths of a Roman Basilica, the members of Sebastian Mailer's tour group seem strangely unperturbed. But when a body is discovered in an Etruscan sarcophagus, Superintendent Alleyn, in Rome on the trail of an international drug racket, is very much concerned.
- Tied Up in Tinsel (1972)
  When a much disliked visiting servant disappears without trace after playing Santa Claus, foul play is at once suspected - only suspicion falls not on the staff but on the unimpeachably respectable guests. When Superintendent Roderick Alleyn returns unexpectedly from a trip overseas, it is to find his beloved wife in the thick of an intriguing mystery.
- Black As He's Painted (1974)
  Called in to help with security arrangements for a presidential reception at a London embassy, Chief Superintendent Alleyn ensures the house and grounds are stiff with police. Nevertheless, an assassin strikes, and Alleyn finds no shortage of help, from Special Branch to a tribal court - and a small black cat named Lucy Lockett.
- Last Ditch (1977)
  Young Rickie Alleyn has come to the Channel Islands to write, but village life seems tedious - until he finds the stablehand in a ditch, dead from an unlucky jump. But Rickie notices something strange and his father, Chief Superintendent Roderick Alleyn, is discreetly summoned to the scene, when Rickie disappears.
- Grave Mistake (1978)
  With two husbands dead, a daughter marrying the wrong man and a debilitating disease, it is no wonder that Sybil Foster took her own life. But Chief Superintendent Roderick Alleyn doesn't believe she was the type to kill herself - and he thinks someone else has made a very grave mistake.
- Photo Finish (1980)
  The luxury mansion on the shore of New Zealand's Lake Waihoe is the ideal place for a world-famous soprano to rest after her triumphant tour. Among the guests are Chief Superintendent Alleyn and his wife - but theirs is not a social visit. When tragedy strikes, and isolated by one of the lake's sudden storms, Alleyn faces one of his trickiest cases.
- Light Thickens (1982)
  Peregrine Jay, owner of the Dolphin Theatre, is putting on a magnificent production of Macbeth, the play that, superstition says, always brings bad luck. But one night the claymore swings and the dummy's head is more than real: murder behind the scenes. Luckily, Chief Superintendent Roderick Alleyn is in the audience.

There is also Money in the Morgue, a manuscript started by Marsh and completed by Stella Duffy in 2018.

In addition, three Alleyn stories are contained in the short story collection Death on the Air and Other Stories, first published in Great Britain by HarperCollins Publishers in 1995. The three Alleyn stories are:

- Death on the Air (1936)
- I Can Find My Way Out (1946 - USA)
- Chapter and Verse: The Little Copplestone Mystery (1974 - USA)

The collection, besides seven non-Alleyn stories, also includes two "biographical" essays written by Ngaio Marsh: "Roderick Alleyn" and "Portrait of Troy".

The script of a television play by Ngaio Marsh, A Knotty Problem, which features Alleyn and is set in New Zealand, appears in the anthology Bodies from the Library 3 (Collins Crime Club, 2020).

A fourth Alleyn story, Boots, previously unpublished, appears in the anthology Bodies from the Library 4 (Collins Crime Club, 2021).

== Adaptations ==
=== Television ===
Several of the Roderick Alleyn novels have been adapted for television, though none as yet for mainstream cinema release. Two novels were adapted as episodes for the 1960s BBC anthology series Detective; Death in Ecstasy in 1964 with Geoffrey Keen as Alleyn, and Artists in Crime in 1968 with Michael Allinson as Alleyn.

Four novels were adapted for New Zealand television in 1977 under the series title Ngaio Marsh Theatre, with Alleyn played by George Baker. Colour Scheme, Died in the Wool and Vintage Murder are set in New Zealand, while Opening Night is set in London. The theme of Opening Night involves a New Zealand actress with a startling resemblance to the lead actor.

Nine novels with British settings were adapted for British television as The Inspector Alleyn Mysteries. In the pilot, Artists in Crime (1990), Alleyn was played by Simon Williams, and then by Patrick Malahide in eight more tales (1993–94): A Man Lay Dead, The Nursing Home Murder, Final Curtain (the second TV adaptation), Death at the Bar, Death in a White Tie, Hand in Glove, Dead Water and Scales of Justice.

=== BBC Radio ===
Death in Ecstasy was adapted for Saturday Night Theatre in 1969. Peter Howell portrayed Alleyn, with his name being pronounced "Al-lain". A 1986 dramatisation of Death and the Dancing Footman starred Nigel Graham.

A series of adaptations were made starring Jeremy Clyde as Alleyn. Four stories were recorded between 2001 and 2006; A Man Lay Dead (2001), A Surfeit of Lampreys (2001), When in Rome (2003), and Opening Night (2006)

== DVD release ==
The Inspector Alleyn Mysteries (the 1990s British productions) are available on Region Two DVD as a four disc pack.
