= Death in a White Tie =

1938 novel by Ngaio Marsh

- First edition
- Author: Ngaio Marsh
- Language: English
- Series: Roderick Alleyn
- Genre: Detective fiction
- Publisher: Geoffrey Bles
- Publication date: 1938
- Media type: Print
- Preceded by: Artists in Crime
- Followed by: Overture to Death

Death in a White Tie is a detective novel by Ngaio Marsh. It is the seventh novel to feature Roderick Alleyn, and was first published in 1938. The plot concerns the murder of a British lord after a party.

== Plot summary ==
Chief Inspector Roderick Alleyn is on the hunt for a blackmailer. Mrs. Halcut-Hackett tells Alleyn about her "friend" who is being blackmailed and has been instructed to leave a purse full of money in a sofa at a concert hall. Alleyn enlists his friend, the popular and charming Lord Robert "Bunchy" Gospell, to investigate the case. At the concert, Bunchy, pretending to be asleep, spots the distinctive hand of the blackmailer. He identifies the hand as belonging to Dmitri, a well-regarded caterer for London's elites.

Evelyn, Lady Carrados, throws a debutante ball for her daughter from her first marriage, Bridget O'Brien, with many of London's elite in attendance including painter Agatha Troy, Alleyn's mother and niece, physician Sir Daniel Davidson, Bunchy, and the Halcut-Hacketts. The affair is catered by Dmitri. Lady Carrados is also being blackmailed and is instructed to leave a purse full of money in the upstairs sitting room. She does so and, much to her horror, Bridget returns the bag to her believing she left it behind by mistake. Bunchy warns Lady Carrados not to return the bag but she does. Dmitri returns the empty bag to her later in the evening.

Bunchy telephones Alleyn at Scotland Yard to update him on what he witnessed. A furious Bunchy confirms it's the "cakes-and-ale feller" and that he "might as well mix his damn' brews with poison". Someone interrupts the phone call at the moment and Bunchy hangs up. After the party, Bunchy takes a cab to Scotland Yard but is murdered along the way. The cab driver said he picked up Bunchy and another person, probably a man, but the other man got out earlier. Alleyn suspects Bunchy was stunned by a blow to the head then suffocated with his now-missing cloak.

Alleyn attempts to determine who walked in on Bunchy's phone call as that person must know Bunchy is on the path of the blackmailer. However, Dmitri has a solid alibi enforced by Sir Herbert Carrados and others. Alleyn investigates Donald Potter, Bunchy's nephew and heir who is heavily indebted to a Captain Withers who runs an illegal gambling den. But that leads to nothing but dead ends.

Alleyn has mild successes from Mrs. Halcut-Hackett and Lady Carrados about their blackmail letters. Mrs. Halcut-Hackett is having an affair with Captain Withers and Lady Carrados was never legally married to her first husband Paddy. Paddy had a wife in an Australian insane asylum and thus could not divorce her. Paddy and Evelyn pretended to be married and had Bridget. Paddy died in a car accident apparently with a letter in his pocket about his wife's passing. The letter went missing nearly eighteen years earlier.

Bridget tells Alleyn about an antique desk in her home that has a secret compartment. One evening, she found the compartment and a letter inside it. She did not read the letter, but her stepfather was furious and injured her arm, an act witnessed by Sir Daniel who treated the wound. Alleyn and Fox located the vicarage who tended to Paddy for he was transported to the hospital. The retired vicar and his wife tell them they found the letter and had their niece forward the letter to the hospital. The niece is Violet Harris who was recently hired as Lady Carrados' secretary. Miss Harris said she gave the letter to a man in a car who is actually Sir Herbert Carrados who drove Evelyn to the hospital.

Sir Herbert kept the letter all these years to use against his wife who never loved him as much as she loved Paddy. However, Sir Herbert is innocent of murder. The actual murderer is Sir Daniel Davidson. Davidson was in the blackmailing scheme with Dmitri. As a physician, he had access to many people's secrets which he used to blackmail them. Dmitri was the one to collect the money and do the leg work. Bunchy did not know of Davidson's involvement in the scheme. However Bunchy mentioned "mixing his brews with poison", Sir Daniel panicked believing Bunchy was actually referencing the physician's liquid medicine and not the caterer's cocktails. He followed Bunchy out of the party, stunned him with the cigarette case and suffocated him with his cloak which he then mailed to a hospital mission in China.

The book concludes with Alleyn and Troy continuing their tense relationship and sharing an awkward kiss and vague plans for the future.

== Adaptation ==
It was adapted for television in a 1993 episode of The Inspector Alleyn Mysteries, a BBC production. The director was John Woods, the screenwriter Ken Jones, and Alleyn was played by Patrick Malahide.
