= Grave Mistake =

1978 detective novel by Ngaio Marsh

- First edition
- Author: Ngaio Marsh
- Language: English
- Series: Roderick Alleyn
- Genre: Detective fiction
- Publisher: Collins Crime Club
- Publication date: 1978
- Media type: Print
- Pages: 278
- ISBN: 0-00-231267-0
- Preceded by: Last Ditch
- Followed by: Photo Finish

Grave Mistake is a detective novel by Ngaio Marsh; it is the thirtieth novel to feature Roderick Alleyn, and was first published in 1978. The plot concerns the supposed suicide of a wealthy widow in a chic rest spa, and involves a rare and famous postage stamp.

== Plot synopsis ==
At a Women's Institute meeting in Quintern Place, the home of The Honorable Sybil Foster, a wealthy widow, the reader meets or hears of the characters who populate the Kentish village of Upper Quintern: Sybil's childhood friend, the West End playwright Verity Preston, their helper Mrs Jim Jobbin and gardener Angus McBride, the vicar, the local doctor and others.

Sybil and Verity both live in houses inherited from their fathers. The "rhythms of life" of this highly traditional, class-structured community are described as having changed little "in spite of war, bombs, crises and inflation" except for the arrival of Nikolas Markos, a suave, exotic multi-millionaire. Markos has bought and refurbished the nearby Mardling Manor. At a dinner party, Markos introduces another outsider, Dr Basil Schramm, newly arrived medical incumbent at Greengages Hotel, a classy, expensive health retreat, where Sybil Foster is a frequent guest.

Verity is disconcerted to recognise Schramm as Basil Smythe, a former medical student of her father's, who had seduced and then dropped her 25 years previously.

The next outsider to arrive is Bruce Gardener, a strapping ex-soldier with an ersatz Scottish persona and accent, whose services as a skilled gardener are in demand following the sudden death of Mr McBride. Claude Carter, Sybil's stepson by her first marriage, an unprepossessing remittance man and petty criminal, is newly returned from Australia with the police on his trail.

Sybil has taken herself off to Greengages, where she receives visits from most of the suspects, including her daughter Prunella, recently engaged to Markos' son Gideon. That evening, Sybil is found dead in her hotel room, apparently having committed suicide with an overdose of barbiturate pills taken in whisky. A final suspect is the hotel's luscious Sister Jackson. She puts Alleyn privately in mind of TV comedian Dick Emery's character 'Mandy'. Sister Jackson is jealous of her lover Basil Schramm's burgeoning intimacy with Sybil.

When Sybil's newly revised will appears, its dispositions prove shockingly unexpected, and the resulting suspicions bring Chief Superintendent Roderick Alleyn to Quintern and Greengages, with his team of Detective-Inspector Fox and Thompson (photography) and Bailey (fingerprints).

In the background lurks the 'Black Alexander', a priceless postage stamp, which disappeared when Sybil's first husband Maurice Carter was killed in a bombed train, returning from Quintern Place to London during the War. Was this treasure on his person when he died, or did he hide it for safety somewhere about Quintern Place? The murderer is

== Reception ==
Newgate Callendar (pseudonym for Harold C Schonberg), writing in The New York Times, found this novel, a traditional mystery featuring the suave Alleyn, to be one popular with fans of Ngaio Marsh, but other readers might find it "just a mite slow‐moving."

== Background ==
Marsh's first biographer, Margaret Lewis suggests that, once again, the author's depiction of Quintern drew on her visits to the Rhodes family, her lifelong friends, in the Kentish village of Birling, quoting Marsh's admission that "Birling has a strong tendency to pop up when least expected" and a letter in which Marsh regrets that "however much I try to discipline myself as to plot and general whodunnitry, I always find myself writing about a set of people in a milieu that, for one reason or another, attracts me. And then... I have to involve them in some crime or other. Does this mean one is a straight novelist manquée?".

Later biographer Joanne Drayton also comments on the struggles Marsh faced with a book she described in a letter to her agent Edmund Cork as having "hung round my neck like the Ancient Mariner's Albatross" and "been interrupted so often by illness".

== Settings of last three novels ==
Set in and around the fictional village of Upper Quintern in England's Weald of Kent, it is the last of Marsh's "cosy" English village mysteries, and was followed by Photo Finish (1980), her final novel set in New Zealand, and Light Thickens (1982), her final novel with a theatrical setting.

== Publication ==
The book was well received and sold well, as the author wrote in 1979 to a friend: "Grave Mistake seems to be beating all records in the U.S.A. It has sold 22,000 copies... & [is] still going strong" (quoted in Joanne Drayton's biography).
