= Hand in Glove (novel) =

1962 detective novel by Ngaio Marsh

- First edition
- Author: Ngaio Marsh
- Language: English
- Series: Roderick Alleyn
- Genre: Detective fiction
- Publisher: Collins Crime Club
- Publication date: 1962
- Media type: Print
- Preceded by: False Scent
- Followed by: Dead Water

Hand in Glove is a detective novel by Ngaio Marsh; it is the twenty-second novel to feature Roderick Alleyn, and was first published in 1962. The story concerns a high-society treasure-hunt party at which a murder takes place.

== Plot ==
The elderly Percival Pyke Period shares his country house with Harold Cartell. Period considers himself an expert on etiquette, particularly letters of condolence.

Cartell argues with his stepson Andrew Bantling, whose inheritance he controls until Andrew's twenty-fifth birthday. Andrew wants to resign his commission and paint professionally; Cartell opposes this.

Several people visit for lunch: Constance Cartell, Harold's unmarried sister; Period's secretary, Nicola Maitland-Mayne; Constance's ward "Moppett" and her boyfriend, Leonard Leiss. Constance dotes on Moppett, but Cartell dislikes her and Leiss. Andrew's mother, Cartell's ex-wife Désirée, visits briefly; she announces she is throwing a party that evening. Period expounds on his favourite subject ("breeding" and "background"). Constance says that people who overemphasize this are hiding something; Cartell says he knows someone who forged their name in a parish register to embellish their ancestry but has never been exposed.

After lunch, Period discovers that Leiss has a criminal record. Noticing his antique gold cigarette-case is missing, he suspects Leiss.

Cartell rows with Désirée about Andrew’s inheritance. He confronts Moppett and Leiss about the cigarette-case, threatening to call the police; he argues with Constance about her infatuation with Moppett, whom she defends blindly.

During Désirée's party, Period complains bitterly to her about Cartell's annoying habits, but she realises that Cartell has seriously upset him in another way which he won’t disclose.

Next morning, Period's manservant hand-delivers Constance a letter consoling her for Cartell's death. Constance rushes to Period's house; news then arrives that Cartell has been found dead in a ditch local workmen have dug outside his house.

Superintendent Alleyn arrives. Someone tampered with the plank-bridge over the ditch so it would collapse when stepped on, then levered a concrete sewer-pipe onto Cartell. Alleyn deduces that Cartell was walking his dog, as he did every night. He sees Period's cigarette-case lying in the trench.

Alleyn interviews Nicola and Andrew. Attracted to each other, they left the party early and sat in his car near the ditch to talk. They saw Moppett and Leiss loitering nearby; Leiss stooped over the ditch at one point. Alleyn asks whether Leiss was wearing gloves, and Nicola describes the chamois ones he wore. Later they witnessed Désirée having a drunken row with Cartell and threatening him.

While Alleyn is visiting Constance, a letter from Period arrives. Constance is shocked: it is identical to the letter about Cartell's death he sent her already, "Before they had found him."

Alleyn interrogates Leiss, who denies stealing the cigarette-case. Alleyn takes Leiss’s overcoat and chamois gloves for testing.

He confronts Period with the two letters. Period is evasive, saying he wrote to Constance privately. Alleyn asks if he knew someone else who had lost a brother: he admits this but won’t identify them. Alleyn notices the family tree on the wall of Period's study.

Alleyn visits Désirée, and asks if Period has sent her a letter recently. Désirée, producing one, suggests it shows that Period has dementia, because it mentions a conversation about his family's antiquity that she doesn't remember. She mentions that her brother died recently: Period has sent his letters to the wrong recipients.

Alleyn visits a local church to examine the register. Period's name has been added underneath that of his supposed twin, dead in infancy, at a later date. Period has adopted the middle name "Pyke" to make it appear he belongs to an extinct gentry family; Cartell had discovered this.

Forensics find multiple traces of Period's tobacco on Leiss's clothes (suggesting he stole the case), but conclude that the person who moved the planks was not wearing Leiss's chamois gloves but heavy driving gloves. Moppett complains to the police that Leiss’s driving gloves are missing.

Period calls Alleyn, saying he has something to disclose, but is knocked out by an intruder. Alleyn finds him unconscious. When he comes to, he rambles about someone whistling Leiss's favourite song outside his window on the night of the murder.

Alleyn feels that if Leiss or Moppett had murdered Cartell they would not have advertised their presence in the lane by whistling, or that Désirée would have done this by shouting. Leiss's missing gloves are recovered and a bloodstain on them matches a wound on Constance's hand. She killed her brother, and attempted to kill Period, to keep Moppett from jail. Constance breaks down when presented with the evidence.

== Background ==
Marsh wrote much of the book on a cruise across the Pacific in 1960. As she worked on it, she found it becoming "a kind of comedy of manners with very little crime"; similarly, she said in an interview, "male snobs have always fascinated me. It is a book I would have liked to have written without killing anybody". Towards the end of her life she confessed that Percival Pyke Period was among her own favourites of the characters she had written.

== Reception ==
Anthony Boucher, reviewing in The New York Times, felt that though "highly readable and entertaining" the novel was not Marsh's best: "The genteel dissection of levels of snobbery in the English country gentry is, to me at least, less interesting than her usual themes, and Superintendent Roderick Alleyn has handled more cleanly defined murder puzzles. But even minor Marsh is an evening of perfectly polished professionalism."

Jacques Barzun was likewise disappointed, calling the book "pleasant enough; there is clarity and humor; but the people and the props are a bit tired, especially Roderick Alleyn, who may be said to mumble his way from clue to clue around the countryside".

British reviewers were more positive. Julian Symons in The Sunday Times called Hand in Glove "neat, dexterous... Miss Marsh's freshest and most enjoyable performance for years". In a capsule review for The Sunday Telegraph, Cecil Day-Lewis under his crime-fiction pseudonym "Nicholas Blake" summed the book up as "Clever and cosy." Francis Iles in The Guardian called it "Light, entertaining and disastrously readable: that is, if you have anything else you ought to be doing", praising the "easy, natural dialogue and gentle humour". The Illustrated London News called it a return to form: "This latest production is, if not quite in the first class, very well up to standard."

Like Boucher, Marsh scholar Kathryne Slate McDorman sees snobbery and class distinctions as a major theme of the book, noting that even Period's servants are particularly conservative. Bruce Harding similarly calls it "a civilized and witty send-up of a male English snob and the class insecurities that beset Britain", though he does comment that Andrew and Nicola's courtship "seems oddly Edwardian in the racy 1960s".

== Recordings and Adaptations ==
In 1987, Jeremy Sinden recorded an audiobook of the novel for Chivers Audio.

BBC One broadcast an adaptation for the television series The Inspector Alleyn Mysteries, with John Gielgud guest-starring, on 11 January 1994. The adaptation inserts Alleyn's wife Agatha Troy into the plot as a sleuth and has her surviving an attempt on her life.

== Bibliography ==
- Harding, Bruce (2019). Ngaio Marsh: A Companion to the Mystery Fiction. Jefferson, North Carolina: McFarland & Company. ISBN 978-0-7864-6032-8.
- McDorman, Kathryne Slate (1991). Ngaio Marsh. Boston: Twayne. ISBN 0-8057-6999-4.
