= Clutch of Constables =

1968 novel by Ngaio Marsh

- First edition
- Author: Ngaio Marsh
- Language: English
- Series: Roderick Alleyn
- Genre: Detective fiction
- Publisher: Collins Crime Club
- Publication date: 1968
- Media type: Print
- Preceded by: Death at the Dolphin
- Followed by: When in Rome

Clutch of Constables is a detective novel by Ngaio Marsh; it is the twenty-fifth novel to feature Roderick Alleyn, and was first published in 1968. The plot concerns art forgery, and takes place on a cruise on a fictional river in the Norfolk Broads; the "Constable" referred to in the title is John Constable, whose works are mentioned by several characters.

== Plot summary ==
Roderick Alleyn gives a guest lecture at a police college. His subject is the recent capture of Foljambe, alias 'The Jampot', an international criminal specialising in drug smuggling and art fraud. The case demonstrated Foljambe's phenomenal gift for disguise and willingness to kill, and gained interest from the presence of Alleyn's wife, celebrity painter Agatha Troy, on the river cruise where the action unfolded. The novel alternates between Alleyn's narrative and flashbacks about Troy's experiences.

Wanting a vacation after the launch of her latest solo exhibition, Troy impulsively takes a berth on the MV Zodiac for a tour of East Anglia. Her remark about the passing views being "a clutch of Constables" (i.e., resembling landscapes painted by John Constable) creates an odd atmosphere of nervousness among her fellow passengers, as if someone is dreading the appearance of police constables on the shore.

These passengers are the usual assorted bunch of suspects, when the murder takes place of Hazel Rickerby-Carrick her Fabergé, jewelled zodiac ornament, is found to be missing.

The passengers, all suspects, include: a literary lepidopterist clearly much smitten by Troy, a pair of gushing American tourists in search of antiques, a sporting Australian clergyman, a London slum landlord with a talent for fine graphics and, finally, a grandly exotic and distinguished surgeon of Afro-European origin, to whom Troy is greatly attracted, and who is the subject of overt racism from several of the passengers.

The plot develops around a conspiracy to plant fake Constable paintings in the international art market, and, Alleyn arrives hot-foot to protect his wife, solve the crime, unmask and arrest 'The Jampot'

== Reception ==
Maurice Richardson wrote in The Observer, "It may not be Miss Marsh’s best but it’s got all that zest of hers like a hot cross bun which keeps you reading." The Illustrated London News took the same tone: "Miss Marsh has captured the ambience of life on an 'inshore liner' with her usual flair... I enjoyed the story. It has an inventive, pacey plot with an unusual setting and some nicely nasty suspects."

== Themes ==
Dr. Natouche belongs in a series of the author's sympathetically portrayed, grandly classy victims of racism in her novels (cf Vintage Murder, Colour Scheme, Black As He's Painted and her final novel Light Thickens). It is interesting how often Marsh makes Alleyn or Troy strongly attracted to them.
