= Enter a Murderer =

1935 novel by Ngaio Marsh

- First edition
- Author: Ngaio Marsh
- Language: English
- Series: Roderick Alleyn
- Genre: Detective fiction, Theatre-fiction
- Publisher: Geoffrey Bles
- Publication date: 1935
- Media type: Print
- Preceded by: A Man Lay Dead
- Followed by: The Nursing Home Murder

Enter a Murderer is a detective novel by Ngaio Marsh. This is her second novel to feature Chief Inspector Roderick Alleyn, and was first published in 1935. The novel is the first of the theatrical novels for which Marsh was to become famous, taking its title from a line of stage direction in Macbeth. The plot concerns the on-stage murder of an actor who has managed to antagonize nearly every member of the cast and crew. By chance, Inspector Alleyn is in the audience.

This novel marks the first appearance of Alleyn's sidekick, Inspector Fox. The book has been praised for its realistic setting in the theatre and dramatic themes.

== Plot summary ==
Journalist Nigel Bathgate accompanies his friend Chief Inspector Roderick Alleyn to a production of "The Rat and the Beaver" at the Unicorn Theatre. The star of the show is Felix Gardener, a friend of Nigel's, who plays the titular Rat. The production is fantastic, and Alleyn and Bathgate's eyes are glued to the stage. In the climactic scene, the Rat makes a dramatic entrance and shoots the Beaver, played by Arthur Surbonadier. The Beaver stares angrily at the Rat and drops dead. Only, this is not part of the show. Surbonadier really is dead, having been killed because the prop bullets in the Rat's gun were secretly replaced by real ones.

Alleyn takes control of the investigation and learns nearly everyone in the cast hated Surbonadier. He fought with Gardener about several things, most importantly actress Stephanie Vaughn. The prop bullets were stored in a desk and must have been switched when the lights went out before the play began. Everybody seems to have an alibi. A pair of grey woolen gloves are found, smeared with stage makeup. The prop bullets have a similar substance on them. Alleyn learns very little from his interviews but suspects that Props, the prop manager, knows more than he lets on.

Alleyn, aided by Bathgate and Inspector Fox, begins to look into Surbonadier's personal life. The actor's uncle, Jacob Saint, owns the Unicorn and was once the target of a libelous accusation of being involved in a drug smuggling ring. The letter was allegedly written by a journalist named Edward Wakeford, but many people believe Arthur wrote it himself as an attempt to blackmail his wealthy uncle. When Alleyn searches the actor's flat, he finds a what looks like a sheet of paper used to practice forging Wakeford's signature. Alleyn arrests Saint, but is coy publicly about what the exact charges are.

Alleyn asks for a recreation of everyone's movements backstage before the play began. The night before the recreation is to take place, Alleyn finds Props dead at the theatre. Although it looks like suicide, Alleyn knows it is yet another murder; he uses the reaction from his prime suspect Felix Gardener to the discovery of the body, to prove that Gardener was the killer.

== Characters ==
- Chief Inspector Roderick Alleyn
- Nigel Bathgate – journalist and friend of Alleyn
- Inspector Fox – Alleyn's colleague
- Arthur Surbonadier – an actor who plays the Beaver; in love with Stephanie Vaughn
- Jacob Saint – owner of the Unicorn Theatre; Arthur's uncle; dating Janet Emerald
- Felix Gardener – Nigel's friend, an actor who plays the Rat; secretly engaged to marry Stephanie Vaughn
- Stephanie Vaughn – a stage actress who plays the Rat's lover; secretly engaged to marry Felix Gardener
- J. Barclay Cramer – a veteran stage actor who plays the butler; he lost a better part to Arthur
- Dulcie Deamer – a young actress
- Susan Max – a veteran stage actress
- Albert "Props" Hickson – the prop master, who has shell shock; engaged to marry Trixie Beadle
- Janet Emerald – an actress who plays the Beaver's mistress; Saint's girlfriend
- George Simpson – the stage manager
- Bill Beadle – dresser, father of Trixie Beadle
- Trixie Beadle – dresser, daughter of Bill Beadle; engaged to marry Props
- Old Blair – stage doorkeeper

== Reception ==
The magazine Truth, reviewing the novel in 1935, wrote:

a bewildering and complicated puzzle. ... For a change - a welcome change - the author has given the conventional formula the go-by. More this that, I must not spoil an extremely ingenious and well-constructed detective problem by disclosing.
