= Last Ditch =

1977 detective novel by Ngaio Marsh

- First edition
- Author: Ngaio Marsh
- Language: English
- Series: Roderick Alleyn
- Genre: Detective fiction
- Publisher: Collins Crime Club
- Publication date: 1977
- Media type: Print
- Pages: 277
- ISBN: 0-00-231475-4
- Preceded by: Black As He's Painted
- Followed by: Grave Mistake

Last Ditch is a detective novel by Ngaio Marsh; it is the twenty-ninth novel to feature Roderick Alleyn, and was first published in 1977. The plot concerns drug smuggling in the Channel Islands, and features Alleyn's son, Ricky, in a central role.

== Plot summary ==
Ricky Alleyn is writing a novel in a rented room in the Channel Islands off Normandy. He makes friends on the small island, and explores the places new to him. He writes long letters home, sharing his experiences with his parents. The couple Julia and Jasper invite him to join their group riding horses, rented for the day from Leathers, the local riding stables. After a good ride, they return to the stables, finding their own horses sensing trouble. Julia sees the trouble and calls Ricky over to look, sending the rest of her party to return the horses to their barn. Both are upset by the sight of a body at the blackthorn hedge, lying in a ditch.

The owner’s niece Dulcie has taken a horse, a sorrel mare, out to jump a blackthorn hedge near Leathers. Her uncle had a fierce argument with her not to try that jump. She dies in the attempt, now a horrid sight from her injuries, and the horse is injured. Mr Harkness is ranting about her sins, and about Sydney Jones, who failed to take that horse away for a new shoe. Harkness is aware of her death and taking no action. Jasper telephones for a doctor, ambulance, and a veterinarian.

Ricky, along with others, examines the place of the jump after Dulcie’s body is removed, noticing many details of the scene, including a fence running through the hedge and pieces of wire. The police sergeant asks questions of the riding party, after he has closely examined the site himself.

The inquest is adjourned at the request of the local police. The local superintendent suffers a burst appendix, prompting him to ask for assistance from Scotland Yard, which sends out Ricky’s father. Alleyn has been investigating illegal drug traffic, specifically heroin, across Europe, part of why he is chosen to work with the local police in the islands.

Ricky observes that his landlady’s husband and Sydney Jones are linked. Jones follows Ricky when he takes a day off to visit another island. Someone pushes Ricky into the water near a ship, intending to kill him. Ricky survives.

Ricky’s father and his partner Fox check in to a local hotel to begin work with Sergeant Plank. They determine that Dulcie was murdered from the evidence at the scene, and observe Ferrant, known to be a trafficker.

Ricky takes a walk one evening, making sure to pass the place where Syd Jones stays after a few unpleasant encounters with him. Jones and Gilbert Ferrant are inside repacking illegal drugs, ready for transport, and notice Ricky. Ferrant, with his gun, forces Ricky inside, where the two tie him up and beat him up as he is tied to a chair. The two continue their task of repacking heroin.

Alleyn and a larger group of police officers get a warrant to search Jones’ place, unaware that Ricky has been kidnapped until just before they approach the house. Mrs Plank finds a letter at the police office, and races to find them, as the letter was written by the beaten Ricky at Ferrant’s order and delivered by his young son.

The police wait hours until Ferrant opens the door to look outside, and they take him quickly and quietly. Jones repeats this action and he is taken as quickly. Then the police enter, finding Ricky and the illegal drugs ready to ship. Ricky has passed out and is put in the hospital. Rory calls his wife, who flies in to see her son.

Jones is an addict as well as part of the transport, as some of the paint tubes he sells have heroin inside. His desperation for heroin makes him talk a lot, once the police doctor gives him a small dose. Ferrant refuses to talk without his lawyer. Both are jailed.

While Ricky is in hospital, Mr Harkness calls a meeting of his own church, inviting the police and others who are not members. He confesses to putting the wire up to trip the horse and kill his sinful niece. He then hangs himself; someone pulls a curtain across his stage just in time to block the view. The police cannot break the door down backstage until it is too late to save him.

The Alleyn family heads home, once Ricky has recovered.

== Characters ==
- Ricky Alleyn, 21 year old son of Roderick Alleyn and Agatha Troy, spending the long break from university in the Channel Islands
- Chief Inspector Roderick Alleyn, police investigator in London
- Agatha Troy, artist and wife of the Chief Inspector whom she calls Rory
- Inspector Fox, partner to Inspector Alleyn and godfather to Ricky
- Julia and Jasper Pharamand, couple residing in the Channel Islands, at L’Esperance
- Louis and Carlotta Pharamond, also living at L’Esperance. Louis has ties to Peru.
- Bruno, much younger brother of Jasper; early on he made the jump successfully
- Cuthbert Harkness, owner of Leathers, a horseback riding school and the fanatical leader of a religious cult
- Dulcie Harkness, his niece, a good equestrian and recently pregnant
- Mr Bob Blacker, veterinarian
- Dr Carey, local doctor and police surgeon
- Mrs Marie Ferrant, rents a room to Ricky on the island, prepares his meals
- Mr Gilbert Ferrant, her husband, a plumber
- Young Louis, their school age son
- Sydney Jones, young adult artist originally from Australia, who sells tubes of oil paints on the side
- Sgt Joe Plank
- Mrs Plank, his wife

== Reception ==
This novel had a weak reception in 1977, called “An Alleyn wash-out” by Kirkus Reviews. Both father (“rather colorless”) and son (“struggling writer and first-class wimp”) were found wanting in this novel.

Other sources that had reviewed other mystery novels, earlier and later, by Ngaio Marsh skipped this novel, e.g. The New York Times, which did review Photo Finish published in 1980, and many of her earlier novels.

A more recent review by the late mystery game writer Noah Stewart is strongly negative, summed up as “This book is not worth your time.” This criticism is detailed by the weaknesses of both plot and characters. The plot in 1977 fails to match the reality of the international illegal drug trade in the 1970s, and the main characters are weak.
