= Patrick Malahide =

British actor (born 1945)

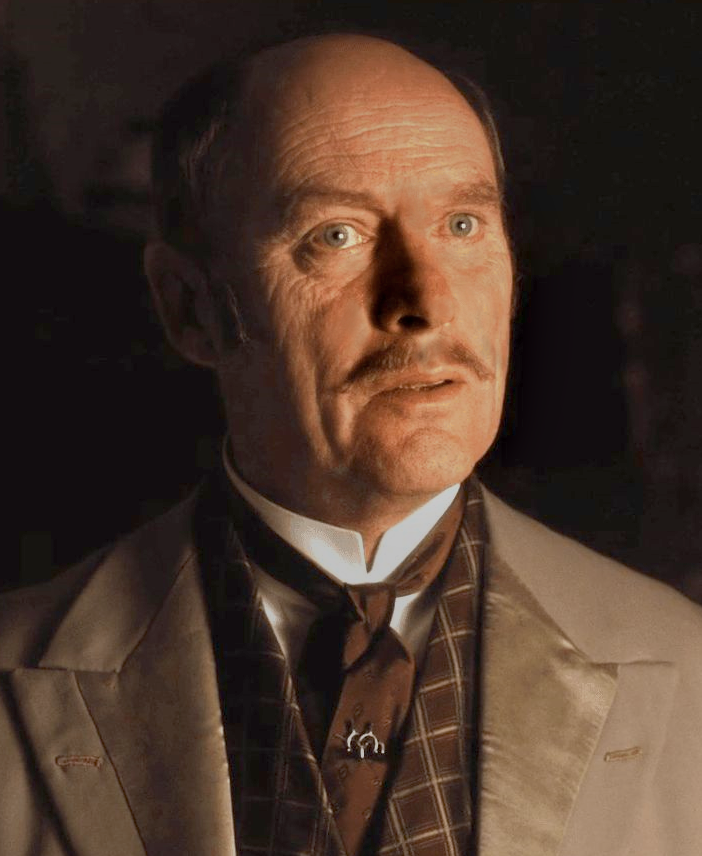
- Malahide in The Paradise (2012)
- Born: Patrick Gerald Duggan; 24 March 1945 (age 81); Reading, Berkshire, England
- Occupation: Actor
- Years active: 1969–present
- Spouse: Rosi Wright (m. 1970)

Patrick Gerald Duggan (born 24 March 1945), known professionally as Patrick Malahide, is a British actor of stage and screen. His acting credits include The New Avengers (1976), ITV Playhouse (1977), The Eagle of the Ninth (1977), Sweeney 2 (1978), The Professionals (1978), Comfort and Joy (1984), The Singing Detective (1986), A Month in the Country (1987), Minder (1979–1988), Middlemarch (1994), The Inspector Alleyn Mysteries (1993–1994), Captain Corelli's Mandolin (2001), The World Is Not Enough (1999), New Tricks, (2006), Brideshead Revisited (2008), The Paradise (2012), Luther (2015–2019), Bridget Jones's Baby (2016), Game of Thrones (2012–2016), Mortal Engines (2018), The Protégé (2021), and Liaison (2023).

== Early life ==
Malahide was born in Reading, Berkshire, England, the son of Irish immigrants; his mother was a cook, and his father secretary of the bursar at The Nautical College of Pangbourne. His education began at St Anne's Primary School, Caversham, Reading, then at Douai School in Woolhampton, Berkshire. He furthered his education at the University of Edinburgh in Scotland, studying experimental psychology. Here, he began to develop his skills in acting, after joining the university's Dramatic Society, and making two appearances at the Edinburgh Festival Fringe.

== Acting career ==
He made his television debut in 1976, in an episode of The Flight of the Heron, then in single episodes of Sutherland's Law, and The New Avengers (1976), and ITV Playhouse (1977). He was then in an adaptation of The Eagle of the Ninth, and his first film was Sweeney 2 in the following year. In 1979, he began a nine-year stint as Detective Sergeant Albert "Cheerful Charlie" Chisholm in the popular TV series Minder. Other television appearances have included playing Alfred Jingle in The Pickwick Papers (1985), he starred in The Singing Detective (1986), Middlemarch (1994), and played Ngaio Marsh's Inspector Roderick Alleyn in the 1993–94 series. In 2006 he reunited with Dennis Waterman from Minder, appearing in an episode of New Tricks, playing Chopper Hadley in Season 3, Episode 4's "Diamond Geezers".

His films include Comfort and Joy (1984), A Month in the Country (1987), and Captain Corelli's Mandolin (2001), alongside Nicolas Cage and Penélope Cruz. In 1999, he made an appearance in the introduction to the James Bond film The World Is Not Enough, alongside Pierce Brosnan, playing a Swiss banker named Lachaise working in Bilbao. He played Mr. Ryder in Brideshead Revisited (2008).

From 2012 to 2016 portrayed Balon Greyjoy, Lord of the Iron Islands, and the father of Theon and Yara, of House Greyjoy, in the HBO TV series Game of Thrones. In 2012, he played Lord Glendenning in The Paradise. He was a recurring character in Luther (2015–2019), and appeared in Bridget Jones's Baby (2016).

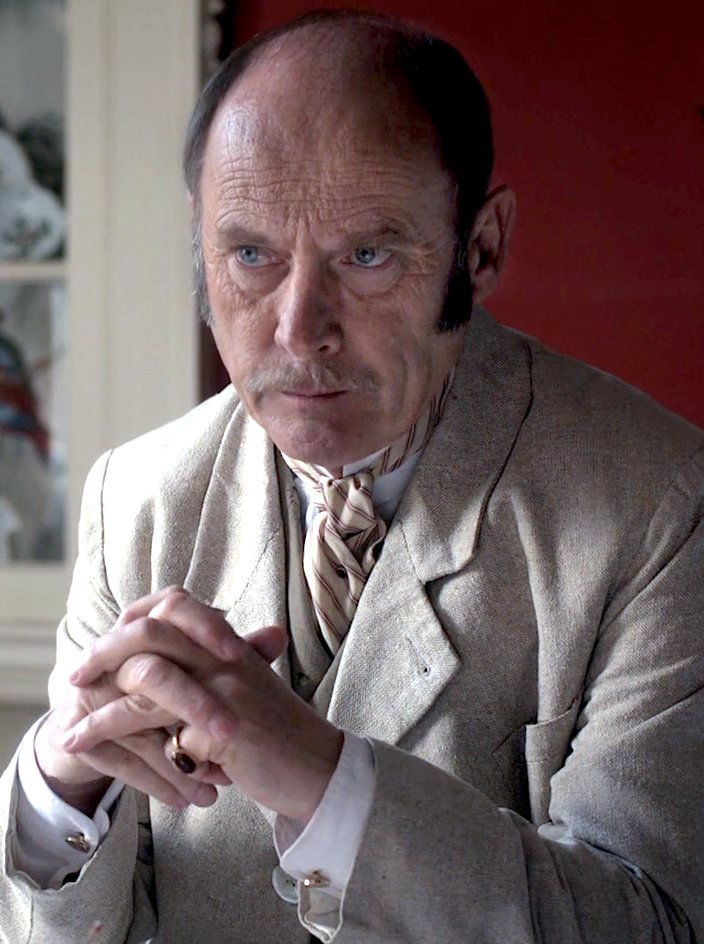
Patrick Malahide in The Paradise 2012

In 2018, he portrayed Magnus Crome in Mortal Engines. In 2021, he starred as Vohl in the Martin Campbell directed action film The Protégé, alongside Maggie Q, Michael Keaton and Samuel L. Jackson. In 2023, he played the role of Alison's father Jack Rowdy, in Liaison, in a cast that included Vincent Cassel, Eva Green and Peter Mullan.

== Filmography ==
Year	Title	Role	Notes
1976	The New Avengers	George	Episode: "Gnaws"
1977	The Eagle of the Ninth	Cradoc	Episode: "Frontier Fort"
1978	Sweeney 2	Major Conway	
1978	The Standard	Colin Anderson	13 episodes
1978	The Sweeney	Mason	Episode: "Drag Act"
1978	The Professionals	1st Security Man	Episode: "Fall Girl"
1979–1988	Minder	Detective Sergeant Albert 'Cheerful Charlie' Chisholm	24 episodes
1981	Dear Enemy	Dr. Robin "Sandy" MacRae	7 episodes
1983	The Black Adder	Guy of Glastonbury	Episode: "The Black Seal"
1984	Comfort and Joy	Colin	
1984	The Killing Fields	Morgan	
1985	The Pickwick Papers	Alfred Jingle	8 episodes
1986	The December Rose	Mr. Hastymite	5 episodes
1986	Screen Two	John Carter	Episode: "The Russian Soldier"
1986	The Singing Detective	Mark Binney / Finney / Raymond	6 episodes
1987	A Month in the Country	Reverend Keach	
1987	Our Geoff	Geoff Boycott	TV film
1988	News at Twelve	Arthur Starkey	6 episodes
1988	The One Game	Magnus	TV serial, 4 episodes
1988	The Franchise Affair	Robert Blair	6 episodes
1990	Inspector Morse	Jeremy Boynton	Episode: "Driven to Distraction"
1990	December Bride	Rev. Edwin Sorleyson	
1991	Lovejoy	Sir Hugo Carey-Holden	Episode: "The Italian Venus"
1991	Children of the North	Colonel Mailer	4 episodes
1992	Performance	Dr. Rank	Episode: "A Doll's House"
1992	The Blackheath Poisonings	Robert Dangerfield	3 episodes
1993–1994	The Inspector Alleyn Mysteries	Roderick Alleyn	8 episodes
1994	Middlemarch	Rev. Edward Casaubon	4 episodes
1994	A Man of No Importance	Inspector Carson	
1995	Two Deaths	George Bucsan	
1995	Kidnapped	Ebenezer	TV film
1995	Cutthroat Island	Governor Ainslee	
1996	The Long Kiss Goodnight	Leland Perkins	
1997	The Beautician and the Beast	Leonid Kleist	
1997	'Til There Was You	Timo	
1997	Deacon Brodie	Bailie Creech	TV film
1998	US Marshals	DSS Director Bertrum Lamb	
1998	The Wonderful World of Disney	Georg Duckwitz	Episode: "Miracle at Midnight"
1998	Heaven	Dr. Melrose	
1998	Nova	John Harrison	Episode: "Lost at Sea: The Search for Longitude"
1999	Captain Jack	Mr. Lancing	
1999	The World Is Not Enough	Lachaise	
1999	All the King's Men	Capt. Claude Howlett	TV film
2000	Ordinary Decent Criminal	Commissioner Daly	
2000	Fortress 2: Re-Entry	Prison Director Peter Teller	
2000	Billy Elliot	Principal	
2000	Quills	Delbené	
2001	Captain Corelli's Mandolin	Colonel Barge	
2001	Victoria & Albert	Sir John Conroy	TV series
2002	The Abduction Club	Sir Myles	
2002	The Final Curtain	Dr. Colworth	
2002	Goodbye, Mr. Chips	Ralston	TV film
2003	In Search of the Brontes	Patrick Brontë	TV film
2003	Agatha Christie's Poirot	Sir Montague Depleach	Episode: "Five Little Pigs"
2004	EuroTrip	Arthur Frommer	
2004	Amnesia	D.I. Brennan	2 episodes
2004	The Rocket Post	Charles Ilford	
2005	Sahara	Ambassador Polidori	
2005	Extras	Minister	Episode: "Samuel L Jackson"
2005	Friends and Crocodiles	Anders	TV film
2005	Elizabeth I	Sir Francis Walsingham	2 episodes
2006	New Tricks	Chopper Hadley	Episode: "Diamond Geezers"
2006	Like Minds	Headmaster	
2007	Five Days	John Poole	5 episodes
2008	Brideshead Revisited	Mr Ryder	
2008	The 39 Steps	Professor Fisher	TV film
2009	A Short Stay in Switzerland	Richard	TV film
2009	Into the Storm	Major-General Bernard Montgomery	TV film
2009	Survivors	Mr Landry	3 episodes
2010	National Theatre Live: Hamlet	Claudius	
2012	Endeavour	Richard Lovell	Episode: "Pilot"
2012	The Paradise	Lord Glendenning	8 episodes
2012	Hunted	Jack Turner	8 episodes
2012–2016	Game of Thrones	Lord Balon Greyjoy	4 episodes
2014	New Worlds	John Francis	2 episodes
2015–2016	Indian Summers	Lord Willingdon	10 episodes
2015–2019	Luther	George Cornelius	6 episodes
2016	Bridget Jones's Baby	George Wilkins	
2018	Mortal Engines	Magnus Crome	
2021	The Protégé	Vohl	
2023	Liaison	Jack Rowdy	
