= Theatre-fiction =

Stories that focus on theatres

Theatre-fiction refers to novels and stories that focus on theatre – its people, practices and industries. Characters often include actors, playwrights, directors, prompters, understudies, set designers, critics, or casting agents. Common settings may include theatre auditoriums, dressing rooms, rehearsal spaces, or other places in which theatre is created and performed. Theatre-fiction may engage with and represent many different varieties of theatre, from performances of Shakespearean tragedy to Kabuki theatre to pantomime.

Critics such as Lisa Jackson-Schebetta, and Stefano Boselli have discussed the value of theatre-fiction in contributing to our understanding of theatre's histories and medial complexities. As Boselli writes, "Since theatre tends to give more weight to the expressive sphere, often deliberately obscuring the real lives and troubles of the artists involved, one of the roles of theatre-fiction is to provide access not just to a backstage dimension that may chronologically overlap with the creative process or the performance itself but also to a broader historical awareness that embraces the multitude of agents, from living beings to material entities, that contribute to what is shown in front of the audience."
