= Maureen Corrigan =

American author, scholar, and literary critic (born 1955)

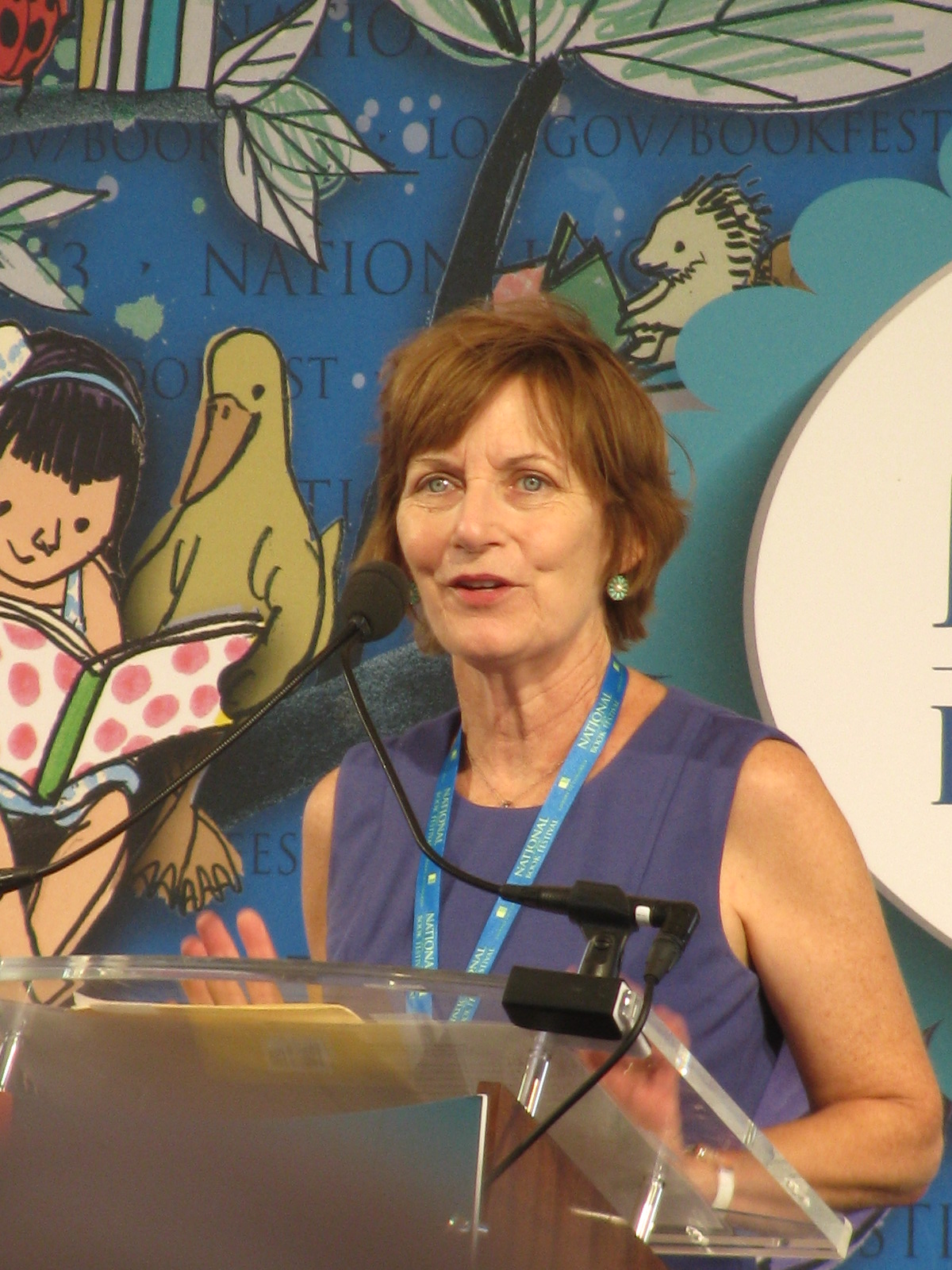
- Born: Maureen D. Corrigan; July 30, 1955 (age 71); New York City, US
- Education: Fordham University; University of Pennsylvania
- Occupations: Journalist; critic; author
- Children: 1
- Writing career
- Years active: 1981–
- Genres: Criticism, nonfiction
- Notable works: So We Read On: How The Great Gatsby Came to Be and Why It Endures (2014)
- Notable awards: 1999 Edgar Award for Best Critical Work; 2018 Nona Balakian Citation for Excellence in Reviewing
- Website: maureencorrigan.com

Maureen Corrigan (born July 30, 1955) is an American author, scholar, and literary critic. She is the book critic on the NPR radio program Fresh Air and writes for the "Book World" section of The Washington Post. In 2014, she wrote So We Read On, a book on the origins and power of The Great Gatsby. In 2005, she published a literary memoir Leave Me Alone, I'm Reading: Finding and Losing Myself in Books. Corrigan was awarded the 2018 Nona Balakian Citation for Excellence in Reviewing by the National Book Critics Circle for her reviews on Fresh Air on NPR and in The Washington Post, and the 1999 Edgar Award for Criticism by the Mystery Writers of America for her book Mystery & Suspense Writers, co-authored with Robin W. Winks.

== Early life ==
Maureen Corrigan was born on July 30, 1955, and raised in Queens, New York, to a working-class family. She credits her father, another "lone reader," for inspiring her love of reading. Corrigan holds a B.A. degree from Fordham University, as well as an M.A. and Ph.D. from the University of Pennsylvania.

== Career ==
Corrigan is The Nicky and Jamie Grant Distinguished Professor of the Practice in Literary Criticism at Georgetown University where she began teaching in 1989. Her specialist subjects include the work of F. Scott Fitzgerald, the literature of New York City, Public Intellectuals in America, American Detective Fiction and Contemporary Literature. Her first book reviews were published in The Village Voice while she was in the graduate school at University of Pennsylvania.

Corrigan serves on the advisory council of the American Writers Museum. She served as a juror for the 2012 Pulitzer Prize in Fiction and as a member of the advisory panel of The American Heritage Dictionary and an advisor to the National Endowment of the Arts "Big Read" project.

Corrigan has been a book critic for NPR on the Peabody Award-winning Fresh Air radio program for three decades. She is a reviewer and columnist for the "Book World" section of The Washington Post since 1990, and essays and reviews written by her have appeared in publications such as The Wall Street Journal, The Village Voice, The New York Times, The Nation, The New York Observer, Salon and The Philadelphia Inquirer.

Along with Robin Winks, she was an associate editor of and contributor to Mystery & Suspense Fiction (Scribner, 1999), a work which won the Edgar Award for Criticism from Mystery Writers of America in 1999, for both authors.

She wrote about the novel David Copperfield by Charles Dickens in The Books That Changed My Life.

=== So We Read On ===
Corrigan investigates what makes F. Scott Fitzgerald's The Great Gatsby so captivating and influential, through "archives, high school classrooms, and even out onto the Long Island Sound, to explore the novel's hidden depths, a journey whose revelations include Gatsby's surprising debt to hard-boiled crime fiction, its rocky path to recognition as a "classic," and its profound commentaries on the national themes of race, class, and gender."

Corrigan pinpoints restlessness as a quintessential American quality, one she perceives in Fitzgerald's knowing depiction of New York City, the great mecca for dreamers with its promise of freedom, new identities, success, and "unsentimental sex." She explains why she considers The Great Gatsby to be "America's greatest novel about class" as well as the vanquishing of God and the worship of idols in the aftermath of World War I, the fantasy that one can truly reinvent one's self, the grandeur of longing, and the spell of illusion.

=== Leave Me Alone, I'm Reading ===
Corrigan has written a literary memoir, Leave Me Alone, I'm Reading: Finding and Losing Myself in Books, first published in 2005, which reviews the books that most influenced her personally, belonging in the main to three non-canonical genres – female extreme-adventure tales (narratives recounting "private tests of endurance" in women's lives), hard-boiled detective novels, and Catholic-martyr narratives. The main focus of the book, however, is on the first extreme adventure tales, and Corrigan observes that narratives themed around female suffering are today breaking with a millennia-old tradition. Where women used to suffer in silence, all the while plotting under a surface of stillness – like Penelope in Homer's Odyssey, who has to put up for years with unwanted suitors – in more recent narratives women begin to act: they talk back, and fight.

== Awards ==
Corrigan was awarded the 2018 Nona Balakian Citation for Excellence in Reviewing by the National Book Critics Circle for her reviews on Fresh Air on NPR and in The Washington Post, and the 1999 Edgar Award for Criticism by the Mystery Writers of America for her book Mystery & Suspense Writers, co-authored with Robin W. Cook. In 2026, Corrigan was awarded an Honorary Doctorate of Letters by her undergraduate alma mater, Fordham University.

== Personal life ==
Corrigan lives in Washington, D.C., with her husband and daughter.

== Bibliography ==
- Corrigan, Maureen (September 9, 2014). So We Read On: How The Great Gatsby Came to Be and Why It Endures. Little, Brown and Company Publishing Group. ISBN 978-0-316-23007-0.
- Corrigan, Maureen (January 2, 2007). Leave Me Alone, I'm Reading: Finding and Losing Myself in Books. Knopf Doubleday Publishing Group. ISBN 978-0-375-70903-6.
- Winks, Robin W.; Corrigan, Maureen (1998). Mystery & Suspense Writers. Scribner Writers. Charles Scribner's Sons. ISBN 978-0-684-31661-1.
