= Dvorce =

Dvorce may refer to places:

== Czech Republic ==
- Dvorce (Bruntál District), a municipality and village in the Moravian-Silesian Region
- Dvorce (Jihlava District), a municipality and village in the Vysočina Region
- Dvorce, a village and part of Jičín in the Hradec Králové Region
- Dvorce, a village and part of Kyjov (Havlíčkův Brod District) in the Vysočina Region
- Dvorce, a village and part of Lysá nad Labem in the Central Bohemian Region
- Dvorce, a village and part of Sedlec-Prčice in the Central Bohemian Region
- Dvorce, a village and part of Stráž nad Nežárkou in the South Bohemian Region
- Dvorce, a village and part of Tučapy (Tábor District) in the South Bohemian Region

== North Macedonia ==
- Dvorce, Saraj, a village

== Slovakia ==
- Dvorce (Slovakia), a former village

== Slovenia ==
- Dvorce, Brežice, a settlement

== See also ==
- Dvorec
- Divorce (disambiguation)
