= The Intruder (McFadden novel) =

2025 novel by Freida McFadden

The Intruder is a thriller novel by Freida McFadden, published by Posined Pen Press as an imprint of Sourcebooks. The book came out 7 October 2025 in the United States and is the author's 19th standalone book and 27th book total.

== Plot summary ==
The Intruder is written in two different timelines and perspectives that slowly turns into one.

In the present-day timeline we follow Casey, a former teacher living off the grid in a rundown, isolated cabin in the woods of New Hampshire after an unknown incident that got her fired from her teaching job. When a dangerous storm hits, Casey's quiet isolation is shattered when she discovers a blood-covered, 13-year-old girl named Nell hiding inside her tool shed while clutching a bloody knife. Driven by deep empathy rather than basic caution, Casey takes Nell inside, feeds her, cleans her up, and offers her shelter from the freezing storm. However, strange behavior and missing items quickly make Casey wonder what the girl is hiding.

The secondary timeline takes place earlier, following Ella, a young girl growing up in horrific conditions under the care of her abusive mother. Ella is constantly bullied in school, mainly because of the state that her mother puts her in. She never has clean clothes or food. After a while, Ella finds comfort and survival only through her bond with a troubled classmate named Anton, who helps her endure her traumatic home life. But things take a turn when Anton assaults the girl who bullied Ella after an argument, to the point where the bully's face is destroyed and Anton is sent to juvie.

A major turning point reveals that Casey is actually Ella grown up. Having suffered extreme abuse as a child, Ella kills her mother by setting the house on fire with her mother in it after Anton got sent to juvie. After the fire Ella moves in with her father who until that point wasn't allowed to be in Ella's life because of her mother, and changes her name to Casey. As an adult, Casey dedicated herself to protecting neglected children. Her passion for protecting neglected children is now revealed to be the reason she got fired in the first place. She attacked the father of one of her students after the student showed signs of being abused.

Meanwhile in the present timeline, Nell has taken Casey’s firearm and fled into the storm to carry out her true mission, killing Casey's neighbor, Lee, whom she believes is the father who abandoned her. When Casey realizes where Nell is going, she fights through the storm to stop Nell before she commits murder.

In the final confrontation, the last secrets are explained. Lee is not Nell’s father, he is actually Bradley, Anton's little brother, who changed his identity. Nell’s true biological father is Anton, Casey’s childhood love, who is dead for all Casey and Nell knows. Casey manages to disarm Nell and prevent the shooting. Filled with rage from finding out how Nell's mother was treating her daughter, Casey attacked Jolene to free Nell.

Anton actually is still alive and currently serving a life sentence in prison for killing his own abusive father. Before his conviction, Anton asked Lee to quietly watch over and make sure Casey is safe. The book ends with Lee going to visit Anton in prison and Casey finding out that Anton is Nell's father by seeing a photo of young Anton that Lee gave to Nell.

== Major Themes ==
The major theme in the book is childhood trauma, trust and betrayal, and the cyclical nature of violence. McFadden said that revenge is generally her favorite topic when she´s writing books. She also said that "My general feeling is that in life, people rarely get exactly what they deserve. But in art, you can dole out that poetic justice, which I enjoyed doing again in The Intruder”.

== Development ==
In describing her inspiration for the novel, McFadden said that "The mother-and-child bond is a strong one, and that’s why being betrayed by a mother is one of the most psychologically damaging things to happen to a person. A childhood plagued by a cruel mother is the perfect ‘origin story’ for a villain or antihero. I’m intrigued by the idea that a person can be good deep down but still do bad things. Or a person can be mostly ‘evil’ yet still have sympathetic qualities”.

She also stated that “One of my biggest inspirations for this book was my own daughter, who is about the same age as Ella, and in my opinion, just as much of a badass,”.

== Reception ==
Kirkus reviews called The Intruder a "grim yet gleefully gratifying tale of lost innocence and found family". A reviewer on The Strand Magazine gave the book a positive review where it was stated that "What stood out in The Intruder was how much attention Freida seems to have paid to her clue-building. I have to say, it was a lot of fun! I felt like a movie detective with a notepad, keeping track of every detail."

The book was nominated for the Goodreads Choice Award for Readers Favorite Mystery and Thriller 2025. It was also on the Barnes and Nobles list of best books in 2025 in the mystery and thriller category
