= Dear Debbie =

2026 novel by Freida McFadden

- Book cover
- Author: Freida McFadden
- Language: English
- Genre: Psychological thriller
- Set in: Massachusetts
- Publisher: Poisoned Pen Press
- Publication date: January 27, 2026
- Publication place: United States
- Pages: 336
- ISBN: 978-1-464-24962-4

Dear Debbie is a 2026 psychological thriller novel by American author Freida McFadden. The novel follows Debbie Mullen, a Massachusetts housewife and advice columnist whose life unravels after she is fired from her newspaper, prompting her to take violent revenge against the people she believes have wronged her and her family.

== Plot ==
Debra "Debbie" Mullen, a housewife and advice columnist for the local newspaper, lives in Hingham, Massachusetts with her accountant husband Cooper and her teenage daughters Lexi and Izzy. She dropped out of the Massachusetts Institute of Technology after being raped her sophomore year, but still dabbles in programming, developing smartphone apps for her family.

Frustrated with her life, Debbie starts taking revenge against those around her. A gardening magazine cancels a planned photoshoot at Debbie's home after her neighbor Jo poaches the opportunity; Debbie secretly buries Japanese beetle traps under Jo's garden, and the pests later swarm and devour Jo's plants. She also gives violent food poisoning to the condescending and belittling members of her book club by feeding them tainted sandwiches.

When Cooper's boss Ken refuses to make him a partner at the firm, Cooper resigns. That same day, Debbie's boss Garrett fires her from the newspaper over a column in which she advised a woman suffering financial abuse to get a divorce; the paper has received legal threats from the woman's husband.

After Izzy is cut from her soccer team for gaining weight, Debbie breaks into the coach's house at night. Cooper wakes up, discovers Debbie missing, and tracks her phone's location to Weymouth. The next morning, Debbie visits Ken at his home, claiming she wants to discuss Cooper's promotion. Garrett angrily calls Cooper, suspecting that Debbie has hacked the newspaper's website to display Garrett's sex tape. Izzy's coach is later arrested after police find an app on his phone that connects to a hidden camera in the girls' locker room.

Debbie's new acquaintance Harley, a trainer at the local gym, is having an affair with Cooper. Curious about Cooper's home life and his lack of internet presence, Harley has befriended Debbie and is plotting to take her place. While visiting Harley's apartment, Debbie recognizes the scent of a man's shirt in her bedroom. Debbie grows suspicious of Cooper after realizing that he is turning off his phone's location sharing. Meanwhile, when Cooper discovers that the address in Weymouth belongs to Izzy's coach, he starts to suspect Debbie.

Lexi tells Debbie that her boyfriend Zane is threatening to share naked photographs of her. Debbie texts Zane from Lexi's phone, offering to meet him. She then drugs him, deletes the photos of Lexi from his phone, and sends incriminating evidence to the police. The next day, a drunken Zane crashes his car into the school, breaking his neck.

Cooper learns that Ken has suddenly departed on vacation, and that money is missing from the company account. Lexi and Izzy discover drafts of Debbie's columns in which she gives violent and disturbing "advice". Cooper visits Ken's house after seeing the address in Debbie's location history. He discovers Ken, dead of a gunshot wound, and believes that Debbie is attempting to frame him for the murder.

Returning to the MIT campus, Debbie plans to burn down the fraternity house where she was raped, but changes her mind after speaking with the fraternity president. Harley invites Debbie and Cooper for dinner, intending to reveal the truth about her affair. However, the man Harley knows as "Cooper" is actually Cooper's married coworker Jesse, using a fake name to conceal his identity. Debbie also knows Jesse to be her rapist from college, although he does not recognize her.

Debbie—who already knew about their affair—drugs Jesse before shooting and killing Harley with Jesse's gun, which she stole from Jesse's house and which she also used to kill Ken. Debbie stages the scene to frame Jesse for Harley's and Ken's murders, as well as the firm's missing money. Cooper confesses to Debbie that he turned off his location sharing because he has been secretly attending Alcoholics Anonymous meetings.

One year later, Cooper has started his own accounting firm, while Debbie sells one of her phone apps for a huge profit. Jesse is violently assaulted in prison on the orders of another inmate, the brother of a girl Jesse raped and killed in college. Debbie reveals that Ken was the financially abusive husband who got her fired from the paper, and that she plotted to kill him together with his ex-wife Cindy.

== Background ==
McFadden revealed Dear Debbie and its cover in July 2025 to USA Today. She also listed her "favorite revenge stories" which she used as inspiration for the novel, including S. A. Cosby's Razorblade Tears and Gillian Flynn's Gone Girl.

In a 2026 interview with Reader's Digest, McFadden said that there were "definitely parts of me" in the character of Debbie, adding: "I could imagine an alternative universe where I just get mad at everything and start to snap... in real life, it’s so rare to get justice in the way that you want. It’s like there’s nothing you can do. So there was something satisfying in writing about these feelings."

== Publication history ==
In October 2024, McFadden signed a book deal with Sourcebooks, including three new psychological thrillers. Dear Debbie, the first book in the deal, was published by Poisoned Pen Press on January 27, 2026.

== Reception ==
Dear Debbie appeared on multiple weekly bestseller lists, including The New York Times, USA Today, Publishers Weekly, and The Washington Post. As of July 4, 2026, the novel had sold 463,647 copies in the U.S., according to Circana BookScan.

E. A. Aymar, in The Washington Post, praised Dear Debbie's "malevolent but weirdly endearing black humor" and called McFadden an "efficient storyteller", but said the book's twists were "improbable" and "relying too heavily on coincidence." For The Times, Sarah Ditum called the novel "ferociously readable, with plot twists that fall somewhere between 'audacious' and 'absurd'."

Dear Debbie received a starred review from Booklist's Kristine Huntley, who said that "McFadden is an expert at keeping the pages turning and misdirecting her audience, ensuring several surprises." Publishers Weekly called the novel a "darkly funny thriller" that "becomes a tad monotonous" but "will put a wicked smile on readers' faces." Lauren Hackert of Library Journal wrote that "McFadden crafts an intense, intricate suspense novel about marriage, motherhood, and what hides behind the mask of perfection." Kirkus Reviews called the novel "gleefully sadistic, gloriously gratifying revenge fiction", while adding that "some of the plot's myriad twists are more impressive than others".

== Adaptation ==
In September 2025, Deadline Hollywood reported that Amazon MGM Studios was developing a television series based on Dear Debbie, with Gina Girolamo serving as the executive producer. In February 2026, Deadline announced that Ildy Modrovich would be the series' showrunner, writer, and second executive producer.
