= The Coworker =

2023 thriller novel by Freida McFadden

- Book cover
- Author: Freida McFadden
- Language: English
- Genre: Psychological thriller
- Set in: Boston; Rhode Island
- Publisher: Poisoned Pen Press
- Publication date: 2023
- Publication place: United States
- Pages: 368
- ISBN: 9781728296203

The Coworker is a 2023 psychological thriller novel by American author Freida McFadden. The book follows Natalie, a sales representative who becomes entangled in the mysterious disappearance of her colleague Dawn.

== Plot ==
Natalie, a beautiful and popular sales representative for Boston nutritional supplement company Vixed, discovers that her normally punctual colleague Dawn is mysteriously absent from work. Dawn—a socially awkward and lonely accountant who is obsessed with turtles—had messaged Natalie the day before, requesting a meeting. Natalie finds a turtle figurine on her own desk, and when she answers Dawn's phone, a voice pleads with her for help.

After Dawn fails to appear at the office, Natalie visits Dawn's house in Quincy. Dawn is not home, but Natalie discovers blood on the living room carpet. After calling the police, she attempts to give herself an alibi, lying that she was with her new boyfriend Caleb—an IT worker at Vixed—for the entire night. The police search Dawn's house, finding Natalie's fingerprints on knives and a wine glass. They repeatedly interview Natalie, suspicious of her relationship with Dawn after reading Dawn's emails to her friend Mia. In the emails, Dawn described to Mia how she had tried to be friends with Natalie, but Natalie had rebuffed her and bullied her instead. The police also learn that Natalie has been sleeping with her married boss Seth.

A dead body suspected to be Dawn is discovered, beaten to death and unrecognizable. Natalie finds the potential murder weapon planted inside her laundry basket: a bloody ceramic turtle apparently missing from Dawn's bookshelf at home. She smashes the turtle to pieces and disposes of it at Wollaston Beach.

Seth tells Natalie that Dawn believed Natalie was embezzling money from Vixed; he suspends Natalie from her job while he investigates. After first covering for Natalie, Caleb admits the truth to the police: he did not spend the night at Natalie's house, leaving her without a watertight alibi.

Natalie receives a series of silent phone calls and traces them to a motel in Rhode Island. Despite Dawn's disappearance, Natalie proceeds with organizing her annual 5K charity run for cerebral palsy research in honor of Amelia, her deceased friend from high school. However, the police search Natalie's house and later arrest her for Dawn's murder the morning of the run. Natalie asks Caleb to go investigate the motel for her.

Dawn is in fact hiding out at the motel after faking her death, attempting to frame Natalie for her own murder. Dawn was Amelia's best friend in high school and blames Natalie for Amelia's death, vowing revenge. Natalie was far from being Amelia's friend, as she now claims. In reality, Natalie and her friend Tara bullied Amelia for her disability; Amelia later committed suicide.

Caleb, revealed to be Amelia's half-brother and helping with Dawn's revenge plot, reunites with Dawn at the motel. Dawn and Caleb are actually dating; they got jobs at Vixed to make it easier to frame Natalie, and Caleb is pretending to date Natalie to get closer to her. Caleb created a fake account for "Mia" (Amelia's nickname) so that Dawn could plant evidence against Natalie in her emails. He also put the turtle in Natalie's laundry basket and placed the objects with Natalie's fingerprints inside Dawn's house.

The police discover that the dead body is not Dawn. Seth pays Natalie's bail, and they go to investigate the motel themselves, suspicious of Caleb. They learn that Caleb and Dawn were both seen there and recently departed. Returning to Boston, Natalie confronts Caleb, who tells her that Dawn is missing.

At Wollaston Beach, Natalie discovers Dawn—desperate for revenge and planning to drown herself so that Natalie will once again be framed for her murder. Dawn nearly attacks Natalie, but Natalie apologizes for Amelia's death and reassures Dawn that Caleb is in love with Dawn, not her. Natalie later learns that the dead body is her high school friend Tara.

Dawn tells the police that she became disoriented and went missing after the ceramic turtle fell on her head, and they drop the investigation. One year later, Dawn and Caleb are engaged, while Natalie and Seth are also together. Natalie and Dawn co-organize the 5K run in honor of Amelia. Both women tacitly agree to conceal the other's secret: Dawn knows Natalie is skimming money from the company, and Natalie knows Dawn killed Tara.

== Publication history ==
The Coworker was published by Poisoned Pen Press on August 29, 2023. Sourcebooks acquired the book's world English rights in October of that year, with plans to publish internationally in November.

== Reception ==
The Coworker appeared on multiple weekly bestseller lists, including The New York Times, USA Today, and Publishers Weekly.

Beverly Jenkins, for The Mary Sue, called The Coworker "a cat-and-mouse game that has you questioning who's good and who's evil right up until the final chapter." MeLina Toppi-DeLeo, for Her Campus, recommended the book to business majors and said it "perfectly captures the corporate culture vibe." In the Broomfield Enterprise, Kerry Pettis said that "no one comes off as completely innocent by the end of this thriller."

The Coworker was nominated for the 2023 Goodreads Choice Award in Mystery & Thriller, losing to another McFadden book, The Housemaid's Secret.

== Adaptation ==
In January 2025, McFadden said that The Coworker had been optioned by Sony Pictures.
