= Catharina Maura =

- Born: November 26, 1993 (age 32)
- Occupation: Author
- Writing career
- Genres: Romance; Contemporary romance; Billionaire romance; Arranged marriage; Marriage of convenience
- Notable work: The Windsors
- Website: catharinamaura.com

Catharina Maura is a Dutch author who writes contemporary romance books.

== Early life ==
From a young age, Maura has always had a passion for writing. She graduated with a BSc in Psychology, a BSc in Accounting, and an MSc in Accounting.

== Career ==
After gaining popularity on BookTok, Maura's series The Windsors was published with Sourcebooks, alongside her standalone Mine for a Moment. She has also published with Hachette Book Group for her romance-fantasy novel, A Curse of Shadows and Ice. She is a USA Today, Amazon #1 and a SPIEGEL bestselling author.

== Personal life ==
Maura was raised in the Netherlands, and is of Surinamese-Indian descent. She currently lives in Hong Kong with her husband.

== Bibliography ==
=== The Stolen Moments trilogy ===
1. Stolen Moments (2020)
2. Illicit Promises (2020)
3. The Ruins of Us (2020)

=== The Tie That Binds & Serendipity ===
1. The Tie That Binds (2020)
2. Serendipity (2020)

=== The Off-Limits series ===
1. Until You (2021)
2. Dr. Grant (2021)
3. Professor Astor (2022)
4. Bittersweet Memories (2022)

=== The Windsors series ===
1. The Wrong Bride (2022)
2. The Temporary Wife (2023)
3. The Unwanted Marriage (2023)
4. The Broken Vows (2023)
5. The Secret Fiancée (2024)
6. The Devious Husband (2024)

=== The Kingstons series ===
1. The Kingstons: Hunter and Calliope's story (2027)
2. The Kingstons book 2 (TBC)
3. The Kingstons book 3 (TBC)
4. The Kingstons book 4 (TBC)

=== The Shadowbound series ===
1. A Curse of Shadows and Ice (2025)
2. These Cursed Fates (2027)

=== Standalones ===
1. Forever After All (2021)
2. Mine for a Moment (2024)
