= Barbara G. Peters =

Founder of The Poisoned Pen mystery bookstore

- Born: December 22, 1940 (age 85)
- Education: Stanford University (B.A.); Northwestern University (M.A.); Univ. of Tennessee (M.S.L.S.)
- Occupations: Bookstore owner, publisher
- Spouse: Robert Rosenwald
- Writing career
- Genre: Mystery fiction
- Website: poisonedpen.com

Barbara G. Peters (December 22, 1940) is a publisher and bookshop owner.

== Life and career ==
Peters was born in Winnetka, Illinois.

She holds a BA from Stanford University, an MA from Northwestern University, an MSLS from the University of Tennessee. She was named a Library of Congress Intern on receipt of her Masters in Library Science, and is a member of the Crime Writers of Canada, the British Crime Writers' Association, and Mystery Writers of America. She is a founder of the now defunct Independent Mystery Booksellers Association.

In 1989 she founded The Poisoned Pen, one of the world's largest mystery bookstores. In 1997 she co-founded Poisoned Pen Press, a separate corporation dedicated to publishing mystery, making available originals and reprints. It became part of Sourcebooks in 2015.

Peters was named by Publishers Weekly as one of the eleven most important people in bookselling in their January 3, 2000 issue in an article entitled "Eleven for the Millennium".

== Awards ==
In 2010 Peters received the Ellery Queen Award, which is given "to honor outstanding writing teams and outstanding people in the mystery-publishing industry.". She is the winner of the Raven Award from the Mystery Writers of America for The Poisoned Pen bookstore. She was the 2007 Bouchercon Fan Guest of Honor, and with husband, publisher Robert Rosenwald, the 2008 Bouchercon Lifetime Achievement Award honoree, again for their work with The Poisoned Pen franchise. In 2011 Peters was presented a Lifetime Achievement Award as CEO of a million-dollar company by The Arizona Republic.

== Published works ==
- AZ Murder Goes...Classic ed. with Susan Malling, 1996. (1998 rev ed. ISBN 1890208086)
  - Nominated for 1997 Edgar Allan Poe Award for Best Critical/Biographical Work
- AZ Murder Goes...Artful ed. with Susan Malling, 2001. ISBN 1890208264
- AZ Murder Goes…Professional. 2002. ISBN 1590580036
