= System crash (disambiguation) =

System crash may refer to the following:

- Crash (computing), a computer system that has encountered an error
- System Crash (TV series), a television series
- System Crash, a music band

== See also ==
- System (disambiguation)
- Crash (disambiguation)
