= Crash pad =

Crash pad may refer to:

- Bouldering mat, a small foam pad used for protection when bouldering
- Punk house, a type of squat popularised by the hippie and punk subcultures
- Crash pad (pilots), a hostel-like setting for airline pilots and flight attendants
- Crash Pad, a 2017 comedy film
- The Crash Pad series, an ongoing queer adult series by Pink and White Productions

== See also ==
- Crash (disambiguation)
- Pad (disambiguation)
