= Betty Webb =

American novelist

Betty Webb is a former journalist and the author of a series of detective stories set in Arizona. She has stated that each book has been inspired by a real case.

== Writing ==
=== Desert series ===
The ‘Desert’ series features Scottsdale-based private eye Lena Jones, a former policewoman. Lena was raised in foster homes and knows little about her own background, but learns more as the series progresses. Betty Webb is one of a number of successors to authors such as Sue Grafton, Marcia Muller, Sara Paretsky and Liza Cody and their female private eye series. Her books have some similarities to those of Muller, and of Nevada Barr. The frontier quality of the southwestern region fits well with the traditions set by Californian noir. Desert Noir, the first in the series, had themes related to development of Arizona such as the destruction of the environment and of cultural heritage by developers; issues of Native American rights and cultural displacement; corruption and greed in the art world; the effects of tourism, etc.

Much of Webb's writings are controversial. "Desert Wives" and "Desert Lost" deal with the polygamy sects in Arizona; "Desert Cut" deals with female genital mutilation. One reviewer commented that the content of "Desert Wives," about ‘wholesale enslavement of women and rampant swindling of the state welfare system’ was ‘eye popping’ and if written as investigative journalism would be a contender for the Pulitzer Prize.

=== Cozies ===
Betty Webb has also begun a series of ‘cozies’ (consciously lightweight, humorous mysteries) about a California zookeeper who solves crimes. She is retired from full-time work as a journalist on a Phoenix newspaper, and now reviews for Mystery Scene Magazine and teaches creative writing. She is a resident of Scottsdale; her family is originally from Alabama.

== Books ==
Published in hardcover and paperback by Poisoned Pen Press, Scottsdale, AZ.

- Desert Noir (2001)
- Desert Wives (2003)
- Desert Shadows (2004)
- Desert Run (2006)
- Desert Cut (2008)
- The Anteater of Death (2008)
- Desert Lost (2009)
- The Koala of Death (2010)
- Desert Wind (2012)
- The Llama of Death (2013)
- Desert Rage (2014)
- The Puffin of Death (2015)
- Desert Vengeance (2017)
- The Otter of Death (2018)
- Desert Redemption (2019)
- The Panda of Death (2020)

== Memberships ==
- National Federation of Newswomen
- Mystery Writers of America
- Society of Southwestern Authors
- Authors Guild
