= Amen Corner (novel) =

Book by Rick Shefchik

- Author: Rick Shefchik
- Language: English
- Genre: Novel
- Publisher: Poisoned Pen Press
- Publication date: 2007
- Publication place: United States
- Media type: Print (hardback & paperback)
- ISBN: 978-1-59058-411-8
- OCLC: 86078184
- Dewey Decimal: 813/.6 22
- LC Class: PS3619.H4514 A84 2007

Amen Corner is a 2007 novel by American author Rick Shefchik, published March 9 by Poisoned Pen Press. A mystery/thriller set at the Masters Tournament of golf, it centers on Minneapolis police detective and amateur golfer Sam Skarda, as he competes in his first Masters and tries to stop a crazed killer determined to put an end to the tournament. It is the first in a series about Skarda and his adventures investigating crime in the sports world. The second, Green Monster, was published August 1, 2008.

== Reviews ==
Bill Ott of Booklist said of the novel “Shefchik…takes his share of shots at the green-jacketed elite who run the Masters, but he makes a game attempt at realism, both in his portrayal of the tournament itself and in his premise: a Minneapolis cop, on medical leave, wins the U.S. Publinx Championship and qualifies for the Masters… Shefchik combines a surprisingly grisly plot and a convincing villain with plenty of more or less realistic golf action … this one makes the cut. Entertaining …”

Marx Swanholm of the Minneapolis Star Tribune called Amen Corner "an entertaining novel, full of inside details on America's closely guarded cathedral of golf."
