= The Housemaid (novel) =

2022 novel by Freida McFadden

- First edition cover
- Author: Freida McFadden
- Language: English
- Series: The Housemaid
- Release number: 1
- Genre: Psychological thriller
- Set in: Long Island
- Publisher: Bookouture
- Publication date: April 2022
- Media type: ebook
- ISBN: 978-1-80314-437-5
- Followed by: The Housemaid's Secret

The Housemaid is a 2022 psychological thriller novel by Freida McFadden and published by Bookouture. Set on Long Island, the novel follows a young maid for a wealthy family with dark secrets. The novel was a commercial success and was adapted into a 2025 film starring Sydney Sweeney and Amanda Seyfried in the leading roles.

== Plot ==
Millie Calloway is a young woman with a troubled past, having recently been fired from her job after an incident that nearly sent her back to prison. Millie is unable to find work due to her criminal record and spends a month living in her car. She jumps at an opportunity to become a live-in housemaid for the wealthy Winchester family: Nina, her husband Andrew, and their daughter Cecelia, who live in a luxurious estate on Long Island.

Millie discovers that the tiny attic room she is staying in locks from the outside. Enzo, the Winchesters' Italian gardener who speaks limited English, tries to warn Millie of "danger". While enduring Nina's reprehensible treatment of her and learning of the woman's prior psychotic episodes and mental hospital stays, Millie bonds with Andrew, who tries to deflect Nina's frequent and unpredictable lashing out. The two develop feelings for each other, and end up sleeping together on a night when Nina is away dropping Cecelia off at camp. Nina learns of their night together and sets out to humiliate and disparage Millie, which ultimately leads Andrew to tell his wife he wants to separate. After Nina is made to leave, Millie prepares to settle in, only to discover, while packing, that Andrew has locked her in the attic room.

From Nina's perspective, it is revealed that Andrew is physically and psychologically abusive towards her, forcing her to undergo cruel "punishments" in a locked room—the same one Millie has been staying in—if she does not behave the way he wants. At the start of their marriage, Andrew had staged an attempted murder–suicide, making it appear that Nina intended to kill both herself and Cecelia, consequently having Nina labeled as insane and giving him control over her. As a result, Nina was sent to an asylum for a year and, after returning, lived life according to Andrew's demands. Enzo realized the situation Nina was in, but was unable to help her without arousing Andrew's suspicion.

After devising a plan to manipulate Andrew into replacing her, Nina began researching possible candidates, and ultimately decided to hire Millie as a housemaid after seeing her record. Everything that happened afterward was part of Nina's plot to get Millie and Andrew to have an affair, so that Andrew would turn his torturous attentions toward Millie. It is also revealed that before being hired by Nina, Millie had served time in prison as a teenager for fatally beating a boy who tried to rape her best friend, Kelsey. After discovering that information, Nina chose her because she believed that Millie could do what she could not: kill Andrew.

In the present, Andrew forces Millie to perform a punishment to earn her way out of the attic, but after he goes in to release her, she incapacitates him using a bottle of pepper spray that Nina had left hidden for her, and locks him in the room. Over the next few days, Millie forces Andrew to perform punishments that grow increasingly worse, culminating in forcing him to rip out four of his own teeth. She reneges on her promises to let him out each time, and ultimately keeps him trapped until he dies of dehydration.

After Enzo convinces Nina to try and help Millie, Nina returns to the house and finds Andrew’s body in the attic. She apologizes to Millie and orders her to flee, while she stays behind and calls the police, intending to protect Millie by taking the blame for Andrew's death. However, police detective Connors ultimately dismisses the incident as an accidental death, concluding that Andrew had accidentally locked himself in the attic while home alone, and closes the case. Privately, he informs Nina that Andrew was previously engaged to his daughter Kathleen and she never fully recovered, hinting that he knew Andrew was dangerous but could not investigate him due to the Winchesters' influence.

After Andrew's funeral, Nina and Cecelia leave the house and move away to start over, while Enzo and Millie form a group dedicated to helping women escape from abusive relationships. A year later, Millie is interviewed by a woman called Lisa Killeffer, who is looking for a housemaid. Lisa tells Millie that Nina highly recommended her. After seeing a bruise on Lisa's arm and deducing that her husband was responsible, Millie understands why Nina recommended her and tells Lisa that she can help her.

== Background ==
McFadden wrote the novel in 2019 but abandoned it after sensing it was "a little too dark" and uncharacteristic of her earlier work. She was later approached by the British digital publishing company Bookouture, which offered to publish one of her books and promote it on their mailing list. She decided to give them The Housemaid, which they published in April 2022. The immediate success of the novel inspired McFadden to sign with an agent in late 2022 and search for a publisher to distribute her books in print. Grand Central Publishing picked up the novel and published it in paperback on August 23, 2022.

== Reception ==
The New York Times reported that, shortly after publication, the book became a "monster hit". In their June 2024 profile of McFadden, the newspaper reported that the book sold more than two million copies and had been on Amazon's best-seller list for 83 weeks, and had spent 60 weeks on The New York Times trade paperback best-seller list. The novel's success also caused a surge in popularity for McFadden's earlier novels. As of January 2026, it has spent 141 weeks on The New York Times trade paperback best-seller list, as well as 112 weeks on its Combined Print and E-Book Fiction list.

In October 2024, The Washington Post reported that the book sold around 1.6 million print copies.

The novel and The Housemaid series in general have amassed a large fanbase and readership partly due to attention from the BookTok community on TikTok, as well as discussion boards on Facebook and Goodreads.

In France, The Housemaid sold more than 630,000 copies in 2024, according to GfK, and was the best-selling novel of the year. In L'Express, Marianne Payot wrote, "Despite some longueurs and repetitions, The Housekeeper holds up. Thanks, in particular, to the cheekiness of its heroine". In Libération, Thomas Stélandre wrote, "It has the fineness of a Stabilo, but it must be said that it is devoured like fast food, whether taken at face value or on a deeper level". The newspaper deemed the novel's primary purpose to be entertainment and quoted an anonymous bookseller who offhandedly remarked that it was "a book for non-readers".

=== Awards ===
- 2023 International Thriller Writers Awards for The Housemaid in the category Best Paperback Original Novel

== Sequels ==
In February 2023, Bookouture published a sequel novel, The Housemaid's Secret. In June 2024, the third book in the series, The Housemaid Is Watching, was published.

== Film adaptation ==
Film rights were acquired in July 2022 by Todd Lieberman's Hidden Pictures, in partnership with Lionsgate. In April 2023, Rebecca Sonnenshine was announced to adapt the screenplay. In October 2024, Paul Feig was announced to direct with a cast of Sydney Sweeney (Millie) and Amanda Seyfried (Nina). Brandon Sklenar joined the cast as Andrew later that same month. In December 2024, Michele Morrone was cast as Enzo. The film was theatrically released on December 19, 2025. It received positive reviews from critics and was a box-office success, grossing $306 million worldwide against a production budget of $35-60 million.

In January 2026, Lionsgate announced that a sequel had been greenlit, with Feig, Sweeney and Morrone returning. The sequel is set to be an adaptation of McFadden's second book in The Housemaid series, The Housemaid's Secret.
