= The Crash =

The Crash may refer to:

- The Crash (band), a pop-rock band from Turku, Finland
- The Crash (1928 film), an American drama film directed by Edward F. Cline
- The Crash (1932 film), an American drama film directed by William Dieterle
- The Crash (2013 miniseries), a BBC drama written by Terry Cafolla
- The Crash (2017 film), an American thriller film directed by Aram Rapp
- The Crash (2026 film), an American documentary film on the murder of Dominic Russo and Davion Flanagan
- Nickname of "Episode 1" (Life on Mars, series 1)
- "The Crash" (Mad Men), an episode of Mad Men
- The Crash Lucha Libre, a Mexican professional wrestling promotion
- The Crash (novel), 2025, by Freida McFadden

== See also ==
- Crash (disambiguation)
