= Raven Award =

Annual mystery writing award

The Raven Award is an award given annually by the Mystery Writers of America (MWA) as part of the Edgar Awards. The Raven Award is given from time to time to non-writers and institutions who have made significant professional contributions to the mystery genre or to MWA. The Board may choose not to award a Raven in any given year.

The first one was presented in 1953. It's not always bestowed every year like the Best Novel or Best Short Story category. Some years feature multiple honorees, while others have none. Though, there was a winner since 1995 up to and including 2022.

== Winners ==
Raven Award winners
Year	Recipient	Type	Link	Ref
1953	E. T. Guymon Jr	librarian of mystery literature		
1954	Dr. Thomas A. Gonzales	medical examiner, NYC		
1954	Tom Lehrer	mystery parody writer		
1954	Dr. Harrison Martland	medical examiner, Essex County, NJ		
1957	Dorothy Kilgallen	Reader of the Year		
1959	Lawrence G. Blochman	service to MWA and The Third Degree		
1959	Frederic G. Melcher	editor of Publishers Weekly		
1959	Franklin Delano Roosevelt	Reader of the Year		
1960	Ray Brennan	reporter of crime		
1960	David C. Cook	publisher of detective stories		
1960	Alfred Hitchcock	director of mystery		
1960	Gail Jackson	producer, Perry Mason		
1960	Phyllis McGinley	Mystery Fan of the Year		
1961	Ilka Chase	Reader of the Year		
1962	The Defenders	television show		
1965	Dr. Milton Helpern	forensic medic		
1965	Philip Wittenberg	volunteer		
1967	Ellery Queen's Mystery Magazine	magazine		
1967	Richard Watts Jr.	Reader of the Year		
1968	Joey Adams	Reader of the Year		
1971	Judith Crist	Reader of the Year		
1975	World Wide Mystery (ABC)	series		
1975	Royal Shakespeare Company	theater company		
1975	Radio Mystery Theatre (CBS): the Hy Brown nightly mysteries	radio program		
1976	Eddie Lawrence	Reader of the Year		
1976	Leo Margulies	editor, Mike Shayne Mystery Magazine		
1978	Danny Arnold	executive producer, Barney Miller (ABC)		
1978	Edward Gorey	set designer, Dracula on Broadway		
1978	Richard N. Hughes	television executive and editorialist, I Am My Brother's Keeper (WPIX)		
1979	Alberto Tedeschi	publisher of Italian series mystery (via Mondadori)		
1980	The Muppet Show: Muppet Murders			
1983	Isaac Bashevis Singer	Reader of the Year		
1984	Sylvia Porter	Reader of the Year		
1985	Eudora Welty	Reader of the Year		
1986	Suzi Oppenheimer	Reader of the Year		
1988	Angela Lansbury	actress		
1988	Vincent Price	actor		
1989	Bouchercon Annual World Mystery Convention	convention for mystery readers and writers		
1989	Marilyn Abrams, Bruce Jordan for Shear Madness (Cranberry Productions)	off-Broadway play		
1991	Carol Brener	bookseller		
1991	Sarah Booth Conroy	Reader of the Year		
1992	Harold Q. Masur	general counsel to MWA		
1993	President Bill Clinton	Reader of the Year		
1995	Paul LeClerc	president, New York Public Library		
1996	Library of America	non-profit publisher, collected writings of Raymond Chandler		
1997	Marvin Lachman	author		
1998	Sylvia K. Burack	editor, The Writer Magazine		
1999	Steven Bochco	writer and producer		
2000	The Mercantile Library (Harold Augenbraum, director)	library; NYC		
2001	The Poisoned Pen (Barbara G. Peters, owner)	bookstore; Scottsdale, AZ		
2001	The Rue Morgue (Tom and Enid Schantz, owners)	bookstore; Boulder, CO		
2002	Charles Champlin	film critic at LA Times		
2002	Anthony Mason (Sunday Morning's FINE PRINT)			
2002	Douglas Smith (Sunday Morning's FINE PRINT)			
2003	The Mysterious Bookshop (Otto Penzler, owner)	bookstore; NYC		
2003	Book Carnival (Pat & Ed Thomas, owners)	bookstore; Orange, CA		
2003	Edgar Allan Poe Museum	museum; Richmond, VA		
2004	Ray and Pat Browne Library for Popular Culture Studies, Bowling Green University	library, collecting and preserving detective fiction; Bowling Green, OH		
2004	Vanity Fair	magazine, covering True Crime		
2005	Cape Cod Radio Mystery Theatre (Steve Oney, founder)	radio drama		
2005	DorothyL listserv (Diane Kovacs & Kara Robinson, co-founders)	online digest website		
2005	Murder by the Book (Martha Farrington, owner)	bookstore; Houston, TX		
2006	Black Orchid Bookshop (Bonnie Claeson & Joe Guglielmelli, owners)	bookstore; NYC		
2006	Men of Mystery Conference (Joan Hansen, founder)	convention for readers and aspiring writers		
2007	Books & Books Bookstore (Mitchell Kaplan, owner)	bookstore; Coral Gables, FL		
2007	Mystery Loves Company Bookstore (Kathy & Tom Harig)	bookstore; Baltimore, MD (founded 1991)		
2008	Center for the Book in the Library of Congress	state center promoting literacy and reading		
2008	Kate's Mystery Books (Kate Mattes)	bookstore; Cambridge, MA		
2009	Edgar Allan Poe Society	society for scholarly study of Poe		
2009	Edgar Allan Poe House	historical site; Baltimore, MD		
2010	International Mystery Writers Festival (Zev Buffman)	festival showcasing mystery plays, television, and film		
2010	Mystery Lovers Bookshop (Richard Goldman, Mary Alice Gorman)	bookstore; Oakmont, PA		
2011	Centuries & Sleuths Bookstore (Augie Aleksy)	bookstore; Forest Park, IL		
2011	Once Upon a Crime Bookstore (Pat Frovarp, Gary Shulze)	bookstore; Minneapolis, MN		
2012	M is for Mystery (Ed Kaufman)	bookstore; San Mateo, CA		
2012	Molly Weston	blogger; Meritorious Mysteries (defunct)		
2013	Oline Cogdill	mystery columnist, South Florida Sun Sentinel		
2013	Mysterious Galaxy Bookstore	bookstore; San Diego, CA		
2014	Aunt Agatha's Bookstore	bookstore; Ann Arbor, MI		
2015	Ruth & Jon Jordan: Crimespree Magazine	magazine		
2015	Magna Cum Murder (Kathryn Kennison, founder or director)	crime writing festival / conference		
2016	Margaret Kinsman	editor, Clues: A Journal of Detection		
2016	Sisters in Crime	crime writing association		
2017	Dru Ann Love	blogger, mystery books		
2018	The Raven Book Store	bookstore; Lawrence, KS		
2018	BOLO Books (Kristopher Zgorski, admin/owner)	blog website (centered around crime fiction)		
2019	Marilyn Stasio	mystery reviewer for The New York Times Book Review		
2020	Left Coast Crime	annual mystery convention		
2021	Malice Domestic	annual fan convention		
2022	Lesa Holstine	critic; reviewer for Library Journal		
2023	Crime Writers of Color			
2023	Eddie Muller	Noir Alley and The Film Noir Foundation		
2025	Face In A Book	bookstore; El Dorado Hills, CA		
2026	Book Passage	bookstore; Corte Madera, CA		
