= Divorce (disambiguation) =

Divorce is the legal ending of a marriage.

Divorce may also refer to:

== Film ==
- Divorce (1923 film), a silent drama starring Jane Novak
- Divorce (1945 film), a drama starring Kay Francis and Bruce Cabot
- Divorced (1943 film), a Mexican film
- Divorced (1951 film), a Swedish film
- A Divorce, a 1953 Mexican film
- The Divorce (1970 film), a comedy starring Vittorio Gassman and Anita Ekberg
- Le Divorce, a 2003 film by James Ivory
- Divorce: Not Between Husband and Wife, a 2003 Indian film
- Divorce (2023 film), an Indian Malayalam-language film

== Literature ==
- Divorce (novel), a 1943 Chinese novel by Lao She
- The Divorce (novel), a 2026 American novel by Freida McFadden
- At-Talaq or "Divorce", the 65th sura of the Qur'an

== Music ==
- The Divorce, a rock band based in Seattle, Washington, United States
- "D-I-V-O-R-C-E", a song by Tammy Wynette
  - D-I-V-O-R-C-E (album), an album by Tammy Wynette
- "D.I.V.O.R.C.E.", a song by Billy Connolly
- "Divorce (band)", alternative country band from Nottingham, UK

== Television ==
- The Divorce (TV series), a 2015 Australian television series
- Divorce (TV series), a 2016 HBO TV series
- "The Divorce", an episode of Curb Your Enthusiasm
- D.I.V.O.R.C.E. (Big Love), an episode of the American TV series Big Love

== See also ==
- Divorcee (disambiguation)
- Dvorce (disambiguation)
