= Freida McFadden =

American writer and physician (born 1980)

- Born: Sara Cohen; May 1, 1980 (age 46); New York City, U.S.
- Education: Harvard University; Stony Brook University
- Occupation: Author
- Writing career
- Pen name: Freida McFadden
- Years active: 2013–present
- Genres: Psychological thriller; domestic thriller; mystery
- Notable work: The Housemaid (2022)
- Website: freidamcfadden.com

Sara Cohen (born May 1, 1980), known by her pen name Freida McFadden, is an American author and neurologist. She is known for her psychological thriller novels. Since her debut in 2013, she has published 30 novels. The Housemaid (2022) became an international bestseller and was adapted into a 2025 feature film starring Amanda Seyfried and Sydney Sweeney.

== Early life and education ==
Sara Cohen was born on May 1, 1980, in New York City and grew up in midtown Manhattan. Her father was a psychiatrist and her mother was a podiatrist; they later divorced. She has one younger brother. She attended a competitive New York City high school.

Cohen went on to study mathematics at Harvard University. Later, she attended medical school at Stony Brook University. She pursued a career in medicine, while continuing to write fiction and submit manuscripts to publishers and literary agents.

== Career ==
After completing her medical training, she began self-publishing fiction under the pseudonym Freida McFadden. Her first novel, The Devil Wears Scrubs (2013), drew heavily on her experiences as a medical intern and was based, in part, on her observations from clinical training.

Her 2022 book The Housemaid was an international bestseller, and was adapted for Lionsgate Studios with Rebecca Sonnenshine writing the screenplay and Hidden Pictures' Todd Lieberman and Alex Young producing. It is directed by Paul Feig, and the cast includes Sydney Sweeney as Millie, Amanda Seyfried as Nina, Brandon Sklenar as Andrew, and Michele Morrone as Enzo. Filming began in January 2025, and it was released on December 19, 2025. The film earned almost $400 million at the box office, becoming the highest grossing film of Feig's career in its original run.

McFadden's audience extends beyond the anglosphere. Her success in France, for example, has been described as "dazzling" and a "tidal wave". Eight of the fifteen bestselling books in that country during 2025 were by McFadden, whose cumulative French sales reached 6.453 million units by the end of the same year. Two more McFadden novels were released in French translation in early 2026, bringing the total to ten, with others announced.

In 2026, Time named McFadden one of the 100 most influential people of the year.

== Reception ==
In its review of Ward D, Kirkus Reviews called the novel "a superior work in the hospital ward horror genre," praising McFadden's control of tension and stating that she doles out revelations "with such an expert hand that readers [...] may end up wondering who they themselves can trust." Reviewing The Intruder, Kirkus described the trademark formula that established McFadden's work, noting that she "lures readers in using a seemingly straightforward thriller premise before diving headfirst into a series of progressively seismic (and increasingly insane) twists."

Writer Sophia Mendonça argued that McFadden's greatest asset lies primarily in her architectural construction of suspense. According to Mendonça, McFadden is able to create shocking central plot twists that force the reader to reevaluate every previous page. Mendonça also points out that the surface of frantic suspense serves as a vehicle for McFadden to insert discussions about intimate partner violence, social class, and the stigmatization of mental illness.

In a review published on BookTrib, analyst Philip Zozzaro called the psychological thriller Dear Debbie as a "sinister delight" and "fiendishly clever," highlighting the character arc of the protagonist, who goes from a quiet advice columnist and mother to a "calculated avenger." Zozzaro praised the author for creating a "complex and clever antihero who possesses a fierce charisma." He underlines how McFadden manipulates the perceptions that other characters and the reader themselves have of the protagonist. Zozzaro compared her work to that of established authors in the suspense genre, such as Gillian Flynn and Alice Feeney.

== Personal life ==
Cohen lives outside Boston with her husband, two children, and cat.

== Works ==
=== Series ===
==== Dr. Jane McGill series ====
#	Title	Released	Ref.
1	The Devil Wears Scrubs	August 23, 2013	
2	The Devil You Know	May 28, 2017	

==== Prescription: Murder series ====
#	Title	Initial Release	Re-Released	Ref.
1	Dead Med	July 4, 2014*	June 27, 2024	
2	Brain Damage	April 30, 2016	August 18, 2026	

*Originally published under the title Suicide Med; later revised and re-released as Dead Med on June 27, 2024. The re-release date listed in the table refers to its later traditional publication by Poisoned Pen Press.

==== The Housemaid series ====
#	Title	Released	Ref.
1	The Housemaid	April 26, 2022	
2	The Housemaid's Secret	February 20, 2023	
3	The Housemaid Is Watching	June 11, 2024	

=== Standalone ===
Title	Initial Release*	Re-Released	Ref.
Baby City (co-written with Kelley Stoddard)	April 25, 2015		
The Surrogate Mother	October 10, 2018	August 19, 2025	
The Ex	February 18, 2019		
The Perfect Son	October 8, 2019	August 6, 2024	
The Wife Upstairs	March 23, 2020		
One by One	July 13, 2020	April 2, 2024	
Want to Know a Secret?	January 5, 2021	March 3, 2026	
The Locked Door	June 1, 2021	October 3, 2023	
Do Not Disturb	September 7, 2021	July 1, 2025	
Do You Remember?	January 10, 2022		
The Inmate	June 13, 2022	March 5, 2024	
Never Lie	September 19, 2022	December 5, 2023	
Ward D	May 8, 2023	March 4, 2025	
The Coworker	August 29, 2023		
The Teacher	February 6, 2024		
The Boyfriend	October 1, 2024		
The Crash	January 28, 2025		
The Tenant	May 6, 2025		
The Intruder	October 7, 2025		
Dear Debbie	January 27, 2026		
The Divorce	May 29, 2026		
The Witch	October 6, 2026		
The Sleepwalker	March 23, 2027		

*Initial release dates refer to initial self-publication by McFadden via Amazon Kindle Direct Publishing. Re-release dates indicate subsequent traditional publication through Poisoned Pen Press. Titles first published from late 2023 onwards were issued directly through traditional publishing and therefore do not have separate re-release dates.

=== Novellas ===
Title	Released	Ref.
The Gift: A Short Story	December 4, 2022	
The Widow's Husband's Secret Lie: A Satirical Novella	August 12, 2024	
The Housemaid’s Wedding	November 22, 2024	
Death Row	June 1, 2025	
The Dinner Party: A Pick Your Poison Adventure	April 1, 2026	

=== Edited anthologies ===
Title	Released	Ref.
11 out of 10: A Collection of Humorous Medical Short Stories	September 30, 2015	

== Awards ==
- 2023 International Thriller Writers Award for Best Paperback Original Novel for The Housemaid
- 2023 Goodreads Choice Award for Best Mystery & Thriller for The Housemaid's Secret
