= Car Crash =

A traffic collision, also known as a car crash, is when one or more cars crash into something.

Informally, a car crash may also refer to something or someone that has suffered ruin or a calamity.

Car Crash or Carcrash may also refer to:

- "Car Crash" (Matt Nathanson song), on the album Some Mad Hope
- "Car Crash" (Our Lady Peace song), on the album Clumsy
- "Car Crash" (Powerman 5000 song), on the album The Blood-Splat Rating System
- "Car Crash" (Avengers song), on the EP We Are the One
- "Car Crash" (Dirty Americans song), a song by Dirty Americans
- Carcrash International, an English rock music group
- "Carcrash" (Esbjörn Svensson Trio song), on the album Strange Place for Snow
- "Carcrash" (Section 25 song), on the album Love & Hate
- Car Crash (film), a 1981 Italian-Spanish-Mexican action film

== See also ==
- Car (disambiguation)
- Crash (disambiguation)
