= Green Monster (novel) =

2008 novel by Rick Shefchik

- Author: Rick Shefchik
- Publisher: Poisoned Pen Press
- Publication date: September 1, 2008
- ISBN: 978-1-59058-524-5

Green Monster is a 2008 novel by American author Rick Shefchik. It was published August 1 by Poisoned Pen Press.

A mystery/thriller set initially in Boston, Massachusetts, it follows the former Minneapolis police detective, now private investigator, Sam Skarda, as he is called in by the owner of the Boston Red Sox to investigate an anonymous note that claims the 2004 World Series was fixed. It is the second in a series about Skarda and his adventures investigating crime in the sports world. The first, Amen Corner came out in March 2007.
