= Harold Augenbraum =

American writer, editor, and translator (b. 1953)

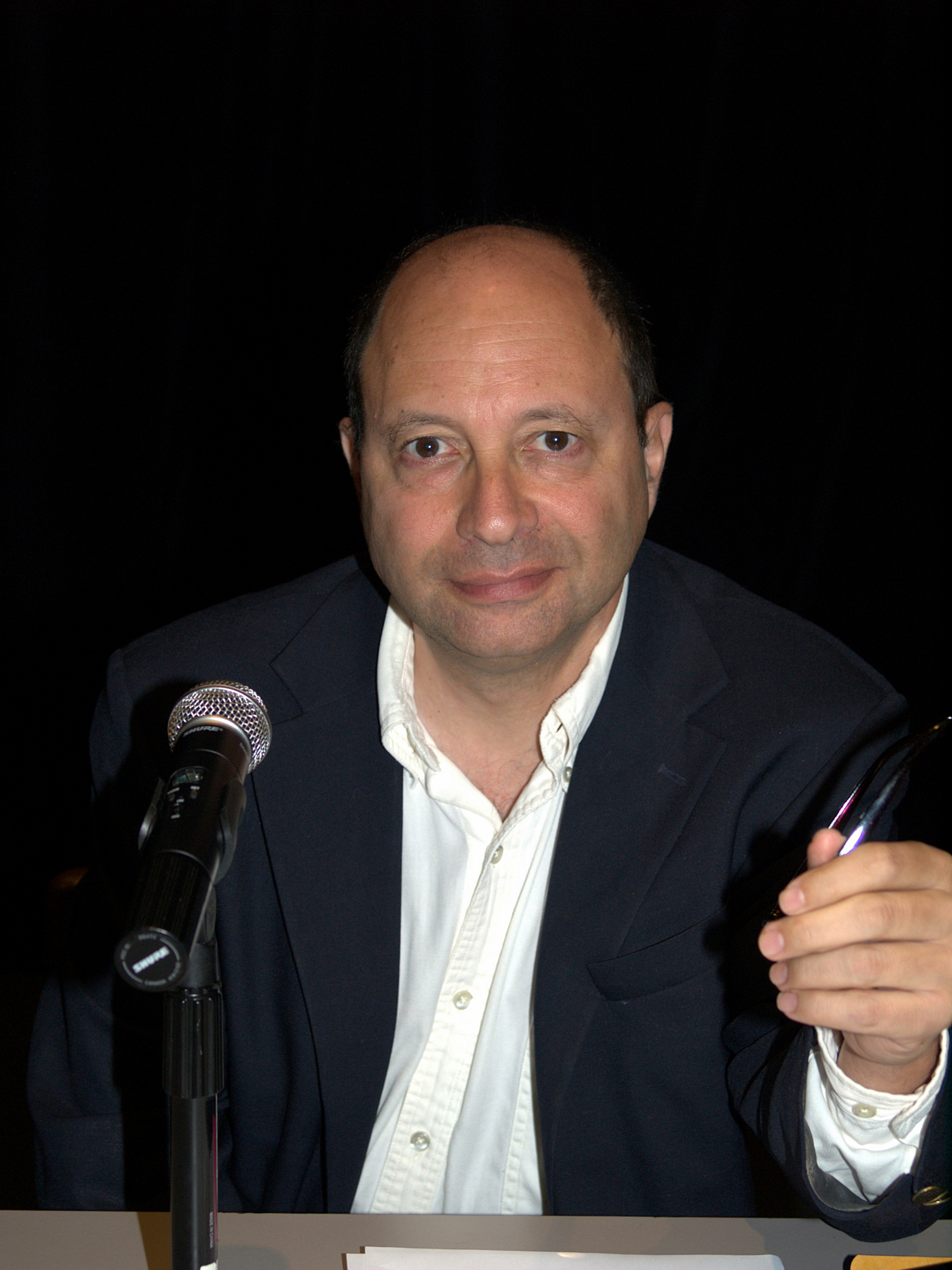
Augenbraum at the 2010 Brooklyn Book Festival.

Harold Augenbraum (born March 31, 1953) is an American writer, editor, and translator. He is the former Executive Director of the National Book Foundation, and former member of the Board of Trustees of the Asian American Writers Workshop, and former vice chair of the New York Council for the Humanities. Before taking up his position at the National Book Foundation in November 2004, for fifteen years Augenbraum was Director of The Mercantile Library of New York (now the Center for Fiction), where he established the Center for World Literature, the New York Festival of Mystery, the Clifton Fadiman Medal, and the Proust Society of America. He has been awarded eight grants from the National Endowment for the Humanities, received a Raven Award from the Mystery Writers of America for distinguished service to the mystery field, and coordinated the national celebration of the John Steinbeck Centennial. He is on the advisory board of the literary magazine The Common, based at Amherst College. In 2016, he was awarded an honorary doctorate from Concordia College in Moorhead, Minnesota. In 2017, Augenbraum was named a Franke Fellow at Yale University, where he co-founded, with Alice Kaplan, the Yale Translation Initiative. From 2017 to 2019, Augenbraum was Acting Editor of The Yale Review.

== Books edited or translated ==
- 2013—Alvar Núñez Cabeza de Vaca, Narrative of the Narváez Expedition, edited
- 2013—Marcel Proust, Collected Poems, edited with an Introduction by
- 2012—Juan Rulfo, The Plain in Flames (El Llano en llamas), translated by Ilan Stavans and Harold Augenbraum
- 2011—José Rizal, El Filibusterismo, edited, translated, and with an Introduction by
- 2010 -- The Norton Anthology of Latino Literature, General Editor, Ilan Stavans, co- editor, Harold Augenbraum, et al.
- 2006 -- Lengua Fresca: Latinos on the Edge, edited with Ilan Stavans
- 2006—José Rizal, Noli Me Tángere (1887), translation
- 2005 -- Encyclopedia Latina, general editor, Ilan Stavans, associate editor, Harold Augenbraum.
- 2002—Alvar Núñez Cabeza de Vaca, Chronicle of the Narváez Expedition, revised translation
- 2002 -- How to Organize a Steinbeck Book or Film Discussion Group, with Susan Shillinglaw
- 2000 -- U.S. Latino Literature: A Critical Guide for Students and Teachers, edited with Margarite Fernandez-Olmos
- 1997 -- The Latino Reader: An American Literary Tradition from 1542 to the Present Day, edited with Margarite Fernandez-Olmos
- 1993 -- Growing Up Latino: Memoirs and Stories, with Ilan Stavans
- 1993 -- Bendíceme, América, with Terry Quinn and Ilan Stavans
- 1992 -- Latinos in English: A Selected Bibliography of Latino Fiction Writers of the United States, edited
