= Hot Wheels Micro Racers =

2000 video game

- Cover art featuring Screamin' Hauler, Deora II, Semi-Fast and Whatta Drag
- Developer: Unique Development Studios
- Publishers: Mattel Interactive; THQ
- Producer: Jonathan Correa
- Composer: Christian Björklund
- Platform: Microsoft Windows
- Release: NA: April 28, 2000
- Genre: Racing
- Modes: Single-player; Multiplayer

Hot Wheels Micro Racers is a racing video game developed by Unique Development Studios (UDS) and published by Mattel Interactive for Microsoft Windows. The game is based on the Hot Wheels toyline, and was unveiled at the American International Toy Fair in February 2000, as a competitor to Micro Machines. Hot Wheels Micro Racers was released on April 28, 2000, and came packaged with a free Hot Wheels car and poster.

== Gameplay ==
Hot Wheels Micro Racers features mini Hot Wheels vehicles as the game's playable and computer-controlled racers, with gameplay consisting of arcade-style racing. The game features three race tracks, each one with their own unique hazards and obstacles: an office, a child's bedroom, and a beach. Three gameplay modes are featured: Single, Championship, and Pursuit. In Single mode, the player can choose any track on which to race. In Championship, the player must finish each race in first place in order to advance to the next race. Pursuit consists of a single race with three laps; the racer in last place explodes at the end of each lap, with the final remaining car being the winner.

The player begins with two vehicles, while five more can be unlocked by completing championship races, and by finding secret areas and hidden stars in each track. Each vehicle is based on a real Hot Wheels toy, and each one has different handling characteristics, such as top speed and acceleration. A turbo boost can be used by the player to temporarily speed up, but must recharge after each use. The game includes a two-player option, in which both players play on a split screen.

== Reception ==
Reception

Review scores
Publication	Score
AllGame	2.5/5
GameSpot	6.2/10
IGN	6.2/10
PC Gamer (UK)	35%
PC Zone	2.2/10

Scott Steinberg of IGN criticized the game's limited number of race tracks and wrote: "Tracks, designed to look gigantic in relation to your puny Hot Wheels racer, are neither complex nor lengthy". Steinberg praised the graphics but wrote that the game "would be considered less than half of a completed game under normal circumstances. Hot Wheels: Micro Racers looks sporty and plays like a charm, yet it serves up the same amount of longevity as a 'desktop diversion'".

Trey Walker of GameSpot criticized the game's "disappointing anticlimax", writing that "aside from unlocking the hidden cars, there's no way to make a record of your racing success - there's no Hall of Fame to let you record your name on a high-score table or anything of the sort. As it stands, the only reward for winning at the pro level is that you get dumped back to the main menu". Walker praised the game's graphics, and called the tracks "well detailed", but wrote that a larger number of tracks "would have been a welcome addition, but to the game's credit, its few tracks do feature a number of interesting shortcuts and secret areas". Walker noted the game's simple sound effects, and also wrote: "The background music is pleasant and upbeat, but it gets old after a few races". Walker concluded that the game was "a modest value", and wrote that it "provides a fun and enjoyable arcade-style racing experience from a toy-sized perspective".

PC Gamer criticized the game for its "mediocrity", writing that it would only be worth playing "in an world where Micro Machines doesn't exist". Anthony Baize of AllGame wrote that the game "starts out well but quickly devolves into a repetitive, boring experience. Featuring flashy graphics and high-intensity sound, the game fails to reach its high potential due to a limited number of tracks and extremely difficult gameplay". Baize felt that Hot Wheels: Crash! was a superior choice for Hot Wheels fans. Steve Hill of PC Zone called the game a "second-rate imitation" of Micro Machines and advised against purchasing it "because disappointment is inevitable".
