= Temple (film) =

- Directed by: Michael Barrett
- Written by: Simon Barrett
- Produced by: Eric Bassett; Neal Edelstein; Shinya Egawa; Mike Macari
- Starring: Logan Huffman; Natalia Warner; Brandon Tyler Sklenar
- Cinematography: Cory Geryak
- Edited by: Micah Stuart; Sean Valla
- Music by: Edmund Butt
- Production companies: Industrial Entertainment; Genre Project Inc.; Crow Island Films; Koji Productions
- Distributed by: Screen Media Films
- Release date: September 1, 2017
- Running time: 78 minutes
- Countries: Japan; United States
- Languages: English; Japanese
- Budget: $3.4 million

Temple is a 2017 horror film directed by Michael Barrett (in his directorial debut) and written by Simon Barrett. Logan Huffman, Natalia Warner, and Brandon Tyler Sklenar star as Americans who visit Japan to research local temples. Once there, they become obsessed with investigating a temple said to be haunted. It is an international co-production between the United States and Japan.

== Plot ==
In Japan, a professor and his interpreter question a wounded and bandaged man. Both ask questions of each other that go unanswered. When the professor plays a videotape, the wounded man flashes back to before he was injured.

Kate, a university student studying comparative religion, invites her friend Chris, who is recovering from the loss of his brother, to join her in a trip to Japan, where she intends to study local temples. Kate's boyfriend, James, though surprised to find Kate and Chris have been platonic friends since childhood, says he is not jealous of their relationship. Chris, who speaks some Japanese, translates for the group when they arrive in Japan. After engaging in sight-seeing, they stop at a book store. Kate finds a book of Japanese folklore and becomes intrigued by a temple depicted in it. When Chris attempts to purchase the book, the proprietor abruptly refuses to sell it and closes her shop. Confused, the trio return to their hotel. Later that night, Chris and James visit a club, where Chris sees James kiss and dance with other women.

Upon leaving the club, Chris returns to the bookstore, where he comes upon a young boy, Seita, who claims to work there. After Seita sells him the folklore book, Chris experiences several strange encounters, feeling that something is stalking him. At a bar, a man tells him that the temple depicted in the book is nearby but is rumored to be haunted, and the bartender gives him directions to a village near the temple. Though they warn him to stay away, Chris presents the book to Kate, who becomes excited to visit it; James is less enthused. They at first have trouble finding a villager that will talk to them, but one tells them of a man named Hitoshi, who returned from a trip to the temple blind and claiming to have had visions. The trio at first laugh off the stories.

Chris gets them a room at an inn, where he comes upon Seita again. Seita, who says he lives in the village, offers to take them to the temple the next day. After agreeing, Chris sees an eyeless man; he identifies himself as Hitoshi and reveals that 50 years ago, several children went missing. The villagers found a monk at the temple, and, not believing his story, killed him. That night, Chris watches Kate and James as they have sex until he becomes convinced he has seen someone outside his room. James is annoyed at both the commotion Chris causes and that Chris has apparently been spying on them. The next day, Seita leads them to the temple. Along the way, they find an abandoned mine, which James wants to explore. He reluctantly leaves it so they can reach the temple before dark.

Seita leaves for home shortly after they arrive. The temple is guarded by the statue of a kitsune, a legendary fox-human hybrid. James is disappointed in the temple but agrees to let Kate explore it. After being spooked by something in the forest while examining a nearby graveyard, she agrees they should leave. Before they can, hands pull Chris through a wooden floor, and he breaks his leg. James makes a splint and promises to return to town for help in the morning. However, when James overhears a conversation between Chris and Kate in which she alludes to having had an abortion without telling James, he leaves immediately. Chris and Kate cuddle together until Kate hears James cry out in the distance.

A kitsune chases after James. Following his cries, Kate returns to the mine, only to find him disfigured and eyeless. When she flees, she discovers the mine's entrance has collapsed, trapping her. At the same time, the missing children attack Chris at the temple. In the present, the bandaged man, whom the professor believes to be Chris, denies having killed Kate and James, despite evidence from Chris' camera, which apparently shows him attacking James. The bandaged man becomes enraged when they deny that Seita is there with them, and he stabs the translator with a pen before escaping the room.

== Cast ==
- Logan Huffman as Chris and the bandaged man, identified as "Faceless" in the credits
- Natalia Warner as Kate
- Brandon Tyler Sklenar as James, Kate's boyfriend
- Yamato Tazawa as Seita
- Soukyu Fujita as Hitoshi
- Naoto Takenaka as Professor Ryo
- Asahi Uchida as Kazunori Ittoku, the translator

== Release ==
Screen Media Films released it in the United States on September 1, 2017.

=== Critical response ===
Critical reception for Temple has been mostly negative upon its release.

Justin Low of The Hollywood Reporter wrote that the film "comes off as more of a half-hearted attempt at exploiting typical J-horror themes than an actual homage". Writing for the Los Angeles Times, Kimber Myers said that the film has some nice visuals but offers nothing new. Ed Gonzalez of Slant Magazine rated it one out of five stars and called it a "walking tour of J-horror's hoariest signposts" that might have been better had Simon Barrett's regular partner, Adam Wingard, directed it. Ryan Larson of Nightmarish Conjurings gave the film a negative review, writing, "Although the movie is very clearly filled with good intentions, it misses the mark. It can't quite decide how scary it wants to be, what monsters it wants to use, it can't even decide which character it wants the female lead to end up with." Matt Boiselle from Dread Central awarded the film one and a half out of five stars, panning the film's slow pacing, lack of suspense, and conclusion. Simon Abrams from Roger Ebert.com gave the film a "Thumbs down", calling the film "dull and misconceived", and panning the film's pacing, plot, ineffective scares, "boring" characters, and cinematography. Jake Dee of Arrow in the Head rated the film a score of four out of ten, calling it "a boring, underdone conjuration of worn out J-horror convention".
