= Frederick Ramsay =

American academic, priest and writer (died 2017)

- Born: Baltimore, Maryland, United States
- Died: 2017; Arizona, United States
- Education: Washington and Lee University, University of Illinois, University of Maryland School of Medicine
- Occupations: academic, Episcopal priest, writer
- Known for: priest to 2 parishes in Baltimore, writing a series of mystery novels
- Notable work: see Publications
- Spouse(s): unnamed; Susan Ramsay
- Children: 2 sons. 1 daughter; 1 son, 2 daughters

Frederick Ramsay (died 2017) was an American academic, priest and writer. After serving in the US Army, he taught at the University Maryland, became an Episcopal priest in his native Baltimore, and wrote a series of mystery novels.

== Early life and education ==
Frederick Ramsay was born in Baltimore, Maryland. His father was a scientist and his mother was a teacher. He was raised on the East Coast.

He graduated from Washington and Lee University in 1958, then received a doctorate in anatomy from the University of Illinois in 1962. While working at the University of Maryland School of Medicine, he received a graduate degree in theology.

== Career ==
Throughout his life, Ramsay held many jobs, including as a tow man, a line supervisor at the BWI airport of Baltimore, insurance salesman, instructor at a community college, a substitute teacher and host of the "Prognosis" feature on the evening news for WMAR, an ABC affiliate in Baltimore.

Following university, Ramsay joined the Army for a brief period, then joined the faculty of the University of Maryland School of Medicine, where he taught histology, embryology and anatomy. He was also a researcher and later became the associate dean of the school of medicine. He was later the vice president for public affairs of the Sheppard and Enoch Pratt Hospital, one of the oldest private psychiatric hospitals in the nation.

In 1971, he was ordained as a priest in the Episcopal Church. He served two parishes in the Baltimore area.

Following retirement, Ramsay began writing novels. His first novel, Artscape, was published in 2004 by Poisoned Pen Press. It became the first in the Ike Schwarz Mystery series, which was centered around a small town Virginia sheriff. Other series include the Jerusalem Mystery historical fiction series (2007–2014) and the Botswana Mystery series (2009–2016). He also wrote a few standalone novels.

== Personal life ==
Ramsay had three children in his first marriage: Jeff, Eleanor and Matt. He later married Susan Ramsay, with whom he had three children: Julie, Karen and Sam.

In 2000, Ramsay retired with Susan in Surprise, Arizona.

On August 23, 2017, Ramsay died in Arizona from an aggressive recurrence of kidney cancer.

== Publications ==
=== Schwartz Mystery series ===
- Artscape (2004)
- Secrets (2005)
- Buffalo Mountain (2007)
- Stranger Room (2008)
- Choker (2008)
- The Eye of the Virgin (2010)
- Rogue (2011)
- Scone Island (2012)
- Drowning Barbie (2014)
- The Vulture (2015)

=== Jerusalem Mystery series ===
- The Eighth Veil (2012)
- Holy Smoke (2013)
- The Wolf and the Lamb (2014)

=== Sutherlin Mystery series ===
- Copper Kettle (2017)
- Countdown (2018)

=== Standalone novels ===
- Impulse (2006)
- Judas: The Gospel of Betrayal (2007, 2010)
- Predators (2009)
- Reapers (2010)
- Danger Woman (2016)
