= The Housemaid (2025 film) =

2025 film by Paul Feig

- Theatrical release poster
- Directed by: Paul Feig
- Screenplay by: Rebecca Sonnenshine
- Based on: The Housemaid by Freida McFadden
- Produced by: Todd Lieberman; Laura Fischer; Paul Feig
- Starring: Sydney Sweeney; Amanda Seyfried; Brandon Sklenar
- Cinematography: John Schwartzman
- Edited by: Brent White
- Music by: Theodore Shapiro
- Production companies: Hidden Pictures; Pretty Dangerous Pictures
- Distributed by: Lionsgate
- Release dates: December 2, 2025 (Axa Equitable Center); December 19, 2025 (United States)
- Running time: 131 minutes
- Country: United States
- Language: English
- Budget: $35 million
- Box office: $400.5 million

The Housemaid is a 2025 American erotic psychological thriller film directed by Paul Feig and written by Rebecca Sonnenshine. It is based on the 2022 novel by Freida McFadden, and stars Sydney Sweeney and Amanda Seyfried. In the film, Millie Calloway, a young woman with a troubled past, becomes the live-in maid for a wealthy family whose household hides dark secrets.

The Housemaid premiered at the Axa Equitable Center in New York City on December 2, 2025, and was released in the United States by Lionsgate on December 19. The film received generally positive reviews from critics and grossed $400.5 million on a budget of $35 million. A sequel is in development, with Feig and Sweeney set to return and scheduled for release on December 17, 2027.

== Plot ==
Recently paroled Millie Calloway is hired by Nina Winchester as a live-in maid in a Great Neck, Long Island mansion, with Nina's wealthy husband Andrew and daughter Cece. She is given an attic bedroom with a sealed window and a door with an outside lock. Nina is supposedly hiring because she is pregnant and needs help around the house. As a parolee, Millie must maintain lawful employment.

Nina becomes increasingly hostile toward Millie, accusing her of mistakes and threatening to fire her over seemingly innocent interactions with Andrew. Apologizing for her erratic behavior, Nina instructs Millie to book Broadway musical tickets and a hotel for the Winchesters, but later denies it, as the schedule overlaps with Cece's ballet camp. While Nina takes her to camp, Andrew and Millie secretly attend the show, enjoy dinner together, and check into the hotel. Receiving many seething texts from Nina, Andrew comforts Millie, they have sex and return home.

Nina tells Millie she knows about her ten years in prison, confronts them about their affair and threatens Millie. Andrew defends Millie, demanding Nina leave. The two continue their romance, while Nina, after initially being visibly upset, appears relieved and happy to be separated from Andrew.

Millie makes Andrew breakfast on an heirloom china plate from his controlling mother, but is startled by the groundskeeper Enzo outside and accidentally smashes it. Andrew fires Enzo, telling Millie to pick up the pieces. That night, he takes her to the attic room, drugs her, and locks her inside. When Millie wakes up, she demands to be freed, but Andrew refuses.

Nina writes Cece a letter for when she is grown, explaining she did not cause her parents' deaths. As a college student, Nina got pregnant by a married law professor, and then fell for Andrew while raising Cece as a single mother. When Nina missed an appointment to dye her roots blonde, Andrew locked her in the attic room until she pulled out 100 hairs from her scalp, as punishment. Andrew then drugged her, framing her for attempting to drown Cece and drugging herself, and continued to torment her with confinement in a psychiatric hospital and the attic. Nina secretly had an IUD inserted, feigning premature ovarian insufficiency as the excuse for why she struggled to get pregnant.

Enzo tried unsuccessfully to help Nina and Cece escape Andrew's abuse. Finally, Nina hired Millie, hoping Andrew would leave her. She is exactly Andrew's type: young, pretty, lonely and troubled.

As punishment for breaking the china, Andrew gives Millie a shard, demanding she cut her stomach 21 times. Once finished, Millie falls asleep. When Andrew enters the room, she stabs him with a knife Nina provided, then locks him inside. Millie orders Andrew to pull out one of his front teeth with pliers. He initially completely refuses, but to force Andrew to comply, as Millie observes him on a monitor, she breaks more of his mother's china and threatens to burn the attic. She reveals her 10-year incarceration was for beating her roommate's rapist to death. When Nina picks up Cece from camp, Cece suggests she save Millie.

Nina sneaks into the attic, believing Millie is still inside. Andrew attacks both women, but Millie escapes. He tries to convince Nina to take him back, but she refuses. He then tries to kill her, but Millie returns and pushes him into the stairwell, killing him. Nina drops a lightbulb to make it look as if Andrew fell while trying to install it. Telling Millie to run away, she calls Enzo to help clean up the scene.

Policewoman Jessica Connors finds the evidence and Nina's statement unconvincing. However, her sister was traumatized when once engaged to Andrew, so she reports his death as a freak accident. After Andrew's funeral, Nina gives Millie $100,000, then leaves with Cece to start over in California. Nina recommends Millie's services to her friend Lisa, who implies that her husband is abusive. Millie happily accepts the job.

== Cast ==
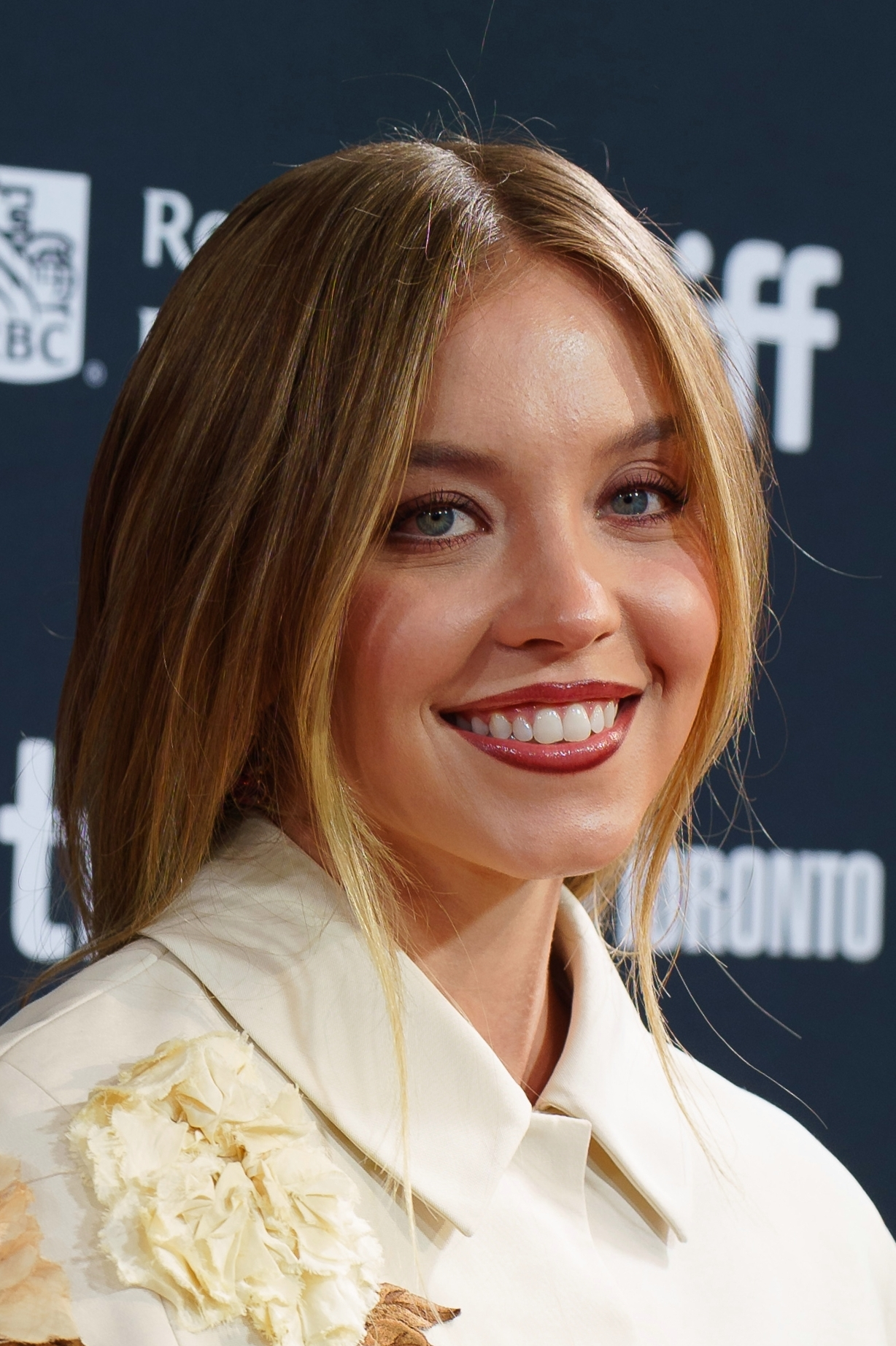
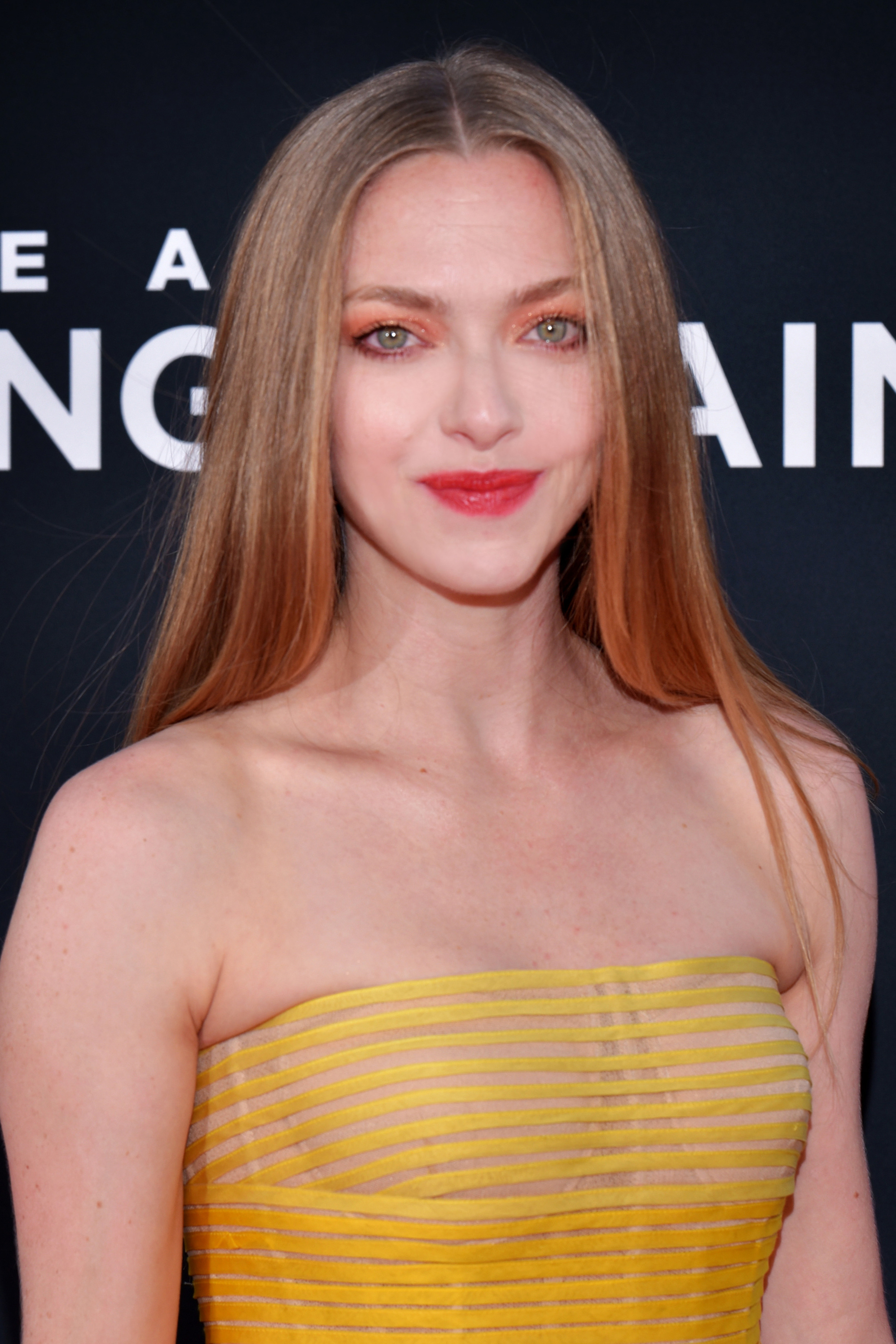
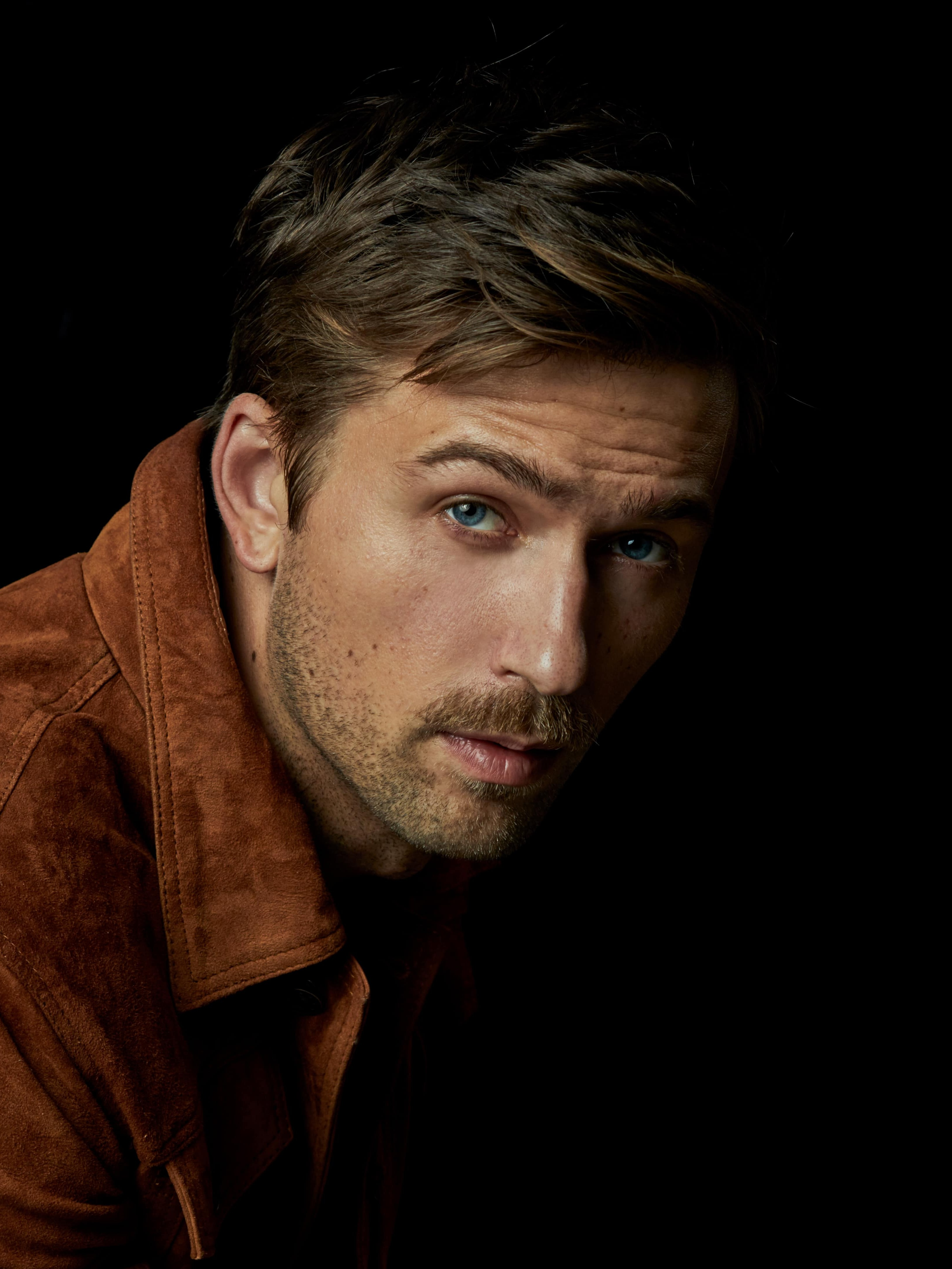
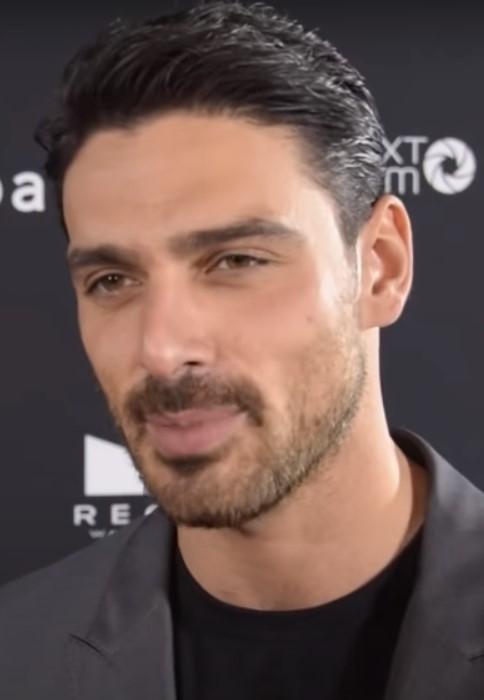
The film stars Sydney Sweeney, Amanda Seyfried, Brandon Sklenar, and Michele Morrone.
- Sydney Sweeney as Wilhelmina "Millie" Calloway, a housemaid with a criminal record
- Amanda Seyfried as Nina Winchester, a wealthy woman who hires Millie
  - Arabella Olivia Clark as young Nina
- Brandon Sklenar as Andrew Winchester, Nina's husband
- Michele Morrone as Enzo Accardi, an Italian groundskeeper
- Elizabeth Perkins as Evelyn Winchester, Andrew's mother
- Indiana Elle as Cecelia "Cece" Winchester, Nina's daughter
  - Hope Grant as infant Cece
- Amanda Joy Erickson as Suzanne, a local housewife
- Megan Ferguson as Jilianne, a local housewife
- Ellen Tamaki as Patrice, a local housewife
- Don DiPetta as Officer Jenkins
- Lamar B. Slaughter as Officer Stanley
- Alaina Surgener as Amanda, a local housemaid
- Alexandra Seal as Jessica Connors, a policewoman
- Brian D. Cohen as Detective Smythe
- Hannah Cruz as Lexi
- Ellen Adair as Lisa Killefer, a wealthy woman who interviews Millie in the epilogue

== Production ==
Paul Feig directed The Housemaid and produced it with Todd Lieberman and Laura Fischer for Hidden Pictures. Rebecca Sonnenshine adapted her screenplay from the 2022 novel by Freida McFadden. In October 2024, Sydney Sweeney and Amanda Seyfried came on board as leading actresses and executive producers alongside McFadden and Alex Young. Seyfried was not aware she was credited as an executive producer until three weeks into production; she claimed that this credit was a “vanity credit" negotiated by her agent and clarified that she "didn't do shit to make that movie. I only acted." Brandon Sklenar joined the cast that month followed by Michele Morrone in December 2024. Elizabeth Perkins was also cast in the film. Media Capital Technologies co-financed the film.

Principal photography began on January 3, 2025, in New Jersey, and wrapped in March 2025.

Theodore Shapiro composed the film's score, marking his eighth collaboration with Feig.

Commercial songs that were featured in the film, but not included in the soundtrack album:

- "Take Me as I Am" – Lyn Lapid
- "Tumbling Dice" – Linda Ronstadt
- "Why Is She Still Here?" – Reneé Rapp
- "Cinnamon Girl" – Lana Del Rey
- "To the Sky" – Clare and Oliver Manchon
- "La Ballade" – Clare and Oliver Manchon, Aaron Goldberg, Larry Grenadier, Loston Harris and Matt Munisteri
- "Bad as the Rest" – Jessie Murph
- "Breaking News" – Flowerovlove
- "Since U Been Gone" – Kelly Clarkson
- "Blue Bayou" – Linda Ronstadt
- "German Dance No. 1 in C Major" – from Barry Lyndon
- "I Did Something Bad" – Taylor Swift
- "The Angel and the Saint" – Goldie Boutilier

== Release ==
The Housemaid premiered at the Axa Equitable Center on December 2, 2025, and was released in the United States on December 19, 2025. The film was released on VOD on February 3, 2026, and on DVD, Blu-ray and Ultra HD Blu-ray on March 17, 2026.

== Reception ==
=== Box office ===
The Housemaid grossed $126.4 million in the United States and Canada, and $274.1 million in other territories, for a worldwide total of $400.5 million.

In the United States and Canada, The Housemaid was released alongside Avatar: Fire and Ash, The SpongeBob Movie: Search for SquarePants, and David, and was projected to gross $20–25 million from 3,015 theaters in its opening weekend. The film made $8 million on its first day, including $2.3 million from Thursday night previews. It went on to debut to $19 million, finishing in third behind Fire and Ash and David. It held well in its second weekend, dropping just 19.5% to $15.3 million and finishing in fourth. The film made $15.1 million, $10.1 million, and $8.5 million in its third, fourth, and fifth weekends.

=== Critical response ===
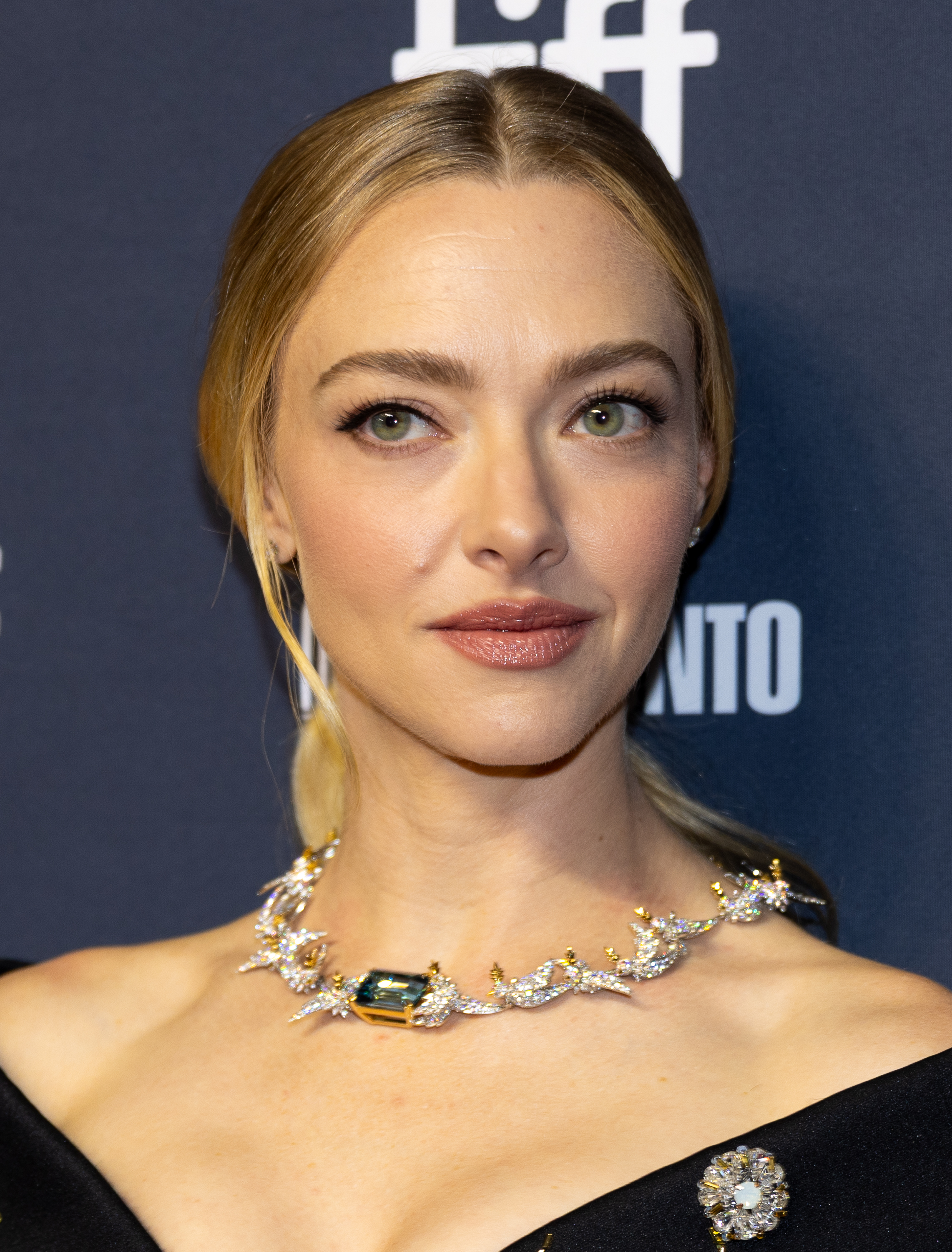
Amanda Seyfried was praised for her performance.

On the review aggregator website Rotten Tomatoes, 74% of 202 critics' reviews are positive, with an average rating of 6.3/10. The website's consensus reads: "A sly throwback to the lurid thrillers that used to dominate multiplexes, The Housemaid cleans up nicely thanks to its wicked sense of fun and a delightfully unnerving performance from Amanda Seyfried." Metacritic, which uses a weighted average, assigned the film a score of 65 out of 100, based on 35 critics, indicating "generally favorable" reviews. Audiences polled by CinemaScore gave the film an average grade of "B" on an A+ to F scale, while those surveyed by PostTrak gave it an 84% overall positive score, with 63% saying they would definitely recommend the film.

TheWrap's William Bibbiani gave the film a positive review and wrote, "The Housemaid has its twists, and you'll probably see some of them coming a mile off, even if you don't know exactly how the secrets will be revealed or what form the danger will take. On more than one occasion, the twist is that The Housemaid is even weirder and funnier than you expect — and that's a welcome surprise." Tim Robey of The Daily Telegraph gave a four stars rating out of five for the film, stating, "This is a full-tilt throwback to 'erotic thriller' tropes from the 1990s." Kyle Smith of The Wall Street Journal wrote, "The Housemaid is a delightful hall of mirrors in which reality turns out to be subject to infinite modification." Marta Medina del Valle of El Confidencial rated the "post-postmodern artifact" 4 out of 5 stars, declaring it the "best worst movie" of recent times.

In a negative review for Slant Magazine, Anzhe Zhang wrote, "The Housemaid's twist is a doozy, but it falls just short of being a deconstruction of tradwife values."

=== Accolades ===
Award	Date of ceremony	Category	Recipient(s)	Result	Ref.
Astra Film Awards	January 9, 2026	Best Book to Screen Adaptation	The Housemaid	Won	
Columbus Film Critics Association	January 8, 2026	Actor of the Year (Note: For an Exemplary Body of Work, also for The Testament of Ann Lee)	Amanda Seyfried	Nominated	
Hawaii Film Critics Society	January 12, 2026	Best Supporting Actress	Amanda Seyfried	Nominated	
Michigan Movie Critics Guild	December 8, 2025	The MMCG Award for Film Excellence	Paul Feig (Note: Director, also for Another Simple Favor)	Nominated	
New Jersey Film Critics Circle	December 31, 2025	Best New Jersey Representation	The Housemaid	Nominated	
Saturn Awards	March 8, 2026	Best Thriller Movie	The Housemaid	Nominated	

== Sequel ==
In January 2026, Lionsgate announced that a sequel had been greenlit, with Feig, Sweeney and Morrone returning. The sequel is set to be an adaptation of The Housemaid's Secret, the second book in The Housemaid series by Freida McFadden.

In March 2026, Lionsgate Studios announced that the sequel will be released on December 17, 2027, with Kirsten Dunst added to the cast. In June 2026, Paul Anthony Kelly joined the cast. In August 2026, Brittany Snow and Stephen Kalyn joined the cast.

Principal photography began in October 2026, with Sweeney and Morrone shooting on location in Hoboken, New Jersey.
