= Rick Shefchik =

American writer

- Born: May 9, 1952 (age 74); Duluth, Minnesota, U.S.
- Education: Dartmouth College
- Occupations: Novelist; writer; journalist
- Writing career
- Genre: Non-fiction
- Website: www.rickshefchik.com

Rick Shefchik (born May 9, 1952) is an American novelist, nonfiction writer, and journalist. He is the author of the novels Amen Corner, published in 2007, Green Monster, published August 1, 2008 by Poisoned Pen Press, Frozen Tundra, published in 2010 by North Star Press and Rather See You Dead, e-published in 2011. 2012 saw the release of his first book of nonfiction, From Fields to Fairways: Classic Golf Clubs of Minnesota (University of Minnesota Press). In 2015, he released Everybody's Heard About the Bird: The True Story of 1960s Rock 'n' Roll in Minnesota (University of Minnesota Press). In September 2023, he and musician Paul Metsa released "Blood in the Tracks," a work of historical nonfiction centered on the Minnesota musicians who played on Bob Dylan’s 1975 album Blood on the Tracks. It was published by the U of M Press.

== Fiction ==
A mystery/thriller set at the Masters Tournament of golf, Amen Corner centers on Minneapolis police detective and amateur golfer Sam Skarda, as he competes in his first Masters and hunts for a crazed killer determined to put an end to the tournament. It is the first in a series about Skarda and his adventures investigating crime in the sports world. The second, Green Monster, has Skarda traveling to the East Coast in response to an anonymous note received by the owner of the Boston Red Sox, claiming the 2004 World Series was fixed. Frozen Tundra concerns Skarda's attempts to prevent the Green Bay Packers football team from being sold to a private owner, which somebody is murdering various board members to try to bring about. Rather See You Dead is a thriller about the contemporary repercussions of a possible meeting between Elvis Presley and John Lennon in 1960.

== Journalism career ==
From 1993 to 2004, he wrote the weekly syndicated newspaper column "Go Ask Dad", which appeared in the Saint Paul Pioneer Press and other papers nationwide. The column offered an offbeat, warm and often humorous take on fatherhood. The column's insights won it numerous awards, including from the National Society for Newspaper Columnists (First Place, Humor, 1999), and the Minnesota Society of Professional Journalists Page One Award. He also contributed to two projects that won the Frank Premack Public Affairs Journalism Award from the Minnesota Journalism Center at the University of Minnesota.

== Life ==
Born in Duluth, Minnesota, he graduated from Dartmouth College. After working in public relations and as a full-time musician, he began his journalism career at the Duluth News Tribune in 1978. After moving to the Pioneer Press, he worked as a sportswriter, television critic and music critic before the creation of "Go Ask Dad". In 2006, he left the newspaper to become a full-time novelist.
