= Drop (film) =

2025 film by Christopher Landon

- Theatrical release poster
- Directed by: Christopher Landon
- Written by: Jillian Jacobs; Chris Roach
- Produced by: Michael Bay; Brad Fuller; Cameron Fuller; Jason Blum
- Starring: Meghann Fahy; Brandon Sklenar; Violett Beane; Jeffery Self
- Cinematography: Marc Spicer
- Edited by: Ben Baudhuin
- Music by: Bear McCreary
- Production companies: Blumhouse Productions; Platinum Dunes
- Distributed by: Universal Pictures
- Release dates: March 9, 2025 (SXSW); April 11, 2025 (United States)
- Running time: 95 minutes
- Country: United States
- Language: English
- Budget: $11 million
- Box office: $28.7 million

Drop is a 2025 American mystery thriller film directed by Christopher Landon and written by Jillian Jacobs and Chris Roach. It stars Meghann Fahy, Brandon Sklenar, Violett Beane, and Jeffery Self. In the film, a widowed mother receives threatening messages during her first date in years, which causes her to question her date and fear for her safety.

Drop had its premiere at the SXSW on March 9, 2025, and was released in the United States by Universal Pictures on April 11, 2025. The film received generally positive reviews from critics and grossed $28 million worldwide.

== Plot ==
Chicago therapist Violet Gates has begun to start dating again following the death of her abusive husband Blake. After finishing work, she is startled by a meter reading man knocking on her window to which she tells him round the back is open. Later on, leaving her young son Toby at home in the care of her younger sister Jen, Violet arrives at Palate, a top-of-the-tower restaurant, for a date with photographer Henry Campbell, whom she has been talking to via a dating app.

As Violet waits for Henry to arrive, she meets bartender Cara, pianist Phil, fellow diner Richard, who is on a blind date, and fellow diner Connor. Violet soon begins to receive "Digi-Drops" – a short range texting system – from an unknown user, sending memes to Violet that gradually become more threatening. Henry arrives, and the two are seated and served by new waiter Matt. Violet receives more drops, and Henry attempts to help her find out who it is, knowing it has to be someone seated in their section of the restaurant. Despite Violet's attempts to ignore the drops, they continue to escalate, eventually culminating in the user asking Violet to check her home security cameras.

On the cameras, Violet witnesses a masked gunman inside her home. Violet is messaged by her tormentor, demanding she not alert anyone or try to leave, otherwise Toby will be killed. Violet realizes the restaurant is bugged and she is being watched via security cameras. The user instructs Violet to retrieve a camera from Henry's bag and destroy its SD card. Violet obeys and discovers that Henry, who works for the city mayor, has photographed evidence of embezzlement. Henry grows suspicious of Violet's behavior and prepares to leave, but Violet kisses Henry and encourages him to stay, opening up about her trauma from Blake's death. The user then instructs Violet to retrieve a vial of poison from the bathroom and kill Henry.

Suspicious of Connor, Violet confronts him but is unable to prove he did anything. Unwilling to kill Henry, Violet slips a note to Phil informing him of the hostage situation, but Phil collapses shortly afterward and dies from poison while trying to exit the building. The user insults Violet over her failed plan and demands she kill Henry immediately. Violet orders shots and spikes Henry's, but panics as he prepares to drink his and makes a mess trying to stop him. When Henry leaves to clean up, Cara checks on Violet and mentions that Richard has had a similar bad date and has been watching Violet's table all night. Violet visits Richard with new shots and he reveals himself as her tormentor.

Richard is on the mayor's payroll and plans to assassinate Henry, who intends to testify against the mayor, while pinning the murder on Violet. Henry arrives and drinks the fresh shot in front of them, but as Richard gloats to Violet, she reveals that she actually poisoned the dessert Richard is eating. Realizing that he will die soon and his assassination plan has been ruined, Richard becomes enraged and attempts to shoot Violet, but Henry pushes her out of the way and is shot instead. A scuffle ensues, during which one of Richard's wild shots pierces a window and Cara is stabbed by Richard, who, now exposed, sends an alert to his henchman to kill Toby and Jen out of spite against Violet. Violet throws a hockey puck at the window, shattering it and blowing Richard outside, where he falls to his death; Violet nearly falls as well, but Henry saves her. Taking Henry's car, Violet races home while Jen is shot trying to protect Toby. Violet arrives and stabs the henchman who turns out to be the meter reader man, but he overpowers her; Toby then retrieves his dropped gun, and Violet shoots the henchman dead.

Sometime later, Violet visits Henry and Jen in the hospital, while it is revealed that Henry's photos of the mayor have resulted in his arrest and prosecution. Jen sends a drop to prank Violet and Henry before the new couple plans a second date.

== Cast ==
- Meghann Fahy as Violet, a widowed single mother
- Brandon Sklenar as Henry, Violet's dinner date
- Reed Diamond as Richard, a diner
- Violett Beane as Jen, Violet's younger sister
- Jeffery Self as Matt, the server
- Jacob Robinson as Toby, Violet's son
- Gabrielle Ryan as Cara, the bartender
- Ed Weeks as Phil, the in-house pianist
- Travis Nelson as Connor, a diner

== Production ==
In February 2024, it was announced Drop was in development with Christopher Landon directing after exiting Scream 7, with Jillian Jacobs and Chris Roach writing, and Meghann Fahy as the lead.

The film was loosely inspired by an experience Smosh cast member Olivia Sui had in 2022, when she anonymously received a series of Shrek memes AirDropped to her phone while on a date with her boyfriend Sam Lerner. The two found it "creepy and bizarre" and thought it would make for a good movie premise, working with their friend and the film's producer Cameron Fuller to develop the idea.

In March, Brandon Sklenar joined the cast of the film. In April, Jeffery Self, Gabrielle Ryan Spring, Violett Beane and Jacob Robinson were added to the cast. In May, Ed Weeks rounded out the cast.

Principal photography began in Ireland in late April 2024.

== Release ==
Drop premiered at the South by Southwest Festival on March 9, 2025, and was released theatrically in the United States on April 11, 2025.

=== Home media ===
The film was released on VOD on April 29, 2025, and was released on 4K and Blu-ray on June 10, 2025. It was released on Peacock on July 11, 2025.

== Reception ==
=== Box office ===
Drop has grossed $16.6 million in the United States and Canada, and $12.1 million in other territories, for a worldwide total of $28.5 million.

In the United States and Canada, Drop was released alongside The Amateur, Warfare, and The King of Kings, and was projected to gross $6–8 million from 3,085 theaters in its opening weekend. The film made $3.3 million on its first day, including an estimated $1.14 million from preview screenings throughout the week. It went on to debut to $7.4 million, finishing in fifth.

=== Critical response ===
On the review aggregator website Rotten Tomatoes, 83% of 232 critics' reviews are positive, with an average rating of 6.6/10. The website's consensus reads: "A Hitchcockian thriller that cleverly uses modern technology for its twists and turns, Drop delivers on its pulpy premise while providing a welcome showcase for Meghann Fahy's leading lady chops." Metacritic, which uses a weighted average, assigned the film a score of 65 out of 100, based on 37 critics, indicating "generally favorable" reviews. Audiences polled by CinemaScore gave the film an average grade of "B" on an A+ to F scale.

Iana Murrey of Empire gave the film a score of 4 stars out of 5, and wrote: "Fahy may be familiar to most from her ability to destroy you with a single look in the Sicily-set season of The White Lotus, and while Drop isn't nearly as subtle, her groundedness is the antidote to the film's silliness." Inverse's Hoai-Tran Bui wrote, "Drop comes from that same group of hypotheticals as [Landon's] greatest hits: What if someone blackmailed you into killing your first date? And the answer is a fun, efficient little thriller." The Guardian's Adrian Horton gave it 4 out of 5 stars, writing, "[Fahy's] dialed-in performance is thankfully matched by an overarching crispness to the proceedings – just enough flourishes, an enjoyable but not unbearable amount of stress, no wasted time, a perfect match of star, script and style."

In a negative review, Odie Henderson of The Boston Globe was less enthusiastic, stating: "The absurd plot twists in Drop might be tolerable if the film weren't so distastefully tethered to domestic violence." James Marsh of the South China Morning Post wrote, "While Drop certainly finds fun in its increasingly ridiculous premise, that playful sense of humour is mostly lacking. Landon plays things straight – or as straight as one can given the film's inherently implausible premise." The Daily Telegraph's Tim Robey gave it 2 stars out of 5, writing, "We've been through so many games like this – in the likes of Phone Booth, Red Eye and the recent Carry-On – which made virtues of their containment. But Drop botches its plot and looks so nastily composited there's no visual pleasure in the exercise."
