= The Divorce (novel) =

2026 novel by Freida McFadden

- Author: Freida McFadden
- Language: English
- Genre: Psychological thriller
- Publisher: Poisoned Pen
- Publication date: May 26, 2026
- Publication place: United States
- Pages: 368
- ISBN: 978-1-4642-4963-1

The Divorce is a 2026 psychological thriller novel by American author Freida McFadden. The story focuses on Naomi Roth, who investigates the woman her husband had been having an affair with after the latter files for divorce.

== Plot ==
Naomi Roth resides in Long Island with her husband Jeremy and their son Teddy. One day when she returns home, Jeremy evicts her from their home, and tells her the next day that he wants a divorce. Naomi subsequently discovers that Jeremy had been having an affair with Veronica Chesson, who is younger than him. The discovery prompts Naomi to investigate Veronica and to ensure that she stays away from Jeremy and Teddy.

== Background and publication history ==
McFadden and Poisoned Pen Press unveiled The Divorce and its first chapter to USA Today in January 2026. The latter published the novel on May 26, 2026.

== Reception ==
Library Journal's Lauren Hackert gave The Divorce a starred review, writing that McFadden laid out "a chilling story about divorce and deception." In Booklist, Kristine Huntley indicated that fans of McFadden "will be bracing themselves for her trademark twists, which will leave them rapidly turning the pages to get to the thrilling conclusion" with the novel. Kirkus Reviews wrote that with The Divorce, "McFadden outdoes herself in a story about how highly emotional people engage in risky behavior to get what they want".

Cape Argus columnists Liesl Van Der Schyff and Thina Botha stated that the novel "is a cut above the average thriller currently crowding best-seller playlists." According to Publishers Weekly, McFadden "has weighed down the plot with too many far-fetched twists and undermotivated double-crosses", with the outcome being "a domestic battle royale that’s more exhausting than entertaining".

== Adaptation ==
In May 2026, StudioCanal acquired the film rights to The Divorce. It will co-produce the adaptation alongside Working Title Films.
