= Natalia Warner =

British actress

- Occupation: Actress
- Years active: 2013–present

Natalia Warner is a British actress.

== Career ==
Warner made her film debut in Richard Ayoade's dystopian thriller The Double, which received a positive review from Empire. She stars as the female lead in Shoreline Entertainment's romantic drama Learning to Breathe (Official Selection at the 2016 London Raindance Film Festival), and British comedy The Five Wives and Lives of Melvyn Pfferberg, an Official Selection at the 2016 LA Shorts Fest. Warner made her American film debut in Temple, a psychological thriller set in Japan, from David Lynch's production company Absurda.

Warner starred in an international commercial for Boursin from Young & Rubicam.

== Filmography ==
Year	Films	Role	Notes
2013	The Double	The Girl	
2015	Following Footsteps	Sarah	
2016	The Five Wives & Lives of Melvyn Pfferberg	Carrie	
2016	Learning to Breathe	Katrina	
2017	Temple	Kate	
2019	The Morning Show	Cecily	TV series (2 episodes)
