= Crashing =

Crashing may refer to:

- Gate crashing, the act of entering an event without an invitation
- Wedding crashing, the act of entering a wedding without an invitation

== Television ==
- Crashing (British TV series), a 2016 British comedy drama series
- Crashing (American TV series), 2017 American comedy series

== Music ==
- "Crashing", song by the Residents from Not Available
- "Crashing" (Illenium song), 2019 song by Illenium from Ascend
- "Crashing" (D4vd and Kali Uchis song), 2025 song by d4vd and Kali Uchis from Withered

== See also ==
- Crash (disambiguation)
