= Divorcee (disambiguation) =

A divorcee is a person who has been divorced, whose marriage has been legally dissolved before death, ended in divorce; a male divorcé or female divorcée.

Divorcee, divorcé, or variation, may also refer to:

- The Divorcee (1919 film), 1919 American silent film starring Ethel Barrymore
- The Divorcée (1926 film) (German: Die geschiedene Frau), a German 1926 film
- The Divorcee, a 1930 film directed by Robert Z. Leonard
- The Divorcée (German: Die geschiedene Frau), a German 1953 film
- Die geschiedene Frau (English: The Divorcee), an operetta in three acts by Leo Fall

== See also ==
- The Gay Divorcee (1934 film), a 1934 U.S. musical film directed by Mark Sandrich
- Wallis Simpson, the Duchess of Windsor (1896–1986; born Bessie Wallis Warfield), nicknamed "The American Divorcée"
- Divorce (disambiguation)
