= Crash =

Crash or CRASH may refer to:

== Common meanings ==
- Collision, an impact between two or more objects
- Crash (computing), a condition where a program stops functioning properly and is abruptly or forcibly terminated
- Cardiac arrest, a medical condition in which the heart stops beating
- Couch surfing, temporarily staying at another person's home
- Gate crashing, the act of entering an event without invitation
- Stock market crash, a sudden dramatic decline of stock prices
- Traffic collision, a vehicle hitting another object

== Arts and entertainment ==
=== Film ===
- The Crash (1932 film), a drama starring Ruth Chatterton
- Crash (1974 film), a Norwegian drama directed by Rolf Clemens
- Crash!, a 1977 suspense drama starring José Ferrer and Sue Lyon
- Crash (1978 film), a made-for-TV docudrama starring William Shatner and Adrienne Barbeau
- Crash: The Mystery of Flight 1501, a 1990 made-for-TV film starring Cheryl Ladd
- Crash (1996 film), an erotic thriller directed by David Cronenberg
- Crash (2004 film), directed by Paul Haggis and winner of the 2005 Academy Award for Best Picture
- The Crash (2017 film), a thriller directed by Aram Rappaport

=== Television ===
- Crash (American TV series), an American drama based on the 2004 film
- Crash (Danish TV series), a Danish science-fiction series
- Crash (South Korean TV series), a South Korean comedy crime investigative series
- Crash (2009 TV series), a British medical drama series
- Crashh, a 2021 Indian web series
- Çarpışma (transl. Crash), a 2018–19 Turkish TV series
- "Crash" (The Good Wife), a 2009 episode

=== Publications ===
- Crash (Ballard novel), the basis of the 1996 film
- Crash (magazine), dedicated to the ZX Spectrum home computer and published from 1984 to 1991
- Crash (Spinelli novel), by Jerry Spinelli, 1996
- Crash Magazine, a French independent magazine
- Crash! (manga), a 2007 manga series by Yuka Fujiwara

=== Music ===
==== Bands ====
- Crash (South Korean band), a thrash metal band, who formed in 1991 from Seoul
- Crash (UK band), an indie rock band, from New York in the 1980s

==== Albums ====
- Crash (Billy "Crash" Craddock album) (1976)
- Crash (Charli XCX album) (2022)
- Crash (Dave Matthews Band album) (1996)
- Crash (Decyfer Down album) (2009)
- Crash (The Human League album) (1986)
- Crash (Kehlani album) (2024)
- Crash! (album), by guitarist Kenny Burrell (1963)

==== Songs ====
- "Crash" (Cavo song) (2009)
- "Crash" (Feeder song) (1997)
- "Crash" (The Primitives song) (1988)
- "Crash" (Royseven song) (2007)
- "Crash" (Gwen Stefani song) (2006)
- "Crash" (Usher song) (2016)
- "Crash", by Baboon from Something Good Is Going to Happen to You, 2002
- "Crash!" by Mandy Lee on her album The Pursuit of Pleasure, 2026
- "Crash" by Delta Goodrem on her album Bridge Over Troubled Dreams, 2021
- "Crash", by Shayne Ward from Obsession, 2010
- "Crash", by Nicola Roberts from Cinderella's Eyes, 2011
- "Crash!", by Propellerheads from Extended Play, 1998
- "Crash", by Sum 41 from Screaming Bloody Murder, 2011
- "Crash (Have Some Fun)", by TKA featuring Michelle Visage, 1990

=== Fictional characters ===
- Crash Bandicoot (character), the primary protagonist in the video game series of the same name
- Crash, a prehistoric opossum character in the Ice Age franchise
- Crash, an anthropomorphic puppet and main character in the Disney XD sitcom Crash & Bernstein
- Crash, a supervillain in DC Comics

=== Video games ===
- Burnout Crash!, a spin-off of the Burnout series
- Crash Bandicoot, a series of adventure video games
  - Crash Bandicoot (video game), the first game of the series
- Hot Wheels: Crash!, a video game released in 1999 for Microsoft Windows

== Card games ==
- Crash (card game), a British card game
- CRASH convention, a convention in the game of contract bridge

== People ==
- Crash (graffiti artist), American artist John Matos (born 1961)
- Ray "Crash" Corrigan (1902–1976), American actor
- Billy "Crash" Craddock (born 1939), country music singer
- Darby Crash (1958–1980), punk rock musician
- Crash Davis (1919–2001), American baseball player who inspired the name of the movie character
- Crash Holly and Crash, ring names of American professional wrestler Mike Lockwood (1971–2003)

== Sports teams ==
- Indy Crash, a women's full contact football team in the Women's Football Alliance
- Iowa City Crash, a team in the Midwest Rugby League

== Other uses ==
- Crash (genus), a genus of fossil bandicoots published in 2014
- Crash cymbal, used in occasional drumming accents
- HMS Crash, British Royal Navy vessels
- Sugar crash, a supposed sense of fatigue after consuming a large number of carbohydrates
- Community Resources Against Street Hoodlums (CRASH), a unit of the Los Angeles Police Department
- Crash, alternative name for a herd of rhinoceroses
- Crash (fabric), a plain linen fabric used for towels
- Crash, slang for a drug comedown

== See also ==
- Crash course (disambiguation)
- The Crash (disambiguation)
- "Crashed", a song by Daughtry
- Crasher (Gobots), several fictional characters in the Gobots toyline and cartoon, and Transformers series
- Crashing (disambiguation)
