= Crash course =

A crash course is an educational or research course conducted over a very short period of time. These rapid learning programs may also be described by the ambiguous term crash program.

Crash Course may also refer to:

== Television and movies ==
- Crash Course (film), a 1988 made-for-television film directed by Oz Scott
- Crash Course (TV series), a 2022 Indian TV drama series
- Crash Course (game show), a 2009 game show
- Crash Course (web series), an educational program launched by John and Hank Green in 2012
- Richard Hammond's Crash Course, a 2012 BBC America television show
- "Crash Course" (The Chief), a 1990 television episode
- "Crash Course", the 72nd episode of Code Lyoko

== Other uses ==
- Crash Course, a campaign in the video game Left 4 Dead
- Crash Course, an alternative title for the video game Stunt Driver
- Doritos Crash Course, a 2010 Xbox Live Arcade video game
- Crash Course in Science, a post-punk band formed in 1979 in Philadelphia
- Crash Course, a British band formed in 1977 which included member Pete Wylie
- Crash Course, an educational YouTube channel, started in 2012, and produced by Complexly

== See also ==
- Crash program, a plan of action entailing rapid, intensive resource allocation to solve a pressing problem
