= HMS Crash =

At least two vessels of the Royal Navy have borne the name, HMS Crash.

- HMS Crash (1797) was a 12-gun Acute-class gun-brig launched in 1797 and broken up in 1802.
- HMS Scourge was renamed HMS Crash in 1803 and broken up that same year.
