= Dvorce, Brežice =

Dvorce
- Location in Slovenia
- Coordinates: 45°53′9.81″N 15°36′40.87″E
- Country: Slovenia
- Traditional region: Lower Carniola
- Statistical region: Lower Sava
- Municipality: Brežice

Area
  - Total: 0.61 km^{2} (0.24 sq mi)
- Elevation: 147.4 m (484 ft)

Population (2020)
  - Total: 116
  - Density: 190/km^{2} (490/sq mi)

Dvorce (pronounced [ˈdʋoːɾtsɛ]; in older sources also Dvorice, German: Dworichdorf) is a settlement southeast of Čatež ob Savi in the Municipality of Brežice in eastern Slovenia. The area is part of the traditional region of Lower Carniola. It is now included with the rest of the municipality in the Lower Sava Statistical Region.

An Ancient Roman era burial ground has been found in the settlement. Mound burials, Latobici-type graves, and shallow skeletal burials of infants dating to the 2nd and 3rd centuries AD have been uncovered.
