= Kyjov (Havlíčkův Brod District) =

- Municipality
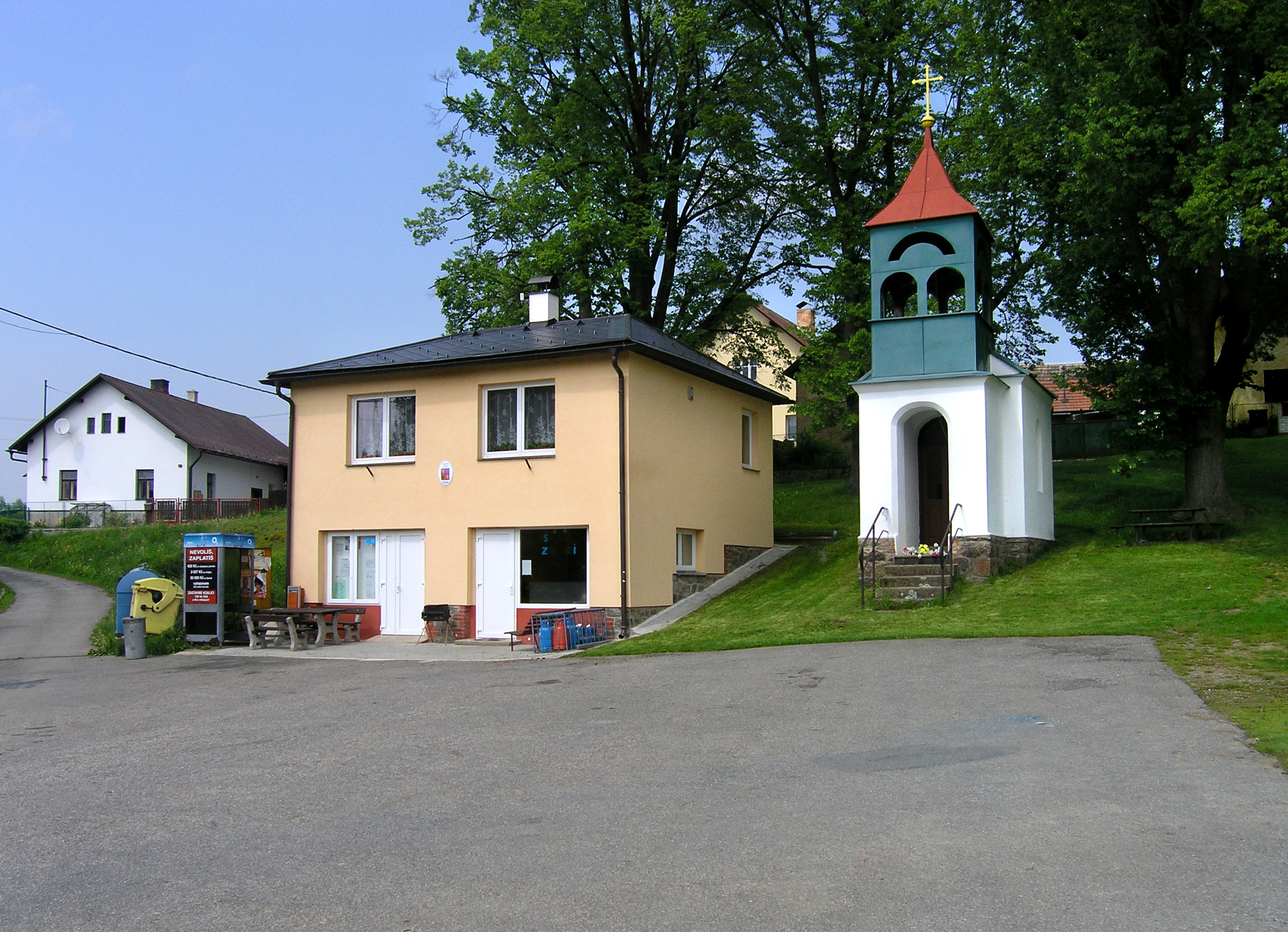
- Municipal office and belfry

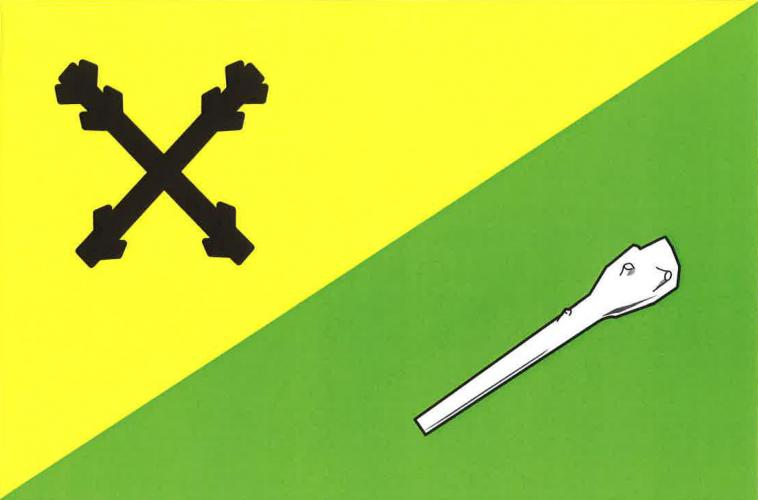
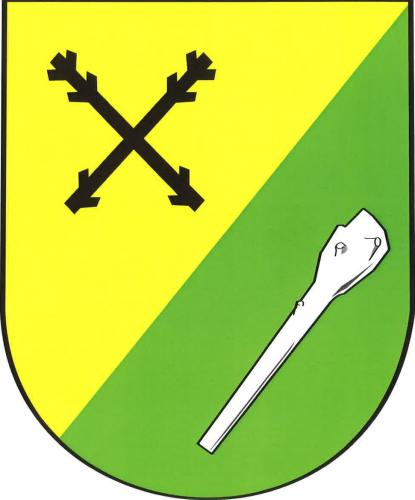
- Flag Coat of arms

- Location in the Czech Republic
- Coordinates: 49°37′46″N 15°37′24″E
- Country: Czech Republic
- Region: Vysočina
- District: Havlíčkův Brod
- First mentioned: 1351

Area
  - Total: 3.95 km^{2} (1.53 sq mi)
- Elevation: 468 m (1,535 ft)

Population (2026-01-01)
  - Total: 172
  - Density: 43.5/km^{2} (113/sq mi)
- Time zone: UTC+1 (CET)
  - Summer (DST): UTC+2 (CEST)
- Postal code: 580 01
- Website: obeckyjov.cz

Kyjov is a municipality and village in Havlíčkův Brod District in the Vysočina Region of the Czech Republic. It has about 200 inhabitants.

Kyjov lies approximately 5 kilometres (3 mi) north-east of Havlíčkův Brod, 27 km (17 mi) north of Jihlava, and 101 km (63 mi) south-east of Prague.

== Administrative division ==
Kyjov consists of two municipal parts (in brackets population according to the 2021 census):

- Kyjov (118)
- Dvorce (28)

== Demographics ==
Historical population
Year	Pop.	±%
1869	229	—
1880	203	−11.4%
1890	201	−1.0%
1900	170	−15.4%
1910	196	+15.3%
1921	194	−1.0%
1930	188	−3.1%
1950	167	−11.2%
1961	201	+20.4%
1970	179	−10.9%
1980	141	−21.2%
1991	121	−14.2%
2001	119	−1.7%
2011	138	+16.0%
2021	146	+5.8%
Source: Censuses
