= The Crash (novel) =

2025 novel by Freida McFadden

- Author: Freida McFadden
- Language: English
- Release number: 1
- Genre: Psychological thriller
- Set in: Rural Maine
- Publisher: Sourcebooks
- Publication date: January 28, 2025
- Media type: Hardcover, paperback, and e-book
- ISBN: 978-1464227325

The Crash is a psychological thriller novel by American author Freida McFadden. The book was published on January 28, 2025, by Sourcebooks.

== Plot summary ==
Tegan Werner lives alone in Lewiston, Maine and makes ends meet by working doubles in the local supermarket. She discovers she is pregnant five months after a one-night encounter. Simon, the father, refuses to take responsibility and asks her to sign a non-disclosure agreement in exchange for cash. Tegan initially agrees but later recalls, through a familiar scent of cologne, that Simon had drugged and raped her.

Now eight months pregnant and feeling distraught, Tegan leaves her apartment during a snowstorm, to visit her older brother, Dennis. But an accident keeps her from arriving at her destination. She becomes disoriented, crashes her car, and suffers a serious ankle injury. Hank Thompson, a stranger, appears, she feels she has no option but to accept his assistance or freeze, but his help raises her suspicion when he takes her to his cabin instead of a hospital, citing dangerous road conditions.

Upon meeting Hank’s wife, Polly, Tegan’s anxiety eases somewhat. Polly, a former nurse, accommodates Tegan in a makeshift basement hospital room that had been built for Polly’s late mother, promising to contact emergency services once the power and phone lines are restored. When the call never comes, Tegan begins to suspect she is in grave danger and that Hank is coercing Polly into keeping her there against her will.

The novel alternates between Tegan’s and Polly’s perspectives, providing a deeper understanding of the characters and heightening suspense.

== Themes ==
The novel explores themes of motherhood, survival, and the deceptive facades people present.
