= Brandon Sklenar =

American actor (born 1990)

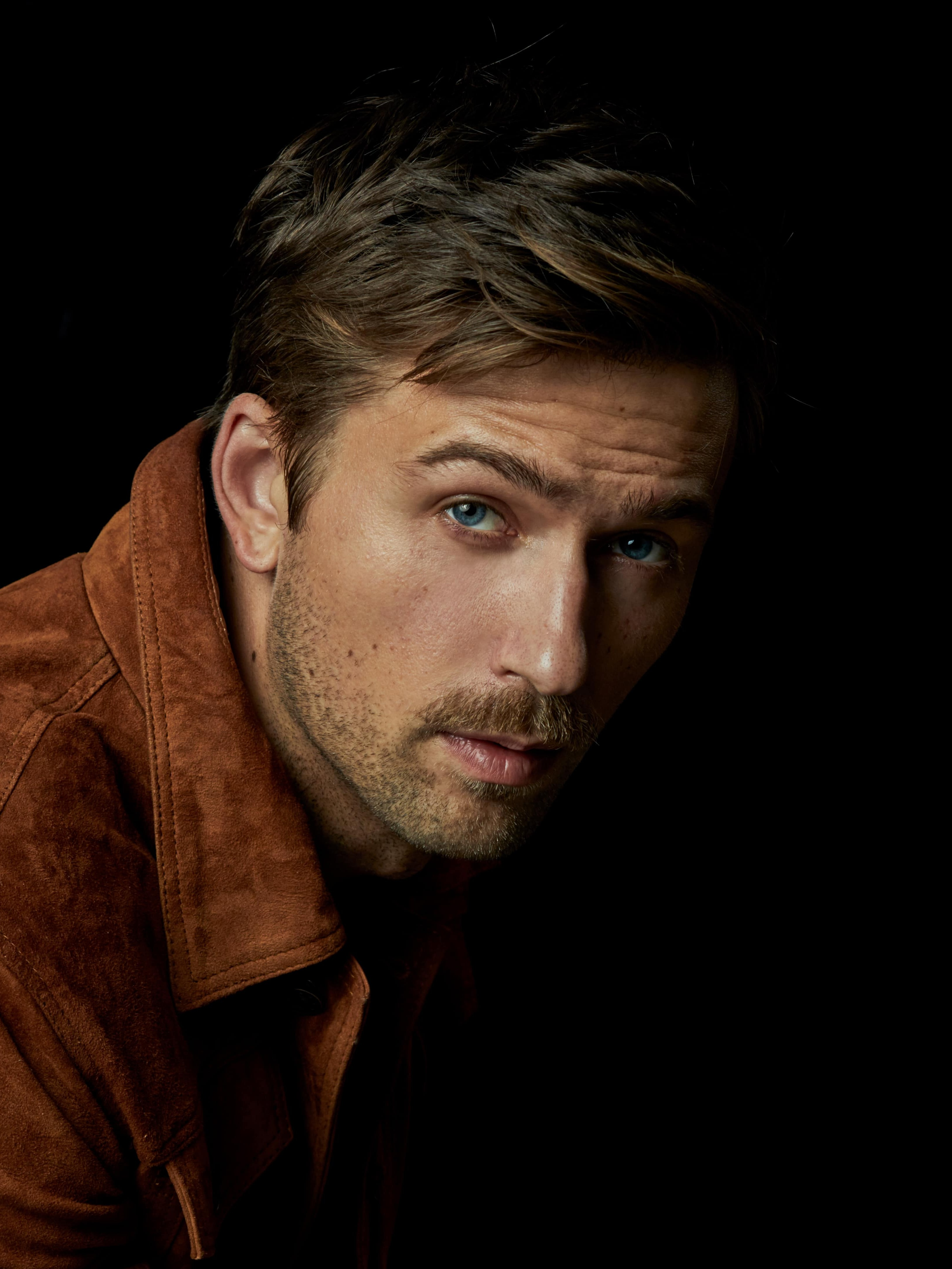
- Sklenar in 2019
- Born: Brandon Tyler Feakins; June 26, 1990 (age 36); Dover, New Jersey, United States
- Occupation: Actor
- Years active: 2011–present
- Notable work: 1923; It Ends with Us; Drop; The Housemaid

Brandon Tyler Feakins (born June 26, 1990), known professionally as Brandon Sklenar, is an American actor best known for his roles in the films Mapplethorpe, Vice (both 2018), Midway (2019), It Ends with Us (2024), Drop, and The Housemaid (both 2025). On television, he is known for his role as Spencer Dutton in 1923 (2022–25).

== Early life and education ==
Brandon Sklenar was born Brandon Feakins in Dover, New Jersey, and was raised in Northern New Jersey. His parents are Francine Sklenar, daughter of a former stage grip for the Metropolitan Opera House, and Bruce Feakins. Sklenar graduated in 2008 from Hackettstown High School and enrolled briefly at County College of Morris. After two months, he moved to California, adopting his mother's surname for acting purposes. He moved to Los Angeles and worked odd jobs; at age 20, he was signed by a manager.

== Career ==
Sklenar made his professional film debut in the 2011 film Cornered. The following year, he appeared in the television series Dating Rules from My Future Self. He then appeared in the film Chance, in 2014, the NBC comedy series Truth Be Told, in 2015, the films Hunky Dory and Bella Donna, and the television series Fall into Me, in 2016, a lead role in the American-Japanese horror film Temple and the Fox sitcom series, New Girl, in 2017.

He was then cast as Edward Mapplethorpe in the 2018 biographical drama film Mapplethorpe, which follows the life of New York photographer Robert Mapplethorpe. It screened at Tribeca Film Festival, in 2018, where it was named a runner-up in the U.S. Narrative Competition section. Sklenar received critical acclaim from multiple media outlets for his performance in Mapplethorpe, including from Boy Culture, who praised him for "[having] maximum impact in [his] psychologically charged scenes with [Matt] Smith" He appeared in the 2018 biographical drama film, Vice, opposite Amy Adams, Steve Carell, Christian Bale and Sam Rockwell. The film explores the life of politician Dick Cheney and is directed by Academy Award-winner Adam McKay. Sklenar then appeared in Amir Naderi's film Magic Lantern, in addition to films The Last Room and Glass Jaw. In June 2018, Sklenar was also cast in the independent drama film Indigo Valley, which is based on director Jaclyn Bethany's short film of the same name. That same year, Sklenar was cast as the lead antagonist in The Big Ugly, a noir crime thriller that weaves the British gangster genre with the American Western, opposite Ron Perlman, Malcolm McDowell, Nicholas Braun and Leven Rambin. For his work in the film as Junior Lawford, Sklenar received wide critical praise. Richard Roeper of the Chicago Sun Times stated, "Brandon Sklenar gives a screen-popping performance as Junior; he's fantastic as a monster cloaked in a James Dean persona."

Sklenar then went on to appear in Roland Emmerich's Midway for Lionsgate with Woody Harrelson, Luke Evans, and Patrick Wilson. Sklenar portrayed George H. Gay Jr., who was the sole survivor of Torpedo Squadron 8 (VT-8). He then starred in the independent film Jonesin' – a crime comedy about a moonshiner who, after a case of mistaken identity, gets abducted and finds himself stuck in the city between two rival gangs.

In early 2020, he was cast in the lead role of the independent film Futra Days opposite Tania Raymonde and Rosanna Arquette. The film is about a man traveling to the future and exploring the nature of control. For his role, he received the Best Actor award at Vienna Independent Film Festival, in 2022. In March 2021, he joined the cast of the film Karen opposite Taryn Manning and Cory Hardrict. In 2022, he was cast in the role of Spencer Dutton in the Yellowstone prequel television series 1923. In 2025, he played Andrew Winchester in The Housemaid, co-starring with Sydney Sweeney and Amanda Seyfried.

== Filmography ==
=== Film ===
Year	Title	Role	Notes
2017	Temple	James	
2018	Mapplethorpe	Edward Mapplethorpe	
2018	Vice	Bobby Prentace	
2019	Midway	George H. Gay Jr.	
2020	The Big Ugly	Junior Lawdord	
2021	Karen	Officer Hill	
2022	Emily the Criminal	Brent	
2024	It Ends with Us	Atlas Corrigan	
2025	Green and Gold	Billy	
2025	Drop	Henry Campbell	
2025	The Housemaid	Andrew Winchester	
2027	The Rescue †		Post-production
2027	F.A.S.T. †		Post-production
2027	Vegas: A Love Story †	Freddy	Post-production
TBA	Iron Jane †		Post-production; also producer

=== Television ===
Year	Title	Role	Notes
2012	Dating Rules from My Future Self	Bar Guy	Episode: "Chapter One: Who R U?"
2015	Truth Be Told	Neil	Episode: "Members Only"
2016	Fall into Me	Ryan Richards	Episode: "Love Street"
2017	New Girl	Loner	Episode: "Cece's Boys"
2022	Westworld	Henry	Episodes: "The Auguries" and "Que Será, Será"
2022	Walker: Independence	Liam Collins	Episode: "Pilot"
2022	The Offer	Burt Reynolds	Episode: "Brains and Balls"
2022–2025	1923	Spencer Dutton	Main role
