= Hot Wheels: Crash! =

1999 video game

- Publisher: Mattel Media
- Series: Hot Wheels
- Platform: Windows
- Release: September 1999
- Genre: Racing
- Mode: Single-player

Hot Wheels: Crash! is a 1999 video game published by Mattel Media.

== Gameplay ==
The gameplay consists of the player selecting a movie‑set‑style stage and driving a Hot Wheels vehicle into the environment to trigger as much destruction as possible. Each set contains objects that react when struck, and the player must determine where to aim the car to create chain reactions, sometimes using visual clues provided in the set. Some stages require the player to account for the angles and movement of falling or moving items to cause additional damage. Easier sets typically have a single intersection point that triggers most events when hit, while more difficult sets contain multiple points that must be struck either by the car or by redirected objects. The player learns how the vehicle bounces off large objects to better plan impacts. The game is structured around trial and error, encouraging the player to replay sets to achieve full destruction and higher scores.

== Development ==
Hot Wheels Crash was showcased at E3 1999.

== Reception ==
Reception

Review scores
Publication	Score
All Game Guide	4/5
PC Action	62%

Kids Domain found the replay Hot Wheels: Crash! small. All Game Guide called Hot Wheels: Crash! amazingly fun.

The Canadian Toy Testing Council gave Hot Wheels: Crash! three stars on a scale of three stars, two stars, one star, novelty, not recommended.
