= Sourcebooks =

US-American book publisher

- Parent company: Penguin Random House
- Status: Active
- Founded: 1987
- Country of origin: United States
- Headquarters location: Naperville, Illinois
- Distribution: Raincoast Books (Canada); Melia Publishing Services (UK); New South Books (Australia & New Zealand)
- Key people: Dominique Raccah
- Publication types: Books; Ebooks; Calendars
- Imprints: Sourcebooks, Landmark, Poisoned Pen Press, Fire, Jabberwocky, eXplore, Young Readers, Casablanca, Bloom Books
- Official website: www.sourcebooks.com

Sourcebooks LLC is an American book publisher located in Naperville, Illinois. The company publishes books, ebooks, and digital products.

== History ==
The company was founded in 1987 by Dominique Raccah as a business and finance publisher. Raccah cashed in $17,000 from her retirement fund to start the press. The company expanded into other categories of trade publishing. As of 2010, the company had 54 apps in development. By 2015, the publisher had 120 employees. In 2010, they were the largest woman-owned book publisher in the United States.

In 2013, the publisher launched a personalized stories creator application and website with its "Put Me In The Story" program. It has brands such as Sesame Street, the Berenstain Bears, and Hello Kitty, in addition to authors and illustrators such as Nancy Tillman. Later additions to "Put Me In The Story" included Curious George and characters from Disney and Nickelodeon, among others. In 2013, Sourcebooks acquired the book publisher Simple Truths. The company reported a 20% gain in sales in 2014, with particular gains from its Jabberwocky children's imprint and Fire young adult imprint. The results also included sales of more than two million picture books by Marianne Richmond.

In December 2016, Raccah was named book publishing's "Person of the Year" by Publishers Weekly, a book publishing trade magazine. In February 2017, Publishers Weekly reported NPD BookScan data showing Sourcebooks as the 18th-largest trade publisher in America. Sourcebooks published 385 titles in 2017 and was the 14th-largest trade publisher in the U.S.

In 2018, Sourcebooks acquired the mystery imprint Poisoned Pen Press. The following year, Penguin Random House acquired 45% of Sourcebooks, with the company forming a new management board that included Penguin Random House executives. In 2021, Peterson's Publishing sold B.E.S. Publishing to Sourcebooks. In 2023, Penguin Random House became the majority owner of Sourcebooks, owning 52% of the company; and Sourcebooks acquired Callisto Media, the parent of Rockridge Press. The same year, Penguin Random House and Sourcebooks launched Callisto China. As of January 2024, Sourcebooks says that it is the seventh largest book publisher in the United States. In 2024, Penguin Random House increased its stake in Sourcebooks to 75%.

== Imprints ==
- Sourcebooks (adult nonfiction)
- Sourcebooks Landmark (fiction)
- Sourcebooks Casablanca (romance)
- Cumberland House (gift, cookbooks, and history)
- Simple Truths (business, leadership, motivation, and inspiration)
- Sourcebooks Fire (young adult)
- Sourcebooks Kids
  - Sourcebooks Wonderland (specialized)
  - Sourcebooks Jabberwocky (children)
  - Sourcebooks Young Readers (middle grade)
  - Stonefruit Studio
  - Sourcebooks eXplore (nonfiction)
- Poisoned Pen Press (mystery)
- Bloom Books (romance)
