= Mystery Writers of America =

American organization of mystery and crime writers

Edgar Allan Poe, MWA logo

The Mystery Writers of America (MWA) is a professional organization of mystery and crime writers, based in New York City.

The organization was founded in 1945 by Clayton Rawson, Anthony Boucher, Lawrence Treat, and Brett Halliday.

It presents the Edgar Award, a small bust of Edgar Allan Poe, to mystery or crime writers every year. It presents the Raven Award to non-writers who contribute to the mystery genre. The category of Best Juvenile Mystery is also part of the Edgar Award, with such notable recipients as Barbara Brooks Wallace having won the honor twice for The Twin in the Tavern in 1994 and Sparrows in the Scullery in 1998, and Tony Abbott for his novel The Postcard in 2009.

John Dickson Carr, who also served as president of the MWA, won a Grand Master Award in 1949 and 1962.

== Grand Master Award ==
The Grand Master Award is the highest honor bestowed by the Mystery Writers of America. It recognizes lifetime achievement and consistent quality. (The award was presented irregularly up to 1978; from 1979 to 2008, it was given to one writer each year. Since 2009, as many as three authors have been honored annually.)

In 2018, the Mystery Writers of America announced that it would honor best-selling author and former prosecutor Linda Fairstein with one of its Grand Master Awards for literary achievement. But two days after controversy erupted in connection with her alleged role in the Central Park jogger case, the organization withdrew the honor.

Year	Recipient(s)
1955	Agatha Christie
1958	Vincent Starrett
1959	Rex Stout
1961	Ellery Queen
1962	Erle Stanley Gardner
1963	John Dickson Carr
1964	George Harmon Coxe
1966	Georges Simenon
1967	Baynard Kendrick
1969	John Creasey
1970	James M. Cain
1971	Mignon G. Eberhart
1972	John D. MacDonald
1973	Judson Philips; Alfred Hitchcock
1974	Ross Macdonald
1975	Eric Ambler
1976	Graham Greene
1978	Daphne du Maurier; Dorothy B. Hughes; Ngaio Marsh
1979	Aaron Marc Stein
1980	W. R. Burnett
1981	Stanley Ellin
1982	Julian Symons
1983	Margaret Millar
1984	John le Carré
1985	Dorothy Salisbury Davis
1986	Ed McBain
1987	Michael Gilbert
1988	Phyllis A. Whitney
1989	Hillary Waugh
1990	Helen McCloy
1991	Tony Hillerman
1992	Elmore Leonard
1993	Donald E. Westlake
1994	Lawrence Block
1995	Mickey Spillane
1996	Dick Francis
1997	Ruth Rendell
1998	Elizabeth Peters
1999	P. D. James
2000	Mary Higgins Clark
2001	Edward D. Hoch
2002	Robert B. Parker
2003	Ira Levin
2004	Joseph Wambaugh
2005	Marcia Muller
2006	Stuart M. Kaminsky
2007	Stephen King
2008	Bill Pronzini
2009	James Lee Burke; Sue Grafton
2010	Dorothy Gilman
2011	Sara Paretsky
2012	Martha Grimes
2013	Ken Follett; Margaret Maron
2014	Carolyn Hart; Robert Crais
2015	Lois Duncan; James Ellroy
2016	Walter Mosley
2017	Max Allan Collins; Ellen Hart
2018	Jane Langton; William Link; Peter Lovesey
2019	Martin Cruz Smith
2020	Barbara Neely
2021	Charlaine Harris; Jeffrey Deaver
2022	Laurie R. King
2023	Michael Connelly; Joanne Fluke
2024	Katherine Hall Page; R. L. Stine
2025	Laura Lippman; John Sandford
2026	Donna Andrews; Lee Child

== Raven Award ==
The Raven Awards are recorded in the Edgars Database of the Mystery Writers of America.

== See also ==
- The Top 100 Mystery Novels of All Time, selected by active MWA members in 1995
- Crime Writers' Association
- Crime Writers of Canada
- Mystery Writers of Japan
- Swedish Crime Writers' Academy
