= Poisoned Pen Press =

American publisher

- Parent company: Sourcebooks (Penguin Random House)
- Founded: 1997
- Founder: Robert Rosenwald, Barbara G. Peters, Susan Malling
- Country of origin: United States
- Headquarters location: Scottsdale, Arizona
- Key people: Robert Rosenwald (Publisher and President); Barbara G. Peters (Senior Editor); Jessica Tribble (Associate Publisher)
- Publication types: Books
- Fiction genres: Mystery
- No. of employees: 8
- Official website: www.poisonedpenpress.com

Poisoned Pen Press is a publisher of mystery fiction based in Scottsdale, Arizona, US. Poisoned Pen Press typically publishes thirty-six new hardcover mysteries per year, thirty-six new large type editions of those hardcovers, and between thirty and forty new trade paperback editions of previously published hardcovers.

== History ==
Poisoned Pen Press was founded in 1997 by Barbara G. Peters, Robert Rosenwald, and their daughter, Susan Malling. Peters, who had founded Scottsdale Arizona's 'The Poisoned Pen, A Mystery Bookstore' a decade ago, sees consolidations in the publishing industry as a threat to cultural diversity and to the survival of the independent bookstore.

Poisoned Pen Press began by selling out-of-print books, but soon expanded to publish original titles. They earned two Edgar Award nominations (1998 and 2000) and many of their books receive positive reviews in trade publications and general press.

Poisoned Pen Press was acquired by Sourcebooks in 2018.

== The Poisoned Pencil ==
In 2012, The Poisoned Pencil, an imprint of Poisoned Pen Press, was founded to publish mysteries for young adults. Ellen Larson was named editor of The Poisoned Pencil. The first release from The Poisoned Pencil was Death Spiral, by Janie Chodosh, on April 1, 2014. When Poisoned Pen Press was acquired by Sourcebooks in 2018, The Poisoned Pencil was merged into Sourcebooks' young adult imprint, Sourcebooks Fire.

== Awards and recognition ==
In recognition of Barbara Peters' and Robert Rosenwald's contribution to the publishing industry, they received the Lifetime Achievement Award at the 2008 Bouchercon Crime and Mystery conference.

On April 29, 2010, at the Mystery Writers of America's 64th annual Edgar Awards dinner, Barbara Peters and Robert Rosenwald were given the Ellery Queen Award, which honors "writing teams and outstanding people in the mystery-publishing industry".

== Notable authors ==
Notable authors the company has published include:

- James Anderson
- Robert Barnard
- Claudia Bishop
- Kate Charles
- Ruth Dudley Edwards
- Martin Edwards
- Sulari Gentill
- Kerry Greenwood
- Steven F. Havill
- Libby Fischer Hellmann
- H.R.F. Keating
- Laurie R. King
- Ken Kuhlken
- Edward Marston
- Peter May
- Val McDermid
- Keith Miles
- Susan Moody
- Paul Moorcraft
- Michael Norman
- Barbara G. Peters
- Frederick Ramsay
- James Sallis
- Rick Shefchik
- David Waltner-Toews
- Betty Webb
- Joseph Jefferson Farjeon
- Freida McFadden
