= Ngaio =

Ngaio, a Māori word, may refer to:

- Ngaio (tree) (Myoporum laetum), also known as the mousehole tree
- Ngaio weevil (Anagotus stephenensis)
- Ngaio, New Zealand, a suburb of Wellington, New Zealand
  - Ngaio railway station
- Ngaio Bealum, American comedian, musician, writer, actor, activist, and publisher
- Ngaio Beausoleil, New Zealand animal welfare researcher
- Ngaio Marsh (1895–1982), author and theatre director
  - Ngaio Marsh Awards
  - Ngaio Marsh House
  - Ngaio Marsh Theatre
  - Ngaio Marsh Theatre (TV series)
