= Henry Jellett =

Henry Jellett may refer to:

- Henry Jellett (priest) (1821–1901), Irish Anglican priest
- Henry Jellett (gynaecologist) (1872–1948), his son, Irish gynaecologist and author
