= Final Curtain (novel) =

1947 detective novel by Ngaio Marsh

- First UK edition
- Author: Ngaio Marsh
- Language: English
- Series: Roderick Alleyn
- Genre: Detective fiction
- Publisher: Collins (UK); Little, Brown (US)
- Publication date: 1947
- Media type: Print
- Preceded by: Died in the Wool
- Followed by: Swing Brother Swing

Final Curtain is a 1947 crime novel by the New Zealand author Ngaio Marsh, the fourteenth in her series of mysteries featuring Scotland Yard detective Roderick Alleyn. It was published in Britain by Collins and in the USA by Little, Brown. The plot features the world of actors, and Alleyn's wife, the artist Agatha Troy, has a main role in the story.

The novel was well received in contemporary reviews as well-written, coming smoothly to “a satisfactory climax”.

== Plot summary ==
In 1946 England, with World War II finally ended, the painter Agatha Troy awaits, after a lengthy wartime separation, the return of her husband Roderick Alleyn, who has been chasing spies in New Zealand as his contribution, while Troy has been making maps and pictorial surveys for the army in London. She accepts a commission to paint the celebrated actor Sir Henry Ancred at his ancestral home Ancreton Manor, where she meets his adult children and grandchildren, and witnesses the tensions and dynamics of a family of theatricals, who act as if on stage among themselves.

The main cause of trouble in the household is Sonia Orrincourt, a brassy young actress Sir Henry has made his mistress and then fiancée. A series of practical jokes are judged by Sir Henry to be the work of his youngest granddaughter, Patricia, known as Panty, an outspoken, mischievous child currently attending a school evacuated to Ancreton during the war, where an outbreak of ringworm has happened. These jokes anger Sir Henry against his family.

Troy finishes the portrait and displays it at Sir Henry’s 75th birthday party. That night, Sir Henry dies, apparently of natural causes. His last will creates a furore of accusation among the Ancred family, who later send anonymous notes that he was murdered. Troy returns home to reunite with her husband. They resume being in love, and begin a new phase about her involvement and interest in his work.

Alleyn investigates Sir Henry's death. Troy shares what she observed of the family with Alleyn. Arsenic is assumed as the poison because an old tin of rat poison is found. Sir Henry’s nightly glass of milk with a helpful medicine has been thoroughly washed, making investigation more difficult. They disinter the corpse, and learn that the poison that killed him is thallium, the treatment meant in small dose for the children.

The last will signed by Sir Henry gives the estate to his heir, grandson Cedric, but nearly all the cash goes to fiancée Sonia. That leaves Cedric with an expensive estate and no funds to run it. Selected other family members get a few thousand pounds. Granddaughter Panty was no longer a favorite in his last will. Cedric’s mother, Millamant, saw that will as unjust and infuriating for her son.

After much talk with upset family members and household staff, Alleyn realizes that there was an opportunity created when two medicine bottles picked up from the chemist were left untended in the flower room, not put in the children’s room and Sir Henry’s room directly. He realizes also that Sonia’s life is threatened at Ancreton Manor. With two plans for protecting her, he still arrives too late and she dies of the same poison. In his talks with family, he learns that Cedric and Sonia played all the practical jokes on Sir Henry.

Alleyn challenges Millamant; she put the thallium in the bottle meant for Sir Henry, tossed his original medicine, and put water in the bottle meant for the children who have ringworm. For Sonia, who adds milk to her tea, Millament repeats the fatal poisoning method.

Alleyn has no witness to any of Millamant’s actions, making for a weak case in court. He and Troy discuss this frustrating end to his involvement with Ancredon Manor.

== Characters ==
- Agatha Troy, famed portrait artist, wife of Roderick Alleyn
- Chief Inspector Roderick Alleyn
- Detective Inspector Fox
- Sir Henry Ancred, Baronet, well known actor, famous for playing Macbeth
- Cedric Ancred, son of the late Henry Irving Ancred and widow Millamant, heir to Sir Henry
- Thomas Ancred, Sir Henry’s younger son
- Pauline Kentish, his older daughter
- Paul Kentish, her son and Sir Henry’s grandson
- Patricia Kentish, aka Panty, her daughter and Sir Henry’s granddaughter
- Desdemona Ancred, his younger daughter
- Jenetta Ancred, wife of Sir Henry’s son Claude Ancred
- Fenella Ancred, their daughter and granddaughter to Sir Henry
- Miss Sonia Orrincourt, mistress and then fiancée of Sir Henry
- Miss Caroline Able, school mistress at Ancreton Manor

== Background ==
Ngaio Marsh, as her biographers Margaret Lewis and Joanne Drayton describe, spent World War Two in her native New Zealand, living with her father at their home outside Christchurch, continuing to write her increasingly popular crime novels, two of which (Colour Scheme and Died in the Wool) are set in New Zealand, and devoting much energy and creativity to directing and touring the Canterbury University Players in memorable productions, revitalising the New Zealand theatre in the process.

== Reception ==
Evelyn Banks reviewed the novel soon after publication, considering it keeps up Miss Marsh’s high standard, saying “The story moves smoothly, as do all Miss Marsh’s, to a satisfactory climax.”

The Observer considered it a “a detective story written with grace and culture, moving easily amongst well-observed characters.”

Marilyn Stasio, writing in The New York Times, titles a set of reviews as Final Curtain. She said that "Dame Ngaio still rules" in backstage mysteries, and went on to review a mystery novel by Peter Lovesey.

== Television adaptation ==
Final Curtain was adapted in 1993 for the BBC TV series The Inspector Alleyn Mysteries, starring Patrick Malahide as Roderick Alleyn, Belinda Lang as Agatha Troy and a cast including Eleanor Bron and Jonathan Cullen.
