= The Nursing Home Murder =

Book by Ngaio Marsh

- First edition
- Author: Ngaio Marsh & Henry Jellett
- Language: English
- Series: Roderick Alleyn
- Genre: Detective fiction
- Publisher: Geoffrey Bles
- Publication date: 1935
- Media type: Print
- Preceded by: Enter a Murderer
- Followed by: Death in Ecstasy

The Nursing Home Murder (1935) is a work of detective fiction by New Zealand author Ngaio Marsh and Henry Jellett. It is the only book Marsh co-authored.

== Background ==
Ngaio Marsh suffered from cancer which she obliquely refers to as a "recurring disability". She would eventually get a hysterectomy in 1975. During a particularly bad flare-up in 1934, Marsh was hospitalized for three months, undergoing a series of minor operations culminating in "a final snorter of a major one". Drs. Hugh Acland and Henry Jellett were her surgeons, and the procedure eliminated the possibility of Marsh bearing a child.

While Marsh recovered, she and Jellett collaborated on a murder mystery set in a nursing home. Jellett provided all of the precise medical details in the novel. Marsh and Jellett originally titled the book Death Follows a Surgeon. The pair would later collaborate on a musical called There She Goes.

== Synopsis ==
The British Home Secretary, Sir Derek O'Callaghan MP, has received several death threats from anarchists affiliated with Stalinist Communism – and a pleading letter threatening suicide from Jane Harden, a nurse with whom he had a short affair some months earlier. O'Callaghan's old friend and family physician, Sir John Phillips, visits to ask about O'Callaghan's relationship with Jane. She is Phillips's scrub nurse and Phillips has loved her from afar for years. O'Callaghan brutally informs Phillips that Jane is "easy" and not worth his regard; he and Phillips almost come to blows before Phillips threatens his life in front of a servant.

One week later, O'Callaghan is introducing a bill in the House of Commons to deal with anarchism when he doubles over, incapacitated by acute appendicitis. His wife, unaware of the fight or of Phillips's threats, has her husband moved to Phillips's private hospital ("nursing home" in contemporary usage) and begs Phillips to operate immediately. He does so against his own wishes, as assisted by Dr. Roberts, the anaesthetist; Dr. Thoms, the assistant surgeon; Sister Marigold, the matron; Nurse Banks, the circulating nurse; and Jane Harden, the scrub nurse. The operation goes well, but O'Callaghan weakens near the end of the operation and dies one hour later, apparently of peritonitis.

The next day, Lady O'Callaghan is going through her late husband's papers and finds both the death threats from anarchists and Jane Harden's letter. Convinced that her husband has been murdered, she calls in Roderick Alleyn of Scotland Yard. It turns out that O'Callaghan has died of an overdose of hyoscine, a drug used in anaesthesia. Suspicion falls not just on Phillips and Harden but also on Nurse Banks, an outspoken Communist whose constant vicious insults toward O'Callaghan during and after the operation have led to her dismissal.

Alleyn's digging reveals that it would have been possible for any member of the surgical team to have committed the crime. He learns that Harden loved O'Callaghan to the point that even after his death she was unable to return Phillips's feelings; that Banks is a member of an anarchist society almost completely controlled by the authorities (and which has more bark than bite, as Alleyn finds out when he attends a meeting in disguise with his amanuensis, Nigel Bathgate); that O'Callaghan's sister, an unbalanced, shrill, unintelligent hysteric, has been bullying her brother into taking quack medicine produced by an avowed Communist; and that Dr. Roberts the anaesthetist is a firm believer in eugenics to the point that he is unable to prevent himself from expounding on the topic for hours.

Frustrated, Alleyn finally arranges for a re-enactment of the operation; he is suspecting Roberts to be the killer but has no real evidence for this. During the re-enactment Sister Marigold brushes by Roberts's bulky anaesthetics cart during a weak moment and Dr. Thoms erupts in anger and nervousness, screaming that she could have blown up the entire room had the cart (which carries ether) fallen over. The incident makes Alleyn notice how keen Roberts is not to let anyone get too close to the cart. After the re-enactment has ended, the police see to it that Roberts (who tries to stay on the spot) is lured away from the room on a pretext, Alleyn quickly checks the cart and finds that one of the "bolts" holding the cart together is actually the top of a syringe. Hours later, he and Fox visit Roberts at his home and charge him with murder. Roberts admits to having injected O'Callaghan with hyoscine, but claims that he was justified: O'Callaghan's family had a "hereditary taint" (as shown by his sister), and it was his duty to remove such "tainted" persons from society. At the end, Alleyn points out that Roberts himself is insane and may have committed several similar murders, as suggested by the notches on his stethoscope.

In the epilogue Alleyn expresses doubt that Phillips and Harden will ever get together, and remarks that such things only happen in the "movie-mind".

== Characters ==
- Chief Inspector Roderick Alleyn
- Inspector Fox
- Nigel Bathgate – Alleyn's journalist friend
- Sir Derek O'Callaghan – The British Home Secretary
- Lady Cicely O'Callaghan – Sir Derek's wife
- Ruth O'Callaghan – Sir Derek's neurotic sister
- Sir John Phillips – a physician; friend of Sir Derek
- Jane Harden – a nurse Sir Derek once had an affair with
- Dr. Thoms – assistant surgeon
- Sister Marigold – the matron of the nursing home
- Nurse Banks – a nurse with anarchist leanings
- Dr. Roberts – an anaesthetist
- Angela North – Nigel's fiancée
- Harold Sage – a chemist and possible anarchist

== Adaptations ==
Marsh and Jellett decided their novel would work well on the stage. Jellett went to great lengths to insure the medical accuracy of the production, creating a fake abdomen for the surgery and even figuring out how to pipe the smell of ether into the theater. They called their play Exit Sir Derek, and the University of Canterbury Drama Society performed it in Christchurch in 1935. When they learned of Sidney Kingsley's Men in White, they felt it was too similar to their play and abandoned their ambitions for it.

In 1993, Kevin Laffan adapted the novel for The Inspector Alleyn Mysteries. It aired as episode 3 in series 1, and Patrick Malahide portrayed Roderick Alleyn.

In Agatha Christie's Murder in Mesopotamia, one of the characters, Nurse Leatheran, talks about having just read a murder mystery set in a nursing home. As an admirer of Marsh, it was probably a collegial nod from Christie.
