= Death and the Dancing Footman =

1942 book by Ngaio Marsh

- First edition (UK)
- Author: Ngaio Marsh
- Language: English
- Series: Roderick Alleyn
- Genre: Detective fiction
- Publisher: Little, Brown (US); Collins Crime Club (UK)
- Publication date: 1941 (US); 1942 (UK)
- Media type: Print
- Preceded by: Surfeit of Lampreys
- Followed by: Colour Scheme

Death and the Dancing Footman is a detective novel by Ngaio Marsh, the eleventh of her Roderick Alleyn books and was first published in 1941 in the US by Little Brown of Boston and in 1942 in the UK by Collins Crime Club. It was written in New Zealand, but set in a Dorset, England country house.

The novel received good reviews from The New York Times, and Britain's The Observer and The Tatler. It was hailed by the New Zealand Listener as "Miss Marsh's favourite among her own books".

== Plot summary ==
Set in Cloudyfold, Dorset in 1940; Jonathan, wealthy dabbler from the Royal of Highfold Manor, and Aubrey Mandrake, writer, map out guests that have mutually agreed to macabre entertainment for his house party. Among them are: an Austrian surgeon; the society woman on whom, twenty years earlier, he performed a facelift that has disfigured her for life; her two adult sons, bitter rivals in love and for their mother's affections; the fiancée of one brother who still nurtures feelings for the other brother who jilted her; and two equally bitter business rivals in the beauty industry.

Soon after the guests are gathered, Highfold Manor is cut off by a snowstorm with the phone line down, although the house still has electric power, possibly from a private generator. The victim is dispatched by a murderous blow from a Maori greenstone mere weapon.

Inspector Roderick Alleyn is called in, as he and his wife, the painter Agatha Troy, are staying nearby with the Copelands, who previously featured in March's 1939 novel, Overture to Death. Alleyn stages a re-enactment with the suspects, in which the key witness is the titular footman, who has lingered in the hall to listen to the radio while surreptitiously attempting the novelty dance band hit Hands, Knees and Boomps-a-Daisy.

== Reception ==
Milward Kennedy reviewed the novel for The Sunday Times: despite its limitations, he wrote, "we can enjoy and appreciate the intricate plot and the ingenuity of the murderer, and we have a fair chance to solve the puzzle". E.R. Punshon's review for The Manchester Guardian was likewise mixed, but concluded, "Miss Marsh shows again her literary skill and sense of character in her story of a cranky old man who amuses himself by observing among his friends social reactions which he did not expect to end in tragedy".

Kay Irvin, writing in The New York Times, was impressed with this novel by Marsh, noting the diverse personalities and the clever plot. She closed by saying "the interest of character is brilliant and unflagging, and both incident and conversation are alive with wit."

Aubrey Mandrake says that Royal has invited stark murder to his home.

== Development ==
The play Six Characters in Search of an Author by Luigi Pirandello deeply impressed Ngaio Marsh. She herself later directed it with great success.

== Allusions to real weapons ==
The weapon chosen is derived from Marsh's New Zealand nationality and background, and classically typical of the Golden Age Whodunnit's devotion to arcane weaponry.

== Similarity of plot to other authors ==
The novel's host and broad plot concept bear a kinship to Agatha Christie's 1936 novel Cards on the Table, although the treatment, characters and specific plot are entirely different and original.

== Adaptations ==
In December 1986 BBC Radio 4 broadcast a 90-minute adaptation, starring Nigel Graham (as Alleyn), Laurence Payne and Steven Pacey, and dramatised by Alan Downer.
