= Singing in the Shrouds =

Book by Ngaio Marsh

- First edition
- Author: Ngaio Marsh
- Language: English
- Series: Roderick Alleyn
- Genre: Detective fiction
- Publisher: Collins Crime Club
- Publication date: 1959
- Media type: Print
- Preceded by: Off With His Head
- Followed by: False Scent

Singing in the Shrouds is a detective novel by New Zealand writer Ngaio Marsh; it is the twentieth novel to feature Roderick Alleyn, and was first published in 1959. The plot concerns a serial killer who is on a voyage from London to South Africa.

== Background ==
New Zealand-born Ngaio Marsh travelled often between New Zealand and Europe or occasionally New Zealand and America or Japan.

Her novels draw upon her life experiences including her preference for travel by sea even after air travel was common. She always chose a small cargo ship with a limited number of passengers, rather than a big passenger liner.

Marsh biographer Joanne Drayton relates how the writer based the novel's Cape Farewell on a lengthy 1954 sea voyage she took aboard the Norwegian ship Temeraire, with a cargo of wool and 10 passengers, from Adelaide to Odessa, touching in Spain before its ultimate docking in Wales. As Drayton comments: 'The people on board and the ship itself became the material for Singing in the Shrouds '.

Marsh researched the psychopathic serial killer, a rare type in her novels. Two actual wartime cases clearly provide reference points for her plot - those of Gordon Cummins London's 'Blackout Ripper' and Eddie Leonski Melbourne's 'Brownout Killer'. The latter case shares common features with Marsh's fictional strangler, who 'says it with flowers' and sings as he kills or just after killing his victims: Leonski is recorded as having explained of the women he strangled that he wanted "to get at their voices".

== Plot synopsis ==
Shortly before the midnight sailing of the cargo ship Cape Farewell from the Pool of London, bound for Cape Town, with its crew and full complement of 9 assorted passengers, the body of a strangled woman is discovered on the fog-wreathed dock, clearly the third victim of a serial killer who scatters flowers and broken beads on his victims and sings as he departs. The body is clutching part of a torn embarkation notice for the Cape Farewell, so it seems 'The Flower Killer' must be one of the passengers. Scotland Yard Superintendent Roderick Alleyn boards by pilot off Portsmouth and poses as a passenger with the aim of identifying the culprit and preventing another murder on voyage, despite the grudging co-operation of the ship's Captain Bannerman, whose obstruction and denial of the situation enables a further killing to take place on voyage.

The passengers are a very mixed collection - according to the author, they are: a glamorous socialite widow, a sweet young girl who's been jilted at the altar, a deeply unhappy middle-aged spinster with a specialism in church music, an Anglo-Catholic priest, a pedantically tetchy school-teacher, an alcoholic TV presenter on the edge of a nervous breakdown, a charmlessly smug middle-aged couple and an eccentric elderly bachelor. The cast of suspects is completed by the crusty captain, the very camp steward and the ship's young doctor. As the ship cruises into the tropics, the temperature rises, tensions emerge and events lead relentlessly towards another murder, as the ship's passengers gradually recognise, with horror, that the Flower Killer is on board and due to strike again. Eventually, this happens, despite Roderick Alleyn's best efforts to prevent it, but the killer is identified to be Mr. Philip Merryman, the school teacher. He is apprehended as the ship reaches Cape Town.

== Adaptation ==
The novel was adapted for the stage in 1963 as Murder Sails at Midnight, and staged in 1972 in England.
