= False Scent =

Book by Ngaio Marsh

- First edition (US)
- Author: Ngaio Marsh
- Cover artist: Rita Derjue
- Language: English
- Series: Roderick Alleyn
- Genre: Detective fiction, Theatre-fiction
- Publisher: The Crime Club (UK); Little, Brown (US)
- Publication date: 1959
- Media type: Print
- Preceded by: Singing in the Shrouds
- Followed by: Hand in Glove

False Scent is a detective novel by New Zealand writer Ngaio Marsh; it is the twenty-first novel to feature Roderick Alleyn, and was first published in 1959, by Collins in the UK and Little, Brown in the USA. The plot concerns the murder of a West End stage actress during her 50th birthday party, and continues Marsh's fascination with the theatre and with acting.

== Plot ==
Indulged, egocentric Mary Bellamy, West End theatre star of light 'well-made' comedies rather than the grittier new style of Beckett, Osborne or Pinter, is celebrating her 50th birthday at her London home. She receives, in series, all her closest family and friends, each bearing presents, congratulations, gossip and news. These include: her wealthy businessman husband, an ageing former suitor, her adopted son (in whose first play, a light comedy, Mary starred), her former nanny and former dresser (two vinegary rivals) and three theatre colleagues - Mary's actress friend Pinky Cavendish, her favoured costume designer Bertie Saracen and the formidable theatre director.

Their various news unsettle Mary, who succumbs to her increasingly uncontrollable temperament in a distressing series of tantrums and threats towards each and every one of them. As Pinky tells her: 'You're a cannibal, Mary, and it's high time somebody had the guts to tell you so'. Matters come to a head at the birthday party itself, attended by the press and cream of London theatre, when Mary turns viciously upon her adopted son and the unknown young actress he loves and for whom he has written his new play. Mary storms up to her bedroom and is found, dying horribly after spraying herself from a perfume-bottle someone has filled with toxic 'Slaypest' for potted plants.

Roderick Alleyn investigates, interviewing the suspects, probing the tensions, hauling out skeletons from closets and identifying the murderer.

== Allusions to real people ==
The director in the novel Timon 'Timmy' Gantry, in name and manner suggest the real-life director Tyrone Guthrie, whom Marsh knew and greatly admired.

== Reception ==
False Scent was well received and sold well.

The New York Times commented, "The author sets the stage with effortless skill: it is worth noting that one does not grow impatient for Alleyn, though he is not summoned until page 106 of a 273-page novel... With that fateful entrance, a lighter-than-air novel of feuding Thespians changes instantly to an impeccably managed Q.E.D. in the geometry of death."

Biographer Joanne Drayton describes it as a "cleverly characterized but, after Alleyn's investigation begins, rather inert novel", and writes of Marsh dramatising the novel with a great family friend Eileen Mackay for a Worthing repertory company ("she wrestled with what she believed was one of her weaker novels"), quoting Marsh's own comment: "I think the fault may well be that like so many of my books it falls between teckery [ as she termed her detective fiction ] and a comedy of manners."

== Adaptation ==
The novel was adapted for the stage by Marsh and Eileen Mackay in 1960. It played at the Connaught Theatre in Worthing in 1961.
