= Swing Brother Swing =

1949 novel by Ngaio Marsh

- First edition
- Author: Ngaio Marsh
- Language: English
- Series: Roderick Alleyn
- Genre: Detective fiction
- Publisher: Collins Crime Club
- Publication date: 1949
- Media type: Print
- Preceded by: Final Curtain
- Followed by: Opening Night

Swing, Brother, Swing is a detective novel by Ngaio Marsh; it is the fifteenth novel to feature Roderick Alleyn, and was first published in 1949 in the UK. The novel was published as A Wreath for Rivera in the United States. The plot concerns the murder of a big band accordionist in London.

Most contemporary reviews were positive; “a honey”, “a succulent novel”, and “virtuosity in building up suspense”. Her two biographers, Margeret Lewis and Joanne Drayton, did not appreciate this novel as much, finding it not up to date in its setting, opposite to the reviews in 1949.

== Plot ==
The novel opens with a series of sharply contrasting letters, telegrams and gossip column press items. Then the cast of characters meet at the Belgravia home, Duke's Gate, London SW1, of the eccentric Lord Pastern & Bagott, his long-suffering French wife Lady Cécile and her daughter by a previous marriage Félicité (Fée) de Suze. Also present are Lady Pastern's companion-secretary Miss Henderson, family cousin Honorable Edward Manx, and Lord Pastern's niece Carlisle Wayne. Carlisle is returning from war work overseas, reunited with a family she observes with affectionate and cool detachment.

The plot is driven by the mysteriously owned popular magazine Harmony with an agony column signed by the anonymous GPF ('Guide, Philosopher, Friend') and the enthusiasm of Pastern to play percussion in Breezy Bellairs swing band, resident at the Metronome nightclub run by Caesar Bonn. Pastern composes a novelty number 'Hot Guy, Hot Gunner' with himself as drummer, to the disgust of the professional band players. His connection to the band leads to a burgeoning affair between the feckless young Fée and Carlos Rivera, the band's South American accordionist star and ladies' man.

The family party attend this debut at The Metronome. The novelty numbers, including 'The Peanut Vendor', 'The Umbrella Man' and 'Hot Guy, Hot Gunner' are to culminate with Rivera being 'shot dead' by a dummy firearm from Pastern, then carried off with a wreath and a funeral march played jazz-style. Instead, Rivera is dead. The weapon is a mini-harpoon fashioned from items at Duke’s Gate.

Inspector Fox arrives to investigate, finding Chief Superintendent Roderick Alleyn and his wife Agatha Troy are watching the performance. The investigation starts at the club. This reveals a sub-plot about drugs and blackmail involving Breezy Bellairs, Rivera and Caesar Bonn. Investigation moves to Duke's Gate, where the family is pressed hard, and then to the Harmony office, where Alleyn solves the mystery.

We learn that Troy is pregnant, when Alleyn calls his wife Mrs Quiverfull and tells Fox he is to be a godfather. This is the last novel to feature journalist Nigel Bathgate of the Evening Chronicle as a sort of Watson to Alleyn.

== Reception ==
Kirkus Reviews enjoyed this novel and its setting so clearly in the post-World War II world: “Slow starter but a honey when on its way” is the opening of the review. “The weapon, the incognito activities of the old peer, a drug racket, an unsuspected romance -- and plenty of red herrings -- all add up to problems and more problems for Social Register Inspector Alleyn and Inspector Fox.”

Anthony Boucher writing in The New York Times called this “a succulent novel.” The story presents Alleyn with “the murder of a hot piano accordionist in which several standard gambits and gimmicks are so neatly interwoven with red herrings (“red whales” Alleyn eventually calls them) that the most habituated reader is lulled into overlooking their obviousness.” Boucher’s only negative remark is that Marsh knows less about jazz musicians than about painters and actors.

Ralph Partridge writing in the New Statesman liked Marsh’s “light touch” in writing but said the story lacked substance. “Chief Inspector Alleyn, who actually witnesses the crime, takes half the book to solve it, and I can only urge readers, while he is doing so, to get on with their skimming.”

The Scotsman liked Swing Brother Swing, and remarked on her writing: “The plot is clever but Miss Marsh’s virtuosity in building up suspense is the thing.”

The Illustrated London News gave it a mixed review, stating that, after the murder, "the falling-off begins; there is too much unrelieved detection, and too much Alleyn. However, this decline is relative; we are still, and always, in exceptionally good hands."

Assessment by her biographers is less appreciative.

“Although [Marsh] attempts to give the novel a contemporary feel,' writes Dr Lewis, 'with references to food rationing, six-year-old dresses and the "exhausted aftermath" of the war, it is clearly based on her pre-war memories of London, where she danced at nightclubs like "The Metronome" with the Rhodes. Ngaio had not visited England for eleven years, and this is quite apparent in her approach. The plot is weak and trivial... and in comparison to the originality of her New Zealand-based novels, Swing, Brother, Swing appears a retrograde step.”

Marsh's later biographer Joanne Drayton is equally unenthusiastic about 'a formulaic book' in which Marsh 'fell back on what she knew to produce something that bordered on the hackneyed', referring to an aristocratic ambience, characters and themes that are 'anachronistic comic cliché straight out of Ngaio's property box of 1930s characters', seeing 'no place in post-war Britain for [ Lord ] Pastern's hedonism... Even Ngaio's humour falters in the face of his selfish stupidity... The wreath for Rivera is really Pastern's.' Drayton nevertheless praises Marsh's writing in the novel, which 'retained a vibrancy that still made it creditable. It was testimony to her professionalism that, in spite of her intense workload and personal loss, she produced a book that sold well.'

Drayton draws a parallel between Marsh's fictional Breezy Bellairs Boys and the real American band, Spike Jones & His City Slickers, whose novelty numbers and zany spoof versions of ballads were popular in the 1940s.
