= Ngaio Marsh Theatre (TV series) =

Ngaio Marsh Theatre is a 1977 television miniseries which adapted four of Ngaio Marsh's Inspector Roderick Alleyn detective novels for New Zealand television. The British actor George Baker starred in the title role.

The series adapted three Alleyn novels that were set in New Zealand (Vintage Murder, Colour Scheme, and Died in the Wool) along with the London-set Opening Night. The last mentioned featured a major character from New Zealand coming to England to work in the theatre. The series was originally screened on Television New Zealand. A later broadcast on PBS in the United States was the first American screening of a New Zealand television drama.

== Cast ==
- George Baker as Roderick Alleyn

Local actors who appeared in the series included Terence Cooper, Don Selwyn and Ian Watkin.
