= Death at the Bar =

1940 crime novel by Ngaio Marsh

- First edition
- Author: Ngaio Marsh
- Language: English
- Series: Roderick Alleyn
- Genre: Detective fiction
- Publisher: Collins
- Publication date: 1940
- Media type: Print
- Preceded by: Overture to Death
- Followed by: Surfeit of Lampreys

Death at the Bar is a crime novel by Ngaio Marsh, the ninth to feature her series detective Detective Chief Inspector Roderick Alleyn of Scotland Yard and published in 1940 by Collins (UK) and Little, Brown (USA).

The novel was adapted for television in 1993.

== Title ==
The novel's title is a pun on the legal term the bar, and the public house as the plot concerns the murder of a leading King's Counsel, or barrister-at-law, during a game of darts in the bar of a pub in a small South Devon village.

== Setting and date of publication ==
The novel is unusually dated on its final page 'May 3, 1939, New Zealand'. Despite its publication after the start of World War Two, the story is clearly set before the war, in Spring 1939.

== Plot summary ==
Luke Watchman, a top London barrister and King's Counsel, holidays in the fictional village of Ottercombe, South Devon, staying for a second year at the village pub, The Plume of Feathers, with his cousin Sebastian Parish, a West End actor, and their good friend Norman Cubitt, a painter. Ottercombe is a small, self-contained, picturesque fishing village, accessible only by a narrow road and foot tunnel. The Feathers is run by Abel Pomeroy and his son Will, who is an enthusiastic Communist, much involved in the recently formed Coombe Left Movement. The CLM has acquired recent arrival in town Bob Legge (who lives at the pub) as its treasurer and secretary. Also staying at the Feathers is Honorable Violet Darragh, a middle-aged, hard-up Anglo-Irish aristocrat and amateur watercolorist. The cast of suspects is completed by Decima Moore, a local farmer's daughter recently graduated from Oxford University, who has an understanding with Will Pomeroy, based on their shared left-wing views, and with whom Watchman is eager to rekindle a brief fling from the previous year.

The evening after Watchman's arrival, Bob Legge strikes the lawyer's finger with a dart while performing a trick and Watchman dies suddenly of cyanide poisoning, a particularly toxic rat poison used earlier in the pub's garage. How the cyanide entered Watchman's body is unknown. Although there are traces of the poison on the dart, it does not seem as if anyone could have tampered with it until after the fact. The police attention then turns to some brandy Watchman drank that was given to him by Decima to calm his nerves after the dart hit him.

Alleyn, with Inspector Fox, travels to Ottercombe at the request of Abel Pomeroy to investigate the murder. The Feathers's reputation is at stake because the inquest was inconclusive and some patrons believe Watchman was poisoned by Pomeroy's neglect. Alleyn rapidly detects the usual welter of motives, and the case seems to revolve around an old fraud trial, in which Watchman successfully defended Lord Bryonie by suggesting he was the gullible pawn of Montague Thringle, who was convicted and given a severe prison sentence. Before Alleyn can unmask Watchman's killer, in the face of considerable obstruction or outright hostility from the suspects, he only just contrives to save his assistant Inspector Fox from death by drinking cyanide-laced sherry from a bottle set aside for the two policemen.

With Fox recovering quickly, Alleyn unmasks the killer: Bob Legge. Legge is Montague Thringle who blames Watchman for his lengthy prison stay. Watchman initially fails to recognize Legge, whose appearance has changed drastically, but Legge recognizes him. While anyone could have poisoned the brandy or the dart after it was thrown, only Legge would have known that dart would pierce Watchman's finger when he deliberately missed the shot. Legge poisoned the iodine used to clean out Watchman's wound. He is arrested.

The local police work with Alleyn, and the Chief Constable asks to play Watson to Alleyn's Sherlock.

== Characters ==
- Chief Inspector Roderick Alleyn
- Inspector T R Fox
- Colonel Brammington — County Constable
- Nicholas Harper — Superintendent of Police in Illington
- Dr Shaw — Police surgeon, Illington
- Dr Mordant — Coroner in Illington
- Richard Oates — Police Constable for Illington and Ottercombe
- Luke Watchman - a successful barrister
- Sebastian Parish - Luke's actor cousin
- Norman Cubitt - Luke's painter friend
- Abel Pomeroy - proprietor of the Plume of Feathers in Devon
- Will Pomeroy - his son
- Mrs Ives - housekeeper at the Plume of Feathers
- Decima Moore - the local farmer's daughter; engaged to Will Pomeroy
- Violet Darragh - an impoverished Irish aristocrat
- Bob Legge - Treasurer and Secretary for the Coombe Left Movement
- George Nark - farmer in Ottercombe and local drunkard

== Reception ==
Contemporary reviews were uniformly positive for this novel.

Maurice Percy Ashley writing in The Times had strong praise for the plot and noted an improvement in style compared to her earlier novels, less sentimental. Miss Marsh “presents us with a really clever problem in detection, the very thing to absorb our attention on snowbound, blacked-out evenings.”

Ralph Partridge in The New Statesman called it a competent story, as “All the characters are lively, all the suspects plausibly suspicious and the clue is scrupulously fair.”

Katherine Woods in The New York Times called it “a treasure” because of the rich characters, humor and setting, on top of the key aspect, a mystery to solve.

Isaac Anderson in The New York Times Book Review liked the characterizations, and said “she knows how to employ humour without overplaying it.”

== Background ==
In her autobiography Black Beech And Honeydew, Ngaio Marsh describes Marton Cottage, the home in the hills outside Christchurch (NZ) she shared with her widowed father, as "a masculine household... with the emphasis on my father's generation", who would gather there of an evening to play darts. According to Marsh biographer Joanne Drayton, by April 1938, Marsh had returned to Christchurch after a long 1937-8 visit to England, where she had spent time with her old friends, the Rhodes family, visiting Devon and Cornwall, including Polperro (on which she drew for her fictional Ottercombe), adding to Death At The Bar her knowledge of the darts games her father Henry Marsh enjoyed, in which Ngaio sometimes took part.

== Adaptation ==
BBC One broadcast an adaptation of the novel on 9 May 1993 as part of the Inspector Alleyn Mysteries. The episode was directed by Michael Winterbottom and starred Patrick Malahide as Roderick Alleyn. The main deviation from Marsh in Alfred Shaughnessy's script was the suggestion of a homosexual relationship between two male characters.
