= Surfeit of Lampreys =

1941 detective novel by Ngaio Marsh

- First edition
- Author: Ngaio Marsh
- Language: English
- Series: Roderick Alleyn
- Genre: Detective fiction
- Publisher: Collins Crime Club
- Publication date: 1941
- Media type: Print
- Preceded by: Death at the Bar
- Followed by: Death and the Dancing Footman

Surfeit of Lampreys is a detective novel by Ngaio Marsh; it is the tenth novel to feature Roderick Alleyn, and was first published in 1941. The novel was published as Death of a Peer in the United States.

The plot concerns the murder of a British peer, a theme to which Marsh would return.

== Title ==
The title is a reference to the manner by which Henry I of England is said to have succumbed to food poisoning, as well as the surname of the first murder victim, and his family, who fall under suspicion.

== Plot ==
New Zealander Roberta Grey is anxious to see her old friends, the Lampreys, after several years of separation. The Lampreys are minor aristocratic family whom Roberta knew in her native New Zealand. The Lampreys were always short of money due to their spendthrift ways, but their woes were always resolved with the timely death of a distant relative.

Upon her arrival in London, Roberta learns from her the eldest Lamprey children, Henry and Frid, that the family is once again in dire financial straits, this time the worst it has ever been. Their father, Charles, desperately appeals to his older brother Gabriel Lamprey, Lord Wutherwood, for money. In order to soften Uncle G's normally stingy personality, the Lamprey children put on a charade acting out the biblical story of Jael and Sisera. Frid plays Jael and uses a skewer to mimic the tent peg Jael used to murder Sisera. The game does nothing to appeal to Uncle Gabriel and he angrily refuses to help his brother.

Lord Wutherwood storms out of the Lampreys' top-floor flat and into the lift. He screams for his wife, Violet, to join him and one of the Lamprey twins accompanies Aunt Violet to the lift. Moments later, Violet begins screaming. Gabriel has been skewered through the eyeball and dies a short while later. Chief Inspector Roderick Alleyn and Inspector Fox investigate. The Lampreys hope to pin the murder on Aunt Violet as she is eccentric, into witchcraft and acts erratically after finding her husband's body. They converse in French to hide their plot but the constable supervising them also speaks the language and is aware of their every word. The Lampreys argue about the twins, Colin and Stephen, because both twins admit to being the one to accompany Aunt Violet to the lift.

Roberta lies to Alleyn and tells him that Gabriel agreed to give his brother the money to pay his debts. Alleyn sees through her lies but is more interested in something else she said: that she heard the lift go down and come up before Violet screamed. The Lampreys are the obvious suspects as Gabriel's death ends their money woes and Charles now inherits the title of Lord Wutherwood. Gabriel's chauffeur, Giggle, and Violet's maid, Tinkerton, both have alibis as they were seen going down the stairs by the youngest Lamprey Michael and the doorman. Violet is also a prime suspect, but Alleyn thinks the Lampreys are pushing too hard in that direction.

Violet insists that Gabriel's body be moved to their London house for viewing. Alleyn grants this unusual request reluctantly. Since Aunt V is not in her right mind, Henry and Roberta accompany her to the London house. On the second night there, Roberta and Henry wake up to find Aunt V roaming around the house with Gabriel's severed hand her pocket as part of a black magic ritual for protection. Moreover, Giggle is found murdered in his bed, having had his throat slit by a left-handed person.

As Alleyn explains, Aunt Violet did not kill either Uncle Gabriel or Giggle, despite what things look like. Tinkerton manipulated Giggle into killing his employer to inherit a valuable parcel of land which Tinkerton hoped to secure for herself. She grabbed the skewer and handed it to Giggle. Tinkerton sent the lift, with Gabriel in it, down to the third floor where Giggle skewered him in the eye. She then sent the lift back up to the fourth floor which gave the appearance that Giggle and Tinkerton were on their way down the stairs before the murder occurred. Tinkerton was forced to kill Giggle because his conscience was getting the better of him. She also manipulated Violet into incriminating herself by convincing her to cut off Gabriel's hand and otherwise act unusual.

== Characters ==
- Chief Inspector Roderick Alleyn of Scotland Yard
- Inspector Fox
- Nigel Bathgate
- Detectives Bailey and Thompson
- Charles Lamprey – the younger brother of Lord Wutherwood
- Imogen Lamprey – his wife
- Henry Lamprey – the oldest Lamprey child
- Frid Lamprey – the second oldest Lamprey child
- Colin and Stephen Lamprey – the twins
- Patricia "Patch" Lamprey – the second youngest Lamprey child
- Michael Lamprey – the youngest Lamprey child, he subsequently appears as a civilian eager to join the police force in "I Can Find My Way Out" (in the short story collection Death on the Air and Other Stories), and in Opening Night as a police constable attached to the CID.
- Roberta Grey – friend of the Lampreys
- Gabriel, Marquis of Wutherwood and Rune – Charles' older brother
- Violet Lamprey – his wife
- Lady Katherine Lobe – Charles and Gabriel's aunt
- Giggle – Gabriel's chauffeur
- Tinkerton – Violet's maid
- Baskett – the Lampreys' butler
- Grimball – a debt collector

== Inspiration ==
As well as noting the real-life family who inspired the Lampreys, Earl F. Bargainnier calls the character of Roberta Grey "obviously Marsh's view of herself on her arrival in England in the late 1920s".

== Reception ==
Erik Routley called the novel Ngaio Marsh "at the top of her form... her longest and I think her richest story".

== Adaptation ==
The novel was adapted for a stage play by Owen Howell, with revision by Marsh. It was staged in London in 1950, but was not a success.

== Bibliography ==
- Bargainnier, Earl F. (1981). "Ngaio Marsh". In Bargainnier, Earl F. (ed.). 10 Women of Mystery. Bowling Green, OH: Bowling Green State University Popular Press. pp. 81–105. ISBN 0-87972-173-1.
- Lewis, Margaret (1998). Ngaio Marsh: A Life. Scottsdale: Poisoned Pen Press. ISBN 1-890208-05-1.
