= Off with His Head =

1956 detective novel by Ngaio Marsh

- First edition
- Author: Ngaio Marsh
- Language: English
- Series: Roderick Alleyn
- Genre: Detective fiction
- Publisher: Collins Crime Club
- Publication date: 1957
- Media type: Print
- Preceded by: Scales of Justice
- Followed by: Singing in the Shrouds

Off with His Head is a detective novel by Ngaio Marsh; it is the nineteenth novel to feature Roderick Alleyn. It was first published in the USA by Little, Brown of Boston in 1956, under the title Death of a Fool, and in the UK by Collins in 1957.

Set in the freezing, snowbound winter in a small English village Mardian, the plot concerns the annual performance in the courtyard of the local crumbling castle of an historic folkloric ritual, "The Dance of the Five Sons", containing elements of Morris dancing, sword dance and Mummers play. The fictional village is based on the village of Birling, Kent, where Marsh had stayed in 1954-1955 with her old friends, the Rhodes family.

== Plot ==
The story begins with South East England freezing under the coldest winter on record, as Mrs Anna Bünz, a German folklore enthusiast who emigrated at the start of the war, drives from her Worcestershire home to the tiny village of Mardian. She is in search of "The Dance of the Five Sons", a folkloric survival incorporating in uniquely rich profusion all the elements of English Morris, sword dance, guising and mumming. Given short shrift at Mardian Castle by the eccentric 94-year-old chatelaine, Dame Alice Mardian, and her inbred spinster niece Dulcie, Mrs Bünz stops at the village pub and sets out to study and witness the Winter Solstice ritual. The ritual dance is fiercely protected by William Andersen, an old owner and blacksmith at the local forge, who dominates tyrannically with his five sons and who traditionally enact the village's mumming ritual. The Christian names of the sons spell D-A-N-C-E: Dan, Andy, Nat, Chris and Ernie.

He repels Mrs Bünz furiously, seeing as an ill omen her attempted female intrusion on an ancient, instinctively understood male tradition. Andersen's granddaughter Camilla, a young actress, is also staying at the pub, hoping to reconnect with the family who rejected her mother Bessie for marrying outside her class and community. Ralph Stayne courts Camilla. He is the local vicar's son and Dame Alice's nephew and heir. Earlier in his life, he had enjoyed a no-bones-broken affair with the pub landlady, a point Camilla must address. Stayne has a key role in the mumming play. Hovering uncomfortably around this class hierarchy is an affably boozy ex-RAF hero, Simon Begg, who runs the local garage and also has a key role in the mumming play.

Tensions rise on Sword Wednesday around the small community, especially at The Forge, where William Andersen's 'simple' son Ernie wants to take over his father's starring role as Fool. Mrs Bünz watched the play. In this performance, the Fool, William Andersen, who is theatrically 'beheaded' by the Five Sons at the end of the Sword Dance, fails to 'rise from the dead' and is found decapitated for real in the snow.

Alleyn and Fox arrive from Scotland Yard to investigate. His investigation draws together the story's fundamental fascination with English folkloric traditions and the changing world that is impinging on Mardian's rigidly class-oriented life, as represented by William Andersen and Dame Alice. An event after Sword Wednesday demonstrates this. Dame Alice invites Alleyn, in a dinner jacket, to a dismally-cooked formal dinner with superb old wines from the cellar in the icy-cold, crumbling Mardian Castle. She gives Alleyn the old family document describing the past mumming ritual, with a clue to who has murdered William Andersen, and why.

Alleyn stages the dance again to reveal how William Andersen was killed and beheaded. Alleyn had noticed that little blood was found where the beheading took place, indicating that the man was already dead before his head was cut off.

Ernie is angry at his father and dresses himself as The Fool, so that his father has to take the costume off his son to don it himself on Sword Wednesday. In the re-enactment, a grandson wears the costume of The Fool, provoking Ernie’s anger a second time. Simon Begg is a hero to Ernie, and he steps in to calm Ernie, both times. William, a strong blacksmith, had gone at Simon, who reacted using a self-defense punch learned during the war. That punch killed William. Then Ernie cut off the head of his dead father. Mrs Bünz had aided Begg on Sword Wednesday to move the body. In the re-enactment it took several police officers to restrain Ernie in his anger.

Dame Alice asks Alleyn what sentences a judge and jury will hand down, which Alleyn does not know.

Ralph and Camilla work out their issues, and she accepts his proposal of marriage.

== Development ==
During one of her prolonged visits to England, Ngaio Marsh spent the exceptionally cold winter of 1954-5 snowed in at Birling Place in Kent, the home of her old New Zealand friends, the aristocratic Rhodes family, who were the source of so many experiences that informed Marsh's writing. This, according to Marsh's first biographer, was the inspiration for Mardian and Off With His Head, which she started writing in 1955, while living in a rented home in London's Hans Place.

Dr Lewis writes that the novel's background was very carefully researched, as was Ngaio Marsh's habit, and that "her library in Christchurch contains several reference books on folk dance and ancient customs." Ngaio Marsh was characteristically self-doubting and modest as she submitted the manuscript to her London agent Edmund Cork: "I'm in such a stew over it, not knowing if it's deadly dull or passable." And: Off With His Head "is an unusual novel and deserves better than categorisation as simply another piece of formula fiction... [T]he enduring nature of the ancient village and its pagan rites is ultimately more memorable than the routine task of identifying a murderer."

== Reception ==
Kirkus Reviews remarked the “ingenious” investigation by Alleyn in the setting of the old ritual dance, the young lovers, and concluded that “this strange mise-en-scene and the inventiveness of the story gives this a cachet among her many titles.”

Violet Grant in The Daily Telegraph wrote, "the detection is sensible and down-to-earth, and incidental information on folk-lore and dance is admirably interwoven".

The Illustrated London News said, "Ngaio Marsh has rarely done better: picturesque, very good story, excellent types and dialogue, and Inspector Alleyn under restraint".

Anthony Boucher, writing in The New York Times in a 1964 review of a book (Day of the Arrow) by Philip Loraine, compared it to Death of a Fool, saying it was “as oddly vivid in its invented folklore as Ngaio Marsh's “Death of a Fool.” “

Reviews of her previous novel made general remarks about the class-consciousness of English society that was the setting of the novels, and how to view that aspect of her writing.

Reviewing Marsh's 1955 Scales of Justice (which preceded Off With His Head), the New Statesman critic acknowledged her "magnificent workmanship" but found her books "often heavily loaded with crudely snobbish class consciousness".

Marsh biographer Margaret Lewis refers to a filed BBC memo rejecting a radio dramatisation of Scales of Justice as suffering from "appalling snobbishness". Dr Lewis goes on to comment that "a truer reading of the novel would be that the appalling snobbishness is accurately depicted and firmly ridiculed by the author".
