= University of Canterbury Drama Society =

Student performing-arts club in New Zealand

- Formation: 1921
- Type: Theatre group
- Purpose: Amateur theatrical club
- Location: University of Canterbury, Christchurch, New Zealand

The University of Canterbury Drama Society Inc (DramaSoc) is a student performing-arts club at the University of Canterbury, Christchurch, New Zealand. It began in 1921, and enjoyed a reputation as one of New Zealand's leading theatre groups from the 1920s to the 1960s, with notable alumni including Dame Ngaio Marsh and Sam Neill. With the exception of some brief pauses, the club has continued to be the primary non-musical theatre society of the university, and remains active today, with a membership numbering from dozens to hundreds and typically staging at least two or three productions each year.

== History ==
The Canterbury University College Drama Society began in 1921 under the leadership of Professor Sir James Shelley. It enjoyed a reputation as one of New Zealand's leading theatre groups from the 1920s to the 1960s. The Society was most notably active in the 1942–1969 era under Dame Ngaio Marsh, with critically acclaimed productions (especially of Shakespeare plays) and a 1949 theatre tour of Australia.

The Society was wound up in the early 1990s due to financial difficulties but was resurrected by an ad hoc committee in October and November 1993, and restarted as a full student club in the beginning of 1994. The Society is still active, typically producing between one and three major shows per year alongside many smaller performances and community events such as 3SOME, A Day 2 Play, and script readings. In 2017 DramaSoc started a casual improvisational theatre group called Say What?.

DramaSoc celebrated its 100th anniversary in 2021 with current membership and alumni attending various events such as a gallery of photographs, posters, programmes and props from past productions. In 2023, Say What? performed its first major longform show Suits and Scrubs in the Ngaio Marsh Theatre.

== Premises and Performance Spaces ==
The society's traditional home at the Ilam Campus was the Ngaio Marsh Theatre in the University of Canterbury Students' Association building. However, the society also regularly performed in other rooms of the Association building (most notably for its annual festival of student-authored one-act plays called 3SOME), in outdoor theatre settings on campus, the University Theatre in the Christchurch Arts Centre, and in roving street theatre events. However, with the Ngaio Marsh Theatre out of service following the 2011 Christchurch earthquake, performances primarily took place in the Jack Mann Auditorium on the College of Education campus. Since 2019, the society has been primarily performing in the new Ngaio Marsh Theatre in the university's Haere Roa Building.
