= Death in Ecstasy =

1936 detective novel by Ngaio Marsh

- First edition
- Author: Ngaio Marsh
- Language: English
- Series: Roderick Alleyn
- Genre: Detective fiction
- Publisher: Geoffrey Bles
- Publication date: 1936
- Media type: Print
- Preceded by: The Nursing Home Murder
- Followed by: Vintage Murder

Death in Ecstasy is a detective novel by Ngaio Marsh, the fourth to feature her series detective, Chief Inspector Roderick Alleyn of Scotland Yard. It was first published in 1936.

When lovely Cara Quayne drops to the floor dead after drinking the ritual wine at the House of the Sacred Flame, she was having a religious experience of a sort unsuspected by the other initiates. Discovering how the fatal prussic acid got into the wine is but one of the perplexing riddles that confronts Scotland Yard's Inspector Roderick Alleyn, when he is called upon to discover who poisoned this wealthy cult member.

== Plot summary ==
Journalist Nigel Bathgate lets curiosity get the better of him when he decides to attend services at The Temple of the Sacred Flame. He sneaks in and witnesses the ceremony. One of the initiates, Cara Quayne, has been selected to be the Chosen Vessel. As the ritual proceeds, Miss Quayne drinks from a goblet of wine, appears to enter an ecstatic state, and then falls down dead.

Chief Inspector Roderick Alleyn is called in to investigate. Nigel relays everything he has witnessed. All of the initiates drank from the goblet with Cara Quayne having done so last. Father Garnette blessed the goblet then passed it to the initiates who drank from it with their eyes closed. A partially dissolved scrap of paper is discovered in the goblet, leading Alleyn to believe one of the initiates dropped the cyanide into the goblet in that manner. Moreover, Alleyn finds an old book in Garnette's quarters that opens up to a page on how to make cyanide at home. The book belongs to Samuel Ogden who claims it went missing some days or weeks earlier.

Alleyn's questioning reveals very little. Several initiates have a god complex for Garnette and many are clearly jealous over the attention the wealthy Cara Quayne received from the priest. Miss Ernestine Wade claims she overheard Miss Quayne arguing with someone the afternoon of the murder where Quayne threatened to expose someone. Alleyn suspects this is about some missing bonds Miss Quayne donated to the church but were stolen from the priest's safe.

Alleyn's attention moves toward Maurice Pringle, an initiate who is addicted to drugs. Maurice is in love with fellow initiate Janey Jenkins who befriends Nigel and tells him about Maurice's addiction. She believes Father Garnette is the one responsible. Alleyn begins investigating the finances of the church and learns Ogden has a very large financial stake in the church because he provided most of the founding capital. Garnette receives a certain percentage of the income and M. Raoul de Ravigne receives a much smaller percentage. Cara Quayne's will leaves much of her vast fortune to the Church of the Sacred Flame.

Alleyn arrests Garnette for drug smuggling and Samuel Ogden for murder. Ogden is a well-known figure wanted for drug smuggling and murder in Australia. He has also partaken in a number of schemes such as the Church of the Sacred Flame. He murdered Cara Quayne because she knew he stole the bonds from the priest's safe and also because he would receive the bulk of her estate through his own stake in the church. Ogden was the last person to drink from the goblet during the ceremony, which gave him the most advantageous position to slip the poison into the wine.

== Characters ==
- Jasper Garnette- priest in the Temple of the Sacred Flame

Seven initiates:

- Samuel J Ogden- Church warden, businessman & investor in The Temple.
- Raoul de Ravigne- Church warden & wealthy dilettante.
- Cara Quayne- the "Chosen Vessel", a wealthy and beautiful orphan.
- Janie Jenkins- the youngest of the initiates.
- Maurice Pringle- Janie Jenkins' fiancé and a reluctant initiate.
- Ernestine Wade- the eldest of the initiates.
- Dagmar Candour - an initiate with a love for gossip and a hatred for Cara Quayne

Others:

- Claude Whitley & Lionel Smith- acolytes at The Temple.
- Dr Nicholas Kasbek- witness.
- The Gatekeeper Of The Temple.
- Edith Laura Hebborn- Cara Quayne's nurse.
- Wilson- Cara Quayne's parlourmaid.
- Mr Ratisbon- Cara Quayne's lawyer. previously seen in The Nursing Home Murder
- Elsie- Mr Ogden's housekeeper.
- Roderick Alleyn- Chief Inspector of Scotland Yard.
- Inspector Fox- his assistant.
- Sergeant Bailey- his fingerprint specialist.
- Dr Curtis-his district doctor.
- Nigel Bathgate- his Watson, a young journalist.

== Reception ==
Otago Daily Times was impressed by this novel, both the crafty murderer and the weird devotees. The summary statement focused on her wit: "Her pungent wit, quick to play upon the foibles of a rather distressing cross-section of London's social hotch-potch, has never been more blisteringly applied."

The New York Times wrote in 1941, "There is internal evidence that this is an earlier Ngaio Marsh book. It lacks something of the expert plotting and the matured style that characterize most of this author's other stories. But even so, it is much better than the average run of mystery tales. Miss Marsh may not have completely found herself, but she already possessed the story-telling talent to an unusual degree." Despite this praise, the review concluded, "Experienced detective story readers will not have a great deal of difficulty in spotting the murderer."

== Development ==
Death in Ecstasy centers on a dubious spiritual cult in fashionable 1930s London, with an even more suspect charismatic cult leader. According to Marsh's biographer Margaret Lewis, the book drew on an actual cult in 1890s Christchurch, New Zealand, that of Arthur Bentley Worthington's Temple of Truth though her fictional characters are not modeled on the members of that cult, nor did the New Zealand cult have murders in it in the 1890s.

== Style ==
The novel dispenses with Marsh's usual introductory section establishing her characters, their relationships to each other and motives, plunging straight into journalist Nigel Bathgate's spur-of-the-moment attendance at The Temple of the Sacred Flame, where a sudden death takes place.

== Author's preface ==
In her Preface, the author thanks Robin Page "for his advice on sodium cyanide", Guy Cotteril "for his plan of the Temple", and Robin and Adamson "for the friendly ingenuity in the preparation of household poisons".

== Radio and television adaptations ==
A television episode in 1964 had Geoffrey Keen in the lead role, Keith Barron as Nigel Bathgate, Joss Ackland as Jasper Garnett and Nigel Hawthorne as a temple doorkeeper.

A dramatisation by John Tidyman of the novel was broadcast on BBC Radio 4's Saturday Night Theatre in September 1969, with Peter Howell as Alleyn and Gary Watson as Nigel Bathgate.
