= Ngaio Marsh =

New Zealand crime writer and theatre director (1895–1982)

Dame Ngaio Marsh DBE
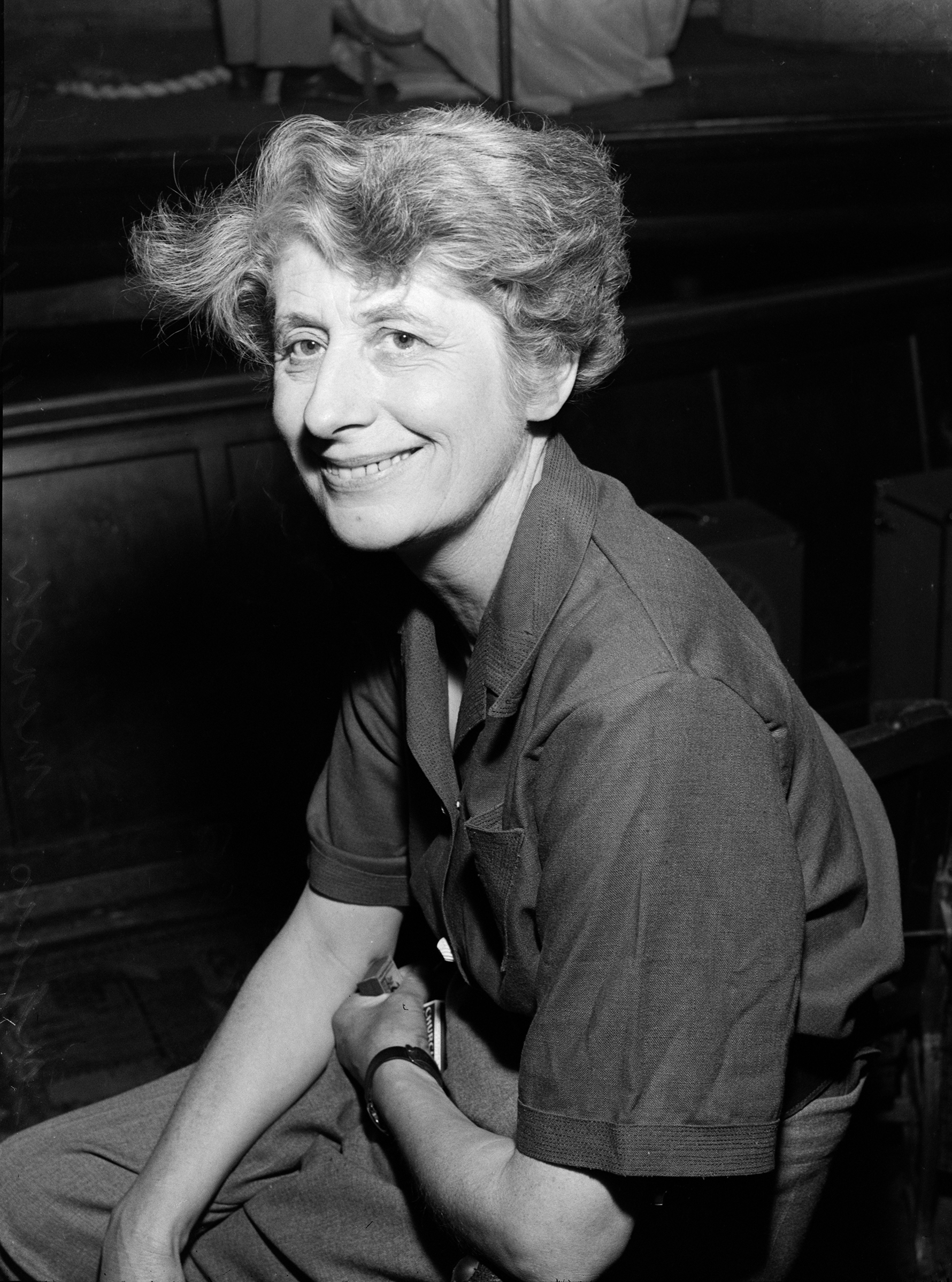
- Ngaio Marsh, Sydney, 14 January 1949
- Born: Edith Ngaio Marsh; 23 April 1895; Christchurch, New Zealand
- Died: 18 February 1982 (aged 86); Christchurch, New Zealand
- Education: St Margaret's College, Christchurch
- Alma mater: University of Canterbury
- Occupation: Writing
- Relatives: Robert Speight (uncle)
- Writing career
- Language: English
- Genre: Crime fiction
- Movement: Golden Age of Detective Fiction

Dame Edith Ngaio Marsh (/ˈnaɪoʊ/ NY-oh; 23 April 1895 – 18 February 1982) was a New Zealand writer.

As a crime writer during the "Golden Age of Detective Fiction", Marsh is known as one of the "Queens of Crime", along with Agatha Christie, Dorothy L. Sayers, and Margery Allingham. She is known primarily for her character Inspector Roderick Alleyn, a gentleman detective who works for the London Metropolitan Police, and who first appeared in her novel A Man Lay Dead (1934).

The Ngaio Marsh Awards are awarded annually for the best New Zealand mystery, crime and thriller fiction writing.

== Youth ==
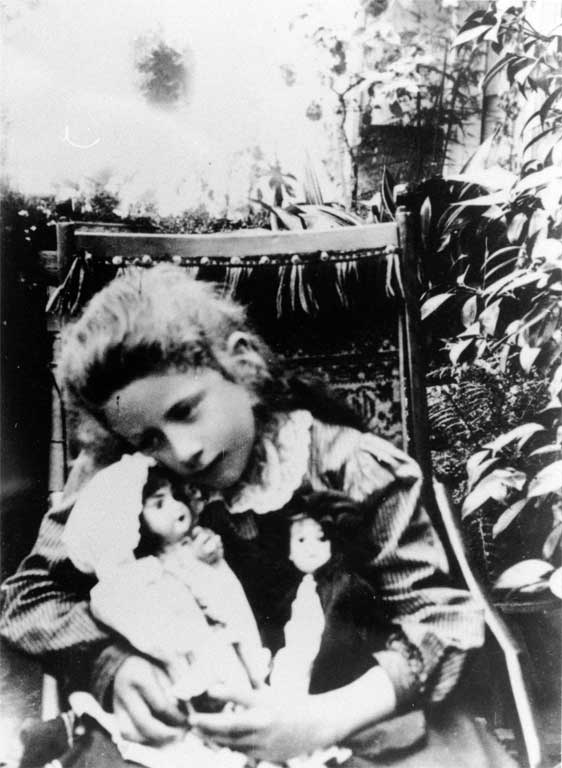
Ngaio Marsh with her two dolls c. 1905

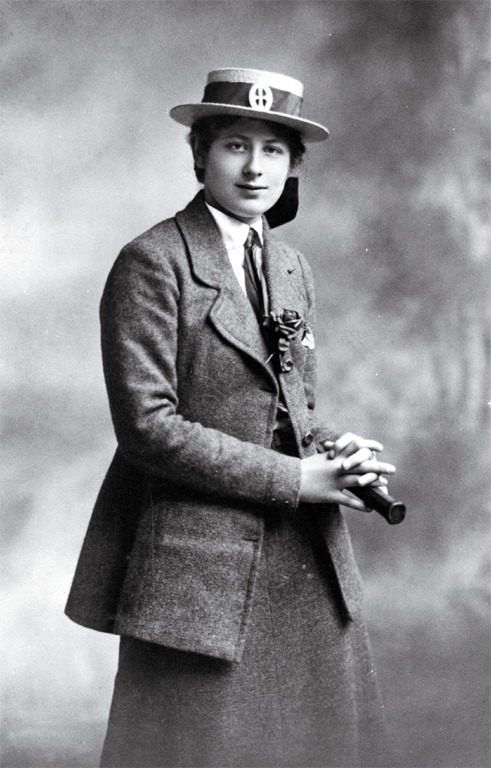
Ngaio Marsh (school prefect) in her St. Margaret's College school uniform, between 1910 and 1914

Marsh was born on 23 April 1895 in the city of Christchurch, New Zealand, where she also died. In the Introduction to The Collected Short Fiction of Ngaio Marsh, Douglas G. Greene writes: "Marsh explained to an interviewer... that in New Zealand European children often receive native names, and Ngaio... can mean either 'light on the water' or 'little tree bug' in the Māori language. Other sources say that it is the name of a native flowering tree." Her father neglected to register her birth until 1900 and there is some uncertainty about the date. She was the only child of Rose and bank clerk Henry Marsh, described by Marsh as "have-nots". Her mother's sister Ruth married the geologist, lecturer, and curator Robert Speight.

Ngaio Marsh was educated at St Margaret's College in Christchurch, where she was one of the first pupils when the school was founded. She studied painting at the Canterbury College (NZ) School of Art before joining the Allan Wilkie company as an actress in 1916 and touring New Zealand. For a short time in 1921 she was a member of the Rosemary Rees English Comedy Company, a touring company formed by actor-manager Rosemary Rees.

In 1928 Marsh went to London with friends (on whom she would base the Lamprey family in Surfeit of Lampreys). From then on she divided her time between living in New Zealand and the United Kingdom. In London she began writing syndicated articles, which were published in New Zealand. In addition she and one of the friends with whom she had come to London opened Touch and Go, a handicraft shop that sold items such as decorated trays, bowls and lampshades. From 1928 to 1932 she ran the shop in Knightsbridge, London. During that time she wrote her first book, A Man Lay Dead. She wrote about the process of writing her first book in an essay, "Roderick Alleyn".

Marsh was a member of The Group, an art association based in Christchurch, New Zealand. She exhibited with them in 1927, 1928, 1935, 1936, 1938, 1940 and 1947.

== Career ==
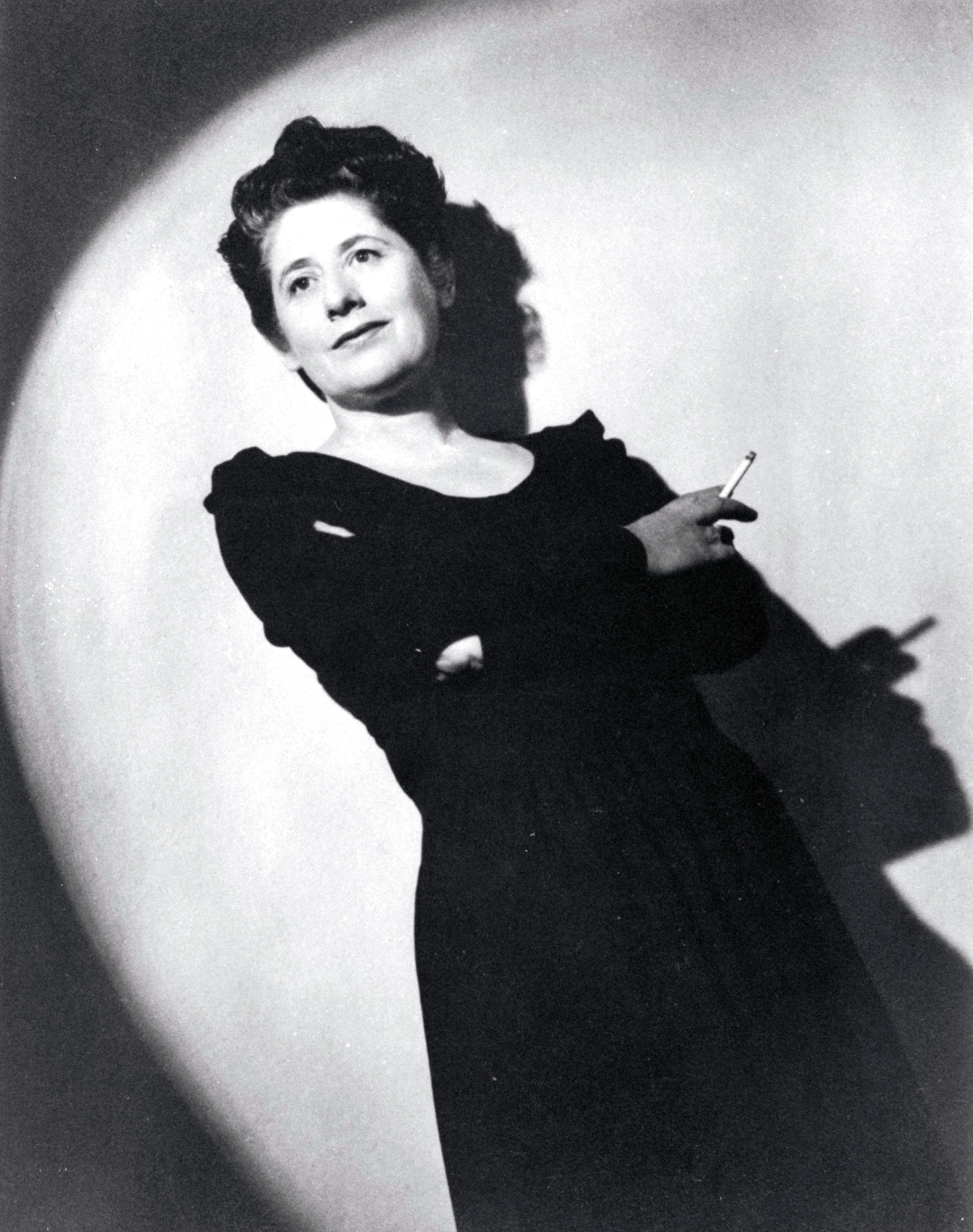
Ngaio Marsh, 1940s

Internationally she is best known for her 32 detective novels published between 1934 and 1982. Along with Dorothy L. Sayers, Margery Allingham and Agatha Christie, she has been classed as one of the four original "Queens of Crime" —female writers who dominated the genre of crime fiction in the Golden Age of the 1920s and 1930s. Agatha Christie held that both Muriel Spark and Ngaio Marsh wrote a very good detective story.

All her novels feature British CID detective Roderick Alleyn. Several novels feature Marsh's other loves, the theatre and painting. A number are set around theatrical productions (Enter a Murderer, Vintage Murder, Overture to Death, Opening Night, Death at the Dolphin, and Light Thickens), and three others are about actors off stage (Colour Scheme, False Scent and Final Curtain). Her short story "'I Can Find My Way Out" is also set around a theatrical production and is the earlier "Jupiter case" referred to in Opening Night; the short story won third prize in 1946 in the inaugural short story contest of Ellery Queen's Mystery Magazine. Alleyn marries a painter, Agatha Troy, whom he meets during an investigation (Artists in Crime), and who features in three later novels.

Most of the novels are set in England, but four are set in New Zealand, with Alleyn either on secondment to the New Zealand police (Colour Scheme and Died in the Wool) or on holiday (Vintage Murder and Photo Finish); Surfeit of Lampreys begins in New Zealand but continues in London.

Notably, Colour Scheme includes Māori people among its cast of characters, unusual for novels of the British mystery genre. This novel is said to further subvert the genre by incorporating elements of spy fiction and providing a veiled critique of the British Empire.

In 2018, HarperCollins Publishers released Money in the Morgue by Ngaio Marsh and Stella Duffy. The book was started by Marsh during World War II but abandoned. Working with just the book's title, first three chapters and some notes –but no idea of the plot or motive of the villain– Duffy completed the novel.

== Theatre ==
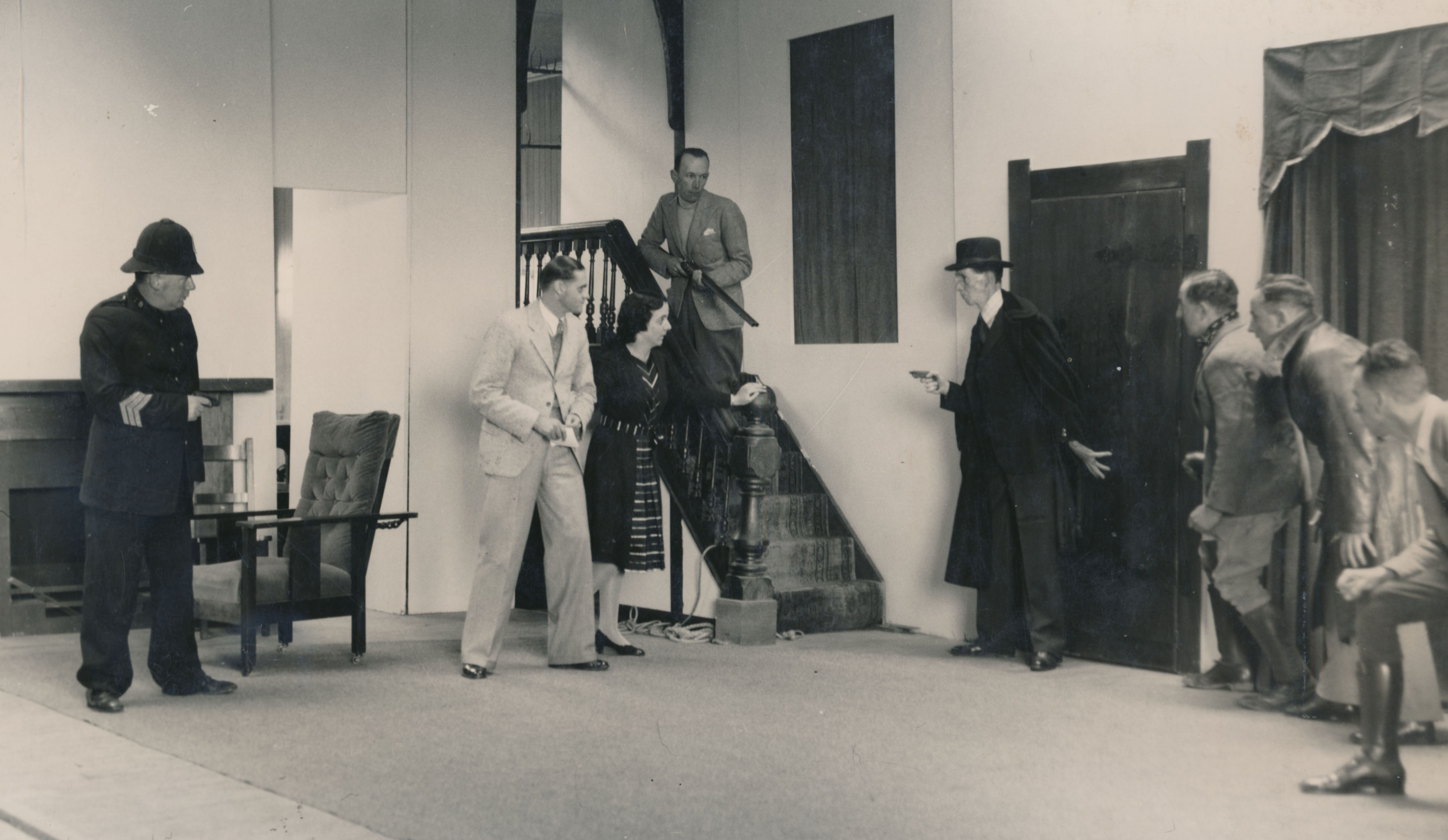
1940 Ashburton Repertory Society production of The Last Hour by Charles Bennett, produced by Ngaio Marsh (third from left)

Marsh's great passion was the theatre. In 1942 she produced a modern-dress Hamlet for the Canterbury University College Drama Society (now University of Canterbury Dramatic Society Incorporated or Dramasoc), the first of many Shakespearean productions with the society until 1969. In 1944, Hamlet and a production of Othello toured a theatre-starved New Zealand to rapturous acclaim. In 1949, assisted by entrepreneur Dan O'Connor, her student players toured Australia with a new version of Othello and Pirandello's Six Characters in Search of an Author. In the 1950s she was involved with the New Zealand Players, a relatively short-lived national professional touring repertory company. In 1972 she was invited by the Christchurch City Council to direct Shakespeare's Henry V, the inaugural production for the opening of the newly constructed James Hay Theatre in Christchurch; she made the unusual choice of casting two male leads, who alternated on different nights.

She lived to see New Zealand develop a viable professional theatre industry having realistic Arts Council support, with many of her protégés to the forefront. The 430-seat Ngaio Marsh Theatre at the University of Canterbury is named in her honour.

== Ngaio Marsh Theatre, University of Canterbury ==
In Haere-roa, the UCSA (University of Canterbury Student Association) building, is the iconic Ngaio Marsh Theatre. As well as being a theatre, it is also where events and lecture are held. UCSA's 160 clubs and societies use the space as well.

== Museum ==
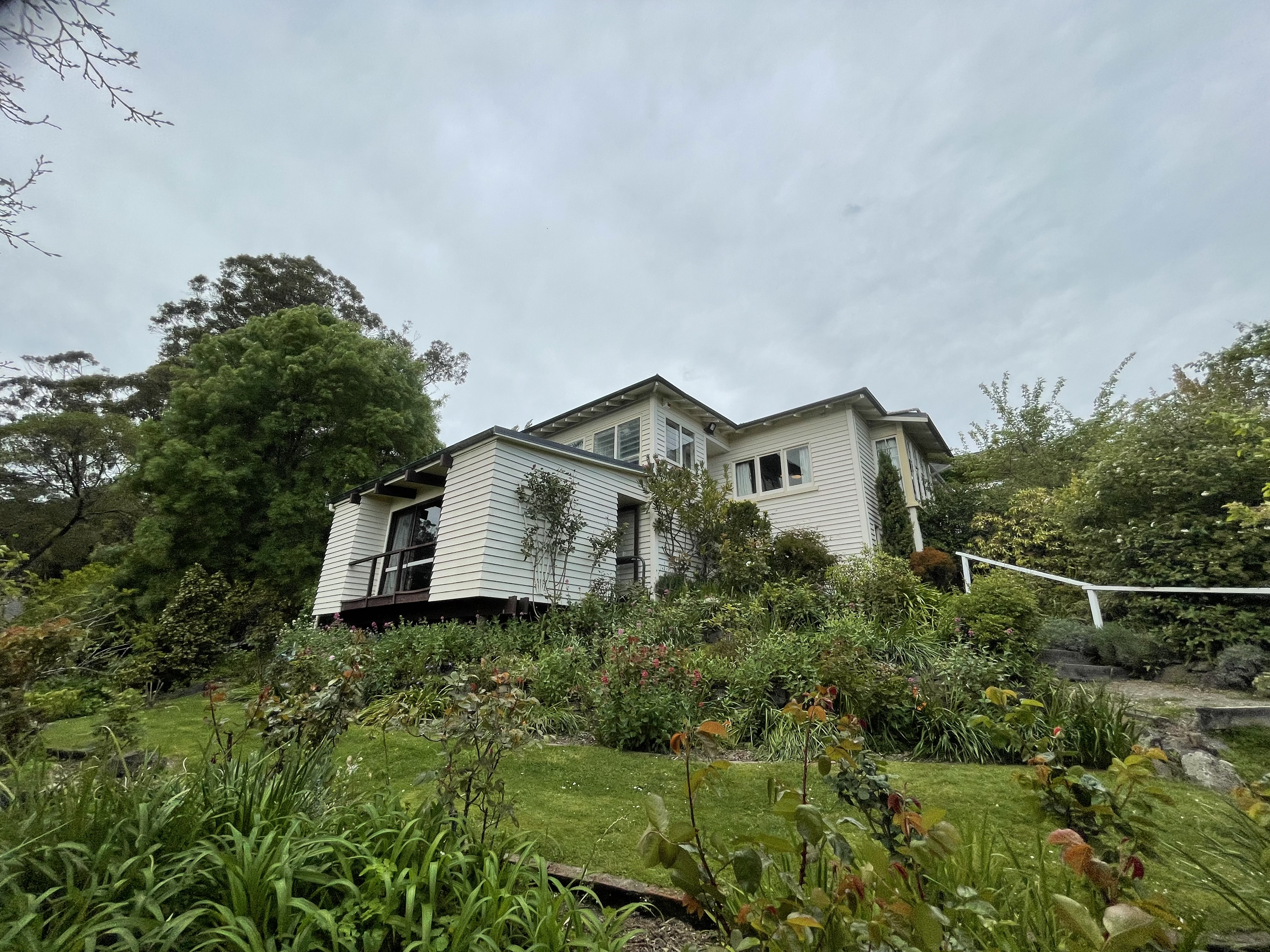
Dame Ngaio Marsh's Home

Her home, now known as Ngaio Marsh House, in Cashmere, a suburb of Christchurch on the northern slopes of the Port Hills, is preserved as a museum.

== Awards and honours ==
- 1948 – Appointed an Officer of the Order of the British Empire, for services in connexion with drama and literature in New Zealand, in the 1948 King's Birthday Honours
- 1962 – Conferred an honorary doctorate by the University of Canterbury
- 1966 – Appointed a Dame Commander of the Order of the British Empire, for services in the arts, especially writing and theatre production, in the 1966 Queen's Birthday Honours
- 1974 – Inducted into the Detection Club
- 1978 – Received the Grand Master Award for lifetime achievement as a detective novelist from the Mystery Writers of America
- 1989 – Honoured with a stamp by New Zealand Post as part of a New Zealand authors series
- 2015 – Honoured on 23 April 2015 with a Google Doodle

== Personal life ==
Marsh was unofficially engaged to Edward Bristed, who died in action in December 1917. She never married and had no children. She enjoyed close companionships with women, including her lifelong friend Sylvia Fox, but denied being lesbian, according to biographer Joanne Drayton. "I think Ngaio Marsh wanted the freedom of being who she was in a world, especially in a New Zealand that was still very conformist in its judgments of what constituted 'decent jokers, good Sheilas, and 'weirdos'", Roy Vaughan wrote after meeting her on a P&O Liner. A detective novel,"Blue Blood" (1997), by Stevan Eldred-Grigg in a pastiche of her style, portrays her in a lesbian relationship.

In 1965, she published an autobiography, Black Beech and Honeydew. British author and publisher Margaret Lewis wrote an authorized biography, Ngaio Marsh, A Life in 1991. New Zealand art historian Joanne Drayton's biography, Ngaio Marsh: Her Life in Crime was published in 2008. Towards the end of her life she systematically destroyed many of her papers, letters, documents and handwritten manuscripts.

Marsh died in Christchurch and was buried at the Church of the Holy Innocents at Mount Peel.

== Bibliography ==
=== Detective novels ===
All 33 novels, including one finished after Marsh's death, feature Chief Inspector Alleyn (later Chief Superintendent) of the Criminal Investigation Department, Metropolitan Police (London). The series is chronological: published and probably written in order of the fictional history. List (with the exception of Money in the Morgue) is from a list in The Collected Short Fiction of Ngaio Marsh ed. Douglas G. Greene (see below under Short Fiction).

1. A Man Lay Dead (1934)
2. Enter a Murderer (1935)
3. The Nursing Home Murder (1935)
4. Death in Ecstasy (1936)
5. Vintage Murder (1937). Marsh's working title was The Case of the Greenstone Tiki (Otago Daily Times, 13 March 1937)
6. Artists in Crime (1938)
7. Death in a White Tie (1938)
8. Overture to Death (1939)
9. Death at the Bar (1940)
10. Surfeit of Lampreys (1941); Death of a Peer in the U.S.
11. Death and the Dancing Footman (1941)
12. Colour Scheme (1943)
13. Died in the Wool (1945). Serialised: Wagga Wagga Daily Advertiser (1946)
14. Final Curtain (1947)
15. Swing Brother Swing (1949); A Wreath for Rivera in the U.S.. Serialised: Home Magazine (1949)
16. Opening Night (1951); Night at the Vulcan in the U.S. Serialised in the US, Woman's Day (1951). Serialised in abridged form in the UK, Woman's Journal, March to May 1951
17. Spinsters in Jeopardy (1953); abridged later in the U.S. as The Bride of Death (1955). Serialised in abridged form in the UK, Woman's Journal, October 1953 to January 1954
18. Scales of Justice (1955). Serialised: Australian Women's Weekly (1956). Serialised in abridged form in the UK, Woman's Journal, May to August 1955
19. Off With His Head (1956); Death of a Fool in the U.S.
20. Singing in the Shrouds (1958). Serialised: Australian Women's Weekly (1959). Serialised in abridged form in the UK, Woman's Journal, June to September 1958
21. False Scent (1959). Serialised: Australian Women's Weekly (1960). Serialised in abridged form in the UK, Woman's Journal, February to May 1960
22. Hand in Glove (1962). Serialised in abridged form in the UK, Woman's Journal, April to July 1962
23. Dead Water (1963)
24. Death at the Dolphin (1966); Killer Dolphin in the U.S.
25. Clutch of Constables (1968)
26. When in Rome (1970)
27. Tied Up in Tinsel (1972)
28. Black As He's Painted (1974)
29. Last Ditch (1977)
30. Grave Mistake (1978)
31. Photo Finish (1980)
32. Light Thickens (1982)

Posthumously published:

1. Money in the Morgue (2018;unfinished – completed by Stella Duffy)

=== Short fiction ===
- The Collected Short Fiction of Ngaio Marsh, ed. Douglas G. Greene, 1989 and 1991 editions (UK title Death on the Air and Other Stories, 1995). Includes:
  - Two essays:
    - "Roderick Alleyn"
    - "Portrait of Troy"
  - Three short stories featuring Alleyn:
    - Death on the Air. The Grand Magazine, February 1937. Co-authored with A Drummond Sharpe. (in both the 1989 and 1991 editions)
    - I Can Find My Way Out (1946—USA). (in both the 1989 and 1991 editions)
    - Chapter and Verse: The Little Copplestone Mystery (1974—USA). Republished 1936—NZ, 2009). (in both the 1989 and 1991 editions). Marsh's original title was 'Chapter and Verse'
  - Other short stories:
    - The Hand in the Sand. American Weekly, 15 March 1953. (in both the 1989 and 1991 editions)
    - The Cupid Mirror (1972). (in both the 1989 and 1991 editions)
    - A Fool about Money (1973—USA). Australian Women's Weekly, 19 February 1975. (in both the 1989 and 1991 editions)
    - Morepork (1979—USA). (in both the 1989 and 1991 editions)
    - The Figure Quoted. (Christchurch) Sun, Christmas 1927. Reprinted New Zealand Short Stories (1930, l ed. O N Gillespie). (only in the 1991 edition)
  - A television script:
    - Evil Liver, with an ending to be supplied by a jury chosen from the audience; Greene suggests 5 possible solutions.

==== Uncollected short stories ====
- Moonshine. (Christchurch) Sun, date unknown. Reprinted Yours and Mine: Stories by Young New Zealanders (1936: ed. Warwick Lawrence)
- My Poor Boy (1959)

=== Stage plays ===
- Noel. First performed at St Michael's Hall (1912)
- The Moon Princess. First performed at St Michael's Hall (1913)
- Mrs 'obson. First performed at St Michael's Hall (1914)
- So Much for Nothing. First performed at the Military Sanatorium (1921)
- Little House-Bound. First performed at Leeston Town Hall (1924)
- The Wyvern and the Unicorn (play), A Unicorn for Christmas (opera) libretto, music by David Farquhar, first performed by the New Zealand Opera Company, 1962

=== Letters ===
- Speech of New Zealanders. Press, 1 July 1939

=== Reviews ===
- Marie Tempest by Hector Bolitho. Press, 9 January 1937

=== Adapted works ===
- Exit Sir Derek by Henry Jellett, adapted from The Nursing Home Murder, unpublished at the time. First performed at the Little Theatre, Canterbury (1935)

=== Songs ===
- Columbine and Pantaloon. First performed at Choral Hall, Christchurch (1919)
- The Hawthorn Gate. First performed at Choral Hall, Christchurch (1920)
- The Gift. First performed at Choral Hall, Christchurch (1920)

=== Television plays ===
- Slipknot (1967) (Alleyn). Anthologised under Marsh's original title, 'A Knotty Problem', in Bodies from the Library: Volume 3, ed. Tony Medawar (HarperCollins, 2020)
- Evil Liver (script of an episode of the series Crown Court by Granada Television Ltd; recorded in England in 1975). Broadcast ITV, 23 August 1975. Collected in The Collected Short Fiction of Ngaio Marsh

=== Non-fiction books ===
- New Zealand (1942). Coauthored with Randal Mathews Burdon
- A Play Toward (1946)
- Black Beech and Honeydew (1965, autobiography; revised 1981)
- Singing Land (1974)

=== Short non-fiction articles ===
- The Night Train from Grey (published under the pseudonym Kowhai). Sun, 7 June 1919.
- The Novelist's Problem. Press, 22 December 1934
- Theatre: A Note on the Status Quo. Landfall, March 1947
- A National Theatre. Landfall, March 1949 (Co-authored with George Swan and Arnold F Goodwin)
- An Author's Defence of the Hackneyed Classics. ABC Weekly, 2 April 1949
- The Development of the Arts in New Zealand. Journal of the Royal Society of the Arts, 9 February 1951
- Theatre in a Young Country. Sydney Morning Herald, 29 April 1951
- New Zealand: Welfare Paradise. Holiday, November 1960
- The Quick Forge. Article within Shakespeare's Quatercentenary. Landfall, March 1964 (Coauthored with James Bertram, DF McKenzie, and Frank Sargeson)
- Stratford-upon-Avon. Atlantic Monthly, February 1967

== Adaptations ==
Two novels were adapted as television episodes in the 1960s; Death in Ecstasy in 1964 with Geoffrey Keen as Alleyn, and Artists in Crime in 1968 with Michael Allinson as Alleyn.

Four of the Alleyn novels were adapted for television in New Zealand and aired there in 1977 under the title Ngaio Marsh Theatre, with George Baker as Alleyn. Marsh appears in a cameo in the episode "Vintage Murder".

Nine were adapted as The Inspector Alleyn Mysteries and aired by the BBC in 1993 and 1994 (the pilot originally in 1990), with Simon Williams (pilot) and then Patrick Malahide as Alleyn.

In the 1990s the BBC made radio adaptations of Surfeit of Lampreys, A Man Lay Dead, Opening Night, and When in Rome starring Jeremy Clyde as Inspector Alleyn, and in 2010 Death and the Dancing Footman featuring Nigel Graham.

Ngaio Marsh co-wrote the 1951 episode Night at the Vulcan of the Philco Television Playhouse; and appeared as herself in the sixth episode The Central Problem in a television series of the unfinished Charles Dickens mystery novel The Mystery of Edwin Drood.
