= Robert Speight =

British-born New Zealand geologist (1867–1949)

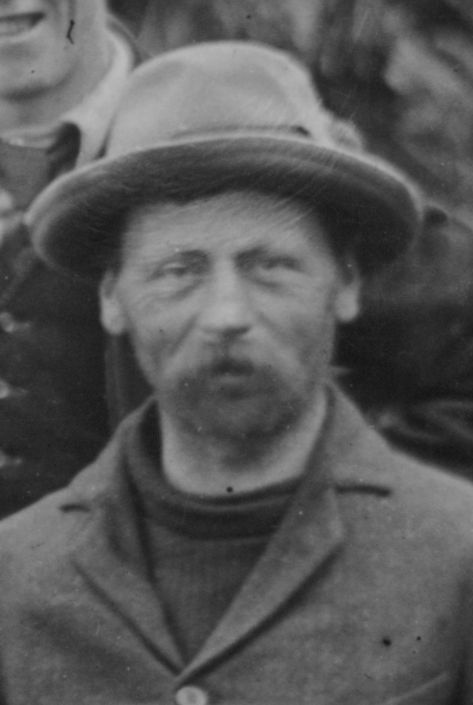
Speight in 1907

Robert Speight (2 October 1867 – 8 September 1949) was a British-born New Zealand geologist, university professor and museum curator.

== Early life ==
Speight was born in Stockton-on-Tees, Durham, England in 1867. When he was about 12, his family emigrated to New Zealand. His father, a strong disciplinarian, was a teacher at the school at Tai Tapu, which is a rural village some 9 kilometres (5.6 mi) south of the Christchurch suburb of Halswell. Robert Speight gained a scholarship at Christchurch Boys' High School and it is said that his daily travels along the foot of the Port Hills, an extinct shield volcano, raised his interest in volcanology. His father transferred to St. Albans School and the family moved to Christchurch, and Speight continued his education at Canterbury College. He graduated in 1888 with a Bachelor of Arts, and in 1889 with a Master of Arts with first class honours in mathematics.

== Professional career ==
Speight took a teaching position at his secondary school and studied science part-time under Frederick Hutton, graduating in 1891 with a Bachelor of Science. When Hutton retired his teaching position from Canterbury College in 1903, Speight succeeded him as a lecturer, while retaining his teaching position at Boys' High for some more years.

Speight was appointed assistant curator of Canterbury Museum in 1911, and was full director from March 1914 to November 1935. During his career, Speight published 130 papers and reports, which span a wide area of earth science. Geographically, he mostly published Canterbury topics, but also the Kermadec Islands and the New Zealand Subantarctic Islands (which he visited in 1907). His papers on past worldwide climate changes and their causes gained him international attention, and he was elected to fellowships of the Geological Society of America and the Geological Society of London. He was also a fellow of the New Zealand Institute, and was the organisation's president from 1933 for two years and during that time, the name was changed to Royal Society of New Zealand in reference to the Royal Society based in London.

The New Zealand Institute awarded Speight the Hector Memorial Medal in 1921, at the time its highest award. He was awarded the King George V Silver Jubilee Medal in 1935.

== Family and death ==
On 4 January 1899, he married Ruth Mary Seager at St Michael's Church in central Christchurch. His wife was the sister of Rose Elizabeth Seager, the mother of the writer Ngaio Marsh. Ruth and Robert Speight's three children all went to live overseas, so after his wife died in 1941 his life was lonely. He died at St George's Hospital on 8 September 1949, aged 81.
