= Overture to Death =

1939 novel by Ngaio Marsh

- First US edition
- Author: Ngaio Marsh
- Language: English
- Series: Roderick Alleyn
- Genre: Detective fiction
- Publisher: Geoffrey Bles; Lee Furman (US)
- Publication date: 1939
- Media type: Print
- Preceded by: Death in a White Tie
- Followed by: Death at the Bar

Overture to Death is a detective novel by Ngaio Marsh; it is the eighth novel to feature Roderick Alleyn, and was first published in 1939. The plot concerns a murder during an amateur theatrical performance in a Dorset village, which Alleyn and his colleague Fox are dispatched from Scotland Yard to investigate and duly solve.

== Plot summary ==
In the picturesque village of Vale-of-Pen-Cuckoo, tensions are running high amongst the seven people who gather to discuss a charity production to raise funds for a new church piano. The local squire, Jocelyn Jerningham, disapproves of his son's, Henry, relationship with Dinah Copeland, the rector's daughter. The Jerninghams are somewhat impoverished nobles and Henry needs to marry a wealthy woman in order to maintain the estate of Pen Cuckoo. Jocelyn's cousin, Eleanor Prentice, is a sexless spinster who is madly in love with Rector Copeland and also disapproves of Henry and Dinah's relationship. Miss Prentice's best friend, Idris Campanula, is also in love with the rector and the two spinsters are sometimes competitors. They both disapprove of newcomer Selia Ross who is apparently having an affair with Dr Templett who has an invalid wife. When Mrs Ross suggests they put on a production of "Shop Windows", everyone is in agreement except the two spinsters who are outnumbered.

Rehearsals do not go well as several actors refuse to take the production seriously and Miss Prentice and Miss Campanula argue over who should play the opening overture. Eventually they decide that Miss Prentice will open the play with 'Venetian Suite' by Ethelbert Nevin. She develops a painful finger and drops out minutes before the production begins on Saturday evening. Miss Campanula sits down at the piano to play Sergei Rachmaninoff's familiar Prelude in C-sharp minor and is promptly shot dead by a Colt 32 that was hidden in the piano.

In the aftermath of the murder, Campanula's estate passes to the rector, an outcome that also benefits his daughter, Dinah

Chief Inspector Roderick Alleyn investigates and quickly learns a mischievous child named Georgie Biggins had, the day before, rigged the piano with his 'Twiddletoy' and water pistol so that water would squirt whenever someone pressed the soft pedal. However, the water pistol was replaced with Jocelyn's revolver sometime on Saturday, the day of the murder. Everyone knew about Jocelyn's revolver and could have sneaked into the rectory hall to rig the piano. A young volunteer tells Alleyn that she played the piano and used the soft pedal not an hour before Miss Campanula was murdered. There must be another aspect to the revolver.

Alleyn wonders if the intended victim was Miss Prentice, asking her if she has enemies. Her reply is indirect. He considers how she backed down from the piano solo minutes before the murder. The two are both disliked. Both use confession to the rector to complain about the other. Each attacks a different couple with threats.

Alleyn concludes the intended victim was always Miss Campanula. The revolver was rigged in such a way that the safety catch could easily be turned on and off, and was on when the young volunteer played. Had the intended victim been Miss Prentice, the murderer could have easily switched the safety off quickly and easily in full view of the audience.

Since the victim was always intended to be Miss Campanula, Alleyn reasons her killer can only be Miss Prentice. Only Miss Prentice knows she might drop out of the piano solo at the last minute. The competition between the two women comes to a head on Saturday evening when Eleanor misinterprets a hug Miss Campanula gave to the rector. This sent her into a tailspin and led her to murder her best friend.

The Jerninghams suggest Miss Prentice may be insane. Alleyn disagrees and thinks she is playing up for leniency.

== Characters ==
- Chief Inspector Roderick Alleyn
- Inspector Fox
- Nigel Bathgate
- Sergeants Bailey and Thompson
- Jocelyn Jerningham - the local squire
- Henry Jerningham - his son
- Eleanor Prentice - his spinster cousin, moved in 3 years earlier when his wife died.
- Walter Copeland - the rector
- Dinah Copeland - the rector's daughter
- Idris Campanula - a wealthy spinster
- William Templett - the local doctor
- Selia Ross - an attractive widow
- Georgie Biggins - a mischievous child

It is the third novel to feature Alleyn's love interest, the painter Agatha Troy. Although she does not appear, she is engaged to marry Alleyn, who writes to her, outlining the kind of marriage he hopes they will enjoy. By the next book, they are married. To make way for this new direction in her detective's progress, Marsh put aside the character of Nigel Bathgate, Alleyn's original 'Watson'. The journalist makes one of his final appearances in this novel.

== Development ==
Biographer Margaret Lewis describes how "her extended stays with the Rhodes family in various country houses... gave Ngaio the material she needed for several novels. Overture to Death is set in the kind of idiosyncratic country village that she knew well. Character dominates the novel... [T]he New Statesman reviewer accused the writer of treating crime fiction 'as a convenient vase to arrange her characters in'. Other reviewers admired her talent for developing character and were soon recommending that she forget detection and concentrate on straight fiction instead.

== Themes ==
In her more recent Marsh biography, Joanne Drayton discusses at some length Overture to Death's central theme of love pursued, frustrated or fulfilled, contrasting the forbidden Henry-Dinah romance with the toxic Idris-Eleanor rivalry for the Rector's affections. Drayton also compares Alleyn's developing love interest in Troy with the late 1930s development of parallel love interests into marriage for Dorothy L Sayers' Lord Peter Wimsey and Margery Allingham's Albert Campion, whereas Agatha Christie's series detectives Hercule Poirot and Jane Marple are characters definitively unsusceptible to a credible love interest, which Agatha Christie is quoted as finding "a terrible bore in detective stories".

== Reception ==
The novel is a classic example of what crime writer Colin Watson termed "The Mayhem Parva School" of genteel English village murder mystery from the "Golden Age" between the world wars. Despite the ingeniously gruesome murder method, it is essentially a social comedy of manners, with the amusingly awful rivalry between two ageing spinster ladies to dominate their cosy little society of village, church and charitable affairs, each performing a favourite piano piece on every possible occasion, reminiscent of E F Benson's Mapp and Lucia novels of the same period.

In writing Marsh’s obituary in The New York Times in 1982, Jennifer Dunning recalled this novel for its humour, while forgetting the exact title of the novel as well as some of the plot details.”She was also known for her humor. … In Prelude to Death, the victim is an amateur pianist who insists on playing Rachmaninoff's Prelude in C Minor at every opportunity. He is shot dead on the piano bench at the opening chord.”

In a 1945 article in The New Yorker, "Who Cares Who Killed Roger Ackroyd?", the American literary critic Edmund Wilson (1895-1972) strongly criticized the artificiality and literary shortcomings of the classic Golden Age whodunit. This is quoted in many subsequent studies of crime fiction, including Howard Haycraft's 1946 The Art of the Mystery Story. Wilson singles out the Queens of Crime of the "English genteel" school, including Dorothy L. Sayers and Ngaio Marsh, whose The Nine Tailors and Overture To Death respectively are subjected to criticism. Thus Wilson on Overture To Death:

"It would be impossible, I should think, for anyone with the faintest feeling for words to describe the unappetizing sawdust which Miss Marsh has poured into her pages as 'excellent prose' or as prose at all except in the sense that distinguishes prose from verse. And here again the book is mostly padding. There is the notion that you could commit a murder by rigging up a gun in a piano, so that the victim will shoot himself when he presses down the pedal, but this embedded in the dialogue and doings of a lot of faked-up English country people who are even more tedious than those of The Nine Tailors. "
