= Ngaio Marsh House =

Historic house in Christchurch, New Zealand

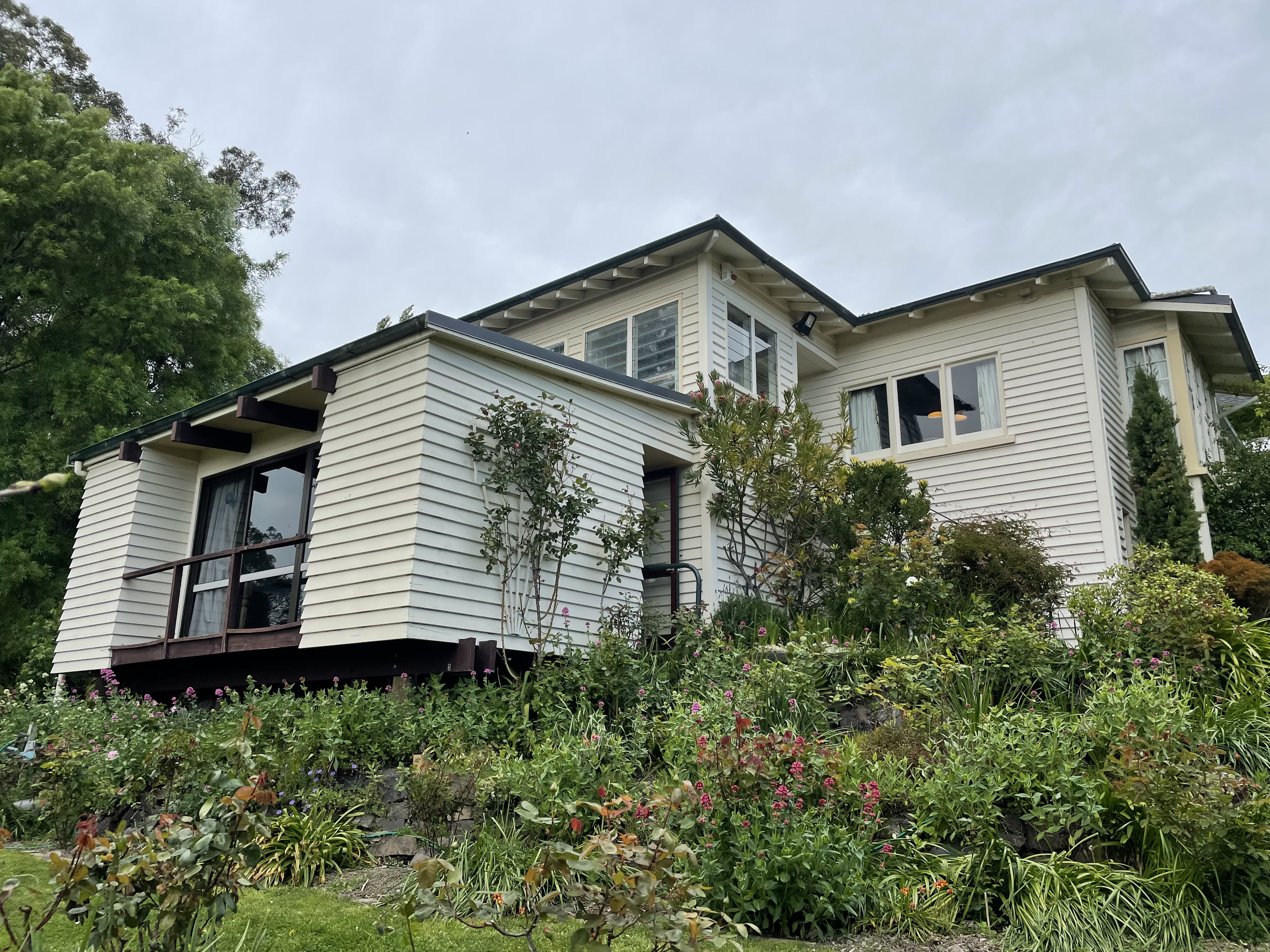
- Ngaio Marsh House in 2021
- Interactive map of the Ngaio Marsh House area

General information
- Type: Residential home
- Location: Cashmere, 37 Valley Road, Christchurch, New Zealand
- Coordinates: 43°34′19″S 172°37′36″E

Height
- Roof: Iron

Technical details
- Structural system: timber
- Floor count: two

Design and construction
- Architect: Samuel Hurst Seager

Renovating team
- Architects: Helmore and Cotteril (1948); Don Donnithore (1980)

Heritage New Zealand – Category 1
- Designated: 27 June 1985
- Reference no.: 3673

Ngaio Marsh House, the home of Dame Ngaio Marsh for most her life, is a heritage property in Valley Road in the Christchurch suburb of Cashmere. It serves as a museum to Dame Ngaio, one of New Zealand's most famous cultural figures and one of the original Queens of Crime from the Golden Age of Detective Fiction, alongside Agatha Christie, Dorothy L Sayers, and Margery Allingham. It is registered as a Category I heritage place by Heritage New Zealand for its outstanding historical significance in relation to Marsh. Tours of the house, run by a volunteer guide, can be booked via the website.

== History ==
The house was built for Ngaio Marsh's parents. It was designed by their relation architect Samuel Hurst Seager. The house has been extended a number of times: firstly in 1948 by architectural firm Helmore and Cotterill; and later, in 1980, a studio, designed by Don Donnithorne, was added on the ground floor.

=== Heritage registration ===
The building was registered as a Category I heritage building by the New Zealand Historic Places Trust (now Heritage New Zealand) on 27 June 1985, with registration number 3673.

== Gallery ==
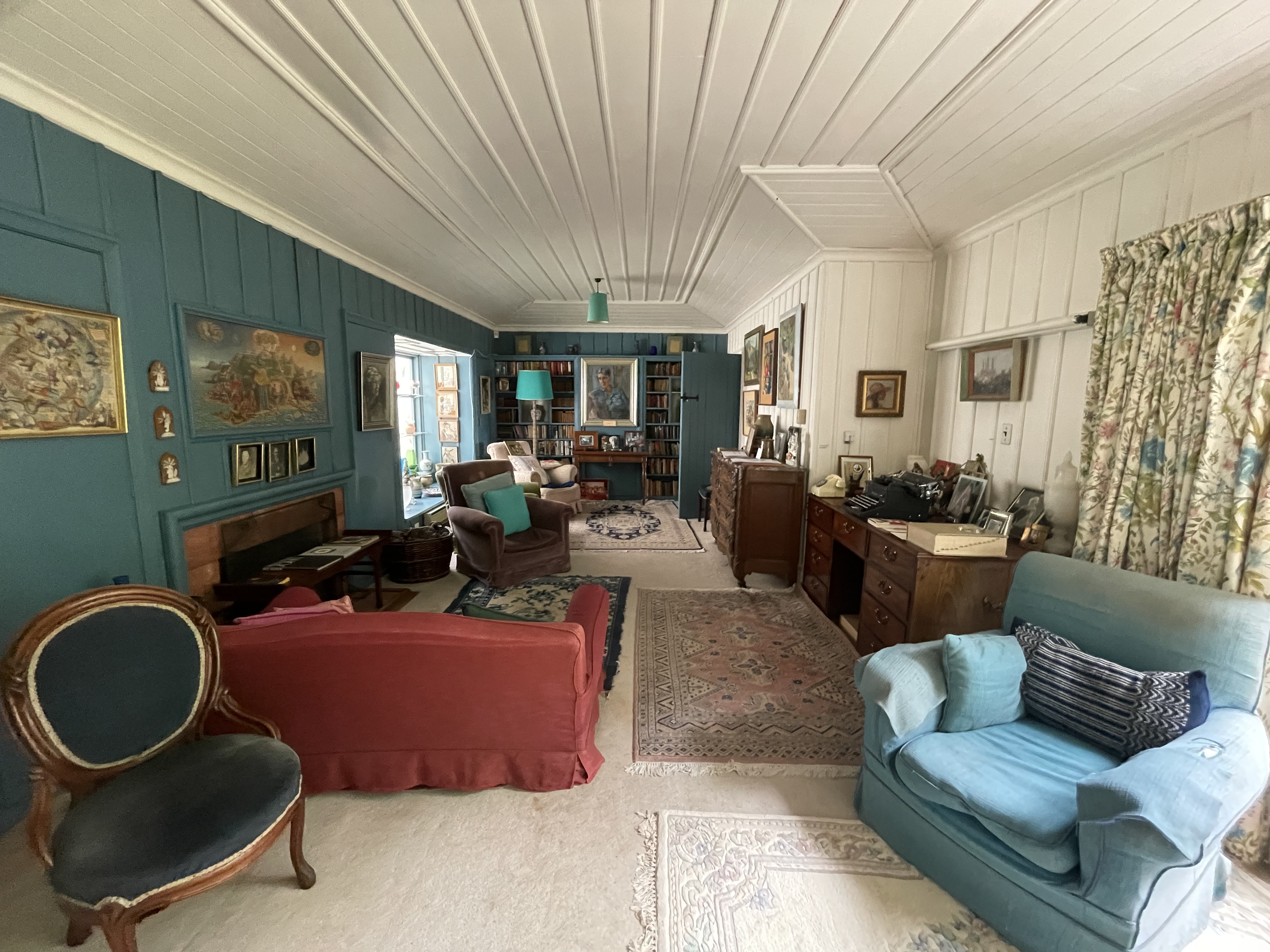
The "long room", which was originally part of a bedroom that was extended in 1948 into a living room

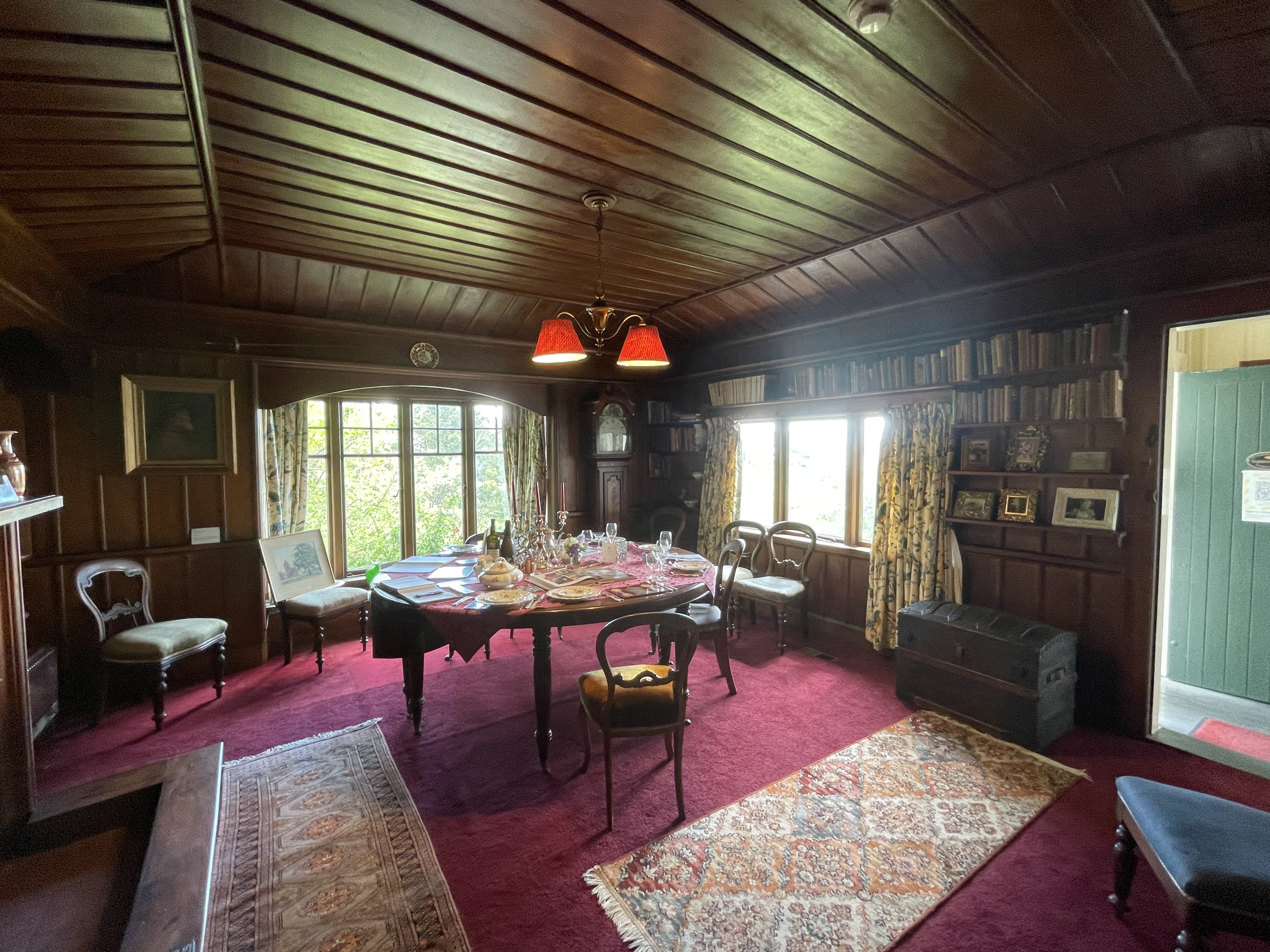
The original Samuel Hurst Seager dining room

== See also ==
- List of historic places in Christchurch
