= Opening Night (novel) =

1951 detective novel by Ngaio Marsh

- First edition
- Author: Ngaio Marsh
- Language: English
- Series: Roderick Alleyn
- Genre: Detective fiction, Theatre-fiction
- Publisher: Collins Crime Club
- Publication date: 1951
- Media type: Print
- Preceded by: Swing Brother Swing
- Followed by: Spinsters in Jeopardy

Opening Night is a detective novel by Ngaio Marsh; it is the sixteenth novel to feature Roderick Alleyn, and was first published in 1951. It was published in the United States as Night at the Vulcan.

== Plot summary ==
The novel is one of the theatrical ones for which Marsh was best known, and concerns the murder of an actor backstage on opening night of a new play in London. The play is being performed at the Vulcan Theatre; it was formerly known as the Jupiter Theatre, renamed after an infamous murder recounted in the Alleyn short story "I Can Find My Way Out". The old crime is referenced in the text.

Martyn Tarne, a young and inexperienced actress from New Zealand, finds herself involved in a play where her own heredity plays a significant role in a minor part. As the understudy for a minor role, Martyn is caught up when Inspector Roderick Alleyn begins investigating a murder made to appear a suicide.

The book also sees the return of Lord Michael Lamprey. A child witness in A Surfeit of Lampreys (American title Death of a Peer), he was a civilian eager to join the police force in "I Can Find My Way Out", and he appears in Opening Night as a police constable attached to the CID.

== Television adaptation ==
Opening Night was one of four Alleyn novels adapted for South Pacific Television in 1977 as Ngaio Marsh Theatre; Alleyn was played by George Baker.
