= Died in the Wool =

1945 detective novel by Ngaio Marsh

- First UK edition
- Author: Ngaio Marsh
- Language: English
- Series: Roderick Alleyn
- Genre: Detective fiction
- Publisher: Collins Crime Club (UK); Little, Brown (US)
- Publication date: 1945
- Preceded by: Colour Scheme
- Followed by: Final Curtain

Died in the Wool is a detective novel by Ngaio Marsh; it is the thirteenth novel to feature Roderick Alleyn, and was first published in 1945. The novel is set in New Zealand, and involves death on a sheep farm.

== Synopsis ==
The novel concerns the murder of a New Zealand parliamentarian on a remote sheep farm on the Canterbury Region of the South Island of New Zealand, said to be located in Mackenzie country near Aoraki / Mount Cook. Mount Cook is referred to as the "Cloud-Piercer", the highest in a series of several peaks surrounding the high plateau where most of the action occurs). Like the previous novel in the series (Colour Scheme) the story takes place during World War II when Alleyn is doing counter-espionage work.

The format of the book is somewhat unusual, in that Alleyn does not arrive at the scene of the murder until fifteen months after it has taken place, and much of his detecting is founded upon stories told him by the chief witnesses in the case.

== Television adaptation ==
Died in the Wool was one of four Alleyn novels adapted for South Pacific Television in 1977. Alleyn was played by George Baker.
