= Henry Jellett (priest) =

Irish Anglican priest

Henry Jellett (1821- 31 December 1901) was an Irish Anglican priest. He was Dean of St Patrick's Cathedral, Dublin in the Church of Ireland from 1889 to 1901.

== Early life ==
Jellett came from a well-known Cork family, and was born in 1821. He attended Trinity College, Dublin, graduated with a degree in Moral Philosophy in 1841, and was ordained deacon in 1844 and priest the following year.

== Ecclesiastical career ==
Jellett spent the following 45 years of his ministry in South Ireland, where he was Rector of Ahinagh (in the Diocese of Cloyne) from 1853 to 1889. From 1871 he was also a Chaplain to the Bishop of Cork, and in 1884 was appointed Archdeacon of Cloyne.

In 1889 he was elected Dean of St Patrick's Cathedral, Dublin, where he had for several years been a canon. He was a "High Churchman of the old school, and his opinions were not those which were popular among Irish clergy". He had been considered as bishop in the diocese of Cork in the late 1870s, but was not elected. When he was elected Dean ten years later, rumor had it was by a narrow majority of one vote.

His obituary in The Times describe him as probably, next to the Primate (Dr. Alexander), the most capable preacher in Ireland … He always had something to say, and his magnificent delivery and venerable bearing lent weight to his words.

Jellett died in his post on New Year's Eve 1901.

He was the author of the following two books:

- The Irish Church and the Articles of 1615
- Some Thoughts on the Christian Life

== Family ==
His brother was John Hewitt Jellett (1817-1888), Provost of Trinity College, Dublin, and another brother was Serjeant H. P. Jellett, KC, a member of the Irish Bar.

He married his cousin Elizabeth Morgan, daughter of James Morgan, of Cork. They had eight children, of whom three survived him. Their son, also called Henry Jellett, achieved eminence as a gynaecologist and author.

Church of Ireland titles
Preceded by John West	Dean of St Patrick's Cathedral, Dublin; 1889–1901	Succeeded by John Henry Bernard
