= Colour Scheme =

1943 detective novel by Ngaio Marsh

- First UK edition
- Author: Ngaio Marsh
- Language: English
- Series: Roderick Alleyn
- Genre: Detective fiction
- Publisher: Collins Crime Club
- Publication date: 1943
- Media type: Print
- Preceded by: Death and the Dancing Footman
- Followed by: Died in the Wool

Colour Scheme is a detective novel by Ngaio Marsh; it is the twelfth novel to feature Roderick Alleyn, and was first published in 1943 by Collins Crime Club. The novel takes place in the Northland region of New Zealand during World War II; the plot involves suspected espionage activity at a hot springs resort on the coast of New Zealand's Northland region.

Marsh's next novel Died in the Wool also places Alleyn in New Zealand doing wartime counterespionage work.

== Background ==
According to her biographers Margaret Lewis and Joanne Drayton, for most of her adult life, Ngaio Marsh divided her time between her native New Zealand and travel abroad, with frequent and often prolonged periods spent in England, where most of her detective fiction is set. World War Two interrupted this pattern, obliging Ngaio Marsh to remain in New Zealand from April 1938 until June 1949, when she finally returned to England for another lengthy stay. During this ten-year period, Marsh lived with her elderly father on the outskirts of Christchurch, continued to write, drove a Red Cross transport vehicle and began her dedicated project to develop a professional theatre in New Zealand, working with students from Canterbury University, directing, producing and touring plays around the country. Again, according to her biographers, this had an inevitable and interesting effect on her detective fiction.

Marsh was commissioned by her publishers Collins to write one of their series of illustrated books for schools, The British Commonwealth In Pictures, and she travelled the country extensively while writing her contribution, New Zealand, published in 1942. Since her 1938 return to New Zealand, four Roderick Alleyn mysteries had been written and published (Overture To Death, Death At The Bar, Surfeit Of Lampreys and Death And The Dancing Footman), all set in England. Now in 1942, Marsh decided to set her next two novels (Colour Scheme and Died In The Wool) in New Zealand, dispatching her series detective Roderick Alleyn there, to investigate wartime espionage. Although Marsh published two further New Zealand-set Alleyn mysteries (Vintage Murder 1937, Photo Finish 1980), the two wartime New Zealand novels stand distinctly apart from her main body of detective fiction.

== Plot summary ==
In New Zealand's North Island, near the fictional coastal town of Harpoon, the Claire family operates a guest house at the Wai-ata-tapu hot springs. Colonel Claire struggles to turn a profit, and businessman Maurice Questing is eager to call up his loan and seize the resort.

Meanwhile, Colonel Claire's brother-in-law, Dr James Ackrington, writes to Inspector Roderick Alleyn alerting him that Questing may be an enemy agent. Son Simon Claire observes flashing Morse Code signals from Rangi Peak and feels Questing must be a spy for the enemy; soon after an allied ship leaving a New Zealand port is sunk. In addition, the local Maori leaders suspect Questing is a treasure hunter seeking to loot sacred Maori items.

No one much likes Questing: alcoholic handyman, Bert Smith, accuses Questing of trying to murder him by sending him across a railway with a train coming, claiming the crossing signal was green when it was red.

Shakespearean actor Geoffrey Gaunt is advised by his Australian doctor to stay at Wai-ata-tapu to heal his ailing leg. Gaunt arrives and settles in, using the baths. He and his secretary Dikon Bell notice the Claires' daughter, Barbara, always in worn out clothes. Gaunt purchases a fashionable outfit for Barbara from a shop in Auckland, and sends it to her anonymously. She is happy, but cannot guess who sent it.

Questing next tells Smith that the signal was broken, and still later that he looked at the signal through a coloured windscreen. Dikon Bell is a reliable person, trusted by both Simon and his sister Barbara.

A newcomer arrives at the guest house named Septimus Falls, having seen an ad for the place. Falls taps in Morse code leading Simon to suspect Falls is an enemy ally of Questing.

Everyone comes together at a concert put on by the Te Rarawa community in their village hall, in honour of Geoffrey Gaunt, who delivers speeches from select plays, and Questing makes an annoying speech. Some people return to the guest house walking through the area of boiling mud pools and hot springs, while others ride home in a car, taking the road.

Questing does not return and a horrific scream suggests that he has fallen into Taupo-tapu, the huge boiling mud pool. According to Maori legend a dishonoured Te Rarawa girl met this fatal end with a similar, terrible shriek.

Police begin investigating Questing's disappearance by searching the mud pool and interviewing people. Police recover boots and a vest from the boiling pool first.

The group at Wai-ata-tapu each tells how he got home that evening and who they saw. Police interviews make them nervous. Theories as to whether Questing is dead or alive become moot when the police find Questing's skull at the mud pool.

The police find a historic Maori battle adze at the home of Questing that belonged to the local chief Rua's grandfather. Its original location was considered a secret known only to a few select Maori people. Huia, the Claires' housekeeper, admits she overheard her grandfather Rua talking about the adze and told a friend who then told Bert Smith its location. Smith fetched it for Questing. Rua is livid, eventually allowing police to hold it until the case is cleared.

Police find a large hoard of Maori relics alongside the adze, illegal to take or hold. A letter left to Bell from Questing, written before the concert, indicates his plan to leave the country for Australia.

Falls leads a discussion at the guest house where he posits that Questing is colourblind, explaining many lies he told regarding colours because he rarely admitted this physical fact to anyone. He could not distinguish a red from green.

Falls deduces that Smith, the alcoholic handyman, was the only person who fits as the killer of Questing. Smith wore hobnail boots to remove a crucial white trail flag during the concert and tossed them in that mud pool, which boots the police later found. Questing told Smith about his colourblindness to explain the mishap with the traffic signal. Smith lures Questing into the mud pool by removing the white trail flag for the safe path. Questing follows the red flags, which signal danger.

Smith is taken in custody, and known by police to be an enemy agent. Gaunt will head to London. The Claire family is free of the debt to Questing. Dickon Bell decides to try once more to enlist, and asks Barbara, whom he loves, to write to him. Her father gives the gift of clothes back to Gaunt.

Detective Sergeant Webley gains praise from Septimus Falls. Falls reveals himself to the police to be Roderick Alleyn, working undercover for the military during World War II.

== Characters ==
- Chief-Inspector Roderick Alleyn of Scotland Yard
- Colonel Edward and Agnes Claire – owners of Wai-ata-tapu
- Simon Claire – their son, 19 years old
- Barbara Claire – their daughter, 23 years old
- Dr James Ackrington – Agnes Claire's brother
- Geoffrey Gaunt – a celebrated actor
- Dikon Bell – his secretary
- Alfred Colly – Gaunt's dresser
- Maurice Questing – a businessman
- Bert Smith – an alcoholic handyman
- Rua Te Kahu– Maori chief
- Septimus Falls – a guest at Wai-ata-tapu
- Huia – Maori housekeeper at Wai-ata-tapu
- Eru Saul — half caste man, sometime friend to Huia
- Detective Sergeant Webley

== Reception ==
Dorothy Cameron Disney wrote in The New York Times that this mystery novel, “civilized literature”, excels on many aspects in a strongly positive review. It has humor, creates a good atmosphere, and “a group of characters, English, Maori and New Zealander, who are fascinating and completely credible.” She calls out the sinister Questing and the irascible and candid Dr James Ackrington, brother of Mrs Claire, the actor Geoffrey Gaunt, and the “cerebral secretary” Dikon Bell, as characters well portrayed.

The Illustrated London News wrote, "The only true detective novel this month is by Ngaio Marsh - and what a good one it is... as lively a tale as heart could wish."

In a 1988 article in The New York Times, Gwenyth Jones describes trips through New Zealand using the several Marsh novels set in that country. She notes that the scene of Colour Scheme is the hardest to place, suggesting “Ngawha Springs guest house near Kaikohe, on New Zealand's North Island,” with a nearby port city as the most likely match. Jones remarked that Marsh uses “the spectacular scenery of New Zealand to great effect in her books.”

One reviewer gave a positive review, liking the well-drawn characters. He proposes that there are three mysteries in this novel: “who is the spy, who murdered Questing, and where is Alleyn?”

== Television adaptation ==
Colour Scheme was one of four Alleyn novels adapted for South Pacific Television in 1977. Alleyn was played by George Baker.
