= Henry Jellett (gynaecologist) =

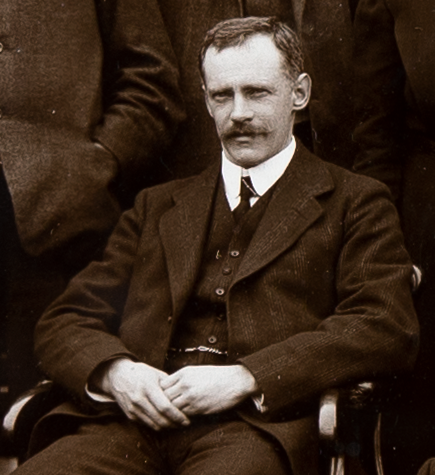
- Born: 1872
- Died: 8 June 1948 (aged 75–76)
- Medical career
- Field: gynaecology
- Institutions: Trinity College Dublin; Rotunda Hospital

Henry Jellett (1872–1948) was an eminent Irish gynaecologist, and author.

Jellet was born at Killinardrish, County Cork, Ireland on the 29 May 1872. His father, also called Henry Jellett, was Dean of St Patrick's Cathedral, Dublin from 1889 until his death in 1901. Jellett was educated at Trinity College Dublin, where he was later Professor of Midwifery. He was Master (consultant) of the Rotunda Hospital, Dublin from 1910 to 1914 when he resigned to serve in World War I. During the war he was Commandant of the Munro Ambulance Corps in Northern Flanders and was Mentioned in Despatches, also winning the Chevalier de l’Ordre de la Couronne de Belgique and the Croix de Guerre, Française (with two stars). He resumed his post as Master of the Rotunda from 1917 to 1919.

After threats to his life from the Irish Republican Army he emigrated to New Zealand in 1920 where he practised in Christchurch and was appointed advisory obstetrician to the Department of Health from 1924 to 1931. He was appointed to address the issue of maternal mortality.

At a time in the 1920s when maternity care was the purview of midwives Jellett's view was that normal births could be attended by midwives without a doctor in attendance. He published proposals for midwifery services for normal births without doctors which was not the prevailing view of the New Zealand Obstetrical Society which believed births should be attended by a doctor and midwife or doctor and maternity nurse. However like Doris Gordon he did support post-graduate training for doctors, teaching hospitals and the establishment of a chair in obstetrics and gynaecology at the University of Otago. Jellett's support for better training was because he believed there was too great a risk of caesarian sections being performed to compensate for poor obstetrical training and experience.

Jellett was charged with dangerous driving in 1926 after knocking down a cyclist but the case against him was dismissed. He died in Christchurch on 8 June 1948.

== Publications ==
- A Short Practice of Midwifery (1903)
- A Practice of Gynæcology (1916)
- The Causes and Prevention of Maternal Mortality (1929)
- The Nursing Home Murder (novel with Ngaio Marsh 1935)
- A Short Practice of Midwifery for Nurses (1937)
- Wisha, God Help Us! (play 1941)
