= Ngaio Marsh Theatre =

Rebuilt theatre in Christchurch, New Zealand

Coordinates: 43°31′27″S 172°34′50″E

- Interactive map of Ngaio Marsh Theatre
- Capacity: 330 seated, 1000 standing

Construction
- Opened: 1967; 2019
- Demolished: October 2016

Website
- https://ucsa.org.nz/venue/ngaio-marsh-theatre-haere-roa/

The Ngaio Marsh Theatre is a theatre at the University of Canterbury Students' Association in Christchurch, New Zealand.

The Ngaio Marsh theatre was named in honour of Dame Ngaio Marsh, who was a director and patron of theatre, especially Shakespeare, at the university between 1942 and 1969, and indeed the theatre's opening production — Shakespeare's Twelfth Night — was directed by Marsh in 1967. The theatre replaced the Little Theatre, which had been destroyed by fire in 1948.

The theatre was extensively damaged during the 2011 Christchurch earthquakes, and was subsequently demolished in October 2016.

The rebuilt theatre, within Haere-roa, the University of Canterbury Students’ Association building at 90 Ilam Road in Christchurch, New Zealand, was officially opened on 2 August 2019. The opening involved a student production of Shakespeare's A Midsummer Night's Dream, chosen because actor and honorary alumnus Sam Neill had appeared in a production directed by Ngaio Marsh in 1969.

The new theatre is available for short-term or long-term hire. Full AV and technical facilities and orchestra pit are available. A retractable seating structure allows for capacity of 330 seated and 1000 standing.
