= Joanne Drayton =

New Zealand art historian and biographer

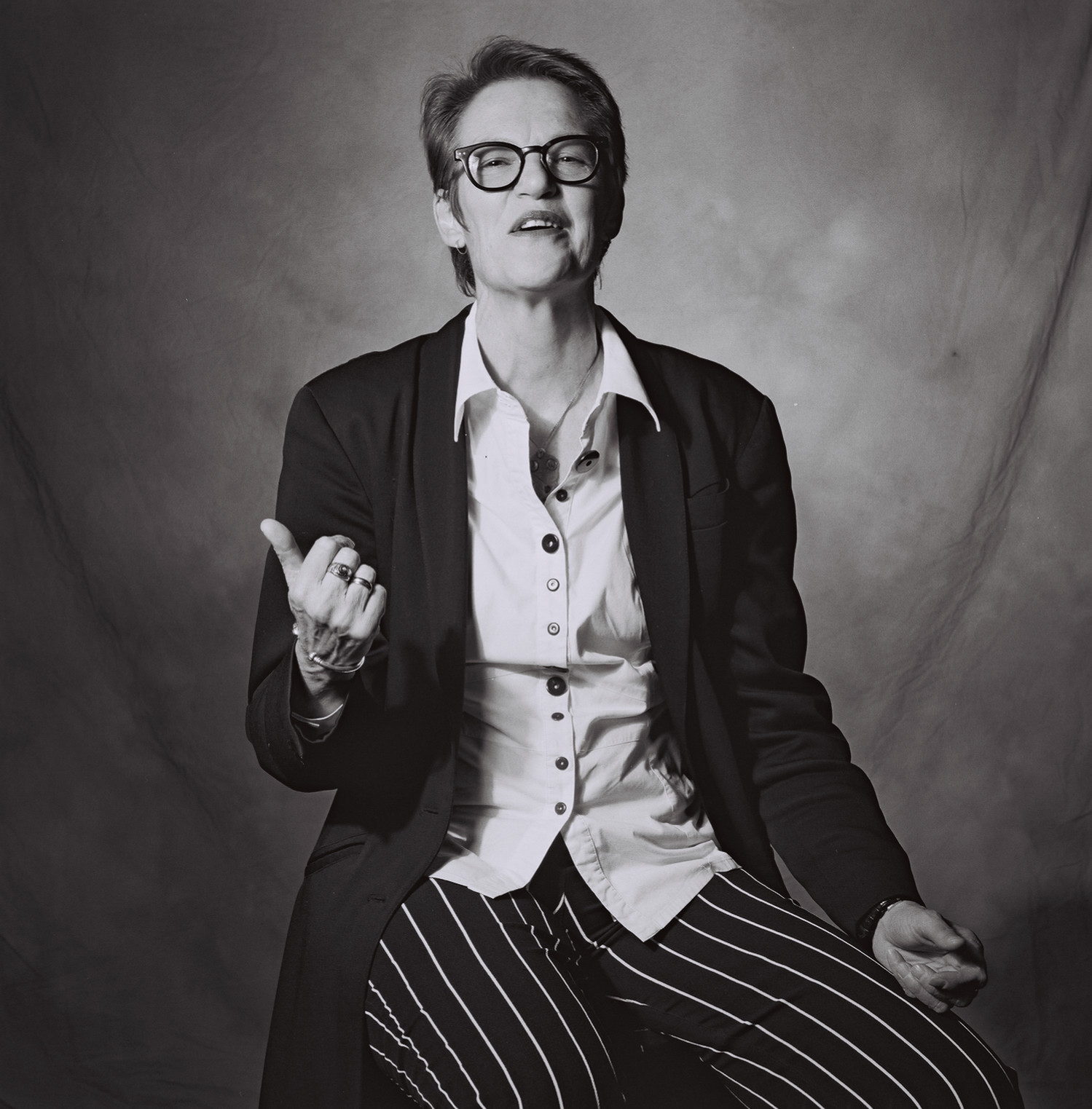
- Born: Balclutha, New Zealand
- Occupations: New Zealand art historian and biographer
- Website: www.joannedrayton.net

Joanne Drayton is a New Zealand art historian, biographer and nonfiction writer.

Drayton graduated from the University of Canterbury, Christchurch in 1998 with a PhD on "Edith Collier: Her life and work (1885–1964)". She adapted her thesis for publication by the Canterbury University Press the following year with the same title.

Drayton has tutored in art history at Whanganui Polytechnic and lectured at the Auckland University of Technology. In 2019 she was writer in residence at the University of Auckland.

The Search for Anne Perry was reviewed by Kirkus and summarised as: "Occasionally uneven but a pleasure for Perry’s loyal fans and a book that is likely to win her some new ones as well".

She won the 2019 General Non-Fiction Award at the Ockham New Zealand Book Awards for Hudson & Halls: The Food of Love.

== Selected works ==
- Drayton, Joanne; Collier, Edith; Sarjeant Gallery (1999), Edith Collier : her life and work 1885-1964, Canterbury University Press; Hadleigh : BRAD, ISBN 978-0-908812-91-2
- Drayton, Joanne; Haszard, Rhona, 1901-; UNITEC Institute of Technology (2002), Rhona Haszard : an experimental expatriate New Zealand artist, Canterbury University Press in association with UNITEC, ISBN 978-1-877257-18-6
- Drayton, Joanne; Hodgkins, Frances, 1869-1947 (2005), Frances Hodgkins : a private viewing, Godwit, ISBN 978-1-86962-117-9
- Drayton, Joanne (May 2010), Ngaio Marsh Her Life in Crime, HarperCollins Publishers (published 2010), ISBN 978-0-7304-4566-1
- Drayton, Joanne (2012), The search for Anne Perry, HarperCollinsPublishers, ISBN 978-1-86950-888-3
- Drayton, Joanne (2018), Hudson & Halls: the food of love, Otago University Press, ISBN 978-1-988531-26-7
